= Jayda Hylton-Pelaia =

Canadian-Jamaican footballer (born 1998)

Personal information
- Full name: Jayda Cheyni Hylton-Pelaia
- Date of birth: 30 May 1998 (age 28)
- Place of birth: Brampton, Ontario, Canada
- Height: 1.63 m (5 ft 4 in)
- Position: Full-back

Team information
- Current team: Woodbridge Strikers

Youth career
- 2006–2012: Brams United SC
- 2012–2015: Woodbridge Strikers

College career
Years	Team	Apps	(Gls)
2016–2019	East Carolina Pirates	56	(2)
2021	Arizona State Sun Devils	19	(1)

Senior career*
Years	Team	Apps	(Gls)
2015–2019	Woodbridge Strikers	31+	(2+)
2022–	Woodbridge Strikers	11	(0)

International career^{‡}
2018	Jamaica U20	2	(0)
2019–	Jamaica	6	(0)
Medal record
Representing Jamaica
CONCACAF W Championship
Third place	2022 Mexico
- * Club domestic league appearances and goals as of 19 July 2023 ‡ National team caps and goals as of 14 July 2022

Jayda Cheyni Hylton-Pelaia (born 30 May 1998) is a footballer who plays as a full-back for League1 Ontario club Woodbridge Strikers and the Jamaica women's national team. Born in Canada, she represents Jamaica at international level.

== Early life ==
Hylton-Pelaia was born in Brampton, Ontario, Canada. Her father, Gary Hylton, was born in Jamaica and lived there until he was a teenager and her mother, Tracy Pelaia, is of Italian descent. She began playing soccer at the age of eight with Brams United SC and joined the youth teams of Woodbridge Strikers while in high school. Hylton-Pelaia attended St. Augustine Catholic Secondary School in Brampton, where she was a team captain and two-time most valuable player during her four years with the Falcons.

== College ==
Hylton-Pelaia attended East Carolina University in Greenville, North Carolina, United States.

== International career ==
Although she was born in Canada, Hylton-Pelaia was also able to represent Jamaica, through her father, and Italy, through her mother. She was first called up by Jamaica at the under-20 level, named to the squad for the 2018 CONCACAF Women's U-20 Championship. Hylton-Pelaia made her debut in the lead-up to the tournament, starting a friendly against Costa Rica in January. At the championship, she started the Group B finale and played the entirety of a draw against Nicaragua.

=== Senior career, 2019–present ===
At the senior level, Hylton-Pelaia was called up for the first time at the 2019 Pan American Games. She earned her debut senior cap in the Group A opener against Mexico and went on to play in every minute of the tournament as Jamaica finished in seventh place. Following the end of the Games, head coach Hue Menzies said that Hylton-Pelaia "did well" and that she would be in consideration for future call-ups during the 2020 Summer Olympics qualifying process.

However, due to injury and the effects of the COVID-19 pandemic, Hylton-Pelaia did not appear for Jamaica for three years. Her next call was for the 2022 CONCACAF W Championship.

== Career statistics ==
=== Club ===
As of 19 July 2023

Appearances and goals by club, season and competition
Club	Season	League			Cup (Note: All appearances in the L1 Cup)		Other		Total	
Club	Season	Division	Apps	Goals	Apps	Goals	Apps	Goals	Apps	Goals
Woodbridge Strikers	2015	League1 Ontario					—			
Woodbridge Strikers	2016	League1 Ontario	11	1	3	0	—		14	1
Woodbridge Strikers	2017	League1 Ontario	6	0	1	0	—		7	0
Woodbridge Strikers	2018	League1 Ontario	6	0	3	1	0	0	9	1
Woodbridge Strikers	2019	League1 Ontario	8	1	—		0	0	8	1
Woodbridge Strikers	Total		31+	2+	7+	1+	0	0	38+	3+
Woodbridge Strikers	2022	League1 Ontario	3	0	—		0	0	3	0
Woodbridge Strikers	2023	League1 Ontario	8	0	—		0	0	8	0
Woodbridge Strikers	Total		11	0	0	0	0	0	11	0
Career total			42+	2+	7+	1+	0	0	49+	3+

=== International ===
As of 14 July 2022

Appearances and goals by national team and year
National team	Year	Apps	Goals
Jamaica	2019	4	0
Jamaica	2020	0	0
Jamaica	2021	0	0
Jamaica	2022	2	0
Total		6	0
