= Mahira Ali =

Egyptian footballer (born 1997)

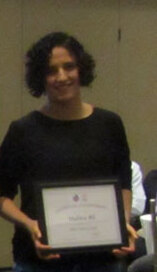
- Ali in 2018

Personal information
- Full name: Mahira Ali Mohmed Ali El Danbouki
- Date of birth: 1 November 1997 (age 29)
- Place of birth: Mansoura, Egypt
- Height: 1.63 m (5 ft 4 in)
- Position: Forward

Team information
- Current team: Beijing Jingtan
- Number: 28

Senior career*
Years	Team	Apps	(Gls)
2018–2019	Oakville Blue Devils	21	(34)
2019–2020	Aimz Academy Egypt		
2020–2022	El Gouna FC		
2022–2023	Wadi Degla SC		
2023	FC Kryvbas	9	(2)
2024–2026	Masar	81	(51)
2026–	Beijing Jingtan	7	(0)

International career^{‡}
2016–	Egypt	35	(2)
- * Club domestic league appearances and goals ‡ National team caps and goals as of 15 May 2026

Mahira Ali Mohmed Ali El Danbouki (born 1 November 1997) is an Egyptian footballer who plays for Beijing Jingtan in the Chinese Women's Super League and the Egypt women's national team.

== Club career ==
In 2018 she joined the Oakville Blue Devils in League1 Ontario. She scored her first goal in her debut on June 10, 2018, against West Ottawa SC. On July 21, she scored five goals in an 11–0 victory over Darby FC. On August 11, she scored four goals in a 6–1 victory over Aurora FC. In 2018, she won the award for Goal of the Year and was named a league First Team All-Star. She scored 16 goals in just 8 games during her first season with the Blue Devils. On May 31, 2019, she scored a hat trick against North Mississauga SC, and four goals on June 23 against DeRo United FC. She was again named a league First Team All-Star in 2019, after scoring 18 goals in 13 league games (adding 1 goal in five playoff matches). She won the league title with Oakville in 2019 becoming one of the first Egyptian women, along with teammate Rana Hamdy to win a domestic league title.

In 2019/20, she played with AIMZ Egypt, winning the Best Player in the Egyptian Women's Premier League award.

In 2021, she won the inaugural Egyptian Women's Cup with El Gouna.

In August 2022, she signed with Wadi Degla SC. She helped the side qualify for the 2022 CAF Women's Champions League, recording two assists (one in each match) in the qualifying tournament.

In March 2023, she joined Ukrainian Women's League club FC Kryvbas on an 18-month contract. She eventually was able to join the club in Ukraine in mid-May.

In 2024, she joined FC Masar in the Egyptian Women's Premier League. She won a bronze medal with the team at the 2024 CAF Women's Champions League, in the club's first ever appearance in the competition.

== International career ==
Ali has represented Egypt at the U16, U17, and U18 levels.

Ali represents the Egypt women's national team since 2016. She scored in March 2016 against Libya.

== International goals ==
No.	Date	Venue	Opponent	Score	Result	Competition
1.	6 October 2022	Police Academy Stadium, Cairo, Egypt	Jordan	1–0	1–0	Friendly
