= Jade Kovacevic =

Canadian soccer player (born 1994)

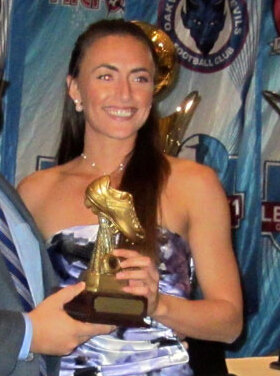
- Kovacevic receives L1O Golden Boot award in 2016

Personal information
- Date of birth: April 10, 1994 (age 32)
- Place of birth: Hamilton, Ontario, Canada
- Height: 1.67 m (5 ft 5 1/2 in)
- Position: Forward

Youth career
- Flamborough Flames SC
- Georgetown SC
- Oakville SC

College career
Years	Team	Apps	(Gls)
2012	LSU Tigers	17	(3)
2015–2016	Fanshawe Falcons	20	(49)
2018–2019	Fanshawe Falcons	19	(54)

Senior career*
Years	Team	Apps	(Gls)
2012–2014	Toronto Lady Lynx		
2016	FC London	16	(26)
2017	Győri ETO FC		
2017–2018	FC London	30	(58)
2019	Roma CF	11	(8)
2019–2021	FC London	22	(37)
2023	Vaughan Azzurri	1	(3)
2024	North Toronto Nitros	16	(16)
2025	AFC Toronto	15	(1)
Total		111+	(149+)

International career^{‡}
2010	Canada U17	6	(1)
2012	Canada U20	1	(0)
- * Club domestic league appearances and goals as of October 20, 2025 ‡ National team caps and goals as of August 20, 2012

Jade Kovacevic (born April 10, 1994) is a Canadian former soccer player. She is the all-time leading goal-scorer in both League1 Ontario and the Ontario Colleges Athletic Association. She was also the inaugural signing of the Northern Super League, Canada's first women's professional soccer league.

== Early life ==
Kovacevic was born in Hamilton, Ontario, and raised in Flamborough until she was 10, when her family moved to Acton, near Georgetown. She began playing soccer at age three following her older brother. She began playing youth soccer with the Flamborough Flames, later joining Georgetown SC and then Oakville SC. She also played at the district, regional, and Ontario provincial programs, from the age of 14.

== College career ==
=== Louisiana State ===
In February 2012, Kovacevic committed to attend Louisiana State University in the fall of 2012, where she played for the women's soccer team. Her debut was delayed, as she began the 2012 season with the Canada U20 team. She made her debut on September 2 against the Houston Cougars, also scoring her first goal in the match. In October, she was named the SEC Freshman of the Week. She was named to the All-SEC Second Team and the All-SEC Freshman Team, as well as the Louisiana All-State Second Team, and was named one of the Top 100 Freshmen by TopDrawerSoccer.com. After one semester, she decided to leave LSU.

=== Fanshawe College ===
She began attending Fanshawe College in London, Ontario, where she played for the women's soccer team in 2015 (after being a student the previous year). In her first season, she helped the team win the OCAA West title, in a season where she broke the Fanshawe and OCAA records for goals in a single season, and also tied the Fanshawe record for career goals for the school with 26 goals. She was named Fanshawe’s Female Athlete of the Year and was named the OCAA Women’s Soccer Player of the Year.

On September 14, 2016, she became Fanshawe's all-time scoring leader after scoring six goals in a 10-0 victory over the Redeemer Royals, which also set the record for most goals in a single game by a Fanshawe player (a record she would later break again). After leading the league in scoring for the second consecutive year, she was again named the OCAA Women's Soccer Player of the Year, as well as being named an OCAA All-Star and a CCAA All-Canadian.

She did not play in the 2017 season, returning to the team in 2018. In the first game of the season on September 8, 2018, she broke the single-game OCAA scoring record, scoring nine goals in a 16-0 victory over the Lambton Lions. For the 2018-19 season, in addition to being named Fanshawe's Athlete of the Year, she was named an OCAA All-Star, a CCAA All-Canadian for the third time, and the OCAA Women's Soccer Player of the Year, after finishing as the league scoring champion with 30 goals, breaking the OCAA single-season regular season goals record, as well as being named the CCAA Women’s Soccer Player of the Year. She was also named the OCAA Female Athlete of the Year, becoming the first Fanshawe woman to win the honour. With Fanshawe, she helped them win their first OCAA championship title in nine years, earning Tournament MVP honours, as well as helping them win bronze at the CCAA nationals.

She played her fourth and final season with Fanshawe in 2019. On September 21, she became the OCAA all-time leading scorer, after scoring her 84th in a 5-0 victory over the Mohawk Mountaineers, in which she scored four goals. On October 7, she became the first player to score 100 career OCAA goals. She led the team to their second consecutive OCAA title, once again earning Tournament MVP honours. She was named the OCAA player of the year for the fourth time in her four seasons (2015, 2016, 2018, and 2019), also being named the CCAA Player of the Year for the second consecutive season. She finished her OCAA career with 103 regular season goals (not including playoff championship matches).

== Club career ==
In 2012, she began playing with the Toronto Lady Lynx in the USL W-League as a defender. In June 2012, she was named to the W-League Team of the Week.

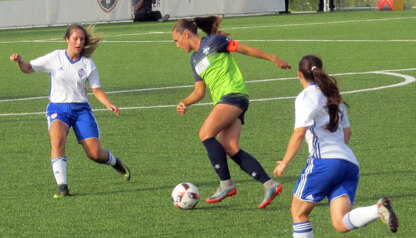
Kovacevic playing for FC London in 2017

In 2016, she began playing for FC London in FC London. In her first match on May 14, she scored both goals in a 2-1 victory over Vaughan Azzurri. She was named to the league mid-season all-star team to play against the all-stars from the PLSQ. On August 27, she scored five goals in a 6-0 victory over the Sanjaxx Lions. In her first season, she captained the team to the league championship won the Golden Boot with 26 goals, was named league MVP, and was named to the mid-season and year-end First Team All-Star.

In early 2017, she joined Hungarian club Győri ETO FC in the Női NB I.

Later in 2017, she returned to FC London, where she scored 40 goals in 20 league matches, as London won the league championship again, also winning the league cup title; while earning league MVP, First Team All-Star, and Golden Boot honours for the second consecutive season. In 2018, she scored 18 league goals in 10 league matches, leading the league in scoring again, despite missing a month-and-a-half due to injury. For the third consecutive year, she was named league MVP, a First Team All-Star, in addition to winning the Golden Boot.

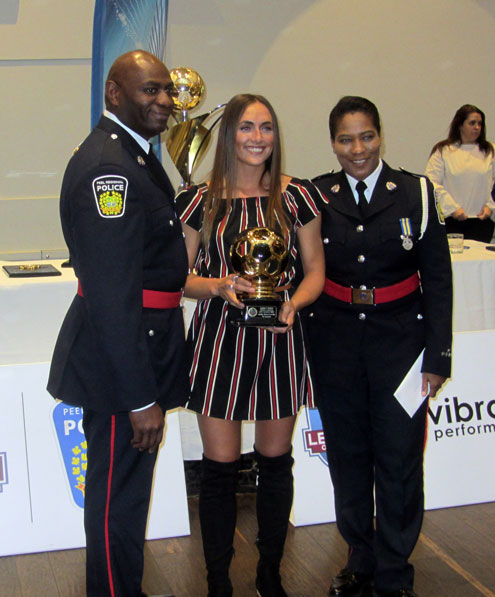
Kovacevic presented with 2017 L1O MVP award

In 2019, she signed with Italian club Roma CF, in the Serie B, an affiliate club of A.S. Roma. She scored eight goals in 11 matches.

After her stint in Italy, she returned to FC London. In 2019, she scored 21 goals in 12 league matches and scored another 8 in five playoff games. She scored the winning goal in the 2019 final to win the league championship in a 1-0 victory over Oakville Blue Devils FC. She was once again named league MVP, as well as winning the Golden Boot and being named a First Team All-Star. After the 2020 season was cancelled due to the COVID-19 pandemic, Kovacevic returned to the team in 2021, despite holding a full-time job in Toronto, two hours away. In September, she scored back-to-back hat tricks. In 2021, she scored 16 goals in 10 league matches, while also playing in one playoff match. She won her fifth consecutive Golden Boot and First Team All-Star selection. She departed the club after the 2021 season.

In 2023, she returned to League1 Ontario, joining Vaughan Azzurri. In her debut, on May 7, she scored a hat trick against Hamilton United. However, she suffered a ruptured Achilles in the match, ending her season.

In 2024, she began training with the North Toronto Nitros men's team during pre-season, before joining the women's team for the 2024 season. She scored 21 goals in 20 games for the club, across all competitions. At the end of the season, she was named a league First Team All-Star.

In October 2024, Kovacevic signed with AFC Toronto in the Northern Super League for the inaugural 2025 season, becoming the first official signing in club and league history. After missing the beginning of the season due to a fractured fibula injury, she made her NSL debut on June 7, 2025 against Ottawa Rapid FC. On September 13, 2025, she scored her first goal, in a 7-0 victory over Vancouver Rise FC. She won the league title with the club that season. In December 2025, she announced her retirement from the sport.

== International career ==
Born in Canada to a Serbian father and a Canadian mother, she applied for her Italian citizenship and passport in 2016.

She first joined the Canada program in 2010 at age 16, being invited to a Canada U17 camp. She played in three friendlies with the Canada U17 in June 2010, scoring against Japan on June 10. She also played three games at the 2010 FIFA U-17 Women's World Cup.

In July 2012, she was invited to a camp with the Canada U20 squad. The following month she was named to the squad for the 2012 FIFA U-20 Women’s World Cup.

In 2013, she was called to her first Canada senior team camp.

== Coaching career ==
In 2017, she served as an assistant coach with Fanshawe College, before returning to play for the team in 2018. While playing with FC London, she also was a coach with the side's U21 team, winning the provincial title in 2018. She also spent time coaching the club's U16 team in 2018 and with the London Mini-Stars house league program.

During the COVID-19 pandemic, Kovacevic started her own coaching company called J9 Training.

In October 2023, she joined the North Toronto Nitros, where she would serve as a coach with their women's League2 Ontario and Reserve programs.

== Career statistics ==
As of November 10, 2025

Club	Season	League			Playoffs		Domestic Cup		League Cup		Total	
Club	Season	Division	Apps	Goals	Apps	Goals	Apps	Goals	Apps	Goals	Apps	Goals
FC London	2016	League1 Ontario	16	26	—		—		2	3	18	29
FC London	2017	League1 Ontario	20	40	—		—		4	5	24	45
FC London	2018	League1 Ontario	10	18	1	1	—		1	0	12	19
FC London	Total		46	84	1	1	0	0	7	8	54	93
Roma CF	2018–19	Serie B	11	8	—		0	0	—		11	8
FC London	2019	League1 Ontario	12	21	5	8	—		—		17	29
FC London	2021	League1 Ontario	10	16	1	0	—		—		11	16
FC London	Total		22	37	6	8	0	0	0	0	28	45
Vaughan Azzurri	2023	League1 Ontario	1	3	0	0	—		—		1	3
North Toronto Nitros	2024	League1 Ontario	16	16	—		—		4	5	20	21
AFC Toronto	2025	Northern Super League	15	1	1	0	—		—		16	1
Career total			111	149	8	9	0	0	11	13	130	171

== Honours ==
=== Club ===
- FC London
  - League Champions: 2016, 2017, 2019
  - League Cup Champions: 2017
- AFC Toronto
  - Northern Super League: 2025

=== Individual ===
- L1O MVP: 2016, 2017, 2018, 2019,
- L1O Golden Boot: 2016, 2017, 2018, 2019, 2021
- L1O First Team All-Star: 2016, 2017, 2018, 2019, 2021, 2024
