= Nicole Kozlova =

Ukrainian footballer (born 2000)

Personal information
- Full name: Nicole Dmitrievna Kozlova
- Date of birth: 8 July 2000 (age 26)
- Place of birth: Toronto, Ontario, Canada
- Height: 1.65 m (5 ft 5 in)
- Position: Forward

Team information
- Current team: Glasgow City
- Number: 19

Youth career
- USC Academy
- Ontario REX
- 2015: Toronto Skillz FC
- 2015–2016: Scarborough GS United

College career
Years	Team	Apps	(Gls)
2018–2021	Virginia Tech Hokies	40	(14)

Senior career*
Years	Team	Apps	(Gls)
2016	Aurora United FC	1	(0)
2017	Woodbridge Strikers	11	(11)
2018–2019	DeRo United FC	8	(0)
2022–2023	HB Køge	18	(4)
2023–2024	FC Vorskla Poltava	16	(20)
2024–	Glasgow City	32	(21)

International career^{‡}
2016	Ukraine U17	3	(1)
2017	Ukraine U18	3	(4)
2017–2019	Ukraine U19	9	(5)
2019–	Ukraine	46	(7)
- * Club domestic league appearances and goals as of 18 May 2025 ‡ National team caps and goals as of 3 June 2025

Nicole Dmitrievna Kozlova (Ukrainian: Ніколь Дмитрівна Козлова; born 8 July 2000) is a professional footballer who plays as a forward for Scottish Women's Premier League club Glasgow City. Born in Canada, she plays for the Ukraine national team.

== Early life ==
Kozlova was born in Toronto, Ontario, to Ukrainian parents. She began playing soccer at age five with USC Academy.

In 2014 and 2015, she was part of the Ontario REX program, and also played with Toronto Skillz FC in 2015. In 2015 and 2016, she won back-to-back Ontario Cups with Scarborough GS United, also earning back-to-back bronze medals at the national championships. She represented Team Ontario at the 2017 Canada Games.

== College career ==
In 2018, she began attending Virginia Tech, where she played for the women's soccer team. She redshirted her first year, after tearing her ACL, forcing her to miss the entire season. In September 2019, she earned Atlantic Coast Conference (ACC) Offensive Player of the Week honours, after scoring back-to-back game winning goals. In 2021, she earned All-ACC Academic Team honours.

== Club career ==
In 2016, she appeared in one match for Aurora United FC in League1 Ontario. In 2017, Kozlova played for the Woodbridge Strikers in that league where she scored 11 goals and was named a league First-Team All Star. In 2018 and 2019, she played for DeRo United FC in the same league.

In 2022, she joined HB Køge in Denmark.

In July 2023, Kozlova signed a one-year contract with Ukrainian Women's League club FC Vorskla Poltava. She won the league and cup double, scoring 16 goals in 20 league matches.

In July 2024, she signed with Scottish Women's Premier League club Glasgow City. She made her debut on 11 August, scoring two goals in a 7-0 victory over Montrose.

== International career ==
In 2016, she made her debut with the Ukraine U17.

In March 2017, she attended a camp with the Canada U20 team.

In May 2017, she scored four goals and added five assists in three matches with Ukraine at the UEFA U18 Development Tournament.

In June 2019, she earned her first callup to the Ukraine national team. She made her debut on 5 October 2019 against Germany. In 2022, they won the 2022 Turkish Women's Cup. She scored her first senior goal on 7 March 2020 at the 2020 Pinatar Cup against Northern Ireland.

== Career statistics ==
=== Club ===
As of 25 April 2024

Club	Season	League			Domestic Cup		League Cup		Continental		Total	
Club	Season	Division	Apps	Goals	Apps	Goals	Apps	Goals	Apps	Goals	Apps	Goals
Aurora United FC	2016	League1 Ontario	1	0	—		?	?	—		1	0
Woodbridge Strikers	2017	League1 Ontario	11	11	—		3	1	—		14	12
DeRo United FC	2018	League1 Ontario	6	0	—		?	?	—		6	0
DeRo United FC	2019	League1 Ontario	2	0	—		—		—		2	0
DeRo United FC	Total		8	0	0	0	0	0	0	0	8	0
HB Køge	2021–22	Danish Women's League	9	3	?	?	—		—		9	3
HB Køge	2022–23	Danish Women's League	9	1	?	?	—		1	0	10	1
HB Køge	Total		18	4	0	0	0	0	1	0	19	4
FC Vorskla Poltava	2023–24	Ukrainian Women's League	20	16	4	7	—		4	3	28	26
Career total			48	31	4	7	3	1	5	3	70	42

=== International goals ===
No.	Date	Venue	Opponent	Score	Result	Competition
1.	7 March 2020	Pinatar Arena, San Pedro del Pinatar, Spain	Northern Ireland	1–0	4–0	2020 Pinatar Cup
2.	22 September 2020	Obolon Arena, Kyiv, Ukraine	Greece	1–0	4–0	UEFA Women's Euro 2022 qualifying
3.	22 September 2020	Obolon Arena, Kyiv, Ukraine	Greece	2–0	4–0	UEFA Women's Euro 2022 qualifying
4.	23 February 2021	Gold City Sports Complex, Kargıcak, Turkey	India	1–2	3–2	2021 Turkish Women's Cup
5.	21 October 2021	Kolos Stadium, Kovalivka, Ukraine	Faroe Islands	1–0	4–0	2023 FIFA Women's World Cup qualification
6.	4 June 2024	Dyskobolia Grodzisk Wielkopolski Stadium, Grodzisk Wielkopolski, Poland	Wales	2–2	2–2	UEFA Women's Euro 2025 qualifying
7.	21 February 2025	Niko Dovana Stadium, Durrës, Albania	Albania	2–0	2–1	2025 UEFA Women's Nations League
