= Diamond Simpson =

Canadian soccer player (born 1993)

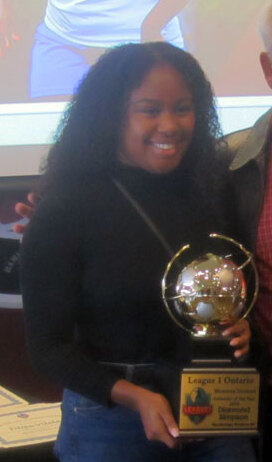
- Simpson receives L1O Defender of the Year award in 2019

Personal information
- Date of birth: April 28, 1993 (age 33)
- Place of birth: Scarborough, Ontario, Canada
- Height: 1.62 m (5 ft 4 in)
- Position: Defender

Youth career
- North Mississauga SC
- Dixie SC

College career
Years	Team	Apps	(Gls)
2012–2015	Memphis Tigers	77	(6)

Senior career*
Years	Team	Apps	(Gls)
2010–2013	K–W United FC		
2015–2016	Woodbridge Strikers	12+	(0+)
2017	Toronto Azzurri Blizzard	14	(2)
2018–2019	Woodbridge Strikers	25	(8)
2023	Woodbridge Strikers	4	(2)

International career^{‡}
2008–2010	Canada U-17	13	(1)
2012	Canada U-20	1	(0)
2010–2011	Canada	4	(0)
- * Club domestic league appearances and goals as of May 10, 2023 ‡ National team caps and goals as of April 24, 2022

Diamond Simpson (born April 28, 1993) is a Canadian soccer player who plays as a defender. She made four appearances for the Canada national team in 2010 and 2011.

== Early life ==
She began playing youth soccer at age 8 with North Mississauga SC, later playing with Dixie SC.

== College career ==
From 2012 to 2015, she played college soccer for the Memphis Tigers of the University of Memphis. She scored her first goal on September 6, 2012, scoring the overtime winner against the Vanderbilt Commodores, earning her Conference USA Offensive Player of the Week honours. In 2012, she was named to the NSCAA All-Central Region second team, All-Conference USA second team, and C-USA All-Freshman Team. In her sophomore season, she was named to the American Athletic Conference second team and the NSCAA All-Northeast Third Team. In 2014, she was named to the All-American Athletic Conference First Team and NSCAA All-Region Second Team.

== Club career ==
In 2010, she began playing with Hamilton FC Rage (later became K-W United) in the USL W-League.

In 2015 and 2016, she played with Woodbridge Strikers in League1 Ontario. In 2016, she was named a league First-Team All Star.

In 2017, she played with Toronto Azzurri Blizzard. She was named the league's Defender of the Year as well as a First Team All Star.

In 2018 and 2019, she played for Woodbridge Strikers once again. On July 14, 2018, she scored two goals in two minutes to lead Woodbridge to a 3–1 victory over Durham United FA. In 2018 and 2019, she was once again named against named Defender of the Year, for the second and third times, as well as First Team All Star Selections for the third and fourth consecutive times. In 2020, she was named to the League1 Ontario Women's All-Time Best XI. In 2023, she returned to the team.

== International career ==
Simpson won a bronze medal with the Canada U17 at the 2008 CONCACAF Women's U-17 Championship and also reached the quarter-finals with Canada at the 2008 FIFA U-17 Women's World Cup. She won a gold medal at the 2010 CONCACAF Women's U-17 Championship, where she scored her first goal on March 13, 2010, in a 2–1 victory over Panama U17. She won a silver medal with Canada at the 2012 CONCACAF Women's U-20 Championship.

She made her debut for the Canada senior team on December 9, 2010, against the Netherlands. She won a gold medal with Canada at the 2011 Pan American Games.

In 2010, she was named the Canadian Women's U-17 Player of the Year.

== Honours ==
Club

- League1 Ontario League Cup: 2018

International

- CONCACAF Women's U-17 Championship
  - Gold: 2010
  - Silver: 2008
- CONCACAF Women's U-20 Championship
  - Silver: 2012
- Pan American Games
  - Gold: 2011

Individual

- League1 Ontario Defender of the Year: 2017, 2018, 2019
- League1 Ontario First Team All-Star: 2016, 2017, 2018, 2019
- USL W-League All Central Conference Team: 2013
