= 2017 League1 Ontario season (women) =

League1 Ontario Women's Division
- Season: 2017
- Champions: FC London
- Cup champions: FC London
- Matches: 110
- Goals: 440 (4 per match)
- Top goalscorer: Jade Kovacevic (40 goals)
- Best goalkeeper: Emily Gillet (0.62 GAA)
- Biggest home win: 12 goals: London 12–0 Durham (14 September)
- Biggest away win: 7 goals: Woodbridge 0–7 Durham (23 July); Woodbridge 0–7 Aurora (13 August)
- Highest scoring: 13 goals: North Miss 12–1 Darby (22 July)

The 2017 League1 Ontario season was the third season of play for the Women's Division of League1 Ontario, a Division 3 semi-professional soccer league in the Canadian soccer pyramid and the highest level of soccer based in the Canadian province of Ontario.

For the first time, the league expanded to include teams in the nation's capital, Ottawa, allowing it to span from the western to eastern borders of southern Ontario.

== Changes from 2016 ==
The women's division grew from nine to eleven teams, with the addition of Toronto Azzurri Blizzard, Unionville Milliken SC, and West Ottawa SC, while the Kingston Clippers women's side did not return for play.

== Teams ==
Team	City	Principal Stadium	Founded	First Season	Head Coach (Note: Unless otherwise noted, this information was obtained from team directories on the league website)
Aurora FC	Aurora	St. Maximillion Kolbe	2015	2016	Gianni Cimini
Darby FC	Whitby	South Courtice Turf & Whitby Soccer Centre	2015	2016	Mirco Schroff
Durham United FA	Pickering	Kinsmen Park		2015	Chris Eveleigh
FC London	London	German Canadian FC Stadium	2015	2016	Mike Marcoccia
North Mississauga SC	Mississauga	Hershey Centre		2015	Jhon Ardila
Sanjaxx Lions	Toronto	Monarch Park Stadium		2015	Ramon McIntosh
Toronto Azzurri Blizzard	Toronto (North York)	Azzurri Village	2017	2017	Cesare Tripodo
Unionville Milliken SC	Unionville (Markham)	Bill Crothers Park	2017	2017	Paul Omoghan
Vaughan Azzurri	Vaughan	McNaughton Park		2015	Carmine Isacco
West Ottawa SC	Beckwith	Beckwith Park	2017	2017	Kristina Kiss
Woodbridge Strikers	Vaughan (Woodbridge)	Vaughan Grove		2015	David Porco

Location of Women's Division teams for the 2017 League1 Ontario season.
Current team
See Toronto inset
Location of teams in or near Toronto for the 2017 League1 Ontario season.
Current team

== Standings ==
Each team plays 20 matches as part of the season; two games split home and away against every other team in the division. There are no playoffs; the first-place team is crowned as league champion at the end of the season.

Pos	Team	Pld	W	D	L	GF	GA	GD	Pts
1	FC London (C, X)	20	15	3	2	78	13	+65	48
2	Vaughan Azzurri	20	12	3	5	51	26	+25	39
3	North Mississauga SC	20	11	6	3	54	18	+36	39
4	Unionville Milliken SC	20	10	3	7	40	41	−1	33
5	Durham United FA	20	9	4	7	48	42	+6	31
6	Aurora FC	20	9	2	9	25	37	−12	29 (Note: Aurora FC beat Woodbridge Strikers on head-to-head points (6–0).)
7	Woodbridge Strikers	20	9	2	9	49	55	−6	29
8	West Ottawa SC	20	9	1	10	39	34	+5	28
9	Toronto Azzurri Blizzard	20	6	4	10	21	32	−11	22
10	Sanjaxx Lions	20	2	2	16	11	61	−50	8 (Note: Sanjaxx Lions and Darby FC tied on head-to-head points (3–3) and head-to-head goal differential (3–3).)
11	Darby FC	20	2	2	16	24	81	−57	8

Source: http://www.league1ontario.com/page/show/2309115-standings
Rules for classification: 1) points; 2) total wins; 3) head-to-head points; 4) head-to-head goal differential; 5) playoff match
(C) Champions; (X) L1 Cup winner

== Cup ==
The cup tournament is a separate contest from the rest of the season, in which all eleven teams from the women's division take part. It is not a form of playoffs at the end of the season (as is typically seen in North American sports), but is more like the Canadian Championship or the FA Cup, albeit only for League1 Ontario teams. All matches are separate from the regular season and are not reflected in the season standings.

The cup tournament for the women's division is a single-match knockout tournament with four total rounds culminating in a final match in the start of August, with initial matchups determined by random draw. Each match in the tournament must return a result; any match drawn after 90 minutes will advance directly to kicks from the penalty mark instead of extra time.

First Round
North Mississauga SC	4
Toronto Azzurri Blizzard	0
FC London	4
Aurora FC	1
Darby FC	1
Vaughan Azzurri	4

Quarterfinals
West Ottawa SC	9
North Mississauga SC	2
Unionville Milliken SC	2
Woodbridge Strikers	3
Durham United FA	0
FC London	2
Vaughan Azzurri	5
Sanjaxx Lions	0

Semifinals
West Ottawa SC	2
Woodbridge Strikers	3
FC London	4
Vaughan Azzurri	0

Final
Woodbridge Strikers	1
FC London	6

=== First Round ===
May 24, 2017	North Mississauga SC	4–0	Toronto Azzurri Blizzard	Mississauga, Ontario
7:30 pm	Lawes 6'; Kyeame 32'; Brunet 37'; Twidle 51'	Report		Stadium: Hershey Centre

May 31, 2017	FC London	4–1	Aurora FC	London, Ontario
6:30 pm	Benati 9'; Larose 44', 78'; Kovacevic 90'	Report	Stratigakis 88'	Stadium: German-Canadian Club of London Field

May 24, 2017	Darby FC	1–4	Vaughan Azzurri	Whitby, Ontario
9:00 pm	Boujos 54'	Report	Lyon 18', 48'; Lukasewich 43'; Nater 47'	Stadium: Whitby Soccer Centre

=== Quarterfinals ===
June 27, 2017	West Ottawa SC	9–2	North Mississauga SC	Ottawa, Ontario
7:00 pm	de Jesus-Shaw 16', 86'; Kabangu 24', 59'; Harrison 28'; Gilles 34'; Macmillan 45'; Baynes 74'; Mcpherson 83'	Report	Trayor 13', 68'	Stadium: Oz Optics Stadium

June 13, 2017	Unionville Milliken SC	2–3	Woodbridge Strikers	Unionville, Ontario
8:00 pm	Chang 16'; Nashmi 21'	Report	Kozlova 39'; Tyrell 55', 63'	Stadium: Bill Crothers Turf Centre

June 20, 2017	Durham United FA	0–2	FC London	Pickering, Ontario
7:30 pm		Report	Campbell 24'; Kovacevic 68'	Stadium: Pickering Soccer Complex

June 14, 2017	Vaughan Azzurri	5–0	Sanjaxx Lions	Vaughan, Ontario
8:00 pm	Lyon 8', 36', 44', 79'; Lukasewich 56'	Report		Stadium: McNaughton Turf

=== Semifinals ===
July 11, 2017	Woodbridge Strikers	3–2	West Ottawa SC	Vaughan, Ontario
7:00 pm	Mottershead 9'; Tolnai 88'; Lofranco 90+3'	Report	Harrison 48'; Royer 69'	Stadium: Vaughan Grove Park

July 11, 2017	Vaughan Azzurri	0–4	FC London	Vaughan, Ontario
7:00 pm		Report	Kovacevic 53', 86'; Campbell 76', 90'	Stadium: McNaughton Park

=== Final ===
August 6, 2017	Woodbridge Strikers	1–6	FC London	Vaughan, Ontario
5:30 pm	Appleton 83'	Report	Campbell 14', 46'; Kovacevic 19'; Oliveira 73', 89'; Novak 78'	Stadium: Ontario Soccer Centre

== Statistics ==
=== Top Goalscorers ===
Rank	Player	Club	Goals
1	(Canada) Jade Kovacevic	FC London	40
2	(Canada) Cassandra Briscoe	North Mississauga SC	13
2	(Canada) Laura Twidle	North Mississauga SC	13
4	(Canada) Laura Gosse	Durham United	12
5	(Ukraine) Nicole Kozlova	Woodbridge Strikers	11
6	(Canada) Ashley Campbell	FC London	8
6	(Canada) Arielle Kabangu	West Ottawa SC	8
8	(Nine players tied)		7

Updated to matches played on October 8, 2017. Source:

=== Top Goalkeepers ===
Rank	Player	Club	Minutes	GAA
1	(Canada) Emily Gillet	FC London	1440	0.62
2	(Canada) Vanessa Fiore	North Mississauga SC	1530	0.88
3	(Canada) Marissa Zucchetto	Unionville Milliken SC	720	1.12
4	(Sweden) Mollie Eriksson	West Ottawa SC	1207	1.34
5	(Canada) Jahnaia Amyotte	Toronto Azzurri Blizzard	681	1.45
6	(Canada) Patricia Koutoulas	Aurora FC	727	1.61
7	(Canada) Sarah Petrucci	Durham United	831	1.62
8	(Canada) Taylor Grant	Vaughan Azzurri	810	1.78
9	(Canada) Hannah Zakinthinos	Sanjaxx Lions	1025	2.28
10	(Canada) Findley Dunn	Sanjaxx Lions	653	3.17

Updated to matches played on October 8, 2017. Minimum 540 minutes played. Source:

== Awards ==
The following players received honours in the 2017 season:

Award	Player (Club)
Most Valuable Player	Jade Kovacevic (FC London)
Golden Boot	Jade Kovacevic (FC London)
Coach of the Year	Jhon Ardila (North Mississauga)
Young Player of the Year	Samantha Chang (Unionville Milliken)
Defender of the Year	Diamond Simpson (Toronto Azzurri Blizzard)
Goalkeeper of the Year	Emily Gillet (FC London)
Fair Play Award	Cat Rogers (North Mississauga)
Goal of the Year	Alessia Mattucci (Vaughan Azzurri)

First Team All-Stars

Goalkeeper	Defenders	Midfielders	Forwards
Emily Gillet (FC London)	Olivia Lukasewich (Vaughan Azzurri); Diamond Simpson (Toronto Azzurri Blizzard); Kira Bertrand (North Mississauga)	Laura Twidle (North Mississauga); Samantha Chang (Unionville Milliken); Sara Wong (Vaughan Azzurri); Alyscha Mottershead (Woodbridge Strikers)	Ashley Campbell (FC London); Jade Kovacevic (FC London); Nicole Kozlova (Woodbridge Strikers)

Second Team All-Stars

Goalkeeper	Defenders	Midfielders	Forwards
Vanessa Fiore (North Mississauga)	Tamara Brown (Durham United); Briana DeSouza (Durham United); Melissa Corso (Unionville Milliken); Malikae Dayes (Toronto Azzurri Blizzard)	Cat Rogers (North Mississauga); Taylor Potts (Durham United); Claudia Piazza (Vaughan Azzurri); Victoria Pickett (Aurora FC)	Natasha Klassios (Unionville Milliken); Colleen Beesley (Vaughan Azzurri)

Third Team All-Stars

Goalkeeper	Defenders	Midfielders	Forwards
Marissa Zucchetto (Unionville Milliken)	Patricia Koutoulas (Aurora FC); Christina White (North Mississauga); Jenna Hong (FC London); Sara Reynolds (Aurora FC); Vanessa Gilles (West Ottawa SC)	Julia Benati (FC London); Josie De Jesus-Shaw (West Ottawa SC); Sona Makulova (Sanjaxx Lions)	Lauryn Arruda (Darby FC); Shana Flynn (Unionville Milliken); Cassandra Briscoe (North Mississauga); Laura Gosse (Durham United)

== All-Star Game ==
On June 28, the league announced that this year's all-star game would take place against the Ontario team competing in the 2017 Canada Summer Games. The rosters for this game will be selected by team & league officials, and was announced on July 25.

July 25, 2017	L1O All-Stars	1–1 (5–6 p)	Ontario (Canada Games)	Vaughan, Ontario
7:30 pm	Kovacevic 79'		Kozlova 22'	Stadium: Ontario Soccer Centre

League1 Ontario All-Stars
Pos.	Name	Team
GK	Taylor Grant	Vaughan Azzurri
GK	Patricia Koutoulas	Aurora FC
D	Kira Bertrand	North Mississauga SC
D	Tamara Brown	Durham United FA
D	Vanessa Gilles	West Ottawa SC
D	Diamond Simpson	Toronto Azzurri Blizzard
D	Chrissie White	North Mississauga SC
D	Maddie Iozzi	Durham United FA
M	Sarah Stratigakis	Aurora FC
M	Sarah Wong	Vaughan Azzurri
M	Claudia Piazza	Vaughan Azzurri
M	Julia Wong	Sanjaxx Lions
M	Victoria Pickett	Aurora FC
M	Taylor Potts	Durham United FA
F	Jade Kovacevic	FC London
F	Arielle Kabangu	West Ottawa SC
F	Lauryn Arruda	Darby FC
F	Ashley Campbell	FC London

Ontario (Canada Games)
Pos.	Name	Team
GK	Mollie Eriksson	West Ottawa SC
GK	Kayza Massey	
	Maya Antoine	
	Ariel Young	
	Maliah De Rosario	
	Emily Amano	
	Olivia Cooke	West Ottawa SC
	Sarah Owusu	Toronto Azzurri Blizzard
	Anna Kowalczyk	Vaughan Azzurri
	Nicole Kozlova	Woodbridge Strikers
	Melanie Forbes	
	Malikae Dayes	Toronto Azzurri Blizzard
	Adriane Devlin	Aurora FC
	Kalalin Tolnai	Woodbridge Strikers
	Brigitta Pulins	Woodbridge Strikers
	Emma Davies	
