= Oakville Blue Devils =

Oakville Blue Devils may refer to:

- Brampton United, known as Oakville Blue Devils from 2005 to 2006, Canadian soccer club that played in the Canadian Soccer League
- Blue Devils FC, known as Oakville Blue Devils FC from 2015 to 2020, Canadian soccer club that plays in League1 Ontario since 2015
