= 2018 League1 Ontario season (women) =

League1 Ontario Women's Division
- Season: 2018
- Champions: Durham United
- L1 Cup champions: Woodbridge Strikers
- Matches: 78
- Goals: 269 (3.45 per match)
- Top goalscorer: Jade Kovacevic (19 goals)
- Best goalkeeper: Marissa Zucchetto; Alana Rossi (0.50 GAA)
- Highest scoring: Oakville 11–0 Darby (July 21)
- All statistics correct as of September 1, 2018.

The 2018 League1 Ontario season was the fourth season of play for the Women's Division of League1 Ontario, a Division 3 semi-professional soccer league in the Canadian soccer pyramid and the highest level of soccer based in the Canadian province of Ontario. Durham United FA won the league championship after beating the previously undefeated FC London and Woodbridge Strikers in the playoffs.

== Changes from 2017 ==
The women's division grew from 11 to 13 teams, with the addition of women's side from the Oakville Blue Devils, as well as Hamilton United (representing the league's first entry from that city) and DeRo United FC (an academy run by former national team player Dwayne De Rosario). Sanjaxx Lions did not field a team in the women's division for this season.

== Teams ==
Team	City	Principal Stadium	Founded	First season	Head coach (Note: Unless otherwise noted, this information was obtained from team directories on the league website)
Aurora FC	Aurora	Stewart Burnett Park	2015	2016	Gianni Cimini
Darby FC	Whitby	Whitby Soccer Centre & Darlington Field	2015	2016	Mirco Schroff
DeRo United FC	Toronto (Scarborough)	L'Amoreaux Park	2018	2018	
Durham United FA	Pickering	Kinsmen Park		2015	Ramin Muhammadi
Hamilton United	Hamilton	Ron Joyce Stadium	2018	2018	
FC London	London	German Canadian FC Stadium	2015	2016	Mike Marcoccia
North Mississauga SC	Mississauga	Hershey Centre		2015	Jhon Ardila
Oakville Blue Devils	Oakville	Sheridan Trafalgar Stadium	2018	2018	
Toronto Azzurri Blizzard	Toronto (North York)	Azzurri Village	2017	2017	Cesare Tripodo
Unionville Milliken SC	Unionville (Markham)	Bill Crothers Park	2017	2017	Paul Omoghan
Vaughan Azzurri	Vaughan	McNaughton Park		2015	Carmine Isacco
West Ottawa SC	Ottawa	Wesley Clover Park	2017	2017	Kristina Kiss
Woodbridge Strikers	Woodbridge (Vaughan)	Vaughan Grove		2015	David Porco

Location of Women's Division teams for the 2018 League1 Ontario season.
Current team
See Toronto inset
Location of teams in or near Toronto for the 2018 League1 Ontario season.
Current team

== Regular season ==
Each team plays 12 matches as part of the season; one match against all other teams. The top four teams advance to the playoffs to determine the league champion.

Pos	Team	Pld	W	D	L	GF	GA	GD	Pts	Qualification
1	FC London	12	11	1	0	31	9	+22	34	League Playoffs
2	Woodbridge Strikers	12	9	3	0	32	9	+23	30	League Playoffs
3	Vaughan Azzurri	12	8	0	4	31	16	+15	24	League Playoffs
4	Durham United FA (C)	12	7	2	3	25	9	+16	23	League Playoffs
5	Oakville Blue Devils	12	7	1	4	40	18	+22	22	
6	DeRo United FC	12	6	3	3	20	12	+8	21	
7	Hamilton United	12	5	3	4	22	14	+8	18	
8	Unionville Milliken SC	12	5	3	4	17	12	+5	18	
9	North Mississauga SC	12	4	0	8	13	39	−26	12	
10	West Ottawa SC	12	3	1	8	15	28	−13	10	
11	Aurora FC	12	2	2	8	10	21	−11	8	
12	Darby FC	12	1	1	10	9	38	−29	4	
13	Toronto Azzurri Blizzard	12	0	0	12	4	44	−40	0	

Updated to match(es) played on August 21, 2018. Source: http://www.league1ontario.com/page/show/2309115-standings
Rules for classification: 1) points; 2) total wins; 3) head-to-head points; 4) head-to-head goal differential; 5) playoff match
(C) Champions

== Playoffs ==
The top four teams from the regular season earn entry into the playoffs, which consists of a single knockout phase containing two semifinals and a final.

Semifinals
1	FC London	1
4	Durham United	2
2	Woodbridge Strikers	1
3	Vaughan Azzurri	0

Finals
4	Durham United	1
2	Woodbridge Strikers	0

=== Semifinals ===
August 22, 2018	Woodbridge Strikers	1–0	Vaughan Azzurri	Vaughan, Ontario
9:00 pm				Stadium: Vaughan Grove Park

August 25, 2018	FC London	1–2	Durham United	London, Ontario
6:30 pm				Stadium: German Canadian Club

=== Final ===
September 1, 2018	Woodbridge Strikers	0–1	Durham United	Vaughan, Ontario
3:00 pm				Stadium: Ontario Soccer Centre

== Cup ==
The cup tournament is a separate contest from the rest of the season, in which all thirteen teams from the women's division take part. It is not a form of playoffs at the end of the season (as is typically seen in North American sports), but is more like the Canadian Championship or the FA Cup, albeit only for League1 Ontario teams. All matches are separate from the regular season and are not reflected in the season standings.

The cup tournament is a single-match knockout tournament with four total rounds culminating in a final match in the start of August, with initial matchups determined by random draw. Each match in the tournament must return a result; any match drawn after 90 minutes will advance directly to kicks from the penalty mark instead of extra time.

First round
May 26 Wesley Clover Turf
West Ottawa SC	1
DeRo United FC	3
May 27 Stewart Burnett Park
Oakville Blue Devils	1
Aurora FC	2
May 27 Vaughan Grove
Durham United FA	0
Woodbridge Strikers	4
May 25 Clarington Field
Darby FC	1
Toronto Azzurri Blizzard	3
May 26 McNaughton Park
Vaughan Azzurri	2
Hamilton United	0

Quarterfinals
June 24 Hershey Centre
North Mississauga SC	2
DeRo United FC	3
June 24 Vaughan Grove
Aurora FC	1
Woodbridge Strikers	3
June 24 Ontario Soccer Centre
Unionville Milliken SC	2
Toronto Azzurri Blizzard	0
June 23 Marconi Club
Vaughan Azzurri	1
FC London	0

Semifinals
July 22 Vaughan Grove
DeRo United FC	0
Woodbridge Strikers	1
July 21 McNaughton Park
Unionville Milliken SC	0 (4)
Vaughan Azzurri	0 (3)

Final
August 4 Ontario Soccer Centre
Woodbridge Strikers	1
Unionville Milliken SC	0

== Statistics ==
=== Top goalscorers ===
Rank	Player	Club	Goals
1	Jade Kovacevic	FC London	19
2	Mahira Ali	Oakville Blue Devils	16
3	Nour Ghoneim	Vaughan Azzurri	12
4	Angela Cutaia	Hamilton United	11
5	Laura Gosse	Durham United FA	8

Updated to matches played on August 21, 2018. Source:

=== Top goalkeepers ===
Rank	Player	Club	Minutes	GAA
1	Alana Rossi	Hamilton United	360	0.50
1	Marissa Zucchetto	Unionville Milliken SC	360	0.50
3	Patricia Koutoulas	Oakville Blue Devils	450	0.60
4	Emily Gillet	FC London	900	0.70
5	Olivia Tierney	DeRo United FC	388	0.93

Updated to matches played on August 21, 2018. Minimum 360 minutes played. Source:

== Awards ==
The following players received honours in the 2018 season:

Award	Player (Club)
Most Valuable Player	Jade Kovacevic (FC London)
Golden Boot	Jade Kovacevic (FC London)
Coach of the Year	Mike Marcoccia (FC London); Ramin Mohammadi (Durham United)
Young Player of the Year	Markela Bejleri (Aurora FC)
Defender of the Year	Diamond Simpson (Woodbridge Strikers)
Goalkeeper of the Year	Sara Petrucci (Durham United)
Fair Play Award	Sara Wong (Vaughan Azzurri)
Goal of the Year	Mahira Ali (Oakville Blue Devils)

First Team All-Stars

Goalkeeper	Defenders	Midfielders	Forwards
Sara Petrucci (Durham United)	Rachel Melhado (Vaughan Azzurri); Diamond Simpson (Woodbridge Strikers); Tamara Brown (Durham United)	Katherine Koehler-Grassau (DeRo United); Julia Benati (FC London); Sara Wong (Vaughan Azzurri); April Syme (Woodbridge Strikers)	Mahira Ali (Oakville Blue Devils); Jade Kovacevic (FC London); Nour Ghoneim (Vaughan Azzurri)

Second Team All-Stars

Goalkeeper	Defenders	Midfielders	Forwards
Vanessa Fiore (North Mississauga)	Christina White (Woodbridge Strikers); Mikaela Tierney (DeRo United); Jenna Hong (FC London)	Alyscha Mottershead (Woodbridge Strikers); Carla Portillo (North Mississauga); Ashley Campbell (FC London); Alicia Tamburro (Durham United)	Angela Cutaia (Hamilton United); Laura Gosse (Durham United); Nathasha Klassios (Unionville Milliken)

Third Team All-Stars

Goalkeeper	Defenders	Midfielders	Forwards
Marilena Spagnolo (Hamilton United)	Abigail Hubble (Darby FC); Kayla Goncalves (Unionville Milliken); Kira Bertrand (Woodbridge Strikers)	Markela Bejleri (Aurora FC); Laura Twidle (Oakville Blue Devils); Rebecca Bartosh (Toronto Azzurri Blizzard); Jessie Faber (Vaughan Azzurri)	Cassandre Van Bakel (Vaughan Azzurri); Crystal Schuder (West Ottawa SC); Alexis Kirton (DeRo United)
