= Mikayla Dayes =

Canadian-Jamaican footballer (born 1999)

Personal information
- Full name: Mikayla Sandra Dayes
- Date of birth: 29 September 1999 (age 27)
- Place of birth: Toronto, Ontario, Canada
- Position: Forward

Team information
- Current team: Rodez
- Number: 28

College career
| Years | Team | Apps | (Gls) |
| 2017–2022 | Maryland Terrapins | 84 | (14) |

Senior career*
| Years | Team | Apps | (Gls) |
| 2016 | Woodbridge Strikers | 4 | (2) |
| 2017 | Toronto Azzurri Blizzard | 6 | (0) |
| 2023 | Saint-Étienne | 2 | (1) |
| 2023– | Rodez | 27 | (5) |

International career^{‡}
| 2016 | Canada U17 | 2 | (0) |
| 2021– | Jamaica | 9 | (1) |
- * Club domestic league appearances and goals as of 20 October 2024 ‡ National team caps and goals as of 25 October 2024

Mikayla Sandra Dayes (born 29 September 1999) is a professional footballer who plays as a forward for Seconde Ligue club Rodez. Born in Canada, she represents Jamaica at international level. She previously played for her country of birth women's national under-17 team.

== College career ==
After playing at Saint Thomas Aquinas Secondary School and for the Toronto Blizzard, Dayes chose University of Maryland for her collegiate career. Her freshman year, she earned Big Ten Freshman of the Week Honors. She played in every game the rest of her college career. Dayes helped Maryland reach the Big Ten Tournament, the first time Maryland had ever reached it in women's soccer. Dayes made the Big Ten All Tournament Team and had a three game-winning goals, a team high.

She studied biological sciences and public health science.

== Club career ==
In 2016, Dayes played with the Woodbridge Strikers in League1 Ontario. In 2017, she played with the Toronto Azzurri Blizzard.

Dayes played for AS Saint-Étienne in the French Division 2 Féminine.

== International career ==
Dayes was a former Canada youth international and played at the 2016 FIFA U-17 Women's World Cup and the 2018 CONCACAF Women's U-20 Championship.

Dayes made her senior international debut for Jamaica on 13 June 2021, coming in as a substitute against the United States. She featured in for Jamaica's 2022 CONCACAF Women's World Cup qualifiers and played in the women's football tournament at the 2023 CAC Games where she scored her first international goal in a 3–7 loss to Mexico.

After 22 of the 23 senior Jamaica players who featured at the 2023 Women's World Cup opted out of Jamaica's CONCACAF W Gold Cup qualifiers due to financial disputes with the Jamaica Football Federation, Dayes was called up. She played in Gold Cup qualifiers against Panama and Guatemala.

== Personal life ==
Dayes' twin sister Malikae Dayes also played for the University of Maryland and has been called up for Jamaica. Both of their parents, Georgette and Humphrey, are from Jamaica.
