= 2021 League1 Ontario season (women) =

League1 Ontario Women's Division
- Season: 2021
- Dates: July 2, 2021 - November 7, 2021
- Champions: Woodbridge Strikers
- Regular Season Champions: FC London
- Matches: 42
- Goals: 180 (4.29 per match)
- Top goalscorer: Jade Kovacevic (16)

The 2021 League1 Ontario season was the sixth season of play (the 2020 season was cancelled due to the COVID-19 pandemic) for the Women's Division of League1 Ontario, a Division 3 women's soccer league in the Canadian soccer pyramid and the highest level of soccer based in the Canadian province of Ontario.

The league announced a projected start date of July 2, 2021, also announcing a 'drop-dead date' of June 7, 2021 that will confirm the start of the season on that date depending on restrictions in the province, otherwise the season would be cancelled.

== Format ==
The league will be played in a single table of 7 teams, playing a total of 12 matches, with the top four clubs advancing to the playoffs.

Because the season began three months later than normal and with very short notice, some clubs have opted to delay their return to Premier Division competition until the 2022 season. As a large portion of the L1O player pool consisted of university and college student athletes, some sides would have limited squads after Labour Day. To combat these challenges, the league created a short-season ‘Summer Championship Series’ for 2021, which will conclude by Labour Day.

In addition, the Reserve Division will begin for the first time (after the inaugural women's reserve division was cancelled along with the rest of the league in 2020, following a similar format to the Premier Division, featuring 10 teams playing 12 matches, with the top teams advancing to the playoffs and featuring Championship Finals weekend on November 6-7.

== Clubs ==
The women's division consists of 15 teams, an increase from 13 teams in 2020. Guelph Union, Tecumseh SC, and Waterloo United are new addition, while Aurora FC did not return. North Toronto Nitros will also be making their official debut, after their inaugural season was cancelled due to the pandemic.

The following clubs are set to participate in the league:

Team	City	Principal stadium	Main Division	Summer Championship Division	Reserve Division
Alliance United FC	Markham	Mount Joy & Centennial College	Withdrew	Did not enter	Participating
Blue Devils FC	Oakville	Sheridan Trafalgar Stadium	Participating	Participating (Two teams)	Withdrew
Darby FC	Whitby	Whitby Soccer Centre & Darlington Field	Withdrew	Participating	Withdrew
Hamilton United	Hamilton	Ron Joyce Stadium & Tim Hortons Field	Participating	Did not enter	Withdrew
FC London	London	German Canadian Club	Participating	Did not enter	Participating
FC Oshawa	Oshawa	Civic Stadium	Withdrew	Did not enter	Withdrew
Guelph Union	Guelph	Alumni Stadium	Withdrew	Participating	Withdrew
North Mississauga SC	Mississauga	Paramount Fine Foods Centre	Withdrew	Did not enter	Participating
North Toronto Nitros	Toronto	Downsview Turf	Participating	Did not enter	Withdrew
Pickering FC	Pickering	Kinsmen Park	Withdrew	Did not enter	Participating
Tecumseh SC	Tecumseh	University of Windsor Stadium	Participating	Did not enter	Participating
Unionville Milliken SC	Markham	Azzurri Village & Mount Joy	Withdrew	Participating	Participating
Vaughan Azzurri	Vaughan	North Maple Regional Park	Participating	Participating	Participating
Waterloo United	Waterloo	Warrior Field, University of Waterloo	Withdrew	Participating	Withdrew
Woodbridge Strikers	Vaughan	Vaughan Grove	Participating	Did not enter	Participating

The following clubs, while not formally part of the League1 Ontario women's division are operating teams in the Reserve Division (both clubs operate teams in the men's division):

Team	City	Principal stadium	Main Division	Summer Championship Division	Reserve Division
Master's Futbol	Toronto	L'Amoreaux Park	N/A	N/A	Participating
ProStars FC	Brampton	Victoria Park Stadium	N/A	N/A	Participating

== Main Division ==
Pos	Team	Pld	W	D	L	GF	GA	GD	Pts	
1	FC London	12	9	2	1	26	8	+18	29	Advance to playoffs
2	Woodbridge Strikers (O)	12	6	3	3	28	11	+17	21	Advance to playoffs
3	Vaughan Azzurri	12	6	2	4	19	16	+3	20	Advance to playoffs
4	Blue Devils FC	12	6	1	5	16	18	−2	19	Advance to playoffs
5	Hamilton United	12	4	1	7	21	27	−6	13	
6	North Toronto Nitros	12	4	0	8	12	24	−12	12	
7	Tecumseh SC	12	2	1	9	8	26	−18	7	

Source: Standings
(O) Play-off winners

=== Playoffs ===
Semifinals
1	FC London	1
4	Blue Devils FC	2
2	Woodbridge Strikers	1(4)
3	Vaughan Azzurri	1(3)

Championship Game
4	Blue Devils FC	0
2	Woodbridge Strikers	1

Semi-finals

October 31, 2021	FC London	1–2	Blue Devils FC	London, Ontario
2:00 PM	Lewis 27'	Report	Kozak 39'; Twidle 71'	Stadium: Tricar Field

October 31, 2021	Woodbridge Strikers	1–1 (4–3 p)	Vaughan Azzurri	Vaughan, Ontario
2:00 PM	Oduro 88'	Report	Desa 37'	Stadium: Vaughan Grove Park

Final

November 7, 2021	Woodbridge Strikers	1–0	Blue Devils FC	Vaughan, Ontario
7:00 PM	Dolan 7'	Report		Stadium: Ontario Soccer Centre; Referee: Amanda Kwan

=== Statistics ===
==== Top goalscorers ====
Rank	Player	Club	Goals
1	Jade Kovacevic	FC London	16
2	Miranda Badovinac	Hamilton United	9
3	Kennedi Herrmann	Woodbridge Strikers	7
4	Laura Twidle	Blue Devils FC	6
4	Jenny Wolever	Hamilton United	5
4	Nia Fleming-Thompson	Vaughan Azzurri	5

==== Top goalkeepers ====
Rank	Player	Club	Minutes	GAA
1	Marilena Spagnolo	Hamilton United	270	0.67
1	Patricia Koutoulas	North Toronto Nitros	270	0.67
3	Breanne Carreiro	FC London	341	0.79
4	Vanessa Fiore	Darby FC	856	0.84
5	Emily Gillet	Woodbridge Strikers	739	0.85

Minimum 270 minutes played. Source:

=== Honours ===
The following awards and nominations were awarded for the 2021 season.

==== Awards ====
Award	Player	Team
Most Valuable Player	(Canada) Laura Twidle	Blue Devils FC
Golden Boot	(Canada) Jade Kovacevic	FC London
Coach of the Year	(Canada) Dave Porco	Woodbridge Strikers
Top Goalkeeper	(Canada) Vanessa Fiore	Woodbridge Strikers
Top Defender	(Canada) Meghan Scott	FC London
Top Midfielder	(Canada) Julia Benati	FC London

==== League All-Stars ====
First Team

Player	Position
(Canada) Vanessa Fiore (Woodbridge Strikers)	Goalkeeper
(Canada) Meghan Scott (FC London)	Defender
(Canada) Christina White (Woodbridge Strikers)	Defender
(Canada) Teniola Odetoyinho (Vaughan Azzurri)	Defender
(Canada) Talia Merino-Sierra (Blue Devils FC)	Defender
(Canada) Julia Benati (FC London)	Midfielder
(Canada) April Syme (Woodbridge Strikers)	Midfielder
(Canada) Lidia Bradau (Blue Devils FC)	Midfielder
(Canada) Jade Kovacevic (FC London)	Forward
(Canada) Laura Twidle (Blue Devils FC)	Forward
(Canada) Jenny Wolever (Hamilton United)	Forward

Second Team

Player	Position
(Canada) Emily Gillet (FC London)	Goalkeeper
(Canada) Olivia Mancini (North Toronto Nitros)	Defender
(Canada) Ariana Mouratidis (Woodbridge Strikers)	Defender
(Canada) Lorena Marcone (Hamilton United)	Defender
(Canada) Brooke MacLeod (Tecumseh SC)	Defender
(Canada) Hannah Anderson (Hamilton United)	Midfielder
(Guyana) Brianne Desa (Vaughan Azzurri)	Midfielder
(Canada) Angelika Mihalopoulos (FC London)	Midfielder
(Canada) Jessie De Boer (North Toronto Nitros)	Midfielder
(Canada) Miranda Badovinac (Hamilton United)	Forward
(Canada) Kennedi Herrmann (Woodbridge Strikers)	Forward

== Summer Championship Division ==
The league is operating a short-season division called the Summer Championship in 2021.

Pos	Team	Pld	W	D	L	GF	GA	GD	Pts
1	Guelph Union	6	6	0	0	17	1	+16	18
2	Vaughan Azzurri B	6	3	1	2	10	9	+1	10
3	Blue Devils FC B	6	3	0	3	13	11	+2	9
4	Waterloo United	6	2	1	3	10	9	+1	7
5	Unionville Milliken SC	6	2	1	3	13	13	0	7
6	Blue Devils FC C	6	1	2	3	10	23	−13	5
7	Darby FC	6	1	1	4	7	14	−7	4

Source: Standings

== Reserve Division ==
The league is set to operate a Reserve division this season as well.

Pos	Team	Pld	W	D	L	GF	GA	GD	Pts	Qualification
1	Woodbridge Strikers B	12	10	1	1	60	7	+53	31	Advance to playoffs
2	Unionville Milliken SC B	12	9	0	3	30	15	+15	27	Advance to playoffs
3	Alliance United FC	12	8	3	1	29	14	+15	27	Advance to playoffs
4	Vaughan Azzurri C (O)	12	7	3	2	29	14	+15	24	Advance to playoffs
5	Tecumseh SC B	12	7	2	3	36	32	+4	23	
6	ProStars FC	12	4	1	7	16	22	−6	13	
7	FC London B	12	4	1	7	14	22	−8	13	
8	Pickering FC	12	3	1	8	15	36	−21	10	
9	Master's Futbol	12	1	1	10	9	45	−36	4	
10	North Mississauga SC	12	0	1	11	10	41	−31	1	

Source: Standings
(O) Play-off winners

=== Playoffs ===
Semifinals
1	Woodbridge Strikers B	0
4	Vaughan Azzurri C	2
2	Unionville Milliken SC B	1
3	Alliance United	0

Championship Game
4	Vaughan Azzurri C	1(6)
2	Unionville Milliken SC B	1(5)

Semi-finals

November 5, 2021	Woodbridge Strikers B	0–2	Vaughan Azzurri C	Vaughan, Ontario
9:00 PM		Report	Fleming-Thompson 7'; Paraskevopoulos 44'	Stadium: Vaughan Grove Sports Park

November 5, 2021	Unionville Milliken B	1–0	Alliance United	Unionville, Ontario
9:00 PM	Sinda 26'	Report		Stadium: Bill Crothers Secondary School

Final

November 14, 2021	Unionville Milliken B	1–1 (5–6 p)	Vaughan Azzurri C	Vaughan, Ontario
1:00 PM	Allen 11'	Report	Famele 30'	Stadium: Ontario Soccer Centre; Referee: Vasyl Dzikh
	Penalties
	Penalty scored Penalty missed		Penalty scored
