= Whitby FC =

Canadian soccer team

- Full name: Whitby Football Club
- Founded: 2015; 11 years ago
- Stadium: Whitby Soccer Centre
- Head Coach: Ramin Mohammadi (men); Rich Hirst (women)
- League: League1 Ontario
- 2025: L1O-C, 4th (men); L1O-C, 5th (women)
- Website: https://www.whitbysoccer.com/page/show/2812831-league-1-darby-fc

Whitby Football Club is a Canadian semi-professional soccer club based in Whitby, Ontario that plays in the League1 Ontario men's and women's divisions. The club was founded in 2015 as Darby FC as a partnership between Whitby FC and Darlington SC.

== Founders ==
The club was founded in 2015 as a joint partnership between Durham Region clubs Darlington Soccer Club and Whitby Soccer Club with the name Darby coming from name blending the two names.

=== Darlington SC ===
Founding clubs of Darby FC

Darlington Soccer Club is a youth soccer club from the municipality of Clarington. Its roots date back to the foundation of the Darlington Soccer League founded in 1880; which is argued to be the oldest in Canada.

=== Whitby FC ===
Whitby FC is a youth soccer club in Whitby, Ontario. It was founded in 1966 as the Whitby Iroquois SC. In 2016, the club rebranded as Whitby FC with a new logo.

== History ==
Darby FC logo

The club's first team entered the women's division of League1 Ontario in 2016. Their inaugural game resulted in a 1–1 draw with North Mississauga SC. They finished their debut season in eighth place, out of nine clubs.

In 2018, Darby added their men's team to the men's league, which is one division below the top-tier Canadian Premier League. Many of the players on their inaugural roster came from the prior year's Durham United FA roster, as Durham did not enter a team for the 2018 season. Their debut match on April 28, 2018 was against the Woodbridge Strikers and resulted in a 1–1 draw.

In December 2024, the club announced the re-branding of their League1 Ontario team to Whitby FC for the 2025 season.

== Seasons ==
=== Men ===
Season	League	Teams	Record	Rank	Playoffs	League Cup	Ref
2018	League1 Ontario	17	6–3–7	9th	Group stage	Round of 16	
2019	League1 Ontario	16	7–2–6	9th	Did not qualify	–	
2020	League1 Ontario	Season cancelled due to COVID-19 pandemic					
2021	League1 Ontario	15	3–3–6	6th, East (12th overall)	Did not qualify	–	
2022	League1 Ontario	22	7–4–10	13th	Did not qualify	–	
2023	League1 Ontario	21	6–5–9	14th	Did not qualify	–	
2024	League1 Ontario Championship	10	5–2–11	8th	–	Round of 16	
2025	League1 Ontario Championship	12	10–6–6	4th	–	Round of 16	

=== Women ===
Season	League	Teams	Record	Rank	Playoffs	League Cup	Ref
2016	League1 Ontario	9	2–3–11	8th	–	Preliminary Round	
2017	League1 Ontario	11	2–2–16	11th	–	Round of 16	
2018	League1 Ontario	13	1–1–10	12th	Did not qualify	Round of 16	
2019	League1 Ontario	14	6–1–6	8th	Quarter-finals	–	
2020	Season cancelled due to COVID-19 pandemic						
2021	League1 Ontario Summer Championship	7	1–1–4	7th	–	–	
2022	League1 Ontario	20	9–0–9	10th	Did not qualify	–	
2023	League1 Ontario	19	4–4–10	16th	Did not qualify	–	
2024	League1 Ontario Championship	10	4–4–10	9th	–	Semi-finals	
2025	League1 Ontario Championship	9	6–7–3	5th	–	Quarter-finals	

== Notable former players ==
The following players have either played at the professional or international level, either before or after playing for the League1 Ontario team:

=== Men ===
- (Guyana) Kashiff de Jonge
- (Canada) Trivine Esprit
- (Canada) Steven Furlano
- (Canada) Stefan Lamanna
- (Jamaica) Shawn-Claud Lawson
- (Canada) Taylor Lord
- (Canada) Cale Loughrey
- (Cameroon) Frantz Pangop
- (Canada) Joe Zupo

=== Women ===
- (Sweden) (Canada) Mollie Eriksson
- (Jamaica) Christine Exeter
- (Guyana) (Canada) Alicia Zaban
