= Tarik Robertson =

Canadian soccer player

Personal information
- Position: Defender

Youth career
- Dixie SC

College career
Years	Team	Apps	(Gls)
- Sheridan Bruins

Senior career*
Years	Team	Apps	(Gls)
2011–2013	Brampton City United FC		
2014–2015	Toronto FC III		
2015	Toronto FC II	2	(0)
2016	Oakville Blue Devils FC	15	(1)
2018	Woodbridge Strikers	15	(1)
- * Club domestic league appearances and goals as of December 15, 2019

Tarik Robertson is a Canadian former soccer player who played as a defender.

== Career ==
=== College ===
He played college soccer with the Sheridan Bruins. In 2014, after converting the winning penalty kick in the shootout in the semi-finals, helping the Bruins advance to the finals, they won the CCAA National Championship.

=== Club ===
From 2011 to 2013, he was playing with Brampton City United FC in the Canadian Soccer League.

While with Toronto FC Academy, he played with Toronto FC III in League1 Ontario in 2014 and 2015. In 2014, he won the League1 Ontario title and the Inter-Provincial Cup with TFCIII.

On April 15, 2015, he signed an Amateur Player Agreement with Toronto FC II of the USL. He made his debut that same day against the Pittsburgh Riverhounds, being sent off in the match after receiving a red card.

In 2016, he joined Oakville Blue Devils FC in League1 Ontario. He made 15 appearances that season, scoring one goal on August 23 against his former team, Toronto FC III.

In 2018, he played with the Woodbridge Strikers, appearing in 15 league matches and 2 playoff matches.
