= Markela Bejleri =

Albanian footballer (born 2001)

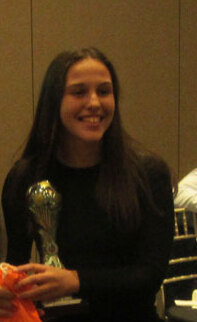
- Bejleri receives L1O Young Player of the Year award in 2018

Personal information
- Date of birth: 28 May 2001 (age 25)
- Place of birth: Toronto, Ontario, Canada
- Height: 1.60 m (5 ft 3 in)
- Position: Midfielder

Team information
- Current team: Länk Vilaverdense

Youth career
- Richmond Hill SC
- Aurora Youth SC

College career
Years	Team	Apps	(Gls)
2019–2023	Quinnipiac Bobcats	76	(12)

Senior career*
Years	Team	Apps	(Gls)
2018–2019	Aurora FC	17	(5)
2022–2023	North Mississauga SC	15	(2)
2024	Länk Vilaverdense	7	(0)

International career^{‡}
2017–2018	Albania U19	6	(0)
2020–	Albania	5	(0)
- * Club domestic league appearances and goals as of 9 July 2024 ‡ National team caps and goals as of 4 December 2022

Markela Bejleri (born 28 May 2001) is a former footballer who played as a midfielder. Born in Canada, she represented the Albania women's national team.

== College career ==
In 2019, she began playing for the Quinnipiac Bobcats. She scored her first goal on 1 September 2019, against the Loyola Greyhounds. She was an MAAC All-Academic Team in 2020 and 2021, a 2021 All-MAAC Second Team, and a 2021 NEWISA All-New England Third Team. In 2022, she was named to the MAAC All-Preseason team, and then after the season to the MAAC All-Championship Team, the All-MAAC First Team, and the MAAC All-Academic Team. Ahead of the 2023 season, she was named to the MAAC All-Preseason team and at the end of the season was named to the All-MAAC First Team.

== Club career ==
In 2018 and 2019, she played for Aurora FC in League1 Ontario. She scored a brace, including her first goal in League1 Ontario, on 12 May 2018, in a 3–0 victory over Toronto Azzurri Blizzard. In 2018, she led the team in scoring and was named the League1 Ontario Young Player of the Year, as well as a League Third-Team All-Star.

In 2022, she played for North Mississauga SC in League1 Ontario. She made a single appearance in 2023.

== International career ==
In 2017, she was attended a camp with the Canada U17 team.

Later in 2017, she played with the Albania U19. In 2018, she earned her first callup to the Albania senior team for World Cup qualification. She made her senior debut on 11 March 2020, in a World Cup qualifier against Cyprus.

== See also ==
- List of Albania women's international footballers
