= 2019 League1 Ontario season (women) =

League1 Ontario Women's Division
- Season: 2019
- Champions: FC London
- Regular season champions: Oakville Blue Devils
- Matches: 91
- Goals: 381 (4.19 per match)
- Top goalscorer: Jade Kovacevic (21 goals)
- Highest scoring: OSU Force 13–0 North Mississauga (May 11)
- All statistics correct as of August 31, 2019.

The 2019 League1 Ontario season was the fifth season of play for the Women's Division of League1 Ontario, a Division 3 semi-professional soccer league in the Canadian soccer pyramid and the highest level of soccer based in the Canadian province of Ontario. FC London won the league championship after beating the Oakville Blue Devils in the finals.

== Changes from 2018 ==
The women's division grew from 13 to 14 teams, with the addition of three new women's sides from FC Oshawa, Alliance United FC, and Ottawa South United, while West Ottawa SC and Toronto Azzurri Blizzard departed the league.

For the first time ever, the L1O season did not include a cup competition which had previously been played alongside the regular season. Additionally, the group stage playoff format was changed to a more traditional knockout bracket with two-leg matchups in the quarter-finals and semi-finals.

== Regular season ==
Each team plays 13 matches as part of the season; one match against all other teams. The top eight teams advance to the playoffs to determine the league champion.

Pos	Team	Pld	W	D	L	GF	GA	GD	Pts	Qualification
1	Oakville Blue Devils	13	11	0	2	47	11	+36	33	League Playoffs
2	Vaughan Azzurri	13	10	1	2	45	10	+35	31	League Playoffs
3	FC London (C)	13	7	3	3	39	18	+21	24	League Playoffs
4	Woodbridge Strikers	13	7	1	5	28	11	+17	22	League Playoffs
5	Ottawa South United Force	13	6	2	5	30	25	+5	20 (Note: Ottawa South United beat FC Oshawa and Alliance United on head-to-head points (6–1–1).)	League Playoffs
6	FC Oshawa	13	6	2	5	27	16	+11	20 (Note: FC Oshawa had a better goal differential than Alliance United.)	League Playoffs
7	Alliance United FC	13	6	2	5	19	30	−11	20	League Playoffs
8	Darby FC	13	6	1	6	22	24	−2	19	League Playoffs
9	DeRo United	13	5	3	5	17	22	−5	18	
10	Durham United FA	13	4	5	4	26	21	+5	17 (Note: Durham United had a better goal differential than Unionville Milliken.)	
11	Unionville Milliken SC	13	4	5	4	25	22	+3	17	
12	Hamilton United	13	4	1	8	30	32	−2	13	
13	Aurora FC	13	1	2	10	21	27	−6	5	
14	North Mississauga SC	13	0	0	13	5	112	−107	0	

Updated to match(es) played on August 31, 2019. Source: https://www.league1ontario.com/standings/show/4851061?subseason=593813
Rules for classification: 1) points; 2) total wins; 3) head-to-head points; 4) goal differential; 5) most goals
(C) Champions

== Playoffs ==
The top eight teams from the regular season qualified for the playoffs. New in 2019, the quarter-finals and semi-finals feature a two-leg format.

=== Bracket ===
Quarter-finals
#1 Oakville Blue Devils	2	6	8
#8 Darby FC	0	0	0
#4 Woodbridge Strikers	3	1	4
#5 Ottawa South United	0	0	0
#3 FC London	4	3	7
#6 FC Oshawa	1	0	1
#2 Vaughan Azzurri	6	2	8
#7 Alliance United FC	0	0	0

Semi-finals
#1 Oakville Blue Devils (pk)	0	1	1
#4 Woodbridge Strikers	1	0	1
#3 FC London	4	1	5
#2 Vaughan Azzurri	3	0	3

Final
#1 Oakville Blue Devils	0
#3 FC London	1

== Statistics ==
=== Top goalscorers ===
Rank	Player	Club	Goals
1	Jade Kovacevic	FC London	21
2	Mahira Ali	Oakville Blue Devils	18
3	Jesse Faber	Vaughan Azzurri	15
4	Courtney Chochol	Aurora FC	9
4	Leah Pais	Vaughan Azzurri	9
4	Clarissa Larisey	Ottawa South United	9

=== Top goalkeepers ===
Rank	Player	Club	Minutes	GAA
1	Elisa Lapadula	Oakville Blue Devils	544	0.66
2	Zeeyana Jivraj	Woodbridge Strikers	630	0.71
3	Katrina Haarmann	Vaughan Azzurri	1170	0.77
4	Mollie Eriksson	Darby FC	630	1.00
4	Vanessa Fiore	Woodbridge Strikers	540	1.00

Minimum 360 minutes played. Source:

== Honours ==
The following awards and nominations were awarded for the 2019 season.

=== Awards ===
Award	Player	Team	Ref
Most Valuable Player	(Canada) Jade Kovacevic	FC London	
Golden Boot	(Canada) Jade Kovacevic	FC London	
Coach of the Year	(Canada) John Yacou	Oakville Blue Devils FC	
Young Player of the Year	(Canada) Leah Pais	Vaughan Azzurri	
Top Goalkeeper	(Canada) Sarah Forde	FC Oshawa	
Top Defender	(Canada) Diamond Simpson	Woodbridge Strikers	
Top Midfielder	(Canada) Julia Benati	FC London	

=== League All-Stars ===
The following players were named League1 Ontario All-Stars for the 2019 season:

First Team All-Star

Player	Position
(Canada) Sarah Forde (FC Oshawa)	Goalkeeper
(Canada) Teni Odetoyinbo (Vaughan Azzurri)	Defender
(Canada) Diamond Simpson (Woodbridge)	Defender
(Canada) Rachel Melhado (Oakville)	Defender
(Canada) Julia Benati (FC London)	Midfielder
(Canada) April Syme (Woodbridge Strikers)	Midfielder
(Canada) Jessie Faber (Vaughan Azzurri)	Midfielder
(Canada) Mahira Ali (Oakville Blue Devils)	Midfielder
(Canada) Laura Twidle (Oakville Blue Devils)	Midfielder
(Canada) Leah Pais (Vaughan Azzurri)	Forward
(Canada) Jade Kovacevic (FC London)	Forward

Second Team All-Star

Player	Position
(Canada) Elisa Lapadula (Oakville Blue Devils)	Goalkeeper
(Guyana) Briana DeSouza (Durham United)	Defender
(Canada) Christina White (Woodbridge Strikers)	Defender
(Canada) Daniela Strano (FC London)	Defender
(Canada) Sona Makulova (FC Oshawa)	Midfielder
(Canada) Claudia Piazza (Vaughan Azzurri)	Midfielder
(Canada) Marisa Oliveira (FC London)	Midfielder
(Canada) Hollie Babut (Durham United)	Midfielder
(Canada) Jasmine Vilgrain (DeRo United)	Midfielder
(Canada) Angela Cutaia (Hamilton United)	Forward
(Canada) Lauren Hart (Woodbridge Strikers)	Forward

Third Team All-Star

Player	Position
(Canada) Meghan Phillips (Aurora FC)	Goalkeeper
(Canada) Olivia Cooke (Darby FC)	Defender
(Canada) Jasmine Burke (DeRo United)	Defender
(Canada) Erin Cliffe (Oakville Blue Devils)	Defender
(Canada) Kayla Goncalves (Unionville Milliken)	Defender
(Canada) Alycha Blair (Woodbridge Strikers)	Midfielder
(Canada) Clarisse Ramirez (Ottawa South Utd)	Midfielder
(Canada) Tori Chia (Darby FC)	Midfielder
(Canada) Jessica Friend (Alliance United)	Midfielder
(Canada) Laura Gosse (Alliance United)	Forward
(Canada) Magan Arsenault (Alliance United)	Forward
