= Malikae Dayes =

Canadian-Jamaican footballer (born 1999)

Personal information
- Full name: Malikae Allison Dayes
- Date of birth: 29 September 1999 (age 27)
- Place of birth: Brampton, Canada
- Height: 1.68 m (5 ft 6 in)
- Position: Defender

Team information
- Current team: AaB Fodbold

Senior career*
Years	Team	Apps	(Gls)
2016	Woodbridge Strikers	8	(2)
2017	Toronto Azzurri Blizzard	9	(0)
2023	AS Saint-Étienne	11	
2023–	AaB Fodbold		

International career
2022–	Jamaica	7	(0)
- * Club domestic league appearances and goals

Malikae Dayes (born 29 September 1999) is a professional footballer who plays for AaB Fodbold as a defender. Born in Canada, she represents Jamaica internationally.

== College career ==
After playing at Saint Thomas Aquinas Secondary School and for the Toronto Blizzard, Dayes chose University of Maryland for her collegiate career. After several appearances throughout her freshman season (2017), she became a starter in defense, starting in every game in 2018 and 2019. Dayes was named the Big Ten Defensive Player of the Week in September 2019. She helped Maryland reach the Big Ten Tournament, the first time Maryland had ever reached it in women soccer. Dayes made the Big Ten All Tournament Team.

Dayes continued playing for two years as a graduate student at Maryland, remaining a defensive stalwart for the team. She studied for a graduate degree in business and management.

== Club career ==
In 2016, Dayes played with the Woodbridge Strikers in League1 Ontario. In 2017, she played with the Toronto Azzurri Blizzard.

Dayes briefly signed for AS Saint-Étienne, joining in the winter of 2023. In the summer, she signed for AaB Fodbold in Denmark's Elitedivisionen.

== International career ==
Dayes played Canada at a youth level.

Dayes was first called up to the senior Jamaica women's national team in 2022. She was also selected for the Jamaica squad by Lorne Donaldson for two international friendlies against Paraguay in 2022. She appeared as a substitute in one CONCACAF Women's World Cup qualifier and played in the women's football tournament at the 2023 CAC Games.

After 22 of the 23 senior Jamaica players who featured at the 2023 Women's World Cup opted out of Jamaica's CONCACAF W Gold Cup qualifiers due to financial disputes with the Jamaica Football Federation, Dayes was called up. She played in Gold Cup qualifiers against Panama and Guatemala.

== Personal life ==
Dayes' twin sister Mikayla Dayes also played for the University of Maryland and has been called up for Jamaica. Both of their parents, Georgette and Humphrey, are from Jamaica.
