= 2019 League1 Ontario season =

League1 Ontario Men's Division
- Season: 2019
- Champions: Master's FA
- Supporters Trophy: Oakville Blue Devils FC
- Matches: 120
- Goals: 385 (3.21 per match)
- Top goalscorer: Maksym Kowal (14)
- Best goalkeeper: Praveen Ahilan (0.43 GAA)

The 2019 Men's League1 Ontario season was the sixth season of play for League1 Ontario, a Division 3 men's soccer league in the Canadian soccer pyramid and the highest level of soccer based in the Canadian province of Ontario.

The league champion earned entry into the 2020 Canadian Championship, the top national tournament for men's soccer teams and the country's only direct path into the CONCACAF Champions League.

== Changes from 2018 ==
The men's division consisted of 16 teams, a decrease from 17 teams in 2018. Durham United FA returned from hiatus, while Sanjaxx Lions and Toronto FC III no longer participate.

For the first time ever, the L1O season did not include a cup competition which had previously been played alongside the regular season. Additionally, the group stage playoff format was changed to a more traditional knockout bracket with two-leg matchups in the quarter-finals and semi-finals.

== Regular season ==
Each team played 15 matches as part of the season; one match against all other teams. The top eight teams qualified for the league playoffs at the end of the season.

| Pos | Team | Pld | W | D | L | GF | GA | GD | Pts | Qualification |
|---|---|---|---|---|---|---|---|---|---|---|
| 1 | Oakville Blue Devils | 15 | 12 | 2 | 1 | 29 | 8 | +21 | 38 | Playoffs |
| 2 | Vaughan Azzurri | 15 | 12 | 1 | 2 | 45 | 15 | +30 | 37 | Playoffs |
| 3 | Alliance United FC | 15 | 11 | 3 | 1 | 28 | 6 | +22 | 36 | Playoffs |
| 4 | Master’s Futbol (C) | 15 | 9 | 3 | 3 | 33 | 18 | +15 | 30 | Playoffs |
| 5 | Sigma FC | 15 | 8 | 3 | 4 | 37 | 25 | +12 | 27 | Playoffs |
| 6 | North Mississauga SC | 15 | 8 | 2 | 5 | 32 | 15 | +17 | 26 | Playoffs |
| 7 | FC London | 15 | 8 | 1 | 6 | 23 | 18 | +5 | 25 (Note: FC London beat Woodbridge Strikers on head-to-head points (3–0).) | Playoffs |
| 8 | Woodbridge Strikers | 15 | 8 | 1 | 6 | 28 | 18 | +10 | 25 | Playoffs |
| 9 | Darby FC | 15 | 7 | 2 | 6 | 35 | 17 | +18 | 23 | |
| 10 | Aurora FC | 15 | 6 | 3 | 6 | 34 | 27 | +7 | 21 | |
| 11 | ProStars FC | 15 | 5 | 2 | 8 | 13 | 31 | −18 | 17 | |
| 12 | Unionville Milliken SC | 15 | 3 | 3 | 9 | 15 | 33 | −18 | 12 | |
| 13 | Windsor TFC | 15 | 3 | 2 | 10 | 11 | 34 | −23 | 11 | |
| 14 | Durham United FA | 15 | 2 | 2 | 11 | 16 | 38 | −22 | 8 | |
| 15 | Toronto Skillz FC | 15 | 2 | 1 | 12 | 5 | 53 | −48 | 7 | |
| 16 | Ottawa South United | 15 | 0 | 1 | 14 | 1 | 29 | −28 | 1 | |

Source: http://www.league1ontario.com/page/show/2309115-standings
Rules for classification: 1) points; 2) total wins; 3) head-to-head points; 4) goal differential; 5) most goals
(C) Champion and qualification to 2020 Canadian Championship

== Playoffs ==
The top eight teams from the regular season qualified for the playoffs. New in 2019, the quarter-finals and semi-finals feature a two-leg format. The two semi-final winners advance to the league championship; the winner of which earn entry into the 2020 Canadian Championship.

=== Bracket ===
Quarter-finals
#1 Oakville Blue Devils | 0 | 2 | 2
#8 Woodbridge Strikers | 0 | 0 | 0
#4 Master’s Futbol | 2 | 5 | 7
#5 Sigma FC | 1 | 1 | 2
#3 Alliance United FC | 3 | 1 | 4
#6 North Mississauga SC | 1 | 0 | 1
#2 Vaughan Azzurri | 1 | 2 | 3
#7 FC London | 2 | 2 | 4

Semi-finals
#1 Oakville Blue Devils | 0 | 2 | 2
#4 Master’s Futbol (a) | 0 | 2 | 2
#3 Alliance United FC | 0 | 0 | 0
#7 FC London | 5 | 10 | 15

Final
#4 Master’s Futbol | 4
#7 FC London | 1

== Statistics ==
=== Top goalscorers ===
| Rank | Player | Club | Goals |
|---|---|---|---|
| 1 | Maksym Kowal | Vaughan Azzurri | 14 |
| 2 | Connor Wilson | FC London | 11 |
| 3 | Filipe Vilela | Aurora FC | 10 |
| 3 | Leaford Allen | Sigma FC | 10 |
| 5 | Francis Ameyaw | Master's Futbol | 8 |
| 5 | Evan James | Oakville Blue Devils | 8 |
| 7 | Niklas Bauer | Aurora FC | 7 |
| 7 | Brandon Duarte | Oakville Blue Devils | 7 |
| 7 | Mathew Santos | Woodbridge Strikers | 7 |
| 10 | 5 players tied | | 6 |

Updated to matches played on August 18, 2019. Source:

=== Top goalkeepers ===
| Rank | Player | Club | Minutes | GAA |
|---|---|---|---|---|
| 1 | Praveen Ahilan | Alliance United FC | 1260 | 0.43 |
| 2 | Lucas Birnstingl | Oakville Blue Devils | 1350 | 0.53 |
| 3 | Kelvin Friseiro | Woodbridge Strikers | 630 | 0.86 |
| 4 | Jared Maloney | North Mississauga SC | 1170 | 0.92 |
| 5 | Anthony Sokalski | FC London | 1254 | 1.22 |

Updated to matches played on August 18, 2019. Minimum 540 minutes played. Source:

== Honours ==
The following awards and nominations were awarded for the 2019 season.

=== Awards ===
| Award | Player | Team | Ref |
|---|---|---|---|
| Most Valuable Player | (Canada) Maksym Kowal | Vaughan Azzurri | |
| Golden Boot | (Canada) Maksym Kowal | Vaughan Azzurri | |
| Coach of the Year | (Canada) Duncan Wilde | Oakville Blue Devils FC | |
| Young Player of the Year | (Canada) Ryan Raposo | Vaughan Azzurri | |
| Top Goalkeeper | (Canada) Lucas Birnstingl | Oakville Blue Devils FC | |
| Top Defender | (Canada) Kenny Lioutas | Alliance United | |
| Top Midfielder | (Canada) Nikola Stakic | Alliance United | |

=== League All-Stars ===
The following players were named League1 Ontario All-Stars for the 2019 season:

First Team All-Star

| Player | Position |
|---|---|
| (Canada) Lukas Birnstingl (Oakville) | Goalkeeper |
| (Canada) Adam Czerkawski (Master's FA) | Defender |
| (Canada) Joe Zupo (Darby FC) | Defender |
| (Canada) Kenny Lioutas (Alliance United) | Defender |
| (Canada) Nikola Stakic (Alliance United) | Midfielder |
| (Canada) Brandon Duarte (Oakville) | Midfielder |
| (Canada) Ethan Gopaul (FC London) | Midfielder |
| (Canada) Adel Rahman (North Mississauga) | Midfielder |
| (Canada) Mohammed Reza Nafar (London) | Forward |
| (Canada) Maksym Kowal (Vaughan Azzurri) | Forward |
| (Canada) Leaford Allen (Sigma FC) | Forward |

Second Team All-Star

| Player | Position |
|---|---|
| (Canada) Praveen Ahilan (Alliance United) | Goalkeeper |
| (Canada) Duran Lee (Vaughan Azzurri) | Defender |
| (Canada) Victor Gallo (Oakville Blue Devils) | Defender |
| (Canada) Carlo Di Feo (Oakville Blue Devils) | Defender |
| (Canada) Riley Ferrazzo (Aurora FC) | Defender |
| (Canada) Justin Stoddart (Sigma FC) | Midfielder |
| (Canada) Isaiah Johnston (Woodbridge) | Midfielder |
| (Canada) Khody Ellis (Oakville Blue Devils) | Midfielder |
| (Canada) Atchuthan Sivanathan (Alliance Utd) | Midfielder |
| (Canada) Connor Wilson (FC London) | Forward |
| (Canada) Felipe Vilela (Aurora FC) | Forward |

Third Team All-Star

| Player | Position |
|---|---|
| (Canada) Matt Zaikos (Darby FC) | Goalkeeper |
| (Canada) Francesco Sinopoli (Woodbridge) | Defender |
| (Canada) Luke Rankin (North Mississauga) | Defender |
| (Canada) Ali Jabara (Ottawa South United) | Defender |
| (Canada) Michael Dirienzo (Unionville Milliken) | Defender |
| (Canada) Satsumi Hirano (Durham United) | Midfielder |
| (Canada) Jason Mills (Vaughan Azzurri) | Midfielder |
| (Canada) Leonardo Ferreira Da Silva (Windsor) | Midfielder |
| (Canada) Anorch Jeyathilaka (Toronto Skillz) | Midfielder |
| (Canada) Francis Ameyaw (Master's FA) | Forward |
| (Guyana) Shaquille Agard (Master's FA) | Forward |

== Reserve Division ==
The league operated a reserve division for the first time in 2019, which would be a U21 division. Participation in the reserve division was optional for the League1 clubs. Two seasons were held - a Summer season and a Fall season. There were 10 teams in the summer session, which included two teams from Sigma FC and two teams from non-L1O clubs - Hamilton United Elite, who planned to enter L1O for the 2020 season and Oakville Soccer Club, while 5 teams participated in the fall session.

=== Summer season ===
| Pos | Team | Pld | W | D | L | GF | GA | GD | Pts |
|---|---|---|---|---|---|---|---|---|---|
| 1 | Oakville Blue Devils Reserves | 12 | 8 | 3 | 1 | 43 | 13 | +30 | 27 |
| 2 | FC London Reserves | 12 | 8 | 3 | 1 | 38 | 13 | +25 | 27 |
| 3 | Vaughan Azzurri Reserves | 12 | 7 | 1 | 4 | 31 | 19 | +12 | 22 |
| 4 | Oakville SC U21 | 12 | 6 | 2 | 4 | 24 | 19 | +5 | 20 |
| 5 | Darby FC Reserves | 12 | 5 | 4 | 3 | 20 | 19 | +1 | 19 |
| 6 | Master’s Futbol Reserves | 12 | 5 | 1 | 6 | 18 | 25 | −7 | 16 |
| 7 | Hamilton United U21 | 12 | 4 | 2 | 6 | 18 | 30 | −12 | 14 |
| 8 | Sigma FC Reserves B1 | 12 | 3 | 4 | 5 | 20 | 23 | −3 | 13 |
| 9 | Sigma FC Reserves B2 | 12 | 3 | 1 | 8 | 21 | 32 | −11 | 10 |
| 10 | ProStars FC Reserves | 12 | 0 | 1 | 11 | 11 | 51 | −40 | 1 |

Source: https://league1.e2esoccer.com/About_ArchivedStats.aspx
Rules for classification: 1) points; 2) total wins; 3) head-to-head points; 4) goal differential; 5) most goals

=== Fall season ===
| Pos | Team | Pld | W | D | L | GF | GA | GD | Pts |
|---|---|---|---|---|---|---|---|---|---|
| 1 | Oakville Blue Devils Reserves | 8 | 8 | 0 | 0 | 30 | 9 | +21 | 24 |
| 2 | Sigma FC Reserves B2 | 8 | 3 | 2 | 3 | 20 | 16 | +4 | 11 |
| 3 | Toronto Skillz Academy | 8 | 3 | 1 | 4 | 15 | 13 | +2 | 10 |
| 4 | Sigma FC Reserves B1 | 7 | 2 | 1 | 4 | 13 | 15 | −2 | 7 |
| 5 | ProStars FC Reserves | 7 | 1 | 0 | 6 | 6 | 31 | −25 | 3 |

Source: https://league1.e2esoccer.com/About_ArchivedStats.aspx
Rules for classification: 1) points; 2) total wins; 3) head-to-head points; 4) goal differential; 5) most goals
