= 2016 League1 Ontario season (women) =

League1 Ontario Women's Division
- Season: 2016
- Champions: FC London
- Cup champions: Vaughan Azzurri
- Matches: 72
- Goals: 307 (4.26 per match)
- Top goalscorer: Jade Kovacevic (26 goals)
- Best goalkeeper: Hope Sabadash (0.29 GAA)
- Biggest home win: Woodbridge 14-0 Darby (June 12, 2016)
- Biggest away win: Darby 0-7 Durham (May 20, 2016)

The 2016 League1 Ontario season was the second season of play for the League1 Ontario Women's Division, a Division 3 semi-professional soccer league in the Canadian soccer pyramid and the highest level of soccer based in the Canadian province of Ontario.

This season saw the departure of two teams from its inaugural season, while four teams joined the league to result in a nine-team competition.

== Changes from 2015 ==
The women's division enters its second season with nine teams, after the addition of four teams (Aurora United FC, Darby FC, Kingston Clippers, and FC London) and the departure of two teams (ANB Futbol and ProStars FC) from the previous season. It will remain in a single-table format for the 2016 season.

== Teams ==
Team	City	Stadium (Capacity)	Founded	First Season	Head Coach
Aurora United FC	Aurora, Ontario	Sheppard's Bush	2015	2016	Ramin Mohammidi
Darby FC	Whitby, Ontario	Whitby Soccer Centre & Darlington Fields	2015	2016	Mirco Schroff
Durham United FA	Pickering, Ontario	Kinsmen Park		2015	Ron Clarke
Kingston Clippers	Kingston, Ontario	Tindall Field, Queen's University	2014	2016	Christian Hoefler
FC London	London, Ontario	German Canadian FC Stadium	2015	2016	Mike Marcoccia
North Mississauga SC	Mississauga, Ontario	Hershey Centre		2015	Jhon Ardila
Sanjaxx Lions	Toronto	Monarch Park Stadium		2015	(Jamaica) Patrick (Laza) Lowe
Vaughan Azzurri	Vaughan, Ontario	McNaughton Park		2015	Carmine Isacco
Woodbridge Strikers	Woodbridge, Ontario	Vaughan Grove		2015	David Porco

Location of teams for the 2016 League1 Ontario Women's Division season.

== Standings ==
Each team plays 16 matches as part of the season; three games split home and away against every other team in the division. There are no playoffs; the first-place team is crowned as league champion at the end of the season.

Pos	Team	Pld	W	D	L	GF	GA	GD	Pts
1	FC London (C)	16	14	0	2	50	15	+35	42
2	Woodbridge Strikers	16	11	3	2	65	13	+52	36
3	Durham United FA	16	9	3	4	38	17	+21	30
4	Vaughan Azzurri (X)	16	8	5	3	41	14	+27	29
5	North Mississauga SC	16	5	5	6	23	30	−7	20
6	Aurora United FC	16	5	3	8	31	34	−3	18
7	Kingston Clippers	16	5	2	9	33	53	−20	17
8	Darby FC	16	2	3	11	15	74	−59	9
9	Sanjaxx Lions	16	1	0	15	11	57	−46	3

Source: http://www.league1ontario.com/page/show/2309115-standings
(C) Champions; (X) L1 Cup winner

== Cup ==
The L1 Cup tournament is a separate contest from the rest of the season, in which all nine teams from the women's division take part. It is not a form of playoffs at the end of the season (as is typically seen in North American sports), but is more like the Canadian Championship or the FA Cup, albeit only for League1 Ontario teams. All matches are separate from the regular season and are not reflected in the season standings.

The cup tournament for the women's division is a single-match knockout tournament with three total rounds culminating in a final match at the end of July, with initial matchups determined by random draw. A preliminary round is also in place to bring the nine total teams from this division down to eight for the quarterfinals. Each match in the tournament must return a result; any match drawn after 90 minutes will advance directly to kicks from the penalty mark instead of extra time.

Preliminary round
Aurora United FC	1
Darby FC	0

Quarterfinals
FC London	2
Aurora United FC	1
Sanjaxx Lions	0
Vaughan Azzurri	2
Kingston Clippers	1
Woodbridge Strikers	7
Durham United FA	1
North Mississauga SC	2

Semifinals
FC London	2 (2)
Vaughan Azzurri (p)	2 (4)
Woodbridge Strikers (p)	1 (3)
North Mississauga SC	1 (1)

Final
Vaughan Azzurri (p)	1 (4)
Woodbridge Strikers	1 (2)

=== Preliminary Round ===
May 17, 2016	Aurora United FC	1–0	Darby FC	Aurora, Ontario
6:30 pm	Bouak 36'	Report; Report		Stadium: Sheppard's Bush

=== Quarterfinals ===
June 22, 2016	FC London	2–1	Aurora United FC	London, Ontario
8:30 pm	Portenay 82'; Kovacevic 90+1'	Report	Reynolds 49'	Stadium: German Canadian FC Stadium

July 1, 2016	Vaughan Azzurri	2–0	Sanjaxx Lions	Vaughan, Ontario
2:00 pm	Richards 56'; Lewis 83'	Report		Stadium: Ontario Soccer Centre

June 22, 2016	Woodbridge Strikers	7–1	Kingston Clippers	Woodbridge, Ontario
9:00 pm		Report		Stadium: Vaughan Grove

June 22, 2016	Durham United FA	1–2	North Mississauga SC	Pickering, Ontario
8:00 pm	Gosse 38' (pen.)	Report	Brunet 9'; Lawes 34'	Stadium: Kinsmen Park

=== Semifinals ===
July 13, 2016	FC London	2–2 (2–4 p)	Vaughan Azzurri	London, Ontario
8:00 pm	Kovacevic 4', 31'	Report; Report	Bukovec 53', 70'	Stadium: German Canadian FC Stadium

July 13, 2016	North Mississauga SC	1–1 (1–3 p)	Woodbridge Strikers	Mississauga, Ontario
8:00 pm	Borgmann 76'	Report; Report	Gurovski 39'	Stadium: Hershey Centre, Field 2
	Penalties
	Borgmann (penalty missed); Edgar (penalty missed); Lawes (penalty scored); Brunet (penalty missed)		(penalty scored) Simpson; (penalty scored) Oduro; (penalty scored) Sabadash

=== Final ===
July 30, 2016	Vaughan Azzurri	1–1 (4–2 p)	Woodbridge Strikers	Vaughan, Ontario
3:30 pm	Fenech 40'	Report	Mottershead 22'	Stadium: Ontario Soccer Centre
	Penalties
	Wong (penalty scored); Piazza (penalty missed); Ghoneim (penalty scored); Lukasewich (penalty scored); Bukovec (penalty scored)		(penalty scored) Simpson; (penalty scored) Oduro; (penalty missed) Dayes; (penalty missed) Syme

== Statistics ==
=== Top Goalscorers ===
Rank	Player	Club	Goals
1	Jade Kovacevic	FC London	26
2	Christabel Oduro	Woodbridge Strikers	12
2	Laura Gosse	Durham United FA	12
4	Jackie Tessier	Kingston Clippers	11
5	Jessica Lisi	Woodbridge Strikers	10
6	Sarah Stratigakis	Aurora United FC	9
7	Lisa Pechersky	Woodbridge Strikers	7
7	Meghan Reynolds	Aurora United FC	7
9	Emily Borgman	North Mississauga SC	6
9	Colleen Beesley	Vaughan Azzurri	6
9	Alyscha Mottershead	Woodbridge Strikers	6
9	Nour Ghoneim	Vaughan Azzurri	6
9	Selah Hopkins	Darby FC	6

=== Top Goalkeepers ===
Rank	Player	Club	Minutes	GAA
1	Hope Sabadash	Woodbridge Strikers	621	0.29
2	Taylor Grant	Vaughan Azzurri	630	0.43
3	Laura Dougall	Durham United FA	810	0.67
4	Tori Edgar	North Mississauga SC	612	0.88
5	Emily Gillet	FC London	1440	0.94
6	Stephanie Bukovec	Vaughan Azzurri	540	1.17
7	Emma Chisholm	Durham United FA	630	1.57
8	Marissa Zucchetto	Aurora United FC	1036	2.17
9	Vanessa Fiore	North Mississauga SC	512	2.29
10	Deanna Persico	Sanjaxx Lions	692	2.73

Minimum 450 minutes played. Source:

== All-star game ==
On July 14, the league announced an all-star game between top players in L1O and a team assembled by the Quebec Soccer Federation.

July 27, 2016	L1O All-Stars (Ontario)	3–0	Quebec All-Stars	Vaughan, Ontario
7:30 pm	Oduro 2'; Syme 37'; Lisi 50'	Report		Stadium: Ontario Soccer Centre

L1O's 20-player roster was selected by coaches and league officials, and contains at least one player from every team in the league. Players denoted by an asterisk (*) are part of the starting 11.

League1 Ontario All-Stars
Pos.	Name	Team
Starters
GK	Stephanie Bukovec	Vaughan Azzurri
D	Tamara Brown	Durham United FA
D	Katherine Herron	Woodbridge Strikers
D	Meghan Scott	FC London
D	Madeline Iozzi	Durham United FA
MF	April Syme	Woodbridge Strikers
MF	Julia Benati	FC London
MF	Cat Rogers	North Mississauga SC
F	Christabel Oduro	Woodbridge Strikers
F	Jade Kovacevic	FC London
F	Laura Gosse	Durham United FA
Substitutes
GK	Hope Sabadash	Woodbridge Strikers
D	Kira Bertrand	North Mississauga SC
D	Mika Richards	Vaughan Azzurri
MF	Alyscha Mottershead	Woodbridge Strikers
MF	Tori Chia	Darby FC
MF	Sarah Stratigakis	Aurora United FC
MF	Sona Makulova	Sanjaxx Lions
F	Jessica Lisi	Woodbridge Strikers
F	Jackie Tessier	Kingston Clippers

Quebec All-Stars
Pos.	Name	Team
Starters
	Lysianne Proulx	AS Varennes
	Nadege Lesperance	Lakeshore SC
	Marike St. Pierre Mousset	CS Longueuil
	Fanny Pelletier-Laroche	Lakeshore SC
	Charlotte Larrivee	Lakeshore SC
	Nahida Baalbaki	FC St. Leonard
	Julie Casselman	Mascouche
	Marika Guay	Lakeshore SC
	Jessica De Filippo	Lakeshore SC
	Sarah Feola	Lakeshore SC
	Audrey-Ann Coughlan	
Substitutes
	Sydney Nelson	Lakeshore SC
	Leonie Portelance	FC Brossard
	Anyssa Ibrahim	AS Varennes
	Caroline Gubernat	Lakeshore SC
	Wayny-Natasha Balata Nguenign	Lakeshore SC
	Julianne Vallerand	AS Varennes
	Sophie Guilmette	Charlesbourg

== Awards ==
Award	Player (Club)
Goal of the Year	Michaela Krampert (North Mississauga SC)
Most Valuable Player	Jade Kovacevic (FC London)
Golden Boot	Jade Kovacevic (FC London)
Coach of the Year	Mike Marcoccia (FC London)
Young Player of the Year	Sarah Stratigakis (Aurora United FC)
Defender of the Year	Tamara Brown (Durham United FA)
Goalkeeper of the Year	Stephanie Bukovec (Vaughan Azzurri)

First Team All-Stars

Goalkeeper	Defenders	Midfielders	Forwards
Stephanie Bukovec (Vaughan Azzurri)	Meagan Scott (FC London); Diamond Simpson (Woodbridge Strikers); Kira Bertrand (North Mississauga SC); Tamara Brown (Durham United FA)	Sarah Stratigakis (Aurora United FC); Alyscha Mottershead (Woodbridge Strikers); Cat Rogers (North Mississauga SC); April Syme (Woodbridge Strikers)	Laura Gosse (Durham United FA); Jade Kovacevic (FC London)

Second Team All-Stars

Goalkeeper	Defenders	Midfielders	Forwards
Hope Sabadash (Woodbridge Strikers)	Shannon Wood (Vaughan Azzurri); Malikae Dawes (Woodbridge Strikers); Kayla DeSouza (Durham United FA)	Riley Filion (Kingston Clippers); Tori Chia (Darby FC); Julia Benati (FC London)	Christabel Oduro (Woodbridge Strikers); Sona Makulova (Sanjaxx Lions); Jackie Tessier (Kingston Clippers); Nour Ghoneim (Vaughan Azzurri)
