= Woodbridge Strikers =

Canadian soccer team

- Full name: Woodbridge Strikers Soccer Club
- Founded: 1976; 50 years ago
- Stadium: Vaughan Grove Park, Vaughan, Ontario
- Capacity: 1000
- President: Mike Rietta
- Head Coach: Peter Pinizzotto (men); Gabe Cremonese (women)
- League: Ontario Premier League
- 2025: L1O-P, 1st (men); L1O-P, 7th (women)
- Website: https://woodbridgesoccer.ca/
Home colours	Away colours

Woodbridge Strikers Soccer Club is a Canadian semi-professional soccer club based in Vaughan, Ontario, representing the city's Woodbridge district. The club was founded in 1976 as a youth soccer club and added its semi-professional club in the Ontario Premier League in 2014. The team plays home games at Vaughan Grove Park.

The club was one of the ten original founding men's teams in League1 Ontario, which was established in 2014, as well as one of eight original founding teams in the League1 Ontario women's division, which was established in 2015.

== History ==
The club's history dates back to 1972, when the East Woodbridge Soccer Club and West Woodbridge Soccer Club were created to serve the still-independent Village of Woodbridge. In 1976, these two clubs merged to form Woodbridge Soccer Club.

In 2014, the semi-professional club was established to play in the newly formed League1 Ontario as one of the founding members.

Woodbridge played their first match on June 1, 2014 against ANB Futbol, which they won 2–1. They finished in second place in the league in each of their first two seasons.

In 2015, Woodbridge won the League1 Ontario League Cup, defeating Sigma FC 2–1 in the finals. They repeated as champions in the 2017 League1 Ontario League Cup with a 3–1 victory over Vaughan Azzurri in the finals. They lost in the 2017 League1 Championship final to the Oakville Blue Devils in a penalty shoot-out, narrowly missing out on the opportunity to represent the league in the 2018 Canadian Championship as a result. They again lost in the 2018 Playoff Final, this time against Vaughan Azzurri, missing out on the Canadian Championship for the second consecutive year.

They added a women's club to participate in the inaugural season of the League1 Ontario women's division in 2015. In their debut season, they finished second in the league. In 2018, the women won their first trophy, capturing the League Cup. In 2021, the women captured their first League1 Championship, defeating Blue Devils FC 1-0 in the finals.

In 2025, Woodbridge won the League1 Ontario Premier title, qualifying them to serve as the league's representative in the 2026 Canadian Championship.

== Seasons ==
=== Men ===
Season	League	Teams	Record	Rank	Playoffs	League Cup	Ref
2014	League1 Ontario	9	10–3–3	2nd	–	Group stage	
2015	League1 Ontario	12	15–2–5	2nd	–	Champions	
2016	League1 Ontario	16	15–2–5	2nd, Eastern (2nd overall)	did not qualify	Runner-up	
2017	League1 Ontario	16	15–5–2	1st, Eastern (3rd overall)	Runner-up	Champions	
2018	League1 Ontario	17	8–4–4	6th	Runner-up	Quarter-finals	
2019	League1 Ontario	16	8–1–6	8th	Quarter-finals	–	
2020	League1 Ontario	Season cancelled due to COVID-19 pandemic					
2021	League1 Ontario	15	6–1–5	3rd, East (7th overall)	did not qualify	–	
2022	League1 Ontario	22	8–5–8	11th	did not qualify	–	
2023	League1 Ontario	21	6–8–6	12th	did not qualify	–	
2024	League1 Ontario Premier	12	10–7–5	3rd	–	Round of 16	
2025	League1 Ontario Premier	11	13–4–3	Champions	–	Semi-finals	

=== Women ===
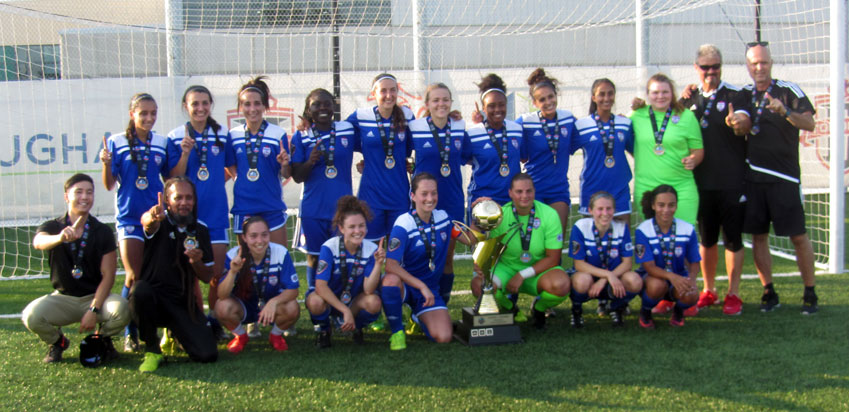
Woodbridge Strikers win 2018 L1O League Cup

Season	League	Teams	Record	Rank	Playoffs	League Cup	Ref
2015	League1 Ontario	7	13–2–3	2nd	–	Semi-finals	
2016	League1 Ontario	9	11–3–2	2nd	–	Finalists	
2017	League1 Ontario	11	9–2–9	7th	–	Finalists	
2018	League1 Ontario	13	9–3–0	2nd	Finalists	Champions	
2019	League1 Ontario	14	7–1–5	4th	Semi-finals	–	
2020	League1 Ontario	Season cancelled due to COVID-19 pandemic					
2021	League1 Ontario	7	6–3–3	2nd	Champions	–	
2022	League1 Ontario	20	12–6–1	3rd	Quarter-finals	–	
2023	League1 Ontario	19	10–4–4	5th	Quarter-finals	–	
2024	League1 Ontario Premier	10	9–3–6	4th	–	Quarter-finals	
2025	League1 Ontario Premier	10	4–4–10	7th	–	Round of 16	

== Honours ==
Men

- League1 Ontario Premier: 2025
- L1O Cup: 2015, 2017

Women

- League1 Ontario: 2021
- L1O Cup: 2018

== Notable former players ==
The following players have either played at the professional or international level, either before or after playing for the League1 Ontario team:

=== Men ===
- (Canada) Stephen Afrifa
- (Canada) Ezequiel Carrasco
- (Canada) Dylan Carreiro
- (Canada) Oscar Cordon
- (Canada) Nathan Dossantos
- (Canada) Giuliano Frano
- (Canada) Andrés Fresenga
- (Canada) Victor Gallo
- (Canada) Isaiah Johnston
- (Canada) Marcos Nunes
- (Pakistan) Navid Rahman
- (Antigua and Barbuda) (Canada) Tyrell Rayne
- (Guyana) (Canada) Quillan Roberts
- (Canada) Tarik Robertson
- (Canada) Roberto Stillo
- (Canada) Julian Uccello
- (Grenada) (Canada) Davier Walcott
- (Canada) Armaan Wilson
- (Canada) Lowell Wright

=== Women ===
- (Guyana) (Canada) Calaigh Copland
- (Jamaica) (Canada) Malikae Dayes
- (Jamaica) (Canada) Mikayla Dayes
- (Jamaica) (Canada) Chanel Hudson-Marks
- (Jamaica) (Canada) Jayda Hylton-Pelaia
- (Ukraine) (Canada) Nicole Kozlova
- (Canada) Alyscha Mottershead
- (Canada) Christabel Oduro
- (Canada) Lisa Pechersky
- (Canada) Diamond Simpson
- (Slovakia) Anika Tóth
