= Hamilton United =

Canadian soccer team

- Full name: Hamilton United Elite Soccer Club
- Founded: 2013
- Stadium: Ron Joyce Stadium; Tim Hortons Field (certain games)
- Head Coach: Francesco Cardillo (men); Carmine Lancia (women)
- League: League1 Ontario
- 2025: L1O-C, 12th (men); L1O-C, 2nd - promoted (women)
- Website: https://www.hamutd.com

Hamilton United is a Canadian semi-professional soccer club based in Hamilton, Ontario that plays in the League1 Ontario men's and women's divisions.

== History ==
Original club logo

The club was founded in 2013 by local clubs Saltfleet-Stoney Creek SC, Mount Hamilton Youth SC, and Ancaster SC to foster youth development.

The club's first team entered the League1 Ontario women's division in 2018. They played their inaugural match against West Ottawa SC on April 28.

In 2020, they added a team in the men's division, although their debut was delayed due to the COVID-19 pandemic. As preparation for the top division, they fielded a team in the L1O men's Reserve division in 2019. After once again fielding only a team in the reserve division in 2021 due to the pandemic, Hamilton's men's team finally made their debut in the main division in 2022, on April 26, defeating Burlington SC 2–0.

In 2021 Toronto FC announced Mount Hamilton Youth SC, which would be rebranded to Hamilton TFC, as a new regional partner.

In 2023, they became an official youth development club of professional Canadian Premier League club Forge FC, updating their club badge and colours to match Forge's orange, grey, and white.

== Seasons ==
Men

Season	League	Teams	Record	Rank	Playoffs	League Cup	Ref
2022	League1 Ontario	22	10–1–10	8th	Did not qualify	Not held	
2023	League1 Ontario	21	7–5–8	11th	Did not qualify	Not held	
2024	League1 Ontario Premier	12	0–5–17	12th ↓	–	Round of 32	
2025	League1 Ontario Championship	12	0–5–17	12th	–	Round of 32	

Women

Season	League	Teams	Record	Rank	Playoffs	League Cup	Ref
2018	League1 Ontario	13	5–3–4	7th	Did not qualify	Round of 16	
2019	League1 Ontario	14	4–1–8	12th	Quarter-finals	–	
2020	League1 Ontario	Season cancelled due to COVID-19 pandemic					
2021	League1 Ontario	7	4–1–7	5th	Did not qualify	–	
2022	League1 Ontario	20	3–1–15	18th	Did not qualify	–	
2023	League1 Ontario	19	5–3–10	15th	Did not qualify	–	
2024	League1 Ontario Championship	10	9–4–5	3rd	–	Round of 32	
2025	League1 Ontario Championship	9	9–2–5	2nd	–	Round of 32	

== Notable former players ==
The following players have either played at the professional or international level, either before or after playing for the League1 Ontario team:

=== Men ===
- (Canada) Obrad Bejatović
- (Canada) Antony Caceres
- (Canada) Malik Henry
- (Canada) Taha Ilyass
- (Central African Republic) Moussa Limane
- (Antigua and Barbuda) Taj Moore
- (Ghana) Gideon Waja

=== Women ===
- (Canada) Paige Culver
