= DeRo United Futbol Academy =

Canadian soccer team

DeRo TFC DeRo United Futbol Academy
- Full name: DeRo United Futbol Academy
- Nickname: DUFA
- Founded: 2012
- Stadium: L'Amoreaux Park; Scarborough, Toronto, Ontario
- Founder: Dwayne De Rosario
- League: League1 Ontario
- 2019: League1 Ontario, 9th
- Website: https://www.derotfc.ca/

DeRo TFC (formerly DeRo United Futbol Academy) is a Canadian soccer academy founded in 2012 by former Canadian professional soccer player Dwayne De Rosario based in the Scarborough district of Toronto, Ontario. They previously fielded a Canadian women's semi-professional soccer club that played in the League1 Ontario women's division.

== History ==
Original logo

The academy was founded in 2012 by Dwayne De Rosario to foster development for youth soccer players of both genders.

In 2018, they added a semi-professional team in the women's division of League1 Ontario with the core of their roster featuring many U21, university varsity, and post-university players of high quality. Peyvand Mossavat was named the semi-pro team's head coach. They defeated Durham United FA 2–0 on April 27 in their debut league match. They finished in sixth place in their inaugural season, narrowly missing a playoff berth. They were not listed as returning for the 2020 season.

In June 2021, the club became an official affiliate team of De Rosario's former club Toronto FC, joining their academy system and re-branded as DeRo TFC.

== Seasons ==
Women

Season	League	Teams	Record	Rank	Playoffs	League Cup	Ref
2018	League1 Ontario	13	6–3–3	6th	did not qualify	Semi-finals	
2019	League1 Ontario	14	5–3–5	9th	did not qualify	—	

== Notable players ==
- (Canada) Melanie Forbes
- (Canada) Nicola Golen
- (Israel) (Canada) Vital Kats
- (Ukraine) (Canada) Nicole Kozlova
- (Canada) Olivia Mbala
- (Canada) Deanne Rose
