= Toronto Azzurri Blizzard =

Canadian soccer team

- Full name: Toronto Azzurri Blizzard
- Founded: 2017
- Stadium: Azzurri Village
- Head Coach: Joe Parolini
- League: League1 Ontario
- 2018: League1 Ontario, 13th
- Website: http://www.torontoblizzard.com

Toronto Azzurri Blizzard was a Canadian women's semi-professional soccer club based in Toronto, Ontario that competed in the women's division League1 Ontario. The club was formed as a partnership between two local area clubs - Toronto Blizzard SC and Toronto Azzurri SC.

== History ==
The club was founded in 2017 as a joint partnership between Toronto clubs Toronto Blizzard SC and Toronto Azzurri SC. The Toronto Blizzard SC was a re-formed club from the original club of the same name that played professionally in the NASL. They played their home matches at Azzurri Village in North York.

The club joined the women's division of League1 Ontario for the 2017 season. They played their first match against Sanjaxx Lions, losing 1–0. After a 2018 season in which they lost every game of the season, they left the league following the 2018 season.

== Seasons ==
Women

Season	League	Teams	Record	Rank	Playoffs	League Cup	Ref
2017	League1 Ontario	11	6–4–10	9th	–	Round of 16	
2018	League1 Ontario	13	0–0–12	13th	Did not qualify	Quarter-finals	

== Notable former players ==
The following players have either played at the professional or international level, either before or after playing for the League1 Ontario team:

- (Jamaica) (Canada) Malikae Dayes
- (Jamaica) (Canada) Mikayla Dayes
- (Canada) Diamond Simpson
