= Aurora FC (Canada) =

Canadian soccer team

- Full name: Aurora Football Club
- Nickname: Aurora Stingers
- Founded: 1964 (as Aurora Youth Soccer Club)
- Dissolved: 2020 (semi-pro team only)
- Stadium: Stewart Burnett Park
- League: League1 Ontario
- 2019: League1 Ontario, 10th Playoffs: DNQ
- Website: www.aysc.ca

Aurora FC is a Canadian youth soccer club and former semi-professional team based in Aurora, Ontario. The club was founded in 1964 as Aurora Youth Soccer Club and added its semi-professional team to League1 Ontario in 2016.

The semi-professional team was initially known as Aurora United FC in its debut season, before shortening the name to Aurora FC in 2017. The team played its home games at Stewart Burnett Park, which was opened in 2018. They departed League1 Ontario in 2020, becoming an affiliate club of Simcoe County Rovers and transferring their League1 Ontario license to them.

== History ==
Club logo used in 2016

The club was founded in 1964 as Aurora Youth Soccer Club.

In 2015, while playing in the amateur Ontario Soccer League, the team was invited by the Peru Olympic football team to play an exhibition match, after Peru had finished playing in the 2015 Pan American Games. The Peruvians defeated Aurora 5–0.

The team added its semi-professional teams in League1 Ontario in the men's and women's division in 2016 under the name Aurora United FC. The men's team announced former Canadian national team and Toronto FC player Jim Brennan as its first head coach. They played their inaugural match on April 29, 2016 on the road against Durham United FC, which ended in a 2–1 defeat. The women's team debuted on May 7 against Vaughan Azzurri with a 1–1 draw.

In 2017, the semi-professional teams and youth club decided to formally adopt the same Aurora FC name and logo. Jim Brennan left the club in 2018 to join the newly created Canadian Premier League, as head coach of York9 FC. The club did not return to League1 Ontario for the 2021 season, and instead became an affiliate club of new team Simcoe County Rovers, transferring their League1 Ontario license to them.

== Seasons ==
=== Men ===
Season	League	Teams	Record	Rank	Playoffs	League Cup	Ref
2016	League1 Ontario	16	4–3–15	8th, Eastern (13th)	Did not qualify	Quarter-finals	
2017	League1 Ontario	16	2–2–17	8th, Eastern (15th)	Did not qualify	Round of 16	
2018	League1 Ontario	17	3–3–10	15th	Did not qualify	Round of 16	
2019	League1 Ontario	16	6–3–6	10th	Did not qualify	–	
2020	Season cancelled due to COVID-19 pandemic						

=== Women ===
Season	League	Teams	Record	Rank	Playoffs	League Cup	Ref
2016	League1 Ontario	9	5–3–8	6th	–	Quarter-finals	
2017	League1 Ontario	11	9–2–9	6th	–	Round of 16	
2018	League1 Ontario	13	2–2–8	11th	Did not qualify	Quarter-finals	
2019	League1 Ontario	14	1–2–10	13th	Did not qualify	–	
2020	Season cancelled due to COVID-19 pandemic						

== Notable former players ==
=== Men ===
- (Sweden) Simon Adjei
- (Canada) Oumar Diallo
- (Bulgaria) Kiril Dimitrov
- (Canada) Morey Doner
- (Canada) Max Ferrari
- (Canada) Riley Ferrazzo
- (Canada) Alistair Johnston

=== Women ===
- (Guyana) (Canada) Dana Bally
- (Albania) (Canada) Markela Bejleri
- (Canada) Melanie Forbes
- (Saint Kitts and Nevis) (Canada) Quinn Josiah
- (Israel) (Canada) Vital Kats
- (Ukraine) (Canada) Nicole Kozlova
- (Dominican Republic) (Canada) Yoana Peralta
- (Canada) Victoria Pickett
- (Canada) Olivia Scott
- (Canada) Sarah Stratigakis
- (Saint Kitts and Nevis) (Canada) Cloey Uddenberg
