= Blue Devils FC =

Ontario amateur soccer club

- Full name: Blue Devils Football Club
- Founded: 2015; 11 years ago
- Stadium: Sheridan Trafalgar Stadium
- President: Steven Caldwell
- Head coach: Duncan Wilde (men); Garrett Peters (women)
- League: League1 Ontario
- 2024: L1O-P, 7th (men); L1O-P, 10th - relegated (women)
- Website: https://www.bluedevils.ca/
Home colours	Away colours

Blue Devils Football Club (formerly known as Oakville Blue Devils FC) was a semi-professional soccer club based in Oakville, Ontario in League1 Ontario's men's and women's divisions. In October 2024, they merged under Oakville SC's branding, under which they now operate.

== History ==
=== Past teams of same name ===
logo of the original Oakville Blue Devils

The original Oakville Blue Devils was a member team of the Oakville Soccer Club. The team was built, coached and developed by Phil Iafrati (1947–2013), where they won the U19 provincial and national championships in 1998. As the Devils reached the end of the youth soccer circuit that season, Iafrati restarted the program with the a U9 program Oakville Blue Stars in 1999.

In 2005, the second edition of the Blue Devils were formed when the Scarborough-based Metro Lions of the Canadian Professional Soccer League relocated to Oakville and adopted the Blue Devils name, coached by Duncan Wilde. They won the 2005 season defeating Vaughan Shooters in the final. In 2006, Wilde left to manage the Toronto Lynx, which resulted in a mass exodus of players not returning. The club was relocated in 2007 and became Brampton United, bringing to an end the period of the Oakville Blue Devils history.

=== Revival ===
Club logo from 2015 to 2020

In 2015, the club was founded to play in the semi-professional League1 Ontario, named after the original team from prior years. The Toronto Lynx men's senior team was incorporated into the Oakville team and in late 2017, the teams merged completely under Oakville's umbrella. In their inaugural L1O season, they were crowned league champions and qualified for the Inter-Provincial Cup against the champion of the Première Ligue de soccer du Québec to determine the Canadian Division III champion, where they defeated CS Mont-Royal Outremont to win the title. In 2017, they won their second title, defeating Woodbridge Strikers in the Championship final on penalty kicks.

In 2018, the team played in the Canadian Championship for the first time where they lost in the first qualifying round against 2017 PLSQ champion AS Blainville. Later, during the 2018 season, they played a friendly against Italian professional Serie A club Frosinone Calcio, losing by a score of 2–0.

Also in 2018, the club added a team in the women's division of League1 Ontario, beginning in the 2018 season. In their second season, the women advanced to the Championship Final, where they were defeated by FC London. In 2021, the women once again finished as runner-ups after being defeated in the finals by the Woodbridge Strikers.

In 2020, the club merged with GPS Academy and was renamed to Blue Devils FC. The men finished as runner-ups in both 2021 and 2022, being defeated in the Championship Finals by Guelph United FC and Vaughan Azzurri, respectively.

=== Merger and future ===
In August 2023, they formed a partnership with youth club Oakville SC. In October 2024, they fully merged with the club under the Oakville SC banner.

== Front office and technical Staff ==
As of July 18, 2018

Name	Position
(England) Duncan Wilde	League1 head coach
(England) Billy Steele	U21 head coach and senior assistant coach
(Canada) Glenn McNamara	Goalkeeper coach
(Scotland) Steven Caldwell	President
(England) Brett Mosen	Technical staff
(Canada) Kim Ashton	Operations manager

== Seasons ==
Men
Season	League	Teams	Record	Rank	Playoffs	League Cup	Canadian Championship	Ref
2015	League1 Ontario	12	17–2–3	Champions	–	Group stage	–	
2016	League1 Ontario	16	8–4–10	6th, Western (10th overall)	did not qualify	First round	–	
2017	League1 Ontario	16	18–2–2	1st, Western (1st overall)	Champions	First round	–	
2018	League1 Ontario	17	10–5–1	3rd	Group stage	Semifinals	First qualifying round	
2019	League1 Ontario	16	12–2–1	1st	Semifinals	–	Did not qualify	
2020	League1 Ontario	Season cancelled due to COVID-19 pandemic						
2021	League1 Ontario	15	9–2–1	2nd, West (3rd overall)	Finalists	–	Did not qualify	
2022	League1 Ontario	22	14–5–2	2nd	Finalists	–	Did not qualify	
2023	League1 Ontario	21	12–3–5	4th	Semi-finals	–	Did not qualify	
2024	League1 Ontario Premier	12	8–6–8	7th	–	Semi-Finals	Did not qualify	

Women
Season	League	Teams	Record	Rank	Playoffs	League Cup	Ref
2018	League1 Ontario	13	7–1–4	5th	did not qualify	Round of 16	
2019	League1 Ontario	14	11–0–2	1st	Finalists	–	
2020	League1 Ontario	Season cancelled due to COVID-19 pandemic					
2021	League1 Ontario	7	6–1–5	4th	Finalists	–	
2022	League1 Ontario	20	5–4–10	15th	Did not qualify	–	
2023	League1 Ontario	19	7–3–8	11th	Did not qualify	–	
2024	League1 Ontario Premier	10	0–1–17	10th ↓	–	Round of 16	

== Honours ==
- League1 Ontario Championship: 2015, 2017
- Inter-Provincial Cup: 2015

== Notable players ==
The following players have either played at the professional or international level, either before or after playing for the League1 Ontario team:

=== Men ===
- (Canada) Stephen Ademolu
- (Canada) Prince Amanda
- (Guyana) Adrian Butters
- (Canada) Zak Drake
- (Canada) Victor Gallo
- (Trinidad and Tobago) Judah Hernandez
- (Canada) Taha Ilyass
- (Canada) Evan James
- (Canada) Taylor McNamara
- (Canada) Monti Mohsen
- (Canada) Anthony Novak
- (Canada) Marcos Nunes
- (Canada) Kyle Porter
- (Canada) Reshon Phillip
- (Pakistan) Navid Rahman
- (Canada) Tarik Robertson
- (Canada) Cyrus Rollocks
- (Canada) Rahim Thorpe
- (Canada) David Velastegui

=== Women ===
- (Egypt) Mahira Ali
- (Guyana) (Canada) Dana Bally
- (Canada) Paige Culver
- (Egypt) Rana Hamdy
- (Jamaica) (Canada) Oshay Nelson-Lawes
- (Philippines) (Canada) Ivymae Perez
- (Guyana) (Canada) Justine Rodrigues
- (Philippines) (Canada) Jesse Shugg
- (Canada) Sarah Stratigakis
- (Guyana) (Canada) Jade Vyfhuis
