= North Mississauga SC =

Canadian soccer team

- Full name: North Mississauga Soccer Club
- Nickname: NMSC Panthers
- Founded: 1982; 44 years ago
- Stadium: Mattamy Sports Park
- Head Coach: Amir Riazi (men); Peyvand Mossavat (women)
- League: League1 Ontario
- 2025: L1O-C, 9th (men); L1O-P, 8th (women)
- Website: https://www.nmsc.net
Home colours	Away colours

North Mississauga Soccer Club is a Canadian semi-professional soccer club based in Mississauga, Ontario. The club was founded in 1982 as a youth soccer club and added its men's semi-professional club in League1 Ontario in 2016. The team plays home games at Mattamy Sports Park.

The club was one of the eight original founding women's teams in the League1 Ontario women's division, which was established in 2015.

== History ==
The club's foundation dates back to 1974, when they were known as Streetsville Meadowvale Soccer Club. They officially registered the club as a non-profit entity in 1982 and in 1995 changed the club's name to North Mississauga Soccer Club. In 2000, the club's U17 boys team, nicknamed the Panthers, won the U17 Ontario Cup and National Championship, and the club adopted the Panthers nickname for all its teams the following season to mark the achievement.

Originally solely a youth soccer club, the team added semi-professional teams in League1 Ontario in the men's and women's divisions in 2015 and 2016, respectively.

In 2015, the women's team won the first League1 Ontario League Cup.

The Mississauga-based League1 Ontario teams - Sigma FC and North Mississauga (and formerly the now-Brampton-based ProStars FC) - compete annually for the Credit River Cup, awarded by the Sauga City Collective supporters group, with the team's matches against each other during the L1O deciding the victor.In 2019, the men won the inaugural title. A local Mississauga-based Toronto FC supporters group, Rogue Street Elite, has also become a supporters group for the club.

In 2015, the club was surprised when they received financial solidarity compensation from West Ham United, as part of the transfer fee for former youth player Doneil Henry, who transferred to West Ham from Cypriot club Apollon Limassol. In 2016, they later received another solidarity payment Liverpool for the transfer of Liam Millar from Fulham.

In October 2023, the club will re-brand to Liverpool Football Club International Academy Mississauga (Liverpool IA Mississauga), forming a relationship with the English club Liverpool's academy.

== Seasons ==
=== Men ===
Season	League	Teams	Record	Rank	Playoffs	League Cup	Ref
2016	League1 Ontario	16	11–5–6	4th, West (7th overall)	Did not qualify	Round of 16	
2017	League1 Ontario	16	9–2–11	5th, West (10th overall)	Did not qualify	Semi-finals	
2018	League1 Ontario	17	3–4–9	13th	Did not qualify	Round of 16	
2019	League1 Ontario	16	8–2–5	6th	Quarter-finals	–	
2020	League1 Ontario	Season cancelled due to COVID-19 pandemic					
2021	League1 Ontario	15	1–2–9	7th, West (13th overall)	Did not qualify	–	
2022	League1 Ontario	22	4–2–15	21st	Did not qualify	–	
2023	League1 Ontario	21	5–5–10	17th	Did not qualify	–	
2024	League1 Ontario Championship	10	4–7–7	7th	–	Round of 32	
2025	League1 Ontario Championship	12	6–7–9	9th	–	Round of 16	

=== Women ===
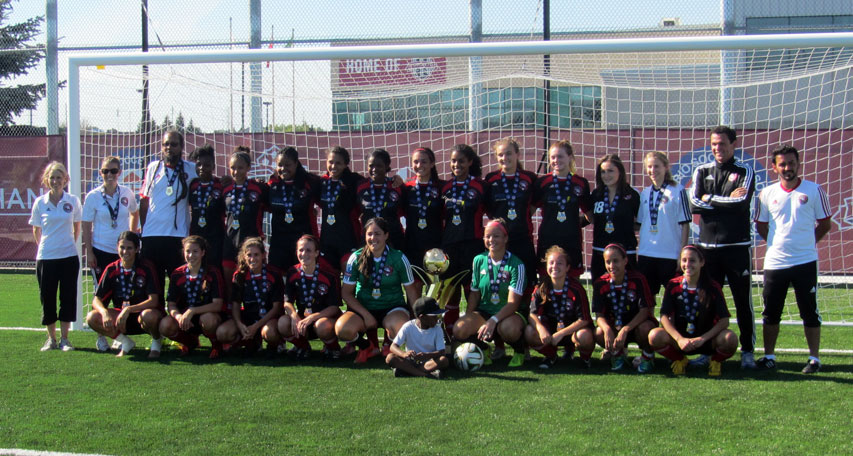
NMSC women win 2015 L1O League Cup

Season	League	Teams	Record	Rank	Playoffs	League Cup	Ref
2015	League1 Ontario	7	8–3–7	4th	–	Champions	
2016	League1 Ontario	9	5–5–6	5th	–	Semi-finals	
2017	League1 Ontario	11	11–6–3	3rd	–	Quarter-finals	
2018	League1 Ontario	13	4–0–8	9th	Did not qualify	Quarter-finals	
2019	League1 Ontario	14	0–0–13	14th	Did not qualify	–	
2020	League1 Ontario	Season cancelled due to COVID-19 pandemic					
2021	League1 Ontario	Did not enter due to COVID-19 pandemic					
2022	League1 Ontario	20	9–1–9	9th	Did not qualify	–	
2023	League1 Ontario	19	7–6–5	9th	Did not qualify	–	
2024	League1 Ontario Premier	10	3–4–11	9th	–	Round of 16	
2025	League1 Ontario Premier	10	3–4–11	8th	–	Quarter-finals	

== Notable former players ==
The following players have either played at the professional or international level, either before or after playing for the League1 Ontario team:

=== Men ===
- (Jamaica) Shawn Brown
- (Canada) Wesley Cain
- (Chinese Taipei) Emilio Estevez
- (Canada) Gabe Gala
- (Canada) Duran Lee
- (Canada) Joey Melo
- (Pakistan) Navid Rahman
- (Jamaica) Camaal Reid
- (Canada) Kadell Thomas
- (Canada) Rahim Thorpe
- (Grenada) (Canada) Davier Walcott
- (Guyana) (Canada) Anthony Whyte
- (Guyana) (Canada) Daniel Whyte

=== Women ===
- (Albania) (Canada) Markela Bejleri
- (Dominica) (Canada) Kira Bertrand
- (Dominica) (Canada) Kylee Bertrand
- (Guyana) (Canada) Calaigh Copland
- (Guyana) (Canada) Kayla De Souza
- (Jamaica) Courtney Douglas
- (Sweden) (Canada) Mollie Eriksson
- (Jamaica) (Canada) Chanel Hudson-Marks
- (Jamaica) (Canada) Oshay Nelson-Lawes
