= Alyscha Mottershead =

Canadian soccer player (born 1991)

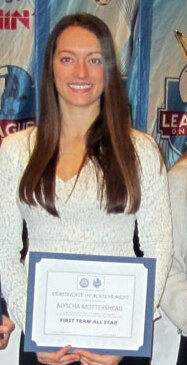
- Mottershead in 2016

Personal information
- Date of birth: 25 May 1991 (age 35)
- Place of birth: Orangeville, Ontario, Canada
- Height: 5 ft 6 in (1.68 m)
- Position: Midfielder

Youth career
- Brams United SC

College career
Years	Team	Apps	(Gls)
2009–2012	Syracuse Orange	74	(10)

Senior career*
Years	Team	Apps	(Gls)
2009-2011	Toronto Lady Lynx		
2013	Ottawa Fury		
2014	SC Sand	6	(0)
2015-2018	Woodbridge Strikers	37+	(9+)

International career
2008	Canada U17	6	(0)
2011	Canada	2	(0)

Managerial career
- 2014: Syracuse Orange (asst.)
- * Club domestic league appearances and goals as of 14 December 2019

Alyscha Mottershead (born May 2, 1991) is a Canadian former soccer player.

== Life and career ==
Mottershead was born in Orangeville, Ontario, but was raised in Brampton. She played for Syracuse University, recording 74 matches played with 10 goals scored. At the club level, Mottershead played for SC Sand at the German 2. Bundesliga. Internationally, she represented Canada U17s at the 2008 CONCACAF Women's U-17 Championship where her team finished third and qualified for the 2008 FIFA U-17 Women's World Cup which Mottershead also participated representing Canada. On November 22, 2011, she debuted for the Canadian Senior Team against Sweden. In 2012, Mottershead was part of the squad that represented Canada at the 2012 CONCACAF Women's Olympic Qualifying Tournament where the Canadians finished second (just behind the United States) and, therefore, qualified for the 2012 Summer Olympics. In 2013, she played for Ottawa Fury.
