= Ontario Premier League (women) =

Semi-pro soccer league in Ontario, Canada

Ontario Premier League; Women's Division
- Organising body: Ontario Soccer Association
- Founded: January 2015
- First season: 2015
- Country: Canada
- Confederation: CONCACAF
- Divisions: 3 tiers
- Number of clubs: 10 (OPL1); 10 (OPL2); 20 (OPL3)
- Level on pyramid: 3
- Current champions: Simcoe County Rovers FC (2026)
- Current OPL Cup: Guelph United FC (2026)
- Most championships: FC London (3 titles)
- Most OPL Cups: FC London (2 titles)
- Website: www.oplsoccer.ca
- Current: 2026 Ontario Premier League season (women)

The Ontario Premier League (formerly League1 Ontario) is a semi-professional women's soccer league in Ontario, Canada. The league is sanctioned by the Canadian Soccer Association and the Ontario Soccer Association as a pro-am league in the Canadian soccer league system. The Ontario Premier League is part of Premier Soccer Leagues Canada, the national third tier with regional divisions, with equivalents in Alberta, British Columbia, the Prairies, and Quebec.

The women's division launched in 2015 with seven clubs and has grown to twenty clubs for the 2022 season. Beginning in 2024, the league became a three-tier league featuring promotion and relegation. In 2026, League1 Ontario rebranded as the Ontario Premier League (OPL).

== History ==
League1 Ontario was founded as a men's semi-professional league on November 15, 2013, in an announcement by the Ontario Soccer Association (OSA).

In January 2015, L1O announced the launch of a women's division. Initially, six teams (ANB Futbol, Durham United FC, North Mississauga SC, ProStars FC, Sanjaxx Lions and Vaughan Azzurri) were to compete, but a seventh team (Woodbridge Strikers) was soon added ahead of the inaugural season. The league kicked off their first matches on May 23 with all seven teams playing matches at Tim Hortons Field in Hamilton (Ottawa Fury FC Academy also fielded a team for an exhibition match to make an even number so that every team could play). Durham United FC defeated North Mississauga SC by a score of 2–0 in the league's first official match. Durham United were the inaugural league champions. while North Mississauga won the first League Cup title.

For the 2016 season, the division grew to nine teams with the addition of four teams, while two clubs departed. The league grew to 11 teams in 2017, with three new additions and one departure. In 2018, the league grew to 13 teams and the league introduced a playoff format for the first time to declare the league champion. For the 2019 season, the league eliminated the League Cup competition.

Beginning in the 2020 season, League1 Ontario and the Première ligue de soccer du Québec had planned to hold a Final Four end-of-season tournament for their women's divisions, from August 14 to 16, pitting the top two sides from each league in an inter-provincial playoff. Also, the league had planned to introduce a Reserve Division for the women for the first time. However, due to restrictions associated with the COVID-19 pandemic, the league cancelled the 2020 season and delayed the start of the 2021 season. Due to the delayed start caused by the pandemic, some clubs were unable to field team's in the main division. Consequently, the league also formed a short-season summer division, with teams opting to either play in the full-season Premier division, the short-season Champion, and/or the Reserve division.

On January 25, 2022, League1 Ontario announced a major restructuring of the men's and women's competitions which took effect in 2024. The league was split into three tiers (Premier, Championship, and League2) with promotion and relegation between the tiers. From this point onward, expansion clubs enter at the League2 level and have to win to earn promotion to the Championship and then Premier divisions. Also in 2024 was the return of the L1 Cup, a league cup knockout tournament which features teams from all three tiers in the L1O system.

=== Management ===
In September 2019, former Canadian national team player Carmelina Moscato was announced as Commissioner of the Women's division (prior to this both the male and female divisions were led by Dino Rossi), however she departed in December 2020 to become the Director of Women's Football for the Bahamas Football Association. In March 2021, Chelsea Spencer and Julie Maheu were announced as Director and Operations Manager, respectively, for the league.

In January 2026, the league re-branded as the Ontario Premier League, in line with a move across all the leagues in Canada.

== Competition format ==
The Ontario Premier League regular season runs from May through September using a single table format, with each team playing one match against all other teams. The top four teams compete in the league playoffs at the end of the season.

Beginning in 2019, the Ron Smale Cup was created by the supporters group of North Mississauga SC to be given to the regular season champions.

=== OPL Cup ===
The OPL Cup (originally known as the L1 Cup) is a league cup tournament that features all OPL clubs. It runs concurrently with the regular season, with cup games usually taking place during mid-week. It is not a form of playoffs and all matches are separate from the regular season and are not reflected in the season standings. The 2015 cup included a group stage and a knockout stage but from 2016 to 2018 the format was a single-elimination tournament. Following a hiatus from 2019 to 2023, the OPL Cup returned in 2024, coinciding with the league's restructuring.

=== Yearly results ===
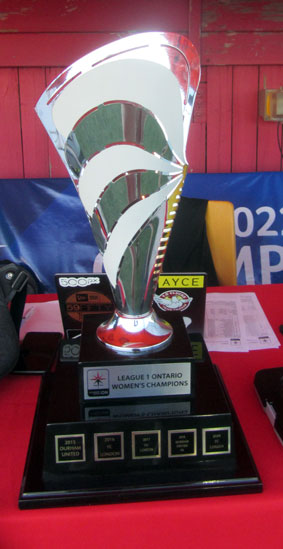
League1 Ontario women's Championship Trophy

Trophy winners (2015–2023)
Season	Teams	Regular season	Playoffs	L1 Cup
2015	7	Durham United FC	—	North Mississauga SC
2016	9	FC London	—	Vaughan Azzurri
2017	11	FC London	—	FC London
2018	13	FC London	Durham United FA	Woodbridge Strikers
2019	14	Oakville Blue Devils FC	FC London	—
2020	13	Season cancelled due to COVID-19 pandemic		
2021	7 (Note: Originally, 15 clubs were set to participate, but some clubs opted out of the main division due to scheduling impacts caused by the COVID-19 pandemic. Some clubs participated in a separate short-season division.)	FC London	Woodbridge Strikers	—
2022	20	Vaughan Azzurri	NDC Ontario	—
2023	19	NDC Ontario	Alliance United FC	—

Trophy winners (2024–present)
Season	OPL1	OPL2	OPL3	OPL Cup
2024	NDC Ontario	BVB IA Waterloo	Vaughan Azzurri B	FC London
2025	Simcoe County Rovers FC	Scrosoppi FC	Woodbridge Strikers B	North Toronto Nitros
2026	Simcoe County Rovers FC	Pickering FC	St. Catharines Roma Wolves	Guelph United FC

== Clubs ==
=== Current clubs ===
Currently there are 26 clubs, based mainly in the Greater Toronto Area and other cities in Southern Ontario. There is one club based in Northern Ontario, Sudbury Cyclones.

==== Ontario Premier League 1 ====
Ontario Premier League 1
Team	City	Principal stadium	First season
FC London	London	Tricar Field	2016
Guelph United FC	Guelph	Centennial Bowl	2021
AFC Toronto Academy	Vaughan	Ontario Soccer Centre	2022
North Mississauga SC	Mississauga	Churchill Meadows (Mattamy Sports Park)	2015
North Toronto Nitros	North York (Toronto)	Downsview Park	2020
Scrosoppi FC	Milton	St. Francis Xavier CSS	2024
Simcoe County Rovers FC	Barrie	J.C. Massie Field	2022
Vaughan Azzurri	Vaughan	North Maple Field	2015
Waterloo United	Waterloo	RIM Park	2021
Woodbridge Strikers	Woodbridge (Vaughan)	Vaughan Grove Field	2015

==== Ontario Premier League 2 ====
Ontario Premier League 2
Team	City	Principal stadium	First season
Burlington SC	Burlington	Corpus Christi CSS	2022
Cambridge United	Cambridge	Fountain Street Soccer Complex	2025
Hamilton United	Hamilton	Ron Joyce Stadium (McMaster University)	2018
International FC	Thornhill (Vaughan)	Zanchin Automotive Soccer Centre	2026 (Note: Acquired licence from Alliance United FC)
Oakville SC (Note: Merged with Blue Devils FC in 2024, absorbing that organization under the Oakville SC name.)	Oakville	Bronte Athletic Park	2018/2025 (Note: 2018 as Blue Devils FC, 2025 as Oakville SC)
Pickering FC	Pickering	Pickering Soccer Centre/Kinsmen Park	2015
Rush Canada	Oakville	River Oaks Park	2024
Tecumseh United FC	Tecumseh	Académie Ste. Cécile International School	2021
Unionville Milliken SC	Unionville (Markham)	Ontario Soccer Centre	2017
Whitby FC (Note: Known as Darby FC until the 2025 season.)	Whitby	Telus Dome	2016

==== Ontario Premier League 3 ====
In 2024, a third tier was introduced featuring new clubs as well as reserve teams. It currently consists of 25 teams, 6 independent and 29 reserve, split into three conferences and eligible to earn promotion to the higher tiers.

Ontario Premier League 3
Team	City	Principal stadium	First season
Northeast Division
International FC B	Vaughan	Dufferin Community Centre	Reserve team
Kingston Sentinels	Kingston	CaraCo Home Field	2026
Master's FA	Scarborough (Toronto)	L'Amoreaux Park	2021 (Note: Master's FA has not been announced as a L1O license holder for the women's division, but have operated a Reserve team since the 2021 season)
North Toronto Nitros B	North York (Toronto)		Reserve team
Pickering FC B	Pickering		Reserve team
Simcoe County Rovers FC B	Barrie		Reserve team
Unionville Milliken SC B	Unionville (Markham)	Bill Crothers Turf West	Reserve team
Whitby FC B	Whitby	Telus Dome	Reserve team
Central Division
Burlington SC B	Burlington	City View Park Centre	Reserve team
North Mississauga SC B	Mississauga	Mattamy Sports Park	Reserve team
Oakville SC B	Oakville	Sheridan Trafalgar Stadium	Reserve team
Richmond Hill SC	Richmond Hill	Richmond Green Park	2026
Rush Canada SA B	Oakville	River Oaks Park	Reserve team
Scrosoppi FC B	Milton	St. Francis Xavier CSS	Reserve team
Sudbury Cyclones	Sudbury	James Jerome Sports Complex	2025
Vaughan Azzurri B	Vaughan	North Maple Regional Park	Reserve team
Woodbridge Strikers B	Vaughan	Vaughan Grove Park	Reserve team
Southwest Division
Cambridge United B	Cambridge	Fountain Street Soccer Field	Reserve team
FC London B	London	City Wide Sports Park	Reserve team
Guelph United FC B	Guelph		Reserve team
Hamilton United B	Hamilton		Reserve team
Railway City FC	St. Thomas	1Password Park	2025
St. Catharines Roma Wolves	St. Catharines	Brock University	2022
Tecumseh United FC B	Tecumseh	University of Windsor Stadium	Reserve team
Waterloo United B	Waterloo		Reserve team

Location of Women's Division teams for the 2021 League1 Ontario season.
Current team
Club on hiatus
See Toronto insert
Location of teams in or near Toronto for the 2021 League1 Ontario season.
Current team

=== Former clubs ===
Former teams
Team	City	Stadium	First season	Final season
Alliance United FC	Markham/Scarborough	Varsity Stadium	2019	2025
ANB Futbol	King	The Country Day School	2015	
Aurora FC	Aurora	Stewart Burnett Park	2016	2020
DeRo United Futbol Academy	Scarborough (Toronto)	L'Amoreaux Park	2018	2019
Electric City FC	Peterborough	Fleming College	2022	2023
FC Oshawa	Oshawa	Civic Stadium	2019	
Kingston Clippers	Kingston	Tindall Field, Queen's University	2016	
Ottawa South United	Manotick (Ottawa)	Quinn's Pointe	2019	
ProStars FC	Brampton		2015	2024
Sanjaxx Lions	Toronto	Monarch Park Stadium	2015	2017
Toronto Azzurri Blizzard	Toronto	Azzurri Village	2017	2018
West Ottawa SC	Kanata (Ottawa)	Wesley Clover Park	2017	2018

== Players who earned national team caps while in OPL ==
The following players have earned a senior national team cap while playing in Ontario Premier League (the year of their first cap while playing in the league is listed). Players who earned caps before or after playing in OPL are not included, unless they also earned caps while in the league. This section also does not include youth caps (U23 or below).

Player	Country	Year	Ref
Kayla Desouza	Guyana	2015	
Briana DeSouza	Guyana	2015	
Ashlee Savona	Guyana	2015	
Kira Bertrand	Dominica	2015	
Farkhunda Muhtaj	Afghanistan	2016	
Ashley Lawrence	Canada	2016	
Kadeisha Buchanan	Canada	2016	
Calaigh Copland	Guyana	2016	
Bria Williams	Guyana	2016	
Sarah Stratigakis	Canada	2017	
Alex Lamontagne	Canada	2017	
Kylee Bertrand	Dominica	2018	
Cloey Uddenberg	Saint Kitts and Nevis	2018	
Brianne Desa	Guyana	2018	
Rylee Traicoff	Guyana	2018	
Julia Gonsalves	Guyana	2018	
Jade Vyfhuis	Guyana	2018	
Alicia Zaban	Guyana	2018	
Nicole Kozlova	Ukraine	2019	
Markela Bejleri	Albania	2020	
Gabriella Salvadore	Guyana	2021	
Serena McDonald	Guyana	2021	
Yoana Peralta	Dominican Republic	2021	
Kyra Dickinson	Saint Kitts and Nevis	2022	
Justine Rodrigues	Guyana	2022	
Courtney Douglas	Jamaica	2022	
Savannah Singh	Guyana	2023	
Hope Windebank	Guyana	2024	
Alexis Bayley	Guyana	2026	

== See also ==
- Canadian soccer league system
- Ontario Premier League
- United Women's Soccer
