= 2018 in American soccer =

Soccer in the United States
- Season: 2018

Men's soccer
- Supporters' Shield: New York Red Bulls
- USL: Louisville City FC
- NPSL: Miami FC 2
- PDL: (Canada) Calgary Foothills FC
- US Open Cup: Houston Dynamo
- MLS Cup: Atlanta United FC

Women's soccer
- NWSL: North Carolina Courage
- WPSL: Seattle Sounders Women
- UWS: Houston Aces

The 2018 season was the 106th season of competitive soccer in the United States.

== National teams ==
=== Men's ===
==== Senior ====
Wins	Losses	Draws
3	5	3

===== Results and fixtures =====
====== Friendlies ======
January 28	United States	0–0	Bosnia and Herzegovina	Carson, California
21:30 ET		Report		Stadium: StubHub Center; Attendance: 11,161; Referee: Hector Martinez (Honduras)

March 27	United States	1–0	Paraguay	Cary, North Carolina
19:30 ET	Wood 45' (pen.)	Report		Stadium: WakeMed Soccer Park; Attendance: 9,825; Referee: Kimbell Ward (St. Kitts and Nevis)

May 28	United States	3–0	Bolivia	Chester, Pennsylvania
18:30 ET	Zimmerman 37'; Sargent 52'; Weah 59'	Report		Stadium: Talen Energy Stadium; Attendance: 11,882; Referee: Oshane Nation (Jamaica)

June 2	Republic of Ireland	2–1	United States	Dublin, Republic of Ireland
14:45 ET	Burke 57'; Judge 90'	Report	Wood 45+1'	Stadium: Aviva Stadium; Attendance: 32,300; Referee: Andrew Dallas (Scotland)

June 9	France	1–1	United States	Lyon, France
15:00 ET	Mbappé 74'	Report	Green 44'	Stadium: Groupama Stadium; Attendance: 58,241; Referee: William Collum (Scotland)

September 7	United States	0–2	Brazil	East Rutherford, New Jersey
19:30 ET		Report	Firmino 11'; Neymar 43' (pen.)	Stadium: MetLife Stadium; Attendance: 32,489; Referee: Fernando Guerrero (Mexico)

September 11	United States	1–0	Mexico	Nashville, Tennessee
20:30 ET	Miazga (yellow card) 38'; Adams 71' (Robinson); Yedlin (yellow card) 88'; Wood (yellow card) 89'	Report	Álvarez (yellow card) 66'; Zaldívar (red card) 67'	Stadium: Nissan Stadium; Attendance: 40,194; Referee: Ricardo Montero (Costa Rica)

October 11	United States	2–4	Colombia	Tampa, Florida
19:30 ET	Acosta 50'; Wood 53'	Report	Rodríguez 36'; Bacca 56'; Falcao 74'; Borja 79'	Stadium: Raymond James Stadium; Attendance: 38,631; Referee: John Pitti (Panama)

October 16	United States	1–1	Peru	East Hartford, Connecticut
19:30 ET	Sargent 49'	Report	Flores 86'	Stadium: Pratt & Whitney Stadium at Rentschler Field; Attendance: 24,959; Referee: Ivan Barton (El Salvador)

November 15	England	3–0	United States	London, England
15:00 ET	Lingard 26'; Alexander-Arnold 27'; Wilson 77'	Report		Stadium: Wembley Stadium; Attendance: 68,155; Referee: Jesús Gil Manzano (Spain)

November 20	United States	0–1	Italy	Genk, Belgium
14:45 ET		Report	Politano 90+4'	Stadium: Luminus Arena; Attendance: 13,500; Referee: Cüneyt Çakır (Turkey)

===== Goalscorers =====
Goals are current as of November 20, 2018, after match against Italy.

Player	Goals
Bobby Wood	3
Josh Sargent	2
Walker Zimmerman	1
Timothy Weah	1
Julian Green	1
Tyler Adams	1
Kellyn Acosta	1

===== Managerial changes =====
This is a list of changes of managers:

Team	Outgoing manager	Manner of departure	Date of departure	Incoming manager	Date of appointment
United States	(United States) Dave Sarachan (caretaker)	End of interim role	December 2	(United States) Gregg Berhalter	December 2

==== U-20 ====
===== 2018 CONCACAF U-20 Championship =====
====== Group A ======
Pos	Team	Pld	W	D	L	GF	GA	GD	Pts	Qualification
1	United States (H)	5	5	0	0	39	2	+37	15	Qualification stage
2	Suriname	5	3	0	2	18	12	+6	9	
3	Puerto Rico	5	3	0	2	16	15	+1	9	
4	Trinidad and Tobago	5	3	0	2	12	11	+1	9	
5	Saint Vincent and the Grenadines	5	1	0	4	8	15	−7	3	
6	U.S. Virgin Islands	5	0	0	5	2	40	−38	0	

Source: CONCACAF
Rules for classification: Group stage tiebreakers
(H) Hosts

November 1 Group A	United States	7–1	Puerto Rico	Bradenton, Florida
17:30 ET	Rennicks 5', 57' (pen.); Méndez 11'; Pomykal 27'; Akinola 49', 69'; Llanez 86'	Report	Cosme 33'	Stadium: IMG Academy; Referee: Hector Said Martínez (Honduras)

November 3 Group A	U.S. Virgin Islands	0–13	United States	Bradenton, Florida
19:45 ET		Report	Dorsey 4'; Akinola 20'; Llanez 23', 30', 40'; Fontana 42'; Rennicks 62', 66'; McKenzie 63', 82'; Pomykal 68'; Méndez 80' (pen.); Perez 90+2'	Stadium: IMG Academy; Attendance: 620; Referee: Keylor Herrera (Costa Rica)

November 5 Group A	United States	6–1	Trinidad and Tobago	Bradenton, Florida
19:45 ET	Servania 6'; Francis 8' (o.g.); Pomykal 45'; Méndez 52'; Llanez 56'; Torres 90+3'	Report	Lee 54'	Stadium: IMG Academy; Attendance: 1,100; Referee: Juan Calderón Pérez (Costa Rica)

November 7 Group A	Saint Vincent and the Grenadines	0–6	United States	Bradenton, Florida
19:45 ET			Torres 46'; Llanez 59'; Fontana 66', 81', 86'; Servania 90'	Stadium: IMG Academy; Referee: Pierre-Luc Lauzière (Canada)

November 9 Group A	United States	7–0	Suriname	Bradenton, Florida
17:30 ET	Méndez 7', 83' (pen.); McKenzie 26'; Akinola 43', 45+1'; Torres 62'; Rennicks 79'	Report		Stadium: IMG Academy; Referee: Ismael Cornejo Meléndez (El Salvador)

====== Qualification stage ======
The top two teams of each group in the qualification stage qualify for the 2019 FIFA U-20 World Cup, with the winners of each group also advancing to the final to decide the champions of the CONCACAF U-20 Championship.

Group G

Pos	Team	Pld	W	D	L	GF	GA	GD	Pts	Qualification
1	United States (H)	2	2	0	0	5	0	+5	6	Final and 2019 FIFA U-20 World Cup
2	Honduras	2	0	1	1	1	2	−1	1	2019 FIFA U-20 World Cup
3	Costa Rica	2	0	1	1	1	5	−4	1	

Source: CONCACAF
Rules for classification: Qualification stage tiebreakers
(H) Hosts

November 16 Group G	United States	4–0	Costa Rica	Bradenton, Florida
19:30 ET	Méndez 15'; Llanez 19'; Torres 49'; Akinola 76'	Report		Stadium: IMG Academy; Attendance: 1,450; Referee: Oshane Nation (Jamaica)

November 19 Group G	Honduras	0–1	United States	Bradenton, Florida
19:30 ET		Report	Akinola 51'	Stadium: IMG Academy; Attendance: 2,100; Referee: Fernando Hernández Gómez (Mexico)

November 21 Final	United States	2–0	Mexico	Bradenton, Florida
19:00 ET	Méndez 17', 50'			Stadium: IMG Academy; Referee: Iván Barton Cisneros (El Salvador)

=== Women's ===
==== Senior ====
Wins	Losses	Draws
18	0	2

===== Friendlies =====
January 21	United States	5–1	Denmark	San Diego, California
19:30 ET	Morgan 17'; Ertz 19'; Pugh 47', 65'; Dunn 81'	Report	Nadim 14'	Stadium: SDCCU Stadium; Attendance: 17,526; Referee: Karen Abt (United States)

April 5	United States	4–1	Mexico	Jacksonville, Florida
19:00 ET	Pugh 6'; Morgan 51' (pen.), 53'; Lloyd 54'	Report	Johnson 64'	Stadium: EverBank Field; Attendance: 14,360; Referee: Cardella Samuels (Jamaica)

April 8	United States	6–2	Mexico	Houston, Texas
13:30 ET	Pugh 3'; Horan 25'; Lloyd 34'; Morgan 44', 68'; Rapinoe 64'	Report	Ocampo 17'; Palacios 24'	Stadium: BBVA Compass Stadium; Attendance: 15,349; Referee: Karen Abt (United States)

June 7	United States	1–0	China	Sandy, Utah
21:00 ET	Morgan 57'	Report		Stadium: Rio Tinto Stadium; Attendance: 13,230; Referee: Lucila Venegas (Mexico)

June 12	United States	2–1	China	Cleveland, Ohio
19:00 ET	Rapinoe 35'; Heath 75'	Report	Li 72'	Stadium: FirstEnergy Stadium; Attendance: 12,335; Referee: Christina Unkel (United States)

August 31	United States	3–0	Chile	Carson, California
23:00 ET	Davidson 8'; Guerrero 32' (o.g.); Press 59'	Report		Stadium: StubHub Center; Attendance: 23,544; Referee: Ekaterina Koroleva (United States)

September 4	United States	4–0	Chile	San Jose, California
22:00 ET	Pugh 34'; Heath 38'; Lloyd 47', 90+3'	Report		Stadium: Avaya Stadium; Attendance: 14,340; Referee: Christina Unkel (United States) (First Half); Karen Abt (United States) (Second Half)

November 8	Portugal	0–1	United States	Estoril, Portugal
13:00 ET		Report	McDonald 42'	Stadium: Estádio António Coimbra da Mota; Referee: Rebecca Welch (England)

November 13	Scotland	0–1	United States	Paisley, Scotland
14:00 ET		Report	Morgan 39'	Stadium: St Mirren Park; Attendance: 3,790; Referee: Amy Fearn (England)

===== 2018 SheBelieves Cup =====
Pos	Team	Pld	W	D	L	GF	GA	GD	Pts
1st place, gold medalist(s)	United States (H, C)	3	2	1	0	3	1	+2	7
2nd place, silver medalist(s)	England	3	1	1	1	6	4	+2	4
3rd place, bronze medalist(s)	France	3	1	1	1	5	5	0	4
4	Germany	3	0	1	2	2	6	−4	1

Source: USSoccer
Rules for classification: 1) points; 2) goal difference; 3) goals scored; 4) head-to-head points; 5) head-to-head goal difference; 6) head-to-head number of goals scored; 7) FIFA ranking.
(C) Champions; (H) Hosts

March 1	United States	1–0	Germany	Columbus, Ohio
19:00 ET	Rapinoe 17'	Report		Stadium: Mapfre Stadium; Attendance: 14,591; Referee: Melissa Borjas (Honduras)

March 4	United States	1–1	France	Harrison, New Jersey
12:00 ET	Pugh 35'	Report	Le Sommer 38'	Stadium: Red Bull Arena; Attendance: 25,706; Referee: Lucila Venegas (Mexico)

March 7	United States	1–0	England	Orlando, Florida
19:00 ET	Bardsley 58' (o.g.)	Report		Stadium: Orlando City Stadium; Attendance: 12,351; Referee: Carol Anne Chenard (Canada)

===== 2018 Tournament of Nations =====
Pos	Team	Pld	W	D	L	GF	GA	GD	Pts
1	United States (C, H)	3	2	1	0	9	4	+5	7
2	Australia	3	2	1	0	6	2	+4	7
3	Brazil	3	1	0	2	4	8	−4	3
4	Japan	3	0	0	3	3	8	−5	0

Rules for classification: 1) Points; 2) Goal difference; 3) Goals scored; 4) Head-to-head; 5) FIFA Ranking
(C) Champions; (H) Hosts

July 26	United States	4–2	Japan	Kansas City, Kansas
19:00 ET	Morgan 18', 26', 56'; Rapinoe 66'	Report	Tanaka 20'; Sakaguchi 76'	Stadium: Children's Mercy Park; Attendance: 18,467; Referee: Carol-Ann Chenard (Canada)

July 29	United States	1–1	Australia	East Hartford, Connecticut
19:00 ET	Horan 90'	Report	Logarzo 22'	Stadium: Pratt & Whitney Stadium at Rentschler Field; Attendance: 21,570; Referee: Miriam León (El Salvador)

August 2	United States	4–1	Brazil	Bridgeview, Illinois
20:30 ET	Lavelle 32'; Ertz 52'; Heath 60'; Morgan 76'	Report	Davidson 15' (o.g.)	Stadium: Toyota Park; Attendance: 18,309; Referee: Quetzalli Alvarado (Mexico)

===== 2018 CONCACAF Women's Championship =====
====== Group A ======
Pos	Team	Pld	W	D	L	GF	GA	GD	Pts	Qualification
1	United States (H)	3	3	0	0	18	0	+18	9	Knockout stage
2	Panama	3	2	0	1	5	5	0	6	Knockout stage
3	Mexico	3	1	0	2	4	9	−5	3	
4	Trinidad and Tobago	3	0	0	3	1	14	−13	0	

Source: CONCACAF
Rules for classification: Group stage tiebreakers
(H) Hosts

October 4	United States	6–0	Mexico	Cary, North Carolina
19:30 ET	Rapinoe 3', 70'; Ertz 47'; Morgan 57', 80'; Heath 61'	Report		Stadium: Sahlen's Stadium; Attendance: 5,404; Referee: Carol Anne Chenard (Canada)

October 7	Panama	0–5	United States	Cary, North Carolina
19:30 ET		Report	Mewis 5'; Lloyd 23', 29', 48'; Press 32'	Stadium: Sahlen's Stadium; Attendance: 7,532; Referee: Tatiana Guzmán (Nicaragua)

October 10	Trinidad and Tobago	0–7	United States	Cary, North Carolina
19:30 ET		Report	Morgan 9', 50'; Lavelle 41', 43'; Dunn 45'; Horan 49'; Heath 58'	Stadium: Sahlen's Stadium; Attendance: 3,996; Referee: Odette Hamilton (Jamaica)

====== Semi-final ======
October 14	United States	6–0	Jamaica	Frisco, Texas
20:00 ET	Heath 2', 29'; Rapinoe 15'; Ertz 21'; Morgan 33', 84' (pen.)	Report		Stadium: Toyota Stadium; Attendance: 7,555; Referee: Francia González (Mexico)

====== Final ======
October 17	Canada	0–2	United States	Frisco, Texas
20:00 ET		Report	Lavelle 3'; Morgan 89'	Stadium: Toyota Stadium; Attendance: 6,986; Referee: Lucila Venegas (Mexico)

===== Goalscorers =====
Goals are current as of November 13, 2018, after match against Scotland.

Player	Goals
Alex Morgan	18
Carli Lloyd	8
Megan Rapinoe	7
Mallory Pugh	6
Tobin Heath	6
Julie Ertz	4
Rose Lavelle	4
Lindsey Horan	3
Christen Press	2
Crystal Dunn	2
Tierna Davidson	1
Sam Mewis	1
Jessica McDonald	1
own goal	2

==== U-20 ====
===== 2018 CONCACAF Women's U-20 Championship =====
====== Group B ======
Pos	Team	Pld	W	D	L	GF	GA	GD	Pts	Qualification
1	United States	3	3	0	0	6	2	+4	9	Knockout stage
2	Mexico	3	2	0	1	7	2	+5	6	Knockout stage
3	Nicaragua	3	0	1	2	2	6	−4	1	
4	Jamaica	3	0	1	2	3	8	−5	1	

Source: CONCACAF
Rules for classification: Group stage tiebreakers

January 19	United States	2–0	Nicaragua	Couva, Trinidad and Tobago
17:30 ET	Torres 17'; Kuhlmann 53'	Report		Stadium: Ato Boldon Stadium; Attendance: 125; Referee: Crystal Sobers (Trinidad and Tobago)

January 21	Jamaica	1–2	United States	Couva, Trinidad and Tobago
18:30 ET	Matthews 88'	Report	Smith 42'; Howell 89'	Stadium: Ato Boldon Stadium; Attendance: 245; Referee: Carol Anne Chenard (Canada)

January 23	United States	2–1	Mexico	Couva, Trinidad and Tobago
15:00 ET	Kim 30'; Sanchez 39'	Report	Martinez 75'	Stadium: Ato Boldon Stadium; Attendance: 112; Referee: Tatiana Guzmán Alguera (Nicaragua)

====== Semi-finals ======
January 26	United States	1–1 (3-0 p)	Haiti	Couva, Trinidad and Tobago
15:00 ET	Howell 76'	Report	Mondésir 90+2'	Stadium: Ato Boldon Stadium; Referee: Melissa Borjas (Honduras)
	Penalties
	Smith (penalty missed); Torres (penalty scored); Howell (penalty scored); Morse (penalty scored)		(penalty missed) Mondésir; (penalty missed) Dumonay; (penalty missed) Eloissaint

====== Final ======
January 28	United States	1–1 (a.e.t.) (2-4 p)	Mexico	Couva, Trinidad and Tobago
17:00 ET		Report		Stadium: Ato Boldon Stadium; Attendance: 275; Referee: Carol-Anne Chenard (Canada)

===== 2018 FIFA U-20 Women's World Cup =====
====== Group C ======
Pos	Team	Pld	W	D	L	GF	GA	GD	Pts	Qualification
1	Spain	3	2	1	0	7	3	+4	7	Knockout stage
2	Japan	3	2	0	1	7	1	+6	6	Knockout stage
3	United States	3	1	1	1	8	3	+5	4	
4	Paraguay	3	0	0	3	1	16	−15	0	

Source: FIFA
Rules for classification: Group stage tiebreakers

August 6	United States	0–1	Japan	Concarneau, France
13:30 ET		Report	Hayashi 76'	Stadium: Stade Guy Piriou; Attendance: 2,332; Referee: Gladys Lengwe (Zambia)

August 9	United States	6–0	Paraguay	Concarneau, France
13:30 ET	Smith 15', 63'; DeMelo 39', 44', 78'; Sanchez 46'	Report		Stadium: Stade Guy Piriou; Attendance: 2,117; Referee: Qin Liang (China PR)

August 13	Spain	2–2	United States	Dinan-Léhon, France
07:30 ET	Guijarro 7'; García 42'	Report	Smith 83'; DeMelo 87'	Stadium: Stade du Clos Gastel; Attendance: 1,681; Referee: Anna-Marie Keighley (New Zealand)

==== U-17 ====
===== 2018 CONCACAF Women's U-17 Championship =====
On 22 April 2018, four days into the tournament, CONCACAF announced the remainder of the championship was cancelled immediately due to security concerns caused by civil unrest in Nicaragua. On 11 May 2018, CONCACAF announced the tournament would resume play on 6 June and conclude on 12 June 2018, with the remainder of the tournament hosted at the IMG Academy in Bradenton, Florida, United States. Six teams will play in the remainder of the tournament, as Nicaragua and Puerto Rico were already eliminated and were set to face each other in their last match.

====== Group B ======
Pos	Team	Pld	W	D	L	GF	GA	GD	Pts	Qualification
1	United States (H)	3	3	0	0	15	1	+14	9	Knockout stage
2	Canada	3	2	0	1	5	2	+3	6	Knockout stage
3	Costa Rica	3	1	0	2	7	7	0	3	
4	Bermuda	3	0	0	3	2	19	−17	0	

Source: CONCACAF
Rules for classification: Group stage tiebreakers
(H) Hosts

April 20	United States	4–0	Costa Rica	Managua, Nicaragua
22:00 ET	Umaña 4' (o.g.); Linnehan 15'; Wesley 60'; Jones 79'	Report		Stadium: Nicaragua National Football Stadium; Attendance: 160; Referee: Odette Hamilton (Jamaica)

June 6	United States	10–1	Bermuda	Bradenton, Florida
17:00 ET	Fishel 6'; Ordoñez 25'; Doms 32', 48'; Turner 41'; Kroeger 44'; Morris 47'; Wheeler 85'; Fontes 86', 90'	Report	Nesbeth 17'	Stadium: IMG Academy; Attendance: 480; Referee: Ronide Henrius (Haiti)

June 8	United States	1–0	Canada	Bradenton, Florida
17:00 ET	Turner 65'			Stadium: IMG Academy; Attendance: 380; Referee: Miriam León (El Salvador)

====== Semi-finals ======
June 10	Haiti	2–3	United States	Bradenton, Florida
17:00 ET	Dumornay 14', 90+3'	Report	Fontes 32', 50'; Fishel 50'	Stadium: IMG Academy; Attendance: 377; Referee: Marienela Araya (Costa Rica)

====== Finals ======
June 12	Mexico	2–3	United States	Bradenton, Florida
16:30 ET				Stadium: IMG Academy; Referee: Melissa Borjas (Honduras)

===== 2018 FIFA U-17 Women's World Cup =====
====== Group C ======
Pos	Team	Pld	W	D	L	GF	GA	GD	Pts	Qualification
1	Germany	3	2	0	1	8	2	+6	6	Knockout stage
2	North Korea	3	2	0	1	6	5	+1	6	Knockout stage
3	Cameroon	3	1	0	2	2	5	−3	3	
4	United States	3	1	0	2	3	7	−4	3	

Source: FIFA
Rules for classification: Group stage tiebreakers

November 14	United States	3–0	Cameroon	Colonia del Sacramento, Uruguay
13:00 ET	Fishel 22'; Fontes 45+5' (pen.), 81'	Report		Stadium: Estadio Profesor Alberto Suppici; Attendance: 593; Referee: Casey Reibelt (Australia)

November 17	United States	0–3	North Korea	Colonia del Sacramento, Uruguay
15:00 ET		Report	Ri Kum-hyang 25'; Kim Yun-ok 32'; Kim Kyong-yong 52'	Stadium: Estadio Profesor Alberto Suppici; Attendance: 573; Referee: Katalin Kulcsár (Hungary)

November 21	Germany	4–0	United States	Montevideo, Uruguay
16:00 ET	Fudalla 4'; Martinez 32', 65'; Donhauser 89'	Report		Stadium: Estadio Charrúa; Attendance: 518; Referee: Laura Fortunato (Argentina)

== Club Competitions ==
=== Men's ===
==== League Competitions ====
===== Major League Soccer =====
====== Conference tables ======
Eastern Conference

Pos	Team	Pld	W	L	T	GF	GA	GD	Pts	Qualification
1	New York Red Bulls	34	22	7	5	62	33	+29	71	MLS Cup Conference Semifinals
2	Atlanta United FC	34	21	7	6	70	44	+26	69	MLS Cup Conference Semifinals
3	New York City FC	34	16	10	8	59	45	+14	56	MLS Cup Knockout Round
4	D.C. United	34	14	11	9	60	50	+10	51	MLS Cup Knockout Round
5	Columbus Crew	34	14	11	9	43	45	−2	51	MLS Cup Knockout Round
6	Philadelphia Union	34	15	14	5	49	50	−1	50	MLS Cup Knockout Round
7	Montreal Impact	34	14	16	4	47	53	−6	46	
8	New England Revolution	34	10	13	11	49	55	−6	41	
9	Toronto FC	34	10	18	6	59	64	−5	36	
10	Chicago Fire	34	8	18	8	48	61	−13	32	
11	Orlando City SC	34	8	22	4	43	74	−31	28	

Source: MLS

Western Conference

Pos	Team	Pld	W	L	T	GF	GA	GD	Pts	Qualification
1	Sporting Kansas City	34	18	8	8	65	40	+25	62	MLS Cup Conference Semifinals
2	Seattle Sounders FC	34	18	11	5	52	37	+15	59	MLS Cup Conference Semifinals
3	Los Angeles FC	34	16	9	9	68	52	+16	57	MLS Cup Knockout Round
4	FC Dallas	34	16	9	9	52	44	+8	57	MLS Cup Knockout Round
5	Portland Timbers	34	15	10	9	54	48	+6	54	MLS Cup Knockout Round
6	Real Salt Lake	34	14	13	7	55	58	−3	49	MLS Cup Knockout Round
7	LA Galaxy	34	13	12	9	66	64	+2	48	
8	Vancouver Whitecaps FC	34	13	13	8	54	67	−13	47	
9	Houston Dynamo	34	10	16	8	58	58	0	38	
10	Minnesota United FC	34	11	20	3	49	71	−22	36	
11	Colorado Rapids	34	8	19	7	36	63	−27	31	
12	San Jose Earthquakes	34	4	21	9	49	71	−22	21	

Source: MLS

====== 2018 table ======
Note: the table below has no impact on playoff qualification and is used solely for determining host of the MLS Cup, certain CCL spots, the Supporters' Shield trophy, seeding in the 2019 Canadian Championship, and 2019 MLS draft. The conference tables are the sole determinant for teams qualifying for the playoffs.

Pos	Team	Pld	W	L	T	GF	GA	GD	Pts	Qualification
1	New York Red Bulls (S)	34	22	7	5	62	33	+29	71	CONCACAF Champions League
2	Atlanta United FC (C)	34	21	7	6	70	44	+26	69	CONCACAF Champions League
3	Sporting Kansas City	34	18	8	8	65	40	+25	62	CONCACAF Champions League
4	Seattle Sounders FC	34	18	11	5	52	37	+15	59	
5	Los Angeles FC	34	16	9	9	68	52	+16	57	
6	FC Dallas	34	16	9	9	52	44	+8	57	
7	New York City FC	34	16	10	8	59	45	+14	56	
8	Portland Timbers	34	15	10	9	54	48	+6	54	
9	D.C. United	34	14	11	9	60	50	+10	51	
10	Columbus Crew	34	14	11	9	43	45	−2	51	
11	Philadelphia Union	34	15	14	5	49	50	−1	50	
12	Real Salt Lake	34	14	13	7	55	58	−3	49	
13	LA Galaxy	34	13	12	9	66	64	+2	48	
14	Vancouver Whitecaps FC	34	13	13	8	54	67	−13	47	
15	Montreal Impact	34	14	16	4	47	53	−6	46	
16	New England Revolution	34	10	13	11	49	55	−6	41	
17	Houston Dynamo	34	10	16	8	58	58	0	38	CONCACAF Champions League
18	Minnesota United FC	34	11	20	3	49	71	−22	36	
19	Toronto FC	34	10	18	6	59	64	−5	36	CONCACAF Champions League
20	Chicago Fire	34	8	18	8	48	61	−13	32	
21	Colorado Rapids	34	8	19	7	36	63	−27	31	
22	Orlando City SC	34	8	22	4	43	74	−31	28	
23	San Jose Earthquakes	34	4	21	9	49	71	−22	21	

Source: MLS
Rules for classification: 1) points; 2) total wins; 3) total goal differential; 4) total goals scored; 5) disciplinary points; 6) away goals scored; 7) away goal differential; 8) coin toss or drawing of lots
(C) MLS Cup Champion; (S) Supporters' Shield

====== Aggregate 2017 and 2018 table ======
As Toronto FC won MLS Cup 2017, one of the U.S. berths for the 2019 CONCACAF Champions League had to be reallocated, to the U.S. non-champions with the best aggregate record over the 2017 and 2018 MLS regular seasons. As the top ranked team in the table, Atlanta United FC, also qualified for the Champions League by winning MLS Cup 2018, the Champions League spot via the aggregate table was instead awarded to the second-placed team, the New York Red Bulls.

Note: Only U.S. teams are listed in this table.

Pos	Team	Pld	W	L	T	GF	GA	GD	Pts	Qualification
1	Atlanta United FC	68	36	16	16	140	84	+56	124	2019 CONCACAF Champions League (Note: As MLS Cup 2018 champions (USA1))
2	New York Red Bulls	68	36	19	13	115	80	+35	121	2019 CONCACAF Champions League (Note: As best aggregate 2017 and 2018 record (USA4))
3	New York City FC	68	32	19	17	115	88	+27	113	
4	Seattle Sounders FC	68	32	20	16	104	76	+28	112	
5	Sporting Kansas City	68	30	17	21	105	69	+36	111	2019 CONCACAF Champions League (Note: As 2017 U.S. Open Cup champions (USA2))
6	Portland Timbers	68	30	21	17	114	98	+16	107	
7	Columbus Crew	68	30	23	15	96	94	+2	105	
8	FC Dallas	68	27	19	22	100	92	+8	103	
9	Real Salt Lake	68	27	28	13	104	113	−9	94	
10	Philadelphia Union	68	26	28	14	99	97	+2	92	
11	Houston Dynamo	68	23	26	19	115	103	+12	88	2019 CONCACAF Champions League (Note: As 2018 U.S. Open Cup champions (USA3))
12	Chicago Fire	68	24	29	15	106	105	+1	87	
13	New England Revolution	68	23	28	17	102	116	−14	86	
14	D.C. United	68	23	31	14	91	110	−19	83	
15	LA Galaxy	68	21	30	17	111	131	−20	80	
16	Minnesota United	68	21	38	9	97	141	−44	72	
17	Orlando City	68	18	37	13	82	132	−50	67	
18	San Jose Earthquakes	68	17	35	16	84	126	−42	67	
19	Colorado Rapids	68	17	38	13	67	114	−47	64	
20	Los Angeles FC	34	16	9	9	68	52	+16	57	

Source: MLS
Rules for classification: 1) points; 2) total wins; 3) total goal differential; 4) total goals scored; 5) disciplinary points; 6) away goals scored; 7) away goal differential; 8) coin toss or drawing of lots

====== MLS Playoffs ======
Knockout round	Conference semifinals
E3	New York City FC	0	1	1
10/31 – New York, New York
E2	**Atlanta United FC**	1	3	**4**
E3	**New York City FC**	**3**
E6	Philadelphia Union	1
Eastern Conference
E5	Columbus Crew	1	0	1
11/1 – Washington, D.C.
E1	**New York Red Bulls**	0	3	**3**
E4	D.C. United	2 (2)
E5	**Columbus Crew (p)**	**2 (3)**
W5	**Portland Timbers (p)**	2	2	**4 (4)**
10/31 – Frisco, Texas
W2	Seattle Sounders FC	1	3	4 (2)
W4	FC Dallas	1
W5	**Portland Timbers**	**2**
Western Conference
W6	Real Salt Lake	1	2	3
11/1 – Los Angeles, California
W1	**Sporting Kansas City**	1	4	**5**
W3	Los Angeles FC	2
W6	**Real Salt Lake**	**3**

Conference finals
E2	**Atlanta United FC**	3	0	**3**
E1	New York Red Bulls	0	1	1
W5	**Portland Timbers**	0	3	**3**
W1	Sporting Kansas City	0	2	2

MLS Cup; December 8 – Atlanta, Georgia
**E2**	**Atlanta United FC**	**2**
W5	Portland Timbers	0

====== MLS Cup ======
December 8, 2018
8:00 p.m. EST

Atlanta United FC	2–0	Portland Timbers
Martínez 39'; Escobar 54'	Report

Mercedes-Benz Stadium, Atlanta, Georgia
Attendance: 73,019
Referee: Alan Kelly

===== USL =====
====== Conference tables ======
Eastern Conference

Pos	Team	Pld	W	D	L	GF	GA	GD	Pts	Qualification
1	FC Cincinnati (X)	34	23	8	3	72	34	+38	77	Conference Playoffs
2	Louisville City FC (C)	34	19	9	6	71	38	+33	66	Conference Playoffs
3	Pittsburgh Riverhounds SC	34	15	14	5	47	26	+21	59	Conference Playoffs
4	Charleston Battery	34	14	14	6	47	34	+13	56	Conference Playoffs
5	New York Red Bulls II	34	13	13	8	71	59	+12	52	Conference Playoffs
6	Bethlehem Steel FC	34	14	8	12	56	41	+15	50	Conference Playoffs
7	Indy Eleven	34	13	10	11	45	42	+3	49	Conference Playoffs
8	Nashville SC	34	12	13	9	42	31	+11	49	Conference Playoffs
9	North Carolina FC	34	13	8	13	60	50	+10	47	
10	Ottawa Fury	34	13	6	15	31	43	−12	45	
11	Charlotte Independence	34	10	12	12	44	57	−13	42	
12	Tampa Bay Rowdies	34	11	8	15	44	44	0	41	
13	Penn FC	34	9	10	15	38	47	−9	37	
14	Atlanta United 2	34	7	10	17	37	72	−35	31	
15	Richmond Kickers	34	6	4	24	30	80	−50	22	
16	Toronto FC II	34	4	6	24	42	77	−35	18	

Source: 2018 USL standings
Rules for classification: 1) total wins; 2) total goal differential; 3) total goals scored; 4) points earned against top four Conference finishers; 5) disciplinary points; 6) coin toss or drawing of lots
(C) Champions; (X) Regular Season League Champion

Western Conference

Pos	Team	Pld	W	D	L	GF	GA	GD	Pts	Qualification
1	Orange County SC	34	20	6	8	70	40	+30	66	Conference Playoffs
2	Sacramento Republic	34	19	8	7	47	32	+15	65	Conference Playoffs
3	Phoenix Rising FC	34	19	6	9	63	38	+25	63	Conference Playoffs
4	Real Monarchs	34	19	3	12	55	47	+8	60	Conference Playoffs
5	Reno 1868 FC	34	16	11	7	56	38	+18	59	Conference Playoffs
6	Portland Timbers 2	34	17	4	13	58	49	+9	55	Conference Playoffs
7	Swope Park Rangers	34	15	8	11	52	53	−1	53	Conference Playoffs
8	Saint Louis FC	34	14	11	9	44	38	+6	53	Conference Playoffs
9	San Antonio FC	34	14	8	12	45	48	−3	50	
10	OKC Energy FC	34	12	7	15	43	46	−3	43	
11	Colorado Springs Switchbacks	34	11	6	17	36	39	−3	39	
12	Fresno FC	34	9	12	13	44	38	+6	39	
13	Rio Grande Valley Toros	34	8	14	12	36	42	−6	38	
14	LA Galaxy II	34	10	7	17	60	67	−7	37	
15	Las Vegas Lights FC	34	8	7	19	50	74	−24	31	
16	Seattle Sounders FC 2	34	6	7	21	40	71	−31	25	
17	Tulsa Roughnecks	34	3	12	19	36	77	−41	21	

Source: 2018 USL standings
Rules for classification: 1) total wins; 2) total goal differential; 3) total goals scored; 4) points earned against top four Conference finishers; 5) disciplinary points; 6) coin toss or drawing of lots

====== Playoffs ======
Conference Quarterfinals
October 20 – Louisville Slugger Field
**#1 Louisville City FC**	**4**
#8 Bethlehem Steel FC	0
October 21 – Capelli Sport Stadium
**#4 Rochester Rhinos (a.e.t.)**	**2**
#5 Charlotte Independence	1
October 21 – Al Lang Stadium
**#3 Tampa Bay Rowdies**	**3**
#6 FC Cincinnati	0
October 21 – MUSC Health Stadium
#2 Charleston Battery	0
**#7 New York Red Bulls II**	**4**
October 20 – Rio Tinto Stadium
#1 Real Monarchs	1 (1)
**#8 Sacramento Republic FC (p)**	**1 (3)**
October 21 – Swope Soccer Village
**#4 Swope Park Rangers (p)**	**1 (4)**
#5 Phoenix Rising FC	1 (2)
October 21 – Greater Nevada Field
#3 Reno 1868 FC	0
**#6 OKC Energy FC**	**1**
October 21 – Toyota Field
**#2 San Antonio FC**	**2**
#7 Tulsa Roughnecks	1

Conference Semifinals
October 28 – Louisville Slugger Field
**#1 Louisville City FC**	**1**
#4 Rochester Rhinos	0
October 28 – Al Lang Stadium
#3 Tampa Bay Rowdies	1
**#7 New York Red Bulls II (a.e.t.)**	**2**
October 28 – Children's Mercy Park
#8 Sacramento Republic FC	0
**#4 Swope Park Rangers**	**1**
October 28 – Toyota Field
**#6 OKC Energy FC (p)**	**1 (4)**
#2 San Antonio FC	1 (1)

Conference Finals
November 4 – Louisville Slugger Field
**#1 Louisville City FC (p)**	**1 (4)**
#7 New York Red Bulls II	1 (3)
November 4 – Children's Mercy Park
**#4 Swope Park Rangers (p)**	**0 (7)**
#6 OKC Energy FC	0 (6)

USL Championship
November 13 – Louisville Slugger Field (ESPNU)
**#1 Louisville City FC**	**1**
#4 Swope Park Rangers	0

==== Cup Competitions ====
===== US Open Cup =====
====== Final ======
September 26, 2018
19:00 CDT

Houston Dynamo	3–0	Philadelphia Union
Manotas 4', 25'; Trusty 65' (o.g.)	Report

BBVA Compass Stadium, Houston, Texas
Attendance: 16,060
Referee: Nima Saghafi

==== International Competitions ====
===== CONCACAF Competitions =====
Club	Competition	Final round
FC Dallas	2018 CONCACAF Champions League	Round of 16
Colorado Rapids	2018 CONCACAF Champions League	Round of 16
New York Red Bulls	2018 CONCACAF Champions League	Semi-finals
Seattle Sounders FC	2018 CONCACAF Champions League	Quarter-finals

teams in bold are still active in the competition

====== Round of 16 ======
Team 1	Agg.	Team 2	1st leg	2nd leg
Santa Tecla (El Salvador)	2–5	(United States) **Seattle Sounders FC**	2–1	0–4
Olimpia (Honduras)	1–3	(United States) **New York Red Bulls**	1–1	0–2
Colorado Rapids (United States)	0–2	(Canada) **Toronto FC**	0–2	0–0
**Tauro** (Panama)	3–3 (a)	(United States) FC Dallas	1–0	2–3

====== Quarter-finals ======
Team 1	Agg.	Team 2	1st leg	2nd leg
Seattle Sounders FC (United States)	1–3	(Mexico) **Guadalajara**	1–0	0–3
Tijuana (Mexico)	1–5	(United States) **New York Red Bulls**	0–2	1–3

====== Semi-finals ======
Team 1	Agg.	Team 2	1st leg	2nd leg
**Guadalajara** (Mexico)	1–0	(United States) New York Red Bulls	1–0	0–0

=== Women's ===
==== League Competitions ====
===== National Women's Soccer League =====
====== Overall table ======
Pos	Team	Pld	W	D	L	GF	GA	GD	Pts	
1	North Carolina Courage (C)	24	17	6	1	53	17	+36	57	NWSL Shield
2	Portland Thorns FC	24	12	6	6	40	28	+12	42	NWSL Playoffs
3	Seattle Reign FC	24	11	8	5	27	19	+8	41	NWSL Playoffs
4	Chicago Red Stars	24	9	10	5	38	28	+10	37	NWSL Playoffs
5	Utah Royals FC	24	9	8	7	22	23	−1	35	
6	Houston Dash	24	9	5	10	35	39	−4	32	
7	Orlando Pride	24	8	6	10	30	37	−7	30	
8	Washington Spirit	24	2	5	17	12	35	−23	11	
9	Sky Blue FC	24	1	6	17	21	52	−31	9	

Source: NWSL
Rules for classification: Tiebreakers
(C) Champions

====== NWSL Playoffs ======
**Semi-finals**
**1**	**North Carolina Courage**	**2**
4	Chicago Red Stars	0
**2**	**Portland Thorns FC**	**2**
3	Seattle Reign FC	1

**Championship**
**1**	**North Carolina Courage**	**3**
2	Portland Thorns FC	0

September 22, 2018
4:30pm (EDT)

North Carolina Courage	3–0	Portland Thorns FC
Debinha 13'; McDonald 40', 64'	Report; Report

Providence Park
Portland, Oregon
Attendance: 21,144
Referee: Guido Gonzales Jr.

== Honors ==
=== Professional ===
Men
Competition		Winner
U.S. Open Cup		Houston Dynamo
MLS Supporters' Shield		New York Red Bulls
MLS Cup		Atlanta United FC
USL	Regular season	FC Cincinnati
USL	Playoffs	Louisville City FC

Women
Competition	Winner
NWSL Championship	North Carolina Courage
NWSL Shield	North Carolina Courage
Women's Premier Soccer League	Seattle Sounders Women
United Women's Soccer	Houston Aces

=== Amateur ===
Men
Competition	Team
Premier Development League	Calgary Foothills FC
National Premier Soccer League	Miami FC 2
NCAA Division I Soccer Championship	University of Maryland
NCAA Division II Soccer Championship	Barry University
NCAA Division III Soccer Championship	Tufts University
NAIA Soccer Championship	Central Methodist University

Women
Competition	Team
NCAA Division I Soccer Championship	Florida State University
NCAA Division II Soccer Championship	University of Bridgeport
NCAA Division III Soccer Championship	Williams College
NAIA Soccer Championship	William Carey University

== See also ==
- United States Soccer Federation presidential election, 2018
