= Lourdjina Étienne =

Haitian footballer (born 2007)

Personal information
- Date of birth: 14 July 2007 (age 19)
- Place of birth: Nord, Haiti
- Height: 1.69 m (5 ft 7 in)
- Position: Forward

Team information
- Current team: Bourges (on loan from Fleury)
- Number: 22

Senior career*
Years	Team	Apps	(Gls)
- AS Tigresses
2025–	Fleury	7	(0)
2026–	→ Bourges (loan)	3	(0)

International career^{‡}
2021	Haiti U-14	5	(11)
2024	Haiti U-17	7	(13)
2026–	Haiti	4	(2)
- * Club domestic league appearances and goals as of 8 November 2026 ‡ National team caps and goals as of 4 June 2026

Lourdjina Étienne (born 14 June 2007) is a Haitian professional footballer who plays as a forward for Seconde Ligue club Bourges, on loan from Fleury 91, and the Haiti national team. She received the Golden Ball at the 2024 CONCACAF Women's U-17 Championship.

== Club career ==
=== Early career ===
Born in the department of Nord, Étienne began playing football at the orphanage where she grew up in Kenscoff in the department of Ouest. In 2020, at age 12, she was discovered by the Haitian Football Federation and briefly moved into Camp Nous, the national training center in Croix-des-Bouquets. She then joined leading club AS Tigresses while residing with a host family in Canaan. However, after early 2024, the national league went dormant due to unrest in the country.

In June 2024, Étienne began a weeklong trial with Paris Saint-Germain. Initially training with the reserve side, she got involved in first-team training, scoring in a preseason friendly, as the trial extended for more than two months. She then had a two-month trial with league rivals Lyon until December 2024. In May 2025, she made an unsuccessful trial with Barcelona.

=== Fleury ===
On 15 July 2025, the day after turning 18, Étienne signed a two-year contract with Fleury 91 in the French top flight, making her first transfer overseas. She debuted for the club on 18 October, the fifth day of the season, coming off the bench in a 1–1 draw with Dijon. On 15 November, she scored her first goal for the club, scoring the last for Fleury in a 5–2 win over Le Mans in the Coupe LFFP group stage.

In October 2026, having barely featured for Fleury, Étienne was sent on loan to newly promoted Seconde Ligue club Bourges. She debuted for the club in a 1–1 draw with Thonon Evian in the Coupe LFFP league phase, which Bourges won 4–2 on penalties.

== International career ==
Étienne scored 11 goals at the Caribbean Football Union (CFU) U14 Challenge Series in 2021, capturing the title with Haiti. She scored 8 goals at the 2024 CONCACAF Women's U-17 Championship while leading Haiti to fourth place in the competition. She finished as the tournament's top scorer (tied with Kennedy Fuller) and was dubbed the tournament's Best Player. She was the third Haitian player to become top scorer in the competition after Nérilia Mondésir in 2016 and Melchie Dumornay in 2018.

On 5 June 2026, Étienne made her debut for the Haiti senior squad, scoring the 2–1 friendly winner against New Zealand.

== Honors and awards ==
Individual

- CONCACAF Women's U-17 Championship Golden Ball: 2024
