= 2024 CONCACAF Women's U-17 Championship =

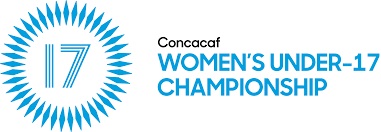

Tournament details
- Host country: Mexico
- City: Toluca
- Dates: 1–11 February
- Teams: 8 (from 1 confederation)
- Venue: 1 (in 1 host city)

Final positions
- Champions: United States (6th title)
- Runners-up: Mexico
- Third place: Canada
- Fourth place: Haiti

Tournament statistics
- Matches played: 16
- Goals scored: 82 (5.13 per match)
- Top scorer(s): (Haiti) Lourdjina Étienne (United States) Kennedy Fuller (8 goals each)
- Best player: (Haiti) Lourdjina Étienne
- Best goalkeeper: (Mexico) Camila Vázquez
- Fair play award: United States
- All statistics correct as of 11 February 2024.

The 2024 CONCACAF Women's U-17 Championship was the 8th edition of the CONCACAF Women's U-17 Championship, the biennial international youth football championship organized by CONCACAF for the women's under-17 national teams of the North, Central American and Caribbean region.

The top two teams of the tournament qualified for the 2024 FIFA U-17 Women's World Cup as the CONCACAF representatives alongside the Dominican Republic being the hosts of the World Cup.

== Qualification ==
28 teams originally entered the qualification stage, but after the draw only 18 teams remained. The six group winners qualified for the tournament alongside Mexico and the USA who entered the competition as the two highest-ranked teams.

Team	Qualification	Appearance	Previous best performance	Previous FIFA U-17 Women's World Cup appearances
Mexico	1st ranked entrant	8th	Champions (2013)	6
United States (title holders)	2nd ranked entrant	8th	Champions (2008, 2012, 2016, 2018, 2022)	5
El Salvador	Group A Winner	4th	Quarter-finals (2022)	0
Haiti	Group B Winner	6th	Fourth place (2016, 2018)	0
Costa Rica	Group C Winner	6th	Runners-up (2008)	2
Puerto Rico	Group D Winner	4th	Fourth place (2022)	0
Panama	Group E Winner	4th	Fourth place (2012)	0
Canada	Group F Winner	8th	Champions (2010)	7

== Venue ==
The matches were played on Campo 1 and Campo 2 at the Federación Mexicana de Fútbol (FMF) headquarters.

2024 CONCACAF Women's U-17 Championship is located in Mexico	Toluca
2024 CONCACAF Women's U-17 Championship is located in Mexico	Mexican Football Federation (FMF)

== Draw ==
The draw of the tournament was held on 3 October 2023 at the CONCACAF Headquarters in Miami, Florida. The 8 teams were drawn into two groups of four teams, based on the CONCACAF Women's Under-17 Ranking in September 2023.

Pot 1	Pot 2	Pot 3	Pot 4
Mexico; United States	Canada; Haiti	Costa Rica; Puerto Rico	El Salvador; Panama

== Squads ==
Players born on or after 1 January 2007 are eligible to compete. Each team must register a squad of 21 players, three of whom must be goalkeepers.

== Group stage ==
All times are local, CST (UTC−6).

=== Group A ===
Pos	Team	Pld	W	D	L	GF	GA	GD	Pts	Qualification
1	Mexico (H)	3	3	0	0	8	0	+8	9	Knockout stage
2	Haiti	3	2	0	1	7	8	−1	6	Knockout stage
3	Costa Rica	3	0	1	2	3	5	−2	1	
4	El Salvador	3	0	1	2	5	10	−5	1	

Source: CONCACAF
(H) Hosts
1 February 2024
12:00

Haiti	2–1	Costa Rica
L. Étienne 45+2', 60'	Report	Ocampo 89'

Campo 1 - FMF, Toluca
Referee: Neressa Goldson (Jamaica)
1 February 2024
15:00

Mexico	3–0	El Salvador
Fragoso 7', 61' (pen.); Sandoval 57'	Report

Campo 1 - FMF, Toluca
Referee: Anya Voigt (United States)

3 February 2024
12:00

El Salvador	3–5	Haiti
H. Hernández 12', 90'; Torres 81'	Report	Désert 4'; L. Étienne 9', 77', 85', 90+2'

Campo 1 - FMF, Toluca
Referee: Kedeen Foster (Cayman Islands)
3 February 2024
15:00

Costa Rica	0–1	Mexico
	Report	Sandoval 8'

Campo 1 - FMF, Toluca
Referee: Carly Shaw-MacLaren (Canada)

5 February 2024
12:00

Costa Rica	2–2	El Salvador
Paniagua 14' (pen.); Fonseca 42'	Report	Brower 30'; H. Hernández 33'

Campo 1 - FMF, Toluca
Referee: Janeishka Cabán (Puerto Rico)
5 February 2024
15:00

Mexico	4–0	Haiti
Sandoval 34'; Fragoso 54'; Sánchez 57'; Dj. Pierre 67' (o.g.)	Report

Campo 1 - FMF, Toluca
Referee: Glenda López (Guatemala)

=== Group B ===
Pos	Team	Pld	W	D	L	GF	GA	GD	Pts	Qualification
1	United States	3	3	0	0	21	1	+20	9	Knockout stage
2	Canada	3	2	0	1	10	6	+4	6	Knockout stage
3	Panama	3	1	0	2	5	20	−15	3	
4	Puerto Rico	3	0	0	3	3	12	−9	0	

Source: CONCACAF
2 February 2024
12:00

United States	13–0	Panama
Townes 8', 19'; Pfeiffer 16', 21', 35' (pen.); Fuller 36', 42', 56', 66', 78'; McLanahan 68'; Hardeman 75'; Scott 80'	Report

Campo 2 - FMF, Toluca
Referee: Deily Gómez (Costa Rica)
2 February 2024
15:00

Canada	5–0	Puerto Rico
A. Chukwu 10', 16', 24'; Tarasco 21'; Bianchin 74'	Report

Campo 2 - FMF, Toluca
Referee: Vimarest Díaz (Dominican Republic)

4 February 2024
12:00

Puerto Rico	1–3	United States
Maldonado 32'	Report	Helfrich 28'; Travers 31' (pen.); Townes 67'

Campo 2 - FMF, Toluca
Referee: Neressa Goldson (Jamaica)
4 February 2024
15:00

Panama	1–5	Canada
Onodera 83'	Report	Hunter 9'; Martin 20'; A. Chukwu 56'; Bianchin 71'; McLeod 90+4'

Campo 2 - FMF, Toluca
Referee: Suleimy Linares Sáez (Cuba)

6 February 2024
12:00

United States	5–0	Canada
Barcenas 9'; Pfeiffer 51'; Powell 57'; Fuller 59'; Nguyen 73'	Report

Campo 2 - FMF, Toluca
Referee: Amairany García (Mexico)
6 February 2024
15:00

Puerto Rico	2–4	Panama
Bengoa 9'; Bevilacqua 65'	Report	González 25'; Tejera 45', 75'; Onodera 49'

Campo 2 - FMF, Toluca
Referee: Shandor Wilkinson (St. Kitts and Nevis)

== Knockout stage ==
=== Bracket ===
Semi-finals
9 February – Toluca
Mexico (a.e.t.)	2
Canada	1
9 February – Toluca
United States	7
Haiti	1

Final
11 February – Toluca
Mexico	0
United States	4
Third place play-off
11 February – Toluca
Canada	4
Haiti	1

=== Semi-finals ===
Winners qualified for the 2024 FIFA U-17 Women's World Cup.

9 February 2024
12:00

United States	7–1	Haiti
Townes 24'; Fuller 40', 48'; Pfeiffer 59'; Ascanio 83', 85', 87'	Report	L. Étienne 80' (pen.)

Campo 1 – FMF, Toluca
Referee: Neressa Goldson (Jamaica)

9 February 2024
15:00

Mexico	2–1 (a.e.t.)	Canada
Montes 25'; Aguilar 101'	Report	A. Chukwu 75'

Campo 1 – FMF, Toluca
Referee: Deily Gómez (Costa Rica)

=== Third place play-off ===
11 February 2024
12:00

Canada	4–1	Haiti
Hunter 45+3' (pen.), 46', 53'; Tarasco 51'	Report	L. Étienne 7'

Campo 1 - FMF, Toluca
Referee: Amairany García (Mexico)

=== Final ===
11 February 2024
15:00

Mexico	0–4	United States
	Report	Townes 11'; Ascanio 23'; González 28' (o.g.); Pfeiffer 62'

Campo 1 - FMF, Toluca
Referee: Vimarest Díaz (Dominican Republic)

== Winners ==
2024 CONCACAF Women's U-17 Championship

United States
6th title

== Goalscorers ==
There were 82 goals scored in 16 matches, for an average of 5.12 goals per match.

8 goals

- (Haiti) Lourdjina Étienne
- (United States) Kennedy Fuller

6 goals

- (United States) Alexandra Pfeiffer

5 goals

- (Canada) Annabelle Chukwu
- (United States) Mya Townes

4 goals

- (Canada) Kaylee Hunter
- (United States) Kimmi Ascanio

3 goals

- (El Salvador) Hailey Hernández
- (Mexico) Abril Fragoso
- (Mexico) Dana Sandoval

2 goals

- (Canada) Adriana Bianchin
- (Canada) Liana Tarasco
- (Panama) Alison Onodera
- (Panama) Yuliana Tejera

1 goal

- (Canada) Keira Martin
- (Canada) Alyssa McLeod
- (Costa Rica) Tanisha Fonseca
- (Costa Rica) Daniela Ocampo
- (Costa Rica) Lucía Paniagua
- (El Salvador) Camila Brower
- (El Salvador) Janelle Torres
- (Haiti) Dominique Désert
- (Mexico) Vanessa Aguilar
- (Mexico) Carla Montes
- (Mexico) Zoé Sánchez
- (Panama) Mia González
- (Puerto Rico) Katsi Bengoa
- (Puerto Rico) Olivia Bevilacqua
- (Puerto Rico) Mailya Maldonado
- (United States) Melanie Barcenas
- (United States) Jordyn Hardeman
- (United States) Caroline Helfrich
- (United States) Rylee McLanahan
- (United States) Y-Lan Nguyen
- (United States) Leena Powell
- (United States) Katharine Scott
- (United States) Jocelyn Travers

1 own goal

- (Haiti) Djoulissa Pierre (against Mexico)
- (Mexico) Adrianna González (against United States)

Source: CONCACAF

== Qualified teams for FIFA U-17 Women's World Cup ==
Team	Qualified on	Previous appearances in FIFA U-17 Women's World Cup^{1}
Dominican Republic	23 June 2023	0 (debut)
United States	9 February 2024	5 (2008, 2012, 2016, 2018, 2022)
Mexico	9 February 2024	6 (2010, 2012, 2014, 2016, 2018, 2022)

^{1} Bold indicates champions for that year. Italic indicates hosts for that year.

== Awards ==
Golden Ball	Golden Boot	Golden Glove
(Haiti) Lourdjina Étienne	(United States) Kennedy Fuller	(Mexico) Camila Vázquez
CONCACAF Fair Play Award
United States
