= 2016 CONCACAF Girls' U-15 Championship =

Tournament details
- Host country: United States
- City: Bay Lake
- Dates: 9–21 August
- Teams: 23 (from CONCACAF + CONMEBOL confederations)
- Venue: 1 (in 1 host city)

Final positions
- Champions: United States (1st title)
- Runners-up: Canada
- Third place: Mexico
- Fourth place: Costa Rica

Tournament statistics
- Matches played: 50
- Goals scored: 261 (5.22 per match)
- Top scorer(s): (Canada) Jordyn Huitema (Mexico) Alison González (Mexico) Natalia Mauleón (United States) Payton Linnehan (United States) Gabrielle Robinson (8 goals each)
- Best player: (United States) Mia Fishel
- Best goalkeeper: (United States) Ruth Jones
- Fair play award: Mexico

The 2016 CONCACAF Girls' U-15 Championship was an association football tournament that took take place in Bay Lake, Florida during August 2016.

== Teams ==
CFU	Anguilla; Antigua and Barbuda; Bahamas; Bermuda; Barbados; Cayman Islands; Curaçao; Dominican Republic; Grenada; Haiti; Jamaica; Saint Lucia; Puerto Rico; Trinidad and Tobago; Saint Vincent and the Grenadines; U.S. Virgin Islands
UNCAF	Costa Rica; Nicaragua; El Salvador
NAFU	Canada; Mexico; United States
CONMEBOL	Venezuela

Venezuela are an invitee.

== Venues ==
All matches will take place at the ESPN Wide World of Sports Complex in Bay Lake, Florida, near Orlando City.

Bay Lake
ESPN Wide World of Sports Complex
28.3379519°N 81.5591789°E

== Group stage ==
=== Tiebreakers ===
The following tiebreaking criteria were established by CONCACAF:

1. Greatest number of points obtained in all group matches
2. Goal difference in all group matches
3. Greatest number of goals scored in all group matches
4. Greatest number of points obtained in matches amongst teams still tied
5. Lots drawn by the Organizing Committee

=== Group A ===
Pos	Team	Pld	W	D	L	GF	GA	GD	Pts	Qualification
1	United States (H)	4	4	0	0	30	0	+30	12	Knockout stage
2	Mexico	4	3	0	1	22	1	+21	9	Knockout stage
3	Haiti	4	2	0	2	10	3	+7	6	
4	Trinidad and Tobago	4	1	0	3	4	38	−34	3	
5	Dominican Republic	4	0	0	4	0	24	−24	0	

Source: CONCACAF
Rules for classification: Tiebreakers
(H) Hosts
August 9, 2016
09:00 ET

United States	22–0	Trinidad and Tobago
Meza 1', 24'; Torres 8'; Robinson 13', 22', 31', 32', 67'; Van Zanten 16', 35'; ? 17' (o.g.); Fishel 26', 47'; DellaPeruta 38'; ? 44' (o.g.); Linnehan 49', 59', 63'; Fontes 56', 57'; Bethune 63', 69'	Report

Field 17
Referee: Carol Berally (Guatemala)
August 9, 2016
11:00 ET

Mexico	2–0	Haiti
Mauleón 9'; Díaz 59'	Report

Field 17

August 10, 2016
09:00 ET

Mexico	0–1	United States
	Report	Fishel 60'

Field 19
August 10, 2016
11:00 ET

Trinidad and Tobago	4–0	Dominican Republic
A. Daniel 2'; Prince 55' (pen.), 64', 69' (pen.)	Report

Field 19

August 12, 2016

Dominican Republic	0–9	Mexico
	Report	Díaz 10'; Gómez 13'; Mauleón 15', 46', 60'; Martínez 44'; Pérez 52'; Vázquez 61', 64'

August 12, 2016

United States	1–0	Haiti
Fontes 35'	Report

August 13, 2016

Haiti	5–0	Trinidad and Tobago
Dumonay 6' (pen.), 17', 35'; S. Joseph 17'; Gustave 29'	Report

August 13, 2016

Dominican Republic	0–6	United States
	Report	Meza 2', 3'; Fontes 9', 40'; Van Zanten 17'; Linnehan 41'

Referee: Hector Martinez (Honduras)

August 15, 2016

Haiti	5–0	Dominican Republic
	Report

August 15, 2016

Trinidad and Tobago	0–11	Mexico
	Report	Pérez 4'; González 11', 32', 35', 37', 40'; Mauleón 19'; García 44'; ? 58' (o.g.); Zamarrón 66'; Ríos 68'

=== Group B ===
Pos	Team	Pld	W	D	L	GF	GA	GD	Pts	Qualification
1	Canada	4	4	0	0	19	0	+19	12	Knockout stage
2	Costa Rica	4	2	1	1	9	7	+2	7	Knockout stage
3	Jamaica	4	2	0	2	7	8	−1	6	
4	El Salvador	4	1	1	2	5	14	−9	4	
5	Venezuela	4	0	0	4	3	13	−10	0	

Source: CONCACAF
Rules for classification: Tiebreakers
August 9, 2016
09:00 ET

Canada	6–0	Venezuela
A. Scott 9'; Ladhani 20'; Riviere 31'; Vallerand 41'; Jones 49'; Akindoju 61'	Report

Field 16
August 9, 2016
11:00 ET

Costa Rica	2–1	Jamaica
Marin 12'; Chinchilla 60'	Report	Harris 53'

Field 16

August 10, 2016
09:00 ET

Costa Rica	0–2	Canada
	Report	Kennedy 24'; Huitema 55'

Field 17
August 10, 2016
11:00 ET

Venezuela	1–2	El Salvador
Cazorla 68'	Report	Calderon 40', 53'

Field 17

August 11, 2016

El Salvador	3–3	Costa Rica
Segovia 27'; Calderon 47', 52'	Report	Salas 32', 51' (pen.), 64'

August 11, 2016

Canada	5–0	Jamaica
Kennedy 23', 51'; Akindoju 31'; Huitema 45' (pen.); Shaw 57'	Report

August 13, 2016

Jamaica	2–1	Venezuela
Washington 25' (pen.); Clarke 32'	Report	Rondon 8'

August 13, 2016

El Salvador	0–6	Canada
	Report	Kennedy 18', 35+1', 39'; Akindoju 27', 41'; Kazandjian 52'

August 15, 2016

Jamaica	4–0	El Salvador
	Report

August 15, 2016

Venezuela	1–4	Costa Rica
? ?'	Report	Gomez ?', ?'; ? ?'; ? ?'

=== Group C ===
Pos	Team	Pld	W	D	L	GF	GA	GD	Pts	Qualification
1	Puerto Rico	4	4	0	0	20	4	+16	12	Knockout stage
2	Saint Lucia	4	3	0	1	9	6	+3	9	Knockout stage
3	Nicaragua	4	1	1	2	3	7	−4	4	
4	Saint Vincent and the Grenadines	4	1	0	3	7	14	−7	3	
5	Grenada	4	0	1	3	6	15	−9	1	

Source: CONCACAF
Rules for classification: Tiebreakers
August 9, 2016
09:00 ET

Puerto Rico	4–1	Saint Lucia
Rivera 3', 9'; T. Pérez 17'; Y. Maldonado 28'	Report	St. Louis 50'

Field 19
August 9, 2016
11:00 ET

Nicaragua	1–1	Grenada
Humphreys 49'	Report	Cas. Rennie 45'

Field 19

August 10, 2016
09:00 ET

Nicaragua	1–4	Puerto Rico
Calero 65'	Report	Y. Maldonado 7'; Colón 10'; Rivera 19'; Torres 67'

Field 16
August 10, 2016
11:00 ET

Saint Lucia	5–1	Saint Vincent and the Grenadines
St. Prix 11', 37'; Jones 23'; Henry 64'; Bernard 69'	Report	Delplache 46'

Field 16

August 12, 2016

Saint Vincent and the Grenadines	0–1	Nicaragua
	Report	Humphreys 27'

August 12, 2016

Puerto Rico	7–1	Grenada
Torres 6'; Colón 17'; R. Pérez 27'; Rivera 50'; Vázquez 61'; Y. Maldonado 70+1', 70+3'	Report	B. Charles 54'

August 14, 2016

Grenada	1–2	Saint Lucia
	Report

August 14, 2016

Saint Vincent and the Grenadines	1–5	Puerto Rico
? ?'	Report	Colón ?', ?', ?'; ? ?'; ? ?'

August 15, 2016

Grenada	3–5	Saint Vincent and the Grenadines
	Report

August 15, 2016

Saint Lucia	1–0	Nicaragua
? ?' (o.g.)	Report

=== Group D ===
Pos	Team	Pld	W	D	L	GF	GA	GD	Pts	Qualification
1	Curaçao	3	3	0	0	12	0	+12	9	Knockout stage
2	Barbados	3	2	0	1	11	3	+8	6	
3	Anguilla	3	1	0	2	0	5	−5	3	
4	U.S. Virgin Islands	3	0	0	3	0	17	−17	0	

Source: CONCACAF
Rules for classification: Tiebreakers
August 11, 2016
09:00 ET

Barbados	9–0	U.S. Virgin Islands
King 22', 66'; Padmore 24', 49'; Sealy 32', 51', 63'; Kirton-Browne 38'; Stevenson ?'	Report

August 11, 2016
11:00 ET

Curaçao	3–0	Anguilla
Stephens 35'; Hart 66', 70+2'	Report

August 12, 2016

U.S. Virgin Islands	0–6	Curaçao
	Report	Tokaay 7', 50'; Hart 23', 64', 66'; Stephens 36'

August 12, 2016

Anguilla	0–2	Barbados
	Report	Sealy 9'; Romney 63' (o.g.)

August 14, 2016

Curaçao	3–0	Barbados
Rosa ?', ?'; ? ?'	Report

August 14, 2016

Anguilla	2–0	U.S. Virgin Islands
	Report

=== Group E ===
Pos	Team	Pld	W	D	L	GF	GA	GD	Pts	Qualification
1	Bermuda	3	3	0	0	13	2	+11	9	Knockout stage
2	Cayman Islands	3	2	0	1	6	3	+3	6	
3	Bahamas	3	1	0	2	5	7	−2	3	
4	Antigua and Barbuda	3	0	0	3	2	14	−12	0	

Source: CONCACAF
Rules for classification: Tiebreakers
August 11, 2016
09:00 ET

Bermuda	3–0	Cayman Islands
Gibbons 3'; Nesbeth 34'; Christopher 60'	Report

August 11, 2016
11:00 ET

Antigua and Barbuda	1–4	Bahamas
Z. Samuel 4'	Report	McKenzie 14', 70+1' (pen.); G. Simms 16'; Yallop 65'

August 13, 2016

Cayman Islands	3–0	Antigua and Barbuda
Deslandes-Hydes 8'; Gourzong 35+2' (pen.); Suberan 63'	Report

August 13, 2016

Bahamas	1–3	Bermuda
A. Simms 61'	Report	Nesbeth 22', 36'; Gibbons 46'

August 14, 2016

Antigua and Barbuda	1–7	Bermuda
? ?'	Report	Nesbeth ?', ?', ?'; ? ?'; ? ?'; ? ?'; ? ?'

August 14, 2016

Bahamas	0–3	Cayman Islands
	Report

== Knockout stage ==
Quarter-finals
United States	12
Bermuda	0
Costa Rica	5
Saint Lucia	0
Canada	10
Curaçao	0
Puerto Rico	1
Mexico	10

Semi-finals
United States	5
Costa Rica	0
Canada	3
Mexico	1

Final
United States	2
Canada	0
Third place
Costa Rica	1
Mexico	5

=== Quarter-finals ===
August 17, 2016

United States	12–0	Bermuda
Robinson 5', 13' (pen.); Linnehan 9', 19', 29'; Fishel 22', 33', 36'; Mercado 24', 35'; Van Zanten 44'; Meza 46'	Report

August 17, 2016

Canada	10–0	Curaçao
Riviere 18', 45'; Ladhani 21'; Huitema 24', 33', 37', 43'; Kostecki 61'; O. Scott 65'; Akindoju 69'	Report

August 17, 2016

Costa Rica	5–0	Saint Lucia
Salas 2', 37'; Chinchilla 4'; Gomez 19'; Marin ?'	Report

August 17, 2016

Puerto Rico	1–10	Mexico
Colón 47'	Report	Pérez 16'; Mauleón 19', 37'; Ríos 26'; González 28'; Díaz 42', 50'; Martínez 62', 67'; Arellano 64'

=== Semi-finals ===
August 19, 2016

United States	5–0	Costa Rica
Robinson 1'; Van Zanten 23', 35+1'; Fishel 39'; Linnehan 44'	Report

August 19, 2016

Canada	3–1	Mexico
Huitema 7', 21'; Riviere 15'	Report	Vázquez 5'

=== Third-place playoff ===
August 21, 2016
09:00

Costa Rica	1–5	Mexico
Chinchilla 24'	Report	González 15', 67'; Pérez 18', 25'; Mauleón 30'

Referee: Carol Oliva (Guatemala)

=== Final ===
August 21, 2016
11:00

United States	2–0	Canada
Van Zanten 39'; Meza 58'	Report

Referee: Odette Hamilton (Jamaica)

== Goalscorers ==
In total, 261 goals were scored in 50 games.

8 goals

- (Canada) Jordyn Huitema
- (Mexico) Alison González
- (Mexico) Natalia Mauleón
- (United States) Payton Linnehan
- (United States) Gabrielle Robinson

7 goals

- (United States) Mia Fishel
- (United States) Kalyssa Van Zanten (Note: She switched her international allegiance into Jamaica in 2021.)

6 goals

- (Bermuda) Leilanni Nesbeth
- (Canada) Sydney Kennedy
- (Puerto Rico) María Luisa Colón
- (United States) Samantha Meza

5 goals

- (Canada) Teni Akindoju
- (Costa Rica) María Paula Salas
- (Curaçao) Lindsey Hart
- (Mexico) Nicole Pérez
- (United States) Sunshine Fontes

4 goals

- (Barbados) Tiana Sealy
- (Canada) Jayde Riviere
- (El Salvador) Lesly Calderón
- (Mexico) Alejandra Díaz
- (Puerto Rico) Yarelis Maldonado
- (Puerto Rico) Isabelle Rivera

3 goals

- (Costa Rica) Priscila Chinchilla
- (Costa Rica) Nicole Gómez
- (Haiti) Melchie Dumonay
- (Mexico) Ashly Martínez
- (Mexico) Anette Vázquez
- (Trinidad and Tobago) Aaliyah Prince

2 goals

- (The Bahamas) Tyra McKenzie
- (Barbados) Marissa King
- (Barbados) Caitlin Padmore
- (Bermuda) Adia Gibbons
- (Canada) Maya Ladhani
- (Costa Rica) Carmen Marín
- (Curaçao) Jathsury Rosa
- (Curaçao) Staygin Stephens
- (Curaçao) Riesmarly Tokaay
- (Mexico) Ximena Ríos
- (Nicaragua) Yorcelly Humphreys
- (Puerto Rico) Gabriela Torres
- (Saint Lucia) Britanya St. Prix
- (United States) Croix Bethune
- (United States) Madison Mercado

1 goal

- (Antigua and Barbuda) Zolique Samuel
- (The Bahamas) Abigail Simms
- (The Bahamas) Gabrielle Simms
- (The Bahamas) Mickell Yallop
- (Barbados) Rowland Kirton-Browne
- (Barbados) Asha Stevenson
- (Bermuda) Nia Christopher
- (Canada) Mya Jones
- (Canada) Lara Kazandjian
- (Canada) Julia Kostecki
- (Canada) Aaliyah Scott
- (Canada) Olivia Scott
- (Canada) Caitlin Shaw
- (Canada) Julianne Vallerand
- (Cayman Islands) Arthmeis Deslandes-Hydes
- (Cayman Islands) Daniella Gourzong
- (Cayman Islands) Sabrina Suberan
- (El Salvador) Maggi Segovia
- (Grenada) Britney Charles
- (Grenada) Cassie Rennie
- (Haiti) Angeline Gustave
- (Haiti) Sheelove Joseph
- (Jamaica) Spice Clarke
- (Jamaica) Shannia Harris
- (Jamaica) Giselle Washington
- (Mexico) Fátima Arellano
- (Mexico) Aislinn García
- (Mexico) Karen Gómez
- (Mexico) Esmeralda Zamarrón
- (Nicaragua) Dayana Calero
- (Puerto Rico) Rocio Pérez
- (Puerto Rico) Thalia Pérez
- (Puerto Rico) Carolina Vázquez
- (Saint Lucia) Tanika Bernard
- (Saint Lucia) Geen Henry
- (Saint Lucia) Tessa Jones
- (Saint Lucia) Krysan St. Louis
- (Saint Vincent and the Grenadines) Arriel Delplache
- (Trinidad and Tobago) Annika Daniel
- (United States) Talia DellaPeruta
- (United States) Hollyn Torres
- (Venezuela) María Cazorla
- (Venezuela) Kelsy Rondón

Own goals

- (Anguilla) Lala Romney (against Barbados)
- (Nicaragua) (against Saint Lucia)
- (Trinidad and Tobago) (against Mexico)
- (Trinidad and Tobago) (against United States)
- (Trinidad and Tobago) (against United States)

Teams with unaccounted goals

- (Anguilla) 2 goals (against U.S. Virgin Islands)
- (Antigua and Barbuda) 1 goal (against Bermuda)
- (Bermuda) 4 goals (against Antigua and Barbuda)
- (Cayman Islands) 3 goals (against Bahamas)
- (Costa Rica) 2 goals (against Venezuela)
- (Curaçao) 1 goal (against Barbados)
- (Haiti) 5 goals (against Dominican Republic)
- (Grenada) 1 goal (against Saint Lucia)
- (Grenada) 3 goals (against Saint Vincent and Grenadines)
- (Jamaica) 4 goals (against El Salvador)
- (Puerto Rico) 2 goals (against Saint Vincent and Grenadines)
- (Saint Lucia) 2 goals (against Grenada)
- (Saint Vincent and the Grenadines) 5 goals (against Grenada)
- (Saint Vincent and the Grenadines) 1 goal (against Puerto Rico)
- (Venezuela) 1 goal (against Costa Rica)

== Player awards ==
The Technical Study Group announced the tournament's Best XI and awards following the final.

Best XI

Goalkeeper	Defenders	Midfielders	Forward
(United States) Ruth Jones	(Costa Rica) Camila Capmany (United States) Leah Scarpelli (Canada) Maya Antoine (Canada) Julianne Vallerand	(United States) Samantha Meza (United States) Croix Bethune (United States) Mia Fishel (Mexico) Dania Nicole Pérez (United States) Gabrielle Robinson	(Canada) Jordyn Huitema

Player of the Tournament (Golden Ball)

- (United States) Mia Fishel

Golden Boot

- (United States) Payton Linnehan (8 goals)

Golden Glove

- (United States) Ruth Jones

Fair Play Award

- Mexico

== Rosters ==
The rosters were published on August 9, 2016.

ANGUILLA		ANTIGUA & BARBUDA		BAHAMAS	
GK	Sammy Connor	GK	Jermara Dennis	GK	Ambrielle Major
GK	Akiarra Pina-Richardson	GK	Sheniqua Laville	GK	Kendi Outten
DF	Liyah Adams	DF	Briana Auguiste	DF	Aliyah Clarke
DF	Ivory Crump	DF	Dujonique Browne	DF	Claudisha Curtis
DF	Danna Richardson	DF	Shunnye Christopher	DF	Derrica Ferguson
DF	Shanna Richardson	DF	Weisnella Downer	DF	Danae Malcolm
DF	Lala Romney	DF	Kameely Jackson	DF	Tenniya Martin
DF	Nyka Ruchardson	DF	Tarika Philip	DF	Adonya Rolle
MF	Ta-Leah Bradshaw	DF	Demica Samuel	DF	Tori Seymour
MF	Carlia Johnson	MF	Ashana Lawerence	MF	Cimone Hanna
MF	Carla Gumbs	MF	Tyanna Simon	MF	Tyra Mckenzie
MF	Lesha Gumbs	MF	Ta Janica Thomas	MF	Kourtni Pinder
MF	Neasha Hodge	MF	Danesia Wilson	MF	Gabrielle Simms
MF	Annick Pichevin	FW	Jada Benjamin	MF	Abigail Simms
MF	T'shara Rogers	FW	Janequa Lewis	MF	Mckell Yallop
MF	Renyana Richardson	FW	Zolique Samuel	MF	Abigail Victor
MF	Bria Richardson	FW	Virginia Simon	FW	Jenai Adderley
MF	T'shara Rogers	FW	Shekeyria Tonge	FW	Angel Daxon
FW	Maiesha Minette				
BARBADOS		BERMUDA		CANADA	
GK	Shontee Broomes	GK	Giaya Melakot	GK	Sophie Guilmette
GK	Jade Clarke	GK	Zakhari Turner	GK	Kat Haarmann
DF	Olianna Bishop	DF	Jordan Davis	DF	Maya Antoine
DF	Aaliyah Boyce	DF	Delia Ebbin	DF	Alexia Cajilig
DF	Tia Briggs-Thompson	DF	Koa Goodchild	DF	Isabella Hanisch
DF	Tia Haynes	DF	Danni Watson	DF	Julia Kostecki
DF	Keinelle Johnson	DF	Megan Titerton	DF	Sonia Walk
MF	Alana Boyce	MF	Trinae Edwards	MF	Mya Jones
MF	Hope Colucci	MF	Adia Gibbons	MF	Lara Kazandjian
MF	Marissa King	MF	Jaden Masters	MF	Maya Ladhani
MF	Rowland Kirton-Browne	MF	Tianna Mullan	MF	Olivia Scott
MF	Jadzia Morris	MF	Leilanni Nesbeth	MF	Caitlin Shaw
MF	Zara Owen	MF	Lindsey Pacheco	FW	Teni Akindoju
MF	Britnee Standford	MF	Jya Ratteray Smith	FW	Jordyn Huitema
MF	Asha Stevenson	MF	Jadea Steede Hill	FW	Sydney Kennedy
FW	Caitlin Padmore	FW	Sh'nyah Akinstall	FW	Jayde Riviere
FW	Tiana Sealy	FW	Emily Cabral	FW	Aaliyah Scott
FW	Ryanna Thomas	FW	Nia Christopher	FW	Julianne Vallerand
CAYMAN ISLANDS		COSTA RICA		CURACAO	
GK	Ericia Burke	GK	Fabiana Solano	GK	Shariëntely Francisca
GK	Satiah Miller	GK	Veronica Trigueros	GK	Tihainy Nicolaas
DF	Arthmeis Deslandes	DF	Adina Badilla	DF	Evy Huiskens
DF	Marlena Elvin	DF	Andrea Capmany	DF	Rosheny Kastaneer
DF	Cyan Francis	DF	Camila Capmany	DF	Jurina Kook
DF	Daniella Gourzong	DF	Pamela Gutierrez	DF	Fresheny Michiel
DF	Aleksei Morris-Symour	DF	Yariella Lopez	DF	Missuenly Reina
DF	Avigail Ramirez	DF	Nathlie Rojas	DF	Jathsury Rosa
DF	Chyanai Tibbetts	MF	Steysi Arias	DF	Thirza Van Arkel
MF	Ashley Ebanks	MF	Priscila Chinchilla	MF	Lindsey Hart
MF	Shannelle Bennett	MF	Nicole Gomez	MF	Sjulienne Martina
MF	Monique Hernandez	MF	Carmen Marin	MF	Shahrazed Tizraqui
MF	Brianna Poy Fong	MF	Stefany Mendoza	MF	Reismarly Tokaay
MF	Hannah Scott	MF	Maria Paula Porras	FW	Loenairies Hose
FW	Shayla Connor	MF	Jeimy Umaña	FW	Aryse Nicholson
FW	Molly Kehoe	FW	Alexa Aguilar	FW	Nikki Quilotte
FW	Sabrina Suberan	FW	Medolyn Guerrero	FW	Kaylee Siliee
FW	Ethana Villilobos	FW	María Paula Salas	FW	Staygin Stephens
DOMINICAN REPUBLIC		EL SALVADOR		GRENADA	
GK	Nayeli Lopez	GK	Gilma Martir	GK	Sabrina Rennie
GK	Carla Peralta	GK	Nathalie Martinez	DF	Abigail Adewunmi
DF	Katia Constanzo	GK	Paolina Molina	DF	Resheda Charles
DF	Jaely Encarnacion	DF	Clendida Blanco	DF	Cardisha Rennie
DF	Carmen Lorenzo	DF	Samaria Gomez	DF	Erin Sylvester
DF	Richeymi Mejia	DF	Angela Guinea	DF	Treasher Valcin
DF	Miranda Montes	DF	Gabriela Monjaras	MF	Akia Calliste
DF	Minyeti Mancebo	DF	Hileana Morales	MF	Sheranda Charles
DF	Juanly Perez	DF	Jessica Ortiz	MF	Cassie Rennie
MF	Nathaly Acosta	DF	Evelin Panilla	MF	Coie Smith
MF	Claudia Alcantara	MF	Arianna Buchanan	FW	Ariel Andrew
MF	Georgina Hernandez	MF	Avery Fanslow	FW	Britney Charles
MF	Yamely Lopez	MF	Gloria Gonzalez	FW	Katarzyna Gatt
MF	Marianelis Perez	MF	Alyssa Menjivar	FW	Aaliyah Jackson
MF	Deborah Tavarez	MF	Maggi Segovia	FW	Shaniah Johnson
FW	Yordi Espinal	MF	Tatiana Soriano	FW	Diamond Lewis
FW	Karla Muñiz	FW	Lesly Calderon	FW	Ruth Lewis
		FW	Abigail Rivas	FW	Malia Ramdhanny
HAITI		JAMAICA		MEXICO	
GK	Madelina Fleuriot	GK	Jada Schokley	GK	Ana Ruvalcaba
GK	Edjenie Joseph	GK	Sher Young	GK	Shyh Saenz
DF	Rachelle Caremus	DF	Tacia Austin	DF	Karen Gomez
DF	Sheelove Joseph	DF	Kav Howell	DF	Julieta Peralta
DF	Tabita Joseph	DF	Mo McLaughlin	DF	Ximena Rios
DF	Nancy Lindor	DF	Janeil Simpson	DF	Kelly Rodriguez
DF	Ruthny Mathurin	DF	Chris Roberts	DF	Giovanna Urbalejo
MF	Elizabeth Brivil	MF	Gail Able	DF	Esmeralda Zamarron
MF	Melchie Daelle Dumonay	MF	Spice Clarke	MF	Fatima Arellano
MF	Angeline Gustave	MF	Shaq Forbes	MF	Aislinn Garcia
MF	Dieunica Jean Baptiste	MF	Suen Gregory	MF	Noemi Granados
MF	Abaina Louis	MF	Kelly Nunes	MF	Alice Hernandez
MF	Sandrine Merant	MF	Kersha Thomas	MF	Ashly Martinez
MF	Vladine Mervilus	MF	Giselle Washington	MF	Dania Perez
MF	Betina Petit-Frere	FW	Kayla Bailey	MF	Anette Vazquez
MF	Flero Dina Surpris	FW	Jody Brown	FW	Alejandra Díaz
FW	Danielle Étienne	FW	Shania Harris	FW	Alison Gonzalez
FW	Maile Jean	FW	Monique Perrier	FW	Maria Mauleon
NICARAGUA		PUERTO RICO		SAINT LUCIA	
GK	Ashly Delgadillo	GK	Grecia Prieto	GK	Qiana Joseph
GK	Valeria Roblero	GK	J Lo Varada	GK	Kenna Lionel
DF	Sofia Coen	DF	Yarimar Correa	DF	Sasha Alcide
DF	Alejandra Fonseca	DF	Karina Gines	DF	Tiffany Allain
DF	Reyna Roblero	DF	Daniela Perez	DF	Shakera Classe
MF	Kellsey Arguello	DF	Bianca Rosado	DF	Faith Emmanuel
MF	Bayola Carcache	DF	Juliette Wolpert	DF	Thai Fowell
MF	Victoria Crowe	MF	Sofia Alvarez	DF	Tessa Jones
MF	Elizabeth Pierson	MF	Maria Luisa Colon	MF	Steffany Allain
MF	Kristel Ruiz	MF	Soleil Maldonado	MF	Geen Henry
MF	Stephanie Ruiz	MF	Yarielis Maldonado	MF	Ilana Lashley
MF	Camila Sequeira	MF	Rocio Perez	MF	Melanie Richard
MF	Ana Silva	MF	Mariana Varela	MF	Britanya St Prix
FW	Dayana Calero	FW	Thalia Perez	MF	Cassandra Shephard
FW	Meykey Delgadillo	FW	Isabelle Rivera	FW	Tanika Bernard
FW	Yorcelly Humpherys	FW	Carolina Vazquez	FW	Kayle Camille
FW	Nohelia Velasquez	FW	Gabriela Torres	FW	Nicofia Joseph
				FW	Krysan St Louis
ST VINCENT & THE GRENADINES		TRINIDAD & TOBAGO		U.S. VIRGIN ISLANDS	
GK	Somonique Laborde	GK	Aaliyah Alexander	GK	Danielle Parker
GK	Zerese Williams	GK	Chelsea Ramnauth	GK	Call'sha Wrensford
DF	Krystal Foster	DF	Kady Adams	DF	Era Daniel
DF	Arenna Grant	DF	Tianna Daniel	DF	Tia Hughes
DF	Shannell Lampkin	DF	Timia Mcmillan	DF	Riley Oram
DF	Sonja Mckie	DF	Gamelia Waldron	DF	Je'mia Ortiz
DF	Ka'mya Matthews	DF	Roshun Williams	DF	Lily Pierce
DF	Vashica Pereira	MF	Kayla Baboolal	MF	Manal Abed
MF	Chelsea Cordice	MF	Annika Daniel	MF	Judah Diamonback
MF	Cavorn Delpesche	MF	Natifah Hackshaw	MF	Adelaide Jones
MF	Dionte Delpeche	MF	Jessica Harragin	MF	Vanshika Lulla
MF	Ushon Edwards	MF	Aaliya Lynch	MF	Grace Shimansky
MF	Kitanna Richards	MF	Chrissy Mitchell	FW	Anjahlique Bowry
MF	Laquanda Soso	MF	Maria-Frances Serrant	FW	Lunique Henley
MF	Shaielle Williams	MF	Shamika York	FW	Aspen Jones
FW	Aerril Delpieche	FW	Afiyah Cornwall	FW	Brianne Jones
FW	Ashanti Douglas	FW	Aaliyah Prince	FW	Avia Joseph
FW	Areka Hooper	FW	Tyanna Williams	FW	Nia Woods
USA		VENEZUELA			
GK	Ruth Jones	GK	Aranzha Aguiar		
GK	Lindsey Romig	GK	Adnhachiel Porras		
DF	D'awncey Jones-Black	DF	Maria Davila		
DF	Tori Hansen	DF	Daniela Martinez		
DF	Makenna Morris	DF	Andreina Rodriguez		
DF	Leah Scarpelli	DF	Valentina Salvatierra		
DF	Natalia Staude	DF	Nahomi Santaella		
MF	Croix Bethune	MF	Alessia Bianchini		
MF	Talia DellaPeruta	MF	Sofia Bolivar		
MF	Mia Fishel	MF	Maria Cazorla		
MF	Eleanor Glenn	MF	Eulimar Chirinos		
MF	Madison Mercado	MF	Mariangel Delgado		
MF	Gabrielle Robinson	MF	Analeis Diaz		
MF	Hollyn Torres	MF	Daniela Rodriguez		
FW	Sunshine Fontes	MF	Liurca Guacare		
FW	Payton Linnehan	MF	Lady Vera		
FW	Samantha Meza	FW	Jairelys La Rosa		
FW	Kalyssa Van Zanten	FW	Keisy Rondon		
