= 2024 CONCACAF Women's U-17 Championship qualification =

2024 CONCACAF Women's U-17 Championship qualifying
Tournament details
- Host country: Curacao; Dominican Republic; Costa Rica; Jamaica
- Dates: 25 – 31 August 2023
- Teams: 18
- Venues: 5 (in 5 host cities)

Tournament statistics
- Matches played: 22
- Goals scored: 137 (6.23 per match)
- Top scorer(s): (El Salvador) Breanna Medina (7 goals)

2024 CONCACAF Women's U-17 Championship qualifying was the qualifying tournament for the 2024 CONCACAF Women's U-17 Championship. Eighteen teams competed for six spots in the final tournament, where they will join the 2 highest-seeded teams in the competition, Mexico and the USA.

== Draw ==
United States and Mexico, as the two highest-ranked teams, were exempt from participating in the qualification.

Dominican Republic will host the 2024 FIFA U-17 Women's World Cup and, therefore, is exempt from participating in the tournament.

The draw for the group stage took place on 6 July 2023, 11:00 EDT (UTC−4), at the CONCACAF Headquarters in Miami. The 28 teams which initially entered qualifying were drawn into six groups of four or five teams. However, ten teams withdrew after the draw, the format was kept the same, with two groups only having two teams, two groups with three teams, and two groups with four teams. Based on the CONCACAF Women's Under-17 Ranking, the original teams were distributed into five pots, as follows:

Pot 1	Pot 2	Pot 3	Pot 4	Pot 5
Canada; Costa Rica; Haiti; Jamaica; Puerto Rico; El Salvador	Trinidad and Tobago; Guatemala; Panama; Bermuda; Honduras; Cuba	Nicaragua; ~~Saint Kitts and Nevis~~ (W); ~~Grenada~~ (W); Curaçao; ~~Guyana~~ (W); Barbados	~~Antigua and Barbuda~~ (W); ~~Anguilla~~ (W); U.S. Virgin Islands; ~~Turks and Caicos Islands~~ (W); Dominica; Cayman Islands	~~Saint Vincent and the Grenadines~~ (W); ~~Guadeloupe~~ (W); ~~Martinique~~ (W); ~~Saint Martin~~ (W)

- (W): Withdrew after draw.

== Qualifying stage ==
The winners of each group qualified for the final tournament. All matches were played at five different locations: Willemstad in Curaçao, San Cristobal in the Dominican Republic, Santo Domingo also in the Dominican Republic, Alajuela in Costa Rica, and lastly in Kingston in Jamaica. All times are local, EST (UTC−5).

Tiebreakers

The ranking of teams in each group is determined as follows (Regulations Article 12.3):

1. Points obtained in all group matches (three points for a win, one for a draw, zero for a loss);
2. Goal difference in all group matches;
3. Number of goals scored in all group matches;
4. Points obtained in the matches played between the teams in question;
5. Goal difference in the matches played between the teams in question;
6. Number of goals scored in the matches played between the teams in question;
7. Fair play points in all group matches:
  - Yellow card: −1 points;
  - Indirect red card (two yellow cards): −3 points;
  - Direct red card: −4 points;
  - Yellow card and direct red card: −5 points;
8. Drawing of lots.

=== Group A ===
Pos	Team	Pld	W	D	L	GF	GA	GD	Pts	Qualification
1	El Salvador	3	3	0	0	25	0	+25	9	2024 CONCACAF Women's U-17 Championship
2	Trinidad and Tobago	3	2	0	1	9	6	+3	6	
3	Cayman Islands	3	1	0	2	1	16	−15	3	
4	Curaçao	3	0	0	3	0	13	−13	0	

Source: CONCACAF
Rules for classification: Qualifying stage tiebreakers
26 August 2023

El Salvador	12–0	Cayman Islands
Lino 10'; Medina 13', 49', 88'; Jurado 23'; Torres 33'; Brower 33'; Márquez 50', 86'; Portillo 53', 79'; Ramos 79'	Report

Stadion Rignaal 'Jean' Francisca, Willemstad, Curaçao
27 August 2023

Trinidad and Tobago	5–0	Curaçao
Alexander 4', 17', 32', 47'; Gosine 36'	Report

Stadion Rignaal 'Jean' Francisca, Willemstad, Curaçao

28 August 2023

Cayman Islands	0–4	Trinidad and Tobago
	Report	Alexander 12'; Gosine 60'; Steele 88'; Salandy 90+1'

Stadion Rignaal 'Jean' Francisca, Willemstad, Curaçao
29 August 2023

Curaçao	0–7	El Salvador
	Report	Carpio 9'; Diaz 45+2', 77'; Marquez 72'; Lino 81'; Jurado 90+2'; Torres 90+5'

Stadion Rignaal 'Jean' Francisca, Willemstad, Curaçao

30 August 2023

El Salvador	6–0	Trinidad and Tobago
Medina 3', 6', 58', 79'; Brower 19'; Portillo 88'	Report

Stadion Rignaal 'Jean' Francisca, Willemstad, Curaçao
31 August 2023

Curaçao	0–1	Cayman Islands
	Report	Lamontagne 67'

Stadion Rignaal 'Jean' Francisca, Willemstad, Curaçao

=== Group B ===
Pos	Team	Pld	W	D	L	GF	GA	GD	Pts	Qualification
1	Haiti	2	2	0	0	18	0	+18	6	2024 CONCACAF Women's U-17 Championship
2	Cuba	2	1	0	1	6	6	0	3	
3	Barbados	2	0	0	2	0	18	−18	0	

Source: CONCACAF
Rules for classification: Qualifying stage tiebreakers
26 August 2023

Cuba	6–0	Barbados
Calvo 14'; Izaguirre 32', 49', 74'; Cordero 90'; Romero 90+3'	Report

Estadio Olímpico Félix Sánchez, San Cristóbal, Dominican Republic

27 August 2023

Barbados	0–12	Haiti
	Report	Nazon 2', 42', 67'; Sainvilus 9'; Saindate 12', 40', 59'; Etienne 15', 25', 88'; Laguerre 16'; Murat 30'

Estadio Panamericano, San Cristóbal, Dominican Republic

29 August 2023

Cuba	0–6	Haiti
	Report	Pierre 26'; Etienne 32', 66'; Nazon 36', 71'; Saindate 61'

Estadio Panamericano, San Cristóbal, Dominican Republic

=== Group C ===
Pos	Team	Pld	W	D	L	GF	GA	GD	Pts	Qualification
1	Costa Rica	2	2	0	0	7	1	+6	6	2024 CONCACAF Women's U-17 Championship
2	Guatemala	2	0	0	2	1	7	−6	0	

Source: CONCACAF
Rules for classification: Qualifying stage tiebreakers
27 August 2023

Costa Rica	2–0	Guatemala
Monge 32'; Castrillo 40'	Report

FEDEFUTBOL Sports Complex, Alajuela, Costa Rica

29 August 2023

Guatemala	1–5	Costa Rica
Alvarez 68'	Report	Monge 3'; Castrillo 8'; Ruiz 47'; Fonseca 58'; Paniagua 87'

FEDEFUTBOL Sports Complex, Alajuela, Costa Rica

=== Group D ===
Pos	Team	Pld	W	D	L	GF	GA	GD	Pts	Qualification
1	Puerto Rico	3	3	0	0	13	2	+11	9	2024 CONCACAF Women's U-17 Championship
2	Nicaragua	3	1	1	1	12	3	+9	4	
3	Honduras	3	1	1	1	7	3	+4	4	
4	U.S. Virgin Islands	3	0	0	3	0	24	−24	0	

Source: CONCACAF
Rules for classification: Qualifying stage tiebreakers
25 August 2023

Puerto Rico	9–0	U.S. Virgin Islands
Roberts 6'; Aviles 9', 75', 82'; Own goal 25'; Bevilacqua 64', 84', 90+3'; Maldonado 76'	Report

Estadio Olímpico Félix Sánchez, Santo Domingo, Dominican Republic
26 August 2023

Honduras	1–1	Nicaragua
Mencia 54'	Report	Navarrete 24'

Estadio Olímpico Félix Sánchez, Santo Domingo, Dominican Republic

27 August 2023

U.S. Virgin Islands	0–5	Honduras
	Report	Lopez 4'; Flores 12', 38', 49'; Zelaya 51'

Estadio Olímpico Félix Sánchez, Santo Domingo, Dominican Republic
28 August 2023

Nicaragua	1–2	Puerto Rico
Quintanilla 38'	Report	Smith 8', 16'

Estadio Olímpico Félix Sánchez, Santo Domingo, Dominican Republic

29 August 2023

Nicaragua	10–0	U.S. Virgin Islands
Garache 12', 30', 38', 64'; Lopez 1', 41', 61'; Quintanilla 50'; Mendez 66'; Navarrete 69'	Report

Estadio Olímpico Félix Sánchez, Santo Domingo, Dominican Republic
30 August 2023

Puerto Rico	2–1	Honduras
Roberts 7'; Smith 47'	Report	Santos 71'

Estadio Olímpico Félix Sánchez, Santo Domingo, Dominican Republic

=== Group E ===
Pos	Team	Pld	W	D	L	GF	GA	GD	Pts	Qualification
1	Panama	2	1	1	0	2	1	+1	4	2024 CONCACAF Women's U-17 Championship
2	Jamaica	2	0	1	1	1	2	−1	1	

Source: CONCACAF
Rules for classification: Qualifying stage tiebreakers
26 August 2023

Jamaica	1–1	Panama
Ashbourne 40'	Report	Onodera 11'

Sabina Park Stadium, Kingston, Jamaica

27 August 2023

Panama	1–0	Jamaica
Arosemena 38'	Report

Sabina Park Stadium, Kingston, Jamaica

=== Group F ===
Pos	Team	Pld	W	D	L	GF	GA	GD	Pts	Qualification
1	Canada	2	2	0	0	30	0	+30	6	2024 CONCACAF Women's U-17 Championship
2	Bermuda	2	1	0	1	4	10	−6	3	
3	Dominica	2	0	0	2	1	25	−24	0	

Source: CONCACAF
Rules for classification: Qualifying stage tiebreakers
26 August 2023

Canada	21–0	Dominica
Istocki 3', 9', 45+2'; Hunter 7', 30', 43', 78'; Brisbin 14'; A. Chukwu 23', 25', 38', 49'; Angus 27'; Perreault 41'; I. Chukwu 52'; Tarasco 63', 86', 87', 90+2'; Van Doesburg 65'; Martin 72'	Report

Estadio Olímpico Félix Sánchez, Santo Domingo, Dominican Republic

28 August 2023

Dominica	1–4	Bermuda
Forde 12'	Report	Lines 14'; Lightbourne 35', 45+2'; Patton 90+3'

Estadio Olímpico Félix Sánchez, Santo Domingo, Dominican Republic

30 August 2023

Bermuda	0–9	Canada
	Report	Chisholm 6'; A. Chukwu 25', 66'; I. Chukwu 37'; Istocki 67', 71', 90+3'; Martin 80'; Bianchin 86'

Estadio Olímpico Félix Sánchez, Santo Domingo, Dominican Republic

== Goalscorers ==
There were 137 goals scored in 22 matches, for an average of 6.23 goals per match.

7 goals

- (El Salvador) Breanna Medina

6 goals

- (Canada) Annabelle Chukwu
- (Canada) Nikolina Istocki

5 goals

- (Haiti) Lourdjina Etienne
- (Haiti) Pierreline Nazon
- (Trinidad and Tobago) J’Eleisha Alexander

4 goals

- (Canada) Kaylee Hunter
- (Canada) Liana Tarasco
- (Haiti) Derline Saindate
- (Nicaragua) Perla Garache

3 goals

- (Cuba) Thalia Izaguirre
- (El Salvador) Giselle Marquez
- (El Salvador) Nahomy Portillo
- (Honduras) Ashley Flores
- (Nicaragua) Aneth Lopez
- (Puerto Rico) Sienna Aviles
- (Puerto Rico) Olivia Bevilacqua
- (Puerto Rico) Lauryn Smith

2 goals

- (Bermuda) Keyandae Lightbourne
- (Canada) Isabelle Chukwu
- (Canada) Keira Martin
- (Costa Rica) Brittany Castrillo
- (Costa Rica) Brigitte Monge
- (El Salvador) Camila Brower
- (El Salvador) Jasmine Diaz
- (El Salvador) Alyssa Jurado
- (El Salvador) Keila Lino
- (El Salvador) Janelle Torres
- (Nicaragua) Veronica Navarrete
- (Nicaragua) Emma Quintanilla
- (Puerto Rico) Susana Roberts
- (Trinidad and Tobago) Nikita Gosine

1 goal

- (Bermuda) Camryn Lines
- (Bermuda) Avani Patton
- (Canada) Mya Angus
- (Canada) Adriana Bianchin
- (Canada) Sadie Brisbin
- (Canada) Olivia Chisholm
- (Canada) Juliette Perreault
- (Canada) Maree-anne Van Doesburg
- (Cayman Islands) Milanna Lamontagne
- (Costa Rica) Tanisha Fonseca
- (Costa Rica) Lucia Paniagua
- (Costa Rica) Tiara Ruiz
- (Cuba) Aneilis Calvo
- (Cuba) Jennifer Cordero
- (Cuba) Elismay Romero
- (Dominica) Le-Myah Forde
- (El Salvador) Genesis Carpio
- (El Salvador) Beatriz Ramos
- (Guatemala) Paola Alvarez
- (Haiti) Aslie Laguerre
- (Haiti) Yvena Murat
- (Haiti) Dalanchy Pierre
- (Haiti) Nehemie Sainvilus
- (Honduras) Yatana Lopez
- (Honduras) Daniela Mencia
- (Honduras) Allanys Santos
- (Honduras) Aileen Zelaya
- (Jamaica) Olivia Ashbourne
- (Nicaragua) Jesneyling Mendez
- (Panama) Analia Arosemena
- (Panama) Alison Onodera
- (Puerto Rico) Mailya Maldonado
- (Trinidad and Tobago) Daneelyah Salandy
- (Trinidad and Tobago) Cherina Steele

1 own goal

- (United States Virgin Islands) Unknown (against Puerto Rico)
