= Sunshine Fontes =

American soccer player (born 2001)

Personal information
- Full name: Sunshine Anuhea Fontes
- Date of birth: February 25, 2001 (age 25)
- Height: 5 ft 4 in (1.63 m)
- Positions: Forward; midfielder

Team information
- Current team: Urawa Red Diamonds
- Number: 19

Youth career
- 2008–2014: Hawaii Rush
- 2015–2017: Honolulu Bulls
- 2017–2019: Hawaii Rush

College career
| Years | Team | Apps | (Gls) |
| 2019–2024 | UCLA Bruins | 85 | (22) |

Senior career*
| Years | Team | Apps | (Gls) |
| 2025 | FC Olympia | 5 | (1) |
| 2025– | Urawa Red Diamonds | 5 | (1) |

International career
| 2016 | United States U-15 | | |
| 2017–2019 | United States U-17 | 32 | (24) |
- * Club domestic league appearances and goals as of July 23, 2026

Sunshine Anuhea Fontes (born February 25, 2001) is an American professional soccer player who plays as a forward for WE League club Urawa Red Diamonds. She played college soccer for the UCLA Bruins, winning the 2022 national championship. She represented the United States at the under-15 and under-17 levels, setting a program record with 24 goals for the under-17 team.

== Early life ==
Fontes was born in Honolulu, Hawaii, to Aloha and Randy Fontes, and has six siblings. She began playing soccer at age four. She played club soccer for Hawaii Rush and the Honolulu Bulls. She had an exceptional freshman season at Pearl City High School, scoring 29 goals while leading the team to its first HHSSA D1 state championship in 19 years. She was named the Honolulu Star-Advertiser State Player of the Year and the Hawaii Gatorade Player of the Year for 2016.

Fontes was named all-state every year in high school, including three first-team selections, and scored 81 career goals. She was again named the Honolulu Star-Advertiser State Player of the Year and the Hawaii Gatorade Player of the Year after her senior year in 2019, though she missed the state tournament after tearing her anterior cruciate ligament (ACL) during the conference semifinals. She originally committed to play college soccer for the Hawaii Rainbow Wahine before switching to the higher-profile UCLA Bruins. TopDrawerSoccer ranked her as the fifth-best prospect in the 2019 class, part of UCLA's second-ranked recruiting class.

== College career ==
Fontes redshirted her freshman season with the UCLA Bruins because of her ACL injury. She played in all 17 games and scored 5 goals as a redshirt freshman in 2020 (the season was held in the spring of 2021), earning Pac-12 Conference all-freshman honors. UCLA won the Pac-12 Conference and lost on penalties in the NCAA tournament third round. She played in all 20 games but scored 0 goals as a redshirt sophomore in 2021. UCLA defended their Pac-12 title but were upset in the NCAA tournament first round.

Fontes became a starter under new head coach Margueritte Aozasa in 2022, leading the Bruins with 11 goals and adding 8 assists in 25 games. She was named second-team All-Pac-12 and scored two goals during the NCAA tournament. UCLA reached the national title game and rallied from a 2–0 deficit to win 3–2 against North Carolina, winning their second national title. Fontes had a match-high five shots, including three on target, and had an assist on UCLA's first goal by Lexi Wright. She was honored nationally as third-team Best XI by TopDrawerSoccer.

Fontes scored 5 goals in 9 games and was named third-team All-Pac-12 in her senior year in 2023, though she missed most of the season after tearing her ACL. She returned to action for a sixth and final year in 2024, scoring 1 goal in 14 appearances. She helped the Bruins win the Big Ten tournament (in their first year in the conference) but lost in the NCAA tournament second round.

== Club career ==
Fontes signed her first professional contract with Japanese club Urawa Red Diamonds in September 2025. She made her professional debut as a stoppage-time substitute in a 2–0 victory over AC Nagano on October 5. On November 16, she scored her first professional goal in the 3rd minute of the 4–1 win over Sfida Setagaya in the Empress's Cup second round.

== International career ==
Fontes helped the United States under-15 team win the 2016 CONCACAF Girls' U-15 Championship, scoring five goals with four assists in seven games. She helped the under-17 team win the title at the 2018 CONCACAF Women's U-17 Championship, scoring two goals against Haiti in the semifinals and one goal against Mexico in the final. She was the tournament's joint top scorer with five goals alongside Haiti's Melchie Dumornay. She had scored four goals against both Venezuela and Argentina earlier in the year, helping make her the all-time top scorer for the United States under-17 team with 22 goals going into the 2018 FIFA U-17 Women's World Cup. She scored twice in the team's opening match against Cameroon, their only win at the tournament. At the end of 2018, she was one of five nominees for U.S. Soccer Young Female Player of the Year alongside her U-17 teammates Maya Doms and Sophia Smith. Following her ACL injury, she was not called up to the youth national team for five years until she joined the under-23 squad for the friendly tournament against National Women's Soccer League (NWSL) teams in the 2023 preseason.

== Honors and awards ==
UCLA Bruins

- NCAA Division I women's soccer tournament: 2022
- Pac-12 Conference: 2020, 2021, 2023
- Big Ten women's soccer tournament: 2024

United States U-15

- CONCACAF Girls' U-15 Championship: 2016

United States U-17

- CONCACAF Women's U-17 Championship: 2018

Individual

- Second-team All-Pac-12: 2022
- Third-team All-Pac-12: 2023
- CONCACAF Women's U-17 Championship Golden Boot: 2018
