= Kiki Van Zanten =

Jamaican footballer (born 2001)

- Van Zanten with the Houston Dash in 2026

Personal information
- Full name: Kalyssa Priscilla Van Zanten
- Date of birth: 25 August 2001 (age 25)
- Place of birth: Buffalo Grove, Illinois, United States
- Height: 1.68 m (5 ft 6 in)
- Positions: Forward; midfielder

Team information
- Current team: Houston Dash
- Number: 12

Youth career
- Stevenson Patriots
- Eclipse Select

College career
Years	Team	Apps	(Gls)
2019–2023	Notre Dame Fighting Irish	95	(27)

Senior career*
Years	Team	Apps	(Gls)
2024–	Houston Dash	46	(7)

International career^{‡}
2016	United States U15	5	(7)
2017–2018	United States U17	9	(2)
2022–	Jamaica	18	(4)
Medal record
Representing the United States
CONCACAF Girls' U-15 Championship
First place	2016 United States
Representing Jamaica
CONCACAF W Championship
Third place	2022 Mexico
- * Club domestic league appearances and goals as of 03:18, 8 November 2026 (UTC) ‡ National team caps and goals as of 05:44, 17 October 2026 (UTC)

Kalyssa Priscilla "Kiki" Van Zanten (born 25 August 2001) is a professional footballer who plays as a midfielder for the Houston Dash of the National Women's Soccer League (NWSL). Born in the United States, she represents Jamaica internationally. She played college soccer for the Notre Dame Fighting Irish.

== Early life ==
Van Zanten was born to a Jamaican mother and an American father of Dutch descent. Her father played college football at Illinois Wesleyan; one of her sisters, Brianna, played college soccer for Case Western Reserve; and her other sister, Mimi, plays for fellow NWSL club San Diego Wave FC.

== Club career ==
Van Zanten was drafted 21st overall by the Houston Dash in the 2024 NWSL Draft and signed a one-year contract with a one-year option in March 2024. She made 4 appearances in her rookie season before missing the remainder of the year with a season-ending foot injury. While in convalescence, Van Zanten signed a new contract with the Dash to keep her in Houston through the 2026 NWSL season. In April 2025, Van Zanten completed her recovery and returned to the Dash's active roster. She scored her first professional goal on August 2, 2025, meeting a cross from Avery Patterson in a 2–2 draw with Bay FC.

In the Dash's second match of 2026, Van Zanten recorded a brace against Boston Legacy FC, becoming the first Houston player to record a multi-goal game since Diana Ordóñez in 2024. Van Zanten also appeared to score a third goal later on in the match, but a late offside call prevented her from registering her first career hat trick.

== International career ==
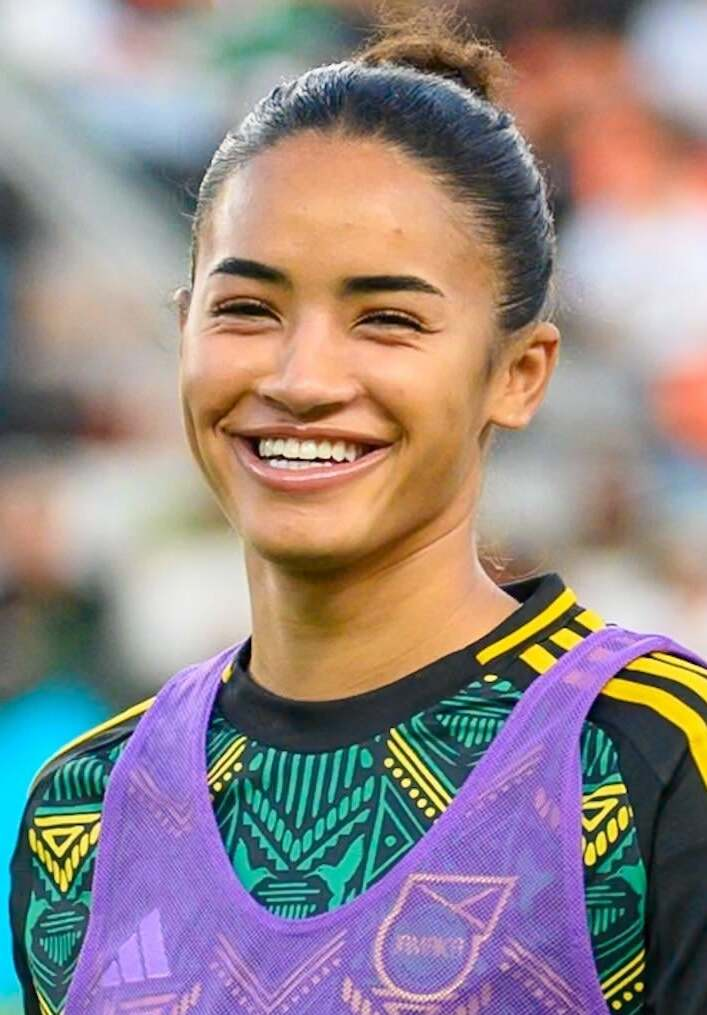
Van Zanten with Jamaica in 2025

Van Zanten made her senior debut in a 4–0 CONCACAF Women's World Cup Qualifiers win against Bermuda on 17 February 2022. She came on in the 98th minute to replace Trudi Carter. She was named in the 2022 CONCACAF W Championship final squad and represented Jamaica at the 2022 CONCACAF W Championship. On 18 July 2022 she scored her debut goal, a winner against Costa Rica to grant Jamaica a third-place finish in the competition.

== Career statistics ==
=== Club ===
As of match played 4 April 2026

Appearances and goals by club, season and competition
Club	Season	League			Playoff		Continental		Total	
Club	Season	Division	Apps	Goals	Apps	Goals	Apps	Goals	Apps	Goals
Houston Dash	2024	NWSL	4	0	—		—		4	0
Houston Dash	2025	NWSL	17	2	—		—		17	2
Houston Dash	2026	NWSL	4	4	—		—		4	4
Career total			25	6	0	0	0	0	25	6

=== International ===
As of match played 17 October 2026

Appearances and goals by national team and year
National team	Year	Apps	Goals
Jamaica	2022	6	1
Jamaica	2023	3	0
Jamaica	2025	5	2
Jamaica	2026	4	1
Total		18	4

Scores and results list Jamaica's goal tally first, score column indicates score after each van Zanten goal.

List of international goals scored by Kalyssa van Zanten
No.	Date	Venue	Opponent	Score	Result	Competition
1	18 July 2022	Estadio BBVA, Guadalupe, Mexico	Costa Rica	1–0	1–0 (a.e.t.)	2022 CONCACAF W Championship
2	29 November 2025	Daren Sammy Cricket Ground, Gros Islet, Saint Lucia	Dominica	3–0	18–0	2026 CONCACAF W Championship qualification
3	29 November 2025	Daren Sammy Cricket Ground, Gros Islet, Saint Lucia	Dominica	6–0	18–0	2026 CONCACAF W Championship qualification
4	13 October 2026	Estadio Corregidora, Querétaro, Mexico	Mexico	3–1	3–1	Friendly

== Honours ==
United States U15

- CONCACAF Girls' U-15 Championship: 2016

Jamaica

- CONCACAF Women's Championship third place: 2022

Individual

- NWSL Team of the Month: April 2026
