= Puerto Rico women's national under-17 football team =

Selected team of Puerto Rico football players under 17 years

Puerto Rico Women's U-17
- Nickname(s): El Huracán Azul (The Blue Hurricane); Las Boricuas (The Boricuas)
- Association: Federación Puertorriqueña de Fútbol (FPF)
- Confederation: CONCACAF (North America)
- Sub-confederation: CFU (Caribbean)
- Head coach: Andrés Mirabelli
- FIFA code: PUR
First colors	Second colors

CONCACAF Women's U-17 Championship
- Appearances: 8 (first in 2008)
- Best result: 4th place (2022)

FIFA U-17 Women's World Cup
- Appearances: 1 (first in 2026)
- Best result: Group Stage (2026)

The Puerto Rico U-17 women's national football team is the national women's under-17 football team of Puerto Rico and is managed by the Puerto Rican Football Federation. Andrés Mirabelli was named head coach in 2026.

On March 23, 2026, it was announced that Puerto Rico had secured the final berth in the FIFA U-17 Woman's World Cup, as the best runner-up across the three groups, besting Costa Rica based on total goals difference.

== Competitive record ==
=== FIFA U-17 Women's World Cup ===
Year	Round	MP	W	D*	L	GF	GA
(New Zealand) 2008	Did not qualify						
(Trinidad and Tobago) 2010	Did not qualify						
(Azerbaijan) 2012	Did not qualify						
(Costa Rica) 2014	Did not qualify						
(Jordan) 2016	Did not qualify						
(Uruguay) 2018	Did not qualify						
(India) 2022	Did not qualify						
(Dominican Republic) 2024	Did not qualify						
(Morocco) 2025	Did not qualify						
(Morocco) 2026	Group Stage	3	0	0	3	2	14
Total	1/10	3	0	0	3	2	14

*Draws include knockout matches decided on penalty shoot-out.

=== CONCACAF Women's U-17 Championship ===
Year	Round	MP	W	D*	L	GF	GA
(Trinidad and Tobago) 2008	Group stage	3	1	0	2	2	8
(Costa Rica) 2010	Did not qualify						
(Guatemala) 2012	Did not qualify						
(Jamaica) 2013	Did not qualify						
(Grenada) 2016	Did not qualify						
(Nicaragua) (United States) 2018	Group stage	2	0	0	2	1	11
(Mexico) 2020	Canceled						
(Dominican Republic) 2022	Fourth place	7	3	0	4	9	25
(Mexico) 2024	Group stage	3	0	0	3	3	12
CONCACAF U-17 Women's World Cup qualifiers
2025	Final round						
(Costa Rica) 2026	Group best runners-up						
Total	9/9	15	4	0	11	15	56

== Current Squad ==
Squad selected for 2026 FIFA U-17 Women's World Cup

No.	Pos.	Player	Date of birth (age)	Caps	Goals	Club
1	GK	Melodee Martinez	24 February 2010 (aged 16)			(United States Soccer Federation) Florida Premier
2	DF	Jaeda Russell	15 March 2010 (aged 16)			(United States Soccer Federation) Florida Premier
3	DF	Sandra Mae O’Neill	17 July 2009 (aged 17)			(United States Soccer Federation) PDA Blue
4	DF	Camila Adame	31 January 2009 (aged 17)			(United States Soccer Federation) Sporting Jax
5	DF	Camryn Smith	23 January 2009 (aged 17)			(United States Soccer Federation) Boca ECNL
6	FW	Rhaya Everts	13 January 2009 (aged 17)			(United States Soccer Federation) Florida Kraze Krush
7	MF	Zoe Melia	17 August 2009 (aged 17)			(United States Soccer Federation) FSA F.C.
8	DF	Reese Lanier	28 December 2009 (aged 16)			(United States Soccer Federation) Charlotte Independence
9	FW	Aleeya Olmo	1 January 2011 (aged 15)			(United States Soccer Federation) Penn Fusion
10	MF	Giselle Falcon	12 January 2009 (aged 17)			(United States Soccer Federation) Bethesda SC
11	FW	Caroline Rivera	9 June 2011 (aged 15)			(United States Soccer Federation) Atlanta United
12	GK	Amanda Vega Rios	1 September 2009 (aged 17)			(United States Soccer Federation) Orlando Pride
13	FW	Megan Riviera	25 July 2010 (aged 16)			(United States Soccer Federation) Concorde Fire
14	DF	Daovy Acevedo	26 August 2009 (aged 17)			(United States Soccer Federation) Florida United SC
15	DF	Isabella Sanabria-Cora	9 February 2009 (aged 17)			(United States Soccer Federation) LAFC So Cal Youth
16	DF	Zoriah Jones	26 January 2010 (aged 16)			(United States Soccer Federation) Florida Kraze Krush
17	MF	Amanda Echevarria	23 September 2009 (aged 17)			(United States Soccer Federation) Black Rock F.C.
18	GK	Victoria Moore-Torres	6 July 2009 (aged 17)			(United States Soccer Federation) Florida Kraze Krush
19	MF	Mia Colon	18 December 2009 (aged 16)			(Puerto Rican Football Federation) Puerto Rico Surf
20	MF	Selymar Centeno	19 August 2009 (aged 17)			(Puerto Rican Football Federation) CF Fraigcomar
21	MF	Amanda Quinones	12 January 2010 (aged 16)			(Puerto Rican Football Federation) Coamo FC

== Schedule and results ==
17 October 2026 U-17 2026 World Cup	North Korea	6–0	Puerto Rico	Mohammed VI Football Academy (Pitch 2), Salé
15:00	Yu Jong-hyang 6', 38'; Ri Ui-gyong 19'; Kim Won-sim 34', 50'; Ri Ye-rim 45+1'			Attendance: 259; Referee: Alejandra Quisbert (Bolivia)

20 October 2026 U-17 2026 World Cup	Nigeria	2–0	Puerto Rico	Mohammed VI Football Academy (Pitch 4), Salé
18:00	Adegbuyi 25'; Oscar 90+3'			Attendance: 231; Referee: Adriana Álvarez de Olivera (Argentina)

23 October 2026 U-17 2026 World Cup	Puerto Rico	2–6	Poland	Mohammed VI Football Academy (Pitch 2), Salé
15:00	Olmo 51', 90+1'		Leśkiewicz 3'; Burzan 11', 72' (pen.); Skrzypczak 34', 45+2'; Świtała 90+7'	Attendance: 198; Referee: Zoulaikha Harmasse (Morocco)
