= Gabriela Torres Olivares =

Mexican novelist and short story writer

Gabriela Torres Olivares (born 1982) is a Mexican novelist and short story writer.

== Biography ==
Gabriela Torres Olivares has published four books of short stories and one novel. Her fictional work deals with the body and has been described as pertaining to the modern Mexican Gothic. Aside from the books she has published, her work has been included in numerous anthologies and literary journals. Her writing has been translated into Italian, French and English, and has been published in numerous literary publications in Mexico and internationally.

From 2004 to 2005, Torres Olivares was a fellow at the Centro de Escritores de Nuevo León, and from 2015 to 2016, she was the recipient of a grant from the Programa Jóvenes Creadores from the Mexican National Endowment for Culture and the Arts / FONCA. In 2017, her novel Piscinas Verticales won the Premio Binacional de Novela Joven Frontera de Palabras|Border of words from the Secretaría de Cultura and the Tijuana Cultural Center (CECUT).

=== Books ===
- 2004 – Están Muertos, Harikiri Plaquettes (short stories)
- 2007 – Incompletario, Ediciones Intempestivas (short stories)
- 2010 – Enfermario, Fondo Editorial Tierra Adentro (short stories)
- 2017 – Enfermario, Les Figues Press, (short stories) Spanish/English bilingual edition, translation by Jennifer Donovan.
