= Mia Fishel =

American soccer player (born 2001)

- Fishel with the Seattle Reign in 2026

Personal information
- Full name: Mia Renee Fishel
- Date of birth: April 30, 2001 (age 25)
- Place of birth: San Diego, California, United States
- Height: 5 ft 7 in (1.70 m)
- Position: Forward

Team information
- Current team: Seattle Reign FC
- Number: 19

Youth career
- San Diego Surf

College career
Years	Team	Apps	(Gls)
2019–2021	UCLA Bruins	59	(32)

Senior career*
Years	Team	Apps	(Gls)
2022–2023	Tigres UANL	48	(38)
2023–2025	Chelsea	14	(2)
2025–	Seattle Reign	37	(3)

International career^{‡}
2015–2016	United States U15		
2017–2018	United States U17	22	(6)
2020	United States U20	6	(13)
2025–	United States U23	2	(0)
2023–	United States	3	(1)
- * Club domestic league appearances and goals as of 16:32, November 8, 2026 (UTC) ‡ National team caps and goals as of June 2, 2025

Mia Renee Fishel (born April 30, 2001) is an American professional soccer player who plays as a forward for Seattle Reign FC of the National Women's Soccer League (NWSL) and the United States national team.

Fishel played college soccer for the UCLA Bruins, earning All-American honors twice. She was drafted fifth overall in the 2022 NWSL Draft by the Orlando Pride, but instead chose to sign with Liga MX Femenil club Tigres UANL, becoming the first foreign player to win the Mexican league scoring title. In 2023, she joined Women's Super League club Chelsea, but an anterior cruciate ligament injury significantly limited her playing time there. In 2025, she signed a five-year contract with Seattle.

Internationally, Fishel represented the United States at under-15, under-17 and under-20 level, winning CONCACAF tournaments with each. She debuted for the senior national team in 2023.

== Early life ==
Born in San Diego, California, Fishel attended Patrick Henry High School and played two years of high school soccer as well as basketball. She was first-team All-CIF in soccer as a sophomore. Fishel played club soccer with ECNL team San Diego Surf SC.

== College career ==
Fishel played three seasons of college soccer for the UCLA Bruins at the University of California, Los Angeles between 2019 and 2021 while majoring in psychology. As a freshman, Fishel appeared in all 24 games and led the Bruins in scoring with 14 goals including five in the postseason as UCLA reached the College Cup semi-finals before losing to Stanford. She ranked third among freshman in the nation in goals scored and earned Pac-12 All-Freshman Team and All-Pac-12 third-team honors.

In 2020, Fishel ranked second in goals for the Bruins with six and tied for the team lead with six assists as the Bruins won the Pac-12 title for the first time since 2014. Fishel earned All-Pacific Region first-team and All-American second-team selections by the United Soccer Coaches as well as All-Pac-12 first-team honors.

Ahead of her junior year, Fishel announced she would be declaring early for the 2022 NWSL Draft at the end of the season. UCLA went unbeaten on the season, retaining the Pac-12 championship before the team's 26-match unbeaten streak was ended by a 1–0 defeat in an upset to unranked UC Irvine in the first round of the NCAA Tournament having been ranked #3 nationally. Fishel led the team in goals with 12 in her final season and earned her second consecutive United Soccer Coaches All-America honor, being selected to the third-team. She was also first-team All-Pacific Region and All-Pac-12 for the second time.

== Club career ==
=== Tigres UANL ===
On December 18, 2021, Fishel was selected in the first round (5th overall) of the 2022 NWSL Draft by Orlando Pride having opted to declare early and forgo her senior year. Her head coach at UCLA, Amanda Cromwell, had been appointed Orlando head coach earlier that month. However, on January 14, 2022, she instead opted to sign outside of the NWSL with Mexican Liga MX team Tigres UANL. Critical of the draft system, she stated she had turned down Orlando because she did not want to be part of a rebuilding team and Tigres offered the chance of championships. She made her debut on January 31 as a 65th-minute substitute in a 1–1 draw with Tijuana during the 2022 Clausura. Four days later she made her first start and scored twice in a 4–2 win away to Mazatlán. Fishel scored 17 goals in 17 appearances during the 2022 Apertura, becoming the first foreign player to win the Liga MX Femenil golden boot. She beat Christina Burkenroad by one goal.

=== Chelsea ===
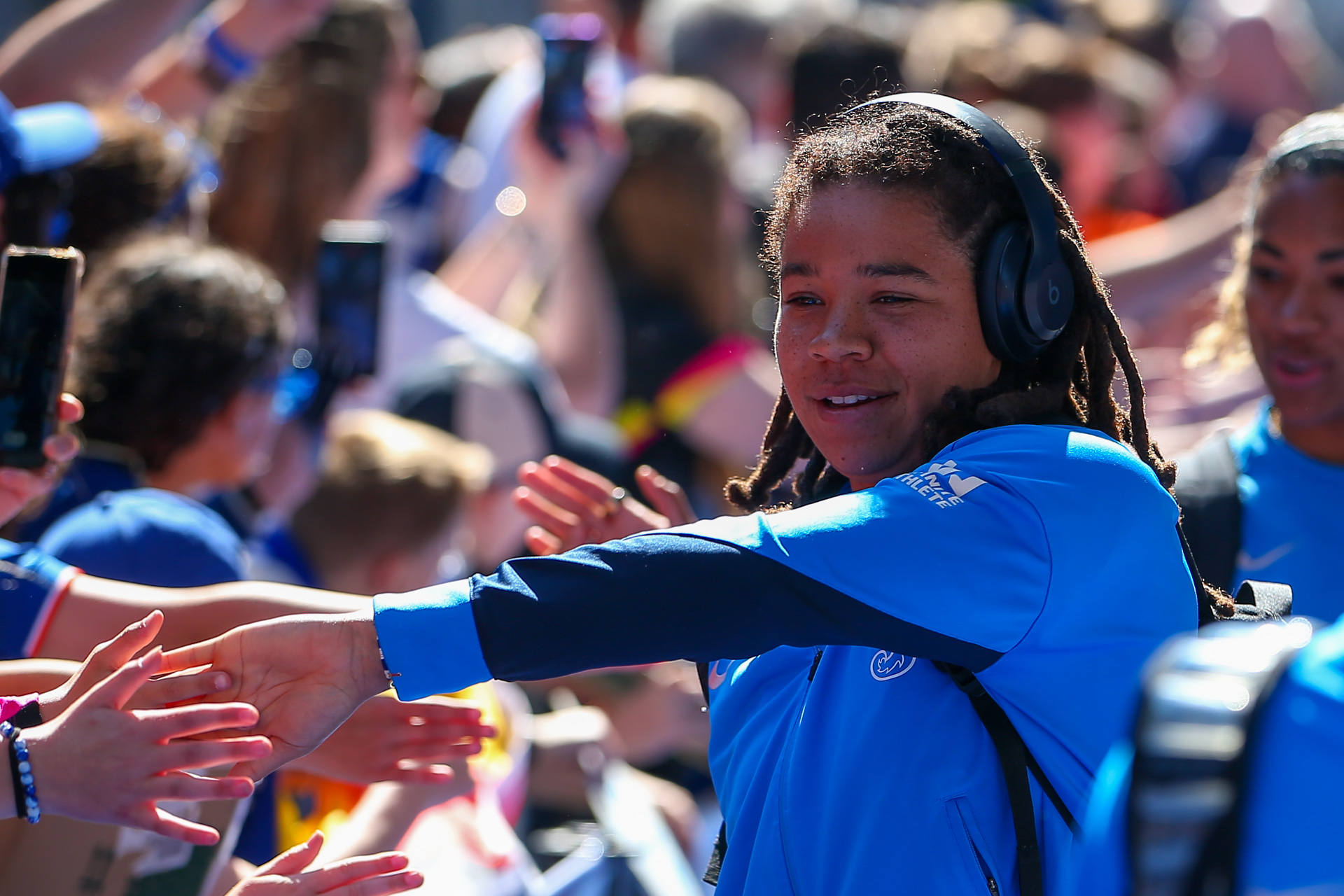
Fishel with Chelsea in 2025

On August 4, 2023, English Women's Super League club Chelsea announced the signing of Fishel from Tigres on a three-year contract. Chelsea reportedly paid a $250,000 transfer fee. On October 1, 2023, Fishel made her Chelsea debut in a Women's Super League match against Tottenham Hotspur and scored her first goal for the club in the 28th minute in a 2–1 victory.

After suffering an anterior cruciate ligament injury while on international duty in February 2024, Fishel made her return to the pitch as a substitute in Chelsea's 2–1 victory against Manchester City on March 23, 2025.

=== Seattle Reign ===
On July 10, 2025, Seattle Reign FC announced that they had signed Fishel through the 2029 National Women's Soccer League season. Fishel made her NWSL debut on August 1, 2025, coming in as an 80th-minute substitute in a 2–0 win over Angel City FC.

On July 18, 2026, over a year after having signed for Seattle, Fishel netted her first NWSL goal, opening the scoring in an eventual defeat to Gotham FC.

== International career ==
=== Youth ===
Fishel has represented the United States at under-15, under-17 and under-20 level. In 2016, Fishel was part of the winning team at the 2016 CONCACAF Girls' U-15 Championship and was individually named player of the tournament having scored seven goals. In 2018, she was part of the squad that won the 2018 CONCACAF Women's U-17 Championship, scoring in a group stage victory over Bermuda and again in the semi-final against Haiti. The result qualified the team for the 2018 FIFA U-17 Women's World Cup where Fishel scored the opening goal in a group stage win over Cameroon, the United States' only win as the team was eliminated as bottom of the group. In 2020, Fishel won her third regional youth title as part of the winning squad at the 2020 CONCACAF Women's U-20 Championship. She scored a new all-ages national-record 13 goals including two in a 4–1 win over Mexico in the final but finished second in the golden boot race by one goal behind Haiti's Melchie Dumornay. She was, however, voted player of the tournament. She was a finalist for U.S. Soccer Young Female Player of the Year 2020 alongside Trinity Rodman and eventual winner Naomi Girma.

=== Senior ===
In October 2020, Fishel received her first United States senior call-up by Vlatko Andonovski for a 27-player 11 day training camp in Commerce City, Colorado. The camp was the first in seven months as a result of the COVID-19 pandemic and included four college players with Fishel being the youngest. Fishel received her second call-up for the senior team in September 2023 for a set of friendlies against South Africa and subsequently made her senior team debut in the second match against South Africa on September 24, 2023. On October 29, 2023, in her hometown of San Diego, Fishel scored her first goal for the national team in her second appearance, a friendly against Colombia which finished 3–0. On February 19, 2024, Fishel tore the anterior cruciate ligament in her right knee while training for the 2024 CONCACAF W Gold Cup.

== Personal life ==
Fishel's uncles, Andrew and David Bascome, both played international soccer for the Bermuda national team. Andrew's daughter, Druw Bascome, is Fishel's cousin. The two played against each other when the United States met Bermuda at the 2018 CONCACAF Women's U-17 Championship.

Fishel published a children's book, Big Fish, in late 2024.

== Career statistics ==
=== College ===
School	Season	Division	Apps	Goals
UCLA Bruins	2019	Div. I	24	14
UCLA Bruins	2020–21	Div. I	16	6
UCLA Bruins	2021	Div. I	19	12
Career total			59	32

=== Club ===
As of November 7, 2025

Club	Season	League			National Cup (Note: Includes Women's FA Cup)		League Cup (Note: Includes FA Women's League Cup)		Continental (Note: Includes UEFA Women's Champions League)		Playoffs		Other		Total	
Club	Season	Division	Apps	Goals	Apps	Goals	Apps	Goals	Apps	Goals	Apps	Goals	Apps	Goals	Apps	Goals
Tigres UANL	2021–22	Liga MX	14	8	—		—		—		4	4	—		18	12
Tigres UANL	2022–23	Liga MX	34	30	—		—		—		10	3	2 (Note: 2023 Campeón de Campeones)	2	46	35
Tigres UANL	Total		48	38	0	0	0	0	0	0	14	7	2	2	64	47
Chelsea	2023–24	WSL	10	1	1	1	1	0	5	1	—		—		17	3
Chelsea	2024–25	WSL	4	1	0	0	0	0	0	0	—		—		4	1
Chelsea	Total		14	2	1	1	1	0	5	1	0	0	0	0	21	4
Seattle Reign FC	2025	NWSL	11	0	—		—		—		1	0	—		12	0
Career total			73	40	1	1	1	0	5	1	15	7	2	2	97	51

=== International ===
As of match played December 2, 2023

National Team	Year	Apps	Goals
United States	2023	3	1
Total		3	1

=== International goals ===
United States score listed first, score column indicates score after each Fishel goal.

No.	Date	Cap	Venue	Opponent	Score	Result	Competition
1	October 29, 2023	2	Snapdragon Stadium, San Diego, California, United States	Colombia	1–0	3–0	Friendly

== Honors ==
UCLA Bruins

- Pac-12 Conference regular season: 2020, 2021

Tigres UANL

- Liga MX: 2022 Apertura
- Campeón de Campeones: 2023

Chelsea

- Women's Super League: 2023–24, 2024–25
- Women's FA Cup: 2024–25
- FA Women's League Cup: 2024–25

International

- CONCACAF Girls' Under-15 Championship: 2016
- CONCACAF Women's U-17 Championship: 2018
- CONCACAF Women's U-20 Championship: 2020

Individual

- CONCACAF Girls' Under-15 Championship Golden Ball: 2016
- CONCACAF Girls' Under-15 Championship Best XI: 2016
- CONCACAF Women's U-20 Championship Golden Ball: 2020
- Liga MX Golden Boot: 2022 Apertura
