= Maya Doms =

American soccer player (born 2001)

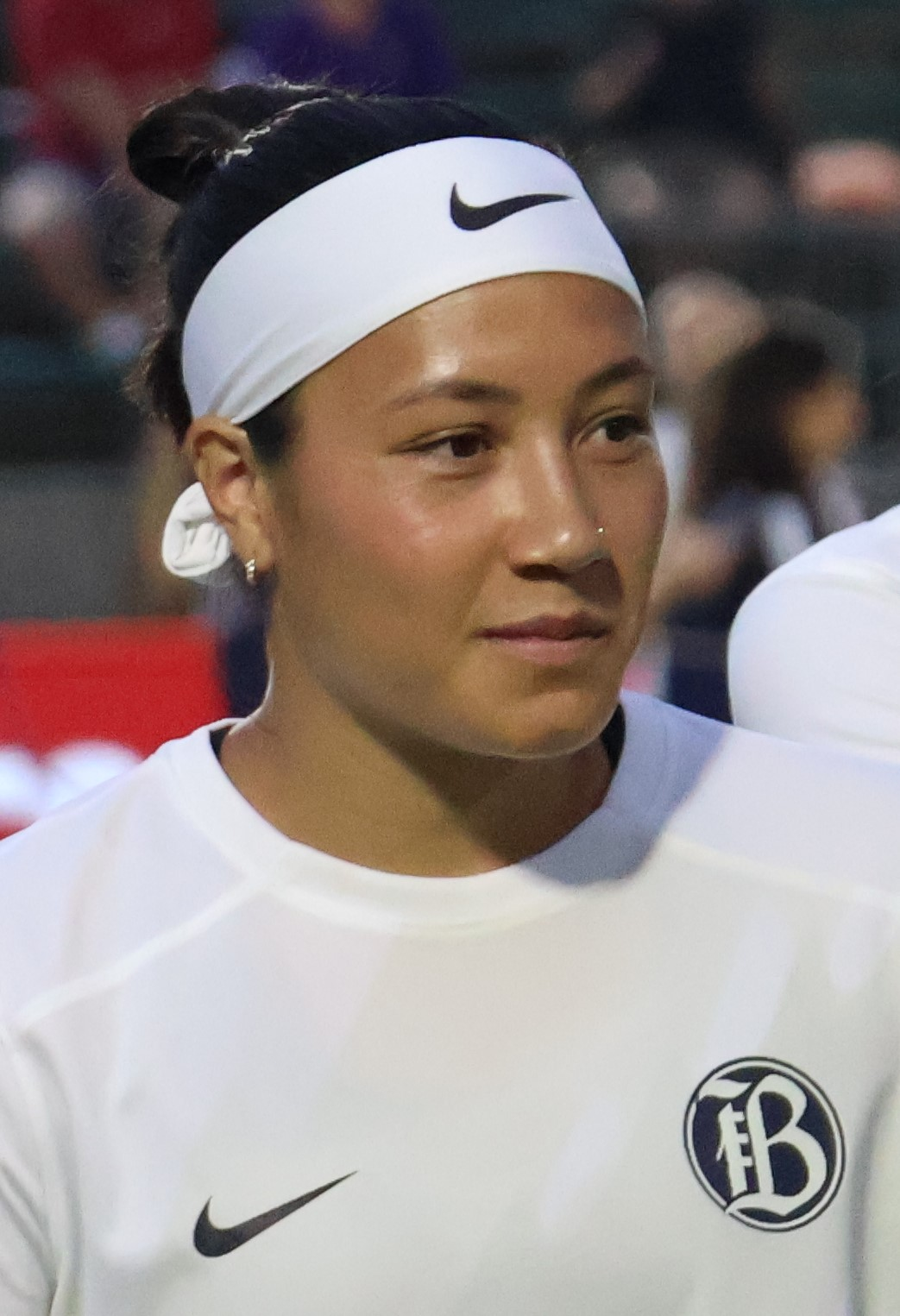
- Doms with Bay FC in 2024

Personal information
- Full name: Maya Loren Doms
- Date of birth: May 11, 2001 (age 25)
- Place of birth: Davis, California, U.S.
- Height: 5 ft 6 in (1.68 m)
- Position: Midfielder

Team information
- Current team: AS Roma

College career
Years	Team	Apps	(Gls)
2019–2023	Stanford Cardinal	100	(33)

Senior career*
Years	Team	Apps	(Gls)
2024	Bay FC	1	(0)
2025–2026	Sassuolo	25	(1)
2026–	AS Roma	0	(0)

International career
2017–2018	United States U17		
2019	United States U20		
- * Club domestic league appearances and goals as of 15:16, July 28, 2026 (UTC)

Maya Loren Doms (born May 11, 2001) is an American professional soccer player who plays as a midfielder for Serie A club AS Roma. She played college soccer for the Stanford Cardinal before being drafted eighth overall by Bay FC in the 2024 NWSL Draft. She has also previously played for Sassuolo.

== Early life ==
The daughter of Clariza and Rocky Doms, Doms also played golf and basketball for Davis High School. She chose to focus on soccer after receiving invites from regional teams. Doms has a twin brother. She also played with local boys teams and Women's Premier Soccer League teams.

== College career ==
Doms played collegiate soccer for the Stanford Cardinal and helped the team win the 2019 NCAA College Cup. From 2019 to 2023, Doms played in 100 games (84 starts), tallying 33 goals and 20 assists. As a 5th year senior and team captain, Doms was a first team All-American, All-Region, and All-Pac 12 pick, recording 12 goals and six assists while leading the Cardinal to the 2023 Women's College Cup Final.

== Club career ==
Doms was selected eighth overall in the 2024 NWSL Draft by expansion team Bay FC. On February 20, 2024, she scored her first goal with a professional club, the first in Bay FC history, during a preseason match against San Diego Wave FC at the 2024 Coachella Valley Invitational. Doms made her professional debut on May 1, 2024, coming on in the 76th minute for Joelle Anderson, in Bay FC's home game against Portland Thorns FC at PayPal Park. On December 10, 2024, Bay FC announced that Doms would not return to the club in 2025.

On February 10, 2025, Doms was signed by Italian club Sassuolo. She spent one-and-a-half seasons with the club, making 25 appearances in the Serie A.

In July 2026, Doms joined fellow Serie A side AS Roma on a three-year deal until 2029.

== International career ==
Doms has played for several U.S. women's national youth teams, including U-23 and U-17. She scored the winning goal for the U.S. against Mexico in the final of the 2018 CONCACAF Women's U-17 Championship.

Doms is Filipino-American, through her mother, and currently is eligible to represent both the US and the Philippines at senior level. Doms said that she has been contacted by the Philippines team and would consider it if she was unlikely to be picked to play for the US senior team.
