= 2018 CONCACAF Women's U-17 Championship =

CONCACAF CAMPEONATO FEMENINO SUB-17 NICARAGUA 2018 (initially) Concacaf WOMEN'S UNDER-17 CHAMPIONSHIP USA 2018 (subsequently)

Tournament details
- Host countries: Nicaragua; United States
- Dates: 19 – 21 April (some matches); 6 – 12 June (rest of the tournament)
- Teams: 8
- Venue: 2 (in 2 host cities)

Final positions
- Champions: United States (4th title)
- Runners-up: Mexico
- Third place: Canada
- Fourth place: Haiti

Tournament statistics
- Matches played: 15
- Goals scored: 69 (4.6 per match)
- Top scorer(s): (Haiti) Melchie Dumornay (Mexico) Alison González (United States) Sunshine Fontes (5 goals each)
- Best player: (Haiti) Melchie Dumornay
- Best goalkeeper: (United States) Angelina Anderson
- Fair play award: United States

The 2018 CONCACAF Women's U-17 Championship was the 6th edition of the CONCACAF Women's U-17 Championship, the biennial international youth football championship organized by CONCACAF for the women's under-17 national teams of the North, Central American and Caribbean region. The tournament was initially to be hosted by Nicaragua, and was planned to take place between 19 – 29 April 2018, as announced by CONCACAF on 5 December 2017. A total of eight teams participated in the tournament.

On 22 April 2018, four days into the tournament, CONCACAF announced the remainder of the championship was cancelled immediately due to security concerns caused by civil unrest in Nicaragua. On 11 May 2018, CONCACAF announced the tournament would resume play on 6 June and conclude on 12 June 2018, with the remainder of the tournament hosted at the IMG Academy in Bradenton, Florida, United States. Six teams played in the remainder of the tournament, as Nicaragua and Puerto Rico were already eliminated and were set to face each other in their last match.

The top three teams of the tournament qualified for the 2018 FIFA U-17 Women's World Cup in Uruguay as the CONCACAF representatives.

Defending champions United States won their fourth title, after defeated Mexico in the final.

== Qualification ==
Regional qualification tournaments were held to determine the teams playing in the final tournament.

=== Qualified teams ===
The following eight teams qualified for the final tournament.

Team	Qualification	Appearance	Previous best performances	Previous FIFA U-17 Women's World Cup appearances
North American Zone (NAFU)
Canada	Automatic	6th	Champions (2010)	5
Mexico	Automatic	6th	Champions (2013)	4
United States	Automatic	6th	Champions (2008, 2012, 2016)	3
Central American Zone (UNCAF) qualified through Central American qualifying competition
Nicaragua	Hosts	1st	Debut	0
Costa Rica	Group stage winners	4th	Runners-up (2008)	2
Caribbean Zone (CFU) qualified through Caribbean qualifying competition
Haiti	Final round winners	4th	Fourth place (2016)	0
Bermuda	Final round runners-up	1st	Debut	0
Puerto Rico	Final round third place	2nd	Group stage (2008)	0

== Venues ==
All matches of the original tournament in Nicaragua were played at Nicaragua National Football Stadium in Managua. All matches of the rescheduled tournament in the United States were played at IMG Academy in Bradenton, Florida.

== Draw ==
The draw of the tournament was held on 31 January 2018, 15:00 EST (UTC−5), at the CONCACAF Headquarters in Miami, Florida, United States.

The eight teams were drawn into two groups of four teams. Tournament hosts Nicaragua were seeded in position A1, while defending champions United States were seeded in position B1. The remaining six teams were allocated to pots 2–3, and drawn to the remaining six positions.

Pot 1	Pot 2	Pot 3
Nicaragua (Position A1); United States (Position B1)	Canada; Mexico	Bermuda; Costa Rica; Haiti; Puerto Rico

== Squads ==
Players born on or after 1 January 2001 are eligible to compete in the tournament. Each team must register a squad of 20 players, two of whom must be goalkeepers (Regulations Articles 15.C.2).

== Group stage ==
The top two teams of each group advance to the semi-finals.

Tiebreakers

Teams are ranked according to points (3 points for a win, 1 point for a draw, 0 points for a loss), and if tied on points, the following tiebreaking criteria are applied, in the order given, to determine the rankings (Regulations Article 18.A.5):

1. Points in head-to-head matches among tied teams;
2. Goal difference in head-to-head matches among tied teams;
3. Goals scored in head-to-head matches among tied teams;
4. Goal difference in all group matches;
5. Goals scored in all group matches;
6. Drawing of lots.

All times are local, CST (UTC−6) for Nicaragua and EDT (UTC−4) for the United States.

=== Group A ===
Pos	Team	Pld	W	D	L	GF	GA	GD	Pts	Qualification
1	Mexico	3	2	1	0	16	1	+15	7	Knockout stage
2	Haiti	3	2	1	0	7	2	+5	7	Knockout stage
3	Puerto Rico	2	0	0	2	1	11	−10	0	
4	Nicaragua (H)	2	0	0	2	0	10	−10	0	

Source: CONCACAF
Rules for classification: Group stage tiebreakers
(H) Hosts
19 April 2018
17:30

Puerto Rico	1–4	Haiti
Cacho 69'	Report	Surpris 25', 57', 81'; Dumornay 42'

Nicaragua National Football Stadium, Managua
Referee: Marianela Araya (Costa Rica)
19 April 2018
20:00

Nicaragua	0–8	Mexico
	Report	Pérez 10'; Díaz 16'; Mauleón 34', 43'; González 45+1', 73'; Avilez 61'; Reyes 66'

Nicaragua National Football Stadium, Managua
Referee: Maurees Skeete (Guyana)

21 April 2018
17:30

Mexico	7–0	Puerto Rico
Díaz 22'; Mauleón 56', 64'; Buso 69'; González 84', 86'; Avilez 89'	Report

Nicaragua National Football Stadium, Managua
Referee: Marianela Araya (Costa Rica)
21 April 2018
20:00

Nicaragua	0–2	Haiti
	Report	Dumornay 29'; V. Roblero 45+1' (o.g.)

Nicaragua National Football Stadium, Managua
Referee: Karen Abt (United States)

8 June 2018
10:00

Mexico	1–1	Haiti
González 23' (pen.)	Report	Pierre 19'

IMG Academy, Bradenton, Florida
Referee: Melissa Borjas (Honduras)

Nicaragua	Cancelled	Puerto Rico
	Report

=== Group B ===
Pos	Team	Pld	W	D	L	GF	GA	GD	Pts	Qualification
1	United States (H)	3	3	0	0	15	1	+14	9	Knockout stage
2	Canada	3	2	0	1	5	2	+3	6	Knockout stage
3	Costa Rica	3	1	0	2	7	7	0	3	
4	Bermuda	3	0	0	3	2	19	−17	0	

Source: CONCACAF
Rules for classification: Group stage tiebreakers
(H) Hosts
20 April 2018
17:30

Canada	3–0	Bermuda
Riviere 40'; Novak 63', 81'	Report

Nicaragua National Football Stadium, Managua
Referee: Sandra Benítez (El Salvador)
20 April 2018
20:00

United States	4–0	Costa Rica
Umaña 4' (o.g.); Linnehan 15'; Wesley 60'; Jones 79'	Report

Nicaragua National Football Stadium, Managua
Attendance: 160
Referee: Odette Hamilton (Jamaica)

6 June 2018
14:45

Costa Rica	1–2	Canada
Salas 86'	Report	Williams 18', 51'

IMG Academy, Bradenton, Florida
Referee: Quetzalli Alvarado (Mexico)
6 June 2018
17:00

United States	10–1	Bermuda
Fishel 6'; Ordoñez 25'; Doms 32', 48'; Turner 41'; Kroeger 44'; Morris 47'; Wheeler 85'; Fontes 86', 90'	Report	Nesbeth 17'

IMG Academy, Bradenton, Florida
Attendance: 480
Referee: Ronide Henrius (Haiti)

8 June 2018
14:45

Costa Rica	6–1	Bermuda
Marín 14'; Chinchilla 21', 56'; Salas 39', 90+2'; Contreras 90+9' (pen.)	Report	Hill 90+5'

IMG Academy, Bradenton, Florida
Referee: Cecile Hinds (Trinidad and Tobago)
8 June 2018
17:00

United States	1–0	Canada
Turner 65'	Report

IMG Academy, Bradenton, Florida
Attendance: 380
Referee: Miriam León (El Salvador)

== Knockout stage ==
In the semi-finals, if the match is level at the end of 90 minutes, no extra time is played and the match is decided by a penalty shoot-out. In the third place match and final, if the match is level at the end of 90 minutes, extra time is played, and if still tied after extra time, the match is decided by a penalty shoot-out (Regulations Articles 11.C and 11.D).

=== Bracket ===
Semi-finals
10 June – Bradenton, FL
Mexico	2
Canada	1
10 June – Bradenton, FL
United States	3
Haiti	2

Final
12 June – Bradenton, FL
Mexico	2
United States	3
Third place
12 June – Bradenton, FL
Canada	2
Haiti	1

=== Semi-finals ===
Winners qualify for 2018 FIFA U-17 Women's World Cup.

10 June 2018
10:30

Mexico	2–1	Canada
Vázquez 6'; Pérez 45+2' (pen.)	Report	Akindoju 37'

IMG Academy, Bradenton, Florida
Referee: Cecile Hinds (Trinidad and Tobago)

10 June 2018
17:00

United States	3–2	Haiti
Fontes 32', 50'; Fishel 49'	Report	Dumornay 14', 90+3'

IMG Academy, Bradenton, Florida
Attendance: 377
Referee: Marianela Araya (Costa Rica)

=== Third place match ===
Winner qualifies for 2018 FIFA U-17 Women's World Cup.

12 June 2018
10:00

Canada	2–1	Haiti
Huitema 48'; Williams 89'	Report	Dumornay 75' (pen.)

IMG Academy, Bradenton, Florida
Referee: Miriam León (El Salvador)

=== Final ===
12 June 2018
18:00 (Note: The final was delayed from 16:30 to 18:00 due to inclement weather.)

Mexico	2–3	United States
Pérez 32' (pen.); Díaz 45'	Report	Bebar 34'; Fontes 46'; Doms 76'

IMG Academy, Bradenton, Florida
Referee: Melissa Borjas (Honduras)

== Winners ==
2018 CONCACAF Women's U-17 Championship winners

United States
4th title

== Qualified teams for FIFA U-17 Women's World Cup ==
The following three teams from CONCACAF qualified for the 2018 FIFA U-17 Women's World Cup.

Team	Qualified on	Previous appearances in FIFA U-17 Women's World Cup^{1}
United States	10 June 2018	3 (2008, 2012, 2016)
Mexico	10 June 2018	4 (2010, 2012, 2014, 2016)
Canada	12 June 2018	5 (2008, 2010, 2012, 2014, 2016)

^{1} Bold indicates champions for that year. Italic indicates hosts for that year.

== Goalscorers ==
5 goals

- (Haiti) Melchie Dumornay
- (Mexico) Alison González
- (United States) Sunshine Fontes

4 goals

- (Mexico) Natalia Mauleón

3 goals

- (Canada) Andersen Williams
- (Costa Rica) María Paula Salas
- (Haiti) Flero Surpris
- (Mexico) Nayeli Díaz
- (Mexico) Nicole Pérez
- (United States) Maya Doms

2 goals

- (Canada) Kaila Novak
- (Costa Rica) Priscila Chinchilla
- (Mexico) Aylín Avilez
- (United States) Mia Fishel
- (United States) Reilyn Turner

1 goal

- (Bermuda) Jadae Steede Hill
- (Bermuda) Leilanni Nesbeth
- (Canada) Teni Akindoju
- (Canada) Jordyn Huitema
- (Canada) Jayde Riviere
- (Costa Rica) Daniela Contreras
- (Costa Rica) Carmen Marín
- (Haiti) Milan Pierre
- (Mexico) Vanessa Buso
- (Mexico) Reyna Reyes
- (Mexico) Anette Vázquez
- (Puerto Rico) Isabel Cacho
- (United States) Hannah Bebar
- (United States) Sophia Jones
- (United States) Samantha Kroeger
- (United States) Payton Linnehan
- (United States) Makenna Morris
- (United States) Diana Ordoñez
- (United States) Kennedy Wesley
- (United States) Astrid Wheeler

1 own goal

- (Costa Rica) Jeimy Umaña (against the United States)
- (Nicaragua) Valeria Roblero (against Haiti)

== Awards ==
The following awards were given at the conclusion of the tournament.

Golden Ball	Golden Boot	Golden Glove
(Haiti) Melchie Dumornay	(Mexico) Alison González	(United States) Angelina Anderson
CONCACAF Fair Play Award
United States

Best XI

- Goalkeeper: (United States) Angelina Anderson
- Right Back: (Mexico) Reyna Reyes
- Center Back: (United States) Kennedy Wesley
- Center Back: (Mexico) Tanna Sánchez
- Left Back: (United States) Kate Wiesner
- Center Midfielder: (United States) Sophia Jones
- Center Midfielder: (Haiti) Melchie Dumornay
- Center Midfielder: (Mexico) Nicole Pérez
- Winger/Right Midfielder: (United States) Samantha Meza
- Winger/Left Midfielder: (Mexico) Natalia Mauleón
- Forward: (United States) Sunshine Fontes
