= 2020 CONCACAF Women's U-20 Championship squads =

List of the squads for the 2020 CONCACAF Women's U-20 Championship

This is a list of the squads for the 2020 CONCACAF Women's U-20 Championship in Dominican Republic between February 22 and March 8, 2020. The 16 national teams involved in the tournament were required to register a squad of 20 players each; only players in these squads were eligible to take part in the tournament.

The CONCACAF Women's U-20 Championship is a biennial international youth football championship organized by CONCACAF for the women's under-20 national teams of the North, Central American and Caribbean region.

[In the following list, players marked (c) were named as captain for their national squad]

== Group C ==
=== Cuba ===
Coach: (Cuba) Edelsio Griego

No.	Pos.	Player	Date of birth (age)	Club
1	GK	Elika Acea	4 June 2003 (aged 16)	(Football Association of Cuba) (unknown)
12	GK	Alianne Matamoro	19 January 2000 (aged 20)	(Football Association of Cuba) (unknown)
2	DF	Maday López	29 August 2001 (aged 18)	(Football Association of Cuba) (unknown)
3	DF	Yerly Palma	14 March 2002 (aged 17)	(Football Association of Cuba) (unknown)
4	DF	Yusnelvis Espinosa	14 February 2000 (aged 20)	(Football Association of Cuba) (unknown)
5	DF	Yaniuvis Suárez	31 March 2001 (aged 18)	(Football Association of Cuba) (unknown)
6	DF	Analía Céspedes	14 September 2001 (aged 18)	(Football Association of Cuba) (unknown)
15	DF	Yeisika Hernández	7 November 2002 (aged 17)	(Football Association of Cuba) (unknown)
10	MF	Lucy Cruz	21 June 2001 (aged 18)	(Football Association of Cuba) (unknown)
14	MF	María Álvarez	28 March 2000 (aged 19)	(Football Association of Cuba) (unknown)
16	MF	Claudia Prats	28 January 2000 (aged 20)	(Football Association of Cuba) (unknown)
20	MF	Lisyanis Cruz	9 February 2001 (aged 19)	(Football Association of Cuba) (unknown)
7	FW	Maristania Mengana	5 February 2000 (aged 20)	(Football Association of Cuba) (unknown)
8	FW	Cecil Aldana	17 September 2003 (aged 16)	(Football Association of Cuba) (unknown)
9	FW	Katheryn Rodríguez	10 September 2002 (aged 17)	(Football Association of Cuba) (unknown)
11	FW	Eliane Valdez	19 July 2001 (aged 18)	(Football Association of Cuba) (unknown)
13	FW	Yedasy Góngora	24 May 2001 (aged 18)	(Football Association of Cuba) (unknown)
17	FW	Ismelis del Toro	7 April 2001 (aged 18)	(Football Association of Cuba) (unknown)
18	FW	Eunises Núñez	24 January 2000 (aged 20)	(Football Association of Cuba) (unknown)
19	FW	Gianna Borrego	7 October 2000 (aged 19)	(Football Association of Cuba) (unknown)

=== Dominican Republic ===
Coach: (Dominican Republic) Diego Gutiérrez

No.	Pos.	Player	Date of birth (age)	Club
1	GK	Claudia Torres	28 February 2000 (aged 19)	(United States Soccer Federation) Bridgeport Purple Knights
12	GK	Nayelis López	5 February 2001 (aged 19)	(Dominican Football Federation) Academia 5 de Abril
2	DF	Lynette Ureña	27 June 2000 (aged 19)	(United States Soccer Federation) Delaware State Hornets
4	DF	Gabriella Marte	27 January 2003 (aged 17)	(United States Soccer Federation) Penn Fusion Soccer Academy
6	DF	Alicia Victoria	25 March 2002 (aged 17)	(United States Soccer Federation) Broward College
13	DF	Nadia Colón	8 September 2002 (aged 17)	Unattached
14	DF	Giovanna Dionicio	20 September 2001 (aged 18)	(United States Soccer Federation) Yale Bulldogs
20	DF	Alexa Pacheco	6 November 2002 (aged 17)	(Dominican Football Federation) Delfines del Este FC
3	MF	Carmen Lorenzo	16 January 2001 (aged 19)	(Dominican Football Federation) Academia 5 de Abril
5	MF	Brieana Hallo	30 October 2003 (aged 16)	(United States Soccer Federation) Coastal Atlantic FC
7	FW	Mía Asenjo	7 March 2003 (aged 16)	(United States Soccer Federation) Susa FC
8	MF	Nicole de Jesús	11 January 2000 (aged 20)	(Dominican Football Federation) UNPHU
10	MF	Marianelys Pérez	15 April 2002 (aged 17)	(Dominican Football Federation) Academia 5 de Abril
9	FW	Kristina García	20 February 2003 (aged 17)	Unattached
11	FW	Alyssa Oviedo (C)	18 August 2000 (aged 19)	(United States Soccer Federation) Vermont Catamounts
15	FW	Stefany Espinal	9 January 2004 (aged 16)	(Dominican Football Federation) Cibao FC
16	FW	Dahien Cabrera	15 August 2000 (aged 19)	(Dominican Football Federation) Cibao FC
17	FW	Dayarí Balbuena	12 February 2000 (aged 20)	(Dominican Football Federation) Cibao FC
18	FW	Jazlyn Oviedo	25 March 2002 (aged 17)	(United States Soccer Federation) Monmouth Hawks
19	FW	Liliane Clase	29 July 2003 (aged 16)	(Dominican Football Federation) Delfines del Este FC

=== Honduras ===
Coach: Miguel Escalante

No.	Pos.	Player	Date of birth (age)	Club
1	GK	Linda Reyes	20 July 2004 (aged 15)	
12	GK	Isabella Ríos	27 February 2000 (aged 19)	
2	DF	Cesia Ulloa	14 October 2003 (aged 16)	
3	DF	Perla Moreno	3 August 2004 (aged 15)	
5	DF	Bessy Díaz	17 July 2002 (aged 17)	
6	DF	Sindy Flores	9 September 2001 (aged 18)	
9	DF	Vivian Flores	21 April 2002 (aged 17)	
14	DF	Ailen Escoto	8 November 2001 (aged 18)	
15	DF	Reyna Pereira	2 March 2002 (aged 17)	
20	DF	Josselyn Fuentes	26 May 2001 (aged 18)	
4	MF	Giselle Guzmán	7 August 2000 (aged 19)	
7	MF	Emelly Chicas	10 November 2004 (aged 15)	
8	MF	Josselin Irías	18 August 2000 (aged 19)	
16	MF	Dileyla Rodas	12 July 2004 (aged 15)	
17	MF	Jennifer Castro	27 March 2001 (aged 18)	
19	MF	Kerlyn de la O	13 November 2001 (aged 18)	
10	FW	Maylin Menjivar	28 March 2003 (aged 16)	
11	FW	Débora Tobías	2 May 2000 (aged 19)	
13	FW	Marcela Santos	24 January 2000 (aged 20)	
18	FW	Ana Valladares	20 January 2003 (aged 17)	

=== United States ===
Coach: (England) Laura Harvey

No.	Pos.	Player	Date of birth (age)	Caps	Goals	Club
1	GK	Julia Dohle	6 February 2001 (aged 19)	6	0	(United States Soccer Federation) Penn State Nittany Lions
12	GK	Claudia Dickey	6 January 2000 (aged 20)	0	0	(United States Soccer Federation) North Carolina Tar Heels
2	DF	Brianna Martinez	22 April 2000 (aged 19)	4	0	(United States Soccer Federation) Notre Dame Fighting Irish
3	DF	Emily Mason	23 October 2002 (aged 17)	2	0	(United States Soccer Federation) PDA
4	DF	Sierra Enge	23 February 2000 (aged 19)	0	0	(United States Soccer Federation) Stanford Cardinal
5	DF	Naomi Girma	14 June 2000 (aged 19)	25	0	(United States Soccer Federation) Stanford Cardinal
13	DF	Shae Holmes	8 March 2000 (aged 19)	2	0	(United States Soccer Federation) Washington Huskies
14	DF	Maycee Bell	18 September 2000 (aged 19)	4	1	(United States Soccer Federation) North Carolina Tar Heels
15	DF	Kennedy Wesley	8 March 2001 (aged 18)	0	0	(United States Soccer Federation) Stanford Cardinal
6	MF	Brianna Pinto	24 May 2000 (aged 19)	32	4	(United States Soccer Federation) North Carolina Tar Heels
7	MF	Summer Yates	17 June 2000 (aged 19)	4	2	(United States Soccer Federation) Washington Huskies
10	MF	Jenna Nighswonger	28 November 2000 (aged 19)	4	1	(United States Soccer Federation) Florida State Seminoles
17	MF	Alexa Spaanstra	1 February 2000 (aged 20)	13	2	(United States Soccer Federation) Virginia Cavaliers
18	MF	Katelyn Duong	27 March 2001 (aged 18)	3	0	(United States Soccer Federation) Minnesota Golden Gophers
20	MF	Talia DellaPeruta	19 April 2002 (aged 17)	4	0	(German Football Association) 1. FC Köln
8	FW	Trinity Rodman	20 May 2002 (aged 17)	2	1	(United States Soccer Federation) So Cal Blues SC
9	FW	Mia Fishel	30 April 2001 (aged 18)	0	0	(United States Soccer Federation) UCLA Bruins
11	FW	Sophia Smith	10 August 2000 (aged 19)	27	23	(United States Soccer Federation) Portland Thorns
16	FW	Rebecca Jarrett	13 April 2000 (aged 19)	5	0	(United States Soccer Federation) Virginia Cavaliers
19	FW	Samantha Meza	7 November 2001 (aged 18)	7	1	(United States Soccer Federation) Solar SC

== Group D ==
=== Guyana ===
Coach: (Guyana) Dr. Ivan Joseph

No.	Pos.	Player	Date of birth (age)	Club
1	GK	Aneesa O'Brien	27 April 2002 (aged 17)	(Canadian Soccer Association) FC Durham
20	GK	Raven Edwards-Dowdall	14 May 2000 (aged 19)	(Canadian Soccer Association) Seneca College
2	DF	Anaya Johnson	1 January 2003 (aged 17)	(Canadian Soccer Association) Woodbridge Strikers
3	DF	Jessica Myers	4 September 2002 (aged 17)	(Canadian Soccer Association) FC Durham
4	DF	Brianne Desa	6 July 2000 (aged 19)	(Canadian Soccer Association) FC Durham
11	DF	Jenea Knight	25 May 2003 (aged 16)	(Canadian Soccer Association) FC Durham
18	DF	Sydney Puddicombe	2 January 2002 (aged 18)	(Canadian Soccer Association) ANB Futbol Academy
5	MF	Jade Vyfhuis (C)	27 November 2001 (aged 18)	(Canadian Soccer Association) Markham SC
7	MF	Nailah Rowe	10 September 2001 (aged 18)	(Canadian Soccer Association) FC Durham
8	MF	Serena McDonald	1 August 2002 (aged 17)	(Canadian Soccer Association) ANB Futbol Academy
10	MF	Kiana Khedoo	16 December 2002 (aged 17)	(Canadian Soccer Association) North Mississauga SC
12	MF	Tori DeNobrega	9 May 2002 (aged 17)	(Canadian Soccer Association) FC Durham
13	MF	Shanice Alfred	29 August 2001 (aged 18)	(Canadian Soccer Association) ANB Futbol Academy
14	MF	Hailey David	15 March 2002 (aged 17)	(Canadian Soccer Association) Pickering FC
15	MF	Samantha Banfield	17 February 2004 (aged 16)	(Canadian Soccer Association) United FA OPDL
19	MF	Horicia Adams	4 September 2001 (aged 18)	(Guyana Football Federation) Foxy Ladies
6	FW	Tiandi Smith	24 November 2001 (aged 18)	(Guyana Football Federation) Fruta Conquerors
9	FW	Audrey Narine	24 May 2002 (aged 17)	(Canadian Soccer Association) Pickering FC
16	FW	Shamya Daniels	8 August 2004 (aged 15)	(Guyana Football Federation) Fruta Conquerors
17	FW	Makayla Rudder	1 July 2001 (aged 18)	(Canadian Soccer Association) Durham College

=== Mexico ===
Coach: (Mexico) Mónica Vergara

No.	Pos.	Player	Date of birth (age)	Club
1	GK	Zoe Aguirre	3 October 2000 (aged 19)	(United States Soccer Federation) Eastern Kentucky Lady Colonels
12	GK	Wendy Toledo	13 September 2000 (aged 19)	(Mexican Football Federation) Santos Laguna
3	DF	Tanna Sánchez	21 December 2001 (aged 18)	(Mexican Football Federation) Tec Monterrey Puebla
4	DF	Nicole Soto	8 July 2001 (aged 18)	(United States Soccer Federation) Arizona State Sun Devils
5	DF	Ximena Ríos	26 July 2001 (aged 18)	(Mexican Football Federation) América
6	DF	Laura Parra	19 December 2000 (aged 19)	(Mexican Football Federation) Toluca
15	DF	Julieta Peralta	15 April 2002 (aged 17)	(Mexican Football Federation) Pachuca
16	DF	Reyna Reyes	16 February 2001 (aged 19)	(United States Soccer Federation) Alabama Crimson Tide
19	DF	Karla Zempoalteca	18 May 2000 (aged 19)	(Mexican Football Federation) León
8	MF	Nicole Pérez	30 August 2001 (aged 18)	(Mexican Football Federation) Guadalajara
11	MF	Anette Vázquez	11 March 2002 (aged 17)	(Mexican Football Federation) Guadalajara
17	MF	Yanín Madrid	28 June 2002 (aged 17)	(Mexican Football Federation) Pachuca
18	MF	Silvana Flores	18 April 2002 (aged 17)	(The Football Association) Arsenal Academy
20	MF	Maricarmen Reyes	23 April 2000 (aged 19)	(United States Soccer Federation) UCLA Bruins
2	FW	Destinee Manzo	2 August 2000 (aged 19)	(United States Soccer Federation) UC Irvine Anteaters
7	FW	Nayeli Díaz	10 October 2001 (aged 18)	(United States Soccer Federation) Saint Mary's Gaels
9	FW	Gabriela Juárez	13 April 2000 (aged 19)	(United States Soccer Federation) Princeton Tigers
10	FW	Alison González	31 January 2002 (aged 18)	(Mexican Football Federation) Atlas
13	FW	Joseline Montoya	3 July 2000 (aged 19)	(Mexican Football Federation) Guadalajara
14	FW	Mariel Román	17 November 2002 (aged 17)	(Mexican Football Federation) Toluca

=== Nicaragua ===
Coach: Elna Dixon

No.	Pos.	Player	Date of birth (age)	Club
1	GK	Beykel Méndez	16 November 2000 (aged 19)	Unattached
20	GK	Yahara Salmerón	7 March 2000 (aged 19)	(Nicaraguan Football Federation) Diriangén
2	DF	Gloria Bermúdez	1 June 2000 (aged 19)	(Nicaraguan Football Federation) Leyendas Fútbol Club
5	DF	Kesly Pérez	9 May 2000 (aged 19)	(Nicaraguan Football Federation) Leyendas Fútbol Club
8	DF	Jonnie Sánchez	28 January 2002 (aged 18)	Unknown
17	DF	Ana Silva	9 January 2002 (aged 18)	Unknown
18	DF	Daniela Pérez	26 December 2003 (aged 16)	Unknown
4	MF	Ruth Mendoza	11 September 2000 (aged 19)	Unknown
6	MF	Kathering Jarquín	27 June 2000 (aged 19)	(Nicaraguan Football Federation) UNAN Managua
7	MF	Jackie Gilday	12 November 2000 (aged 19)	(United States Soccer Federation) UCLA Bruins
10	MF	Nathaly Silva	15 August 2001 (aged 18)	Unknown
15	MF	Eyding Talavera	10 October 2001 (aged 18)	Unknown
16	MF	Heysell Martínez	10 May 2001 (aged 18)	(Nicaraguan Football Federation) Real Estelí
3	FW	Lisbeth Moreno	6 August 2000 (aged 19)	(Nicaraguan Football Federation) Somotillo F.C
9	FW	Emely Obregón	12 September 2001 (aged 18)	Unknown
11	FW	Lilieth Rivera	4 May 2001 (aged 18)	Unknown
12	FW	Dayana Calero	1 May 2002 (aged 17)	Unknown
13	FW	Yorcelly Humphreys	3 September 2001 (aged 18)	(Nicaraguan Football Federation) Leyendas Fútbol Club
14	FW	Sayri Toruno	15 December 2001 (aged 18)	Unknown
19	FW	Alma Gutiérrez	12 December 2001 (aged 18)	(Nicaraguan Football Federation) Real Estelí

=== Puerto Rico ===
Coach: (Puerto Rico) Elias Llabres

No.	Pos.	Player	Date of birth (age)	Club
1	GK	Cristina Roque	6 November 2001 (aged 18)	(United States Soccer Federation) Florida State Seminoles
18	GK	Cristina Nazario	3 January 2002 (aged 18)	(Puerto Rican Football Federation) GPS Puerto Rico
2	DF	Alondra Nieves	24 March 2003 (aged 16)	(Puerto Rican Football Federation) Bayamon FC
13	DF	Mikayla Jennings	9 June 2002 (aged 17)	(United States Soccer Federation) NYXFC
14	DF	Sofia Goytia	30 August 2001 (aged 18)	(United States Soccer Federation) North Florida Ospreys
20	DF	Valeria Pomales	19 September 2002 (aged 17)	(United States Soccer Federation) NCFC
3	MF	Leilany Rivera	2 August 2001 (aged 18)	(Puerto Rican Football Federation) Bayamon FC
6	MF	Julia Rodríguez	5 October 2001 (aged 18)	(United States Soccer Federation) Florida kraze Krush
7	MF	Malina Pardo	29 June 2001 (aged 18)	(United States Soccer Federation) UNC Wilmington Seahawks
8	MF	María Luisa Colón	25 June 2001 (aged 18)	(United States Soccer Federation) Babson College
9	MF	Ana Díaz	26 August 2002 (aged 17)	(United States Soccer Federation) United Futbol Academy
10	MF	Mariana Varela	11 March 2002 (aged 17)	(Puerto Rican Football Federation) GPS Puerto Rico
11	MF	Cristina Torres (C)	3 October 2000 (aged 19)	(Puerto Rican Football Federation) Puerto Rico Sol
12	MF	Andrea Santiago	16 May 2000 (aged 19)	(United States Soccer Federation) North Carolina Tar Heels
15	MF	Belerica Oquendo	12 February 2001 (aged 19)	(United States Soccer Federation) TCU Horned Frogs
16	MF	Paola Morales	4 February 2000 (aged 20)	(United States Soccer Federation) CSUSB
4	FW	Idelys Vázquez	21 September 2000 (aged 19)	Unattached
5	FW	Gabrielle Cimino	12 January 2001 (aged 19)	(United States Soccer Federation) Coral Gables youth center
17	FW	Zoemi Cobián	28 January 2001 (aged 19)	(United States Soccer Federation) Assumption Greyhounds
19	FW	Caileen Almeida	20 November 2002 (aged 17)	(United States Soccer Federation) Charlotte Independence

== Group E ==
=== Canada ===
Coach: (Canada) Rhian Wilkinson

No.	Pos.	Player	Date of birth (age)	Caps	Goals	Club
1	GK	Anna Karpenko	10 April 2002 (aged 17)	0	0	(Canadian Soccer Association) Vaughan SC
18	GK	Kayza Massey	1 February 2001 (aged 19)	0	0	(United States Soccer Federation) West Virginia Mountaineers
6	DF	Jade Rose	12 February 2003 (aged 17)	0	0	(Canadian Soccer Association) Unionville Milliken SC
8	DF	Emma Regan	28 January 2000 (aged 20)	11	0	(United States Soccer Federation) Texas Longhorns
13	DF	Samantha Chang	13 July 2000 (aged 19)	0	0	(United States Soccer Federation) University of South Carolina
15	DF	Molly Quarry	5 March 2002 (aged 17)	0	0	(Canadian Soccer Association) Vancouver Whitecaps FC Girls Elite Super REX
16	DF	Joanna Verzosa-Dolezal	12 March 2002 (aged 17)	0	0	(Canadian Soccer Association) Vancouver Whitecaps FC Girls Elite
4	MF	Marika Guay	17 January 2000 (aged 20)	0	0	(United States Soccer Federation) Santa Clara Broncos
7	MF	Mya Jones	1 August 2001 (aged 18)	4	0	(United States Soccer Federation) University of Memphis
10	MF	Maya Ladhani	6 September 2002 (aged 17)	4	0	(Canadian Soccer Association) Super REX Ontario
12	MF	Caitlin Shaw	20 July 2001 (aged 18)	4	0	(United States Soccer Federation) Oregon Ducks
14	MF	Lara Kazandjian	27 September 2002 (aged 17)	0	0	(Canadian Soccer Association) Lakeshore SC
16	MF	Sonia Walk	12 August 2002 (aged 17)	0	0	(Canadian Soccer Association) Super REX Ontario
18	MF	Wayny Balata	25 June 2001 (aged 18)	0	0	(Canadian Soccer Association) Lakeshore SC
19	MF	Jazmine Wilkinson	8 March 2002 (aged 17)	0	0	(Canadian Soccer Association) Vancouver Whitecaps FC Girls Elite Super REX
2	FW	Caleigh Boeckx	26 July 2000 (aged 19)	0	0	(United States Soccer Federation) Rice University
3	FW	Léonie Portelance	7 November 2001 (aged 18)	0	0	(Canadian Soccer Association) AS Varennes
9	FW	Tanya Boychuk	20 June 2000 (aged 19)	3	1	(Canadian Soccer Association) FC Edmonton REX
11	FW	Kaila Novak	24 March 2002 (aged 17)	0	0	(United States Soccer Federation) UCLA Bruins
17	FW	Andersen Williams	2 April 2002 (aged 17)	0	0	(United States Soccer Federation) Texas A & M University

=== El Salvador ===
Coach: Elías Ramírez

No.	Pos.	Player	Date of birth (age)	Club
1	GK	Paola de Paz	4 June 2004 (aged 15)	(Salvadoran Football Federation) ASDEFUT
18	GK	Gilma Mártir	5 June 2002 (aged 17)	(Salvadoran Football Federation) UES
2	DF	Elaily Hernández	27 May 2000 (aged 19)	(United States Soccer Federation) Washington State Cougars
3	DF	Alexa Escobar	7 March 2000 (aged 19)	(United States Soccer Federation) Montgomery Raptors
4	DF	Gloria González	14 April 2001 (aged 18)	(Salvadoran Football Federation) FAS
5	DF	Jessica Ortiz	23 October 2001 (aged 18)	(Salvadoran Football Federation) FAS
9	DF	Jeniffer Castellanos	6 April 2002 (aged 17)	(Salvadoran Football Federation) Alianza
15	DF	Jennifer Sosa	5 August 2004 (aged 15)	(Salvadoran Football Federation) UES
16	DF	Mónica Mancía	28 February 2003 (aged 16)	(Salvadoran Football Federation) IMDER
20	DF	Jaqueline Portillo	29 December 2001 (aged 18)	(Salvadoran Football Federation) Santa Tecla
6	MF	Andrea Amaya	16 February 2003 (aged 17)	(Salvadoran Football Federation) Alianza
8	MF	Alexandra Molina	5 February 2004 (aged 16)	(Salvadoran Football Federation) ASDEFUT
10	MF	Mara Rodríguez	6 July 2000 (aged 19)	(United States Soccer Federation) Providence Friars
12	MF	Yaquelyn Jovel	8 June 2000 (aged 19)	(Salvadoran Football Federation) FAS
14	MF	Evelin Panilla	4 April 2001 (aged 18)	(Salvadoran Football Federation) Alianza
17	MF	Tatiana Soriano	30 April 2001 (aged 18)	(Salvadoran Football Federation) UES
7	FW	Samaria Gómez	18 February 2002 (aged 18)	(Nicaraguan Football Federation) Real Estelí
11	FW	Yoselyn López	16 March 2001 (aged 18)	(Salvadoran Football Federation) FAS
13	FW	Angélica Avelar	23 January 2002 (aged 18)	(United States Soccer Federation) Glendora Tartans
19	FW	Diana Molina	10 April 2002 (aged 17)	(Salvadoran Football Federation) Santa Tecla

=== Guatemala ===
Coach: Henry González

No.	Pos.	Player	Date of birth (age)	Club
1	GK	Ashley Avalos	19 September 2000 (aged 19)	
12	GK	Fabiola Montenegro	30 June 2003 (aged 16)	
3	DF	Ariadna Olayo	26 March 2004 (aged 15)	
4	DF	Jezmín Castellanos	7 November 2002 (aged 17)	
5	DF	Marcela Anzueto	11 August 2002 (aged 17)	
8	DF	Daniela Mazariegos	31 January 2002 (aged 18)	
19	DF	Vivian Montenegro	10 December 2001 (aged 18)	
2	MF	Elisa Texaj	5 February 2003 (aged 17)	
9	MF	Aylín Juárez	18 June 2002 (aged 17)	
15	MF	Celsa Cruz	12 September 2003 (aged 16)	
17	MF	Gerta García	28 June 2000 (aged 19)	
18	MF	Sofía Ovando	20 July 2003 (aged 16)	
6	FW	Beverly Reyes	3 January 2001 (aged 19)	
7	FW	María Recinos	12 January 2000 (aged 20)	
10	FW	Andrea Álvarez	13 January 2003 (aged 17)	
11	FW	Gabriela Brito	2 July 2004 (aged 15)	
13	FW	Lesly Ventura	22 May 2003 (aged 16)	
14	FW	Martha Reyes	21 June 2000 (aged 19)	
16	FW	María Tarrago	15 May 2002 (aged 17)	
20	FW	Jenifer Ortiz	23 July 2001 (aged 18)	

=== Jamaica ===
Coach: (Jamaica) Xavier Gilbert

No.	Pos.	Player	Date of birth (age)	Club
1	GK	Milan Dewkinandan	3 November 2000 (aged 19)	(United States Soccer Federation) Grambling State University
3	GK	Tayleur Little	8 July 2000 (aged 19)	(United States Soccer Federation) Post Eagles
13	GK	Ella Dennis	28 February 2000 (aged 19)	(United States Soccer Federation) Alcorn State University
2	DF	Lauren Reid	8 November 2002 (aged 17)	(United States Soccer Federation) Real Colorado
5	DF	Nevillegail Able	15 February 2002 (aged 18)	(Jamaica Football Federation) Waterhouse FC
6	DF	Gabrielle Gayle	14 October 2000 (aged 19)	(United States Soccer Federation) Daytona State College
14	DF	Ciara Whitely	27 September 2000 (aged 19)	(United States Soccer Federation) Mercer University
15	DF	Malia Atkins	3 February 2002 (aged 18)	(United States Soccer Federation) Real Colorado
4	MF	Tacia Austin	16 November 2001 (aged 18)	(Jamaica Football Federation) UWI F.C.
8	MF	Sherice Clarke	3 August 2000 (aged 19)	(United States Soccer Federation) Louisiana State University at Eunice
9	MF	Lacey Murray	22 October 2000 (aged 19)	(Jamaica Football Federation) Waterhouse FC
16	MF	Peyton McNamara	22 February 2002 (aged 18)	(United States Soccer Federation) Connecticut FC
17	MF	Alexia Spencer	28 January 2002 (aged 18)	(United States Soccer Federation) College of William and Mary
19	MF	Jordyn Bartholomew	25 August 2002 (aged 17)	(United States Soccer Federation) Concord Fire
20	MF	Gabrielle Scarlett	30 October 2001 (aged 18)	(United States Soccer Federation) Weston FC
7	FW	Sydoney Clarke	30 June 2001 (aged 18)	(United States Soccer Federation) Monroe College
10	FW	Jody Brown (c)	16 April 2002 (aged 17)	(United States Soccer Federation) Montverde Academy
11	FW	Marlee Fray	2 November 2000 (aged 19)	(United States Soccer Federation) University of Central Florida
12	FW	Chantelle Parker	3 February 2002 (aged 18)	(Canadian Soccer Association) Oakville Blue Devils FC
18	FW	Jaden Roberts	5 September 2001 (aged 18)	(United States Soccer Federation) Rice University

== Group F ==
=== Cayman Islands ===
Coach: (United States) Stephan De Four

No.	Pos.	Player	Date of birth (age)	Club
1	GK	Kiara Lemay	14 September 2003 (aged 16)	
12	GK	Satiah Miller	9 July 2003 (aged 16)	
2	DF	Shannelle Bennett	5 June 2001 (aged 18)	
3	DF	Avigail Ramirez	27 June 2002 (aged 17)	
4	DF	Artemis Deslandes-Hydes	21 July 2003 (aged 16)	
5	MF	Jhosta Williams	19 March 2000 (aged 19)	
8	MF	Daniella Gourzong	2 October 2002 (aged 17)	
10	MF	Molly Kehoe	10 August 2004 (aged 15)	
11	MF	Shayla Connor	29 May 2002 (aged 17)	
13	MF	Lauren Scott	21 July 2000 (aged 19)	
14	MF	Sabrina Suberan	10 December 2002 (aged 17)	
16	MF	Riley Doyle	25 November 2004 (aged 15)	
20	MF	Alexia Bromfield	2 June 2005 (aged 14)	
6	FW	Ethana Villalobos	29 May 2003 (aged 16)	
7	FW	Serena Nelson	10 January 2000 (aged 20)	
9	MF	Brianna Poyfong	3 May 2001 (aged 18)	
15	FW	Shayana Windsor	19 November 2003 (aged 16)	
17	FW	Tamoy Phillips	12 May 2001 (aged 18)	
18	FW	Kayla Bradley	16 August 2005 (aged 14)	
19	FW	Ashlyn Evans	13 April 2006 (aged 13)	

=== Haiti ===
Coach: (France) Laurent Mortel

No.	Pos.	Player	Date of birth (age)	Club
1	GK	Madelina Fleuriot	28 October 2003 (aged 16)	(Haitian Football Federation) Exafoot
12	GK	Nahomie Ambroise	13 November 2003 (aged 16)	(Haitian Football Federation) Anacaona SC
2	DF	Tabita Joseph	13 September 2003 (aged 16)	(Haitian Football Federation) AS Tigresses
3	DF	Méghane Saint-Cyr	26 February 2003 (aged 16)	(Canadian Soccer Association) CS St-Hubert
4	DF	Ruthny Mathurin	14 January 2001 (aged 19)	(Haitian Football Federation) AS Trigresses
5	DF	Esthericove Joseph	5 February 2003 (aged 17)	(Haitian Football Federation) Exafoot
19	DF	Maudeline Moryl	24 January 2003 (aged 17)	(Haitian Football Federation) ASF Croix-des-Bouquets
20	DF	Rose Pierreline France	3 October 2003 (aged 16)	(Haitian Football Federation) ASF Croix-des-Bouquets
6	MF	Mirlene Dorce	13 February 2003 (aged 17)	(Haitian Football Federation) ASF Croix-des-Bouquets
8	MF	Danielle Étienne	16 January 2001 (aged 19)	(United States Soccer Federation) Fordham Rams
10	MF	Melchie Dumornay(c)	17 August 2003 (aged 16)	(Haitian Football Federation) AS Trigresses
15	MF	Gaëlle Dumas	21 February 2003 (aged 17)	(Haitian Football Federation) ASF Croix-des-Bouquets
16	MF	Dayana Pierre-Louis	24 September 2003 (aged 16)	(Haitian Football Federation) ASF Croix-des-Bouquets
18	MF	Rose-Alya Marcellus	22 March 2003 (aged 16)	(Haitian Football Federation) ASF Croix-des-Bouquets
7	FW	Abaina Louis	29 November 2001 (aged 18)	(Haitian Football Federation) AS Tigresses
9	FW	Darlina Florsie Joseph	15 December 2003 (aged 16)	(Haitian Football Federation) Don Bosco FC
11	FW	Betina Petit-Frère	1 August 2003 (aged 16)	(Haitian Football Federation) Exafoot
13	FW	Mariline Guerrier	14 July 2003 (aged 16)	(Haitian Football Federation) Exafoot
14	FW	Valentina Ornis	22 August 2003 (aged 16)	(Haitian Football Federation) ASF Croix-des-Bouquets
17	FW	Flero Dina Surpris	16 January 2003 (aged 17)	(Haitian Football Federation) ASF Croix-des-Bouquets

=== Saint Kitts and Nevis ===
Coach: Orrin Hughes

No.	Pos.	Player	Date of birth (age)	Club
1	GK	Quinn Josiah	4 May 2000 (aged 19)	
2	GK	Craivecia Sutton	1 September 2001 (aged 18)	
18	GK	Mellisa Drew	24 June 2000 (aged 19)	
5	DF	Geniah Demming	4 September 2004 (aged 15)	
17	DF	Shania Henry	12 July 2005 (aged 14)	
20	DF	Shitoncia Stapleton	13 February 2001 (aged 19)	
3	MF	Glenecia Battice	22 May 2003 (aged 16)	
4	MF	Kaleah Smith	28 June 2001 (aged 18)	
6	MF	Christi-Anne Mills	27 July 2002 (aged 17)	
7	MF	Zonia Marshall	6 May 2003 (aged 16)	
8	MF	Kaylee Bennett	23 March 2004 (aged 15)	
12	MF	Kaara Williams	30 August 2001 (aged 18)	
13	MF	Jarencia Jeffers	23 August 2001 (aged 18)	
14	MF	Eve Richards	17 April 2003 (aged 16)	
15	MF	Hadassah St. Juste	26 June 2002 (aged 17)	
16	MF	Jollincia Clarke	29 February 2000 (aged 19)	
19	MF	Malaika Rouse	12 February 2005 (aged 15)	
9	FW	Jahzara Claxton	12 March 2006 (aged 13)	
10	FW	Jasonna Williams	28 March 2003 (aged 16)	
11	FW	Iyanla Bailey-Williams	10 August 2002 (aged 17)	

=== Trinidad and Tobago ===
Coach: Richard Hood

No.	Pos.	Player	Date of birth (age)	Club
1	GK	K'lil Keshwar	17 July 2000 (aged 19)	(United States Soccer Federation) St. Francis Brooklyn Terriers
18	GK	Chelsea Ramnauth	21 June 2002 (aged 17)	(Trinidad and Tobago Football Association) Fyzabad Secondary School
2	DF	Roshun Williams	5 February 2003 (aged 17)	(Trinidad and Tobago Football Association) Waterloo Institute
3	DF	Nathifa Hackshaw	23 May 2001 (aged 18)	(Trinidad and Tobago Football Association) Rangers FC
4	DF	Lathifa Pascall	2 July 2003 (aged 16)	(Trinidad and Tobago Football Association) Pleasantville Secondary School
5	DF	Tsian Fernandez	7 October 2000 (aged 19)	(Trinidad and Tobago Football Association) Pleasantville Secondary School
15	DF	Arnelle Douglas	4 February 2000 (aged 20)	(Canadian Soccer Association) Brock Badgers
6	MF	Aaliyah Pascall	6 November 2001 (aged 18)	(Trinidad and Tobago Football Association) Pleasantville Secondary School
7	MF	Sarah De Gannes	22 September 2002 (aged 17)	(Canadian Soccer Association) Internazionale SC
8	MF	Maria-Frances Serrant	14 November 2002 (aged 17)	(Trinidad and Tobago Football Association) Diego Martin Central Secondary School
11	MF	Chrissy Mitchell	17 January 2002 (aged 18)	(Trinidad and Tobago Football Association) Mayaro Secondary School
13	MF	Megan Rampersad	16 June 2000 (aged 19)	(United States Soccer Federation) Wellington Wave
14	MF	Moenesa Mejia	4 December 2003 (aged 16)	(United States Soccer Federation) FC Cardinals
16	MF	Sydni Greaves	12 May 2000 (aged 19)	(United States Soccer Federation) Longwood Lancers
9	FW	Afiyah Cornwall	10 April 2002 (aged 17)	(Trinidad and Tobago Football Association) Waterloo Institute
10	FW	Alexia Ali	11 June 2000 (aged 19)	(Trinidad and Tobago Football Association) Pleasantville Secondary School
12	FW	Cayla McFarlane	10 June 2002 (aged 17)	(United States Soccer Federation) Polytechnic School
17	DF	Celine Loraine	18 May 2002 (aged 17)	(Trinidad and Tobago Football Association) Signal Hill Secondary School
19	FW	Aaliyah Prince	5 February 2001 (aged 19)	(United States Soccer Federation) Northeast Texas Eagles
20	FW	Tori Paul	22 August 2002 (aged 17)	(United States Soccer Federation) Charlotte Independence
