= 2019 Sud Ladies Cup =

2ème Sud Ladies Cup – Tournoi Maurice Revello (in French)

Tournament details
- Host country: France
- Dates: 8–18 May 2019
- Teams: 6 (from 4 associations)
- Venues: 4 (in 4 host cities)

Final positions
- Champions: North Korea (1st title)
- Runners-up: Japan
- Third place: France
- Fourth place: Mexico

Tournament statistics
- Matches played: 15
- Goals scored: 65 (4.33 per match)
- Top scorer: (North Korea) Kim Kyong-yong (5 goals)
- Best player: (Mexico) Silvana Flores
- Best goalkeeper: (North Korea) Yu Son-gum
- Fair play award: Japan

The 2019 Sud Ladies Cup (officially French: 2ème Sud Ladies Cup – Tournoi Maurice Revello) was the second edition of the Sud Ladies Cup women's football tournament.

It was held in the region of Provence-Alpes-Côte d'Azur from 8 to 18 May 2019. In this season, the tournament was contested by under-19 national teams.

North Korea won their first title without conceding a goal.

== Participants ==
Six participating teams were announced in March 2019.

AFC

- Japan (1st participation)
- North Korea (1st participation)

CAF

- Gabon (1st participation)

CONCACAF

- Haiti (2nd participation)
- Mexico (1st participation)

UEFA

- France (2nd participation)

== Venues ==
A total of four cities hosted the tournament.

2019 Sud Ladies Cup is located in Provence-Alpes-Côte d'Azur
Châteaurenard	Fos-sur-Mer
Stade Pierre De Coubertin	Stade de l'Allée des Pins
43.8812086°N 4.8671804°E	43.4429219°N 4.9388693°E
Capacity: 2,085	Capacity: 1,000
Mallemort	Salon-de-Provence
Stade d'Honneur	Stade d'Honneur Marcel Roustan
43.7241096°N 5.1774767°E	43.6356163°N 5.0928964°E
Capacity: 720	Capacity: 4,000

== Match officials ==
The referees were:

(France) Victoria Beyer

Assistants: Camille Soriano, Stéphanie di Benedetto and Romy Fournier

(Gabon) Raïssa Matamba

Assistants: Préssilia Nho Ndong and Richie Nganda

(Haiti) Judith Ambroise

Assistants:Ebernise Louis and Wesline Louis

(Japan) Haruna Kanematsu

Assistants: Mio Ogata and Saki Nakamoto

== Format ==
The six invited teams played a round-robin tournament. The teams were ranked according to points (3 points for a win, 1 point for a draw, and 0 points for a loss). If at the end of a match it ended in a draw, an additional point would be given to the winner of a penalty shoot-out. If tied on points, head-to-head match would be used to determine the ranking.

== Results ==
Pos	Team	Pld	W	D	L	GF	GA	GD	Pts
1	North Korea	5	4	1	0	16	0	+16	13
2	Japan	5	4	0	1	18	3	+15	12
3	France (H)	5	2	2	1	11	2	+9	10
4	Mexico	5	1	2	2	13	5	+8	6
5	Haiti	5	1	1	3	7	11	−4	4
6	Gabon	5	0	0	5	0	44	−44	0

Source: Sud Ladies Cup
(H) Hosts

All times are local CEST

8 May 2019
12:30

Japan	3–2	Mexico
Kanno 66'; Osawa 67'; Hirosawa 72'	Report	González 38'; Reyes 84'

Stade d'Honneur Marcel Roustan, Salon-de-Provence
Referee: Victoria Beyer (France)
8 May 2019
15:00

Gabon	0–7	Haiti
	Report	D. Joseph 46'; Louis 59', 61', 78', 90+3'; Étienne 85'; Asseng Obounet 90' (o.g.)

Stade d'Honneur Marcel Roustan, Salon-de-Provence
Referee: Haruna Kanematsu (Japan)
8 May 2019
17:30

France	0–0	North Korea
	Report
Penalties
Saint-Georges (penalty missed); Le Mouël (penalty scored); Delabre (penalty scored); Badr Bassem (penalty missed); Lerond (penalty scored); Martinez (penalty scored)	4–3	(penalty missed) Kim Hyang; (penalty missed) Ri Sin-ok; (penalty scored) Kim Yun-ok; (penalty scored) Yun Ji-hwa; (penalty scored) Ri Kum-hyang; (penalty missed) Ri Chong-gyong

Stade d'Honneur Marcel Roustan, Salon-de-Provence
Referee: Raïssa Matamba (Gabon)

10 May 2019
15:00

Mexico	0–1	North Korea
	Report	Kim Kyong-yong 58'

Stade d'Honneur, Mallemort
Referee: Raïssa Matamba (Gabon)
10 May 2019
17:30

France	4–0	Haiti
Cardia 39', 68'; Philippe 62'; Ouchène 83'	Report

Stade d'Honneur, Mallemort
Referee: Haruna Kanematsu (Japan)
10 May 2019
17:30

Gabon	0–11	Japan
	Report	Imada 6'; A. Takeda 21', 90+1'; Morita 36'; Tabata 53'; Hirosawa 64'; Miura 71', 82' (pen.); Nakao 84' (pen.); Nagae 86'; Kojima 90+3'

Stade de l'Allée des Pins, Fos-sur-Mer
Referee: Judith Ambroise (Haiti)

12 May 2019
12:30

Japan	0–1	North Korea
	Report	Ito 45+2' (o.g.)

Stade d'Honneur Marcel Roustan, Salon-de-Provence
Referee: Victoria Beyer (France)
12 May 2019
17:30

Haiti	0–0	Mexico
	Report
Penalties
Gustave (penalty missed); Lindor (penalty scored); Étienne (penalty missed); T. Joseph (penalty missed)	1–3	(penalty scored) Pérez; (penalty scored) Juárez; (penalty scored) Palomo

Stade d'Honneur Marcel Roustan, Salon-de-Provence
Referee: Haruna Kanematsu (Japan)
13 May 2019
15:00

France	6–0	Gabon
Ouchène 10'; Philippe 51'; Feller 68'; Lakrar 75', 90+2'; Badr Bassem 78'	Report

Stade d'Honneur Marcel Roustan, Salon-de-Provence
Referee: Judith Ambroise (Haiti)

15 May 2019
15:00

Japan	3–0	Haiti
Hirosawa 10'; Osawa 50'; Ito 77'	Report

Stade Pierre De Coubertin, Châteaurenard
Referee: Victoria Beyer (France)
15 May 2019
15:00

North Korea	10–0	Gabon
Kim Kyong-yong 7', 20', 54', 56'; Pong Song-ae 22', 45+2'; Ibogni Mouiti 24' (o.g.); Ri Chong-gyong 59'; O Si-nae 67'; Pak Il-gyong 75'	Report

Stade d'Honneur, Mallemort
Referee: Judith Ambroise (Haiti)
15 May 2019
17:30

France	1–1	Mexico
Feller 90+4'	Report	González 62'
Penalties
Baltimore (penalty scored); Riquelme Jouanin (penalty scored); Le Mouël (penalty scored); Jean-François (penalty scored); Ribeiro de Carvalho (penalty missed); Saint-Georges (penalty scored); Bogi (penalty scored)	6–5	(penalty scored) Pérez; (penalty missed) Reyes; (penalty scored) Juárez; (penalty scored) Palomo; (penalty scored) González; (penalty scored) Díaz; (penalty missed) Flores

Stade d'Honneur, Mallemort
Referee: Raïssa Matamba (Gabon)

18 May 2019
12:30

North Korea	4–0	Haiti
Yun Ji-hwa 25', 52', 82'; Ri Kum-hyang 84'	Report

Stade d'Honneur Marcel Roustan, Salon-de-Provence
Referee: Victoria Beyer (France)
18 May 2019
15:00

Gabon	0–10	Mexico
	Report	Román 7', 22'; Díaz 17', 69'; Ríos 41'; Reyes 43'; Mauleón 60', 65'; Juárez 73', 78'

Stade d'Honneur Marcel Roustan, Salon-de-Provence
Referee: Haruna Kanematsu (Japan)
18 May 2019
17:30

France	0–1	Japan
	Report	Osawa 51'

Stade d'Honneur Marcel Roustan, Salon-de-Provence
Referee: Judith Ambroise (Haiti)

== Statistics ==
=== Goalscorers ===
There were 65 goals scored in 15 matches, for an average of 4.33 goals per match.

5 goals

- (North Korea) Kim Kyong-yong

4 goals

- (Haiti) Abaïna Louis

3 goals

- (Japan) Maho Hirosawa
- (Japan) Haruka Osawa
- (North Korea) Yun Ji-hwa

2 goals

- (France) Mickaëlla Cardia
- (France) Naomie Feller
- (France) Maëlle Lakrar
- (France) Sonia Ouchène
- (France) Chloé Philippe
- (Japan) Haruka Miura
- (Japan) Asumi Takeda
- (Mexico) Nayeli Díaz
- (Mexico) Alison González
- (Mexico) Gabriela Juárez
- (Mexico) Natalia Mauleón
- (Mexico) Reyna Reyes
- (Mexico) Mariel Román
- (North Korea) Pong Song-ae

1 goal

- (France) Chaïma Badr Bassem
- (Haiti) Danielle Étienne
- (Haiti) Darlina Joseph
- (Japan) Sara Imada
- (Japan) Sara Ito
- (Japan) Oto Kanno
- (Japan) Seira Kojima
- (Japan) Misaki Morita
- (Japan) Ibuki Nagae
- (Japan) Momo Nakao
- (Japan) Haruna Tabata
- (Mexico) Mayra Ríos
- (North Korea) O Si-nae
- (North Korea) Pak Il-gyong
- (North Korea) Ri Chong-gyong
- (North Korea) Ri Kum-hyang

1 own goal

- (Gabon) Tatiana Asseng Obounet (against Haiti)
- (Gabon) Isia Ibogni Mouiti (against North Korea)
- (Japan) Sara Ito (against North Korea)

=== MVP of the game ===
Rank	Name	Team	Opponent	Awards
1	Kim Kyong-yong	North Korea	Mexico, Gabon	2
1	Haruka Osawa	Japan	Mexico, France	2
3	Abaïna Louis	Haiti	Gabon	1
3	Justine Lerond	France	North Korea	1
3	Mickaëlla Cardia	France	Haiti	1
3	Maho Hirosawa	Japan	Gabon	1
3	Ri Kum-hyang	North Korea	Japan	1
3	Silvana Flores	Mexico	Haiti	1
3	Chloé Philippe	France	Gabon	1
3	Sara Ito	Japan	Haiti	1
3	Alison González	Mexico	France	1
3	Yun Ji-hwa	North Korea	Haiti	1
3	Natalia Mauleón	Mexico	Gabon	1

=== Awards ===
After the final, the following players were rewarded for their performances during the competition.

- Best player: (Mexico) Silvana Flores
- Best goalkeeper: (North Korea) Yu Son-gum
- Topscorer: (North Korea) Kim Kyong-yong
- Fair play: Japan

=== Sud Ladies Cup 2019 best XI ===
The best XI team was a squad consisting of the eleven most impressive players at the tournament.

Pos.	Player
GK	(North Korea) Yu Son-gum
DF	(Haiti) Tabita Joseph
DF	(North Korea) Ri Kum-hyang
DF	(Japan) Oto Kanno
DF	(Mexico) Reyna Reyes
MF	(North Korea) Yun Ji-hwa
MF	(Japan) Sara Ito
MF	(Mexico) Silvana Flores
FW	(Japan) Maho Hirosawa
FW	(North Korea) Kim Kyong-yong
FW	(France) Mickaëlla Cardia

== See also ==
- 2019 Toulon Tournament
