= Rylee Traicoff =

Canadian-Guyanese footballer (born 2001)

Personal information
- Date of birth: 9 November 2001 (age 25)
- Place of birth: Toronto, Ontario, Canada
- Height: 1.75 m (5 ft 9 in)
- Position: Defender

Team information
- Current team: Simcoe County Rovers FC

Youth career
- Markham SC
- FC Durham

College career
Years	Team	Apps	(Gls)
2019–2020	Bridgeport Purple Knights	14	(2)
2020–	Nipissing Lakers	26	(3)

Senior career*
Years	Team	Apps	(Gls)
2019	FC Oshawa	4	(0)
2022–2023	Electric City FC	16	(1)
2024–	Simcoe County Rovers FC	32	(2)
2026–	Simcoe County Rovers FC B	1	(0)

International career^{‡}
2019–2020	Guyana U20		
2018–	Guyana	10+	(0+)
- * Club domestic league appearances and goals as of April 21, 2026 ‡ National team caps and goals as of 17 February 2024

Rylee Traicoff (born 9 November 2001) is a footballer who plays as a defender for Simcoe County Rovers FC in League1 Ontario. Born in Canada, she represents Guyana at international level.

== University career ==
In 2018, Traicoff committed to the University of Bridgeport to play for the Bridgeport Purple Knights beginning in September 2019. She scored a brace on September 28, for her first two college goals, against the Lincoln Lions.

After one year with Bridgeport, she transferred to Canadian University Nipissing University to play for the Nipissing Lakers. In 2021, she was named an OUA Central Division All-Star. In 2022, she was named an OUA First Team All-Star. In 2023, she was named an OUA First Team All-Star.

== Club career ==
In 2019, she played for FC Oshawa in League1 Ontario.

In 2022, she played for Electric City FC. She scored her first goal on 3 July against Unionville Milliken SC. She re-signed with the club for the 2023 season.

In 2024, she began playing with Simcoe County Rovers FC.

== International career ==
Traicoff made her debut for the Guyana senior team at the 2018 CFU Women's Challenge Series at the age of 17. She appeared in all three matches, making her debut on April 25 against Grenada.

She played for the Guyana U20 at the 2020 CONCACAF Women's U-20 Championship qualification.

== See also ==
- List of Guyana women's international footballers
