= Aneesa O'Brien =

Guyanese footballer (born 2002)

Personal information
- Full name: Aneesa Ashante O'Brien
- Date of birth: 27 April 2002 (age 24)
- Place of birth: Richmond, British Columbia, Canada
- Height: 1.73 m (5 ft 8 in)
- Position: Goalkeeper

Team information
- Current team: Karmiotissa
- Number: 1

Youth career
- 20??–2019: FC Durham

College career
Years	Team	Apps	(Gls)
2020–2021	Jacksonville State Gamecocks	4	(0)
2023	Thompson Rivers WolfPack	7	(0)

Senior career*
Years	Team	Apps	(Gls)
2019	FC Oshawa	0	(0)
2024–	Karmiotissa	1	(0)

International career^{‡}
2019–	Guyana U20	10	(0)
2018–	Guyana	3+	(0+)
- * Club domestic league appearances and goals as of 13 October 2024 ‡ National team caps and goals as of 29 November 2023

Aneesa Ashante O'Brien (born 27 April 2002) is a footballer who plays as a goalkeeper for Cypriot First Division club Karmiotissa. Born in Canada, she represents Guyana at international level.

== College career ==
O'Brien committed to the Jacksonville State University in the United States. She made her college debut for the Jacksonville State Gamecocks on March 5, 2021, against the Southeast Missouri State Redhawks recording five saves in a 3–1 loss. She was named to the 2021 FTF All-Freshman Second Team.

== International career ==
Internationally, O'Brien represents Guyana, the nation of her mother's birth, after having been introduced to the program by her friend and Guyana international player Nailah Rowe.

At senior level, she made her debut in 2018 at the 2018 CFU Women's Challenge Series, at the age of 15, playing against Suriname and Trinidad and Tobago.

In 2019, O'Brien first represented Guyana U20 at the 2020 CONCACAF Women's U-20 Championship qualification tournament, appearing in four games, recording three clean sheet. She later represent them at the 2020 CONCACAF Women's U-20 Championship.

== See also ==
- List of Guyana women's international footballers
