= 2020 CONCACAF Women's U-20 Championship =

10th edition of the CONCACAF Women's U-20 Championship

Tournament details
- Host country: Dominican Republic
- Dates: 22 February – 8 March
- Teams: 20 (from 1 confederation)
- Venue(s): 2 (in 2 host cities)

Final positions
- Champions: United States (6th title)
- Runners-up: Mexico
- Third place: Haiti
- Fourth place: Dominican Republic

Tournament statistics
- Matches played: 39
- Goals scored: 198 (5.08 per match)
- Top scorer(s): (Haiti) Melchie Dumornay (14 goals)
- Best player(s): (United States) Mia Fishel
- Best goalkeeper: (Mexico) Wendy Toledo
- Fair play award: Mexico

The 2020 CONCACAF Women's U-20 Championship was the 10th edition of the CONCACAF Women's U-20 Championship, the biennial international youth football championship organized by CONCACAF for the women's under-20 national teams of the North, Central American and Caribbean region. The tournament was held in the Dominican Republic between 22 February and 8 March 2020.

The final tournament is expanded from eight to 20 teams, using the same format as the 2019 CONCACAF U-17 Championship. The top two teams of the tournament would have qualified for the 2021 FIFA U-20 Women's World Cup (originally 2020 but postponed due to COVID-19 pandemic) in Costa Rica as the CONCACAF representatives, along with Costa Rica who would have automatically qualified as hosts. The U-20 Women's World Cup was initially to be co-hosted with Panama, but they backed out from co-hosting due to COVID-19 concerns, due to having the highest cases and deaths in the region. The fourth CONCACAF team to qualify, which would have initially been Panama, was not confirmed. However, FIFA announced on 17 November 2020 that this edition of the World Cup would be cancelled.

The United States won the sixth titles, after defeated Mexico 4–1 in the final.

== Qualified teams ==
The qualifying format has changed since the 2018 edition, and the teams are no longer divided into regional zones.

The 41 CONCACAF teams were ranked based on the CONCACAF Women's Under-20 Ranking as of 2018. A total of 26 teams entered the tournament. The highest-ranked 16 entrants were exempt from qualifying and advanced directly to the group stage of the final tournament, while the lowest-ranked 10 entrants had to participate in the qualifying stage, where the four group winners and runners-up advanced to the round of 16 of the knockout stage of the final tournament.

On 13 January 2020, CONCACAF announced that Costa Rica and Panama, who had automatically qualified for the 2021 FIFA U-20 Women's World Cup as hosts, would no longer participate in the 2020 CONCACAF Women's U-20 Championship. As a result, the following changes to the tournament were made:

- Guyana (Qualifying Group A winner) and Saint Kitts and Nevis (Qualifying Group B winner), enter the group stage instead of the round of 16.
- Bermuda (Qualifying Group A third place) and Barbados (Qualifying Group B third place) enter the round of 16.

Round	Team	Qualification	Appearance	Previous best performance	Previous FIFA U-20 Women's World Cup appearances
Group stage	United States	1st ranked entrant	10th	Champions (2006, 2010, 2012, 2014, 2015)	9
Group stage	Mexico (title holders)	2nd ranked entrant	10th	Champions (2018)	8
Group stage	Canada	3rd ranked entrant	8th	Champions (2004, 2008)	7
Group stage	Haiti	4th ranked entrant	5th	Third place (2018)	1
Group stage	Jamaica	6th ranked entrant	10th	Fourth place (2006)	0
Group stage	Trinidad and Tobago	7th ranked entrant	9th	Fourth place (2014)	0
Group stage	Honduras	8th ranked entrant	3rd	Group stage (2014)	0
Group stage	Guatemala	9th ranked entrant	3rd	Group stage (2010, 2012)	0
Group stage	Nicaragua	11th ranked entrant	3rd	Group stage (2008)	0
Group stage	Dominican Republic (hosts)	12th ranked entrant	2nd	Group stage (2004)	0
Group stage	El Salvador	13th ranked entrant	1st	Debut	0
Group stage	Cuba	14th ranked entrant	4th	Group stage (2008, 2010)	0
Group stage	Puerto Rico	15th ranked entrant	1st	Debut	0
Group stage	Cayman Islands	16th ranked entrant	2nd	Group stage (2014)	0
Group stage	Guyana	Qualifying Group A winner	1st	Debut	0
Group stage	Saint Kitts and Nevis	Qualifying Group B winner	1st	Debut	0
Knockout stage	Saint Lucia	Qualifying Group A runner-up	1st	Debut	0
Knockout stage	Grenada	Qualifying Group B runner-up	1st	Debut	0
Knockout stage	Bermuda	Qualifying Group A third place	1st	Debut	0
Knockout stage	Barbados	Qualifying Group B third place	1st	Debut	0

== Venues ==
2020 CONCACAF Women's U-20 Championship is located in the Dominican Republic	Santo Domingo	San Cristóbal
2020 CONCACAF Women's U-20 Championship is located in the Dominican Republic	Estadio Olímpico Félix Sánchez	Estadio Panamericano
2020 CONCACAF Women's U-20 Championship is located in the Dominican Republic	Capacity: 27,000	Capacity: 2,800

== Draw ==
The draw for the group stage took place on 19 April 2019, 11:00 EDT (UTC−4), at the CONCACAF Headquarters in Miami. The 16 teams which entered the group stage were drawn into four groups of four teams. Based on the CONCACAF Women's Under-20 Ranking, the 16 teams were distributed into four pots, with teams in Pot 1 assigned to each group prior to the draw, as follows:

Pot 1	Pot 2	Pot 3	Pot 4
United States (Group C); Mexico (Group D); Canada (Group E); Haiti (Group F)	Costa Rica; Jamaica; Trinidad and Tobago; Honduras	Guatemala; Panama; Nicaragua; Dominican Republic	El Salvador; Cuba; Puerto Rico; Cayman Islands

Following the exclusion of Costa Rica and Panama from the tournament, their vacated positions in the group stage were replaced by Guyana and Saint Kitts and Nevis respectively. Furthermore, the vacated positions in the round of 16 of Guyana and Saint Kitts and Nevis were replaced by Bermuda and Barbados respectively.

== Squads ==
Players born on or after 1 January 2000 are eligible to compete. Each team must register a squad of 20 players, two of whom must be goalkeepers.

== Match officials ==
CONCACAF announced the appointment of the match officials on 14 February 2020.

== Group stage ==
The top three teams in each group advance to the round of 16, where they are joined by the four teams advancing from the qualifying stage.

Tiebreakers

The ranking of teams in each group is determined as follows (Regulations Article 12.8):

1. Points obtained in all group matches (three points for a win, one for a draw, zero for a loss);
2. Goal difference in all group matches;
3. Number of goals scored in all group matches;
4. Points obtained in the matches played between the teams in question;
5. Goal difference in the matches played between the teams in question;
6. Number of goals scored in the matches played between the teams in question;
7. Fair play points in all group matches (only one deduction could be applied to a player in a single match):
  - Yellow card: −1 points;
  - Indirect red card (second yellow card): −3 points;
  - Direct red card: −4 points;
  - Yellow card and direct red card: −5 points;
8. Drawing of lots.

All times are local, AST (UTC−4).

=== Group C ===
Pos	Team	Pld	W	D	L	GF	GA	GD	Pts	Qualification
1	United States	3	3	0	0	24	0	+24	9	Knockout stage
2	Dominican Republic (H)	3	1	1	1	7	4	+3	4	Knockout stage
3	Cuba	3	1	1	1	6	10	−4	4	Knockout stage
4	Honduras	3	0	0	3	1	24	−23	0	

Source: CONCACAF
Rules for classification: Group stage tiebreakers
(H) Hosts
22 February 2020
16:00

United States	9–0	Cuba
Fishel 9', 13', 42', 45+1'; Pinto 16', 90'; Spaanstra 37'; Yates 67'; Meza 68'	Report

Estadio Olímpico Félix Sánchez, Santo Domingo
Referee: Sandra Benítez (El Salvador)
22 February 2020
19:00

Honduras	0–7	Dominican Republic
	Report	Asenjo 4'; García 13'; Clase 17', 33'; A. Oviedo 57', 59'; Hallo 85'

Estadio Olímpico Félix Sánchez, Santo Domingo
Referee: Crystal Sobers (Trinidad and Tobago)

24 February 2020
16:00

Dominican Republic	0–4	United States
	Report	Fishel 3', 12'; Jarrett 8'; Pinto 65'

Estadio Olímpico Félix Sánchez, Santo Domingo
Referee: Katia García (Mexico)
24 February 2020
19:00

Cuba	6–1	Honduras
Mengana 22'; Céspedes 45', 58'; Guzmán 53' (o.g.); Rodríguez 70' (pen.); Aldana 74'	Report	Menjivar 55'

Estadio Olímpico Félix Sánchez, Santo Domingo
Referee: Marjorie Ponce (Nicaragua)

26 February 2020
16:00

Dominican Republic	0–0	Cuba
	Report

Estadio Olímpico Félix Sánchez, Santo Domingo
Referee: Astrid Gramajo (Guatemala)
26 February 2020
19:00

United States	11–0	Honduras
Rodman 14', 30', 34', 37', 72'; Holmes 17'; Duong 18'; Reyes 21' (o.g.); Yates 52', 70'; De la O 74' (o.g.)	Report

Estadio Olímpico Félix Sánchez, Santo Domingo
Referee: Odette Hamilton (Jamaica)

=== Group D ===
Pos	Team	Pld	W	D	L	GF	GA	GD	Pts	Qualification
1	Mexico	3	3	0	0	9	1	+8	9	Knockout stage
2	Guyana	3	2	0	1	5	5	0	6	Knockout stage
3	Puerto Rico	3	1	0	2	3	4	−1	3	Knockout stage
4	Nicaragua	3	0	0	3	1	8	−7	0	

Source: CONCACAF
Rules for classification: Group stage tiebreakers
23 February 2020
16:00

Mexico	2–1	Puerto Rico
González 50' (pen.), 90+4'	Report	Cimino 53'

Estadio Olímpico Félix Sánchez, Santo Domingo
Referee: Melissa Borjas (Honduras)
23 February 2020
19:00

Guyana	3–1	Nicaragua
Narine 19'; Vyfhuis 49'; McDonald 62'	Report	Gilday 64'

Estadio Olímpico Félix Sánchez, Santo Domingo
Referee: Suleimy Linares Sáez (Cuba)

25 February 2020
16:00

Puerto Rico	1–2	Guyana
Cimino 87'	Report	Roque 54' (o.g.); Narine 81'

Estadio Olímpico Félix Sánchez, Santo Domingo
Referee: Sandra Benítez (El Salvador)
25 February 2020
19:00

Nicaragua	0–4	Mexico
	Report	Juárez 21'; González 29'; Vázquez 64'; Madrid 77'

Estadio Olímpico Félix Sánchez, Santo Domingo
Referee: Crystal Sobers (Trinidad and Tobago)

27 February 2020
16:00

Nicaragua	0–1	Puerto Rico
	Report	Oquendo 77'

Estadio Olímpico Félix Sánchez, Santo Domingo
Referee: Sandra Benítez (El Salvador)
27 February 2020
19:00

Mexico	3–0	Guyana
Montoya 78', 87' (pen.); Román 90+3'	Report

Estadio Olímpico Félix Sánchez, Santo Domingo
Referee: Myriam Marcotte (Canada)

=== Group E ===
Pos	Team	Pld	W	D	L	GF	GA	GD	Pts	Qualification
1	Jamaica	3	2	1	0	11	6	+5	7	Knockout stage
2	Canada	3	1	1	1	3	3	0	4	Knockout stage
3	El Salvador	3	1	0	2	2	6	−4	3	Knockout stage
4	Guatemala	3	0	2	1	4	5	−1	2	

Source: CONCACAF
Rules for classification: Group stage tiebreakers
22 February 2020
13:00

Jamaica	4–4	Guatemala
Brown 50'; Fray 54', 68', 76'	Report	Ovando 12'; Álvarez 26' (pen.), 78'; Recinos 35'

Estadio Panamericano, San Cristóbal
Referee: Priscila Pérez (Mexico)
22 February 2020
16:00

Canada	2–0	El Salvador
Boychuk 57'; Novak 71'	Report

Estadio Panamericano, San Cristóbal
Referee: Karitza Guerra (Honduras)

24 February 2020
13:00

El Salvador	1–4	Jamaica
Rodriguez 45+3' (pen.)	Report	Brown 2', 11'; Murray 58'; Parker 82'

Estadio Panamericano, San Cristóbal
Referee: Astrid Gramajo (Guatemala)
24 February 2020
16:00

Guatemala	0–0	Canada
	Report

Estadio Panamericano, San Cristóbal
Referee: Tatiana Guzmán (Nicaragua)

26 February 2020
13:00

Guatemala	0–1	El Salvador
	Report	Gómez 2'

Estadio Panamericano, San Cristóbal
Referee: Suleimy Linares Sáez (Cuba)
26 February 2020
16:00

Canada	1–3	Jamaica
Boychuk 90+1'	Report	Brown 20'; Murray 80'; Fray 89'

Estadio Panamericano, San Cristóbal
Referee: Melissa Borjas (Honduras)

=== Group F ===
Pos	Team	Pld	W	D	L	GF	GA	GD	Pts	Qualification
1	Haiti	3	3	0	0	22	0	+22	9	Knockout stage
2	Trinidad and Tobago	3	2	0	1	8	7	+1	6	Knockout stage
3	Cayman Islands	3	1	0	2	3	12	−9	3	Knockout stage
4	Saint Kitts and Nevis	3	0	0	3	2	16	−14	0	

Source: CONCACAF
Rules for classification: Group stage tiebreakers
23 February 2020
13:00

Trinidad and Tobago	6–0	Saint Kitts and Nevis
Cornwall 3', 24', 45+3', 90+3'; Prince 46'; Serrant 58'	Report

Estadio Panamericano, San Cristóbal
Referee: Myriam Marcotte (Canada)
23 February 2020
16:00

Haiti	8–0	Cayman Islands
Dumornay 4', 86' (pen.); Pierre 8'; Ornis 24', 30'; F. Joseph 70', 75'; Surpris 89'	Report

Estadio Panamericano, San Cristóbal
Referee: Odette Hamilton (Jamaica)

25 February 2020
13:00

Cayman Islands	0–2	Trinidad and Tobago
	Report	Serrant 78'; Cornwall 90+5'

Estadio Panamericano, San Cristóbal
Referee: Priscila Pérez (Mexico)
25 February 2020
16:00

Saint Kitts and Nevis	0–7	Haiti
	Report	Dumornay 22' (pen.); Pierre 32', 40'; Louis 36', 46'; Dorce 41'; Marcellus 56'

Estadio Panamericano, San Cristóbal
Referee: Karitza Guerra (Honduras)

27 February 2020
13:00

Saint Kitts and Nevis	2–3	Cayman Islands
Bailey-Williams 4' (pen.); Marshall 70'	Report	Kehoe 17' (pen.); Bromfield 47', 84'

Estadio Panamericano, San Cristóbal
Referee: Katia García (Mexico)
27 February 2020
16:00

Haiti	7–0	Trinidad and Tobago
Dumornay 6', 16', 60'; Ornis 21', 39'; F. Joseph 22', 52'	Report

Estadio Panamericano, San Cristóbal
Referee: Tatiana Guzmán (Nicaragua)

== Knockout stage ==
In the knockout stage, if a match is level at the end of 90 minutes, extra time is played, and if still tied after extra time, the match is decided by a penalty shoot-out (Regulations Article 12.13).

=== Bracket ===
Round of 16
29 February – Santo Domingo
United States	6
Saint Lucia	0
29 February – San Cristóbal
Canada	6
Cuba	0
29 February – San Cristóbal
Jamaica	9
Bermuda	1
29 February – Santo Domingo
Dominican Republic	4
El Salvador	1
1 March – Santo Domingo
Mexico	12
Grenada	1
1 March – San Cristóbal
Trinidad and Tobago (p)	3 (5)
Puerto Rico	3 (4)
1 March – San Cristóbal
Haiti	12
Barbados	0
1 March – Santo Domingo
Guyana	2
Cayman Islands	0

Quarter-finals
4 March – Santo Domingo
United States	4
Canada	0
4 March – San Cristóbal
Jamaica	1
Dominican Republic	2
4 March – Santo Domingo
Mexico	4
Trinidad and Tobago	0
4 March – San Cristóbal
Haiti	3
Guyana	0

Semi-finals
6 March – Santo Domingo
United States	6
Dominican Republic	0
6 March – Santo Domingo
Mexico (p)	1 (4)
Haiti	1 (2)

Final
8 March – Santo Domingo
United States	4
Mexico	1

=== Round of 16 ===
29 February 2020
13:00

Jamaica	9–1	Bermuda
Murray 12'; Brown 13', 61', 76' (pen.), 90+1'; Able 41'; Parker 53'; Clarke 83', 88'	Report	Christopher 26'

Estadio Panamericano, San Cristóbal
Referee: Tatiana Guzmán (Nicaragua)

29 February 2020
16:00

United States	6–0	Saint Lucia
Fishel 8', 76'; Francis 14' (o.g.); Enge 24'; Pinto 35', 90'	Report

Estadio Olímpico Félix Sánchez, Santo Domingo
Referee: Sandra Benítez (El Salvador)

29 February 2020
16:00

Canada	6–0	Cuba
Boychuk 7' (pen.), 56' (pen.); Matamoro 36' (o.g.); Wilkinson 82', 83'; Portelance 90'	Report

Estadio Panamericano, San Cristóbal
Referee: Karitza Guerra (Honduras)

29 February 2020
19:00

Dominican Republic	4–1	El Salvador
J. Oviedo 37'; Asenjo 52', 78'; A. Oviedo 65'	Report	López 22'

Estadio Olímpico Félix Sánchez, Santo Domingo
Referee: Priscila Pérez (Mexico)

1 March 2020
13:00

Haiti	12–0	Barbados
E. Joseph 2'; Ornis 16', 38', 67'; Pierre 20'; Dumornay 24', 25', 33' (pen.), 52' (pen.); Mathurin 48'; Dorce 82'; Surpris 89'	Report

Estadio Panamericano, San Cristóbal
Referee: Crystal Sobers (Trinidad and Tobago)

1 March 2020
16:00

Mexico	12–1	Grenada
Román 11'; González 12', 26'; R. Reyes 21'; Valcin 36' (o.g.); McIntosh 56' (o.g.); Zempoalteca 58'; Juárez 72'; Pérez 73', 83'; M. Reyes 78'; Díaz 89'	Report	Charles 49'

Estadio Olímpico Félix Sánchez, Santo Domingo
Referee: Odette Hamilton (Jamaica)

1 March 2020
16:00

Trinidad and Tobago	3–3 (a.e.t.)	Puerto Rico
Cornwall 3', 43'; Serrant 106'	Report	Pardo 18'; Vázquez 24'; Torres 111'
Penalties
Fernández (penalty scored); De Gannes (penalty scored); Serrant (penalty scored); Paul (penalty scored); Cornwall (penalty scored)	5–4	(penalty scored) Vázquez; (penalty scored) Torres; (penalty scored) Oquendo; (penalty scored) Pardo; (penalty missed) Morales

Estadio Panamericano, San Cristóbal
Referee: Myriam Marcotte (Canada)

1 March 2020
19:00

Guyana	2–0	Cayman Islands
Narine 24', 55'	Report

Estadio Olímpico Félix Sánchez, Santo Domingo
Referee: Katia García (Mexico)

=== Quarter-finals ===
4 March 2020
13:00

Jamaica	1–2	Dominican Republic
Brown 37'	Report	García 35'; Asenjo 74'

Estadio Panamericano, San Cristóbal
Referee: Katia García (Mexico)

4 March 2020
15:00

United States	4–0	Canada
Fishel 35', 67'; Pinto 41'; Wesley 54'	Report

Estadio Olímpico Félix Sánchez, Santo Domingo
Referee: Melissa Borjas (Honduras)

4 March 2020
16:00

Haiti	3–0	Guyana
Dumornay 18', 54', 60'	Report

Estadio Panamericano, San Cristóbal
Referee: Astrid Gramajo (Guatemala)

4 March 2020
18:00

Mexico	4–0	Trinidad and Tobago
Vázquez 45+1'; Juárez 56'; González 67' (pen.); Manzo 71'	Report

Estadio Olímpico Félix Sánchez, Santo Domingo
Referee: Sandra Benítez (El Salvador)

=== Semi-finals ===
Winners qualified for 2021 FIFA U-20 Women's World Cup.

6 March 2020
15:00

United States	6–0	Dominican Republic
Pinto 2', 4', 20'; Rodman 16', 62'; Fishel 57'	Report

Estadio Olímpico Félix Sánchez, Santo Domingo
Referee: Tatiana Guzmán (Nicaragua)

6 March 2020
18:00

Mexico	1–1 (a.e.t.)	Haiti
Montoya 68'	Report	Dumornay 56'
Penalties
M. Reyes (penalty scored); Pérez (penalty scored); Soto (penalty scored); Juárez (penalty scored)	4–2	(penalty scored) Dumornay; (penalty scored) Ornis; (penalty missed) Étienne; (penalty missed) Pierre

Estadio Olímpico Félix Sánchez, Santo Domingo
Referee: Crystal Sobers (Trinidad and Tobago)

=== Final ===
8 March 2020
13:00

United States	4–1	Mexico
Rodman 12', 88'; Fishel 49', 57'	Report	Flores 6'

Estadio Olímpico Félix Sánchez, Santo Domingo
Referee: Sandra Benítez (El Salvador)

== Winners ==
2020 CONCACAF Women's U-20 Championship

United States
6th title

== Goalscorers ==
There were 198 goals scored in 39 matches, for an average of 5.08 goals per match.

14 goals

- (Haiti) Melchie Dumornay

13 goals

- (United States) Mia Fishel

9 goals

- (Jamaica) Jody Brown
- (United States) Brianna Pinto
- (United States) Trinity Rodman

7 goals

- (Haiti) Valentina Ornis
- (Trinidad and Tobago) Afiyah Cornwall

6 goals

- (Mexico) Alison González

4 goals

- (Canada) Tanya Boychuk
- (Dominican Republic) Mía Asenjo
- (Guyana) Audrey Narine
- (Haiti) Florsie Joseph
- (Haiti) Dayana Pierre
- (Jamaica) Marlee Fray

3 goals

- (Dominican Republic) Alyssa Oviedo
- (Jamaica) Lacey Murray
- (Mexico) Gabriela Juárez
- (Mexico) Joseline Montoya
- (Trinidad and Tobago) Maria-Frances Serrant
- (United States) Summer Yates

2 goals

- (Canada) Jazmine Wilkinson
- (Cayman Islands) Alexia Bromfield
- (Cuba) Analía Céspedes
- (Dominican Republic) Liliane Clase
- (Dominican Republic) Kristina García
- (Guatemala) Andrea Álvarez
- (Haiti) Mirlene Dorce
- (Haiti) Abaïna Louis
- (Haiti) Flero Surpris
- (Jamaica) Sydoney Clarke
- (Jamaica) Chantelle Parker
- (Mexico) Nicole Pérez
- (Mexico) Mariel Román
- (Mexico) Anette Vázquez
- (Puerto Rico) Gabrielle Cimino

1 goal

- (Bermuda) Nia Christopher
- (Canada) Kaila Novak
- (Canada) Léonie Portelance
- (Cayman Islands) Molly Kehoe
- (Cuba) Cecil Aldana
- (Cuba) Maristania Mengana
- (Cuba) Katheryn Rodríguez
- (Dominican Republic) Brieana Hallo
- (Dominican Republic) Jazlyn Oviedo
- (El Salvador) Samaria Gómez
- (El Salvador) Yoselyn López
- (El Salvador) Mara Rodriguez
- (Grenada) Sheranda Charles
- (Guatemala) Sandra Ovando
- (Guatemala) María Recinos
- (Guyana) Serena McDonald
- (Guyana) Jade Vyfhuis
- (Haiti) Esthericove Joseph
- (Haiti) Rose Alya Marcellus
- (Haiti) Ruthny Mathurin
- (Honduras) Maylin Menjivar
- (Jamaica) Nevillegail Able
- (Mexico) Nayeli Díaz
- (Mexico) Silvana Flores
- (Mexico) Yanín Madrid
- (Mexico) Destinee Manzo
- (Mexico) Maricarmen Reyes
- (Mexico) Reyna Reyes
- (Mexico) Karla Zempoalteca
- (Nicaragua) Jaclyn Gilday
- (Puerto Rico) Belerica Oquendo
- (Puerto Rico) Malina Pardo
- (Puerto Rico) Cristina Torres
- (Puerto Rico) Idelys Vázquez
- (Saint Kitts and Nevis) Iyanla Bailey-Williams
- (Saint Kitts and Nevis) Zonia Marshall
- (Trinidad and Tobago) Aaliyah Prince
- (United States) Katelyn Duong
- (United States) Sierra Enge
- (United States) Shae Holmes
- (United States) Rebecca Jarrett
- (United States) Samantha Meza
- (United States) Alexa Spaanstra
- (United States) Kennedy Wesley

1 own goal

- (Cuba) Alianne Matamoro (playing against Canada)
- (Grenada) Judy McIntosh (playing against Mexico)
- (Grenada) Treasher Valcin (playing against Mexico)
- (Honduras) Kerlyn de La O (playing against the United States)
- (Honduras) Giselle Guzmán (playing against Cuba)
- (Honduras) Linda Reyes (playing against the United States)
- (Puerto Rico) Cristina Roque (playing against Guyana)
- (Saint Lucia) Renala Francis (playing against the United States)

== Qualified teams for FIFA U-20 Women's World Cup ==
The following three teams from CONCACAF would have qualified for the 2021 FIFA U-20 Women's World Cup before the tournament was cancelled, including Costa Rica who would have qualified automatically as hosts. The fourth CONCACAF team to qualify for the 2021 FIFA U-20 Women's World Cup, which would initially have been co-hosts Panama (which had pulled out of hosting), was not confirmed.

Team	Qualified on	Previous appearances in FIFA U-20 Women's World Cup^{1}
Costa Rica	20 December 2019	2 (2010, 2014)
United States	6 March 2020	9 (**2002**, 2004, 2006, **2008**, 2010, **2012**, 2014, 2016, 2018)
Mexico	6 March 2020	8 (2002, 2006, 2008, 2010, 2012, 2014, 2016, 2018)

^{1} Bold indicates champions for that year. Italic indicates hosts for that year.

== Awards ==
The following awards were given at the conclusion of the tournament.

Golden Ball	Golden Boot	Golden Glove
(United States) Mia Fishel	(Haiti) Melchie Dumornay	(Mexico) Wendy Toledo
CONCACAF Fair Play Award
Mexico
