= Mónica Vergara =

Mexican football player and manager (born 1983)

Personal information
- Full name: Mónica Vergara Rubio
- Date of birth: 2 May 1983 (age 43)
- Place of birth: Guadalajara, Jalisco, Mexico
- Height: 1.75 m (5 ft 9 in)
- Position: Defender

International career
| Years | Team | Apps | (Gls) |
- Mexico

Managerial career
- 2014: Mexico women (assistant)
- 2014: Mexico U–15 women
- 2014–2016: Mexico U–17 women (assistant)
- 2015: Mexico women (assistant)
- 2016–2018: Mexico U–20 women (assistant)
- 2016: Mexico women (assistant)
- 2018–2019: Mexico U–17 women
- 2019–2020: Mexico U–20 women
- 2021–2022: Mexico women

Mónica Vergara Rubio (born 2 May 1983) is a Mexican professional football manager. Vergara is the former manager of the Mexico women's national football team. Before her manager career, Vergara was a member of the senior Mexico women's team, playing as a defender. Vergara also held positions as manager for the U-15, U-17, and U-20 Mexico women's national teams, leading the U-15 squad to a third-place finish at the Youth Olympic Games and, most notably, leading the U-17 team to the championship game of the 2018 FIFA U-17 Women's World Cup.

== International career ==
Vergara represented Mexico at the senior level, competing at the 2004 Summer Olympics in Athens, Greece, where the team finished in eighth place.

== Managerial career ==
=== Mexico U-15 women's national football team ===
On August 26, 2014, Vergara led the Mexico U-15 women's national team to a bronze medal at the 2014 Summer Youth Olympic Games after beating Slovakia 3–1 in the third-place match. Three days prior, Mexico fell to Venezuela in penalty kicks, 3–4, after the game ended in a draw, 1-1.

=== Mexico U-17 women's national football team ===
On June 12, 2018, Mexico U-17 women's national football team finished as Runners-up at the 2018 CONCACAF Women's U-17 Championship.

On December 1, 2018, Mexico U-17 women's national football team finished as Runners-up at the 2018 FIFA U-17 Women's World Cup, falling to Spain in the Final, 1–2.

=== Mexico U-20 women's national football team ===
On March 8, 2020, Mexico U-20 women's national football team finished as Runners-up at the 2020 CONCACAF Women's U-20 Championship. With this result, the team qualified for the 2020 FIFA U-20 Women's World Cup, which was later postponed to 2021 and eventually canceled due to the COVID-19 pandemic.

=== Mexico senior women's national football team ===
Vergara was named head coach of the senior team on January 19, 2021. She was sacked on August 15, 2022, after Mexico failed to qualify to the 2023 FIFA Women's World Cup during the 2022 CONCACAF W Championship.

== Honors ==
=== Manager ===
Mexico U-15 women's national football team

- Youth Olympic Games: Third-Place (2014)

Mexico U-17 women's national football team

- CONCACAF Women's U-17 Championship: Runners-up (2018)
- FIFA U-17 Women's World Cup: Runners-up (2018)

Mexico U-20 women's national football team

- CONCACAF Women's U-20 Championship: Runners-up (2020)
