= Nayeli (given name) =

- Gender: feminine

Origin
- Origin: Zapotec

Other names
- See also: Anayeli, Anyeli, Anyely, Nayelie, Nayelii, Nayelis, Nayeliz, Nayelli, Nayely, Nyeli, Nyelli, Nyellie

Nayeli is a feminine given name of Zapotec origin of uncertain meaning. It has been used primarily in the Hispanic community in the United States as well as in Mexico.

The name has been among the one thousand most used names for girls in the United States since 1993. The name has also been used in Spain since 2000.

== Notable people ==
- Nayeli Díaz (born 2001), Mexican footballer
- Nayeli Rangel (born 1992), Mexican footballer
