= Raven Edwards-Dowdall =

Guyanese footballer (born 2000)

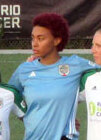
- Edwards-Dowdall in 2024

Personal information
- Date of birth: 14 May 2000 (age 26)
- Place of birth: Toronto, Ontario, Canada
- Height: 1.78 m (5 ft 10 in)
- Position: Goalkeeper

Team information
- Current team: North Toronto Nitros

College career
| Years | Team | Apps | (Gls) |
| 2018–2022 | Seneca Sting | 31 | (0) |

Senior career*
| Years | Team | Apps | (Gls) |
| 2016 | Vaughan Azzurri | 1 | (0) |
| 2022 | North Toronto Nitros | 12 | (0) |
| 2023 | FC Carmen București | | |
| 2023– | North Toronto Nitros | 22 | (0) |
| 2024– | → North Toronto Nitros B | 2 | (0) |

International career^{‡}
| 2020 | Guyana U20 | 2 | (0) |
| 2022– | Guyana | 1 | (0) |
- * Club domestic league appearances and goals as of 4 August 2025 ‡ National team caps and goals as of 20 February 2022

Raven Edwards-Dowdall (born 14 May 2000) is a footballer who plays as a goalkeeper for the North Toronto Nitros in League1 Ontario. Born in Canada, she plays for the Guyana women's national team.

== College career ==
Edwards-Dowdall attended college at Seneca College, where she played for the women's team. In 2022, she was named the OCAA Women's Indoor Championship MVP and OCAA Women's Indoor Championship Top Goalkeeper.

== Club career ==
In 2016, she played a match with Vaughan Azzurri in League1 Ontario.

In 2022, she played for the North Toronto Nitros in League1 Ontario.

In March 2023, she signed with Romanian club FC Carmen București.

She then returned to the Nitros for the 2023 season.

== International career ==
In 2020, she represented Guyana U20 at the 2020 CONCACAF Women's U-20 Championship, being named to the national side for the first time.

In 2022, she was named to the Guyana national team.
