= Serena McDonald =

Canadian-Guyanese footballer (born 2002)

Personal information
- Date of birth: 1 August 2002 (age 24)
- Place of birth: Canada
- Height: 1.57 m (5 ft 2 in)
- Position: Midfielder

Team information
- Current team: Pickering FC
- Number: 18

Youth career
- Ajax SC

College career
Years	Team	Apps	(Gls)
2021–	York Lions	22	(1)

Senior career*
Years	Team	Apps	(Gls)
2021	Vaughan Azzurri	1	(0)
2022	Pickering FC	17	(1)
2024–	Pickering FC	1	(0)

International career^{‡}
2020	Guyana U20		
2021–	Guyana	2+	(0+)
- * Club domestic league appearances and goals as of April 26, 2024 ‡ National team caps and goals as of 31 December 2021

Serena McDonald (born 1 August 2002) is a footballer who plays as a midfielder for Pickering FC in League1 Ontario. Born in Canada, she plays for the Guyana women's national team.

== Early life ==
McDonald played youth soccer with Ajax SC.

== Club career ==
In 2021, McDonald played with Vaughan Azzurri in League1 Ontario, making one appearance.

In 2022, she joined Pickering FC.

== International career ==
McDonald represented Guyana U20 at the 2020 CONCACAF Women's U-20 Championship, scoring her first goal on February 23 against Nicaragua U20.

In 2021, McDonald was named to the senior roster ahead of friendly matches against Puerto Rico. On October 20, she made her debut in a 6–1 loss to Puerto Rico.

== See also ==
- List of Guyana women's international footballers
