= Julia Rodríguez =

Puerto Rican footballer

Personal information
- Full name: Julia Lynn Rodríguez
- Date of birth: 5 October 2001 (age 25)
- Height: 1.57 m (5 ft 2 in)
- Position: Defender

Youth career
- Timber Creek Wolves

College career
Years	Team	Apps	(Gls)
2020–2021	Tampa Spartans	4	(0)

International career^{‡}
2018	Puerto Rico U17	2	(0)
2020	Puerto Rico U20	4	(0)
2021–	Puerto Rico	1	(0)
- ‡ National team caps and goals as of 18 February 2021

Julia Lynn Rodríguez (born 5 October 2001) is a Puerto Rican footballer who plays as a defender for the Puerto Rico women's national team. Rodríguez was raised in Orlando, Florida. Rodríguez has attended the Timber Creek High School in Orlando, Florida and the University of Tampa in Tampa, Florida. Rodríguez represented Puerto Rico at the 2018 CONCACAF Women's U-17 Championship and the 2020 CONCACAF Women's U-20 Championship. She made her senior debut on 18 February 2021 in a friendly away match against the Dominican Republic.
