= 2020 League1 Ontario season (women) =

League1 Ontario Women's Division
- Season: 2020
- Dates: April 25 – August 16 (planned)

The 2020 League1 Ontario season was supposed to be the sixth season of play for Women's Division of League1 Ontario, a Division 3 women's soccer league in the Canadian soccer pyramid and the highest level of soccer based in the Canadian province of Ontario.

On March 20, 2020, L1O postponed the start of the season due to the COVID-19 pandemic. On June 6, 2020, the league announced the cancellation of the "summer season" while also mentioning the possibility of returning in September 2020 for a shortened "fall season", though this was later ruled out.

== Format ==
For the regular season, each team would have played every other team once for a total of 12 matches. The playoff format would have included the top 8 teams, facing each other over 3 rounds, with the difference that the games will now be played over a single leg, instead of two.

League1 Ontario and the Première Ligue de soccer du Québec had planned to hold a Final Four end-of-season tournament for the women's divisions, from August 14 to 16, pitting the top two sides from each league in an inter-provincial playoff.

The L1O season was scheduled to start on April 25, and end with the Playoffs Final on August 8, with the L1O-PLSQ series scheduled for August 14 to 16.

== Clubs ==
The women's division consists of 13 teams, a decrease from 14 teams in 2019. North Toronto Nitros added a women's team for the first time, while Ottawa South United moved to the PLSQ and DeRo United FC did not return. Durham United FA re-branded as Pickering FC.

The following clubs were set to participate in the league prior to the season's cancellation.

Team	City	Principal stadium
Alliance United FC	Markham	Mount Joy & Centennial College
Aurora FC	Aurora	Stewart Burnett Park
Darby FC	Whitby	Whitby Soccer Centre & Darlington Field
Hamilton United	Hamilton	Ron Joyce Stadium & Tim Hortons Field
FC Oshawa	Oshawa	Civic Stadium
FC London	London	German Canadian Club
North Mississauga SC	Mississauga	Paramount Fine Foods Centre
North Toronto Nitros	Toronto	Downsview Turf
Oakville Blue Devils	Oakville	Sheridan Trafalgar Stadium
Pickering FC	Pickering	Kinsmen Park
Unionville Milliken SC	Markham	Azzurri Village & Mount Joy
Vaughan Azzurri	Vaughan	North Maple Regional Park
Woodbridge Strikers	Vaughan	Vaughan Grove

== Reserve Division ==
After introducing the Reserve Division during the 2019 men's season, it was set to be added to the women's division for the 2020 season. All of the clubs in L1O would be required to field a club in the division, while some other Ontario soccer clubs who did not have a team in the league were invited to field teams in the U21 Reserve division.

East	West
Aurora FC Reserves	FC London Reserves
Darby FC Reserves	Hamilton United Reserves
FC Durham U21	Oakville Blue Devils Reserves
North Mississauga Reserves	Oakville SC U21
Pickering FC Reserves	Tecumseh SC U21
Unionville Milliken Reserves	Vaughan Azzurri Reserves B
Vaughan Azzurri Reserves A	Waterloo United U21
Woodbridge Strikers Reserves	Whitecaps London U21
