= Nailah Rowe =

Guyanese footballer (born 2001)

Personal information
- Date of birth: 10 September 2001 (age 25)
- Place of birth: Canada
- Height: 1.57 m (5 ft 2 in)
- Position: Forward

Team information
- Current team: Centennial Colts
- Number: 2

College career
Years	Team	Apps	(Gls)
2019–	Centennial Colts	15	(21)

Senior career*
Years	Team	Apps	(Gls)
2019	FC Oshawa	8	(2)

International career^{‡}
2019–2020	Guyana U20	9	(1)
2018	Guyana	2+	(0+)
- * Club domestic league appearances and goals as of 16 October 2019 ‡ National team caps and goals as of 4 March 2020

Nailah Rowe (born 10 September 2001) is a footballer who plays as a forward for the Centennial Colts. Born in Canada, she represents the Guyana women's national team.

== College career ==
In 2019, she began attending Centennial College playing for the women's soccer team. In her first year, she scored 12 goals in nine games. She finished as the 2019 OCAA Rookie of the Year, OCAA East Rookie of the Year, OCAA East Co-Scoring Champion, and was named an OCAA East 1st Team All-Star. On 21 September 2021, she scored four goals against Fleming College. In her second season in 2021, she was named East Division Player of the Year and an East Division All-Star, after scoring nine goals in six games.

== Club career ==
In 2019, Rowe played for FC Oshawa in League1 Ontario, scoring twice in 8 league matches and making 1 playoff appearance. She scored her first goal on 10 May against Hamilton United.

== International career ==
Rowe made her debut for the Guyana senior team at the 2018 CFU Women's Challenge Series on 25 April against Grenada.

Rowe represented Guyana at the 2020 CONCACAF Women's U-20 Championship qualifying stage and 2020 CONCACAF Women's U-20 Championship. She scored her first goal on 19 July 2019, at the qualifying tournament against Saint Lucia U20.

== See also ==
- List of Guyana women's international footballers
