= Quinn Josiah =

Saint Kitts and Nevis footballer (born 2000)

Personal information
- Date of birth: 4 May 2000 (age 26)
- Place of birth: Newmarket, Ontario, Canada
- Height: 1.68 m (5 ft 6 in)
- Position: Goalkeeper

Youth career
- Aurora FC

College career
| Years | Team | Apps | (Gls) |
| 2018–2021 | Prairie View A&M Lady Panthers | 53 | (0) |

Senior career*
| Years | Team | Apps | (Gls) |
| 2016–2018 | Aurora FC | 8 | (0) |
| 2019 | Vaughan Azzurri | 0 | (0) |

International career^{‡}
| 2019 | Saint Kitts and Nevis U20 | 1+ | (0) |
| 2020– | Saint Kitts and Nevis | 2 | (0) |
- * Club domestic league appearances and goals as of 23 February 2020 ‡ National team caps and goals as of 23 February 2020

Quinn Josiah (born 4 May 2000) is a footballer who plays as a goalkeeper. She played for American college Prairie View A&M Lady Panthers. Born in Canada, she plays for the Saint Kitts and Nevis women's national team.

== College career ==
In 2018, she committed to Prairie View A&M University to play for the Prairie View A&M Lady Panthers women's soccer team. In her freshman season, she stated 19 games, including a 20 save performance against the McNeese State Cowgirls on August 17, 2018. In 2019, she was a Second-Team All-SWAC. She won the SWAC title in 2019 and was named to the All-Tournament team. In the spring of 2021, she was named the SWAC Preseason Goalkeeper of the Year, and later earning Goalkeeper of the Week honours in March. She was once again named to the All-Tournament team as the Panthers captured their second SWAC title in three years.

== Club career ==
From 2016 to 2018, she played for Aurora FC in League1 Ontario. She made her debut on May 7, 2016 against Vaughan Azzurri.

In 2019, she appeared in a playoff game with Vaughan Azzurri, keeping a clean sheet in a 6-0 victory over Alliance United FC.

== International career ==
Josiah was named to the Saint Kitts and Nevis under-20 national team for the 2020 CONCACAF Women's U-20 Championship qualification.

She has also been capped to the senior national team, making her debut in the 2020 CONCACAF Women's Olympic Qualifying Championship on 4 February 2020 against Jamaica.
