= Gabon women's national under-20 football team =

Gabon Under-20
- Association: Gabonese Football Federation
- Confederation: CAF
- Sub-confederation: UNIFFAC (Central Africa)
- FIFA code: GAB
First colours	Second colours

African U-20 World Cup qualification
- Appearances: 2 (first in 2015)
- Best result: Round 2 (2022)

FIFA U-20 Women's World Cup
- Appearances: None

The Gabon women's national under-20 football team represents Gabon in international youth women's football competitions.

The team competed in the 2019 Sud Ladies Cup held in France.

== Competitive record ==
=== FIFA U-20 Women's World Cup record ===
FIFA U-20 Women's World Cup
Year	Result	Matches	Wins	Draws*	Losses	GF	GA
(Canada) 2002	Did not qualify						
(Thailand) 2004	Did not qualify						
(Russia) 2006	Did not qualify						
(Chile) 2008	Did not qualify						
(Germany) 2010	Did not qualify						
(Japan) 2012	Did not qualify						
(Canada) 2014	Did not qualify						
(Papua New Guinea) 2016	Did not qualify						
(France) 2018	Did not qualify						
(Costa Rica) 2022	Did not qualify						
(Colombia) 2024	Did not qualify						
(Poland) 2026	To be determined						
Total	0/12	0	0	0	0	0	0

== See also ==
- Gabon women's national football team
