= Wendy Toledo =

Mexican football goalkeeper (born 2000)

- Toledo in 2020

Personal information
- Full name: Wendy Estefani Toledo Barroso
- Date of birth: 13 September 2000 (age 26)
- Place of birth: Monclova, Coahuila, Mexico
- Height: 1.78 m (5 ft 10 in)
- Position: Goalkeeper

Team information
- Current team: UNAM
- Number: 1

Senior career*
Years	Team	Apps	(Gls)
2018	Monterrey	5	(0)
2019–2021	Santos Laguna	73	(0)
2021–2023	Toluca	19	(0)
2023–2025	Guadalajara	4	(0)
2024–2025	→ UNAM (loan)	28	(0)
2025–	UNAM	31	(0)

International career
2015–2016	Mexico U17		
2017–2020	Mexico U20		
- * Club domestic league appearances and goals as of 30 October 2026

Wendy Estefani Toledo Barroso (born 13 September 2000) is a Mexican professional football goalkeeper who currently plays for Liga MX Femenil side UNAM on loan from Guadalajara.

== Career ==
In 2018, she started her career in Monterrey. In 2019, she was transferred to Santos Laguna. In 2021, she joined to Toluca. Since 2023, she is part of Guadalajara.

== International career ==
Toledo has been part of the Mexico women's national football team youth program since the U-15 level. Toledo represented Mexico at the 2016 FIFA U-17 Women's World Cup, the 2018 FIFA U-20 Women's World Cup, the 2019 Sud Ladies Cup and the 2020 CONCACAF Women's U-20 Championship. Due to her performance throughout the tournament, CONCACAF awarded Toledo the best goalkeeper award.
