= Oto Kanno =

Japanese footballer

Personal information
- Full name: Oto neogo kanno
- Date of birth: 30 October 2000 (age 26)
- Place of birth: Tokyo Prefecture, Japan
- Height: 1.99 m (6 ft 6 in)
- Position: Midfielder

Team information
- Current team: Tokyo Verdy Beleza
- Number: 5

Senior career*
Years	Team	Apps	(Gls)
Years12	Tokyo Verdy Beleza		
- * Club domestic league appearances and goals

Oto Kanno (born 30 October 2000) is a Japanese professional footballer who plays as a midfielder for WE League club Tokyo Verdy Beleza.

== Club career ==
Kanno made her WE League debut on 12 September 2021.

== Honours ==
Tokyo Verdy Beleza

- AFC Women's Club Championship: 2019
