= 2020 CONCACAF Women's U-20 Championship qualification =

2020 CONCACAF Women's U-20 Championship qualifying stage
Tournament details
- Host countries: Guyana (Group A); Saint Kitts and Nevis (Group B)
- Dates: 13–21 July 2019
- Teams: 10 (from 1 confederation)

Tournament statistics
- Matches played: 20
- Goals scored: 70 (3.5 per match)

The 2020 CONCACAF Women's U-20 Championship qualifying stage took place between 13–21 July 2019. The teams competed for four of the 20 berths in the 2020 CONCACAF Women's U-20 Championship final tournament.

Players born on or after 1 January 2000 are eligible to compete.

== Teams ==
The qualifying format changed from the 2018 edition, and the teams were no longer divided into regional zones.

The 41 CONCACAF teams were ranked based on the CONCACAF Women’s Under-20 Ranking as of 2018. A total of 26 teams entered the tournament. The highest-ranked 16 entrants were exempt from qualifying and advanced directly to the group stage of the final tournament, while the lowest-ranked 10 entrants participated in the qualifying stage, where the two group winners and the two group runners-up advanced to the round of 16 of the knockout stage of the final tournament.

Exempt from qualifying (16 teams)
Rank	Team	Points
1	United States	6,838
2	Mexico	5,769
3	Canada	4,496
4	Haiti	2,788
5	Costa Rica	2,575
6	Jamaica	2,500
7	Trinidad and Tobago	2,232
8	Honduras	1,583
9	Guatemala	1,420
10	Panama	1,356
11	Nicaragua	1,083
12	Dominican Republic	914
13	El Salvador	822
14	Cuba	777
15	Puerto Rico	757
16	Cayman Islands	462

Participating in qualifying stage (10 teams)
Rank	Team	Points
17	Bermuda	392
18	Anguilla	279
19	Antigua and Barbuda	305
21	Saint Kitts and Nevis	245
22	Grenada	224
23	Guyana	197
24	Saint Vincent and the Grenadines	193
25	Suriname	175
29	Saint Lucia	31
33	Barbados	0

Did not enter tournament (15 teams)
Rank	Team	Points
20	Curaçao	293
26	Dominica	169
27	Belize	136
28	Bonaire (Note: Non-FIFA members and thus ineligible to play in World Cup.)	41
30	British Virgin Islands	23
31	Aruba	16
32	Bahamas	0
34	French Guiana	0
35	Guadeloupe	0
36	Martinique	0
37	Montserrat	0
38	Sint Maarten	0
39	Saint Martin	0
40	Turks and Caicos Islands	0
41	U.S. Virgin Islands	0

== Draw ==
The draw for the qualifying stage took place on 19 April 2019, 11:00 EDT (UTC−4), at the CONCACAF Headquarters in Miami. The 10 teams which entered the qualifying stage were drawn into two groups of five teams. Based on the CONCACAF Women's Under-20 Ranking, the 10 teams were distributed into five pots, as follows:

Pot 1	Pot 2	Pot 3	Pot 4	Pot 5
Bermuda; Anguilla	Antigua and Barbuda; Saint Kitts and Nevis	Grenada; Guyana	Saint Vincent and the Grenadines; Suriname	Saint Lucia; Barbados

== Qualifying stage ==
The winners and runners-up of each group qualified for the final tournament, where they will enter the round of 16 of the knockout stage.

Tiebreakers

The ranking of teams in each group is determined as follows (Regulations Article 12.4):

1. Points obtained in all group matches (three points for a win, one for a draw, zero for a loss);
2. Goal difference in all group matches;
3. Number of goals scored in all group matches;
4. Points obtained in the matches played between the teams in question;
5. Goal difference in the matches played between the teams in question;
6. Number of goals scored in the matches played between the teams in question;
7. Fair play points in all group matches (only one deduction could be applied to a player in a single match):
  - Yellow card: −1 points;
  - Indirect red card (second yellow card): −3 points;
  - Direct red card: −4 points;
  - Yellow card and direct red card: −5 points;
8. Drawing of lots.

=== Group A ===
Matches were played at the Synthetic Track and Field Facility, Leonora in Guyana. All times are local, AST (UTC−4).

Pos	Team	Pld	W	D	L	GF	GA	GD	Pts	Qualification
1	Guyana (H)	4	4	0	0	9	1	+8	12	2020 CONCACAF Women's U-20 Championship
2	Saint Lucia	4	3	0	1	9	7	+2	9	2020 CONCACAF Women's U-20 Championship
3	Bermuda	4	2	0	2	12	6	+6	6	2020 CONCACAF Women's U-20 Championship (Note: The third-placed teams of the two qualifying groups qualified for the final tournament as replacements of Costa Rica and Panama, which had automatically qualified for the 2020 FIFA U-20 Women's World Cup as hosts, and thus would no longer participate in the 2020 CONCACAF Women's U-20 Championship.)
4	Suriname	4	1	0	3	10	14	−4	3	
5	Antigua and Barbuda	4	0	0	4	3	15	−12	0	

Source: CONCACAF
Rules for classification: Qualifying stage tiebreakers
(H) Hosts
Notes:
13 July 2019
18:00

Suriname	3–4	Saint Lucia
	Report	Britanya St Prix 14'; Tanika Bernard 28', 57', 64'

Synthetic Track and Field Facility, Leonora
13 July 2019
20:30

Guyana	2–0	Bermuda
Knight 29', 90+2'	Report

Synthetic Track and Field Facility, Leonora

15 July 2019
18:00

Saint Lucia	2–1	Bermuda
Krysan St. Louis 10', 13'	Report

Synthetic Track and Field Facility, Leonora
15 July 2019
20:30

Antigua and Barbuda	0–2	Guyana
	Report	Smith 24'; Khedoo 60'

Synthetic Track and Field Facility, Leonora

17 July 2019
18:00

Antigua and Barbuda	1–3	Saint Lucia
	Report

Synthetic Track and Field Facility, Leonora
17 July 2019
20:30

Bermuda	6–1	Suriname
	Report

Synthetic Track and Field Facility, Leonora

19 July 2019
18:00

Suriname	5–1	Antigua and Barbuda
	Report

Synthetic Track and Field Facility, Leonora
19 July 2019
20:30

Saint Lucia	0–2	Guyana
	Report	Smith 19'; Rowe 73'

Synthetic Track and Field Facility, Leonora

21 July 2019
16:00

Guyana	3–1	Suriname
Smith 6'; DeNobrega 12'; Desa 39'	Report

Synthetic Track and Field Facility, Leonora
21 July 2019
18:30

Antigua and Barbuda	1–5	Bermuda
	Report

Synthetic Track and Field Facility, Leonora

=== Group B ===
Matches were played at the Warner Park Sporting Complex, Basseterre in Saint Kitts and Nevis. All times are local, AST (UTC−4).

Pos	Team	Pld	W	D	L	GF	GA	GD	Pts	Qualification
1	Saint Kitts and Nevis (H)	4	4	0	0	14	2	+12	12	2020 CONCACAF Women's U-20 Championship
2	Grenada	4	3	0	1	9	3	+6	9	2020 CONCACAF Women's U-20 Championship
3	Barbados	4	2	0	2	5	5	0	6	2020 CONCACAF Women's U-20 Championship (Note: The third-placed teams of the two qualifying groups qualified for the final tournament as replacements of Costa Rica and Panama, which had automatically qualified for the 2020 FIFA U-20 Women's World Cup as hosts, and thus would no longer participate in the 2020 CONCACAF Women's U-20 Championship.)
4	Anguilla	4	0	1	3	0	8	−8	1	
5	Saint Vincent and the Grenadines	4	0	1	3	0	10	−10	1	

Source: CONCACAF
Rules for classification: Qualifying stage tiebreakers
(H) Hosts
Notes:
13 July 2019
16:30

Saint Vincent and the Grenadines	0–2	Barbados
	Report

Warner Park Sporting Complex, Basseterre
13 July 2019
19:00

Saint Kitts and Nevis	3–0	Anguilla
	Report

Warner Park Sporting Complex, Basseterre

15 July 2019
16:30

Barbados	2–0	Anguilla
	Report

Warner Park Sporting Complex, Basseterre
15 July 2019
19:00

Grenada	1–3	Saint Kitts and Nevis
	Report

Warner Park Sporting Complex, Basseterre

17 July 2019
16:30

Grenada	1–0	Barbados
	Report

Warner Park Sporting Complex, Basseterre
17 July 2019
19:00

Anguilla	0–0	Saint Vincent and the Grenadines
	Report

Warner Park Sporting Complex, Basseterre

19 July 2019
16:30

Saint Vincent and the Grenadines	0–4	Grenada
	Report

Warner Park Sporting Complex, Basseterre
19 July 2019
19:00

Barbados	1–4	Saint Kitts and Nevis
	Report

Warner Park Sporting Complex, Basseterre

21 July 2019
16:30

Grenada	3–0	Anguilla
	Report

Warner Park Sporting Complex, Basseterre
21 July 2019
19:00

Saint Kitts and Nevis	4–0	Saint Vincent and the Grenadines
	Report

Warner Park Sporting Complex, Basseterre
