= Ana Díaz (footballer) =

Puerto Rican footballer (born 2002)

Personal information
- Full name: Ana María Díaz Ríos
- Date of birth: August 26, 2002 (age 24)
- Place of birth: Atlanta, Georgia, U.S.
- Height: 1.60 m (5 ft 3 in)
- Position: Midfielder

Youth career
- 2013–2016: Concorde Fire Soccer Club
- 2016–2019: United Futbol Academy
- 2015–2017: Olympic Development Program (ODP)
- 2017–2019: U.S. Soccer Development Academy

College career
Years	Team	Apps	(Gls)
2020–2023	Georgia State Panthers	72	(3)

International career^{‡}
2020–2022	Puerto Rico U20	11	(0)
2019–	Puerto Rico	3	(0)
- ‡ National team caps and goals as of March 1, 2020

Ana María Díaz Ríos (born August 26, 2002) is a footballer who plays as a midfielder for the Georgia State Panthers. Born in the mainland United States, she represents Puerto Rico at international level.

== Early life ==
Díaz was raised in Johns Creek, Georgia.
