= Alianne Matamoros =

Cuban footballer (born 2000)

Personal information
- Full name: Alianne Matamoros Reyes
- Date of birth: 19 January 2000 (age 26)
- Place of birth: Cuba
- Position: Goalkeeper

Team information
- Current team: Municipal

Senior career*
Years	Team	Apps	(Gls)
- Municipal

International career
- Cuba
- * Club domestic league appearances and goals

Alianne Matamoros Reyes (born January 19, 2000) is a Cuban footballer who plays as a goalkeeper for Guatemalan club Municipal and the Cuba women's national team.

== Early life ==
Matamoros played volleyball as a child.

== Club career ==
Matamoros played for Cuban side Santiago de Cuba, where she was described as a "mainstay for Santiago de Cuba's runners-up finish in the national league". In 2023, she signed for Guatemalan side Municipal.

== International career ==
Matamoros plays for the Cuba women's national football team, where she has been regarded as one of the team's most important players.

== Style of play ==
Matamoros has been described as "her enviable size and fierce leadership on the field distinguish her from the rest of the soccer players".
