= Idelys Vázquez =

Puerto Rican footballer

Personal information
- Full name: Idelys Yarie Vázquez
- Date of birth: 21 September 2000 (age 26)
- Place of birth: Virginia Beach, Virginia, United States
- Height: 1.60 m (5 ft 3 in)
- Position: Forward

Youth career
- First Colonial High School
- Beach FC

College career
Years	Team	Apps	(Gls)
2018–2019	VCU Rams	38	(6)
2020–2022	FIU Panthers	38	(1)

International career^{‡}
2020	Puerto Rico U20	4	(1)
2021–	Puerto Rico	3	(2)
- ‡ National team caps and goals as of 20 October 2021

Idelys Yarie Vázquez (born 21 September 2000) is a Puerto Rican footballer who plays as a forward for the Puerto Rico women's national team.

== Early life ==
Vázquez was born in Virginia, raised in Virginia Beach to Puerto Rican parents.

== High school and college career ==
Vázquez has attended the First Colonial High School in Virginia Beach, Virginia, Virginia Commonwealth University in Richmond, Virginia and Florida International University in Miami, Florida.

== International career ==
Vázquez represented Puerto Rico at the 2020 CONCACAF Women's U-20 Championship. She made her senior debut on 18 February 2021 in a friendly away match against the Dominican Republic.

=== International goals ===
As of match played 20 October 2021. Scores and results list Puerto Rico's goal tally first, score column indicates score after each Vázquez goal.

List of international goals scored by Idelys Vázquez
No.	Date	Venue	Opponent	Score	Result	Competition	Ref.
1	18 February 2021	Estadio Olímpico Félix Sánchez, Santo Domingo, Dominican Republic	Dominican Republic	1–0	1–1	Friendly	
2	21 February 2021	Estadio Olímpico Félix Sánchez, Santo Domingo, Dominican Republic	Dominican Republic	2–0	2–0	Friendly	
