= Yanín Madrid =

Mexican footballer (born 2002)

Personal information
- Full name: Yanín Madrid López Lira
- Date of birth: 28 June 2002 (age 24)
- Place of birth: Pachuca, Hidalgo, Mexico
- Height: 1.64 m (5 ft 5 in)
- Position: Left-back

Team information
- Current team: Puebla
- Number: 17

Senior career*
| Years | Team | Apps | (Gls) |
| 2017–2025 | Pachuca | 163 | (11) |
| 2024 | → León (loan) | 13 | (1) |
| 2025– | Puebla | 8 | (1) |

International career
| 2019–2020 | Mexico U20 | | |
- * Club domestic league appearances and goals as of 2 February 2026

Yanín Madrid López Lira (born 28 June 2002) is a Mexican professional football Left-back who currently plays for Puebla of the Liga MX Femenil.

== Career ==
In 2017, Madrid started her career in Pachuca. In 2024, she was transferred to León.

== International career ==
=== Mexico U-20 women's national football team ===
On March 8, 2020, Mexico U-20 women's national football team finished as Runners-up at the 2020 CONCACAF Women's U-20 Championship.

== Honours ==
Mexico U-20

- CONCACAF Women's U-20 Championship: Runners-up: 2020
