= Kristina García =

Dominican footballer

Personal information
- Full name: Kristina Rachel García
- Date of birth: 20 February 2003 (age 23)
- Place of birth: Lexington, Kentucky, U.S.
- Height: 1.63 m (5 ft 4 in)
- Positions: Attacking midfielder; outside forward; centre forward

Team information
- Current team: Stony Brook Seawolves
- Number: 7

Youth career
- East Meadow SC
- Great Neck South High School

College career
Years	Team	Apps	(Gls)
2021–	Stony Brook Seawolves	38	(3)

International career^{‡}
2020–	Dominican Republic U20	1	(1)
2019–	Dominican Republic	3	(0)
- ‡ National team caps and goals as of 20 May 2025

Kristina Rachel García (born 20 February 2003) is a Dominican footballer who plays as an attacking midfielder for Stony Brook Seawolves and as a forward for the Dominican Republic women's national football team.

== College career ==
García had committed to join the Stony Brook Seawolves in 2021 to play football for them. García was a part of the Stony Brook Seahawks team that reached the final of the 2025 Coastal Athletics Association women's soccer tournament, but lost in the final to Elon Phoenix.

== International career ==
García has appeared for the Dominican Republic at the 2020 CONCACAF Women's Olympic Qualifying Championship qualification. García was part of the Dominican Republic women's under-20s team that reached the semi-finals of the 2020 CONCACAF Women's U-20 Championship.

García missed most of the 2021 season due to a leg injury but still attended the Dominican Republic trials. She found out she made the 2022 Dominican Republic senior squad for the 2022 CONCACAF W Championship qualification via scrolling through social media.

== Personal life ==
García was born in the United States to a Dominican mother and a Salvadoran father. García was born in Great Neck, New York and attended Great Neck South High School. After High School, García attended Stony Brook University to study political science. Her father has played in the El Salvador national team, debuting in 1980 as well as playing for El Salvador at the 1982 FIFA World Cup.. She has a brother, Jorey, who is also a footballer and he plays for the El Salvador national under-20 football team.
