= Destinee Manzo =

Mexican footballer (born 2000)

Personal information
- Full name: Destinee Noel Manzo Paolinetti
- Date of birth: 2 August 2000 (age 26)
- Place of birth: California, United States
- Height: 1.60 m (5 ft 3 in)
- Position: Winger

College career
Years	Team	Apps	(Gls)
2019–2022	UC Irvine Anteaters	64	(10)

Senior career*
Years	Team	Apps	(Gls)
2023	América	4	(0)
2024	Pachuca	12	(2)
2024	León	16	(0)

International career^{‡}
2019–2020	Mexico U-20	8	(5)
- * Club domestic league appearances and goals as of 29 February 2024 ‡ National team caps and goals as of 29 February 2024

Destinee Noel Manzo Paolinetti (born 2 August 2000) is a professional footballer who plays as a Winger for Liga MX Femenil side León. Born and raised in the United States, she represents Mexico internationally.

== Career ==
In 2023, she started her career in América. In 2024, she was transferred to Pachuca. In 2024, she joined León.

== International career ==
Manzo was part of the squad of Mexico U-20 women's national football team that finished as Runners-up at the 2020 CONCACAF Women's U-20 Championship.
