= Silvana Flores =

Mexican footballer (born 2002)

Personal information
- Full name: Silvana Flores Dorrell
- Date of birth: 18 April 2002 (age 24)
- Place of birth: Georgetown, Ontario, Canada
- Height: 1.65 m (5 ft 5 in)
- Position: Defensive midfielder

Team information
- Current team: Como

Youth career
- Georgetown SC
- Guelph SA
- Essex County FA
- Arsenal
- 2020–2021: Chelsea

Senior career*
Years	Team	Apps	(Gls)
2021	Reading	0	(0)
2021–2022	Tottenham Hotspur	0	(0)
2022	→ Ipswich Town (loan)		
2022–2024	Monterrey	12	(0)
2023	→ Mazatlán (loan)	6	(0)
2024	Pachuca	2	(0)
2025–2026	UNAM	45	(2)
2026–	Como	0	(0)

International career^{‡}
2018	Mexico U17	7	(0)
2019	Mexico U19	4	(0)
2020–2022	Mexico U20	7	(1)
2021	Mexico	1	(0)
Medal record
Women's football
Representing Mexico
Central American and Caribbean Games
Gold medal – first place	2026 Santo Domingo	Team
- * Club domestic league appearances and goals as of 31 January 2026 ‡ National team caps and goals as of 5 March 2022

Silvana Flores Dorrell (born 18 April 2002) is a professional footballer who plays as a midfielder for Serie A club Como. Born in Canada, she has represented Mexico at international level.

== Early life ==
Flores was born in Georgetown, Ontario, Canada to a Mexican father, Rubén Flores, and a Canadian mother of English descent. She began playing soccer at age 4 with Georgetown SC.

== Club career ==
After spending time in the academies of Arsenal and Chelsea, Flores joined Reading in February 2021. In the summer ahead of the 2021–22 FA WSL season, Flores transferred to Tottenham Hotspur.

She signed with Liga MX Femenil club Monterrey on June 16, 2022. She went on loan to Mazatlán on July 4, 2023, and returned to Monterrey on January 16, 2024.

In October 2026, she signed with Italian Serie A club Como.

== International career ==
When she was 11, Flores trained as a guest player with the Cayman Islands women's national under-15 football team, which was then coached by her father. She later attended some camps of the youth programs of Canada and England. By 2018, she had already chosen to play for Mexico internationally.

Flores represented Mexico at the 2018 FIFA U-17 Women's World Cup (Runner-Up), the 2019 Sud Ladies Cup and two CONCACAF Women's U-20 Championship editions (2020 and 2022). She made her senior debut on 23 February 2021 in a 0–0 friendly home draw against Costa Rica.

== Personal life ==
Flores' siblings Marcelo and Tatiana were also part of the Mexican men's and women's youth programs, respectively.

== Honours ==
Mexico U23

- Central American and Caribbean Gold Medal: 2026
