= Afiyah Cornwall =

Trinidad and Tobago footballer

Personal information
- Date of birth: 10 April 2002 (age 24)
- Position: Forward

Team information
- Current team: Waterloo Institute

Senior career*
Years	Team	Apps	(Gls)
–2019	QPCC		
2020–	Waterloo Institute		

International career^{‡}
2016	Trinidad and Tobago U-15		
2018	Trinidad and Tobago U-18 (futsal)		
2020–	Trinidad and Tobago U-20	4	(7)
2019–	Trinidad and Tobago	4	(1)
- * Club domestic league appearances and goals ‡ National team caps and goals as of 28 October 2025

Afiyah Cornwall (born 10 April 2002) is a Trinidad and Tobago footballer who plays as a forward for QPCC and the Trinidad and Tobago women's national team.

== International career ==
Cornwall represented Trinidad and Tobago at the 2016 CONCACAF Girls' U-15 Championship and the 2020 CONCACAF Women's U-20 Championship. At senior level, she played the 2020 CONCACAF Women's Olympic Qualifying Championship qualification.

=== International goals ===
Scores and results list Trinidad and Tobago goal tally first.

No.	Date	Venue	Opponent	Score	Result	Competition
1	30 September 2019	Ato Boldon Stadium, Couva, Trinidad and Tobago	Aruba	2–0	3–0	2020 CONCACAF Women's Olympic Qualifying Championship qualification
