= Mía Asenjo =

Dominican footballer (born 2003)

Personal information
- Full name: Mía Gayle Asenjo Mahabirsingh
- Birth name: Mia Gayle Asenjo
- Date of birth: 7 March 2003 (age 23)
- Place of birth: Valley Stream, New York, U.S.
- Height: 1.68 m (5 ft 6 in)
- Position: Left winger

Team information
- Current team: DUX Logroño

Youth career
- –2020: Montverde Academy
- –2020: Florida Krush

College career
Years	Team	Apps	(Gls)
2021–2024	UCF Knights	51	(5)

Senior career*
Years	Team	Apps	(Gls)
2022	Queensboro FC	12	(11)
2025–	DUX Logroño	24	(2)

International career^{‡}
2020	Dominican Republic U20	6	(4)
2021–	Dominican Republic	11	(7)
- * Club domestic league appearances and goals as of 14 April 2026 ‡ National team caps and goals as of 4 June 2024

Mía Gayle Asenjo Mahabirsingh (born 7 March 2003) is a professional footballer who plays as a left winger for Liga F club DUX Logroño. Born in the United States, she plays for the Dominican Republic national team.

== Early life ==
Asenjo was raised in Malverne, New York. Her father, Erick Asenjo, is Dominican and her mother, Kimberly 'Kim' Grant (née Mahabirsingh, formerly Asenjo), is American. Her parents are divorced.

== College career ==
On 20 November 2020, Asenjo committed to the University of Central Florida in Orlando, Florida. She was a redshirt freshman during the 2021 season. She debuted during the 2022 season, making 18 appearances.

== Club career ==
In 2022, after recovering from knee injuries, Asenjo played in the USL W League for Queensboro FC, where she was the team's leading scorer during the 2022 season with 11 goals in 12 matches, and was also nominated for USL W League player of the year and named to the league's team of the year.

== International career ==
Asenjo represented the Dominican Republic at the 2020 CONCACAF Women's U-20 Championship. She made her senior debut on 18 February 2021 in a friendly home match against Puerto Rico. While called up, Asenjo tore her anterior cruciate and medial collateral ligaments and meniscus in one of her knees, ruling her out for the 2021 NCAA season.

=== International goals ===
Scores and results list Dominican Republic's goal tally first

No.	Date	Venue	Opponent	Score	Result	Competition	Ref.
1	18 February 2021	Estadio Olímpico Félix Sánchez, Santo Domingo, Dominican Republic	Puerto Rico	1–1	1–1	Friendly	
2	6 March 2026	Raymond E. Guishard Technical Centre, The Valley, Anguilla	Anguilla	5–0	8–0	2026 CONCACAF W Championship qualification	
