= Crystal Sobers =

Trinidadian football referee (born 1981)

Crystal Sobers (born February 13, 1981) is a Trinidadian association football referee.

== Early life and education ==
Sobers was called to play for the Trinidad and Tobago national under-20 football team.

She studied business management.

== Career ==
Sobers has been known for "being among the top referees in the Trinidad and Tobago Pro League for a decade." She has refereed the CONCACAF W Championship.

Sobers mainly operated as a right-back.

== Personal life ==
Sobers is a resident of D'Abadie, Trinidad and Tobago.
