= Nayeli Díaz =

Mexican footballer (born 2001)

Personal information
- Full name: Nayeli Isela Díaz Díaz
- Date of birth: 10 October 2001 (age 25)
- Place of birth: Mexico City, Mexico
- Height: 1.75 m (5 ft 9 in)
- Position: Winger

Team information
- Current team: Santos Laguna
- Number: 25

Youth career
- 2015–2018: Bishop Amat Lancers

College career
Years	Team	Apps	(Gls)
2019–2022	Saint Mary's Gaels	49	(8)

Senior career*
Years	Team	Apps	(Gls)
2023	Oakland Soul SC	10	(6)
2024–2025	Pachuca	12	(0)
2026	UNAM	8	(0)
2026–	Santos Laguna	0	(0)

International career^{‡}
2017–2018	Mexico U17	15	(3)
2019	Mexico U19	5	(2)
2020	Mexico U20	6	(1)
2021–	Mexico	2	(0)
- * Club domestic league appearances and goals as of 17 April 2021. ‡ National team caps and goals as of 13 June 2021.

Nayeli Isela Díaz Díaz (born 10 October 2001) is a Mexican professional footballer who plays as a forward for Liga MX Femenil club Santos Laguna and the Mexico women's national team.

== Early life ==
Díaz was born in Mexico City and raised in Hacienda Heights, California, United States.

== High school and college career ==
Díaz has attended the Bishop Amat Memorial High School in La Puente, California and the Saint Mary's College of California in Moraga.

== International career ==
Díaz represented Mexico at the 2018 CONCACAF Women's U-17 Championship, the 2018 FIFA U-17 Women's World Cup, the 2019 Sud Ladies Cup and the 2020 CONCACAF Women's U-20 Championship. She made her senior debut on 13 June 2021 as an 84th-minute substitution in a 1–5 friendly away loss to Japan.
