= 2020 FIFA U-20 Women's World Cup =

10th edition of the FIFA U-20 Women's World Cup

Copa Mundial Femenina Sub-20 de la FIFA Costa Rica 2020

Tournament details
- Host country: Costa Rica and Panama
- Dates: Cancelled
- Teams: 16 (from 6 confederations)
- Venues: 3 (in 3 host cities)

The 2020 FIFA U-20 Women's World Cup, was originally going to be the 10th edition of the FIFA U-20 Women's World Cup, the biennial international women's youth football championship contested by the under-20 national teams of the member associations of FIFA, since its inception in 2002 as the FIFA U-19 Women's World Championship (the age limit was raised from 19 to 20 in 2008).

The tournament was originally scheduled to be held in August to September 2020 by Costa Rica and Panama, with the latter hosting its first FIFA tournament; this would have been the first FIFA youth tournament to be hosted by more than one country. However, due to the COVID-19 pandemic, FIFA announced on 3 April 2020 that the tournament would be postponed and rescheduled. On 12 May 2020, FIFA announced that the tournament would be held between 20 January – 6 February 2021, subject to further monitoring. In July 2020, due to COVID-19 concerns with the highest cases and deaths of all Central America, Panama backed out from co-hosting leaving Costa Rica the solo host.

On 17 November 2020, FIFA announced that the 2020 edition of the tournament would be cancelled. Instead, Costa Rica were appointed as hosts of the next edition of the tournament in 2022.

Japan were the defending champions, having won their first title in 2018.

== Host selection ==
=== First round of bidding ===
On 25 July 2018, FIFA announced that bidding process had begun for the 2020 FIFA U-20 Women's World Cup and the 2020 FIFA U-17 Women's World Cup. A member association was able to bid for both tournaments, with the caveat that two different hosts would be appointed. The following associations declared interest in hosting the event by the deadline of 12 September 2018.

- India
- South Korea

When India was appointed as the host of the U-17 Women's World Cup, they were then no longer eligible to be selected as host of the 2020 FIFA U-20 Women's World Cup.

=== Second round of bidding ===
- Costa Rica / Panama
- Nigeria

After India and South Korea withdrew their bids, the bid process was reopened. Nigeria was considered to be in the running, with FIFA expected to conduct an inspection tour in August.

In a meeting held with Carlos Alvarado Quesada (the President of Costa Rica), Rodolfo Villalobos (the president of the Costa Rican Football Federation), Gianni Infantino said "We raised the possibility that Costa Rica and Panama will host the FIFA Under-20 Women's World Cup in September 2020 and we have had a good reception of the news".

On 20 December 2019, FIFA announced that Costa Rica and Panama would host the tournament in August 2020.

== Qualified teams ==
A total of 16 teams would have qualified for the final tournament. In addition to Costa Rica who would have automatically qualified as host, 15 teams would have qualified from six continental competitions. Panama withdrew as co-host nation after 2020 CONCACAF Women's U-20 Championship, for this reason the spot vacancy for Concacaf was never defined.

Confederation	Qualifying tournament	Team	Appearance (planned)	Last appearance	Previous best performance
AFC (Asia) (3 teams)	2019 AFC U-19 Women's Championship	Japan	7th	2018	Champions (2018)
AFC (Asia) (3 teams)	2019 AFC U-19 Women's Championship	North Korea	8th	2018	Champions (2006, 2016)
AFC (Asia) (3 teams)	2019 AFC U-19 Women's Championship	South Korea	6th	2016	Third place (2010)
CAF (Africa) (2 teams)	2020 African U-20 Women's World Cup Qualifying Tournament	N/A			
CAF (Africa) (2 teams)	2020 African U-20 Women's World Cup Qualifying Tournament	N/A			
CONCACAF (Central, North America and Caribbean) (Hosts + 3 teams)	Host nation	Costa Rica	3rd	2014	Group stage (2010, 2014)
CONCACAF (Central, North America and Caribbean) (Hosts + 3 teams)	Host nation	~~Panama~~	~~1st~~	None	~~Debut~~
CONCACAF (Central, North America and Caribbean) (Hosts + 3 teams)	2020 CONCACAF Women's U-20 Championship	Mexico	9th	2018	Quarter-finals (2010, 2012, 2016)
CONCACAF (Central, North America and Caribbean) (Hosts + 3 teams)	2020 CONCACAF Women's U-20 Championship	United States	10th	2018	Champions (2002, 2008, 2012)
CONCACAF (Central, North America and Caribbean) (Hosts + 3 teams)	2020 CONCACAF Women's U-20 Championship	N/A			
CONMEBOL (South America) (2 teams)	2020 South American U-20 Women's Championship	N/A			
CONMEBOL (South America) (2 teams)	2020 South American U-20 Women's Championship	N/A			
OFC (Oceania) (1 team)	2019 OFC U-19 Women's Championship	New Zealand	8th	2018	Quarter-finals (2014)
UEFA (Europe) (4 teams)	2019 UEFA Women's Under-19 Championship	France	8th	2018	Runners-up (2016)
UEFA (Europe) (4 teams)	2019 UEFA Women's Under-19 Championship	Germany	10th	2018	Champions (2004, 2010, 2014)
UEFA (Europe) (4 teams)	2019 UEFA Women's Under-19 Championship	Netherlands	2nd	2018	Quarter-finals (2018)
UEFA (Europe) (4 teams)	2019 UEFA Women's Under-19 Championship	Spain	4th	2018	Runners-up (2018)

Notes

1. Withdrew its rights as host country.
