= Tori Paul =

Trinidad and Tobago footballer (born 2002)

Personal information
- Full name: Tori Nicole Paul
- Date of birth: 22 August 2002 (age 24)
- Place of birth: Richmond, Virginia, United States
- Height: 5 ft 4 in (1.63 m)
- Positions: Forward; midfielder

Youth career
- Charlotte Independence
- 2017–2020: Olympic Trojans

College career
Years	Team	Apps	(Gls)
2021	Maryland Terrapins	10	(0)
2022–2023	UTEP Miners	15	(0)

Senior career*
Years	Team	Apps	(Gls)
2022	Christos FC	2	(0)
2023	NC Fusion	4	(4)

International career^{‡}
2019–2022	Trinidad and Tobago U-20	6	(0)
2019–	Trinidad and Tobago	11	(1)
- * Club domestic league appearances and goals ‡ National team caps and goals as of 28 October 2025

Tori Nicole Paul (born 22 August 2002) is a professional footballer who plays as a midfielder and a forward for the Trinidad and Tobago women's national team. Born in the United States, she represents Trinidad and Tobago internationally.

== International career ==
Paul played for Trinidad and Tobago at senior level in the 2020 CONCACAF Women's Olympic Qualifying Championship qualification. She has also made appearances for the u20 Trinidad and Tobago Women's team in the 2020 and 2022 CONCACAF Women's Championship World Cup Qualifiers.
