= Sofía Ovando =

Guatemalan footballer

Personal information
- Full name: Sandra Sofía Ovando Monzón
- Date of birth: 20 July 2003 (age 23)
- Position: Defender

Team information
- Current team: Deportivo Xela Suchitepequez Femenil

Senior career*
Years	Team	Apps	(Gls)
- Deportivo Xela

International career^{‡}
2020	Guatemala U20	3	(1)
2021–	Guatemala	4	(0)
- * Club domestic league appearances and goals ‡ National team caps and goals as of 15 June 2021.

Sandra Sofía Ovando Monzón (born 20 July 2003), known as Sofía Ovando, is a Guatemalan footballer who plays as a defender for Deportivo Xela ,Suchitepequez femenil and the Guatemala women's national team.

== Club career ==
Ovando has played for Deportivo Xela in Guatemala.

== International career ==
Ovando made her senior debut for Guatemala on 16 February 2021 in a 3–1 friendly home win over Panama.
