= Karla Zempoalteca =

Mexican footballer (born 2000)

Personal information
- Full name: Karla Daniela Zempoalteca Hernández
- Date of birth: 18 May 2000 (age 26)
- Place of birth: Iztacalco, Mexico City, Mexico
- Height: 1.70 m (5 ft 7 in)
- Position: Centre back

Team information
- Current team: Giresun Sanayi
- Number: 4

Senior career*
Years	Team	Apps	(Gls)
2017	Pachuca	12	(0)
2018	Toluca	24	(2)
2019–2020	León	27	(1)
2020–2021	Cruz Azul	24	(3)
2022	Juárez	30	(1)
2023–2024	Atlas	26	(1)
2024–2025	León	11	(0)
2025–	Giresun Sanayi	2	(0)

International career^{‡}
2022	Mexico U-20		
- * Club domestic league appearances and goals as of 5 October 2025 ‡ National team caps and goals as of 14 July 2023

Karla Daniela Zempoalteca Hernández (born 18 May 2000) is a Mexican professional footballer who plays as a Centre back for Giresun Sanayi in the Turkish Super League.

== Club career ==
Zempoalteca started her career in 2018 with Pachuca. In 2018 she joined Toluca. In 2019 she was transferred to León. In 2020 she moved to Cruz Azul. In 2022 she was transferred to Juárez. In 2023 she moved to Atlas.

She played in the Liga MX Femenil side León.

In September 2025, she moved to Turkey, and signed with Giresun Sanayi, which was recently promoted to the Turkish Super League.

== International career ==
Zempoalteca was part of the squad of Mexico U-20 women's national football team that finished as Runners-up at the 2022 CONCACAF Women's U-20 Championship.
