= Danielle Etienne =

Haitian footballer (born 2001)

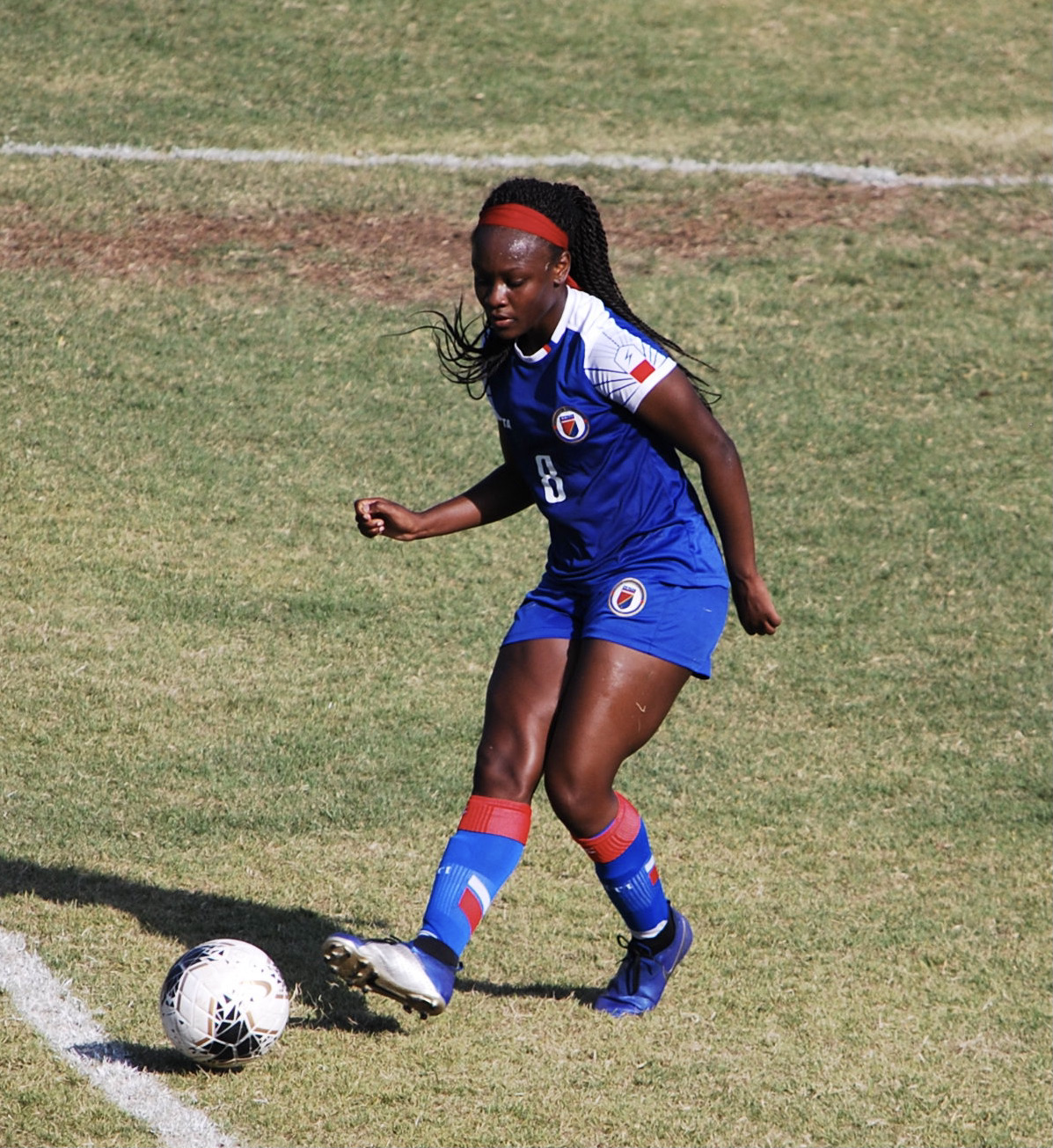
- Etienne with Haiti in 2020

Personal information
- Full name: Danielle Monique Etienne
- Date of birth: 16 January 2001 (age 25)
- Place of birth: Richmond, Virginia, U.S.
- Height: 1.60 m (5 ft 3 in)
- Position: Midfielder

Team information
- Current team: The Citadel Bulldogs
- Number: 7

Youth career
- Bethesda SC
- 2015–2016: Archbishop Spalding HS
- 2017–: New York City FC
- 2017–2018: Paramus Catholic HS

College career
Years	Team	Apps	(Gls)
2019–2022	Fordham Rams	31	(1)
2023–	The Citadel Bulldogs	16	(1)

International career
2017–2018	Haiti U17	7	(2)
2019	Haiti U19	5	(1)
2018–2020	Haiti U20	15	(3)
2019–	Haiti	15	(2)

Danielle Monique Etienne (born 16 January 2001) is a footballer who plays as a midfielder for Southern Conference team The Citadel Bulldogs. Born in the United States, she represents Haiti at international level.

== International career ==
Etienne represented the Haitian National Team at various levels. Etienne competed at the 2018 CONCACAF Women's U-17 Championship in Nicaragua, the 2018 CONCACAF Women's U-20 Championship in Trinidad and Tobago, the 2018 FIFA U-20 Women's World Cup in France, the 2020 CONCACAF Women's Olympic Qualifying Championship in the United States and the 2020 CONCACAF Women's U-20 Championship in the Dominican Republic. She made a senior appearance debut on October 3, 2019, vs. Suriname. Danielle scored her first goal for the senior women's team in Haiti's historic 21–0 win over the British Virgin Islands in 2023 World Cup Qualifiers. In February 2023, Etienne was called up to the senior team that again made history defeating Senegal and Chile in playoff matches in New Zealand securing their first ever appearance in the 2023 Fifa Women's World Cup Finals. Etienne competed in the 2023 FIFA Women's World Cup making an appearance against China in a 1–0 loss in the group stage.

== International goals ==
No.	Date	Venue	Opponent	Score	Result	Competition
1.	9 April 2022	A. O. Shirley Recreation Ground, Road Town, British Virgin Islands	British Virgin Islands	2–0	21–0	2022 CONCACAF W Championship qualification
2.	30 October 2023	SKNFA Technical Center, Basseterre, Saint Kitts and Nevis	Saint Kitts and Nevis	11–0	13–0	2024 CONCACAF W Gold Cup qualification

== Personal life ==
Etienne is the daughter of former Haitian International and Long Island Roughriders forward Derrick Etienne and the younger sister of Darice Etienne and Haitian International winger Derrick Etienne Jr. Danielle Etienne attended Paramus Catholic High School before joining Fordham University. Etienne returned to the national team two months after giving birth to her son Ezekiel, and earned a place in Haiti's final roster competing in the 2023 Fifa Women's World Cup Finals only seven months after giving birth.
