= Andrea Álvarez (footballer) =

Guatemalan footballer (born 2003)

Personal information
- Full name: Andrea Abigail Álvarez Donis
- Date of birth: 13 January 2003 (age 23)
- Place of birth: Guatemala City, Guatemala
- Position: Forward

Team information
- Current team: Sevilla
- Number: 8

Senior career*
Years	Team	Apps	(Gls)
2016–2021	Comunicaciones		(200+)
2021–2022	Zaragoza	29	(7)
2022–2025	Eibar	30	(8)
2025-	Sevilla	8	(2)

International career^{‡}
2020	Guatemala U20	2	(2)
2021–	Guatemala	4	(3)
- * Club domestic league appearances and goals as of 21 October 2023 ‡ National team caps and goals as of 15 June 2021.

Andrea Abigail Álvarez Donis (born 13 January 2003) is a Guatemalan professional footballer who plays as a forward for Spanish Liga F club Sevilla and the Guatemala women's national team.

== Club career ==
Álvarez has played for Comunicaciones FC in Guatemala, where she scored more than 200 league goals. On 26 July 2021, she was signed by Zaragoza CFF in Spain.

== International career ==
Álvarez made her senior debut for Guatemala on 16 February 2021 in a 3–1 friendly home win over Panama.

== See also ==
- List of Guatemala women's international footballers
