= FC Oshawa =

Canadian soccer team

- Full name: FC Oshawa
- Founded: 2019
- Stadium: Terry Kelly Field at Civic Stadium
- Capacity: 2000
- Head Coach: Ron Clarke
- League: League1 Ontario
- 2019: League1 Ontario, 6th
- Website: FC Oshawa website

FC Oshawa was a Canadian women's semi-professional soccer club based in Oshawa, Ontario. The club was founded in 2019 to compete in the League1 Ontario women's division, as a partnership between two local area youth clubs - Oshawa Kicks SC and FC Durham Academy.

== Founder clubs ==
The club was founded in 2019 as a joint partnership between Durham Region clubs Oshawa Kicks Soccer Club and FC Durham Academy.

Founder clubs

=== Oshawa Kicks SC ===
Oshawa Kicks SC is a youth soccer club located in Oshawa, Ontario. It was founded in 1975.

=== FC Durham ===
FC Durham Academy is a youth soccer academy located in Oshawa, Ontario. It was founded in 2013. After FC Oshawa folded, they continued to their own team in the League1 Ontario Reserve division, under the FC Durham name.

== History ==
They had originally planned to join for the 2020 season, however the opportunity arose to join a year earlier and the clubs approved the earlier entry. In addition to the two founder clubs, they also used some players from the third local team in the city, Oshawa Turul. Oshawa Kicks had previously been part of the partnership with L1O club Durham United FA. They are one of three clubs representing Durham in League1 Ontario.

The club's first team entered the League1 Ontario women's division in 2019. They played their first match on May 4 against DeRo United. On July 20, they set a team record with a 10-0 victory over North Mississauga SC. They finished in a three-way tie for fifth place in their debut season (ultimately finishing sixth after tie-breakers) and advanced to the playoffs, where they were eliminated in the first round by eventual champions FC London. Their second season was cancelled due to the COVID-19 pandemic, which resulted in the cancellation of the entire league season. The club did not return in 2021.

== Seasons ==
Women

Season	League	Teams	Record	Rank	Playoffs	League Cup	Ref
2019	League1 Ontario	14	6–2–5	6th	Quarter-finals	–	
2020	Season cancelled due to COVID-19 pandemic						

== Notable former players ==
The following players have either played at the professional or international level, either before or after playing for the League1 Ontario team:

- (Guyana) (Canada) Aneesa O'Brien
- (Guyana) (Canada) Nailah Rowe
- (Guyana) (Canada) Rylee Traicoff
