= Maria-Frances Serrant =

Trinidad and Tobago footballer

Personal information
- Date of birth: 14 November 2002 (age 23)
- Height: 1.73 m (5 ft 8 in)
- Position: Midfielder

Team information
- Current team: Neom
- Number: 8

Youth career
- 201?–2019: Diego Martin Central Secondary School

College career
Years	Team	Apps	(Gls)
2020–2021	Corban Warriors	27	(14)
2022–2023	West Texas A&M Buffaloes	22	(17)

Senior career*
Years	Team	Apps	(Gls)
2024–2025	BIIK Shymkent		
2025–	Neom		

International career^{‡}
2016	Trinidad and Tobago U15	5	(0)
2018	Trinidad and Tobago U-18 (futsal)	4	(1)
2020–2022	Trinidad and Tobago U20	8	(4)
2019–	Trinidad and Tobago	14	(2)
- * Club domestic league appearances and goals ‡ National team caps and goals as of 28 October 2025

Maria-Frances Serrant (born 14 November 2002) is a Trinidadian footballer who plays as a midfielder for Saudi Women's Premier League club Neom and the Trinidad and Tobago women's national team.

== Early life ==
Serrant was raised in Port of Spain.

== High school and college career ==
Serrant has attended the Diego Martin Central Secondary School in Diego Martin, Trinidad. Since 2020, she attends the Corban University in Salem, Oregon, United States.

== International career ==
Serrant represented Trinidad and Tobago at the 2016 CONCACAF Girls' U-15 Championship. She represented the U17 team and captained the U18 Futsal team. She played at the 2020 and 2022 CONCACAF Women's U-20 Championship. At senior level, she played the 2019 CONCACAF Women's Olympic Qualifying Championship. In 2022, She participated in the World Cup Qualifiers. In 2023, She also participated in the Gold Cup Qualifiers.

=== International goals ===
Scores and results list Trinidad and Tobago goal tally first

No.	Date	Venue	Opponent	Score	Result	Competition	Ref.
1	20 February 2022	National Track and Field Leonora, Leonora, Guyana	Dominica	2–0	2–0	2022 CONCACAF W Championship qualification	
2	9 April 2022	TCIFA National Academy, Providenciales,Turks and Caicos	Turks and Caicos Islands	11–0	13–0	2022 CONCACAF W Championship qualification	
