= Gabriela Juárez =

Mexican footballer (born 2000)

Personal information
- Full name: Venicia Gabriela Juárez Smith
- Date of birth: 13 April 2000 (age 26)
- Place of birth: Washington, United States
- Height: 1.72 m (5 ft 8 in)
- Position: Striker

College career
Years	Team	Apps	(Gls)
2018–2021	Princeton Tigers	43	(25)

Senior career*
Years	Team	Apps	(Gls)
2022–2023	UNAM	26	(15)
2023–2024	Mazatlán	19	(1)
2024–2025	Puebla	19	(2)

International career^{‡}
2015–2016	Mexico U-17	9	(4)
2017–2020	Mexico U-20	8	(5)
- * Club domestic league appearances and goals as of 29 February 2024 ‡ National team caps and goals as of 29 February 2024

Venicia Gabriela Juárez Smith (born 13 April 2000) is a professional footballer who played as a Striker for Liga MX Femenil side Puebla. Born and raised in the United States, she represents Mexico internationally.

== Career ==
In 2022, she started her career in UNAM. In 2023, she was transferred to Mazatlán. In 2024, she joined Puebla.

== International career ==
Juárez represented Mexico at the 2016 CONCACAF Women's U-17 Championship and at the 2016 FIFA U-17 Women's World Cup. and also represented Mexico at one FIFA U-20 Women's World Cup edition (2018).
