= Guyana women's national under-20 football team =

Association women's youth football team from Guyana

Guyana Women's U-20
- Nickname: Lady Jags
- Association: Guyana Football Federation
- Confederation: CONCACAF (North America)
- Head coach: (Guyana) Paul DeAbreu
- Captain: Samantha Banfield
- Home stadium: Providence Stadium
- FIFA code: GUY
First colours	Second colours

First international
- Guyana 1–7 Suriname (Saint Paul, Antigua and Barbuda; 17 January 2002)

Biggest win
- Dominica 0–10 Guyana (Santo Domingo, Dominican Republic; 17 April 2023)

Biggest defeat
- Guyana 0–9 Costa Rica (Alajuela, Costa Rica; 1 June 2025)

FIFA U-20 Women's World Cup
- Appearances: 0

CONCACAF Women's U-20 Championship
- Appearances: 3 (first in 2020)
- Best result: Quarter-finals (2020)

The Guyana women's national under-20 football team is the association football women's team that represents the Guyana at the under-20 level. The team competes in the CONCACAF Women's U-20 Championship and FIFA U-20 Women's World Cup.

== History ==
The Guyana national women's under-20 teams represents the country women's under-20 teams in the various competitions. The team have played their debut game against Suriname on 17 January 2002 at Saint Paul, Antigua and Barbuda which lost by 1–7 goals. Most recently in the 2020 they have reached into Quarter-final of 2020 CONCACAF Women's U-20 Championship which ever team history best performance. In the 2022 in their regional tournament CONCACAF Women's U-20 Championship they have exit from Round of 16. The team have not yet qualified to the FIFA U-20 Women's World Cup.

== Current squad ==
The following squad was named recently finished 2022 CONCACAF Women's U-20 Championship.

No.	Pos.	Player	Date of birth (age)	Club
1	GK	Arden La-Rose	28 August 2003 (aged 18)	(Canadian Soccer Association) North Toronto Nitros
18	GK	Aneesa O'Brien	27 April 2002 (aged 19)	(Canadian Soccer Association) FC Durham
2	DF	Jessica Myers	4 September 2002 (aged 19)	(Canadian Soccer Association) FC Durham
3	DF	Hasha Holder	12 November 2003 (aged 18)	(Guyana Football Federation) Fruta Conquerors FC
4	DF	Savannah Mordesir-Singh	6 January 2003 (aged 19)	(Canadian Soccer Association) Burlington Bayhawks
10	DF	Kiana Khedoo	16 December 2002 (aged 19)	(Canadian Soccer Association) Pickering FC
12	DF	Allianna Holder	7 November 2004 (aged 17)	(Guyana Football Federation) Fruta Conquerors FC
14	DF	Rory Scott	26 February 2003 (aged 18)	(Canadian Soccer Association) North Mississauga SC
17	DF	Gabriella Salvadore	11 May 2002 (aged 19)	(Canadian Soccer Association) ProStars FC
7	MF	Samantha Banfield (Captain)	17 February 2004 (aged 18)	(Canadian Soccer Association) Woodbridge Strikers B
8	MF	Jenea Knight	25 May 2003 (aged 18)	(Canadian Soccer Association) Ottawa South United
13	MF	Jessica Jagdeo	10 July 2002 (aged 19)	(Canadian Soccer Association) Durham College
15	MF	Dylana Makarowski	26 May 2002 (aged 19)	(Canadian Soccer Association) York University
19	MF	Latesha Sutherland	31 May 2003 (aged 18)	(Guyana Football Federation) Fruta Conquerors FC
20	MF	Valentina Khan	28 July 2002 (aged 19)	(Canadian Soccer Association) Unionville Milliken SC
5	FW	Shamya Daniels	8 August 2004 (aged 17)	(Guyana Football Federation) Fruta Conquerors FC
6	FW	Audrey Narine	24 May 2002 (aged 19)	(Canadian Soccer Association) North Mississauga SC
9	FW	Shanic Thornhill	26 November 2003 (aged 18)	(Guyana Football Federation) Fruta Conquerors FC
11	FW	Alleia Alleyne	28 June 2003 (aged 18)	(Trinidad and Tobago Football Association) Police FC
16	FW	Inari Moore	31 January 2003 (aged 19)	(Canadian Soccer Association) Dalhousie University

== Fixtures and results ==
Legend

Win Draw Loss Fixture

== Competitive records ==
=== FIFA U-20 Women's World Cup ===
FIFA U-20 Women's World Cup record
Year	Round	Position	MP	W	D*	L	GF	GA
(Canada) 2002 to (Colombia) 2024	Did not qualify							
(Poland) 2026	To be determined							
Total	–	0/12	0	0	0	0	0	0

=== CONCACAF Women's U-20 Championship ===
CONCACAF Women's U-20 Championship record
Year	Result	MP	W	D	L	GF	GA
(Trinidad and Tobago) 2002 to (Trinidad and Tobago) 2018	Did not qualify						
(Dominican Republic) 2020	Quarter-finals	5	3	0	2	7	8
(Dominican Republic) 2022	Round of 16	4	1	0	3	3	12
Total	2/11	9	4	0	5	10	20
