= 2016 League1 Ontario season =

League1 Ontario Men's Division
- Season: 2016
- Champions: Vaughan Azzurri
- Cup champions: Vaughan Azzurri
- Matches: 175
- Goals: 733 (4.19 per match)
- Top goalscorer: Elvir Gigolaj (24 goals)
- Best goalkeeper: Joseph Kuta (0.67 GAA)
- Biggest home win: TFC Academy 9–0 Master's (July 10, 2016)
- Biggest away win: Master's 2–8 Windsor (July 16, 2016); Master's 2–8 N. Miss. (August 6, 2016); ProStars 2–8 TFC Academy (August 26, 2016); Kingston 0–6 Vaughan (September 25, 2016)

The 2016 Men's League1 Ontario season was the third season of play for League1 Ontario, a Division 3 semi-professional soccer league in the Canadian soccer pyramid and the highest level of soccer based in the Canadian province of Ontario.

This season saw the return of all but one of the teams which completed the previous season, as well as the addition of five new teams for the men's division.

== Changes from 2015 ==
Five new teams joined the men's division for this season. Aurora United FC, North Mississauga SC, North Toronto Nitros, Toronto Skillz FC added new entries, while FC London moved over from the Premier Development League. One team (ANB Futbol) from 2015 did not renew their license, resulting in a 16-team competition and a change from a single-table format to a two-conference format.

The league's cup tournament for the men's division will be a single-elimination competition; eliminating the group stage seen in previous editions.

On June 16, 2016, Toronto FC entered into a partnership with the Windsor Stars wherein the latter would become a "regional satellite club" of the former, who would in turn provide technical and coaching development. As part of the agreement, Windsor would become known as "Windsor TFC" in the future. The agreement does not affect the participation in L1O of either the Windsor Stars or the TFC Academy team.

== Teams ==
| Team | City | Stadium | Founded | First season | Head coach |
Western Conference
| FC London | London, Ontario | German Canadian FC Stadium | 2008 | 2016 | (Croatia) Mario Despotović |
| North Mississauga SC | Mississauga, Ontario | Hershey Centre, Field 2 | 1982 | 2016 | (Trinidad and Tobago) Rick Titus |
| Oakville Blue Devils | Oakville, Ontario | Sheridan Stadium | 1994 | 2015 | (England) Duncan Wilde |
| ProStars FC | Brampton, Ontario | Victoria Park Stadium | 2015 | 2015 | (Hungary) Josef Komlodi |
| Sanjaxx Lions | Toronto, Ontario | Monarch Park Stadium | 2012 | 2015 | (England) Peter Mellon |
| Sigma FC | Mississauga, Ontario | Hershey Centre, Field 1 | 2005 | 2014 | (Canada) Bobby Smyrniotis |
| Toronto FC Academy | Toronto, Ontario | KIA Training Ground | 2008 | 2014 | (Scotland) Stuart Neely |
| Windsor Stars | Windsor, Ontario | McHugh Stadium | 2004 | 2014 | (Canada) Shane Topalovic |
Eastern Conference
| Aurora United FC | Aurora, Ontario | Sheppard's Bush | 1964 | 2016 | (Canada) Jim Brennan |
| Durham United FA | Pickering, Ontario | Kinsmen Park | 2014 | 2014 | (Canada) Sanford Carabin |
| Kingston Clippers | Kingston, Ontario | Tindall Field, Queen's University | 1971 | 2014 | (Canada) Christian Hoefler |
| Master's Futbol | Toronto, Ontario | L'Amoreaux Park | 2012 | 2014 | Andre Savelev |
| North Toronto Nitros | Toronto, Ontario | Varsity Stadium | 1980 | 2016 | (Cameroon) Hermann Kingué |
| Toronto Skillz FC | Toronto, Ontario | Birchmount Stadium | 2008 | 2016 | (Trinidad and Tobago) Leslie Fitzpatrick |
| Vaughan Azzurri | Vaughan, Ontario | McNaughton Park | 2014 | 2014 | (Canada) Carmine Isacco |
| Woodbridge Strikers | Woodbridge, Ontario | Vaughan Grove | 1976 | 2014 | (Canada) Peter Pinizzotto |

Location of teams outside of Toronto for the 2016 League1 Ontario season.
Western Conference Eastern Conference
Location of teams in or near Toronto for the 2016 League1 Ontario season.
Western Conference Eastern Conference

== Standings ==
Each team played 22 matches as part of the season; two against every team in their own conference, and one against every team in the opposing conference. The top team from each conference met at the end of the season to determine the league champion and face the PLSQ league champion in the Inter-Provincial Cup.

=== Eastern Conference ===
| Pos | Team | Pld | W | D | L | GF | GA | GD | Pts | Qualification |
|---|---|---|---|---|---|---|---|---|---|---|
| 1 | Vaughan Azzurri (C, X) | 22 | 17 | 4 | 1 | 70 | 24 | +46 | 55 | League Championship |
| 2 | Woodbridge Strikers | 22 | 15 | 2 | 5 | 52 | 17 | +35 | 47 | |
| 3 | North Toronto Nitros | 22 | 14 | 3 | 5 | 52 | 29 | +23 | 45 | |
| 4 | Durham United FA | 22 | 11 | 3 | 8 | 54 | 42 | +12 | 36 | |
| 5 | Kingston Clippers | 22 | 7 | 5 | 10 | 34 | 53 | −19 | 26 | |
| 6 | Aurora United FC | 22 | 4 | 3 | 15 | 27 | 66 | −39 | 15 | |
| 7 | Toronto Skillz FC | 22 | 3 | 4 | 15 | 32 | 63 | −31 | 13 | |
| 8 | Master's Futbol | 22 | 3 | 2 | 17 | 38 | 92 | −54 | 11 | |

Source: http://www.league1ontario.com/page/show/2309115-standings
(C) Champions; (X) L1 Cup winner

=== Western Conference ===
| Pos | Team | Pld | W | D | L | GF | GA | GD | Pts | Qualification |
|---|---|---|---|---|---|---|---|---|---|---|
| 1 | FC London | 22 | 15 | 2 | 5 | 64 | 32 | +32 | 47 | League Championship |
| 2 | Sigma FC | 22 | 14 | 2 | 6 | 48 | 28 | +20 | 44 | |
| 3 | Toronto FC Academy | 22 | 12 | 2 | 8 | 70 | 37 | +33 | 38 | |
| 4 | North Mississauga SC | 22 | 11 | 5 | 6 | 63 | 42 | +21 | 38 | |
| 5 | Windsor Stars | 21 | 9 | 1 | 11 | 44 | 42 | +2 | 28 | |
| 6 | Oakville Blue Devils | 22 | 8 | 4 | 10 | 38 | 43 | −5 | 28 | |
| 7 | Sanjaxx Lions | 21 | 5 | 1 | 15 | 23 | 56 | −33 | 16 | |
| 8 | ProStars FC | 22 | 4 | 3 | 15 | 24 | 67 | −43 | 15 | |

Source: http://www.league1ontario.com/page/show/2309115-standings

=== League Championship ===
The league champion is determined by a single-match series between the top-ranked teams from the western and eastern conferences.

| October 15 | FC London | 2–4 | Vaughan Azzurri | Vaughan, Ontario |
| 4:00 pm | Nafar 71'; Gigolaj 80' | Report | Butters 9'; Gogarty 12'; Kovacevic 52'; Whiteman 68' | Stadium: Ontario Soccer Centre; Attendance: 700 |

== L1 Cup ==
The cup tournament is a separate contest from the rest of the season, in which all sixteen teams from the men's division take part. It is not a form of playoffs at the end of the season (as is typically seen in North American sports), but is more like the Canadian Championship or the FA Cup, albeit only for League1 Ontario teams. All matches are separate from the regular season, and are not reflected in the season standings.

The cup tournament for the men's division is a single-match knockout tournament with four total rounds culminating in a final match at the end of July, with initial matchups determined by random draw. Each match in the tournament must return a result; any match drawn after 90 minutes will advance directly to kicks from the penalty mark instead of extra time.

Round of 16
Sigma FC | 1 (2)
Master's Futbol (p) | 1 (3)
Windsor Stars | 1
Toronto Skillz FC | 2
Oakville Blue Devils | 1 (4)
Vaughan Azzurri (p) | 1 (5)
Sanjaxx Lions | 1 (1)
Aurora United FC (p) | 1 (4)
FC London | 0
Durham United FA | 3
North Mississauga SC | 1
North Toronto Nitros | 2
ProStars FC | 3
Woodbridge Strikers | 4
Toronto FC Academy | 1
Kingston Clippers | 3

Quarterfinals
Master's Futbol | 3
Toronto Skillz FC | 1
Vaughan Azzurri | 3
Aurora United FC | 2
Durham United FA | 1
North Toronto Nitros | 3
Woodbridge Strikers | 2
Kingston Clippers | 0

Semifinals
Master's Futbol | 0
Vaughan Azzurri | 3
North Toronto Nitros | 0
Woodbridge Strikers | 1

Final
Vaughan Azzurri | 1
Woodbridge Strikers | 0

=== Round of 16 ===
| June 1 | Sigma FC | 1–1 (2–3 p) | Master's Futbol | Mississauga, Ontario |
| 9:00 pm | Zajac 63' (pen.) | Report | Page 34' | Stadium: Hershey Centre, Field 1 |

| June 1 | Windsor Stars | 1–2 | Toronto Skillz FC | Vaughan, Ontario |
| 8:00 pm | Milidrag 43' | Report | Su 48'; Fathazda 61' | Stadium: Ontario Soccer Centre |

| May 18 | Oakville Blue Devils | 1–1 (4–5 p) | Vaughan Azzurri | Oakville, Ontario |
| 8:00 pm | James 28' | Report; Report | Whiteman 23' | Stadium: Bronte Athletic Park |

| May 17 | Aurora United FC | 1–1 (4–1 p) | Sanjaxx Lions | Aurora, Ontario |
| 9:00 pm | Jacovou 90' | Report; Report | Daniel 72' | Stadium: Sheppard's Bush |
| | Penalties |
| | Adjei (penalty scored); Mahrady (penalty scored); Powell (penalty scored); Parolini (penalty scored) | | Daniel (penalty missed); Zullimullah (penalty missed); Serrao (penalty scored) |

| May 26 | FC London | 0–3 | Durham United FA | London, Ontario |
| 8:00 pm | | Report | Cullen 19'; De Jonge 58'; Paredes 71' | Stadium: German Canadian FC Stadium |

| May 31 | North Mississauga SC | 1–2 | North Toronto Nitros | Mississauga, Ontario |
| 8:00 pm | Bryan 85' | Report | Sousa 44', 67' | Stadium: Hershey Centre, Field 2 |

| May 18 | Woodbridge Strikers | 4–3 | ProStars FC | Woodbridge, Ontario |
| 9:00 pm | Zwane 35'; Carreiro 51'; Portillo 63', 90' | Report; Report | Smith 40'; Hathaway 56'; Anderson 89' | Stadium: Vaughan Grove |

| May 26 | Kingston Clippers | 3–1 | Toronto FC Academy | Kingston, Ontario |
| 7:30 pm | Koskins 12'; Pineo 24'; Vanbelleghem 34' | Report | Beckford 76' | Stadium: Tindall Field, Queen's University |

=== Quarterfinals ===
| June 21 | Master's Futbol | 3–1 | Toronto Skillz FC | Toronto, Ontario |
| 6:30 pm | Grant (pen.); Rayne | Report | Wong | Stadium: L'Amoreaux Park |

| June 22 | Aurora United FC | 2–3 | Vaughan Azzurri | Aurora, Ontario |
| 9:00 pm | Jacovou 28'; Adjei 39' | Report | Kovacevic 8', 12'; Di Chiara 68' | Stadium: Sheppard's Bush |

| June 30 | North Toronto Nitros | 3–1 | Durham United FA | Toronto, Ontario |
| 9:00 pm | Elkinson; Laborde; El-Chanti | Report; Report | Parades (pen.) | Stadium: Downsview Turf 2 |

| June 23 | Kingston Clippers | 0–2 | Woodbridge Strikers | Kingston, Ontario |
| 8:00 pm | | Report | Muccilli 23'; Isaac 48' (pen.) | Stadium: Tindall Field, Queen's University |

=== Semifinals ===
| July 13 | Master's Futbol | 0–3 | Vaughan Azzurri | Vaughan, Ontario |
| 8:00 pm | | Report | Whiteman 23'; Di Chiara 25'; Lao 62' | Stadium: Ontario Soccer Centre |

| July 12 | Woodbridge Strikers | 1–0 | North Toronto Nitros | Woodbridge, Ontario |
| 9:00 pm | Isaac 90' (pen.) | Report | | Stadium: Vaughan Grove |

=== Final ===
| July 30 | Vaughan Azzurri | 1–0 | Woodbridge Strikers | Vaughan, Ontario |
| 7:00 pm | Miller 30' | Report | | Stadium: Ontario Soccer Centre |

== Inter-Provincial Cup Championship ==
The Inter-Provincial Cup Championship was a two-legged home-and-away series between the league champions of League1 Ontario and the Première ligue de soccer du Québec – the only Division 3 men's semi-professional soccer leagues based fully within Canada.

| November 5, 2016 | CS Mont-Royal Outremont | 1–1 | Vaughan Azzurri | Terrebonne |
| 8:00pm | Rosa 24' | Report | Kovacevic 57' | Stadium: Complexe Sportifs Terrebonne |

| November 12, 2016 | Vaughan Azzurri | 1–2 | CS Mont-Royal Outremont | Pickering, Ontario |
| 8:00pm | Lowe 14' | Report | Ritch-Andy 41'; Oliveri 67' | Stadium: Pickering Soccer Complex |

CS Mont-Royal Outremont won 3–2 on aggregate

== Statistics ==
=== Top scorers ===
| Rank | Player | Club | Goals |
|---|---|---|---|
| 1 | (Canada) Elvir Gigolaj | FC London | 24 |
| 2 | (Sweden) Simon Adjei | Aurora United FC | 19 |
| 3 | (Canada) Leaford Allen | Sigma FC | 17 |
| 4 | (Bermuda) Kilian Elkinson | North Toronto Nitros | 15 |
| 5 | (Canada) Tyrell Rayne | Master's Futbol | 14 |
| 5 | (Canada) Jarek Whiteman | Vaughan Azzurri | 14 |
| 5 | (Canada) Michael Marcoccia | FC London | 14 |
| 8 | (Canada) Filipe Vilela | Oakville Blue Devils | 13 |
| 9 | (Canada) Jumbo Iyowuna | Windsor Stars | 12 |
| 10 | (Canada) Joey Melo | North Mississauga SC | 11 |
| 10 | (Canada) Ethan Beckford | Toronto FC Academy | 11 |
| 10 | (Canada) Mario Kovacevic | Vaughan Azzurri | 11 |

Source: League1 Ontario

=== Top goalkeepers ===
| Rank | Player | Club | Minutes | GAA |
|---|---|---|---|---|
| 1 | (Canada) Joseph Kuta | Sigma FC | 540 | 0.67 |
| 2 | (Canada) Matt George | Woodbridge Strikers | 1775 | 0.86 |
| 3 | (Canada) Brogan Engbers | Toronto FC Academy | 1104 | 0.90 |
| 4 | (Canada) Andrew D'Souza | Vaughan Azzurri | 810 | 1.22 |
| 5 | (Canada) Connor Bullen | North Toronto Nitros | 720 | 1.25 |
| 6 | (Canada) Mark Rogal | North Toronto Nitros | 1170 | 1.46 |
| 7 | (Canada) Ben Cowman | Durham United FA | 1080 | 1.50 |
| 8 | (Canada) Triston Henry | Sigma FC | 1071 | 1.60 |
| 9 | (Canada) Anthony Sokalski | FC London | 1710 | 1.63 |
| 10 | (Canada) Kyle Vizarakis | Windsor Stars | 1620 | 1.83 |

Minimum 540 minutes played. Source: League1 Ontario

== All-Star Game ==
On July 25, the league announced the rosters for the first-ever all-star game, to be played between the eastern and western conferences. Eighteen players for each team were selected by coaches and league officials, and each roster contains at least one player from each team in their respective conference.

| August 3, 2016 | West All-Stars | 4–2 | East All-Stars | Vaughan, Ontario |
| 7:30 pm | Allen 4', 44'; Brown 8'; Ribeiro 74' | Report | Cullen 40'; Martin 70' | Stadium: Ontario Soccer Centre |

Due to the unavailability of some players, the league released updated rosters for both western and eastern teams on August 2.

Western Conference All-Stars
| Pos. | Name | Team |
|---|---|---|
Starters
| GK | Matt Zaikos | Sanjaxx Lions |
| D | Stephen Al-Sayed | FC London |
| D | *Al James | Oakville Blue Devils |
| D | Eric Crawford | Oakville Blue Devils |
| D | Jerome Smith | Sigma FC |
| MF | *Chris Nanco | Sigma FC |
| MF/F | Joey Melo | North Mississauga SC |
| MF | *Kota Sakurai | Toronto FC Academy |
| F | *Elvir Gigolaj | FC London |
| F | Leaford Allen | Sigma FC |
| F | Felipe Vilela | Oakville Blue Devils |
Substitutes
| GK | Anthony Sokalski | FC London |
| D | *Rocco Romeo | Toronto FC Academy |
| D | *Jamar Kelly | Windsor Stars |
| MF | Lee Victor Massunda | North Mississauga SC |
| MF | *Kwame Awuah | Sigma FC |
| MF | *Erick Olazabal | ProStars FC |
| F/MF | *Michael Pio | Windsor Stars |
Replacements
| D | Jerome Smith | Sigma FC |
| D | Shawn Brown | North Mississauga SC |
| MF | Christian Samaniego | Sigma FC |
| MF | Gil Hong | ProStars FC |
| MF | Noah Pio | Windsor Stars |
| MF | Randy Ribeiro | FC London |
| F | Jumbo Iyowuna | Windsor Stars |
| F | Hilliard Serrao | Sanjaxx Lions |

Eastern Conference All-Stars
| Pos. | Name | Team |
|---|---|---|
Starters
| GK | Matt George | Woodbridge Strikers |
| D | Bruce Cullen | Durham United FA |
| D | Niba MacDonald | North Toronto Nitros |
| D | Nyal Higgins | Vaughan Azzurri |
| D | Stephen Almeida | Woodbridge Strikers |
| MF | *Jonathan Lao | Vaughan Azzurri |
| MF | Dylan Carreiro | Woodbridge Strikers |
| MF | Jarek Whiteman | Vaughan Azzurri |
| MF | Stefan Lamanna | Durham United FA |
| F | Kilian Elkinson | North Toronto Nitros |
| F | Simon Adjei | Aurora United FC |
Substitutes
| GK | Mark Rogal | North Toronto Nitros |
| D | Cameron Brooks | Woodbridge Strikers |
| D | Eric Koskins | Kingston Clippers |
| MF | Tyrell Rayne | Master's Futbol |
| MF | Ryan Reid | Toronto Skillz FC |
| F | Kashiff De Jonge | Durham United FA |
| F | Andrew Martin | Kingston Clippers |
Replacements
| MF | Eddie Lay | Durham United FA |

== Awards ==
| Award | Player (club) |
|---|---|
| Goal of the Year | Hilliard Serrao (Sanjaxx Lions) |
| Most Valuable Player | Elvir Gigolaj (FC London) |
| Golden Boot | Elvir Gigolaj (FC London) |
| Coach of the Year | Carmine Isacco (Vaughan Azzurri) |
| Young Player of the Year | Kota Sakurai (Toronto FC Academy) |
| Defender of the Year | Niba MacDonald (North Toronto Nitros) |
| Goalkeeper of the Year | Matt George (Woodbridge Strikers) |

First Team All-Stars

| Goalkeeper | Defenders | Midfielders | Forwards |
|---|---|---|---|
| Matt George (Woodbridge Strikers) | Cameron Brooks (Woodbridge Strikers); Niba MacDonald (North Toronto Nitros); Bruce Cullen (Durham United FA) | Randy Ribeiro (FC London); Kashiff De Jonge (Durham United FA); Joey Melo (North Mississauga SC); Joseph Di Chiara (Vaughan Azzurri) | Leaford Allen (Sigma FC); Elvir Gigolaj (FC London); Jarek Whiteman (Vaughan Azzurri) |

Second Team All-Stars

| Goalkeeper | Defenders | Midfielders | Forwards |
|---|---|---|---|
| Anthony Sokalski (FC London); Matt Zaikos (Sanjaxx Lions) | Tyrell Rayne (Master's Futbol); Jarred Phillips (Vaughan Azzurri); Thanujan Jeyathilaka (Toronto Skills FC); Jerome Smith (Sigma FC); Rocco Romeo (Toronto FC Academy); Kevin Dhillon (North Mississauga SC) | Stephen Almeida (Woodbridge Strikers); Brandon Mills (Vaughan Azzurri); Khody Ellis (Oakville Blue Devils); Mackenzie Roach (Kingston Clippers); Justin Stoddart (Sigma FC); Dylan Carreiro (Woodbridge Strikers); Kota Sakurai (Toronto FC Academy); Celso Carapau (Windsor Stars) | Simon Adjei (Aurora United FC); Kilian Elkinson (North Toronto Nitros); Manny Slewa (ProStars FC); Mario Kovacevic (Vaughan Azzurri) |
