= 2015 League1 Ontario season (women) =

League1 Ontario Women's Division
- Season: 2015
- Champions: Durham United FC
- Cup champions: North Mississauga SC
- Matches: 63
- Goals: 252 (4 per match)
- Top goalscorer: Jessica Lisi (21 goals)
- Biggest home win: Woodbridge 11–0 ANB Futbol (6 September 2015)
- Biggest away win: ANB Futbol 1–10 Vaughan (22 August 2015)

The 2015 League1 Ontario season was the first season of play for the Women's Division of League1 Ontario. Originally announced with six teams, a seventh (Woodbridge Strikers) was added before the start of the season. A league cup consisted of two groups of either three or four teams, with the top two from each group advancing to the knockout round.

== Teams ==
Team	City	Stadium
ANB Futbol	King City	The Country Day School
Durham United FC	Pickering	Kinsmen Park
North Mississauga SC	Mississauga	Hershey Centre
ProStars FC	Brampton	Victoria Park
Sanjaxx Lions	Toronto (North York)	Esther Shiner Stadium
Vaughan Azzurri	Vaughan (Maple)	McNaughton Park
Woodbridge Strikers	Woodbridge	Vaughan Grove

== Standings ==
Each team will play 18 matches as part of the season; three games split home and away against every other team in the division. There are no playoffs; the first-place team will be crowned as league champion at the end of the season.

Pos	Team	Pld	W	D	L	GF	GA	GD	Pts
1	Durham United FC (C)	18	14	2	2	69	8	+61	44
2	Woodbridge Strikers	18	13	2	3	53	22	+31	41
3	Vaughan Azzurri	18	10	5	3	50	21	+29	35
4	North Mississauga SC	18	8	3	7	25	22	+3	27
5	ANB Futbol	18	4	1	13	25	70	−45	13
6	Sanjaxx Lions	18	3	2	13	17	58	−41	11
7	ProStars FC	18	2	3	13	13	51	−38	9

Source: http://www.league1ontario.com/page/standings
(C) Champions

== Cup ==
The cup tournament is a separate contest from the rest of the season, in which all seven teams from the women's division take part. It is not a form of playoffs at the end of the season (as is typically seen in North American sports), but is more like the Canadian Championship or the FA Cup, albeit only for League1 Ontario teams. All matches are separate from the regular season, and are not reflected in the season standings.

The cup tournament for the women's division consists of two phases. The first phase is a group phase, where two groups of either three or four teams play in a single round-robin format. From each group, the top two teams advance to the knockout phase, which consists of a semifinal and a final.

Each match in the group stage must return a result; any match drawn after 90 minutes will advance directly to kicks from the penalty mark, with the winner receiving two points in the standings, while the loser receives one point. Likewise, any knockout round matches which are tied after full time head directly to penalty kicks instead of extra time.

=== Group stage ===
Group A

Pos	Team	Pld	W	PW	PL	L	GF	GA	GD	Pts	Qualification	DUR	WDB	ANB	SAN
1	Durham United FC	3	3	0	0	0	17	3	+14	9	Advance to knockout round	—	3–2	8–1	—
2	Woodbridge Strikers	3	2	0	0	1	12	4	+8	6	Advance to knockout round	—	—	4–1	—
3	ANB Futbol	3	1	0	0	2	5	13	−8	3		—	—	—	3–1
4	Sanjaxx Lions	3	0	0	0	3	1	15	−14	0		0–6	0–6	—	—

Source: http://www.league1ontario.com/page/l1-cup-standings

Group B

Pos	Team	Pld	W	PW	PL	L	GF	GA	GD	Pts	Qualification	VGN	NMS	PRO
1	Vaughan Azzurri	2	1	1	0	0	8	1	+7	5	Advance to knockout round	—	2–1 (p)	—
2	North Mississauga SC	2	1	0	1	0	6	4	+2	4	Advance to knockout round	—	—	5–2
3	Pro Stars FC	2	0	0	0	2	2	11	−9	0		0–6	—	—

Source: http://www.league1ontario.com/page/l1-cup-standings

=== Knockout stage ===
Semifinals
1	Durham United FC	0
4	North Mississauga SC	2
3	Vaughan Azzurri	0 (5)
2	Woodbridge Strikers	0 (4)

Finals
North Mississauga SC	2
Vaughan Azzurri	1

==== Semifinals ====
August 6, 2015	North Mississauga SC	2–0	Durham United FC	Pickering, Ontario
8:00 pm	Celluci 8', 39'	Report		Stadium: Kinsmen Park

August 6, 2015	Woodbridge Strikers	0–0 (4–5 p)	Vaughan Azzurri	Maple, Ontario
7:30 pm		Report		Stadium: McNaughton Park
	Penalties
	Penalty scored Penalty missed		Penalty scored

==== Final ====
August 9, 2015	North Mississauga SC	2–1	Vaughan Azzurri	Vaughan, Ontario
3:00 pm	Yacou 47'; Celluci 56'	Report	Lyon 70'	Stadium: Ontario Soccer Centre

== Top goalscorers ==
Rank	Player	Club	Goals
1	Jessica Lisi	Woodbridge Strikers	21
2	Alexandria Lamontagne	Durham United FC	18
3	Hollie Babut	Durham United FC	13
4	Kelsey Araujo	ANB Futbol	12
5	Oshay Lawes	North Mississauga SC	11
6	Nicole Lyon	Vaughan Azzurri	10
6	Geneva Winterink	Durham United FC	10
8	Colleen Beesley	Vaughan Azzurri	9
9	Chanel Hudson-Marks	Woodbridge Strikers	8
9	Nadya Gill	Vaughan Azzurri	8

Last updated October 22, 2015.

== Awards ==
Award	Player (club)	Ref
Most Valuable Player	Nora Abolins (Durham United)	
Golden Boot	Jessica Lisi (Woodbridge Strikers)	
Coach of the Year	Tony La Ferrerra (Durham United)	
Young Player of the Year	Jessica Lisi (Woodbridge Strikers)	
Defender of the Year	Kayla DeSouza (Durham United)	
Goalkeeper of the Year	Nora Abolins (Durham United)	
Goal of the Year	Taylor Potts (Durham United)	

The following players were named League All-Stars.

First Team All-Stars

Goalkeeper	Defenders	Midfielders	Forwards
Nora Abolins (Durham United)	Briana De Souza (Durham United); Kira Bertrand (North Mississauga); Kayla De Souza (Durham United)	Hollie Babut (Durham United); Cat Rogers (ANB Futbol); April Syme (Woodbridge Strikers); Geneva Winterink (Durham United)	Jessica Lisi (Woodbridge Strikers); Alexandria Lamontagne (Durham United); Oshay Lawes (North Mississauga)

Second Team All-Stars

Goalkeeper	Defenders	Midfielders	Forwards
Sarah Bradbury (Sanjaxx Lions)	Shannon Wood (Vaughan Azzurri); Bria Williams (Vaughan Azzurri); Diana DaRocha (Woodbridge Strikers)	Kelsey Araujo (ANB Futbol); Martina Loncar (ProStars FC); Julia Wong (Sanjaxx Lions); Alyscha Mottershead (Woodbridge Strikers)	Nadya Gill (Vaughan Azzurri); Krista Cellucci (North Mississauga); Nicole Lyon (Vaughan Azzurri)
