= 2015 League1 Ontario season =

League1 Ontario Men's Division
- Season: 2015
- Champions: Oakville Blue Devils
- Cup champions: Woodbridge Strikers
- Matches: 132
- Goals: 503 (3.81 per match)
- Top goalscorer: Adonijah Reid; Filipe Vilela (20 goals)
- Biggest home win: Durham 8–0 ProStars (17 July 2015); Sigma 8–0 Master's (18 July 2015)
- Biggest away win: Sanjaxx 0–7 Vaughan (14 June 2015); ProStars 1–8 Kingston (17 October 2015)

The 2015 Men's League1 Ontario season was the second season of play for League1 Ontario, a Division 3 semi-professional soccer league in the Canadian soccer pyramid and the highest level of soccer based in the Canadian province of Ontario.

This season saw the return of all nine teams which completed the previous season, as well as the addition of three new teams for the Men's Division. The 2015 season also marked the birth of League1 Ontario's Women's Division, which began play with seven teams.

== Changes from 2014 ==
Three new teams (Oakville Blue Devils, ProStars FC, and Sanjaxx Lions) joined the Men's Division for this season, resulting in a twelve-team competition for that side. As a result, the group stage of the Men's cup will change from two five-team groups to four three-team groups.

The Cataraqui Clippers changed their name to the Kingston Clippers starting in this season.

== Teams ==
Location of teams outside of Toronto for the 2015 League1 Ontario season.
Location of teams in or near Toronto for the 2015 League1 Ontario season.

Team	City	Stadium
ANB Futbol	King City, ON	The Country Day School
Durham United FC	Pickering, ON	Kinsmen Park
Kingston Clippers	Kingston, ON	Tindall Field, Queen's University
Master's Futbol Academy	Toronto, ON	L'Amoreaux Park
Oakville Blue Devils	Oakville, ON	Sheridan Stadium
ProStars FC	Brampton, ON	Victoria Park
Sanjaxx Lions	Toronto, ON	Esther Shiner Stadium
Sigma FC	Mississauga, ON	Hershey Centre
Toronto FC Academy	Toronto, ON	KIA Training Ground
Vaughan Azzurri	Maple, ON	McNaughton Park
Windsor Stars	Windsor, ON	McHugh Park
Woodbridge Strikers	Woodbridge, ON	Vaughan Grove

== Standings ==
Each team will play 22 matches as part of the season; one home and one away against every other team in the league. There are no playoffs at the end of the season; the first-place team will be crowned as league champion and will face the PLSQ league champion in the Inter-Provincial Cup.

Pos	Team	Pld	W	D	L	GF	GA	GD	Pts	Qualification
1	Oakville Blue Devils (C)	22	17	2	3	57	18	+39	53	Inter-Provincial Cup
2	Woodbridge Strikers (X)	22	15	2	5	44	16	+28	47	
3	Vaughan Azzurri	22	12	7	3	55	22	+33	43	
4	Sigma FC	22	12	6	4	62	33	+29	42	
5	Toronto FC Academy	22	13	1	8	61	37	+24	40	
6	ANB Futbol	22	12	3	7	50	28	+22	39	
7	Durham United FC	22	11	3	8	44	29	+15	36	
8	Windsor Stars	22	7	6	9	39	43	−4	27	
9	Kingston Clippers	22	4	6	12	33	50	−17	18	
10	ProStars FC	22	4	3	15	24	78	−54	15	
11	Sanjaxx Lions	22	3	0	19	14	66	−52	9	
12	Master's FA	22	1	3	18	20	83	−63	6	

Source: http://www.league1ontario.com/page/standings
(C) Champions; (X) L1 Cup winner

== Cup ==
2015 League1 Ontario Cup Men's Division
- Trophy presented to the champions of the League1 Ontario Cup

Tournament details
- Country: Canada
- Dates: May 20 – August 9, 2015
- Teams: 12

Final positions
- Champions: Woodbridge Strikers
- Runners-up: Sigma FC

Tournament statistics
- Matches played: 19
- Goals scored: 82 (4.32 per match)

The cup tournament is a separate contest from the rest of the season, in which all twelve teams from the men's division take part. It is not a form of playoffs at the end of the season (as is typically seen in North American sports), but is more like the Canadian Championship or the FA Cup, albeit only for League1 Ontario teams. All matches are separate from the regular season, and are not reflected in the season standings.

The cup tournament for the men's division consists of two phases. The first phase is a group phase, where four groups of three teams play in a single round-robin format. From each group, the top two teams advance to the knockout phase, which consists of a quarterfinal, semifinal, and final.

Each match in the group stage must return a result; any match drawn after 90 minutes will advance directly to kicks from the penalty mark, with the winner receiving two points in the standings, while the loser receives one point. Likewise, any knockout round matches which are tied after full time head directly to penalty kicks instead of extra time.

=== Group stage ===
Group A

Pos	Team	Pld	W	PW	PL	L	GF	GA	GD	Pts	Qualification	VGN	KNG	MAS
1	Vaughan Azzurri	2	2	0	0	0	8	1	+7	6	Advance to knockout stage	—	—	4–0
2	Kingston Clippers	2	1	0	0	1	5	7	−2	3	Advance to knockout stage	1–4	—	—
3	Master's FA	2	0	0	0	2	3	8	−5	0		—	3–4	—

Source: League1 Ontario

Group B

Pos	Team	Pld	W	PW	PL	L	GF	GA	GD	Pts	Qualification	SIG	ANB	OAK
1	Sigma FC	2	1	0	0	1	6	4	+2	3	Advance to knockout stage	—	—	1–2
2	ANB Futbol	2	1	0	0	1	4	5	−1	3	Advance to knockout stage	2–5	—	—
3	Oakville Blue Devils	2	1	0	0	1	2	3	−1	3		—	0–2	—

Source: League1 Ontario

Group C

Pos	Team	Pld	W	PW	PL	L	GF	GA	GD	Pts	Qualification	WDB	DUR	SAN
1	Woodbridge Strikers	2	2	0	0	0	5	2	+3	6	Advance to knockout stage	—	2–1	—
2	Durham United FC	2	1	0	0	1	7	2	+5	3	Advance to knockout stage	—	—	6–0
3	Sanjaxx Lions	2	0	0	0	2	1	9	−8	0		1–3	—	—

Source: League1 Ontario

Group D

Pos	Team	Pld	W	PW	PL	L	GF	GA	GD	Pts	Qualification	PRO	WSR	TFC
1	ProStars FC	2	1	1	0	0	7	3	+4	5	Advance to knockout stage	—	2–1 (p)	—
2	Windsor Stars	2	1	0	1	0	6	4	+2	4	Advance to knockout stage	—	—	5–2
3	Toronto FC Academy	2	0	0	0	2	4	10	−6	0		2–5	—	—

Source: League1 Ontario

=== Knockout stage ===
Quarterfinals
Vaughan Azzurri	1
ANB Futbol	3
Sigma FC	6
Kingston Clippers	2
Woodbridge Strikers	2
Windsor Stars	1
ProStars FC	1 (4)
Durham United FC	1 (5)

Semifinals
ANB Futbol	1
Sigma FC	3
Woodbridge Strikers	0 (7)
Durham United FC	0 (6)

Final
Sigma FC	1
Woodbridge Strikers	2

Quarterfinals

July 23, 2015	Vaughan Azzurri	1–3	ANB Futbol	Maple, Ontario
7:00 pm	Arnone 65'	Report	Reid 8'; 67' (o.g.); Mills 87'	Stadium: McNaughton Park

July 22, 2015	Sigma FC	6–2	Kingston Clippers	Mississauga, Ontario
7:00 pm	Lee 14'; Halis 32'; Hanson 61'; Zajac 66'; Mrabure 79'; Nanco 82'	Report	Martin 76'; Piccioli 87'	Stadium: Hershey Centre

July 19, 2015	Woodbridge Strikers	2–1	Windsor Stars	Woodbridge, Ontario
7:00 pm	Zwane 17'; Farquharson 75'	Report	Ademolu 28'	Stadium: Vaughan Grove

July 22, 2015	ProStars FC	1–1 (4–5 p)	Durham United FC	Brampton, Ontario
8:00 pm	Allen 34'	Report	Zupo 8'	Stadium: Victoria Park
	Penalties
	Theobald (penalty missed); Fayehun (penalty missed); Allen (penalty scored); Piccinin (penalty scored); Allen (penalty scored); Mickallef (penalty scored); Mickallef (penalty missed)		(penalty scored) Zupo; (penalty scored) Stowell; (penalty missed) Tarazhi; (penalty missed) Dover; (penalty scored) Moncrieffe; (penalty scored) Young; (penalty scored) Oliveira

Semifinals

August 4, 2015	Sigma FC	3–1	ANB Futbol	Mississauga, Ontario
9:00 pm	Laryea 12'; Nanco 17', 62'	Report	Iannicito 74'	Stadium: Hershey Centre

July 29, 2015	Woodbridge Strikers	0–0 (7–6 p)	Durham United FC	Woodbridge, Ontario
9:00 pm		Report		Stadium: Vaughan Grove
	Penalties
	Penalty scored Penalty missed		Penalty missed Penalty scored

Final

August 9, 2015	Woodbridge Strikers	2–1	Sigma FC	Vaughan, Ontario
6:00 pm	Bygrave 19'; Cavallini 56'	Report	Kalonji 89'	Stadium: Ontario Soccer Centre

== Inter-Provincial Cup Championship ==
The Inter-Provincial Cup Championship was a two-legged home-and-away series between the league champions of League1 Ontario and the Première Ligue de soccer du Québec – the only Division 3 men's semi-professional soccer leagues based fully within Canada.

November 1, 2015	Oakville Blue Devils	3–1	CS Mont-Royal Outremont	Vaughan, Ontario
1:30pm	Wason 3', 36'; Ellis 65'	Report	Dagrou 19'	Stadium: Ontario Soccer Centre

November 14, 2014	CS Mont-Royal Outremont	2–2	Oakville Blue Devils	Terrebonne, Quebec
6:00pm	Sissoko 28'; Ritchie-Andy 36'	Report	Mitchell 55'; Novak 85'	Stadium: Complexes Sportifs Terrebonne

Oakville Blue Devils won 5–3 on aggregate

== Top goalscorers ==
This table includes goals scored in all competitions, including both league and cup matches.

As of October 28, 2015

Rank	Player	Club	Goals
1	(Canada) Adonijah Reid	ANB Futbol	20
1	(Canada) Filipe Vilela	Oakville Blue Devils	20
3	(Canada) Joey Cicchillo	Vaughan Azzurri	16
4	(Canada) Cyrus Rollocks	TFC Academy	14
5	(Canada) Christian Cavalllini	Woodbridge Strikers	12
5	(Canada) Marcel Zajac	Sigma FC	12
7	(Northern Ireland) Ryan McCurdy	Kingston Clippers	11
8	(Canada) Belrum Vartanian	ANB Futbol	10
9	(Canada) Leaford Allen	ProStars FC	9
9	(Canada) Michael Pio	Windsor Stars	9
9	(Canada) Tom Winski	ProStars FC	9

== Awards ==
Award	Player (club)	Ref
Most Valuable Player	Filipe Vilela (Oakville Blue Devils)	
Golden Boot	Filipe Vilela (Oakville Blue Devils); Adonijah Reid (ANB Futbol)	
Coach of the Year	Carmine Isacco (Vaughan Azzurri)	
Young Player of the Year	Adonijah Reid (ANB Futbol)	
Defender of the Year	Dominic Samuel (Sigma FC)	
Goalkeeper of the Year	Matt George (Woodbridge Strikers)	
Goal of the Year	Joel Zelt (Kingston Clippers)	

The following players were named League All-Stars.

First Team All-Stars
Goalkeeper	Defenders	Midfielders	Forwards
Matt George (Woodbridge Strikers)	Darian Bygrave (Woodbridge Strikers); Dominic Samuel (Sigma FC); Joe Zupo (Durham United); Al James (Oakville Blue Devils)	Taylor McNamara (Oakville Blue Devils); Stephen Ademolu (Windsor Stars); Richie Laryea (Sigma FC)	Joey Cicchillo (Vaughan Azzurri); Filipe Vilela (Oakville Blue Devils); Adonijah Reid (ANB Futbol)

Second Team All-Stars
Goalkeeper	Defenders	Midfielders	Forwards
Matt Zaikos (Sanjaxx Lions)	Kamal Miller (Vaughan Azzurri); Nick Muth (Oakville Blue Devils); Eric Crawford (Oakville Blue Devils); Tyrell Rayne (Master's FA); Jamar Kelly (Windsor Stars); Bruce Cullen (Durham United)	Joey Pineo (Kingston Clippers); Christian Cavallini (Woodbridge Strikers); Richie Ennin (Toronto FC Academy); Jason Mills (ANB Futbol); Steven Furlano (Toronto FC Academy); Kwame Awuah (Sigma FC)	Cyrus Rollocks (Toronto FC III); Marcel Zajac (Sigma FC); Leaford Allen (ProStars FC); Mario Kovacevic (Vaughan Azzurri); Eric Koskins (Kingston Clippers)
