= 2014 League1 Ontario season =

League1 Ontario
- Season: 2014
- Champions: Toronto FC Academy
- L1 Cup champions: Vaughan Azzurri
- Matches: 72
- Goals: 278 (3.86 per match)
- Top goalscorer: Molham Babouli (21)

The 2014 League1 Ontario season was the inaugural season of the Division 3 Ontario-based semi-professional soccer league. It began on May 30, featuring 10 teams. The league's first ever goal was scored by Toronto FC Academy player Dylan Sacramento.

== Teams ==
Location of teams outside of Toronto for the 2014 League1 Ontario season.
Location of teams in or near Toronto for the 2014 League1 Ontario season.

Being the first year of the league, all teams are new to the league.

On July 22, 2014, the league terminated the license of Internacional de Toronto. Their record will be expunged.

Team	City	Stadium
ANB Futbol	Richmond Hill, ON	The Soccer Centre
Cataraqui Clippers	Kingston, ON	St. Lawrence College South Main Field
Durham United FC	Pickering, ON	Kinsmen Park
Internacional de Toronto	Toronto, ON	Lamport Stadium
Master's FA	Toronto, ON	L'Amoreaux Park
Sigma FC	Mississauga, ON	Hershey Fields at Hershey Centre
Toronto FC Academy	Toronto, ON	KIA Toronto FC Training Ground and Academy
Windsor Stars	Windsor, ON	McHugh Park
Woodbridge Strikers	Woodbridge, ON	Vaughan Grove Sports Park
Vaughan Azzurri	Vaughan, ON	York Stadium

== Format ==
Unlike most North American sports leagues, there will be no playoffs. The title will be awarded to the team with the most points at the end of the 16-game regular season. League1 Ontario also expressed the desire to organize a final game between their champion, and the winner of the other Division 3 league in Canada, the PLSQ.
There will also be a cup competition for the 10 teams, the final representing the last game of the season. This cup is unrelated to the Canadian Championship, though the Canadian Soccer Association has hinted at the possibility of including more teams in the future.

== Standings ==
10 teams began the season, with clubs to play each other twice, home and away. Mid-season Internacional de Toronto was removed was the league with all results removed from the standings.

Pos	Team	Pld	W	D	L	GF	GA	GD	Pts	Qualification
1	TFC Academy (C)	16	11	5	0	51	19	+32	38	Inter-Provincial Cup
2	Woodbridge Strikers	16	10	3	3	35	17	+18	33	
3	Sigma FC	16	8	5	3	48	19	+29	29	
4	Vaughan Azzurri (X)	16	8	3	5	41	26	+15	27	
5	ANB Futbol	16	6	4	6	24	31	−7	22	
6	Windsor Stars	16	6	2	8	25	25	0	20	
7	Master's FA	16	5	2	9	22	40	−18	17	
8	Durham United	16	2	4	10	19	43	−24	10	
9	Cataraqui Clippers	16	0	4	12	13	58	−45	4	
10	Internacional de Toronto	0	0	0	0	0	0	0	0	Suspended (Note: Internacional de Toronto had its license suspended and its results removed effective July 22, 2014. They had a record of 0–1–6.)

Source: https://web.archive.org/web/20140724025136/http://www.league1ontario.com/page/standings
(C) Champions; (X) L1 Cup winner
Notes:

Removed Matches vs IdT (H/A)
Toronto FC Academy	3–2	5–0
Woodbridge Strikers	–	–
Sigma FC	–	–
Vaughan Azzurri	7–1	–
ANB Futbol	–	–
Windsor Stars	2–2	4–0
Masters FA	–	–
Durham United	2–0	–
Cataraqui Clippers	5–3	–

== Statistics ==
=== Top scorers ===
Rank	Player	Club	Goals
1	(Canada) Molham Babouli	TFC Academy	21
2	(Canada) Andrew Ornoch	Vaughan Azzurri	10
3	(Canada) Emery Welshman	Sigma FC	9
3	(Canada) LeRhone Young	Durham United FC	9
5	(Canada) Jonathan Lao	Vaughan Azzurri	8
6	(Canada) Alex Halis	Sigma FC	7
6	(Canada) Marcos Nunes	TFC Academy	7
8	(Canada) Gino Berardi	Windsor Stars	6
8	(Canada) Michael Pio	Windsor Stars	6
8	(Canada) Dylan Sacramento	TFC Academy	6
8	(Canada) Jordan Stoddart	Sigma FC	6
8	(Canada) Alex Dimitriu	Master's FA	6
8	(Romania) Cristian Drăgoi	Windsor Stars	6
8	(Canada) Luca Uccello	TFC Academy	6
8	(Canada) Belrum Vartanian	ANB Futbol	6

=== Player of the week ===
Week	Player	Club
1	(Canada) Nicholas Chiarot	Woodbridge Strikers
2	(Canada) Marco Rodriguez	TFC Academy
3	(Canada) Molham Babouli	TFC Academy
4	(Canada) Andrew Ornoch	Vaughan Azzurri
5	(Canada) Molham Babouli	TFC Academy
6	(Canada) Anthony Santilli	Windsor Stars
7	(Canada) Emery Welshman	Sigma FC
8	(Canada) LeRhone Young	Durham United FC
9	(Canada) Jonathan Lao	Vaughan Azzurri
10	(Romania) Cristian Drăgoi	Windsor Stars
11	(Canada) Luca Uccello	TFC Academy
12	(Canada) Oscar Cordon	Woodbridge Strikers
13	(Canada) Shane Lopez	Master's FA
14	(Canada) Molham Babouli	TFC Academy

== Cup ==
In addition to the regular season, the 2014 League1 Ontario season also contained a cup tournament, which was run separately (and consisted of different games) from the rest of the regular season. The initial ten teams were divided into two groups of five, with each team facing the other teams in their group once. The top two teams from each group advanced to the knockout stage.

=== Group stage ===
The teams were divided into two groups of 5, with the best 2 teams in each group qualifying for the semifinals. With the removal of Internacional de Toronto, Group A was reduced to four teams.

==== Group A ====
Pos	Team	Pld	W	D	L	GF	GA	GD	Pts	Qualification
1	TFC Academy	3	2	1	0	15	2	+13	7	Knockout stage
2	Durham United	3	2	0	1	7	3	+4	6	Knockout stage
3	Cataraqui Clippers	3	1	0	2	2	17	−15	3	
4	ANB Futbol	3	0	1	2	4	6	−2	1	
5	Internacional de Toronto	0	0	0	0	0	0	0	0	Suspended (Note: Internacional de Toronto had its license suspended and its results removed effective July 22, 2014. In the Cup, they had played one match, a 4–1 loss to Durham United, with the result nullified.)

Source: L1O
Notes:

June 13, 2014	Cataraqui Clippers	2–1	ANB Futbol	Kingston, Ontario
8:45pm	(o.g.); Hong	Report	Mills	Stadium: CaraCo Field

July 9, 2014	ANB Futbol	1–2	Durham United FC	Vaughan, Ontario
9:00pm	Mills	Report	Young	Stadium: Ontario Soccer Centre

July 23, 2014	Durham United FC	0–2	Toronto FC Academy	Oshawa, Ontario
8:00pm		Report	Babouli; Stowell	Stadium: Civic Field

July 30, 2014	ANB Futbol	2–2	Toronto FC Academy	Vaughan, Ontario
9:00pm	Vartanian; Michael	Report	Sacramento	Stadium: Ontario Soccer Centre

August 7, 2014	Durham United FC	5–0	Cataraqui Clippers	Oshawa, Ontario
8:30pm	James; Crichton; Young; Agard; Dumevski	Report		Stadium: Civic Stadium

September 27, 2014	Toronto FC Academy	11–0	Cataraqui Clippers	Toronto, Ontario
1:00pm	Babouli 4', 28', 38', 44'; Nunes 16', 26', 78'; Uccello 40'; Rodriguez 50'; Osorio 59', 65'	Report		Stadium: Kia Training Ground

==== Group B ====
Pos	Team	Pld	W	D	L	GF	GA	GD	Pts	Qualification
1	Vaughan Azzurri (O)	4	3	1	0	13	2	+11	10	Knockout stage
2	Sigma FC	4	2	1	1	6	5	+1	7	Knockout stage
3	Woodbridge Strikers	4	2	0	2	5	6	−1	6	
4	Master's Futbol	4	1	1	2	2	6	−4	4	
5	Windsor Stars	4	0	1	3	1	8	−7	1	

Source: L1O
(O) Play-off winners

June 11, 2014	Master's FA Saints	0–2	Woodbridge Strikers	Vaughan, Ontario
9:00pm		Report	Almeida	Stadium: Ontario Soccer Centre

June 19, 2014	Woodbridge Strikers	0–3	Vaughan Azzurri	Vaughan, Ontario
9:00pm		Report	Fabrizi; Cicchillo	Stadium: Vaughan Grove Park

July 11, 2014	Woodbridge Strikers	2–1	Windsor Stars	Vaughan, Ontario
9:00pm	Holder; Derayeh	Report	Berardi	Stadium: Vaughan Grove Park

July 30, 2014	Windsor Stars	0–0	Master's FA Saints	Windsor, Ontario
8:30pm		Report		Stadium: McHugh Stadium

July 30, 2014	Sigma FC	2–2	Vaughan Azzurri	Mississauga, Ontario
9:00pm	Mrabure; Thomas	Report	Whiteman; Moody	Stadium: Hershey Centre

August 11, 2014	Sigma FC	2–1	Woodbridge Strikers	Mississauga, Ontario
9:00pm	Welshman 90+2'; Pereira 90+4'	Report	Anastasov 61'	Stadium: Hershey Centre

September 3, 2014	Master's FA Saints	2–1	Sigma FC	Vaughan, Ontario
9:00pm	Malcolm 21', 26'	Report	Ferritto 84'	Stadium: Ontario Soccer Centre

September 26, 2014	Windsor Stars	0–1	Sigma FC	Windsor, Ontario
8:30pm		Report	Drăgoi 11'	Stadium: McHugh Stadium

October 4, 2014	Vaughan Azzurri	5–0	Windsor Stars	Maple, Ontario
7:00pm	Gertiesingh 4', 42'; Nogueira 9'; Ornoch 44'; Orlov 57'	Report		Stadium: St. Joan of Arc

October 14, 2014	Vaughan Azzurri	3–0	Master's FA Saints	Maple, Ontario
9:00pm	Izeady 68', 88' (pen.); Arnone 90'	Report		Stadium: McNaughton Field

=== Knockout stage ===
The top two teams from each group entered a single-game elimination tournament to determine the cup champion. The final was held on Sunday, October 19 at BMO Field.

Semifinals
Vaughan Azzurri	4
Durham United FC	1
Toronto FC Academy	1
Sigma FC	4

Finals
Vaughan Azzurri	2
Sigma FC	1

==== Semifinals ====
October 18, 2014	Vaughan Azzurri	4–1	Durham United FC	Maple, Ontario
7:00pm	Badat 16'; Iezady 47', 72', 78'	Report	Hargrave 80'	Stadium: McNaughton Turf

October 18, 2014	Toronto FC Academy	1–4	Sigma FC	Toronto, Ontario
9:00am	Babouli 39'	Report	Grant 4'; Zajac 33'; Welshman 37'; McLean 75'	Stadium: Kia Training Ground

==== Finals ====
October 19, 2014	Vaughan Azzurri	2–1	Sigma FC	Toronto, Ontario
2:30pm	Iezady 61'; Di Chiara 77'	Report	Welshman 7'	Stadium: BMO Field

== Inter-Provincial Cup Championship ==
The Inter-Provincial Cup was announced on October 14, 2014 as a two-legged home-and-away series between the league champions of League1 Ontario and the Première Ligue de soccer du Québec – the only Division 3 men's semi-professional soccer leagues based fully within Canada.

November 1, 2014	CS Longueuil	0–4	Toronto FC Academy	Brossard, Quebec
8:00pm		Report	Sacramento 2', 38'; Kaye 10'; Uccello 48'	Stadium: Bell Sports Complex

November 8, 2014	Toronto FC Academy	0–0	CS Longueuil	Pickering, Ontario
8:00pm		Report		Stadium: Pickering Soccer Complex

Toronto FC Academy won 4–0 on aggregate

== Awards ==
Award	Player (club)	Ref
Most Valuable Player	Molham Babouli (Toronto FC Academy)	
Golden Boot	Molham Babouli (Toronto FC Academy)	
Coach of the Year	Peter Pinizzotto (Woodbridge Strikers)	
Young Star Award	Chris Mannella (Toronto FC Academy)	
Goalkeeper of the Year	Anthony Santilli (Windsor Stars)	

The following players were named the League1 Ontario Top XI.

League1 Ontario Top XI

Goalkeeper	Defenders	Midfielders	Forwards
Anthony Santilli (Windsor Stars)	Jonathan Grant (Sigma FC); Franco LoPresti (Woodbridge Strikers); Mateo Restrepo (Toronto FC Academy)	Chris Mannella (Toronto FC Academy); Jonathan Lao (Vaughan Azzurri); Alex Halis (Sigma FC)	Christian Dragoi (Windsor Stars); Molham Babouli (Toronto FC Academy); Emery Welshman (Sigma FC); Andrew Ornoch (Vaughan Azzurri)

The following players were named the League1 Ontario Next XI.

League1 Ontario Next XI

Goalkeeper	Defenders	Midfielders	Forwards
Matt George (Woodbridge Strikers)	Daniel Fabrizi (Vaughan Azzurri); Marcus Godinho (Toronto FC Academy); Giuliano Frano (Sigma FC)	Oscar Cordon (Woodbridge Strikers); Joseph Di Chiara (Vaughan Azzurri); Manny Morgado (Sigma FC); Luca Uccello (Toronto FC Academy)	Julian Uccello (Woodbridge Strikers); Marcos Nunes (Toronto FC Academy); Jason Mills (ANB Futbol)

The following players were named the League1 Ontario Young Stars.

League1 Ontario Young Stars

Goalkeeper	Defenders	Midfielders	Forwards
Filippo Di Bernardo (Toronto FC Academy)	Kevon Black (Toronto FC Academy); Daniel Gogarty (Vaughan Azzurri); Kamal Miller (Vaughan Azzurri)	Dylan Sacramento (Toronto FC Academy); Stephen Almeida (Woodbridge Strikers); Jashua Mills (ANB Futbol); Christian Samaniego (Sigma FC)	Alex Dimitriu (Master's FA); LeRohne Young (Durham United); Raheem Edwards (ANB Futbol)
Honourable Mentions
Ali Ghazanfari (ANB Futbol)	Tyrell Rayne (Master's FA)	Oladapo Afolayan (Toronto FC Academy); Joseph Roccasalva (Durham United); Anthony Osorio (Toronto FC Academy)	Marcel Zajac (Sigma FC); Darren Gertiesingh (Vaughan Azzurri)
