= Hannah Chown =

Canadian soccer player

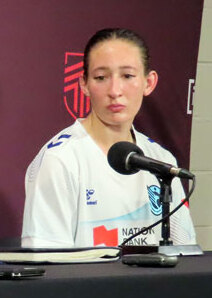
- Chown in 2026

Personal information
- Date of birth: March 19, 2002 (age 24)
- Place of birth: Mississauga, Ontario, Canada
- Height: 5 ft 7 in (1.70 m)
- Position: Defender

Team information
- Current team: Ottawa Rapid FC

Youth career
- Erin Mills Eagles
- Vaughan Azzurri
- North Mississauga SC

College career
Years	Team	Apps	(Gls)
2021–2025	Toronto Varsity Blues	62	(20)

Senior career*
Years	Team	Apps	(Gls)
2017	Vaughan Azzurri	5	(0)
2019	North Mississauga SC	6	(0)
2021	Hamilton United	8	(7)
2022–2025	Alliance United FC	57	(11)
2024–2025	→ Alliance United FC B	2	(0)
2026	Simcoe County Rovers FC	16	(3)
2026–	Ottawa Rapid FC	6	(0)
- * Club domestic league appearances and goals as of October 30, 2026

Hannah Chown (born March 19, 2002) is a Canadian soccer player who plays for Northern Super League club Ottawa Rapid FC.

== Early life ==
Chown played youth soccer with the Erin Mills Eagles and Vaughan Azzurri. She then joined North Mississauga SC for two years, where she was scouted by her future university coach, Angelo Cavalluzzo, in 2019.

== University career ==
In 2020, Chown began attending the University of Toronto and began playing for the women's soccer team in 2021, as the 2020 season was cancelled due to the COVID-19 pandemic. She scored her first goal on October 29, 2021 against the Nipissing Lakers. At the end of her first season, she was named an OUA Central All-Star. In 2022, she was named an OUA East First Team All-Star. In 2023, she was named an OUA East Second Team All-Star. In 2024, she was again named an OUA East First Team All-Star. In the OUA Championship match in 2025, she scored the lone goal in a 1-0 victory over the Guelph Gryphons to win the school's first OUA title in program history. At the end of her fifth and final season in 2025, she earned OUA East MVP, OUA East Community Service Award, and OUA First Team All-Star honours. She was also named a U Sports First-Team All-Canadian, the school's Female Athlete of the Year, and an Academic All-America At-Large team.

== Club career ==
In 2017, Chown played with Vaughan Azzurri in League1 Ontario. In 2019, she played with North Mississauga SC. In 2021, she played with Hamilton United.

In 2022, Chown began playing with Alliance United FC and helped them win the league title in 2023. In 2022, she was named a league third Team All-Star. In 2023, she was named a league Second Team All-Star. In 2025, she was named a league First Team All-Star.

In 2026, she joined the Simcoe County Rovers. She helped the side win the league title in 2026.

In August 2026, she signed with Northern Super League club Ottawa Rapid FC for the remainder of the season. On August 30, she made her debut, playing the full match against AFC Toronto.

== International career ==
Born in Canada, Chown is also eligible to represent Hungary, having previously attended training camps with the latter.

== Career statistics ==
As of October 30, 2026

Appearances and goals by club, season and competition
Club	Season	League			Playoffs		National cup		League cup		Other		Total	
Club	Season	Division	Apps	Goals	Apps	Goals	Apps	Goals	Apps	Goals	Apps	Goals	Apps	Goals
Vaughan Azzurri	2017	League1 Ontario	5	0	—		—		?	?	—		5	0
North Mississauga SC	2019	League1 Ontario	6	0	—		—		—		—		6	0
Hamilton United	2021	League1 Ontario	4	0	—		—		—		—		4	0
Alliance United FC	2022	League1 Ontario	17	0	2	0	—		—		2 (Note: Appearance(s) in Women's Inter-Provincial Championship)	0	21	0
Alliance United FC	2023	League1 Ontario	9	5	0	0	—		—		2	1	11	6
Alliance United FC	2024	League1 Ontario Premier	15	2	—		—		1	0	—		16	2
Alliance United FC	2025	League1 Ontario Premier	16	4	—		—		3	1	—		19	5
Alliance United FC	Total		57	11	2	0	0	0	4	1	4	1	67	13
Alliance United FC B	2024	League2 Ontario	1	0	0	0	—		—		—		1	0
Alliance United FC B	2025	League2 Ontario	1	0	0	0	—		—		—		1	0
Alliance United FC B	Total		2	0	0	0	0	0	0	0	0	0	2	0
Simcoe County Rovers FC	2026	Ontario Premier League 1	16	3	—		1	0	2	0	—		19	3
Ottawa Rapid FC	2026	Northern Super League	6	0	0	0	0	0	—		—		6	0
Career total			96	14	2	0	1	0	6	1	4	1	109	16
