= Elvir Gigolaj =

Bosnian footballer (born 1992)

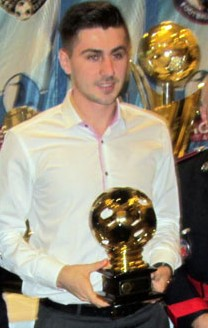
- Gigolaj in 2016

Personal information
- Full name: Elvir Gigolaj
- Date of birth: 30 June 1992 (age 34)
- Place of birth: Croatia
- Height: 1.85 m (6 ft 1 in)
- Position: Forward

College career
Years	Team	Apps	(Gls)
2010–2011	Saint Mary's	26	(11)

Senior career*
Years	Team	Apps	(Gls)
2011	London City		
2012–2013	FC Edmonton	6	(1)
2016–2017	FC London	39	(40)
2021	St. Catharines Hrvat		
2024	Hamilton City		
2025	Waterloo United	13	(3)
- * Club domestic league appearances and goals as of 1 May 2026

Elvir Gigolaj (Albanian: Elvir Gegollaj; born 30 June 1992) is a Bosnian footballer.

== Early life ==
Gigolaj was born in Croatia to a Kosovar Albanian father and Bosniak mother from Brčko, Bosnia and Herzegovina. He was raised in London, Ontario, where his father owns a bakery that carries the family name.

== Club career ==
=== Early career ===
He, at one point, played for London City's soccer side who participated in the Canadian Soccer League and with whom he had a good relationship with his coach, Luka Shaqiri.

Gigolaj attended St. Mary's University for two years from 2010 to 2012, playing for the Huskies in the 2010 and 2011 varsity seasons, scoring 11 goals in 26 appearances.

=== FC Edmonton ===
In January 2012, after training with the team, Gigolaj officially joined FC Edmonton of the North American Soccer League. Gigolaj then made his debut for FC Edmonton in the NASL on 3 June 2012 in which he came on as an 85th-minute substitute for Yashir Pinto as FC Edmonton went on to lose the match 2–1.

He then scored his first professional goal of his career on 23 September 2012 against the Fort Lauderdale Strikers in which he found the net in the 90th minute to start a late comeback for Edmonton as they went from 2–0 down to finishing the match drawing 2–2.

On 30 June 2013, it was announced that Gigolaj was released by FC Edmonton.

=== Germany ===
After being released by FC Edmonton, Gigolaj attempted to join the reserve team of German Bundesliga side, Hertha BSC but he had hit paperwork problems.

=== FC London ===
Gigolaj spent the 2016 and 2017 seasons with League1 Ontario club FC London.

=== CSL ===
In 2021, he returned to the Canadian Soccer League to play with St. Catharines Hrvat. Gigolaj signed with league rivals Hamilton City in 2024.

=== Waterloo United ===
In 2025, he returned to League1 Ontario with Waterloo United, reuniting him with his old coach, Michael Marcoccia.

== Honours ==
FC London

- League1 Ontario First Team All Star: 2016
- League1 Ontario Third Team All Star: 2017

== Career statistics ==
As of 1 October 2017

Club	League	Season	League		Playoffs		Cup		Total	
Club	League	Season	Apps	Goals	Apps	Goals	Apps	Goals	Apps	Goals
FC Edmonton	NASL	2012	6	1	0	0	0	0	6	1
FC Edmonton	NASL	2013	0	0	0	0	0	0	0	0
FC Edmonton total			6	1	0	0	0	0	6	1
FC London	League1 Ontario	2016	20	23	1	1	1	1	22	25
FC London	League1 Ontario	2017	19	17	0	0	1	0	20	17
FC London	Total		39	40	1	1	2	0	42	42
Career total			45	40	1	1	2	1	48	42
