= Leah Pais =

Canadian soccer player (born 2001)

Personal information
- Full name: Leah Maryann Pais
- Date of birth: November 8, 2001 (age 25)
- Place of birth: Mississauga, Ontario, Canada
- Height: 5 ft 4 in (1.63 m)
- Positions: Midfielder; forward

Youth career
- Mississauga Falcons SC
- –2015: Brampton Brams United
- 2016–2018: Vaughan Azzurri

College career
Years	Team	Apps	(Gls)
2019	Albany Great Danes	14	(5)
2020–2022	Pittsburgh Panthers	56	(17)
2023	Florida State Seminoles	17	(2)

Senior career*
Years	Team	Apps	(Gls)
2017–2019	Vaughan Azzurri	21	(13)
2022–2023	Vaughan Azzurri	24	(21)
2024	Þróttur	15	(2)
2025	AFC Toronto	0	(0)
- * Club domestic league appearances and goals as of November 20, 2024

Leah Maryann Pais (born November 8, 2001) is a Canadian soccer player.

== Early life ==
Pais began playing youth soccer at age five or six and played with the Ontario provincial team from age 14 to 16. She played youth soccer with Mississauga Falcons SC and Brampton Brams United, before later joining Vaughan Azzurri, winning the 2018 U18 Ontario Cup.

== College career ==
In 2019, Pais began attending the University at Albany, SUNY, where she played for the women's soccer team. She made her collegiate debut on August 22 against the Oklahoma Sooners. She scored her first career goal on September 25 in a 1-1 draw against the Siena Saints. In late October 2019, she was named the America East Conference Rookie of the Week. At the end of the season, she was named the America East Rookie of the Year and was named to the America East All-Rookie Team.

In 2020, she transferred to the University of Pittsburgh to play for the women's soccer team. She made her debut on September 10 in the season opener against the Appalachian State Mountaineers, scoring two goals and adding an assist in a 4-0 victory. After scoring another goal in the next match, she was named the school's Student-Athlete of the Week. In September 2022, she was again earned the school's top performer of the week honour. In 2020 and 2022, she was named to the ACC Academic Honor Roll and was named to the ACC All-Academic Team in 2022.

In 2023, she transferred to Florida State University for her graduate year and played with the women's soccer team. She scored her first goal on September 3 against the South Florida Bulls. She won the 2023 National Title with the team.

== Club career ==
From 2017 to 2019, she played with Vaughan Azzurri in League1 Ontario. In 2019, she was named the league's Young Player of the Season and a First Team All-Star. She returned to the side in 2022 and 2023. In 2022, she was named a Second Team All-Star and in 2023, she was named a First Team All-Star.

In 2024, she signed with Icelandic club Þróttur (Thróttur Reykjavík) in the top tier Besta deild kvenna.

In November 2024, she signed with AFC Toronto of the Northern Super League for the 2025 season. She was the club's second-ever signing. She missed the entire 2025 season due to a knee injury.

== Career statistics ==
As of August 25, 2024

Club	Season	League			Playoffs		Domestic Cup		League Cup		Total	
Club	Season	Division	Apps	Goals	Apps	Goals	Apps	Goals	Apps	Goals	Apps	Goals
Vaughan Azzurri	2017	League1 Ontario	8	4	—		—		?	?	8	4
Vaughan Azzurri	2018	League1 Ontario	3	0	0	0	—		?	?	3	0
Vaughan Azzurri	2019	League1 Ontario	10	9	0	0	—		—		10	9
Vaughan Azzurri	2022	League1 Ontario	10	10	1	0	—		—		11	10
Vaughan Azzurri	2023	League1 Ontario	14	11	0	0	—		—		14	11
Vaughan Azzurri	Total		45	34	1	0	0	0	0	0	47	34
Þróttur	2024	Besta deild kvenna	15	2	—		3	4	2	0	20	6
Career total			60	36	1	0	3	4	2	0	66	40

== Honours ==
Florida State Seminoles

- NCAA Division I women's soccer tournament: 2023

Individual

- L1O Young Player of the Year: 2019
- L1O All-Star:
  - First Team: 2019, 2023
  - Second Team: 2022
