= Briana De Souza =

Canadian-Guyanese footballer (born 1991)

Briana DeSouza
Personal information
- Date of birth: 22 May 1991 (age 35)
- Place of birth: Scarborough, Ontario, Canada
- Position: Defender

Youth career
- Pickering SC

College career
Years	Team	Apps	(Gls)
2009–2013	Carleton Ravens		

Senior career*
Years	Team	Apps	(Gls)
2013	Ottawa Fury		
2015–2019	Durham United FA	48+	(1)
2021	Vaughan Azzurri	2	(0)

International career
2008–	Guyana	16	(0)
- * Club domestic league appearances and goals as of 10 June 2017

Briana DeSouza (born 22 May 1991) is a footballer who plays as a defender. Born in Canada, she co-captains the Guyana national team and competed at the 2016 CONCACAF Women's Olympic Qualifying Championship.

== Career ==
From 2009 to 2013, she attended Carleton University, playing for the women's soccer team, captaining the team in her final year. In 2011, she was named an OUA All-Star. She was named an OUA East All-Star in 2012.

In 2013, she signed with the Ottawa Fury of the USL W-League.

From 2015 through 2019, she played with Durham United FA in League1 Ontario. In 2015, she was named a league First Team All-Star. In 2016, she played 15 matches, making her debut on 8 May against the Kingston Clippers. In 2017, she made another 15 appearances, scoring her first goal on 30 August against the Toronto Azzurri Blizzard, and was a league Second Team All-Star. She made 9 appearances in each of the 2018 and 2019 seasons, once again being named a Second Team All-Star in 2019.

In 2021, she played with Vaughan Azzurri in League1 Ontario, making two regular season appearances and one playoff appearance.

== Personal ==
DeSouza is of Guyanese heritage on her father's side, where her grandfather was born, and Italian heritage on her mother's side. Her sister, Kayla DeSouza also played for the Guyana national team.

== See also ==
- List of Guyana women's international footballers
