= Pickering FC =

Canadian semi-professional soccer club

- Full name: Pickering Football Club
- Founded: 1984 / 2014
- Stadium: Kinsmen Park
- Head Coach: Eric Polo Soldevila (men); Peter Hogg (women)
- League: League1 Ontario Championship
- 2025: L1O-C, 7th (men); L1O-C, 4th (women)
- Website: pickeringfc.ca

Pickering Football Club, commonly known as Pickering FC, is a Canadian semi-professional soccer club based in Pickering, Ontario that plays in League1 Ontario. The club was founded in 1984 as a youth soccer club and added its semi-professional club in League1 Ontario in 2014. The team plays home games at Kinsmen Park.

The club was one of the ten original founding men's teams in League1 Ontario, which was established in 2014, as well as one of eight original founding women's teams of the League1 Ontario women's division which was established in 2015. The semi-professional team was originally known as Durham United FC from 2014 until 2015, and then Durham United FA from 2016 until 2019, when they re-branded as Pickering FC. Also until 2019, their youth OPDL teams were known simply as United FA.

== History ==
Club logo from 2014 to 2015 - Durham United FC

Club logo from 2016 until 2019 - Durham United FA

In 2014, the semi-professional club was established by Pickering Soccer Club to play in the newly formed League1 Ontario as one of the founding members, with a placeholder name of Durham Power FC, referencing their youth competitive teams which went by the name Pickering Power, whose nickname references the Pickering Power Plant in the city. However, in an effort to be inclusive of the larger region beyond Pickering, the club was ultimately named Durham United FC. This inclusivity allowed the club to form working relationships with other local clubs - Oshawa Kicks SC and West Rouge SC - to participate in the club, although Oshawa Kicks later formed their own club in 2019. To recognize this partnership, in 2016, the club changed the FC to FA to be known as Durham United Football Alliance. Durham United played their first home match against Internacional de Toronto at Kinsmen Park in Pickering, Ontario on June 8, 2014, defeating the visitors 2–0.

In 2015, they added a women's club to participate in the inaugural season of the League1 Ontario women's division. The women's team won the inaugural 2015 league championship. After playing in the league's first four seasons, the men's team went on hiatus for the 2018 season (while the women's club remained active in their division), before returning to the league in 2019. In 2018, the women's team once again won the league championship, after winning the league playoffs.

For the 2020 season, the club re-branded as Pickering Football Club, matching the name of the youth club, who changed their name from Pickering Soccer Club.

After opting out of the 2021 seasons, following the COVID-19 pandemic, it was announced that the club would return to both the male and female divisions, under a new ownership group, Evolution Sports & Entertainment, led by led by principal investors Ritchie Jeune and Chris Rivett, who co-own USL League Two side South Bend Lions FC (Jeune also owns English sixth tier side Kettering Town F.C. and Chinese club Shantou Lions). In 2023, the club withdrew from the Premier Division in both the men's and women's divisions in League1 Ontario, after being unable to find a club partner to operate the team, although they continued to field teams in the reserve division for each gender, with the hope of returning to the top division in 2024. Nevertheless, in July 2023, the league chose to terminate their licence held by Evolution Sports & Entertainment, for the top two tiers for 2024 for both the male and female divisions.

However, in January 2024, the youth club (separate from the Evolution Sports & Entertainment group) purchased the licences of Electric City FC, to re-join the league, entering in the new second tier Championship division (after the top tier division split) for the 2024 season. They finished in last place in the division in 2024, initially set to be relegated to the third tier League2 Ontario for 2025, however, they were re-instated in the Championship, following Scrosoppi FC B declining their promotion spot.

In 2026, the women's team won the second tier division, earning promotion to the first tier for 2027.

== Seasons ==
=== Men ===
Season	League	Teams	Record	Rank	Playoffs	League Cup	Ref
2014	League1 Ontario	9	2–4–10	8th	–	Semi-finals	
2015	League1 Ontario	12	11–3–8	7th	–	Semi-finals	
2016	League1 Ontario	16	11–3–8	4th, Eastern (8th overall)	did not qualify	Quarter-finals	
2017	League1 Ontario	16	11–3–8	3rd, Eastern (7th overall)	did not qualify	Semi-finals	
2018	on hiatus						
2019	League1 Ontario	16	2–2–11	14th	did not qualify	–	
2020	Season cancelled due to COVID-19 pandemic						
2021	on hiatus						
2022	League1 Ontario	22	7–2–12	14th	Did not qualify	–	
2023	on hiatus						
2024	League1 Ontario Championship	10	4–3–11	10th (Note: Pickering was initially relegated to League2 Ontario for 2025, however, they were spared relegation when the promoted teams declined their promotion)	–	Round of 32	
2025	League1 Ontario Championship	12	5–11–6	7th	–	Round of 16	

=== Women ===
Season	League	Teams	Record	Rank	Playoffs	League Cup	Ref
2015	League1 Ontario	7	14–2–2	Champions	–	Semi-finals	
2016	League1 Ontario	9	9–3–4	3rd	–	Quarter-finals	
2017	League1 Ontario	11	9–4–7	5th	–	Quarter-finals	
2018	League1 Ontario	13	7–2–3	4th	Champions	Round of 16	
2019	League1 Ontario	14	4–5–4	10th	Did not qualify	–	
2020	Season cancelled due to COVID-19 pandemic						
2021	Did not enter due to COVID-19 pandemic (entered Reserve division)						
2022	League1 Ontario	20	3–3–13	17th	Did not qualify	–	
2023	on hiatus						
2024	League1 Ontario Championship	10	6–6–6	5th	–	Round of 16	
2025	League1 Ontario Championship	9	7–4–5	4th	–	Round of 16	

== Notable former players ==
The following players have either played at the professional or international level, either before or after playing for the League1 Ontario team:

=== Men ===
- (Guyana) Shaquille Agard
- (Guyana) Kashiff de Jonge
- (Canada) Morey Doner
- (Guyana) Jordan Dover
- (Canada) Duwayne Ewart
- (Canada) Stefan Lamanna
- (Canada) (Jamaica) Shawn-Claud Lawson
- (Canada) Terence Linatoc
- (Canada) Taylor Lord
- (Antigua and Barbuda) Tyrell Rayne
- (Barbados) Emile Saimovici
- (Canada) Joe Zupo

=== Women ===
- (Latvia) (Canada) Nora Abolins
- (Guyana) (Saint Lucia) (Canada) Shanice Alfred
- (Guyana) (Canada) Samantha Banfield
- (Guyana) (Canada) Calaigh Copland
- (Guyana) (Canada) Brianne Desa
- (Guyana) (Canada) Briana DeSouza
- (Guyana) (Canada) Kayla DeSouza
- (Canada) Alex Lamontagne
- (Saint Kitts and Nevis) (Canada) Brittney Lawrence
- (Guyana) (Canada) Serena McDonald
- (Afghanistan) Farkhunda Muhtaj
