= Sanjaxx Lions =

Canadian semi-professional soccer club

- Full name: Sanjaxx School of Soccer
- Founded: 2012
- Stadium: Monarch Park Stadium
- Head Coach: Patrick Laza Lowe
- League: League1 Ontario
- 2018: League1 Ontario, 11th Cup: Round of 16
- Website: https://web.archive.org/web/20190306053335/http://www.sanjaxxsoccer.com/

Sanjaxx Lions was a Canadian semi-professional soccer club based in Toronto, Ontario. The club was founded in 2012 as a soccer academy and added its semi-professional club in League1 Ontario in 2015.

The club was one of the ten original founding men's teams in League1 Ontario, which was established in 2014, as well as one of eight original founding women's teams in the women's division, which was established in 2015. Both the men's and women's teams withdrew from the league following the 2017 and 2018 seasons, respectively.

== History ==
In 2012, Sanjaxx was launched as a soccer academy by founder Patrick 'Laza' Lowe, housed by the Leaside Toronto-East Soccer Club.

In 2015, they added a team in the semi-professional League1 Ontario. They played their debut match on May 3, 2015, against the Oakville Blue Devils, losing 5–0. They played home matches at both Esther Shiner Stadium and Monarch Park Stadium in 2015, before moving to the latter full-time beginning in 2016.

They added a women's club in the women's division to participate in the inaugural 2015 women's season. The women's team played for three seasons, departing the league following the 2017 season. The men's team departed a year later.

== Seasons ==
=== Men ===
| Season | League | Teams | Record | Rank | Playoffs | League Cup | Ref |
|---|---|---|---|---|---|---|---|
| 2015 | League1 Ontario | 12 | 3–0–19 | 11th | – | Group stage | |
| 2016 | League1 Ontario | 16 | 5–1–15 | 7th, Western (12th) | Did not qualify | Round of 16 | |
| 2017 | League1 Ontario | 16 | 4–3–15 | 7th, Western (13th) | Did not qualify | Round of 16 | |
| 2018 | League1 Ontario | 17 | 5–3–8 | 11th | Did not qualify | Round of 16 | |

=== Women ===
| Season | League | Teams | Record | Rank | Playoffs | League Cup | Ref |
|---|---|---|---|---|---|---|---|
| 2015 | League1 Ontario | 7 | 3–2–13 | 6th | – | Group Stage | |
| 2016 | League1 Ontario | 9 | 1–0–15 | 9th | – | Quarter-finals | |
| 2017 | League1 Ontario | 11 | 2–2–16 | 10th | – | Quarter-finals | |

== Notable former players ==
The following players have either played at the professional or international level, either before or after playing for the League1 Ontario team:

- (Canada) Jordyn Listro
