= Luca Uccello =

Canadian soccer player (born 1997)

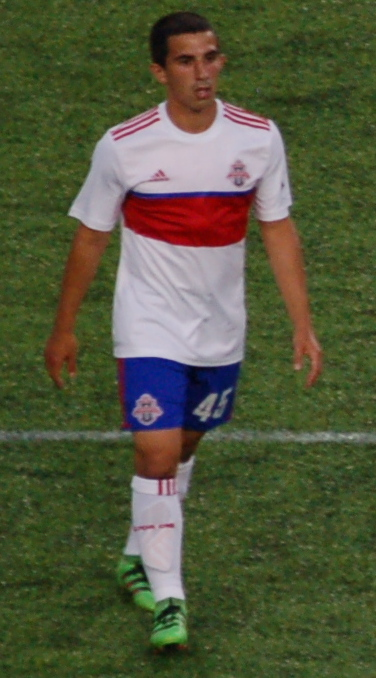
- Uccello playing for Toronto FC II in 2016

Personal information
- Full name: Luca Uccello
- Date of birth: June 17, 1997 (age 29)
- Place of birth: Markham, Ontario, Canada
- Height: 1.72 m (5 ft 8 in)
- Position: Attacking midfielder

Youth career
- 2003–: Thornhill SC
- 2011–2014: Kleinburg Nobleton SC
- 2011–2014: Toronto FC

College career
Years	Team	Apps	(Gls)
2021–2023	Humber Hawks	16	(11)

Senior career*
Years	Team	Apps	(Gls)
2014	TFC Senior Academy	12	(6)
2017	Toronto FC III	1	(2)
2015–2018	Toronto FC II	77	(10)
2019	Memphis 901	6	(0)
2020	Toronto FC II	0	(0)

International career^{‡}
2015	Canada U18	4	(2)
2016–2017	Canada U20	8	(0)
Medal record
U14 National Champion and Golden Boot Winner. U15 GA Cup Golden Boot Winner with TFCA
- * Club domestic league appearances and goals as of October 16, 2019 ‡ National team caps and goals as of February 23, 2017

Luca Uccello (born June 17, 1997) is a Canadian soccer player who currently plays college soccer for Humber College.

== Career ==
=== Club ===
==== Toronto FC II ====
Uccello joined TFC Academy in 2011, and played in the Second Division of the Canadian Soccer League. In 2013, Luca won the Golden Boot at the U15 Generation Adidas Cup with a total of 5 goals as TFC Academy finished runners up against Chivas USA. Uccello would then feature as part of the academy's senior team during the inaugural season of League1 Ontario in 2014. He scored eight goals and won player of the week honours during week 11 of the campaign, as TFC Academy captured the regular season championship.

Uccello signed his first professional contract with Toronto FC's USL affiliate, Toronto FC II on March 12, 2015. He made his debut against the Charleston Battery on March 21. During the 2017 offseason, Uccello would train with Danish club HB Køge, and would later re-sign with the club for the 2018 season.

==== Memphis 901 FC ====
Uccello signed with expansion club Memphis 901 FC for the 2019 season on October 30, 2018.

==== Return to Toronto FC II ====
He returned to Toronto FC II for the 2020 season. However, the club did not play any games that year, opting out of the 2020 USL League One season due to the COVID-19 pandemic. He was released by Toronto FC II after they declined his option for the 2021 season.

=== College ===
In August 2021, the Humber Hawks announced Uccello was joining the team for the 2021 OCAA soccer season. In two seasons with the Hawks, Uccello captured two CCAA national titles, two CCAA All-Canadian selections, and was named CCAA Player of the Year.

In his final season, he was named the 2022-23 OCAA Male Athlete of the Year. Uccello concluded his career tenth all-time at Humber with 53 points (14 goals, 25 assists).

=== International ===
On August 30, 2015 Uccello was called up to the ID U20 camp held In Vaughan, Ontario for 1 week. Uccello was called up to a Canada U-17 camp in February 2013. On April 16, 2015 Uccello was called up by coach Rob Gale to the Canada U-18 side for a tournament in Slovakia. He made his debut for the U18s against Slovakia's U18 squad on April 20, and scored a goal in a 2–2 draw.

In August 2016, he was called up to the U-20 team for a pair of friendlies against Costa Rica Uccello was nominated in back to back years by the Canadian Soccer Association for the Canadian Men's U-20 player of the year Award in 2016 and 2017. In February 2017, Uccello was named to Canada's U-20 World Cup Qualifying roster for the 2017 CONCACAF U-20 Championship.

== Career statistics ==
=== Club ===
As of October 16, 2019

Club	League	Season	League		Playoffs		Domestic Cup		Other		Total	
Club	League	Season	Apps	Goals	Apps	Goals	Apps	Goals	Apps	Goals	Apps	Goals
Toronto FC III	League1 Ontario	2014	12	6	—		—		6	2	18	8
Toronto FC III	League1 Ontario	2017	1	2	—		—		0	0	1	2
Toronto FC III	Total		13	8	0	0	0	0	6	2	19	10
Toronto FC II	USL	2015	22	1	—		—		—		22	1
Toronto FC II	USL	2016	20	3	—		—		—		20	3
Toronto FC II	USL	2017	15	3	—		—		—		15	3
Toronto FC II	USL	2018	18	3	—		—		—		18	3
Toronto FC II	Total		77	10	0	0	0	0	0	0	77	10
Memphis 901 FC	USL Championship	2019	6	0	—		1	0	—		7	0
Career Total			96	18	0	0	1	0	6	2	103	20

== Personal life ==
Uccello was born in Markham, Ontario. He has an older brother, Julian, who is also a soccer player, who most notably played for Crotone in Italy in the Serie B. He also has a twin, Michael, who was also part of the Toronto FC system, playing as a goalkeeper, but at the age 18, Michael decided to leave the club to become a film director.
