= Joe Zupo =

Canadian soccer player and coach

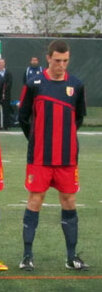
- Zupo in 2015

Personal information
- Full name: Joseph Saverio Zupo
- Date of birth: September 20, 1992 (age 34)
- Place of birth: Scarborough, Ontario, Canada
- Height: 1.88 m (6 ft 2 in)
- Position: Centre-back

Youth career
- 2000–2010: Wexford SC

College career
Years	Team	Apps	(Gls)
2010–2013	Queen's Golden Gaels	63	

Senior career*
Years	Team	Apps	(Gls)
2013–2014	Kingston FC	32	(?)
2015	Durham United FC	22	(2)
2016	Devonport City	21	(2)
2017	Durham United FA	20	(2)
2018	Cairns FC	21	(1)
2018	Hawke's Bay United	7	(1)
2019	Darby FC	14	(2)
2022–2023	Nautsa’mawt FC (Note: Varsity FC changed its name to Nautsa’mawt FC in 2023)	26	(4)
2024–2025	Burnaby FC	11	(1)

Managerial career
- 2022–: UBC Thunderbirds (assistant)
- 2025–: Burnaby FC
- * Club domestic league appearances and goals as of April 12, 2025

Joseph Saverio Zupo (born September 20, 1992) is a Canadian soccer coach and player, who serves as co-head coach with Burnaby FC in the British Columbia Premier League and as an assistant coach with the University of British Columbia men's soccer program.

== Early life ==
Zupo began playing youth soccer with Wexford SC when he was eight years old, winning the Ontario Cup at U17 level. He also played at the high school level with Senator O'Connor College School where he helped their soccer team secure a bronze medal at the high school OFSAA AAA championship in 2009 and was named team MVP.

== University career ==
In 2010, Zupo committed to attend Queen's University to play for men's soccer program. After being an unused sub in the first match of the season, he entered the second match of the season as a substitute following an injury to the starting centre-back 30 minutes into the match, and subsequently played every minute for the team for the next four years. In the final game of his rookie season, on October 24, Zupo scored two goals against the Laurentian Voyageurs, followed by scoring the winning goal in the first round of the playoffs, three days later, also against Laurentian, advancing to the next round. Queen's would ultimately be eliminated in the quarter-finals by the Toronto Varsity Blues, where Zupo contributed the team's lone goal. At the end of the season, he was named an OUA Second Team All-Star.

Ahead of his second season, he was named the team captain. At the end of his second season, Zupo was named an OUA First Team All-Star. At the end of his third season, he was again named an OUA First-Team All-Star. In his final season in 2013, he tied for the team lead in goals with four, and was again named an OUA First Team All-Star.

== Club career ==
=== Canadian Soccer League ===
In the summer of 2013, he signed with the Canadian Soccer League side Kingston FC. He scored his first goal on July 13, in a 2-2 draw against the Windsor Stars. Zupo would help the club secure the first-division regular season title and help them reach the championship final, where they were ultimately defeated by SC Waterloo Region. He was also nominated for the league's Defender of the Year award. After a successful season in the Canadian circuit, he ventured abroad to England for a tryout session with EFL League Two side Exeter City. Following his English trial, he returned to Kingston for the 2014 season, being named the co-captain alongside Cătălin Lichioiu.

=== League1 Ontario, Australia, and New Zealand ===
In 2015, Zupo joined Durham United in League1 Ontario, where he was named a League First Team All-Star at the end of the season.

In 2016, he joined Devonport City FC in the NPL Tasmania, the second tier of football in Australia, helping to lead the team to the league championship and Milan Lakoseljac Cup championship and was named to the NPL Tasmania Team of the Year. He was also awarded Devonport's Best and Fairest recipient that season.

After a year in Australia, Zupo returned to Canada and re-joined Durham United. He was once again named to the league First Team All-Star team at the end of the season.

In February 2018, Zupo returned to Australia, signing with Cairns FC in the NPL Queensland. He suffered an injury in the 2018 FFA Cup Round of 16 match in a 2-1 loss to defending A-League champions Sydney FC, ending his season (his team was winning 1-0 at the time of his injury).

Afterwards, he moved to New Zealand, signing with Hawke's Bay United FC of the ISPS Handa Premiership, the top division of soccer in New Zealand. He scored his first goal in a top division against Waitakere United. His tenure with Hawke's Bay was short-lived as he left the club midway through the season.

He once again returned to Canada in 2019, joining Darby FC in League1 Ontario. He was named to the league First Team All-Star team for the third time. In 2020, League1 Ontario named him to their All-time Best XI.

=== League1 British Columbia ===
In 2020, he went to the Vancouver area to play with local side FC Tigers Vancouver in local divisions.

For the 2022 season, he played in League1 British Columbia with Varsity FC. He remained with the club for the 2023 season, with the club changing its name to Nautsaʼmawt FC.

In 2024, he joined Burnaby FC in League1 British Columbia.

== Coaching career ==
In 2022, he became an assistant coach for the men's soccer team at the University of British Columbia. In December 2024, he was named as a co-head coach alongside Adriano Clemente of Burnaby FC of League1 British Columbia ahead of the 2025 season.

== Personal ==
Zupo has Italian ancestry and is a certified teacher in Canada.

== Career statistics ==
As of April 12, 2025

Club	Season	League			Playoffs (Note: Includes other competitive competitions such as NPL Playoff Finals, CSL Playoffs, and L1BC Playoffs)		Domestic Cup		League Cup		Total	
Club	Season	League	Apps	Goals	Apps	Goals	Apps	Goals	Apps	Goals	Apps	Goals
Kingston FC	2013	Canadian Soccer League	14	?	?	0	—		—		14	?
Kingston FC	2014	Canadian Soccer League	18	?	2	1	—		—		20	1+
Kingston FC	Total		32	?	2	1	0	0	0	0	34	1+
Durham United FC	2015	League1 Ontario	22	2	—		—		4	1	26	3
Devonport City	2016	NPL Tasmania	21	2	4	0	6	0	—		31	2
Durham United FA	2017	League1 Ontario	20	2	—		—		3	0	23	2
Cairns FC	2018	NPL Queensland	21	1	—		2	0	—		23	1
Hawke's Bay United FC	2018–19	New Zealand Football Championship	7	1	0	0	—		—		7	1
Darby FC	2019	League1 Ontario	14	2	—		—		—		14	2
Nautsa’mawt FC	2022	League1 British Columbia	12	2	1	0	—		—		13	2
Nautsa’mawt FC	2023	League1 British Columbia	14	0	—		—		—		14	0
Nautsa’mawt FC	Total		26	2	1	0	0	0	0	0	27	2
Burnaby FC	2024	League1 British Columbia	10	1	—		—		—		11	1
Burnaby FC	2025	League1 British Columbia	1	0	—		—		—		1	0
Burnaby FC	Total		11	1	0	0	0	0	0	0	11	1
Career totals			177	13	7	1	8	0	7	1	200	15

== Honours ==
=== Club ===
Kingston FC

- Canadian Soccer League:
  - Regular Season Champions: 2013

Devonport City

- NPL Tasmania Champions: 2016
- Milan Lakoseljac Cup Champions: 2016

=== Individual ===
- OUA All-Star:
  - First Team: 2011, 2012, 2013
  - Second Team: 2010
- NPL Tasmania Team of the Year: 2016
- League1 Ontario First Team All-Star: 2015, 2017, 2019
- League1 Ontario All-time Best XI: 2020
