= Kingston Clippers =

Canadian semi-professional soccer club

- Full name: Kingston Clippers Soccer Club
- Stadium: Tindall Field, Queen's University
- Head Coach: Christian Hoefler
- League: League2 Ontario
- Website: https://jrgaelssoccer.com/home/?

Kingston Clippers was a Canadian semi-professional soccer club based in Kingston, Ontario. The club was founded as a youth soccer club and added its semi-professional club in League1 Ontario in 2014.

The club was one of the ten original founding men's teams in League1 Ontario, which was established in 2014, as well as one of eight original founding women’s teams of the women's division, which was established in 2015. Both teams withdrew from the league following the 2016 season. The semi-professional team was originally known as Cataraqui Clippers in 2014.

== History ==
Cataraqui Clippers logo

Founded in 1981, the club has operated for over 30 years as a youth soccer club, originally formed under the name Kingston Township Minor Soccer Association. In 1998, they adopted the name Cataraqui Clippers when Kingston Township and Pittsburgh Township amalgamated to form the city of Kingston. In 2015, they again changed their name to Kingston Clippers. In 2018, the club partnered with the city's university, Queen's University whose sports teams are known as the Queen's Golden Gaels, renaming the soccer club as Kingston Junior Gaels Soccer Club. In 2024, the youth club became a development partner club of Atlético Ottawa of the Canadian Premier League, rebranding the club once again to Atlético Kingston.

== Semi-professional team ==
In 2014, the semi-professional club was established to play in the newly formed League1 Ontario as one of the founding members. While it was a semi-professional league, the club announced they would field a completely amateur side and play home games at St. Lawrence College.

After finishing in last place during their inaugural season, the club named Christian Hoefler as new head coach. Hoefler was also the coach of the Queen's University soccer team. Approximately 60% of the Clippers roster would be composed of the university team's players to meet the league's age requirement rules. In addition, the local professional team, Kingston FC of the Canadian Soccer League folded after 2014, with some of the players joining the Clippers. The club also moved their home field to Queen's University's Tindall Field. The club finished their second season with a 4–6–12 record, finishing 9th out of 12 teams.

They added a women's club to participate in the inaugural women's division season. The club left both the men's and women's division in the league following the 2016 season.

In September 2025, they became a youth partner club of the Kingston Sentinels, who were formed as an expansion franchise for League1 Ontario.

== Seasons ==
Men

| Season | League | Teams | Record | Rank | Playoffs | League Cup | Ref |
|---|---|---|---|---|---|---|---|
| 2014 | League1 Ontario | 9 | 0–4–12 | 9th | – | Group Stage | |
| 2015 | League1 Ontario | 12 | 4–6–12 | 9th | – | Quarter-finals | |
| 2016 | League1 Ontario | 16 | 7–5–1 | 5th, Eastern (11th) | Did not qualify | Quarter-finals | |

Women

| Season | League | Teams | Record | Rank | Playoffs | League Cup | Ref |
|---|---|---|---|---|---|---|---|
| 2016 | League1 Ontario | 9 | 5–2–9 | 7th | – | Quarter-finals | |

== Notable former players ==
The following players have either played at the professional or international level, either before or after playing for the League1 Ontario team:

- (Canada) Ndzemdzela Langwa
- (England) Jason Massie
- (Northern Ireland) Ryan McCurdy
