= 2023 League1 Ontario season (women) =

League1 Ontario Women's Division
- Season: 2023
- Dates: April 21 – July 28 (regular season)
- Champions: Alliance United FC
- Regular season champions: NDC Ontario

The 2023 League1 Ontario season is the eighth season of play for Women's Division of League1 Ontario, a Division 3 women's soccer league in the Canadian soccer league system and the highest level of soccer based in the Canadian province of Ontario.

== Format ==
The league will run in a single table format with 19 clubs each playing each other once, with teams playing reverse fixtures from the 2022 season (if a team faced an opponent at home in 2022, they will face them on the road in 2023). With the league set to split into a multi-division format with promotion-relegation beginning in 2024, the points obtained in this season will contribute to the original placement of clubs in 2024, with the points from the 2022 season (weighted at 75%) being added to the points teams obtain in the 2023 season (weighted at 100%) to determine the placements.

The top-six teams in the regular season will qualify for the playoffs with the top-two teams receiving first round byes.

== Clubs ==
With the exception of Pickering FC, 19 of the 20 clubs that took part in the 2022 season will participate in 2023. Because of the format changes planned for the following year, the league imposed a one-year moratorium on any new teams joining the league.

Women's division
Team	City	Principal stadium
Alliance United FC	Markham / Scarborough	Birchmount Stadium / Varsity Stadium / Ontario Soccer Centre
Blue Devils FC	Oakville	Sheridan Trafalgar Stadium
Burlington SC	Burlington	Corpus Christi CSS
BVB IA Waterloo	Waterloo	RIM Park
Darby FC	Whitby	South Courtice Field
Electric City FC	Peterborough	Fleming College
Guelph Union	Guelph	Centennial Bowl
Hamilton United	Hamilton	Ron Joyce Stadium (McMaster University)
FC London	London	Tricar Field
NDC Ontario	Vaughan	Ontario Soccer Centre
North Mississauga SC	Mississauga	Churchill Meadows (Mattamy Sports Park)
North Toronto Nitros	Toronto	Downsview Park
ProStars FC	Brampton	Ontario Soccer Centre / Victoria Park Stadium / Terry Fox Stadium
Simcoe County Rovers FC	Barrie	J.C Massie Field, Georgian College
St. Catharines Roma Wolves	St. Catharines	Roma Park – Under Armour Field
Tecumseh SC	Tecumseh	Académie Ste. Cécile International School
Unionville Milliken SC	Unionville (Markham)	Ontario Soccer Centre
Vaughan Azzurri	Vaughan	North Maple Regional Park
Woodbridge Strikers	Woodbridge (Vaughan)	Vaughan Grove

== Premier Division ==
Pos	Team	Pld	W	D	L	GF	GA	GD	Pts	Qualification
1	NDC Ontario	18	14	3	1	44	7	+37	45	Playoff semifinals
2	Vaughan Azzurri	18	14	2	2	49	14	+35	44	Playoff semifinals
3	North Toronto Nitros	18	12	2	4	47	14	+33	38	Playoff quarterfinals
4	Alliance United FC (C)	18	10	5	3	34	13	+21	35	Playoff quarterfinals
5	Woodbridge Strikers	18	10	4	4	43	22	+21	34	Playoff quarterfinals
6	FC London	18	9	5	4	34	21	+13	32	Playoff quarterfinals
7	Simcoe County Rovers FC	18	8	4	6	32	21	+11	28	
8	Electric City FC	18	8	3	7	29	19	+10	27	
9	North Mississauga SC	18	7	6	5	26	24	+2	27	
10	BVB IA Waterloo	18	7	3	8	34	29	+5	24	
11	Blue Devils FC	18	7	3	8	23	29	−6	24	
12	Guelph Union	18	7	3	8	25	33	−8	24	
13	Unionville Milliken SC	18	7	0	11	27	35	−8	21	
14	St. Catharines Roma Wolves	18	6	3	9	28	33	−5	21	
15	Hamilton United	18	5	3	10	23	42	−19	18	
16	Darby FC	18	4	4	10	16	40	−24	16	
17	Tecumseh SC	18	4	2	12	22	43	−21	14	
18	Burlington SC	18	3	2	13	14	45	−31	11	
19	ProStars FC	18	0	1	17	15	81	−66	1	

Source: League1 Ontario
Rules for classification: 1) points; 2) total wins; 3) goal differential; 4) goals for; 5) away goals differential; 6) away goals for; 7) home goals differential; 8) home goals for; 9) head-to-head record; 10) coin toss or drawing of lots.
(C) Champions

=== Playoffs ===
The top two seeds will earn a bye directly to the second round. After the first round, the teams will be re-seeded with NDC Ontario (the regular season champion) playing the lowest ranked remaining seed.

Quarter-finals; July 26–27
3	North Toronto Nitros	0(3)
6	FC London	0(4)
4	Alliance United FC	1(5)
5	Woodbridge Strikers	1(3)

Semi-finals; July 30
1	NDC Ontario	4
6	FC London	0
2	Vaughan Azzurri	1
4	Alliance United FC	2

Final; August 5
1	NDC Ontario	1
4	Alliance United FC (a.e.t.)	2

Quarter-finals

July 26, 2023	Alliance United FC	1–1 (5–3 p)	Woodbridge Strikers	Vaughan, Ontario
9:00 PM	Windebank 67'	Report	Rogers 52'	Stadium: Ontario Soccer Centre
	Penalties
	Chown (penalty scored); Gosse (penalty scored); Whelan (penalty scored); Cheung (penalty scored) (penalty scored)		Rogers (penalty scored); Lisi (penalty scored); Yaacoub (penalty scored); Dennehy (penalty missed)

July 27, 2022	North Toronto Nitros	0–0 (3–4 p)	FC London	Toronto, Ontario
8:00 PM		Report		Stadium: Downsview Park
	Penalties
	McCausland (penalty scored); Perez (penalty scored); DeBoer (penalty missed); Golen (penalty scored); Poon (penalty missed)		Cromack (penalty scored); Bilotta (penalty missed); Scott (penalty scored); Bower (penalty scored); Gunnel (penalty scored)

Semi-finals

July 30, 2022	NDC Ontario	4–0	FC London	Brampton, Ontario
8:00 PM	Istocki 49'; A.Chukwu 52', 60'; Markesini 82'	Report		Stadium: Save Max Sports Centre

July 30, 2022	Vaughan Azzurri	1–2	Alliance United FC	Vaughan, Ontario
4:00 PM	Fleming-Thompson 62'	Report	Gosse 41'; Parkes 89'	Stadium: North Maple Regional Park; Referee: Roain Satarzadeh

Final

August 5, 2023	NDC Ontario	1–2 (a.e.t.)	Alliance United FC	Vaughan, Ontario
7:00 PM	Greco 52'	Report	Chan 90+5'; Chown 101'	Stadium: Ontario Soccer Centre; Referee: Amanda Kwan

=== Statistics ===
==== Top goalscorers ====
Rank	Player	Club	Goals
1	Jayda Thompson	Woodbridge Strikers	18
2	Jessica Lisi	Woodbridge Strikers	13
3	Madison Mariani	Alliance United	11
3	Leah Pais	Vaughan Azzurri	11
3	Stefanie Young	Blue Devils FC	11
6	Nia Fleming-Thompson	Vaughan Azzurri	10
6	Victoria Hinchliffe	Guelph Union	10
6	Isabella Mazzaferro	North Toronto Nitros	10
6	Kiyomi McCausland	North Toronto Nitros	10
10	Charlotte Cromack	FC London	9
10	Courtney Chochol	Simcoe County Rovers	9

Updated to end of regular season. Source: League1 Ontario

==== Top goalkeepers ====
Rank	Player	Club	Minutes	GAA
1	Noelle Henning	NDC Ontario	651	0.55
2	Anika Toth	Woodbridge Strikers	990	0.73
3	Gurleen Toor	Alliance United	1171	0.77
4	Breanne Carreiro	Electric City FC	1556	0.87
5	Mykaela Volpe	Simcoe County Rovers	810	1.00

Updated to end of regular season. Minimum 630 minutes played. Source:

=== League honours ===
==== Awards ====
Award	Player	Team	Ref
Most Valuable Player	Gurleen Toor	Alliance United FC	
Young Player of the Year (U20)	Gurleen Toor	Alliance United FC	
Coach of the Year	Angelo Cavalluzzo	Alliance United FC	
Goalkeeper of the Year	Gurleen Toor	Alliance United FC	
Defender of the Year	Zoe Markesini	NDC Ontario	
Midfielder of the Year	Cloey Uddenberg	Simcoe County Rovers FC	
Forward of the Year	Jayda Thompson	Woodbridge Strikers	
Golden Boot (Top Scorer)	Jayda Thompson	Woodbridge Strikers	

==== League All-Stars ====
The following players were named League1 Ontario Premier Division All-Stars for the 2023 season:

First Team All-Stars

Player	Position
Gurleen Toor (Alliance United)	Goalkeeper
Jenny Wolevel (Alliance United)	Defender
Laura Gosse (Alliance United)	Defender
Zoe Markesini (NDC Ontario)	Defender
Trinity Esprit (Simcoe County Rovers)	Defender
Alanna Raimondo (NDC Ontario)	Midfielder
Cloey Uddenberg (Simcoe County Rovers)	Midfielder
Jotam Chouhan (Vaughan Azzurri)	Midfielder
Leah Pais (Vaughan Azzurri)	Midfielder
Nia Fleming-Thompson (Vaughan Azzurri)	Forward
Jayda Thompson (Woodbridge Strikers)	Forward

Second Team All-Stars

Player	Position
Mollie Eriksson (North Mississauga)	Goalkeeper
Kennedi Herrmann (North Mississauga)	Defender
Hannah Chown (Alliance United)	Defender
Sarah Rollins (North Toronto Nitros)	Defender
Ida Miceli (Woodbridge Strikers)	Defender
Laura Twidle (Blue Devils)	Midfielder
April Syme (Woodbridge Strikers)	Midfielder
Courtney Poon (North Toronto Nitros)	Midfielder
Charlotte Cromack (FC London)	Midfielder
Jessica Lisi (Woodbridge Strikers)	Forward
Madison Mariani (Alliance United)	Forward

=== Future format and changes ===
Starting in 2024, the league will split into a multi-division format with promotion and relegation between them. Ten teams will take part in the first-tier League1 Premier, ten teams in the second-tier League1 Championship, and all new expansion teams as well as reserve sides in a third-tier League2 Ontario.

The initial assignment of teams in the 2024 season is done by using the points obtained in the previous two years. The points from the 2022 season (weighted at 75%) will be added to the points teams obtain in the 2023 season (weighted at 100%) to determine the placements.

Pos	Team	GP	2022	2023	Total	Qualification
1	Vaughan Azzurri	37	36	44	80	Qualification to 2024 League1 Premier
2	NDC Ontario	37	34.5	45	79.5	Qualification to 2024 League1 Premier
3	Woodbridge Strikers	37	31.5	34	65.5	Qualification to 2024 League1 Premier
4	North Toronto Nitros	37	27	38	65	Qualification to 2024 League1 Premier
5	Alliance United FC	37	27.75	35	62.75	Qualification to 2024 League1 Premier
6	FC London	37	30.75	32	62.75	Qualification to 2024 League1 Premier
7	Simcoe County Rovers FC	37	30.75	28	58.75	Qualification to 2024 League1 Premier
8	Electric City FC	37	24	27	51	Folded after season
9	North Mississauga SC	37	21	27	48	Qualification to 2024 League1 Premier
10	Guelph Union	37	18	24	42	Qualification to 2024 League1 Premier
11	St. Catharines Roma Wolves (Note: St. Catharines Roma Wolves initially qualified for the League1 Championship. However, they were later promoted to the Premier Division to replace Electric City, upon their folding. However, they later chose to self-relegate to League2 Ontario)	37	18.75	21	39.75	Self-relegated to 2024 League2 Ontario
12	Blue Devils FC (Note: Blue Devils FC initially qualified for the League1 Championship. However, they were later promoted to the Premier Division to replace St. Catherines Roma, upon their decision to self-relegate to League2 Ontario.)	37	14.25	24	38.25	Qualification to 2024 League1 Premier
13	Unionville Milliken SC (Note: Darby and Unionville-Milliken did not play their match against each other in 2022.)	36	16.5	21	37.5	Qualification to 2024 League1 Championship
14	Darby FC	36	20.25	16	36.25	Qualification to 2024 League1 Championship
15	BVB IA Waterloo	37	11.25	24	35.25	Qualification to 2024 League1 Championship
16	Tecumseh SC	37	18.75	14	32.75	Qualification to 2024 League1 Championship
17	Hamilton United	37	7.5	18	25.5	Qualification to 2024 League1 Championship
18	Burlington SC	37	2.25	11	13.25	Qualification to 2024 League1 Championship
19	ProStars FC	37	4.5	1	5.5	Qualification to 2024 League1 Championship
20	Pickering FC (Note: Pickering FC did not compete in the 2023 season. Their L1O license for 2024 was revoked. However, they later purchased a new license to enter the L1O-C for 2024.) (Z)	19	9	—	9	Ineligible for Qualification

(Z) L1O license for 2024 revoked

== Reserve Division ==
The Open Age Reserve Division will return with each Premier Division club fielding one or more teams, as well as some other OPDL clubs that do not operate a League1 Ontario team.

=== North East Division ===
Pos	Team	Pld	W	D	L	GF	GA	GD	Pts	Qualification
1	Alliance United FC B	14	12	2	0	52	10	+42	38	Advance to playoffs
2	Simcoe County Rovers FC B1	14	10	3	1	41	12	+29	33	
3	Electric City FC B	14	10	1	3	34	16	+18	31	
4	Pickering FC	14	6	1	7	24	25	−1	19	
5	Aurora FC	13	5	0	8	19	22	−3	15	
6	Unionville Milliken SC B	14	3	0	11	13	41	−28	9	
7	Master's FA	14	2	2	10	9	36	−27	8	
8	Darby FC B	13	2	1	10	12	42	−30	7	

Updated to match(es) played on July 25, 2023. Source: League1 Ontario

=== Central Division ===
Pos	Team	Pld	W	D	L	GF	GA	GD	Pts	Qualification
1	North Toronto Nitros B (C)	13	13	0	0	60	8	+52	39	Advance to playoffs
2	Woodbridge Strikers B	14	8	1	5	30	18	+12	25	
3	Vaughan Azzurri B	13	6	2	5	19	15	+4	20	
4	North Mississauga SC B	13	5	2	6	18	27	−9	17	
5	Blue Devils FC B	13	5	2	6	10	31	−21	17	
6	Simcoe County Rovers FC B2	13	4	1	8	15	28	−13	13	
7	ProStars FC B	13	3	2	8	13	21	−8	11	
8	Rush Canada	12	2	2	8	11	28	−17	8	

Updated to match(es) played on July 25, 2023. Source: League1 Ontario
(C) Champions

=== South West Division ===
Pos	Team	Pld	W	D	L	GF	GA	GD	Pts	Qualification
1	BVB IA Waterloo B	14	12	1	1	55	9	+46	37	Advance to playoffs
2	Whitecaps London	14	11	0	3	39	18	+21	33	Advance to playoffs
3	Cambridge United	14	9	1	4	36	18	+18	28	
4	FC London B	14	7	0	7	31	31	0	21	
5	Hamilton United B	14	4	5	5	22	32	−10	17	
6	Burlington SC B	14	4	2	8	13	29	−16	14	
7	St. Catharines Roma Wolves B	14	3	1	10	20	31	−11	10	
8	Scrosoppi FC	14	1	0	13	17	65	−48	3	

Updated to match(es) played on July 25, 2023. Source: League1 Ontario

=== Playoffs ===
Semifinals; July 23-27
C1	North Toronto Nitros B	3
WC	Whitecaps London	2
NE1	Alliance United FC B	3
SW1	BVB IA Waterloo B	0

Championship Game; August 3
C1	North Toronto Nitros B	5
NE1	Alliance United FC B	0

== U19 Reserve Division ==
=== Summer Division ===
==== East Division ====
Pos	Team	Pld	W	D	L	GF	GA	GD	Pts	Qualification
1	Pickering FC U19 (C)	12	10	1	1	27	5	+22	31	Advance to playoffs
2	North Toronto Nitros U19	12	8	2	2	42	7	+35	26	Advance to playoffs
3	Vaughan Azzurri U19	12	5	1	6	23	15	+8	16	
4	FC Durham U19	12	4	4	4	16	14	+2	16	
5	Unionville Milliken SC U19	12	4	3	5	19	22	−3	15	
6	Woodbridge Strikers U19	12	4	2	6	29	21	+8	14	
7	Darby FC U19	12	0	1	11	2	74	−72	1	

Source: League1 Ontario
(C) Champions

==== West Division ====
Pos	Team	Pld	W	D	L	GF	GA	GD	Pts	Qualification
1	Tecumseh SC U19	12	8	3	1	41	17	+24	27	Advance to playoffs
2	Rush Canada U19	12	8	1	3	35	17	+18	25	Advance to playoffs
3	North Mississauga SC U19	12	8	1	3	34	17	+17	25	
4	Oakville SC U19	12	4	2	6	18	23	−5	14	
5	Hamilton United U19	12	4	2	6	17	25	−8	14	
6	Windsor City FC U19	12	4	1	7	25	27	−2	13	
7	St. Catharines Roma Wolves U19	12	1	0	11	14	58	−44	3	

Source: League1 Ontario

==== Playoffs ====
Semifinals; August 1-2
E1	Pickering FC U19	0(4)
W2	Rush Canada U19	0(2)
W1	Tecumseh SC U19	0
E2	North Toronto Nitros U19	2

Championship Game; August 7
E1	Pickering FC U19	1(6)
E2	North Toronto Nitros U19	1(5)

=== Fall Division ===
Pos	Team	Pld	W	D	L	GF	GA	GD	Pts	Qualification
1	North Toronto Nitros U19	12	11	1	0	42	10	+32	34	Advance to playoffs
2	Rush Canada U19 (C)	12	6	3	3	33	17	+16	21	Advance to playoffs
3	Unionville Milliken SC U19	11	4	2	5	28	31	−3	14	
4	North Mississauga SC U19	11	3	2	6	18	23	−5	11	
5	Hamilton United U19	10	0	0	10	6	46	−40	0	

Source: League1 Ontario
(C) Champions

==== Playoffs ====
Championship Game; November 18
1	North Toronto Nitros U19	2
2	Rush Canada U19	4
