= Alon Badat =

Israeli footballer (born 1989)

Alon Badat אלון בדאת
Personal information
- Date of birth: 3 December 1989 (age 36)
- Place of birth: Herzliya Pituah, Israel
- Position: Midfielder

Youth career
- ANB Futbol
- 2007–2008: Maccabi Netanya F.C.

College career
Years	Team	Apps	(Gls)
2010–2011	York Lions	28	(23)
2012–2013	Bradley Braves	17	(7)

Senior career*
Years	Team	Apps	(Gls)
2008–2009	Ironi Kiryat Ata F.C.	4	(0)
2009	North York Astros		
2010–2012	Portugal FC/SC Toronto		
2016	Scarborough SC		
2016	Vaughan Azzurri	1	(0)
2017–	FC Ukraine United		
- * Club domestic league appearances and goals as of 29 November 2017

Alon Badat
Medal record

Representing Canada

Football

Maccabiah Games
Bronze medal – third place	2013 Maccabiah	Football

Alon Badat (Hebrew: אלון בדאת; born December 3, 1989) is an Israeli footballer who plays with FC Ukraine United in the Canadian Soccer League. He played college soccer for York University, with whom he was a U Sports Championship All Star, the Ontario University Athletics (OUA) West Rookie of the Year, and Bradley University in Illinois. He has also played professional soccer with Ironi Kiryat Ata F.C., the North York Astros, Portugal FC/SC Toronto, Scarborough SC, and Vaughan Azzurri. He won a bronze medal with Team Canada at the 2013 Maccabiah Games in Jerusalem, Israel.

== Early life ==
Badat was born in Israel, and moved to Canada at 10 years of age. For high school he attended Westmount Collegiate Institute in Thornhill, Ontario, Canada. His hometown is Thornhill.

== Career ==
After having spent some time with the youth system of Canadian ANB Futbol, in 2007, at 17 years of age, Badat joined the youth system of Israeli Maccabi Netanya F.C. He later played in the Liga Leumit with Ironi Kiryat Ata F.C., where he appeared in four matches. In 2009, he played in the Canadian Soccer League with North York Astros.

At the conclusion of the season he enrolled to play college soccer with the York Lions in Toronto, Canada. During his tenure with York University, where he studied finance, in 2010 he was named a U Sports Championship All Star, the Ontario University Athletics (OUA) West Rookie of the Year, and an OUA West Second-Team All-Star. He tied for third in the OUA West in scoring, with 9 goals in 14 games. In 2011 he was a First-Team OUA all-star and Second-Team CIS U Sports All-Canadian, and was second in the OUA with 14 goals in 14 games.

In 2012, he transferred to Bradley University in Peoria, Illinois, to play with Bradley Braves. During the college off-season he played in the CSL with SC Toronto, where in 2011 he won the regular season title. In 2013 he was MVC Men's Soccer Second Team All-Conference.

In 2016, he played in Canada with Scarborough SC, and finished off the season in League1 Ontario with Vaughan Azzurri. The following season he played in the CSL Second Division with FC Ukraine United.

=== International ===
He played for Team Canada at the 2013 Maccabiah Games in Jerusalem, Israel, winning a bronze medal.

=== Awards ===
- Jewish Sports Review All-America First Team: 2013
- NSCAA Scholar All-North/Central Region Second Team: 2013
- All-Missouri Valley Conference (MVC) 2nd Team: 2013
- MVC Offensive Player of the Week: Oct. 21, 2013
- UNLV Nike Invitational All-Tournament Team: 2013
- MVC Honor Roll: 2014
