= Kelsey Araujo =

Canadian-born Portuguese footballer

Personal information
- Full name: Kelsey Beth Araújo
- Date of birth: April 3, 1998 (age 28)
- Place of birth: Newmarket, Ontario, Canada
- Height: 1.68 m (5 ft 6 in)
- Position: Forward

College career
Years	Team	Apps	(Gls)
2016–2021	Niagara Purple Eagles	62	(17)

Senior career*
Years	Team	Apps	(Gls)
2021	FC Buffalo	8	(12)
2021–2023	Le Havre AC	40	(16)

International career
2022–	Portugal	1	(0)
- * Club domestic league appearances and goals

Kelsey Beth Araujo (born 3 April 1998) is a footballer who plays as a striker. Born in Canada, she is a Portugal international.

== Early life ==
Araujo was born in Canada to Portuguese parents and was raised there. At the age of four, she started playing football, before joining the youth academy of Canadian side ANB Futbol.

While playing for Holy Trinity Catholic High School, she trained with the youth academy of French side OL and received interest from a British team.

== College career ==
Araujo played for Niagara Purple Eagles, where she scored seventeen goals and recorded eleven assists.

== Club career ==
Araujo began the summer of 2021 in the short season league UWS with FC Buffalo and was the team's leading goal scorer in the Blitzers' inaugural season en route to an East Conference title and a loss in the UWS Conference Final - two matches shy of a National Championship appearance. In the fall ahead of the 2021/22, Araujo signed for French second-tier side Le Havre, helping them earn promotion to the French top flight and becoming known as their main spearheads in attack.

== International career ==
In 2022, Araujo debuted for the Portugal women's national football team.

== Style of play ==
Araujo mainly operates as a striker but can also operate as a playmaker and is known for her versatility.

== Personal life ==
Her relatives mainly reside in North America. On August 10, 2024, Kelsey got engaged to boyfriend Bautista Pedezert per both of their Instagram profiles.

In 2024, she was selected as one of the Simcoe Muskoka Catholic District School Board’s Outstanding Graduates program recipients.
