= ANB Futbol =

Canadian semi-professional soccer club

- Full name: ANB Futbol Academy
- Founded: 2007
- League: League1 Ontario
- 2015: League1 Ontario, 6th Cup: Semi-finals
- Website: www.anbfutbol.com

ANB Futbol was a Canadian semi-professional soccer club based in King, Ontario. The club was founded in 2007, as a soccer academy, and added its semi-professional club in League1 Ontario in 2014.

The club was one of the ten original founding men's teams in League1 Ontario, which was established in 2014, as well as one of eight original founding women’s teams in the women's division, which was established in 2015. Both teams withdrew from the league following the 2015 season. The club continues to remain active as a youth soccer academy.

== History ==
In 2007, ANB Futbol was launched as the academy division of parent company ANB Soccer Inc. by founder Bassam Naim.

In 2014, the semi-professional club was established to play in the newly formed League1 Ontario as one of the founding members. They were one of the three Ontario Soccer Association Recognized Non-Club Academies permitted to enter a team in the league, as well as one of three original clubs located in York Region. The club was based out of The Country Day School, but had to play its home matches out of the OSA Centre in Vaughan due to league stadium and lighting requirements. They played their inaugural match on June 1, 2014 against Woodbridge Strikers.

They added a women's club to participate in the inaugural League1 Ontario women's season. ANB Futbol did not renew their league license for the 2016 for either team, ending their participation in the league.

In 2021, they formed a partnership with League1 Ontario club 1812 FC Barrie, being set to take over and manage all aspects of 1812's technical staff beginning in the 2022 season, however, in early 2022, 1812 FC ceased operations and departed League1 Ontario.

== Seasons ==
Men

Season	League	Teams	Record	Rank	Playoffs	League Cup	Ref
2014	League1 Ontario	9	6–4–6	5th	–	Group Stage	
2015	League1 Ontario	12	12–3–7	6th	–	Semi-finals	

Women

Season	League	Teams	Record	Rank	Playoffs	League Cup	Ref
2015	League1 Ontario	7	4–1–13	5th	–	Group Stage	

== Notable former players ==
The following players have either played at the professional or international level, either before or after playing for the League1 Ontario team:

- (England) Oladapo Afolayan
- (Canada) Raheem Edwards
- (Canada) Adonijah Reid
