= Vaughan Azzurri =

Canadian soccer team

- Full name: Vaughan Soccer Club
- Founded: 1982 (youth); 2014
- Stadium: North Maple Regional Park; Vaughan, Ontario
- Capacity: 500
- Coordinates: 43.8832°N 79.5188°W
- Affiliation: Vaughan Soccer Club
- Club president: Tony Bartolomeo
- Head coach: Sergio De Luca (men); Carmine Isacco (women)
- League: Ontario Premier League
- 2025: L1O-P, 6th (men); L1O-P, 5th (women)
- Website: vaughansoccer.com
Home colours	Away colours

Vaughan Azzurri is a Canadian semi-professional soccer team based in Vaughan, Ontario, that currently competes in the Ontario Premier League men's and women's divisions. The semi-professional team was founded in 2014 by the Vaughan Soccer Club, which is a youth soccer club as part of their High Performance Program.

== History ==
Vaughan Soccer Club was founded in 1982 as a youth soccer club under the name Concord Jets. In 1986, they renamed to Vaughan SC. Since 1986, the club continued to grow and by 2012, became the second-largest soccer club in York Region.

=== Men's semi-pro team ===
They added their semi-professional club, under the name Vaughan Azzurri, to play in League1 Ontario in the inaugural season in 2014, originally playing out of McNaughton Park. They won the inaugural League1 Ontario League Cup defeating Sigma FC 2–1 in the final at BMO Field. They won their first league title in 2016, defeating FC London in the playoff final. This qualified them for the Inter-Provincial championship to face the champions of the Première Ligue de soccer du Québec champion CS Mont-Royal Outremont for the Canadian Division III title, where they lost over the two-legged fixture. Since then, the Azzurri have won a league-tying two League1 Ontario Championships and a league-leading three L1 Cups.

During the 2018 season, they played a friendly against Italian professional Serie A club Frosinone Calcio, losing by a score of 2–1, although Vaughan managed to take an early 1–0 lead in the match.

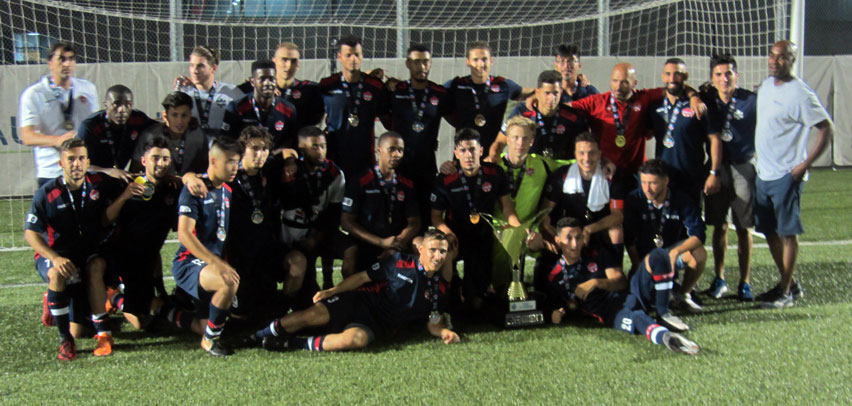
Vaughan Azzurri wins 2018 men's L1O League Cup

From 2014 to 2018, the club was led by head coach Carmine Isacco. Following the 2018 season, Isacco left Vaughan to join the newly founded York9 FC as an assistant coach. In spring 2019, it was announced that previous First Team assistant coach and U21 head coach Patrice Gheisar would take over First Team operations.

Having won the 2018 League1 Ontario Championship, the Azzurri were awarded a berth to the first qualifying round of 2019 Canadian Championship. They played HFX Wanderers FC of the Canadian Premier League in a two-legged series and hosted their home match at the Ontario Soccer Centre. They lost the first leg 3–2 at home after HFX scored a stoppage time penalty kick, but won the return leg in Halifax 1–0, being the first semi-professional club to defeat a professional side in the tournament. The two clubs drew 3–3 on aggregate but Vaughan failed to advance due to the away goals rule.

At the 2020 MLS SuperDraft, Vaughan had four of their players selected in the first round of the draft. The Azzurri men went undefeated in the regular seasons of both 2021 and 2022, winning the playoff championship in 2022. In 2024, Vaughan won the League Cup (in the first edition since 2018).

=== Women's semi-pro team ===
They added a women's club to participate in the inaugural 2015 season of the League1 Ontario women's division. The women won the 2016 League Cup. They finished first in the 2022 regular season, winning the Supporter's Trophy as regular season champions, but were defeated in the playoff semi-finals by Alliance United. In 2024, the women's B team won the first edition of the third tier League2 Ontario, earning promotion to the second tier League1 Ontario Championship.

== Seasons ==
=== Men ===
Season	League	Teams	Record	Rank	Playoffs	League Cup	National / Other		Ref
2014	League1 Ontario	9	8–3–5	4th	–	Champions	did not qualify		
2015	League1 Ontario	12	12–7–3	3rd	–	Quarter-finals	did not qualify		
2016	League1 Ontario	16	17–4–1	1st, East (1st overall)	Champions	Champions	Inter-Provincial Cup	RU	
2017	League1 Ontario	16	16–1–5	2nd, East (4th overall)	did not qualify	Runner-up	Ineligible		
2018	League1 Ontario	17	10–1–5	5th	Champions	Champions	did not qualify		
2019	League1 Ontario	16	12–1–2	2nd	Quarter-finals	–	Canadian Championship	R1	
2020	Season cancelled due to COVID-19 pandemic								
2021	League1 Ontario	15	11–1–0	1st, East (1st)	Semi-finals	–	did not qualify		
2022	League1 Ontario	22	18–3–0	1st	Champions	–	did not qualify		
2023	League1 Ontario	21	14–3–3	3rd	Semi-finals	–	Canadian Championship	R1	
2024	League1 Ontario Premier	12	14–7–1	2nd	–	Champions	did not qualify		
2025	League1 Ontario Premier	11	8–5–7	6th	–	Finalists	did not qualify		

=== Women ===
Season	League	Teams	Record	Rank	Playoffs	League Cup	Ref
2015	League1 Ontario	7	10–5–3	3rd	–	Finalists	
2016	League1 Ontario	9	8–5–3	4th	–	Champions	
2017	League1 Ontario	11	12–3–5	2nd	–	Semi-finals	
2018	League1 Ontario	13	8–0–4	3rd	Semi-finals	Semi-finals	
2019	League1 Ontario	14	10–1–2	2nd	Semi-finals	–	
2020	Season cancelled due to COVID-19 pandemic						
2021	League1 Ontario	7	6–2–4	3rd	Semi-finals	–	
2022	League1 Ontario	20	15–3–1	1st	Finalists	–	
2023	League1 Ontario	19	14–2–2	2nd	Semi-finals	–	
2024	League1 Ontario Premier	10	6–7–5	5th	–	Quarter-finals	
2025	League1 Ontario Premier	10	8–2–8	5th	–	Quarter-finals	

== Honours ==
- League1 Ontario Championship (3): 2016, 2018, 2022
- L1 Cup (4): 2014, 2016, 2018, 2024

== Notable players ==
The following players have either played at the professional or international level, either before or after playing for the League1 Ontario team:

=== Men ===
- (Canada) Matthew Arnone
- (Cuba) Andy Baquero
- (Israel) Alon Badat
- (England) Ethan Beckford
- (Cuba) Orlendis Benítez
- (Canada) Gabriel Boakye
- (Guyana) Adrian Butters
- (Canada) Dylan Carreiro
- (Canada) Gianluca Catalano
- (Canada) Klaidi Cela
- (Canada) Joseph Di Chiara
- (Canada) Zak Drake
- (Canada) Duwayne Ewart
- (Canada) Daniel Fabrizi
- (Canada) Riley Ferrazzo
- (Canada) Massimo Ferrin
- (Canada) Marcus Godinho
- (Canada) Daniel Gogarty
- (Canada) A. J. Gray
- (Canada) Dayonn Harris
- (Canada) Jordan Haynes
- (Canada) Nyal Higgins
- (Canada) Brandon John
- (Canada) Alistair Johnston
- (Canada) Malcolm Johnston
- (Canada) John Jonke
- (Guyana) (Canada) Ryan Khedoo
- (Canada) Jace Kotsopoulos
- (Canada) Maksym Kowal
- (Canada) Mathieu Laurent
- (Canada) Duran Lee
- (Canada) Andrea Lombardo
- (Canada) Baj Maan
- (Canada) Chris Mannella
- (Canada) Kamal Miller
- (Canada) Massimo Mirabelli
- (Canada) David Monsalve
- (Nigeria) Kosi Nwafornso
- (Canada) Andrew Ornoch
- (Canada) Anthony Osorio
- (Canada) Jarred Phillips
- (Cuba) Alejandro Portal
- (Canada) Ryan Raposo
- (Canada) Ryan Robinson
- (Canada) Austin Ricci
- (Canada) Dylan Sacramento
- (Saint Kitts and Nevis) Alain Sargeant
- (Canada) Tomasz Skublak
- (Canada) C. J. Smith
- (Guyana) Jamaal Smith
- (Saint Kitts and Nevis) Justin Springer
- (Canada) Dayne St. Clair
- (Canada) Matt Stinson
- (Trinidad and Tobago) Ryan Telfer
- (Canada) Colm Vance
- (Canada) David Velastegui
- (Canada) Reshaun Walkes
- (Canada) Marcel Zajac
- (Canada) (Greece) Emmanuel Zambazis

=== Women ===
- (Latvia) (Canada) Nora Abolins
- (Canada) Kadeisha Buchanan
- (Croatia) (Canada) Stephanie Bukovec
- (Guyana) (Canada) Calaigh Copland
- (Guyana) (Canada) Brianne Desa
- (Guyana) (Canada) Briana DeSouza
- (Guyana) (Canada) Kayla DeSouza
- (Guyana) (Canada) Raven Edwards-Dowdall
- (Saint Kitts and Nevis) (Canada) Quinn Josiah
- (Canada) Anna Karpenko
- (Dominica) Selena Lancaster
- (Canada) Ashley Lawrence
- (Guyana) (Canada) Serena McDonald
- (Afghanistan) Farkhunda Muhtaj
- (Canada) Leah Pais
- (Dominican Republic) (Canada) Yoana Peralta
- (Guyana) (Canada) Justine Rodrigues
- (Guyana) (Canada) Kayla Uddenberg
- (Guyana) (Canada) Bria Williams
