= Nora Abolins =

Canadian-Latvian footballer (born 1992)

Personal information
- Full name: Nora Sylvia Abolins
- Date of birth: 26 January 1992 (age 34)
- Place of birth: Belleville, Ontario, Canada
- Height: 1.73 m (5 ft 8 in)
- Position: Goalkeeper

Youth career
- 2004-?: Belleville Youth SC
- Toronto Jr. Lady Lynx
- Kingston Football Club

College career
Years	Team	Apps	(Gls)
2010–2012	Detroit Mercy Titans		
2013	Western Kentucky Lady Toppers	20	(0)

Senior career*
Years	Team	Apps	(Gls)
2015	Durham United FC	18	(0)
2016	QBIK	24	(0)
2017	Östersunds DFF	13	(0)
2017	KIF Örebro	1	(0)
2021	Vaughan Azzurri	3	(0)

International career^{‡}
2016–2018	Latvia	3	(0)

Managerial career
- 2018: Ryerson Rams (women, assistant coach)
- * Club domestic league appearances and goals as of 31 December 2021 ‡ National team caps and goals as of 4 March 2018

Nora Sylvia Abolins (Latvian: Nora Silvija Āboliņa; born 7 December 1992) is a footballer who played as a goalkeeper. Born in Canada, she represented the Latvia national team.

== Early life ==
Abolins was raised in Demorestville, Ontario.

== College career ==
Abolins attended the University of Detroit Mercy in Detroit, Michigan and the Western Kentucky University in Bowling Green, Kentucky, both of them in the United States.

== Club career ==
In 2015, she joined Durham United FC of League1 Ontario. She helped lead the team to win the league title, playing all 18 league matches, while only conceding eight goals against. Her performance resulted in her being named the League1 Ontario Goalkeeper of the Year and league Most Valuable Player honours.

Her performance with Durham attracted the attention of European teams and she joined QIBK Karlstad in the Elitettan, the Swedish second division in 2016. In 2017, she joined another Swedish side, Östersunds DFF. She later joined KIF Örebro of the top tier Damallsvenskan.

In 2021, she returned to League1 Ontario with Vaughan Azzurri.

== International career ==
Her performance led to her being called up to the Latvian national team in the Baltic Cup and the Turkish women's national team tournament.

== Coaching career ==
Afterwards, she joined Ryerson University as an assistant coach.
