= Kashiff De Jonge =

Canadian-Guyanese soccer player

Kashiff Collins
Personal information
- Full name: Kashiff de Jonge
- Date of birth: January 12, 1989 (age 37)
- Place of birth: Ajax, Ontario, Canada
- Height: 5 ft 9 in (1.75 m)
- Position: Striker

Team information
- Current team: Darby FC

College career
Years	Team	Apps	(Gls)
2013–2014	Durham Lords	8	(4)

Senior career*
Years	Team	Apps	(Gls)
2009	Alpha United		
2015–2017	Durham United FA	35+	(12+)
2018–2024	Darby FC	60	(32)

International career
2012	Guyana	1	(0)
- * Club domestic league appearances and goals as of July 5, 2024

Kashiff de Jonge, also known as Kashiff Collins, is a soccer player who plays as a striker. Born in Canada, he was a Guyana international.

== College career ==
He attended Durham College playing for the men's soccer team. In 2013, he scored the winning goal in the shootout to help them win the Campus Cup, earning Athlete of the Week honours. On October 2, 2013, he scored two goals in a 2–0 victory over George Brown College. He scored four goals in eight regular season games, to co-lead his team, with the team ultimately losing to Fleming in the playoffs. He was named Durham's MVP for the season.

== Club career ==
In 2009, he joined Guyanese club Alpha United.

In 2015, he began playing for Durham United in League1 Ontario. On June 19, 2016, he scored four goals in a 7–3 victory over Toronto FC III. He finished the 2016 season with nine goals in 20 league matches, being named a league First-Team All-Star at the end of the season. In 2017, he had 3 goals in 15 league matches.

In 2018, he joined Darby FC, finishing the season with 3 goals in 7 league matches. In 2019, he scored 5 goals in 11 league games, including four goals in an 8–0 victory over Toronto Skillz FC on the final matchday of the season on August 18. In 2021, he scored four goals in seven league matches, including a hat trick in a 6–1 victory over 1812 FC Barrie on October 23. In 2022, he scored once in 10 appearances. In 2023, he returned again.

== International career ==
In 2012, he was called up to the Guyana national team for the first time.
