= Kayla De Souza =

Canadian-Guyanese footballer (born 1990)

Personal information
- Full name: Kayla Ashley De Souza
- Date of birth: 7 March 1990 (age 36)
- Place of birth: Scarborough, Ontario, Canada
- Height: 1.57 m (5 ft 2 in)
- Position: Midfielder

Team information
- Current team: Unionville Milliken SC
- Number: 6

Youth career
- Pickering SC

College career
Years	Team	Apps	(Gls)
2013–2014	UOIT Ridgebacks	28	(5)

Senior career*
Years	Team	Apps	(Gls)
2015–2019	Durham United FA	42+	(2)
2021	Vaughan Azzurri	7	(0)
2022–2024	North Mississauga SC	20	(0)
2025–	Unionville Milliken SC	1	(0)

International career^{‡}
2010–	Guyana	13+	(1)
- * Club domestic league appearances and goals as of April 26, 2025 ‡ National team caps and goals as of 14:02, 15 April 2022 (UTC)

Kayla De Souza (born 7 March 1990) is a footballer who plays for Unionville Milliken SC in League1 Ontario. Born in Canada, she represented Guyana at international level.

== University career ==
De Souza turned down scholarship opportunities to play in the United States for personal reasons. In 2013, she began attending Ontario Tech University, playing for the women's soccer team for two season. In 2014, she was an OUA All-Star and won an OUA bronze medal, as the Ridgebacks advanced to the U SPORTS championship for the first time in program history. She scored five goals in 28 games over her two seasons.

== Club career ==
From 2015 to 2019, she played for Durham United FA in League1 Ontario, during which she served as team captain. In 2015, she scored one goal and was named League1 Ontario Defender of the Year and a league First Team All-Star, as Durham won the league title. In 2016, she played 16 games and was a league Second Team All-Star. In 2017 she played 11 games, in 2018, she played five games, and in 2019, she appeared in ten games. She scored a goal on May 13, 2017, against West Ottawa SC.

In 2021, she played for Vaughan Azzurri.

In 2022, she played for North Mississauga SC.

In 2025, she began playing with Unionville Milliken SC.

== International career ==
De Souza debuted with the Guyana national team in 2009. She serves as the team's captain.

=== International goals ===
Scores and results list Guyana's goal tally first

No.	Date	Venue	Opponent	Score	Result	Competition
1	21 August 2015	Estadio Panamericano, San Cristóbal, Dominican Republic	Saint Kitts and Nevis	5–0	8–0	2016 CONCACAF Women's Olympic Qualifying Championship qualification

== Personal life ==
De Souza is of Guyanese heritage on her father's side and Italian heritage on her mother's side. She is the sister of fellow Guyana national team player Briana De Souza.

== See also ==
- List of Guyana women's international footballers
