= Leaford Allen =

Canadian soccer player (born 1995)

Personal information
- Date of birth: 9 May 1995 (age 31)
- Place of birth: Brampton, Ontario, Canada
- Height: 1.85 m (6 ft 1 in)
- Position: Forward

Team information
- Current team: Sigma FC

Youth career
- Erin Mills SC

College career
Years	Team	Apps	(Gls)
2014	Windsor Lancers	13	(3)
2019–2022	Humber Hawks	12	(17)

Senior career*
Years	Team	Apps	(Gls)
2013	Brampton City United II		
2014	Brampton City United	13	(7)
2015	ProStars FC		(9)
2016	Sigma FC	16	(17)
2017	Tenhults IF	18	(12)
2018	Nässjö FF	27	(19)
2019	Sigma FC	15	(10)
2021	Blue Devils FC	8	(7)
2022	Simcoe County Rovers	3	(2)
2022	Napier City Rovers	19	(9)
2023	Cebu	8	(1)
2024	Burlington SC	19	(4)
2025–	Canadian Crusaders (indoor)	17	(30)
2025–	Sigma FC	9	(4)
- * Club domestic league appearances and goals as of April 11, 2026

Leaford Allen (born 9 May 1995) is a Canadian professional soccer player currently playing as a forward for Sigma FC in League1 Ontario.

== College career ==
Allen played at the college level originally with the Windsor Lancers in 2014. He returned to play college soccer in 2019 with Humber College. Throughout his tenure with the Humber Hawks, he assisted the team in securing two provincial championships.

== Club career ==
=== Early career ===
Allen began playing at the youth level with Erin Mills and participated in the 2008 Mississauga Soccer Club international tournament. He also played at the high school level with Sandalwood Heights Secondary School.

Allen played in the interprovincial Canadian Soccer League in 2013 with Brampton City United's reserve team in the Second Division. The following season he was promoted to the senior team in the First Division. He would record a hattrick in the season's opening match against SC Waterloo Region. In his debut season in the top division, he assisted the club in securing a playoff berth by finishing eighth in the standings. Brampton would be eliminated in the opening round of the postseason by the York Region Shooters. Allen finished the 2014 campaign as the club's top goal scorer with 7 goals in 13 appearances.

In 2015, he played in League1 Ontario with ProStars FC, scoring nine goals. He was named to the Second Team All-Star selection. For the following season, he played with league rivals Sigma FC. During the 2016 season, he was selected for the league's all-star match to represent the Western Conference. Throughout the all-star match, he contributed two goals and was named the match's MVP.

=== Europe ===
In early 2017, he signed a deal abroad in Sweden's Division 2 with Tenhults IF. Throughout his single season with Tenhults, he finished as the club's top goal scorer with 12 goals. He continued his stint abroad in 2018 by securing a contract with Nässjö FF. Where he finished third in the league scoring charts with 19 goals.

=== Canada ===
Following his brief stint in Europe, he returned to the southern Ontario circuit League1 Ontario to former club Sigma FC for the 2019 season. In 2021, he played with league rivals Blue Devils FC where the team reached the championship final but lost the match to Guelph United. The next season he remained in the regional circuit by signing with the expansion side, Simcoe County Rovers.

=== Abroad ===
Allen's tenure with the Barrie-based club was short-lived as he shortly after secured a deal with Napier City Rovers in New Zealand's Central League. In his debut season with Napier, he appeared in 19 matches and scored 9 goals. He also helped the club secure a berth in the National League Championship.

In 2023, he signed for Cebu in the Philippines Football League. He recorded a goal in his debut match for Cebu against Kaya F.C.–Iloilo on February 19, 2023. After a season with Cebu, he was released from his contract in the 2023 offseason.

=== Return to Canada ===
In 2024, he began playing with Burlington SC in League1 Ontario.

In 2025, he played with the Canadian Crusaders in Major League Indoor Soccer.

After the end of the indoor season, he returned to his former club Sigma FC in League1 Ontario.
