= Tyrell Rayne =

Canadian soccer player (born 1994)

Personal information
- Date of birth: August 10, 1994 (age 32)
- Place of birth: Toronto, Ontario, Canada
- Height: 1.83 m (6 ft 0 in)
- Position: Defender

Youth career
- Clairlea Westview SC
- Glen Shields SC

College career
Years	Team	Apps	(Gls)
2012	Toronto Varsity Blues	14	(2)

Senior career*
Years	Team	Apps	(Gls)
2014–2016	Master's FA		
2017	Durham United FA	20	(7)
2018–2019	Woodbridge Strikers	29	(8)

International career^{‡}
2019	Antigua and Barbuda	1	(0)
- * Club domestic league appearances and goals as of December 31, 2021 ‡ National team caps and goals as of December 31, 2021

Tyrell Rayne (born August 10, 1994) is a soccer player. Born in Canada, he represents Antigua & Barbuda internationally.

== Career ==
=== College ===
In 2012, he played for the University of Toronto Varsity Blues, playing in all 14 of the team's games, scoring two goals.

=== Club ===
In 2014, began playing in League1 Ontario with Master's FA. In 2014, he was an Honourable Mention on the league's Young Stars year-end All-Stars team. In 2015, he was named a league Second-team All-Star. In 2016, played in the league All-Star game for the East Division, and was he was once again named a league-wide Second-team All-Star, after scoring 14 goals in 18 games.

In 2017, he joined Durham United FA, with whom he scored 7 goals in 20 games, which led his team, including a hat trick on September 16 against Ottawa South United. Prior to the season, he scored a goal in an exhibition game with the League1 Ontario All-stars against professional USL club Ottawa Fury FC.

In 2018 and 2019, he played with the Woodbridge Strikers, scoring 8 goals in 29 league games, while also appearing in 5 playoff games.

=== International ===
In September 2019, he was called up to the Antigua and Barbuda national team ahead of a pair of CONCACAF Nations League games, being the only overseas player in the squad. He made his debut on September 7 against Jamaica.
