= The Country Day School =

Location
- 13415 Dufferin Street; King City, Ontario, L7B 1K5; Canada; 43.94474°N 79.50591°W

Information
- School type: Independent, non-profit
- Founded: 1972
- Head of School: John Liggett
- Grades: JK–12
- Language: English
- Area: 100-acre (0.40 km^{2})
- Colours: Blue, gray, green and red
- Team name: CDS Cyclone
- Accreditation: Canadian Accredited Independent Schools
- Tuition: $33,700 + $1,000 capital building fund
- Website: www.cds.on.ca

The Country Day School (CDS) is an independent, non-profit, preparatory, co-educational day school in King City, Ontario, Canada. It was founded in 1972.

CDS is a member of Canadian Accredited Independent Schools (CAIS) and the Conference of Independent Schools of Ontario (CIS Ontario). Its Head of School is John Liggett.

== Overview ==
Serving male and female students from junior kindergarten to grade 12, it has set a maximum class size of 24 students with an average of 17 students per. Each student is subject to an entrance assessment: an informal process for young children or the more formal Canadian Achievement Test for older students.

The school is divided into a Junior School (JK-6), Middle School (7–8), and Senior School (9–12). CDS competes in CIS Athletic Association (CISAA) sports each term, particularly soccer, rugby, track and field, hockey, basketball, softball, baseball, volleyball, and cross country.

Being a private, independent school CDS charges a yearly fee $33,700 (in addition to $1,000 capital building fund) for students in grades JK-12.

== Campus ==
The school is situated on over 100 acres and has three full-sized gymnasiums, an athletics track, two softball diamonds, five full-size fields, and three smaller fields. One full-size field is synthetic turf, and one of the small fields has synthetic turf and is covered with a dome for all-season access. The school also has a performing arts centre with a 350-seat theatre, practice rooms, and an atrium.

In February 2016, it opened a 4,700 square metres (51,000 sq ft) two-storey building for the senior school and administration offices which was funded by $10 million raised through the "Making Connections" campaign. It contains nine classrooms, administration offices, a dining hall, and learning centres.

== Notable alumni ==
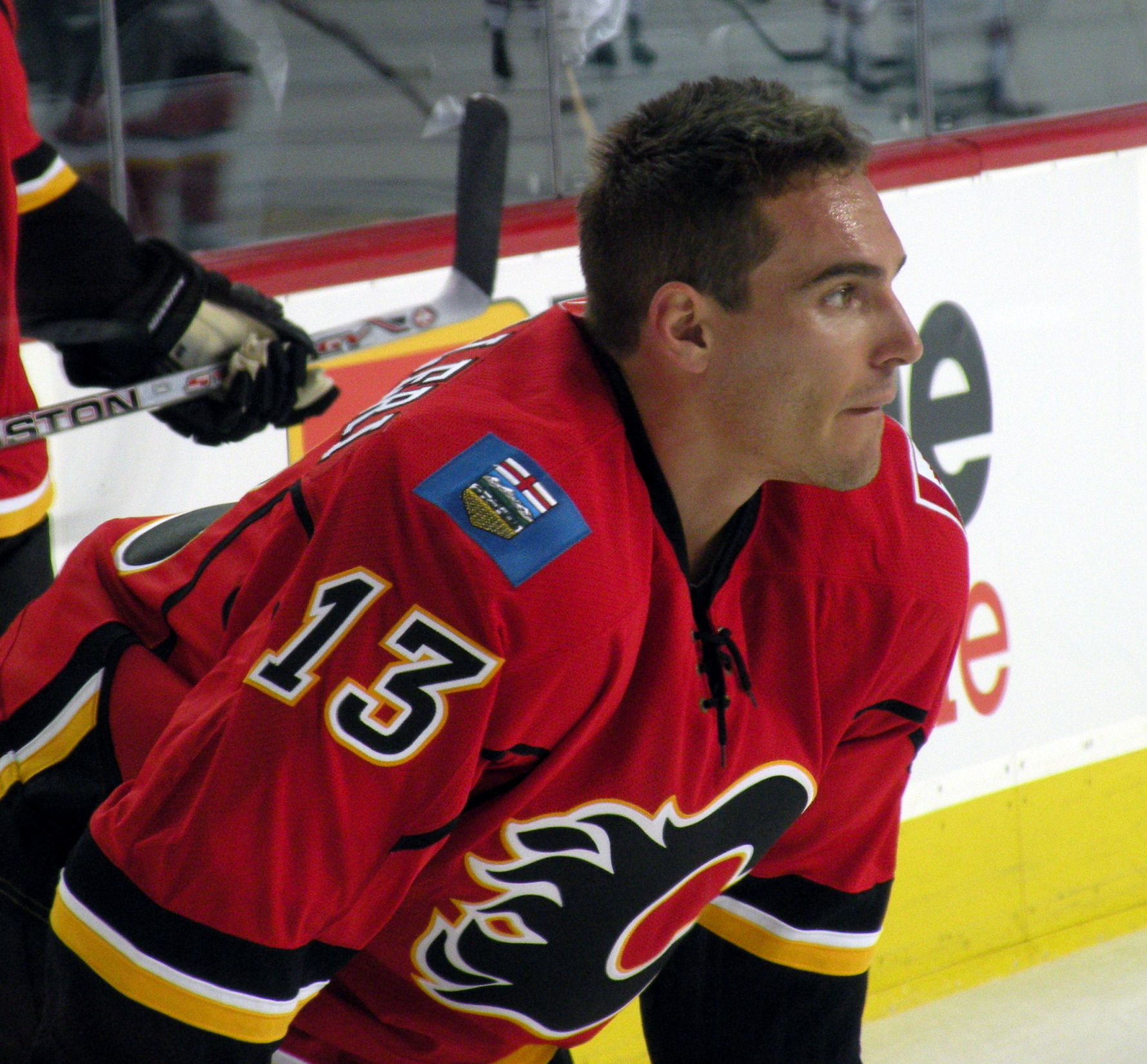
Mike Cammalleri

- Mike Cammalleri, NHL hockey player
- Elvis Stojko, figure skater
- Adriana Leon, soccer player
- Alexandra Paul, figure skater
- Victor Mete, NHL hockey player
- Jakob Chychrun, NHL hockey player
- Barclay Goodrow, NHL hockey player
- JP Saxe, Musician
- McKinley Hunt, Rugby Player
