= 2023 CONCACAF Women's U-20 Championship qualification =

2023 CONCACAF Women's U-20 Championship Qualifiers
Tournament details
- Host countries: Curaçao; Dominican Republic; Nicaragua
- Dates: 14 – 23 April 2023
- Teams: 32 (from 1 confederation)

Tournament statistics
- Matches played: 44
- Goals scored: 263 (5.98 per match)
- Top scorer(s): (Canada) Olivia Smith (Guyana) Se-Hanna Mars (8 goals each)

The 2023 CONCACAF Women's U-20 Championship qualification competition, was a women's football tournament that was contested by the under-20 women's national teams of the member associations of CONCACAF to decide the participating teams of the 2023 CONCACAF Women's U-20 Championship. The qualifying matches were scheduled to take place between 14 and 23 April 2023. A total of six teams in the qualifying competition advanced to the final tournament, joining United States and Mexico, who received byes as the top-ranked teams. The 2023 CONCACAF Women's U-20 Championship will serve as the CONCACAF qualifiers for the 2024 FIFA U-20 Women's World Cup.

== Teams ==
A record number of 32 CONCACAF member associations entered the qualifying competition, (excluding the United States and Mexico, who have qualified automatically for the final tournament as the top two CONCACAF teams in the CONCACAF Women's U-20 Rankings of August 2022).

| Automatic qualifiers | Teams entering qualification |
|---|---|
| **Mexico**; **United States** | Anguilla; Antigua and Barbuda; Bahamas; Belize; Bermuda; Canada; Cayman Islands; Costa Rica; Cuba; Curaçao; Dominica; Dominican Republic; El Salvador; French Guiana (Note: Not a member of FIFA, ineligible for World Cup); Grenada; Guadeloupe; Guatemala; Guyana; Haiti; Honduras; Jamaica; Martinique; Nicaragua; Panama; Puerto Rico; Saint Kitts and Nevis; Saint Lucia; Saint Vincent and the Grenadines; Sint Maarten; Suriname; Trinidad and Tobago; U.S. Virgin Islands |

Notes

- Teams in **bold** qualified for the final tournament.

Did not enter
- Aruba
- Barbados
- British Virgin Islands
- Bonaire
- Montserrat
- Saint Martin
- Turks and Caicos Islands

== Venues ==
On 17 February 2023, CONCACAF announced the tournament would be hosted in Curaçao, the Dominican Republic, and Nicaragua, with Curaçao hosting Groups B and D and the Dominican Republic hosting groups A and C, and Nicaragua hosting Groups E and F.

| 2023 CONCACAF Women's U-20 Championship qualification is located in North America | Willemstad | San Cristóbal | Santo Domingo | Managua |
|---|---|---|---|---|
| 2023 CONCACAF Women's U-20 Championship qualification is located in North America | Rignaal Jean Francisca Stadium | Estadio Panamericano | Félix Sánchez Olympic Stadium | Nicaragua National Football Stadium |
| 2023 CONCACAF Women's U-20 Championship qualification is located in North America | Capacity: 3,000 | Capacity: 2,800 | Capacity: 27,000 | Capacity: 15,000 |

== Format ==
The qualifying competition was held from 14 to 23 April 2023 across three countries namely Curaçao, the Dominican Republic, and Nicaragua. Teams were drawn into six groups (two groups of six teams and four groups of five teams each), and to play in a single round-robin format. The six group winners will advance to the final tournament.

=== Tiebreakers ===
The ranking of teams in each group is determined as follows (Regulations Article 12.4):

1. Points obtained in all group matches (three points for a win, one for a draw, zero for a loss);
2. Goal difference in all group matches;
3. Number of goals scored in all group matches;
4. Points obtained in the matches played between the teams in question;
5. Goal difference in the matches played between the teams in question;
6. Number of goals scored in the matches played between the teams in question;
7. Fair play points in all group matches (only one deduction could be applied to a player in a single match):
  - Yellow card: −1 points;
  - Indirect red card (second yellow card): −3 points;
  - Direct red card: −4 points;
  - Yellow card and direct red card: −5 points;
8. Drawing of lots.

== Draw ==
The qualification draw took place on 16 February 2023, 11:00 EDT, in Miami, Florida, United States. The 32 teams were seeded based on the CONCACAF U-20 Women's Rankings of August 2022 (in parentheses). In the draw, teams were drawn from each pot and placed in order from groups A to F. The position teams were drawn into was based on their pot: pot 1 teams were drawn into position 1, pot 2 teams into position 2, pot 3 teams into position 3, pot 4 teams into position 4 pot 5 teams into position 5/6.

| Pot 1 | Pot 2 | Pot 3 | Pot 4 | Pot 5 |
|---|---|---|---|---|
| Canada (3); Haiti (4); Costa Rica (5); Jamaica (6); Puerto Rico (7); Dominican Republic (8) | Trinidad and Tobago (9); El Salvador (10); Guatemala (11); Guyana (12); Panama (13); Honduras (14) | Saint Kitts and Nevis (15); Bermuda (16); Nicaragua (17); Cuba (18); Cayman Islands (19); Suriname (20) | Saint Lucia (21); Curaçao (22); Grenada (23); Anguilla (24); Antigua and Barbuda (25); Saint Vincent and the Grenadines (26) | Belize (27); Bahamas (28); Dominica (29); U.S. Virgin Islands (30); French Guiana (NR); Guadeloupe (NR); Martinique (NR); Sint Maarten (NR) |

Notes

- NR: Not ranked

== Groups ==
=== Group A ===
| Pos | Team | Pld | W | D | L | GF | GA | GD | Pts | Qualification |
|---|---|---|---|---|---|---|---|---|---|---|
| 1 | Canada | 4 | 4 | 0 | 0 | 40 | 1 | +39 | 12 | Qualification to Final tournament |
| 2 | El Salvador | 4 | 3 | 0 | 1 | 16 | 11 | +5 | 9 | |
| 3 | Cuba | 4 | 2 | 0 | 2 | 6 | 6 | 0 | 6 | |
| 4 | Martinique | 4 | 0 | 1 | 3 | 2 | 21 | −19 | 1 | |
| 5 | Saint Vincent and the Grenadines | 4 | 0 | 1 | 3 | 1 | 26 | −25 | 1 | |
| 6 | U.S. Virgin Islands | 0 | 0 | 0 | 0 | 0 | 0 | 0 | 0 | Withdrew |

Source: CONCACAF
Rules for classification: Tiebreakers
14 April 2023
15:00

| El Salvador | 2–1 | Cuba |
|---|---|---|
| López 5'; Angel 85' (pen.) | Report | Vega 88' |

Estadio Panamericano, San Cristóbal
Referee: Francia Gonzalez (Mexico)
14 April 2023
18:00

| Canada | 15–0 | Martinique |
|---|---|---|
| Mouratidis 4'; Jourde 6'; Ottey 11'; Hernandez-Gray 21'; Markesini 35'; Maalouf 37'; Perrault 40'; Chukwu 45', 54'; Smith 50', 65', 85'; Rose 64', 68', 76' (pen.) | Report |

Estadio Panamericano, San Cristóbal
Attendance: 78
Referee: Astrid Gramajo (Guatemala)

16 April 2023
15:00

| Martinique | 1–3 | El Salvador |
|---|---|---|
| Dincuff 16' (pen.) | Report | López 7'; Velásquez 44'; Villatoro 62' |

Estadio Panamericano, San Cristóbal
Referee: Diana Perez (Mexico)
16 April 2023
18:00

| Saint Vincent and the Grenadines | 0–12 | Canada |
|---|---|---|
| | Report | Smith 20' (pen.), 25' (pen.), 45+1'; Rose 31'; Briggs 38'; Collin 55'; Maalouf 56', 89'; Chukwu 70'; Hernandez-Gray 72'; McBride 81', 87' |

Estadio Panamericano, San Cristóbal
Referee: Shandor Wilkinson (Saint Kitts and Nevis)

18 April 2023
15:00

| El Salvador | 10–0 | Saint Vincent and the Grenadines |
|---|---|---|
| Sánchez 17', 75'; Benitez 30'; Johannes 36', 45', 80'; López 64', 67', 81'; Angel 85' | Report |

Estadio Panamericano, San Cristóbal
Referee: Astrid Gramajo (Guatemala)
18 April 2023
18:00

| Martinique | 0–2 | Cuba |
|---|---|---|
| | Report | Franco 56'; Ledesma 72' (pen.) |

Estadio Panamericano, San Cristóbal

20 April 2023
15:00

| Saint Vincent and the Grenadines | 1–1 | Martinique |
|---|---|---|
| Hooper 15' | Report | Peria 53' |

Estadio Panamericano, San Cristóbal
Referee: Smeedly Saint Jean (Haiti)
20 April 2023
18:00

| Cuba | 0–4 | Canada |
|---|---|---|
| | Report | Jourde 12', 44'; Briggs 67', 81' |

Estadio Panamericano, San Cristóbal
Referee: Kedeen Foster (Cayman Islands)

22 April 2023
15:00

| Cuba | 3–0 | Saint Vincent and the Grenadines |
|---|---|---|
| Guillen 36'; Vega 77'; Blanco 90' | Report |

Estadio Panamericano, San Cristóbal
Referee: Saphire Stockman (Costa Rica)
22 April 2023
18:00

| Canada | 9–1 | El Salvador |
|---|---|---|
| Jourde 8'; Smith 14', 19' (pen.); Chukwu 43', 47'; Allen 55', 73'; Briggs 85', 87' | Report | Johannes 34' |

Estadio Panamericano, San Cristóbal
Referee: Karitza Guerra (Honduras)

=== Group B ===
| Pos | Team | Pld | W | D | L | GF | GA | GD | Pts | Qualification |
|---|---|---|---|---|---|---|---|---|---|---|
| 1 | Panama | 3 | 3 | 0 | 0 | 29 | 1 | +28 | 9 | Qualification to Final tournament |
| 2 | Curaçao (H) | 3 | 2 | 0 | 1 | 16 | 5 | +11 | 6 | |
| 3 | Sint Maarten | 3 | 1 | 0 | 2 | 3 | 20 | −17 | 3 | |
| 4 | Bahamas | 3 | 0 | 0 | 3 | 1 | 23 | −22 | 0 | |
| 5 | Haiti | 0 | 0 | 0 | 0 | 0 | 0 | 0 | 0 | Withdrew |
| 6 | Saint Kitts and Nevis | 0 | 0 | 0 | 0 | 0 | 0 | 0 | 0 | Withdrew |

Source: CONCACAF
Rules for classification: Tiebreakers
(H) Hosts
14 April 2023
15:00

| Haiti | Cancelled | Bahamas |

Rignaal Jean Francisca Stadium, Willemstad
14 April 2023
18:00

| Panama | 5–1 | Curaçao |
|---|---|---|
| Hincapié 13', 40'; Salazar 34', 77'; Gross 47' | Report | Rosa 59' |

Rignaal Jean Francisca Stadium, Willemstad
Referee: Neressa Goldson (Jamaica)

16 April 2023
15:00

| Bahamas | 0–13 | Panama |
|---|---|---|
| | Report | King 3', 13', 61'; Gross 17', 19', 31'; Gil 29'; Russell 36' (o.g.); Rosas 45+1'; Hincapié 47' (pen.), 89'; Madrid 66' (pen.); Goldstein 82' |

Rignaal Jean Francisca Stadium, Willemstad
Referee: Marianela Araya (Costa Rica)
16 April 2023
18:00

| Sint Maarten | Cancelled | Haiti |

Rignaal Jean Francisca Stadium, Willemstad

18 April 2023
15:00

| Panama | 11–0 | Sint Maarten |
|---|---|---|
| Rivera 6', 50'; Quintero 8', 22', 67', 84'; Espino 19'; Gil 36'; Salazar 55'; King 75', 82' | Report |

Rignaal Jean Francisca Stadium, Willemstad
Referee: Neressa Goldson (Jamaica)
18 April 2023
18:00

| Bahamas | 0–7 | Curaçao |
|---|---|---|
| | Report | Rosa 13', 35'; Keller 17', 34'; Leito 41', 59'; Nisa 79' |

Rignaal Jean Francisca Stadium, Willemstad

20 April 2023
15:00

| Sint Maarten | 3–1 | Bahamas |
|---|---|---|
| Supriana 38'; Drijvers 47'; Van De Pas 84' | Report | Williamson 53' |

Rignaal Jean Francisca Stadium, Willemstad
Referee: Danielle Chesky (United States)
20 April 2023
18:00

| Curaçao | Cancelled | Haiti |

Rignaal Jean Francisca Stadium, Willemstad

22 April 2023
15:00

| Haiti | Cancelled | Panama |

Rignaal Jean Francisca Stadium, Willemstad
22 April 2023
18:00

| Curaçao | 8–0 | Sint Maarten |
|---|---|---|
| Keller 5', 30', 49', 55', 61'; Rosa 11' (pen.); Petronilia 84', 89' | Report |

Rignaal Jean Francisca Stadium, Willemstad
Referee: Marianela Araya (Costa Rica)

=== Group C ===
| Pos | Team | Pld | W | D | L | GF | GA | GD | Pts | Qualification |
|---|---|---|---|---|---|---|---|---|---|---|
| 1 | Dominican Republic (H) | 3 | 2 | 1 | 0 | 18 | 0 | +18 | 7 | Qualification to Final tournament |
| 2 | Guyana | 3 | 2 | 1 | 0 | 16 | 0 | +16 | 7 | |
| 3 | Suriname | 3 | 1 | 0 | 2 | 2 | 9 | −7 | 3 | |
| 4 | Dominica | 3 | 0 | 0 | 3 | 0 | 27 | −27 | 0 | |
| 5 | Grenada | 0 | 0 | 0 | 0 | 0 | 0 | 0 | 0 | Withdrew |

Source: CONCACAF
Rules for classification: Tiebreakers
(H) Hosts
15 April 2023
15:00

| Guyana | 6–0 | Suriname |
|---|---|---|
| Mars 24', 47'; Johnson 40'; Lewis 55'; Banfield 61'; Trim 90' | Report |

Félix Sánchez Olympic Stadium, Santo Domingo
Referee: Kedeen Foster (Cayman Islands)
15 April 2023
18:00

| Dominican Republic | 15–0 | Dominica |
|---|---|---|
| Vargas 6', 11', 33', 44', 73', 79'; Vallecillo 7', 21', 63'; Jackson 10'; Diaz 14', 37'; Mercedes 70' (pen.); Tapia 86'; Ventura 90' | Report |

Félix Sánchez Olympic Stadium, Santo Domingo
Referee: Karitza Guerra (Honduras)

17 April 2023
15:00

| Dominica | 0–10 | Guyana |
|---|---|---|
| | Report | Trim 5', 90+2'; Mars 14', 16', 19', 31', 37', 66'; Clarke 48'; Lewis 78' |

Félix Sánchez Olympic Stadium, Santo Domingo
Referee: Saphire Stockman (Costa Rica)
17 April 2023
18:00

| Suriname | 0–3 | Dominican Republic |
|---|---|---|
| | Report | Vallecillo 63'; Ventura 82'; Mercedes 90+4' |

Félix Sánchez Olympic Stadium, Santo Domingo
Referee: Smeedly Saint Jean (Haiti)

19 April 2023
15:00

| Suriname | 2–0 | Dominica |
|---|---|---|
| Williams 19'; Loe-A-Foe 65' | Report |

Félix Sánchez Olympic Stadium, Santo Domingo
Referee: Shandor Wilkinson (Saint Kitts and Nevis)
19 April 2023
18:00

| Dominican Republic | 0–0 | Guyana |
|---|---|---|
| | Report |

Félix Sánchez Olympic Stadium, Santo Domingo
Referee: Diana Perez (Mexico)

=== Group D ===
| Pos | Team | Pld | W | D | L | GF | GA | GD | Pts | Qualification |
|---|---|---|---|---|---|---|---|---|---|---|
| 1 | Puerto Rico | 3 | 3 | 0 | 0 | 16 | 1 | +15 | 9 | Qualification to Final tournament |
| 2 | Trinidad and Tobago | 3 | 2 | 0 | 1 | 6 | 7 | −1 | 6 | |
| 3 | Guadeloupe | 3 | 1 | 0 | 2 | 5 | 8 | −3 | 3 | |
| 4 | Cayman Islands | 3 | 0 | 0 | 3 | 1 | 12 | −11 | 0 | |
| 5 | Antigua and Barbuda | 0 | 0 | 0 | 0 | 0 | 0 | 0 | 0 | Withdrew |

Source: CONCACAF
Rules for classification: Tiebreakers
15 April 2023
15:00

| Trinidad and Tobago | 3–0 | Cayman Islands |
|---|---|---|
| Martin 22', 68'; Jackson 66' | Report |

Rignaal Jean Francisca Stadium, Willemstad
Referee: Amairany Garcia (Mexico)
15 April 2023
18:00

| Puerto Rico | 5–0 | Guadeloupe |
|---|---|---|
| Garcia 12'; Colon 40'; Gonzalez 52'; Chinea 72'; Martinez 88' | Report |

Rignaal Jean Francisca Stadium, Willemstad
Referee: Merlin Vanessa Soto (Honduras)

17 April 2023
15:00

| Guadeloupe | 2–3 | Trinidad and Tobago |
|---|---|---|
| Echard 42'; Loubli 84' (pen.) | Report | Alexander 8' (pen.), 51' (pen.), 60' |

Rignaal Jean Francisca Stadium, Willemstad
Referee: Tatiana Guzman (Nicaragua)
17 April 2023
18:00

| Cayman Islands | 1–6 | Puerto Rico |
|---|---|---|
| Kehoe 45+2' | Report | Garcia 9', 45+1'; Krakower 24'; Quinones 63'; Roberts 75'; Gregoris 90+2' |

Rignaal Jean Francisca Stadium, Willemstad
Referee: Melissa Borjas Pastrana (Honduras)

19 April 2023
15:00

| Cayman Islands | 0–3 | Guadeloupe |
|---|---|---|
| | Report | Bironien 53', 90+2', 90+5' |

Rignaal Jean Francisca Stadium, Willemstad
Referee: Amairany Garcia (Mexico)
19 April 2023
18:00

| Puerto Rico | 5–0 | Trinidad and Tobago |
|---|---|---|
| Garcia 27', 82'; Colon 30', 76'; McMahon 51' | Report |

Rignaal Jean Francisca Stadium, Willemstad
Referee: Merlin Vanessa Soto (Honduras)

=== Group E ===
| Pos | Team | Pld | W | D | L | GF | GA | GD | Pts | Qualification |
|---|---|---|---|---|---|---|---|---|---|---|
| 1 | Jamaica | 3 | 3 | 0 | 0 | 10 | 0 | +10 | 9 | Qualification to Final tournament |
| 2 | Honduras | 3 | 2 | 0 | 1 | 15 | 3 | +12 | 6 | |
| 3 | Bermuda | 3 | 1 | 0 | 2 | 4 | 9 | −5 | 3 | |
| 4 | Anguilla | 3 | 0 | 0 | 3 | 1 | 18 | −17 | 0 | |
| 5 | French Guiana | 0 | 0 | 0 | 0 | 0 | 0 | 0 | 0 | Withdrew |

Source: CONCACAF
Rules for classification: Tiebreakers
14 April 2023
16:00

| Honduras | 6–1 | Bermuda |
|---|---|---|
| Henriquez 8', 34'; Sanchez 48'; Rodriguez 52'; Bu 56'; Guevara 90+1' | Report | S. Simmons 89' |

Nicaragua National Football Stadium, Managua
Referee: Crystal Sobers (Trinidad and Tobago)
14 April 2023
19:00

| Jamaica | 6–0 | Anguilla |
|---|---|---|
| Richards 1'; Wilson 15'; Powell 27'; Atkinson 29'; Seaton 43' (pen.); Amele 76' | Report |

Nicaragua National Football Stadium, Managua
Referee: Karen Hernandez (Mexico)

16 April 2023
16:00

| Honduras | 9–0 | Anguilla |
|---|---|---|
| Luna 7', 16', 19', 70'; Ramos 22'; Rodriguez 32', 48'; Calix 57' (pen.); Chicas 79' (pen.) | Report |

Nicaragua National Football Stadium, Managua
Referee: Priscila Perez (Mexico)
16 April 2023
19:00

| Bermuda | 0–2 | Jamaica |
|---|---|---|
| | Report | Buckley 48'; Richards 90+2' |

Nicaragua National Football Stadium, Managua
Referee: Alyssa Nichols (United States)

18 April 2023
16:00

| Bermuda | 3–1 | Anguilla |
|---|---|---|
| Pearman 65'; J. Simmons 80'; Easton 90+1' | Report | Wattley 17' |

Nicaragua National Football Stadium, Managua
Referee: Crystal Sobers (Trinidad and Tobago)
18 April 2023
19:00

| Jamaica | 2–0 | Honduras |
|---|---|---|
| Atkinson 2', 90+1' | Report |

Nicaragua National Football Stadium, Managua
Referee: Sandra Benitez (El Salvador)

=== Group F ===
| Pos | Team | Pld | W | D | L | GF | GA | GD | Pts | Qualification |
|---|---|---|---|---|---|---|---|---|---|---|
| 1 | Costa Rica | 4 | 4 | 0 | 0 | 26 | 2 | +24 | 12 | Qualification to Final tournament |
| 2 | Nicaragua (H) | 4 | 3 | 0 | 1 | 10 | 5 | +5 | 9 | |
| 3 | Guatemala | 4 | 2 | 0 | 2 | 10 | 5 | +5 | 6 | |
| 4 | Belize | 4 | 1 | 0 | 3 | 8 | 20 | −12 | 3 | |
| 5 | Saint Lucia | 4 | 0 | 0 | 4 | 1 | 23 | −22 | 0 | |

Source: CONCACAF
Rules for classification: Tiebreakers
(H) Hosts
15 April 2023
16:00

| Costa Rica | 13–0 | Belize |
|---|---|---|
| Scott 3', 45+2', 57'; Herrera 6', 14', 19', 32'; T. Fonseca 12', 28'; Briceño 42'; Dinarte 55'; V. Matarrita 71'; González 88' | Report |

Nicaragua National Football Stadium, Managua
Referee: Carly Shaw-MacLaren (Canada)
15 April 2023
19:00

| Guatemala | 1–3 | Nicaragua |
|---|---|---|
| Gonzalez 19' | Report | Mejia 55'; Manzanares 64'; Olayo 69' (o.g.) |

Nicaragua National Football Stadium, Managua
Referee: Sandra Benitez (El Salvador)

17 April 2023
16:00

| Belize | 0–3 | Guatemala |
|---|---|---|
| | Report | Amaya 12'; Polanco 30'; Perla 75' |

Nicaragua National Football Stadium, Managua
Referee: Annays Rosario (Puerto Rico)
17 April 2023
19:00

| Saint Lucia | 0–9 | Costa Rica |
|---|---|---|
| | Report | Herrera 5', 7', 13'; Scott 10' (pen.), 11'; Roper 43', 49'; V. Matarrita 82'; M. Matarrita 90+1' |

Nicaragua National Football Stadium, Managua
Referee: Mirian Leon (El Salvador)

19 April 2023
16:00

| Guatemala | 5–0 | Saint Lucia |
|---|---|---|
| Gonzalez 9'; Contreras 17'; Franco 60', 89'; Perla 82' | Report |

Nicaragua National Football Stadium, Managua
Referee: Priscila Perez (Mexico)
19 April 2023
19:00

| Belize | 2–3 | Nicaragua |
|---|---|---|
| Velasquez 25', 67' | Report | Garache 8'; I. Navarrete 14', 31' |

Nicaragua National Football Stadium, Managua
Referee: Karen Hernandez (Mexico)

21 April 2023
16:00

| Saint Lucia | 1–6 | Belize |
|---|---|---|
| Joseph 17' | Report | Flowers 6'; Narvaez 36'; Velasquez 54', 86'; Nunes 67'; Perez 76' |

Nicaragua National Football Stadium, Managua
Referee: Annays Rosario (Puerto Rico)
21 April 2023
19:00

| Nicaragua | 1–2 | Costa Rica |
|---|---|---|
| Munguia 71' | Report | Scott 6'; Solano 32' |

Nicaragua National Football Stadium, Managua
Referee: Carly Shaw-MacLaren (Canada)

23 April 2023
16:00

| Costa Rica | 2–1 | Guatemala |
|---|---|---|
| V. Matarrita 75'; Solano 89' | | Gonzalez 55' |

Nicaragua National Football Stadium, Managua
23 April 2023
19:00

| Nicaragua | 3–0 | Saint Lucia |
|---|---|---|
| I. Navarrete 7', 21'; Manzanares 84' |

Nicaragua National Football Stadium, Managua
Referee: Mirian Leon (El Salvador)

== Goalscorers ==
There were 263 goals scored in 44 matches, for an average of 5.98 goals per match.

8 goals

- (Canada) Olivia Smith
- (Guyana) Se-Hanna Mars

7 goals

- (Costa Rica) Alexa Herrera
- (Curaçao) Raëngelly Keller

6 goals

- (Costa Rica) Sheika Scott
- (Dominican Republic) Angelina Vargas

5 goals

- (Canada) Kayla Briggs
- (Canada) Annabelle Chukwu
- (El Salvador) Dariella López
- (Panama) Sherline King
- (Puerto Rico) Kennedy García

4 goals

- (Belize) Khalydia Velasquez
- (Canada) Florianne Jourde
- (Canada) Nyah Rose
- (Curaçao) Jeleaugh Rosa
- (Dominican Republic) Jaylen Vallecillo
- (El Salvador) Elizabeth Johannes
- (Honduras) Katherine Luna
- (Nicaragua) Ines Navarrete
- (Panama) Marisa Gross
- (Panama) Daniela Hincapié
- (Panama) Ana Quintero

3 goals

- (Canada) Rosa Maalouf
- (Costa Rica) Veronica Matarrita
- (Guadeloupe) Mymithye Bironien
- (Guatemala) Karen Gonzalez
- (Guyana) Jalade Trim
- (Honduras) Anyeli Rodriguez
- (Jamaica) Natoya Atkinson
- (Panama) Deysire Salazar
- (Puerto Rico) Enasia Colón
- (Trinidad and Tobago) J'eleisha Alexander

2 goals

- (Canada) Amanda Allen
- (Canada) Jeneva Hernandez-Gray
- (Canada) Ella McBride
- (Costa Rica) Tanisha Fonseca
- (Costa Rica) Samira Roper
- (Costa Rica) Marian Solano
- (Cuba) Sheila Vega
- (Curaçao) Shermilyene Leito
- (Curaçao) Rushaviana Petronilia
- (Dominican Republic) Ariana Diaz
- (Dominican Republic) Renata Mercedes
- (Dominican Republic) Isabella Ventura
- (El Salvador) Amy Angel
- (El Salvador) Victoria Sánchez
- (Guatemala) Flor Perla
- (Guatemala) Waleska Franco
- (Guyana) Glendy Lewis
- (Honduras) Susan Henriquez
- (Jamaica) Davia Richards
- (Nicaragua) Daniela Manzanares
- (Panama) Aaliyah Gil
- (Panama) Delineth Rivera
- (Trinidad and Tobago) Talia Martin

1 goal

- (Anguilla) Cycoiah Wattley
- (The Bahamas) Alexis Williamson
- (Belize) Shaylalee Flowers
- (Belize) Roshanny Narvaez
- (Belize) Elva Nunes
- (Belize) Kenya Perez
- (Bermuda) Azari Easton
- (Bermuda) Robin-Valana Pearman
- (Bermuda) Jahni Simmons
- (Bermuda) Sanaa Simmons
- (Canada) Jadea Collin
- (Canada) Thaea Mouratidis
- (Canada) Zoe Markesini
- (Canada) Ella Ottey
- (Canada) Jaime Perrault
- (Cayman Islands) Molly Kehoe
- (Costa Rica) Josselyn Briceño
- (Costa Rica) Dayra Dinarte
- (Costa Rica) Luciana González
- (Costa Rica) Monica Matarrita
- (Cuba) Maria Blanco
- (Cuba) Lianet Franco
- (Cuba) Maria Guillen
- (Cuba) Dalia Ledesma
- (Curaçao) Nabiellene Nisa
- (Dominican Republic) Jazmin Jackson
- (Dominican Republic) Stella Tapia
- (El Salvador) Carolina Benitez
- (El Salvador) Karoline Velásquez
- (El Salvador) Kelsey Villatoro
- (Guadeloupe) Laetitia Echard
- (Guadeloupe) Sergyna Loubli
- (Guatemala) Paula Amaya
- (Guatemala) Betzael Contreras
- (Guatemala) Dina Polanco
- (Guyana) Samantha Banfield
- (Guyana) Heike Clarke
- (Guyana) Sandra Johnson
- (Honduras) Betsy Bu
- (Honduras) Karla Calix
- (Honduras) Emelly Chicas
- (Honduras) Ariana Guevara
- (Honduras) Iveth Ramos
- (Honduras) Emory Sanchez
- (Jamaica) Sundai Amele
- (Jamaica) Shaneil Buckley
- (Jamaica) Destiny Powell
- (Jamaica) Tiny Seaton
- (Jamaica) Dannique Wilson
- (Martinique) Eden Dincuff
- (Martinique) Naya Peria
- (Nicaragua) Perla Garache
- (Nicaragua) Aryeri Mejia
- (Nicaragua) Adriana Munguia
- (Panama) Reggina Espino
- (Panama) Amanda Goldstein
- (Panama) Dayane Madrid
- (Panama) Meredith Rosas
- (Puerto Rico) Jocelyn Chinea
- (Puerto Rico) Estefanía González
- (Puerto Rico) Lisette Gregoris
- (Puerto Rico) Madison Krakower
- (Puerto Rico) Fabiola Martínez
- (Puerto Rico) Ashley McMahon
- (Puerto Rico) Payton Quiñones
- (Puerto Rico) Susana Roberts
- (Saint Lucia) Freegeanne Joseph
- (Saint Vincent and the Grenadines) Areka Hooper
- (Suriname) Damarez Williams
- (Suriname) Samanie Loe-A-Foe
- (Sint Maarten) N'syree Supriana
- (Sint Maarten) Jiarah Drijvers
- (Sint Maarten) Suze Van De Pas
- (Trinidad and Tobago) Nikita Jackson

1 own goal

- (The Bahamas) Raynia Russell (against Panama)
- (Guatemala) Ariadna Olayo (against Nicaragua)

== Qualified teams ==
The following eight teams qualified for the final tournament.

| Team | Qualified as | Qualified on | Previous appearances in CONCACAF Women's U-20 Championship^{1} |
|---|---|---|---|
| Mexico | Automatic qualifiers | 15 February 2023 | 11 (**2002**, 2004, 2006, 2008, 2010, 2012, 2014, 2015, **2018**, 2020, 2022) |
| United States | Automatic qualifiers | 15 February 2023 | 11 (**2002**, 2004, **2006**, 2008, **2010**, **2012**, **2014**, **2015**, 2018, **2020**, **2022**) |
| Canada | Group A Winners | 22 April 2023 | 9 (**2004**, 2006, **2008**, 2010, 2012, 2015, 2018, 2020, 2022) |
| Panama | Group B Winners | 18 April 2023 | 6 (2002, 2004, 2006, 2012, 2015, 2022) |
| Dominican Republic | Group C Winners | 19 April 2023 | 3 (2004, 2020, 2022) |
| Puerto Rico | Group D Winners | 19 April 2023 | 2 (2020, 2022) |
| Jamaica | Group E Winners | 18 April 2023 | 11 (2002, 2004, 2006, 2008, 2010, 2012, 2014, 2015, 2018, 2020, 2022) |
| Costa Rica | Group F Winners | 23 April 2023 | 6 (2002, 2004, 2008, 2010, 2014, 2018) |

^{1} Bold indicates champions for that year. Italic indicates hosts for that year.
