= 2022 CONCACAF Women's U-20 Championship qualification =

2022 CONCACAF Women's U-20 Championship Qualifiers
Tournament details
- Host country: Curaçao
- Dates: 13–17 September 2021
- Teams: 12 (from 1 confederation)

Tournament statistics
- Matches played: 12
- Goals scored: 52 (4.33 per match)
- Top scorer(s): (Cayman Islands) Molly Kehoe (Saint Lucia) Krysan St. Louis (5 goals each)

The 2022 CONCACAF Women's U-20 Championship Qualifiers, hosted by Curaçao, took place on 13–17 September 2021. 13 teams competed for four berths directly into the knockout stage of the 2022 CONCACAF Women's U-20 Championship final tournament.

== Teams ==
The 41 CONCACAF teams were ranked based on the CONCACAF Women's Under-20 Ranking as of 31 March 2020, and 28 entered the competition for the 2022 CONCACAF Women's U-20 Championship final tournament. The highest-ranked 16 entrants advanced directly to the group stage of the final tournament, while the other 12 entrants participated in qualifying. The four group winners in qualifying advance directly into the knockout stage of the final tournament.

Exempt from Qualifiers (16 teams)
Rank	Team	Points
1	United States	5,624
2	Mexico	4,863
3	Canada	3,397
4	Haiti	3,001
5	Trinidad and Tobago	2,311
6	Jamaica	2,300
8	Dominican Republic	1,457
9	Honduras	1,211
10	Guyana	1,028
11	Guatemala	977
12	El Salvador	894
13	Puerto Rico	879
14	Panama	867
15	Cuba	785
16	Nicaragua	733
17	Saint Kitts and Nevis	648

Participating in Qualifiers (12 teams)
Rank	Team	Points
18	Bermuda	631
19	Cayman Islands	574
20	Grenada	561
21	Saint Lucia	428
22	Anguilla	370
24	Antigua and Barbuda	307
25	Suriname	257
26	Saint Vincent and the Grenadines	252
27	Curaçao	219
29	Belize	92
33	Bahamas	0
41	U.S. Virgin Islands	0

Did not enter (13 teams)
Rank	Team	Points
7	Costa Rica (Note: Already qualified for the 2022 FIFA U-20 Women's World Cup as host.)	1,516
23	Barbados	322
28	Dominica	125
30	Bonaire (Note: Non-FIFA members and thus ineligible to play in World Cup.)	33
31	British Virgin Islands	15
32	Aruba	11
34	French Guiana	0
35	Guadeloupe	0
36	Martinique	0
37	Montserrat	0
38	Sint Maarten	0
39	Saint Martin	0
40	Turks and Caicos Islands	0

== Draw ==
The draw for the Qualifiers took place on 24 June 2021, at the CONCACAF headquarters in Miami. The 13 entrants were drawn into one group of four and three groups of three. Dominica (drawn into Group A) and Martinique (drawn into Group B) withdrew before the start of the tournament. The Bahamas later replaced Martinique in Group B.

Based on the CONCACAF Women's Under-20 Ranking as of 31 March 2020, the 13 teams were distributed into three pots:

Pot 1	Pot 2	Pot 3
Bermuda; Cayman Islands; Grenada; Saint Lucia	Anguilla; Antigua and Barbuda; Suriname; Saint Vincent and the Grenadines	Curaçao; ~~Dominica~~ (W); Belize; ~~Martinique~~ (W); U.S. Virgin Islands

- (W): Withdrew after draw

== Qualifying stage ==
The winners each group will advance to the knockout stage of the final tournament.

Tiebreakers

The ranking of teams in each group is determined as follows (Regulations Article 12.4):

1. Points obtained in all group matches (three points for a win, one for a draw, zero for a loss);
2. Goal difference in all group matches;
3. Number of goals scored in all group matches;
4. Points obtained in the matches played between the teams in question;
5. Goal difference in the matches played between the teams in question;
6. Number of goals scored in the matches played between the teams in question;
7. Fair play points in all group matches (only one deduction could be applied to a player in a single match):
  - Yellow card: −1 points;
  - Indirect red card (second yellow card): −3 points;
  - Direct red card: −4 points;
  - Yellow card and direct red card: −5 points;
8. Drawing of lots.

=== Group A ===
Pos	Team	Pld	W	D	L	GF	GA	GD	Pts	Qualification
1	Bermuda	2	2	0	0	9	0	+9	6	Knockout stage
2	Saint Vincent and the Grenadines	2	0	1	1	1	5	−4	1	
3	U.S. Virgin Islands	2	0	1	1	1	6	−5	1	

Source: CONCACAF
Rules for classification: Tiebreakers
14 September 2021
18:30

U.S. Virgin Islands	0–5	Bermuda
	Report	Jahn. Simmons 13', 90+4'; Bean 18', 21'; Masters 20'

Ergilio Hato Stadium, Willemstad

16 September 2021
18:30

Saint Vincent and the Grenadines	1–1	U.S. Virgin Islands
Creese 34'	Report	Weyland 3'

Ergilio Hato Stadium, Willemstad

18 September 2021
18:30

Bermuda	4–0	Saint Vincent and the Grenadines
Jahn. Simmons 24', 41'; Cabral 53'; Bean 75'	Report

Ergilio Hato Stadium, Willemstad

=== Group B ===
Pos	Team	Pld	W	D	L	GF	GA	GD	Pts	Qualification
1	Cayman Islands	2	2	0	0	5	0	+5	6	Knockout stage
2	Bahamas	2	1	0	1	1	2	−1	3	
3	Anguilla	2	0	0	2	0	4	−4	0	

Source: CONCACAF
Rules for classification: Tiebreakers
14 September 2021
03:00

Bahamas	0–2	Cayman Islands
	Report	Kehoe 45', 70'

Ergilio Hato Stadium, Willemstad

16 September 2021
03:00

Anguilla	0–1	Bahamas
	Report	Edey 8'

Ergilio Hato Stadium, Willemstad

18 September 2021
03:00

Cayman Islands	3–0	Anguilla
Kehoe	Report

Ergilio Hato Stadium, Willemstad

=== Group C ===
Pos	Team	Pld	W	D	L	GF	GA	GD	Pts	Qualification
1	Curaçao	2	2	0	0	6	2	+4	6	Knockout stage
2	Saint Lucia	2	1	0	1	10	5	+5	3	
3	Antigua and Barbuda	2	0	0	2	0	9	−9	0	

Source: CONCACAF
Rules for classification: Tiebreakers
14 September 2021
03:00

Curaçao	5–2	Saint Lucia
Hansen 4', 16'; Rosa 28', 37'; Alexandre 30'	Report	Louis 53'; Shepherd 90+4'

FFK Stadium, Willemstad

16 September 2021
03:00

Antigua and Barbuda	0–1	Curaçao
	Report	Rosa 34'

FFK Stadium, Willemstad

18 September 2021
03:00

Saint Lucia	8–0	Antigua and Barbuda
St. Louis 2', 53', 54', 68', 76'; Louis 20'; Solomon 59'; Regis 80'	Report

FFK Stadium, Willemstad

=== Group D ===
Pos	Team	Pld	W	D	L	GF	GA	GD	Pts	Qualification
1	Suriname	2	2	0	0	8	4	+4	6	Knockout stage
2	Belize	2	1	0	1	8	4	+4	3	
3	Grenada	2	0	0	2	3	11	−8	0	

Source: CONCACAF
Rules for classification: Tiebreakers
14 September 2021
00:30

Grenada	2–5	Suriname
Bubb 9'; Johnson 59'	Report	Slijngard 16'; Loe-a-foe 32'; Gallant 40', 57'; Chin See Chong 44'

FFK Stadium, Willemstad

16 September 2021
00:30

Suriname	3–2	Belize
Gallant 8', 55'; Thomas 66' (o.g.)	Report	Velasquez 16', 41'

FFK Stadium, Willemstad

18 September 2021
00:30

Belize	6–1	Grenada
Velasquez 4'; Terry 22', 43'; Casimiro 25'; Sylvester 61' (o.g.); Blanco 80'	Report	Phillip 81'

FFK Stadium, Willemstad

== Goalscorers ==
There were 52 goals scored in 12 matches, for an average of 4.33 goals per match.

5 goals

- (Cayman Islands) Molly Kehoe
- (Saint Lucia) Krysan St. Louis

4 goals

- (Bermuda) Jahni Simmons

3 goals

- (Belize) Khalydia Velasquez
- (Bermuda) Katherine Bean
- (Curaçao) Sadeyah Rosa
- (Suriname) Saveira Gallant

2 goals

- (Belize) Alisha Terry
- (Curaçao) Taisha Hansen
- (Saint Lucia) Arnika Louis
- (Suriname) Cady Chin See Chong

1 goal

- (The Bahamas) Janeka Edey
- (Belize) Anahie Blanco
- (Belize) Shendrah Casimiro
- (Bermuda) Emily Cabral
- (Bermuda) Jaden Masters
- (Curaçao) Queenjelly Alexandre
- (Grenada) Ronniellia Bubb
- (Grenada) Shaniah Johnson
- (Grenada) Shonika Phillip
- (Saint Lucia) Faith Regis
- (Saint Lucia) Cassandra Shepherd
- (Saint Lucia) Kylah Solomon
- (Saint Vincent and the Grenadines) Denel Creese
- (Suriname) Samanie Loe-a-foe
- (Suriname) Dareesha Slijngard
- (United States Virgin Islands) Tania Weyland

1 own goal

- (Belize) Shanell Thomas (against Suriname)
- (Grenada) Erin Sylvester (against Belize)
