= 2022 CONCACAF Women's U-20 Championship =

2022 women's youth football tournament in North and Central America and the Caribbean

Tournament details
- Host country: Dominican Republic
- Dates: 25 February – 12 March
- Teams: 20 (from 1 confederation)
- Venues: 2 (in 2 host cities)

Final positions
- Champions: United States (7th title)
- Runners-up: Mexico
- Third place: Canada
- Fourth place: Puerto Rico

Tournament statistics
- Matches played: 40
- Goals scored: 184 (4.6 per match)
- Top scorer(s): (United States) Michelle Cooper (8 goals)
- Best player: (United States) Michelle Cooper
- Best goalkeeper: (Canada) Anna Karpenko
- Fair play award: Mexico

The 2022 CONCACAF Women's U-20 Championship was the 11th edition of the CONCACAF Women's U-20 Championship, the biennial international youth football championship organised by CONCACAF for the women's under-20 national teams of the North, Central American and Caribbean region. Same as previous edition, the tournament featured 20 teams and was held in the Dominican Republic, between 25 February and 12 March 2022.

The top three teams of the tournament qualified for the 2022 FIFA U-20 Women's World Cup and joined host nation Costa Rica as the CONCACAF representatives.

== Qualification ==
The 41 CONCACAF teams were ranked based on the CONCACAF Women's Under-20 Ranking as of 31 March 2020, and 28 entered the competition for the 2022 CONCACAF Women's U-20 Championship final tournament. The highest-ranked 16 entrants advanced directly to the group stage of the final tournament, while the other 12 entrants participated in qualifying. The four group winners in qualifying advance directly into the knockout stage of the final tournament.

Costa Rica will host the 2022 FIFA U-20 Women's World Cup and, therefore, is exempt from participating in the tournament. Saint Kitts and Nevis, the 17th best ranked CONCACAF Women's Under-20, will take their place in the group stage and, therefore, were exempt from participating in the 2022 CONCACAF Women's U-20 Championship Qualifiers.

| Round | Team | Qualification | Appearance | Previous best performance | Previous FIFA U-20 Women's World Cup appearances |
|---|---|---|---|---|---|
| Group stage | United States (title holders) | 1st ranked entrant | 11th | Champions (2006, 2010, 2012, 2014, 2015, 2020) | 9 |
| Group stage | Mexico | 2nd ranked entrant | 11th | Champions (2018) | 8 |
| Group stage | Canada | 3rd ranked entrant | 9th | Champions (2004, 2008) | 7 |
| Group stage | Haiti | 4th ranked entrant | 6th | Third place (2018) | 1 |
| Group stage | Trinidad and Tobago | 5th ranked entrant | 10th | Fourth place (2014) | 0 |
| Group stage | Jamaica | 6th ranked entrant | 11th | Fourth place (2006) | 0 |
| Group stage | Dominican Republic (hosts) | 8th ranked entrant | 3rd | Semi-finals (2020) | 0 |
| Group stage | Honduras | 9th ranked entrant | 4th | Fourth place (2015) | 0 |
| Group stage | Guyana | 10th ranked entrant | 2nd | Quarter-finals (2020) | 0 |
| Group stage | Guatemala | 11th ranked entrant | 5th | Group stage (2010, 2012, 2014, 2020) | 0 |
| Group stage | El Salvador | 12th ranked entrant | 3rd | Round of 16 (2020) | 0 |
| Group stage | Puerto Rico | 13th ranked entrant | 2nd | Round of 16 (2020) | 0 |
| Group stage | Panama | 14th ranked entrant | 6th | Fourth place (2012) | 0 |
| Group stage | Cuba | 15th ranked entrant | 5th | Round of 16 (2020) | 0 |
| Group stage | Nicaragua | 16th ranked entrant | 4th | Group stage (2008, 2018, 2020) | 0 |
| Group stage | Saint Kitts and Nevis | 17th ranked entrant | 2nd | Group stage (2020) | 0 |
| Knockout stage | Bermuda | Qualifying Group A winner | 2nd | Round of 16 (2020) | 0 |
| Knockout stage | Cayman Islands | Qualifying Group B winner | 3rd | Round of 16 (2020) | 0 |
| Knockout stage | Curaçao | Qualifying Group C winner | 1st | Debut | 0 |
| Knockout stage | Suriname | Qualifying Group D winner | 3rd | Group stage (2002, 2006) | 0 |

== Venues ==
| 2022 CONCACAF Women's U-20 Championship is located in the Dominican Republic | Santo Domingo | San Cristóbal |
|---|---|---|
| 2022 CONCACAF Women's U-20 Championship is located in the Dominican Republic | Estadio Olímpico Félix Sánchez | Estadio Panamericano |
| 2022 CONCACAF Women's U-20 Championship is located in the Dominican Republic | Capacity: 27,000 | Capacity: 2,800 |

== Draw ==
The draw of the tournament was held on 15 November 2021, 11:00 AST (UTC−4), at the CONCACAF Headquarters in Miami, Florida. The 16 teams which entered the group stage were drawn into four groups of four teams. Based on the CONCACAF Women's Under-20 Ranking, the 16 teams were distributed into four pots, with teams in Pot 1 assigned to each group prior to the draw, as follows:

| Pot 1 | Pot 2 | Pot 3 | Pot 4 |
|---|---|---|---|
| United States (Group E); Mexico (Group F); Canada (Group G); Haiti (Group H) | Trinidad and Tobago; Jamaica; Dominican Republic; Honduras | Guyana; Guatemala; El Salvador; Puerto Rico | Panama; Cuba; Nicaragua; Saint Kitts and Nevis |

== Squads ==
Players born on or after 1 January 2002 are eligible to compete. Each team must register a squad of 20 players, two of whom must be goalkeepers.

== Match officials ==
CONCACAF announced the appointment of the match officials on February 11, 2022.

Referees

- (Canada) Carly Shaw-MacLaren
- (Costa Rica) Marianela Araya Cruz
- (Guatemala) Astrid Gramajo
- (Honduras) Melissa Borjas
- (Jamaica) Odette Hamilton
- (Mexico) Katia García
- (Mexico) Francia González
- (Mexico) Diana Pérez
- (Mexico) Priscilla Pérez
- (Nicaragua) Tatiana Guzmán
- (El Salvador) Sandra Benítez
- (El Salvador) Mirian León
- (Trinidad and Tobago) Crystal Sobers
- (United States) Katja Koroleva
- (United States) Tori Penso
- (United States) Natalie Simon

Assistants referees

- (The Bahamas) Krystal Evans
- (Bermuda) Natasha Trott
- (Canada) Chantal Boudreau
- (Cuba) Ivette Santiago Rodríguez
- (Dominican Republic) Santa Medina
- (Guatemala) Iris Vail
- (Honduras) Lourdes Noriega
- (Honduras) Shirley Perelló
- (Jamaica) Princess Brown
- (Jamaica) Jassett Kerr
- (Jamaica) Stephanie-Dale Yee Sing
- (Mexico) Yudilia Briones
- (Mexico) Enedina Caudillo
- (Mexico) Karen Díaz
- (Mexico) Mayra Mora
- (Mexico) Sandra Ramírez
- (El Salvador) Lidia Ayala
- (Suriname) Mijensa Rensch
- (Trinidad and Tobago) Carissa Douglas-Jacobs
- (United States) Felisha Marsical
- (United States) Brooke Mayo
- (United States) Meghan Mullen
- (United States) Kathryn Nesbitt

Video assistant referees

- (Cayman Islands) Benjamin Whitty
- (Costa Rica) Ricardo Montero
- (Costa Rica) Bejamín Pineda
- (Honduras) Said Martínez
- (Mexico) Adonai Escobedo
- (Mexico) Eduardo Galván
- (El Salvador) Ismael Cornejo
- (United States) Allen Chapman
- (United States) Tim Ford

== Group stage ==
The top three teams in each group advance to the round of 16, where they are joined by the four teams advancing from the 2022 CONCACAF Women's U-20 Championship Qualifiers.

Tiebreakers

The ranking of teams in each group is determined as follows (Regulations Article 12.8):

1. Points obtained in all group matches (three points for a win, one for a draw, zero for a loss).
2. Goal difference in all group matches.
3. Number of goals scored in all group matches.
4. Points obtained in the matches played between the teams in question.
5. Goal difference in the matches played between the teams in question.
6. Number of goals scored in the matches played between the teams in question.
7. Fair play points in all group matches (only one deduction can be applied to a player in a single match):
  - Yellow card: −1 point
  - Indirect red card (second yellow card): −3 points
  - Direct red card: −4 points
  - Yellow card and direct red card: −5 points
8. Drawing of lots.

All times are local, AST (UTC−4).

=== Group E ===
| Pos | Team | Pld | W | D | L | GF | GA | GD | Pts | Qualification |
|---|---|---|---|---|---|---|---|---|---|---|
| 1 | United States | 3 | 3 | 0 | 0 | 20 | 0 | +20 | 9 | Knockout stage |
| 2 | Puerto Rico | 3 | 2 | 0 | 1 | 4 | 8 | −4 | 6 | Knockout stage |
| 3 | Dominican Republic (H) | 3 | 1 | 0 | 2 | 4 | 11 | −7 | 3 | Knockout stage |
| 4 | Nicaragua | 3 | 0 | 0 | 3 | 1 | 10 | −9 | 0 | |

Source: CONCACAF
Rules for classification: Group stage tiebreakers
(H) Hosts
25 February 2022
16:00

| United States | 6–0 | Nicaragua |
|---|---|---|
| Moultrie 2'; Cooper 7'; Jackson 17'; Kitahata 51', 64'; McConnell 87' | Report |

Estadio Olímpico Félix Sánchez, Santo Domingo
Referee: Carly Shaw-MacLaren (Canada)
25 February 2022
19:00

| Dominican Republic | 1–3 | Puerto Rico |
|---|---|---|
| Marte 43' | Report | Hart 12'; Nieves 45+1'; Garner 68' |

Estadio Olímpico Félix Sánchez, Santo Domingo
Referee: Crystal Sobers (Trinidad & Tobago)

27 February 2022
16:00

| Puerto Rico | 0–7 | United States |
|---|---|---|
| | Report | Patterson 8', 11', 24', 45+4'; Missimo 58'; Mason 80'; Kitahata 83' |

Estadio Olímpico Félix Sánchez, Santo Domingo
Referee: Astrid Gramajo (Guatemala)
27 February 2022
19:00

| Nicaragua | 1–3 | Dominican Republic |
|---|---|---|
| Navarrete 87' | Report | Vargas 45+1', 64'; A. Díaz 69' |

Estadio Olímpico Félix Sánchez, Santo Domingo
Referee: Sandra Benítez (El Salvador)

1 March 2022
16:00

| Puerto Rico | 1–0 | Nicaragua |
|---|---|---|
| Hart 66' | Report |

Estadio Olímpico Félix Sánchez, Santo Domingo
Referee: Mirian León (El Salvador)
1 March 2022
19:00

| United States | 7–0 | Dominican Republic |
|---|---|---|
| Kitahata 33'; Missimo 35', 41'; Marte 47' (o.g.); DellaPeruta 58'; Colton 79'; Jackson 90+2' | Report |

Estadio Olímpico Félix Sánchez, Santo Domingo
Referee: Marianela Araya Cruz (Costa Rica)

=== Group F ===
| Pos | Team | Pld | W | D | L | GF | GA | GD | Pts | Qualification |
|---|---|---|---|---|---|---|---|---|---|---|
| 1 | Mexico | 3 | 3 | 0 | 0 | 13 | 0 | +13 | 9 | Knockout stage |
| 2 | Panama | 3 | 1 | 1 | 1 | 6 | 4 | +2 | 4 | Knockout stage |
| 3 | Guyana | 3 | 1 | 0 | 2 | 2 | 10 | −8 | 3 | Knockout stage |
| 4 | Honduras | 3 | 0 | 1 | 2 | 1 | 8 | −7 | 1 | |

Source: CONCACAF
Rules for classification: Group stage tiebreakers
26 February 2022
16:00

| Honduras | 0–2 | Guyana |
|---|---|---|
| | Report | Banfield 45+4'; Narine 90+1' |

Estadio Olímpico Félix Sánchez, Santo Domingo
Referee: Natalie Simon (United States)
26 February 2022
20:00

| Mexico | 3–0 | Panama |
|---|---|---|
| Avilez 48'; Villanueva 63' (pen.); Chavero 81' | Report |

Estadio Olímpico Félix Sánchez, Santo Domingo
Referee: Marianela Araya (Costa Rica)

28 February 2022
16:00

| Panama | 1–1 | Honduras |
|---|---|---|
| Cedeño 58' | Report | Arias 62' |

Estadio Olímpico Félix Sánchez, Santo Domingo
Referee: Carly Shaw-MacLaren (Canada)
28 February 2022
19:00

| Guyana | 0–5 | Mexico |
|---|---|---|
| | Report | Chavero 10' (pen.); Maldonado 28', 56'; T. Flores 37'; Avilez 78' |

Estadio Olímpico Félix Sánchez, Santo Domingo
Referee: Natalie Simon (United States)

2 March 2022
16:00

| Guyana | 0–5 | Panama |
|---|---|---|
| | Report | H. Holder 2' (o.g.); Jaén 8'; Camarena 40', 61'; Vásquez 54' |

Estadio Olímpico Félix Sánchez, Santo Domingo
Referee: Sandra Benítez (El Salvador)
2 March 2022
19:00

| Mexico | 5–0 | Honduras |
|---|---|---|
| Avilez 4', 11'; Villanueva 23'; Maldonado 64'; Mauleón 66' | Report |

Estadio Olímpico Félix Sánchez, Santo Domingo
Referee: Odette Hamilton (Jamaica)

=== Group G ===
| Pos | Team | Pld | W | D | L | GF | GA | GD | Pts | Qualification |
|---|---|---|---|---|---|---|---|---|---|---|
| 1 | Canada | 3 | 3 | 0 | 0 | 16 | 0 | +16 | 9 | Knockout stage |
| 2 | El Salvador | 3 | 2 | 0 | 1 | 8 | 4 | +4 | 6 | Knockout stage |
| 3 | Saint Kitts and Nevis | 3 | 1 | 0 | 2 | 7 | 14 | −7 | 3 | Knockout stage |
| 4 | Trinidad and Tobago | 3 | 0 | 0 | 3 | 2 | 15 | −13 | 0 | |

Source: CONCACAF
Rules for classification: Group stage tiebreakers
25 February 2022
16:00

| Trinidad and Tobago | 0–3 | El Salvador |
|---|---|---|
| | Report | Calderón 23'; Uribe 43'; Guillen 88' |

Estadio Panamericano, San Cristóbal
Referee: Diana Pérez (Mexico)
25 February 2022
19:00

| Canada | 7–0 | Saint Kitts and Nevis |
|---|---|---|
| Small 9', 33'; Smith 17', 30'; Ward 21', 44'; Courtnall 89' | Report |

Estadio Panamericano, San Cristóbal
Referee: Tori Penso (United States)

27 February 2022
16:00

| Saint Kitts and Nevis | 7–2 | Trinidad and Tobago |
|---|---|---|
| Bailey-Williams 6', 8', 30' (pen.); Claxton 22', 45+4', 48'; Stokes 61' (pen.) | Report | Serrant 33'; Mendez 75' |

Estadio Panamericano, San Cristóbal
Referee: Katia García (Mexico)
27 February 2022
19:00

| El Salvador | 0–4 | Canada |
|---|---|---|
| | Report | Grant-Clavijo 26'; Smith 53'; Thurton 63', 77' |

Estadio Panamericano, San Cristóbal
Referee: Odette Hamilton (Jamaica)

1 March 2022
16:00

| El Salvador | 5–0 | Saint Kitts and Nevis |
|---|---|---|
| I. Recinos 1'; Uribe 16', 45+5'; Sánchez 37' (pen.); Amaya 64' (pen.) | Report |

Estadio Panamericano, San Cristóbal
Referee: Priscilla Pérez (Mexico)
1 March 2022
19:00

| Canada | 5–0 | Trinidad and Tobago |
|---|---|---|
| Ward 37'; Thurton 49'; Melenhorst 58'; Jourde 64'; Novak 90' | Report |

Estadio Panamericano, San Cristóbal
Referee: Tatiana Guzmán (Nicaragua)

=== Group H ===
| Pos | Team | Pld | W | D | L | GF | GA | GD | Pts | Qualification |
|---|---|---|---|---|---|---|---|---|---|---|
| 1 | Guatemala | 3 | 2 | 1 | 0 | 5 | 3 | +2 | 7 | Knockout stage |
| 2 | Haiti | 3 | 1 | 2 | 0 | 3 | 2 | +1 | 5 | Knockout stage |
| 3 | Jamaica | 3 | 1 | 1 | 1 | 3 | 1 | +2 | 4 | Knockout stage |
| 4 | Cuba | 3 | 0 | 0 | 3 | 3 | 8 | −5 | 0 | |

Source: CONCACAF
Rules for classification: Group stage tiebreakers
26 February 2022
16:00

| Jamaica | 0–1 | Guatemala |
|---|---|---|
| | Report | Contreras 90' |

Estadio Panamericano, San Cristóbal
Referee: Mirian León (El Salvador)
26 February 2022
19:00

| Haiti | 2–1 | Cuba |
|---|---|---|
| Ornis 32'; Marcellus 41' | Report | Palma 71' (pen.) |

Estadio Panamericano, San Cristóbal
Referee: Francia González (Mexico)

28 February 2022
16:00

| Cuba | 0–3 | Jamaica |
|---|---|---|
| | Report | Simmonds 34', 49'; Salmon 81' |

Estadio Panamericano, San Cristóbal
Referee: Katja Koroleva (United States)
28 February 2022
19:00

| Guatemala | 1–1 | Haiti |
|---|---|---|
| Cruz 21' | Report | Marcellus 45' |

Estadio Panamericano, San Cristóbal
Referee: Melissa Borjas (Honduras)

2 March 2022
16:00

| Guatemala | 3–2 | Cuba |
|---|---|---|
| Cruz 36', 77' (pen.); Romero 54' | Report | Palma 45+1' (pen.); Zara 90+3' |

Estadio Panamericano, San Cristóbal
Referee: Francia González (Mexico)
2 March 2022
19:00

| Haiti | 0–0 | Jamaica |
|---|---|---|
| | Report |

Estadio Panamericano, San Cristóbal
Referee: Katia García (Mexico)

== Knockout stage ==
In the knockout stage, if a match is level at the end of 90 minutes, extra time is played, and if still tied after extra time, the match is decided by a penalty shoot-out (Regulations Article 12.13).

=== Bracket ===
Round of 16
4 March – Santo Domingo
United States | 14
Suriname | 0
5 March – San Cristóbal
Haiti | 2
Guyana | 1
4 March – San Cristóbal
Puerto Rico | 7
Saint Kitts and Nevis | 0
5 March – Santo Domingo
Guatemala | 2
Bermuda | 0
4 March – Santo Domingo
Canada | 13
Cayman Islands | 0
5 March – San Cristóbal
Panama | 3
Jamaica | 0
4 March – San Cristóbal
El Salvador | 5
Dominican Republic | 2
5 March – Santo Domingo
Mexico | 9
Curaçao | 0

Quarter-finals
8 March – San Cristóbal
United States | 6
Haiti | 0
8 March – San Cristóbal
Puerto Rico | 3
Guatemala | 0
8 March – Santo Domingo
Canada | 1
Panama | 0
8 March – Santo Domingo
El Salvador | 1
Mexico | 5

Semi-finals
10 March – Santo Domingo
United States | 7
Puerto Rico | 0
10 March – Santo Domingo
Canada | 0
Mexico | 1

Final
12 March – Santo Domingo
United States | 2
Mexico | 0
Third place playoff
12 March – Santo Domingo
Puerto Rico | 0
Canada | 2

=== Round of 16 ===
4 March 2022
16:00

| United States | 14–0 | Suriname |
|---|---|---|
| Colton 1', 88'; Kitahata 18' (pen.), 46', 52'; DellaPeruta 24'; Cooper 47', 82', 90'; Thompson 54', 85'; Reale 67' (pen.); Patterson 72'; Mason 80' | Report |

Estadio Olímpico Félix Sánchez, Santo Domingo
Referee: Astrid Gramajo (Guatemala)

4 March 2022
16:00

| Puerto Rico | 7–0 | Saint Kitts and Nevis |
|---|---|---|
| Bailey-Williams 8' (o.g.); Nieves 12'; Hart 13', 31' (pen.), 33'; Garner 45+2'; Torres 71' | Report |

Estadio Panamericano, San Cristóbal
Referee: Crystal Sobers (Trinidad and Tobago)

4 March 2022
19:00

| Canada | 13–0 | Cayman Islands |
|---|---|---|
| Novak 5', 51'; Smith 7', 15', 45+2', 47'; Grant-Clavijo 39', 73'; Burns 60'; Courtnall 69'; Pante 74'; Melenhorst 76'; Jourde 85' | Report |

Estadio Olímpico Félix Sánchez, Santo Domingo
Referee: Diana Pérez (Mexico)

4 March 2022
19:00

| El Salvador | 5–2 | Dominican Republic |
|---|---|---|
| I. Recinos 31'; Sánchez 33', 70'; Reyes 40', 87' | Report | Clase 43'; A. Díaz 58' |

Estadio Panamericano, San Cristóbal
Referee: Tori Penso (United States)

5 March 2022
16:00

| Mexico | 9–0 | Curaçao |
|---|---|---|
| Avilez 8', 16'; Delgado 35', 47'; Villanueva 63' (pen.); Vázquez 71' (pen.); Marroquin 73'; Chavero 81' (pen.); Maldonado 84' | Report |

Estadio Olímpico Félix Sánchez, Santo Domingo
Referee: Katja Koroleva (United States)

5 March 2022
16:00

| Panama | 3–0 | Jamaica |
|---|---|---|
| Camarena 11'; Natis 39' (pen.); Atencio 62' | Report |

Estadio Panamericano, San Cristóbal
Referee: Tatiana Guzmán (Nicaragua)

5 March 2022
19:00

| Guatemala | 2–0 | Bermuda |
|---|---|---|
| Texaj 56'; Xiquin 58' | Report |

Estadio Olímpico Félix Sánchez, Santo Domingo
Referee: Melissa Borjas (Honduras)

5 March 2022
19:00

| Haiti | 2–1 | Guyana |
|---|---|---|
| Moryl 58'; Ornis 88' | Report | Moore 37' |

Estadio Panamericano, San Cristóbal
Referee: Priscilla Pérez (Mexico)

=== Quarter-finals ===
8 March 2022
16:00

| United States | 6–0 | Haiti |
|---|---|---|
| Mason 8'; Thompson 50'; Jackson 68'; DellaPeruta 78' (pen.); Patterson 87'; Cooper 90+4' | Report |

Estadio Panamericano, San Cristóbal
Referee: Tatiana Guzmán (Nicaragua)

8 March 2022
16:00

| Puerto Rico | 3–0 | Guatemala |
|---|---|---|
| Es. González 32', 72'; Pizarro 41' (pen.) | Report |

Estadio Olímpico Félix Sánchez, Santo Domingo
Referee: Francia González (Mexico)

8 March 2022
19:00

| Canada | 1–0 | Panama |
|---|---|---|
| Ward 29' (pen.) | Report |

Estadio Panamericano, San Cristóbal
Referee: Katja Koroleva (United States)

8 March 2022
19:00

| El Salvador | 1–5 | Mexico |
|---|---|---|
| Sánchez 52' | Report | Maldonado 13'; Mauleón 35', 45+1'; Cazares 81'; Guzmán 84' |

Estadio Olímpico Félix Sánchez, Santo Domingo
Referee: Melissa Borjas (Honduras)

=== Semi-finals ===
Winners qualified for the 2022 FIFA U-20 Women's World Cup.

10 March 2022
16:00

| United States | 7–0 | Puerto Rico |
|---|---|---|
| DellaPeruta 19'; Moultrie 22'; Cooper 35', 41' (pen.); Jackson 65', 76', 81' | Report |

Estadio Olímpico Félix Sánchez, Santo Domingo
Referee: Odette Hamilton (Jamaica)

10 March 2022
19:00

| Canada | 0–1 | Mexico |
|---|---|---|
| | Report | Vázquez 27' |

Estadio Olímpico Félix Sánchez, Santo Domingo
Referee: Astrid Gramajo (Guatemala)

=== 3rd Place ===
Winner qualified for 2022 FIFA U-20 Women's World Cup.

12 March 2022
13:40

| Puerto Rico | 0–2 | Canada |
|---|---|---|
| | Report | Burns 38' (pen.); Jourde 39' |

Estadio Olímpico Félix Sánchez, Santo Domingo
Referee: Katia García (Mexico)

=== Final ===
12 March 2022
16:40

| United States | 2–0 | Mexico |
|---|---|---|
| Cooper 3'; DellaPeruta 42' (pen.) | Report |

Estadio Olímpico Félix Sánchez, Santo Domingo
Referee: Marianela Araya (Costa Rica)

== Winners ==
2022 CONCACAF Women's U-20 Championship

United States
Seventh title

== Goalscorers ==
There were 184 goals scored in 40 matches, for an average of 4.6 goals per match.

8 goals

- (United States) Michelle Cooper

7 goals

- (Canada) Olivia Smith
- (United States) Andrea Kitahata

6 goals

- (Mexico) Aylín Avilez
- (United States) Simone Jackson
- (United States) Avery Patterson

5 goals

- (Puerto Rico) Brooke Hart
- (Mexico) Maritza Maldonado
- (United States) Talia DellaPeruta

4 goals

- (Canada) Holly Ward
- (El Salvador) Victoria Sánchez

3 goals

- (Canada) Miya Grant-Clavijo
- (Canada) Florianne Jourde
- (Canada) Kaila Novak
- (Canada) Serita Thurton
- (El Salvador) Josseline Uribe
- (Guatemala) Celsa Cruz
- (Mexico) Paola Chavero
- (Mexico) Natalia Mauleón
- (Mexico) Alexia Villanueva
- (Panama) Shayari Camarena
- (Saint Kitts and Nevis) Iyanla Bailey-Williams
- (Saint Kitts and Nevis) Jahzara Claxton
- (United States) Emily Colton
- (United States) Emily Mason
- (United States) Alexis Missimo
- (United States) Alyssa Thompson

2 goals

- (Canada) Zoe Burns
- (Canada) Brooklyn Courtnall
- (Canada) Keera Melenhorst
- (Canada) Nikayla Small
- (Cuba) Yerly Palma
- (Dominican Republic) Ariana Díaz
- (Dominican Republic) Angelina Vargas
- (El Salvador) Isabella Recinos
- (El Salvador) Emely Reyes
- (Haiti) Rose-Alya Marcellus
- (Haiti) Valentina Ornis
- (Jamaica) Kameron Simmonds
- (Mexico) Anette Vázquez
- (Mexico) Daniela Delgado
- (Puerto Rico) Ivy Garner
- (Puerto Rico) Estefanía González
- (Puerto Rico) Alondra Nieves
- (United States) Olivia Moultrie

1 goal

- (Canada) Mia Pante
- (Cuba) Elizabeth Zara
- (Dominican Republic) Liliane Clase
- (Dominican Republic) Gabriela Marte
- (El Salvador) Andrea Amaya
- (El Salvador) Lesly Calderón
- (El Salvador) Linda Guillen
- (Guatemala) María Contreras
- (Guatemala) Keyla Romero
- (Guatemala) Elisa Texaj
- (Guatemala) Daniela Xiquin
- (Guyana) Samantha Banfield
- (Guyana) Inari Moore
- (Guyana) Audrey Narine
- (Haiti) Maudeline Moryl
- (Honduras) Larissa Arias
- (Jamaica) Christina Salmon
- (Mexico) Carol Cazares
- (Mexico) Tatiana Flores
- (Mexico) Kinberly Guzmán
- (Mexico) Amanda Marroquin
- (Nicaragua) Inés Navarrete
- (Panama) Yasli Atencio
- (Panama) Emily Cedeño
- (Panama) Hilary Jaén
- (Panama) Wendy Natis
- (Panama) Elibeth Vásquez
- (Puerto Rico) Bryana Pizarro
- (Puerto Rico) Jessica Torres
- (Saint Kitts and Nevis) Ellie Stokes
- (Trinidad and Tobago) Shurella Mendez
- (Trinidad and Tobago) Maria-Frances Serrant
- (United States) Aidan McConnell
- (United States) Lilly Reale

1 own goal

- (Dominican Republic) Gabriela Marte (against the United States)
- (Guyana) Hasha Holder (against Panama)
- (Saint Kitts and Nevis) Iyanla Bailey-Williams (against Puerto Rico)

Source: CONCACAF

== Qualified teams for FIFA U-20 Women's World Cup ==
| Team | Qualified on | Previous appearances in FIFA U-20 Women's World Cup^{1} |
|---|---|---|
| Costa Rica **(H)**^{2} | 17 November 2020 | 2 (2010, 2014) |
| United States | 10 March 2022 | 9 (**2002**, 2004, 2006, **2008**, 2010, **2012**, 2014, 2016, 2018) |
| Mexico | 10 March 2022 | 8 (2002, 2006, 2008, 2010, 2012, 2014, 2016, 2018) |
| Canada | 12 March 2022 | 7 (2002, 2004, 2006, 2008, 2012, 2014, 2016) |

^{1} Bold indicates champions for that year. Italic indicates hosts for that year.
^{2} (H) qualified as host of 2022 FIFA U-20 Women's World Cup.

== Awards ==
| Golden Ball | Golden Boot | Golden Glove |
|---|---|---|
| (United States) Michelle Cooper | (United States) Michelle Cooper | (Canada) Anna Karpenko |
CONCACAF Fair Play Award
Mexico

Best XI
| Goalkeeper | Defenders | Midfielders | Forwards |
|---|---|---|---|
| (Canada) Anna Karpenko | (United States) Emily Mason; (Canada) Zoe Burns; (Mexico) Kinberly Guzmán | (United States) Alexis Missimo; (Canada) Florianne Jourde; (United States) Emily Colton; (Mexico) Aylín Avilez | (Puerto Rico) Brooke Hart; (United States) Michelle Cooper; (Mexico) Natalia Mauleón |
