= Giselle Espinoza =

Mexican footballer (born 2005)

Personal information
- Full name: Giselle Espinoza Parra
- Date of birth: 8 March 2005 (age 21)
- Place of birth: Georgia, United States
- Height: 1.65 m (5 ft 5 in)
- Position: Left-back

Team information
- Current team: Juárez
- Number: 16

Senior career*
Years	Team	Apps	(Gls)
2023–2024	Pachuca	16	(5)
2024–	Juárez	10	(0)

International career
2023–2024	Mexico U20		
- * Club domestic league appearances and goals as of March 2024

Giselle Espinoza Parra (born 8 March 2005) is a professional footballer who plays as a left-back for Liga MX Femenil side Juárez. Born and raised in the United States, she represents Mexico internationally.

== Career ==
Espinoza started her career in 2023 with Pachuca. Afterwards, she signed for Juárez in 2024.

== International career ==
Since 2023, Espinoza has been part of the Mexico U-20 team.

== Honours ==
Mexico U-20

- CONCACAF Women's U-20 Championship: 2023
