= 2023 CONCACAF Women's U-20 Championship =

12th edition of the CONCACAF Women's U-20 Championship

Tournament details
- Host country: Dominican Republic
- Dates: 25 May – 4 June
- Teams: 8 (from 1 confederation)
- Venue(s): 2 (in 2 host cities)

Final positions
- Champions: Mexico (2nd title)
- Runners-up: United States
- Third place: Canada
- Fourth place: Costa Rica

Tournament statistics
- Matches played: 16
- Goals scored: 76 (4.75 per match)
- Top scorer(s): (Costa Rica) Sheika Scott (6 goals)
- Best player(s): (Mexico) Alice Soto
- Best goalkeeper: (Mexico) Itzel Velasco
- Fair play award: United States

The 2023 CONCACAF Women's U-20 Championship was the 12th edition of the CONCACAF Women's U-20 Championship, an international youth football championship organised by CONCACAF for the women's under-20 national teams of the North, Central American and Caribbean region. It took place in Santo Domingo and San Cristóbal, Dominican Republic, between 25 May and 4 June 2023.

The top four teams of the tournament qualified for the 2024 FIFA U-20 Women's World Cup in Colombia as the CONCACAF representatives.

The United States were the two-time defending champions, having won the 2020 and 2022 editions.

Mexico won the tournament by defeating the United States in the final on 4 June 2023 with a 2–1 score. Canada qualified to the 2024 FIFA U-20 Women's World Cup as the third place team by defeating Costa Rica with a 5–3 score in the third place match. Costa Rica eventually also qualified as an additional slot was allocated to CONCACAF.

== Qualification ==
The qualifying competition was held in April 2023. For six of the available eight slots, a record number of thirty–two teams were drawn into six total groups (two groups of six teams and four groups of five teams each). and will play in a single round-robin format in centralized venues. The six group winners advanced to the CONCACAF Women's U-20 Championship final tournament. In addition, the United States and Mexico, the two highest-ranked CONCACAF teams in the CONCACAF Women's U-20 Rankings of August 29, 2022, qualified automatically.

=== Qualified teams ===
The following teams qualified for the CONCACAF Women's U-20 Championship final tournament.

Team	Method of qualification	Date of qualification	Finals appearance	Previous best performance	Previous World Cup appearances
Mexico	Automatic	17 February 2023	12th	Champions (2018)	9
United States (title holders)	Automatic	17 February 2023	12th	Champions (2006, 2010, 2012, 2014, 2015, 2020, 2022)	10
Panama	Qualification Group B winner	18 April 2023	7th	Fourth place (2012)	0
Jamaica	Qualification Group E winner	18 April 2023	12th	Fourth place (2006)	0
Puerto Rico	Qualification Group D winner	19 April 2023	3rd	Fourth place (2022)	0
Dominican Republic	Qualification Group C winner	19 April 2023	4th	Semi-finalist (2020)	0
Canada	Qualification Group A winner	22 April 2023	10th	Champions (2004, 2008)	8
Costa Rica	Qualification Group F winner	23 April 2023	7th	Third place (2004, 2010, 2014)	3

== Venues ==
2023 CONCACAF Women's U-20 Championship is located in the Dominican Republic	Santo Domingo	San Cristóbal
2023 CONCACAF Women's U-20 Championship is located in the Dominican Republic	Estadio Olímpico Félix Sánchez	Estadio Panamericano
2023 CONCACAF Women's U-20 Championship is located in the Dominican Republic	Capacity: 27,000	Capacity: 2,800

== Draw ==
The draw of the tournament was held on 4 May 2023 at the CONCACAF Headquarters in Miami, Florida. The 8 teams were drawn into two groups of four teams, based on the CONCACAF Women's Under-20 Ranking at September 2022.

Pot 1	Pot 2	Pot 3	Pot 4
United States; Mexico	Canada; Costa Rica	Jamaica; Puerto Rico	Dominican Republic; Panama

== Squads ==
Players born on or after 1 January 2004 are eligible to compete. Each team must register a squad of 21 players, three of whom must be goalkeepers.

== Format ==
On 13 February 2023, CONCACAF announced the lunch of a new revamped format for the youth competitions, in which Women's Under-17 and Under-20 competitions will now commence with a six-group Qualifying Stage played amongst teams ranked between 3 and 41, according to the respective CONCACAF Rankings. with the qualifying stage to be played in a round robin format and the six group winners advancing to the main tournament. The Group Stage of the main tournament will be composed of two groups of four teams each (eight teams in total). This will include the two top-ranked teams (pre-seeded into this round) and the six group winners of the Qualifying stage. After round-robin play, the top two teams of each group will advance to the semifinals. The knockout stage – semifinals, third place match, and final – will be played in a single match direct elimination format, with the finalists and the third place match winner qualifying for the respective youth FIFA Women's World Cup.

Eight teams will play in the tournament, will be drawn into two groups of four teams, and will play single round-robin matches. The top two teams of each group will advance to the knockout stage, The knockout stage will feature the semi-finals, a third-place match, and the final to determine the champions. the two semi-finalists alongside the third-place match winner will qualify for the 2024 FIFA U-20 Women's World Cup. Although, on 4 October 2023, FIFA expanded the World Cup to 24 teams, meaning the 4 semi-finalists all qualified.

=== Tiebreakers ===
The ranking of teams in each group is determined as follows (Regulations Article 12.8):

1. Points obtained in all group matches (three points for a win, one for a draw, zero for a loss).
2. Goal difference in all group matches.
3. Number of goals scored in all group matches.
4. Points obtained in the matches played between the teams in question.
5. Goal difference in the matches played between the teams in question.
6. Number of goals scored in the matches played between the teams in question.
7. Fair play points in all group matches (only one deduction can be applied to a player in a single match):
  - Yellow card: −1 point
  - Indirect red card (second yellow card): −3 points
  - Direct red card: −4 points
  - Yellow card and direct red card: −5 points
8. Drawing of lots.

== Group stage ==
All times are local, AST (UTC−4).

=== Group A ===
Pos	Team	Pld	W	D	L	GF	GA	GD	Pts	Qualification
1	United States	3	3	0	0	15	2	+13	9	Knockout stage
2	Canada	3	2	0	1	11	5	+6	6	Knockout stage
3	Jamaica	3	1	0	2	4	9	−5	3	
4	Panama	3	0	0	3	1	15	−14	0	

Source: CONCACAF
Rules for classification: Group stage tiebreakers
26 May 2023
16:00

Canada	4–0	Jamaica
Chukwu 39', 45+1'; Smith 56'; Watson 90+4'	Report

Estadio Olímpico Félix Sánchez, Santo Domingo
Referee: Marianela Araya (Costa Rica)
26 May 2023
19:00

United States	6–0	Panama
Dudley 1'; Sentnor 41' (pen.), 49' (pen.); Rader 45'; Martinho 64'; Lemos 71' (pen.)	Report

Estadio Olímpico Félix Sánchez, Santo Domingo
Referee: Katia García (Mexico)

28 May 2023
15:00

Panama	0–5	Canada
	Report	Markesini 22'; Garay 25' (o.g.); Smith 29', 41'; Allen 51'

Estadio Olímpico Félix Sánchez, Santo Domingo
Referee: Sandra Benítez (El Salvador)
28 May 2023
18:00

Jamaica	0–4	United States
	Report	Dahlien 11', 47', 79'; Dellarose 49'

Estadio Olímpico Félix Sánchez, Santo Domingo
Referee: Astrid Gramajo (Guatemala)

30 May 2023
15:00

Jamaica	4–1	Panama
Atkinson 16'; Richards 32' (pen.); Raghunandanan 37'; Van Zanten 74' (pen.)	Report	Rosas 79' (pen.)

Estadio Olímpico Félix Sánchez, Santo Domingo
Referee: Myriam Marcotte (Canada)
30 May 2023
18:00

United States	5–2	Canada
Dahlien 3'; Sentnor 11', 55'; Thompson 45+1' (pen.); Gamero 61'	Report	Allen 54' (pen.); Rose 67'

Estadio Olímpico Félix Sánchez, Santo Domingo
Referee: Katia García (Mexico)

=== Group B ===
Pos	Team	Pld	W	D	L	GF	GA	GD	Pts	Qualification
1	Mexico	3	3	0	0	11	0	+11	9	Knockout stage
2	Costa Rica	3	2	0	1	10	7	+3	6	Knockout stage
3	Dominican Republic (H)	3	1	0	2	3	8	−5	3	
4	Puerto Rico	3	0	0	3	4	13	−9	0	

Source: CONCACAF
Rules for classification: Group stage tiebreakers
(H) Hosts
25 May 2023
15:00

Costa Rica	7–3	Puerto Rico
Scott 7', 87', 90+4'; Rodríguez 19'; Y. Fonseca 45+2'; Matarrita 45+5'; Diaz 90'	Report	Colon 41' (pen.), 61'; Garcia 55'

Estadio Panamericano, San Cristóbal
Referee: Ekaterina Koroleva (United States)
25 May 2023
18:00

Mexico	4–0	Dominican Republic
T. Flores 2'; Espinoza 39'; Colin 80'; Gordon 83'	Report

Estadio Panamericano, San Cristóbal
Referee: Myriam Marcotte (Canada)

27 May 2023
15:00

Dominican Republic	1–3	Costa Rica
Mercedes 90+5'	Report	Scott 45+1' (pen.); Jiménez 59'; Matarrita 77'

Estadio Panamericano, San Cristóbal
Referee: Carly Shaw-MacLaren (Canada)
27 May 2023
18:00

Puerto Rico	0–4	Mexico
	Report	Servín 18'; M. Flores 38'; Vargas 45+4' (pen.); Gordon 90+3'

Estadio Panamericano, San Cristóbal
Referee: Odette Hamilton (Jamaica)

29 May 2023
15:00

Puerto Rico	1–2	Dominican Republic
Garcia 37'	Report	Vargas 57' (pen.); Castro 65'

Estadio Panamericano, San Cristóbal
Referee: Natalie Simon (United States)
29 May 2023
18:00

Mexico	3–0	Costa Rica
M. Flores 16', 20'; Saldívar 45+1'	Report

Estadio Panamericano, San Cristóbal
Referee: Ekaterina Koroleva (United States)

== Knockout stage ==
In the knockout stage, if a match is level at the end of 90 minutes, extra time is played, and if still tied after extra time, the match is decided by a penalty shoot-out (Regulations Article 12.13).

=== Bracket ===
Semi-finals
2 June – Santo Domingo
Mexico	2
Canada	1
2 June – Santo Domingo
United States	2
Costa Rica	1

Final
4 June – Santo Domingo
Mexico	2
United States	1
Third place match
4 June – Santo Domingo
Canada (a.e.t.)	5
Costa Rica	3

=== Semi-finals ===
Winners qualified for the 2024 FIFA U-20 Women's World Cup.

2 June 2023
15:00

Mexico	2–1	Canada
Orozco 77'; Soto 90+2'	Report	Briggs 65'

Estadio Olímpico Félix Sánchez, Santo Domingo
Referee: Astrid Gramajo (Guatemala)

2 June 2023
18:00

United States	2–1	Costa Rica
Aikey 39'; Martinho 49'	Report	Scott 55' (pen.)

Estadio Olímpico Félix Sánchez, Santo Domingo
Referee: Sandra Benítez (El Salvador)

=== Third place match ===
Winner qualified for 2024 FIFA U-20 Women's World Cup. Loser eventually also qualified as an additional slot was allocated to CONCACAF.

4 June 2023
12:00

Canada	5–3 (a.e.t.)	Costa Rica
Ottey 16'; Jourde 27'; Smith 75'; Chukwu 101', 120+1'	Report	Solano 24'; Scott 45+1'; Briceño 45+6'

Estadio Olímpico Félix Sánchez, Santo Domingo
Referee: Odette Hamilton (Jamaica)

=== Final ===
4 June 2023
15:00

Mexico	2–1	United States
Orozco 71'; Servín 88'	Report	Gamero 80'

Estadio Olímpico Félix Sánchez, Santo Domingo
Referee: Marianela Araya (Costa Rica)

2023 CONCACAF Women's U-20 Championship winners

Mexico
Second title

== Goalscorers ==
There were 76 goals scored in 16 matches, for an average of 4.75 goals per match.

6 goals

- (Costa Rica) Sheika Scott

4 goals

- (Canada) Annabelle Chukwu
- (Canada) Olivia Smith
- (United States) Madeline Dahlien
- (United States) Ally Sentnor

3 goals

- (Mexico) Maribel Flores

2 goals

- (Canada) Amanda Allen
- (Canada) Florianne Jourde
- (Canada) Ella Ottey
- (Costa Rica) Verónica Matarrita
- (Mexico) Hailey Gordon
- (Mexico) Mailin Orozco
- (Mexico) Fátima Servín
- (Puerto Rico) Enasia Colon
- (Puerto Rico) Kennedy Garcia
- (United States) Onyeka Gamero
- (United States) Lauren Martinho

1 goal

- (Canada) Kayla Briggs
- (Canada) Zoe Markesini
- (Canada) Nyah Rose
- (Canada) Renee Watson
- (Costa Rica) Josselyn Briceño
- (Costa Rica) Monserrat Diaz
- (Costa Rica) Yoselin Fonseca
- (Costa Rica) Jimena Jiménez
- (Costa Rica) Priscilla Rodríguez
- (Costa Rica) Marian Solano
- (Dominican Republic) Alexa Castro
- (Dominican Republic) Renata Mercedes
- (Dominican Republic) Angelina Vargas
- (Jamaica) Natoya Atkinson
- (Jamaica) Maya Raghunandanan
- (Jamaica) Davia Richards
- (Jamaica) Amelia Van Zanten
- (Mexico) Natalia Colin
- (Mexico) Giselle Espinoza
- (Mexico) Tatiana Flores
- (Mexico) Montserrat Saldívar
- (Mexico) Alice Soto
- (Mexico) Valerie Vargas
- (Panama) Meredith Rosas
- (United States) Jasmine Aikey
- (United States) Tessa Dellarose
- (United States) Jordynn Dudley
- (United States) Ally Lemos
- (United States) Katherine Rader
- (United States) Gisele Thompson

1 own goal

- (Panama) Alejandra Garay (against Canada)

Source: CONCACAF

== Qualified teams for FIFA U-20 Women's World Cup ==
The following four teams from CONCACAF qualified for the 2024 FIFA U-20 Women's World Cup in Colombia.

Team	Qualified on	Previous appearances in FIFA U-20 Women's World Cup^{1}
Mexico	2 June 2023	9 (2002, 2006, 2008, 2010, 2012, 2014, 2016, 2018, 2022)
United States	2 June 2023	10 (**2002**, 2004, 2006, **2008**, 2010, **2012**, 2014, 2016, 2018, 2022)
Canada	4 June 2023	8 (2002, 2004, 2006, 2008, 2012, 2014, 2016, 2022)
Costa Rica	4 October 2023 (Note: After the announcement of the expansion of the 2024 FIFA U-20 Women's World Cup to 24 teams, Costa Rica took the new fourth spot as CONCACAF representative as they ended fourth in this tournament.)	3 (2010, 2014, 2022)

^{1} Bold indicates champions for that year. Italic indicates hosts for that year.

== Awards ==
Golden Ball	Golden Boot	Golden Glove
(Mexico) Alice Soto	(Costa Rica) Sheika Scott	(Mexico) Itzel Velasco
CONCACAF Fair Play Award
United States
