= Simone Jackson =

American soccer player (born 2003)

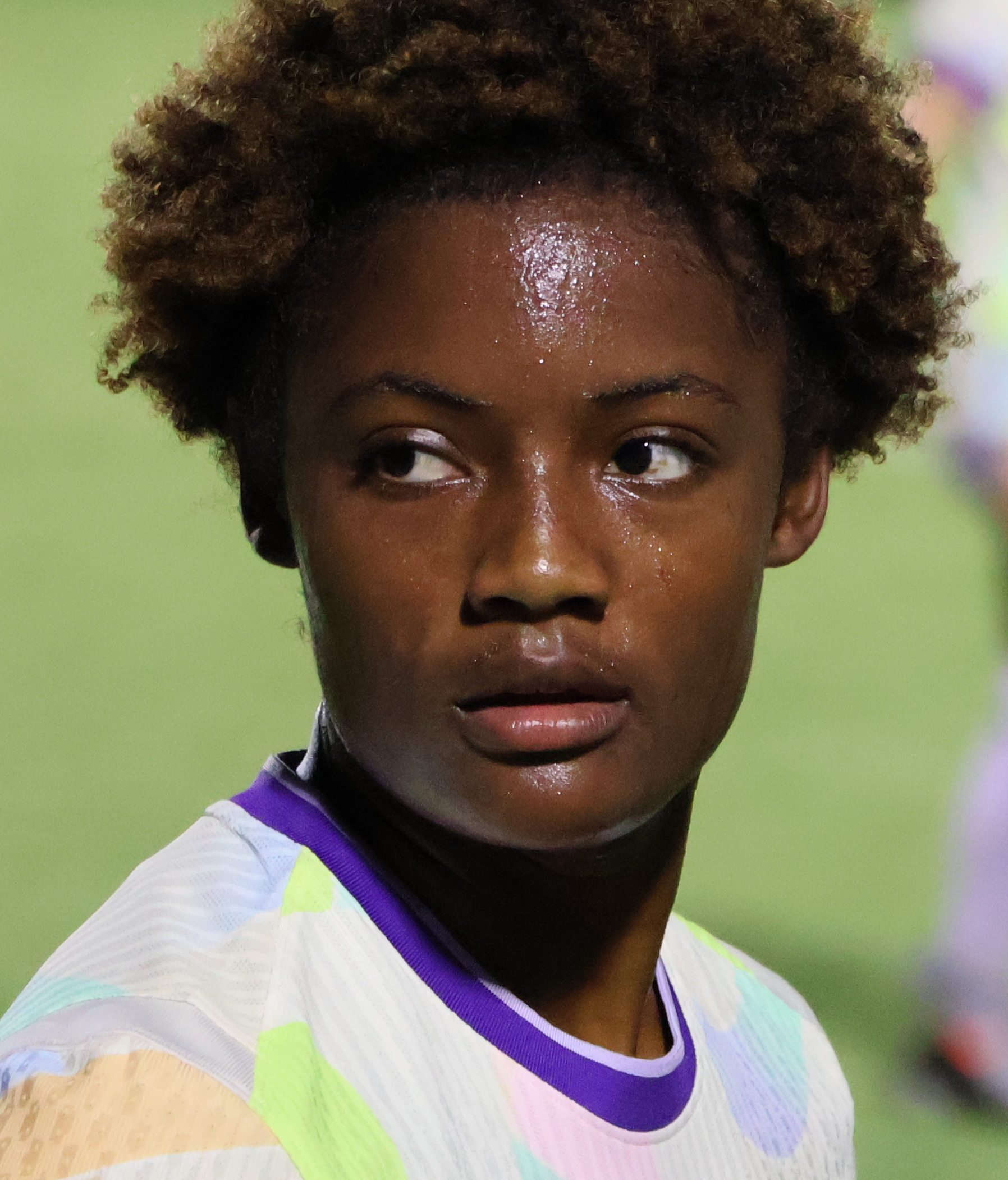
- Jackson with the Orlando Pride in 2026

Personal information
- Full name: Simone Peyton Jackson
- Date of birth: January 28, 2003 (age 23)
- Place of birth: Redondo Beach, California, U.S.
- Height: 5 ft 4 in (1.63 m)
- Position: Forward

Team information
- Current team: FC Rosengård (on loan from the Orlando Pride)
- Number: 80

Youth career
- So Cal Blues
- Slammers FC

College career
Years	Team	Apps	(Gls)
2021–2024	USC Trojans	73	(22)

Senior career*
Years	Team	Apps	(Gls)
2021–2022	LA Surf		
2023	Kansas City Current II		
2025–	Orlando Pride	17	(0)
2026–	→ FC Rosengård (loan)	0	(0)

International career^{‡}
2017–2018	United States U-15		
2018	United States U-16		
2019	United States U-17	4	(2)
2022	United States U-20	11	(8)
2025–	United States U-23	2	(0)
- * Club domestic league appearances and goals as of August 16, 2026 ‡ National team caps and goals as of December 2, 2025

Simone Peyton Jackson (born January 28, 2003) is an American professional soccer player who plays as a forward for Damallsvenskan club FC Rosengård, on loan from the Orlando Pride. She played college soccer for the USC Trojans. She has represented the United States at the youth international level.

== Early life ==
Jackson was born and raised in Redondo Beach, California. She began playing soccer with an AYSO team at age four. She attended Bishop Montgomery High School, where she played for the soccer, tennis, and track teams, and co-founded the school's Black Student Union. She played club soccer for So Cal Blues, winning the ECNL under-15 national championship in 2017, before moving to Slammers FC, where she was named ECNL All-American in 2019 and 2021. She committed to USC when she was a freshman. She was ranked by TopDrawerSoccer as the third-best recruit of her class.

== College career ==
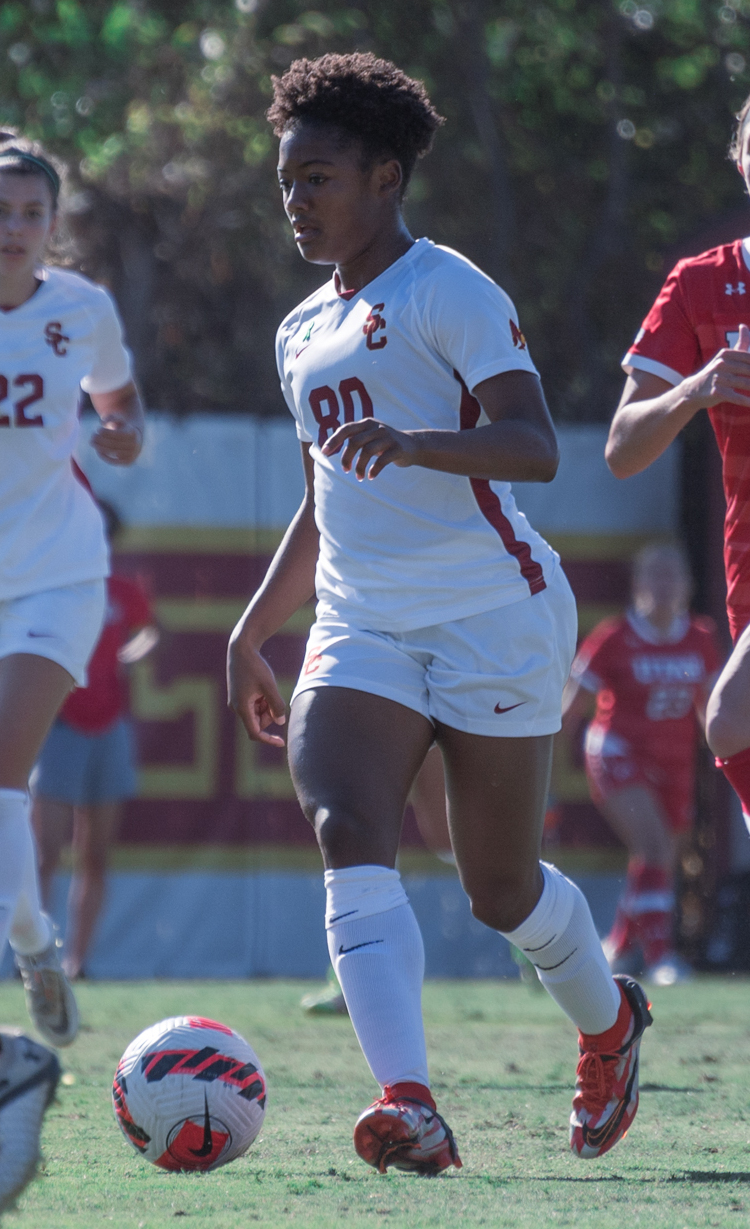
Jackson playing for USC in 2021

Jackson scored 5 goals and added 8 assists in 20 games (8 starts) in her freshman season with the USC Trojans in 2021, earning second-team All-Pac-12 honors. She scored a late equalizer in a 2–2 draw against Penn State in the second round of the NCAA tournament, but they lost on penalty kicks. She missed two games in her sophomore season while at the 2022 FIFA U-20 Women's World Cup but returned to start the last 16, scoring 6 goals with 3 assists, and was named first-team All-Pac-12. She scored 5 goals in 15 games (10 starts) in her junior season in 2023, being named second-team All-Pac-12. In her senior season in 2024, she scored 6 goals with 2 assists in 22 games (17 starts), earning third-team All-Big Ten honors. USC won their first-ever outright regular-season title, doing so in their first year in the Big Ten Conference. Jackson scored in four of her last five college games, including in the quarterfinals of the NCAA tournament, where she also made her penalty in shootout loss to Wake Forest after a 2–2 draw.

== Club career ==
Jackson joined the Orlando Pride as a non-roster invitee in the National Women's Soccer League (NWSL) preseason in January 2025. On May 29, the Pride announced that they had signed Jackson to her first professional contract on a four-year deal. She made her professional debut against Racing Louisville on June 20, coming on as a second-half substitute in a 2–0 loss. On September 2, she scored her first professional goal in Orlando's CONCACAF W Champions Cup debut, a 3–0 win over Alajuelense.

On August 19, 2026, Jackson joined Swedish club FC Rosengård on loan until June 30, 2026.

== International career ==
Jackson was first called up to the United States youth national team at the under-14 level in 2016. She played friendlies at the under-15, under-16, and under-17 levels, but her age group's FIFA U-17 Women's World Cup was cancelled due to the COVID-19 pandemic. When youth international play resumed, she helped the United States win the 2022 CONCACAF Women's U-20 Championship, scoring six goals in six games (four starts). She played in two games off the bench at the 2022 FIFA U-20 Women's World Cup, scoring in a 3–1 loss to Japan, as the United States failed to make it out of the group stage. She was called up to the under-23 team to play against NWSL competition in the 2023 preseason.

== Personal life ==
Jackson is the middle of three children born to Ann-Frances McLyn and John Jackson Jr. Her father is a sports commentator who played professional football and minor league baseball in the 1990s, having also played both sports at USC. Her older brother, John Jackson III, played wide receiver at USC before being signed by the Chicago Bears. Her grandfather, John Jackson Sr., was on the coaching staff for the USC Trojans football team in the 1970s.

== Honors and awards ==
USC Trojans

- Big Ten Conference: 2024

United States U20

- CONCACAF Women's U-20 Championship: 2022

Individual

- First-team All-Pac-12: 2022
- Second-team All-Pac-12: 2021, 2023
- Third-team All-Big Ten: 2024
