= Puerto Rico women's national under-20 football team =

Association women's youth football team from Puerto Rico

Puerto Rico women's U-20
- Nickname(s): El Huracán Azul (The Blue Hurricane); Las Boricuas (The Boricuas)
- Association: Federación Puertorriqueña de Fútbol (FPF)
- Confederation: CONCACAF (North America)
- Sub-confederation: CFU (Caribbean)
- Head coach: (United States) Nathaniel González
- Captain: JLo Varada
- Home stadium: Estadio Juan Ramón Loubriel
- FIFA code: PUR
First colors	Second colors

First international
- Puerto Rico 0–4 Dominican Republic (Labadee Haiti; 8 January 2002)

Biggest win
- Puerto Rico 11–0 Bonaire (San Cristóbal, Dominican Republic; 19 July 2017)

Biggest defeat
- Puerto Rico 0–7 United States (Santo Domingo, Dominican Republic; 27 February 2022)

CONCACAF Women's U-20 Championship
- Appearances: 3 (first in 2020)
- Best result: Fourth place (2022)

FIFA U-20 Women's World Cup
- Appearances: 0

The Puerto Rico women's national under-20 football team represents Puerto Rico in tournaments at the under-20 level of women's competitions. The team is controlled by the Puerto Rican Football Federation.

Singer Young Miko and model Karla Aponte played for the team in 2015.

== History ==
Puerto Rico women's national under-20 team have played their first match against Dominican Republic women's national under-20 football team and they won it by 4–0 goals which took place at Labadee, Haiti on 8 January 2002. In the recent performance of the team are very good the team have reached into the semifinals of 2022 CONCACAF Women's U-20 Championship. Puerto Rico women's national under-20 soccer have not yet qualified to FIFA U-20 Women's World Cup.

== Players ==
The following squad were called-up recently finished 2025 CONCACAF Women's U-20 Championship

No.	Pos.	Player	Date of birth (age)	Club
1	GK	Alondra Iriarte	11 April 2006 (aged 19)	(United States Soccer Federation) Green Bay Phoenix
12	GK	Trishelle López	19 May 2007 (aged 18)	(United States Soccer Federation) Florida West
21	GK	Ariana Anderson	13 January 2005 (aged 20)	(United States Soccer Federation) Georgia State Panthers
4	DF	Lauryn Smith	12 June 2007 (aged 17)	(United States Soccer Federation) Florida United
16	DF	Gemma Gillespie	6 February 2006 (aged 19)	(United States Soccer Federation) Butler Bulldogs
20	DF	Ayanna Thelusma	15 July 2005 (aged 19)	(United States Soccer Federation) Gardner–Webb Runnin' Bulldogs
5	MF	Camila Adame	31 January 2009 (aged 16)	(United States Soccer Federation) Florida Elite Soccer Academy
6	MF	Ashley McMahon	18 June 2006 (aged 18)	(United States Soccer Federation) James Madison Dukes
8	MF	Sarah Martínez	29 January 2007 (aged 18)	(United States Soccer Federation) North Carolina Courage
9	MF	Olivia Bevilacqua	13 July 2007 (aged 17)	(United States Soccer Federation) Nationals
10	MF	Maliya Maldonado	29 March 2007 (aged 18)	(United States Soccer Federation) Florida Premier
14	MF	Gabriella Garnett	7 June 2008 (aged 16)	(United States Soccer Federation) Atlanta Fire United
17	MF	Jayla Walton	23 July 2008 (aged 16)	(United States Soccer Federation) PDA Blue
19	MF	Payton Quiñones	22 February 2006 (aged 19)	(United States Soccer Federation) Stetson Hatters
2	FW	Evangelina Arocho	26 June 2007 (aged 17)	(The Football Association) Brooke House
3	FW	Estefanía González	12 May 2006 (aged 19)	(Royal Spanish Football Federation) Madrid CFF
7	FW	Giselle Falcón	12 January 2009 (aged 16)	(United States Soccer Federation) Bethesda
11	FW	Marilia Nieves-Melchor	10 February 2006 (aged 19)	(United States Soccer Federation) Kentucky Wildcats
13	FW	Aurora Gaines	12 February 2006 (aged 19)	(United States Soccer Federation) Arizona Wildcats
15	FW	Analisse Cheema	4 December 2007 (aged 17)	(United States Soccer Federation) RISE
18	FW	Susana Roberts	10 June 2007 (aged 17)	(United States Soccer Federation) Zoo City

== Fixtures and results ==
Legend

Win Draw Loss Fixtures

=== 2023 ===
15 April 2023 CONCACAF Women's U-20 Championship qualification GS	Puerto Rico	5–0	Guadeloupe	Rignaal Jean Francisca Stadium, Willemstad
18:00	Garcia 12'; Colon 40'; Gonzalez 52'; Chinea 72'; Martinez 88'	Report		Referee: Merlin Vanessa Soto (Honduras)

17 April 2023 CONCACAF Women's U-20 Championship qualification GS	Cayman Islands	1–6	Puerto Rico	Rignaal Jean Francisca Stadium, Willemstad
18:00	Kehoe 45+2'	Report	Garcia 9', 45+1'; Krakower 24'; Quinones 63'; Roberts 75'; Gregoris 90+2'	Referee: Melissa Borjas Pastrana (Honduras)

19 April 2023 CONCACAF Women's U-20 Championship qualification GS	Puerto Rico	5–0	Trinidad and Tobago	Rignaal Jean Francisca Stadium, Willemstad
18:00	Garcia 27', 82'; Colon 30', 76'; McMahon 51'	Report		Referee: Merlin Vanessa Soto (Honduras)

May 2023 CONCACAF Women's U-20 Championship GS	Puerto Rico	v	Santo Domingo, Dominican Republic
			Stadium: Félix Sánchez Olympic Stadium

May 2023 CONCACAF Women's U-20 Championship GS	Puerto Rico	v	Santo Domingo, Dominican Republic
			Stadium: Félix Sánchez Olympic Stadium

May 2023 CONCACAF Women's U-20 Championship GS	Puerto Rico	v	Santo Domingo, Dominican Republic
			Stadium: Félix Sánchez Olympic Stadium

== Competitive records ==
=== FIFA U-20 Women's World Cup ===
FIFA U-20 Women's World Cup record
Year	Round	Position	MP	W	D*	L	GF	GA
(Canada) 2002 to (Poland) 2026	Did not qualify							
Total	–	0/12	0	0	0	0	0	0

=== CONCACAF Women's U-20 Championship ===
CONCACAF Women's U-20 Championship record
Year	Result	MP	W	D	L	GF	GA
(Trinidad and Tobago) 2002 to (Trinidad and Tobago) 2018	Did not qualify						
(Dominican Republic) 2020	Round of 16	4	1	0	3	6	7
(Dominican Republic) 2022	Fourth place	6	4	0	2	14	15
(Dominican Republic) 2023	Group stage	3	0	0	3	4	13
Total	3/12	13	5	0	8	23	35
