= Shaneil Buckley =

Jamaican footballer (born 2005)

- Buckley with Florida State in 2026

Personal information
- Full name: Shaneil Shellicia Buckley
- Date of birth: May 20, 2005 (age 21)
- Height: 5 ft 3 in (1.60 m)
- Positions: Midfielder; forward

Team information
- Current team: Florida State Seminoles

Youth career
- Excelsior Eagles

College career
| Years | Team | Apps | (Gls) |
| 2024–2025 | Daytona State Falcons | 42 | (43) |
| 2026– | Florida State Seminoles | 9 | (1) |

Senior career*
| Years | Team | Apps | (Gls) |
- Frazsiers Whip

International career
| 2022 | Jamaica U-17 | | |
- Jamaica U-20
| 2022– | Jamaica | | |
- * Club domestic league appearances and goals

Shaneil Shellicia Buckley (born May 20, 2005) is a Jamaican college soccer player who plays as a midfielder for the Florida State Seminoles and the Jamaica national team. She previously played for the Daytona State Falcons.

== Early life ==
Buckley grew up in the Newland neighborhood of Portmore, Jamaica, the daughter of ShuShanne White. She is the niece of fellow international footballer Andre Lewis. Though her mother wanted her to go into track and field, she began playing football as a youngster at Excelsior High School. In her junior year at Excelsior in 2023, she scored 45 goals as the Eagles won their 11th national schoolgirls' title. She also played for Frazsiers Whip of the Jamaica Women's Premier League.

== College career ==
Buckley started college at Daytona State College in the United States in 2024, scoring 20 goals in 22 games in her freshman season. In the NJCAA national title game, she scored the overtime golden goal against Arizona Western to give the Falcons their first national championship. In her sophomore year in 2025, she scored 23 goals in 20 games and was named the United Soccer Coaches Junior College Division I Player of the Year. She led the Falcons to their second consecutive national title, winning on penalties over Arizona Western, and was named the NJCAA tournament's MVP and Most Outstanding Offensive Player.

After two seasons at Daytona State, she transferred to the reigning NCAA Division I champion Florida State Seminoles.

== International career ==
Buckley represented Jamaica's youth squads at the 2022 CONCACAF Women's U-17 Championship and the 2023 CONCACAF Women's U-20 Championship. On November 19, 2023, she scored her first senior goal in a 1–1 draw with Panama in the CONCACAF W Gold Cup qualifiers.

== Honors and awards ==
Daytona State Falcons

- NJCAA national championship: 2024, 2025

Individual

- United Soccer Coaches Junior College Player of the Year: 2025
- United Soccer Coaches Junior College All-American: 2024, 2025
- NJCAA national championship MVP: 2025
