= Paola Chavero =

Mexican footballer (born 2002)

Personal information
- Full name: Paola Chavero Álvarez
- Date of birth: 16 May 2002 (age 24)
- Place of birth: Tlalnepantla de Baz, State of Mexico, Mexico
- Height: 1.61 m (5 ft 3 in)
- Position: Winger

Team information
- Current team: UNAM
- Number: 13

Senior career*
Years	Team	Apps	(Gls)
2018–	UNAM	183	(11)

International career^{‡}
2022	Mexico U-20		
- * Club domestic league appearances and goals as of 31 January 2026 ‡ National team caps and goals as of 14 July 2023

Paola Chavero Álvarez (born 16 May 2002) is a Mexican professional footballer who plays as an attacking midfielder for Liga MX Femenil side UNAM. Chavero started her career in 2018 with UNAM. Chavero was also part of the team that participated in the 2022 FIFA U-20 Women's World Cup in Costa Rica.
