= Cady Chin See Chong =

Surinamese footballer

Personal information
- Full name: Cady Caroline Chin See Chong
- Date of birth: 6 March 2003 (age 23)
- Place of birth: Paramaribo, Suriname
- Height: 1.64 m (5 ft 5 in)
- Position: Left midfielder

Team information
- Current team: Transvaal

Senior career*
Years	Team	Apps	(Gls)
- Transvaal

International career^{‡}
2022–	Suriname	7	(3)
- * Club domestic league appearances and goals ‡ National team caps and goals as of 5 December 2023.

Cady Caroline Chin See Chong (born 6 March 2003) is a Surinamese footballer who plays as a left midfielder for SV Transvaal and the Suriname women's national team.

== Early life ==
Chin See Chong has played for Transvaal in Suriname.

== International career ==
Chin See Chong capped for Suriname at senior level during the 2022 CONCACAF W Championship qualification.
