= Shayari Camarena =

Panamanian footballer (born 2003)

Personal information
- Full name: Shayari Massiel Camarena
- Date of birth: 13 October 2003 (age 23)
- Place of birth: Panama City, Panama
- Position: Forward

Team information
- Current team: Chorrillo FC

Senior career*
Years	Team	Apps	(Gls)
- Tauro

International career
2022–	Panama		
- * Club domestic league appearances and goals

Shayari Massiel Nelly Camarena (born 13 October 2003) is a Panamanian footballer who plays as a forward for Chorrillo and the Panama women's national team.
