= Honduras women's national under-20 football team =

Honduran Football Team

Honduras
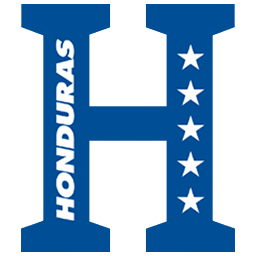
- Association: FENAFUTH
- Confederation: CONCACAF (North America)
- FIFA code: HON
| First colours | Second colours |

The Honduras women's national under-20 football team is the national women's u-20 football team of Honduras and is overseen by the Football Federation of Honduras. The team is allowed to participate at the different UNCAF and CONCACAF women's tournaments; as well to the FIFA U-20 Women's World Cup, although they haven't been able to qualify as of yet.

== Competitive record ==
=== CONCACAF Women's U-20 Championship ===
| Year | Record | Goals | Finish |
|---|---|---|---|
| (Trinidad and Tobago) 2002 | Did not Enter | | |
| (Canada) 2004 | Withdrew | | |
| (Mexico) 2006 | 1–0–1 | 3:3 | Qualifying tournament |
| (Mexico) 2008 | Withdrew | | |
| (Guatemala) 2010 | 0–0–2 | 1:15 | Qualifying tournament |
| (Panama) 2012 | 0–0–2 | 1:7 | Qualifying tournament |
| (Cayman Islands) 2014 | 3–1–2 | 9:15 | Group stage |
| (Honduras) 2015 | 1–1–3 | 4:13 | 4th |
| (Trinidad and Tobago) 2018 | 1–0–2 | 3:11 | Qualifying tournament |
| (Dominican Republic) 2019 | TBD | | |

== Head to head ==
- As of 24 June 2017

| Opponent | Record | Goals |
|---|---|---|
| Belize | 1–0–0 | 2:1 |
| Canada | 0–0–1 | 0:2 |
| Cayman Islands | 1–0–0 | 3:0 |
| Costa Rica | 0–0–4 | 1:26 |
| El Salvador | 0–1–1 | 3:6 |
| Guatemala | 1–0–1 | 2:3 |
| Jamaica | 0–1–0 | 2:2 |
| Mexico | 0–0–2 | 1:12 |
| Nicaragua | 1–0–0 | 2:1 |
| Panama | 1–0–1 | 3:2 |
| Trinidad and Tobago | 1–0–1 | 2:2 |
| United States | 0–0–1 | 0:7 |
| Totals | 6–2–12 | 21:64 |

== See also ==
- Football in Honduras
