= Maritza Maldonado =

Mexican footballer (born 2002)

Personal information
- Full name: Maritza Dardane Maldonado Velázquez
- Date of birth: 26 May 2002 (age 24)
- Place of birth: Guadalajara, Jalisco, Mexico
- Height: 1.71 m (5 ft 7 in)
- Position: Winger

Team information
- Current team: Atlas
- Number: 13

Senior career*
| Years | Team | Apps | (Gls) |
| 2017–2020 | Atlas | 54 | (7) |
| 2020–2022 | Querétaro | 68 | (8) |
| 2023– | Atlas | 92 | (4) |

International career^{‡}
| 2022 | Mexico U-20 | | |
- * Club domestic league appearances and goals as of 6 February 2026 ‡ National team caps and goals as of 14 July 2023

Maritza Dardane Maldonado Velázquez (born 26 May 2002) is a Mexican professional footballer who plays as a Winger for Liga MX Femenil side Atlas.

== Career ==
Maldonado started her career in 2017 with Atlas. In 2020 she joined Querétaro. In 2023 she returned to Atlas.

== International career ==
Maldonado was also part of the team that participated in the 2022 FIFA U-20 Women's World Cup in Costa Rica.
