= Florianne Jourde =

Canadian soccer player (born 2004)

Personal information
- Date of birth: November 5, 2004 (age 22)
- Place of birth: Montréal, Québec, Canada
- Height: 1.64 m (5 ft 4 1/2 in)
- Position: Midfielder

Team information
- Current team: Paris Saint-Germain
- Number: 11

Youth career
- CS Boucaniers Montréal
- CS Monteuil
- PEF Québec

College career
Years	Team	Apps	(Gls)
2023–2024	USC Trojans	25	(3)

Senior career*
Years	Team	Apps	(Gls)
2021	CS Monteuil	4	(1)
2022	PEF Québec	5	(2)
2023	AS Laval	8	(5)
2025–	Paris Saint-Germain	19	(1)

International career^{‡}
2022–2024	Canada U20	21	(9)
2025–	Canada	2	(0)
- * Club domestic league appearances and goals as of October 12, 2026 ‡ National team caps and goals as of November 29, 2025

Florianne Jourde (born November 5, 2004) is a Canadian professional soccer player who plays as a midfielder for French Première Ligue club Paris Saint-Germain and the Canada national team.

== Early life ==
Jourde began playing youth soccer at age three with CS Boucaniers Montréal. She later played with CS Monteuil, before joining the PEF Québec program. In May 2023, she won a CF Montreal Academy scholarship bursary.

== College career ==
In 2023, Jourde began attending the University of Southern California, where she played for the women's soccer team. In 2024, she was named to the Big Ten All-Academic Team. After two seasons, she departed USC, giving up her remaining two years of college eligibility, in order to turn professional.

== Club career ==
In 2021, Jourde played with CS Monteuil in the Première ligue de soccer du Québec (later renamed Ligue1 Québec). In 2022, she played with PEF Québec. In 2023, she played with AS Laval (formerly CS Monteuil), scoring five goals in eight matches, although she missed part of the season, due to a call-up to the Canada U20 team.

In July 2025, Jourde signed with French Première Ligue club Paris Saint-Germain through June 2028. On September 6, 2025, she made her debut in a league match against Lens. On September 20, 2025, she scored her first goal in a 5-2 victory over Nantes.

== International career ==
In May 2019, she made her debut in the Canada Soccer program, attending a camp with the Canada U17 team.

In 2022, she was named to the Canada U20 for the 2022 CONCACAF Women's U-20 Championship, where she was named to the Tournament Best XI. She was later named to the team for the 2022 FIFA U-20 Women's World Cup, 2023 CONCACAF Women's U-20 Championship, and 2024 FIFA U-20 Women's World Cup. With the U20s, she served as team captain.

In October 2025, she was called up to the Canada senior team for the first time, for a pair of friendlies. She made her debut on October 24 against Switzerland.

== Career statistics ==
=== Club ===
As of December 22, 2024

Club	Season	League			National Cup		League Cup		Other		Total	
Club	Season	League	Apps	Goals	Apps	Goals	Apps	Goals	Apps	Goals	Apps	Goals
CS Monteuil	2021	Première ligue de soccer du Québec	4	1	—		—		0	0	4	1
PEF Québec	2022	Première ligue de soccer du Québec	5	2	—		—		—		5	2
AS Laval	2023	Ligue1 Québec	8	5	—		—		2	2	10	7
Career total			17	8	0	0	0	0	2	2	19	10

=== International ===
As of match played November 29, 2025

Appearances and goals by national team and year
National team	Year	Apps	Goals
Canada	2025	2	0
Total		2	0
