= Sheika Scott =

Costa Rican footballer (born 2006)

Personal information
- Full name: Sheika Daleicha Scott Richardson
- Date of birth: 22 October 2006 (age 20)
- Place of birth: Talamanca, Costa Rica
- Height: 1.66 m (5 ft 5 in)
- Positions: Attacking midfielder; forward

Team information
- Current team: Paris FC
- Number: 11

Senior career*
Years	Team	Apps	(Gls)
2021–2022	Municipal Pococí		
2022–2025	Alajuelense		
2025–	Paris FC	13	(2)

International career^{‡}
2022–	Costa Rica U-17	4	(3)
2022–	Costa Rica U-20	4	(1)
2022–	Costa Rica	3	(0)
- * Club domestic league appearances and goals ‡ National team caps and goals as of 00:56, 4 February 2020 (UTC)

Sheika Daleicha Scott Richardson (born 22 October 2006) is a Costa Rican footballer who plays for the Première Ligue club Paris FC and the Costa Rica women's national team. Scott can play as an attacking midfielder, as well as a forward.

== Club career ==
=== Municipal Pococi ===
On 8 August 2021, Scott became the youngest player to score in the Costa Rican Women's Premier Division, at just 14 years old.

=== Alajuelense ===
On 22 December 2022, Scott was signed by Alajuelense for a one-year contract. On 15 January 2023, she in played the Costa Rican Super Cup in her debut against Sporting F.C.. Scott entered at the 60th minute substituting for Shirley Cruz; Alajuelense would lose to Sporting in a penalty shootout by 1–3.

On 27 January 2023, Scott made her debut with the club on the first date of the 2023 Apertura season against Sporting F.C., a game that ended with a 1–1 draw. On 5 February, she faced Herediano on the second day of the season, at the 32nd minute, Scott scored her first goal with the red and black team, Alajuelense won the match 4–0.

=== Paris FC ===
On 16 June 2025, Scott's signing with Paris FC was made official, with a contract until June 2028.

== International career ==
On 4 November 2022, Scott was called up by Amelia Valverde to represent the Costa Rican team in two friendly matches. She made her debut with the senior team on 11 November, replacing Carolina Venegas in a friendly match against the Netherlands, in which they were defeated by the score of 4–0. Four days later, they faced Portugal, where Scott entered at the 62nd minute for Yerling Ovares, ending in a 1–0 defeat.

On 6 July 2023, Scott was called up to the 23-player squad to play the 2023 World Cup.

== International goals ==
No.	Date	Venue	Opponent	Score	Result	Competition
1	4 December 2023	SKNFA Technical Center, Basseterre, Saint Kitts and Nevis	Saint Kitts and Nevis	10–0	19–0	2024 CONCACAF W Gold Cup qualification
2	3 March 2026	Bermuda National Stadium, Bermuda	Bermuda	2–0	8–0	2026 CONCACAF W Championship qualification
3	3 March 2026	Bermuda National Stadium, Bermuda	Bermuda	7–0	8–0	2026 CONCACAF W Championship qualification
4	10 April 2026	Estadio Alejandro Morera Soto, Alajuela, Costa Rica	Cayman Islands	5–0	21–0	2026 CONCACAF W Championship qualification
5	10 April 2026	Estadio Alejandro Morera Soto, Alajuela, Costa Rica	Cayman Islands	11–0	21–0	2026 CONCACAF W Championship qualification
6	18 April 2026	Estadio Nacional, San José, Costa Rica	Guatemala	2–0	3–0	2026 CONCACAF W Championship qualification

== Honours ==
Alajuelense

- Primera División: Apertura 2023

Individual

- CONCACAF Women's U-20 Championship Golden Boot: 2023
