= Suriname women's national under-20 football team =

Women's national association football team representing Suriname

Suriname Women's U-20
- Association: Surinaamse Voetbal Bond
- Confederation: CONCACAF
- Head coach: ?
- Captain: Fabienne Karsoredjo
- FIFA code: SUR
First colours	Second colours

First international
- Guyana 0–7 Suriname (St. John's, Antigua & Barbuda; 17 January 2002)

Biggest win
- Guyana 0–7 Suriname (St. John's, Antigua & Barbuda; 19 January 2002)

Biggest defeat
- United States 14–0 Suriname (Santo Domingo, Dominican Republic; 4 March 2022)

CONCACAF Women's U-20 Championship
- Appearances: 4 (first in 2002)
- Best result: Quarter-finals (2022)

FIFA U-20 Women's World Cup
- Appearances: 0

The Suriname women's national U-20 football team is the national women's football team of Suriname and is overseen by the Surinaamse Voetbal Bond and its represents Suriname in international women's under 20 or youth women's football competitions.

== Players ==
- The following players were called up for 2022 CONCACAF Women's U-20 Championship.

No.	Pos.	Player	Date of birth (age)	Club
1	GK	Latifah Moedjijio	8 March 2004 (age 22)	(Surinamese Football Association)
7	DF	Xaviera Krimbo	13 September 2004 (age 22)	(Surinamese Football Association)
8	DF	Fabienne Karsoredjo	18 May 2004 (age 22)	(Surinamese Football Association)
10	MF	Chayenne Purperhat	29 June 2004 (age 22)	(Surinamese Football Association)
13	MF	Cady Chin See Chobg	12 March 2004 (age 22)	(Surinamese Football Association)
18	FW	Samanie Shanequa Loe-A-Foe	30 June 2004 (age 22)	(Surinamese Football Association)

== Fixtures and results ==
Legend

Win Draw Loss Fixture

== Competitive records ==
=== FIFA U-20 Women's World Cup ===
FIFA U-20 Women's World Cup record
Year	Round	Position	MP	W	D*	L	GF	GA
(Canada) 2002 to (Colombia) 2024	Did not qualify							
(Poland) 2026	To be determined							
Total	–	0/12	0	0	0	0	0	0

=== CONCACAF Women's U-20 Championship ===
CONCACAF Women's U-20 Championship record
Year	Result	Matches	Wins	Draws	Losses	GF	GA
(Trinidad and Tobago) 2002	Group stage	3	3	0	0	22	2
(Canada) 2004	Group stage	2	0	0	2	1	7
(Mexico) 2006	Group stage	6	3	1	2	13	9
(Mexico) 2008 to (Panama) 2020
(Dominican Republic) 2022	Quarter-finals	1	0	0	1	0	14
Total	4/11	12	6	2	5	36	32
