= Costa Rica women's national under-20 football team =

Costa Rica
- Nickname(s): La Sele (The Selection); La Tricolor (The Tricolor)
- Association: Costa Rican Football Federation
First colours	Second colours

CONCACAF U-20 Championship
- Appearances: 8 (first in 2002)
- Best result: Third place (2004, 2010, 2014)

FIFA U-20 Women's World Cup
- Appearances: 5 (first in 2010)
- Best result: Group stage (2010, 2014, 2022, 2024, 2026)

Costa Rica women's national under-20 football team represents Costa Rica in international youth football competitions.

== Fixtures and results ==
Legend

Win Draw Lose Fixture

=== 2022 ===
10 August 2022 2022 FIFA U-20 Women's World Cup GS	Costa Rica	1–3	Australia	San José, Costa Rica
20:00 CST (UTC–6)	Pinell 19'	Report (FIFA); Report (Soccerway)	Hunter 37' (pen.); Henry 38'; Fenton 72'	Stadium: Estadio Nacional de Costa Rica; Attendance: 22,506; Referee: Tess Olofsson (Sweden)

13 August 2022 2022 FIFA U-20 Women's World Cup GS	Costa Rica	0–5	Spain	San José, Costa Rica
20:00 CST (UTC–6)		Report (FIFA); Report (Soccerway)	Majarín 26'; Mingueza 33'; Gabarro 62' (pen.); Elexpuru 74'; Paralluelo 90+4'	Stadium: Estadio Nacional de Costa Rica; Attendance: 22,446; Referee: Emikar Calderas (Venezuela)

16 August 2022 2022 FIFA U-20 Women's World Cup GS	Brazil	5–0	Costa Rica	San José, Costa Rica
20:00 CST (UTC–6)	Rafa Levis 27', 53' (pen.); Pati Maldaner 63'; Aline 75'; Mileninha 88' (pen.)	Report (FIFA); Report (Soccerway)		Stadium: Estadio Nacional de Costa Rica; Attendance: 11,923; Referee: Lina Lehtovaara (Finland)

=== 2023 ===
15 April 2023 CONCACAF Women's U-20 Championship qualification GS	Costa Rica	13–0	Belize	Managua, Nicaragua
16:00	Scott 3', 45+2', 57'; Herrera 6', 14', 19', 32'; T. Fonseca 12', 28'; Briceño 42'; Dinarte 55'; V. Matarrita 71'; González 88'	Report		Stadium: Nicaragua National Football Stadium; Referee: Carly Shaw-MacLaren (Canada)

17 April 2023 CONCACAF Women's U-20 Championship qualification GS	Saint Lucia	0–9	Costa Rica	Managua, Nicaragua
19:00		Report	Herrera 5', 7', 13'; Scott 10' (pen.), 11'; Roper 43', 49'; V. Matarrita 82'; M. Matarrita 90+1'	Stadium: Nicaragua National Football Stadium; Referee: Mirian Leon (El Salvador)

21 April 2023 CONCACAF Women's U-20 Championship qualification GS	Nicaragua	1–2	Costa Rica	Managua, Nicaragua
19:00	Munguia 71'	Report	Scott 6'; Solano 32'	Stadium: Nicaragua National Football Stadium; Referee: Carly Shaw-MacLaren (Canada)

23 April 2023 CONCACAF Women's U-20 Championship qualification GS	Costa Rica	2–1	Guatemala	Managua, Nicaragua
16:00	V. Matarrita 75'; Solano 89'		Gonzalez 55'	Stadium: Nicaragua National Football Stadium

May 2023 CONCACAF Women's U-20 Championship GS	Costa Rica	v	Santo Domingo, Dominican Republic
			Stadium: Félix Sánchez Olympic Stadium

May 2023 CONCACAF Women's U-20 Championship GS	Costa Rica	v	Santo Domingo, Dominican Republic
			Stadium: Félix Sánchez Olympic Stadium

May 2023 CONCACAF Women's U-20 Championship GS	Costa Rica	v	Santo Domingo, Dominican Republic
			Stadium: Félix Sánchez Olympic Stadium

== Competitive record ==
=== FIFA U-20 Women's World Cup ===
Year	Result	GP	W	D	L	GS	GA	Squad
(Canada) 2002	Did not qualify							–
(Thailand) 2004	Did not qualify							–
(Russia) 2006	Did not qualify							–
(Chile) 2008	Did not qualify							–
(Germany) 2010	Group stage	3	0	0	3	2	9	Squad
(Japan) 2012	Did not qualify							–
(Canada) 2014	Group stage	3	0	0	3	2	10	Squad
(Papua New Guinea) 2016	Did not qualify							–
(France) 2018	Did not qualify							–
(Costa Rica) 2022	Group stage	3	0	0	3	1	13	Squad
(Colombia) 2024	Group stage	3	0	0	3	0	12	Squad
(Poland) 2026	Group stage	3	0	0	3	1	10	Squad
Total:5/12	Group stage	15	0	0	15	6	54	–

=== CONCACAF Women's U-20 Championship ===
CONCACAF Women's U-20 Championship record
Year	Round	Position	Pld	W	D	L	GF	GA
(Trinidad and Tobago) 2002	Group stage	3rd	3	2	0	1	9	15
(Canada) 2004	Third place	3rd	5	3	1	1	19	8
(Mexico) 2006	Did not qualify							
(Mexico) 2008	Fourth place	4th	5	2	1	2	8	13
(Guatemala) 2010	Third place	3rd	5	3	0	2	8	4
(Panama) 2012	Did not qualify							
(Cayman Islands) 2014	Third place	3rd	5	2	1	2	14	14
(Honduras) 2015	Did not qualify							
(Trinidad and Tobago) 2018	Group stage	5th	3	1	0	2	5	7
(Dominican Republic) 2020	Did not participate							
(Dominican Republic) 2022	Did not participate							
(Dominican Republic) 2023	Fourth place	4th	5	2	0	3	14	14
(Costa Rica) 2025	Semi-finals	–	4	1	1	2	9	8
Total	8/12	3rd	35	16	4	15	85	83

== See also ==
- Costa Rica women's national football team
- Costa Rica women's national under-17 football team

== Head-to-head record ==
The following table shows Costa Rica's head-to-head record in the FIFA U-20 Women's World Cup.

Opponent	Pld	W	D	L	GF	GA	GD	Win %
Argentina	1	0	0	1	0	1	−1	0.00
Australia	1	0	0	1	1	3	−2	0.00
Brazil	1	0	0	1	0	5	−5	0.00
Colombia	2	0	0	2	1	6	−5	0.00
France	2	0	0	2	1	7	−6	0.00
Germany	1	0	0	1	2	4	−2	0.00
Netherlands	1	0	0	1	0	2	−2	0.00
New Zealand	1	0	0	1	0	3	−3	0.00
North Korea	2	0	0	2	0	13	−13	0.00
Paraguay	1	0	0	1	1	2	−1	0.00
Portugal	1	0	0	1	0	3	−3	0.00
Spain	1	0	0	1	0	5	−5	0.00
Total	15	0	0	15	6	54	−48	0.00
