= CONCACAF Women's U-20 Championship =

- Organizer(s): CONCACAF
- Founded: 2002; 24 years ago
- Region: North America, Central America and the Caribbean
- Teams: 20
- Qualifier for: FIFA U-20 Women's World Cup
- Current champion(s): Canada (3rd title)
- Most championships: United States (7 titles)
- Website: CONCACAF
- 2025 CONCACAF Women's U-20 Championship

The CONCACAF Women's Under-20 Championship is an association football competition for women's national under-20 teams in the North America, Central America and Caribbean region. It serves as the qualification tournament for the FIFA U-20 Women's World Cup.

== Results ==
Year	Host	Final			Third place match		
Year	Host	Champions	Score	Runners-up	Third place	Score	Fourth place
2002; Details	Trinidad and Tobago	Mexico and United States were group winners.^{[A]}					
2004; Details	Canada	Canada	2–1 (a.e.t.)	United States	Costa Rica	4–3	Mexico
2006; Details	Mexico	United States	3–2	Canada	Mexico	4–1	Jamaica
2008; Details	Mexico	Canada	1–0	United States	Mexico	2–2 (a.e.t.); 3–2 (p)	Costa Rica
2010; Details	Guatemala	United States	1–0	Mexico	Costa Rica	1–0	Canada
2012; Details	Panama	United States	2–1	Canada	Mexico	5–0	Panama
2014; Details	Cayman Islands	United States	4–0	Mexico	Costa Rica	7–3 (a.e.t.)	Trinidad and Tobago
2015; Details	Honduras	United States	1–0	Canada	Mexico	2–0	Honduras
2018; Details	Trinidad and Tobago	Mexico	1–1 (a.e.t.); 4–2 (p)	United States	Haiti	1–0	Canada
2020; Details	Dominican Republic	United States	4–1	Mexico	Haiti and Dominican Republic		
2022; Details	Dominican Republic	United States	2–0	Mexico	Canada	2–0	Puerto Rico
2023; Details	Dominican Republic	Mexico	2–1	United States	Canada	5–3 (a.e.t.)	Costa Rica
2025; Details	Costa Rica	Canada	3–2 (a.e.t.)	Mexico	United States and Costa Rica		

^{A} There was no championship final in 2002; both the United States and Mexico qualified for the 2002 FIFA U-19 Women's World Championship as group winners.

== Winners by country ==
Team	Champions	Runners-up	Third place	Fourth place
United States	7 (2006, 2010, 2012, 2014, 2015, 2020, 2022)	4 (2004, 2008, 2018, 2023)	SF (2025)	
Canada	3 (2004, 2008, 2025)	3 (2006, 2012, 2015)	2 (2022, 2023)	2 (2010, 2018)
Mexico	2 (2018, 2023)	5 (2010, 2014, 2020, 2022, 2025)	4 (2006, 2008, 2012, 2015)	1 (2004)
Costa Rica			3 (2004, 2010, 2014)	2 (2008, 2023), SF (2025)
Haiti			1 (2018), SF (2020)	
Jamaica				1 (2006)
Panama				1 (2012)
Trinidad and Tobago				1 (2014)
Honduras				1 (2015)
Dominican Republic				SF (2020)
Puerto Rico				1 (2022)

*SF: Semifinalist (Losing semi-finalists when the match for third place was not held).

== Participating nations ==
Legend

- 1st – Champions
- 2nd – Runners-up
- 3rd – Third place
- 4th – Fourth place
- SF – Semi-finalist
- GW – Group winner and advance to World Cup
- QF – Quarterfinals
- GS – Group stage
- R16 – Round of 16
- Q – Qualified for upcoming tournament
- — Hosts
- -- – Did not qualify/enter

Team	(Trinidad and Tobago) 2002	(Canada) 2004	(Mexico) 2006	(Mexico) 2008	(Guatemala) 2010	(Panama) 2012	(Cayman Islands) 2014	(Honduras) 2015	(Trinidad and Tobago) 2018	(Dominican Republic) 2020	(Dominican Republic) 2022	(Dominican Republic) 2023	(Costa Rica) 2025	Part.
Barbados	--	--	--	--	--	--	--	--	--	R16	--	--	--	1
Bermuda	--	--	--	--	--	--	--	--	--	R16	R16	--	--	2
Canada	--	1st	2nd	1st	4th	2nd	--	2nd	4th	QF	3rd	3rd	1st	11
Cayman Islands	--	--	--	--	--	--	GS	--	--	R16	R16	--	--	3
Costa Rica	GS	3rd	--	4th	3rd	--	3rd	--	GS	--	--	4th	SF	8
Cuba	--	--	--	GS	GS	GS	--	--	--	R16	GS	--	--	5
Curaçao	--	--	--	--	--	--	--	--	--	--	R16	--	--	1
Dominican Republic	--	GS	--	--	--	--	--	--	--	SF	R16	GS	--	4
El Salvador	--	--	GS	--	--	--	--	--	--	R16	QF	--	--	3
Grenada	--	--	--	--	--	--	--	--	--	R16	--	--	--	1
Guatemala	--	--	--	--	GS	GS	GS	--	--	GS	QF	--	--	5
Guyana	--	--	--	--	--	--	--	--	--	QF	R16	--	GS	3
Haiti	GS	--	--	--	--	GS	--	GS	3rd	SF	QF	--	--	6
Honduras	--	--	--	--	--	--	GS	4th	--	GS	GS	--	--	4
Jamaica	GS	GS	4th	GS	GS	GS	GS	GS	GS	QF	R16	GS	--	12
Mexico	GW	4th	3rd	3rd	2nd	3rd	2nd	3rd	1st	2nd	2nd	1st	2nd	13
Nicaragua	--	--	--	GS	--	--	--	--	GS	GS	GS	--	GS	5
Panama	GS	GS	GS	--	--	4th	--	GS	--	--	QF	GS	GS	8
Puerto Rico	--	--	--	--	--	--	--	--	--	R16	4th	GS	GS	4
Saint Kitts and Nevis	--	--	--	--	--	--	--	--	--	GS	R16	--	--	2
Saint Lucia	--	--	--	--	--	--	--	--	--	R16	--	--	--	1
Suriname	GS	--	GS	--	--	--	--	--	--	--	R16	--	--	3
Trinidad and Tobago	GS	GS	GS	GS	GS	--	4th	GS	GS	QF	GS	--	--	10
United States	GW	2nd	1st	2nd	1st	1st	1st	1st	2nd	1st	1st	2nd	SF	13

== Awards ==
=== Golden Boot ===
The topscorers of the final tournaments were:

Year	Player	Goals
2002	(United States) Kelly Wilson	9
2004	(United States) Kerri Hanks	10
2006	(Mexico) Charlyn Corral	8
2008	(Jamaica) Shakira Duncan (United States) Michelle Enyeart (United States) Kelley O'Hara	6
2010	(United States) Sydney Leroux	6
2012	(Mexico) Natalia Gómez Junco	6
2014	(Mexico) Tanya Samarzich (United States) McKenzie Meehan	6
2015	(United States) Mallory Pugh	7
2018	(Canada) Jordyn Huitema	5
2020	(Haiti) Melchie Dumornay	14
2022	(United States) Michelle Cooper	8
2023	(Costa Rica) Sheika Scott	6
2025	(Mexico) Montserrat Saldívar	8

=== Golden Ball ===
Year	Player
2010	(United States) Sydney Leroux
2014	(United States) Rose Lavelle
2015	(United States) Mallory Pugh
2018	(Mexico) Miriam García
2020	(United States) Mia Fishel
2022	(United States) Michelle Cooper
2023	(Mexico) Alice Soto
2025	(Mexico) Montserrat Saldívar

=== Golden Glove ===
Year	Player
2014	(United States) Katelyn Rowland
2015	(United States) Rosemary Chandler
2018	(Mexico) Emily Alvarado
2020	(Mexico) Wendy Toledo
2022	(Canada) Anna Karpenko
2023	(Mexico) Itzel Velasco
2025	(Canada) Noelle Henning

=== CONCACAF Fair Play Award ===
Year	Player
2014	United States
2015	Canada
2018	Mexico
2020	Mexico
2022	Mexico
2023	United States
2025	Canada

== Results at the FIFA U-20 Women's World Cup ==
Legend

- 1st – Champions
- 2nd – Runners-up
- 3rd – Third place
- 4th – Fourth place
- QF = Quarter-finals
- R16 = Round of 16
- GS = Group stage
- Q = Qualified
- • – Did not qualify
- × – Did not enter / Withdrew / Banned
- – Hosts

World Cup	(Canada) 2002	(Thailand) 2004	(Russia) 2006	(Chile) 2008	(Germany) 2010	(Japan) 2012	(Canada) 2014	(Papua New Guinea) 2016	(France) 2018	(Costa Rica) 2022	(Colombia) 2024	(Poland) 2026	Total
Canada	2nd	QF	GS	GS	•	GS	QF	GS	•	GS	R16	Q	10
Costa Rica	•	•	•	•	GS	•	GS	•	•	GS	GS	Q	5
Haiti	•	•	•	•	•	•	•	•	GS	•	×	•	1
Mexico	GS	•	GS	GS	QF	QF	GS	QF	GS	QF	R16	Q	11
United States	1st	3rd	4th	1st	QF	1st	QF	4th	GS	GS	3rd	Q	12
Total	3	2	3	3	3	3	4	3	3	4	4	4	

== Winning coaches ==
Year	Team	Coach
2004	Canada	(Canada) Ian Bridge
2006	United States	(United States) Timothy Schulz
2008	Canada	(Canada) Bob Birarda
2010	United States	(England) Jill Ellis
2012	United States	(United States) Steve Swanson
2014	United States	(United States) Michelle French
2015	United States	(United States) Michelle French
2018	Mexico	(Mexico) Christopher Cuéllar
2020	United States	(England) Laura Harvey
2022	United States	(England) Tracey Kevins
2023	Mexico	(Mexico) Ana Galindo
2025	Canada	(Canada) Cindy Tye

== See also ==
- FIFA U-20 Women's World Cup
- CONCACAF Women's U-17 Championship
- CONCACAF Under-20 Championship
