= Molly Kehoe =

Caymanian footballer (born 2004)

Personal information
- Date of birth: August 10, 2004 (age 22)
- Position: Attacking midfielder

Team information
- Current team: Gwalia United
- Number: 14

Senior career*
Years	Team	Apps	(Gls)
2022	Sunset	11	(11)
2023-2025	Cardiff City	13	(10)
2025-2026	West Ham Albion		
2026-	Gwalia United	7	(5)

International career
2020	Cayman Islands	4	(4)
- * Club domestic league appearances and goals

Molly Kehoe (born August 10, 2004) is a Caymanian footballer who plays as a striker for Gwalia United.

== Early life ==
Kehoe attended Darlington School in the United States.

== Career ==
Kehoe played for Sunset FC in the Cayman Islands in 2022/2023, ending the season as joint top goalscorer. Kehoe played for Welsh side Cardiff City, where she was regarded as one of the club's most important players. On July 21, 2025, Kehoe officially completed her move to West Bromwich Albion F.C. Women.

On February 3, 2026, Kehoe officially completed her move to Gwalia United F.C.

== Style of play ==
Kehoe mainly operates as a striker and has been described as a "goal-scoring machine".

== Personal life ==
Kehoe has a brother, Tommy, who also currently lives in Cardiff and plays rugby.

== Career statistics ==
=== Club ===
Club	Season	Division	League		Cup		Continental		Total	
Club	Season	Division	Apps	Goals	Apps	Goals	Apps	Goals	Apps	Goals
Sunset	2022	Cayman Women's League	11	11	1	1			12	12
Cardiff City	2023-24	Adran Premier	8	9			1	0	9	9
Cardiff City	2024-25	Adran Premier	5	1			2	0	7	1
West Ham Albion	2025-26	National League North			2	2			2	2
Gwalia United	2025-26	National League South	1	1					1	1
Gwalia United	2026-27	National League South	6	4					6	4
Total career			31	26	3	3	3	0	37	29

=== International ===
Team	Years	Apps	Goals
Cayman Islands	2020	1	1
Cayman Islands	2023	1	1
Cayman Islands	2024	1	1
Cayman Islands	2026	1	1
Total		4	4
