= Jamaica women's national under-20 football team =

Women's under-20 national association football team representing Jamaica

Jamaica Women's U-20
- Nickname: Reggae Girlz
- Association: Jamaica Football Federation
- Sub-confederation: CFU (Caribbean)
- Head coach: (Jamaica) Xavier Gilbert
- Captain: Liya Brooks
- FIFA code: JAM
First colours	Second colours

First international
- Jamaica 21–0 Grenada (Kingston, Jamaica; 18 December 2002)

Biggest win
- Jamaica 21–0 Grenada (Kingston, Jamaica; 18 December 2002)

Biggest defeat
- Canada 7–0 Jamaica (San Pedro Sula, Honduras; 6 December 2015)

CONCACAF Women's U-20 Championship
- Appearances: 12 (first in 2002)
- Best result: Fourth-Place (2006)

FIFA U-20 Women's World Cup
- Appearances: DNQ

The Jamaica women's national under-20 football team, nicknamed the "Reggae Girlz", is a female football team at the age of U-20 which represent Jamaica in the international women's football. The team plays CONCACAF Women's U-20 Championship. The nation yet to qualified to the FIFA U-20 Women's World Cup.

== Team image ==
=== Nicknames ===
The Jamaica women's national under-20 football team has been known or nicknamed as "Reggae Girlz".

=== Home stadium ===
The team play its home matches on the Frome Sports Club and others stadiums.

== History ==
The Jamaica women's national under-20 football team of Jamaica at age of U-20. The team have played their first game against Grenada which won by 21–0 goals at Kingston Jamaica on 18 December 2002. The team have participated all the edition of CONCACAF Women's U-20 Championship and their best performance was fourth-place on 2006. The nation has not qualified to the FIFA U-20 Women's World Cup.

== Current squad ==
The following squad were named recently finished 2022 CONCACAF Women's U-20 Championship

As of 10 November 2022

No.	Pos.	Player	Date of birth (age)	Club
1	GK	Liya Brooks	17 May 2005 (aged 16)	(United States Soccer Federation) Hawaii Surf Soccer Club
3	GK	Serena Mensah	14 March 2002 (aged 19)	(United States Soccer Federation) Fordham Rams
13	GK	Javanae Jones	6 October 2002 (aged 19)	(Jamaica Football Federation) Reinas Academy
2	DF	Mia Mitchel	14 March 2005 (aged 16)	(United States Soccer Federation) Charlotte Soccer Academy
4	DF	Able Nevillegail	15 February 2002 (aged 20)	(United States Soccer Federation) Navarro College
5	DF	Anabel Moore	20 March 2003 (aged 18)	(Jamaica Football Federation) Yale University
6	DF	Malia Atkins (c)	3 February 2002 (aged 20)	(United States Soccer Federation) South Dakota Coyotes
11	DF	Davia Richards	10 February 2004 (aged 18)	(Jamaica Football Federation) Waterhouse FC
20	DF	Adrene Smith	26 November 2006 (aged 15)	(Jamaica Football Federation) UWI F.C.
7	MF	Shaneil Buckley	20 May 2005 (aged 16)	(Jamaica Football Federation) Waterhouse FC
9	MF	Kameron Simmonds	6 December 2003 (aged 18)	(Jamaica Football Federation) Richmond FC
10	MF	Peyton McNamara	22 February 2002 (aged 20)	(United States Soccer Federation) Ohio State Buckeyes
12	MF	Chantelle Parker	1 January 2002 (aged 20)	(United States Soccer Federation) Pittsburgh Panthers
14	MF	Shania Harris	19 July 2002 (aged 19)	(United States Soccer Federation) Daytona State College
15	MF	Alexia Wright		
17	MF	Zoe Vidaurre	16 March 2003 (aged 18)	(United States Soccer Federation) Bethesda ECNL
19	MF	Alexia Spencer	28 January 2002 (aged 20)	(United States Soccer Federation) Saint Leo Lions
8	FW	Christina Salmon	13 August 2002 (aged 19)	(United States Soccer Federation) Hill College
16	FW	Daihla Whyte	7 September 2003 (aged 18)	Unattached
18	FW	Theanna Burnett	18 September 2003 (aged 18)	(United States Soccer Federation) Gwinnett Soccer Academy

== Fixtures and results ==
Legend

Win Draw Loss Fixtures

== Competitive records ==
Champions Runners-up Third place Fourth place

=== FIFA U-20 Women's World Cup ===
FIFA U-20 Women's World Cup record
Year	Round	Position	MP	W	D*	L	GF	GA
(Canada) 2002 to (Colombia) 2024	Did not qualify							
(Poland) 2026	To be determined							
Total	–	0/12	0	0	0	0	0	0

=== CONCACAF Women's U-20 Championship ===
CONCACAF Women's U-20 Championship record
Year	Result	MP	W	D	L	GF	GA
(Trinidad and Tobago) 2002	Group stage	3	0	2	1	3	4
(Canada) 2004	Group stage	3	0	0	3	2	12
(Mexico) 2006	Fourth-Place	5	2	0	3	19	7
(Mexico) 2008	Group stage	3	1	0	2	8	6
(Guatemala) 2010	Group stage	3	0	0	3	0	9
(Panama) 2012	Group stage	3	0	1	2	1	5
(Cayman Islands) 2014	Group stage	3	0	2	1	1	4
(Honduras) 2015	Group stage	3	1	1	1	8	10
(Trinidad and Tobago) 2018	Group stage	3	0	1	2	3	8
(Dominican Republic) 2020	Quarter-finals	5	3	1	1	21	8
(Dominican Republic) 2022	Round of 16	4	1	1	2	3	4
(Dominican Republic) 2023	Group stage	3	1	0	2	4	9
Total	12/12	41	9	9	23	73	86
