= 2010 CONCACAF Women's U-20 Championship =

Tournament details
- Host country: Guatemala
- City: Guatemala City
- Dates: January 20–30
- Teams: 8 (from 1 confederation)
- Venue: 1 (in 1 host city)

Final positions
- Champions: United States (2nd title)
- Runners-up: Mexico
- Third place: Costa Rica
- Fourth place: Canada

Tournament statistics
- Matches played: 16
- Goals scored: 42 (2.63 per match)
- Attendance: 20,831 (1,302 per match)
- Top scorer: (United States) Sydney Leroux (6)
- Best player: (United States) Sydney Leroux

The 2010 CONCACAF Women's U-20 Championship was the fifth edition of the CONCACAF Women's U-20 Championship. The tournament was hosted by Guatemala, and all matches were played at the Estadio Cementos Progreso. The United States were the defending champions, having won the 2008 tournament, their second regional championship at the under-20 level. The top three sides at the 2010 tournament earned qualification to the 2010 FIFA U-20 Women's World Cup. The tournament was won by the United States, who defeated Mexico in the final, 1–0. Costa Rica secured the final qualification position by defeating Canada in the third place match, 1–0.

== Media coverage ==
CONCACAF broadcast every game on their official website, concacaf.com, in live stream. All games were also available in archive. In the United States, Fox Soccer Channel agreed to broadcast two of the group stage matches involving the United States, as well as both the semifinals. Also, Fox Sports en Español broadcast the final.

== Qualified teams ==
Region	Method of qualification	Teams
Caribbean; Caribbean Football Union (CFU)	2009 Caribbean Football Union; Women's Under-20 Tournament	Cuba; Jamaica; Trinidad and Tobago
Central America; Central American Football Union (UNCAF)	2009 UNCAF Women's; Under-20 Tournament	Costa Rica; Guatemala †
North America; North American Football Union (NAFU)	Automatic qualification	Canada; Mexico; United States

Notes:
† Automatically qualified as tournament hosts.

== Venues ==
2010 CONCACAF Women's U-20 Championship is located in Guatemala	Guatemala City
2010 CONCACAF Women's U-20 Championship is located in Guatemala	Estadio Cementos Progreso
2010 CONCACAF Women's U-20 Championship is located in Guatemala	Capacity: 16,000

== Group stage ==
=== Group A ===
Team	Pld	W	D	L	GF	GA	GD	Pts
Canada	3	3	0	0	6	1	+5	9
Costa Rica	3	2	0	1	6	2	+4	6
Guatemala	3	1	0	2	3	7	−4	3
Cuba	3	0	0	3	2	7	−5	0

January 20, 2010
15:00

Canada	1–0	Costa Rica
Leon 28'	Report

Estadio Cementos Progreso, Guatemala City
Attendance: 300
Referee: Dianne Ferreira-James (Guyana)
January 20, 2010
17:30

Guatemala	2–1	Cuba
Martínez 7', 45'	Report	Gallardo 61'

Estadio Cementos Progreso, Guatemala City
Attendance: 1,993
Referee: Shane de Silva (Trinidad and Tobago)

January 22, 2010
15:00

Cuba	0–2	Canada
	Report	Stewart 59'; Richardson 87'

Estadio Cementos Progreso, Guatemala City
Attendance: 3,453
Referee: Maria Cecibel Ortega (El Salvador)
January 22, 2010
17:30

Guatemala	0–3	Costa Rica
	Report	Ugalde 35'; Alvarado 39'; Rodríguez Cedeño 59'

Estadio Cementos Progreso, Guatemala City
Attendance: 3,453
Referee: Quetzalli Alvarado (Mexico)

January 24, 2010
11:00

Costa Rica	3–1	Cuba
Rodríguez Vasquez 18'; Cruz 43'; Aguilar 82'	Report	Gallardo 21'

Estadio Cementos Progreso, Guatemala City
Attendance: 1,918
Referee: Yesli Sarai Rivas (El Salvador)
January 24, 2010
13:30

Guatemala	1–3	Canada
Brooks 55'	Report	Leon 14'; Legault-Cordisco 26' (pen.); McCarthy 38'

Estadio Cementos Progreso, Guatemala City
Attendance: 1,918
Referee: Shane de Silva (Trinidad and Tobago)

=== Group B ===
Team	Pld	W	D	L	GF	GA	GD	Pts
United States	3	3	0	0	12	1	+11	9
Mexico	3	2	0	1	5	3	+2	6
Trinidad and Tobago	3	1	0	2	2	6	−4	3
Jamaica	3	0	0	3	0	9	−9	0

January 21, 2010
15:00

Trinidad and Tobago	1–2	Mexico
St. Louis 1'	Report	Godoy 45'; Lagunas 81'

Estadio Cementos Progreso, Guatemala City
Attendance: 393
Referee: Carol Chenard (Canada)
January 21, 2010
17:30

Jamaica	0–6	United States
	Report	Nairn 9', 71'; Leroux 25', 35'; Noyola 48'; McCarty 83'

Estadio Cementos Progreso, Guatemala City
Attendance: 393
Referee: Erika Vargas (Costa Rica)

January 23, 2010
15:00

Mexico	2–0	Jamaica
Corral 45'; Godoy 47'	Report

Estadio Cementos Progreso, Guatemala City
Attendance: 605
Referee: Gillian Martindale (Barbados)
January 23, 2010
17:30

Trinidad and Tobago	0–4	United States
	Report	Marlborough 4'; K. Mewis 22'; Leroux 36', 45'

Estadio Cementos Progreso, Guatemala City
Attendance: 605
Referee: Arlene Troya (Panama)

January 25, 2010
15:00

Jamaica	0–1	Trinidad and Tobago
	Report	Seaton 65'

Estadio Cementos Progreso, Guatemala City
Attendance: 962
Referee: Carol Chenard (Canada)
January 25, 2010
17:30

United States	2–1	Mexico
DiMartino 14'; Leroux 64'	Report	90+1' Garciamendez

Estadio Cementos Progreso, Guatemala City
Attendance: 962
Referee: Dianne Ferreira-James (Guyana)

== Knockout rounds ==
Semi-finals
January 28
United States	2
Costa Rica	1
January 28
Canada	0
Mexico (a.e.t.)	1

Final
January 30
United States	1
Mexico	0
Third place
January 30
Canada	0
Costa Rica	1

=== Semifinals ===
January 28, 2010
14:30

United States	2–1	Costa Rica
K. Mewis 60'; Noyola 71'	Report	Rodríguez Cedeño 77'

Estadio Cementos Progreso, Guatemala City
Attendance: 629
Referee: Arlene Troya (Panama)

January 28, 2010
17:30

Canada	0 – 1 (a.e.t.)	Mexico
	Report	Corral 104'

Estadio Cementos Progreso, Guatemala City
Attendance: 629
Referee: Shane de Silva (Trinidad and Tobago)

=== Third place match ===
January 30, 2010
14:30

Canada	0–1	Costa Rica
	Report	Alvarado 19'

Estadio Cementos Progreso, Guatemala City
Attendance: 1,309
Referee: Dianne Ferreira-James (Guyana)

=== Final ===
January 30, 2010
17:30

United States	1–0	Mexico
Leroux 86'	Report

Estadio Cementos Progreso, Guatemala City
Attendance: 1,309
Referee: Yesli Sarai Rivas (El Salvador)

== Awards ==
2010 CONCACAF Women's U-20 Championship winners

United States
Second title

== See also ==
- 2010 FIFA U-20 Women's World Cup
