= 2015 CONCACAF Women's U-20 Championship =

8th edition of the CONCACAF Women's U-20 Championship

Tournament details
- Host country: Honduras
- City: San Pedro Sula
- Dates: 3–13 December
- Teams: 8 (from 1 confederation)
- Venues: 2 (in 1 host city)

Final positions
- Champions: United States (5th title)
- Runners-up: Canada
- Third place: Mexico
- Fourth place: Honduras

Tournament statistics
- Matches played: 16
- Goals scored: 63 (3.94 per match)
- Top scorer: (United States) Mallory Pugh (7 goals)
- Best player: (United States) Mallory Pugh
- Best goalkeeper: (United States) Rosemary Chandler
- Fair play award: Canada

The 2015 CONCACAF Women's U-20 Championship was the 8th edition of the CONCACAF Women's U-20 Championship, the biennial international youth football championship organised by CONCACAF for the women's under-20 national teams of the North, Central American and Caribbean region. The tournament was hosted by Honduras and took place between 3–13 December 2015, as announced by CONCACAF on 7 May 2015. A total of eight teams played in the tournament.

Same as previous editions, the tournament acted as the CONCACAF qualifiers for the FIFA U-20 Women's World Cup. The top three teams qualified for the 2016 FIFA U-20 Women's World Cup in Papua New Guinea.

The United States won their fifth title overall and fourth in a row with a 1–0 final victory over Canada. Both finalists and third-placed Mexico qualified for the World Cup.

== Qualification ==
The eight berths were allocated to the three regional zones as follows:

- Three teams from the North American Zone (NAFU), i.e., Canada, Mexico and the United States, who all qualified automatically
- Two teams from the Central American Zone (UNCAF), including Honduras who qualified automatically as hosts
- Three teams from the Caribbean Zone (CFU)

Regional qualification tournaments were held to determine the four teams joining Canada, Mexico, the United States, and hosts Honduras at the final tournament.

=== Qualified teams ===
The following eight teams qualified for the final tournament.

Team	Qualification	Appearance	Previous best performances	Previous FIFA U-20 Women's World Cup appearances
North American Zone (NAFU)
Canada	Automatic	6th	Winner (2004, 2008)	6
Mexico	Automatic	8th	Runner-up (2010, 2014)	6
United States	Automatic	8th	Winner (2006, 2010, 2012, 2014)	7
Central American Zone (UNCAF) qualified through Central American qualifying competition
Honduras	Hosts	2nd	Group stage (2014)	0
Panama	Group winner	5th	Fourth place (2012)	0
Caribbean Zone (CFU) qualified through Caribbean qualifying competition
Haiti	Final round winner	3rd	Group stage (2002)	0
Jamaica	Final round runner-up	8th	Fourth place (2006)	0
Trinidad and Tobago	Final round 3rd place	7th	Fourth place (2014)	0

== Venues ==
The tournament was hosted in San Pedro Sula. In the original schedule, the Estadio Francisco Morazán would host the opening day matches for Group A, as well as the semifinals, third place match and the final, while the Estadio Olímpico Metropolitano would host the remaining Group A matches and all of the Group B matches. In the final schedule, eight group matches were relocated to the Escuela Internacional Sampedrana due to rain, while all matches initially scheduled for the Estadio Francisco Morazán was played at the Estadio Olímpico Metropolitano.

== Draw ==
The draw for the tournament took place on 4 November 2015 at 10:00 CST (UTC−6) at the Hotel Real Intercontinental in San Pedro Sula.

The eight teams were drawn into two groups of four teams. Tournament host Honduras were seeded in Group A, while defending CONCACAF Women's U-20 Championship champion United States were seeded in Group B.

Pot 1	Pot 2
Honduras (Position A1); United States (Position B1); Canada; Mexico	Panama; Haiti; Jamaica; Trinidad and Tobago

== Squads ==
Players born on or after 1 January 1996 were eligible to compete in the tournament. Each team could register a maximum of 20 players (two of whom must be goalkeepers).

== Group stage ==
The top two teams of each group advanced to the semi-finals. The teams were ranked according to points (3 points for a win, 1 point for a draw, 0 points for a loss). If tied on points, tiebreakers would be applied in the following order:

1. Goal difference in all group matches;
2. Greatest number of goals scored in all group matches;
3. Greatest number of points obtained in the group matches between the teams concerned;
4. Goal difference resulting from the group matches between the teams concerned;
5. Greater number of goals scored in all group matches between the teams concerned;
6. Drawing of lots.

All times were local, CST (UTC−6).

The two matches originally scheduled on 5 December 2015 (Jamaica vs Canada and Trinidad and Tobago vs Honduras) were postponed due to heavy rain. As a result, all subsequent group matches were delayed by a day and relocated to the Escuela Internacional Sampedrana in San Pedro Sula.

=== Group A ===
Pos	Team	Pld	W	D	L	GF	GA	GD	Pts	Qualification
1	Canada	3	3	0	0	11	0	+11	9	Knockout stage
2	Honduras (H)	3	1	1	1	4	4	0	4	Knockout stage
3	Jamaica	3	1	1	1	8	10	−2	4	
4	Trinidad and Tobago	3	0	0	3	1	10	−9	0	

Source: CONCACAF
(H) Hosts
3 December 2015
17:00

Canada	2–0	Trinidad and Tobago
Kinzner 16'; Loncar 81'	Report

Estadio Olímpico Metropolitano, San Pedro Sula
Referee: Alondra Arellano (Mexico)
3 December 2015
19:30

Honduras	2–2	Jamaica
Bahr 4', 43'	Report	Shaw 23' (pen.), 73'

Estadio Olímpico Metropolitano, San Pedro Sula
Referee: Ekaterina Koroleva (United States)

6 December 2015
10:00

Jamaica	0–7	Canada
	Report	Yekka 3'; Kinzner 21'; Flynn 27' (pen.); Pryce 50', 68', 80'; Kats 70'

Escuela Internacional Sampedrana, San Pedro Sula
Referee: Melissa Pérez (Panama)
6 December 2015
14:00

Trinidad and Tobago	0–2	Honduras
	Report	Romero 4'; Bahr 67'

Escuela Internacional Sampedrana, San Pedro Sula
Referee: Maurees Skeete (Guyana)

8 December 2015
10:00

Trinidad and Tobago	1–6	Jamaica
Leander 30'	Report	Shaw 8'; Nelson-Lawes 21', 34', 46', 86'; Hudson-Marks 55'

Escuela Internacional Sampedrana, San Pedro Sula
Referee: Maurees Skeete (Guyana)
8 December 2015
14:00

Honduras	0–2	Canada
	Report	Stratigakis 5', 16'

Escuela Internacional Sampedrana, San Pedro Sula
Referee: Alondra Arellano (Mexico)

=== Group B ===
Pos	Team	Pld	W	D	L	GF	GA	GD	Pts	Qualification
1	United States	3	2	1	0	14	3	+11	7	Knockout stage
2	Mexico	3	2	1	0	9	2	+7	7	Knockout stage
3	Haiti	3	1	0	2	3	13	−10	3	
4	Panama	3	0	0	3	3	11	−8	0	

Source: CONCACAF
4 December 2015
17:00

Haiti	3–2	Panama
Louis 19'; Mondésir 31' (pen.), 53'	Report	Riley 40'; Franco 64'

Estadio Olímpico Metropolitano, San Pedro Sula
Referee: Marie-Soleil Beaudoin (Canada)
4 December 2015
19:30

United States	2–2	Mexico
Pugh 20' (pen.); Fox 22'	Report (CONCACAF); Report (US Soccer)	Solis 32'; Palacios 66'

Estadio Olímpico Metropolitano, San Pedro Sula
Referee: Marianela Araya (Costa Rica)

7 December 2015
10:00

Mexico	5–0	Haiti
Martínez 12', 88'; Sánchez 31', 77'; Bernal 84' (pen.)	Report (CONCACAF); Report (FEMEXFUT)

Escuela Internacional Sampedrana, San Pedro Sula
Referee: Tatiana Guzmán (Nicaragua)
7 December 2015
14:00

Panama	1–6	United States
Gutiérrez 82'	Report	Hedge 8'; Pugh 11', 78'; Scarpa 42', 47', 90+3'

Escuela Internacional Sampedrana, San Pedro Sula
Referee: Gillian Martindale (Barbados)

9 December 2015
10:00

Panama	0–2	Mexico
	Report (CONCACAF); Report (FEMEXFUT)	Solis 40'; Crowther 41'

Escuela Internacional Sampedrana, San Pedro Sula
Referee: Karitza Guerra (Honduras)
9 December 2015
14:00

United States	6–0	Haiti
DeMelo 16'; Pugh 35', 44'; Scarpa 48'; Davidson 50'; Stevens 55'	Report

Escuela Internacional Sampedrana, San Pedro Sula
Referee: Cecile Hinds (Trinidad and Tobago)

== Knockout stage ==
In the knockout stage, extra time and penalty shoot-out would be used to decide the winner if necessary.

=== Bracket ===
Semi-finals
11 December – San Pedro Sula
Canada (p)	0 (5)
Mexico	0 (4)
11 December – San Pedro Sula
United States	7
Honduras	0

Final
13 December – San Pedro Sula
Canada	0
United States	1
Third place
13 December – San Pedro Sula
Mexico	2
Honduras	0

=== Semi-finals ===
Winners qualified for 2016 FIFA U-20 Women's World Cup.

11 December 2015
17:00

Canada	0–0 (a.e.t.)	Mexico
	Report (CONCACAF); Report (CanadaSoccer)
Penalties
St. Georges (penalty scored); Kats (penalty scored); Pryce (penalty scored); Richards (penalty scored); Pickett (penalty scored)	5–4	(penalty scored) Bernal; (penalty missed) Flores; (penalty scored) González; (penalty scored) Palacios; (penalty scored) Rodríguez

Estadio Olímpico Metropolitano, San Pedro Sula
Referee: Tatiana Guzmán (Nicaragua)

11 December 2015
20:00

United States	7–0	Honduras
Sanchez 33', 38'; Pugh 35', 60'; Scarpa 68'; Canales 88'; Velásquez 90+6' (o.g.)	Report

Estadio Olímpico Metropolitano, San Pedro Sula
Referee: Marianela Araya (Costa Rica)

=== Third place playoff ===
Winner qualified for 2016 FIFA U-20 Women's World Cup.

13 December 2015
15:00

Mexico	2–0	Honduras
Palacios 40'; Crowther 71'	Report (CONCACAF); Report (FEMEXFUT)

Estadio Olímpico Metropolitano, San Pedro Sula
Referee: Marie-Soleil Beaudoin (Canada)

=== Final ===
13 December 2015
18:00

Canada	0–1	United States
	Report	Sanchez 72'

Estadio Olímpico Metropolitano, San Pedro Sula
Referee: Gillian Martindale (Barbados)

== Winners ==
2015 CONCACAF Women's U-20 Championship

United States
Fifth title

== Qualified teams for FIFA U-20 Women's World Cup ==
The following three teams from CONCACAF qualified for the FIFA U-20 Women's World Cup.

Team	Qualified on	Previous appearances in tournament^{1}
United States	11 December 2015	7 (**2002**, 2004, 2006, **2008**, 2010, **2012**, 2014)
Canada	11 December 2015	6 (2002, 2004, 2006, 2008, 2012, 2014)
Mexico	13 December 2015	6 (2002, 2006, 2008, 2010, 2012, 2014)

^{1} Bold indicates champion for that year. Italic indicates host for that year.

== Goalscorers ==
7 goals

- (United States) Mallory Pugh

5 goals

- (United States) Jessie Scarpa

4 goals

- (Jamaica) Oshay Nelson-Lawes

3 goals

- (Canada) Taylor Pryce
- (Honduras) Elexa Bahr
- (Jamaica) Khadija Shaw
- (United States) Ashley Sanchez

2 goals

- (Canada) Sarah Kinzner
- (Canada) Sarah Stratigakis
- (Haiti) Nérilia Mondésir
- (Mexico) Jacqueline Crowther
- (Mexico) Katty Martínez
- (Mexico) Kiana Palacios
- (Mexico) Maria Sánchez
- (Mexico) Blanca Solis

1 goal

- (Canada) Shana Flynn
- (Canada) Vital Kats
- (Canada) Martina Loncar
- (Canada) Sura Yekka
- (Haiti) Batcheba Louis
- (Honduras) Fátima Romero
- (Jamaica) Chanel Hudson-Marks
- (Mexico) Rebeca Bernal
- (Panama) Yassiel Franco
- (Panama) Keisilyn Gutiérrez
- (Panama) Karla Riley
- (Trinidad and Tobago) Tsaianne Leander
- (United States) Marley Canales
- (United States) Tierna Davidson
- (United States) Savannah DeMelo
- (United States) Emily Fox
- (United States) Kelcie Hedge
- (United States) Ella Stevens

1 own goal

- (Honduras) Cherry Velásquez (playing against United States)

== Awards ==
The following awards were given at the conclusion of the tournament.

Golden Ball	Golden Boot	Golden Glove
(United States) Mallory Pugh	(United States) Mallory Pugh	(United States) Rosemary Chandler
CONCACAF Fair Play Award
Canada

Best XI

- Goalkeeper: (United States) Rosemary Chandler
- Right Defender: (United States) Emily Fox
- Central Defender: (Canada) Bianca St. Georges
- Central Defender: (United States) Natalie Jacobs
- Left Defender: (United States) Tierna Davidson
- Right Midfielder: (United States) Jessie Scarpa
- Central Midfielder: (Mexico) Kiana Palacios
- Central Midfielder: (United States) Savannah DeMelo
- Central Midfielder: (Canada) Sarah Stratigakis
- Left Midfielder: (United States) Ashley Sanchez
- Forward: (United States) Mallory Pugh
