= 2015 CONCACAF Women's U-20 Championship qualification =

The 2015 CONCACAF Women's U-20 Championship qualification was a women's under-20 football competition which decided the participating teams of the 2015 CONCACAF Women's U-20 Championship. Players born on or after 1 January 1996 were eligible to compete in the tournament.

A total of eight teams qualified to play in the final tournament, where the berths were allocated to the three regional zones as follows:

- Three teams from the North American Zone (NAFU), i.e., Canada, Mexico and the United States, who all qualified automatically
- Two teams from the Central American Zone (UNCAF), including Honduras who qualified automatically as hosts
- Three teams from the Caribbean Zone (CFU)

The top three teams of the final tournament qualified for the 2016 FIFA U-20 Women's World Cup in Papua New Guinea.

== Teams ==
A total of 23 CONCACAF member national teams entered the tournament. Among them, four teams qualified automatically for the final tournament, and 19 teams entered the regional qualifying competitions.

Zone	Teams entering	No. of teams
North American Zone (NAFU)	Canada (qualified automatically for final tournament); Mexico (qualified automatically for final tournament); United States (qualified automatically for final tournament)	3
Central American Zone (UNCAF)	Honduras (qualified automatically for final tournament); Costa Rica; El Salvador; Guatemala; Nicaragua; Panama	6
Caribbean Zone (CFU)	Anguilla; Antigua and Barbuda; Bermuda; Curaçao; Dominica; Dominican Republic; Grenada; Haiti; Jamaica; Puerto Rico; Saint Kitts and Nevis; Saint Lucia; Saint Vincent and the Grenadines; Trinidad and Tobago	14

Did not enter
North American Zone (NAFU)	None
Central American Zone (UNCAF)	Belize
Caribbean Zone (CFU)	Aruba; Bahamas; Barbados; Bonaire^{1}; British Virgin Islands; Cayman Islands; Cuba; French Guiana^{1}; Guadeloupe^{1}; Guyana; Martinique^{1}; Montserrat; Saint Martin^{1}; Sint Maarten^{1}; Suriname; Turks and Caicos Islands; U.S. Virgin Islands

Notes
^{1} Non-FIFA member, ineligible for World Cup.

== Central American Zone ==
2015 CONCACAF Women's U-20 Championship qualification (Central American Zone)
Eliminatoria Sub-20 Femenina de UNCAF 2015

Tournament details
- Host country: Panama
- Dates: 31 July – 8 August 2015
- Teams: 5 (from 1 sub-confederation)

Final positions
- Champions: Panama
- Runners-up: Costa Rica
- Third place: Guatemala
- Fourth place: Nicaragua

Tournament statistics
- Matches played: 10
- Goals scored: 36 (3.6 per match)
- Top scorer(s): (Costa Rica) Katherine Arroyo (Costa Rica) Melissa Herrera (4 goals each)

In the Central American Zone, initially six UNCAF member national teams entered the qualifying competition. They were divided into two groups of three teams, as drawn on 28 February 2015 at the UNCAF Executive Committee meeting in Managua, Nicaragua. Group A, consisting of Panama, Honduras and El Salvador, was to be played between 23 and 27 June 2015 in Panama, while Group B, consisting of Costa Rica, Nicaragua and Guatemala, was to be played between 1–5 July 2015 in Costa Rica. The two group winners would qualify for the final tournament as the UNCAF representatives.

However, after Honduras were named as hosts and qualified automatically, UNCAF changed the format of the qualifying competition. The five remaining teams were placed in a single group, as confirmed on 3 June 2015 by UNCAF. The matches were played between 31 July and 8 August 2015 in Panama. The winner qualified for the final tournament as the UNCAF representative besides hosts Honduras.

Times UTC−5.

=== Group ===
Pos	Team	Pld	W	D	L	GF	GA	GD	Pts	Qualification
1	Panama (H)	4	3	1	0	7	1	+6	10	2015 CONCACAF Women's U-20 Championship
2	Costa Rica	4	2	1	1	11	4	+7	7	
3	Guatemala	4	2	1	1	9	7	+2	7	
4	Nicaragua	4	0	2	2	4	13	−9	2	
5	El Salvador	4	0	1	3	5	11	−6	1	

Source: UNCAF
(H) Hosts
31 July 2015
16:30

Costa Rica	5–1	El Salvador
Arroyo 11', 75'; Villalobos 20'; Herrera 25', 41'	Report	Cerén 90+1'

Estadio Maracaná, Panama City
Referee: Karitza Guerra (Honduras)
31 July 2015
19:00

Panama	0–0	Nicaragua
	Report

Estadio Maracaná, Panama City

2 August 2015
15:30

Guatemala	1–1	Costa Rica
Ventura 79'	Report	Herrera 57'

Estadio Maracaná, Panama City
Referee: Melissa Borjas (Honduras)
2 August 2015
18:00

Panama	2–1	El Salvador
Franco 6', 50'	Report	Cerén 70'

Estadio Maracaná, Panama City

4 August 2015
16:30

El Salvador	1–2	Guatemala
Rodríguez 39'	Report	Herrera 71'; Gatica 79'

Estadio Maracaná, Panama City
4 August 2015
19:00

Nicaragua	0–5	Costa Rica
	Report	Arroyo 6', 34'; Herrera 10'; Coto 54'; Varela 72'

Estadio Maracaná, Panama City

6 August 2015
16:30

Guatemala	6–2	Nicaragua
Gatica 7', 54'; Rabanales 21'; González 32' ? 62'; Argueta 70'	Report	Y. Flores 28' ? 63'

Estadio Maracaná, Panama City
6 August 2015
19:00

Panama	2–0	Costa Rica
Riley 4'; Ortiz 69'	Report

Estadio Maracaná, Panama City

8 August 2015
15:30

El Salvador	2–2	Nicaragua
Jiménez 55'; Cerén 88'	Report	Melgar 34'; S. Flores 68'

Estadio Maracaná, Panama City
8 August 2015
18:00

Panama	3–0	Guatemala
Franco 46'; Cox 49', 90+2' (pen.)	Report

Estadio Maracaná, Panama City
Referee: Melissa Borjas (Honduras)

=== Goalscorers ===
4 goals

- (Costa Rica) Katherine Arroyo
- (Costa Rica) Melissa Herrera

3 goals

- (El Salvador) Brenda Cerén
- (Guatemala) Celeste Gatica
- (Panama) Yassiel Franco

2 goals

- (Panama) Marta Cox

1 goal

- (Costa Rica) María Paula Coto
- (Costa Rica) Sofía Varela
- (Costa Rica) Gloriana Villalobos
- (El Salvador) Heylin Jiménez
- (El Salvador) Karla Rodríguez
- (Guatemala) Alida Argueta
- (Guatemala) Fabiola González
- (Guatemala) Vivian Herrera
- (Guatemala) Amelia Rabanales
- (Guatemala) Madelin Ventura
- (Nicaragua) Sheyla Flores
- (Nicaragua) Yessenia Flores
- (Nicaragua) Jackeline Melgar
- (Panama) Solemar Ortiz
- (Panama) Karla Riley

Note: One goal each scored by Guatemala and Nicaragua missing goalscorer information.

== Caribbean Zone ==
2015 CONCACAF Women's U-20 Championship qualification (Caribbean Zone)
2015 CFU Women's Under-20 Qualifier

Tournament details
- Host countries: Puerto Rico (group 1); Saint Lucia (group 2); Dominican Republic (group 3); Saint Vincent and the Grenadines (group 4); Haiti (final round)
- Dates: 19 June – 23 October 2015
- Teams: 14 (from 1 sub-confederation)

Final positions
- Champions: Haiti
- Runners-up: Jamaica
- Third place: Trinidad and Tobago
- Fourth place: Puerto Rico

Tournament statistics
- Matches played: 27
- Goals scored: 101 (3.74 per match)
- Top scorer: (Jamaica) Khadija Shaw (7 goals)

In the Caribbean Zone, 14 CFU member national teams entered the qualifying competition. Among them, 13 teams entered the first round, where they were divided into one group of four teams and three groups of three teams. The groups were played between 19 and 23 June and 26–30 July 2015 and hosted by one of the teams in each group. The four group winners, the runner-up of the four-team group, and the two best runners-up of the three-team groups advanced to the final round to be joined by final round hosts Haiti.

In the final round, played between 14 and 23 October 2015 in Haiti, the eight teams were divided into two groups of four teams, where the top two teams of each group advanced to play a single-elimination tournament. The top three teams qualified for the final tournament as the CFU representatives.

Times UTC−4.

=== First round ===
==== Group 1 ====
Matches played in Puerto Rico.

Pos	Team	Pld	W	D	L	GF	GA	GD	Pts	Qualification
1	Puerto Rico (H)	3	3	0	0	16	1	+15	9	Final round
2	Curaçao	3	1	1	1	3	6	−3	4	Final round
3	Anguilla	3	0	2	1	1	9	−8	2	
4	Antigua and Barbuda	3	0	1	2	1	5	−4	1	

Source: CFU
(H) Hosts
19 June 2015
17:00

Anguilla	0–0	Antigua and Barbuda
	Report

Juan Ramón Loubriel Stadium, Bayamón
19 June 2015
19:30

Puerto Rico	5–0	Curaçao
Tirado 3'; Díaz 30'; Zaragoza 35'; Martínez 82', 90+2'	Report

Juan Ramón Loubriel Stadium, Bayamón

21 June 2015
17:00

Antigua and Barbuda	0–2	Curaçao
	Report	Hart 55'; Scheepers 60'

Juan Ramón Loubriel Stadium, Bayamón
21 June 2015
19:30

Puerto Rico	8–0	Anguilla
Martínez 9', 35', 76'; Tirado 19'; Díaz 52'; Aponte 79'; Torres 87'; Solís 90+2'	Report

Juan Ramón Loubriel Stadium, Bayamón

23 June 2015
16:00

Curaçao	1–1	Anguilla
Hart (?)	Report	Johnson (?)

Juan Ramón Loubriel Stadium, Bayamón
23 June 2015
18:30

Puerto Rico	3–1	Antigua and Barbuda
Guadalupe 11'; Tirado 35', 82'	Report	Browne 27'

Juan Ramón Loubriel Stadium, Bayamón

==== Group 2 ====
Matches played in Saint Lucia.

Pos	Team	Pld	W	D	L	GF	GA	GD	Pts	Qualification
1	Jamaica	1	1	0	0	5	0	+5	3	Final round
2	Grenada	2	1	0	1	4	7	−3	3	
3	Saint Lucia (H)	1	0	0	1	2	4	−2	0	

Source: CFU
(H) Hosts
26 July 2015
16:00

Grenada	0–5	Jamaica
	Report	Roberts 4'; Shaw 48', 58', 90+3'; Lee-Fatt 89'

Mindoo Phillip Park, Castries

28 July 2015
16:00

Saint Lucia	2–4	Grenada
Cox 10'; Lionel 78'	Report	Julien 17'; Frank 33', 38'; Prevost 90+4'

Mindoo Phillip Park, Castries

30 July 2015
16:00

Saint Lucia	Cancelled	Jamaica

Mindoo Phillip Park, Castries

The final match was postponed due to heavy rain. It was eventually not played, and Jamaica advanced to the final round.

==== Group 3 ====
Matches played in Dominican Republic.

Pos	Team	Pld	W	D	L	GF	GA	GD	Pts	Qualification
1	Bermuda	2	1	1	0	9	2	+7	4	Final round
2	Dominican Republic (H)	2	1	1	0	8	2	+6	4	Final round
3	Saint Kitts and Nevis	2	0	0	2	0	13	−13	0	

Source: CFU
(H) Hosts
26 July 2015
14:00

Bermuda	7–0	Saint Kitts and Nevis
Darrell 3'; Nolan 10', 13' (pen.), 55', 70'; Frazzoni 25', 45'	Report

Estadio Panamericano, San Cristóbal

28 July 2015
16:00

Dominican Republic	6–0	Saint Kitts and Nevis
Peralta 15', 43', 83'; Gunn 54', 71'; Sosa 86'	Report

Estadio Panamericano, San Cristóbal

30 July 2015
16:00

Dominican Republic	2–2	Bermuda
Peralta 64'; Sosa 80'		Nolan 24'; Burch 52'

Estadio Panamericano, San Cristóbal

==== Group 4 ====
Matches played in Saint Vincent and the Grenadines.

Pos	Team	Pld	W	D	L	GF	GA	GD	Pts	Qualification
1	Trinidad and Tobago	2	2	0	0	8	0	+8	6	Final round
2	Saint Vincent and the Grenadines (H)	2	1	0	1	3	3	0	3	Final round
3	Dominica	2	0	0	2	1	9	−8	0	

Source: CFU
(H) Hosts
26 July 2015
17:00

Saint Vincent and the Grenadines	0–2	Trinidad and Tobago
	Report	Leander 19', 60'

Victoria Park, Kingstown

28 July 2015
17:00

Trinidad and Tobago	6–0	Dominica
Matouk 15', 29'; Govia 21'; Ralph 40'; Carmichael 72'; Swift 81'	Report

Victoria Park, Kingstown

30 July 2015
17:00

Saint Vincent and the Grenadines	3–1	Dominica
T. Browne 31'; Duncan 39', 44'		Samuel (?)

Victoria Park, Kingstown

==== Ranking of second-placed teams ====
In addition to the runner-up of Group 1 (with four teams), the two best runners-up of Groups 2, 3 and 4 (with three teams) also advance to the final round.

Pos	Grp	Team	Pld	W	D	L	GF	GA	GD	Pts	Qualification
1	3	Dominican Republic	2	1	1	0	7	1	+6	4	Final round
2	4	Saint Vincent and the Grenadines	2	1	0	1	3	3	0	3	Final round
3	2	Grenada	2	1	0	1	4	5	−1	3	

Source: CFU

=== Final round ===
Matches played in Haiti.

==== Group A ====
Pos	Team	Pld	W	D	L	GF	GA	GD	Pts	Qualification
1	Haiti (H)	2	1	0	1	8	3	+5	3	Semi-finals
2	Puerto Rico	2	1	0	1	3	1	+2	3	Semi-finals
3	Bermuda	2	1	0	1	1	8	−7	3	
4	Dominican Republic	0	0	0	0	0	0	0	0	Withdrew

Source: CFU
(H) Hosts
14 October 2015
18:30

Bermuda	1–0	Puerto Rico
Nolan 29'	Report

Stade Sylvio Cator, Port-au-Prince

16 October 2015
18:00

Haiti	0–3	Puerto Rico
	Report	López 24'; Zaragoza 78'; Martínez 90+1'

Stade Sylvio Cator, Port-au-Prince

18 October 2015
18:00

Haiti	8–0	Bermuda
Destinvil 10'; Mondésir 33', 38', 81'; Éloissaint 44', 85'; Chandler 78'; Radamaker 90+1'	Report

Stade Sylvio Cator, Port-au-Prince

==== Group B ====
Pos	Team	Pld	W	D	L	GF	GA	GD	Pts	Qualification
1	Jamaica	3	2	1	0	8	3	+5	7	Semi-finals
2	Trinidad and Tobago	3	1	2	0	7	4	+3	5	Semi-finals
3	Curaçao	3	1	0	2	2	6	−4	3	
4	Saint Vincent and the Grenadines	3	0	1	2	2	6	−4	1	

Source: CFU
15 October 2015
16:00

Jamaica	4–1	Saint Vincent and the Grenadines
Shaw 15', 45+1' (pen.), 52'; Roberts 70'	Report	Plummer 29' (o.g.)

Stade Sylvio Cator, Port-au-Prince
15 October 2015
18:30

Trinidad and Tobago	4–1	Curaçao
Leander 37', 48'; Matouk 52'; Johnson 53'	Report	Wahr 2'

Stade Sylvio Cator, Port-au-Prince

17 October 2015
16:00

Saint Vincent and the Grenadines	1–1	Trinidad and Tobago
C. Browne 32'	Report	Henry 21'

Stade Sylvio Cator, Port-au-Prince
17 October 2015
18:30

Jamaica	2–0	Curaçao
Blackwood 51', 62'	Report

Stade Sylvio Cator, Port-au-Prince

19 October 2015
16:00

Curaçao	1–0	Saint Vincent and the Grenadines
Keller 68'	Report

Stade Sylvio Cator, Port-au-Prince
19 October 2015
18:30

Trinidad and Tobago	2–2	Jamaica
Thomas 64'; John 76'	Report	Shaw 34'; Gordon 39'

Stade Sylvio Cator, Port-au-Prince

==== Semi-finals ====
Winners qualified for 2015 CONCACAF Women's U-20 Championship.

21 October 2015
16:00

Jamaica	2–1	Puerto Rico
Wark 3'; Blackwood 64'	Report	Carrión 83'

Stade Sylvio Cator, Port-au-Prince
21 October 2015
18:30

Haiti	2–0	Trinidad and Tobago
Chandler 35'; Mondésir 51'	Report

Stade Sylvio Cator, Port-au-Prince

==== Third place playoff ====
Winner qualified for 2015 CONCACAF Women's U-20 Championship.

23 October 2015
15:30

Puerto Rico	1–1 (a.e.t.)	Trinidad and Tobago
Font 6' (pen.)	Report	John 24'
Penalties
	3–4

Stade Sylvio Cator, Port-au-Prince

==== Final ====
23 October 2015
18:30

Jamaica	0–2	Haiti
	Report	Louis 19'; Destinvil 61'

Stade Sylvio Cator, Port-au-Prince

=== Goalscorers ===
7 goals

- (Jamaica) Khadija Shaw

6 goals

- (Bermuda) Aaliyah Nolan
- (Puerto Rico) Marjorie Martínez

4 goals

- (Dominican Republic) Winibian Peralta
- (Haiti) Nérilia Mondésir
- (Puerto Rico) Adriana Tirado
- (Trinidad and Tobago) Tsaianne Leander

3 goals

- (Jamaica) Deneisha Blackwood
- (Trinidad and Tobago) Maya Matouk

2 goals

- (Bermuda) Eva Frazzoni
- (Curaçao) Lindsay Hart
- (Dominican Republic) Amalie Gunn
- (Dominican Republic) Emeli Sosa
- (Grenada) Roneisha Frank
- (Haiti) Sabine Chandler
- (Haiti) Kensia Destinvil
- (Haiti) Roseline Éloissaint
- (Jamaica) Rasha Roberts
- (Puerto Rico) Ángela Díaz
- (Puerto Rico) Mirianée Zaragoza
- (Saint Vincent and the Grenadines) Darie-Ann Duncan
- (Trinidad and Tobago) Chevonne John

1 goal

- (Anguilla) Coleen Johnson
- (Antigua and Barbuda) Jaidene Browne
- (Bermuda) Kshalea Burch
- (Bermuda) Deshae Darrell
- (Curaçao) Juvainy Keller
- (Curaçao) Diante Scheepers
- (Curaçao) Ketsiah Wahr
- (Dominica) Kasika Samuel
- (Grenada) Kristal Julien
- (Grenada) Shaunasha Prevost
- (Haiti) Batcheba Louis
- (Haiti) Darline Radamaker
- (Jamaica) Rena Gordon
- (Jamaica) Asia Lee-Fatt
- (Jamaica) Simone Wark
- (Puerto Rico) Karla Aponte
- (Puerto Rico) Alejandra Carrión
- (Puerto Rico) Adriana Font
- (Puerto Rico) Ilandra Guadalupe
- (Puerto Rico) Mariana López
- (Puerto Rico) Gabriela Solís
- (Puerto Rico) Jessica Torres
- (Saint Lucia) Criselda Cox
- (Saint Lucia) Lyla Lionel
- (Saint Vincent and the Grenadines) Chrislyn Browne
- (Saint Vincent and the Grenadines) Teffie-Ann Browne
- (Trinidad and Tobago) Corel Carmichael
- (Trinidad and Tobago) Shauna-Lee Govia
- (Trinidad and Tobago) Kelsey Henry
- (Trinidad and Tobago) Kedie Johnson
- (Trinidad and Tobago) Chelcy Ralph
- (Trinidad and Tobago) Zoe Swift
- (Trinidad and Tobago) Celeste Thomas

Own goal

- (Jamaica) Konya Plummer (playing against Saint Vincent and the Grenadines)

== Qualified teams ==
The following eight teams qualified for the final tournament.

Team	Qualified as	Qualified on	Previous appearances in tournament^{1}
Canada	Automatic qualifier	N/A	5 (**2004**, 2006, **2008**, 2010, 2012)
Mexico	Automatic qualifier	N/A	7 (2002, 2004, 2006, 2008, 2010, 2012, 2014)
United States	Automatic qualifier	N/A	7 (2002, 2004, **2006**, 2008, **2010**, **2012**, **2014**)
Honduras	Hosts	7 May 2015	1 (2014)
Panama	Central American Zone 1st place	8 August 2015	4 (2002, 2004, 2006, 2012)
Haiti	Caribbean Zone 1st place	21 October 2015	2 (2002, 2012)
Jamaica	Caribbean Zone 2nd place	21 October 2015	7 (2002, 2004, 2006, 2008, 2010, 2012, 2014)
Trinidad and Tobago	Caribbean Zone 3rd place	23 October 2015	6 (2002, 2004, 2006, 2008, 2010, 2014)

^{1} Bold indicates champion for that year. Italic indicates host for that year.
