= 2020 Washington Spirit season =

Washington Spirit
2020 season
- Head coach: Richie Burke
- Stadium: Maryland SoccerPlex; Audi Field; Segra Field
- NWSL: 2nd
- NWSL playoffs: Cancelled
- Challenge Cup: Quarterfinals
- Top goalscorer: League: 4 Tied (1); All: 4 Tied (1)
- Highest home attendance: 0 (closed door)
- Lowest home attendance: 0 (closed door)
- Average home league attendance: 0 (closed door)
Home colors	Away colors

The 2020 season was the Washington Spirit's seventh season, competing in the National Women's Soccer League, the top division of women's soccer in the United States.

The season was slated to begin on April 18, 2020 but was postponed due to the COVID-19 pandemic. Ultimately, the NWSL season was cancelled due to the pandemic. Th club participated in the NWSL Challenge Cup and the NWSL Fall series which were held in lieu of the regular season. The Challenge Cup was held behind closed doors at the neutral venue of Zions Bank Stadium in Herriman, Utah. The Spirit reached the Quarterfinals of the Challenge Cup and finished in third place in the Fall Series. Combined across all matches, the Spirit had the second best record of matches played during the 2020 season.

== Club ==
=== Roster ===
The first-team roster of Washington Spirit. Note: Flags indicate national team as defined under FIFA eligibility rules; some limited exceptions apply. Players may hold more than one non-FIFA nationality.

No.	Pos.	Nation	Player
1	GK	USA	Aubrey Bledsoe
2	FW	USA	Ashley Sanchez
3	DF	USA	Sam Staab
4	MF	USA	Natalie Jacobs
5	DF	USA	Brooke Hendrix
6	FW	USA	Katie McClure
7	MF	USA	Jaye Boissierre
8	MF	USA	Megan Dougherty Howard
9	DF	USA	Tegan McGrady
10	MF	USA	Rose Lavelle (FP)
11	MF	USA	Jordan DiBiasi
12	MF	USA	Andi Sullivan
13	FW	USA	Bayley Feist

No.	Pos.	Nation	Player
14	DF	USA	Paige Nielsen
16	MF	USA	Averie Collins
17	FW	JPN	Kumi Yokoyama (INT)
18	FW	USA	Jessie Scarpa
19	DF	USA	Dorian Bailey
20	FW	JAM	Cheyna Matthews
21	GK	USA	Katie Lund
22	FW	CAN	Jenna Hellstrom (INT)
23	MF	USA	Tori Huster
24	FW	USA	Kaiya McCullogh
31	FW	USA	Crystal Thomas
33	FW	USA	Ashley Hatch

- (FP) = Federation player
- (INT) = International roster player

=== Team management ===
As of March 1, 2020

Coaching staff
Head Coach	(England) Richie Burke
Player/Opponent Analyst	(United States) Tom Torres
High Performance Coach	(United States) Michael Minthorne
Goalkeeper Coach	(England) Ian McCaldon
Team Performance Coach	(Germany) Christian Cziommer
Reserve Team Head Coach	(United States) Kati Jo Spisak
Athletic Trainer	(United States) Julie Beveridge

== Competitions ==
=== Preseason ===
All preseason competitions were cancelled on March 12, 2020 due to the COVID-19 pandemic in the United States.

=== Regular season ===
==== Results summary ====
Overall								Home						Away					
Pld	W	D	L	GF	GA	GD	Pts	W	D	L	GF	GA	GD	W	D	L	GF	GA	GD
0	0	0	0	0	0	0	0	0	0	0	0	0	0	0	0	0	0	0	0

Last updated: March 1, 2020.
Source: NWSLsoccer.com

==== Results by round ====
Round	1	2	3	4	5	6	7	8	9	10	11	12	13	14	15	16	17	18	19	20	21	22	23	24
Ground	H	H	A	H	A	A	H	A	A	H	A	H	A	H	H	A	H	A	H	H	A	A	H	A
Result																								
Position																								

Updated to match(es) played on March 1, 2020. Source: NWSLsoccer.com
A = Away; H = Home; W = Win; D = Draw; L = Loss

=== NWSL Challenge Cup ===
==== Standings ====
Pos	Team	Pld	W	D	L	GF	GA	GD	Pts
1	North Carolina Courage	4	4	0	0	7	1	+6	12
2	Washington Spirit	4	2	1	1	4	4	0	7
3	OL Reign	4	1	2	1	1	2	−1	5
4	Houston Dash	4	1	1	2	5	6	−1	4
5	Utah Royals FC (H)	4	1	1	2	4	5	−1	4

Source: NWSL
Rules for classification: Tiebreakers
(H) Host

==== Results by round ====
Round	1	2	3	4
Ground	N	N	N	N
Result	W	L	D	W
Position	2	4	5	2

Updated to match(es) played on July 2, 2020. Source: NWSLsoccer.com
A = Away; H = Home; N = Neutral; W = Win; D = Draw; L = Loss

==== Preliminary round ====
June 27, 2020 1	Chicago Red Stars	1–2	Washington Spirit	Herriman, Utah
20:00	Gautrat 51'	Report	Lavelle 8'; Hatch 46'	Stadium: Zions Bank Stadium; Attendance: 0 (closed door)

July 1, 2020 2	Washington Spirit	0–2	North Carolina Courage	Herriman, Utah
20:00		Report	L. Williams 50', 61'	Stadium: Zions Bank Stadium; Attendance: 0 (closed door)

July 5, 2020 3	Portland Thorns FC	1–1	Washington Spirit	Herriman, Utah
20:00	Horan 69'	Report	Staab 77'	Stadium: Zions Bank Stadium; Attendance: 0 (closed door)

July 12, 2020 4	Washington Spirit	1–0	Houston Dash	Herriman, Utah
10:30	Feist 16'	Report	Naughton (yellow card) 13'; Schmidt (yellow card) 45+2'	Stadium: Zions Bank Stadium; Attendance: 0 (closed door)

==== Knockout round ====
July 17, 2020 Quarterfinals	Washington Spirit	0–0 (a.e.t.) (3–4 p)	Sky Blue	Herriman, Utah
		Report	Johnson (yellow card) 18'; Viens (yellow card) 90+2'	Stadium: Zions Bank Stadium; Attendance: 0 (closed door)
	Penalties
	Lavelle (penalty scored); Hatch (penalty scored); Staab (penalty missed); Thomas (penalty scored); Feist (penalty missed)		(penalty scored) Woldmoe; (penalty scored) Kawasumi; (penalty missed) Richardson; (penalty scored) Zerboni; (penalty scored) Eddy

=== NWSL Fall series ===
The Spirit were placed into the Northeast pod of the NWSL Fall series with the Chicago Red Stars and Sky Blue FC. The spirit played each team twice, once home and once away. Home Matches were hosted at Segra field without spectators.

==== Standings ====
Pos	Team	Pld	W	D	L	GF	GA	GD	Pts	Qualification
1	Portland Thorns FC (C)	4	3	1	0	10	3	+7	10	Community Shield
2	Houston Dash	4	3	0	1	12	7	+5	9	Runners-up
3	Washington Spirit	4	2	1	1	5	4	+1	7	Third place
4	Sky Blue FC	4	2	0	2	6	7	−1	6	
5	North Carolina Courage	4	1	2	1	8	10	−2	5	
6	Chicago Red Stars	4	1	1	2	7	7	0	4	
7	OL Reign	4	1	1	2	6	8	−2	4	
8	Orlando Pride	4	0	2	2	5	8	−3	2	
9	Utah Royals FC	4	0	2	2	3	8	−5	2	

Source: NWSL
Rules for classification: Tiebreakers
(C) Champions

September 5, 2020 NWSL Fall Series	Washington Spirit	1–2	Sky Blue	Leesburg, Virginia
1:00 PM EDT	Hendrix (yellow card) 41'; Neilsen 89'	Report	Onumonu 18'; Purce 90+2'	Stadium: Segra Field; Attendance: 0 (Closed Door); Referee: Danielle Chesky

September 12, 2020 NWSL Fall Series	Washington Spirit	2–1	Chicago Red Stars	Leesburg, Virginia
12:00 PM EDT	Howard (yellow card) 28'; Bailey (yellow card) 47'; Feist 71'; Scapa 90+3'	Report	Luebbert 26'; McCaskill (yellow card) 27' (yellow-red card) 42'	Stadium: Segra Field; Attendance: 0 (Closed Door); Referee: Joshua Encarnacion

September 26, 2020 NWSL Fall Series	Chicago Red Stars	1–1	Washington Spirit	Bridgeview, Illinois
1:00 PM EDT	McCaskill 72'	Report	McClure (yellow card) 30'; Hellstrom (yellow card) 63'; Thomas 88'	Stadium: SeatGeek Stadium; Attendance: 0 (Closed Door); Referee: Tori Penso

October 3, 2020 NWSL Fall Series	Sky Blue	0–1	Washington Spirit	Montclair, New Jersey
12:30 PM EDT	Richardson (yellow card) 56'; Cudjoe (yellow card) 82'	Report	Yokoyama 50'; Hellstrom (yellow card) 54'; Howard (yellow card) 90+1'	Stadium: MSU Soccer Park at Pittser Field; Attendance: 0 (Closed Door); Referee: Joshua Encarnacion

== Transfers ==
=== In ===
Date	Player	Number	Position	Previous club	Fee/notes
December 17, 2019	(United States) Jessie Scarpa	18	FW	(United States) North Carolina Tar Heels	Signed
December 17, 2019	(Canada) Jenna Hellstrom	22	FW	(Sweden) KIF Örebro DFF	Signed
December 18, 2019	(Japan) Kumi Yokoyama	17	FW	(Japan) AC Nagano Parceiro	Signed
January 4, 2020	(United States) Brooke Hendrix	5	DF	(England) West Ham United	Signed
January 7, 2020	(United States) Jaye Boissiere	7	MF	(France) Le Havre AC	Signed
February 10, 2020	(United States) Ashley Sanchez	2	FW	(United States) UCLA Bruins	Signed
February 10, 2020	(United States) Natalie Jacobs	4	MF	(United States) USC Trojans	Signed Draft Pick
February 10, 2020	(United States) Averie Collins	16	MF	(United States) Washington State Cougars	Signed Draft Pick
February 10, 2020	(United States) Katie McClure	6	FW	(United States) Kansas Jayhawks	Signed Draft Pick
February 10, 2020	(United States) Kaiya McCullogh	24	MF	(United States) UCLA Bruins	Signed Draft Pick
February 10, 2020	(United States) Katie Lund	21	GK	(United States) Arkansas Razorbacks	Signed, Undrafted

=== Out ===
Date	Player	Number	Position	New club	Fee/notes
November 4, 2019	(United States) Arielle Ship	2	FW	(United States) Utah Royals FC	Place on Re-Entry Wire
November 4, 2019	(United States) Megan Crosson	5	DF	(United States) Houston Dash	Place on Re-Entry Wire
November 4, 2019	(Australia) Chloe Logarzo	6	MF	(England) Bristol City	Place on Re-Entry Wire
November 4, 2019	(Australia) Amy Harrison	7	MF	(Australia) Western Sydney Wanders	Place on Re-Entry Wire
November 4, 2019	(United States) Tiffany McCarty	16	FW		Place on Re-Entry Wire
November 4, 2019	(United States) Cali Farquharson	17	FW	(Sweden) KIF Örebro DFF	Place on Re-Entry Wire
November 4, 2019	(United States) McKenzie Berryhill	18	DF		Place on Re-Entry Wire
November 4, 2019	(Australia) Elise Kellond-Knight	28	MF	(Australia) Brisbane Roar	Place on Re-Entry Wire
November 4, 2019	(United States) Shea Yanez	30	GK	(Spain) Santa Teresa	Place on Re-Entry Wire
January 16, 2020	(United States) Mallory Pugh	11	FW	(United States) Sky Blue FC	Trade for 4th, 13th, and 17th overall 2020 draft picks; 1st Round 2021 dract pick
	(United States) Mallory Eubanks	22	FW		

=== Draft picks ===
Draft picks are not automatically signed to the team roster. Only those who are signed to a contract will be listed as transfers in. Only trades involving draft picks and executed during the 2020 NWSL College Draft will be listed in the notes.

Player	Pos	Previous club	Notes	Ref
(United States) Ashley Sanchez	FW	(United States) UCLA Bruins	Round 1, Pick 4 (4th overall)	
(United States) Natalie Jacobs	MF	(United States) USC Trojans	Round 2, Pick 4 (13th overall)	
(United States) Averie Collins	MF	(United States) Washington State Cougars	Round 2, Pick 8 (17th overall)	
(United States) Katie McClure	FW	(United States) Kansas Jayhawks	Round 3, Pick 5 (23rd overall)	
(United States) Kaiya McCullough	FW	(United States) UCLA Bruins	Round 4, Pick 5 (32nd overall)	
