= 2013 CONCACAF Women's U-17 Championship =

2013 CONCACAF Under-17 Women's Championship
Tournament details
- Host country: Jamaica
- Dates: 30 October – 9 November
- Teams: 8 (from 1 confederation)
- Venue: 1 (in 1 host city)

Final positions
- Champions: Mexico (1st title)
- Runners-up: Canada
- Third place: United States
- Fourth place: Jamaica

Tournament statistics
- Matches played: 16
- Goals scored: 75 (4.69 per match)
- Top scorer(s): (Canada) Marie-Mychèle Métivier (6 goals)
- Best player: (Canada) Jessie Fleming
- Best goalkeeper: (Canada) Rylee Foster

The 2013 CONCACAF Under-17 Women's Championship is the fourth edition of the U-17 women's championship in football for the CONCACAF region. The tournament was hosted by Jamaica from 30 October to 9 November 2013. The United States were the defending champions. All matches were played in Montego Bay.

The two finalists, alongside hosts Costa Rica, qualify for the 2014 FIFA U-17 Women's World Cup.

== Qualified teams ==
The qualification process for the 2014 tournament started on 25 June 2013.

Region	Method of qualification	Teams
Caribbean; Caribbean Football Union (CFU)	2013 CFU tournament	Trinidad and Tobago; Haiti
Central America; Central American Football Union (UNCAF)	2013 UNCAF tournament	El Salvador; Guatemala
North America; North American Football Union (NAFU)	Automatic qualification	Canada; Mexico; United States
Host nation		Jamaica

== Group stage ==
All times are local (UTC-05:00).

Tie-breaking criteria

Teams were ranked on the following criteria:

1. Greater number of points obtained in all group matches.
2. Goal difference in all group matches.
3. Greater number of goals scored in all group matches.
4. Greater number of points obtained in group matches between the teams concerned.
5. Drawing of lots.

=== Group A ===
Pos	Team	Pld	W	D	L	GF	GA	GD	Pts	Qualification
1	Jamaica (H)	3	2	1	0	6	1	+5	7	Qualify to knockout stage
2	Mexico	3	1	2	0	9	2	+7	5	Qualify to knockout stage
3	El Salvador	3	1	0	2	1	9	−8	3	
4	Haiti	3	0	1	2	1	5	−4	1	

Source: CONCACAF
Rules for classification: Tiebreakers
(H) Hosts
30 October 2013
15:30

Mexico	1–1	Haiti
Flores 63'	Report (CONCACAF); Report (MedioTiempo)	Louis 43'

Montego Bay Sports Complex, Montego Bay
Referee: Christine Unkel
30 October 2013
18:00

Jamaica	2–0	El Salvador
Lee-Fat 45+3', 53'	Report

Montego Bay Sports Complex, Montego Bay
Referee: Sheena Dickson

1 November 2013
15:30

El Salvador	0–7	Mexico
	Report (CONCACAF); Report (FEMEXFUT)	Garcia 15', 56'; Cruz 20'; J. González 27', 54', 59'; Huerta 33'

Montego Bay Sports Complex, Montego Bay
Referee: Annia Navarrete
1 November 2013
18:00

Jamaica	3–0	Haiti
Lee-Fattt 9'; Johnson 53', 62'	Report

Montego Bay Sports Complex, Montego Bay
Referee: Charles Kirton

3 November 2013
15:30

Haiti	0–1	El Salvador
	Report	Alvayero 89'

Montego Bay Sports Complex, Montego Bay
Referee: Garcia
3 November 2013
18:00

Jamaica	1–1	Mexico
Davidson 45+1'	Report (CONCACAF); Report (FEMEXFUT)	Cuevas 9'

Montego Bay Sports Complex, Montego Bay

=== Group B ===
Pos	Team	Pld	W	D	L	GF	GA	GD	Pts	Qualification
1	United States	3	3	0	0	17	0	+17	9	Qualify to knockout stage
2	Canada	3	2	0	1	19	2	+17	6	Qualify to knockout stage
3	Guatemala	3	1	0	2	7	15	−8	3	
4	Trinidad and Tobago	3	0	0	3	0	26	−26	0	

Source: CONCACAF
Rules for classification: Tiebreakers
31 October 2013
15:30

Canada	8–0	Guatemala
Métivier 9', 40'; Borgmann 26'; Fleming 56'; Levasseur 58', 88'; Gill 80', 86'	Report

Montego Bay Sports Complex, Montego Bay
31 October 2013
18:00

Trinidad and Tobago	0–8	United States
	Report	Pugh 31', 80'; Rodriguez 37'; Canales 41'; Haley 51'; Kuhlmann 76'; Morse 81'; Jacobs 88'

Montego Bay Sports Complex, Montego Bay

2 November 2013
15:30

Canada	11–0	Trinidad and Tobago
Métivier 7', 21', 54'; Borgmann 14', 45', 59'; Fleming 36'; Levasseur 41', 42'; Gill 77', 80'	Report

Montego Bay Sports Complex, Montego Bay
2 November 2013
18:00

United States	7–0	Guatemala
Redei 21', 32', 36', 49'; Bailey 85' (pen.); Carreiro 89' (pen.); Hedge 90+1'	Report

Montego Bay Sports Complex, Montego Bay

4 November 2013
15:30

Guatemala	7–0	Trinidad and Tobago
Ventura 17', 74', 75'; Castellanos 25'; Barrios 56'; Solorzano 67'; Markwith 90'	Report

Montego Bay Sports Complex, Montego Bay
4 November 2013
18:00

United States	2–0	Canada
Redei 36'; Pugh 62'	Report

Montego Bay Sports Complex, Montego Bay

== Knockout stage ==
In the knockout stage, if a match is level at the end of normal playing time, penalty shoot-out is used to determine the winner (no extra time is played).

The winners of the two semifinal matches qualify for the 2014 FIFA U-17 Women's World Cup held in Costa Rica.

Semi-finals
7 November – Montego Bay
United States	1 (2)
Mexico (p)	1 (4)
7 November – Montego Bay
Jamaica	0
Canada	5

Final
9 November – Montego Bay
Mexico (p)	0 (4)
Canada	0 (2)
Third place
9 November – Montego Bay
United States	8
Jamaica	0

=== Semi-finals ===
7 November
15:00

United States	1–1	Mexico
Haley 27'	Report; Report (SoccerAmerica)	Woodall 5'
Penalties
Racioppi (penalty missed); McGrady (penalty scored); Pugh (penalty scored); Morse (penalty missed)	2–4	(penalty scored) Bernal; (penalty scored) E. González; (penalty scored) García; (penalty scored) Tovar

Montego Bay Sports Complex, Montego Bay

7 November
18:00

Jamaica	0–5	Canada
	Report	Métivier 4'; Borgmann 27'; Fleming 30'; Kinzner 48'; Levasseur 70'

Montego Bay Sports Complex, Montego Bay

=== Third place match ===
9 November
15:00

United States	8–0	Jamaica
Otto 3' 40'; Haley 13' 53'; Pugh 25' 26'; Canales 84'; Kuhlmann 90'	Report

Montego Bay Sports Complex, Montego Bay

=== Final ===
9 November
18:00

Mexico	0–0	Canada
	Report
Penalties
Bernal (penalty scored); E. González (penalty scored); García (penalty scored); Villalobos (penalty missed); Cruz (penalty scored)	4–2	(penalty missed) Dhaliwal; (penalty scored) Kinzer; (penalty missed) Levasseur; (penalty scored) Stratigakis

Montego Bay Sports Complex, Montego Bay

== Winners ==
2013 CONCACAF Women's U-17 Championship

Mexico
First title

== Awards ==
Golden Ball	Golden Boot	Golden Glove
(Canada) Jessie Fleming	(Canada) Marie-Mychèle Métivier	(Canada) Rylee Foster
