= Anguilla women's national football team =

Sports team in the Caribbean British Overseas Territory

Anguilla
- Association: Anguilla Football Association
- Confederation: CONCACAF (North America)
- Sub-confederation: CFU (Caribbean)
- Head coach: Ben Gooden
- Top scorer: Carlia Johnson (17)
- Home stadium: Raymond E. Guishard Technical Centre
- FIFA code: AIA
First colours	Second colours

FIFA ranking
- Current: 192 (16 June 2026)
- Highest: 175 (March 2022)
- Lowest: 193 (December 2025)

First international
- Antigua and Barbuda 1–0 Anguilla (St. John's, Antigua and Barbuda; 28 August 2004)

Biggest win
- Anguilla 7–0 Sint Maarten (The Valley, Anguilla; 28 July 2023)

Biggest defeat
- Anguilla 0–11 Mexico (The Valley, Anguilla; 9 April 2022)

Anguilla women's national football team is the national team of Anguilla, a British Overseas Territory in the Caribbean, and is controlled by the Anguilla Football Association. It is affiliated to the Caribbean Football Union of CONCACAF. As of November 2015, it remains unranked on the FIFA Women's World Rankings.

== History ==
In 2003, Anguilla did play four matches but these were not FIFA recognised. The team played six matches in 2004, two of which were FIFA recognised. The country's first FIFA recognised matched was played on Saturday, 28 August 2004 in a game played in St. John's against Antigua and Barbuda women's national football team, with Antigua and Barbuda winning 1–0. They played their second FIFA recognised match one day later in the same city with Anguilla pulling off a 1–0 victory. In 2005, the national team played in 10 matches, none of which were FIFA recognised. In 2006, the team played 0 games at a time when the team had four training sessions a week. The following year, they again failed to play a single FIFA recognised match. In 2008, they participated in two FIFA recognised matches, with both games being played in August in St. Croix, US Virgin Islands. In the first match on 29 August, they tied the US Virgin Islands 2–2 after being behind 0–1 at the half. They won the second match against the US Virgin Islands 1–0 on 31 August. The team did not play a FIFA recognised match in 2009.

=== 2010 CONCACAF Gold Cup ===
Anguilla entered in the Caribbean qualifiers for the 2010 Gold Cup, held in Mexico during 28 October–8 November 2010. The team was drawn along with Barbados and Grenada. The first game (as away team) was in Barbados National Stadium and finished with an 0–3 loss to Barbados. Again in Barbados National Stadium, Anguilla faced Grenada, and the result was a 2–0 victory. Despite this result, Anguilla didn't qualify to the next stage because the only place from Group E was occupied by Barbados, who won both of its matches. With this result, Anguilla was also eliminated from the 2011 World Cup, celebrated in Germany.

Team	Pld	W	D	L	GF	GA	GD	Pts
Barbados	2	2	0	0	7	0	+7	6
Anguilla	2	1	0	1	2	3	−1	3
Grenada	2	0	0	2	0	6	−6	0

=== 2014 CONCACAF Gold Cup ===
Anguilla's selected rivals for the qualifiers of the 2014 Caribbean Cup (qualifying tournament for the 2014 Gold Cup) were Jamaica, Dominican Republic and Saint Lucia in the Group 5. Anguilla withdrew before the start of the competition due to the outbreak of Chikungunya virus. This means that Anguilla's last match to the date was on 30 March 2010 against Grenada for the 2010 qualifiers.

Pos	Team	Pld	W	D	L	GF	GA	GD	Pts	Qualification
1	Jamaica	2	2	0	0	21	0	+21	6	Final round
2	Dominican Republic (H)	2	1	0	1	7	7	0	3	
3	Saint Lucia	2	0	0	2	0	21	−21	0	
4	Anguilla	0	0	0	0	0	0	0	0	Withdrew

Source: CFU
(H) Hosts

== Home stadium ==
The Anguilla women's national football team plays their home matches on the Ronald Webster Park.

== Results and fixtures ==
The following is a list of match results in the last 12 months, as well as any future matches that have been scheduled.

Legend

Win Draw Lose Void or postponed Fixture

=== 2025 ===
22 November 2025 Friendly match	Saint Kitts and Nevis	3–2	Anguilla	Basseterre, Saint Kitts and Nevis
15:00	TBA		Carlia Johnson; Coleen Johnson	Stadium: National Bank Group Technical Center

23 November 2025 Friendly match	Saint Kitts and Nevis	1-1	Anguilla	Basseterre, Saint Kitts and Nevis
04:11				Stadium: National Bank Group Technical Center

28 November 2025 CONCACAF W Championship qualification	Anguilla	1-3	Suriname	The Valley, Anguilla
	Ca. Johnson 90+1'	Report (FIFA); Report (CONCACAF)	Pereira 7'; van Netten 45', 75'	Stadium: Raymond E. Guishard Technical Centre; Referee: Marianela Araya (Costa Rica)

== Players ==
=== Current squad ===
- The following players were named to the squad for the 2026 CONCACAF W Championship qualification matches in November 2025.

No.	Pos.	Player	Date of birth (age)	Caps	Goals	Club
	GK	Adaiah Linton				(Anguilla Football Association)
	DF	Carlia Johnson				(Anguilla Football Association)
	DF	Cassilda Thomas				(Anguilla Football Association)
	DF	Coleen Johnson				(Anguilla Football Association)
	DF	Keanna Vanterpool				(Anguilla Football Association)
	DF	Shadwa Richardson				(Anguilla Football Association)
	MF	Jackeedah Bryan				(Anguilla Football Association)
	MF	Cycoiah Wattley				(Anguilla Football Association)
	MF	Zeila Harrigan				(Anguilla Football Association)
	FW	Camile Gumbs				(Anguilla Football Association)
	FW	Tyneeka Woodley				(Anguilla Football Association)
		Chevonique Da Souza				(Anguilla Football Association)
		Joden Henry				(Anguilla Football Association)
		Kaylee Durand				(Anguilla Football Association)
		Keronique Harrigan				(Anguilla Football Association)
		Lakaysha Marcelle				(Anguilla Football Association)
		Lerencia Ruan				(Anguilla Football Association)
		Makeisha Connor				(Anguilla Football Association)
		Nahla Ipinson Connor				(Anguilla Football Association)
		Reba Stott				(Anguilla Football Association)
		Reynah Lico				(Anguilla Football Association)
		Roneisha Hodge				(Anguilla Football Association)
		Taheera Johnson				(Anguilla Football Association)

=== Recent call ups ===
- The following players have been called up to the squad within the last 12 months.*

Pos.	Player	Date of birth (age)	Caps	Goals	Club	Latest call-up
	Adaiah Linton				(Anguilla)	v. Saint Kitts and Nevis,23 November 2025
	Camile Gumbs				(Anguilla)	v. Saint Kitts and Nevis,23 November 2025
	Carlia Johnson				(Anguilla)	v. Saint Kitts and Nevis,23 November 2025
	Chevonique Da Souza				(Anguilla)	v. Saint Kitts and Nevis,23 November 2025
	Coleen Johnson				(Anguilla)	v. Saint Kitts and Nevis,23 November 2025
	Jackeedah Bryan				(Anguilla)	v. Saint Kitts and Nevis,23 November 2025
	Joden Henry				(Anguilla)	v. Saint Kitts and Nevis,23 November 2025
	Kaylee Durand				(Anguilla)	v. Saint Kitts and Nevis,23 November 2025
	Keanna Vanterpool				(Anguilla)	v. Saint Kitts and Nevis,23 November 2025
	Keronique Harrigan				(Anguilla)	v. Saint Kitts and Nevis,23 November 2025
	Lakaysha Marcelle				(Anguilla)	v. Saint Kitts and Nevis,23 November 2025
	Lerencia Ruan				(Anguilla)	v. Saint Kitts and Nevis,23 November 2025
	Makeisha Connor				(Anguilla)	v. Saint Kitts and Nevis,23 November 2025
	Nahla Ipinson Connor				(Anguilla)	v. Saint Kitts and Nevis,23 November 2025
	Reynah Lico				(Anguilla)	v. Saint Kitts and Nevis,23 November 2025
	Roneisha Hodge				(Anguilla)	v. Saint Kitts and Nevis,23 November 2025
	Shadwa Richardson				(Anguilla)	v. Saint Kitts and Nevis,23 November 2025
	Taheera Johnson				(Anguilla)	v. Saint Kitts and Nevis,23 November 2025
	Tyneeka Woodley				(Anguilla)	v. Saint Kitts and Nevis,23 November 2025
	Zeila Harrigan				(Anguilla)	v. Saint Kitts and Nevis,23 November 2025

== Head-to-head record ==
As of 28 August 2021

Against	Played	Won	Drawn	Lost	GF	GA	GD	% Won
Antigua and Barbuda	2	1	0	1	1	1	0	50%
Barbados	1	0	0	1	0	3	−3	0%
Grenada	1	1	0	0	2	0	+2	50%
U.S. Virgin Islands	2	1	1	0	3	2	+1	60%
Total	6	3	1	2	6	6	0	65%

== Coaching staff ==
=== Manager history ===
- (Anguilla) Colin Johnson (2004–2019)
- (Anguilla) Keturah Caines (2019–2021)
- (Trinidad and Tobago) Ahkeela Mollon (2021–2022)
- (England) Ben Gooden (2023–)

== Competitive record ==
=== FIFA Women's World Cup ===
FIFA Women's World Cup record
Year	Result	GP	W	D*	L	GF	GA
(China) 1991	Did not enter						
(Sweden) 1995	Did not enter						
(United States) 1999	Did not enter						
(United States) 2003	Did not enter						
(China) 2007	Did not enter						
(Germany) 2011	Did not qualify						
(Canada) 2015	Withdrew						
(France) 2019	Did not qualify						
(Australia) (New Zealand) 2023	Did not qualify						
(Brazil) 2027	Did not qualify						
(Costa Rica) (Jamaica) (Mexico) (United States) 2031	To be determined						
(United Kingdom) 2035	To be determined						
Total	0/12	-	-	-	-	-	-

=== CONCACAF W Championship ===
CONCACAF W Championship record								Qualification record					
Year	Result	GP	W	D*	L	GF	GA	GP	W	D*	L	GF	GA
(Haiti) 1991	Did not enter							Did not enter					
(United States) 1993	Did not enter							Did not enter					
(Canada) 1994	Did not enter							Did not enter					
(Canada) 1998	Did not enter							Did not enter					
(United States) 2000	Did not enter							Did not enter					
(United States) (Canada) 2002	Did not enter							Did not enter					
(United States) 2006	Did not enter							Did not enter					
(Mexico) 2010	Did not qualify							2	1	0	1	2	3
(United States) 2014	Withdrew							Withdrew					
(United States) 2018	Did not qualify							4	0	0	4	1	19
(Mexico) 2022	Did not qualify							4	0	0	4	0	26
(United States) 2026	Did not qualify							4	0	0	4	1	18
Total	0/10	-	-	-	-	-	-	14	1	0	13	4	66

=== CONCACAF W Gold Cup ===
CONCACAF W Gold Cup record								Qualification record							
Year	Result	GP	W	D*	L	GF	GA	Division	Group	GP	W	D*	L	GF	GA
(United States) 2024	Did not qualify							C	D	4	1	1	2	8	13
(N/A) 2029	To be determined							To be determined							
Total	–	–	–	–	–	–	–	–	–	4	1	1	2	8	13

*Draws include knockout matches decided on penalty kicks.

=== CFU Women's Caribbean Cup/Challenge Series ===
CFU Women's Caribbean Cup/Challenge Series record
Year	Result	GP	W	D*	L	GF	GA	GD
(Saint Lucia) 2000	Did not enter							
(Trinidad and Tobago) 2014	Withdrew							
2018	Did not enter							
Total	0/3	-	-	-	-	-	-	-

*Draws include knockout matches decided on penalty kicks.

== See also ==
- Sport in Anguilla
  - Football in Anguilla
    - Women's football in Anguilla
- Anguilla women's national under-20 football team
- Anguilla women's national under-17 football team
- Anguilla men's national football team
