= Aaliyah Nolan =

Bermudian association football player

Personal information
- Date of birth: 12 June 1997 (age 29)
- Place of birth: Bermuda
- Height: 1.57 m (5 ft 2 in)
- Positions: Forward; midfielder

Team information
- Current team: Bradford City AFC Women
- Number: 48

College career
Years	Team	Apps	(Gls)
2015–2016	Navarro Bulldogs	28	(31)
2017–2018	North Texas Mean Green	42	(17)

Senior career*
Years	Team	Apps	(Gls)
2018–2020	PHC Zebras		
2020–	Leeds United	1+	(0+)

International career^{‡}
2013	Bermuda U17	1+	(2+)
2015	Bermuda U20	3+	(6)
2013–	Bermuda	6	(3)
Medal record
Women's football
Representing Bermuda
Island Games
Winner	2013 Bermuda
- * Club domestic league appearances and goals as of 9 November 2018. ‡ National team caps and goals as of 14 May 2025.

Aaliyah Nolan (born 12 June 1997) is a Bermudian footballer who plays as a forward and a midfielder for English FA Women's National League club Leeds United WFC and the Bermuda women's national team.

== Early life ==
Nolan was raised in Warwick. She also lived in St. George's. She was 11 when she was introduced to football by her father and brother. At 12, she participated at the 2009 Central American and Caribbean Age Group Championships in Athletics in the outdoor youth athletics pentathlon.

== College career ==
Nolan attended the Navarro College and the University of North Texas in the United States. She scored 23 goals for the former in 2016.

== Club career ==
On 27 November 2018, Nolan joined PHC Zebras in Bermuda. On 10 September 2020, it was known she had moved to England to play for Leeds United. Her signing was officially announced by the English club on 18 September. She made her FA Women's Premier League Division One debut two days later in a 1–2 away loss to Norton & Stockton Ancients. She has played for Leeds United since then.

== International career ==
Nolan represented Bermuda at the 2013 CONCACAF Women's U-17 Championship qualification and the 2015 CONCACAF Women's U-20 Championship qualification. She capped at senior level during the 2013 Island Games, the 2014 CFU Women's Caribbean Cup and the 2022 CONCACAF W Championship qualification.

== Career statistics ==
=== International goals ===
Key (expand for notes on "international goals" and sorting)
Location	Geographic location of the venue where the competition occurred Sorted by country name first, then by city name
Lineup	Start – played entire match on minute (off player) – substituted on at the minute indicated, and player was substituted off at the same time off minute (on player) – substituted off at the minute indicated, and player was substituted on at the same time (c) – captain Sorted by minutes played
#	NumberOfGoals.goalNumber scored by the player in the match (alternate notation to Goal in match)
Min	The minute in the match the goal was scored. For list that include caps, blank indicates played in the match but did not score a goal.
Assist/pass	The ball was passed by the player, which assisted in scoring the goal. This column depends on the availability and source of this information.
penalty or pk	Goal scored on penalty-kick which was awarded due to foul by opponent. (Goals scored in penalty-shoot-out, at the end of a tied match after extra-time, are not included.)
Score	The match score after the goal was scored. Sorted by goal difference, then by goal scored by the player's team
Result	The final score. Sorted by goal difference in the match, then by goal difference in penalty-shoot-out if it is taken, followed by goal scored by the player's team in the match, then by goal scored in the penalty-shoot-out. For matches with identical final scores, match ending in extra-time without penalty-shoot-out is a tougher match, therefore precede matches that ended in regulation
aet	The score at the end of extra-time; the match was tied at the end of 90' regulation
pso	Penalty-shoot-out score shown in parentheses; the match was tied at the end of extra-time
	Green background color – exhibition or closed door international friendly match
	Yellow background color – match at an invitational tournament
	Red background color – Olympic women's football qualification match
	Blue background color – FIFA women's world cup final tournament
NOTE: some keys may not apply for a particular football player

Goal	Date	Location	Opponent	Lineup	#	Min	Score	Result	Competition
1	23 May 2014	Providenciales, Turks and Caicos Islands	Turks and Caicos Islands	?	1.1	54	4–0	5–0	2014 CFU Women's Caribbean Cup

== Honours ==
=== International ===
Bermuda

- Island Games: 2013

== See also ==
- List of Bermuda women's international footballers
