= Oshay Nelson-Lawes =

Canadian-born Jamaican footballer (born 1996)

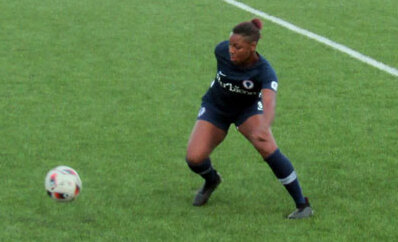
- Lawes playing with Oakville Blue Devils in 2019

Personal information
- Full name: Oshay Keyona Nelson-Lawes
- Date of birth: 27 June 1996 (age 30)
- Place of birth: Charlemagne, Quebec, Canada
- Height: 1.68 m (5 ft 6 in)
- Position: Forward

College career
Years	Team	Apps	(Gls)
2016	Tyler Apaches	24	(20)
2019	Ryerson Rams	4	(0)

Senior career*
Years	Team	Apps	(Gls)
2015–2017	North Mississauga SC	17+	(7+)
2018–2019	Oakville Blue Devils	8	(5)
2021	Woodbridge Strikers	3	(0)
2022	ProStars FC	7	(1)
2026–	North Mississauga SC B	1	(0)

International career^{‡}
2012	Jamaica U17	3	(0)
2015	Jamaica U20	14+	(13+)
2018	Jamaica	2	(0)
- * Club domestic league appearances and goals as of April 23, 2026 ‡ National team caps and goals as of 21 July 2018

Oshay Keyona Nelson-Lawes (born 27 June 1996) is a footballer who plays as a forward who plays for North Mississauga SC in the Ontario Premier League. Born in Canada, she represents the Jamaica women's national team.

== College career ==
In 2016, she attended Tyler Junior College scoring 20 goals in 24 games for the women's soccer team. She was named a 2016 NJCAA Division I Women's Soccer First Team All-American.

In 2019, she attended Ryerson University appearing in four games.

== Club career ==
From 2015 to 2017, Lawes played with North Mississauga SC in League1 Ontario. In 2015, she was named a League First Team All-Star.

In 2018, she was one of the first two official signings for Blue Devils FC's women's team, with whom she played for two seasons.

In 2021, she played with Woodbridge Strikers.

In 2022, she played with ProStars FC.

== International career ==
Nelson-Lawes represented Jamaica at the 2012 CONCACAF Women's U-17 Championship.

At the 2014 CONCACAF Women's U-20 Championship qualification tournament, she scored a hat trick against Bermuda July 23, as well as another one in the next match against Curaçao. She scored another hat-trick in the second round of qualifying against St. Kitts and Nevis.

She was named to the Jamaica U20 for the 2014 CONCACAF Women's U-20 Championship. At the 2015 CONCACAF Women's U-20 Championship, she scored four goals in a 6–1 victory over Trinidad and Tobago, equalling a tournament scoring record for most goals in a single match.

She made her senior debut during the 2018 Central American and Caribbean Games.

== Personal life ==
Nelson-Lawes' grandparents hail from Clarendon.
