= Mariana López =

Puerto Rican footballer

Personal information
- Full name: Mariana Beatriz López Crespo
- Position: Forward

College career
| Years | Team | Apps | (Gls) |
| 2017 | AD Moravia | | |

International career^{‡}
| 2015 | Puerto Rico U20 | 1+ | (1) |
| 2018 | Puerto Rico | 1+ | (1) |
- ‡ National team caps and goals as of May 5, 2018

Mariana Beatriz López Crespo is a Puerto Rican footballer who plays as a forward. She has been a member of the Puerto Rico women's national team. She now is the manager of Young Miko.

== International career ==
López represented Puerto Rico at the 2015 CONCACAF Women's U-20 Championship qualification. At senior level, she capped during the 2018 CONCACAF Women's Championship qualification.

=== International goals ===
Scores and results list Puerto Rico's goal tally first

| No. | Date | Venue | Opponent | Score | Result | Competition | Ref. |
|---|---|---|---|---|---|---|---|
| 1 | May 5, 2018 | Estadio Panamericano, San Cristóbal, Dominican Republic | Anguilla | 6–0 | 10–0 | 2018 CONCACAF Women's Championship qualification | |
