= List of Bermuda women's international footballers =

This is a non-exhaustive list of Bermuda women's international footballers – association football players who have appeared at least once for the senior Bermuda women's national football team.

== Players ==
Key
**Bold**	Named to the national team in the past year

Name	Caps	Goals	National team years	Club(s)
Nia Christopher	7	6	–	–
Victoria Davis	5	1	–	–
Keunna Dill	8	1	–	–
Leilanni Nesbeth	4	5	–	–
Aaliyah Nolan	1	0	–	–
Danni Watson	4	0	–	–

== See also ==
- Bermuda women's national football team
