= Chanel Hudson-Marks =

Canadian-Jamaican footballer (born 1997)

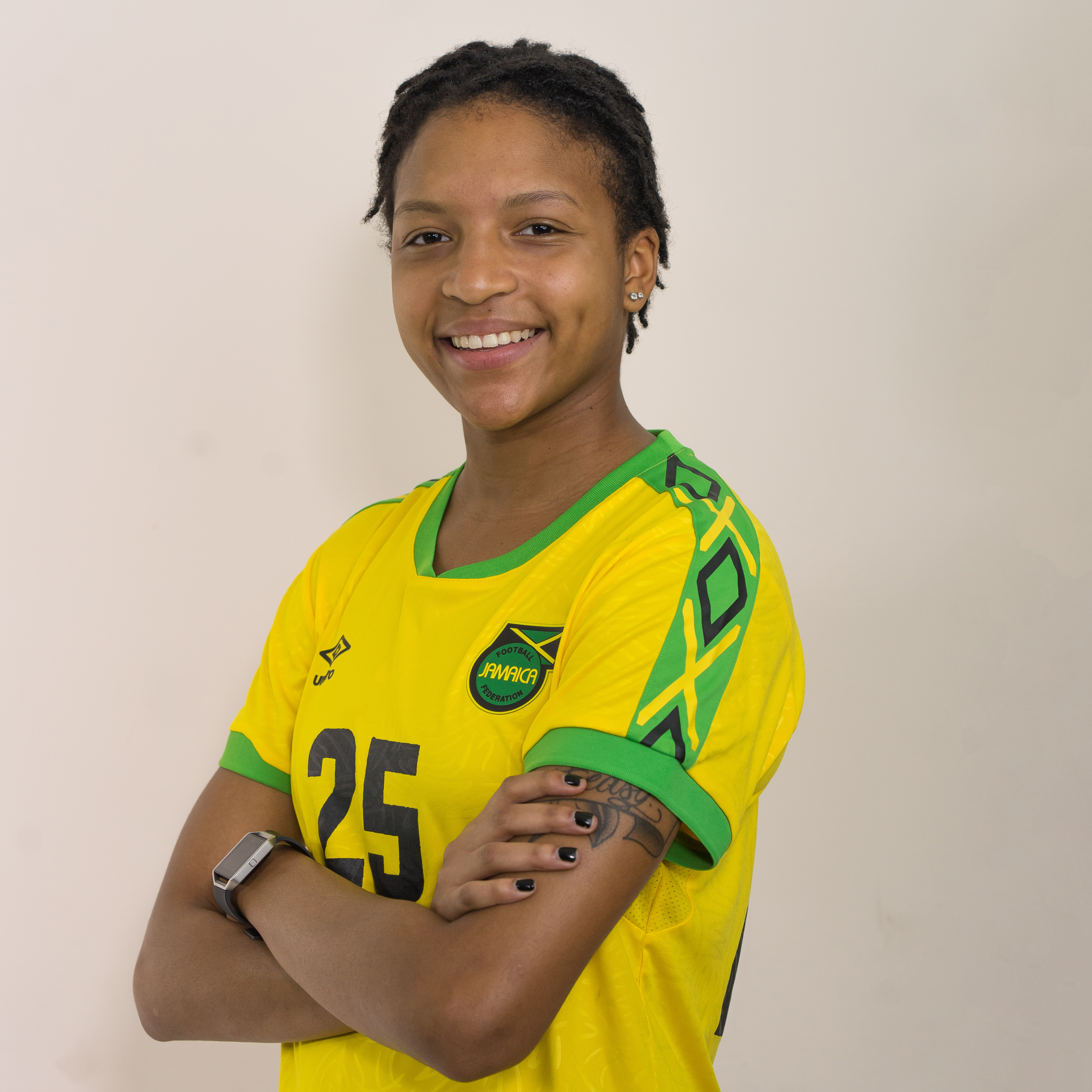
- Hudson-Marks with Jamaica in 2019

Personal information
- Full name: Chanel Simone Hudson-Marks
- Date of birth: September 14, 1997 (age 29)
- Place of birth: Toronto, Ontario, Canada
- Positions: Forward; midfielder

Youth career
- North Mississauga SC

College career
| Years | Team | Apps | (Gls) |
| 2015–2018 | Memphis Tigers | 73 | (5) |

Senior career*
| Years | Team | Apps | (Gls) |
| 2015 | Woodbridge Strikers | | (8) |
| 2016 | North Mississauga SC | 2 | (1) |

International career^{‡}
| 2015 | Jamaica U20 | 3 | (1) |
| 2019– | Jamaica | 3 | (0) |
- * Club domestic league appearances and goals as of 9 November 2018 ‡ National team caps and goals as of 3 March 2019

Chanel Simone Hudson-Marks (born September 14, 1997) is a Canadian-born Jamaican footballer who plays as a forward for the Jamaica women's national team.

== Club career ==
In 2015, she played with the Woodbridge Strikers in League1 Ontario scoring 8 goals.

In 2016, she played for North Mississauga SC, scoring one goal in two appearances.

== International career ==
Hudson-Marks represented Jamaica at the 2015 CONCACAF Women's U-20 Championship. She made her senior debut in a 1–0 friendly win against Chile on 28 February 2019.

=== International goals ===
Scores and results list Jamaica's goal tally first

| No. | Date | Venue | Opponent | Score | Result | Competition |
|---|---|---|---|---|---|---|
| 1 | 3 August 2019 | Estadio Universidad San Marcos, Lima, Peru | Paraguay | 1–1 | 1–3 | 2019 Pan American Games |

== Personal life ==
Hudson-Marks' cousin is Olympic gold-medalist Usain Bolt.
