= Paloma Zermeño =

American-born Mexican footballer and beach soccer player

Personal information
- Full name: Paloma Zermeño Rodríguez
- Date of birth: 18 June 1995 (age 31)
- Place of birth: Alameda, California, United States
- Position: Forward

College career
Years	Team	Apps	(Gls)
2013–2015	CCSF Rams		(35)

International career^{‡}
2014	Mexico U-20	4	(4)
2015–	Mexico	5	(0)
2017–	Mexico (beach soccer)	1	(1)
- ‡ National team caps and goals as of 10 February 2016

Paloma Zermeño Rodríguez (born 18 June 1995) is an American-born Mexican footballer and beach soccer player who represents Mexico in international competitions at both sports. She played for the Mexico women's national football team as a forward. She is currently serving as the captain of the Mexican women's national beach soccer team.

== International career ==
Zermeño represented Mexico at the 2014 CONCACAF Women's U-20 Championship. There, she got an ACL injury during the final match against United States. Due to that, she missed the 2014 FIFA U-20 Women's World Cup, and the 2014 season for City College of San Francisco.

She made her senior debut on 16 December 2015, starting in a 3–0 victory against Trinidad and Tobago at the International Women's Football Tournament of Natal of that year. She also appeared at the 2016 Four Nations Tournament and the 2016 CONCACAF Women's Olympic Qualifying Championship. She assisted Katie Johnson in the 6–0 victory against Puerto Rico on 10 February 2016.
