= Martina Lončar =

Canadian-born Croatian footballer

Personal information
- Date of birth: 18 July 1997 (age 29)
- Place of birth: Mississauga, Ontario, Canada
- Height: 1.70 m (5 ft 7 in)
- Position: Midfielder

Youth career
- 2004–2015: Brampton Brams United

College career
Years	Team	Apps	(Gls)
2015–2018	Colgate Raiders	66	(3)

Senior career*
Years	Team	Apps	(Gls)
2015	ProStars FC		

International career^{‡}
2015	Canada U20	2	(1)
2018	Croatia	2	(0)
- * Club domestic league appearances and goals as of 19:28, 30 August 2019 (UTC) ‡ National team caps and goals as of 19:28, 30 August 2019 (UTC)

Martina Lončar (born 18 July 1997) is a footballer who plays as a midfielder. Born in Canada, she represented the Croatia women's national team at senior level.

== Playing career ==
She began playing youth soccer at age 7 with Brampton Brams United.

In 2015, she joined ProStars FC in League1 Ontario. She was named a league Second-Team All-Star.

From 2015 to 2018, she attended Colgate University, playing for the Colgate Raiders women's team. As a freshman, she was named to the New York Challenge Cup All-Tournament Team. She scored her first NCAA goal on August 18, 2018, against the Virginia Cavaliers. She scored a brace (two goals) against the Loyola Greyhounds on September 15, 2018, which earned her Patriot League Offensive player of the Week honours. She was three-time Patriot League Academic Honor Roll recipient and in her senior year was the Colgate Athletics Scholar-Athlete of the Year.

== International career ==
Lončar attended youth camps with the Canada U17, Canada U20, and Canada U23 from 2014 to 2016. She was named to the U20 team for the 2015 CONCACAF Women's U-20 Championship. She made her international debut and scored her first goal for Canada U20 on December 3, 2015, against Trinidad and Tobago U20. At the tournament, she was part of the silver medal-winning team.

Lončar has been capped for the Croatia national team, appearing for the team during the 2019 FIFA Women's World Cup qualifying cycle. She made her debut against Ukraine on April 5, 2018.

== Coaching career ==
In 2021, she joined the American University Eagles as a volunteer assistant coach, where she was completing her master's degree.
