= Michelle Montero =

Costa Rican footballer (born 1994)

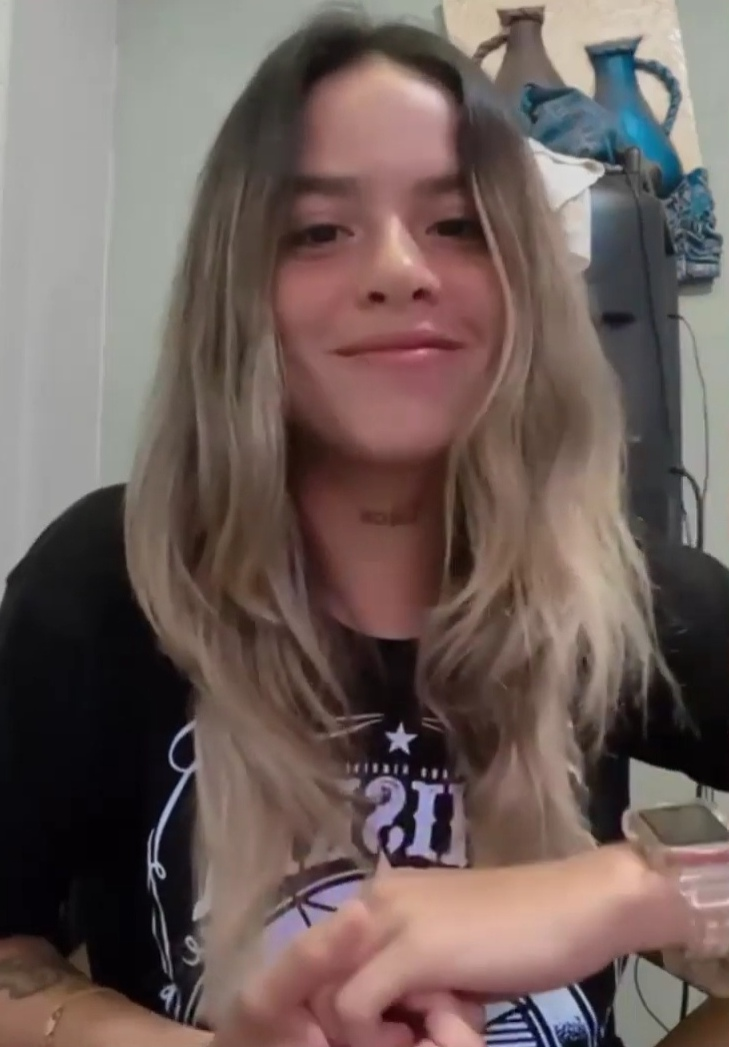

Personal information
- Full name: Michelle Francini Montero Venegas
- Date of birth: 29 August 1994 (age 32)
- Place of birth: Sarapiquí, Heredia, Costa Rica
- Height: 1.67 m (5 ft 5 1/2 in)
- Position: Forward

Team information
- Current team: Pérez Zeledón

Senior career*
| Years | Team | Apps | (Gls) |
| 2013–2017 | UCEM Alajuela | | |
| 2019 | AD Moravia | | |
| 2020–2021 | Herediano | 13 | (3) |
| 2020 | → Liga de Macas (loan) | 0 | (0) |
| 2021 | Hapoel Be'er Sheva | 8 | (2) |
| 2021–2022 | Cruz Azul | 23 | (4) |
| 2022– | Pérez Zeledón | 0 | (0) |

International career^{‡}
| 2014 | Costa Rica U-20 | 5 | (3) |
| 2021– | Costa Rica | 1 | (1) |
- * Club domestic league appearances and goals as of 1 December 2021 ‡ National team caps and goals as of 1 December 2021

Michelle Francini Montero Venegas (born 29 August 1994) is a Costa Rican footballer who plays as a forward for A.D. Municipal Pérez Zeledón and the Costa Rica national team.

== Early life ==
Montero was born in Sarapiquí in Heredia Province.

== Club career ==
=== UCEM Alajuela ===
While still in high school, Montero signed for UCEM Alajuela. On 5 May 2013, she scored five goals in a 6–1 victory against Carrillo.

=== AD Moravia ===
Montero initially retired in 2017, but signed with AD Moravia in 2019 following an invitation from coach Bernal Castillo.

=== C.S. Herediano ===
In January 2020, Montero joined C.S. Herediano when C.S. Herediano took over running of AD Moravia's senior team.

=== Liga Deportiva Juvenil de Macas ===
In February 2020, Montero and her Herediano teammate María José Morales joined Superliga Femenina side Liga Deportiva Juvenil de Macas on a seven-month loan. Both loans were terminated in July.

=== Hapoel Be'er Sheva F.C. ===
In February 2021, Montero signed with Ligat Nashim side Hapoel Be'er Sheva. Her three-month stint coincided with the 2021 Israel–Palestine crisis, which she later said impacted her mental health.

=== Cruz Azul ===
In July 2021, Montero signed with Liga MX Femenil side Cruz Azul, becoming the team's first foreign player.

=== A.D. Municipal Pérez Zeledón ===
In May 2022, Montero signed with Costa Rican Women's Premier Division team A.D. Municipal Pérez Zeledón.

== International career ==
Montero represented Costa Rica in the 2014 CONCACAF Women's U-20 Championship, scoring in the third-place playoff against Trinidad and Tobago. She was later included in Costa Rica's squad for the 2014 FIFA U-20 Women's World Cup, scoring in a 5–1 loss to France.

Montero made her senior debut for Costa Rica on 30 November 2021, scoring in a 5–2 friendly win against Nicaragua.
