= Kensia Destinvil =

Haitian footballer (born 1997)

Personal information
- Date of birth: 27 September 1997 (age 29)
- Position: Midfielder

Senior career*
Years	Team	Apps	(Gls)
- Camp Nous Academy

International career^{‡}
2013	Haiti U17	1	(0)
2014–2015	Haiti	2	(0)
- * Club domestic league appearances and goals ‡ National team caps and goals as of 17 September 2015.

Kensia Destinvil (born 27 September 1997) is a Haitian footballer who plays as a midfielder. She has been a member of the Haiti women's national team.

== Club career ==
Destinvil has played for Camp Nous Academy in Haiti.

== International career ==
Destinvil represented Haiti at the 2013 CONCACAF Women's U-17 Championship. She capped at senior level during the 2014 Central American and Caribbean Games.
