= 2014 CONCACAF Women's U-20 Championship qualification =

The qualifying tournaments to the 2014 CONCACAF Under-20 Women's Championship, the North American continent's youth football championships started in July 2013. The qualification process was divided into the Central American and Caribbean zone. USA and Mexico, as well as hosts Cayman Islands, were automatically qualified to the final tournament.

== Central America qualifying ==
Three teams will advance to the final tournament. The Central American Football Union set the dates for the tournament on 9 July 2013.

=== Group 1 ===
Played from 21 to 25 August 2013 in Honduras.

Team	Pld	W	D	L	GF	GA	GD	Pts
Honduras	3	2	1	0	5	3	+2	7
Guatemala	3	2	0	1	6	4	+2	6
El Salvador	3	1	1	1	6	7	-1	4
Belize	3	0	0	3	7	10	-3	0

21 August 2013
Guatemala	2–0	El Salvador
Honduras	2–1	Belize
23 August 2013
Belize	3–4	Guatemala
Honduras	2–2	El Salvador
25 August 2013
El Salvador	4–3	Belize
Honduras	1–0	Guatemala

=== Group 2 ===
Played from 4 to 8 September 2013 in Panama.

Team	Pld	W	D	L	GF	GA	GD	Pts
Costa Rica	2	2	0	0	5	2	+3	6
Nicaragua	2	0	1	2	2	3	-1	1
Panama	2	0	1	1	2	4	–2	1

7 September 2013
Panama	1 – 1	Nicaragua
9 September 2013
Nicaragua	1 – 2	Costa Rica
11 September 2013
Panama	1 – 3	Costa Rica

=== Play-off ===
The two second placed teams play two matches on 17 and September 21 to determine the last team qualifying.

Team 1	Agg.	Team 2	1st leg	2nd leg
Nicaragua	1 - 7	Guatemala	0 - 5	1 - 2

== Caribbean qualifying ==
Two teams advanced to the final tournament.

=== First round ===
The winner and runner-up from each group advance to the second round. There are at four groups with fifteen teams.

==== Group 1 ====
Played from 9 to 13 July 2013 in the Dominican Republic.

Team	Pld	W	D	L	GF	GA	GD	Pts
Trinidad and Tobago	2	2	0	0	8	0	+8	6
Dominican Republic	2	1	0	1	5	3	+2	3
Aruba	2	0	0	2	0	10	–10	0

9 July 2013
Dominican Republic	0–3	Trinidad and Tobago
11 July 2013
Trinidad and Tobago	5–0	Aruba
13 July 2013
Dominican Republic	5–0	Aruba

==== Group 2 ====
Played from 16 to 22 July 2013 in the British Virgin Islands.

Team	Pld	W	D	L	GF	GA	GD	Pts
Anguilla	3	3	0	0	5	1	+4	9
Saint Kitts and Nevis	3	2	0	1	16	2	+14	6
Antigua and Barbuda	3	1	0	2	4	5	-1	3
British Virgin Islands	3	0	0	3	0	17	–17	0

16 July 2013
Saint Kitts and Nevis	4–0	Antigua and Barbuda
British Virgin Islands	0–2	Anguilla
18 July 2013
Anguilla	2–1	Saint Kitts and Nevis
British Virgin Islands	0–4	Antigua and Barbuda
20 July 2013
British Virgin Islands	0–11	Saint Kitts and Nevis
Antigua and Barbuda	0–1	Anguilla

==== Group 3 ====
Played from 16 to 20 July 2013 in Suriname.

Team	Pld	W	D	L	GF	GA	GD	Pts
Suriname	3	3	0	0	10	0	+10	9
Grenada	3	2	0	1	6	5	+1	6
Dominica	3	1	0	2	5	8	–3	3
Saint Vincent and the Grenadines	3	0	0	3	1	9	–8	0

16 July 2013
Saint Vincent and the Grenadines	0–3	Grenada
Dominica	0–4	Suriname
18 July 2013
Dominica	3–1	Saint Vincent and the Grenadines
Suriname	3–0	Grenada
20 July 2013
Grenada	3–2	Dominica
Suriname	3–0	Saint Vincent and the Grenadines

==== Group 4 ====
Played from 21 to 28 July 2013.

Team	Pld	W	D	L	GF	GA	GD	Pts
Jamaica	3	3	0	0	17	1	+16	9
Cuba	3	2	0	1	11	2	+9	6
Bermuda	3	1	0	2	3	11	–8	3
Curaçao	3	0	0	3	0	17	–17	0

23 July 2013
Cuba	6–0	Curaçao
Bermuda	0–7	Jamaica
25 July 2013
Bermuda	0–4	Cuba
Jamaica	8–0	Curaçao
27 July 2013
Curaçao	0–3	Bermuda
Jamaica	2–1	Cuba

=== Second round ===
The second round is played in November in Jamaica. The top two of each group advance to the semi-finals.

==== Group 1 ====
Team	Pld	W	D	L	GF	GA	GD	Pts
Trinidad and Tobago	3	3	0	0	15	2	+13	9
Cuba	3	2	0	1	14	5	+9	6
Anguilla	3	0	1	2	1	10	–9	1
Grenada	3	0	1	2	4	17	–13	1

18 October 2013
Trinidad and Tobago	3–0	Anguilla
Cuba	7–2	Grenada
20 October 2013
Anguilla	0–6	Cuba
Grenada	1–9	Trinidad and Tobago
22 October 2013
Anguilla	1–1	Grenada
Trinidad and Tobago	3–1	Cuba

==== Group 2 ====
Team	Pld	W	D	L	GF	GA	GD	Pts
Jamaica	3	3	0	0	18	1	+17	9
Dominican Republic	3	2	0	1	9	3	+6	6
Saint Kitts and Nevis	3	1	0	2	6	19	–13	3
Suriname	3	0	0	3	3	13	–10	0

19 October 2013
Jamaica	11–0	Saint Kitts and Nevis
Dominican Republic	3–0	Suriname
21 October 2013
Dominican Republic	5–1	Saint Kitts and Nevis
Suriname	0–5	Jamaica
23 October 2013
Saint Kitts and Nevis	5–3	Suriname
Jamaica	2–1	Dominican Republic

=== Knockout-stage ===
==== Semi-finals ====
Winners advance to final.

25 October 2013
Trinidad and Tobago	2–1	Dominican Republic
26 October 2013
Jamaica	5–1	Cuba

==== Third place ====
27 October 2013
Dominican Republic	2–1	Cuba

==== Final ====
Both teams advance to the final tournament.

28 October 2013
Trinidad and Tobago	0–1	Jamaica
