= Jenna Hellstrom =

Canadian soccer player

Personal information
- Full name: Jenna Anne Hellstrom
- Date of birth: April 2, 1995 (age 31)
- Place of birth: Sudbury, Ontario, Canada
- Height: 1.68 m (5 ft 6 in)
- Position: Forward

College career
Years	Team	Apps	(Gls)
2013–2016	Kent State Golden Flashes	74	(37)

Senior career*
Years	Team	Apps	(Gls)
2017	Motor City FC		
2017	FC Rosengård	6	(0)
2018	Djurgårdens IF	0	(0)
2018	Växjö DFF	6	(3)
2019	KIF Örebro	14	(2)
2020	Washington Spirit	3	(0)
2021–2022	KIF Örebro	28	(5)
2022–2023	Dijon	9	(1)

International career^{‡}
2018–2023	Canada	6	(0)
- * Club domestic league appearances and goals as of February 27, 2023 ‡ National team caps and goals as of February 27, 2023

Jenna Anne Hellstrom (born April 2, 1995) is a Canadian former professional soccer player. She earned 6 caps for the Canada national team.

== College career ==
Hellstrom attended Kent State University, where she played for the Golden Flashes from 2013 to 2016. As a freshman, she was named MAC Freshman of the Year after scoring five goals and recording five assists in 16 appearances. During her second year, she started in all 20 games and finished the season as the leading scorer on the team with seven goals, including three game-winners, and six assists. As a junior, she scored eleven goals and recorded twelve assists in 20 appearances.

As a senior, Hellstrom led the MAC in assists (10) and points (38), while ranking second in goals scored (14). She became the first NSCAA All-American in program history after leading the team to its first-ever Mid-American Conference Tournament (MAC) championship. Hellstrom is Kent State's all-time leader in 12 different career and single-season categories, including goals (37), assists (33), game-winning goals (17) and points (107). Hellstrom graduated with a degree in Sports Administration and Business.

== Club career ==
Following a stint with Motor City FC of the WPSL, Hellstrom was named to the FC Kansas City preseason roster for the 2017 NWSL season.

After being released, she left the United States and on July 4, 2017, she signed a short-term contract with FC Rosengård, who had first expressed interest in Hellstrom in the summer of 2016, when she spent three weeks training with the club. On August 19, 2017, she made her debut in a 1–0 win over Eskilstuna United DFF. On August 27, 2017, she won her first trophy as Rosengård defeated Linköpings FC in the Svenska Cupen final. After a few matches she remarked that the game differed significantly from what she was used to during college in North America, where the focus was only on attacking. Now in Rosengård there was a lot more controlling, going sideways and tactics, which she saw as relaxed. On November 15, 2017, she made her UEFA Women's Champions League debut in a 1–0 loss to Chelsea. Hellstrom made a total of 9 appearances for Rosengård in all competitions.

In December 2017, Hellstrom joined Djurgårdens IF. On February 10, 2018, she made her debut in a 2–0 home victory against Hammarby in Svenska Cupen. On March 18, 2018, she scored her first goal in a 2–1 loss to Rosengård in the Svenska Cupen.

On August 14, 2018, Hellstrom signed with Växjö DFF. On August 26, 2018, she made her debut in a 2–1 win over Vittsjö GIK. On September 8, 2018, she scored her first goal in a 3–2 victory against IFK Kalmar. She made a total of 7 appearances for the side, scoring three goals.

On December 5, 2018, Hellstrom signed a one-year contract with KIF Örebro for the 2019 season. On July 31, 2019, Hellstrom scored 2 goals in a 3–1 win over Djurgården. It would turn out to be her only goals that season, nevertheless it was a successful season for her.

In December 2019, Jenna Hellstrom signed with the Washington Spirit in the NWSL. The length of the contract was not announced per league policy. Due to the COVID-19 pandemic the originally planned league was cancelled. There was later played a compressed cup and series, the 2020 Challenge Cup and the Fall Series respectively.

On 29 December 2020 KIF Örebro announced that Hellstrom would return to the club for the 2021 season. She expressed joy over returning to Örebro and Sweden, saying it has become her second home after the years in Sweden, was really looking forward to it, and had fond memories of the 2019 season as it went well for her then and led to her being selected to the national team squad for the 2019 FIFA Women's World Cup.

On 15 July 2022, Hellstrom signed a two-year contract with Dijon FCO. Hellstrom announced her retirement on 27 February 2023.

== International career ==
In July 2010, Hellstrom was called up to the under-15 national team for a training camp in the United States. In November 2017, she received her first senior call-up. On March 5, 2018, she made her debut for Canada in a 3–0 win over South Korea in the 2018 Algarve Cup. On May 25, 2019, she was named to the roster for the 2019 FIFA Women's World Cup.

In May 2021 she said she hoped that her good performance in KIF Örebro during the spring would lead her to being selected for the national team squad to the 2020 Olympics. However, she was not selected for the final 22-player roster.

== Career statistics ==
=== Club ===
As of 23 May 2021

Club	League	Season	League		Cup (Note: Includes the Svenska Cupen)		League Cup (Note: Includes the NWSL Challenge Cup)		Continental (Note: Includes the UEFA Women's Champions League)		Total	
Club	League	Season	Apps	Goals	Apps	Goals	Apps	Goals	Apps	Goals	Apps	Goals
FC Rosengård	Damallsvenskan	2017	6	0	2	0	—		1	0	9	0
Djurgårdens IF	Damallsvenskan	2018	0	0	4	1	—		0	0	4	1
Växjö DFF	Damallsvenskan	2018	6	3	1	0	—		0	0	7	3
KIF Örebro DFF	Damallsvenskan	2019	14	2	1	0	—		0	0	15	2
Washington Spirit	NWSL	2020	3	0	0	0	3	0	0	0	6	0
KIF Örebro DFF	Damallsvenskan	2021	6	2	2	0	—		0	0	8	2
Career total			35	7	10	1	3	0	1	0	36	6

== Honours ==
=== Club ===
FC Rosengård

- Svenska Cupen: 2016–2017
