= Anguilla women's national under-20 football team =

Anguilla
- Association: Anguilla Football Association
- Confederation: CONCACAF (North America)
- Head coach: Ben Gooden
- FIFA code: AIA
First colours	Second colours

Anguilla women's national under-20 football team is the national team of Anguilla.

== History ==
The Anguilla Football Association was founded in 1990 and became affiliated with FIFA in 1996. In 2002 Antigua had 0 registered players, rising to 20 in 2003, 50 in 2004, 65 in 2005 and 100 in 2006. In 2006, of the 12 total football teams in the country, five were for women only.

Between 2002 and 2010 the Anguilla Women's National Under-19 football team participated in the FIFA Women U19/U20 World Cup qualifying tournament. In 2003, 2004 and 2005, the U-19 team played four, six and ten international matches, respectively. In 2005 they became the Anguilla women's national under-20 football team.

In 2006, the team had four training sessions per week while they were preparing for the CONCACAF Under 19 Women's Qualifying Tournament 2005/06 in Group B. They played the first round in Suriname. On 20 September, they beat Netherlands Antilles 5–2. On 22 September, they tied host Suriname 1–1. On 24 September, they lost to Dominica 0–1. Overall, they finished second in their group with one win, one loss and one draw, scoring six goals on their opponents while only allowing four against them.

The team competed in the CONCACAF Under 20 Women's Qualifying Tournament 2007/08. In the Caribbean Qualifying Preliminary Round, they played a home and away series against St. Kitts/Nevis, winning 2–1 at home on 16 June 2007 before a crowd of 350. The team won 2–1 away in Basseterre on 1 July before a crowd of 500. In the first game, Krystie Webster scored in the 7th minute and Kennisha Xavier scored in the 66th minute for Anguilla. Xavier had subbed into the game in the 33rd minute to replace Webster. Melesa Anderson started for Anguilla, Elizabeth Gilbert subbed in for her in the 70th minute, and Glennicia Richardson started but was subbed out in the 75th minute for Delvina Carty. In the 70th minute, Jaynelle Lake was booked. Other starting players in the first home match for Anguilla include Karisa Lake, Khadeema Gumbs, Sharice Richardson, Shakeela Romney, Clardeena Richardson and Judiann Vanterpool. In the second game against St. Kitts/Nevis, Krystie Wesbter scored in the 9th minute and Clardeena Richardson scored in the 85th minute for Anguilla. Glennicia Richardson started and was subbed out in the 54th minute for Delvina Carty. Kennisha Xavier also started and was subbed out in the 85th minute for Gilbert. Anguilla starters included Jaynelle Lake, Melesa Anderson, Karisa Lake, Khadeema Gumbs, Krystie Webster, Sharice Richardson, Shakeela Romney, and Clardeena Richardson.

In the group stage for the Caribbean, they played in Group C with Barbados and Cuba. All matches were played in Havana, Cuba. On 9 August before a crowd of 150, they lost to Barbados 2–3, and on 11 August before a crowd of 200, they lost to Cuba 2–7. Overall, they finished last in their group with two losses, allowing ten goals and only scoring four.

In Germany at the 2011 FIFA Women's Football Symposium, Anguilla Football Association spoke about the best practices for developing the women's game.

The Anguilla Women's National Under-20 football team competed in the CONCACAF Under 20 Women's Championship 2010. In the Caribbean Qualifying stage, they were in Group A and played a home and away series against Cuba. On 18 September at home before a crowd of 300, they lost to Cuba 0–11. In the away match in Cuba on 20 September before a crowd of 100, they lost 0–6.

== Development ==
Football is a growing and the most popular women's sport in the Anguilla with 100 registered football players in 2006. A women's league receives support from the national federation and plays from April to June. Women's football is required to be represented by a specific mandate in the federation's committee.
