= Anguilla Football Association =

Governing body of football in Anguilla

CONCACAF
- Short name: AFA
- Founded: 1990
- Headquarters: The Valley
- FIFA affiliation: 1996
- CONCACAF affiliation: 1994 (Associate member), 1996
- President: Girdon Connor

The Anguilla Football Association is the governing body of football in Anguilla.

== Association staff ==
Name	Position	Source
(Anguilla) Girdon Connor	President	
(Anguilla) Javille Brooks	Vice President	
(Anguilla) Twyla Richardson	General Secretary	
n/a	Treasurer	
(Anguilla) Colin Johnson	Technical Director	
Team Coach (Men's)		
(England) Ben Gooden	Team Coach (Women's)	
(Anguilla) Bonnie Ruan	Media/Communications Manager	
n/a	Futsal Coordinator	
(Anguilla) Ambrell Richardson	Chairperson of the Referees Committee	
(Anguilla) Trevor Rouse	Head/Director of the Referees Department	
(Anguilla) Trevor Rouse	Futsal Coordinator	
(Anguilla) Kay Gumbs	Referee Coordinator	
