= 2014 CONCACAF Women's U-20 Championship =

Campeonato Sub-20 Femenino de la CONCACAF 2014 (in Spanish)

Tournament details
- Host country: Cayman Islands
- Dates: 9–19 January
- Teams: 8 (from 1 confederation)
- Venue(s): 1 (in 1 host city)

Final positions
- Champions: United States (4th title)
- Runners-up: Mexico
- Third place: Costa Rica
- Fourth place: Trinidad and Tobago

Tournament statistics
- Matches played: 16
- Goals scored: 80 (5 per match)
- Top scorer(s): (Mexico) Tanya Samarzich (United States) McKenzie Meehan (6 goals)
- Best player(s): (United States) Rose Lavelle
- Best goalkeeper: (United States) Katelyn Rowland
- Fair play award: United States

The 2014 CONCACAF Women's U-20 Championship was the seventh edition of the CONCACAF Women's U-20 Championship. The United States went into the tournament as defending champions and successfully retained their title.

The tournament was hosted by the Cayman Islands from 9 to 19 January 2014.

The top three teams qualified for the 2014 FIFA U-20 Women's World Cup in Canada. Canada has already qualified for the World Cup as the host and did not participate in this tournament.

The tournament was won by the United States, who defeated Mexico in the final, 4–0. Costa Rica secured the final qualification position by defeating Trinidad and Tobago in the third place match, 7–3 in Added Extra Time.

== Qualified teams ==
Team	Qualification	Appearance	Previous best performances
Cayman Islands	Host	1st	Debut
North American zone
Mexico	Automatic	7th	Runner-up (2010)
United States	Automatic	7th	Champion (2006, 2010, 2012)
Central American zone qualified through the Central America qualifying
Honduras	Group 1 winner	1st	Debut
Costa Rica	Group 2 winner	5th	Third place (2004)
Guatemala	Playoff winner	2nd	Group stage (2010, 2012)
Caribbean zone qualified through the Caribbean qualifying
Jamaica	Winner	7th	Fourth place (2006)
Trinidad and Tobago	Runner-up	6th	3rd/4th place (2002)

Bold indicates that the corresponding team was hosting the event.

== Group stage ==
The draw was announced on 5 November 2013.

All times are local (UTC-05:00).

=== Tie-breaking criteria ===
Teams were ranked on the following criteria:

1. Greater number of points obtained in all group matches.
2. Goal difference in all group matches.
3. Greater number of goals scored in all group matches.
4. Greater number of points obtained in group matches between the teams concerned.
5. Drawing of lots.

=== Group A ===
Pos	Team	Pld	W	D	L	GF	GA	GD	Pts	Qualification
1	United States	3	3	0	0	19	0	+19	**9**	Knockout stage
2	Costa Rica	3	1	1	1	6	8	−2	**4**	Knockout stage
3	Jamaica	3	0	2	1	1	4	−3	**2**	
4	Guatemala	3	0	1	2	1	15	−14	**1**	

Source: CONCACAF
Rules for classification: Tie-breaking
January 9, 2014
17:00

Guatemala	0–0	Jamaica
	Report

Truman Bodden Sports Complex, George Town
January 9, 2014
19:30

United States	6–0	Costa Rica
Horan 13', 24', 45+2', 87'; Green 61'; Jordan 81'	Report

Truman Bodden Sports Complex, George Town

January 11, 2014
17:00

Costa Rica	5–1	Guatemala
Villalobos 5'; Hernández 10'; Talavera 24', 44'; Muñoz 31'	Report	Solorzano 66'

Truman Bodden Sports Complex, George Town
January 11, 2014
19:30

Jamaica	0–3	United States
	Report	Jordan 31'; Sullivan 41'; Meehan 82'

Truman Bodden Sports Complex, George Town

January 13, 2014
17:00

Jamaica	1–1	Costa Rica
Lawes 56'	Report	Montero 7'

Truman Bodden Sports Complex, George Town
January 13, 2014
19:30

United States	10–0	Guatemala
Meehan 8', 57', 74'; Amack 22'; Basinger 31'; Jordan 39' (pen.); Hill 48' (pen.); Purce 54'; Weber 61', 68'	Report

Truman Bodden Sports Complex, George Town

=== Group B ===
Pos	Team	Pld	W	D	L	GF	GA	GD	Pts	Qualification
1	Mexico	3	3	0	0	19	1	+18	**9**	Knockout stage
2	Trinidad and Tobago	3	2	0	1	6	3	+3	**6**	Knockout stage
3	Honduras	3	1	0	2	4	12	−8	**3**	
4	Cayman Islands **(H)**	3	0	0	3	0	13	−13	**0**	

Source: CONCACAF
Rules for classification: Tie-breaking
January 10, 2014
17:00

Honduras	0–2	Trinidad and Tobago
	Report	Walker 39'; Rice 49'

Truman Bodden Sports Complex, George Town
January 10, 2014
19:30

Cayman Islands	0–6	Mexico
	Report	Samarzich 6', 9', 35'; Zermeño 24', 57'; Pérez 83' (pen.)

Truman Bodden Sports Complex, George Town

January 12, 2014
17:00

Mexico	10–1	Honduras
Pineda 3'; Orozco 19', 45+1', 75'; Pérez 27'; Samarzich 52', 64', 76'; Campos 68' (pen.), 87'	Report	Cruz 80'

Truman Bodden Sports Complex, George Town
January 12, 2014
19:30

Cayman Islands	0–4	Trinidad and Tobago
	Report	Camejo 2'; Bodden 18' (o.g.); Debesette 41'; Walker 46'

Truman Bodden Sports Complex, George Town

January 14, 2014
17:00

Trinidad and Tobago	0–3	Mexico
	Report	Zermeño 33'; Solís 49' (pen.), 77'

Truman Bodden Sports Complex, George Town
January 14, 2014
19:30

Cayman Islands	0–3	Honduras
	Report	Fonseca 48', 81'; Rivera 90+5'

Truman Bodden Sports Complex, George Town

== Knockout stage ==
In the knockout stage, if a match is level at the end of normal playing time, extra time is played (two periods of 15 minutes each) and followed, if necessary, by penalty shoot-out to determine the winner.

The winners of the two semifinals and the third place match qualify for the 2014 FIFA U-20 Women's World Cup in Canada.

Semi-finals
17 January 2014 – George Town
**Mexico**	**3**
Costa Rica	1
17 January 2014 – George Town
**United States**	**6**
Trinidad and Tobago	0

Final
19 January 2014 – George Town
Mexico	0
**United States**	**4**
Third place
19 January 2014 – George Town
**Costa Rica** (a.e.t.)	**7**
Trinidad and Tobago	3

=== Semi-finals ===
17 January 2014
16:00

Mexico	3–1	Costa Rica
Zermeño 32'; Ibarra 67'; Valadez 73'	Report	Villalobos 17'

Truman Bodden Sports Complex, George Town
17 January 2014
19:00

United States	6–0	Trinidad and Tobago
Meehan 13', 65'; Jordan 27'; Amack 33', 39'; Weber 86'	Report

Truman Bodden Sports Complex, George Town

=== Third-place match ===
19 January 2014
16:00

Costa Rica	7–3 (a.e.t.)	Trinidad and Tobago
Monge 34'; Talavera 71'; Montero 86'; Muñoz 94', 96'; Arias 115'; Arguedas 120+1'	Report	Walker 16', 28'; Debesette 42'

Truman Bodden Sports Complex, George Town

=== Final ===
19 January 2014
19:00

Mexico	0–4	United States
	Report	Sullivan 9'; Jordan 59'; Purce 68'; Fuentes 90+3' (o.g.)

Truman Bodden Sports Complex, George Town

== Winners ==
2014 CONCACAF Women's Under-20 Championship winners

**United States**
**Fourth title**

== Goalscorers ==
6 goals

- (United States) McKenzie Meehan
- (Mexico) Tanya Samarzich

5 goals

- (United States) Savannah Jordan

4 goals

- (United States) Lindsey Horan
- (Trinidad and Tobago) Anique Walker
- (Mexico) Paloma Zermeño

3 goals

- (United States) Stephanie Amack
- (Costa Rica) Yesmi Talavera
- (Costa Rica) Nicole Araya
- (United States) Mallory Weber
- (Mexico) Jazmín Aguas

2 goals

- (Trinidad and Tobago) Khadidra Debesette
- (Mexico) Cynthia Pineda
- (United States) Andi Sullivan
- (Honduras) Linda Fonseca
- (United States) Margaret Purce
- (Costa Rica) Michelle Venegas
- (Mexico) Amanda Perez
- (Mexico) Daniela Solís
- (Costa Rica) Jazmin Villalobos

1 goal

- (Costa Rica) Mariana Arguedas
- (Mexico) Briana Campos
- (United States) Summer Green
- (Mexico) Fabiola Ibarra
- (Trinidad and Tobago) Brianna Rice
- (Mexico) Jessica Valadez
- (Costa Rica) Katheryn Arias
- (Trinidad and Tobago) Shanisa Camejo
- (Costa Rica) Krista Hernández
- (Jamaica) Oshay Nelson-Lawes
- (Honduras) Johana Rivera
- (United States) Brittany Basinger
- (Honduras) Seidy Cruz
- (United States) Rachel Hill
- (Costa Rica) Daphne Monge
- (Guatemala) Aisha Solorzano

Own goals

- (Cayman Islands) Jetena Bodden (playing against Trinidad and Tobago)
- (Mexico) Estefanía Fuentes (playing against United States)

== Awards ==
Golden Ball	Golden Boot	Golden Glove
(United States) Rose Lavelle	(Mexico) Tanya Samarzich (United States) McKenzie Meehan	(United States) Katelyn Rowland
CONCACAF Fair Play Award
United States
