= Taylor Pryce =

James Taylor Pryce, D.D. (1936–2010) was a Canadian Suffragan Bishop.

Pryce was educated at Bishop's University, Lennoxville and ordained in 1963. After a curacy at The Church of the Ascension Toronto he was Priest in charge of Brooklin. He was a suffragan bishop in the Diocese of Toronto from 1985 to 2000.
