= 2013 CONCACAF Women's U-17 Championship qualification =

The qualification progress to the 2013 CONCACAF Women's U-17 Championship is a series of association football matches to determine the teams joining automatic qualified Canada, Mexico and USA in the final tournament. There are to separately organized tournaments, one by the Caribbean Football Union, CFU, and one by the Central American Football Union, UNCAF.

== CFU ==
=== First round ===
The first round is played from 5 to 26 August 2013 in the US Virgin Islands. Four teams played in each group. The top two team, plus the best two third-placed teams advanced to the next round.

==== Group I ====
Played from 5 to 12 August in Puerto Rico. Originally Aruba was drawn into this group, they apparently withdrew.

Team	Pld	W	D	L	GF	GA	GD	Pts
Puerto Rico	2	2	0	0	5	2	+3	6
Bermuda	2	1	0	1	5	4	+1	3
Bahamas	2	0	0	2	3	7	–4	0

Bermuda	4–2	Bahamas
Puerto Rico	3–1	Bahamas
Puerto Rico	2–1	Bermuda

==== Group II ====
Group 2 is played in Trinidad and Tobago from 12 to 19 August.

Team	Pld	W	D	L	GF	GA	GD	Pts
Trinidad and Tobago	3	3	0	0	24	1	+23	9
U.S. Virgin Islands	3	1	1	1	5	13	–13	4
Antigua and Barbuda	3	0	2	1	1	4	–3	2
Saint Kitts and Nevis	3	0	1	2	0	12	–12	1

Saint Kitts and Nevis	0–7	Trinidad and Tobago
U.S. Virgin Islands	0–0	Antigua and Barbuda
Trinidad and Tobago	4–1	Antigua and Barbuda
U.S. Virgin Islands	5–0	Saint Kitts and Nevis
Antigua and Barbuda	0–0	Saint Kitts and Nevis
U.S. Virgin Islands	0–13	Trinidad and Tobago

==== Group III ====
Played from 19 to 26 August in the Dominican Republic.

Team	Pld	W	D	L	GF	GA	GD	Pts
Haiti	3	3	0	0	36	1	+35	9
Dominican Republic	3	2	0	1	24	6	+18	6
Grenada	3	1	0	3	4	16	–12	3
Guyana	3	0	0	3	0	40	–40	0

Haiti	19–0	Guyana
Dominican Republic	6–0	Grenada
Grenada	0–10	Haiti
Dominican Republic	17–0	Guyana
Dominican Republic	1–6	Haiti
Grenada	4–0	Guyana

=== Second round ===
The final round is played from 20 to 29 September 2013 at Port-au-Prince, Haiti. Eight teams will take part and three will move on to the final tournament.

==== Group A ====
Team	Pld	W	D	L	GF	GA	GD	Pts
Puerto Rico	3	3	0	0	14	0	+14	9
Haiti	3	2	0	1	28	2	+26	6
Antigua and Barbuda	3	1	0	2	3	11	–8	3
U.S. Virgin Islands	3	0	0	3	0	32	–32	0

Haiti	6–0	Antigua and Barbuda
Puerto Rico	7–0	U.S. Virgin Islands
Haiti	22–0	U.S. Virgin Islands
Puerto Rico	5–0	Antigua and Barbuda
Antigua and Barbuda	3–0	U.S. Virgin Islands
Haiti	0–2	Puerto Rico

==== Group B ====
Team	Pld	W	D	L	GF	GA	GD	Pts
Bermuda	3	3	0	0	6	1	+5	9
Trinidad and Tobago	3	2	0	1	15	2	+13	6
Dominican Republic	3	0	1	2	3	9	–6	1
Grenada	3	0	1	2	1	13	–12	1

Trinidad and Tobago	10–0	Grenada
Bermuda	3–1	Dominican Republic
Grenada	1–1	Dominican Republic
Bermuda	1–0	Trinidad and Tobago
Bermuda	2–0	Grenada
Trinidad and Tobago	5–1	Dominican Republic

=== Knockout stage ===
Semi-finals
Puerto Rico	1
Trinidad and Tobago	4
Bermuda	0
Haiti	4

Final
Trinidad and Tobago	1
Haiti	0
Third place
Puerto Rico	2
Bermuda	0

== UNCAF ==
In Central America four teams were drawn into two matches. El Salvador and Guatemala qualified to the final tournament.

Team 1	Agg.	Team 2	1st leg	2nd leg
El Salvador	4–3	Nicaragua	3–1	1–2
Guatemala	15–0	Belize	8–0	7–0
