= Escuela Internacional Sampedrana =

Location
- PO Box 565; San Pedro Sula, Cortes; Honduras

Information
- Type: Private
- Established: 1953
- Faculty: 450
- Grades: Toddlers-12th grade
- Enrollment: 1805, multi-cultural student population
- Colors: Blue and yellow
- Mascot: Bulldog
- Accreditation: COGNIA

Escuela Internacional Sampedrana (EIS) is a private coeducational K-12 school located in the Lomas del Potosí neighborhood of San Pedro Sula, Cortés Department, Honduras.

The school is accredited by the Southern Association of Colleges and Schools (SACS).

EIS is a member of Association of Bilingual Schools of Honduras (ABSH) and Association of American Schools in Central America (AASCA). EIS has 27 AASCA championships, between soccer, basketball, volleyball and track and field (T-third most).

== Faculty ==
The faculty for EIS is composed of 40% Honduran teachers, 25% Canadian and 35% US teachers. All other staff that is not related to teaching is 95% Honduran and 5% International. All teachers at EIS have at minimum a bachelor's degree or equivalent.

== Facilities ==
Separate buildings house the preschool, elementary, middle school, and high school students. The administration offices, main library, auditorium, and gymnasium are in separate buildings. Athletic facilities include a lower school playground, indoor and outdoor courts for basketball and volleyball, and playing fields for soccer and softball. The school recently inaugurated new locker rooms next to the soccer fields.

The school has 61 classrooms, as well as science and computer laboratories, music rooms, a media center, and a separate preschool building. The elementary complex was renovated during the summer of 1997. The middle school was renovated during the summer of 2004. The preschool building was renovated during the summer of 2002.

The school has a vast library with content for elementary and middle/high school. A small collection exists for the preschool. Students can find material in English and Spanish.

== Extracurricular activities ==
Extracurricular activities include:

- National Honor Society
- Student Council
- Yearbook
- Knowledge Bowl
- Model United Nations

SPSMUN, the annual conference held by the EIS MUN club, was started by alumni Shady Zummar and Christopher Harris under the supervision of Nicolas Harris, the club's advisor at the time.

- MOAS
- Band
- Drama
- Chess
- HACIA Democracy
- Global Issues Network
- Math Club
- Charity Club
- Robotics (Uses Spike Prime and EV3 and participates in First Lego League)

== Sports ==
- Soccer
- Basketball
- Volleyball
- Track and Field
- Cross Country
- Cheerleading
