= Darline Radamaker =

Haitian footballer (born 1999)

Personal information
- Full name: Darline Radamaker
- Date of birth: 16 April 1999 (age 27)
- Place of birth: Les Cayes, Haiti
- Height: 1.60 m (5 ft 3 in)
- Position: Midfielder

Youth career
- 2013–2017: Michigan Gators

College career
| Years | Team | Apps | (Gls) |
| 2018–2021 | Grand Valley State Lakers | 81 | (5) |

International career^{‡}
- Haiti U20
| 2015 | Haiti | 2 | (0) |
- ‡ National team caps and goals as of September 20, 2015

Darline Radamaker (born 16 April 1999) is an American-raised Haitian footballer who plays as a midfielder. She has been a member of the Haiti women's national team. She is nicknamed the "Haitian Marta" due to her adroit dribbling. She is widely expected to be a key player for the Haiti U-20 Women's National Team as it attempts to qualify for the 2016 FIFA U-20 Women's World Cup.
