= Averie Collins =

American professional soccer player

Personal information
- Full name: Averie Ann Collins
- Date of birth: March 3, 1997 (age 29)
- Place of birth: Bozeman, Montana, United States
- Height: 1.80 m (5 ft 11 in)
- Positions: Forward; midfielder

College career
Years	Team	Apps	(Gls)
2015–2017	Stanford Cardinal	57	(10)
2019	Washington State Cougars	24	(6)

Senior career*
Years	Team	Apps	(Gls)
2020–2022	Washington Spirit	2	(0)
- * Club domestic league appearances and goals

Averie Ann Collins (born March 3, 1997) is an American former professional soccer player who played as a forward. She played college soccer for the Stanford Cardinal and the Washington State Cougars before being selected by the Washington Spirit in the second round of the 2020 NWSL College Draft.

== Early life ==
Collins is the daughter of Lisa and Shane Collins. Her father was a defensive end for the Washington Redskins from 1992 to 1994. She grew up in Bozeman, Montana where she played both soccer and basketball for Bozeman High School. During her junior year, Collins led Montana in both goals in soccer as well as rebounds in basketball. As a freshman, Collins and her team won the Montana Class AA soccer state championship. She was a two-time NSCAA Montana Player of the Year and she was named the Gatorade Montana Player of the Year as a senior. Collins finished her high school career with 57 goals and 29 assists.

== College career ==
=== Stanford Cardinal ===
Collins attended Stanford University where she played three seasons for the Cardinal and majored in Management Science & Engineering. As a freshman, she appeared as a substitute in 19 games for the Cardinal. She scored three goals, including a game-winning goal in overtime against Washington State University as well as a goal against San Jose State University in the first round of the NCAA Tournament. Stanford advanced to the quarterfinal round where the team fell to Duke after a penalty kick shootout.

The following year, she played in each of the Cardinal's 21 games and made 7 starts. Collins scored five goals, including two game-winning goals, and made 5 assists. During Collins' junior season she made one start and 17 appearances for the Cardinal, scoring two goals and one assist to help Stanford's championship-winning run. She redshirted her senior season in 2018. She closed out her career at Stanford with 10 goals, 5 assists, one national championship, and three Pac-12 titles.

=== Washington State Cougars ===
Collins graduated from Stanford in spring 2019 and decided to pursue an MBA at Washington State University where she played for the Cougars during the fall 2019 season. She started all 24 games for WSU and played as a midfielder, scoring 6 goals and making 5 assists. Collins scored two game-winning goals and made two game-winning assists.

== Club career ==
Collins was selected by the Washington Spirit with the club's second-round, No. 17 overall pick of the 2020 NWSL College Draft. Washington had acquired that pick through a blockbuster trade with Sky Blue FC that sent Mallory Pugh to the New Jersey side in exchange for Sky Blue's 4th, 13th, and 17th overall picks in the 2020 draft and the club's natural 1st round pick in the 2021 NWSL Draft. She made her professional debut in the Spirit's first game of 2020 NWSL Challenge Cup on June 27, 2020 against the Chicago Red Stars, coming on as a substitute for the final four minutes and came close to converting a cross from Dorian Bailey. She started for the Spirit against Portland on July 6 and played the first half of the team's 1–1 draw. Collins then came on as a substitute in the Spirit's final game of the Challenge Cup and made two substitute appearances in the four-game NWSL Fall Series. Overall, she played in 5 of the Spirit's 9 games of the abbreviated 2020 season.

Collins suffered a season-ending anterior cruciate ligament (ACL) injury during a voluntary workout ahead of the Spirit's 2021 preseason. The injury was the result of a non-contact incident that occurred while Collins was playing in a 2v2 game with teammates. Collins underwent surgery on February 3, 2021. She later retired from professional soccer due to the injury.

== Honors ==
Stanford Cardinal

- NCAA Division I Women's Soccer Championship: 2017
- Pac-12 champion: 2015, 2016, 2017

Individual

- Gatorade Montana Player of the Year: 2015
- NSCAA Montana Player of the Year: 2014, 2015
