= Amanda Pérez =

Mexican footballer (born 1994)

Amanda Perez
Personal information
- Full name: Amanda Araceli Pérez Murillo
- Date of birth: 31 July 1994 (age 32)
- Place of birth: Hayward, California, U.S.
- Height: 1.67 m (5 ft 6 in)
- Position: Defensive midfielder

Team information
- Current team: Juárez
- Number: 6

Youth career
- PSV Union

College career
Years	Team	Apps	(Gls)
2013–2017	Washington Huskies	78	(8)

Senior career*
Years	Team	Apps	(Gls)
2018	IL Sandviken	21	(7)
2019	Vittsjö GIK	6	(0)
2020–2021	Sporting CP	2	(0)
2021–2023	América	49	(1)
2024–2025	Pachuca	31	(1)
2025–	Juárez	0	(0)

International career^{‡}
2010	Mexico U17	3	(0)
2012–2014	Mexico U20	8	(0)
2013–2020	Mexico	8	(0)
- * Club domestic league appearances and goals as of 3 November 2024 ‡ National team caps and goals as of 11 March 2020

Amanda Araceli Pérez Murillo (born 31 July 1994) is a professional footballer who plays as a midfielder for Liga MX Femenil club FC Juárez. Born in the United States, she represented Mexico at international level.

She is the younger sister of Club Tijuana (Liga MX Femenil) player Verónica Pérez, a former forward on the Mexico women's national football team and a University of Washington alumna.

== Playing career ==
=== University of Washington ===
Perez played for the University of Washington Huskies. Having graduated from San Mateo High School in 2011, Perez delayed her college enrollment to recover from a knee injury and participate in the 2012 FIFA U-20 Women's World Cup with Mexico.

=== International ===
Perez played for Mexico at both U17 and U20 levels. She played in 2010 FIFA U-17 Women's World Cup, 2012 FIFA U-20 Women's World Cup and 2014 FIFA U-20 Women's World Cup.

She received her senior level call-up from Mexico for the 2013 Algarve Cup, joining older sister and senior veteran Verónica Pérez. She appeared as a late substitute in two out of Mexico's four total matches in Portugal, including the knockout stage match.

== Honours ==
Club América

- Liga MX Femenil: Clausura 2023

== See also ==
- Mexico women's national football team
- Washington Huskies
- List of University of Washington people
