= Alejandra Carrión =

Puerto Rican footballer

Personal information
- Full name: Alejandra Mitchelle Carrión Hernández
- Date of birth: November 5, 1996 (age 30)
- Position: Midfielder

Senior career*
Years	Team	Apps	(Gls)
- Gurabo FC

International career^{‡}
2016–	Puerto Rico	1+	(0)
- * Club domestic league appearances and goals ‡ National team caps and goals as of February 13, 2016

Alejandra Mitchelle Carrión Hernández (born November 5, 1996) is a Puerto Rican footballer who plays as a midfielder. She has been a member of the Puerto Rico women's national team.

== International career ==
Carrión capped for Puerto Rico at senior level during the 2016 CONCACAF Women's Olympic Qualifying Championship.
