= Adriana Tirado =

Puerto Rican footballer

Personal information
- Full name: Adriana María Tirado Ortiz
- Date of birth: 6 October 1998 (age 28)
- Place of birth: San Juan, Puerto Rico
- Height: 1.52 m (5 ft 0 in)
- Position: Midfielder

Youth career
- American Military Academy

College career
Years	Team	Apps	(Gls)
2016–2017	New Mexico State Aggies	22	(3)
2018–2019	Saint Leo Lions	28	(3)

Senior career*
Years	Team	Apps	(Gls)
- Bayamón
2018–2019	Puerto Rico Pride	6	(0)
2021	Gokulam Kerala	0	(0)

International career
2015	Puerto Rico U20	3	(4)
2018–	Puerto Rico	1	(1)
- * Club domestic league appearances and goals

Adriana María "Tuti" Tirado Ortiz (born 6 October 1998) is a Puerto Rican footballer who plays as a midfielder for the Puerto Rico women's national team.

== Career ==
In 2021, she represented Gokulam Kerala in the AFC Women's Club Championship.

== International goals ==
Scores and results list Puerto Rico's goal tally first.

No.	Date	Venue	Opponent	Score	Result	Competition	Ref.
1	11 May 2018	Estadio Panamericano, San Cristóbal, Dominican Republic	Aruba	2–0	5–0	2018 CONCACAF Women's Championship qualification	

== Honors ==
Gokulam Kerala

- AFC Women's Club Championship: third place 2021
