= Natalie Jacobs =

American soccer player (born 1997)

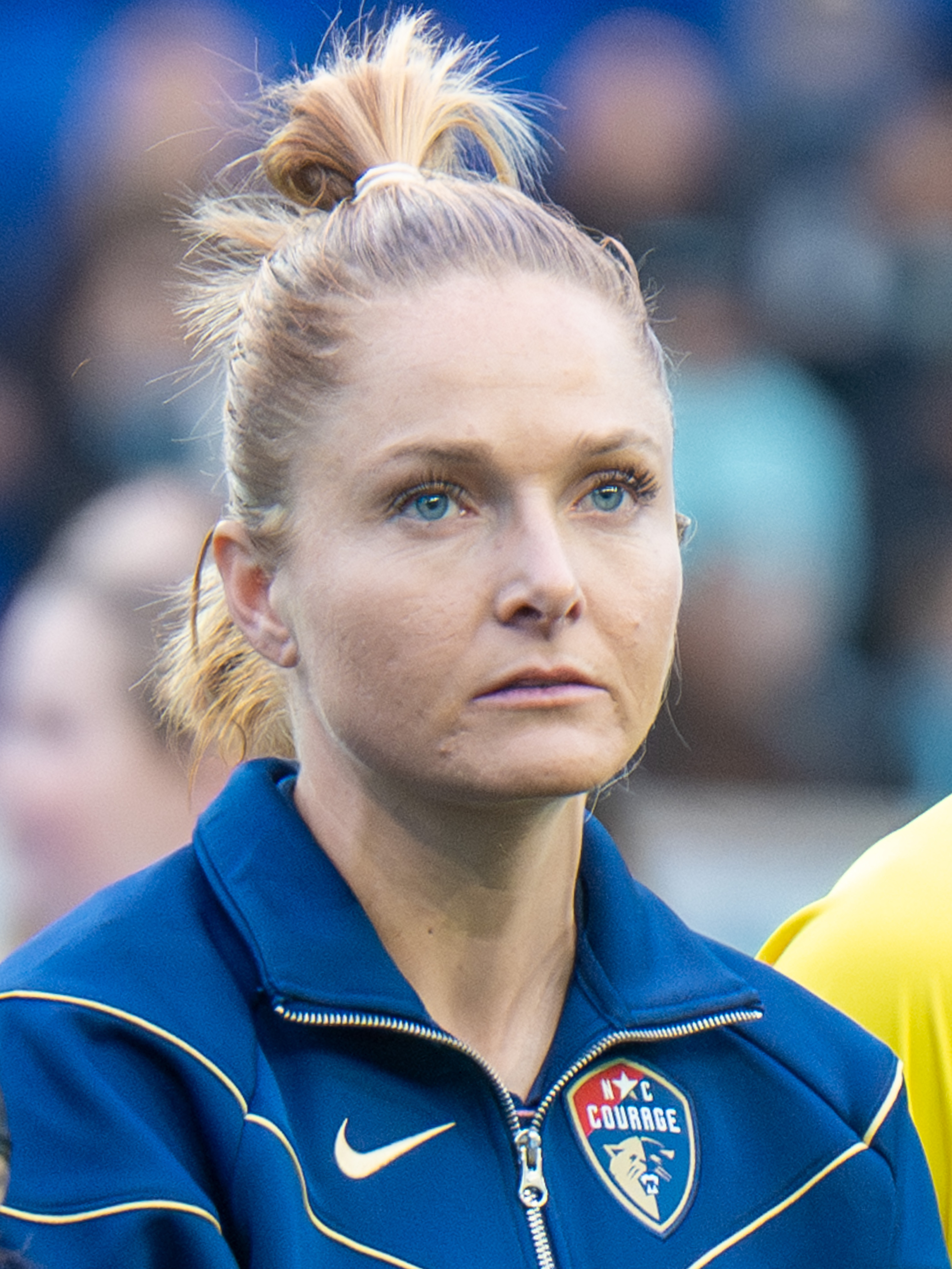
- Jacobs with the North Carolina Courage in 2026

Personal information
- Full name: Natalie Ann Jacobs
- Date of birth: August 16, 1997 (age 29)
- Place of birth: Coto de Caza, California, United States
- Height: 5 ft 8 in (1.73 m)
- Position: Defender

Team information
- Current team: North Carolina Courage
- Number: 4

Youth career
- 2013–2015: Slammers FC

College career
Years	Team	Apps	(Gls)
2015–2017	Notre Dame Fighting Irish	42	(17)
2018–2019	USC Trojans	45	(9)

Senior career*
Years	Team	Apps	(Gls)
2018–2019	LA Galaxy OC	14	(4)
2020–2021	Washington Spirit	4	(0)
2021–2022	Real Betis	17	(0)
2022–2025	Houston Dash	66	(1)
2025–	North Carolina Courage	17	(1)

International career
2013–2014	United States U17		
2014	United States U18		
2015–2016	United States U20	3	(1)
2017	United States U23		
- * Club domestic league appearances and goals as of 06:54, November 8, 2026 (UTC)

Natalie Ann Jacobs (born August 16, 1997) is an American professional soccer player who plays as a center back for the North Carolina Courage of the National Women's Soccer League (NWSL). She played college soccer for the Notre Dame Fighting Irish and the USC Trojans and was drafted by the Washington Spirit in the second round of the 2020 NWSL College Draft. She has also played for the Houston Dash and Liga F club Real Betis.

== Early life ==
Jacobs grew up in Coto de Caza, California. She is the daughter of Jeff and Teresa Jacobs. Her father captained the U.S. Air Force Academy soccer team. Jacobs was a 2013 and 2014 NSCAA Youth All-American. She played club soccer for Slammers FC and graduated from Tesoro High School in 2015.

== College career ==
=== Notre Dame Fighting Irish ===
Jacobs played for Notre Dame 2015–2017. In her freshman season, she played in 20 games and made 15 starts for the Irish. Jacobs scored five goals and notched five assists, including a game-winning assist to beat No. 1 ranked Virginia. She was named to the All-ACC Freshman Team and to TopDrawerSoccer.com's Freshman Best XI Second Team. She sat out the 2016 season to play in the U-20 World Cup with the United States. In 2017, as a redshirt sophomore, she led the Irish in goals, scoring 13 goals and 7 assists. Jacobs also played a team-high of 1,745 minutes, appearing in 22 games for the Irish. She led the ACC in conference goals and was named to the all-ACC second team.

=== USC Trojans ===
Jacobs transferred to the University of Southern California in 2018. At USC, Jacobs scored 9 goals and 11 assists in 2018–2019. As a redshirt junior, she played in all 22 games, making 17 starts for the Trojans. She scored 5 goals and made 2 assists, including a goal in each of her first two games. In her final season, she played in all 23 games and made 21 starts for the Trojans. She scored four goals and led the team with nine assists. The Trojans advanced the quarterfinals of the NCAA quarterfinals where Jacobs scored against the University of North Carolina but ultimately the Tar Heels defeated the Trojans 3–2.

== Club career ==
=== Washington Spirit ===
In the 2020 NWSL College Draft, the Washington Spirit drafted Jacobs with the 13th overall pick. Jacobs made her NWSL debut in the 2020 NWSL Challenge Cup on July 1, 2020. She played in 7 games of the Spirit's 9 games during the abbreviated 2020 season. Overall she earned 5 starts and played a total of 397 minutes. Jacobs signed a new, two-year contract with the Spirit after the 2020 season and she joined the team for preseason in February 2021.

=== Real Betis ===
Jacobs signed with Real Betis in La Liga F in the 2021–2022 season. Jacobs played in Spain for 5 months with 18 appearance for Real Betis Feminas.

=== Houston Dash ===
Jacobs signed a two-year deal with the Houston Dash in 2022. Jacobs had 20 starts in 20 regular season appearances in 2023. In 2023 the Houston Dash had the 3rd best defense in NWSL history and the best in the league in 2023. Jacobs had 10 starts and 15 appearances in 2022 leading to the Dash's first NWSL Playoffs in club history.

=== North Carolina Courage ===
On September 12, 2025, the North Carolina Courage acquired Jacobs from the Dash in exchange for Malia Berkely and $75,000 in intra-league transfer funds. She debuted for the club one week later against the Orlando Pride, entering the match in stoppage-time and making a crucial block to preserve a 1–0 victory. On October 4, she made her first start for the Courage in a 3–1 defeat to Racing Louisville.

The following season, with the departures of Denise O'Sullivan and Kaleigh Kurtz, Jacobs was named club captain as part of the Courage's new leadership group alongside Kailen Sheridan and Ryan Williams. She began the season captaining the Courage to a 2–1 victory over Racing Louisville. The following week, she was substituted out of the match against Gotham FC due to a potential concussion. She missed four months with a head injury and returned on July 25, substituting into a 4–1 defeat to the Utah Royals. On August 8, she scored her first goal for the Courage with the 4–3 stoppage-time winner against her former club Washington Spirit.
