= Ben Gooden =

English football coach (born 1988)

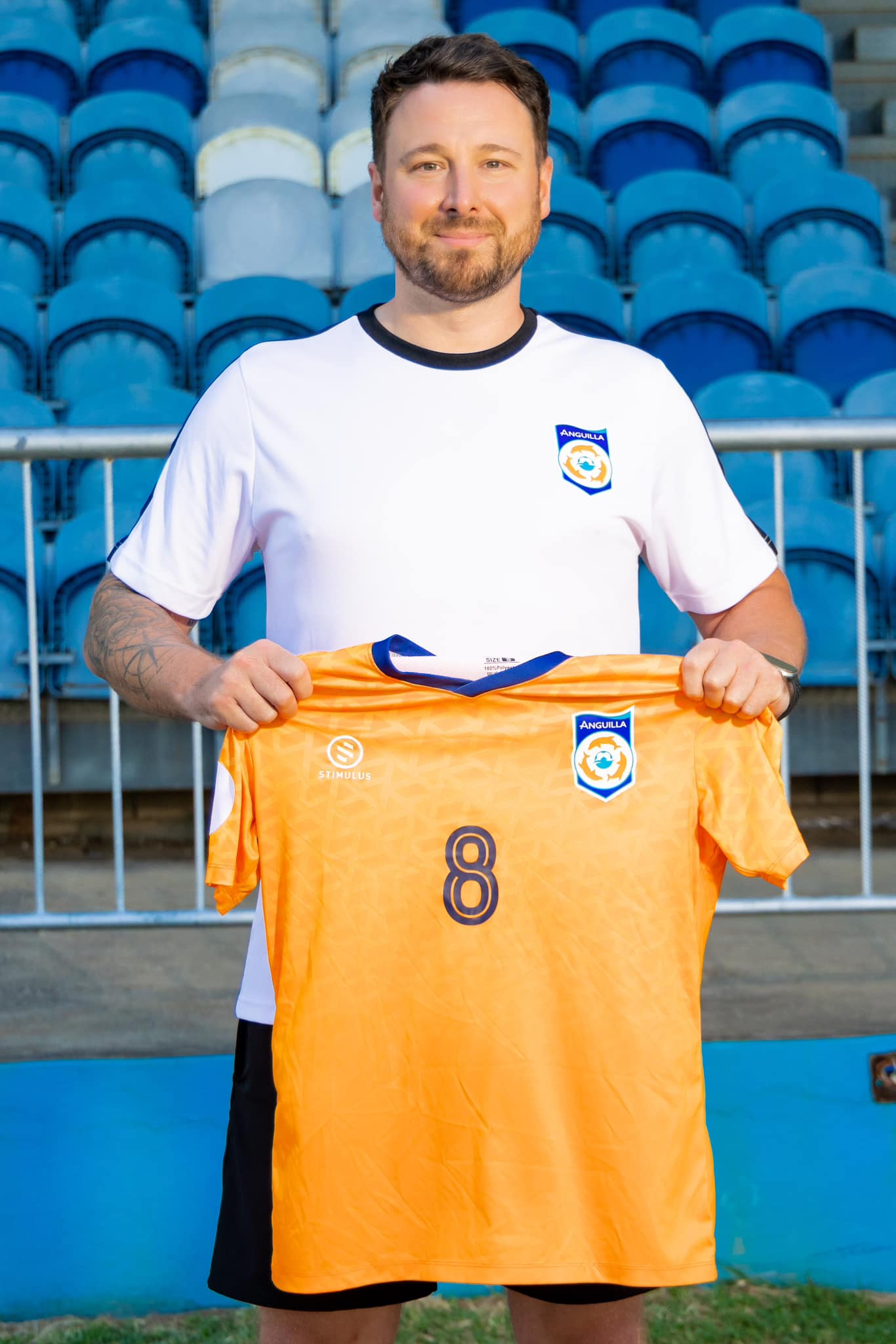
- Gooden announced as Anguilla women's national football team Head Coach in 2023

Personal information
- Full name: Ben Gooden
- Date of birth: 15 January 1988 (age 38)
- Place of birth: Blackburn, England

Team information
- Current team: Anguilla Women (Head Coach)

Managerial career
- Years: Team
- 2017-2020: Blackburn Community Women
- 2020-2022: Chorley Women FC
- 2023-: Anguilla women's national football team

Ben Gooden (born 15 January 1988) is an English football Head Coach who is the current Head Coach of the Senior and U20 Anguilla women's national football team.

== Club career ==
=== Early career ===
Ben was previously the Head Coach of North West Women's Regional Football League side Blackburn CSC and FA Women's National League North side Chorley Women FC when he joined in April 2020. The highlight being the Women's FA Cup run of 2021 where his Chorley side reached the third round of the competition by beating Chester-le-Street Women, Middlesbrough Women, Bradford City Women before being knocked out by league rivals Newcastle United Women. Ben has also previously been a coach at Manchester City's Academy.

== International career ==
Gooden, besides being the head coach of the women's national team also manages the Elite Academy, he also works on educational and development programs like Anguillan women's football.

Gooden's first competitive international matches saw the Anguilla WNT beat Sint Maarten 7-0 and St Kitts and Nevis 3-0. This saw the Anguilla WNT record their first win in 13 years and also set a new high scoring record. These results saw the Anguilla WNT climb 2 places and off the bottom of the FIFA World Ranking table.
