= Eva González (Mexican footballer) =

Mexican footballer (born 1997)

Personal information
- Full name: Eva Beatriz González Tate
- Date of birth: 22 April 1997 (age 29)
- Place of birth: Dallas, Texas, U.S.
- Height: 1.54 m (5 ft 1 in)
- Position: Defensive midfielder

Team information
- Current team: Guadalajara
- Number: 16

Youth career
- Dallas Texans

College career
Years	Team	Apps	(Gls)
2015–2018	Seton Hall Pirates	41	(1)

Senior career*
Years	Team	Apps	(Gls)
2020–2023	América	127	(6)
2024–2025	Juárez	1	(0)
2026–	Guadalajara	5	(0)

International career^{‡}
2014	Mexico U17	4	(0)
2016	Mexico U20	4	(0)
2022–	Mexico	1	(0)
- * Club domestic league appearances and goals as of 1 February 2026 ‡ National team caps and goals as of July 14, 2023

Eva Beatriz González Tate (born 22 April 1997) is a professional footballer who plays as a midfielder for Liga MX Femenil club Guadalajara. Born in the United States, she represents Mexico at international level.

== College career ==
Previous to her professional career, González played college soccer as part of the Seton Hall University's Division 1 Women's Soccer program in South Orange, New Jersey from 2015 to 2018. During her time with the Pirates, González made 41 match appearances and scored one goal.

== Club career ==
=== Club América (2020–2023) ===
González signed her first professional contract with Club América of the Liga MX Femenil in July 2020. González made her professional debut with América on 3 September 2020 in a match against Necaxa for matchday 4 of the Guardianes 2020 tournament.

== International career ==
González made her senior debut for Mexico on 5 September 2022 in a friendly match against New Zealand.

== Honours ==
Club América

- Liga MX Femenil: Clausura 2023
