= Jessie Scarpa =

American soccer player

Personal information
- Full name: Jessie Eleanor Scarpa
- Date of birth: May 17, 1996 (age 30)
- Place of birth: Lakeland, Florida, U.S.
- Height: 5 ft 7 in (1.70 m)
- Position: Forward

College career
| Years | Team | Apps | (Gls) |
| 2014–2018 | North Carolina Tar Heels | 56 | (32) |

Senior career*
| Years | Team | Apps | (Gls) |
| 2019 | Lidköpings FK | 7 | (2) |
| 2020 | Washington Spirit | 0 | (0) |
| 2021 | KIF Örebro | 19 | (4) |

International career
| 2016 | United States U-20 | | |
- * Club domestic league appearances and goals

Jessie Eleanor Scarpa (born May 17, 1996) is an American professional soccer player who plays as a forward playing in Sweden's Damallsvenskan.

== Club career ==
=== Washington Spirit ===
Scarpa made her NWSL debut on September 5, 2020.
