= 2025 CONCACAF Women's U-20 Championship squads =

List of the squads for the 2025 CONCACAF Women's U-20 Championship

This is a list of the squads for the 2025 CONCACAF Women's U-20 Championship in Costa Rica between 29 May and 8 June 2025. The 8 national teams involved in the tournament were required to register a squad of 21 players each, three of whom must be goalkeepers; only players in these squads were eligible to take part in the tournament. Players born on or between 1 January 2006 and 31 December 2010 are eligible to compete.

The age listed for each player is as of 29 May 2025, the first day of the tournament.

Players marked (c) were named as captain for their national squad.

== Group A ==
=== Costa Rica ===
Head coach: Patricia Aguilar

The final squad was announced on 17 May 2025.

No.	Pos.	Player	Date of birth (age)	Club
1	GK	Valeria Fernández	18 March 2008 (aged 17)	(Costa Rican Football Federation) Pococí
13	GK	Génesis Céspedes	1 May 2007 (aged 18)	(Costa Rican Football Federation) Sporting
18	GK	Ashley Quesada	9 June 2009 (aged 15)	(Costa Rican Football Federation) Alajuelense
2	DF	Brittany Vásquez	21 August 2006 (aged 18)	(Costa Rican Football Federation) Dimas Escazú
3	DF	Josselyn Briceño	24 September 2006 (aged 18)	(Argentine Football Association) Talleres
4	DF	Fabiana Alfaro	23 May 2008 (aged 17)	(Costa Rican Football Federation) Alajuelense
5	DF	Tiara Ruiz	18 February 2009 (aged 16)	(Costa Rican Football Federation) Sporting
14	DF	Brittany Castrillo	18 January 2007 (aged 18)	(Costa Rican Football Federation) AD Chorotega
16	DF	Alisha Lindo	28 September 2008 (aged 16)	(Costa Rican Football Federation) Alajuelense
19	DF	Samantha Pitty	19 June 2006 (aged 18)	(Costa Rican Football Federation) Saprissa
6	MF	Valeria Vargas	16 March 2007 (aged 18)	(Costa Rican Football Federation) Sporting
8	MF	Daniela Ocampo	16 July 2008 (aged 16)	(Costa Rican Football Federation) Sporting
15	MF	Jimena Jiménez	27 July 2006 (aged 18)	(Costa Rican Football Federation) Sporting
20	MF	Lucía Paniagua	27 November 2009 (aged 15)	(Costa Rican Football Federation) Sporting
21	MF	Raquel Recio	5 March 2008 (aged 17)	(Costa Rican Football Federation) AD Chorotega
7	FW	Emma Azofeifa	18 May 2009 (aged 16)	(Costa Rican Football Federation) Sporting
9	FW	Keisy Taylor	26 December 2006 (aged 18)	(Costa Rican Football Federation) Dimas Escazú
10	FW	Sheika Scott	22 October 2006 (aged 18)	(Costa Rican Football Federation) Alajuelense
11	FW	Tanicha Thomas	17 November 2006 (aged 18)	(Costa Rican Football Federation) Pococí
12	FW	Alondra González	11 May 2007 (aged 18)	(Costa Rican Football Federation) Tsunami Azul
17	FW	Yeslim Alvarado	13 April 2007 (aged 18)	(Costa Rican Football Federation) Alajuelense

=== Guyana ===
Head coach: Paul DeAbreu

No.	Pos.	Player	Date of birth (age)	Club
1	GK	Kymora Chung	5 October 2007 (aged 17)	(Canadian Soccer Association) Unionville Milliken
18	GK	Alexis Mars	19 April 2010 (aged 15)	(United States Soccer Federation) Stars of Mass
21	GK	Deena Fredericks	16 August 2006 (aged 18)	Unattached
2	DF	Akeelah Vancooten	26 June 2007 (aged 17)	(Guyana Football Federation) Police
3	DF	Heike Clarke	24 January 2007 (aged 18)	(Canadian Soccer Association) Markham
4	DF	Jaida Tucker	1 January 2008 (aged 17)	(Canadian Soccer Association) Ottawa South United
5	DF	Sarah Dasilva	15 May 2007 (aged 18)	(Canadian Soccer Association) Toronto Blizzard
6	DF	Maliya Gangadin	23 September 2007 (aged 17)	(Canadian Soccer Association) Vaughan
14	DF	Liyah Menilek	22 January 2006 (aged 19)	(United States Soccer Federation) Mankato United
16	DF	Shareina Langevine	23 August 2007 (aged 17)	(Canadian Soccer Association) Vaughan
8	MF	Naomi Benjamin	29 September 2008 (aged 16)	(Canadian Soccer Association) Markham
10	MF	Alexis Bayley	14 December 2006 (aged 18)	(Canadian Soccer Association) Durham Lords
11	MF	Allia Henry	29 March 2009 (aged 16)	(Guyana Football Federation) Waramuri Top
12	MF	Anaya Joseph	16 September 2009 (aged 15)	(Canadian Soccer Association) North Mississauga
19	MF	Sydney Glean	22 July 2009 (aged 15)	(Canadian Soccer Association) North Toronto Nitros
7	FW	Myanne Fernandes	16 October 2008 (aged 16)	(Canadian Soccer Association) Pickering
9	FW	Nydel Nelson	19 April 2007 (aged 18)	(Canadian Soccer Association) Markham
13	FW	Devi Sookdeo	25 March 2009 (aged 16)	(United States Soccer Federation) Westchester
15	FW	Kimora Edwards	9 March 2010 (aged 15)	(Guyana Football Federation) President's College
17	FW	Jayda Schoburgh	20 June 2007 (aged 17)	(Canadian Soccer Association) NDC Ontario
20	FW	Se-Hanna Mars	16 May 2006 (aged 19)	(United States Soccer Federation) Stars of Mass

=== Puerto Rico ===
Head coach: (United States) Nathaniel González

The final squad was announced on 13 May 2025.

No.	Pos.	Player	Date of birth (age)	Club
1	GK	Alondra Iriarte	11 April 2006 (aged 19)	(United States Soccer Federation) Green Bay Phoenix
12	GK	Trishelle López	19 May 2007 (aged 18)	(United States Soccer Federation) Florida West
21	GK	Ariana Anderson	13 January 2005 (aged 20)	(United States Soccer Federation) Georgia State Panthers
4	DF	Lauryn Smith	12 June 2007 (aged 17)	(United States Soccer Federation) Florida United
16	DF	Gemma Gillespie	6 February 2006 (aged 19)	(United States Soccer Federation) Butler Bulldogs
20	DF	Ayanna Thelusma	15 July 2005 (aged 19)	(United States Soccer Federation) Gardner–Webb Runnin' Bulldogs
5	MF	Camila Adame	31 January 2009 (aged 16)	(United States Soccer Federation) Florida Elite Soccer Academy
6	MF	Ashley McMahon	18 June 2006 (aged 18)	(United States Soccer Federation) James Madison Dukes
8	MF	Sarah Martínez	29 January 2007 (aged 18)	(United States Soccer Federation) North Carolina Courage
9	MF	Olivia Bevilacqua	13 July 2007 (aged 17)	(United States Soccer Federation) Nationals
10	MF	Maliya Maldonado	29 March 2007 (aged 18)	(United States Soccer Federation) Florida Premier
14	MF	Gabriella Garnett	7 June 2008 (aged 16)	(United States Soccer Federation) Atlanta Fire United
17	MF	Jayla Walton	23 July 2008 (aged 16)	(United States Soccer Federation) PDA Blue
19	MF	Payton Quiñones	22 February 2006 (aged 19)	(United States Soccer Federation) Stetson Hatters
2	FW	Evangelina Arocho	26 June 2007 (aged 17)	(The Football Association) Brooke House
3	FW	Estefanía González	12 May 2006 (aged 19)	(Royal Spanish Football Federation) Madrid CFF
7	FW	Giselle Falcón	12 January 2009 (aged 16)	(United States Soccer Federation) Bethesda
11	FW	Marilia Nieves-Melchor	10 February 2006 (aged 19)	(United States Soccer Federation) Kentucky Wildcats
13	FW	Aurora Gaines	12 February 2006 (aged 19)	(United States Soccer Federation) Arizona Wildcats
15	FW	Analisse Cheema	4 December 2007 (aged 17)	(United States Soccer Federation) RISE
18	FW	Susana Roberts	10 June 2007 (aged 17)	(United States Soccer Federation) Zoo City

=== United States ===
Head coach: Carrie Kveton

The final squad was announced on 16 May 2025.

No.	Pos.	Player	Date of birth (age)	Club
1	GK	Caroline Birkel	25 August 2006 (aged 18)	(United States Soccer Federation) Stanford Cardinal
12	GK	Kealey Titmuss	15 September 2006 (aged 18)	(United States Soccer Federation) Penn State
21	GK	Sonoma Kasica	30 June 2006 (aged 18)	(United States Soccer Federation) Notre Dame
2	DF	Katie Scott	20 June 2007 (aged 17)	(United States Soccer Federation) Kansas City Current
3	DF	Aven Alvarez	4 November 2006 (aged 18)	(United States Soccer Federation) North Carolina
4	DF	Abby Mills	2 November 2006 (aged 18)	(United States Soccer Federation) Notre Dame
5	DF	Bella Ayscue	2 August 2006 (aged 18)	(United States Soccer Federation) Penn State
14	DF	Emma Johnson	20 July 2007 (aged 17)	(United States Soccer Federation) Lexington
15	DF	Leena Powell	3 October 2007 (aged 17)	(United States Soccer Federation) Tuleda
17	DF	Edra Bello	8 June 2007 (aged 17)	(United States Soccer Federation) San Diego Surf
6	MF	Grace Restovich	15 August 2006 (aged 18)	(United States Soccer Federation) Notre Dame
8	MF	Kennedy Fuller	9 March 2007 (aged 18)	(United States Soccer Federation) Angel City
10	MF	Linda Ullmark	21 April 2006 (aged 19)	(United States Soccer Federation) North Carolina
13	MF	Peyton McGovern	5 July 2006 (aged 18)	(United States Soccer Federation) Florida State
16	MF	Kennedy Ring	9 January 2007 (aged 18)	(United States Soccer Federation) World Class
18	MF	Ashlyn Puerta	27 February 2007 (aged 18)	(United States Soccer Federation) Florida State
7	FW	Chloe Ricketts	23 May 2007 (aged 18)	(United States Soccer Federation) Washington Spirit
9	FW	Izzy Engle	20 July 2006 (aged 18)	(United States Soccer Federation) Notre Dame
11	FW	Sealey Strawn	1 October 2007 (aged 17)	(United States Soccer Federation) Dallas Trinity
19	FW	Mary Long	24 January 2007 (aged 18)	(United States Soccer Federation) Kansas City Current
20	FW	Mya Townes	29 July 2007 (aged 17)	(United States Soccer Federation) Georgia Bulldogs

== Group B ==
=== Canada ===
Head coach: Cindy Tye

The final squad was announced on 15 May 2025.

No.	Pos.	Player	Date of birth (age)	Club
1	GK	Noelle Henning	4 February 2007 (aged 18)	(Canadian Soccer Association) NDC Ontario
18	GK	Sofia Cortes-Browne	15 August 2006 (aged 18)	(United States Soccer Federation) Arizona Wildcats
21	GK	Olivia Busby	5 February 2008 (aged 17)	(Canadian Soccer Association) NDC Ontario
3	DF	April Lantaigne	21 April 2006 (aged 19)	(Canadian Soccer Association) AFC Toronto
4	DF	Iba Oching	28 November 2006 (aged 18)	(United States Soccer Federation) Iowa Hawkeyes
5	DF	Janet Okeke	1 March 2006 (aged 19)	(United States Soccer Federation) Florida State women's soccer
12	DF	Inès Nourani	18 May 2007 (aged 18)	(Canadian Soccer Association) CF Montréal Academy
14	DF	Stephanie Schoeley	20 February 2006 (aged 19)	(United States Soccer Federation) Providence Friars
17	DF	Victoria Rocci	9 June 2007 (aged 17)	(Canadian Soccer Association) NDC Ontario
6	MF	Olivia Chisholm	5 December 2008 (aged 16)	(Canadian Soccer Association) NDC Ontario
8	MF	Liana Tarasco	14 April 2007 (aged 18)	(Canadian Soccer Association) CF Montréal Academy
10	MF	Jeneva Hernandez Gray	5 October 2006 (aged 18)	(Portuguese Football Federation) Sporting
13	MF	Teegan Melenhorst	31 August 2007 (aged 17)	(Canadian Soccer Association) NDC Ontario
16	MF	Juliette Perreault	12 February 2007 (aged 18)	(Canadian Soccer Association) CF Montréal Academy
20	MF	Sienna Gibson	18 September 2006 (aged 18)	(Canadian Soccer Association) Altitude
2	FW	Jadea Collin	29 January 2006 (aged 19)	(United States Soccer Federation) Wisconsin Badgers
7	FW	Kaylee Hunter	22 January 2008 (aged 17)	(Canadian Soccer Association) AFC Toronto
9	FW	Annabelle Chukwu	8 February 2007 (aged 18)	(United States Soccer Federation) Notre Dame
11	FW	Léa Larouche	20 January 2006 (aged 19)	(United States Soccer Federation) Butler Bulldogs
15	FW	Adriana Bianchin	10 July 2007 (aged 17)	(Canadian Soccer Association) NDC Ontario
19	FW	Kierra Blundell	13 June 2006 (aged 18)	(United States Soccer Federation) Arizona State Sun Devils

=== Mexico ===
Head coach: (Brazil) Dorival Bueno

The final squad was announced on 26 May 2025.

No.	Pos.	Player	Date of birth (age)	Club
1	GK	Mariángela Medina	9 May 2006 (aged 19)	(United States Soccer Federation) UCLA Bruins
12	GK	Camila Vázquez	17 July 2007 (aged 17)	(Mexican Football Federation) Atlas
21	GK	Valeria Zárate	25 February 2007 (aged 18)	(Mexican Football Federation) Atlético San Luis
2	DF	Michel Fong	2 June 2006 (aged 18)	(Mexican Football Federation) Tijuana
3	DF	Natalia Muñoz	10 March 2007 (aged 18)	(Mexican Football Federation) Tigres
4	DF	Daniela Gallegos	29 May 2007 (aged 18)	(Mexican Football Federation) Toluca
5	DF	Berenice Ibarra	24 October 2008 (aged 16)	(Mexican Football Federation) Pachuca
13	DF	Adrianna González	7 January 2008 (aged 17)	(United States Soccer Federation) Team Boca Blast
20	DF	María González	9 August 2006 (aged 18)	(Mexican Football Federation) Tigres
6	MF	Yareli Valadez	6 April 2006 (aged 19)	(Mexican Football Federation) Pachuca
8	MF	Abril Fragoso	15 May 2007 (aged 18)	(Mexican Football Federation) Pachuca
10	MF	Alice Soto	26 March 2006 (aged 19)	(Mexican Football Federation) Monterrey
14	MF	Alexa Soto	20 March 2007 (aged 18)	(Mexican Football Federation) América
15	MF	Monique Montes	30 August 2007 (aged 17)	(Mexican Football Federation) Monterrey
16	MF	Cristina Montaño	20 December 2007 (aged 17)	(Mexican Football Federation) Mazatlán
7	FW	Dana Sandoval	11 September 2007 (aged 17)	(Mexican Football Federation) Guadalajara
9	FW	Deiry Ramírez	30 June 2006 (aged 18)	(Mexican Football Federation) Tigres
11	FW	Mia Flores	11 July 2006 (aged 18)	(Mexican Football Federation) América
17	FW	Sarahí Ceceña	14 December 2006 (aged 18)	(Mexican Football Federation) Querétaro
18	FW	Carol Acuña	28 November 2007 (aged 17)	(Mexican Football Federation) América
19	FW	Montserrat Saldívar	20 September 2006 (aged 18)	(Mexican Football Federation) América

=== Nicaragua ===
Head coach: Jaime Ruiz

The final squad was announced on 26 May 2025.

No.	Pos.	Player	Date of birth (age)	Club
1	GK	Greta Genie	11 February 2006 (aged 19)	(United States Soccer Federation) Belmont Bruins
12	GK	Violeta Urbina	2 June 2008 (aged 16)	(Nicaraguan Football Federation) Real Estelí
21	GK	Leana Rodríguez	28 October 2006 (aged 18)	(Nicaraguan Football Federation) Leones de Managua
2	DF	Ashlin Ortíz	25 January 2008 (aged 17)	(Nicaraguan Football Federation) Juventus
3	DF	Jennifer Toval	11 September 2006 (aged 18)	(Nicaraguan Football Federation) Leones de Managua
4	DF	Verónica Navarrete	26 February 2007 (aged 18)	(Nicaraguan Football Federation) UNAN
5	DF	Ariana Munguía	12 May 2006 (aged 19)	(Nicaraguan Football Federation) Zacarias Guerra
15	DF	Aura Zeledón	9 March 2006 (aged 19)	(Nicaraguan Football Federation) Real Estelí
18	DF	Angelin Pérez	25 December 2006 (aged 18)	(Nicaraguan Football Federation) Diriangén
20	DF	Natalia Jiménez	1 December 2008 (aged 16)	Unattached
6	MF	Vanessa Altamirano	3 July 2006 (aged 18)	(Nicaraguan Football Federation) Diriangén
10	MF	Jennifer Sarantes	17 May 2007 (aged 18)	(Nicaraguan Football Federation) Real Estelí
7	FW	Adriana Munguía	12 May 2006 (aged 19)	(Nicaraguan Football Federation) Zacarias Guerra
8	FW	Hilary Munguía	10 October 2006 (aged 18)	(Nicaraguan Football Federation) Leones de Managua
9	FW	Perla Garache	1 October 2007 (aged 17)	(Nicaraguan Football Federation) Real Estelí
11	FW	Aneth López	1 September 2007 (aged 17)	(Nicaraguan Football Federation) Leones de Managua
13	FW	Daniela Manzanares	2 June 2006 (aged 18)	(Nicaraguan Football Federation) Real Estelí
14	FW	Jazleen Padilla	6 March 2009 (aged 16)	(United States Soccer Federation) San Francisco Elite Academy
16	FW	Jeanaly Briones	5 January 2008 (aged 17)	(Nicaraguan Football Federation) Real Estelí
17	FW	Maxie Teofilo	5 July 2010 (aged 14)	(United States Soccer Federation) Seattle United
19	FW	Sara Pavón	7 October 2009 (aged 15)	(Nicaraguan Football Federation) San Fernando

=== Panama ===
Head coach: (Spain) Natalia Gutiérrez

The final squad was announced on 26 May 2025.

No.	Pos.	Player	Date of birth (age)	Club
1	GK	Nicolette Más	4 January 2008 (aged 17)	(Panamanian Football Federation) Panamá City
12	GK	Elsa Grant	12 September 2008 (aged 16)	(Panamanian Football Federation) Liga Prov Bocas del Toro
21	GK	Andrielys Crique	11 February 2009 (aged 16)	(Panamanian Football Federation) Atlético Nacional
2	DF	Yasselis Magallón	9 March 2009 (aged 16)	(Panamanian Football Federation) Chorrillo
3	DF	Karla Ovalle	17 January 2008 (aged 17)	(Panamanian Football Federation) Chorrillo
4	DF	Dayane Madrid	30 October 2006 (aged 18)	(Panamanian Football Federation) Chorrillo
5	DF	Jorgelis Serna	22 March 2007 (aged 18)	(Panamanian Football Federation) Santa Fe
13	DF	Cristabella Ríos	22 October 2009 (aged 15)	(Panamanian Football Federation) Panamá City
6	MF	Vitoria Mitre	26 April 2007 (aged 18)	(United States Soccer Federation) Shattuck-Saint Mary's
7	MF	Sherline King	3 March 2006 (aged 19)	(United States Soccer Federation) Jones College Bobcats
8	MF	Kayra Pérez	19 February 2007 (aged 18)	(Panamanian Football Federation) Mario Méndez
15	MF	Guillehely Distancia	11 September 2009 (aged 15)	(Panamanian Football Federation) Umecit
16	MF	Jozuanys Santos	27 June 2008 (aged 16)	(Panamanian Football Federation) Santa Fe
18	MF	Delineth Rivera	8 May 2006 (aged 19)	(Panamanian Football Federation) Chorrillo
20	MF	Helen Lezcano	11 August 2007 (aged 17)	Unattached
9	FW	Nathalie Bello	2 January 2006 (aged 19)	(United States Soccer Federation) Missouri S&T Miners
10	FW	Alison Onodera	3 August 2008 (aged 16)	(Panamanian Football Federation) Veraguas United
11	FW	Kimberly Camarena	26 July 2006 (aged 18)	(Panamanian Football Federation) Veraguas United
14	FW	Shaday Mow	21 August 2009 (aged 15)	(Panamanian Football Federation) Chorrillo
17	FW	Giselle Márquez	5 August 2008 (aged 16)	(United States Soccer Federation) Tampa Bay United
19	FW	Anaí Robles	6 January 2006 (aged 19)	(Panamanian Football Federation) Chorrillo
