= 2025 CONCACAF Women's U-20 Championship qualification =

2025 CONCACAF Women's U-20 Championship Qualifiers
Tournament details
- Host countries: Antigua and Barbuda; Dominican Republic; Nicaragua; Trinidad and Tobago
- Dates: 20 – 25 February 2025
- Teams: 24 (from 1 confederation)

Tournament statistics
- Matches played: 36
- Goals scored: 186 (5.17 per match)
- Top scorer(s): (Canada) Kierra Blundell (Canada) Annabelle Chukwu (Canada) Kaylee Hunter (7 goals each)
- All statistics correct as of 25 February 2025.

The 2025 CONCACAF Women's U-20 Championship qualification competition, was a women's football tournament that was contested by the under-20 women's national teams of the member associations of CONCACAF to decide the participating teams of the 2025 CONCACAF Women's U-20 Championship. The qualifying matches were scheduled between 20 and 25 February 2025. Six teams from this tournament qualified for the 2025 CONCACAF Women's U-20 Championship, joining United States and Mexico, who received byes as the top-ranked teams.

== Draw ==
The preliminary draw took place on 13 November 2024 at the CONCACAF Headquarters in Miami. The teams were seeded based on the CONCACAF Women's U-20 Ranking as of September 23, 2024.

Pot 1	Pot 2	Pot 3	Pot 4
Canada; Costa Rica; Haiti; Jamaica; Puerto Rico; Dominican Republic	El Salvador; Panama; Guyana; Guatemala; Trinidad and Tobago; Nicaragua	Honduras; Bermuda; Cuba; Saint Kitts and Nevis; Cayman Islands; Belize	Saint Vincent and the Grenadines; Antigua and Barbuda; Dominica; U.S. Virgin Islands; Aruba; Bonaire

== Groups ==
Tiebreakers

The ranking of teams in each group was determined as follows:

1. Points obtained in all group matches;
2. Goal difference in all group matches;
3. Number of goals scored in all group matches;
4. Points obtained in the matches played between the teams in question;
5. Goal difference in the matches played between the teams in question;
6. Number of goals scored in the matches played between the teams in question;
7. Fair play points in all group matches;
8. Drawing of lots.

All match times are in ET (UTC-5) with local time in parentheses.

=== Group A ===
Pos	Team	Pld	W	D	L	GF	GA	GD	Pts	Qualification
1	Guyana	3	2	1	0	6	0	+6	7	Final tournament
2	Haiti	3	2	0	1	7	2	+5	6	
3	Antigua and Barbuda (H)	3	1	0	2	6	11	−5	3	
4	Belize	3	0	1	2	3	9	−6	1	

Source: CONCACAF
Rules for classification: Tiebreakers
(H) Hosts
21 February 2025
09:00 (10:00 UTC−4)

Guyana	0–0	Belize
	Report

ABFA Technical Center, St. John's
Referee: Vimarest Díaz (Dominican Republic)
21 February 2025
14:00 (15:00 UTC−4)

Haiti	3–1	Antigua and Barbuda
E. Étienne 17'; Nazon 31', 52'	Report	Allen 9'

ABFA Technical Center, St. John's
Referee: Diana Pérez (Mexico)

23 February 2025
09:00 (10:00 UTC−4)

Belize	0–4	Haiti
	Report	Crèvecoeur 22'; Sainvilus 25', 59'; Nazon 57'

ABFA Technical Center, St. John's
Referee: Moïka Calme (Guadeloupe)
23 February 2025
14:00 (15:00 UTC−4)

Antigua and Barbuda	0–5	Guyana
	Report	Mars 21', 63', 68'; Menilek 78'; Hughes 86' (o.g.)

ABFA Technical Center, St. John's
Referee: Glenda López (Guatemala)

25 February 2025
09:00 (10:00 UTC−4)

Haiti	0–1	Guyana
	Report	Fernandes 57'

ABFA Technical Center, St. John's
Referee: Diana Pérez (Mexico)
25 February 2025
14:00 (15:00 UTC−4)

Belize	3–5	Antigua and Barbuda
Velasquez 36', 79'; B. Pérez 45+1'	Report	Martin 22'; Allen 24'; Acal 28' (o.g.); G. De Suza 38', 90+3'

ABFA Technical Center, St. John's
Referee: Vimarest Díaz (Dominican Republic)

=== Group B ===
Pos	Team	Pld	W	D	L	GF	GA	GD	Pts	Qualification
1	Puerto Rico	3	2	1	0	11	2	+9	7	Final tournament
2	El Salvador	3	2	1	0	9	2	+7	7	
3	Honduras	3	1	0	2	7	4	+3	3	
4	U.S. Virgin Islands	3	0	0	3	0	19	−19	0	

Source: CONCACAF
Rules for classification: Tiebreakers
20 February 2025
15:00 (16:00 UTC−4)

Puerto Rico	6–0	U.S. Virgin Islands
Roberts 2'; Nieves-Melchor 3'; Gillespie 13', 55'; McMahon 51'; Rodríguez 90'	Report

Estadio Félix Sánchez, Santo Domingo, Dominican Republic
Referee: Kedeen Foster (Cayman Islands)
20 February 2025
18:00 (19:00 UTC−4)

El Salvador	1–0	Honduras
J. Torres 50'	Report

Estadio Félix Sánchez, Santo Domingo, Dominican Republic
Referee: Marianela Araya (Costa Rica)

22 February 2025
15:00 (16:00 UTC−4)

Honduras	0–3	Puerto Rico
	Report	McMahon 30' (pen.); Ordóñez 72' (o.g.); Gillespie 80'

Estadio Félix Sánchez, Santo Domingo, Dominican Republic
Referee: Érika González (Mexico)
22 February 2025
18:00 (19:00 UTC−4)

U.S. Virgin Islands	0–6	El Salvador
	Report	Butz 24'; Buerger 42', 90+1'; Alvarenga 54', 80'; Marín 87'

Estadio Félix Sánchez, Santo Domingo, Dominican Republic
Referee: Nathalya Williams (Trinidad and Tobago)

24 February 2025
15:00 (16:00 UTC−4)

Honduras	7–0	U.S. Virgin Islands
Santos 16', 40', 83'; Ferrera 48'; Rodríguez 57', 60'; Gómez 86'	Report

Estadio Félix Sánchez, Santo Domingo, Dominican Republic
Referee: Kedeen Foster (Cayman Islands)
24 February 2025
18:00 (19:00 UTC−4)

Puerto Rico	2–2	El Salvador
McMahon 28'; Cheema 36'	Report	Alvarenga 73'; Villa 80'

Estadio Félix Sánchez, Santo Domingo, Dominican Republic
Referee: Marianela Araya (Costa Rica)

=== Group C ===
Pos	Team	Pld	W	D	L	GF	GA	GD	Pts	Qualification
1	Panama	3	2	1	0	16	1	+15	7	Final tournament
2	Dominican Republic (H)	3	2	1	0	10	1	+9	7	
3	Cuba	3	1	0	2	6	3	+3	3	
4	Bonaire	3	0	0	3	0	27	−27	0	

Source: CONCACAF
Rules for classification: Tiebreakers
(H) Hosts
21 February 2025
15:00 (16:00 UTC−4)

Panama	2–0	Cuba
King 31' (pen.); Onodera 90+3'	Report

Estadio Félix Sánchez, Santo Domingo
Referee: Dilia Bradley (Guatemala)
21 February 2025
18:00 (19:00 UTC−4)

Dominican Republic	8–0	Bonaire
Mercedes 3', 54', 58'; Barker 23'; Espinal 46'; Je. Díaz 49', 52'; Vallecillo 72'	Report

Estadio Félix Sánchez, Santo Domingo
Referee: Saphire Stockman (Costa Rica)

23 February 2025
15:00 (16:00 UTC−4)

Bonaire	0–13	Panama
	Report	Madrid 7'; Onodera 13'; Arosemena 29', 42'; Bello 47', 90+3'; Santos 51'; Mow 60', 69', 85' (pen.); Mitre 72'; Rivera 82'; Ríos 86'

Estadio Félix Sánchez, Santo Domingo
Referee: Francia González (Mexico)
23 February 2025
18:00 (19:00 UTC−4)

Cuba	0–1	Dominican Republic
	Report	Vallecillo 90+4'

Estadio Félix Sánchez, Santo Domingo
Referee: Marjorie Ponce (Nicaragua)

25 February 2025
15:00 (16:00 UTC−4)

Cuba	6–0	Bonaire
Castellanos 43', 67', 90+2'; Lore. Leiva 45+2'; Ortega 83'; Illidge 89' (o.g.)	Report

Estadio Félix Sánchez, Santo Domingo
Referee: Dilia Bradley (Guatemala)
25 February 2025
18:00 (19:00 UTC−4)

Dominican Republic	1–1	Panama
Mercedes 80'	Report	Mow 60'

Estadio Félix Sánchez, Santo Domingo
Referee: Francia González (Mexico)

=== Group D ===
Pos	Team	Pld	W	D	L	GF	GA	GD	Pts	Qualification
1	Nicaragua (H)	3	2	1	0	14	1	+13	7	Final tournament
2	Jamaica	3	2	1	0	12	1	+11	7	
3	Saint Vincent and the Grenadines	3	1	0	2	1	12	−11	3	
4	Saint Kitts and Nevis	3	0	0	3	0	13	−13	0	

Source: CONCACAF
Rules for classification: Tiebreakers
(H) Hosts
20 February 2025
16:00 (15:00 UTC−6)

Jamaica	7–0	Saint Vincent and the Grenadines
Stephenson 15', 45+3', 60'; Av. Johnson 25'; M. Raghunandanan 29'; Cox-McPherson 42'; A. Smith 45'	Report

Estadio Nacional, Managua
Referee: Isabelle Duclos (Canada)
20 February 2025
19:00 (18:00 UTC−6)

Nicaragua	8–0	Saint Kitts and Nevis
Sarantes 5', 43'; Toval 14'; Garache 16'; Manzanares 79', 88'; Pavón 90'; Mesa 90+6'	Report

Estadio Nacional, Managua
Referee: Cecile Hinds (Trinidad and Tobago)

22 February 2025
16:00 (15:00 UTC−6)

Saint Kitts and Nevis	0–4	Jamaica
	Report	Lue 14'; M. Raghunandanan 24', 26'; Powell 45'

Estadio Nacional, Managua
Referee: Génesis de León (Guatemala)
22 February 2025
19:00 (18:00 UTC−6)

Saint Vincent and the Grenadines	0–5	Nicaragua
	Report	Ad. Munguia 14', 69'; Garache 18', 85'; Manzanares 49'

Estadio Nacional, Managua
Referee: Belkis Flores (Honduras)

24 February 2025
16:00 (15:00 UTC−6)

Saint Kitts and Nevis	0–1	Saint Vincent and the Grenadines
	Report	Hunte 90+1'

Estadio Nacional, Managua
Referee: Cecile Hinds (Trinidad and Tobago)
24 February 2025
19:00 (18:00 UTC−6)

Jamaica	1–1	Nicaragua
A. Smith 44'	Report	Ad. Munguia 88'

Estadio Nacional, Managua
Referee: Isabelle Duclos (Canada)

=== Group E ===
Pos	Team	Pld	W	D	L	GF	GA	GD	Pts	Qualification
1	Canada	3	3	0	0	43	0	+43	9	Final tournament
2	Trinidad and Tobago (H)	3	2	0	1	10	12	−2	6	
3	Dominica	3	1	0	2	2	30	−28	3	
4	Bermuda	3	0	0	3	1	14	−13	0	

Source: CONCACAF
Rules for classification: Tiebreakers
(H) Hosts
21 February 2025
15:00 (16:00 UTC−4)

Canada	22–0	Dominica
Larouche 5', 27', 31'; Hunter 7', 22', 45', 54', 61' (pen.); Gibson 9'; Collin 11', 76'; Greco 35'; Chukwu 37', 45+3' (pen.); Blundell 48', 69', 88'; El Mokbel 65', 75', 90', 90+2'; Oching 73'	Report

Ato Boldon Stadium, Couva
Referee: Shandor Wilkinson (Saint Kitts and Nevis)
21 February 2025
18:00 (19:00 UTC−4)

Trinidad and Tobago	3–0	Bermuda
Martin 66', 90+1'; Campbell 78'	Report

Ato Boldon Stadium, Couva
Referee: Odette Hamilton (Jamaica)

23 February 2025
15:00 (16:00 UTC−4)

Bermuda	0–9	Canada
	Report	Hunter 16'; Blundell 18'; Melenhorst 23'; Hernandez Gray 46', 58'; Kettles 65', 90+2'; Chukwu 75', 90+3'

Ato Boldon Stadium, Couva
Referee: Mirian León (El Salvador)
23 February 2025
18:00 (19:00 UTC−4)

Dominica	0–7	Trinidad and Tobago
	Report	Goodridge 12'; Martin 17'; Alexander 24', 31', 66', 71'; Campbell 90+2'

Ato Boldon Stadium, Couva
Referee: Neressa Goldson (Jamaica)

25 February 2025
15:00 (16:00 UTC−4)

Bermuda	1–2	Dominica
Patton 4'	Report	Phillip 11'; Forde 17'

Ato Boldon Stadium, Couva
Referee: Shandor Wilkinson (Saint Kitts and Nevis)
25 February 2025
18:00 (19:00 UTC−4)

Canada	12–0	Trinidad and Tobago
Chukwu 6', 11', 56'; Hunter 8'; Larouche 36'; Perrault 50'; Hernandez Gray 54'; Blundell 71', 85', 90'; Melenhorst 74'; Kettles 90+2'	Report

Ato Boldon Stadium, Couva
Referee: Odette Hamilton (Jamaica)

=== Group F ===
Pos	Team	Pld	W	D	L	GF	GA	GD	Pts	Qualification
1	Costa Rica	3	3	0	0	14	0	+14	9	Final tournament
2	Guatemala	3	1	1	1	5	5	0	4	
3	Aruba	3	1	1	1	3	6	−3	4	
4	Cayman Islands	3	0	0	3	0	11	−11	0	

Source: CONCACAF
Rules for classification: Tiebreakers
20 February 2025
15:00 (16:00 UTC−4)

Costa Rica	4–0	Aruba
Thomas 7'; V. Vargas 83'; Scott 89', 90+3' (pen.)	Report

Ato Boldon Stadium, Couva, Trinidad and Tobago
Referee: Sandra Benítez (El Salvador)
20 February 2025
18:00 (19:00 UTC−4)

Guatemala	3–0	Cayman Islands
F. Álvarez 13'; Fernández 38'; Franco 72'	Report

Ato Boldon Stadium, Couva, Trinidad and Tobago
Referee: Priscila Pérez (Mexico)

22 February 2025
15:00 (16:00 UTC−4)

Cayman Islands	0–7	Costa Rica
	Report	Taylor 2', 45+1'; Scott 7', 30'; Sanabria 37'; Ruiz 56'; Paniagua 88'

Ato Boldon Stadium, Couva, Trinidad and Tobago
Referee: Karitza Guerra (Honduras)
22 February 2025
18:00 (19:00 UTC−4)

Aruba	2–2	Guatemala
Rogers 43', 65'	Report	Fernández 35'; Polanco 89'

Ato Boldon Stadium, Couva, Trinidad and Tobago
Referee: Smeedly Saint-Jean (Haiti)

24 February 2025
15:00 (16:00 UTC−4)

Cayman Islands	0–1	Aruba
	Report	Rogers 59'

Ato Boldon Stadium, Couva, Trinidad and Tobago
Referee: Sandra Benítez (El Salvador)
24 February 2025
18:00 (19:00 UTC−4)

Costa Rica	3–0	Guatemala
A. González 57'; Thomas 68'; Scott 90+1'	Report

Ato Boldon Stadium, Couva, Trinidad and Tobago
Referee: Priscila Pérez (Mexico)

== Goalscorers ==
There were 186 goals scored in 36 matches, for an average of 5.17 goals per match.

7 goals

- (Canada) Kierra Blundell
- (Canada) Annabelle Chukwu
- (Canada) Kaylee Hunter

5 goals

- (Costa Rica) Sheika Scott

4 goals

- (Canada) Natelle El Mokbel
- (Canada) Léa Larouche
- (Dominican Republic) Renata Mercedes
- (Panama) Shaday Mow
- (Trinidad and Tobago) J'Eleisha Alexander

3 goals

- (Aruba) Zyana Rogers
- (Canada) Jeneva Hernandez Gray
- (Canada) Ella Kettles
- (Cuba) Kennys Castellanos
- (El Salvador) Angie Alvarenga
- (Guyana) Se-Hanna Mars
- (Haiti) Pierreline Nazon
- (Honduras) Allanys Santos
- (Jamaica) Alyssa Stephenson
- (Jamaica) Maya Raghunandanan
- (Nicaragua) Perla Garache
- (Nicaragua) Daniela Manzanares
- (Nicaragua) Adriana Munguia
- (Puerto Rico) Gemma Gillespie
- (Puerto Rico) Ashley McMahon
- (Trinidad and Tobago) Orielle Martin

2 goals

- (Antigua and Barbuda) Iressiea Allen
- (Antigua and Barbuda) Gabrielle De Suza
- (Belize) Khalydia Velasquez
- (Canada) Jadea Collin
- (Canada) Teegan Melenhorst
- (Costa Rica) Keisy Taylor
- (Costa Rica) Stacy Thomas
- (Dominican Republic) Jeanery Díaz
- (Dominican Republic) Jaylen Vallecillo
- (El Salvador) Maya Buerger
- (Guatemala) Yaretzy Fernández
- (Haiti) Néhémie Sainvilus
- (Honduras) Anyeli Rodríguez
- (Jamaica) Andrene Smith
- (Nicaragua) Jennifer Sarantes
- (Panama) Analía Arosemena
- (Panama) Nathalie Bello
- (Panama) Alison Onodera
- (Trinidad and Tobago) Madison Campbell

1 goal

- (Antigua and Barbuda) Ajahna Martin
- (Belize) Betsy Pérez
- (Bermuda) Avani Patton
- (Canada) Sienna Gibson
- (Canada) Ava Greco
- (Canada) Iba Oching
- (Canada) Jaime Perrault
- (Costa Rica) Alondra González
- (Costa Rica) Lucía Paniagua
- (Costa Rica) Tiara Ruiz
- (Costa Rica) Fabiana Sanabria
- (Costa Rica) Valeria Vargas
- (Cuba) Lorena Leiva
- (Cuba) Ninel Ortega
- (Dominica) Le-Myah Forde
- (Dominica) Kiyanna Phillip
- (Dominican Republic) Ava Barker
- (Dominican Republic) Sophia Espinal
- (El Salvador) Alexis Butz
- (El Salvador) Makayla Marín
- (El Salvador) Janelle Torres
- (El Salvador) Sarina Villa
- (Guatemala) Fabiola Álvarez
- (Guatemala) Waleska Franco
- (Guatemala) Dina Polanco
- (Guyana) Myanne Fernandes
- (Guyana) Liyah Menilek
- (Haiti) Brianna Crèvecoeur
- (Haiti) Ella Étienne
- (Honduras) Yensi Ferrera
- (Honduras) Karla Gómez
- (Jamaica) Jaileah Cox-McPherson
- (Jamaica) Avery Johnson
- (Jamaica) Una Lue
- (Jamaica) Destiny Powell
- (Nicaragua) Kyrstin Mesa
- (Nicaragua) Sara Pavón
- (Nicaragua) Jennyfer Toval
- (Panama) Sherline King
- (Panama) Dayane Madrid
- (Panama) Vitoria Mitre
- (Panama) Cristabella Ríos
- (Panama) Delineth Rivera
- (Panama) Jozuanys Santos
- (Puerto Rico) Analisse Cheema
- (Puerto Rico) Marilia Nieves-Melchor
- (Puerto Rico) Susana Roberts
- (Puerto Rico) Amanda Rodríguez
- (Trinidad and Tobago) Hackeemar Goodridge
- (Saint Vincent and the Grenadines) Stephanie Hunte

1 own goal

- (Antigua and Barbuda) Karmiellia Hughes (against Guyana)
- (Belize) Riann Acal (against Antigua and Barbuda)
- (Bonaire) Gabriela Illidge (against Cuba)
- (Honduras) Evelin Ordóñez (against Puerto Rico)

== Qualified teams ==
The following eight teams qualified for the final tournament.

Team	Qualified as	Qualified on	Previous appearances in CONCACAF Women's U-20 Championship^{1}
Mexico	Automatic qualifiers	31 October 2024	12 (**2002**, 2004, 2006, 2008, 2010, 2012, 2014, 2015, **2018**, 2020, 2022, **2023**)
United States	Automatic qualifiers	31 October 2024	12 (**2002**, 2004, **2006**, 2008, **2010**, **2012**, **2014**, **2015**, 2018, **2020**, **2022**, 2023)
Guyana	Group A Winners	25 February 2025	2 (2020, 2022)
Puerto Rico	Group B Winners	24 February 2025	3 (2020, 2022, 2023)
Panama	Group C Winners	25 February 2025	7 (2002, 2004, 2006, 2012, 2015, 2022, 2023)
Nicaragua	Group D Winners	24 February 2025	4 (2008, 2018, 2020, 2022)
Canada	Group E Winners	25 February 2025	10 (**2004**, 2006, **2008**, 2010, 2012, 2015, 2018, 2020, 2022, 2023)
Costa Rica	Group F Winners	24 February 2025	7 (2002, 2004, 2008, 2010, 2014, 2018, 2023)

^{1} Bold indicates champions for that year. Italic indicates hosts for that year.
