= 2008 CONCACAF Women's U-20 Championship squads =

List of the squads for the 2008 CONCACAF Women's U-20 Championship

This is a list of the squads for the 2008 CONCACAF Under-20 Women's Championship, which was held in Mexico between June 17 and June 28, 2008. The 8 national teams involved in the tournament were required to register a squad of 20 players each, two of whom must be goalkeepers; only players in these squads were eligible to take part in the tournament.

== Group A ==
=== Cuba ===
Coach: (Cuba) Rufino Sotolongo

No.	Pos.	Player	Date of birth (age)	Club
1	GK	Katherine Montesino	17 January 1992 (aged 16)	(Football Association of Cuba) Ciudad Habana
12	GK	Lucylena Martínez	28 May 1991 (aged 17)	(Football Association of Cuba) Ciudad Habana
13	GK	Katherine Montesino	14 January 1988 (aged 20)	(Football Association of Cuba) Villa Clara
4	DF	Yamara López	18 August 1990 (aged 17)	(Football Association of Cuba) Villa Clara
5	DF	Yadira Rodríguez	25 July 1989 (aged 18)	(Football Association of Cuba) Ciudad Habana
6	DF	Jessica Álvarez	12 September 1990 (aged 17)	(Football Association of Cuba) Camagüey
7	DF	Yamisleidy Chacón	6 September 1989 (aged 18)	(Football Association of Cuba) Ciudad Habana
8	DF	Yezenia Gallardo	28 June 1991 (aged 16)	(Football Association of Cuba) Ciudad Habana
9	MF	Yudisleivi Hernández	8 January 1992 (aged 16)	(Football Association of Cuba) Ciudad Habana
10	MF	Yareni Fuentes	30 January 1991 (aged 17)	(Football Association of Cuba) Granma
11	MF	Rachel Peláez	5 May 1993 (aged 15)	(Football Association of Cuba) Camagüey
15	MF	Yoanna Valdés	1 August 1989 (aged 18)	(Football Association of Cuba) Ciudad Habana
16	MF	Yaimara Aguilar	19 July 1989 (aged 18)	(Football Association of Cuba) Ciudad Habana
17	MF	Yaima Hernández	16 February 1991 (aged 17)	(Football Association of Cuba) Ciudad Habana
18	MF	Yudisleivi Reyes	10 April 1989 (aged 19)	(Football Association of Cuba) Ciudad Habana
20	MF	Yisel Rodríguez	30 January 1989 (aged 19)	(Football Association of Cuba) Ciudad Habana
3	FW	Leodana Bejerano	13 April 1990 (aged 18)	(Football Association of Cuba) Ciudad Habana
14	FW	Leidy Carpio	23 April 1989 (aged 19)	(Football Association of Cuba) Ciudad Habana

=== Mexico ===
Coach: (Mexico) Andrea Rodebaugh

No.	Pos.	Player	Date of birth (age)	Club
1	GK	Erika Vanegas	7 July 1988 (aged 19)	
12	GK	Wendy Espejel	3 July 1990 (aged 17)	(United States Soccer Federation) OJFC Barcelona
2	DF	Wendoline Ortiz	14 August 1989 (aged 18)	(Mexican Football Federation) Universidad de Colima
4	DF	Ana Gomez	24 July 1988 (aged 19)	(Mexican Football Federation) Andrea's Soccer
13	DF	Susana Mendoza	24 January 1988 (aged 20)	(United States Soccer Federation) Cerritos College
14	DF	Valeria Hernández	22 August 1990 (aged 17)	(Mexican Football Federation) Club Laguna
5	MF	Janet Méndez	24 August 1988 (aged 19)	(United States Soccer Federation) California State University, Long Beach
6	MF	María Martínez	11 March 1988 (aged 20)	(Mexican Football Federation) Universidad de Guadalajara
7	MF	Yalú Mondragón	18 March 1990 (aged 18)	(Mexican Football Federation) Pachuca
17	MF	Tamara Romero	22 October 1990 (aged 17)	(Mexican Football Federation) Andrea's Soccer
19	MF	Iliana Palma	11 May 1988 (aged 20)	(Mexican Football Federation) Andrea's Soccer
23	MF	Liliana Mercado	22 October 1988 (aged 19)	(Mexican Football Federation) Andrea's Soccer
27	MF	Liliana Godoy	21 June 1990 (aged 17)	(Mexican Football Federation) Cruz Azul Hidalgo
8	FW	Alejandra Torres	29 September 1989 (aged 18)	(Mexican Football Federation) Club Laguna
9	FW	Charlyn Corral	11 September 1991 (aged 16)	(Mexican Football Federation) Andrea's Soccer
10	FW	Dinora Garza	24 January 1988 (aged 20)	(Mexican Football Federation) Universidad Autónoma de Nuevo León
11	FW	Stephany Mayor	23 September 1991 (aged 16)	(Mexican Football Federation) Club Laguna
16	FW	Rosaura Gallegos	2 July 1990 (aged 17)	(Mexican Football Federation) Potros Toluca
18	FW	Claudia García	19 July 1988 (aged 19)	(Mexican Football Federation) FC Azteca
21	FW	Inglis Hernández	17 September 1990 (aged 17)	(Mexican Football Federation) Stars Soccer

=== Trinidad and Tobago ===
Coach: (Trinidad and Tobago) Marlon Charles

No.	Pos.	Player	Date of birth (age)	Club
1	GK	Kimika Forbes	28 August 1990 (aged 17)	(Trinidad and Tobago Football Association) Bellaforma Angels
20	GK	Julie Mcdougall	18 October 1989 (aged 18)	
22	GK	Alexis Chughan	15 February 1988 (aged 20)	
2	DF	Ayana Russell	16 March 1988 (aged 20)	(Trinidad and Tobago Football Association) Joe Public
3	DF	Danielle Blair	16 June 1988 (aged 20)	
5	DF	Annalis Cummings	2 October 1989 (aged 18)	(Trinidad and Tobago Football Association) Joe Public
6	DF	Kenya Charles	10 March 1988 (aged 20)	(Trinidad and Tobago Football Association) Joe Public
8	DF	Iyesha Ollivierre	3 July 1990 (aged 17)	
18	DF	Jennelle Cunningham	29 April 1990 (aged 18)	(Trinidad and Tobago Football Association) Real Dimensions FC
4	MF	Kasara Gardner	6 August 1989 (aged 18)	(Trinidad and Tobago Football Association) Joe Public
7	MF	Dernelle Mascall	20 October 1988 (aged 19)	(United States Soccer Federation) Rochester Rhinos
10	MF	Avanell Isaac	19 April 1990 (aged 18)	(Trinidad and Tobago Football Association) Joe Public
11	MF	Karissa Rodney	19 October 1990 (aged 17)	(The Football Association) Colchester United
12	MF	Bianca Walker	5 October 1988 (aged 19)	(Trinidad and Tobago Football Association) Real Dimensions FC
14	MF	Avhlen White	27 June 1989 (aged 18)	
15	MF	Nikeisha Noel	28 August 1989 (aged 18)	(Trinidad and Tobago Football Association) Petrotrin
16	MF	Candace Edwards	16 November 1989 (aged 18)	(Trinidad and Tobago Football Association) Bellaforma Angels
9	FW	Shanelle Warrick	21 May 1990 (aged 18)	(Trinidad and Tobago Football Association) San Juan Jabloteh
13	FW	Arielle Ramchand-Duquesnay	7 March 1990 (aged 18)	(Trinidad and Tobago Football Association) Joe Public
19	FW	Kennya Cordner	11 November 1988 (aged 19)	(United States Soccer Federation) Northampton Laurels

=== United States ===
Coach: (United States) Tony DiCicco

No.	Pos.	Player	Date of birth (age)	Club
1	GK	Alyssa Naeher	20 April 1988 (aged 20)	(United States Soccer Federation) Pennsylvania State University
18	GK	Kristin Arnold	5 June 1988 (aged 20)	(United States Soccer Federation) Texas A&M University
2	DF	Lauren Fowlkes	6 July 1988 (aged 19)	(United States Soccer Federation) University of Notre Dame
3	DF	Meghan Klingenberg	2 August 1988 (aged 19)	(United States Soccer Federation) University of North Carolina
4	DF	Nicola Marshall	2 June 1988 (aged 20)	(United States Soccer Federation) University of Colorado
6	DF	Elli Reed	10 August 1989 (aged 18)	(United States Soccer Federation) University of Portland
8	DF	Kaley Fountain	1 July 1988 (aged 19)	(United States Soccer Federation) Wake Forest University
5	MF	Keelin Winters	9 December 1988 (aged 19)	
9	MF	Gina DiMartino	31 July 1988 (aged 19)	(United States Soccer Federation) Boston College
11	MF	Christine Nairn	25 September 1990 (aged 17)	(United States Soccer Federation) Freestate Shooters
13	MF	Michelle Enyeart	26 July 1988 (aged 19)	(United States Soccer Federation) University of Portland
21	MF	Ingrid Wells	29 March 1989 (aged 19)	(United States Soccer Federation) Georgetown University
25	MF	Becky Edwards	22 May 1988 (aged 20)	(United States Soccer Federation) Florida State University
7	FW	Nikki Washington	1 August 1988 (aged 19)	(United States Soccer Federation) University of North Carolina
10	FW	Kelley O'Hara	4 August 1988 (aged 19)	(United States Soccer Federation) Stanford University
14	FW	Jessica McDonald	28 February 1988 (aged 20)	(United States Soccer Federation) Phoenix College
15	FW	Casey Nogueira	23 February 1989 (aged 19)	(United States Soccer Federation) University of North Carolina
17	FW	Alex Morgan	2 July 1989 (aged 18)	
19	FW	Kiersten Dallstream	5 March 1988 (aged 20)	(United States Soccer Federation) Washington State University
22	FW	Sydney Leroux	7 May 1990 (aged 18)	

== Group B ==
=== Canada ===
Coach: (Canada) Bob Birarda

No.	Pos.	Player	Date of birth (age)	Club
1	GK	Justine Bernier	20 March 1989 (aged 19)	
18	GK	Erin McNulty	3 June 1989 (aged 19)	
22	GK	Stephanie Panozzo	19 May 1989 (aged 19)	(Canadian Soccer Association) Vancouver Whitecaps
2	DF	Allysha Chapman	25 January 1989 (aged 19)	
3	DF	Alexandra Marton	28 April 1990 (aged 18)	
4	DF	Shannon Woeller	13 March 1990 (aged 18)	(Canadian Soccer Association) Vancouver Whitecaps
5	DF	Myriam Bouchard	8 February 1989 (aged 19)	
19	DF	Nicole Mailloux	14 April 1988 (aged 20)	
6	MF	Chelsea Stewart	28 April 1990 (aged 18)	
7	MF	Rheanne Sleiman	26 September 1989 (aged 18)	
8	MF	Paige Adams	6 March 1990 (aged 18)	(Canadian Soccer Association) Vancouver Whitecaps
9	MF	Monica Lam-Feist	31 January 1991 (aged 17)	(Canadian Soccer Association) Vancouver Whitecaps
11	MF	Kaylyn Kyle	6 October 1988 (aged 19)	(Canadian Soccer Association) Vancouver Whitecaps
12	MF	Sophie Schmidt	28 June 1988 (aged 19)	(United States Soccer Federation) University of Portland
13	MF	Karla Schacher	17 November 1988 (aged 19)	
17	MF	Taryne Boudreau	21 September 1989 (aged 18)	
10	FW	Jodi-Ann Robinson	17 April 1989 (aged 19)	(Canadian Soccer Association) Vancouver Whitecaps
14	FW	Julie Armstrong	3 December 1990 (aged 17)	(Canadian Soccer Association) Vancouver Whitecaps
15	FW	Jonelle Filigno	24 September 1990 (aged 17)	
16	FW	Tina Romagnuolo	2 March 1990 (aged 18)	(Canadian Soccer Association) Toronto Lady Lynx

=== Costa Rica ===
Coach: (Costa Rica) Juan Diego Quesada

No.	Pos.	Player	Date of birth (age)	Club
1	GK	Priscilla Tapia	2 May 1991 (aged 17)	(Costa Rican Football Federation) Puntarenas
18	GK	Maria Alejandra Arias	4 May 1991 (aged 17)	(Costa Rican Football Federation) UCEM
2	DF	Gabriela Guillén	1 March 1992 (aged 16)	(Costa Rican Football Federation) San José
3	DF	María Isabel Barquero	7 January 1992 (aged 16)	(Costa Rican Football Federation) San José
4	DF	Sharon González	5 September 1989 (aged 18)	(Costa Rican Football Federation) Puntarenas
5	DF	Adriana Rodriguez	12 May 1989 (aged 19)	
6	DF	Fabiola Sánchez	9 April 1993 (aged 15)	(Costa Rican Football Federation) UCEM
9	DF	Paola Alvarado	6 January 1990 (aged 18)	(Costa Rican Football Federation) UCEM
12	DF	Daniela Cruz	8 March 1991 (aged 17)	(Costa Rican Football Federation) Sportek
19	DF	Wendy Acosta	19 December 1989 (aged 18)	(Costa Rican Football Federation) Sportek
7	MF	Priscilla Torres	15 December 1988 (aged 19)	(Costa Rican Football Federation) UCEM
10	MF	Katherine Alvarado	11 April 1991 (aged 17)	(Costa Rican Football Federation) San José
13	MF	Jacqueline Mata	14 October 1991 (aged 16)	(Costa Rican Football Federation) UCEM
14	MF	Silvia Betancourt	8 September 1989 (aged 18)	
15	MF	Cristin Granados	19 August 1989 (aged 18)	(Costa Rican Football Federation) Arenal
16	MF	Yuliana Rodriguez	12 November 1989 (aged 18)	(Costa Rican Football Federation) UCEM
8	FW	Mónica Malavassi	25 April 1989 (aged 19)	(Costa Rican Football Federation) Arenal
11	FW	Raquel Rodríguez	28 October 1993 (aged 14)	(Costa Rican Football Federation) San José
17	FW	Adriana Venegas	12 June 1989 (aged 19)	(Costa Rican Football Federation) San José
19	FW	Maria Vanessa Fuentes	19 November 1989 (aged 18)	

=== Jamaica ===
Coach: (Brazil) Luciano Gama

No.	Pos.	Player	Date of birth (age)	Club
1	GK	Nicole McClure	16 November 1989 (aged 18)	
13	GK	Nicoda Linton	28 May 1989 (aged 19)	(Jamaica Football Federation) St. Catherine Upliftment
7	DF	Marcillee McBean	12 March 1989 (aged 19)	(Jamaica Football Federation) St. Catherine Upliftment
8	DF	Shanise Steele	15 September 1988 (aged 19)	(Jamaica Football Federation) St. Catherine Upliftment
10	DF	Christina Murray	8 October 1989 (aged 18)	(Jamaica Football Federation) Waterhouse
12	DF	Zovel Hyre	20 May 1991 (aged 17)	(Canadian Soccer Association) Wexford SC
17	DF	Monique Pryce	18 May 1991 (aged 17)	(Jamaica Football Federation) Maverley
18	DF	J'Vonelle Simpson	19 April 1990 (aged 18)	(Jamaica Football Federation) Harbour View
22	DF	Abegail Walker	8 November 1990 (aged 17)	
2	MF	Jody Bethune	30 September 1989 (aged 18)	
6	MF	Natasha Douglas	27 February 1990 (aged 18)	(Jamaica Football Federation) Harbour View
9	MF	Peta-Gaye Soman	6 June 1988 (aged 20)	(Jamaica Football Federation) Harbour View
11	MF	Kimmia Parker	2 February 1989 (aged 19)	(Jamaica Football Federation) Lindsey Wilson College
15	MF	Cathryn Rogers	22 May 1991 (aged 17)	
4	FW	Semone Honeghan	23 February 1990 (aged 18)	(Jamaica Football Federation) Lennon High School
5	FW	Kenesha Reid	19 November 1989 (aged 18)	(Jamaica Football Federation) Barbican
14	FW	Teashian Thomas	9 March 1990 (aged 18)	(Jamaica Football Federation) Waterhouse
16	FW	Kemesha Woodfine	25 October 1990 (aged 17)	(United States Soccer Federation) Baylor School
19	FW	Shakira Duncan	10 January 1989 (aged 19)	(United States Soccer Federation) Oral Roberts University

=== Nicaragua ===
Coach: (Nicaragua) Eduardo Urroz

No.	Pos.	Player	Date of birth (age)	Club
1	GK	Jennifer Fernández	5 April 1988 (aged 20)	(Nicaraguan Football Federation) Deportivo Colocho
12	GK	Bethania Aburto	5 February 1990 (aged 18)	(Nicaraguan Football Federation) CUUN León
2	DF	Martha Silva	11 October 1992 (aged 15)	(Nicaraguan Football Federation) CUUN León
3	DF	Xaviera Morales	22 September 1988 (aged 19)	(Nicaraguan Football Federation) UNAN Managua
5	DF	Oneyda Merlo	10 February 1989 (aged 19)	(Nicaraguan Football Federation) CUUN León
6	DF	Melissa Manzanares	26 September 1993 (aged 14)	(Nicaraguan Football Federation) Diriangén
7	DF	Jennifer Leiva	10 November 1991 (aged 16)	(Nicaraguan Football Federation) Deportivo Colocho
8	DF	Nora Miranda	13 August 1989 (aged 18)	(Nicaraguan Football Federation) CUUN León
13	DF	Jessica Morales	19 August 1991 (aged 16)	(Nicaraguan Football Federation) CUUN León
14	DF	Gema Zúñiga	31 March 1993 (aged 15)	(Nicaraguan Football Federation) Deportivo Colocho
18	DF	Jennyfer Canales	11 January 1990 (aged 18)	(Nicaraguan Football Federation) Deportivo Colocho
19	DF	Scarleth Amador	15 April 1988 (aged 20)	(Nicaraguan Football Federation) UNAN Managua
9	MF	Ana Delgado	26 July 1991 (aged 16)	(Nicaraguan Football Federation) CUUN León
10	MF	Maryury Pérez	4 June 1990 (aged 18)	(Nicaraguan Football Federation) UNAN Managua
11	MF	Merly Hernández	16 September 1991 (aged 16)	(Nicaraguan Football Federation) Diriangén
15	MF	Maritza Osorio	29 May 1989 (aged 19)	(Nicaraguan Football Federation) UNAN Managua
4	FW	Julissa Acevedo	7 August 1991 (aged 16)	(Nicaraguan Football Federation) UAM
16	FW	Wendy Flores	24 March 1994 (aged 14)	(Nicaraguan Football Federation) UAM
17	FW	Yansy Aguirre	18 February 1991 (aged 17)	(Nicaraguan Football Federation) Diriangén
20	FW	María Quijano	1 December 1989 (aged 18)	(Nicaraguan Football Federation) Deportivo Colocho
