= Dorival Bueno =

Brazilian football manager (born 1968)

Personal information
- Full name: Dorival Bueno dos Santos Pacheco
- Date of birth: 29 May 1968 (age 58)
- Place of birth: Jaú, Brazil

Managerial career
- Years: Team
- 2005: XV de Jaú U-20
- 2006: XV de Jaú
- 2007: São Carlos
- 2008–2014: XV de Jaú
- 2014–2018: Brazil U20 (women)
- 2018–2021: Peru (women)
- 2023–2025: Nicaragua (women)
- 2025–2026: Mexico U-20 (women)

Dorival Bueno dos Santos Pacheco (born 29 May 1968), sometimes known as his nickname Doriva Bueno is a Brazilian football manager for the Mexico women's national under-20 team.

== Football player ==
Dorival Bueno was a football player. He played for XV de Jaú in 1999.

== Club manager ==
He began his career as a coach with the team he had played for. He started by managing the U-20 team on 2005 before managing the XV de Jaú senior team. He also was a coach for São Carlos on 2007.

== National team manager ==
He was the head coach for Brazil U-20 women's national team and participated in 2014 FIFA U-20 Women's World Cup in Canada, 2016 FIFA U-20 Women's World Cup in Papua New Guinea and 2018 FIFA U-20 Women's World Cup in France.

During 2018-2021 he was selected to coach the Peruvian women's national team.

On 2023 he was named the head coach of Nicaragua women's national team.

Currently he is the head coach of Mexico U-20 women's team, having won the silver medal in the 2025 CONCACAF Women's U-20 Championship.

== Honours ==
Result	Team	Tournament
1st place, gold medalist(s)	Brazil U-20 women's	2015 South American U-20 Women's Championship
1st place, gold medalist(s)	Brazil U-20 women's	2018 South American U-20 Women's Championship
2nd place, silver medalist(s)	Mexico U-20 women's	2025 CONCACAF Women's U-20 Championship
