= Noelle Henning =

Canadian soccer player (born 2007)

- Henning with the Canada U20 in 2025

Personal information
- Date of birth: February 4, 2007 (age 19)
- Place of birth: Oakville, Ontario, Canada
- Height: 1.80 m (5 ft 11 in)
- Position: Goalkeeper

Team information
- Current team: Michigan State Spartans

Youth career
- Milton YSC

College career
Years	Team	Apps	(Gls)
2025–	Michigan State Spartans	23	(0)

Senior career*
Years	Team	Apps	(Gls)
2022–2024	NDC Ontario		

International career
2022	Canada U17		
2023–	Canada U20		
Medal record
Women's soccer
Representing Canada
CONCACAF Women's U-20 Championship
Gold medal – first place	2025 Costa Rica
Bronze medal – third place	2023 Dominican Republic
- * Club domestic league appearances and goals

Noelle Henning (born February 4, 2007) is a Canadian college soccer player who plays as a goalkeeper for the Michigan State Spartans and the Canada under-20 national team.

Henning developed at Canada Soccer's National Development Centre in Ontario, whose women's team she helped win the League1 Ontario title in 2022 and 2024; in 2024 she was named the league's Goalkeeper of the Year. She joined Michigan State in 2025 and started throughout her freshman season, receiving weekly Big Ten Conference honours as the Spartans finished as runners-up in the Big Ten tournament and reached the NCAA tournament quarterfinals for the first time in the program's history.

At youth international level, Henning was part of Canada's squads at the 2022 FIFA U-17 Women's World Cup and the 2024 FIFA U-20 Women's World Cup. She was named best goalkeeper of the 2025 CONCACAF Women's U-20 Championship, which Canada won for the first time since 2008, and was the team's goalkeeper as it reached the quarterfinals of the 2026 FIFA U-20 Women's World Cup.

== Early life ==
Henning grew up in Milton, Ontario, and began playing soccer at the age of five with Milton YSC. Born in Oakville to a father from Germany, she speaks English and German, and also played basketball, volleyball and track as a child. She attended Craig Kielburger Secondary School in Milton.

== College career ==
Henning joined Michigan State in 2025 and made her college debut in the season opener against Colorado on August 14, before recording her first shutout a week later against NC State. On September 30, she was named the Big Ten Freshman of the Week after a 2–1 win at Minnesota and a 6–0 home win over 20th-ranked Wisconsin, in which she stopped seven of the eight shots she faced. A shutout of Indiana on October 16 earned her the conference's Goalkeeper of the Week award. She started all 21 of her appearances as a freshman, and her eight shutouts were the fifth-most by a Michigan State goalkeeper in a single season.

Michigan State reached the final of the 2025 Big Ten women's soccer tournament at Energizer Park in St. Louis on November 9, where Henning made four saves in a 1–1 draw with Washington before the Spartans lost the penalty shoot-out 4–2. In the NCAA tournament, she made a career-high seven saves in a 2–1 win over Colorado on November 23 that took Michigan State to the quarterfinals for the first time. The Spartans' season ended five days later with a 5–1 defeat to top-ranked Stanford.

Henning started Michigan State's first two matches of the 2026 season and kept a clean sheet in both, before leaving the team for about a month to play for Canada at the U-20 World Cup.

== Club career ==
As a teenager, Henning trained at Canada Soccer's National Development Centre in Ontario (NDC Ontario), where she was coached by Joey Lombardi, Tania Singfield and Melissa Briggs. NDC Ontario's women's team competed in League1 Ontario, and Henning was part of the side that won the league's playoff championship in 2022. In 2023, NDC Ontario finished first in the regular season but lost the final 2–1 after extra time to Alliance United FC at the Ontario Soccer Centre in Vaughan. NDC Ontario won the 2024 Premier Division title, and Henning was named the league's Goalkeeper of the Year and a first-team All-Star.

== International career ==
=== Early youth career ===
Henning has represented Canada at youth level since 2022. That year she was a member of the under-17 squads at the 2022 CONCACAF Women's U-17 Championship and the 2022 FIFA U-17 Women's World Cup in India. She moved up to the under-20 team for the 2023 CONCACAF Women's U-20 Championship, at which Canada finished third, and was named to the squad for the 2024 FIFA U-20 Women's World Cup in Colombia, where Canada were eliminated in the round of 16.

=== 2025 CONCACAF title ===
Henning started five matches for Canada at the 2025 CONCACAF Women's U-20 Championship in Alajuela, Costa Rica, making 16 saves. By reaching the semifinals, Canada qualified for the 2026 FIFA U-20 Women's World Cup in Poland. On June 8, 2025, Canada beat Mexico 3–2 after extra time in the final at the Estadio Alejandro Morera Soto, winning the championship for the third time and the first time since 2008. Henning was named the tournament's best goalkeeper and was selected in its Best XI.

=== 2026 U-20 World Cup ===
On August 20, 2026, Henning was named to Canada's 21-player squad for the World Cup. She was in goal for Canada's opening match, a 1–1 draw with England at the Bielsko-Biała Stadium on September 5. Canada reached the quarterfinals for the fourth time in the program's history, where they met the defending champions, North Korea, at the Władysław Król Municipal Stadium in Łódź on September 20. Henning made seven saves, the most by a Canadian goalkeeper at the tournament, but North Korea scored twice in stoppage time to win 2–0.

== Personal life ==
Henning's older brother, Niklas, is a Canadian football offensive tackle who played at Queen's University. He was selected second overall by the Toronto Argonauts in the 2026 CFL draft and signed with the Las Vegas Raiders of the National Football League in May 2026.

== Honours ==
NDC Ontario

- League1 Ontario: 2022, 2024
- League1 Ontario regular season: 2023

Michigan State Spartans

- Big Ten women's soccer tournament runner-up: 2025

Canada U20

- CONCACAF Women's U-20 Championship: 2025; third place: 2023

Individual

- CONCACAF Women's U-20 Championship best goalkeeper: 2025
- CONCACAF Women's U-20 Championship Best XI: 2025
- League1 Ontario Goalkeeper of the Year: 2024
- League1 Ontario First Team All-Star: 2024
