= Inglis Hernández =

Mexican footballer (born 1990)

Personal information
- Full name: Inglis Yoana Hernández Toledo
- Date of birth: 17 September 1990 (age 36)
- Place of birth: Mazatlán, Sinaloa, Mexico
- Height: 1.56 m (5 ft 1 in)
- Position: Attacking midfielder

Senior career*
Years	Team	Apps	(Gls)
2017–2026	Tijuana	233	(16)

International career
2006–2007	Mexico U-17		
2007–2008	Mexico U-20		
- * Club domestic league appearances and goals as of 9 February 2926

Inglis Yoana Hernández Toledo (born 17 September 1990) is a Mexican professional football midfielder who plays for Tijuana of the Liga MX Femenil.
