= Janet Okeke =

Canadian soccer player (born 2006)

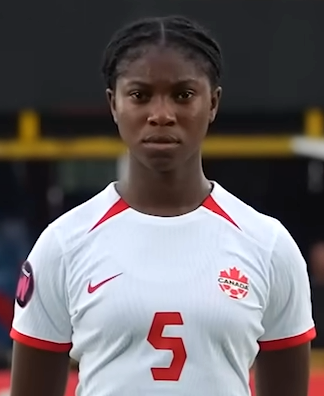
- Okeke with Canada at the 2025 CONCACAF Women's U-20 Championship

Personal information
- Full name: Janet Chidinma Kalu Okeke
- Date of birth: March 1, 2006 (age 20)
- Place of birth: Montreal, Quebec, Canada
- Height: 1.68 m (5 ft 6 in)
- Position: Defender

Team information
- Current team: Florida State Seminoles

College career
Years	Team	Apps	(Gls)
2024	NC State Wolfpack	10	(0)
2025–	Florida State Seminoles	23	(0)

Senior career*
Years	Team	Apps	(Gls)
2024	CF Montreal Academy	3	(0)
2025–	FC Laval	8	(0)

International career^{‡}
2021–2022	Canada U-17	10	(0)
2024–	Canada U-20	4	(0)
- * Club domestic league appearances and goals as of August 15, 2025 ‡ National team caps and goals as of September 11, 2024

Janet Chidinma Kalu Okeke (born March 1, 2006) is a Canadian college soccer player who plays as a defender for the Florida State Seminoles. She won the 2025 national championship with the Seminoles. She previously played for the NC State Wolfpack. She is a youth international for Canada.

== Early life ==
Okeke was born in Montreal and raised in the suburb of Laval. Her parents, Augustina and Kalu, moved to Canada from Nigeria. She started playing soccer with CS Fabrose at age five. She later played for Soccer Quebec's EXCEL team. She won silver representing Quebec at the 2022 Canada Summer Games, where she was named to the all-star team. She attended École Secondaire Georges-Vanier in Laval.

== College career ==
After making 10 starts for the NC State Wolfpack in her freshman season in 2024, Okeke transferred to the Florida State Seminoles.

== International career ==
Okeke joined Canada's national youth set-up at age 15 in 2021. She helped Canada win bronze at the 2022 CONCACAF Women's U-20 Championship and played at the 2022 FIFA U-17 Women's World Cup and the 2024 FIFA U-20 Women's World Cup.

Okeke received her first senior national team call-up on November 21, 2024, ahead of international friendlies against Iceland and South Korea.

== Honours ==
Florida State Seminoles

- NCAA Division I women's soccer tournament: 2025

Canada U-20

- CONCACAF Women's U-20 Championship: 2025
