= Jeneva Hernandez Gray =

Canadian soccer player (born 2006)

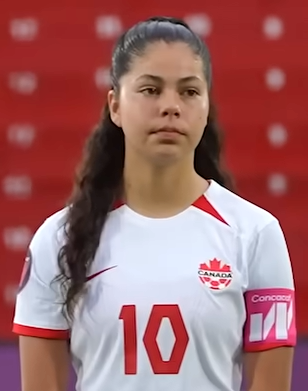
- Hernandez Gray with Canada at the 2025 CONCACAF Women's U-20 Championship

Personal information
- Full name: Jeneva Ann Hernandez Gray
- Date of birth: October 5, 2006 (age 20)
- Place of birth: Coquitlam, British Columbia, Canada
- Height: 1.63 m (5 ft 4 in)
- Position: Midfielder

Team information
- Current team: Sporting CP

Youth career
- Port Coquitlam Euro-Rite FC
- TSS FC Rovers
- Mountain United FC
- 2019–: Vancouver Whitecaps Girls Elite

Senior career*
| Years | Team | Apps | (Gls) |
| 2022–2024 | Vancouver Whitecaps Girls Elite | 30 | (12) |
| 2025– | Sporting CP | 4 | (1) |

International career^{‡}
| 2021–2022 | Canada U17 | 11 | (0) |
| 2023– | Canada U20 | 18 | (6) |
| 2024– | Canada | 1 | (0) |
- * Club domestic league appearances and goals as of May 11, 2025 ‡ National team caps and goals as of June 2, 2025

Jeneva Ann Hernandez Gray (born October 5, 2006) is a Canadian professional soccer player who plays for Portuguese Campeonato Nacional Feminino club Sporting CP and the Canada national team.

== Early life ==
Hernandez Gray began playing soccer at age five with Port Coquitlam Euro-Rite FC. She then spent some time with TSS FC Rovers. She later played with Mountain United FC, before joining the Vancouver Whitecaps Girls Elite program in August 2019. In 2023, she was named the Whitecaps Most Promising Female Player and the Academy Female Player of the year. She played with Team British Columbia at the 2022 Canada Summer Games, and was named to the tournament Best XI.

In 2023, she committed to attend Auburn University in the fall of 2024 to play for the women's soccer team, but later deferred her enrollment to January 2025, due to her national team commitments. She ultimately did not attend Auburn, instead signing a professional contract in January 2025.

== Club career ==
In 2022, she began playing with the Vancouver Whitecaps Girls Elite in League1 British Columbia. In 2022, she scored the winning goal in the League1 BC Championship final, and assisted the winner in 2023 final. In 2023, she helped the team win five trophies. On July 15, 2023, she scored a brace in a 5–4 victory over Unity FC which sealed the League1 BC regular-season title. Hernandez Gray led the Whitecaps to regular-season and playoff titles in the 2024 League1 British Columbia season and defended Inter-Provincial Championship. She was named the league's Top Midfielder, Young Player of the Year, and Player of the Year. She also started all four of the Whitecaps' matches in the inaugural edition of the 2024–25 CONCACAF W Champions Cup.

In January 2025, she signed with Portuguese club Sporting CP in the Campeonato Nacional Feminino until 2028. She made her debut on February 12, 2025 in the Taça da Liga Feminina semi-final against Damaiense recording an assist. On May 11, 2025, she scored her first goal for the club in a 3-0 victory over Marítimo.

== International career ==
Born in Canada, Hernandez Gray is of Mexican descent through her father. In December 2021, she made her debut in the Canadian national program attending a camp with the Canada U17 team. She won a bronze medal at the 2022 CONCACAF Women's U-17 Championship and subsequently played for the team at the 2022 FIFA U-17 Women's World Cup. She also played with the Canada U20 team at the 2023 CONCACAF Women's U-20 Championship and the 2024 FIFA U-20 Women's World Cup.

In November 2023, she was called up to the Canada senior team for the first time, ahead of a pair of friendlies in December against Australia. On December 3, 2024, she earned her first cap at senior level, in a friendly against South Korea.

== Career statistics ==
As of May 11, 2025

| Club | Season | League | | | Playoffs | | Domestic Cup | | League Cup | | Continental | | Other | | Total | |
| Club | Season | Division | Apps | Goals | Apps | Goals | Apps | Goals | Apps | Goals | Apps | Goals | Apps | Goals | Apps | Goals |
|---|---|---|---|---|---|---|---|---|---|---|---|---|---|---|---|---|
| Whitecaps FC Girls Elite | 2022 | League1 British Columbia | 11 | 1 | 1 | 1 | — | | — | | — | | — | | 12 | 2 |
| Whitecaps FC Girls Elite | 2023 | League1 British Columbia | 9 | 3 | 2 | 0 | — | | — | | — | | 2 (Note: Appearance(s) in Women's Inter-Provincial Championship) | 1 | 13 | 4 |
| Whitecaps FC Girls Elite | 2024 | League1 British Columbia | 10 | 8 | 2 | 1 | — | | — | | 4 | 0 | 2 | 0 | 16 | 9 |
| Whitecaps FC Girls Elite | Total | | 30 | 12 | 5 | 2 | — | | — | | 4 | 0 | 4 | 1 | 43 | 15 |
| Sporting CP | 2024–25 | Campeonato Nacional Feminino | 4 | 1 | — | | 2 | 0 | 1 | 0 | 2 | 0 | 0 | 0 | 9 | 1 |
| Career total | | | 34 | 13 | 5 | 2 | 2 | 0 | 1 | 0 | 6 | 0 | 4 | 1 | 52 | 16 |

== Honours ==
Canada

- CONCACAF Women's U-20 Championship: 2025
