= Liliana Godoy =

Mexican footballer and manager (born 1990)

Personal information
- Full name: Liliana Guadalupe Godoy García
- Date of birth: 21 June 1990 (age 36)
- Place of birth: Mexico City, Mexico
- Height: 1.64 m (5 ft 5 in)
- Position: Forward

Team information
- Current team: UANL U19 (women) (assistant)

Senior career*
Years	Team	Apps	(Gls)
2018	Cruz Azul (women)	4	(1)

International career
2008	Mexico U20		

Managerial career
- 2021–2022: Mazatlán U17 (women)
- 2022–2023: Pachuca U18 (women)
- 2023–2024: Pachuca (women) (assistant)
- 2025: UNAM U19 (women) (assistant)
- 2026–: UANL U19 (women) (assistant)
- * Club domestic league appearances and goals

Liliana Guadalupe Godoy García (born 21 June 1990) is a Mexican football manager and former player.

== Club career ==
A forward, Godoy started her career in 2018 with Cruz Azul (women).

== International career ==
Godoy represented Mexico U-20 in the 2008 U20 World Cup in Chile.

== Managerial career ==
After retirement, Godoy started her managerial career in 2021 with Mazatlán U-17 (women). In 2023 she joined the managerial staff of Pachuca (women).
