= American University (Nicaragua) =

Private university in Managua, Nicaragua

Coordinates: 12°06′31.1″N 86°15′25.2″W

- Universidad Americana (UAM)
- Motto: UAM Going Global
- Type: Private university
- Established: 1992
- Rector: Martín Guevara
- Location: Managua, Nicaragua
- Language: Spanish
- Mascot: Jaguar
- Website: www.uam.edu.ni

The American University (Spanish: Universidad Americana (UAM)) is a private university located in Managua, Nicaragua. It was founded in 1992 and offers undergraduate and graduate degrees in a variety of professional fields including law, medicine, business, and engineering. While most degree programs include English language requirements, Spanish is the language of instruction for all courses except those offered by UAM College. The university website cites that more than 5,000 students have graduated from UAM since its founding.

== History ==
The American University (UAM) was founded in 1992, by a group of university professors with vast experience in the teaching research and administrative field, with the purpose of devoting to the development of higher education in Nicaragua. On November 26, 1992, The National Council of Universities (CNU) approved UAM officially, and conferred its national recognition.

== Departments ==
As of May 2020, the following departments offered degree programs at American University:

- Department of Medicine
- Department of Dentistry
- Department of Juridical Sciences and International Relations
- Department of Marketing, Design, and Communication Sciences
- Department of Administrative and Economic Sciences
- Department of Engineering and Architecture
- UAM College

== UAM College ==
Founded in 1998, UAM College is categorized as a distinct department within American University. While it offers many of the same undergraduate degree programs offered by other departments, it is often distinguished because all courses are taught in English. In addition, many UAM College professors hold doctoral degrees in their fields. Taken together, these attributes are meant to ensure that a UAM College degree is equal in quality with degrees earned in the United States. Due to the design of its programs, UAM College has welcomed many international exchange students in previous years. It has also become a popular option for students that hope to transfer to universities abroad after completing core courses. However, many students choose to start and finish their degrees at UAM College; since its founding, more than 300 students have graduated from the department

UAM College currently offers five major degree programs:

- Natural Resource Management
- Global Finance
- Strategic Marketing
- Global Management
- International Development

Besides these major degree programs, students can choose from a list of minors including: Business Law, Economics, Entrepreneurship, Environmental Issues, Finance, International Development, Management, and Strategic Marketing. Students may further narrow their focus within their minor program of study by choosing a concentration, those of which include: Tourism Development, Outsourcing Management, Natural Resource Management, Integrated Marketing, Environmental Issues, Education, and Branding and Communications.

UAM College was founded as the "Business Administration Faculty" and was known by this name until 2010, when its title changed to the "College of University Studies in English." Its current name, UAM College, was adopted in 2017.

== Language Center ==
The mission of the Language Center is to "contribute to the training of professionals with language competency in English, with a multicultural vision that will allow them to interact and effectively develop in different spheres of their daily and professional lives."

The Language Center currently offers two English-language programs. The first, English for Global Success (EGS), is geared towards helping learners age 16+ develop sufficient language proficiency to score a B2 on the Common European Framework of Reference for Languages (CEFR). The program is composed of fourteen levels, each of which correspond to two months of Saturday instruction. The second program, English for Global Leaders, is oriented towards business executives and other professionals and prepares participants to score a B2 on the CEFR. The program consists of fifteen levels, each of which corresponds to one month of Monday-Thursday instruction. Besides these two programs, the Language Center also offers corporate classes catered to the needs of private businesses.
