= Montserrat Saldívar =

Mexican footballer (born 2006)

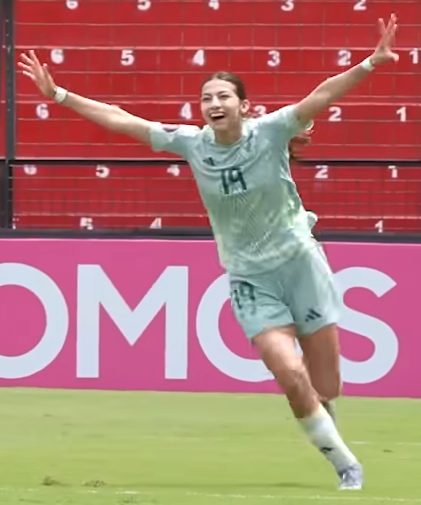
- Saldívar with Mexico at the 2025 CONCACAF Women's U-20 Championship

Personal information
- Full name: Angelique Montserrat Saldivar Pavón
- Date of birth: 20 September 2006 (age 20)
- Place of birth: Benito Juárez, Quintana Roo, Mexico
- Height: 1.69 m (5 ft 7 in)
- Position: Winger

Team information
- Current team: América
- Number: 19

Youth career
- 2021: América

Senior career*
Years	Team	Apps	(Gls)
2021–	América	135	(40)

International career^{‡}
2022	Mexico U17	10	(2)
2023–2026	Mexico U20	16	(12)
2024–	Mexico	14	(3)
- * Club domestic league appearances and goals as of 14 September 2026 ‡ National team caps and goals as of 14 September 2026

Angelique Montserrat Saldivar Pavón (born 20 September 2006) is a Mexican professional footballer who plays as a winger for Liga MX Femenil side Club América and the Mexico national team.

== Early life ==
Montse Saldivar was born on 20 September 2006 in the Benito Juárez Municipality of the state of Quintana Roo. As a child, she tried multiple sports before choosing football.

Saldívar initially played football with boys in Cancún before being noticed by former Mexico national team player Iris Mora, who offered Saldívar the opportunity to join her newly created football academy with the goal of developing her skills, and giving her a path into professional football, which she accepted.

In 2018, Mora invited her former national team coach and then Club América manager, Leonardo Cuéllar, to observe and scout players from her academy. Saldívar impressed Cuéllar enough that he requested Club América to sign her so that she could be integrated as part of their soon-to-be-created U-15 and U-17 teams, which were planning to participate in the upcoming youth division of Liga MX Femenil. However, due to a major delay in the creation of this youth division, the club declined to sign her.

== Club career ==
In 2020, Saldívar received an invitation from Club América’s manager, Leonardo Cuéllar, to a training tryout with América's senior team after successfully completing a previous tryout at a scouting event in Mexico City. Just as their previous meeting two years earlier, Saldivar impressed Cuellar enough during the tryout that he once again requested América to sign her. Saldivar also had an offer to join America's main rival, Chivas, which was also the club that her family supported, but she declined it.

=== Club América (2021–present) ===
Saldívar officially joined América in 2021 and was initially integrated with the U-17 side. She was promoted to the senior team ahead of the Liga MX Femenil's Apertura 2021 tournament on 16 July 2021. She made her professional debut with América at age 14 on 16 August 2021, in an away match against Pachuca in which she was part of the starting line-up. By debuting at 14, she became the youngest Club América Femenil player to have debuted professionally, a record that can't be broken as Liga MX Femenil no longer allow players under 15 to play professionally. While Saldivar did had a successful debut tournament, becoming even a regular in the team starting lineups, she subsequently received less play time under head coach Ángel Villacampa, who relegated her to be mostly a sub.

After having a successful display with Mexico during the 2024 FIFA U-20 Women's World Cup, Saldivar began to received more playing time with América, this time as a winger rather than as a left-back, which was the only position that she had played on for América since her debut. Subsequently, Saldivar's breakthrough season with América came during the Clausura 2025 tournament, in which she became a key player for the team by scoring 12 goals and being one of the players with the most minutes played, and helping the team reach the final of the tournament

== International career ==
=== Youth ===
Saldivar has been part of the Mexico women's national football team program since the U-17 level. She was part of the Mexico U-17 team that participated on the 2022 CONCACAF Women's U-17 Championship and 2022 FIFA U-17 Women's World Cup.

Since 2023, Saldivar has been part of the Mexico U-20 team. She was part of the Mexico team that participate at the 2024 FIFA U-20 Women's World Cup, in which she started all four games that Mexico played during this tournament, and scored one goal and gave three assists. Saldivar was called again to play for U-20 team during the 2025 CONCACAF Women's U-20 Championship, helping Mexico reach the final of the competition by becoming the top scorer of the tournament. Due to her performance throughout the competition, CONCACAF awarded Saldivar the top-goal scorer and best-player awards.

=== Senior ===
Saldivar was called to the senior national team for the first time on 18 October 2024, for friendlies against Venezuela and Thailand. She made her debut with the senior team on 26 October 2024, in the match against Venezuela. She scored her first goal with the senior team during the 2025 Pinatar Cup, in a match against Chinese Taipei on 19 February 2025.

== Career statistics ==
=== Club ===
As of As of match played 9 January 2026

Appearances and goals by club, season and competition
Club	Season	League			National cup (Note: Includes Campeón de Campeones)		League cup (Note: Includes Summer Cup)		Continental		Total	
Club	Season	Division	Apps	Goals	Apps	Goals	Apps	Goals	Apps	Goals	Apps	Goals
Club América	2021–22	Liga MX Femenil	22	1	—		—		—		22	1
Club América	2022–23	Liga MX Femenil	10	1	—		—		—		10	1
Club América	2023–24	Liga MX Femenil	24	1	2	0	—		—		26	1
Club América	2024–25	Liga MX Femenil	35	17	—		1	0	2	0	38	17
Club América	2025–26	Liga MX Femenil	24	14	—		—		4	1	11	15
Career total			115	34	2	0	1	0	6	1	124	35

=== International ===
No.	Date	Venue	Opponent	Score	Result	Competition
1.	19 February 2025	Pinatar Arena, San Pedro del Pinatar, Spain	Chinese Taipei	3–0	4–0	2025 Pinatar Cup
2.	19 February 2025	Pinatar Arena, San Pedro del Pinatar, Spain	Chinese Taipei	4–0	4–0	2025 Pinatar Cup
3.	29 November 2025	Arnos Vale Stadium, Arnos Vale, Saint Vincent and the Grenadines	Saint Vincent and the Grenadines	10–0	14–0	2026 CONCACAF W Championship qualification

== Honours ==
Club América

- Liga MX Femenil: Clausura 2023, Clausura 2026
- CONCACAF W Champions Cup: 2025–26

Mexico U-20

- CONCACAF Women's U-20 Championship: 2023

Individual

- CONCACAF Women's U-20 Championship Golden Ball: 2025
- CONCACAF Women's U-20 Championship Golden Boot: 2025
- CONCACAF W Champions Cup Best young player: 2025–26
