= Jennifer Leiva =

Nicaraguan football player and manager

Personal information
- Full name: Jennifer Cristiana Leiva Medrano
- Date of birth: 10 November 1991 (age 35)
- Position: Midfielder

International career^{‡}
Years	Team	Apps	(Gls)
2009	Nicaragua U20	2	(0)
2010	Nicaragua	6	(0)

Managerial career
- 2013: Nicaragua Women (assistant coach)
- ‡ National team caps and goals as of 1 August 2010.

Jennifer Cristiana Leiva Medrano (born 10 November 1991) is a Nicaraguan football manager and former player who played as a midfielder. She has been a member of the Nicaragua women's national team.

== International career ==
Leiva capped for Nicaragua at senior level during the 2010 CONCACAF Women's World Cup Qualifying qualification and the 2010 Central American and Caribbean Games.

== Managerial career ==
In 2012, Leiva was found to have a brain tumor. She consequently retired from her playing career and by 2013 she was the assistant coach of the Nicaragua women's national team.
