= Canada women's national under-20 soccer team =

Canada U-20s
- Nickname(s): The Canucks, Les Rouges (The Reds)
- Association: Canadian Soccer Association
- Confederation: CONCACAF (North America)
- Head coach: Cindy Tye
- FIFA code: CAN
First colours	Second colours

FIFA U-20 World Cup
- Appearances: 10 (first in 2002)
- Best result: Runners-up (2002)

CONCACAF U-20 Championship
- Appearances: 11 (first in 2004)
- Best result: Winners (2004, 2008, 2025)
Medal record
CONCACAF Under-20 Championship
Gold medal – first place	2004 Canada
Gold medal – first place	2008 Mexico
Gold medal – first place	2025 Costa Rica
Silver medal – second place	2006 Mexico
Silver medal – second place	2012 Panama
Silver medal – second place	2015 Honduras
Bronze medal – third place	2022 Dominican Republic
Bronze medal – third place	2023 Dominican Republic

The Canada U-20 women's national soccer team (also known as Canada Under-20s or Canada U-20s) represents Canada in international soccer at this age level. They are overseen by the Canadian Soccer Association, the governing body for soccer in Canada.

Its primary role is the development of players in preparation for the full women's national team. They have qualified for the FIFA U-20 Women's World Cup ten out of twelve, finishing runners-up in 2002. They have also competed at the CONCACAF Women's U-20 Championship eleven of thirteen times, winning in back-to-back championship in 2004 and 2008 and the 2025 edition.

== History ==
Canada hosted the inaugural FIFA U-20 Women's World Cup in 2002 (U-19 prior to 2006). They won silver led by future star Christine Sinclair, finishing runner-up to the United States in a close 0–1 extra time defeat. Two years later, Canada won the 2004 CONCACAF Women's U-20 Championship, again on home soil in another final contested against the Americans. They would repeat the feat four years later in Mexico, defeating the United States to capture their second CONCACAF Women's U-20 title.

At the 2010 CONCACAF Women's U-20 Championship, Canada lost a critical third place match to Costa Rica, eliminating them from World Cup qualification for the first time.

== Results & fixtures ==
The following is a list of match results in the last twelve months, as well as any future matches that have been scheduled.

Legend

Win Draw Loss Fixture

=== 2026 ===
5 September 2026 FIFA U-20 Women's World Cup - Group B	Canada	1–1	England	Stadion Miejski Bielsko-Biała, Bielsko-Biała
	Chukwu 52'	Report	Maltby 89' (pen.)	Referee: Anahí Fernández (Uruguay)

8 September 2026 FIFA U-20 Women's World Cup - Group B	Brazil	3-0	Canada	Stadion Miejski Bielsko-Biała, Bielsko-Biała
	Nogueira 7' (pen.); Vitorinha 49'; Brendha 52'	Report		Referee: Maria Sole Ferrieri Caputi (Italy)

11 September 2026 FIFA U-20 Women's World Cup - Group B	Tanzania	0-6	Canada	Stadion Miejski Bielsko-Biała, Bielsko-Biała
		Report	Maseke 7' (o.g.); Chisholm 49'; Chukwu 54', 66'; Hunter 76'; Tarasco 85'	Referee: Kim Yu-jeong (South Korea)

17 September 2026 FIFA U-20 Women's World Cup - Round of 16	France	1-3	Canada	Stadion Miejski ŁKS Łódź, Łódź
	Roche-Dufour 81'	Report	Hunter 28', 33', 70'	Referee: Antsino Twanyanyukwa (Namibia)

20 September 2026 FIFA U-20 Women's World Cup - Quarter-finals	North Korea	2–0	Canada	Stadion Miejski ŁKS Łódź, Łódź
	Choe Rim-jong 90+2'; Ho Kyong 90+6'	Report		Referee: Maria Sole Ferrieri Caputi (Italy)

== Players ==
=== Current squad ===
The following 21 players were called up to the 2026 FIFA U-20 Women's World Cup.
Caps and goals updated as of 11 September 2026, after the match against Tanzania U-20.

No.	Pos.	Player	Date of birth (age)	Caps	Goals	Club
1	GK	Noelle Henning	4 February 2007 (age 19)	6	0	(United States Soccer Federation) Michigan State Spartans
18	GK	Khadijah Cissé	18 May 2008 (age 18)	0	0	(Royal Spanish Football Federation) Barcelona
21	GK	Madison London	22 August 2007 (age 19)	0	0	(United States Soccer Federation) New Mexico Lobos
6	MF	Olivia Chisholm	5 December 2008 (age 17)	5	0	(Canadian Soccer Association) AFC Toronto
9	FW	Annabelle Chukwu	8 February 2007 (age 19)	9	9	(United States Soccer Federation) Notre Dame Fighting Irish

=== Previous squads ===
FIFA U-20 World Cup

- 2002 FIFA U-19 Women's World Championship
- 2004 FIFA U-19 Women's World Championship
- 2006 FIFA U-20 Women's World Championship
- 2008 FIFA U-20 Women's World Cup
- 2012 FIFA U-20 Women's World Cup
- 2014 FIFA U-20 Women's World Cup
- 2016 FIFA U-20 Women's World Cup
- 2022 FIFA U-20 Women's World Cup
- 2024 FIFA U-20 Women's World Cup

CONCACAF U-20 Championship

- 2008 CONCACAF Women's U-20 Championship
- 2012 CONCACAF Women's U-20 Championship
- 2018 CONCACAF Women's U-20 Championship
- 2020 CONCACAF Women's U-20 Championship
- 2022 CONCACAF Women's U-20 Championship
- 2023 CONCACAF Women's U-20 Championship
- 2025 CONCACAF Women's U-20 Championship

== Competitive record ==
Champions Runners-up Third place Fourth place Tournament played fully or partially on home soil

=== FIFA U-20 Women's World Cup ===
Year	Round	Pld	W	D*	L	GF	GA	Squad
(Canada) 2002	Runners-up	6	4	1	1	16	6	Squad
(Thailand) 2004	Quarter-finals	4	2	1	1	13	7	Squad
(Russia) 2006	Group stage	3	1	0	2	4	4	Squad
(Chile) 2008	Group stage	3	1	0	2	5	4	Squad
(Germany) 2010	Did not qualify							
(Japan) 2012	Group stage	3	1	0	2	8	4	Squad
(Canada) 2014	Quarter-finals	4	2	0	2	4	5	Squad
(Papua New Guinea) 2016	Group stage	3	0	0	3	1	13	Squad
(France) 2018	Did not qualify							
(Costa Rica) 2022	Group stage	3	0	0	3	2	8	Squad
(Colombia) 2024	Round of 16	4	1	1	2	13	7	Squad
(Poland) 2026	Quarter-finals	5	2	1	2	10	7	Squad
Total	10/12	38	14	4	20	76	65	—N/a

* Denotes draws include knockout matches decided on penalty kicks.

=== CONCACAF Women's U-20 Championship ===
CONCACAF U-20 Championship record
Year	Result	Pld	W	D	L	GF	GA
(Trinidad and Tobago) 2002	Did not enter						
(Canada) 2004	Champions	5	5	0	0	20	1
(Mexico) 2006	Runners-up	5	4	0	1	20	7
(Mexico) 2008	Champions	5	5	0	0	12	2
(Guatemala) 2010	Fourth place	5	3	0	2	6	3
(Panama) 2012	Runners-up	5	4	0	1	15	2
(Cayman Islands) 2014	Did not enter						
(Honduras) 2015	Runners-up	5	4	0	1	11	1
(Trinidad and Tobago) 2018	Fourth place	5	3	1	1	12	4
(Dominican Republic) 2020	Quarter-finals	5	2	1	2	9	7
(Dominican Republic) 2022	Third place	7	6	0	1	32	1
(Dominican Republic) 2023	Third place	5	3	0	2	17	10
(Costa Rica) 2025	Champions	5	4	0	1	17	8
Total	11/13	57	42	3	12	171	46

== Head-to-head record ==
The following table shows Canada's head-to-head record in the FIFA U-20 Women's World Cup.

Opponent	Pld	W	D	L	GF	GA	GD	Win %
Argentina	1	1	0	0	6	0	+6	100.00
Australia	1	1	0	0	2	1	+1	100.00
Brazil	3	0	1	2	1	6	−5	0.00
China	2	0	0	2	1	4	−3	0.00
Denmark	1	1	0	0	3	2	+1	100.00
DR Congo	1	1	0	0	4	0	+4	100.00
England	2	1	1	0	7	3	+4	50.00
Fiji	1	1	0	0	9	0	+9	100.00
Finland	2	2	0	0	5	2	+3	100.00
France	4	2	1	1	10	8	+2	50.00
Germany	3	0	1	2	4	7	−3	0.00
Ghana	1	0	0	1	0	1	−1	0.00
Japan	3	1	0	2	4	7	−3	33.33
Nigeria	4	1	0	3	6	9	−3	25.00
North Korea	3	1	0	2	2	4	−2	33.33
Norway	1	0	0	1	1	2	−1	0.00
South Korea	1	0	0	1	0	2	−2	0.00
Spain	2	0	0	2	1	7	−6	0.00
Tanzania	1	1	0	0	6	0	+6	100.00
Thailand	1	1	0	0	7	0	+7	100.00
United States	1	0	0	1	0	1	−1	0.00
Total	38	14	4	20	76	65	+11	36.84

== See also ==
- Canada women's national soccer team
- Canada women's national under-17 soccer team
- Canada girls' national under-15 soccer team
- Canada women's national futsal team
- Soccer in Canada
