= Julia Valadez =

Mexican footballer (born 2006)

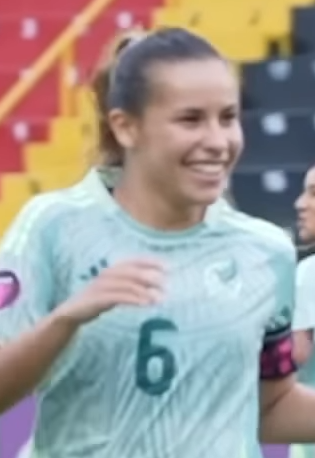
- Valadez with Mexico at the 2025 CONCACAF Women's U-20 Championship

Personal information
- Full name: Julia Yareli Valadez Alvidrez
- Date of birth: 6 April 2006 (age 20)
- Place of birth: Chihuahua City, Chihuahua, Mexico
- Height: 1.57 m (5 ft 2 in)
- Position: Defensive midfielder

Team information
- Current team: Pachuca
- Number: 28

Youth career
- 2023: Pachuca

Senior career*
Years	Team	Apps	(Gls)
2023–	Pachuca	14	(1)

International career^{‡}
2023–	Mexico U-20		
- * Club domestic league appearances and goals as of 4 June 2023 ‡ National team caps and goals as of 12 March 2022

Julia Yareli Valadez Alvidrez (born 6 April 2006) is a Mexican professional footballer who plays as a defensive midfielder for Liga MX Femenil club Pachuca.

== Career ==
In 2023, she started her career in Pachuca.

== International career ==
Since 2023, Valadez has been part of the Mexico U-20 team.
