= Emma Johnson (soccer) =

American soccer player (born 2007)

Personal information
- Full name: Emma Louise Johnson
- Date of birth: July 20, 2007 (age 19)
- Position: Midfielder

Team information
- Current team: Penn State Nittany Lions
- Number: 10

Youth career
- FC Pride
- 2019–2024: Indy Eleven
- 2025–2026: Indy Premier SC

College career
Years	Team	Apps	(Gls)
2026–	Penn State Nittany Lions		

Senior career*
Years	Team	Apps	(Gls)
2022–2024	Indy Eleven	8	(1)
2024–2025	Lexington SC	14	(0)
2026–	Indy Eleven	5	(2)

International career^{‡}
2025–	United States U-20	13	(1)
- * Club domestic league appearances and goals as of June 25, 2026 ‡ National team caps and goals as of September 16, 2026

Emma Louise Johnson (born July 20, 2007) is an American college soccer player who plays as a midfielder for the Penn State Nittany Lions. She previously played for USL Super League club Lexington SC.

== Early life ==
Johnson grew up in Greenfield, Indiana, and began playing soccer at age four. After starting out with local club FC Pride, she joined the Indy Eleven Academy (previously Indiana Fire) at the U12 age group, earning ECNL all-conference honors multiple times. In 2022, she became the youngest player to score a goal for Indy Eleven in the USL W League at age 14. In 2023, she helped the club win the USL W League championship, defeating the North Carolina Courage U23 in the final. She was educated in the Mount Vernon High School system until she switched to online school after her freshman year.

After committing to play college soccer for the Penn State Nittany Lions, she joined USL Super League club Lexington SC as an academy player (allowing her to retain college eligibility). She made her debut for the club in a 1–0 loss to Brooklyn FC on September 28, 2024, and finished the league's inaugural season with 14 appearances, including 5 starts. She was ranked by TopDrawerSoccer as the 35th-best prospect in the class of 2026, part of Penn State's third-ranked class.

== International career ==
Johnson debuted for the United States under-20 team at the 2025 CONCACAF Women's U-20 Championship. She was part of the under-20 roster at the 2026 FIFA U-20 Women's World Cup in Poland, starting at left back in three of their four matches. They lost on penalties to Brazil in the round of 16.

== Honors and awards ==
Indy Eleven

- USL W League: 2023
