= 2025 CONCACAF Women's U-20 Championship =

International football tournament

Tournament details
- Host country: Costa Rica
- City: Alajuela
- Dates: 29 May – 8 June
- Teams: 8 (from 1 confederation)
- Venue(s): 1 (in 1 host city)

Final positions
- Champions: Canada (3rd title)
- Runners-up: Mexico

Tournament statistics
- Matches played: 15
- Goals scored: 76 (5.07 per match)
- Top scorer(s): (Mexico) Montserrat Saldívar (8 goals)
- Best player(s): (Mexico) Montserrat Saldívar
- Best goalkeeper: (Canada) Noelle Henning
- Fair play award: Canada

The 2025 CONCACAF Women's U-20 Championship was the 13th edition of the CONCACAF Women's U-20 Championship, an international youth football championship organised by CONCACAF for the women's under-20 national teams of the North, Central American and Caribbean region. It took place from 29 May to 8 June 2025.

Canada defeated the defending champions Mexico in the final.

The four semi-finalist teams from the tournament qualified for the 2026 FIFA U-20 Women's World Cup in Poland as the CONCACAF representatives.

== Qualification ==
=== Qualified teams ===
Twenty-four teams competed for six spots in the final tournament, where they will joined the two highest-seeded teams on the CONCACAF Women's Under-20 Ranking as of 23 September 2024, the United States and Mexico.

Team	Method of qualification	Date of qualification	Finals appearance	Previous best performance	Previous World Cup appearances
United States	Two top-ranked entrants	31 October 2024	13th	Champions (2006, 2010, 2012, 2014, 2015, 2020, 2022)	11
Mexico (title holders)	Two top-ranked entrants	31 October 2024	13th	Champions (2018, 2023)	10
Guyana	Qualification Group A winners	25 February 2025	3rd	Quarter-finals (2020)	0
Puerto Rico	Qualification Group B winners	24 February 2025	4th	Fourth place (2022)	0
Panama	Qualification Group C winners	25 February 2025	8th	Fourth place (2012)	0
Nicaragua	Qualification Group D winners	24 February 2025	5th	Group stage (2008, 2018, 2020, 2022)	0
Canada	Qualification Group E winners	25 February 2025	5th	Champions (2004, 2008)	9
Costa Rica	Qualification Group F winners	24 February 2025	8th	Third place (2004, 2010, 2014)	4

== Venue ==
On 6 March 2025, CONCACAF announced that Costa Rica would host the tournament.

2025 CONCACAF Women's U-20 Championship is located in Costa Rica	Alajuela
2025 CONCACAF Women's U-20 Championship is located in Costa Rica	Estadio Alejandro Morera Soto
2025 CONCACAF Women's U-20 Championship is located in Costa Rica	Capacity: 17,895

== Draw ==
The draw of the tournament was held on 26 March 2025 at the CONCACAF Headquarters in Miami, Florida. The 8 teams were drawn into two groups of four teams, with the pots based on the CONCACAF Women's Under-20 Ranking at 6 March 2025.

Pot 1	Pot 2	Pot 3	Pot 4
United States (1); Mexico (2)	Canada (3); Costa Rica (4)	Puerto Rico (5); Panama (10)	Guyana (11); Nicaragua (13)

Group A
Pos	Team
A1	United States
A2	Costa Rica
A3	Puerto Rico
A4	Guyana

Group B
Pos	Team
B1	Mexico
B2	Canada
B3	Panama
B4	Nicaragua

== Squads ==
Players born on or between 1 January 2006 and 31 December 2010 were eligible to compete. Each team registered a squad of 21 players, three of whom must be goalkeepers.

== Format ==
The tournament had two groups of four teams. After round-robin play, the top two teams of each group advanced to the semi-finals. The four semi-finalists also qualified for the 2026 FIFA U-20 Women's World Cup.

In the knockout stage, if a match was tied at the end of 90 minutes, extra time was played, and if still tied after extra time, the match would be decided by a penalty shoot-out (Regulations Article 12.10).

=== Tiebreakers ===
The ranking of teams in each group was determined as follows (Regulations Article 12.7):

1. Points obtained in all group matches;
2. Goal difference in all group matches;
3. Goals scored in all group matches;
4. Points obtained in the matches played between the teams in question;
5. Goal difference in the matches played between the teams in question;
6. Goals scored in the matches played between the teams in question;
7. Fair play points in all group matches:
  - Yellow card: −1 point
  - Indirect red card (second yellow card): −3 points
  - Direct red card: −4 points
  - Yellow card and direct red card: −5 points
8. Drawing of lots.

== Group stage ==
All times are local, CST (UTC−6).

=== Group A ===
Pos	Team	Pld	W	D	L	GF	GA	GD	Pts	Qualification
1	United States	3	3	0	0	15	1	+14	9	2026 FIFA U-20 Women's World Cup and Knockout stage
2	Costa Rica (H)	3	1	1	1	9	4	+5	4	2026 FIFA U-20 Women's World Cup and Knockout stage
3	Puerto Rico	3	1	1	1	8	3	+5	4	
4	Guyana	3	0	0	3	0	24	−24	0	

Source: CONCACAF
Rules for classification: Tiebreakers
(H) Hosts
30 May 2025
11:00

United States	8–0	Guyana
Engle 5', 24', 41', 48'; Fuller 13' (pen.); Strawn 25'; Ullmark 37'; Johnson 77'	Report

Estadio Alejandro Morera Soto, Alajuela
Referee: Lizzet García (Mexico)
30 May 2025
14:00

Costa Rica	0–0	Puerto Rico
	Report

Estadio Alejandro Morera Soto, Alajuela
Referee: Vimarest Díaz (Dominican Republic)

1 June 2025
11:00

Puerto Rico	1–3	United States
Gaines 67'	Report	Scott 4'; Long 24', 65'

Estadio Alejandro Morera Soto, Alajuela
Referee: Dilia Bradley (Guatemala)
1 June 2025
14:00

Guyana	0–9	Costa Rica
	Report	Scott 5' (pen.), 22' (pen.), 25', 45+6', 90+5'; Azofeifa 29', 90+3'; Paniagua 63'; Ocampo 84'

Estadio Alejandro Morera Soto, Alajuela
Referee: Merlin Soto (Honduras)

3 June 2025
11:00

Puerto Rico	7–0	Guyana
McMahon 5', 85'; González 9'; Roberts 34', 90+3'; Garnett 59', 68'	Report

Estadio Alejandro Morera Soto, Alajuela
Referee: Merlin Soto (Honduras)
3 June 2025
14:00

United States	4–0	Costa Rica
Ullmark 22'; Long 60'; Restovich 65'; Fuller 87'	Report

Estadio Alejandro Morera Soto, Alajuela
Referee: Lizzet García (Mexico)

=== Group B ===
Pos	Team	Pld	W	D	L	GF	GA	GD	Pts	Qualification
1	Mexico	3	3	0	0	14	2	+12	9	2026 FIFA U-20 Women's World Cup and Knockout stage
2	Canada	3	2	0	1	13	6	+7	6	2026 FIFA U-20 Women's World Cup and Knockout stage
3	Panama	3	1	0	2	5	12	−7	3	
4	Nicaragua	3	0	0	3	2	14	−12	0	

Source: CONCACAF
Rules for classification: Tiebreakers
29 May 2025
11:00

Canada	7–1	Panama
Collin 12'; Hernandez Gray 18'; Chukwu 21', 45+1'; Larouche 45+9'; Schoeley 85'; Tarasco 90+3'	Report	King 24'

Estadio Alejandro Morera Soto, Alajuela
Referee: Deily Gómez (Costa Rica)
29 May 2025
14:00

Mexico	6–0	Nicaragua
Fragoso 2', 61'; Saldívar 9', 26'; Valadez 40'; Ali. Soto 64'	Report

Estadio Alejandro Morera Soto, Alajuela
Referee: Alyssa Nichols (United States)

31 May 2025
11:00

Nicaragua	1–4	Canada
Sarantes 37' (pen.)	Report	Ad. Munguia 23' (o.g.); Melenhorst 45+3'; Chukwu 45+8'; Tarasco 85'

Estadio Alejandro Morera Soto, Alajuela
Referee: Crystal Sobers (Trinidad and Tobago)
31 May 2025
14:00 (Note: The match was interrupted at the 30th minute due to adverse weather conditions. Play resumed 1 hour later.)

Panama	0–4	Mexico
	Report	Ramírez 2', 43'; Ali. Soto 47' (pen.); Saldívar 86'

Estadio Alejandro Morera Soto, Alajuela
Referee: Janeishka Caban (Puerto Rico)

2 June 2025
11:00

Panama	4–1	Nicaragua
Pérez 16', 48'; King 32'; Bello 82'	Report	Ad. Munguia 75'

Estadio Alejandro Morera Soto, Alajuela
Referee: Deily Gómez (Costa Rica)
2 June 2025
14:00 (Note: The match was interrupted at the 30th minute due to adverse weather conditions. Play resumed at 17:10.)

Mexico	4–2	Canada
Okeke 26' (o.g.); M. González 37'; Saldívar 45+2', 84'	Report	Melenhorst 18'; Chukwu 59'

Estadio Alejandro Morera Soto, Alajuela
Referee: Alyssa Nichols (United States)

== Knockout stage ==
In the knockout stage, if a match was tied at the end of 90 minutes, extra time was played, and if still tied after extra time, the match would be decided by a penalty shoot-out (Regulations Article 12.10).

=== Bracket ===
Semi-finals
6 June – Alajuela
Mexico	4
Costa Rica	0
6 June – Alajuela
United States	0
Canada	1

Final
8 June – Alajuela
Mexico	2
Canada (a.e.t.)	3

=== Semi-finals ===
6 June 2025
09:30

United States	0–1	Canada
	Report	Larouche 56'

Estadio Alejandro Morera Soto, Alajuela
Referee: Janeishka Caban (Puerto Rico)

6 June 2025
12:30

Mexico	4–0	Costa Rica
Saldívar 6'; Muñoz 26'; Ali. Soto 44', 78'	Report

Estadio Alejandro Morera Soto, Alajuela
Referee: Vimarest Díaz (Dominican Republic)

=== Final ===
8 June 2025
11:30

Mexico	2–3 (a.e.t.)	Canada
Saldívar 61' (pen.), 98'	Report	Gibson 50'; Bianchin 96'; Chukwu 120+2'

Estadio Alejandro Morera Soto, Alajuela
Referee: Dilia Bradley (Guatemala)

2025 CONCACAF Women's U-20 Championship winners

Canada
Third title

== Goalscorers ==
There were 76 goals scored in 15 matches, for an average of 5.07 goals per match.

8 goals

- (Mexico) Montserrat Saldívar

5 goals

- (Canada) Annabelle Chukwu
- (Costa Rica) Sheika Scott

4 goals

- (Mexico) Alice Soto
- (United States) Izzy Engle

3 goals

- (United States) Mary Long

2 goals

- (Canada) Léa Larouche
- (Canada) Teegan Melenhorst
- (Canada) Liana Tarasco
- (Costa Rica) Emma Azofeifa
- (Mexico) Abril Fragoso
- (Mexico) Deiry Ramírez
- (Panama) Sherline King
- (Panama) Kayra Pérez
- (Puerto Rico) Gabriella Garnett
- (Puerto Rico) Ashley McMahon
- (Puerto Rico) Susana Roberts
- (United States) Kennedy Fuller
- (United States) Linda Ullmark

1 goal

- (Canada) Adriana Bianchin
- (Canada) Jadea Collin
- (Canada) Sienna Gibson
- (Canada) Jeneva Hernandez Gray
- (Canada) Stephanie Schoeley
- (Costa Rica) Daniela Ocampo
- (Costa Rica) Lucía Paniagua
- (Mexico) María González
- (Mexico) Natalia Muñoz
- (Mexico) Julia Valadez
- (Nicaragua) Adriana Munguia
- (Nicaragua) Jennifer Sarantes
- (Panama) Nathalie Bello
- (Puerto Rico) Aurora Gaines
- (Puerto Rico) Estefanía González
- (United States) Emma Johnson
- (United States) Grace Restovich
- (United States) Katie Scott
- (United States) Sealey Strawn

1 own goal

- (Canada) Janet Okeke (against Mexico)
- (Nicaragua) Adriana Munguia (against Canada)

Source: CONCACAF

== Qualified teams for FIFA U-20 Women's World Cup ==
The following four teams from CONCACAF qualified for the 2026 FIFA U-20 Women's World Cup in Poland.

Team	Qualified on	Previous appearances in FIFA U-20 Women's World Cup^{1}
Canada	31 May 2025	9 (2002, 2004, 2006, 2008, 2012, 2014, 2016, 2022, 2024)
Mexico	31 May 2025	10 (2002, 2006, 2008, 2010, 2012, 2014, 2016, 2018, 2022, 2024)
United States	1 June 2025	11 (**2002**, 2004, 2006, **2008**, 2010, **2012**, 2014, 2016, 2018, 2022, 2024)
Costa Rica	3 June 2025	4 (2010, 2014, 2022, 2024)

^{1} Bold indicates champions for that year. Italic indicates hosts for that year.

== Awards ==
Golden Ball	Golden Boot	Golden Glove
(Mexico) Montserrat Saldívar	(Mexico) Montserrat Saldívar	(Canada) Noelle Henning
CONCACAF Fair Play Award
Canada

Best XI
Goalkeeper	Defenders	Midfielders	Forwards
(Canada) Noelle Henning	(Canada) Jadea Collin; (Puerto Rico) Estefanía González; (United States) Katie Scott	(Canada) Teegan Melenhorst; (Mexico) Abril Fragoso; (Mexico) Alice Soto; (United States) Linda Ullmark	(Canada) Annabelle Chukwu; (Costa Rica) Sheika Scott; (Mexico) Montserrat Saldívar
