= Annabelle Chukwu =

Canadian soccer player (born 2007)

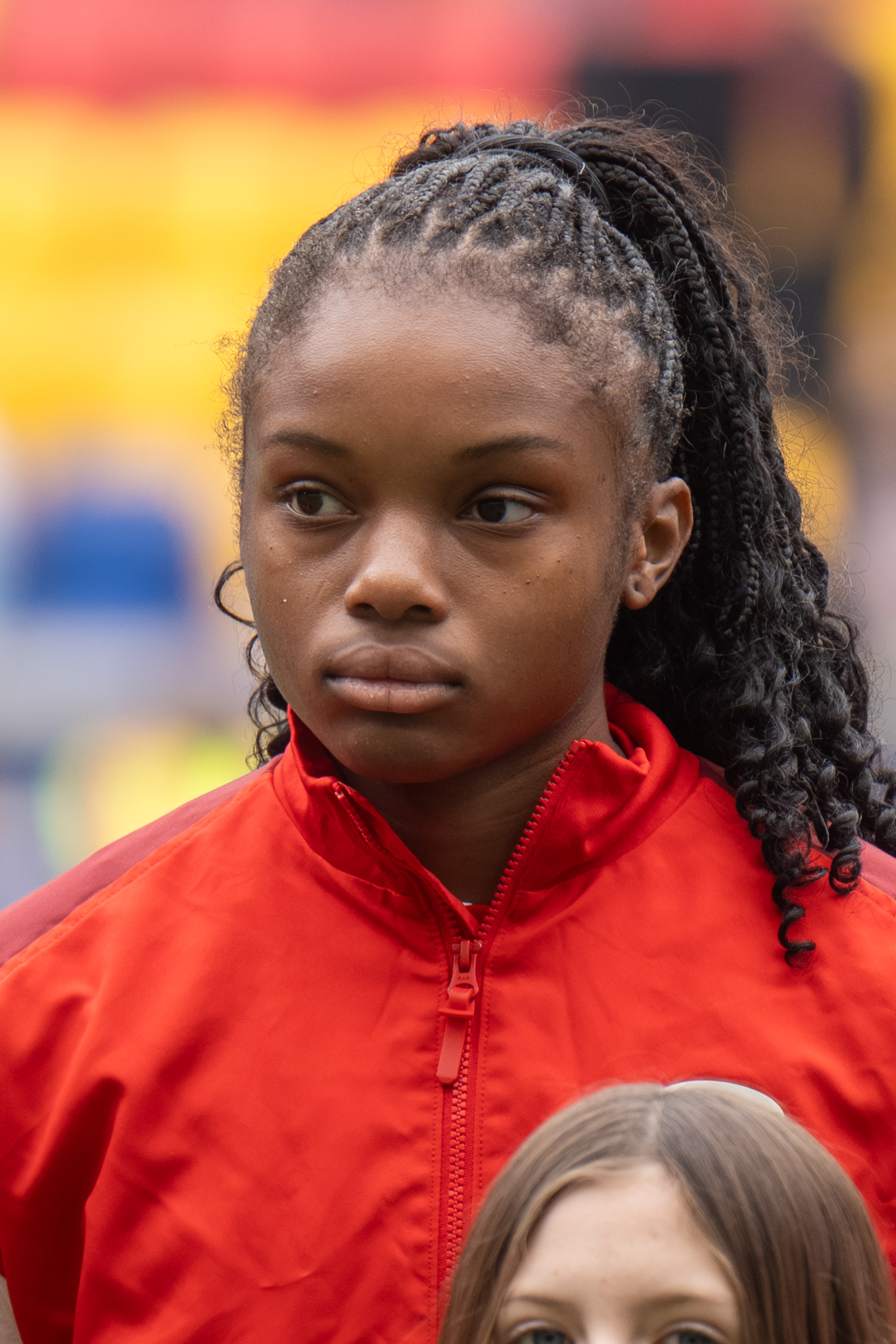
- Chukwu with Canada in 2026

Personal information
- Full name: Chinonyerem Annabelle Chukwu
- Date of birth: February 8, 2007 (age 19)
- Place of birth: Gravesend, England
- Height: 1.68 m (5 ft 6 in)
- Position: Forward

Team information
- Current team: Notre Dame Fighting Irish
- Number: 7

Youth career
- 2017–2022: Ottawa South United
- 2022–2024: NDC Ontario

College career
Years	Team	Apps	(Gls)
2024–	Notre Dame Fighting Irish	34	(15)

Senior career*
Years	Team	Apps	(Gls)
2023–2024	NDC Ontario	24	(12)
2025–	Ottawa South United	3	(0)

International career^{‡}
2022	Canada U15	3	(1)
2022–	Canada U17	10	(11)
2023–	Canada U20	17	(22)
2025–	Canada	7	(2)
- * Club domestic league appearances and goals as of August 15, 2025 ‡ National team caps and goals as of April 18, 2026

Chinonyerem Annabelle Chukwu (born February 8, 2007) is a soccer player who plays as a forward for the Notre Dame Fighting Irish and the Canada national team. Born in England and raised in Ottawa, she began playing organized soccer with Ottawa South United and later entered Canada Soccer's National Development Centre Ontario program.

Chukwu played senior club soccer for NDC Ontario in League1 Ontario before joining Notre Dame in 2024. She scored 12 goals in 2025 and received first-team All-ACC and second-team All-American honours.

At international level, Chukwu represented Canada at under-15, under-17 and under-20 level. She surpassed Christine Sinclair's Canadian youth-international record of 27 goals at the 2024 U-20 World Cup and captained Canada to the 2025 CONCACAF Women's U-20 Championship, scoring the winning goal in the final against Mexico. After receiving her first senior call-up at age 15, she made her senior debut in June 2025 and scored her first two senior international goals in a 4–0 win over Zambia in April 2026.

== Early life ==
Chukwu's early development was closely linked to her family's move to Canada and to training alongside her twin sister. Chukwu was born in London and grew up in Gravesend, Kent, to an English-born mother and a Nigerian-born father. She and her twin sister, Isabelle, moved with their family to Ottawa in 2016, when they were nine. The sisters had little prior interest in organized sport, but began playing soccer at recess at Ottawa Christian School. After they played for the school at tournaments, they were encouraged to try out for Ottawa South United (OSU) and both joined its under-12 Ontario Player Development League team.

== Youth career ==
Chukwu developed as a central forward in OSU's youth program, while Isabelle generally played in wider positions. In 2021, Chukwu scored 46 goals in 15 under-14 OPDL matches, winning the division's scoring title. OSU won the under-14 OPDL league championship and the Gary Miller Charity Shield. Chukwu scored the opening goal in the Shield final against Markham SC, a 3–1 victory in which she and Isabelle combined for all three OSU goals.

The sisters also played for OSU's under-15 team during the 2021 season. That team reached the corresponding Charity Shield final, where it lost to Markham in a penalty shoot-out.

Chukwu won a second consecutive OPDL scoring title in 2022, recording 39 goals in 17 under-15 matches. She finished 14 goals ahead of the division's next-highest scorer despite missing several matches on international duty with Canada. OSU retained the under-15 OPDL Premier Division title and won the soccer competition at the Ontario Summer Games, where Chukwu was the leading scorer.

== College career ==
Chukwu's collegiate career developed from a disrupted freshman season into national recognition as a sophomore. She committed to the University of Notre Dame in Indiana in November 2023, choosing the school for its combination of academics and player development. She scored nine minutes into her collegiate debut, a 2–1 loss to Michigan State on August 15, 2024. Her participation in the 2024 U-20 World Cup caused her to miss six Notre Dame matches at the beginning of the campaign. After returning, she started 11 of 16 appearances, scoring three goals and making two assists. Across 946 minutes, she registered eight points and produced her first three-point collegiate performance in a 3–3 draw at top-ranked Duke. The Atlantic Coast Conference selected her for its All-Freshman Team and third-team All-ACC. The season ended in the NCAA quarter-finals, where Notre Dame lost to Stanford. Her three goals came in the opener against Michigan State, a draw at Boston College and the draw at Duke; the latter performance also included an assist.

Her role and output increased substantially in 2025, when she appeared in each of Notre Dame's 20 matches. Chukwu became Notre Dame's second-leading scorer with 12 goals and three assists. Six of her goals were match-winners, the second-highest total in the ACC, and she received first-team All-ACC and ACC Championship All-Tournament honours as Notre Dame reached the conference final. She scored her first collegiate hat-trick in a 3–0 win at Michigan State, converting each of her three shots, and twice received ACC co-offensive player of the week recognition. She also made the Hermann Trophy midseason watch list and United Soccer Coaches' first All-Atlantic Region team. United Soccer Coaches named her a second-team All-American, her first national collegiate honour. Notre Dame finished 15–2–3, reached the ACC final and returned to the NCAA tournament.

== Club career ==
=== NDC Ontario ===
Chukwu joined NDC Ontario in August 2022 after being selected for Canada Soccer's Ontario Regional Excel Super Centre program. She and her twin sister, Isabelle, moved to the Toronto area, where they trained in the national development environment and attended Bill Crothers Secondary School. Chukwu later said that the move exposed her to a higher level of competition while allowing her to continue developing alongside several former Ottawa South United teammates.

She began competing for NDC's senior side in League1 Ontario in 2023. Chukwu made eight regular-season appearances and scored five goals, all of them in a 10–1 victory over ProStars FC on July 16. NDC finished first in the regular-season standings with a 14–3–1 record. Chukwu then scored twice in the playoff semi-final as the team advanced to the championship match, where it lost 2–1 to Alliance United after extra time.

Chukwu remained with NDC in 2024 and helped the team regain the Premier Division regular-season title. NDC secured first place with two matches remaining, finished eight points clear and remained unbeaten from the beginning of the season through the end of its league schedule. She finished her two senior seasons with NDC with 12 goals and was described by League1 Canada as an important member of the 2024 title-winning side. Following the season, League1 Ontario named Chukwu a second-team all-star and one of four finalists for its Forward of the Year award.

=== Ottawa South United ===
In August 2022, Chukwu and four former OSU teammates entered Canada Soccer's Ontario Regional Excel Super Centre, later NDC Ontario. She and Isabelle moved to the Toronto area for the program, ending her first full-time spell with OSU. Chukwu returned to OSU during the 2025 college off-season for its inaugural Ligue1 Québec campaign, alongside Isabelle and other university players. Her participation was limited by Canada's under-20 and senior-team commitments.

== International career ==
=== Youth teams ===
Chukwu entered Canada's youth system with her sister at the 2022 CONCACAF Girls' U-15 Championship. She scored in a 5–0 opening win over Jamaica and assisted Isabelle in a 4–1 victory over Puerto Rico; Canada finished second after losing the final 4–1 to the United States.

Two months later, Chukwu played at the 2022 FIFA U-17 Women's World Cup. On her under-17 debut, she entered as a substitute and equalized in Canada's 1–1 group-stage draw with France. She returned to the age group for the 2024 CONCACAF Women's U-17 Championship, scoring six goals, including a hat-trick against Puerto Rico. She scored in the 75th minute of the semi-final against Mexico to force extra time, but Canada lost 2–1 and did not qualify for the U-17 World Cup.

Her under-20 record became the defining part of her youth international career. Chukwu moved up to the under-20 team for the 2023 CONCACAF Women's U-20 Championship. In the third-place match against Costa Rica, she scored twice in extra time as Canada won 5–3 and qualified for the 2024 U-20 World Cup. At the World Cup in Colombia, she scored a late equalizer in a 3–3 draw with France and a first-half hat-trick in Canada's 9–0 victory over Fiji. Those four goals took her youth-international total to 28, surpassing Christine Sinclair's previous record of 27. The Fiji result was Canada's largest victory at the tournament and its first U-20 World Cup win since 2014. Canada advanced to the round of 16, where it lost 2–1 to defending champion Spain.

At the 2025 CONCACAF U-20 Championship, She scored a hat-trick against Trinidad and Tobago to secure qualification for the regional championship, then scored five goals in five matches at the finals in Costa Rica. In the final, she scored in the 122nd minute to give Canada a 3–2 extra-time win over Mexico, its third CONCACAF U-20 title and first since 2008; CONCACAF subsequently selected her for the tournament's Best XI.

Her winning goal also secured Canada's place at the 2026 global tournament. At the 2026 FIFA U-20 Women's World Cup, Chukwu appeared in her third FIFA youth tournament. She scored once in a 1–1 draw with England and twice in a 6–0 win over Tanzania, advancing Canada to the round of 16.

=== Senior team ===
Chukwu's senior involvement began three years before her debut, reflecting her selection as a prospect while she continued to play age-group football. Chukwu first joined the senior national team at age 15 for two away friendlies against Brazil in November 2022, but did not play. A second call-up followed for the September 2023 Olympic qualification play-off against Jamaica after Deanne Rose withdrew injured; Chukwu again remained uncapped.

After taking her youth record to 39 goals in 42 appearances by the end of the 2025 CONCACAF championship, Chukwu was recalled by coach Casey Stoney in June 2025. She made her senior debut on June 27 as a second-half substitute in a 4–1 win over Costa Rica in Toronto and contributed to the move that produced Canada's second goal.

On April 11, 2026, she scored her first two senior international goals in a 4–0 FIFA Series win over Zambia in Cuiabá, Brazil.

== Personal life ==
Chukwu's family background and twin relationship have been the main subjects of published coverage of her life away from competition. Her twin sister, Isabelle, has also represented Canada at youth level. They developed together at Ottawa South United and NDC Ontario before attending different American universities in 2024—Annabelle at Notre Dame and Isabelle at Brown—after independently choosing programs suited to their academic and sporting priorities. They described their familiarity as helpful on the field, while attributing it to years of shared practice rather than an unexplained connection. Their separation marked the first extended period in which the sisters had not trained or played together; both described the transition as difficult but expressed pride in the other's opportunity. The twins said the choice to attend separate institutions was not planned; each evaluated offers independently.

Chukwu described education as central to her university decision, alongside the opportunity to continue developing as a player.

== Career statistics ==
=== International ===
As of match played April 18, 2026

International goals by Annabelle Chukwu
No.	Date	Venue	Opponent	Score	Result	Competition
1	April 11, 2026	Arena Pantanal, Cuiabá, Brazil	Zambia	3–0	4–0	FIFA Series
2	April 11, 2026	Arena Pantanal, Cuiabá, Brazil	Zambia	4–0	4–0	FIFA Series

== Honours ==
Canada U-20

- CONCACAF Women's U-20 Championship: 2025

Individual

- United Soccer Coaches second-team All-American: 2025
- First-team All-ACC: 2025; third-team All-ACC: 2024
- ACC Championship All-Tournament Team: 2025
- CONCACAF Women's U-20 Championship Best XI: 2025
