= Michelle Enyeart =

American soccer player

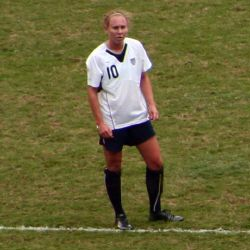

Personal information
- Full name: Michelle Enyeart
- Date of birth: July 26, 1988 (age 38)
- Place of birth: Eugene, Oregon, United States
- Height: 5 ft 5 in (1.65 m)
- Position: Forward

Youth career
- Laguna Hills Eclipse

College career
| Years | Team | Apps | (Gls) |
| 2006–2009 | Portland Pilots | | |

International career
| 2007–2008 | United States U-20 | 24 | (9) |
| 2009 | United States U-23 | | |
Medal record
Representing United States
Women's Football
Pan American Games
| Silver medal – second place | 2007 Rio de Janeiro | Team competition |

Michelle Enyeart (born July 26, 1988) is an American soccer player from Hemet, California. She was a forward for the University of Portland women's soccer team and the United States U-20 women's national soccer team.

== Career ==
=== National Team career ===
Enyeart was a member of the United States U-20 women's national soccer team from 2006 to 2008, and competed in the 2007 Pan American Games and the 2008 FIFA U-20 Women's World Cup in Chile.

She is currently ranked ninth all-time in goals scored for the U-20 women's national team, with nine international goals. Six of those goals came during the 2008 CONCACAF Women's U-20 Championship in Puebla, Mexico, where she tied with United States teammate Kelley O'Hara as the top scorer of the tournament.

=== Professional career ===
Enyeart was drafted 14th overall at the 2010 WPS Draft by the Los Angeles Sol. The Sol ceased operations on January 28, 2010; in the ensuing dispersal draft, Enyeart was picked up by the Boston Breakers. Due to a severe leg injury suffered near the end of her last season with the Portland Pilots, Enyeart was not placed on the Breakers' roster proper, but her rights have been retained by the club.
