= 2008 CONCACAF Women's U-20 Championship =

Tournament details
- Host country: Mexico
- City: Puebla City
- Dates: June 17–28
- Teams: 8 (from 1 confederation)
- Venue: 1 (in 1 host city)

Final positions
- Champions: Canada (2nd title)
- Runners-up: United States
- Third place: Mexico
- Fourth place: Costa Rica

Tournament statistics
- Matches played: 16
- Goals scored: 70 (4.38 per match)
- Attendance: 38,550 (2,409 per match)
- Top scorer(s): (Jamaica) Shakira Duncan (United States) Michelle Enyeart (United States) Kelley O'Hara (6 goals each)

The 2008 CONCACAF Women's U-20 Championship was the 4th edition of the CONCACAF Women's U-20 Championship, the biennial international youth football championship organised by CONCACAF for the women's under-20 national teams of the North, Central American and Caribbean region. The top three sides also earned qualification to the 2008 FIFA U-20 Women's World Cup.

The tournament was held from June 17 to June 28, 2008. It featured eight teams and was played entirely at the Estadio Cuauhtémoc in Puebla City, Mexico. The tournament was won by Canada, who defeated the United States in the final by a score of 1–0. Mexico secured the final qualification spot by defeating Costa Rica in the third-place match.

== Draw ==
The draw for the tournament was held on May 6, 2008, at the CONCACAF Offices of the General Secretariat in New York City. The eight teams which entered the group stage were drawn into two groups of four teams. The hosts, Mexico, were drawn into Group A along with Cuba, Trinidad and Tobago, and the United States, while Canada, Costa Rica, Jamaica, and Nicaragua were drawn into Group B. The schedule was announced on May 14, 2008.

== Group stage ==
=== Group A ===
Team	Pts	Pld	W	D	L	GF	GA	GD
United States	9	3	3	0	0	16	0	16
Mexico	6	3	2	0	1	10	3	7
Trinidad and Tobago	3	3	1	0	2	6	8	−2
Cuba	0	3	0	0	3	1	22	−21

June 18, 2008
13:00

Trinidad and Tobago	0–4	United States
	Report	Enyeart 8', 29', 75'; O'Hara 31'

Estadio Cuauhtémoc, Puebla
Attendance: 300
Referee: Dianne Ferreira-James (Guyana)

June 18, 2008
15:30

Mexico	7–0	Cuba
Corral 8', 32', 52'; Mondragón 10' (pen.); Mayor 17'; Godoy 65', 85' (pen.)	Report

Estadio Cuauhtémoc, Puebla
Attendance: 4,500
Referee: Carol-Anne Chenard (Canada)

June 20, 2008
13:00

United States	9–0	Cuba
Morgan 2'; Fuentes 32' (o.g.); Washington 42'; O'Hara 46', 54', 80'; Enyeart 60', 67'; Edwards 72'	Report

Estadio Cuauhtémoc, Puebla
Attendance: 300
Referee: Erika Vargas (Costa Rica)

June 20, 2008
15:30

Mexico	3–0	Trinidad and Tobago
García 3', 66'; Mercado 62'	Report

Estadio Cuauhtémoc, Puebla
Attendance: 3,000
Referee: Juana Padilla (Honduras)

June 22, 2008
12:00

Cuba	1–6	Trinidad and Tobago
Gallardo 66'	Report	Cordner 9', 19'; Noel 37'; Mascall 56', 76'; Warrick 78'

Estadio Cuauhtémoc, Puebla
Attendance: 500
Referee: Carol-Ann Chenard (Canada)

June 22, 2008
14:30

Mexico	0–3	United States
	Report	O'Hara 8'; Enyeart 68'; Washington 88'

Estadio Cuauhtémoc, Puebla
Attendance: 12,000
Referee: Shane DeSilva (Trinidad and Tobago)

=== Group B ===
Team	Pts	Pld	W	D	L	GF	GA	GD
Canada	9	3	3	0	0	9	1	8
Costa Rica	6	3	2	0	1	6	7	−1
Jamaica	3	3	1	0	2	8	6	2
Nicaragua	0	3	0	0	3	2	11	−9

June 17, 2008
13:00

Nicaragua	0–2	Canada
	Report	Lam-Feist 9'; Adams 89'

Estadio Cuauhtémoc, Puebla
Attendance: 500
Referee: Shane DeSilva (Trinidad and Tobago)
June 17, 2008
15:30

Costa Rica	3–1	Jamaica
Rodríguez 33'; Alvarado 53'; Venegas 76'	Report	Duncan 11'

Estadio Cuauhtémoc, Puebla
Attendance: 500
Referee: Jennifer Bennett (United States)

June 19, 2008
13:00

Canada	3–1	Jamaica
Lam-Feist 13'; Stewart 42', 77'	Report	Duncan 27'

Estadio Cuauhtémoc, Puebla
Attendance: 100
Referee: Jennifer Bennett (United States)
June 19, 2008
15:30

Costa Rica	3–2	Nicaragua
Granados 5'; Gonzalez 60'; Acosta 68'	Report	Acevedo 34'; Pérez 53'

Estadio Cuauhtémoc, Puebla
Attendance: 300
Referee: Cecibel Ortega (El Salvador)

June 21, 2008
12:00

Jamaica	6–0	Nicaragua
Parker 3', 61'; Duncan 7', 45', 72', 76'	Report

Estadio Cuauhtémoc, Puebla
Attendance: 200
Referee: Quetzali Alvarado (Mexico)
June 21, 2008
14:30

Canada	4–0	Costa Rica
Filigno 12', 34', 65'; Schacher 87'	Report

Estadio Cuauhtémoc, Puebla
Attendance: 350
Referee: Dianne Ferreira-James (Guyana)

== Knockout stage ==
=== Semi-finals ===
June 25, 2008
13:00

United States	4–0	Costa Rica
Klingenberg 4'; Wells 15'; O'Hara 20'; McDonald 44'	Report

Estadio Cuauhtémoc, Puebla
Attendance: 1,000
Referee: Shane DeSilva (Trinidad and Tobago)

June 25, 2008
15:30

Canada	2–1	Mexico
Robinson 46'; Filigno 77'	Report	Corral 66'

Estadio Cuauhtémoc, Puebla
Attendance: 5,000
Referee: Dianne Ferreira-James (Guyana)

=== 3rd place ===
June 28, 2008
12:00

Costa Rica	2–2 (a.e.t.)	Mexico
R. Rodríguez 48', 102'	Report	García 29'; Mendoza 117'
Penalties
Y. Rodríguez (penalty missed); A. Rodríguez (penalty scored); Acosta (penalty scored); Granados (penalty missed); Venegas (penalty missed)	2–3	(penalty missed) Mondragón; (penalty scored) Mercado; (penalty missed) Gallegos; (penalty scored) Corral; (penalty scored) Mayor

Estadio Cuauhtémoc, Puebla
Attendance: 5,000
Referee: Dianne Ferreira-James (Guyana)

=== Final ===
June 28, 2008
14:30

Canada	1–0	United States
Schacher 45+'	Report

Estadio Cuauhtémoc, Puebla
Attendance: 5,000
Referee: Erika Vargas (Costa Rica)

== Winners ==
2008 CONCACAF Women's U-20 Championship winners

Canada
Second title

== Goalscorers ==
There were 70 goals scored in 16 matches, for an average of 4.38 goals per match.

6 goals

- (Jamaica) Shakira Duncan
- (United States) Michelle Enyeart
- (United States) Kelley O'Hara

4 goals

- (Mexico) Charlyn Corral
- (Canada) Jonelle Filigno

3 goals

- (Mexico) Claudia García
- (Costa Rica) Raquel Rodríguez

2 goals

- (Trinidad and Tobago) Kennya Cordner
- (Mexico) Liliana Godoy
- (Canada) Monica Lam-Feist
- (Trinidad and Tobago) Dernelle Mascall
- (Jamaica) Kimmia Parker
- (Canada) Karla Schacher
- (Canada) Chelsea Stewart
- (United States) Nikki Washington

1 goal

- (Nicaragua) Julissa Acevedo
- (Costa Rica) Wendy Acosta
- (Canada) Paige Adams
- (Costa Rica) Katherine Alvarado
- (United States) Becky Edwards
- (Cuba) Yezenia Gallardo
- (Costa Rica) Cristín Granados
- (Mexico) Sharon Gonzalez
- (United States) Meghan Klingenberg
- (Mexico) Liliana Mercado
- (United States) Alex Morgan
- (Mexico) Stephany Mayor
- (United States) Jessica McDonald
- (Mexico) Susana Mendoza
- (Mexico) Yalú Mondragón
- (Trinidad and Tobago) Nikeisha Noel
- (Nicaragua) Maryury Pérez
- (Canada) Jodi-Ann Robinson
- (Costa Rica) Adriana Venegas
- (Trinidad and Tobago) Shanelle Warrick
- (United States) Ingrid Wells

1 own goal

- (Cuba) Yareni Fuentes

Source: CONCACAF
