= Mexico women's national under-20 football team =

Selected team of Mexican football players under 20 years

Mexico Women's U-20
- Nickname(s): El Tri (The Tri); El Tricolor (The Tricolor)
- Association: Federación Mexicana de Fútbol
- Confederation: CONCACAF (North America)
- Head coach: Vacant
- FIFA code: MEX
First colours	Second colours

First international
- Mexico 1–1 Jamaica (Port of Spain, Trinidad and Tobago; 7 May 2002)

Biggest win
- Mexico 12–1 Grenada (Santo Domingo, Dominican Republic; 1 March 2020)

Biggest defeat
- Mexico 1–9 Germany (Moscow, Russia; 21 August 2006)

CONCACAF Women's U-20 Championship
- Appearances: 13 (first in 2002)
- Best result: Champions (2018, 2023)

FIFA U-20 Women's World Cup
- Appearances: 11 (first in 2002)
- Best result: Quarter-finals (2010, 2012, 2016, 2022)

The Mexico U-20 women's national football team is the national women's under-20 football team of Mexico and is managed by the Mexican Football Federation. Dorival Bueno is the current manager of the team.

The team has reached the quarter-finals in the FIFA U-20 Women's World Cup on four occasions and has won the CONCACAF Women's U-20 Championship twice.

Most members of the current squad play in the Liga MX Femenil, per the league's 1000-minute requirement for young players.

== Results and fixtures ==
Legend

Win Draw Lose Fixture

== Players ==
=== Current squad ===
The following 21 players were named to the squad for the 2026 FIFA U-20 Women's World Cup.

No.	Pos.	Player	Date of birth (age)	Caps	Goals	Club
1	GK	Mariangela Medina	9 May 2006 (aged 20)	0	0	(United States Soccer Federation) UCLA Bruins
12	GK	Camila Vazquez	17 July 2007 (aged 19)	0	0	(Mexican Football Federation) Atlas
21	GK	Valentina Murrieta	22 October 2008 (aged 17)	0	0	(Mexican Football Federation) América
2	DF	Michel Fong	2 June 2006 (aged 20)	0	0	(Mexican Football Federation) Tijuana
3	DF	Natalia Muñoz	10 March 2007 (aged 19)	0	0	(Mexican Football Federation) Tigres UANL
4	DF	Berenice Ibarra	24 October 2008 (aged 17)	0	0	(Mexican Football Federation) Pachuca
5	DF	Ana Torres	9 May 2007 (aged 19)	0	0	(Mexican Football Federation) Atlante
7	DF	Maria Gonzalez	9 August 2006 (aged 20)	0	0	(Mexican Football Federation) Tigres UANL
13	DF	Ashlee Mora	11 August 2006 (aged 20)	0	0	(United States Soccer Federation) UTEP Miners
15	DF	Mia Villalpando	10 May 2008 (aged 18)	0	0	(Mexican Football Federation) Tigres UANL
18	DF	Arantza Segura	3 August 2007 (aged 19)	0	0	(Mexican Football Federation) América
20	DF	Alexa Martinez	31 October 2008 (aged 17)	0	0	(Mexican Football Federation) Pachuca
6	MF	Julia Valadez	6 April 2006 (aged 20)	0	0	(Mexican Football Federation) Pachuca
8	MF	Abril Fragoso	15 May 2007 (aged 19)	0	0	(Mexican Football Federation) Pachuca
11	MF	Monique Montes	30 August 2007 (aged 19)	0	0	(Mexican Football Federation) Monterrey
14	MF	Alexa Soto	20 March 2007 (aged 19)	0	0	(Mexican Football Federation) América
16	MF	Noemi Villalobos	5 December 2006 (aged 19)	0	0	(Mexican Football Federation) Atlas
9	FW	Deiry Ramirez	30 June 2006 (aged 20)	0	0	(Mexican Football Federation) Tigres UANL
10	FW	Alice Soto	26 March 2006 (aged 20)	0	0	(Mexican Football Federation) Monterrey
17	FW	Jalen Chaney	1 October 2006 (aged 19)	0	0	(United States Soccer Federation) Creighton Bluejays
19	FW	Montserrat Saldivar	20 September 2006 (aged 19)	0	0	(Mexican Football Federation) América

== Honours ==
- CONCACAF Women's U-20 Championship
  - (gold) Champions (2): 2018, 2023
  - (silver) Runners-up (5): 2010, 2014, 2020, 2022, 2025
  - (bronze) Third place (4): 2006, 2008, 2012, 2015

== Competitive record ==
=== FIFA U-20 Women's World Cup ===
Year	Result	Pld	W	D	L	GF	GA
(Canada) 2002	Group stage	3	0	0	3	5	10
(Thailand) 2004	Did not qualify						
(Russia) 2006	Group stage	3	1	0	2	5	15
(Chile) 2008	Group stage	3	0	0	3	2	12
(Germany) 2010	Quarter-finals	4	1	2	1	6	7
(Japan) 2012	Quarter-finals	4	2	0	2	7	5
(Canada) 2014	Group stage	3	0	2	1	3	4
(Papua New Guinea) 2016	Quarter-finals	4	2	0	2	6	7
(France) 2018	Group stage	3	1	0	2	5	10
(Costa Rica) 2022	Quarter-finals	4	1	2	1	2	2
(Colombia) 2024	Round of 16	4	1	1	2	6	6
(Poland) 2026	Group stage	3	0	1	2	5	7
Total	11/12	38	9	8	21	52	85

=== CONCACAF Women's U-20 Championship ===
CONCACAF Women's U-20 Championship record
Year	Result	Matches	Wins	Draws	Losses	GF	GA
(Trinidad and Tobago) 2002	Group winners	3	2	1	0	9	2
(Canada) 2004	Fourth place	5	2	0	3	14	16
(Mexico) 2006	Third Place	5	3	0	2	18	7
(Mexico) 2008	Third Place	5	3	0	2	13	7
(Guatemala) 2010	Runners-up	5	3	0	2	6	4
(Panama) 2012	Third Place	5	3	0	2	18	6
(Cayman Islands) 2014	Runners-up	5	4	0	1	22	6
(Honduras) 2015	Third Place	5	3	1	1	11	2
(Trinidad and Tobago) 2018	Champions	5	4	0	1	9	4
(Dominican Republic) 2020	Runners-up	7	6	0	1	27	7
(Dominican Republic) 2022	Runners-up	7	6	0	1	28	3
(Dominican Republic) 2023	Champions	5	5	0	0	15	2
(Costa Rica) 2025	Runners-up	5	4	0	1	20	5
Total	13/13	67	48	2	17	210	71

== Head-to-head record ==
The following table shows Mexico's head-to-head record in the FIFA U-20 Women's World Cup.

Opponent	Pld	W	D	L	GF	GA	GD	Win %
Argentina	1	0	0	1	2	3	−1	0.00
Australia	1	1	0	0	2	0	+2	100.00
Benin	1	0	1	0	2	2	+0	0.00
Brazil	3	1	0	2	6	12	−6	33.33
Cameroon	1	0	1	0	2	2	+0	0.00
Colombia	2	0	1	1	0	1	−1	0.00
England	3	1	1	1	3	7	−4	33.33
France	1	0	0	1	1	2	−1	0.00
Germany	4	1	0	3	3	15	−12	25.00
Japan	2	0	1	1	4	7	−3	0.00
New Zealand	2	1	1	0	5	1	+4	50.00
Nigeria	3	0	2	1	2	3	−1	0.00
North Korea	3	0	0	3	2	11	−9	0.00
Norway	1	0	0	1	1	2	−1	0.00
Poland	1	0	0	1	1	2	−1	0.00
South Korea	3	1	0	2	4	5	−1	33.33
Spain	1	0	0	1	0	1	−1	0.00
Switzerland	2	2	0	0	6	2	+4	100.00
United States	2	0	0	2	3	5	−2	0.00
Venezuela	1	1	0	0	3	2	+1	100.00
Total	38	9	8	21	52	85	−33	23.68
