= 2018 CONCACAF Women's U-20 Championship squads =

This is a list of the squads for the 2018 CONCACAF Women's U-20 Championship, which was held in Trinidad and Tobago between 18–28 January 2018. The 8 national teams involved in the tournament were required to register a squad of 20 players; only players in these squads were eligible to take part in the tournament.

Players marked (c) were named as captain for their national squad.

== Group A ==
=== Trinidad and Tobago ===
Coach: (Trinidad and Tobago) Jamaal Shabazz

No.	Pos.	Player	Date of birth (age)	Club
1	GK	Klil Keshwar	17 July 2000 (aged 17)	(Trinidad and Tobago Football Association) Trincity Nationals
20	GK	Malaika Dedier	26 March 1999 (aged 18)	(Trinidad and Tobago Football Association) St Augustine FC
2	DF	Crystal Molineaux	1 February 1999 (aged 18)	
3	DF	Cecily Stoute	26 October 1999 (aged 18)	(United States Soccer Federation) NASA Tophat
4	DF	Natisha John (c)	6 May 2000 (aged 17)	(Trinidad and Tobago Football Association) Trincity Nationals
5	DF	Nathifa Hackshaw	23 May 2001 (aged 16)	(Trinidad and Tobago Football Association) St Augustine FC
6	DF	Shaunalee Govia	2 January 1998 (aged 20)	(Trinidad and Tobago Football Association) St Ann's Rangers
12	DF	Jaasiel Forde		(Trinidad and Tobago Football Association) Trincity Nationals
18	DF	Brittney Williams	1 December 1999 (aged 18)	(Trinidad and Tobago Football Association) St Ann's Rangers
8	MF	Megan Rampersad	16 June 2000 (aged 17)	(United States Soccer Federation) Wellington Wave
11	MF	Ranae Ward	7 November 1999 (aged 18)	(Trinidad and Tobago Football Association) St Ann's Rangers
13	MF	Shenieka Paul		(Trinidad and Tobago Football Association) FC Petrotrin
14	MF	Kédie Johnson	19 November 2000 (aged 17)	(Trinidad and Tobago Football Association) St Augustine FC
15	MF	Asha James	5 December 1999 (aged 18)	(Trinidad and Tobago Football Association) Jewels FC
16	MF	Kelsey Henry		(Trinidad and Tobago Football Association) St Augustine FC
17	MF	Alexis Fortune		(Canadian Soccer Association) Brams UTD
19	MF	Chelcy Ralph	15 December 1998 (aged 19)	(Trinidad and Tobago Football Association) Club Sando
7	FW	Dennecia Prince	10 August 1998 (aged 19)	(Trinidad and Tobago Football Association) Trincity Nationals
9	FW	Lauren Theodore		(Trinidad and Tobago Football Association) St Augustine FC
10	FW	Aaliyah Prince	5 February 2001 (aged 16)	(Trinidad and Tobago Football Association) Step By Step

=== Haiti ===
Coach: (Martinique) Marc Collat

No.	Pos.	Player	Date of birth (age)	Club
1	GK	Kerly Théus	7 January 1999 (aged 19)	(Haitian Football Federation) Aigle Brillant
12	GK	Naphtaline Clerméus	1 August 1998 (aged 19)	(Haitian Football Federation) Tigresse
2	DF	Rutnhy Mathurin	14 January 2001 (aged 17)	(Haitian Football Federation) ASF Croix des B
3	DF	Naphtalie Lorthé	21 January 1999 (aged 18)	(Haitian Football Federation) Aigle Brillant
4	DF	Émeline Charles	27 October 1999 (aged 18)	(Haitian Football Federation) Aigle Brillant
5	DF	Tabita Joseph	13 September 2003 (aged 14)	(Haitian Football Federation) ASF Croix des B
6	DF	Betina Petit-Frère	1 August 2003 (aged 14)	(Haitian Football Federation) ASF Croix des B
13	DF	Rosiannae Jean	24 November 1999 (aged 18)	(Haitian Football Federation) Tigresse
16	DF	Taina Gervais	8 November 1999 (aged 18)	(Haitian Football Federation) Tigresse
17	DF	Fléro Surpris	16 January 2003 (aged 15)	(Haitian Football Federation) ASF Croix des B
7	MF	Melissa Dacius	24 May 1999 (aged 18)	(Haitian Football Federation) Tigresse
8	MF	Nelourde Nicolas	26 July 1999 (aged 18)	(Haitian Football Federation) Anacaona Leogane
9	MF	Sherly Jeudy	13 October 1998 (aged 19)	(Haitian Football Federation) Anacaona Leogane
11	MF	Roseline Éloissaint	20 February 1999 (aged 18)	(Haitian Football Federation) Tigresse
14	MF	Rachelle Caremus	3 February 2003 (aged 14)	(Haitian Football Federation) ASF Croix des B
15	MF	Danielle Étienne	16 January 2001 (aged 17)	(United States Soccer Federation) New York City FC
19	MF	Magdala Macean	12 January 1999 (aged 19)	(Haitian Football Federation) Anacaona
20	MF	Dolores Thomas	16 May 1999 (aged 18)	(Haitian Football Federation) Tigresse
10	FW	Nérilia Mondésir (c)	17 January 1999 (aged 19)	(French Football Federation) Montpellier
18	FW	Melchie Dumornay	17 August 2003 (aged 14)	(Haitian Football Federation) ASF Croix des B

=== Costa Rica ===
Coach: (Costa Rica) Amelia Valverde

No.	Pos.	Player	Date of birth (age)	Club
1	GK	Fabiana Solano	22 October 2001 (aged 16)	(Costa Rican Football Federation) AD Desampa 2000
18	GK	Nicole Genis	1 September 2000 (aged 17)	(Costa Rican Football Federation) Dimas
3	DF	Jeimy Umaña	20 February 2001 (aged 16)	(Costa Rican Football Federation) ADFFC
4	DF	María Coto	2 March 1998 (aged 19)	(Costa Rican Football Federation) A.D. Moravia
6	DF	María Elizondo	30 November 1998 (aged 19)	(Costa Rican Football Federation) Deportivo Saprissa
12	DF	Kenlly Villalobos	22 February 1998 (aged 19)	(Costa Rican Football Federation) Deportivo Saprissa
13	DF	Cristel Sandí	23 January 1998 (aged 19)	(Costa Rican Football Federation) Dimas
15	DF	Stephannie Blanco	13 December 2000 (aged 17)	(Costa Rican Football Federation) ADFFC
8	MF	Mariela Campos	7 October 1998 (aged 19)	(Costa Rican Football Federation) A.D. Moravia
10	MF	Gloriana Villalobos (c)	20 August 1999 (aged 18)	(United States Soccer Federation) Florida State Seminoles
11	MF	Juliet Navarro	3 August 1998 (aged 19)	(Costa Rican Football Federation) Codea
14	MF	Hillary Corrales	4 December 1999 (aged 18)	(Costa Rican Football Federation) Dimas
16	MF	Priscila Chinchilla	11 July 2001 (aged 16)	(Costa Rican Football Federation) Arenal
19	MF	Daniela Coto	3 August 1998 (aged 19)	(Costa Rican Football Federation) A.D. Moravia
20	MF	Yaniela Arias	25 April 1998 (aged 19)	(Costa Rican Football Federation) Dimas
2	FW	María Salas	12 July 2002 (aged 15)	(Costa Rican Football Federation) Deportivo Saprissa
5	MF	Fernanda Sanabria	7 June 1999 (aged 18)	(Costa Rican Football Federation) A.D. Moravia
7	FW	Fabiola Villalobos	13 March 1998 (aged 19)	(Costa Rican Football Federation) Deportivo Saprissa
9	FW	Sofía Varela	28 March 1998 (aged 19)	(Costa Rican Football Federation) Dimas
17	FW	Catalina Estrada	11 October 1998 (aged 19)	(Costa Rican Football Federation) San Carlos Femenino

=== Canada ===
Coach: (England) Bev Priestman

No.	Pos.	Player	Date of birth (age)	Club
1	GK	Rylee Foster	13 August 1998 (aged 19)	(United States Soccer Federation) West Virginia University
18	GK	Lysianne Proulx	17 April 1999 (aged 18)	(United States Soccer Federation) Syracuse University
2	DF	Emma Regan	28 January 2000 (aged 17)	(Canadian Soccer Association) Vancouver Whitecaps FC Girls Elite BC Soccer REX
3	DF	Ashley Cathro	19 January 2000 (aged 17)	(Canadian Soccer Association) Vancouver Whitecaps FC Girls Elite BC Soccer REX
5	DF	Hannah Taylor	7 June 1999 (aged 18)	(United States Soccer Federation) University of Oregon
6	DF	Malikae Dayes	29 September 1999 (aged 18)	(United States Soccer Federation) University of Maryland
14	DF	Caitlin Shaw	20 July 2001 (aged 16)	(Canadian Soccer Association) Vancouver Whitecaps FC Girls Elite BC Soccer REX
16	DF	Maya Antoine	8 August 2001 (aged 16)	(Canadian Soccer Association) Vancouver Whitecaps FC Girls Elite BC Soccer REX
17	DF	Nadege L'Esperance	30 March 1999 (aged 18)	(United States Soccer Federation) University of Louisville
19	DF	Ariel Young	30 August 2001 (aged 16)	(Canadian Soccer Association) Ottawa South United
4	MF	Julia Grosso	29 August 2000 (aged 17)	(Canadian Soccer Association) Vancouver Whitecaps FC Girls Elite BC Soccer REX
8	MF	Sarah Stratigakis	7 March 1999 (aged 18)	(United States Soccer Federation) University of Michigan
7	FW	Shana Flynn	21 September 2000 (aged 17)	(Canadian Soccer Association) Unionville-Milliken SC
9	FW	Teni Akindoju	8 July 2001 (aged 16)	(Canadian Soccer Association) Vancouver Whitecaps FC Girls Elite BC Soccer REX
10	FW	Gabrielle Carle (c)	12 October 1998 (aged 19)	(United States Soccer Federation) Florida State University
11	FW	Jayde Riviere	22 January 2001 (aged 16)	(Canadian Soccer Association) Vancouver Whitecaps FC Girls Elite BC Soccer REX
12	FW	Jordyn Huitema	8 May 2001 (aged 16)	(Canadian Soccer Association) Vancouver Whitecaps FC Girls Elite BC Soccer REX
13	FW	Tanya Boychuk	20 June 2000 (aged 17)	(Canadian Soccer Association) Vancouver Whitecaps FC Girls Elite BC Soccer REX
15	FW	Jessica Lisi	11 February 1998 (aged 19)	(United States Soccer Federation) University of Memphis
20	FW	Jessica De Filippo	20 April 2001 (aged 16)	(Canadian Soccer Association) Quebec REX

== Group B ==
=== United States ===
Coach: (Czech Republic) Jitka Klimková

No.	Pos.	Player	Date of birth (age)	Caps	Goals	Club
1	GK	Laurel Ivory	29 August 1999 (aged 18)	5	0	(United States Soccer Federation) Virginia
12	GK	Amanda McGlynn	2 November 1998 (aged 19)	2	0	(United States Soccer Federation) Virginia Tech
19	DF	Tierna Davidson	19 September 1998 (aged 19)	6	0	(United States Soccer Federation) Stanford
4	DF	Naomi Girma	14 June 2000 (aged 17)	6	0	(United States Soccer Federation) California Thorns FC
13	DF	Tara McKeown	2 July 1999 (aged 18)	11	0	(United States Soccer Federation) USC
6	DF	Zoe Morse (c)	1 April 1998 (aged 19)	9	0	(United States Soccer Federation) Virginia
17	DF	Kiara Pickett	30 April 1999 (aged 18)	2	0	(United States Soccer Federation) Stanford
5	DF	Isabel Rodriguez	13 April 1999 (aged 18)	8	0	(United States Soccer Federation) Ohio State
14	DF	Karina Rodriguez	2 March 1999 (aged 18)	3	0	(United States Soccer Federation) UCLA
10	MF	Samantha Coffey	31 December 1998 (aged 19)	7	1	(United States Soccer Federation) Boston College
9	MF	Savannah DeMelo	26 March 1998 (aged 19)	23	4	(United States Soccer Federation) USC
18	MF	Jaelin Howell	21 November 1999 (aged 18)	12	0	(United States Soccer Federation) Real Colorado
8	MF	Brianna Pinto	24 May 2000 (aged 17)	9	0	(United States Soccer Federation) NTH Tophat
15	MF	Viviana Villacorta	2 February 1999 (aged 18)	10	1	(United States Soccer Federation) UCLA
2	FW	Ashley Sanchez	16 March 1999 (aged 18)	20	6	(United States Soccer Federation) UCLA
11	FW	Abigail Kim	19 July 1998 (aged 19)	11	3	(United States Soccer Federation) California
20	FW	Civana Kuhlmann	14 April 1999 (aged 18)	12	8	(United States Soccer Federation) Stanford
3	FW	Sophia Smith	10 August 2000 (aged 17)	11	8	(United States Soccer Federation) Real Colorado
7	FW	Taryn Torres	23 April 1999 (aged 18)	3	1	(United States Soccer Federation) Virginia
16	FW	Kelsey Turnbow	10 January 1999 (aged 19)	8	2	(United States Soccer Federation) Santa Clara

=== Nicaragua ===
Coach: Elna Dixon

No.	Pos.	Player	Date of birth (age)	Club
1	GK	Alicia Norori	30 September 1998 (aged 19)	(Nicaraguan Football Federation) Leyendas Fútbol Club
2	DF	Sheyla Flores (captain)	15 May 1998 (aged 19)	(Nicaraguan Football Federation) Aguilas de León
3	DF	Diana Ortega	27 December 1999 (aged 18)	(Nicaraguan Football Federation) Diriangén
4	MF	Alys Cruz	24 February 1998 (aged 19)	(Nicaraguan Football Federation) UNAN Managua
5	DF	Kesly Pérez	9 May 2000 (aged 17)	(Nicaraguan Football Federation) Leyendas Fútbol Club
6	DF	Gloria Bermúdez	1 June 2000 (aged 17)	(Nicaraguan Football Federation) Leyendas Fútbol Club
7	MF	Katherine Pereira	22 May 1999 (aged 18)	(Nicaraguan Football Federation) Leyendas Fútbol Club
8	FW	Hormyne Paiz	22 July 1999 (aged 18)	(Nicaraguan Football Federation) UNAN Managua
9	FW	Shanelly Treminio	17 October 1999 (aged 18)	(Nicaraguan Football Federation) Real Estelí
10	FW	Liz Vega	19 November 1998 (aged 19)	(United States Soccer Federation) Rhodes Lynx
11	FW	Yessenia Flores	7 July 1999 (aged 18)	(Nicaraguan Football Federation) Diriangén
12	GK	Yahara Salmerón	7 March 2000 (aged 17)	(Nicaraguan Football Federation) Diriangén
13	FW	Yorcelly Humphreys	3 September 2001 (aged 16)	(Nicaraguan Football Federation) Leyendas Fútbol Club
14	MF	Ariadna Meza	25 August 1998 (aged 19)	(Nicaraguan Football Federation) Aguilas de León
15	FW	Alma Gutiérrez	12 December 2001 (aged 16)	(Nicaraguan Football Federation) Real Estelí
16	MF	Jaclyn Gilday	12 November 2000 (aged 17)	(United States Soccer Federation) United Soccer Alliance
17	MF	Natalie Orellana	4 February 2001 (aged 16)	Unattached
18	FW	Lisbeth Moreno	6 August 2000 (aged 17)	(Nicaraguan Football Federation) Somotillo F.C
19	MF	Edy Pérez	5 December 2002 (aged 15)	(Nicaraguan Football Federation) Leyendas Fútbol Club
20	GK	Beykel Méndez	16 November 2000 (aged 17)	Unattached

=== Mexico ===
Coach: (Mexico) Christopher Cuéllar

No.	Pos.	Player	Date of birth (age)	Club
12	GK	Miriam Aguirre	29 January 1999 (aged 18)	(Mexican Football Federation) Pachuca
1	GK	Emily Alvarado (c)	9 June 1998 (aged 19)	(United States Soccer Federation) Texas Christian University
15	DF	Samara Alcalá	27 February 1998 (aged 19)	(Mexican Football Federation) Atlas
3	DF	Miriam García	14 February 1998 (aged 19)	(Mexican Football Federation) Guadalajara
5	DF	Jimena López	30 January 1999 (aged 18)	(United States Soccer Federation) Texas A&M University
4	DF	Kimberly Rodríguez	26 March 1999 (aged 18)	(United States Soccer Federation) Oklahoma State University
2	DF	Ashley Soto	30 December 1999 (aged 18)	(United States Soccer Federation) SoCal Blues
13	DF	Mia Villegas	31 May 2000 (aged 17)	(United States Soccer Federation) Davis Legacy
7	MF	Dayana Cázares	30 December 1999 (aged 18)	(Mexican Football Federation) América
17	MF	Belén Cruz	7 November 1998 (aged 19)	(Mexican Football Federation) UANL
8	MF	Alexia Delgado	9 December 1999 (aged 18)	(Mexican Football Federation) América
6	MF	Andrea Hernández	20 January 1998 (aged 19)	(Mexican Football Federation) Toluca
20	MF	Montserrat Hernández	26 June 1999 (aged 18)	(Mexican Football Federation) América
11	MF	Lizbeth Ovalle	19 October 1999 (aged 18)	(Mexican Football Federation) UANL
16	MF	Maricarmen Reyes	23 April 2000 (aged 17)	(United States Soccer Federation) West Coast FC
14	MF	Natalia Villareal	19 March 1998 (aged 19)	(Mexican Football Federation) UANL
18	FW	Norma Duarte Palafox	14 October 1998 (aged 19)	(Mexican Football Federation) Guadalajara
9	FW	Daniela Espinosa	13 July 1999 (aged 18)	(Mexican Football Federation) América
19	FW	Gabriela Juárez	13 April 2000 (aged 17)	(United States Soccer Federation) Slammers FC
10	FW	Katty Martínez	14 March 1998 (aged 19)	(Mexican Football Federation) UANL

=== Jamaica ===
Coach: (Jamaica) Lorne Donaldson

No.	Pos.	Player	Date of birth (age)	Caps	Goals	Club
1	GK	Sydney Schneider (c)	31 August 1999 (aged 18)			(United States Soccer Federation) Match Fit Academy
2	DF	Madiya Harriott	16 February 1999 (aged 18)			(United States Soccer Federation) Vanderbilt Commodores
3	DF	Chyanne Dennis	9 April 1999 (aged 18)			(United States Soccer Federation) South Florida Bulls
4	DF	Nevillegail Able	15 February 2002 (aged 15)			(Jamaica Football Federation) Waterhouse F.C.
5	FW	Kevena Reid	18 September 1998 (aged 19)			(Jamaica Football Federation) GC Foster College
6	MF	Gabrielle Gayle	14 October 2000 (aged 17)			Unattached
7	FW	Marlee Fray	2 November 2000 (aged 17)			(United States Soccer Federation) Sunrise Soccer Club
8	DF	Jayda Hylton-Pelaia	30 May 1998 (aged 19)			(United States Soccer Federation) East Carolina Pirates
9	FW	Olufolasade Adamolekun	21 February 2001 (aged 16)			(United States Soccer Federation) United Soccer Alliance
10	FW	Jody Brown	16 April 2002 (aged 15)			(Jamaica Football Federation) St. Ann Women’s FC
11	MF	Giselle Washington	3 April 2001 (aged 16)			(United States Soccer Federation) Concorde Fire
12	DF	Erin Mikalsen	21 June 1999 (aged 18)			(United States Soccer Federation) East Carolina Pirates
13	GK	Yazmeen Jamieson	17 March 1998 (aged 19)			(Canadian Soccer Association) Carleton Ravens
14	FW	Mireya Grey	7 September 1998 (aged 19)			(United States Soccer Federation) Washington Huskies
15	DF	Jadyn Matthews	16 November 1999 (aged 18)			(United States Soccer Federation) Orlando SC
16	MF	Ebony Clarke	26 May 2000 (aged 17)			(Canadian Soccer Association) Richmond Girls Soccer
17	FW	Jazmin Grant	20 April 1999 (aged 18)			(United States Soccer Federation) Houston Cougars
18	DF	Emily Caza				(United States Soccer Federation) Seton Hall Pirates
19	MF	Alyssa Julien	23 May 1999 (aged 18)			(United States Soccer Federation) Eastern Kentucky Colonels
20	FW	Shayla Smart	30 May 2000 (aged 17)			(United States Soccer Federation) Montverde Academy
