= 2018 CONCACAF Women's U-20 Championship qualification =

The 2018 CONCACAF Women's U-20 Championship qualification is a women's under-20 football competition which decides the participating teams of the 2018 CONCACAF Women's U-20 Championship. A total of eight teams will play in the final tournament. Players born on or after 1 January 1998 are eligible to compete in the tournament.

== Teams ==
A total of 23 (out of 41) CONCACAF member national teams entered, with four automatic qualifiers, and the remaining 19 teams entering regional qualification tournaments.

Zone	Berths	Automatic qualifiers	Teams entering qualification
North American Zone (NAFU)	3	**Canada**; **Mexico**; **United States**	
Central American Zone (UNCAF)	2		Belize; **Costa Rica**; El Salvador; Honduras; **Nicaragua**; Panama
Caribbean Zone (CFU)	3	**Trinidad and Tobago** (hosts)	Anguilla; Antigua and Barbuda; Bermuda; Bonaire; Cuba; Curaçao; Dominica; Dominican Republic; **Haiti**; **Jamaica**; Puerto Rico; Saint Kitts and Nevis; Saint Lucia

Notes

- Teams in **bold** qualified for the final tournament.

Did not enter
North American Zone (NAFU)	None
Central American Zone (UNCAF)	Guatemala (suspended)
Caribbean Zone (CFU)	Aruba; Bahamas; Barbados; British Virgin Islands; Cayman Islands; French Guiana; Grenada; Guadeloupe; Guyana; Martinique; Montserrat; Saint Martin; Saint Vincent and the Grenadines; Sint Maarten; Suriname; Turks and Caicos Islands; U.S. Virgin Islands

== Central American zone ==
2018 CONCACAF Women's U-20 Championship qualification (Central American Zone)
CONCACAF Clasificatoria Centroamericana Femenina Sub-20 2017

Tournament details
- Host country: Nicaragua
- City: Estelí
- Dates: 18–24 June 2017
- Teams: 6 (from 1 sub-confederation)

Tournament statistics
- Matches played: 8
- Goals scored: 35 (4.38 per match)
- Top scorer: (Costa Rica) Fabiola Villalobos (7 goals)

In the Central American Zone, six UNCAF member national teams entered the qualifying competition, hosted by Nicaragua. In the group stage, the six teams were divided into two groups of three teams. The top two teams of each group advance to the classification stage, where the winners of one group play the runners-up of the other group, with the two winners qualifying for the final tournament as the UNCAF representatives.

The schedule of the qualifying competition was announced on 17 May 2017. All times local, UTC−6.

=== Group stage ===
==== Group A ====
Pos	Team	Pld	W	D	L	GF	GA	GD	Pts	Qualification
1	Costa Rica	2	2	0	0	11	0	+11	6	Classification stage
2	Nicaragua (H)	2	1	0	1	5	2	+3	3	Classification stage
3	Belize	2	0	0	2	1	15	−14	0	

Source: CONCACAF
(H) Hosts
18 June 2017
19:30

Nicaragua	5–1	Belize
Cruz 23'; S. Flores 29'; Y. Flores 41'; Vega 63'; Treminio 70'		Brown 88'

Estadio Independencia, Estelí
Referee: Tatiana Montes (Panama)

20 June 2017
19:30

Belize	0–10	Costa Rica
		Elizondo 25' (pen.); G. Villalobos 35'; F. Villalobos 38', 41', 51', 65', 67'; Campos 53' (pen.); Salas 60'; D. Coto 79' (pen.)

Estadio Independencia, Estelí
Referee: Karitza Guerra (Honduras)

22 June 2017
19:30

Nicaragua	0–1	Costa Rica
		M. Coto 90+3'

Estadio Independencia, Estelí
Referee: Sandra Benítez (El Salvador)

==== Group B ====
Pos	Team	Pld	W	D	L	GF	GA	GD	Pts	Qualification
1	El Salvador	2	2	0	0	5	1	+4	6	Classification stage
2	Honduras	2	1	0	1	3	4	−1	3	Classification stage
3	Panama	2	0	0	2	0	3	−3	0	

Source: CONCACAF
18 June 2017
16:00

Panama	0–2	Honduras
		Romero 24'; Haylock 53'

Estadio Independencia, Estelí
Referee: Astrid Gramajo (Guatemala)

20 June 2017
16:00

Honduras	1–4	El Salvador
Romero 11'		González 21', 26'; Segovia 43'; Rodríguez 59'

Estadio Independencia, Estelí
Referee: Odette Hamilton (Jamaica)

22 June 2017
16:00

El Salvador	1–0	Panama
Segovia 9'

Estadio Independencia, Estelí
Referee: Christina Unkel (United States)

=== Classification stage ===
Winners qualify for 2018 CONCACAF Women's U-20 Championship.

24 June 2017
16:00

Costa Rica	7–0	Honduras
F. Villalobos 3', 65'; Chinchilla 50'; Campos 63'; D. Coto 75', 89'; González 90+2'

Estadio Independencia, Estelí
Referee: Sandra Benítez (El Salvador)

24 June 2017
20:00

El Salvador	1–2 (a.e.t.)	Nicaragua
Cerén 55'		Y. Flores 67'; Cruz 111'

Estadio Independencia, Estelí
Referee: Astrid Gramajo (Guatemala)

=== Goalscorers ===
7 goals

- (Costa Rica) Fabiola Villalobos

3 goals

- (Costa Rica) Daniela Coto

2 goals

- (Costa Rica) Mariela Campos
- (El Salvador) Amaya González
- (El Salvador) Maggi Segovia
- (Honduras) Fátima Romero
- (Nicaragua) Alys Cruz
- (Nicaragua) Yessenia Flores

1 goal

- (Belize) Jada Brown
- (Costa Rica) Priscila Chinchilla
- (Costa Rica) María Paula Coto
- (Costa Rica) María Paula Elizondo
- (Costa Rica) Indira González
- (Costa Rica) María Paula Salas
- (Costa Rica) Gloriana Villalobos
- (El Salvador) Brenda Cerén
- (El Salvador) Mara Rodríguez
- (Honduras) Kendra Haylock
- (Nicaragua) Sheyla Flores
- (Nicaragua) Shanelly Treminio
- (Nicaragua) Liz Vega

== Caribbean zone ==
2018 CONCACAF Women's U-20 Championship qualification (Caribbean Zone)
CONCACAF Caribbean Women's Under-20 Qualifier 2017

Tournament details
- Host countries: Haiti (group A); Bermuda (group B); Dominican Republic (group C); Saint Kitts and Nevis (final round)
- Dates: First round: 19–23 July 2017; Final round: 22–26 November 2017
- Teams: 13 (from 1 sub-confederation)

Final positions
- Champions: Jamaica
- Runners-up: Haiti
- Third place: Dominican Republic
- Fourth place: Saint Kitts and Nevis

Tournament statistics
- Matches played: 21
- Goals scored: 134 (6.38 per match)
- Top scorer(s): Total: (Haiti) Nérilia Mondésir (14 goals); Final round: (Haiti) Nérilia Mondésir (7 goals)

In the Caribbean Zone, 13 CFU member national teams entered the qualifying competition, consisting of two stages. Apart from Saint Kitts and Nevis, which received a bye as hosts of the final round, the remaining 12 teams entered the first round, and were drawn into three groups of four teams. The winners of each group advance to the final round to join Saint Kitts and Nevis, where they are placed into one group, with the top two teams qualifying for the final tournament as the CFU representatives together with Trinidad and Tobago who qualified automatically as hosts.

The draw of the qualifying competition was held on 5 June 2017, 10:00 UTC−4, at the CONCACAF headquarters in Miami Beach, Florida. Haiti, Bermuda, and Dominican Republic were automatically seeded in Groups A–C respectively as hosts of each first round group, while the remaining nine teams were seeded based on the results of the previous two editions of the qualifying competition.

Pot 1 (Hosts)	Haiti (Position A1); Bermuda (Position B1); Dominican Republic (Position C1)
Pot 2	Jamaica; Cuba; Puerto Rico
Pot 3	Anguilla; Curaçao; Antigua and Barbuda
Pot 4	Dominica; Bonaire; Saint Lucia

All times local, UTC−4, except Group B which is UTC−3.

=== First round ===
==== Group A ====
Pos	Team	Pld	W	D	L	GF	GA	GD	Pts	Qualification
1	Haiti (H)	3	3	0	0	26	1	+25	9	Final round
2	Cuba	3	2	0	1	21	3	+18	6	
3	Dominica	3	0	1	2	1	18	−17	1	
4	Anguilla	3	0	1	2	1	27	−26	1	

Source: CONCACAF
(H) Hosts
19 July 2017
17:00

Cuba	10–0	Dominica
Pérez (?); Mengana (?); Sablón (?); Corcho (?); Aguilar (?)

Stade Sylvio Cator, Port-au-Prince
19 July 2017
19:30

Haiti	16–0	Anguilla
Mondésir 3', 32', 49'; Jeudy 7', 8', 26', 67', 81'; Nicolas 12', 72'; Macean 18'; Dumornay 57', 68', 89'; Éloissaint 23', 59'

Stade Sylvio Cator, Port-au-Prince

21 July 2017
17:00

Anguilla	0–10	Cuba
		Sarría (?); Mengana (?); Corcho (?); Núñez (?); (?); (?); (?)

Stade Sylvio Cator, Port-au-Prince
21 July 2017
19:30

Haiti	7–0	Dominica
Northe 12'; Mondésir 28' (pen.), 45+1'; Éloissaint 35'; Dumornay 37', 53'; Damour 61'

Stade Sylvio Cator, Port-au-Prince

23 July 2017
17:00

Anguilla	1–1	Dominica
Romney (?)		Morgan (?)

Stade Sylvio Cator, Port-au-Prince
23 July 2017
19:30

Haiti	3–1	Cuba
Mondésir 27', 56'; Jeudy 45'		Pérez 11'

Stade Sylvio Cator, Port-au-Prince

==== Group B ====
Pos	Team	Pld	W	D	L	GF	GA	GD	Pts	Qualification
1	Jamaica	2	2	0	0	12	1	+11	6	Final round
2	Bermuda (H)	2	1	0	1	6	3	+3	3	
3	Curaçao	2	0	0	2	1	15	−14	0	
4	Saint Lucia	0	0	0	0	0	0	0	0	Withdrew

Source: CONCACAF
(H) Hosts
19 July 2017
20:00

Bermuda	5–1	Curaçao
Darrell 56'; Lindo 69'; Christopher 81'; Samuels 85'; Gibbons 90+'		Snel 65'

Bermuda National Stadium, Hamilton

21 July 2017
20:00

Jamaica	10–0	Curaçao
Fray 24', 31', 53'; Washington 30'; Julien 41'; Johnson 45+1', 56'; Mikalsen 69'; Reid 85'; Clarke 90'

Bermuda National Stadium, Hamilton

23 July 2017
20:00

Bermuda	1–2	Jamaica
Darrell 58'		Clarke 3', 63'

Bermuda National Stadium, Hamilton

==== Group C ====
Pos	Team	Pld	W	D	L	GF	GA	GD	Pts	Qualification
1	Dominican Republic (H)	3	3	0	0	9	0	+9	9	Final round
2	Puerto Rico	3	2	0	1	17	1	+16	6	
3	Antigua and Barbuda	3	1	0	2	8	7	+1	3	
4	Bonaire	3	0	0	3	0	26	−26	0	

Source: CONCACAF
(H) Hosts
19 July 2017
13:30

Puerto Rico	11–0	Bonaire
García 1', 38'; Laureano 4' (?); Luna 22'; Font 40'; Dobles 46' (?); Kappes (?); Filipkowski (?)

Estadio Panamericano, San Cristóbal
19 July 2017
16:00

Dominican Republic	1–0	Antigua and Barbuda
Oviedo 71'

Estadio Panamericano, San Cristóbal

21 July 2017
13:30

Antigua and Barbuda	0–6	Puerto Rico
		Díaz 29', 43'; Kappes 40', 48' (pen.); Torres 60'; Colón 90'

Estadio Panamericano, San Cristóbal
21 July 2017
16:00

Dominican Republic	7–0	Bonaire
Balbuena 10', 49', 85'; Oviedo 47', 87'; Rosario 89'; (?)

Estadio Panamericano, San Cristóbal

23 July 2017
13:30

Antigua and Barbuda	8–0	Bonaire
Grant 3', 24', 45', 48', 58', 75'; James 9', 90'

Estadio Panamericano, San Cristóbal
23 July 2017
16:00

Dominican Republic	1–0	Puerto Rico
Oviedo 21'

Estadio Panamericano, San Cristóbal

=== Final round ===
Pos	Team	Pld	W	D	L	GF	GA	GD	Pts	Qualification
1	Jamaica	3	3	0	0	11	0	+11	9	2018 CONCACAF Women's U-20 Championship and 2018 Central American and Caribbean Games
2	Haiti	3	2	0	1	16	2	+14	6	2018 CONCACAF Women's U-20 Championship and 2018 Central American and Caribbean Games
3	Dominican Republic	3	1	0	2	5	5	0	3	
4	Saint Kitts and Nevis (H)	3	0	0	3	0	25	−25	0	

Source: CONCACAF
(H) Hosts
22 November 2017
17:00

Jamaica	1–0	Dominican Republic
Adamolekun 60'

Warner Park Sporting Complex, Basseterre
22 November 2017
19:30

Saint Kitts and Nevis	0–12	Haiti
		Mondésir 9', 16', 31', 42', 44', 54'; Dumornay 27', 45+1'; Jeudy 35'; Éloissaint 69', 74'; Étienne 90+1'

Warner Park Sporting Complex, Basseterre

24 November 2017
17:00

Haiti	0–1	Jamaica
		Able 28'

Warner Park Sporting Complex, Basseterre
24 November 2017
19:30

Saint Kitts and Nevis	0–4	Dominican Republic
		Sánchez 10'; Oviedo 69'; Rivas 75', 90+2'

Warner Park Sporting Complex, Basseterre

26 November 2017
17:00

Haiti	4–1	Dominican Republic
Mondésir 40'; Étienne 60', 81'; Dumornay 90+2'		Oviedo 45'

Warner Park Sporting Complex, Basseterre
26 November 2017
19:30

Saint Kitts and Nevis	0–9	Jamaica
		Smart 8', 83'; Brown 9', 79'; Fray 51', 73', 87'; Matthews 59'; Adamolekun 71' (pen.)

Warner Park Sporting Complex, Basseterre

== Qualified teams ==
The following eight teams qualified for the final tournament.

Team	Qualified as	Qualified on	Previous appearances in CONCACAF Women's U-20 Championship^{1}
Canada	Automatic qualifiers	N/A	6 (**2004**, 2006, **2008**, 2010, 2012, 2015)
Mexico	Automatic qualifiers	N/A	8 (2002, 2004, 2006, 2008, 2010, 2012, 2014, 2015)
United States	Automatic qualifiers	N/A	8 (2002, 2004, **2006**, 2008, **2010**, **2012**, **2014**, **2015**)
Trinidad and Tobago	Hosts	2017	7 (2002, 2004, 2006, 2008, 2010, 2014, 2015)
Costa Rica	Central American Zone top two	24 June 2017	5 (2002, 2004, 2008, 2010, 2014)
Nicaragua	Central American Zone top two	24 June 2017	1 (2008)
Jamaica	Caribbean Zone top two	24 November 2017	8 (2002, 2004, 2006, 2008, 2010, 2012, 2014, 2015)
Haiti	Caribbean Zone top two	26 November 2017	3 (2002, 2012, 2015)

^{1} Bold indicates champions for that year. Italic indicates hosts for that year.
