= Sam Coffey =

American soccer player (born 1998)

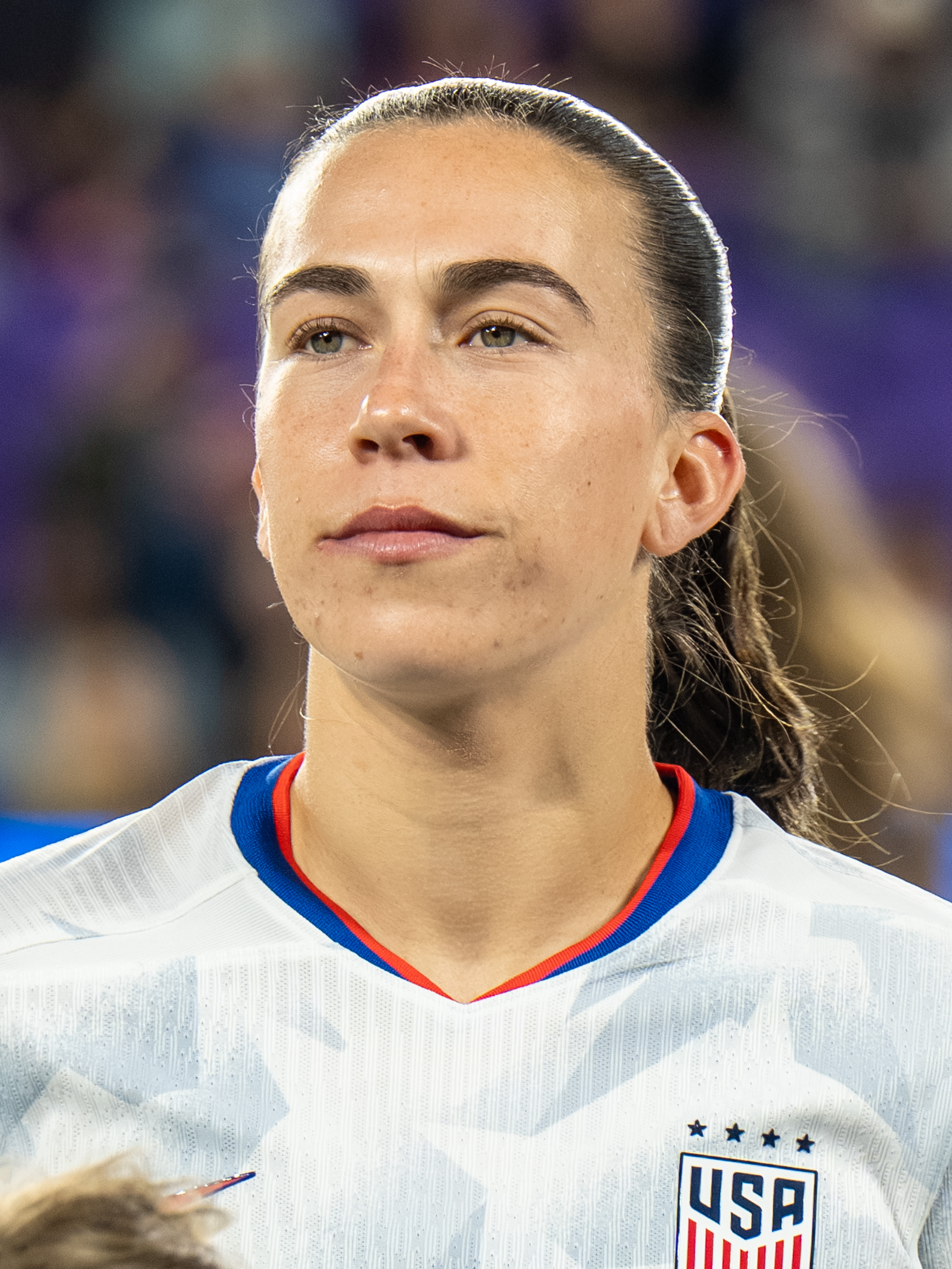
- Coffey with the United States in 2025

Personal information
- Full name: Samantha Grace Coffey
- Date of birth: December 31, 1998 (age 27)
- Place of birth: New York City, New York, U.S.
- Height: 5 ft 6 in (1.68 m)
- Position: Midfielder

Team information
- Current team: Manchester City
- Number: 17

Youth career
- Match-Fit Academy
- New York Soccer Club
- 2013–2017: Masters School Panthers

College career
Years	Team	Apps	(Gls)
2017–2018	Boston College Eagles	40	(17)
2019–2021	Penn State Nittany Lions	62	(25)

Senior career*
Years	Team	Apps	(Gls)
2022–2025	Portland Thorns	90	(5)
2026–	Manchester City	17	(0)

International career^{‡}
- United States U18
- United States U19
2017–2018	United States U20	13	(1)
2019	United States U23	3	(0)
2022–	United States	46	(5)
Medal record
Women's soccer
Representing the United States
Olympic Games
Gold medal – first place	2024 Paris	Team
CONCACAF W Championship
Winner	2022 Mexico
CONCACAF W Gold Cup
Winner	2024 United States
- * Club domestic league appearances and goals as of 22:10, November 22, 2026 (UTC) ‡ National team caps and goals as of April 17, 2026

Samantha Grace Coffey (born December 31, 1998) is an American professional soccer player who plays as a defensive midfielder for Women's Super League club Manchester City and the United States national team.

Coffey played college soccer for the Boston College Eagles and the Penn State Nittany Lions, earning All-American honors three times. She was drafted by the Portland Thorns in the first round of the 2021 NWSL Draft, winning the 2022 NWSL Championship in her rookie season and being named in the NWSL Best XI First Team three times.

Coffey made her senior debut for the United States in 2022. She won the gold medal with the national team at the 2024 Paris Olympics.

== Early life ==
Coffey played youth club soccer for Match-Fit Academy and New York Soccer Club, where she was a five-time "region 1 team" honoree and named an All-American. In high school, she played for the Masters School, located in Dobbs Ferry, where she was selected as team MVP all four years and was a team captain for two seasons. She was named the league player of the year three times, and scored 100 goals in high school.

== College career ==
=== Boston College Eagles ===
Coffey began her college soccer career with the Boston College Eagles in 2017. She led the team in assists and points as a freshman, and was selected to the All-ACC third team and freshman team. She was her team's co-rookie of the year, and was the Boston College Freshman Scholar Athlete of the Year. As a sophomore in 2018, she helped the team reach the first round of the 2018 NCAA Division I Women's Soccer Tournament, their first appearance since 2015. She was the team leader in both goals and assists, and was a semi-finalist for the Hermann Trophy. She was a United Soccer Coaches first-team All-American, was included in the All-ACC first team, and was selected as the ACC midfielder of the year. In both years she was also included in the All-ACC Academic Team. During her two seasons at the school, she started all 40 games, scoring 17 goals and recording 24 assists.

=== Penn State Nittany Lions ===
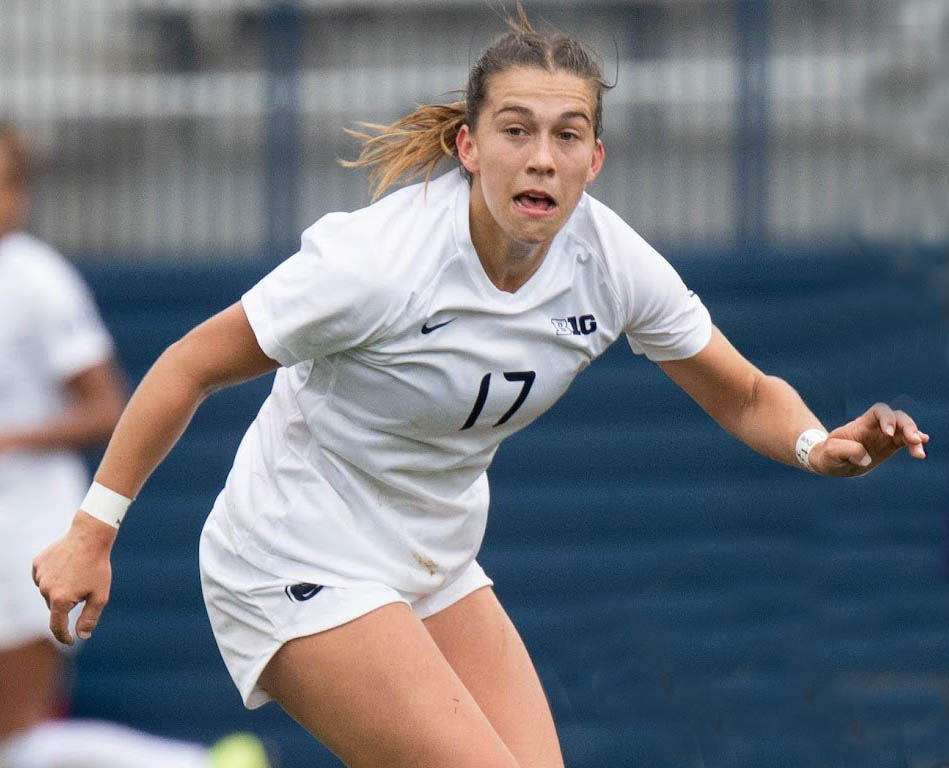
Coffey playing for Penn State in 2019

In December 2018, it was announced that Coffey would transfer to Pennsylvania State University to play for the Nittany Lions starting in the 2019 season. She enrolled in classes at the school in January 2019. In her junior season in 2019, she scored 11 goals and recorded 10 assists, ranking second in the Big Ten Conference with her 32 points. She helped the team to win the 2019 Big Ten Women's Soccer Tournament, in which she scored an equalizing penalty goal in the final against Michigan to send the game to extra time. The team advanced to the round of 16 of the 2019 NCAA Division I Women's Soccer Tournament before losing 2–0 to eventual champions Stanford. During her senior 2020–21 season, which was postponed to spring semester due to the COVID-19 pandemic, Coffey scored 6 goals and recorded 12 assists in 16 matches for the team as a captain. Penn State were eliminated in the round of 16 of the 2020 NCAA Division I Women's Soccer Tournament, losing to eventual runner-up Florida State. As the NCAA granted all student-athletes another year of eligibility due to the pandemic, Coffey played her fifth college season in 2021 as a graduate student. She recorded 8 goals and 8 assists in 21 games, with the team losing in the round of 16 of the 2021 NCAA Division I Women's Soccer Tournament to South Carolina.

In all three seasons, Coffey was included in the All-Big Ten and All-North Region first teams. She was included in the United Soccer Coaches Scholar All-America Second Team in 2019, and the CoSIDA Academic All-America First-Team in 2020–21. She was selected as the Big Ten Midfielder of the Year in 2020–21, and in the same season was included in the Senior CLASS Award First Team All-America. In 2019 and 2020, she was also included in the CoSIDA Academic All-District first team. Coffey made 62 appearances during her three seasons at Penn State, scoring 25 goals and recording 30 assists. She finished her collegiate career with 42 goals and 54 assists in 102 appearances, becoming the 50th player in NCAA Division I to tally 40 goals and 40 assists.

== Club career ==
=== Portland Thorns ===
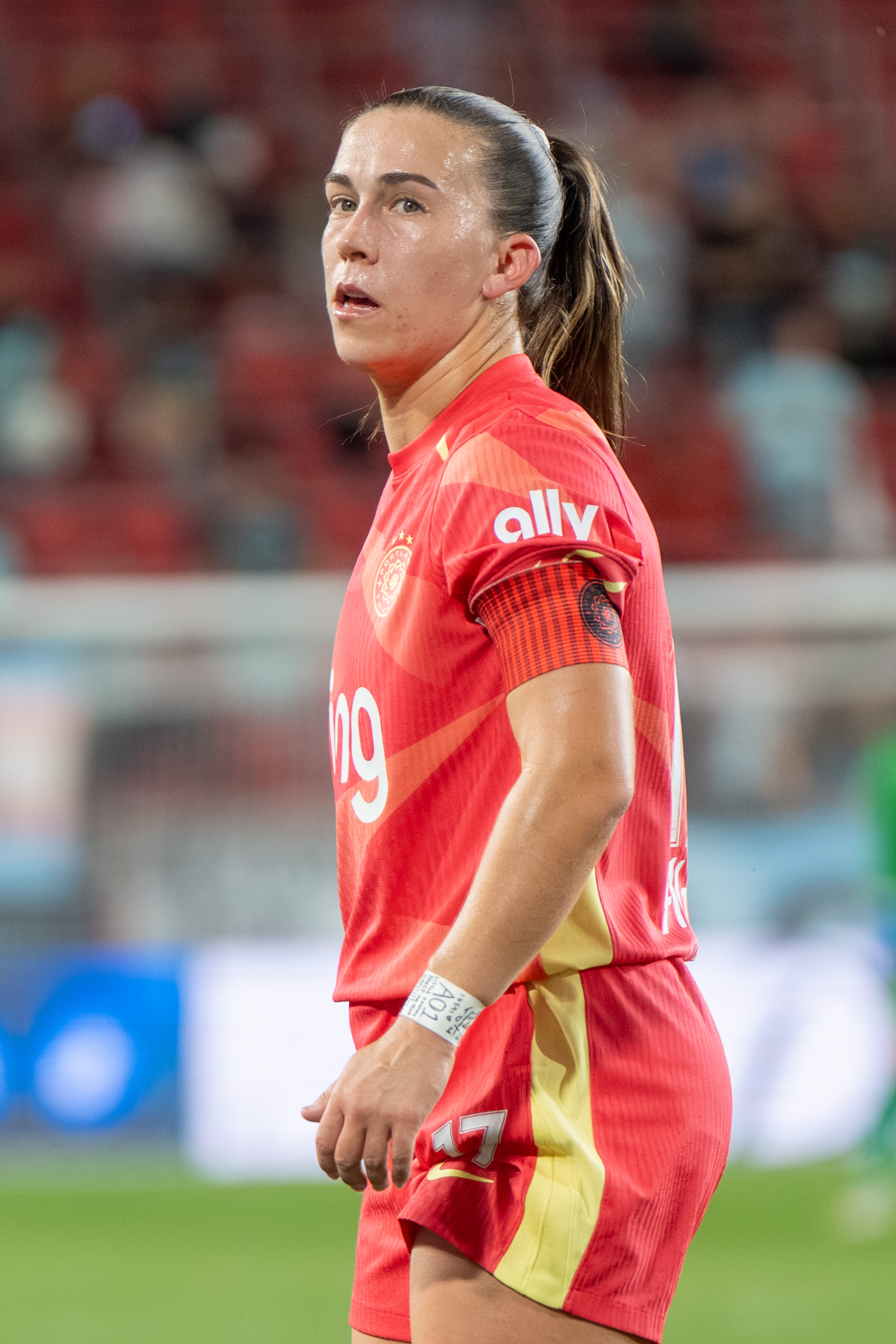
Coffey with Portland in 2025

After the NCAA granted all student-athletes another year of eligibility due to the effects of the COVID-19 pandemic, Coffey decided not to enter herself into the 2021 NWSL Draft as she was uncertain about her future. Nevertheless, she was still entered into the draft, and was selected by the Portland Thorns, with the 12th overall pick in the second round. However, she ultimately decided to play an additional year of college soccer with Penn State.

On January 7, 2022, the Portland Thorns signed Coffey to a two-year contract. She made her debut for the team in the 2022 NWSL Challenge Cup on March 18, 2022, playing the full match in a 1–1 away draw against OL Reign. She made her NWSL regular season debut on April 30, 2022, playing the full match in a 3–0 home win over the Kansas City Current. She quickly became a regular starter, starting in 26 games in 2022 (20 regular season, 4 Challenge Cup, and 2 playoff). She helped the Thorns win the NWSL Championship that year, was nominated for NWSL Rookie of the Year, and was on the 2022 NWSL Best XI First Team.

Coffey was named Portland's captain in the 2025 season. In June 2025, it was revealed that in March 2024, Coffey had signed a contract extension through the 2027 season.

=== Manchester City ===
In January 2026, Coffey entered into talks with English club Manchester City regarding a transfer. On January 14, it was officially announced that Manchester City had signed Coffey on a three-and-a-half-year deal, through summer 2029, with the BBC reporting a £600,000 fee spent by City, a club record.

== International career ==
=== Youth ===
Coffey was a member of the United States youth squads on the under-18, under-19, and under-20 levels. With the under-18 team, she attended six training camps and played in two international tournaments. At the under-20 level, she was included in the U.S. squad for the 2018 CONCACAF Women's U-20 Championship, held in Trinidad and Tobago. The team finished as runners-up after losing the final on penalties to Mexico. However, the team still qualified for the 2018 FIFA U-20 Women's World Cup in France, though Coffey was not selected as a squad member.

=== Senior ===
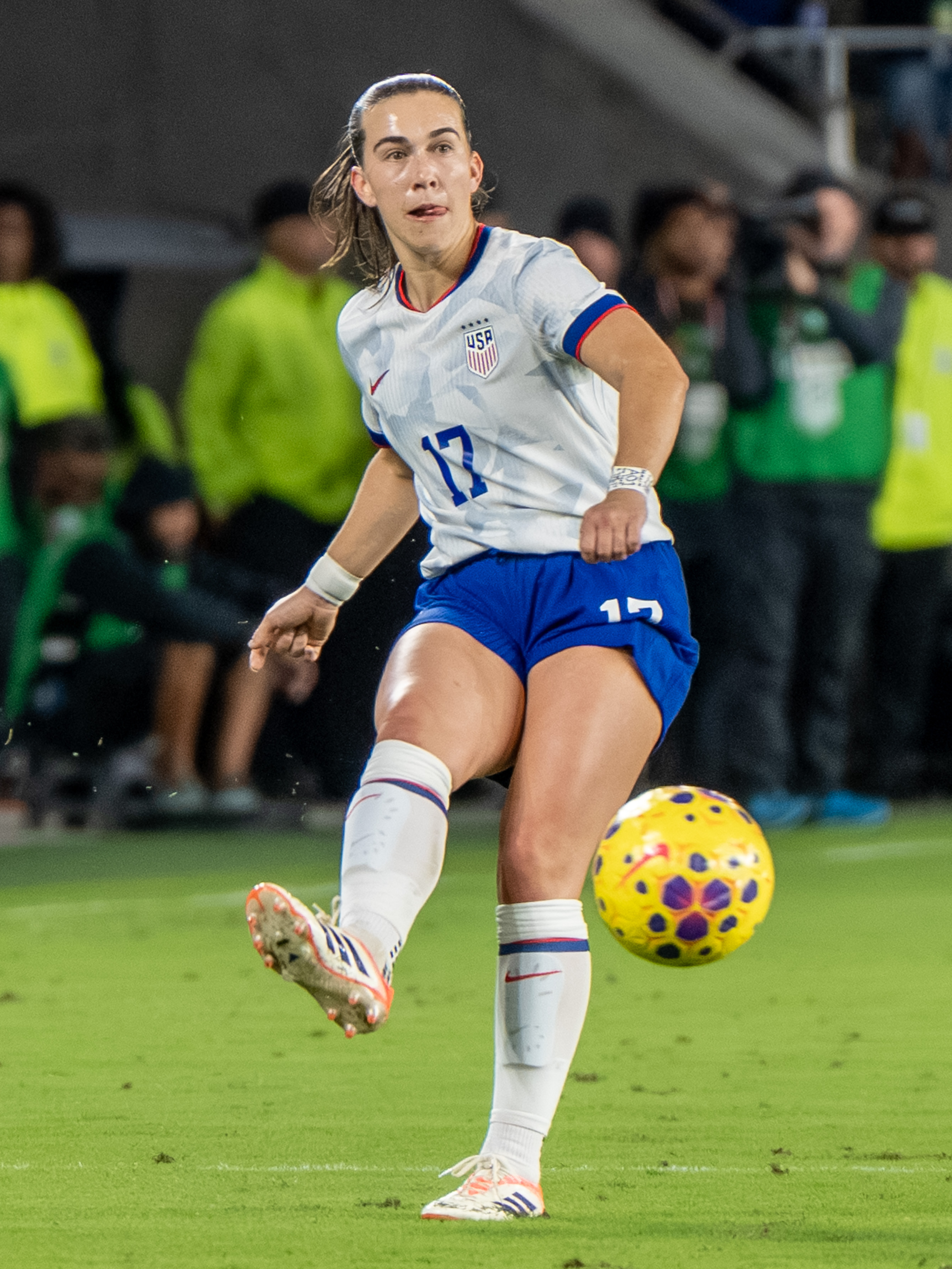
Coffey with the United States in 2025

In June 2022, Coffey earned her first call-up to the United States women's national team for two friendlies against Colombia. Despite being uncapped, Coffey was later added as an injury replacement for Ashley Hatch after the group stage of the 2022 CONCACAF W Championship, but was not called on to play. She earned her first cap, and first start, in a friendly against Nigeria on Sept. 6, 2022, and played three further matches that year. She was called up again for friendly matches in September 2023 but did not play. She scored her first international goal in a friendly against China PR on December 5, 2023. She scored a second international goal, again against China, on May 31, 2025.

Coffey was selected to the 18-player roster for the 2024 Summer Olympics in France. She started and played the full game in five of the six games the US played in, missing one because of yellow card accumulation. Her play included the gold medal game against Brazil, which the United States won 1–0 on a goal from Mallory Swanson.

== Personal life ==
Coffey was born in New York City to Wayne Coffey, a sportswriter who previously worked for the New York Daily News, and Denise Willi. She grew up in Sleepy Hollow, New York, and attended the Masters School. She earned her bachelor's degree in journalism from Pennsylvania State University at the end of 2020, and began pursuing her graduate degree at the school afterwards. Her sister Alex is a sportswriter who previously wrote for The Athletic and currently covers the Philadelphia Phillies as beat reporter for The Philadelphia Inquirer.

== Career statistics ==
=== Club ===
As of match played November 22, 2026

Appearances and goals by club, season and competition
Club	Season	League			National cup (Note: Includes the Women's FA Cup)		League cup (Note: Includes the NWSL Challenge Cup, Women's League Cup)		Continental		Other		Total	
Club	Season	Division	Apps	Goals	Apps	Goals	Apps	Goals	Apps	Goals	Apps	Goals	Apps	Goals
Portland Thorns	2022	NWSL	19	1	—		4	0	—		2 (Note: Appearance(s) in NWSL Playoffs)	0	25	1
Portland Thorns	2023	NWSL	22	0	—		4	0	—		1	0	27	0
Portland Thorns	2024	NWSL	24	2	—		—		3 (Note: Appearance(s) in CONCACAF W Champions Cup)	0	1	0	28	2
Portland Thorns	2025	NWSL	25	2	—		—		2	0	2	0	29	2
Portland Thorns	Total		90	5	0	0	8	0	5	0	6	0	109	5
Manchester City	2025–26	WSL	8	0	2	0	0	0	—		—		10	0
Manchester City	2026–27	WSL	9	0	0	0	—		3 (Note: Appearance(s) in UEFA Women's Champions League)	0	—		12	0
Manchester City	Total		17	0	2	0	0	0	3	0	0	0	22	0
Career total			107	5	2	0	8	0	8	0	6	0	131	5

=== International ===
As of match played April 17, 2026

National team	Year	Apps	Goals
United States	2022	4	0
United States	2023	3	1
United States	2024	21	0
United States	2025	14	4
United States	2026	4	0
Total		46	5

Scores and results list United States's goal tally first, score column indicates score after each Coffey goal.

List of international goals scored by Sam Coffey
No.	Date	Venue	Opponent	Score	Result	Competition	Ref.
1	December 5, 2023	Toyota Stadium, Frisco, Texas, United States	China	1–1	2–1	Friendly	
2	May 31, 2025	Allianz Field, St. Paul, Minnesota, United States	China	2–0	3–0	Friendly	
3	June 26, 2025	DSG Park, Commerce City, Colorado, United States	Republic of Ireland	2–0	4–0	Friendly	
4	July 2, 2025	Audi Field, Washington, D.C., United States	Canada	1–0	3–0	Friendly	
5	October 26, 2025	Pratt & Whitney Stadium, East Hartford, Connecticut, United States	Portugal	3–1	3–1	Friendly	

== Honors ==
Penn State Nittany Lions

- Big Ten Women's Soccer Tournament: 2019

Portland Thorns

- NWSL Championship: 2022

Manchester City

- Women's Super League: 2025–26

United States U20

- CONCACAF Women's U-20 Championship runner-up: 2018

United States

- Summer Olympic Games gold medal: 2024
- CONCACAF Women's Championship: 2022
- CONCACAF W Gold Cup: 2024
- SheBelieves Cup: 2024, 2026

Individual

- NWSL Best XI First Team: 2022, 2023 2025
- NWSL Best XI of the Month: June 2022, Sept./Oct. 2022, June 2023, August 2023, Sept./Oct. 2023, May 2024
- NWSL Rookie of the Month: June 2022
- First-team All-American: 2018
- Second-team All-American: 2019, 2021
- First-team All-Big Ten: 2019, 2020, 2021
- First-team All-ACC: 2018
- Third-team All-ACC: 2017
- Big Ten Midfielder of the Year: 2020
- ACC Midfielder of the Year: 2018

== See also ==
- List of Pennsylvania State University Olympians
