= 2018 CONCACAF Women's U-17 Championship qualification =

The 2018 CONCACAF Women's U-17 Championship qualification is a women's under-17 football competition which decides the participating teams of the 2018 CONCACAF Women's U-17 Championship. A total of eight teams will play in the final tournament. Players born on or after 1 January 2001 are eligible to compete in the tournament.

== Teams ==
A total of 27 (out of 41) CONCACAF member national teams entered, with four automatic qualifiers, and the remaining 23 teams entering regional qualification tournaments.

Zone	Berths	Automatic qualifiers	Teams entering qualification
North American Zone (NAFU)	3	**Canada**; **Mexico**; **United States**	
Central American Zone (UNCAF)	2	**Nicaragua** (hosts)	**Costa Rica**; El Salvador; Honduras; Panama
Caribbean Zone (CFU)	3		Anguilla; Antigua and Barbuda; Aruba; Bahamas; Barbados; **Bermuda**; Cuba; Curaçao; Dominican Republic; Grenada; Guyana; **Haiti**; Jamaica; **Puerto Rico**; Saint Kitts and Nevis; Saint Lucia; Saint Vincent and the Grenadines; Trinidad and Tobago; U.S. Virgin Islands

Notes

- Teams in **bold** qualified for the final tournament.

Did not enter
North American Zone (NAFU)	None
Central American Zone (UNCAF)	Belize; Guatemala (suspended)
Caribbean Zone (CFU)	Bonaire; British Virgin Islands; Cayman Islands; Dominica; French Guiana; Guadeloupe; Martinique; Montserrat; Saint Martin; Sint Maarten; Suriname; Turks and Caicos Islands

== Central American Zone ==
2018 CONCACAF Women's U-17 Championship qualification (Central American Zone)
CONCACAF Clasificatoria Centroamericana Femenina Sub-17 2017

Tournament details
- Host country: Panama
- City: Chitré
- Dates: 24–28 October 2017
- Teams: 4 (from 1 sub-confederation)

Final positions
- Champions: Costa Rica
- Runners-up: Panama
- Third place: El Salvador
- Fourth place: Honduras

Tournament statistics
- Matches played: 6
- Goals scored: 18 (3 per match)
- Top scorer(s): (Panama) Anuvis Angulo (5 goals)

In the Central American Zone, four UNCAF member national teams entered the qualifying competition, hosted by Panama. The four teams were placed into one group, with the winners qualifying for the final tournament as the UNCAF representatives together with Nicaragua who qualified automatically as hosts.

The schedule of the qualifying competition was announced on 26 September 2017. All times local, UTC−5.

=== Group stage ===
Pos	Team	Pld	W	D	L	GF	GA	GD	Pts	Qualification
1	Costa Rica	3	3	0	0	10	0	+10	9	2018 CONCACAF Women's U-17 Championship
2	Panama (H)	3	2	0	1	7	1	+6	6	
3	El Salvador	3	1	0	2	1	7	−6	3	
4	Honduras	3	0	0	3	0	10	−10	0	

Source: CONCACAF
(H) Hosts
24 October 2017
15:30

El Salvador	0–5	Costa Rica
		Chinchilla 7', 63'; Guerrero 21'; Salas 49' (pen.); Gutiérrez 67'

Estadio Los Milagros, Chitré
Referee: Tatiana Guzmán (Nicaragua)
24 October 2017
19:00

Panama	5–0	Honduras
Vargas 4'; Angulo 18', 61', 84'; Atencio 30'

Estadio Los Milagros, Chitré
Referee: Cibeles Miranda (El Salvador)

26 October 2017
15:30

Costa Rica	4–0	Honduras
Chinchilla 8'; Salas 25' (pen.); Contreras 29'; Guerrero 31'

Estadio Los Milagros, Chitré
Referee: Vilma Montes (El Salvador)
26 October 2017
19:00

Panama	2–0	El Salvador
Angulo 39', 67'

Estadio Los Milagros, Chitré
Referee: Cecile Hinds (Trinidad and Tobago)

28 October 2017
15:30

Honduras	0–1	El Salvador
		Calderón 78'

Estadio Los Milagros, Chitré
Referee: Glenda López (Guatemala)
28 October 2017
19:00

Panama	0–1	Costa Rica
		Salas 90+3' (pen.)

Estadio Los Milagros, Chitré
Referee: Tatiana Guzmán (Nicaragua)

=== Goalscorers ===
5 goals

- (Panama) Anuvis Angulo

3 goals

- (Costa Rica) Priscila Chinchilla
- (Costa Rica) María Paula Salas

2 goals

- (Costa Rica) Medolyn Guerrero

1 goal

- (Costa Rica) Daniela Contreras
- (Costa Rica) Pamela Gutiérrez
- (El Salvador) Lesly Calderón
- (Panama) Yasli Atencio
- (Panama) Rosario Vargas

== Caribbean Zone ==
2018 CONCACAF Women's U-17 Championship qualification (Caribbean Zone)
CONCACAF Caribbean Women's Under-17 Qualifier 2017

Tournament details
- Host countries: Trinidad and Tobago (Group A); Puerto Rico (Group B); Saint Lucia (Group C); Guyana (Group D); Saint Vincent and the Grenadines (Group E); Haiti (Final round)
- Dates: First round: 2–27 August 2017; Final round: 16–22 October 2017
- Teams: 19 (from 1 sub-confederation)

Final positions
- Champions: Haiti
- Runners-up: Bermuda
- Third place: Puerto Rico
- Fourth place: Jamaica

Tournament statistics
- Matches played: 32
- Goals scored: 174 (5.44 per match)
- Top scorer(s): Total: (Bermuda) LeiLanni Nesbeth (12 goals); Final round: (Haiti) Melchie Dumonay (Jamaica) Olufolasade Adamolekun (4 goals each)

In the Caribbean Zone, 19 CFU member national teams entered the qualifying competition, consisting of two stages. Apart from Haiti, which received a bye as hosts of the final round, the remaining 18 teams entered the first round, and were drawn into three groups of four teams and two groups of three teams. The winners of each group advance to the final round to join Haiti, where they are divided into two groups of three teams, with the top three teams (the two group winners which play in the final, and the winners of the third place match played between the two group runners-up) qualifying for the final tournament as the CFU representatives.

The draw of the qualifying competition was held on 6 June 2017, 10:00 UTC−4, at the CONCACAF headquarters in Miami Beach, Florida. Trinidad and Tobago, Puerto Rico, Saint Lucia, Guyana, and Saint Vincent and the Grenadines were automatically seeded in Groups A–E respectively as hosts of each first round group, while the remaining 14 teams were seeded based on the results of the previous two editions of the qualifying competition. Any of the top five-ranked teams (Haiti, Jamaica, Trinidad and Tobago, Puerto Rico, Bermuda) could not be drawn into the same group.

Hosts	Trinidad and Tobago (Position A1); Puerto Rico (Position B1); Saint Lucia (Position C1); Guyana (Position D1); Saint Vincent and the Grenadines (Position E1)
Pot 1	Jamaica; Bermuda; Cuba; Dominican Republic; Grenada
Pot 2	Antigua and Barbuda; Saint Kitts and Nevis; Barbados; U.S. Virgin Islands; Anguilla
Pot 3	Aruba; Bahamas; Curaçao

All times local, UTC−4.

=== First round ===
==== Group A ====
Pos	Team	Pld	W	D	L	GF	GA	GD	Pts	Qualification
1	Trinidad and Tobago (H)	3	2	1	0	22	2	+20	7	Final round
2	Grenada	3	2	1	0	17	4	+13	7	
3	Curaçao	3	1	0	2	4	13	−9	3	
4	U.S. Virgin Islands	3	0	0	3	0	24	−24	0	

Source: CONCACAF
(H) Hosts
23 August 2017
17:00

Grenada	6–2	Curaçao
Smith 8'; Charles 12', 56'; Fullerton 27'; Ramdhanny 41'; Rennie 82'		Hart 45' (pen.), 79'

Ato Boldon Stadium, Couva
23 August 2017
19:30

Trinidad and Tobago	13–0	U.S. Virgin Islands
Prince 11', 17', 28', 43'; Trotman 16', 35'; Mitchell 43'; Cornwall 49', 62', 78'; Hackshaw 52'; Serrant 70'; Daniel 77'

Ato Boldon Stadium, Couva

25 August 2017
17:00

U.S. Virgin Islands	0–9	Grenada
		Fullerton 15', 28', 52', 68', 82'; Charles 12', 18', 70'; McIntosh 79'

Ato Boldon Stadium, Couva
25 August 2017
19:30

Trinidad and Tobago	7–0	Curaçao
Trotman 4'; Prince 6', 11'; Mitchell 19'; Cornwall 20'; Baboolal 26'; Serrant 55'

Ato Boldon Stadium, Couva

27 August 2017
17:00

U.S. Virgin Islands	0–2	Curaçao
		Piar ?'; Hansen ?'

Ato Boldon Stadium, Couva
27 August 2017
19:30

Trinidad and Tobago	2–2	Grenada
Trotman 75'; Serrant 87'		Charles 45'; McIntosh 90+2' (pen.)

Ato Boldon Stadium, Couva

==== Group B ====
Pos	Team	Pld	W	D	L	GF	GA	GD	Pts	Qualification
1	Puerto Rico (H)	3	3	0	0	19	1	+18	9	Final round
2	Dominican Republic	3	2	0	1	11	3	+8	6	
3	Bahamas	3	0	1	2	3	18	−15	1	
4	Anguilla	3	0	1	2	1	12	−11	1	

Source: CONCACAF
(H) Hosts
23 August 2017
17:00

Anguilla	1–1	Bahamas
Johnson ?'		?'

Juan Ramón Loubriel Stadium, Bayamón
23 August 2017
19:30

Puerto Rico	2–0	Dominican Republic
Maldonado 37'; R. Pérez 57'

Juan Ramón Loubriel Stadium, Bayamón

25 August 2017
17:00

Dominican Republic	2–0	Anguilla
?'; ?'

Juan Ramón Loubriel Stadium, Bayamón
25 August 2017
19:30

Puerto Rico	8–1	Bahamas
L. Rivera 7', 56'; Laureano 16' (pen.); Maldonado 28'; Balser 36'; I. Rivera 49'; T. Pérez 68'; Jennings 83'		Simms 77'

Juan Ramón Loubriel Stadium, Bayamón

27 August 2017
15:30

Dominican Republic	9–1	Bahamas
?'; ?'; ?'; ?'; ?'; ?'; ?'; ?'; ?'		?'

Juan Ramón Loubriel Stadium, Bayamón
27 August 2017
18:00

Puerto Rico	9–0	Anguilla
Maldonado 3', 32', 39', 44'; Laureano 29'; Cacho 48', 77'; Colón 58' (pen.), 88'

Juan Ramón Loubriel Stadium, Bayamón

==== Group C ====
Pos	Team	Pld	W	D	L	GF	GA	GD	Pts	Qualification
1	Bermuda	3	3	0	0	21	1	+20	9	Final round
2	Saint Lucia (H)	3	1	1	1	6	4	+2	4	
3	Antigua and Barbuda	3	1	1	1	3	7	−4	4	
4	Aruba	3	0	0	3	2	20	−18	0	

Source: CONCACAF
(H) Hosts
22 August 2017
18:00

Antigua and Barbuda	2–1	Aruba
Wilson ?'; Lewis ?'		Doornkamp ?'

Daren Sammy Cricket Ground, Gros Islet
22 August 2017
20:00

Saint Lucia	0–3	Bermuda
		5' (o.g.); Nesbeth 7'; Masters 17'

Daren Sammy Cricket Ground, Gros Islet

24 August 2017
18:00

Bermuda	5–0	Antigua and Barbuda
Nesbeth ?', ?'; Christopher ?'; Masters ?', ?'

Daren Sammy Cricket Ground, Gros Islet
24 August 2017
20:00

Saint Lucia	5–0	Aruba
Lashley 40'; Shepard ?'; Weekes 82'; St. Prix 83'; St. Louis 84'

Daren Sammy Cricket Ground, Gros Islet

26 August 2017
18:00

Bermuda	13–1	Aruba
Nesbeth ?', ?', ?', ?', ?', ?'; Masters ?', ?', ?'; Mullen ?', ?'; Christopher ?'; Medeiros ?'		?'

Daren Sammy Cricket Ground, Gros Islet
26 August 2017
20:00

Saint Lucia	1–1	Antigua and Barbuda
Weekes 38'		Benjamin 70'

Daren Sammy Cricket Ground, Gros Islet

==== Group D ====
Pos	Team	Pld	W	D	L	GF	GA	GD	Pts	Qualification
1	Cuba	2	1	1	0	8	0	+8	4	Final round
2	Barbados	2	1	1	0	5	1	+4	4	
3	Guyana (H)	2	0	0	2	1	13	−12	0	

Source: CONCACAF
(H) Hosts
9 August 2017
17:00

Guyana	1–5	Barbados
Smith 12'		Padmore 16'; Smith 21' (o.g.); Briggs-Thompson 50', 71'; Sealy 51'

Synthetic Track and Field Facility, Leonora

11 August 2017
17:00

Barbados	0–0	Cuba

Synthetic Track and Field Facility, Leonora

13 August 2017
17:00

Guyana	0–8	Cuba
		Sarmiento 24', 45'; Domínguez 25'; Tamayo 62', 73', 77', 78'; Barrios 81'

Synthetic Track and Field Facility, Leonora

==== Group E ====
Pos	Team	Pld	W	D	L	GF	GA	GD	Pts	Qualification
1	Jamaica	2	2	0	0	17	0	+17	6	Final round
2	Saint Kitts and Nevis	2	1	0	1	3	11	−8	3	
3	Saint Vincent and the Grenadines (H)	2	0	0	2	1	10	−9	0	

Source: CONCACAF
(H) Hosts
2 August 2017
16:00

Saint Vincent and the Grenadines	1–3	Saint Kitts and Nevis
McKie 86'		Williams 25'; Jeffers 26', 50'

Arnos Vale Stadium, Kingstown

4 August 2017
16:00

Saint Kitts and Nevis	0–10	Jamaica
		Washington 5', 22'; Brown 7'; Perrier 37', 41'; Gray 54', 90+'; Salmon 76', 79'; Roberts 90'

Arnos Vale Stadium, Kingstown

6 August 2017
16:00

Saint Vincent and the Grenadines	0–7	Jamaica
		Gray 8', 53'; Roberts 21'; Clarke 44' (pen.); Brown 64' (pen.); Perrier 72'; Richards 88'

Arnos Vale Stadium, Kingstown

=== Final round ===
==== Group F ====
Pos	Team	Pld	W	D	L	GF	GA	GD	Pts	Qualification
1	Bermuda	2	1	1	0	5	4	+1	4	Final and 2018 CONCACAF Women's U-17 Championship
2	Jamaica	2	1	0	1	5	4	+1	3	Third place match
3	Trinidad and Tobago	2	0	1	1	3	5	−2	1	

Source: CONCACAF
16 October 2017
16:00

Trinidad and Tobago	2–2	Bermuda
De Gannes 61'; Prince 89'		Nesbeth 21', 69'

Stade Sylvio Cator, Port-au-Prince

18 October 2017
16:00

Bermuda	3–2	Jamaica
Nesbeth 10'; Christopher 15'; Gibbons 22'		Salmon 54'; Adamolekun 89'

Stade Sylvio Cator, Port-au-Prince

20 October 2017
16:00

Trinidad and Tobago	1–3	Jamaica
Prince 6'		Perrier 30'; Adamolekun 69', 85'

Stade Sylvio Cator, Port-au-Prince

==== Group G ====
Pos	Team	Pld	W	D	L	GF	GA	GD	Pts	Qualification
1	Haiti (H)	2	2	0	0	6	0	+6	6	Final and 2018 CONCACAF Women's U-17 Championship
2	Puerto Rico	2	1	0	1	4	3	+1	3	Third place match
3	Cuba	2	0	0	2	0	7	−7	0	

Source: CONCACAF
(H) Hosts
16 October 2017
19:00

Haiti	3–0	Puerto Rico
Caremus 16'; Dumonay 60'; Etienne 73'

Stade Sylvio Cator, Port-au-Prince

18 October 2017
19:00

Puerto Rico	4–0	Cuba
Cacho 15', 73'; Maldonado 60'; Cimino 82'

Stade Sylvio Cator, Port-au-Prince

20 October 2017
19:00

Haiti	3–0	Cuba
Dumonay ?', ?', ?'

Stade Sylvio Cator, Port-au-Prince

==== Third place match ====
Winner qualifies for 2018 CONCACAF Women's U-17 Championship.

22 October 2017
16:30

Jamaica	1–1	Puerto Rico
Adamolekun 77'		Cacho 75'
Penalties
Adamolekun (penalty scored); Forbes (penalty scored); Washington (penalty scored); Able (penalty missed); Scarlett (penalty missed)	6–7	(penalty missed) Varela; (penalty scored) Graves

Stade Sylvio Cator, Port-au-Prince

==== Final ====
22 October 2017
19:00

Bermuda	1–4	Haiti
Christopher 42'		Pierre 8'; Etienne 32'; Caremus 60'; Dumont 79'

Stade Sylvio Cator, Port-au-Prince

== Qualified teams ==
The following eight teams qualified for the final tournament.

Team	Qualified as	Qualified on	Previous appearances in CONCACAF Women's U-17 Championship^{1}
Canada	Automatic qualifiers	N/A	5 (2008, **2010**, 2012, 2013, 2016)
Mexico	Automatic qualifiers	N/A	5 (2008, 2010, 2012, **2013**, 2016)
United States	Automatic qualifiers	N/A	5 (**2008**, 2010, **2012**, 2013, **2016**)
Nicaragua	Hosts	2017	0 (debut)
Costa Rica	Central American Zone winners	28 October 2017	3 (2008, 2010, 2016)
Haiti	Caribbean Zone top three	20 October 2017	3 (2010, 2013, 2016)
Bermuda	Caribbean Zone top three	20 October 2017	0 (debut)
Puerto Rico	Caribbean Zone top three	22 October 2017	1 (2008)

^{1} Bold indicates champions for that year. Italic indicates hosts for that year.
