= Mariela Campos =

Mariela Campos may refer to:

- Mariela Campos (footballer, born 1991), Costa Rican footballer
- Mariela Campos (footballer, born 1998), Costa Rican footballer
