= Alyssa Oviedo =

Dominican footballer (born 2000)

Personal information
- Full name: Alyssa Jazmine Oviedo Reyes
- Date of birth: 18 August 2000 (age 26)
- Place of birth: Clifton, New Jersey, U.S.
- Height: 1.63 m (5 ft 4 in)
- Positions: Midfielder; forward

Youth career
- 2014–2018: DePaul Catholic High School

College career
| Years | Team | Apps | (Gls) |
| 2018–2023 | Vermont Catamounts | 73 | (13) |

Senior career*
| Years | Team | Apps | (Gls) |
| 2024–2026 | Puebla | 23 | (0) |

International career^{‡}
| 2017–2020 | Dominican Republic U-20 | 6 | (8) |
| 2018– | Dominican Republic | 12 | (10) |
- * Club domestic league appearances and goals as of 2 February 2026 ‡ National team caps and goals as of 2 August 2024

Alyssa Jazmine Oviedo Reyes (born 18 August 2000) is a footballer who plays as a midfielder for Liga MX Femenil club Puebla. Born in the United States, she plays for the Dominican Republic women's national team.

Raised in Clifton, New Jersey, Ovideo played prep soccer at DePaul Catholic High School.

== International career ==
Oviedo was born in the United States to a Peruvian father and a Dominican mother, and as such was eligible to represent either of these three nations.

She was the most outstanding player for the Dominican Republic at the 2018 CONCACAF Women's U-20 Championship qualification, scoring six goals. On 5 May 2018, she played officially at senior level, becoming cap-tied to the Dominican Republic.

=== International goals ===
Scores and results list Dominican Republic's goal tally first

| No. | Date | Venue | Opponent | Score | Result | Competition |
|---|---|---|---|---|---|---|
| 1 | 5 May 2018 | Estadio Panamericano, Dominican Republic, Dominican Republic | Cuba | 1–1 | 1–5 | 2018 CONCACAF Women's Championship qualification |
| 2 | 11 May 2018 | Estadio Panamericano, Dominican Republic, Dominican Republic | Anguilla | 1–0 | 3–0 | 2018 CONCACAF Women's Championship qualification |
| 3 | 11 May 2018 | Estadio Panamericano, Dominican Republic, Dominican Republic | Anguilla | 3–0 | 3–0 | 2018 CONCACAF Women's Championship qualification |
| 4 | 16 February 2022 | Estadio Olímpico Félix Sánchez, Santo Domingo, Dominican Republic | Grenada | 1–0 | 9–0 | 2022 CONCACAF W Championship qualification |
| 5 | 16 February 2022 | Estadio Olímpico Félix Sánchez, Santo Domingo, Dominican Republic | Grenada | 4–0 | 9–0 | 2022 CONCACAF W Championship qualification |
| 6 | 16 February 2022 | Estadio Olímpico Félix Sánchez, Santo Domingo, Dominican Republic | Grenada | 6–0 | 9–0 | 2022 CONCACAF W Championship qualification |
| 7 | 19 February 2022 | Truman Bodden Stadium, George Town, Cayman Islands | Cayman Islands | 2–0 | 4–0 | 2022 CONCACAF W Championship qualification |
| 8 | 1 December 2023 | Wildey Turf, Bridgetown, Barbados | Barbados | 4–1 | 7–1 | 2024 CONCACAF W Gold Cup qualification |
| 9 | 5 December 2023 | Estadio Olímpico Félix Sánchez, Santo Domingo, Dominican Republic | Bermuda | 1–0 | 2–0 | 2024 CONCACAF W Gold Cup qualification |
| 10 | 28 February 2026 | Estadio Cibao, Santiago de los Caballeros, Dominican Republic | Belize | 5–1 | 6–1 | 2026 CONCACAF W Championship qualification |
| 11 | 6 March 2026 | Raymond E. Guishard Technical Centre, The Valley, Anguilla | Anguilla | 2–0 | 8–0 | 2026 CONCACAF W Championship qualification |
| 12 | 6 March 2026 | Raymond E. Guishard Technical Centre, The Valley, Anguilla | Anguilla | 3–0 | 8–0 | 2026 CONCACAF W Championship qualification |
| 13 | 6 March 2026 | Raymond E. Guishard Technical Centre, The Valley, Anguilla | Anguilla | 4–0 | 8–0 | 2026 CONCACAF W Championship qualification |
