= Amaya González =

Salvadoran-American association footballer (born 2000)

Personal information
- Full name: Amaya González Solano
- Date of birth: 21 December 2000 (age 25)
- Place of birth: United States
- Height: 1.60 m (5 ft 3 in)
- Position: Midfielder

Team information
- Current team: Colorado Buffaloes
- Number: 25

Youth career
- Downey Vikings
- 2017–2018: LAFC Slammers
- 2018–2019: LA Galaxy

College career
Years	Team	Apps	(Gls)
2019–	Colorado Buffaloes	23	(0)

International career^{‡}
2021–	El Salvador	1	(0)
- ‡ National team caps and goals as of 8 April 2021

Amaya González Solano (born 21 December 2000) is a Salvadoran-American association footballer who plays as a midfielder for college team Colorado Buffaloes and the El Salvador national team.

== Early life ==
González was raised in Bellflower, California. She is of Salvadoran descent.

== High school and college career ==
González has attended the Downey High School in Downey, California and the University of Colorado in Boulder, Colorado.

== International career ==
González made her senior debut for El Salvador on 8 April 2021.

== See also ==
- List of El Salvador women's international footballers
