= Olufolasade Adamolekun =

Jamaican footballer (born 2001)

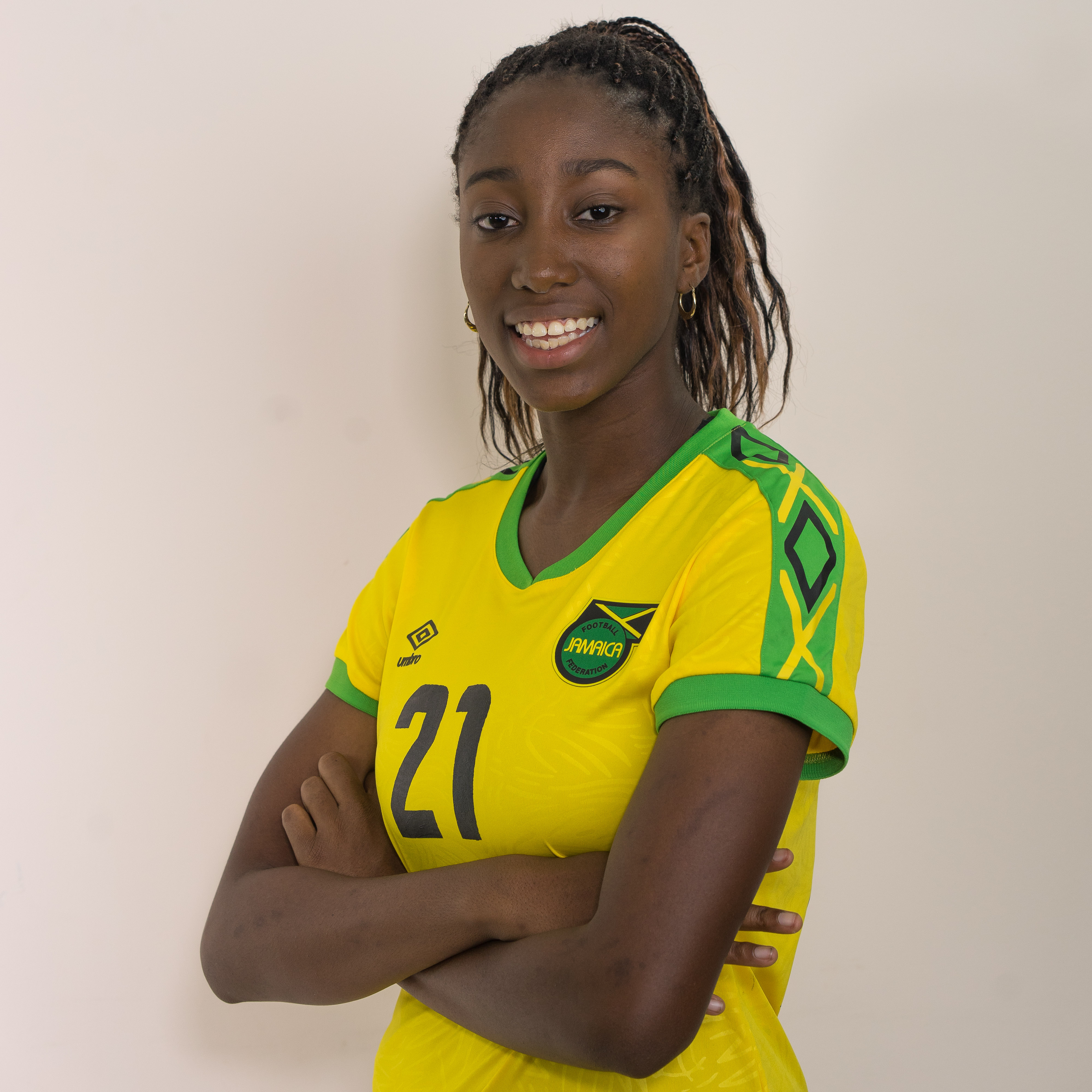
- Adamolekun with Jamaica in 2019

Personal information
- Full name: Olufolasade Ayomide Danielle Adamolekun
- Date of birth: 21 February 2001 (age 25)
- Place of birth: Austin, Texas, United States
- Height: 1.73 m (5 ft 8 in)
- Positions: Forward; midfielder

Team information
- Current team: Logroño United
- Number: 20

Youth career
- Lonestar SC

College career
Years	Team	Apps	(Gls)
2019–2022	USC Trojans	18	(0)

Senior career*
Years	Team	Apps	(Gls)
2023–2026	Hearts	89	(21)
2026–	Logroño United	0	(0)

International career^{‡}
2014	United States U14		
2017	Jamaica U17	3	(4)
2018	Jamaica U20	6	(3)
2019–	Jamaica	19	(1)
Medal record
Representing Jamaica
CONCACAF W Championship
Third place	2022 Mexico
- * Club domestic league appearances and goals as of 13:45, 12 August 2024 (UTC) ‡ National team caps and goals as of 16:50, 13 August 2022 (UTC)

Olufolasade "Sade" Ayomide Danielle Adamolekun (born 21 February 2001) is a professional footballer who plays as a forward or a midfielder for Logroño United. Born in the United States, she represents Jamaica internationally.

She previously played for USC Trojans.

== Early life ==
Born in Austin, Texas to a Yoruba Nigerian father Lanre Adamolekun and Jamaican mother Michelle Adamolekun, Olufolasade was raised with her older brother Nathaniel.

In 2016, Adamolekun was the recipient of the UIL Girls Soccer All District 14-6A Award as a freshman at Lake Travis High School in Austin, Texas. As a sophomore at Fleming Island High School she earned the All-First Coast 1st Team Award in 2017 after scoring 22 goals. In 2017 and 2018, Adamolekun was the recipient of the United Soccer Coaches Youth Girls All-South Region Award. She was also recognized and named to the US Development Academy's U16/U17 East Conference Best XI in the inaugural season of the Girls program in 2018.

=== University of Southern California (2019–2022) ===
Adamolekun accepted a soccer scholarship and started her collegiate career with the University of Southern California in August 2019. Despite continued absences due to the Jamaica women's national football team call-ups and commitments throughout her freshman year, Adamolekun earned the PAC-12 Conference honor of being selected to the "All Freshman Team" for the 2019 collegiate season.

== Club career ==
=== Santa Clara Blue Heat FC ===
Adamolekun was a member of the 2021 United Women's Soccer National Championship Santa Clarita Blue Heat team, contributing a goal and an assist in their 5–0 defeat of Connecticut Fusion FC.

=== Hearts ===
In August 2023, Adamolekun joined Scottish Women's Premier League side Heart of Midlothian on a one-year-contract, with the option of a one-year extension. In 2024 she signed a new contract to remain at the club for another two years.

== International career ==
=== Youth National Teams ===
In March 2014, at the age of 13, Adamolekun attended the United States ID2 National Training camp in Portland, OR. The camp was used as an evaluation for future US national team training camps. Adamolekun was then called into the U-14 US National Team in June, August and October 2014. In April 2014, she attended the U-15 US National Team camps held at the US Soccer National Training Center in Carson, California. At the age of 14, Adamolekun attended the U-17 US Women's National Team camp from June 15, – 22, 2014 at the U.S. Olympic Training Center in Chula Vista, California. In March, September and November 2015, Adamolekun attended the U15 US. National Team camps. Adamolekun was later called into the U-18 U.S. Women's National Team camp in Bradenton, Florida from October 6–13, 2018.

Adamolekun accepted the Jamaica U-17 call-up to participate in the 2018 CONCACAF Women's U-17 Championship qualification from October 16–22, 2017 in Port-au-Prince, Haiti. Adamolekun earned the top goal scorer accolades of the tournament, notching 4 goals in 3 games in qualification.

At the age of 16, Adamolekun was named to the Jamaica U-20 roster for the 2018 CONCACAF Women's U-20 Championship qualification in Basseterre, St. Kitts. In the first match, Adamolekun scored the lone goal to give Jamaica a 1–0 win against the Dominican Republic. Jamaica secured a berth to the 2018 CONCACAF Women's U-20 Championship on the strength of a first-place finish in the final round of the Caribbean qualifying. Adamolekun ended the qualification tournament with two goals in three matches.

Adamolekun was named to the Jamaica 2018 CONCACAF Women's U-20 Championship roster in Couva, Trinidad & Tobago. Adamolekun scored a goal in Jamaica's 2–2 tie against Nicaragua, and was credited with the well taken free kick that put Jamaica on level ground against the United States.

At the young age of 17, Adamolekun first appeared for the senior Jamaica women's national team on 28 October 2018, netting a brace in a 3–0 friendly win against Nottingham Forest Ladies. Note this appearance does not qualify as an international cap nor do the goals count toward her senior international goal tally since the match was played against a club and not a senior national team.

Following the historic FIFA Women's World Cup qualification by the Jamaica women's national football team, Adamolekun was named to its 2019 World Cup training camp roster in January 2019. She received her next call up for the second 2019 World Cup preparation camp in Jamaica, and made her official senior international debut as a substitute in the 1–0 friendly win against Chile on February 28, 2019. She also featured as a substitute in Jamaica's 3–2 friendly win against Chile on March 3, 2019.

Adamolekun was call-up for Jamaica's third 2019 World Cup Preparation camp held in Durban, South Africa in April 2019, where she featured as a substitute in Jamaica's 1–1 tie against South Africa South Africa on April 7, 2019.

Adamolekun was called up for Jamaica's fourth 2019 World Cup Preparation camp in Kingston, Jamaica in May 2019 and featured in the starting line-up and was credited with one assist in Jamaica's 3–1 friendly win against Panama on May 19, 2019.

At the age of 18 years old and prior to graduating High School, Adamolekun was named as one of the 23 players selected by the Jamaica women's national football team for the 2019 FIFA Women's World Cup squads.

On May 24, 2019, the Jamaica women's national football team played their final game in Miramar, Florida in the Reggae Girlz Foundation World Cup Send Off Celebration, before departing for the 2019 FIFA Women's World Cup in France. Adamolekun scored a goal in the Jamaica's 2–1 friendly win against club side FC Surge. Note this appearance does not qualify as an international cap nor dos the goal count toward her senior international goal tally since the match was played against a club and not a senior national team.

=== 2019 FIFA Women's World Cup ===
Adamolekun was a member of the 23 player Jamaica women's national football team that made history as the first Caribbean team to participate in a FIFA Women's World Cup. Adamolekun was one the youngest players on the Jamaica women's national football team and was recognized as one of the top 10 teenagers to watch at the 2019 FIFA Women's World Cup in France. At the age of 18, she made her debut in the 2019 FIFA Women's World Cup for the Jamaica women's national football team starting XI against Italy in Reims, France on June 14, 2019.

=== 2019 Pan American Games ===
Adamolekun was one of the 18 players selected for the 2019 Pan American Games in Lima, Peru, where she was featured in the starting XI and was credited with assist in Jamaica's 1–0 win against Peru on August 6, 2019.

=== 2020 CONCACAF Women's Olympic Qualifying Championship ===
Adamolekun was one of the 20 players selected for the 2020 CONCACAF Women's Olympic Qualifying Championship in Edinberg, Texas, where she was featured in the starting XI against Mexico and St. Kitts & Nevis and was credited with one assist in Jamaica's 7–0 win against St. Kitts & Nevis on February 4, 2020.

=== 2021 WNT Summer Series ===
Adamolekun was one of the 23 players selected for the Jamaica women's national football team (aka Senior Reggae Girlz) 2021 WNT Summer Series tournament from June 10–16, 2021 in Houston, Texas, where Adamolekun was featured in the games against Costa Rica and the USA.

=== 2022 CONCACAF Women's Championship Qualifications ===
Adamolekun was one of the 23 players selected for the Jamaica women's national football team (aka Senior Reggae Girlz) 2022 CONCACAF W Championship qualification tournament from February 16 – April 12, 2022. Adamolekun was featured in the tournament games against Grenada, Bermuda and the Cayman Islands. Adamolekun was credit with an assist in the Reggae Girlz 9–0 win over the Cayman Islands.

=== 2022 CONCACAF Women's Championship ===
Adamolekun was one of the 23 players selected for the 2022 CONCACAF Women's Championship tournament from July 4–18, 2022 in Monterrey, Mexico, and a member of the Jamaica women's national football team that won their second consecutive CONCACAF W Championships Bronze Medal to achieve their second consecutive qualification for the 2023 FIFA Women's World Cup. Adamolekun was featured in the 2022 CONCACAF Women's Championships tournament games against Canada and Haiti.

=== 2023 Central American and Caribbean Games ===
Adamolekun was one of the 20 players selected for the Jamaica women's national football team (aka Senior Reggae Girlz) 2023 Central American and Caribbean Games tournament in San Salvador, El Salvador from June 23 – July 8, 2023. Adamolekun was featured in all three Group B games against El Salvador, Puerto Rico and Mexico, Adamolekun was attributed with scoring a goal in the Reggae Girlz game against Mexico.

== Career statistics ==
=== International goals ===
No.	Date	Venue	Opponent	Score	Result	Competition
1.	3 July 2023	Estadio Las Delicias, Saint Tecla, El Salvador	Mexico	2–4	3–7	CAC games group stage

== Personal life ==
Adamolekun was born in the United States to a Nigerian Yoruba father and a Jamaican mother. Her brother Nathaniel Adamolekun is also a footballer. She attended Lake Travis High School in Austin, Texas for her Freshman year before relocating to Florida, where she graduated from Fleming Island High School in Florida.

== Other work ==
=== Leadership ===
In 2020, during the social unrest across the United States, Adamolekun co-founded the United Black Student Athletes Association (UBSAA) at the University of Southern California (USC) in partnership with the USC Administration to encourage her peers to utilize their platform as student-athletes to make a positive impact and help bridge any gaps at the University of Southern California and within their communities.
