= Maggi Segovia =

Salvadoran footballer (born 2001)

Personal information
- Full name: Maggi Carolina Segovia Romero
- Date of birth: 15 January 2001 (age 25)
- Position: Midfielder

Team information
- Current team: FAS

Senior career*
Years	Team	Apps	(Gls)
- FAS

International career^{‡}
2019–	El Salvador	3	(0)
- * Club domestic league appearances and goals ‡ National team caps and goals as of 11 April 2021.

Maggi Carolina Segovia Romero (born 15 January 2001) is a Salvadoran footballer who plays as a midfielder for CD FAS and the El Salvador women's national team.

== Club career ==
Segovia has played for CD FAS in El Salvador.

== International career ==
Segovia capped for El Salvador at senior level during the 2020 CONCACAF Women's Olympic Qualifying Championship qualification.

== See also ==
- List of El Salvador women's international footballers
