= Rosario Vargas =

Panamanian footballer (born 2002)

Personal information
- Full name: Rosario del Carmen Vargas Sarasqueta
- Date of birth: 9 August 2002 (age 24)
- Place of birth: Panama City, Panama
- Height: 1.65 m (5 ft 5 in)
- Position: Right-back

Team information
- Current team: Monte Soccer Féminas

Youth career
- 2018–2019: Madrid CFF

Senior career*
Years	Team	Apps	(Gls)
2017–2018	Saprissa		
2019–2021	Valencia B	24	(0)
2022–2023	Rayo Vallecano	2	(0)
2023–	Monte Soccer Féminas	0	(0)

International career^{‡}
2021–	Panama	1	(0)
- * Club domestic league appearances and goals as of 6 February 2021. ‡ National team caps and goals as of 11 April 2021.

Rosario del Carmen Vargas Sarasqueta (born 9 August 2002) is a Panamanian footballer who plays as a right-back for Spanish Tercera Federación club CD Monte Soccer Féminas and the Panama women's national team. She is nicknamed Rosi.

== Early life ==
Vargas was born in Panama City.

== Club career ==
Vargas has played for Deportivo Saprissa in Costa Rica and for the Madrid CFF youth team and the Valencia CF reserve team in Spain.

== International career ==
Vargas made her senior debut for Panama on 11 April 2021 in a 0–7 friendly away loss to Japan.
