= Jimena López =

Mexican footballer (born 1999)

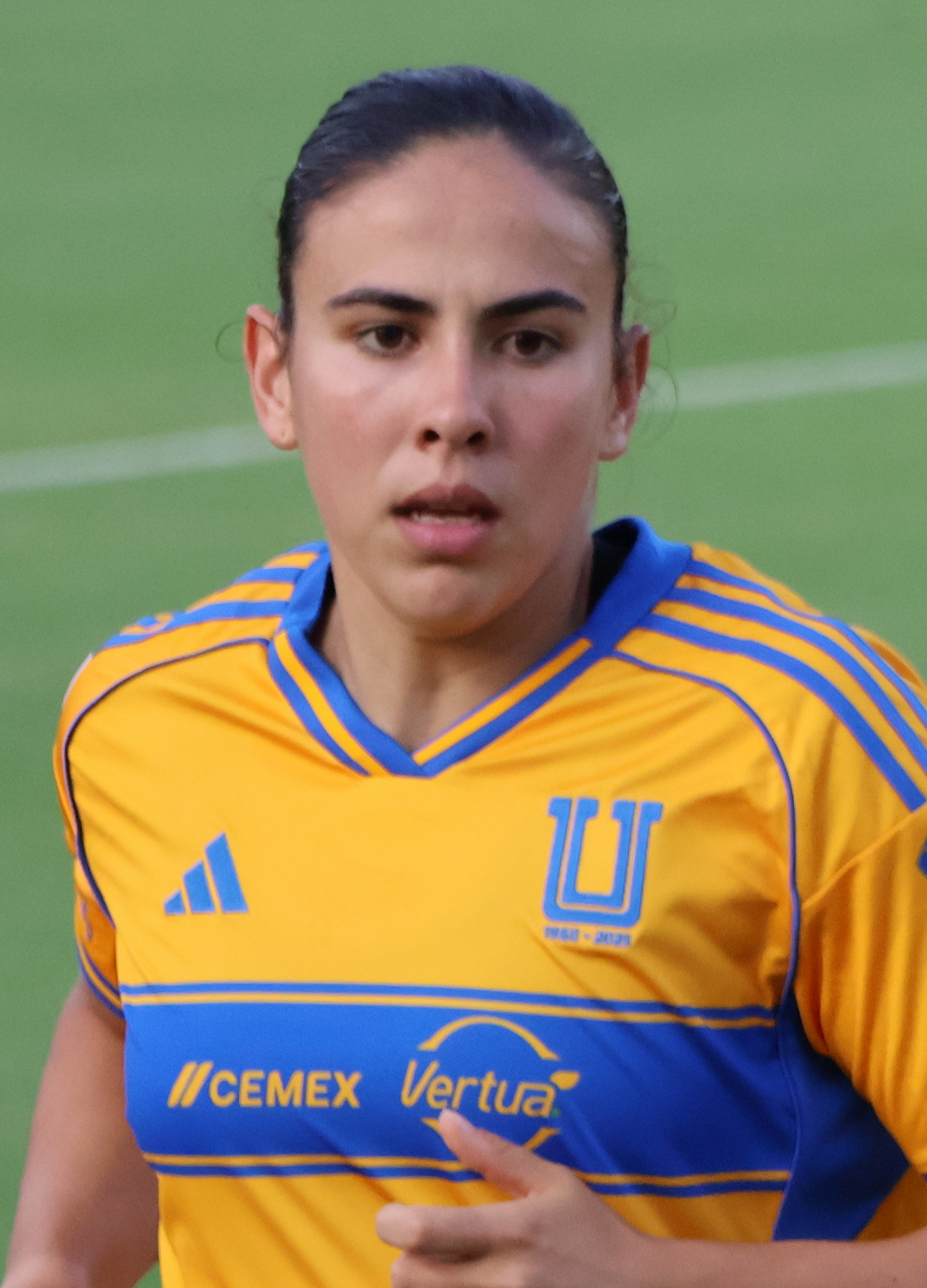
- López with Tigres UANL in 2025

Personal information
- Full name: Jimena López Fuentes
- Date of birth: 30 January 1999 (age 27)
- Place of birth: Mexico City, Mexico
- Height: 1.70 m (5 ft 7 in)
- Position: Left back

Team information
- Current team: UANL
- Number: 6

College career
Years	Team	Apps	(Gls)
2017–2020	Texas A&M Aggies	41	(6)

Senior career*
Years	Team	Apps	(Gls)
2021	Eibar	16	(1)
2021–2024	OL Reign	6	(0)
2023	→ UMF Selfoss (loan)	8	(1)
2023–2024	→ Valencia (loan)	28	(1)
2024–	UANL	28	(1)

International career^{‡}
2014	Mexico U-15	3	(0)
2016	Mexico U-17	4+	(1+)
2018	Mexico U-20	8	(1)
2019–	Mexico	34	(3)
- * Club domestic league appearances and goals as of 14 October 2025 ‡ National team caps and goals as of 14 October 2025

Jimena López Fuentes (born 30 January 1999) is a Mexican professional footballer who plays as a left back for Liga MX Femenil club Tigres UANL and the Mexico national team.

== Club career ==
On 14 January 2021, López was selected in the third round (28th overall) of the 2021 NWSL Draft by OL Reign. However, on 26 January 2021 she elected to sign with Spanish Primera División club Eibar.

López joined Tigres in June 2024.

== International career ==
López represented Mexico at the 2014 Summer Youth Olympics, the 2016 CONCACAF Women's U-17 Championship, the 2016 FIFA U-17 Women's World Cup, the 2018 CONCACAF Women's U-20 Championship and the 2018 FIFA U-20 Women's World Cup. She made her senior debut on 27 February 2019 in a friendly match against Italy.

== International goals ==
Scores and results list Mexico's goal tally first.

No.	Date	Venue	Opponent	Score	Result	Competition
1.	1 February 2020	H-E-B Park, Edinburg, United States	Saint Kitts and Nevis	2–0	6–0	2020 CONCACAF Women's Olympic Qualifying Championship
2.	8 March 2020	AEK Arena, Larnaca, Cyprus	Slovakia	2–2	2–2	2020 Cyprus Women's Cup
3.	9 April 2022	Raymond E. Guishard Technical Centre, Anguilla	Anguilla	8–0	11-0	2022 CONCACAF W Championship qualification

== Honors ==
OL Reign

- NWSL Shield: 2022
- The Women's Cup: 2022

Tigres UANL Apertura 2025
