= Giselle Washington =

Jamaican footballer (born 2001)

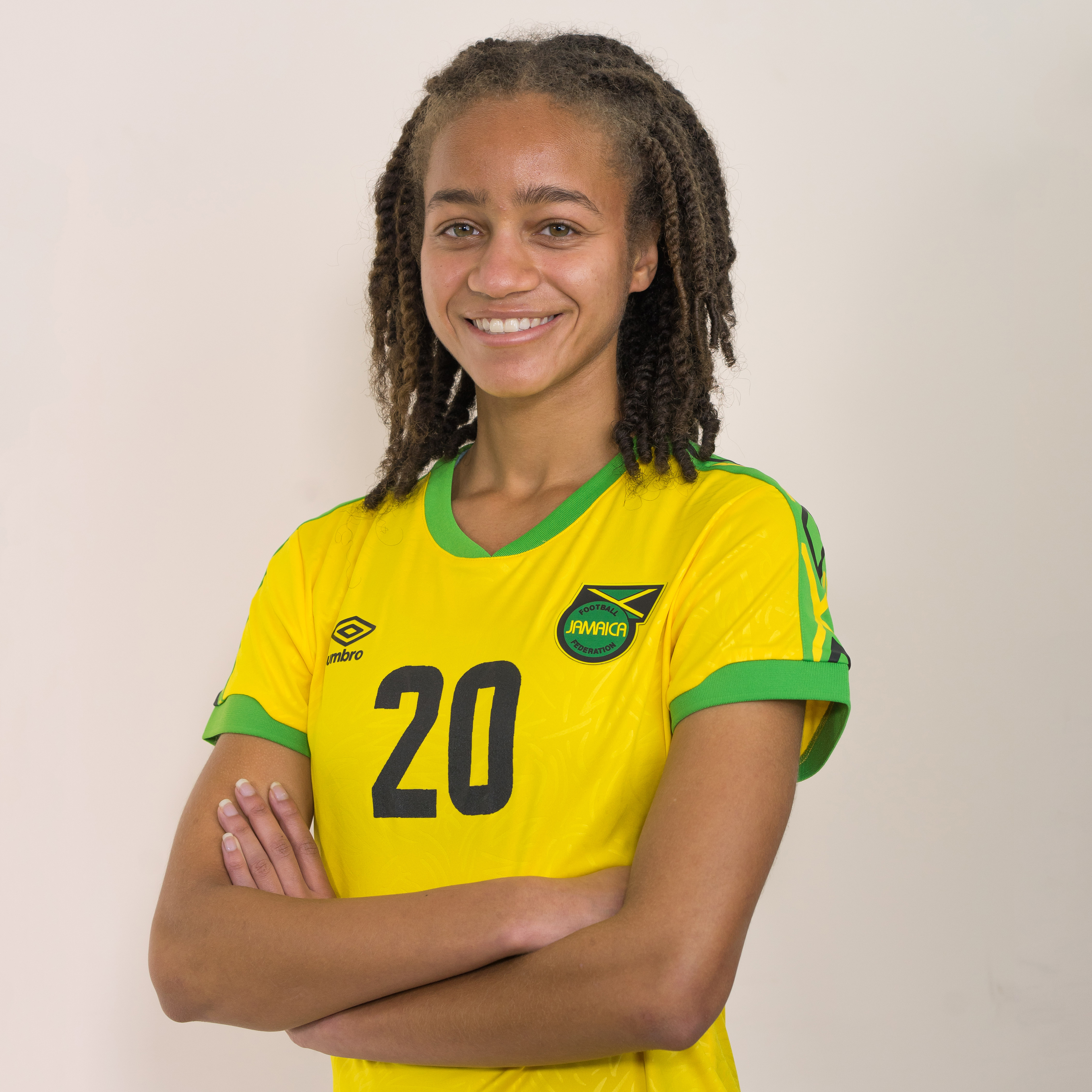

Personal information
- Full name: Giselle Monne Washington
- Date of birth: 3 April 2001 (age 25)
- Place of birth: DeKalb County, Georgia, U.S.
- Height: 1.78 m (5 ft 10 in)
- Positions: Midfielder; defender

Team information
- Current team: Tennessee Lady Volunteers
- Number: 28

Youth career
- Concorde Fire

College career
Years	Team	Apps	(Gls)
2019–	Tennessee Lady Volunteers	43	(2)

International career^{‡}
2016	Jamaica U15	1+	(1)
2016–2017	Jamaica U17	2+	(2)
2018	Jamaica U20	2	(0)
2018–	Jamaica	11	(2)
Medal record
Representing Jamaica
CONCACAF W Championship
Third place	2018 United States
- ‡ National team caps and goals as of 28 February 2019

Giselle Monne Washington (born 3 April 2001) is a professional footballer who plays as a midfielder for the Tennessee Lady Volunteers. Born in the United States, she represents Jamaica internationally.

== Club career ==
Washington committed to the University of Tennessee.

== International career ==
Washington represented Jamaica at the 2016 CONCACAF Women's U-17 Championship, the 2016 CONCACAF Girls' U-15 Championship, the 2018 CONCACAF Women's U-20 Championship and the 2018 CONCACAF Women's U-17 Championship qualification. She made her senior debut in 2018.

=== International goals ===
Scores and results list Jamaica's goal tally first

No.	Date	Venue	Opponent	Score	Result	Competition
1	9 May 2018	Stade Sylvio Cator, Port-au-Prince, Haiti	Guadeloupe	8–0	13–0	2018 CONCACAF Women's Championship qualification
2	9 May 2018	Stade Sylvio Cator, Port-au-Prince, Haiti	Guadeloupe	12–0	13–0	2018 CONCACAF Women's Championship qualification
3	27 August 2018	National Stadium, Kingston, Jamaica	Bermuda	4–0	4–0	2018 CONCACAF Women's Championship qualification
4	31 August 2018	National Stadium, Kingston, Jamaica	Trinidad and Tobago	1–1	4–1	2018 CONCACAF Women's Championship qualification

== Personal life ==
Her mother was born in Kingston. She has three siblings Alessandra, Solai and Joel. Her sisters also play soccer. Alessandra Washington plays on the collegiate level, and Solai Washington Also, plays on the collegiate level and represents Jamaica. Her younger brother is Joel Washington.
