= Taryn Torres =

American soccer player (born 1999)

- Torres with Gotham FC in 2025

Personal information
- Full name: Taryn Layne Torres
- Date of birth: April 23, 1999 (age 27)
- Height: 5 ft 6 in (1.68 m)
- Position: Midfielder

Team information
- Current team: Gotham FC
- Number: 8

Youth career
- FC Dallas

College career
Years	Team	Apps	(Gls)
2017–2021	Virginia Cavaliers	100	(14)

Senior career*
Years	Team	Apps	(Gls)
2021–	Gotham FC	52	(0)

International career
	United States U-17	14	(1)
- United States U-18
2017–2018	United States U-20	11	(2)
- * Club domestic league appearances and goals as of November 1, 2026

Taryn Layne Torres (born April 23, 1999) is an American professional soccer player who plays as a midfielder for Gotham FC of the National Women's Soccer League (NWSL). She played college soccer for the Virginia Cavaliers and was selected by Gotham in the 2021 NWSL Draft. She has represented the United States at the youth international level.

== Early life ==
Torres grew up in Frisco, Texas, one of two daughters born to Eric and Misty Torres. Her father played college baseball at New Mexico, and her sister, Hollyn, played college soccer at Harvard and South Carolina. She played multiple sports growing up before electing to focus on soccer. She played club soccer for FC Dallas in the ECNL and the amateur WPSL. She attended Centennial High School, where she lettered in high school volleyball and four years of soccer. She was named an NSCAA All-American as a senior in 2016.

== College career ==
Torres played five years as a starting midfielder for the Virginia Cavaliers. She led the team in scoring with eight goals as a freshman in the 2017 season, being named to the Atlantic Coast Conference all-freshman team and All-ACC third team. She scored two goals and provided a team-high six assists as a sophomore in 2018. She started every game for the Cavaliers as a junior in 2019, being named second-team All-ACC, and helped reach the final of the ACC tournament and earn a number-one seed in the NCAA championship.

After sitting out most of the fall season due to injury in 2020, Torres was drafted by Sky Blue FC (soon to become NJ/NY Gotham FC) but decided to stay at Virginia, not wanting to her injury-shortened year to be her last. She provided two assists during the NCAA tournament that was pushed to the spring, helping Virginia reach the national semifinals. They lost there to eventual champions Florida State in a penalty shootout, with Torres's kick one of two shots saved by the keeper. She was named third-team All-ACC in her graduate season in 2021, helping Virginia win the ACC regular-season title. They lost to Florida State in the conference tournament final and were upset by BYU in the third round of the NCAA tournament.

== Club career ==
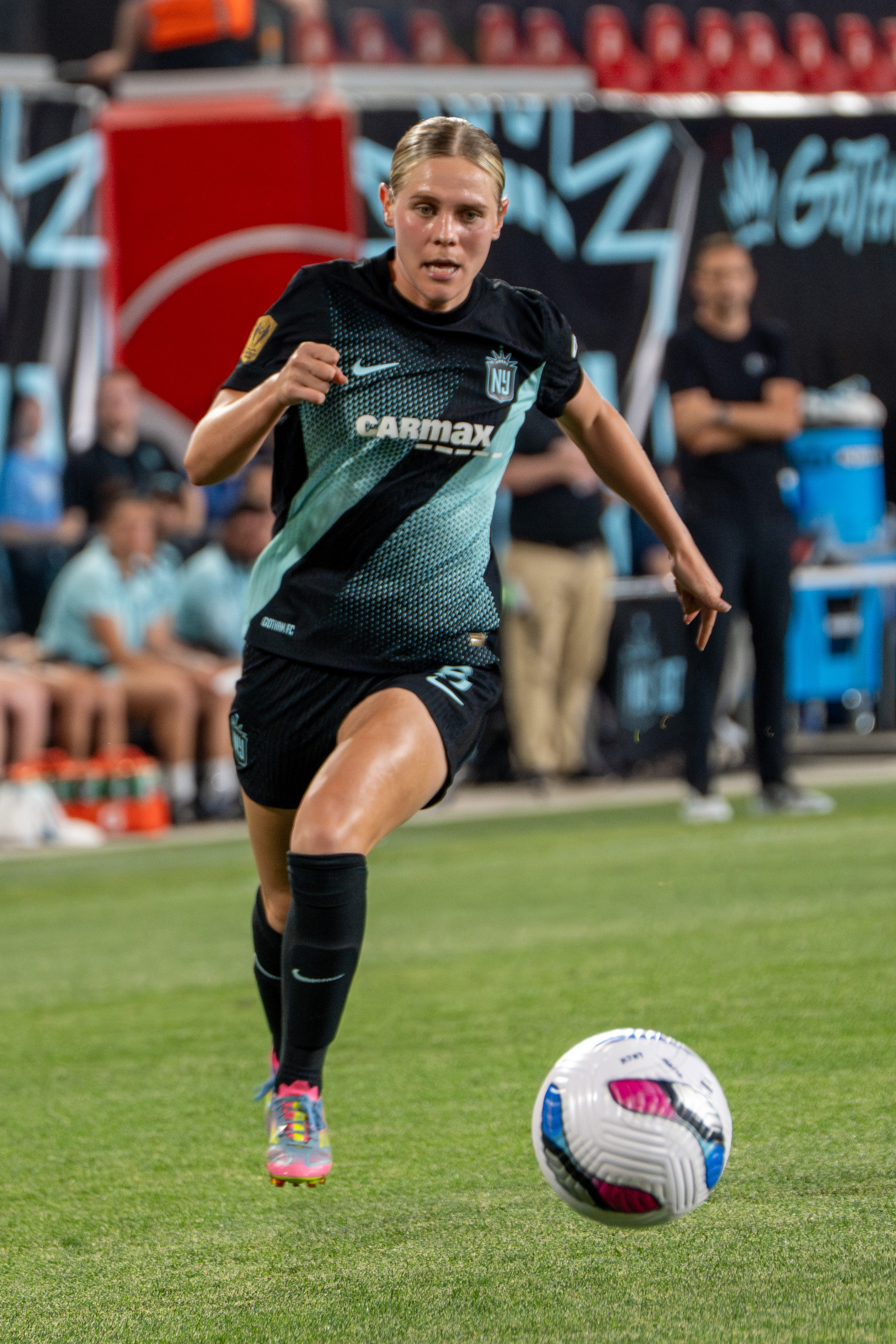
Torres with Gotham FC in 2025

Torres was drafted by Sky Blue FC (soon renamed NJ/NY Gotham FC) 23rd overall in the third round of the 2021 NWSL Draft but chose not to turn professional until completing an additional year of college soccer. During the summer of 2021, she played for the NJ/NY Gotham Reserves team in the Women's Premier Soccer League, leading them to win the Metropolitan Conference with a 9–0 record. She also trained with Gotham's first team during that college off-season. Following her fifth year at Virginia, she signed her first professional contract with Gotham on December 22, 2021, signing for one year with an option to extend.

Torres made her professional debut on March 19, coming on for Jennifer Cudjoe in a 2–0 loss to the North Carolina Courage in the NWSL Challenge Cup group stage. She made 13 appearances (9 starts) during the 2022 regular season, filling a role that had belonged to Allie Long, who was out on maternity leave, but Gotham struggled and finished at the bottom of the NWSL table. She missed the entire 2023 season due to an ACL injury as Gotham turned things around and won the NWSL Championship.

Torres returned to action on March 24, 2024, appearing in Gotham's season-opening 1–0 win against the Portland Thorns. She made 11 appearances (1 start) in the 2024 regular season as they finished third in the standings. She also played in 3 games in the 2024 NWSL x Liga MX Femenil Summer Cup, starting in their 2–0 final loss to the Kansas City Current, and started all 4 games of the 2024–25 CONCACAF W Champions Cup group stage as they advanced to the knockout rounds.

On May 25, 2025, Torres started in the 2025 CONCACAF W Champions Cup final against Tigres, where Gotham won 1–0 to become the inaugural winners of the competition. After making 15 league appearances for Gotham in her fourth professional year, Torres was placed on the season-ending injury list in September 2025 after suffering yet another ACL injury.

== International career ==
Torres trained with the United States youth national team beginning at the age of 14 in 2013. She made 14 appearances at the under-17 level, including helping win the 2016 CONCACAF Women's U-17 Championship, but was one of B. J. Snow's final cuts ahead of the 2016 FIFA U-17 Women's World Cup. After training with the under-19s and playing friendlies for the under-18s, she returned to the competitive stage rejoining the under-20 team in 2017. She played for them at the 2018 CONCACAF Women's U-20 Championship, where she scored her country's first goal of the tournament; converted her penalty kick in their semifinal shootout; and started in the final against Mexico, where they lost on penalties. She was on the roster at the 2018 FIFA U-20 Women's World Cup, where they failed to make it out of the group stage. She was called up to friendlies with the under-23 team during her rookie NWSL season in 2022.

== Personal life ==
In 2024, Torres appeared in the first season of The Offseason, a reality television series following a group of NWSL players training before the new season.

== Honors and awards ==
Virginia Cavaliers

- Atlantic Coast Conference: 2021

Gotham FC

- NWSL Championship: 2023, 2025
- NWSL Shield: 2026
- NWSL Challenge Cup: 2026
- CONCACAF W Champions Cup: 2024–25

Individual

- Second-team All-ACC: 2019
- Third-team All-ACC: 2017, 2018, 2021
