= Catalina Estrada =

Costa Rican footballer (born 1998)

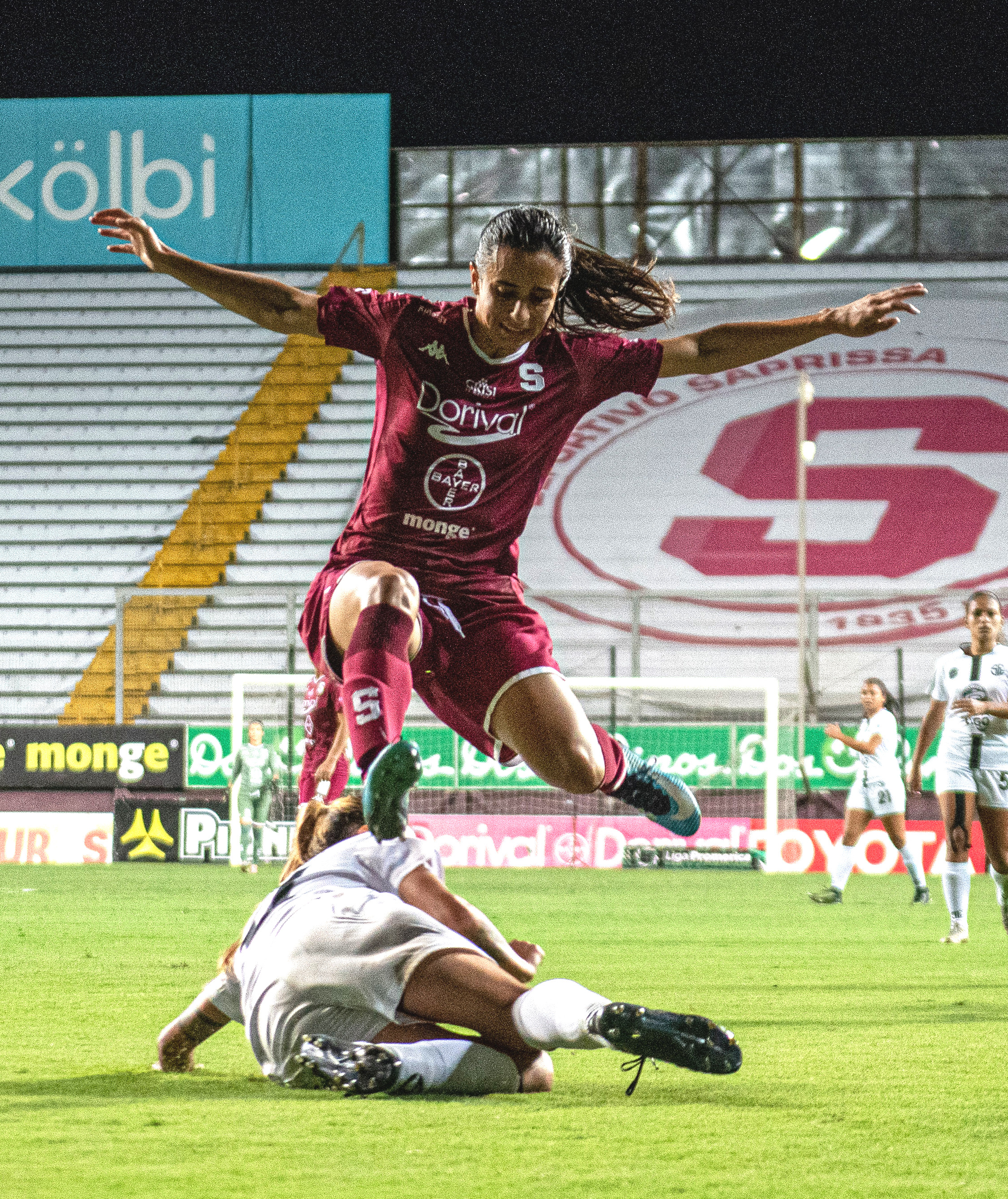
- Estrada in 2020

Personal information
- Full name: Catalina Estrada Carvajal
- Date of birth: 11 October 1998 (age 28)
- Place of birth: San Carlos, Costa Rica
- Height: 1.63 m (5 ft 4 in)
- Position: Forward

Senior career*
| Years | Team | Apps | (Gls) |
| –2023 | Saprissa | | |
| 2023 | Cruz Azul | 8 | (3) |

International career^{‡}
| 2023– | Costa Rica | 2 | (0) |
- * Club domestic league appearances and goals ‡ National team caps and goals as of 20 July 2023 (prior the 2023 FIFA Women's World Cup)

Catalina Estrada Carvajal (born 11 October 1998) is a Costa Rican professional footballer who plays as a forward for the Costa Rica women's national team.

== Early life ==
Catalina Estrada Carvajal was born on 11 October 1998 in San Carlos, and is the sixth of fourteen siblings. Growing up they all played football; Estrada played with two of them on a men's team, all as forwards. She went to live with one of her sisters, who supported her in her early career, when she was a teenager.

== Club career ==
After playing for a local men's team in Aguas Zarcas, San Carlos, for eight years, Estrada moved to San José to join Women's Premier Division club Saprissa. She is known for her calmness on the pitch, being neither a vocal nor expressive player.

As of 2021, she also works as a trainer at a strength training gym and studies nutrition.

== International career ==
In 2018, Estrada played for the Costa Rica under-20 team, scoring the team's only goal in a 1–3 loss on her youth debut. In early 2021, she was one of 28 young players called into development training with the senior squad. She was pleased at the inclusion of so many players, while expressing that she wanted to be one of those to stay on and break into the national team for the World Cup qualifiers at the end of the year. Despite having to work other jobs, and saying the team was not wholly professional, Estrada said that it had improved a lot between 2019 and 2021, when she made her senior debut. She was included in Costa Rica's squad for the 2023 FIFA Women's World Cup.
