= Mariela Campos (footballer, born 1998) =

Costa Rican footballer (born 1998)

Personal information
- Full name: Mariela Campos Alvarado
- Date of birth: 7 October 1998 (age 28)
- Place of birth: Grecia, Costa Rica
- Height: 1.67 m (5 ft 6 in)
- Position: Midfielder

Team information
- Current team: Saprissa
- Number: 7

Youth career
- 20??–201?: CCDR Liberia

Senior career*
Years	Team	Apps	(Gls)
20??–201?	CCDR Liberia		
201?–20??	Moravia		
2020–2023	Herediano	55	(12)
2023–	Saprissa	13	(7)

International career^{‡}
2014	Costa Rica U17	2	(0)
2018	Costa Rica U20	3	(0)
2018–	Costa Rica	13	(0)
- * Club domestic league appearances and goals as of 14 October 2023 ‡ National team caps and goals as of 25 September 2023

Mariela Campos Alvarado (born 7 October 1998) is a Costa Rican footballer who plays as a midfielder for Costa Rican Women's Premier Division club Deportivo Saprissa and the Costa Rica women's national team.

== Club career ==
Campos was active at Herediano until the end of January 2023. Since then, she has been under contract with Saprissa.

== International career ==
Campos took part in the 2014 FIFA U-17 Women's World Cup with the Costa Rican U-17 team and made two appearances there. She also appeared in 2018 CONCACAF Women's U-20 Championship, where she again received playing time in three games.

Campos made her senior debut for the Costa Rican national team was on June 10, 2018, in a 4–0 friendly loss to Chile. A month later, she and her team took part in the 2018 Central American and Caribbean Games tournament, where she and her team took second place. After that, she was also active in the 2018 CONCACAF Women's Championship qualification.

On 6 July 2023, Campos was called up to the 23-player squad to play the 2023 World Cup.
