= Jadyn Matthews =

Jamaican footballer (born 1999)

Personal information
- Full name: Jadyn Aliana Matthews
- Date of birth: 16 November 1999 (age 26)
- Place of birth: Pembroke Pines, Florida, U.S.
- Height: 1.68 m (5 ft 6 in)
- Positions: Defender; midfielder

Team information
- Current team: Cornell Big Red
- Number: 15

Youth career
- 2014: Dwyer Panthers
- Boca United Soccer Academy

College career
Years	Team	Apps	(Gls)
2018–2021	Cornell Big Red	35	(2)

Senior career*
Years	Team	Apps	(Gls)
2019	Florida Krush	2	(0)

International career^{‡}
2018	Jamaica U20	3	(1)
2018–	Jamaica	8	(0)
Medal record
Representing Jamaica
CONCACAF W Championship
Third place	2018 United States
- * Club domestic league appearances and goals ‡ National team caps and goals as of 15 January 2022

Jadyn Aliana Matthews (born 16 November 1999) is an American-born Jamaican footballer who plays as a defender for Cornell Big Red and the Jamaica women's national team.

== International career ==
Matthews represented Jamaica at the 2018 CONCACAF Women's U-20 Championship. She made her senior debut in a 1–2 loss win against Venezuela on 19 July 2018.

== Personal life ==
Matthews is related to Olympic gold-medalist Don Quarrie.
