= 2018 CONCACAF Women's U-20 Championship =

9th edition of the CONCACAF Women's U-20 Championship

Tournament details
- Host country: Trinidad and Tobago
- City: Couva
- Dates: 18–28 January
- Teams: 8 (from 1 confederation)
- Venue: 1 (in 1 host city)

Final positions
- Champions: Mexico (1st title)
- Runners-up: United States
- Third place: Haiti
- Fourth place: Canada

Tournament statistics
- Matches played: 16
- Goals scored: 51 (3.19 per match)
- Top scorer: (Canada) Jordyn Huitema (5 goals)
- Best player: (Mexico) Miriam García
- Best goalkeeper: (Mexico) Emily Alvarado
- Fair play award: Mexico

The 2018 CONCACAF Women's U-20 Championship was the 9th edition of the CONCACAF Women's U-20 Championship, the biennial international youth football championship organised by CONCACAF for the women's under-20 national teams of the North, Central American and Caribbean region. The tournament was hosted by Trinidad and Tobago and took place between 18–28 January 2018, as announced by CONCACAF on 31 October 2017. A total of eight teams played in the tournament.

The top three teams of the tournament qualified for the 2018 FIFA U-20 Women's World Cup in France as the CONCACAF representatives. The tournament also determined which three Caribbean nations participate in the 2018 Central American and Caribbean Games.

Mexico defeated defending champions United States in the final to win their first title.

== Qualification ==
Regional qualification tournaments were held to determine the teams playing in the final tournament.

=== Qualified teams ===
The following eight teams qualified for the final tournament.

Team	Qualification	Appearance	Previous best performances	Previous FIFA U-20 Women's World Cup appearances
North American Zone (NAFU)
Canada	Automatic	7th	Champions (2004, 2008)	7
Mexico	Automatic	9th	Runners-up (2010, 2014)	7
United States	Automatic	9th	Champions (2006, 2010, 2012, 2014, 2015)	8
Central American Zone (UNCAF) qualified through Central American qualifying competition
Costa Rica	Classification stage winners	6th	Third place (2004, 2010, 2014)	2
Nicaragua	Classification stage winners	2nd	Group stage (2008)	0
Caribbean Zone (CFU) qualified through Caribbean qualifying competition
Trinidad and Tobago	Hosts	8th	Fourth place (2014)	0
Jamaica	Final round winners	9th	Fourth place (2006)	0
Haiti	Final round runners-up	4th	Group stage (2002, 2012, 2015)	0

== Venues ==
All matches of the tournament were played at Ato Boldon Stadium in Couva.

2018 CONCACAF Women's U-20 Championship is located in Trinidad and Tobago	Couva
2018 CONCACAF Women's U-20 Championship is located in Trinidad and Tobago	Ato Boldon Stadium
2018 CONCACAF Women's U-20 Championship is located in Trinidad and Tobago	Capacity: 10,000

== Draw ==
The draw of the tournament was held on 7 November 2017, 10:00 AST (UTC−4), at the Hyatt Regency Trinidad & Tobago in Port of Spain.

The eight teams were drawn into two groups of four teams. Tournament hosts Trinidad and Tobago were seeded in position A1, while defending champions United States were seeded in position B1. The remaining six teams, including the two teams from the Caribbean Zone whose identity were not known at the time of the draw, were allocated to pots 2–4, and drawn to the remaining six positions.

Pot 1	Pot 2	Pot 3	Pot 4
Trinidad and Tobago (Position A1); United States (Position B1)	Canada; Mexico	Costa Rica; Nicaragua	Jamaica; Haiti

== Squads ==
Players born on or after 1 January 1998 are eligible to compete in the tournament. Each team must register a squad of 20 players, two of whom must be goalkeepers.

== Group stage ==
The top two teams of each group advance to the semi-finals.

Tiebreakers

Teams are ranked according to points (3 points for a win, 1 point for a draw, 0 points for a loss), and if tied on points, the following tiebreaking criteria are applied, in the order given, to determine the rankings:

1. Points in head-to-head matches among tied teams;
2. Goal difference in head-to-head matches among tied teams;
3. Goals scored in head-to-head matches among tied teams;
4. Goal difference in all group matches;
5. Goals scored in all group matches;
6. Drawing of lots.

All times are local, AST (UTC−4).

=== Group A ===
Pos	Team	Pld	W	D	L	GF	GA	GD	Pts	Qualification
1	Canada	3	3	0	0	11	2	+9	9	Knockout stage
2	Haiti	3	2	0	1	6	8	−2	6	Knockout stage
3	Costa Rica	3	1	0	2	5	7	−2	3	
4	Trinidad and Tobago (H)	3	0	0	3	4	9	−5	0	

Source: CONCACAF
Rules for classification: Group stage tiebreakers
(H) Hosts
18 January 2018
16:00

Costa Rica	1–3	Canada
Estrada 28'	Report	Huitema 50', 66'; Carle 57'

Ato Boldon Stadium, Couva
Referee: Tatiana Guzmán (Nicaragua)
18 January 2018
18:30

Trinidad and Tobago	2–3	Haiti
D. Prince 3'; Johnson 11'	Report	Mondésir 26', 45+2', 54'

Ato Boldon Stadium, Couva
Referee: Katja Koroleva (United States)

20 January 2018
16:00

Haiti	3–2	Costa Rica
Éloissaint 5'; Nicolas 32'; Dumonay 45+4'	Report	D. Coto 61'; Corrales 74'

Ato Boldon Stadium, Couva
Referee: Mirian León (El Salvador)
20 January 2018
18:30

Canada	4–1	Trinidad and Tobago
Huitema 9', 51', 87'; Carle 67' (pen.)	Report	A. Prince 3'

Ato Boldon Stadium, Couva
Referee: Melissa Borjas (Honduras)

22 January 2018
16:00

Haiti	0–4	Canada
	Report	Flynn 5', 7', 18'; Boychuk 81'

Ato Boldon Stadium, Couva
Referee: Melissa Pérez (Panama)
22 January 2018
18:30

Trinidad and Tobago	1–2	Costa Rica
D. Prince 38'	Report	F. Villalobos 47' (pen.); Corrales 57'

Ato Boldon Stadium, Couva
Referee: Katja Koroleva (United States)

=== Group B ===
Pos	Team	Pld	W	D	L	GF	GA	GD	Pts	Qualification
1	United States	3	3	0	0	6	2	+4	9	Knockout stage
2	Mexico	3	2	0	1	7	2	+5	6	Knockout stage
3	Nicaragua	3	0	1	2	2	6	−4	1	
4	Jamaica	3	0	1	2	3	8	−5	1	

Source: CONCACAF
Rules for classification: Group stage tiebreakers
19 January 2018
16:00

Mexico	4–0	Jamaica
Ovalle 26'; Martínez 33'; Dennis 55' (o.g.); Cruz 79'	Report

Ato Boldon Stadium, Couva
Referee: Carol Anne Chenard (Canada)
19 January 2018
18:30

United States	2–0	Nicaragua
Torres 17'; Kuhlmann 53'	Report

Ato Boldon Stadium, Couva
Attendance: 125
Referee: Crystal Sobers (Trinidad and Tobago)

21 January 2018
16:00

Nicaragua	0–2	Mexico
	Report	Cázares 16'; Cruz 74'

Ato Boldon Stadium, Couva
Referee: Astrid Gramajo (Guatemala)
21 January 2018
18:30

Jamaica	1–2	United States
Matthews 88'	Report	Smith 42'; Howell 89'

Ato Boldon Stadium, Couva
Attendance: 245
Referee: Carol Anne Chenard (Canada)

23 January 2018
16:00

United States	2–1	Mexico
Kim 30'; Sanchez 39'	Report	Martínez 75'

Ato Boldon Stadium, Couva
Attendance: 112
Referee: Tatiana Guzmán (Nicaragua)
23 January 2018
18:30

Nicaragua	2–2	Jamaica
Gilday 23' (pen.); Y. Flores 82'	Report	Adamolekun 6'; Grant 64'

Ato Boldon Stadium, Couva
Referee: Crystal Sobers (Trinidad and Tobago)

== Knockout stage ==
In the semi-finals, if the match is level at the end of 90 minutes, no extra time is played and the match is decided by a penalty shoot-out. In the third place match and final, if the match is level at the end of 90 minutes, extra time is played, and if still tied after extra time, the match is decided by a penalty shoot-out.

=== Bracket ===
Semi-finals
26 January – Couva
United States (p)	1 (3)
Haiti	1 (0)
26 January – Couva
Canada	1 (3)
Mexico (p)	1 (4)

Final
28 January – Couva
United States	1 (2)
Mexico (p)	1 (4)
Third place
28 January – Couva
Haiti	1
Canada	0

=== Semi-finals ===
Winners qualify for 2018 FIFA U-20 Women's World Cup.

26 January 2018
15:30

United States	1–1	Haiti
Howell 76'	Report	Mondésir 90+2'
Penalties
Smith (penalty missed); Torres (penalty scored); Howell (penalty scored); Morse (penalty scored)	3–0	(penalty missed) Mondésir; (penalty missed) Dumonay; (penalty missed) Éloissaint

Ato Boldon Stadium, Couva
Referee: Melissa Borjas (Honduras)

26 January 2018
18:30

Canada	1–1	Mexico
Carle 80'	Report	López 34'
Penalties
Young (penalty scored); Regan (penalty scored); Carle (penalty scored); Grosso (penalty missed); Huitema (penalty missed)	3–4	(penalty scored) Martínez; (penalty scored) Rodríguez; (penalty missed) García; (penalty scored) López; (penalty scored) Juárez

Ato Boldon Stadium, Couva
Referee: Crystal Sobers (Trinidad and Tobago)

=== Third place match ===
Winner qualifies for 2018 FIFA U-20 Women's World Cup.

28 January 2018
14:00

Haiti	1–0	Canada
Jeudy 18'	Report

Ato Boldon Stadium, Couva
Referee: Katja Koroleva (United States)

=== Final ===
28 January 2018
17:00

United States	1–1 (a.e.t.)	Mexico
Davidson 49'	Report	Cázares 33'
Penalties
Pinto (penalty missed); I. Rodriguez (penalty scored); Pickett (penalty missed); Davidson (penalty scored)	2–4	(penalty scored) Martínez; (penalty missed) Rodríguez; (penalty scored) López; (penalty scored) Villegas; (penalty scored) Cruz

Ato Boldon Stadium, Couva
Attendance: 275
Referee: Carol-Anne Chenard (Canada)

== Winners ==
2018 CONCACAF Women's U-20 Championship

Mexico
First title

== Qualification for international tournaments ==
=== Qualified teams for FIFA U-20 Women's World Cup ===
The following three teams from CONCACAF qualified for the 2018 FIFA U-20 Women's World Cup.

Team	Qualified on	Previous appearances in FIFA U-20 Women's World Cup^{1}
Mexico	26 January 2018	7 (2002, 2006, 2008, 2010, 2012, 2014, 2016)
United States	26 January 2018	8 (**2002**, 2004, 2006, **2008**, 2010, **2012**, 2014, 2016)
Haiti	28 January 2018	0 (debut)

^{1} Bold indicates champions for that year. Italic indicates hosts for that year.

=== Qualified teams for Central American and Caribbean Games ===
The competition was used to decide the three teams from the Caribbean Football Union which would qualify for the 2018 Central American and Caribbean Games. As only three Caribbean teams participated in the final tournament, they all qualified:

- Haiti
- Jamaica
- Trinidad and Tobago

== Goalscorers ==
5 goals

- (Canada) Jordyn Huitema

4 goals

- (Haiti) Nérilia Mondésir

3 goals

- (Canada) Gabrielle Carle
- (Canada) Shana Flynn

2 goals

- (Costa Rica) Hillary Corrales
- (Trinidad and Tobago) Dennecia Prince
- (Mexico) Dayana Cázares
- (Mexico) Belén Cruz
- (Mexico) Katty Martínez
- (United States) Jaelin Howell

1 goal

- (Canada) Tanya Boychuk
- (Costa Rica) Daniela Coto
- (Costa Rica) Catalina Estrada
- (Costa Rica) Fabiola Villalobos
- (Haiti) Melchie Dumonay
- (Haiti) Roseline Éloissaint
- (Haiti) Sherly Jeudy
- (Haiti) Nelourde Nicolas
- (Jamaica) Olufolasade Adamolekun
- (Jamaica) Jazmin Grant
- (Jamaica) Jadyn Matthews
- (Mexico) Jimena López
- (Mexico) Jacqueline Ovalle
- (Nicaragua) Yessenia Flores
- (Nicaragua) Jaclyn Gilday
- (Trinidad and Tobago) Kédie Johnson
- (Trinidad and Tobago) Aaliyah Prince
- (United States) Tierna Davidson
- (United States) Abigail Kim
- (United States) Civana Kuhlmann
- (United States) Ashley Sanchez
- (United States) Sophia Smith
- (United States) Taryn Torres

1 own goal

- (Jamaica) Chyanne Dennis (playing against Mexico)

== Awards ==
The following awards were given at the conclusion of the tournament.

Golden Ball	Golden Boot	Golden Glove
(Mexico) Miriam García	(Canada) Jordyn Huitema	(Mexico) Emily Alvarado
CONCACAF Fair Play Award
Mexico

Best XI

- Goalkeeper: (Mexico) Emily Alvarado
- Right Back: (United States) Kiara Pickett
- Center Back: (Mexico) Miriam García
- Center Back: (Canada) Maya Antoine
- Left Back: (Mexico) Jimena López
- Right Midfielder: (Canada) Jordyn Huitema
- Center Midfielder: (United States) Jaelin Howell
- Center Midfielder: (Haiti) Melchie Dumonay
- Center Midfielder: (United States) Savannah DeMelo
- Left Midfielder: (Mexico) Jacqueline Ovalle
- Forward: (Haiti) Nérilia Mondésir
