= KW United (2027) =

Canadian soccer team

- Full name: Waterloo Minor Soccer Club
- Founded: 1971 (as Waterloo Minor SC)
- Stadium: Warrior Field, University of Waterloo
- Head Coach: John O'Brien (men); Chris Kraemer (women)
- League: League1 Ontario
- 2025: L1O-C, 10th (men); L1O-P, 6th (women)
- Website: https://www.waterloounited.com/

KW United is a Canadian semi-professional soccer club based in Waterloo, Ontario that plays in the League1 Ontario men's and women's divisions. Their home stadium is Warrior Field at the University of Waterloo.

Waterloo United, a youth club founded in 1971, launched their semi-professional side in League1 Ontario in 2021. In 2022, Waterloo United partnered with Borussia Dortmund, becoming part of their BVB International Academy North America program, rebranding the League1 Ontario club to BVB International Academy Waterloo from 2022 through 2024, before ending the partnership in 2025 and re-verting to the Waterloo United name. In 2026, they announced they would partner with Kitchener TFC to jointly run the semi-professional team, re-branding the semi-professional team to KW United for the 2027 season.

== History ==
The club was founded in 1971 as the Waterloo Minor Soccer Club. In 2011, the club rebranded as Waterloo United. In 2019, the club was awarded the Canada Soccer National Youth Club Licence by the Canadian Soccer Association.

In 2020, the team was to begin play with a U21 team in the League1 Ontario Reserve Division, however, the season was cancelled due to the COVID-19 pandemic. In 2021, lining up with the club's 50th anniversary, they added a team in the League1 Ontario main division. The club also added a team in the League1 Ontario women's division for the 2021 season. The city of Guelph also added men's and women's teams in 2021, setting up a natural local rivalry for the two clubs. However, due to the COVID-19 pandemic, Waterloo deferred their entrance to the League1 Ontario top division until 2022.

In 2022, the club struck an affiliation agreement with German club Borussia Dortmund. As part of the agreement, the League1 Ontario teams competed under the name BVB IA Waterloo. In February 2025, the club returned to using the Waterloo name for their League1 Ontario teams, while the youth sides retained the BVB branding. In August 2025, the club fully ended the partnership, returning to using the Waterloo United branding for the whole club.

In March 2026, Waterloo United announced a partnership with Kitchener SC to jointly support the Ontario Premier League (re-branded from League1 Ontario in 2026) team, with the team to announce a re-brand in 2027 (they will continue to use the Waterloo United name for 2026 - both clubs would still operate their own separate youth programs). In October 2026, it was revealed that the team would be known as KW United.

== Seasons ==
=== Men ===
Season	League	Teams	Record	Rank	Playoffs	League Cup	Ref
2021	League1 Ontario Summer Championship	11	2–5–0	5th	–	not held	
2022	League1 Ontario	22	7–1–13	15th	Did not qualify	not held	
2023	League1 Ontario	21	1–0–19	21st	Did not qualify	not held	
2024	League1 Ontario Championship	10	4–4–10	9th	–	Round of 16	
2025	League1 Ontario Championship	12	6–4–12	10th	–	Round of 32	

=== Women ===
Season	League	Teams	Record	Rank	Playoffs	League Cup	Ref
2021	League1 Ontario Summer Championship	7	2–1–3	4th	–	–	
2022	League1 Ontario	20	4–3–12	16th	Did not qualify	–	
2023	League1 Ontario	19	7–3–8	10th	Did not qualify	–	
2024	League1 Ontario Championship	10	11–3–4	Champions ↑	–	Round of 16	
2025	League1 Ontario Premier	10	4–5–9	6th	–	Round of 16	

== Notable former players ==
The following players have either played at the professional or international level, either before or after playing for the League1 Ontario team:

=== Men ===
- (Canada) Wesley Cain
- (Barbados) (Canada) Zachary Ellis-Hayden
- (Canada) Ricky Gomes
- (Canada) Marko Maletic
- (Canada) Johnny Son
