= 2024 League1 Ontario season (women) =

League1 Ontario
- Season: 2024

The 2024 Women's League1 Ontario season was the ninth of League1 Ontario, a Division 3 women's soccer league in the Canadian soccer league system and the highest level of soccer based in the Canadian province of Ontario. Starting from this season, the league is split into three divisions with promotion and relegation between them.

The Premier division is composed by 10 clubs, the Championship division by 10 clubs, all returning from last season. The League2 Ontario is made up by two conferences containing reserve teams and newly licensed clubs.

== League1 Ontario Premier ==
League1 Ontario Premier
- Season: 2024
- Champions: NDC Ontario
- Relegated: Blue Devils FC
- Matches: 90
- Goals: 270 (3 per match)

League1 Ontario Premier will be composed by 10 teams, all coming back from the 2023 League1 Ontario season. Those clubs have qualified to the Premier division by finishing in the top half of the combined standings of the previous two seasons, with the exception of the Electric City FC, which have folded, being then replaced by the Blue Devils FC.

The 10 teams will face each other twice, once at home and once away and the club at the top of the standings will be crowned as League1 Ontario champions and gain a berth for the League1 Canada Interprovincial championship. The last placed team will be automatically relegated, while the 9th placed club will play a playoff game against the 2nd placed club of the Championship to stay in the league.

=== Clubs ===
League1 Premier
Team	City	Principal stadium	Head coach
Alliance United FC	Markham / Scarborough	Birchmount Stadium / Varsity Stadium / Ontario Soccer Centre	Angelo Cavalluzzo
Blue Devils FC	Oakville	Sheridan Trafalgar Stadium	Natalie Bukovec
FC London	London	Tricar Field	Garrett Peters
Guelph United FC	Guelph	Centennial Bowl	Randy Ribeiro
NDC Ontario	Vaughan		Joey Lombardi
North Mississauga SC	Mississauga	Churchill Meadows (Mattamy Sports Park)	Bijan Azizi
North Toronto Nitros	Toronto	Downsview Park	Billy Wilson
Simcoe County Rovers FC	Barrie	J.C Massie Field, Georgian College	Carli Tingstad
Vaughan Azzurri	Vaughan	North Maple Regional Park	Carmine Isacco
Woodbridge Strikers	Woodbridge (Vaughan)	Vaughan Grove	David Porco

=== Standings ===
Pos	Team	Pld	W	D	L	GF	GA	GD	Pts	Qualification or relegation
1	NDC Ontario (C)	18	15	1	2	47	17	+30	46	Qualification to Inter-Provincial Championship
2	FC London	18	12	2	4	48	19	+29	38	
3	North Toronto Nitros	18	11	3	4	35	20	+15	36	
4	Woodbridge Strikers	18	9	3	6	46	30	+16	30	
5	Vaughan Azzurri	18	6	7	5	23	25	−2	25	
6	Guelph United F.C.	18	7	3	8	35	29	+6	24	
7	Simcoe County Rovers FC	18	5	6	7	24	27	−3	21	
8	Alliance United FC	18	5	4	9	27	38	−11	19	
9	North Mississauga SC (O)	18	3	4	11	22	43	−21	13	Qualification to relegation playoffs
10	Blue Devils FC (R)	18	0	1	17	10	69	−59	1	Relegation to League1 Ontario Championship

Source: League1 Ontario
(C) Champions; (O) Play-off winners; (R) Relegated

=== Promotion/relegation playoffs ===
A playoff was played between the 9th placed team in the Premier and the 2nd placed team in the Championship in a single game for a place in the top tier in 2025.

August 17, 2024	North Mississauga SC (L1O Premier 9th place)	3–1	Scrosoppi FC (L1O Championship 2nd Place)	Vaughan, Ontario
	Archer 6', 66'; Dore-Anderson 30'		Newcombe 63' (pen.)	Stadium: Ontario Soccer Centre; Referee: Najeeb Almasri

=== Statistics ===
As of August 8, 2024

==== Top goalscorers ====
Rank	Player	Club	Goals
1	Samantha Murphy	Woodbridge Strikers	18
2	Jade Kovacevic	North Toronto Nitros	16
3	April Lantaigne	NDC Ontario	11
3	Julia Benati	FC London	11
5	Olivia Rizakos	Guelph United	9
6	Ally Rowe	FC London	9
7	Annabelle Chukwu	NDC Ontario	7
7	Jayda Thompson	Woodbridge Strikers	7
7	Victoria Hinchliffe	Guelph United	7
10	2 players tied		6

Source: League1 Ontario

=== League Honours ===
==== Awards ====
Award	Player	Team	Ref
Most Valuable Player	Samantha Murphy	Woodbridge Strikers	
Young Player of the Year (U20)	Teegan Melenhorst	NDC Ontario	
Coach of the Year	Garrett Peters	FC London	
Goalkeeper of the Year	Noelle Henning	NDC Ontario	
Defender of the Year	Jadea Collin	NDC Ontario	
Midfielder of the Year	Julia Benati	FC London	
Forward of the Year	Samantha Murphy	Woodbridge Strikers	
Golden Boot (Top Scorer)	Samantha Murphy	Woodbridge Strikers	

==== League All-Stars ====
The following players were named League1 Ontario Premier Division All-Stars for the 2024 season:

First Team All-Stars

Player	Position
Noelle Henning (NDC Ontario)	Goalkeeper
Jenny Wolevel (Alliance United)	Defender
Sarah Rollins (North Toronto Nitros)	Defender
Bryanna Caldwell (FC London)	Defender
Jadea Collin (NDC Ontario)	Defender
Julia Benati (FC London)	Midfielder
Brianne Desa (Vaughan Azzurri)	Midfielder
Caitlin Crichton (Guelph United)	Midfielder
Teegan Melenhorst (NDC Ontario)	Midfielder
Jade Kovacevic (North Toronto Nitros)	Forward
Samantha Murphy (Woodbridge Strikers)	Forward

Second Team All-Stars

Player	Position
Mollie Eriksson (North Mississauga)	Goalkeeper
Elise Bell (North Toronto Nitros)	Defender
Abby Wroe (Simcoe County Rovers)	Defender
Quintin Tostevin (North Toronto Nitros)	Defender
Ida Miceli (Woodbridge Strikers)	Defender
Alanna Raimondo (Vaughan Azzurri)	Midfielder
April Syme (Woodbridge Strikers)	Midfielder
Ella Kettles (NDC Ontario)	Midfielder
April Lantaigne (NDC Ontario)	Forward
Annabelle Chukwu (NDC Ontario)	Forward
Ally Rowe (FC London)	Forward

Honourable Mentions

Player	Position
Gurleen Toor (Alliance United)	Goalkeeper
Haley Ward (Guelph United)	Defender
Kathleen Kimens (Vaughan Azzurri)	Defender
Brooke-Lynne Mitchell (Vaughan Azzurri)	Defender
Ava Elgood (Blue Devils)	Defender
Cloey Uddenberg (Simcoe County Rovers)	Midfielder
Ravina Braich (North Mississauga)	Midfielder
Courtney Poon (North Toronto Nitros)	Midfielder
Ava Greco (NDC Ontario)	Midfielder
Olivia Rizakos (Guelph United)	Forward
Aliya Gomes (Simcoe County Rovers)	Forward

== League1 Ontario Championship ==
League1 Ontario Championship
- Season: 2024

League1 Ontario Championship is composed of 10 teams, 8 of those returning from the 2023 League1 Ontario season, Pickering FC who returned from hiatus, and new expansion club Rush Canada SA. Those clubs have qualified for the Championship division by finishing in the bottom half of the combined standings of the previous two seasons of League1 Ontario.

The 10 teams will face each other twice, once at home and once away for a total of 18 games. The club at the top of the standings will be crowned as Championship division winners and will be promoted to the 2025 League1 Ontario Premier. The 2nd ranked team in the standings will face the 9th placed team in the Premier division to gain promotion into the top division for the next season. The team last in the standings will face the winner of the League2 Ontario playoffs winner to stay in the league.

=== Clubs ===
League1 Championship
Team	City	Principal stadium	Head coach
Burlington SC	Burlington	Corpus Christi CSS	Neil Wilson
BVB IA Waterloo	Waterloo	RIM Park	Greg Jespersen
Darby FC	Whitby	South Courtice Field	Stuart Robertson
Hamilton United	Hamilton	Ron Joyce Stadium (McMaster University)	Carmine Lancia
Pickering FC	Pickering	Pickering Soccer Centre/Kinsmen Park	Francesco Carriero
ProStars FC	Brampton	Ontario Soccer Centre / Victoria Park Stadium / Terry Fox Stadium	Marco Bonofiglio
Rush Canada	Oakville	River Oaks Park	Michael Di Blasio
Scrosoppi FC	Milton	Bishop Reding CSS	John Yacou
Tecumseh United FC	Tecumseh	Académie Ste. Cécile International School	Mohammed Nabavieh
Unionville Milliken SC	Unionville (Markham)	Ontario Soccer Centre	Alex Morales

=== Standings ===
Pos	Team	Pld	W	D	L	GF	GA	GD	Pts	Qualification or relegation
1	BVB IA Waterloo (P)	18	11	3	4	36	15	+21	36	Promotion to League1 Ontario Premier
2	Scrosoppi FC	18	10	5	3	37	16	+21	35	Qualification to promotion playoffs
3	Hamilton United	18	9	4	5	32	15	+17	31	
4	ProStars FC	18	9	3	6	31	24	+7	30	
5	Pickering FC	18	6	6	6	26	26	0	24	
6	Unionville Milliken SC	18	6	6	6	24	28	−4	24	
7	Burlington SC	18	4	7	7	23	34	−11	19	
8	Tecumseh United FC	18	4	5	9	14	28	−14	17	
9	Darby FC	18	4	4	10	22	38	−16	16	
10	Rush Canada SA	18	3	5	10	17	38	−21	14	Relegation to League2 Ontario (Note: Rush Canada SA was initially relegated but were readmitted to the Championship division when Vaughan Azzurri B declined their promotion)

Source: League1 Ontario
(P) Promoted

=== Promotion playoffs ===
The two losing semi-finalists of League2 Ontario will face against each others, the winner will be promoted to the Championship for the 2025 season.

=== Statistics ===
As of August 8, 2024

==== Top goalscorers ====
Rank	Player	Club	Goals
1	Abby Kraemer	BVB IA Waterloo	10
1	Sahara Zingano	Scrosoppi FC	10
1	Teagan Handley	ProStars FC	10
4	Torrie Grant-Clavijo	Unionville-Milliken SC	8
5	Aalayah Michline-Simone Lully	Scrosoppi FC	7
5	Mya Newcombe	Scrosoppi FC	7
5	Sophia Cabral	BVB IA Waterloo	7
8	7 players tied		5

Source: League1 Ontario

=== League Honours ===
==== Awards ====
Award	Player	Team	Ref
Most Valuable Player	Danielle Sauve	BVB IA Waterloo	
Young Player of the Year (U20)	Ella Cahill	Scrosoppi FC	
Coach of the Year	Greg Jespersen	BVB IA Waterloo	
Goalkeeper of the Year	Natalie Mouradian	BVB IA Waterloo	
Defender of the Year	Jaiden McBain	BVB IA Waterloo	
Midfielder of the Year	Sahara Zingano	Scrosoppi FC	
Forward of the Year	Jaiden Morgan	Hamilton United	
Golden Boot (Top Scorer)	Teagan Handley; Abby Kraemer; Sahara Zingano	ProStars FC; BVB IA Waterloo; Scrosoppi FC	

==== League All-Stars ====
The following players were named League1 Ontario Championship Division All-Stars for the 2024 season:

First Team All-Stars

Player	Position
Natalie Mouradian (BVB IA Waterloo)	Goalkeeper
Cassandra Campanella (Hamilton United)	Defender
Jaiden McBain (BVB IA Waterloo)	Defender
Evana Eyubeh (Scrosoppi)	Defender
Priyanka Chakravarti (BVB IA Waterloo)	Defender
Taylor Schell (BVB IA Waterloo)	Midfielder
Tori Chia (Darby)	Midfielder
Danielle Sauve (BVB IA Waterloo)	Midfielder
Sahara Zingano (Scrosoppi)	Midfielder
Jaiden Morgan (Hamilton United)	Forward
Ella Cahill (Scrosoppi)	Forward

Second Team All-Stars

Player	Position
Marissa Zucchetto (Unionville Milliken)	Goalkeeper
Caroline Tepelenas (Unionville Milliken)	Defender
Emily Cirone (Darby)	Defender
Erin Hedgecock (Hamilton United)	Defender
Brooke MacLeod (Tecumseh United)	Defender
Mary DiFonzo (Burlington)	Midfielder
Teagan Handley (ProStars)	Midfielder
Brynn Jurus (Hamilton United)	Midfielder
Mackenzie Scott (Pickering)	Forward
Della Weir (Rush Canada)	Forward
Aalayah Lully (Scrosoppi)	Forward

== League2 Ontario ==
League2 Ontario
- Season: 2024

League2 Ontario clubs will be divided in regional conferences. Those clubs will be either the "B" team of Premier and Championship clubs or newly licensed clubs.

All teams will face each other team in their conference twice, once at home and once away. The top two teams in each division will advance to the promotion playoffs, with the winner being promoted to the Championship.

=== Northeast Conference ===
Northeast Conference
Team	City	Principal stadium	Head coach
Alliance United FC B	Markham		Laura Gosse
Darby FC B	Darlington		Fref Chicoy Daban
Master's FA	Scarborough (Toronto)	Alumni Field	Junior Groves
North Mississauga SC B	Mississauga	Churchill Meadows (Mattamy Sports Park)	Laura Arduini
North Toronto Nitros B	North York (Toronto)		Daire O'Brien
Pickering FC B	Pickering		Peter Hogg
Simcoe County Rovers FC B	Barrie		Mallory MacDonald
Unionville Milliken SC B	Unionville (Markham)	Bill Crothers Turf West	Bill Markos
Vaughan Azzurri B	Vaughan		Paul De Abreu
Woodbridge Strikers B	Woodbridge (Vaughan)		Gabe Cremonese

Pos	Team	Pld	W	D	L	GF	GA	GD	Pts	Qualification or relegation
1	Alliance United FC B	14	12	0	2	36	13	+23	36	Qualification to promotion playoffs and L2O finals
2	Vaughan Azzurri B (C)	14	9	3	2	35	15	+20	30	Qualification to promotion playoffs and L2O finals
3	Pickering FC B	14	9	2	3	29	12	+17	29	
4	Simcoe County Rovers FC B	14	9	2	3	31	16	+15	29	
5	North Toronto Nitros B	14	8	1	5	37	17	+20	25	
6	Woodbridge Strikers B	14	5	6	3	31	25	+6	21	
7	North Mississauga SC B	14	6	2	6	22	25	−3	20	
8	Unionville Milliken SC B	14	4	4	6	26	34	−8	16	
9	Darby FC B	14	5	0	9	16	26	−10	15	
10	Master's FA	14	0	2	12	5	43	−38	2	

(C) Champions

=== Southwest Conference ===
Southwest Conference
Team	City	Principal stadium	Head coach
Blue Devils FC B	Oakville	North Park Turf	Natalie Bukovec
Burlington SC B	Burlington	City View Park Centre	Martinho Kibato
BVB IA Waterloo B	Waterloo		Gregory Jespersen
FC London B	London	City Wide Sports Park	Garrett Peters
Guelph United FC B	Guelph		Michael Warden
Hamilton United B	Hamilton		Carmine Lancia
ProStars FC B	Brampton		Josef Komlodi
Rush Canada SA B	Oakville	River Oaks Park	Michael Di Blasio
Scrosoppi FC B	Milton		John Yacou
St. Catharines Roma Wolves	St. Catharines	Brock University	Davide Massafra

Pos	Team	Pld	W	D	L	GF	GA	GD	Pts	Qualification or relegation
1	Hamilton United B	14	9	1	4	28	16	+12	28	Qualification to promotion playoffs and L2O finals
2	BVB IA Waterloo B	14	7	2	5	22	17	+5	23	Qualification to promotion playoffs and L2O finals
3	Blue Devils FC B	14	7	2	5	31	22	+9	23	
4	Rush Canada SA B	14	7	1	6	31	27	+4	22	
5	ProStars FC B	14	6	1	7	22	26	−4	19	
6	St. Catharines Roma Wolves	14	6	0	8	17	34	−17	18	
7	Scrosoppi FC B	14	5	3	6	23	29	−6	18	
8	Burlington SC B	14	3	3	8	20	32	−12	12	
9	FC London B	14	2	4	8	23	24	−1	10	
10	Guelph United FC B	14	1	1	12	9	41	−32	4	

=== Playoffs ===
Semifinals; August 6-7
NE1	Alliance United FC B	3
SW2	BVB IA Waterloo B	0
SW1	Blue Devils FC B	1(3)
NE2	Vaughan Azzurri B	1(4)

Championship Game; August 10
NE1	Alliance United FC B	1
NE2	Vaughan Azzurri B	3

=== Statistics ===
As of September 4, 2024

==== Top goalscorers ====
Rank	Player	Club	Goals
1	(Canada) Emilija Lucic	Vaughan Azzurri B	12
2	(Canada) Nyema Prentice-Whyte	Woodbridge Strikers B	11
3	(Canada) Sage Thomas-Roberts	ProStars FC B	10
4	(Canada) Naomi Atem	Alliance United FC B	9
5	(Canada) Jada Arthurs	Simcoe County Rovers FC B	8
5	(Canada) Jessica Giordanella	Alliance United FC B	8
5	(Canada) Sienna Caesar	Burlington SC B	8
8	(Canada) Ines Delhomelle	Unionville Milliken SC B	7
8	(Canada) Sydney Sica	St. Catharines Roma Wolves	7
10	(Canada) Ashley Greco	North Toronto Nitros B	6
10	(Canada) Jessica Breda	Vaughan Azzurri B	6
10	(Canada) Katelyn Yip	North Toronto Nitros B	6
10	(Canada) Olivia Crombie	Pickering FC B	6

Source: League1 Ontario

=== League Honours ===
==== Awards ====
Award	Northeast Division	Southwest Division	Ref
Most Valuable Player	Nyema Prentice-Whyte (Woodbridge Strikers B)	Astrid Hancocks (Blue Devils B)	
Coach of the Year	Laura Gosse (Alliance United B)	Pat Thomson (Blue Devils B)	
Goalkeeper of the Year	Ava Perrone (Vaughan Azzurri B)	Astrid Hancocks (Blue Devils B)	
Defender of the Year	Vanessa Dias (Vaughan Azzurri B)	Lorena Morcone (Hamilton United B)	
Midfielder of the Year	Ashley Greco (North Toronto Nitros B)	Nicole Astaiza (FC London B)	
Forward of the Year	Nyema Prentice-Whyte (Woodbridge Strikers B)	Sage Thomas-Roberts (ProStars B)	
Golden Boot (Top Scorer)	Emilija Lucic (Vaughan Azzurri B)	Sage Thomas-Roberts (ProStars B)	

== L1 Cup ==
The L1 Cup is a league cup tournament that will be contested by teams from all three tiers of League1 Ontario. The Cup will be returning after a five-season hiatus, having last been played in 2018.

All 22 "A" teams will participate in the five-round knockout competition, which will be played concurrently with the league season. Twelve clubs will enter the first round (all ten clubs from the Championship division, and the two A teams from League2), while all ten clubs from the Premier Division will get a bye to the round of 16. The first round is scheduled to begin on the week of April 15.

=== Bracket ===
- First Round
- April 17–21

- Round of 16
- May 14–29

- Quarterfinals
- June 5–26

- Semifinals
- July 16–17

- Final
- July 31

L1OP
Woodbridge Strikers
1(5)

L1OC
Pickering FC
1(4)

L1OC
Pickering FC
2(4)

L1OC
Hamilton United
2(3)

L1OP
Woodbridge Strikers
0

L1OP
North Toronto Nitros
2

L1OP
North Toronto Nitros
1

L1OP
Alliance United FC
0

L1OP
North Toronto Nitros
9

L1OC
Darby FC
1

L1OP
Vaughan Azzurri
4

L1OC
Rush Canada SA
1

L2O
Masters FA
0

L1OC
Rush Canada SA
5

L1OP
Vaughan Azzurri
0

L1OC
Darby FC
1

L1OP
North Mississauga SC
0

L1OC
Darby FC
2

L1OC
Darby FC
2

L1OC
Unionville Milliken SC
0

L1OP
North Toronto Nitros
1

L1OP
FC London
2

L1OP
FC London
4

L1OC
BVB IA Waterloo
0

L1OC
BVB IA Waterloo
3

L1OC
ProStars FC
0

L1OP
FC London
4

L1OP
Guelph United FC
1

L1OP
Guelph United FC
1

L1OP
NDC Ontario
0

L1OP
FC London
2

L1OP
Simcoe County Rovers
0

L1OP
Simcoe County Rovers
5

L2O
St. Catharines Roma Wolves
0

L2O
St. Catharines Roma Wolves
w/o

L1OC
Tecumseh United FC

L1OP
Simcoe County Rovers
3

L1OC
Scrosoppi FC
0

L1OP
Blue Devils FC
2

L1OC
Scrosoppi FC
6

L1OC
Scrosoppi FC
4

L1OC
Burlington SC
0

== U20 Reserve Division ==
The league will continue to operate a reserve division (however, unlike previous years where there were both U19 and U21 divisions, there will be a single U20 division).

Pos	Team	Pld	W	D	L	GF	GA	GD	Pts	
1	ProStars FC U20 (C)	12	8	3	1	29	7	+22	27	Qualification to playoffs
2	Whitecaps London SC U20	12	7	4	1	28	10	+18	25	Qualification to playoffs
3	North Toronto Nitros U20	12	6	4	2	18	9	+9	22	Qualification to playoffs
4	Alliance United FC U20	12	6	3	3	17	10	+7	21	Qualification to playoffs
5	FC Durham U20	12	6	3	3	22	18	+4	21	
6	Blue Devils FC U20	12	5	2	5	13	16	−3	17	
7	Unionville Milliken SC U20	12	4	2	6	11	22	−11	14	
8	Aurora FC U20	12	4	1	7	13	17	−4	13	
9	North Mississauga SC U20	12	4	1	7	11	18	−7	13	
10	Cambridge United U20	12	3	1	8	12	33	−21	10	
11	Hamilton United U20	12	0	2	10	9	23	−14	2	

Source: League1 Ontario
(C) Champions

=== Playoffs ===
Semifinals; July 30
1	ProStars FC U20	2
4	Alliance United FC U20	1
2	Whitecaps London SC U20	2
3	North Toronto Nitros U20	1

Championship Game; August 3
1	ProStars FC U20	4
2	Whitecaps London SC U20	1
