= Jacob Cabral =

Canadian soccer player

Personal information
- Date of birth: July 27, 2005 (age 21)
- Place of birth: Mississauga, Ontario, Canada
- Height: 5 ft 9 in (1.75 m)
- Position: Midfielder

Team information
- Current team: Inter Toronto FC II

Youth career
- ProStars FC

College career
Years	Team	Apps	(Gls)
2023–	Guelph Gryphons	36	(1)

Senior career*
Years	Team	Apps	(Gls)
2022–2023	ProStars FC	6	(0)
2024	Guelph United FC	17	(1)
2025	Scrosoppi FC	18	(2)
2026–	Inter Toronto FC II	5	(0)
2026–	→ Inter Toronto FC (loan)	1	(0)
- * Club domestic league appearances and goals as of May 29, 2026

Jacob Cabral (born July 27, 2005) is a Canadian soccer player who plays as a midfielder for Inter Toronto FC II in the Ontario Premier League 2.

== University career ==
In 2023, Cabral began attending the University of Guelph, where he played for the men's soccer team. At the end of his first season, he was named to the U Sports All-Rookie Team. In 2024, he was named an OUA West Second Team All-Star.

== Club career ==
In 2022 and 2023, Cabral played with ProStars FC in League1 Ontario.

In December 2023, he signed with Guelph United FC in League1 Ontario for the 2024 season.

In 2025, he joined Scrosoppi FC, where he was named the league's Young (U20) Player of the Year. He was initially set to return to the club for the 2026 season.

In 2026, he began playing with Inter Toronto FC II in the Ontario Premier League. In April 2026, he joined the Inter Toronto FC first team in the Canadian Premier League on a short-term replacement player contract. On April 11, 2026, he made his professional debut against the HFX Wanderers. In late May, he signed another short-term contract.

== Career statistics ==
As of match played May 31, 2026

Club statistics
Club	Season	League			Playoffs		Domestic Cup		League Cup		Other		Total	
Club	Season	Division	Apps	Goals	Apps	Goals	Apps	Goals	Apps	Goals	Apps	Goals	Apps	Goals
ProStars FC	2022	League1 Ontario	1	0	0	0	—		—		—		1	0
ProStars FC	2023	League1 Ontario	5	0	—		—		—		—		5	0
ProStars FC	Total		6	0	0	0	0	0	0	0	0	0	6	0
Guelph United FC	2024	League1 Ontario Premier	17	1	—		—		2	0	1 (Note: Appearance in Promotion/Relegation playoffs)	0	20	1
Scrosoppi FC	2025	League1 Ontario Premier	18	2	—		0	0	1	0	—		19	2
Inter Toronto II	2026	Ontario Premier League 2	5	0	—		—		0	0	—		5	0
Inter Toronto FC (loan)	2026	Canadian Premier League	1	0	0	0	0	0	—		—		1	0
Career total			47	3	0	0	0	0	1	0	1	0	49	3
