= Elise Bell =

Canadian soccer player (born 2005)

Personal information
- Full name: Elise Amelie Marie Bell
- Date of birth: June 26, 2005 (age 21)
- Place of birth: Toronto, Ontario, Canada
- Height: 5 ft 7 in (1.70 m)
- Position: Defender

Team information
- Current team: Ottawa Rapid FC

Youth career
- Toronto High Park FC
- SC Toronto
- North Toronto Nitros

College career
Years	Team	Apps	(Gls)
2023–2025	Guelph Gryphons	27	(2)

Senior career*
Years	Team	Apps	(Gls)
2022–2025	North Toronto Nitros	49	(18)
2024–2025	→ North Toronto Nitros B	2	(0)
2026	Guelph United FC	8	(7)
2026	→ Simcoe County Rovers FC (loan)	0	(0)
2026–	Ottawa Rapid FC	6	(2)
- * Club domestic league appearances and goals as of October 30, 2026

Elise Amelie Marie Bell (born June 26, 2005) is a Canadian soccer player who plays for Northern Super League club Ottawa Rapid FC.

== Early life ==
Bell played youth soccer with Toronto High Park FC, SC Toronto, and the North Toronto Nitros.

== University career ==
In 2023, Bell began attending the University of Guelph, where she played for the women's soccer team. In 2024, she was named an OUA West First-Team All-Star and a U Sports Second Team All-Canadian. In 2025, she was again named an OUA West First-Team All-Star and a U Sports Second Team All-Canadian.

== Club career ==
In 2022, Bell began playing at the senior level with the North Toronto Nitros in League1 Ontario. In 2024, she was named a league Second Team All-Star. In 2025, she was named the league's Young Player of the Year, Defender of the Year, and a league First Team All-Star.

In 2026, she joined Guelph United FC in the Ontario Premier League. After the end of the OPL season, she joined the Simcoe County Rovers ahead of their 2026–27 W Canadian Championship match against Northern Super League side Montreal Roses FC.

In August 2026, she signed with Northern Super League club Ottawa Rapid FC for the remainder of the season. On August 22, 2026, she scored her first goal, in her debut, in a 5-1 loss to Vancouver Rise FC.

== Career statistics ==
As of October 30, 2026

Appearances and goals by club, season and competition
Club	Season	League			Playoffs		National cup		League cup		Total	
Club	Season	Division	Apps	Goals	Apps	Goals	Apps	Goals	Apps	Goals	Apps	Goals
North Toronto Nitros	2022	League1 Ontario	5	0	—		—		—		5	0
North Toronto Nitros	2023	League1 Ontario	9	5	0	0	—		—		9	5
North Toronto Nitros	2024	League1 Ontario Premier	18	3	—		—		4	1	22	4
North Toronto Nitros	2025	League1 Ontario Premier	17	10	—		—		3	2	19	12
North Toronto Nitros	Total		49	18	0	0	0	0	7	3	56	21
North Toronto Nitros B	2024	League2 Ontario	1	0	—		—		—		1	0
North Toronto Nitros B	2025	League2 Ontario	1	0	—		—		—		1	0
North Toronto Nitros B	Total		2	0	0	0	0	0	0	0	2	0
Guelph United FC	2026	Ontario Premier League 1	8	7	—		—		1	2	9	9
Simcoe County Rovers FC (loan)	2026	Ontario Premier League 1	0	0	—		1	0	0	0	1	0
Ottawa Rapid FC	2026	Northern Super League	6	2	0	0	0	0	—		6	2
Career total			65	27	0	0	1	0	8	5	74	32
