= Sudbury Cyclones =

Sudbury Cyclones may refer to:

- Sudbury Cyclones (1976–1980), a Canadian soccer team that competed in the National Soccer League from 1976 to 1980
- Sudbury Cyclones (2024), a Canadian soccer team that competes in League1 Ontario
