= Cambridge F.C. =

Cambridge F.C. may refer to:

- Cambridge United F.C., a professional football club from England in League One
  - Cambridge United W.F.C., their women's team
- Cambridge United, a semi-professional team from Canada
- Cambridge City F.C., a semi-professional football club from England in the regional Isthmian League
- Cambridge FC, a semi-professional football club from New Zealand
- Cambridge F.C. (Glasgow), a 19th-century football club in the 1885–86 Scottish Cup

== See also ==
- Cambridge University A.F.C., football club
- Cambridge University R.U.F.C., rugby club
