= Colin Gander =

Canadian soccer player (born 2000)

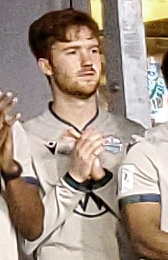

Personal information
- Date of birth: January 12, 2000 (age 26)
- Place of birth: Kitchener, Ontario, Canada
- Height: 6 ft 0 in (1.83 m)
- Position: Defender

Youth career
- 2009–2013: Kitchener SC
- 2013–2019: Toronto FC

College career
Years	Team	Apps	(Gls)
2019	Missouri State Bears	0	(0)
2020–2022	Guelph Gryphons	27	(5)
2023–2024	TMU Bold	24	(0)

Senior career*
Years	Team	Apps	(Gls)
2017–2018	Toronto FC III	4	(0)
2021	Guelph United FC	4	(1)
2022	HFX Wanderers	15	(0)
2023–2024	Guelph United FC	29	(5)
2025	Cambridge United	6	(1)
2026–	Mustangs Football Club	5	(9)
- * Club domestic league appearances and goals as of August 24, 2026

Colin Gander (born January 12, 2000) is a Canadian soccer player who plays as a defender for Cambridge United.

== Early life ==
In his youth, Gander played youth soccer with Kitchener SC, later joining the Toronto FC Academy.

== College/University career ==
In 2019, Gander began attending Missouri State University, where he joined the men's soccer team, although he redshirted the 2019-20 Missouri Valley Conference season.

In 2020, Gander transferred to the University of Guelph joining the men's soccer team. However, his inaugural season was delayed until the 2021-22 school year, as the season was cancelled due to the COVID-19 pandemic. He scored his first goal on October 22, against the Brock Badgers. In the 2021–22 season, he won the OUA title.

In 2023, Gander began his MBA at the Toronto Metropolitan University joining the men's soccer team.

== Club career ==
In 2017 and 2018, he played with Toronto FC III in League1 Ontario.

In 2020, he trained with Toronto Skillz FC.

In 2021, he played with Guelph United F.C.

At the 2022 CPL-U Sports Draft, Gander was selected in the second round (eleventh overall) by the HFX Wanderers. In April 2022, he signed a developmental contract with the Wanderers, which allows him to maintain his university eligibility. He made his debut on April 16, coming on as a substitute against Atlético Ottawa. In mid-August, as part of his developmental contract, he departed the team to return to play for his university.

In 2023, he returned to Guelph United FC. He then re-signed with the team for the 2024 season.

== Career statistics ==
As of match played August 11, 2024

Club	Season	League			Playoffs		National Cup		Other		Total	
Club	Season	Division	Apps	Goals	Apps	Goals	Apps	Goals	Apps	Goals	Apps	Goals
Toronto FC III	2017	League1 Ontario	1	0	0	0	—		0	0	1	0
Toronto FC III	2018	League1 Ontario	3	0	—		—		0	0	3	0
Toronto FC III	Total		4	0	0	0	0	0	0	0	4	0
Guelph United FC	2021	League1 Ontario	4	1	0	0	—		—		4	1
HFX Wanderers FC	2022	Canadian Premier League	15	0	—		2	0	—		17	0
Guelph United FC	2023	League1 Ontario	16	4	1	0	—		—		17	4
Guelph United FC	2024	League1 Ontario Premier	13	1	—		—		1	0	14	1
Guelph United FC	Total		29	5	1	0	0	0	1	0	31	5
Career total			52	6	1	0	2	0	1	0	56	6
