= Maletić =

Maletić (Serbian: Малетић) is a surname. Notable people with the surname include:

- Darko Maletić (born 1980), Bosnia and Herzegovina footballer
- Đorđe Maletić (1816-1888), Serbian writer
- Ivana Maletić (born 1973), Croatian politician
- Marko Maletić (footballer, born 1993), Bosnian-Herzegovinian footballer
- Marko Maletic (soccer, born 1999), Canadian soccer player
- Sanja Maletić (born 1973), Serbian singer
- Stefan Maletić (born 1987), Dutch footballer
