= Marko Maletic =

Marko Maletic may refer to:

- Marko Maletić (footballer, born 1993), Bosnian-Herzegovinian footballer
- Marko Maletic (soccer, born 1999), Canadian soccer player
