= Guelph United FC =

Semi-professional soccer club based in Guelph, Ontario

- Full name: Guelph United Football Club
- Founded: 2020
- Stadium: Centennial Bowl
- Capacity: 500
- Owners: Keith Mason, Benny Mezezi, and Ami Mezezi
- Head Coach: General Manager; Paul Martin; Head Coach (M); Alan Kotch; Head Coach (W); Michael Warden
- League: Ontario Premier League
- 2025: L1O-C, 11th (men); L1O-P, 4th (women)
- Website: https://www.guelphunitedfc.ca/
Home colours	Away colours

Guelph United Football Club is a Canadian semi-professional soccer club based in Guelph, Ontario. The club includes men's and women's teams that play in the Ontario Premier League. Both teams initially played at the University of Guelph's Alumni Stadium, but moved to Centennial Bowl in 2023. The women's team was originally named Guelph Union before changing to match the men's team's name for the 2024 season, following their merger in January 2023.

== History ==
Both the men's (Guelph United) and women's (then known as Guelph Union) teams were formed in 2020, joining League1 Ontario in 2021, initially under separate ownership groups, with both being affiliated with the Guelph Soccer Club. In January 2023, the club's merged under the same ownership group with Guelph United acquiring the Union, in a move to optimize operations and strengthen ties with the community. After continuing to play under the Union name for the 2023 season, the women's team rebranded to Guelph United ahead of 2024.

=== Men ===
University of Guelph Gryphons and Guelph SC

Guelph United FC was founded in 2020 by Keith Mason, Benny Mezezi, and Ami Mezezi, in partnership with the University of Guelph Gryphons, the Guelph Soccer Club, and the City of Guelph with the goal of bringing semi-professional soccer to the community. Guelph Gryphons head and assistant coaches Keith Mason and Justin Springer were announced as the team's associate coaches. The team is expected to be primarily composed of University of Guelph players, supplemented by local players.

The club joined League1 Ontario for the 2021 season and will also field a team in the reserve division. Ahead of their debut, they made headlines signing former Canadian Premier League player Jace Kotsopoulos as the team's first ever player. They made their debut on July 30, 2021, defeating FC London by a score of 6–0. In their first season, they came in first place in the West Division, advancing to the playoffs, with their team featuring three of the top four regular season goal scoring leaders. In the playoffs, they won the League1 Ontario title, after defeating Blue Devils FC 3–1 in the finals, qualifying them for the 2022 Canadian Championship. They were defeated in the first round of the Canadian Championship by professional club HFX Wanderers FC of the Canadian Premier League 2–0.

=== Women ===
Guelph Union logo

Guelph Union was founded by the Guelph Soccer Club to join the League1 Ontario women's division for the 2021 season. They became the city's first ever women's semi-professional sports team. The women's team initially existed as a separate entity from the men's team, although they merged into one entity (while retaining the Union name for the women's team for 2023, before switching to United in 2024) in January 2023, as the women's team was potentially going to leave the city, as they would not be returning under the Guelph SC banner. Prior to this the Guelph Soccer Club had fielded four teams in the Ontario Women's Soccer League. They made their debut in the 2021 Summer Championship season on July 22, 2021, defeating Darby FC 1–0. The club partnered with the Children's Foundation of Guelph and Wellington as their charitable partner, donating fifty percent of the revenue from their ticket sales to the organization. In their debut season, they participated in the short-season Summer Championship division, finishing with a perfect 6–0 record to win the division. In 2022, they began playing in the main division (after opting to play in the short-season division in 2021 due to the COVID-19 pandemic), winning their debut match 1–0 over Darby FC. They finished their inaugural season in the main division in 13th place. For the 2024 season, the Union rebranded to United to match the men's side.

== Players and staff ==
=== Coaching staff ===
As of October 30, 2026

Name	Position
Paul Martin	General Manager
(South Africa) Alan Kotch	Men's Head Coach
(Canada) Michael Warden	Women's Head Coach
(Canada) Sebastian Sgarbossa	Goalkeeper Coach

== Seasons ==
=== Men ===
Season	League	Teams	Record	Rank	Playoffs	League Cup	Canadian Championship	Ref
2021	League1 Ontario	15	10–0–2	1st, West (2nd overall)	Champions	–	Not Eligible	
2022	League1 Ontario	22	13–3–5	7th	Did not qualify	–	Preliminary Round	
2023	League1 Ontario	21	11–6–3	6th	Quarter-finals	–	Did not qualify	
2024	League1 Ontario Premier	12	4–4–14	11th ↓	–	Quarter-finals	Did not qualify	
2025	League1 Ontario Championship	12	5–7–10	11th	–	Round of 32	Did not qualify	

=== Women ===
Season	League	Teams	Record	Rank	Playoffs	League Cup	Ref
2021	League1 Ontario Summer Championship	7	6–0–0	Champions	–	–	
2022	League1 Ontario	20	7–9–3	13th	did not qualify	–	
2023	League1 Ontario	19	7–3–8	12th	did not qualify	–	
2024	League1 Ontario Premier	10	7–3–8	6th	–	Quarter-finals	
2025	League1 Ontario Premier	10	9–2–7	4th	–	Round of 16	

== Notable former players ==
The following players have either played at the professional or international level, either before or after playing for the League1 Ontario team:

=== Men ===
- (Canada) Jacob Cabral
- (Canada) Wesley Cain
- (Barbados) Zachary Ellis-Hayden
- (Canada) (Colombia) Nicolás Galvis
- (Canada) Colin Gander
- (Canada) Luke Green
- (Canada) Jace Kotsopoulos
- (Canada) Marko Maletic
- (Canada) Tomasz Skublak
- (Saint Kitts and Nevis) Justin Springer
- (Canada) Camilo Vasconcelos
- (Canada) Marcel Zajac

=== Women ===
- (Canada) Elise Bell
- (Canada) Caitlin Crichton
- (Guyana) Justine Rodrigues
- (Saint Kitts and Nevis) Cloey Uddenberg
