= Sudbury Cyclones (2024) =

Soccer club in Sudbury, Ontario

- Founded: 2023
- Stadium: James Jerome Sports Complex
- Owner: Sudbury Wolves Sports and Entertainment
- Head Coach: Giuseppe Politi
- League: Ontario Premier League
- 2025: L1O-C, 2nd - promoted (men); L2O, 8th (women)
- Website: https://sudburycyclones.ca/
Home colours

Sudbury Cyclones is a Canadian soccer club based in Sudbury, Ontario that competes in the men's top division of the Ontario Premier League and the women's division of Ontario Premier League 3.

== History ==
In August 2023, it was announced that they would join League2 Ontario, the third tier of League1 Ontario, as an expansion club for the 2024 season. The team is owned by Sudbury Wolves Sports and Entertainment, who also own Ontario Hockey League club Sudbury Wolves, National Basketball League team Sudbury Five, and Northern Football Conference team Sudbury Spartans. The club's name comes from the first iteration of the Sudbury Cyclones, who competed in the National Soccer League from 1976 to 1980. The team will initially field a men's team and develop an academy with U14, U16, U18 boys and girls teams, as well as a U19 men's team to play in the reserve division. The academy officially launched in December 2023. The club hopes to add a semi-professional women's team in the future. James Jerome Field will serve as the team's home field. Dayna Corelli, a former Team Ontario player, was appointed as the first general manager of the team, along with Connor Vande Waghe being appointed as the sporting director.

The club unveiled their logo and team colours in January 2024. The team colours of blue, green, and grey were chosen to represent the water and lakes around Sudbury (blue), the forestry around Sudbury (green), and the Big Nickel (grey). Their first match occurred on April 20, in a league cup match against League1 Ontario Championship side FC London, where they were defeated 1–0 at home, in front of an estimated crowd of 500-600 fans. On May 4, 2024, they played their first league match, recording their first ever victory with a 4–0 victory over Alliance United B. In their first season, they finished with a 10-2-2 record, finishing third in the Northeast division, just missing out on the promotion playoffs.

Ahead of the 2025 season, they were promoted to the League1 Ontario Championship, following Vaughan Azzurri B and Alliance United B declined their promotions. In addition, they announced that they would add a women's team to League2 Ontario for the 2025 season.

The Cyclones team won yet another back-to-back promotion in 2025, where they will be playing in the top division of the Ontario Premier League for 2026.

== Seasons ==
=== Men ===
Season	League	Teams	Record	Rank	Playoffs	League Cup	Ref
2024	League2 Ontario; Northeast Conference	8	10–2–2	3rd ↑ (Note: Sudbury was initially not promoted. However, they were selected to be promoted, after other clubs declined promotion)	–	Round of 32	
2025	League1 Ontario Championship	12	12–7–8	2nd ↑	–	Round of 32	

=== Women ===
Season	League	Teams	Record	Rank	Playoffs	League Cup	Ref
2025	League2 Ontario Northeast	12	7–0–7	8th	–	Round of 32	
