= Tomasz Skublak =

Canadian soccer player (born 1997)

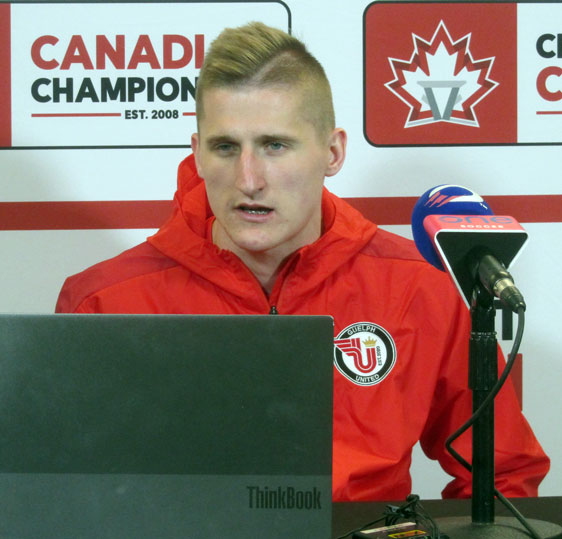
- Skublak in 2022

Personal information
- Full name: Tomasz Noah Skublak
- Date of birth: December 8, 1997 (age 28)
- Place of birth: Hamilton, Ontario, Canada
- Height: 1.88 m (6 ft 2 in)
- Position: Forward

Team information
- Current team: Inter Toronto FC
- Number: 77

Youth career
- Saltfleet SC

College career
| Years | Team | Apps | (Gls) |
| 2015–2016 | Guelph Gryphons | 29 | (14) |
| 2017–2018 | South Florida Bulls | 31 | (10) |

Senior career*
| Years | Team | Apps | (Gls) |
| 2017 | K-W United | 2 | (1) |
| 2017–2018 | Vaughan Azzurri | 12 | (6) |
| 2019 | HFX Wanderers | 21 | (1) |
| 2020 | FC Lori | | |
| 2020 | Brandenburg 03 | 5 | (3) |
| 2021–2022 | Guelph United | 20 | (15) |
| 2022 | FC Berlin | 7 | (6) |
| 2023–2025 | Scrosoppi FC | 47 | (44) |
| 2026– | Inter Toronto FC | 23 | (8) |
- * Club domestic league appearances and goals as of August 31, 2026

Tomasz Noah Skublak (born December 8, 1997) is a Canadian soccer player of Polish descent who plays as a forward for Inter Toronto FC in the Canadian Premier League.

== University career ==
In 2015 and 2016, Skublak attended the University of Guelph, playing for the men's soccer team.

In 2017, he transferred to American school University of South Florida to play for the men's soccer team. In his senior season in 2018, Skublak was an American Athletic Conference All-Academic Team, USF Athletics Honor Roll, United Soccer Coaches NCAA Div. I Men's Soccer Third Team All-Region, United Soccer Coaches Second Team Scholar All-American, First Team All-American Athletic Conference, and a two-time American Athletic Conference Offensive Player of the Week.

== Club career ==
In 2017, Skublak joined K-W United in the Premier Development League. He scored his first goal on June 28 against the West Virginia Chaos.

In 2017 and 2018, Skublak spent summers playing with League1 Ontario side Vaughan Azzurri. In 2017, he scored four goals in nine appearances and then scored another two goals in three appearances in 2018.

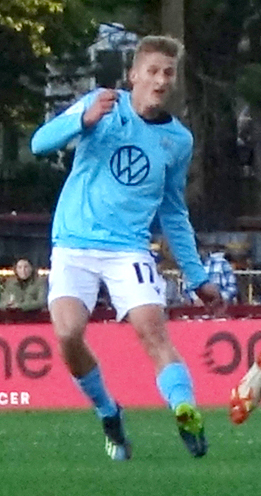
Skublak playing for the HFX Wanderers in 2019

Ahead of the 2019 season, he went on trial with Canadian Premier League club York9 FC, but ultimately did not sign with the club. In April 2019, Skublak signed his first professional contract with another Canadian Premier League side, HFX Wanderers. After the season, it was announced that Skublak would not be returning for the 2020 season.

In March 2020, he signed with Armenian club Lori FC.

In September 2020, Skublak signed with German Berlin-Liga side Brandenburg 03. He made his league debut on September 19, 2020 against Füchse Berlin Reinickendorf.

In May 2021, Skublak returned to Canada, signing with League1 Ontario side Guelph United.

In the 2022 Fall season, he joined United Premier Soccer League club FC Berlin.

In January 2023, he signed with Scrosoppi FC of League1 Ontario. That season, he finish as the league's top scorer and was named League MVP, Forward of the Year, and named a league First Team All-Star. In 2023, he helped Scrosoppi earn the regular season title, before being defeated in the playoff final by Simcoe County Rovers, and in 2024, he helped them capture the league title winning the regular season (no playoffs in 2024), scoring a brace in the title-clinching match. In 2024, he was named league MVP and a First Team All-Star. In 2025, he was once again named a First Team All-Star.

In February 2026, he signed with Inter Toronto FC in the Canadian Premier League. On April 25, he scored his first goal, in a 1-1 draw against Cavalry FC. On May 1, 2026, he scored a brace against Atlético Ottawa, in a 4-1 victory, going viral after pulling out his real estate business card out of his sock and making a "Call me" gesture, referencing his off-field career, following his first goal of the match.

== Personal life ==
In addition to his soccer career, Skublak also works as a real estate agent.

== Career statistics ==
As of December 31, 2025

Appearances and goals by club, season and competition
| Club | Season | League | | | Playoffs | | National cup (Note: Includes appearances in the Canadian Championship.) | | League cup | | Total | |
| Club | Season | Division | Apps | Goals | Apps | Goals | Apps | Goals | Apps | Goals | Apps | Goals |
|---|---|---|---|---|---|---|---|---|---|---|---|---|
| K-W United | 2017 | Premier Development League | 2 | 1 | 0 | 0 | — | | — | | 2 | 1 |
| Vaughan Azzurri | 2017 | League1 Ontario | 9 | 4 | 0 | 0 | — | | — | | 9 | 4 |
| Vaughan Azzurri | 2018 | League1 Ontario | 3 | 2 | 0 | 0 | — | | — | | 3 | 2 |
| Vaughan Azzurri | Total | | 12 | 6 | 0 | 0 | 0 | 0 | 0 | 0 | 12 | 6 |
| HFX Wanderers | 2019 | Canadian Premier League | 21 | 1 | — | | 4 | 3 | — | | 25 | 4 |
| Brandenburg 03 | 2020–21 | Berlin-Liga | 5 | 3 | — | | — | | — | | 5 | 3 |
| Guelph United | 2021 | League1 Ontario | 11 | 10 | 2 | 1 | — | | — | | 13 | 11 |
| Guelph United | 2022 | League1 Ontario | 9 | 5 | — | | 1 | 0 | — | | 10 | 5 |
| Guelph United | Total | | 20 | 15 | 2 | 1 | 1 | 0 | 0 | 0 | 23 | 16 |
| FC Berlin | 2022 | United Premier Soccer League | 7 | 6 | — | | — | | — | | 7 | 6 |
| Scrosoppi FC | 2023 | League1 Ontario | 15 | 23 | 2 | 1 | — | | — | | 17 | 24 |
| Scrosoppi FC | 2024 | League1 Ontario Premier | 18 | 12 | — | | — | | 1 | 0 | 19 | 12 |
| Scrosoppi FC | 2025 | League1 Ontario Premier | 14 | 9 | — | | — | | 1 | 0 | 15 | 9 |
| Scrosoppi FC | Total | | 47 | 44 | 2 | 1 | 0 | 0 | 2 | 0 | 51 | 45 |
| Career total | | | 114 | 76 | 4 | 2 | 5 | 3 | 2 | 0 | 125 | 81 |
