= Anthony Di Biase =

Canadian soccer player (born 1988)

Personal information
- Full name: Anthony Di Biase
- Date of birth: April 26, 1988 (age 38)
- Place of birth: Richmond Hill, Ontario, Canada
- Height: 5 ft 10 in (1.78 m)
- Position: Defender

Youth career
- 2006: Virginia Intermont Cobras
- 2007: Niagara Purple Eagles

Senior career*
Years	Team	Apps	(Gls)
2007	Ottawa Fury	9	(1)
2008	Olympic Charleroi	2	(0)
2009	Forest City London	16	(1)
2010	Harrisburg City Islanders	8	(0)
2011	Hamilton Rage	13	(0)
2012	Ottawa Fury	14	(0)
2012	SC Toronto	6	(2)

International career
2005	Canada U-20	4	(0)
2011	2011 Summer Universiade	5	(0)
- * Club domestic league appearances and goals

Anthony Di Biase (born April 26, 1988) is a Canadian soccer player. He played the majority of his career in North America in the USL Second Division, USL Premier Development League, and the Canadian Soccer League.

== Career ==
=== College and amateur ===
Di Biase played college soccer at Virginia Intermont College, playing 20 games in his freshman season, before transferring to Niagara University as a sophomore. He played 19 games in the Metro Atlantic Athletic Conference for the Niagara Purple Eagles before turning professional.

=== Professional ===
Di Biase left college early to joan Belgian club Olympic Charleroi in the summer of 2007. He played a year with the team before returning to Canada at the end of the season. He played with Ottawa Fury in 2008, and joined USL Premier Development League expansion side Forest City London, in 2009 was named to the PDL All-Central-Conference team at the end of the season.

Di Biase signed with the Harrisburg City Islanders of the USL Second Division in 2010, and played 8 games for the team, before being released at the end of the season. Having been unable to secure a professional contract elsewhere, Di Biase returned to Canada and signed with the expansion Hamilton Rage in the USL Premier Development League for 2011. After the 2011 season, Di Biase went on trial with FC Edmonton in the NASL and with Finland 1st Division side Oulun Palloseura before once again returning to play for the Ottawa Fury in 2012. He played 14 regular season games while adding 2 assists on the year. Di Biase would help Ottawa reach the Elite 8 in the USL Premier Development League before losing to the Carolina Dynamo.

In late August 2012, Di Biase signed with SC Toronto in the Canadian Soccer League first division. He made his first appearance on August 24, 2012, against the York Region Shooters. He would score his first goal for the club on September 2, 2012, in a 6–1 victory over Brantford Galaxy. He helped Toronto secure a postseason berth by finishing third in the overall standings. He featured in the playoff quarterfinal match against the Serbian White Eagles, but lost the match to a score of 1–0.

=== International ===
Di Biase toured with the Canada U-20 team in 2005, and played four matches at the 2005 Canada Summer Games in Regina, Saskatchewan, winning a gold medal.

Named to the 2011 Summer Universiade roster for Canada.

== Honours ==
- Gold Medal at 2005 Canada Games with Ontario
- 2009 All-MAAC Preseason First Team
- 2008 All-MAAC Second Team
