= Jevontae Layne =

Canadian soccer player (born 2001)

Personal information
- Date of birth: September 21, 2001 (age 25)
- Place of birth: Brampton, Ontario, Canada
- Height: 6 ft 2 in (1.88 m)
- Position: Forward

College career
Years	Team	Apps	(Gls)
2019–2021	Sheridan Bruins	15	(22)
2024	TMU Bold	11	(10)

Senior career*
Years	Team	Apps	(Gls)
2021	ProStars FC	7	(7)
2022	Scrosoppi FC	15	(11)
2023–2024	Simcoe County Rovers	39	(24)
2025	Valour FC	11	(0)
2026	Treaty United	8	(0)
- * Club domestic league appearances and goals as of July 27, 2026

Jevontae Layne (born September 21, 2001) is a Canadian soccer player.

== Collegiate career ==
In 2019, Layne began attending Sheridan College, where he played for the men's soccer team. At the end of his first season in 2019, he was the OCAA West Division leading scorer and named an OCAA West Second Team All-Star. At the end of his second season in 2021 (the 2020 season was cancelled due to the COVID-19 pandemic), he was named the OCAA Men's Soccer Player of the Year, OCAA Men's Soccer South Division Player of the Year, OCAA Men's Soccer South Division Scoring Champion, and named an OCAA Men's Soccer South Division All-Star, and a CCAA Men's Soccer All-Canadian.

In 2024, Layne began attending Toronto Metropolitan University, where he played for the men's soccer team. He made his debut on September 8 against the Toronto Varsity Blues. On September 28, he scored a hat trick in a 3-0 victory over the Carleton Ravens. He scored a pair of braces on October 5 against the Queen's Golden Gaels and on October 13 against the Nipissing Lakers. After scoring 10 goals in 11 matches in 2024, he was named an OUA East Second Team All-Star.

== Club career ==
In 2021, Layne played with ProStars FC in League1 Ontario. In 2022, he joined Scrosoppi FC. In 2023, he joined Simcoe County Rovers FC. In the championship final, he scored two goals in their victory over Scrosoppi FC to help Simcoe County win the 2023 title. After the 2023 season, he was named to a league Second Team All-Star and subsequently re-signed with the club for the 2024 season. At the end of the 2024 season, he was named the league Forward of the Year and named a First Team All-Star.

At the 2025 CPL-U Sports Draft, Layne was selected first overall by Valour FC. In March 2025, he signed a U Sports contract, which allows him to maintain his university eligibility, with the club. He made his debut on April 5, 2025, against Pacific FC. He scored his first goal in the second leg of the 2025 Canadian Championship quarter-finals against Major League Soccer side Vancouver Whitecaps FC. In August 2025, he extended his U Sports contract through the remainder of the season.

In February 2026, he signed with League of Ireland Premier Division club Treaty United.

== Career statistics ==
As of June 5, 2026

Club	Season	League			Playoffs		Domestic Cup		League Cup		Total	
Club	Season	Division	Apps	Goals	Apps	Goals	Apps	Goals	Apps	Goals	Apps	Goals
ProStars FC	2021	League1 Ontario	7	7	–		–		–		7	7
Scrosoppi FC	2022	League1 Ontario	15	11	–		–		–		15	11
Simcoe County Rovers	2023	League1 Ontario	18	11	2	3	–		–		20	14
Simcoe County Rovers	2024	League1 Ontario Premier	21	13	–		1	0	4	3	26	16
Simcoe County Rovers	Total		39	24	2	3	1	0	4	3	46	30
Valour FC	2025	Canadian Premier League	11	0	–		3	1	–		14	1
Treaty United	2026	League of Ireland Premier Division	5	0	–		0	0	–		5	0
Career total			77	42	2	3	4	1	4	3	87	49
