= Rush Canada SA =

Soccer club in Oakville, Ontario

Rush Canada
- Full name: Rush Canada Soccer Academy
- Stadium: River Oaks Park
- Owner: Rush Soccer
- Head Coach: Slobodan Pavlovic (men); Michael Di Blasio (women)
- League: League1 Ontario
- 2025: L2O Central, 2nd (men); L1O-C, 8th (women)
- Website: www.rushcanada.com

Rush Canada Soccer Academy is a Canadian soccer club based in Oakville, Ontario, that competes in the men's and women's divisions of League1 Ontario. The men play in the third tier League2 Ontario, while the women play in the second tier League1 Ontario Championship.

== History ==
Rush Canada was founded in 2014, as a division of Rush Soccer (which was founded in 1997 with the Colorado Rush). Rush Soccer is the largest soccer organization in the world. In 2021, they began participating in the League1 Ontario U19 and U21 reserve divisions. In 2023, they won the U19 men's summer reserve division title and the U19 women's fall reserve division title. In September 2023, it was announced that they would join League2 Ontario, the third tier of League1 Ontario, as an official license holder. In February 2024, it was announced that the women would debut in the second tier League1 Ontario Championship, following St. Catharines Roma Wolves's decision to self-relegate. Their inaugural matches occurred on April 21 in League cup action, with the women's team defeating Master's FA 5–0, while the men fell to Burlington SC 2–0.

== Seasons ==
=== Men ===
Season	League	Teams	Record	Rank	Playoffs	League Cup	Ref
2024	League2 Ontario; Southwest Conference	8	10–0–4	2nd	–	Round of 32	
2025	League2 Ontario; Central Conference	8	7–4–3	2nd	–	Round of 32	

=== Women ===
Season	League	Teams	Record	Rank	Playoffs	League Cup	Ref
2024	League1 Ontario Championship	10	3–5–10	10th (Note: Rush Canada was initially relegated to League2 Ontario for 2025, however, they were spared relegation when the promoted teams declined their promotion)	–	Round of 16	
2025	League1 Ontario Championship	9	3–6–7	8th	–	Round of 16	
