= Tecumseh United FC =

Soccer club in Tecumseh, Ontario

- Full name: Tecumseh United Football Club
- Founded: 1999
- Stadium: University of Windsor Stadium, Windsor, Ontario
- Capacity: 2000
- President: Settimo Tocco
- Head Coach: Daniel Mendonca
- League: League1 Ontario
- 2025: L1O-C, 6th
- Website: https://www.tecumsehunitedfc.com/

Tecumseh United Football Club is a Canadian soccer club based in Tecumseh, Ontario, just east of Windsor, that competes in the women's division of League1 Ontario. The club rebranded it's competitive teams to its current name from Tecumseh SC in 2024.

== History ==
Tecumseh SC logo

Tecumseh SC was founded in 1999 through the merger of the Tecumseh Soccer Club and the North Shore Soccer Club that existed within Tecumseh, bringing together the competitive and recreational programs. In 2009, Tecumseh Soccer Club, separated from the recreational program and now concentrates on the competitive program only. The club obtained an OPDL license in 2017 and a National Youth License in 2019.

In 2020, the club fielded a team in the League1 Ontario Women's U21 reserve division, but the season was cancelled due to the COVID-19 pandemic. This was one of their two U21 teams, supplemented by their large OPDL player pool.

In 2021, the club joined League1 Ontario, fielding a team in the Women's Division, where they will play out of the University of Windsor Stadium. While not an official member of the men's division, they fielded teams in the men's reserve divisions in 2021. In 2022, they struck an affiliation with local club Whitecaps London SC to allow Whitecaps London players to progress to the Tecumseh League1 Ontario women's team. In 2024, they rebranded their teams as Tecumseh United FC and updated their logo.

== Seasons ==
Women

Season	League	Teams	Record	Rank	Playoffs	League Cup	Ref
2021	League1 Ontario	7	2–1–9	7th	Did not qualify	–	
2022	League1 Ontario	20	7–4–8	12th	Did not qualify	–	
2023	League1 Ontario	19	4–2–12	17th	Did not qualify	–	
2024	League1 Ontario Championship	10	4–5–9	8th	–	Round of 32	
2025	League1 Ontario Championship	9	7–3–6	6th	–	Round of 16	
