= Scrosoppi FC =

Canadian soccer team

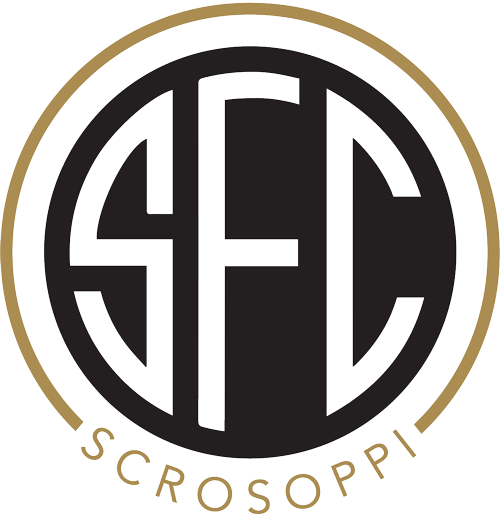
- Full name: Scrosoppi Football Club
- Founded: 2020; 6 years ago
- Stadium: Bishop Reding CSS
- President: Gary Raulino
- Head Coach: Patrice Gheisar
- League: Ontario Premier League
- 2025: L1O-P: 2nd (men); L1O-C, 1st - promoted (women)
- Website: https://www.scrosoppifc.ca/

Scrosoppi Football Club is a Canadian semi-professional soccer club based in Milton, Ontario, that plays in the Ontario Premier League. The club is named after St. Luigi Scrosoppi, who is the patron saint of soccer players.

== History ==
Original club logo from 2021–2022

The club was founded in 2020, partnering with youth soccer clubs Milton Youth SC and Brampton SC. (As of 2023, neither club appears to be a partner club of Scrosoppi.) The name was chosen in honour of St. Luigi Scrosoppi, who is the patron saint of soccer players.

The club joined League1 Ontario for the 2021 season. Their home field in their inaugural season is Bishop Reding Catholic Secondary School in Milton. They finished their inaugural season in fourth place in the Western Conference and also recorded their largest victory in team history that season, when they defeated Sigma FC by a score of 10-1.

In July 2022, Scrosoppi owner Gary Raulino purchased Portuguese fourth division club SC Vianense of the Campeonato de Portugal, bringing the club into their player pathway program, with the two teams set to serve as 'twin clubs'.

After two mid-table seasons, in 2023, Scrosoppi FC rapidly ascended to the top of the table in 2023, securing top division status upon the league's division split into two tiers ahead of the 2024 season. They finished the 2023 season as regular season champions, but fell to the Simcoe County Rovers in the playoff championship final. In December 2023, they added a female team in the League1 Ontario women's Championship division for the 2024 season.

In 2024, the men's team won the League1 Ontario title and qualified for the 2025 Canadian Championship, while the second team earned promotion to the second tier League1 Championship for 2025 through the promotion playoffs. However, the second team chose to decline the promotion to remain in League2 Ontario for 2025. After finishing as finalists in 2024, the first team won the L1O League Cup for the first time in 2025, while also finishing second in league play.

In their debut season in 2024, the women's team finished in second place in the second tier Championship, but were defeated in the promotion playoffs by North Mississauga SC. The following season in 2025, they won the Championship division, earning promotion to the Premier division for 2026.

== Seasons ==
=== Men ===
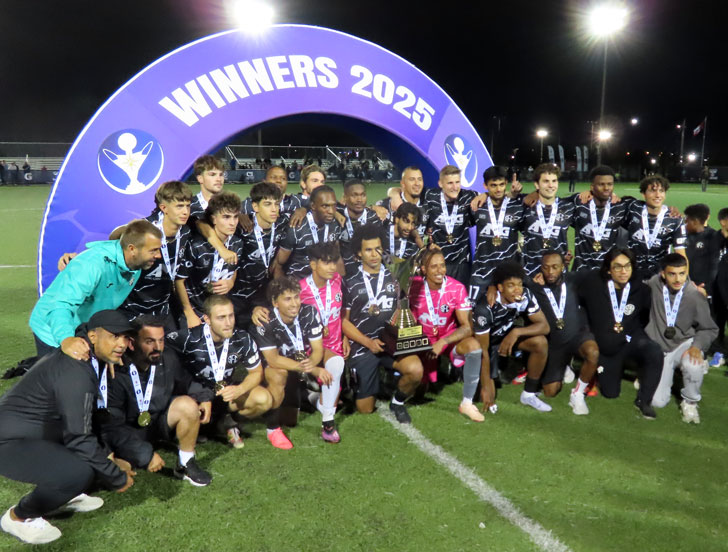
Scrosoppi FC celebrate 2025 League1 Ontario Cup title

Season	League	Teams	Record	Rank	Playoffs	League Cup	Ref
2021	League1 Ontario	15	6–1–5	4th, West (6th overall)	did not qualify	not held	
2022	League1 Ontario	22	9–1–11	12th	did not qualify	Not held	
2023	League1 Ontario	21	17–0–3	1st	Runner-up	Not held	
2024	League1 Ontario Premier	12	16–5–1	Champions	Not held	Round of 16	
2025	League1 Ontario Premier	11	12–5–3	2nd	Not held	Champions	

=== Women ===
Season	League	Teams	Record	Rank	Playoffs	League Cup	Ref
2024	League1 Ontario Championship	10	10–5–3	2nd	–	Quarter-finals	
2025	League1 Ontario Championship	9	9–3–4	Champions ↑	–	Round of 32	

== Notable former players ==
The following players have either played at the professional or international level, either before or after playing for the League1 Ontario team:

- (Canada) Jacob Carlos
- (Canada) Victor Gallo
- (Guyana) Javier George
- (Canada) Ijah Halley
- (Canada) Ryan James
- (Guyana) (Canada) Daniel Jodah
- (Canada) Maksym Kowal
- (Canada) Jevontae Layne
- (Saint Vincent and the Grenadines) Tristan Marshall
- (Canada) Kyle Porter
- (Canada) Cyrus Rollocks
- (Canada) Tomasz Skublak
- (Estonia) (Canada) Andreas Vaikla
- (Ethiopia) (El Salvador) (Canada) Marcus Velado-Tsegaye
- (Canada) David Velastegui
- (Canada) Jordan Wilson
