= 2025 League1 Ontario season (women) =

League1 Ontario
- Season: 2025

The 2025 Women's League1 Ontario season is the tenth of League1 Ontario, a Division 3 women's soccer league in the Canadian soccer league system and the highest level of soccer based in the Canadian province of Ontario. The league is split into three divisions with promotion and relegation between them.

The Premier division is composed by 10 clubs, the Championship division by 9 clubs, all returning from last season. The League2 Ontario is made up by two conferences containing reserve teams and newly licensed clubs.

== League1 Ontario Premier ==
League1 Ontario Premier
- Season: 2025
- Dates: April 16 – August 4

League1 Ontario Premier will be composed by 10 teams. NDC Ontario are the defending champions and Waterloo United (re-branded from BVB IA Waterloo) is new to the division after earning promotion from the Championship Division.

The 10 teams will face each other twice, once at home and once away and the club at the top of the standings will be crowned as League1 Ontario champions and gain a berth for the League1 Canada Interprovincial championship. The last placed team will be automatically relegated, while the 9th placed club will play a playoff game against the 2nd placed club of the Championship to stay in the league.

=== Clubs ===
League1 Premier
Team	City	Principal stadium	Head coach
Alliance United FC	Markham / Scarborough	Varsity Stadium	Angelo Cavalluzzo
FC London	London	Tricar Field	Diogo Marinho
Guelph United FC	Guelph	Centennial Bowl	Randy Ribeiro
NDC Ontario	Vaughan	Ontario Soccer Centre	Mel Bigg
North Mississauga SC	Mississauga	Churchill Meadows (Mattamy Sports Park)	Adrian Field
North Toronto Nitros	Toronto	Downsview Park	Marc Maunder
Simcoe County Rovers FC	Barrie	J.C Massie Field, Georgian College	Zack Wilson
Vaughan Azzurri	Vaughan	North Maple Regional Park	Jorden Feliciano
Waterloo United	Waterloo	RIM Park	Gregory Jespersen
Woodbridge Strikers	Woodbridge (Vaughan)	Vaughan Grove	Gabe Cremonese

=== Standings ===
Pos	Team	Pld	W	D	L	GF	GA	GD	Pts	Qualification or relegation
1	Simcoe County Rovers FC (C)	18	14	3	1	47	13	+34	45	2025 Inter-Provincial Championship
2	North Toronto Nitros	18	13	3	2	56	13	+43	42	
3	NDC Ontario	18	13	2	3	44	14	+30	41	
4	Guelph United F.C.	18	9	2	7	35	32	+3	29	
5	Vaughan Azzurri	18	8	2	8	19	28	−9	26	
6	Waterloo United	18	4	5	9	15	26	−11	17	
7	Woodbridge Strikers	18	4	4	10	21	42	−21	16	
8	North Mississauga SC	18	3	4	11	10	48	−38	13	
9	FC London (O)	18	3	4	11	14	30	−16	13	Qualification to relegation playoffs
10	Alliance United FC (R)	18	1	7	10	14	29	−15	10	Relegation to Ontario Premier League 2

Source: League1 Ontario
(C) Champions; (O) Play-off winners; (R) Relegated

=== Promotion/relegation playoffs ===
A playoff was played between the 9th placed team in the Premier and the 2nd placed team in the Championship in a single game for a place in the top tier in 2026.

August 8, 2025	FC London (L1O Premier 9th place)	1–1 (2–0 p)	Hamilton United (L1O Championship 2nd Place)	London, Ontario
8:30 pm	Kohut 90+5'	Report	Lecky 77' (pen.)	Stadium: Tricar Field; Referee: Petros Vasilos
	Penalties
	Marra (penalty scored); Kohut (penalty scored); Oweissi (penalty missed)		Lecky (penalty missed); Machado (penalty missed); Kraemer (penalty missed); Campanella (penalty missed)

=== Statistics ===
==== Top goalscorers ====
Rank	Player	Club	Goals
1	Alliyah Rowe	Simcoe County Rovers FC	24
2	Olivia Brown	Guelph United FC	20
3	Ashley Campbell	North Toronto Nitros	14
4	Elise Bell	North Toronto Nitros	10
4	Nia Fleming-Thompson	Vaughan Azzurri	10
4	Zoe Rowe	Guelph United FC	10
7	Melisa Kekic	NDC Ontario	8
7	Stefanie Young	Simcoe County Rovers FC	8
9	Lauren Rowe	North Toronto Nitros	7
10	3 players tied		5

Source: League1 Ontario

=== League Honours ===
==== Awards ====
Award	Player	Team	Ref
Most Valuable Player	Alliyah Rowe	Simcoe County Rovers FC	
Young Player of the Year (U20)	Elise Bell	North Toronto Nitros	
Coach of the Year	Zach Wilson	Simcoe County Rovers FC	
Goalkeeper of the Year	Samantha St. Croix	FC London	
Defender of the Year	Elise Bell	North Toronto Nitros	
Midfielder of the Year	Emma Reda	NDC Ontario	
Forward of the Year	Alliyah Rowe	Simcoe County Rovers FC	
Golden Boot (Top Scorer)	Alliyah Rowe	Simcoe County Rovers FC	

==== League All-Stars ====
The following players were named League1 Ontario Premier Division All-Stars for the 2025 season:

First Team All-Stars

Player	Position
Samantha St. Croix (FC London)	Goalkeeper
Ida Miceli (Woodbridge Strikers)	Defender
Bryanna Caldwell (Simcoe County Rovers)	Defender
Hannah Chown (Alliance United)	Defender
Elise Bell (North Toronto Nitros)	Defender
Stefani Young (Simcoe County Rovers)	Midfielder
Emma Reda (NDC Ontario)	Midfielder
Olivia Rizakos (Guelph United)	Midfielder
Ashley Campbell (North Toronto Nitros)	Forward
Olivia Brown (Guelph United)	Forward
Alliyah Rowe (Simcoe County Rovers)	Forward

Second Team All-Stars

Player	Position
Claire Wyville (Waterloo United)	Goalkeeper
Trinity Esprit (North Toronto Nitros)	Defender
Abby Wroe (Simcoe County Rovers)	Defender
Kathleen Kiemens (Vaughan Azzurri)	Defender
Reese Fowler (North Mississauga SC)	Defender
Olivia Chisholm (NDC Ontario)	Midfielder
Teagan Handley (Simcoe County Rovers)	Midfielder
Anaya Johnson (North Toronto Nitros)	Midfielder
Olivia Bizzoni (Woodbridge Strikers)	Midfielder
Melisa Kekic (NDC Ontario)	Forward
Nia Fleming-Thompson (Vaughan Azzurri)	Forward

== League1 Ontario Championship ==
League1 Ontario Championship
- Season: 2025
- Dates: April 20 – August 3

League1 Ontario Championship is composed of 9 teams, 8 of those returning from the 2023 League1 Ontario season. Oakville SC (re-branded from Blue Devils FC) joins the division after being relegated from the Premier Division. Whitby FC re-branded from Darby FC. ProStars FC withdrew from the league shortly before the schedules released and were not replaced.

The winner of the division will be automatically promoted to the Premier Division for 2026, while the runner-up will face the 9th place club in the Premier Division in the promotion playoffs. There will be no relegation this season.

=== Clubs ===
League1 Championship
Team	City	Principal stadium	Head coach
Burlington SC	Burlington	Corpus Christi CSS	Neil Wilson
Hamilton United	Hamilton	Ron Joyce Stadium (McMaster University)	Carmine Lancia
Oakville SC	Oakville	Bronte Athletic Park	Garrett Peters
Pickering FC	Pickering	Pickering Soccer Centre/Kinsmen Park	Peter Hogg
Rush Canada	Oakville	River Oaks Park	Michael Di Blasio
Scrosoppi FC	Milton	Bishop Reding CSS	John Yacou
Tecumseh United FC	Tecumseh	Académie Ste. Cécile International School	James Lambourne
Unionville Milliken SC	Unionville (Markham)	Ontario Soccer Centre	Alex Morales
Whitby FC	Whitby	Telus Dome	Rich Hirst

=== Standings ===
Pos	Team	Pld	W	D	L	GF	GA	GD	Pts	Qualification or relegation
1	Scrosoppi FC (C, P)	16	9	3	4	30	18	+12	30	Promotion to Ontario Premier League 1
2	Hamilton United	16	9	2	5	28	18	+10	29	Qualification to promotion playoffs
3	Oakville SC	16	8	2	6	22	14	+8	26	
4	Pickering FC	16	7	4	5	32	21	+11	25	
5	Whitby FC	16	6	7	3	23	14	+9	25	
6	Tecumseh United FC	16	7	3	6	21	23	−2	24	
7	Unionville Milliken SC	16	4	4	8	28	36	−8	16	
8	Rush Canada SA	16	3	6	7	27	39	−12	15	
9	Burlington SC	16	3	1	12	18	46	−28	10	

Source: League1 Ontario
(C) Champions; (P) Promoted

=== Statistics ===
==== Top goalscorers ====
Rank	Player	Club	Goals
1	Caitlyn Gratton	Rush Canada SA	11
2	Jahkaya Davis	Scrosoppi FC	8
2	Yasmin Castillo	Scrosoppi FC	8
4	Chiara Nicolazzo	Hamilton United	7
4	Naya Cardoza	Pickering FC	7
6	Ines Delhomelle	Unionville Milliken SC	6
6	Miya Grant-Clavijo	Unionville Milliken SC	6
8	6 players tied		5

Source: League1 Ontario

=== League Honours ===
==== Awards ====
Award	Player	Team	Ref
Most Valuable Player	Yasmin Castillo	Scrosoppi FC	
Young Player of the Year (U20)	Chiara Nicolazzo	Hamilton United	
Coach of the Year	John Yacou	Scrosoppi FC	
Goalkeeper of the Year	Madeleine Boucher	Hamilton United	
Defender of the Year	Emily Cirone	Whitby FC	
Midfielder of the Year	Tori Chia	Whitby FC	
Forward of the Year	Jahkaya Davis	Scrosoppi FC	
Golden Boot (Top Scorer)	Caitlyn Gratton	Rush Canada SA	

==== League All-Stars ====
The following players were named League1 Ontario Championship Division All-Stars for the 2025 season:

First Team All-Stars

Player	Position
Madeleine Boucher (Hamilton United)	Goalkeeper
Tierra Bennett (Scrosoppi)	Defender
Emily Cirone (Whitby)	Defender
Jaya Lecky (Hamilton United)	Defender
Abi Russell (Oakville)	Defender
Tori Chia (Whitby)	Midfielder
Brianne Desa (Pickering)	Midfielder
Yasmin Castillo (Scrosoppi)	Midfielder
Ella Cahill (Scrosoppi)	Forward
Jahkaya Davis (Scrosoppi)	Forward
Sophie Saville (Whitby)	Forward

Second Team All-Stars

Player	Position
Jana Febbraro (Burlington)	Goalkeeper
Alexis Gordon (Unionville Milliken)	Defender
Evana Eyubeh (Scrosoppi)	Defender
Brooke-Lynne Mitchell (Pickering)	Defender
Megan Austin (Oakville SC)	Defender
Ava Ticconi (Rush Canada)	Midfielder
Tara Sisic (Unionville Milliken)	Midfielder
Brynn Jurus (Hamilton United)	Midfielder
Isabella Mazzaferro (Rush Canada)	Forward
Savannah Baillargeon (Tecumseh United)	Forward
Chiara Nicolazzo (Hamilton United)	Forward

== League2 Ontario ==
League2 Ontario
- Season: 2025
- Dates: April 20 – July 31

League2 Ontario clubs will be divided in regional conferences. Those clubs will be either the "B" team of Premier and Championship clubs or newly licensed clubs. Sudbury Cyclones, Railway City FC and Cambridge United joined as new clubs.

All teams will face each other team in their conference twice, once at home and once away. The top two teams in each division will advance to the promotion playoffs, with the winner being promoted to the Championship. If the winner of the playoffs is a B team, they may decline promotion, and instead the top two A teams with the most regular-season points in the division will meet in a playoff to earn promotion.

=== Northeast Conference ===
Pos	Team	Pld	W	D	L	GF	GA	GD	Pts	Qualification or relegation
1	Woodbridge Strikers B (C)	14	11	1	2	40	11	+29	34	Qualification to L2O finals
2	Alliance United FC B	14	9	1	4	24	15	+9	28	Qualification to L2O finals
3	Pickering FC B	14	8	2	4	29	16	+13	26	
4	Scrosoppi FC B	14	7	3	4	30	15	+15	24	
5	North Toronto Nitros B	14	7	3	4	30	25	+5	24	
6	Simcoe County Rovers FC B	14	7	2	5	36	23	+13	23	
7	Whitby FC B	14	7	1	6	18	17	+1	22	
8	Sudbury Cyclones	14	7	0	7	30	32	−2	21	
9	Vaughan Azzurri B	14	6	1	7	29	25	+4	19	
10	Unionville Milliken SC B	14	3	1	10	11	43	−32	10	
11	North Mississauga SC B	14	2	1	11	10	30	−20	7	
12	Master's FA	14	1	2	11	8	43	−35	5	

Updated to match(es) played on July 27, 2025. Source:
(C) Champions

=== Southwest Conference ===
Pos	Team	Pld	W	D	L	GF	GA	GD	Pts	Qualification or relegation
1	Waterloo United B	14	12	1	1	46	13	+33	37	Qualification to L2O finals
2	Railway City FC	14	11	2	1	39	7	+32	35	Qualification to L2O finals
3	Cambridge United (P)	14	8	1	5	36	27	+9	25	
4	FC London B	14	6	4	4	26	22	+4	22	
5	St. Catharines Roma Wolves	14	6	3	5	22	16	+6	21	
6	Oakville SC B	14	4	5	5	26	32	−6	17	
7	Hamilton United B	14	4	4	6	26	24	+2	16	
8	Rush Canada SA B	14	4	3	7	24	35	−11	15	
9	Guelph United FC B	14	1	3	10	10	28	−18	6	
10	Burlington SC B	14	0	2	12	12	63	−51	2	

(P) Promoted

=== Playoffs ===
Semifinals; July 29
NE1	Woodbridge Strikers B	2
SW2	Railway City FC	1
SW1	Waterloo United B	4
NE2	Alliance United FC B	0

Championship Game; August 3
NE1	Woodbridge Strikers B	4
SW1	Waterloo United B	0

=== Promotion/relegation playoffs ===
Woodbridge Strikers B declined the promotion spot to the League1 Ontario Championship. As such, per league rules, a promotion playoff match was scheduled between the two A teams with the most points during the regular season to replace them.

August 10, 2025	Railway City FC	1–2	Cambridge United	St. Thomas, Ontario
4:00 pm	Lievano 5'	Report	Kraja 25', 79'	Stadium: 1Password Park; Referee: Michael Pesce

=== Statistics ===
==== Top goalscorers ====
Rank	Player	Club	Goals
1	(Canada) Cassidy Brooks	Sudbury Cyclones	12
1	(Canada) Sophia Lezizidis	Railway City FC	12
3	(Canada) Aya Naamani	Waterloo United B	10
3	(Canada) Megan Voutour	Cambridge United	10
5	(Canada) Alessia Di Nino	Hamilton United B	9
5	(Canada) Taryn Buckley	Waterloo United B	9
5	(Canada) Taylor Fazzari	Pickering FC B	9
8	(Canada) Jenna Parris	St. Catharines Roma Wolves	8
8	(Canada) Julia Ritchie	FC London B	8
10	5 players tied		7

Source: League1 Ontario

=== League Honours ===
==== Awards ====
Award	Northeast Division	Southwest Division	Ref
Most Valuable Player	Selena Lancaster (Vaughan Azzurri B)	Emma Fluit (Railway City FC)	
Coach of the Year	Paul DeAbreu (Vaughan Azzurri B)	Greg Jespersen (Waterloo United B)	
Goalkeeper of the Year	Vanessa Smith (Woodbridge Strikers B)	Shae Mitchell (Cambridge United)	
Defender of the Year	Selena Lancaster (Vaughan Azzurri B)	Emma Fluit (Railway City FC)	
Midfielder of the Year	Alexa Shwery (Simcoe County Rovers B)	Rebecca Draeger (Waterloo United B)	
Forward of the Year	Cassidy Brooks (Sudbury Cyclones)	Sophia Lezizidis (Railway City FC)	
Golden Boot (Top Scorer)	Cassidy Brooks (Sudbury Cyclones)	Sophia Lezizidis (Railway City FC)	

==== League All-Stars ====
The following players were named League2 Ontario First Team All-Stars for the 2025 season:

Northeast Division

Player	Position
Vanessa Smith (Woodbridge Strikers B)	Goalkeeper
Angela Asante (Master's FA)	Defender
Elizabeth McConnell (Pickering FC B)	Defender
Selena Lancaster (Vaughan Azzurri B)	Defender
Jade Arruda (Woodbridge Strikers B)	Defender
Tamara Lisser (Woodbridge Strikers B)	Midfielder
Alexa Shwery (Simcoe County Rovers B)	Midfielder
Sydney Atwell (Simcoe County Rovers B)	Midfielder
Maja Cenanovic (Woodbridge Strikers B)	Midfielder
Cassidy Brooks (Sudbury Cyclones)	Forward
Isabella Torelli (Vaughan Azzurri B)	Forward

Central Division

Player	Position
Shae Mitchell (Cambridge United)	Goalkeeper
Nadine Hadzic (FC London B)	Defender
Shalagh Guha (Waterloo United B)	Defender
Emma Fluit (Railway City FC)	Defender
Megan Heyes (Cambridge United)	Defender
Faith Garcia (Oakville SC B)	Midfielder
Rebecca Draeger (Waterloo United B)	Midfielder
Raquelle Mitchell (Railway City FC B)	Midfielder
Aya Naamani (Waterloo United B)	Forward
Sophia Lezizidis (Railway City FC)	Forward
Jenna Parris (St. Catharines Roma)	Forward

== L1 Cup ==
The L1 Cup is a league cup tournament that was contested by A teams from all three tiers of League1 Ontario.

All "A" teams participated in the five-round knockout competition, which was played concurrently with the league season. Eighteen clubs entered the first round (five clubs from the Premier Division, all ten clubs from the Championship division, and the three A teams from League2), while seven clubs from the Premier Division received a bye to the round of 16.

=== Bracket ===
- First Round
- April 6–12

- Round of 16
- May 12–21

- Quarterfinals
- June 17–19

- Semifinals
- July 3

- Final
- July 30

L1OP
Vaughan Azzurri
2

L1OC
Tecumseh United FC
0

L1OC
Tecumseh United FC
1

L1OC
Hamilton United
0

L1OP
Vaughan Azzurri
1

L1OP
FC London
2

L1OP
FC London
3

L1OC
Rush Canada SA
0

L1OC
Rush Canada SA
5

L2O
Sudbury Cyclones
0

L1OP
FC London
0

L1OP
Alliance United FC
3

L1OP
NDC Ontario
2

L1OC
Oakville SC
0

L1OC
Oakville SC
2

L1OC
Burlington SC
1

L1OP
NDC Ontario
1

L1OP
Alliance United FC
3

L1OP
Alliance United FC
1

L1OP
Guelph United FC
0

L1OP
Guelph United FC
1

L2O
Railway City FC
0

L1OP
Alliance United FC
1

L1OP
North Toronto Nitros
5

L1OP
North Mississauga SC
2

L2O
St. Catharines Roma Wolves
1

L1OC
Unionville Milliken SC
2

L2O
St. Catharines Roma Wolves
4

L1OP
North Mississauga SC
1

L1OP
North Toronto Nitros
3

L1OP
North Toronto Nitros
4

L1OP
Waterloo United
1

L1OP
Waterloo United
1

L2O
Cambridge United
0

L1OP
North Toronto Nitros
0(4)

L1OP
Simcoe County Rovers
0(2)

L1OP
Simcoe County Rovers FC
1

L1OC
Pickering FC
0

L1OC
Scrosoppi FC
0

L1OC
Pickering FC
4

L1OP
Simcoe County Rovers
3

L1OC
Whitby FC
0

L1OP
Woodbridge Strikers
1(1)

L1OC
Whitby FC
1(4)

L1OC
Whitby FC
3

L2O
Masters FA
0

== U20 Reserve Division ==
The league will continue to operate a reserve division.

=== Northeast Conference ===
Pos	Team	Pld	W	D	L	GF	GA	GD	Pts	Qualification or relegation
1	North Toronto Nitros U20	14	11	2	1	48	13	+35	35	Qualification to playoffs
2	Woodbridge Strikers U20 (C)	14	10	3	1	44	14	+30	33	Qualification to playoffs
3	Oakville SC U20	14	7	3	4	34	19	+15	24	
4	Simcoe County Rovers FC U20	14	6	1	7	16	29	−13	19	
5	Aurora FC U20	14	4	4	6	10	25	−15	16	
6	North Mississauga SC U20	14	4	3	7	20	26	−6	15	
7	Whitby FC U20	14	3	4	7	13	26	−13	13	
8	Pickering FC U20	14	0	2	12	9	42	−33	2	

(C) Champions

=== Southwest Conference ===
Pos	Team	Pld	W	D	L	GF	GA	GD	Pts	Qualification or relegation
1	Hamilton United U20	12	8	2	2	29	8	+21	26	Qualification to playoffs
2	Burlington SC U20	12	8	1	3	30	14	+16	25	Qualification to playoffs
3	Guelph United FC U20	12	6	5	1	28	13	+15	23	
4	Railway City FC U20	12	7	1	4	32	21	+11	22	
5	FC London U20	12	3	2	7	17	30	−13	11	
6	Cambridge United U20	12	2	1	9	11	37	−26	7	
7	St. Catharines Roma Wolves U20	12	2	0	10	18	42	−24	6	

=== Playoffs ===
Semifinals; July 27–28
NE1	North Toronto Nitros U20	2
SW2	Burlington SC U20	1
SW1	Hamilton United U20	0
NE2	Woodbridge Strikers U20	5

Championship Game; August 2
NE1	North Toronto Nitros U20	0
NE2	Woodbridge Strikers U20	2
