= Wesley Cain =

Canadian soccer player

Personal information
- Full name: Wesley Vincent Cain
- Date of birth: 21 February 1994 (age 32)
- Place of birth: Hamilton, Ontario, Canada
- Position: Midfielder

Team information
- Current team: Waterloo United

Youth career
- Guelph SC

College career
Years	Team	Apps	(Gls)
2012	UNOH Racers	18	(10)
2013–2015	Wright State Raiders	61	(4)

Senior career*
Years	Team	Apps	(Gls)
2010	Portugal FC II		
2011	Vancouver Whitecaps Residency		
2014–2017	K–W United FC	43	(7)
2017	SC Waterloo Region		
2017–2018	Hawke's Bay United	17	(2)
2018	Napier City Rovers	18	(8)
2019–2020	Tomasovia Tomaszów Lubelski	13	(8)
2020–2021	Hetman Zamość	15	(1)
2022	BVB IA Waterloo	19	(10)
2023	North Mississauga SC	8	(2)
2023	Guelph United F.C.	10	(0)
2024–	Waterloo United (Note: BVB IA Waterloo changed its name to Waterloo United in 2025)	27	(13)

International career
2011	Canada U17	5	(1)
- * Club domestic league appearances and goals as of August 27, 2025

Wesley Cain (born February 21, 1994) is a Canadian soccer player who plays as a forward for Waterloo United in League1 Ontario.

== Club career ==
=== Youth career ===
Cain played at the junior level with the local side Guelph Royals in the 2005 Ajax Canadian Cup tournament where he recorded a goal against Toronto Eagles in a consolation final. In 2007, he participated in the U-13 Hamilton Festitalia tournament where the Royals successfully claimed the tournament and throughout the season he recorded 10 goals. He was selected to represent Team Ontario at the National All-Star Championship tournament in 2008 where Ontario would win the silver medal. Cain would also finish the tournament as the top goal scorer in the U-14 division. In 2009, he played at the high school level with the Centennial's senior soccer team.

=== Early career ===
In the summer of 2010, he played in the Canadian Soccer League's reserve division with Portugal FC's reserve team. In his debut season in the inter-provincial circuit, he finished as the division's top goal scorer with 7 goals. The following season he was signed to the Vancouver Whitecaps Residency team that competed in the American-based USL Premier Development League.

In 2012, he began playing at the college level with the University of Northwestern Ohio's athletic team. For the 2013 season, he was transferred to play with Wright State University's soccer program. Throughout his stint with the Raiders, he was selected to the Horizon League's All-Tournament Team in 2015.

During the university offseason, he returned to the summer-based PDL to play with K–W United FC. Cain would re-sign with Kitchener for the 2015 season where he helped the team secure a playoff berth. In the conference final he contributed a goal against the Michigan Bucks that helped advance the club to the next round. Ultimately, the club reached the championship final successfully defeating the New York Red Bulls U-23 for the title. He returned for the 2016 season.

His final season with the Kitchener-based team was in 2017. In his fourth run with the club, he assisted in clinching a postseason berth. After the conclusion of the PDL season, he returned to the CSL for the remainder of the 2017 season to play with SC Waterloo Region. He would play in the opening round of the postseason against the Serbian White Eagles where they were defeated in extra time.

=== Oceania ===
In the winter of 2017, he went abroad to play in the national New Zealand Football Championship with Hawke's Bay United. In total, he played in 17 matches and scored 2 goals. The following season, he played in the New Zealand second-tier Central League with Napier City Rovers. In his debut season with the Rovers, he helped the club secure the league title. He would appear in 18 matches and recorded 8 goals for Napier. After the conclusion of the season he departed from the New Zealand circuit.

=== Poland ===
After two seasons in New Zealand, he ventured to Eastern Europe in 2019 to play in the Polish IV liga with Tomasovia Tomaszów Lubelski. Cain would record 8 goals throughout the season with Tomasovia. In 2020, he played in the country's III liga with Hetman Zamość. After two seasons in the Polish circuits, he departed after the conclusion of the 2020–21 season.

=== Canada ===
In 2022, he returned to the Kitchener—Waterloo area to play with BVB IA Waterloo in League1 Ontario. In 2023, Cain joined North Mississauga SC, before later joining Guelph United F.C. midseason.

== International career ==
Cain was selected to represent the Canada men's national under-17 soccer team for the 2011 CONCACAF U-17 Championship. He would record a goal in his debut match for the national team in the opening match against Barbados. The national team would ultimately reach the tournament final where Canada was defeated by the United States in extra time. In total, he represented Canada in 5 matches and scored 1 goal.

== Honors ==
K–W United FC

- USL Premier Development League: 2015

Napier City Rovers FC

- Central League: 2018
