= 2022 League1 Ontario season (women) =

League1 Ontario Women's Division
- Season: 2022
- Dates: April 22 – July 24 (regular season)
- Champions: NDC Ontario
- Regular season champions: Vaughan Azzurri
- Matches: 189
- Goals: 682 (3.61 per match)
- Top goalscorer: Olivia Smith (18 goals)

The 2022 League1 Ontario season is the seventh season of play for Women's Division of League1 Ontario, a Division 3 women's soccer league in the Canadian soccer league system and the highest level of soccer based in the Canadian province of Ontario.

NDC Ontario defeated Alliance United FC in the final to win the league championship. As NDC Ontario was unavailable to participate in the League1 Canada Interprovincial Championship due to scheduling issues, Alliance United instead represented the league, finishing in third place.

== Format and changes ==
After the 2021 season format was adjusted into a shorter-season form with some teams opting out due to the COVID-19 pandemic, the league will return to a single table format with all clubs for the 2022 season. With the league set to split into a multi-division format with promotion-relegation beginning in 2024, the points obtained in this season will contribute to the original placement of clubs in 2024, with the points from the 2022 season (weighted at 75%) being added to the points teams obtain in the 2023 season (weighted at 100%) to determine the placements.

The top-six teams in the regular season qualified for the playoffs with the top-two teams receiving first round byes. The semi-finals were played on July 30 and 31 with the final on August 6. NDC Ontario won the championship and qualified for the Women's Interprovincial Championship in Laval, Quebec.

== Clubs ==
The women's division has grown to 20 teams through expansion. Burlington SC, Electric City FC, Simcoe County Rovers, St. Catharines Roma Wolves, and the Canada Soccer National Development Centre Ontario join the league as expansion teams, ProStars FC returns as a new club as well having previously competed for one season in 2015. Guelph Union and Waterloo United will make their official Premier Division debuts, after having opted out of the main division last season, having fielded teams in either the short-season Summer Championship or Reserve divisions instead.

The following clubs are set to participate in the league.

Women's division
Team	City	Principal stadium	Head coach
Alliance United FC	Scarborough (Toronto)	Centennial College	Angelo Cavalluzzo
Blue Devils FC	Oakville	Sheridan College Trafalgar	Natalie Bukovec
Burlington SC	Burlington	Haber Centre	Neil Wilson
BVB IA Waterloo	Waterloo	Warrior Field, University of Waterloo	John O'Brien
Darby FC	Clarington	South Courtice Turf	Graeme Burns
Electric City FC	Peterborough	Fleming College Stadium	Randy Ribeiro
Guelph Union	Guelph	Alumni Stadium	Onkar Dhillon
Hamilton United	Hamilton	Ron Joyce Stadium	Charles Ivanov
FC London	London	Portuguese Club of London	Garett Peters
NDC Ontario	Vaughan	Ontario Soccer Stadium	Joey Lombardi
North Mississauga SC	Mississauga	Churchill Meadows	Peyvand Mossavat
North Toronto Nitros	Toronto	Downsview Park	Chris Vickers
Pickering FC	Pickering	Pickering Soccer Centre & Kinsmen Park	Dmitri Ovtchinnikov
ProStars FC	Brampton	Victoria Park Stadium	Szabi Bozsoky
Simcoe County Rovers FC	Barrie	J.C Massie Field, Georgian College	Zack Wilson
St. Catharines Roma Wolves	St. Catharines	Roma Park – Under Armour Field	Davide Massafra
Tecumseh SC	Tecumseh	University of Windsor Stadium	Daniel Mendonca
Unionville Milliken SC	Unionville (Markham)	Bill Crothers Secondary School	Paul Omoghan
Vaughan Azzurri	Vaughan	North Maple Regional Park	Jorden Feliciano
Woodbridge Strikers	Woodbridge (Vaughan)	Vaughan Grove	David Porco

== Premier Division ==
Pos	Team	Pld	W	D	L	GF	GA	GD	Pts	Qualification
1	Vaughan Azzurri	19	15	3	1	50	8	+42	48	Playoff semifinals
2	NDC Ontario (C)	19	14	4	1	62	15	+47	46	Playoff semifinals
3	Woodbridge Strikers	19	12	6	1	40	15	+25	42	Play-in round
4	FC London	19	13	2	4	47	20	+27	41	Play-in round
5	Simcoe County Rovers FC	19	12	5	2	48	23	+25	41	Play-in round
6	Alliance United FC	19	11	4	4	46	20	+26	37	Play-in round
7	North Toronto Nitros	19	10	6	3	51	16	+35	36	
8	Electric City FC	19	10	2	7	45	19	+26	32	
9	North Mississauga SC	19	9	1	9	42	39	+3	28	
10	Darby FC	18	9	0	9	40	36	+4	27	
11	St Catharines Roma Wolves	19	8	1	10	28	29	−1	25	
12	Tecumseh SC	19	7	4	8	31	32	−1	25	
13	Guelph Union	19	7	3	9	28	28	0	24	
14	Unionville Milliken SC	18	7	1	10	27	57	−30	22	
15	Blue Devils FC	19	5	4	10	21	39	−18	19	
16	BVB IA Waterloo	19	4	3	12	28	53	−25	15	
17	Pickering FC	19	3	3	13	9	52	−43	12	
18	Hamilton United	19	3	1	15	17	59	−42	10	
19	ProStars FC	19	1	3	15	13	63	−50	6	
20	Burlington SC	19	1	0	18	9	59	−50	3	

Updated to match(es) played on August 7, 2022. Source: League1 Ontario
Rules for classification: 1) points; 2) total wins; 3) goal differential; 4) goals for; 5) away goals differential; 6) away goals for; 7) home goals differential; 8) home goals for; 9) head-to-head record; 10) coin toss or drawing of lots.
(C) Champions

=== Playoffs ===
Quarterfinals
3	Woodbridge Strikers	0
6	Alliance United	1
4	FC London	4
5	Simcoe County Rovers	3

Semifinals
1	Vaughan Azzurri	1
6	Alliance United	2
2	NDC Ontario	2
4	FC London	0

Finals
6	Alliance United	1
2	NDC Ontario	3

Quarter-finals

July 27, 2022	FC London	4–3	Simcoe County Rovers FC	London, Ontario
8:30 PM	Benati 9', 35'; Hicks 23'; Milligan 31'	Report	Desa 29'; Siwula 75', 90'	Stadium: Tricar Field

July 27, 2022	Woodbridge Strikers	0–1	Alliance United FC	Vaughan, Ontario
9:00 PM		Report	Cheung 4'	Stadium: Vaughan Grove Park

Semi-finals

July 30, 2022	Vaughan Azzurri	1–2	Alliance United	Vaughan, Ontario
6:00 PM	Chouhan 75'	Report	Cheung 9'; Parkes 19'	Stadium: North Maple Regional Park

July 30, 2022	NDC Ontario	2–0	FC London	Brampton, Ontario
8:00 PM	Watson 72'; Allen 76'	Report		Stadium: Save Max Sports Centre

Final

August 6, 2022	NDC Ontario	3–1	Alliance United	Vaughan, Ontario
7:30 PM	Rose 7', 15'; Maalouf 64'	Report	Parkes 8'	Stadium: Ontario Soccer Centre; Referee: Amanda Kwan

=== Statistics ===
Statistics include regular season matches only, not playoff matches.

==== Top goalscorers ====
Rank	Player	Club	Goals
1	Olivia Smith	North Toronto Nitros	18
2	Nadya Gill	North Mississauga SC	17
3	Jessica Lisi	Woodbridge Strikers	14
4	Kayla McQueen	Electric City FC	13
5	Laura Gosse	Alliance United	12
5	Chelsea Cheung	Alliance United	12
5	Julia Benati	FC London	12

==== Top goalkeepers ====
Rank	Player	Club	Minutes	GAA
1	Elizabeth Brenneman	Guelph Union	990	0.64
2	Raven Edwards-Dowdall	North Toronto Nitros	1080	0.67
3	Levanta Staggolis	Alliance United	900	1.10
4	Mykaela Volpe	Electric City FC	1260	1.14
5	Jadyn Steinhauer	FC London	1395	1.23
6	Yazmeen Jamieson	Simcoe County Rovers	1080	1.25
7	Emma Hendrie	St. Catharines Roma Wolves	1588	1.30

Minimum 900 minutes played. Source:

=== League honours ===
==== Awards ====
Award	Player	Team	Ref
Most Valuable Player	Julia Benati	FC London	
Young Player of the Year (U20)	Olivia Smith	North Toronto Nitros	
Coach of the Year	Joey Lombardi	NDC Ontario	
Goalkeeper of the Year	Jadyn Steinhauer	FC London	
Defender of the Year	Zoe Markesini	NDC Ontario	
Midfielder of the Year	Julia Benati	FC London	
Forward of the Year	Olivia Smith	North Toronto Nitros	
Golden Boot	Olivia Smith	North Toronto Nitros	

==== League All-Stars ====
The following players were named League1 Ontario All-Stars for the 2022 season:

First Team All-Star

Player	Position
Jadyn Steinhauer (London)	Goalkeeper
Renee Watson (NDC Ontario)	Defender
Zoe Markesini (NDC Ontario)	Defender
Sonia Walk (North Toronto)	Defender
Jenny Wolever (Alliance United)	Defender
Julia Benati (London)	Midfielder
April Syme (Woodbridge)	Midfielder
Cloey Uddenberg (Simcoe County)	Midfielder
Nadya Gill (North Mississauga)	Forward
Olivia Smith (North Toronto)	Forward
Jessica Lisi (Woodbridge)	Forward

Second Team All-Star

Player	Position
Mykaela Volpe (Electric City)	Goalkeeper
Christina Coroado (Woodbridge)	Defender
Maya Antoine (Vaughan Azzurri)	Defender
Alexis Wilson (Darby)	Defender
Ella Ottey (NDC Ontario)	Defender
Alanna Raimondo (NDC Ontario)	Midfielder
Brianne DeSa (Simcoe County)	Midfielder
Kalifornia Mitchell (Vaughan Azzurri)	Midfielder
Chelsea Cheung (Alliance United)	Forward
Kayla Briggs (NDC Ontario)	Forward
Leah Pais (Vaughan Azzurri)	Forward

Third Team All-Star

Player	Position
Yazmeen Jamieson (Simcoe County)	Goalkeeper
Ariana Mouratidis (Woodbridge)	Defender
Hannah Chown (Alliance United)	Defender
Avarie Thomas (London)	Defender
Kiarra Bailey (Hamilton United)	Defender
Tori Chia (Darby)	Midfielder
Nikayla Small (NDC Ontario)	Midfielder
Jotam Chouhan (Vaughan Azzurri)	Midfielder
Amanda Allen (NDC Ontario)	Forward
Christine Exeter (Darby)	Forward
Sabrina Bisante (St. Catharines)	Forward

The following players were named League1 Ontario Premier Division U18 All-Stars for the 2022 season:

U18 All-Star Team

Player	Position
Gurleen Toor (Alliance United)	Goalkeeper
Ella Ottey (NDC Ontario)	Defender
Zoe Markesini (NDC Ontario)	Defender
Renee Watson (NDC Ontario)	Defender
Sarah Rollins (North Toronto)	Defender
Hannah Anderson (Alliance United)	Midfielder
Sadie Waite (London)	Midfielder
Alanna Raimondo (NDC Ontario)	Midfielder
Nia Fleming-Thompson (Vaughan Azzurri)	Forward
Olivia Smith (North Toronto)	Forward
Amanda Allen (NDC Ontario)	Forward

== Summer Reserve Division ==
The Reserve Division will return with each Premier Division club fielding one or more teams, as well as some other non-Premier League OPDL clubs.

=== North East Division ===
Pos	Team	Pld	W	D	L	GF	GA	GD	Pts	Qualification
1	North Toronto Nitros B	12	9	2	1	34	10	+24	29	Advance to playoffs
2	Unionville Milliken SC B (C)	12	8	2	2	39	17	+22	26	Advance to playoffs
3	Richmond Hill SC	12	8	1	3	37	17	+20	25	
4	Alliance United FC B	12	7	2	3	26	15	+11	23	
5	Vaughan Azzurri B	12	7	0	5	36	20	+16	21	
6	FC Durham	12	6	3	3	31	18	+13	21	
7	Woodbridge Strikers B	12	5	0	7	24	20	+4	15	
8	Simcoe County Rovers FC B	12	2	3	7	17	26	−9	9	
9	Aurora FC	12	1	1	10	9	33	−24	4	
10	Darby FC B	12	0	0	12	3	80	−77	0	

Source: Standings
(C) Champions

=== West Division ===
Pos	Team	Pld	W	D	L	GF	GA	GD	Pts	Qualification
1	Guelph Union B	12	8	3	1	25	9	+16	27	Advance to playoffs
2	Hamilton United B	12	8	0	4	34	20	+14	24	
3	Cambridge United	12	6	4	2	20	12	+8	22	
4	North Mississauga SC B	11	6	0	5	35	22	+13	18	
5	Blue Devils FC B	10	5	2	3	15	10	+5	17	
6	BVB IA Waterloo B	11	4	1	6	12	21	−9	13	
7	Whitecaps London	12	4	0	8	13	21	−8	12	
8	Tecumseh SC B	10	4	0	6	11	19	−8	12	
9	ProStars FC B	11	3	1	7	16	26	−10	10	
10	FC London B	11	2	1	8	11	32	−21	7	

Source: Standings

=== Central Division ===
Pos	Team	Pld	W	D	L	GF	GA	GD	Pts	Qualification
1	Woodbridge Strikers C	12	11	1	0	53	4	+49	34	Advance to playoffs
2	Blue Devils FC C	12	7	2	3	31	16	+15	23	
3	Simcoe County Rovers FC C	11	6	2	3	19	21	−2	20	
4	Tecumseh SC C	8	6	0	2	26	12	+14	18	
5	North Toronto Nitros C	12	3	3	6	17	23	−6	12	
6	Vaughan Azzurri C	10	3	0	7	14	18	−4	9	
7	Unionville Milliken SC C	9	3	0	6	7	33	−26	9	
8	Hamilton United C	12	0	0	12	4	44	−40	0	

Source: Standings

==== Playoffs ====
Semifinals
NE1	North Toronto Nitros B	2
W1	Guelph Union B	0
C1	Woodbridge Strikers C	2(3)
WC	Unionville Milliken SC B	2(4)

Championship Game
NE1	North Toronto Nitros B	0
WC	Unionville Milliken SC B	1

== Fall Reserve Division ==
Pos	Team	Pld	W	D	L	GF	GA	GD	Pts	Qualification
1	North Toronto Nitros Reserves (O)	9	7	0	2	24	6	+18	21	Advance to playoffs
2	Tecumseh SC Reserves	9	6	2	1	22	6	+16	20	Advance to playoffs
3	Cambridge United	9	4	3	2	16	10	+6	15	Advance to playoffs
4	Simcoe County Rovers FC Reserves	9	4	3	2	14	12	+2	15	Advance to playoffs
5	Vaughan Azzurri Reserves	9	4	2	3	9	8	+1	14	
6	Unionville Milliken SC Reserves	9	2	2	5	4	13	−9	8	
7	FC London Reserves	9	1	2	6	4	20	−16	5	
8	ProStars FC Reserves	9	1	0	8	3	21	−18	3	

Source: Standings
(O) Play-off winners

=== Playoffs ===
Semifinals
1	North Toronto Nitros Reserves	5
4	Simcoe County Rovers FC Reserves	1
2	Tecumseh SC Reserves	1
3	Cambridge United	0

Championship Game
1	North Toronto Nitros Reserves	0(4)
2	Tecumseh SC Reserves	0(2)
