= FC London =

Canadian soccer team

- Full name: Football Club London
- Founded: 2008; 18 years ago (as Forest City London)
- Stadium: Tricar Field
- Capacity: 900
- Owner: Dave DeBenedictis
- Head Coach: Michael Silvera (men); Will Cromack (women)
- League: Ontario Premier League
- 2026: OPL2, 10th (men); OPL1, 5th (women)
- Website: fclondon.ca
Home colours

Football Club London is a Canadian semi-professional soccer club based in London, Ontario that plays in the men's and women's divisions of the Ontario Premier League in the Canadian third tier.

The team was founded in 2008 as Forest City London Soccer Club, and were a member of the Premier Development League from 2009 to 2015; they won the 2012 PDL title, their first championship during this time. They re-branded to FC London following their move to League1 Ontario in 2016, being officially named Football Club London.

In 2017, the club partnered with Toronto FC. FC London's youth teams were renamed London TFC , while the senior team retained the name FC London, but changed its colours to red to match those of Toronto FC.

== History ==
Founded in 2008, Forest City London joined the Premier Development League in 2009. In their first season, they had to split home matches between four stadiums. and played their first ever game on May 29, 2009, against Cleveland Internationals. London won the game 2–1, with the first goal in franchise history being scored by Kevin Zimmermann.

London's debut season was a generally positive one; they remained unbeaten over the course of their first ten games, winning seven games. London's first loss was a 3–1 drop to the Indiana Invaders at the beginning of July, and it initiated a complete reversal of fortune for the team. They did not win another game all season and dropped down the divisional standings. The team finished third in the Great Lakes Division, seven points behind divisional champions Kalamazoo, and faced off against Chicago Fire Premier in the first round of the playoffs. London lost their playoff match 1–0 to the Illinoisans on a goal by Andre Akpan. Kevin Zimmermann and Alan McGreal were London's top scorers in their debut season, with nine and seven goals respectively, while Anthony Di Biase contributed four assists.

They won the 2012 PDL Championship defeating Carolina Dynamo in the finals. The won their first Great Lakes division title the following season.

The club moved to League1 Ontario in 2016, adding teams in both the male and female divisions. The club went under new ownership and were renamed Football Club London following the move to L1O.

The women's team won the league title in the 2016 and 2017 seasons by winning the league division, while also winning the League Cup in 2017. They won the league division again in 2018, but fell in the semi-finals in the new playoff format. In 2019, they finished third in the regular season, but won the league championship, defeating Oakville Blue Devils in the playoff final.

The men's team won the Western Conference in their debut season in L1O in 2016, but fell to Vaughan Azzurri in the championship final. In 2018, they finished as regular season champions, but ultimately fell in the playoffs. During the 2019 season, they defeated Alliance United in the two legged playoff semi-finals by a 15–0 aggregate score, after victories of 5–0 and 10–0 across the two legs, respectively, before ultimately falling to Master's FA in the championship final.

In the latter part of 2017, the club became a partner of Major League Soccer club Toronto FC, with the club being renamed London TFC, although the senior side retained the name FC London, under which it still competes in L1O. As part of the rebrand, FC London changed their club colours and logo to red to match those of Toronto FC. In 2022, the club changed ownership from Ian Campbell to a group led by Dave DeBenedictis, the director of the London TFC Academy.

In 2024, the women's team won the league cup, in the first edition of the competition since 2018.

== Squad ==
As of 22 May 2026

Note: Flags indicate national team as defined under FIFA eligibility rules; some limited exceptions apply. Players may hold more than one non-FIFA nationality.

No.	Pos.	Nation	Player
-	GK	CAN	Luka Palajsa
-	GK	CAN	Adam Isovic
-	GK	CAN	Braulio De Leon
-	DF	CAN	Stefan Musta
-	DF	CAN	Ennis Bernaus
-	DF	CAN	Finn Bansal
-	DF	CAN	Ibrahem Saadi
-	DF	CAN	Nathanael Soer
-	MF	CAN	Aaron Stomp
-	MF	CAN	Owen Holmes
-	MF	CAN	Jonathan Lopez
-	MF	CAN	Santiago Fonseca
-	MF	CAN	Matthew Rogers

No.	Pos.	Nation	Player
-	MF	CAN	Pratik Tamhankar
-	MF	BAH	Chris Rahming Jr.
-	MF	CAN	Owen Scott
-	MF	CAN	Nico Jimenez
-	MF	CAN	Justin Brown
-	FW	CAN	Caleb Eastman
-	FW	CAN	Obada Abdallah
-	FW	CAN	Santiago Rios Canevari
-	FW	BAH	Marcel Joseph
-	FW	CAN	Stan Pankiewicz
-	FW	CAN	Luke Cairns
-	FW	CAN	Dan Morgan
-	FW	CAN	Hugo Paturel

== Former players ==
The following players have either moved on to the professional ranks after their time with FC London, or played professionally before joining the club.

Men

- (England) Thomas Beattie
- (Guyana) Brandon Beresford
- (England) Danny Deakin
- (Canada) Jamie Dell
- (Canada) Alex De Carolis
- (Canada) Kevin De Serpa
- (Canada) Anthony Di Biase
- (Canada) Kelsey Egwu
- (United States) Ben Fitzpatrick
- (Canada) Elvir Gigolaj
- (Syria) (Canada) Belal Halbouni
- (Canada) Carl Haworth
- (Canada) Tyler Hemming
- (Canada) Eleias Himaras
- (England) Luke Holmes
- (United States) Josh Hughes
- (United States) Ryan Maduro
- (Canada) Marko Maletic
- (United States) Kyle Manscuk
- (Antigua and Barbuda) Taj Moore
- (Zimbabwe) (Canada) Darlington Murasiranwa
- (England) Kal Okot
- (Canada) Mark Serjeant
- (United States) Andrew Sousa
- (England) Ryan Woods
- (The Bahamas) Christopher Rahming
- (The Bahamas) Marcel Joseph

Women

- (Canada) Julia Benati
- (Canada) Jade Kovacevic
- (Canada) Claire Monyard
- (Canada) Lauren Rowe
- (Canada) Sadie Waite
- (Canada) Madison Wilson

== Seasons ==
=== Men ===
Season	League	Record	Regular season	Playoffs	League Cup	Canadian Championship	Ref
2009	Premier Development League	8–3–5	3rd, Great Lakes	Divisional Semifinals	—	not eligible	
2010	Premier Development League	10–1–5	2nd, Great Lakes	Conference Semifinals	—	not eligible	
2011	Premier Development League	9–5–2	3rd, Great Lakes	Conference Quarterfinals	—	not eligible	
2012	Premier Development League	7–5–4	2nd, Great Lakes	Champions	—	not eligible	
2013	Premier Development League	10–2–2	1st, Great Lakes	Conference Final	—	not eligible	
2014	Premier Development League	6–4–4	4th, Great Lakes	did not qualify	—	not eligible	
2015	Premier Development League	9–4–1	3rd, Great Lakes	Divisional Playoff	—	not eligible	
2016	League1 Ontario	15–2–5	1st, West	Runner-up	Round of 16	not eligible	
2017	League1 Ontario	11–5–6	4th, West	did not qualify	Quarter-finals	not eligible	
2018	League1 Ontario	12–2–2	1st (overall)	Group stage	Quarter-finals	did not qualify	
2019	League1 Ontario	8–1–6	7th (overall)	Runner-up	—	did not qualify	
2020	League1 Ontario	Season cancelled due to COVID-19 pandemic					
2021	League1 Ontario	8–0–4	3rd, West	did not qualify	—	did not qualify	
2022	League1 Ontario	2–4–15	22nd	did not qualify	—	did not qualify	
2023	League1 Ontario	6–7–7	13th	did not qualify	—	did not qualify	
2024	League1 Ontario Championship	13–2–3	2nd ↑	–	Round of 16	did not qualify	
2025	League1 Ontario Premier	2–2–16	11th ↓		Quarter-finals	did not qualify	
2026	Ontario Premier League 2	5–4–13	10th		Round of 16	did not qualify	

=== Women ===
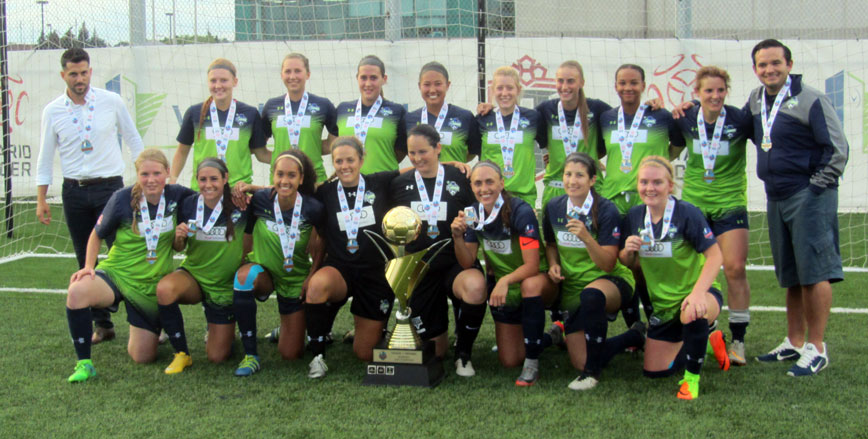
FC London wins 2017 L1O League Cup

Season	League	Teams	Record	Rank	Playoffs	League Cup	Ref
2016	League1 Ontario	9	14–0–2	Champions	–	Semi-finals	
2017	League1 Ontario	11	15–3–2	Champions	–	Champions	
2018	League1 Ontario	13	11–1–0	1st	Semi-finals	Quarter-finals	
2019	League1 Ontario	14	7–3–3	3rd	Champions	–	
2020	League1 Ontario	Season cancelled due to COVID-19 pandemic					
2021	League1 Ontario	7	9–2–1	1st	Semi-finals	–	
2022	League1 Ontario	20	13–2–4	4th	Semi-finals	–	
2023	League1 Ontario	19	9–5–4	6th	Semi-finals	–	
2024	League1 Ontario Premier	10	12–2–4	2nd	–	Champions	
2025	League1 Ontario Premier	10	3–4–11	9th	–	Semi-finals	
2026	Ontario Premier League 1	10	8-2-8	5th	–	Quarter-finals	

== Honours ==
- Premier Development League
  - National Champions: 2012
  - Central Conference Champions: 2012
  - Great Lakes Division Champions: 2013
- League1 Ontario
  - Western Conference Champions: 2016
  - Regular Season Champions: 2018

== Head coaches ==
- Martin Painter (2009–2016)
- Mario Despotović (2016–2017)
- Dom Kosic (2017–2018)
- Michael Marcoccia (2018–2021)
- Ruben Quintão (2022)
- Yiannis Tsalatsidis (2023–2025)
- Michael Silvera (2025, 2026-)
- Stiven Mikhail (2026)

== Stadium history ==
- TD Waterhouse Stadium; London, Ontario (2009–2010)
- London Portuguese Club Field; London, Ontario two games (2009–2010)
- London Marconi Soccer Club Field; London, Ontario four games (2009–2011)
- German Canadian Club of London Field; London, Ontario (2009–2020)
- London Portuguese Club Field; London, Ontario (2020-2021)
- Tricar Field; Lambeth, London, Ontario (2021–present)

== Average attendance ==
Attendance

- 2009: 1632 or 1,657 (5th in PDL)
- 2010: 1246 or 1,281 (5th in PDL)
- 2011: 841 or 868 (12th in PDL)
- 2012: 507 (17th in PDL)
- 2013: 1146 (9th in PDL)
- 2014: 777 (13th in PDL)
- 2015: 944 (5th in PDL)
- 2019: 250
- 2024: 947
