= 2023 League1 Ontario season =

League1 Ontario Men's Division
- Season: 2023
- Dates: April 12 – August 20 (regular season); August 23 – September 2 (playoffs)
- Champions: Simcoe County Rovers (1st title)
- Supporters Trophy: Scrosoppi FC (1st title)
- Matches: 215
- Top goalscorer: Tomasz Skublak (23 goals)

The 2023 Men's League1 Ontario season was the ninth of League1 Ontario, a Division 3 men's soccer league in the Canadian soccer pyramid and the highest level of soccer based in the Canadian province of Ontario. Following the 2023 season, the league will split into three divisions with promotion and relegation between them.

Simcoe County Rovers FC were the league champions, having defeated Scrosoppi FC in the final to capture their first title.

== Clubs ==
With the exception of Pickering FC, 21 of the 22 clubs that took part in the 2022 season participated in 2023. Because of the format changes planned for the following year, the league imposed a one-year moratorium on any new teams joining the league.

Team	City	Principal stadium	Head coach
Alliance United FC	Toronto/Markham	Varsity Stadium / Birchmount Stadium	Ilya Orlov
Blue Devils FC	Oakville	Sheridan College Trafalgar	Duncan Wilde
Burlington SC	Burlington	Corpus Christi CSS	Darren Tilley
BVB IA Waterloo	Waterloo	RIM Park	John O'Brien
Darby FC	Whitby	Whitby Soccer Centre	Hermann Kingue
Electric City FC	Peterborough	Fleming College Sports Complex	Randy Ribeiro
Guelph United F.C.	Guelph	Alumni Stadium/Centennial Bowl	Justin Springer
Hamilton United	Hamilton	Ron Joyce Stadium, McMaster University	Kamran Derayeh
FC London	London	Tricar Field	Yiannis Tsalatsidis
Master's Futbol	Scarborough (Toronto)	L'Amoreaux Park	Giuseppe Mattace-Raso
North Mississauga SC	Mississauga	Churchill Meadows (Mattamy Sports Park)	Amir Riazi
North Toronto Nitros	Toronto	Downsview Park	Marko Milanović
ProStars FC	Brampton	Victoria Park Stadium	Sam Medeiros
Scrosoppi FC	Milton	Ontario Soccer Centre	John Yacou
Sigma FC	Mississauga	Paramount Fine Foods Centre / Tim Hortons Field	John Zervos
Simcoe County Rovers FC	Barrie	J.C Massie Field, Georgian College	Jason Beckford
St. Catharines Roma Wolves	St. Catharines	Roma Park – Under Armour Field	Federico Turriziani
Unionville Milliken SC	Unionville (Markham)	Ontario Soccer Centre	Filipe Bento
Vaughan Azzurri	Vaughan	North Maple Regional Park	Carmine Isacco / Sergio De Luca
Windsor City FC	Amherstburg	St. Clair College	Valtar Cosenza
Woodbridge Strikers	Woodbridge (Vaughan)	Vaughan Grove	Peter Pinizzotto

== Premier Division ==
On March 7, 2023, League1 Ontario announced that the Men's Premier Division season would begin on April 13 (later revised to April 12). Each team played 20 matches this season, one match against each opponent.

Pos	Team	Pld	W	D	L	GF	GA	GD	Pts	Qualification
1	Scrosoppi FC	20	17	0	3	52	18	+34	51	Playoff semifinals
2	Simcoe County Rovers FC (C)	20	15	1	4	56	25	+31	46	Playoff semifinals
3	Vaughan Azzurri	20	14	3	3	52	20	+32	45	Playoff quarterfinals
4	Blue Devils FC	20	12	3	5	44	25	+19	39	Playoff quarterfinals
5	Burlington SC	20	12	3	5	43	29	+14	39	Playoff quarterfinals
6	Guelph United F.C.	20	11	6	3	43	22	+21	39	Playoff quarterfinals
7	Electric City FC	20	11	4	5	50	19	+31	37	
8	Alliance United FC	20	9	6	5	51	23	+28	33	
9	Sigma FC	20	9	5	6	50	39	+11	32	
10	North Toronto Nitros	20	9	4	7	46	33	+13	31	
11	Hamilton United	20	7	5	8	34	33	+1	26	
12	Woodbridge Strikers	20	6	8	6	28	31	−3	26	
13	FC London	20	6	7	7	31	37	−6	25	
14	Darby FC	20	6	5	9	34	30	+4	23	
15	Windsor City FC	20	6	2	12	34	45	−11	20 (Note: Unionville Milliken's 2–0 victory over Windsor City was changed to a 3–0 loss, due to the fielding of an ineligible player)	
16	St. Catharines Roma Wolves	20	6	2	12	27	48	−21	20	
17	North Mississauga SC	20	5	5	10	28	37	−9	20	
18	ProStars FC	20	5	4	11	30	51	−21	19	
19	Master's FA	20	4	2	14	20	44	−24	14	
20	Unionville Milliken SC	20	1	1	18	16	78	−62	4	
21	BVB IA Waterloo	20	1	0	19	13	95	−82	3	

Source: League1 Ontario
Rules for classification: 1) points; 2) total wins; 3) goal differential; 4) goals for; 5) away goals differential; 6) away goals for; 7) home goals differential; 8) home goals for; 9) head-to-head record; 10) coin toss or drawing of lots.
(C) Champions

=== Playoffs ===
The top two seeds earned a bye directly to the second round. After the first round, the teams are re-seeded with the top seed playing the lowest ranked remaining seed.

Quarter-finals; August 23
4	Blue Devils FC	4
5	Burlington SC	1
3	Vaughan Azzurri	2
6	Guelph United FC	0

Semi-finals; August 26–27
1	Scrosoppi FC	2
4	Blue Devils FC	1
2	Simcoe County Rovers FC	3
3	Vaughan Azzurri	0

Final; September 2
1	Scrosoppi FC	2
2	Simcoe County Rovers FC	4

Quarter-finals

August 23, 2023	Blue Devils FC	4–1	Burlington SC	Oakville, Ontario
8:00 PM	Czerkawski 14', 19', 59'; Hamade 40'	Report	Singh-Sharpe 61'	Stadium: Pine Glen Park; Referee: John-Morgan Pizzuti

August 23, 2023	Vaughan Azzurri	2–0	Guelph United FC	Vaughan, Ontario
8:00 PM	Olatoye 2'; Robinson 45'	Report		Stadium: North Maple Regional Park

Semi-finals

August 26, 2023	Scrosoppi FC	2–1	Blue Devils FC	Vaughan, Ontario
9:00 PM	Zis 24', 27'	Report	McGrouther 90+4'	Stadium: Ontario Soccer Centre

August 27, 2023	Simcoe County Rovers FC	3–0	Vaughan Azzurri	Barrie, Ontario
6:30 PM	Layne 21'; Reid 50'; Benítez 63'			Stadium: J.C Massie Field (Georgian College)

Final

September 2, 2023	Scrosoppi FC	2–4	Simcoe County Rovers FC	Vaughan, Ontario
7:00 PM	Cotterell 44'; Skublak 83'	Report	Lawson 5'; Karagianakos 9'; Layne 67' (pen.), 87'	Stadium: Ontario Soccer Centre; Attendance: 1150; Referee: Scott Bowman

=== Statistics ===
==== Top goalscorers ====
(regular season only)

Rank	Player	Club	Goals
1	(Canada) Tomasz Skublak	Scrosoppi FC	23
2	(Canada) Christopher Campoli	Vaughan Azzurri	17
3	(Canada) Adam Czerkawski	Blue Devils FC	15
3	(Cuba) Orlendis Benítez	Simcoe County Rovers	15
5	(Guyana) Kashiff Collins	Darby FC	14
6	(Canada) Owen Antoniuk	Windsor City	13
6	(Canada) Augustus Oku	Burlington SC	13
8	(Canada) Jared Agyemang	Guelph United	12
9	(Canada) Jevontae Layne	Simcoe County Rovers	11
9	(Canada) Nikola Stakic	Alliance United	11
9	(Canada) Michael Soloman	St. Catharines Roma Wolves	11

Source: League1 Ontario

==== Top goalkeepers ====
(regular season only)

Rank	Player	Club	Minutes	GAA
1	(Ukraine) Svyatik Artemenko	Electric City FC	1600	0.90
2	(Canada) Praveen Ahilan	Alliance United	878	0.92
3	(Estonia) Andreas Vaikla	Scrosoppi FC	1519	0.95
4	(Canada) Carter Robart	Guelph United	1800	1.10
5	(Canada) Alessio Carbone	Vaughan Azzurri	810	1.11
6	(Canada) Baj Maan	Simcoe County Rovers	1665	1.14

Minimum: 810 minutes played
Source: League1 Ontario

=== League honours ===
==== Awards ====
Award	Player	Team	Ref
Most Valuable Player	Tomasz Skublak	Scrosoppi FC	
Young Player of the Year (U20)	Marcus Caldeira	Sigma FC	
Coach of the Year	Jason Beckford	Simcoe County Rovers FC	
Goalkeeper of the Year	Baj Maan	Simcoe County Rovers FC	
Defender of the Year	Gianfranco Facchineri	Windsor City FC	
Midfielder of the Year	Orlendis Benítez Hernández	Simcoe County Rovers FC	
Forward of the Year	Tomasz Skublak	Scrosoppi FC	
Golden Boot (top scorer)	Tomasz Skublak	Scrosoppi FC	

==== League All-Stars ====
The following players were named League1 Ontario Premier Division All-Stars for the 2023 season:

First Team All-Stars

Player	Position
Baj Maan (Simcoe County Rovers)	Goalkeeper
Amardo Oakley (Guelph United)	Defender
Gianfranco Facchineri (Windsor City)	Defender
Justin Earle (Simcoe County Rovers)	Defender
Carlo DiFeo (Scrosoppi)	Defender
Orlendis Benítez Hernández (Simcoe County Rovers)	Midfielder
Nikola Stakic (Alliance United)	Midfielder
Christian Zeppieri (Vaughan Azzurri)	Midfielder
Alexander Zis (Scrosoppi)	Midfielder
Tomasz Skublak (Scrosoppi)	Forward
Adam Czerkawski (Blue Devils)	Forward

Second Team All-Stars

Player	Position
Andreas Vaikla (Scrosoppi)	Goalkeeper
Andra Neptune (Blue Devils)	Defender
Nyal Higgins (Vaughan Azzurri)	Defender
Bradley Heath (Electric City)	Defender
Nirun Sivananthan (Alliance United)	Defender
Marcus Caldeira (Sigma)	Midfielder
Gray Yates (Guelph United)	Midfielder
Ideal Shefqeti (Hamilton United)	Midfielder
Brandon Duarte (Blue Devils)	Midfielder
Jevontae Layne (Simcoe County Rovers)	Forward
Augustus Oku (Burlington)	Forward

=== Future format and changes ===
Starting in 2024, the league will split into a multi-division format with promotion and relegation between them. Twelve teams will take part in the first-tier League1 Premier, ten teams in the second-tier League1 Championship, and all new expansion teams as well as reserve sides in a third-tier League2 Ontario.

The initial assignment of teams in the 2024 season is done by using the points obtained in the previous two years. The points from the 2022 season (weighted at 75%) will be added to the points teams obtain in the 2023 season (weighted at 100%) to determine the placements.

Pos	Team	GP	2022	2023	Total	Qualification
1	Vaughan Azzurri	41	42.75	45	87.75	Qualification to 2024 League1 Premier
2	Simcoe County Rovers FC	41	33	46	79	Qualification to 2024 League1 Premier
3	Blue Devils FC	41	35.25	39	74.25	Qualification to 2024 League1 Premier
4	Scrosoppi FC	41	21	51	72	Qualification to 2024 League1 Premier
5	Guelph United F.C.	41	31.5	39	70.5	Qualification to 2024 League1 Premier
6	Alliance United FC	41	33.75	33	66.75	Qualification to 2024 League1 Premier
7	North Toronto Nitros	41	33	31	64	Qualification to 2024 League1 Premier
8	Electric City FC	41	22.5	37	59.5	Folded after season
9	Sigma FC	41	23.25	32	55.25	Qualification to 2024 League1 Premier
10	Burlington SC	41	14.25	39	53.25	Qualification to 2024 League1 Premier
11	ProStars FC	41	32.25	19	51.25	Qualification to 2024 League1 Premier
12	Hamilton United	41	23.25	26	49.25	Qualification to 2024 League1 Premier
13	Woodbridge Strikers (Note: Woodbridge initially qualified for the League1 Championship. However, they were later promoted to the Premier Division to replace Electric City, upon their folding.)	41	21.75	26	47.75	Qualification to 2024 League1 Premier
14	Darby FC	41	18.75	23	41.75	Qualification to 2024 League1 Championship
15	St. Catharines Roma Wolves	41	15	20	35	Qualification to 2024 League1 Championship
16	Windsor City FC	41	13.5	20	33.5	Qualification to 2024 League1 Championship
17	FC London	41	7.5	25	32.5	Qualification to 2024 League1 Championship
18	North Mississauga SC	41	10.5	20	30.5	Qualification to 2024 League1 Championship
19	Master's FA	41	12.75	14	26.75	Qualification to 2024 League1 Championship
20	BVB IA Waterloo	41	16.5	3	19.5	Qualification to 2024 League1 Championship
21	Unionville Milliken SC	41	10.5	4	14.5	Qualification to 2024 League1 Championship
22	Pickering FC (Note: Pickering FC did not compete in the 2023 season and therefore had their L1O license revoked. Following the 2023 season, Pickering acquired the L1O licence from Electric City and were assigned to the League1 Championship division for 2024.) (Z)	21	17.25	—	17.25	Ineligible for qualification

(Z) Did not participate in 2023

== U21 Reserve Division ==
The Reserve Division will return with each Premier Division club fielding one or more teams, as well as some other OPDL clubs that do not operate a League1 Ontario team.

=== North East Division ===
Pos	Team	Pld	W	D	L	GF	GA	GD	Pts	Qualification
1	Electric City FC U21	14	10	3	1	41	13	+28	33	Advance to playoffs
2	Pickering FC U21	14	9	3	2	36	18	+18	30	
3	Alliance United FC U21	14	8	1	5	38	28	+10	25	
4	Master's FA U21 North East	14	7	1	6	34	24	+10	22	
5	Unionville Milliken SC U21	14	7	0	7	30	31	−1	21	
6	Darby FC U21	14	6	0	8	27	32	−5	18	
7	Aurora FC U21	14	3	1	10	25	43	−18	10	
8	Simcoe County Rovers FC U21 Northeast	14	1	1	12	17	59	−42	4	

Source: League1 Ontario

=== North West Division ===
Pos	Team	Pld	W	D	L	GF	GA	GD	Pts	Qualification
1	ProStars FC U21	14	9	3	2	46	23	+23	30	Advance to playoffs
2	Blue Devils FC U21	14	9	3	2	36	23	+13	30	
3	Scrosoppi FC U21	14	8	1	5	34	21	+13	25	
4	North Mississauga SC U21	14	7	1	6	30	35	−5	22	
5	Rush Canada U21	14	5	5	4	28	24	+4	20	
6	Hamilton United U21	13	4	4	5	17	22	−5	16	
7	Burlington SC U21	14	1	3	10	18	35	−17	6	
8	Oakville SC U21	13	1	2	10	18	44	−26	5	

Updated to match(es) played on July 25, 2023. Source: League1 Ontario

=== Central Division ===
Pos	Team	Pld	W	D	L	GF	GA	GD	Pts	Qualification
1	Woodbridge Strikers U21	14	11	2	1	38	19	+19	35	Advance to playoffs
2	North Toronto Nitros U21	14	11	1	2	45	15	+30	34	
3	Sigma FC U21	14	10	1	3	41	11	+30	31	
4	Simcoe County Rovers FC U21 Central	14	6	3	5	27	28	−1	21	
5	Vaughan Azzurri U21	13	4	4	5	24	26	−2	16	
6	Toronto Skillz FC U21	14	2	3	9	10	36	−26	9	
7	Toronto High Park FC U21	14	1	3	10	20	44	−24	6	
8	Master's FA U21 Central	13	0	3	10	16	42	−26	3	

Updated to match(es) played on July 25, 2023. Source: League1 Ontario

=== South West Division ===
Pos	Team	Pld	W	D	L	GF	GA	GD	Pts	Qualification
1	Guelph United F.C. U21 (C)	14	9	3	2	30	13	+17	30	Advance to playoffs
2	Cambridge United U21	14	8	4	2	29	12	+17	28	
3	Whitecaps London U21	14	8	2	4	31	16	+15	26	
4	FC London U21	14	8	0	6	34	21	+13	24	
5	Tecumseh SC U21	14	7	2	5	33	22	+11	23	
6	Windsor City FC U21	14	3	5	6	19	36	−17	14	
7	St. Catharines Roma Wolves U21	14	1	3	10	14	46	−32	6	
8	BVB IA Waterloo U21	14	2	1	11	12	36	−24	7	

Source: League1 Ontario
(C) Champions

=== Playoffs ===
Semifinals; July 26–27
NE1	Electric City FC U21	0
C1	Woodbridge Strikers U21	3
SW1	Guelph United FC U21	2(7)
NW1	ProStars FC U21	2(6)

Championship Game; August 4
C1	Woodbridge Strikers U21	0
SW1	Guelph United FC U21	1

== U19 Reserve Division ==
=== Summer Division ===
Each team will play every team in their division once, as well as two games against teams from the opposite division.

==== East Division ====
Pos	Team	Pld	W	D	L	GF	GA	GD	Pts	Qualification
1	Sigma FC U19	12	10	1	1	52	11	+41	31	Advance to playoffs
2	Woodbridge Strikers U19	12	10	1	1	32	13	+19	31	Advance to playoffs
3	Alliance United FC U19	12	7	2	3	26	21	+5	23	
4	North Toronto Nitros U19	12	6	4	2	36	20	+16	22	
5	Simcoe County Rovers FC U19	12	6	2	4	40	30	+10	20	
6	Vaughan Azzurri U19	12	5	3	4	36	20	+16	18	
7	Master's FA U19	12	5	3	4	29	21	+8	18	
8	Unionville Milliken SC U19	12	4	0	8	27	55	−28	12	
9	Pickering FC U19	12	2	2	8	15	49	−34	8	
10	Richmond Hill SC U19	12	1	1	10	14	41	−27	4	
11	Darby FC U19	12	1	1	10	15	46	−31	4	

Source: League1 Ontario

==== West Division ====
Pos	Team	Pld	W	D	L	GF	GA	GD	Pts	Qualification
1	North Mississauga SC U19	12	11	0	1	68	15	+53	33	Advance to playoffs
2	Rush Canada U19 (C)	12	9	1	2	50	12	+38	28	Advance to playoffs
3	Burlington SC U19	12	6	2	4	25	21	+4	20	
4	ProStars FC U19	12	6	2	4	20	20	0	20	
5	Hamilton United U19	12	6	0	6	14	24	−10	18	
6	Scrosoppi FC U19	12	5	2	5	24	18	+6	17	
7	Cambridge United U19	12	4	3	5	18	23	−5	15	
8	Guelph United F.C. U19	12	4	2	6	25	17	+8	14	
9	Blue Devils FC U19	12	4	2	6	20	34	−14	14	
10	Brampton SC U19	12	1	1	10	8	54	−46	4	
11	St. Catharines Roma Wolves U19	12	0	3	9	13	42	−29	3	

Source: League1 Ontario
(C) Champions

==== Playoffs ====
Semi-Finals; July 31 - August 1
W1	North Mississauga SC U19	5
E2	Woodbridge Strikers U19	0
E1	Sigma FC U19	2
W2	Rush Canada U19	3

Championship Game; August 6
W1	North Mississauga SC U19	1(2)
W2	Rush Canada U19	1(3)

=== Fall Division ===
==== East Division ====
Pos	Team	Pld	W	D	L	GF	GA	GD	Pts	Qualification
1	Toronto FC Academy U19 (C)	12	12	0	0	70	9	+61	36	Advance to playoffs
2	Sigma FC U19	12	10	1	1	42	20	+22	31	Advance to playoffs
3	Vaughan Azzurri U19	12	9	1	2	43	20	+23	28	
4	Woodbridge Strikers U19	12	7	1	4	29	24	+5	22	
5	Master's FA U19	12	6	1	5	31	28	+3	19	
6	North Toronto Nitros U19	12	5	3	4	23	17	+6	18	
7	Unionville Milliken SC U19	12	4	2	6	26	36	−10	14	
8	Pickering FC U19	12	2	1	9	15	42	−27	7	
9	Alliance United FC U19	12	2	0	10	14	40	−26	6	
10	Richmond Hill SC U19	12	1	2	9	17	40	−23	5	

Source: League1 Ontario
(C) Champions

==== West Division ====
Pos	Team	Pld	W	D	L	GF	GA	GD	Pts	Qualification
1	Rush Canada U19	12	11	0	1	52	18	+34	33	Advance to playoffs
2	Scrosoppi FC U19	12	8	0	4	31	27	+4	24	Advance to playoffs
3	North Mississauga SC U19	12	6	2	4	40	29	+11	20	
4	Blue Devils FC U19	12	5	3	4	27	24	+3	18	
5	Burlington SC U19	12	5	2	5	21	23	−2	17	
6	Simcoe County Rovers FC U19	12	4	3	5	29	24	+5	15	
7	ProStars FC U19	12	5	0	7	32	34	−2	15	
8	Guelph United F.C. U19	12	3	1	8	25	30	−5	10	
9	Hamilton United U19	12	2	1	9	9	32	−23	7	
10	Brampton SC U19	12	0	2	10	3	62	−59	2	

Source: League1 Ontario

==== Playoffs ====
Semi-Finals; November 13-14
E1	Toronto FC Academy U19	3
W2	Scrosoppi FC U19	0
W1	Rush Canada U19	3
E2	Sigma FC U19	5

Championship Game; November 18
E1	Toronto FC Academy U19	2
E2	Sigma FC U19	0
