= Marko Maletic (soccer, born 1999) =

Canadian association football player

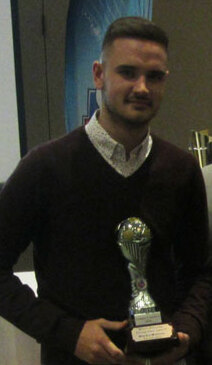
- Maletic receives L1O Young Player of the Year award in 2018

Personal information
- Full name: Marko Luka Maletic
- Date of birth: June 23, 1999 (age 27)
- Place of birth: Kitchener, Ontario, Canada
- Height: 1.90 m (6 ft 3 in)
- Position: Defender

Team information
- Current team: BVB IA Waterloo

Youth career
- Kitchener SC
- Waterloo Minor SC
- Mississauga Falcons SC
- 2015: ProStars FC
- 2015–2016: Dinamo Zagreb
- 2016: Toronto FC
- 2017: Hajduk Split

Senior career*
Years	Team	Apps	(Gls)
2016	Toronto FC III	15	(0)
2016	Toronto FC II	7	(0)
2018–2019	FC London	21	(0)
2019	NK Špansko	4	(0)
2020	NK Trnje		
2020–2021	NK Karlovac		
2021	FC London	10	(0)
2022–2023	Guelph United FC	16	(0)
2024	BVB IA Waterloo	8	(1)

International career^{‡}
2015	Croatia U16	2	(0)
2016	Canada U18	1	(0)
- * Club domestic league appearances and goals as of August 17, 2024 ‡ National team caps and goals as of May 8, 2019

Marko Luka Maletic (Croatian: Maletić; born June 23, 1999) is a Canadian soccer player.

== Early life ==
Maletic began playing soccer at age six with Kitchener SC. Afterwards he played for Waterloo Minor SC, Mississauga Falcons, and ProStars FC, while also playing with the Ontario provincial team. In 2015, he moved to Croatia and joined the Dinamo Zagreb Academy. In 2016, he returned to Canada and joined the Toronto FC Academy. In 2017, he returned to Croatia and joined the youth system of HNK Hajduk Split.

== Club career ==
In 2016, he played for Toronto FC III in both League1 Ontario and the Premier Development League.

In July 2016, Maletic was promoted to Toronto FC II and made his professional debut on July 10 against the Harrisburg City Islanders. He did not return to the side in 2017.

In 2018, Maletic began playing for League1 Ontario side FC London, where he made fourteen regular season appearances and one playoff appearance. That season, he was a starter for the mid-season all-star game for the League1 Ontario All-Stars against the PLSQ All-Stars. At the end of the season, he was named the League1 Ontario Co-Young Player of the Year and was named a First Team All-Star. In 2019, he made seven league appearances.

During the 2019–2020 season, he played for Croatian club NK Špansko, followed by NK Trnje.

In July 2020, he joined NK Karlovac. He departed the club in early February 2021.

In 2021, he returned to FC London, making ten league appearances.

In 2022, he joined Guelph United F.C. in League1 Ontario, with whom he played in the 2022 Canadian Championship against HFX Wanderers FC. He made nine league appearances in League1 Ontario.

== International career ==
In 2014, he attended a camp with the Canada U15 team.

In March 2015, he was called up to the Croatia U16 team, with whom he played two matches.
