= Cambridge United (Canada) =

Soccer club in Cambridge, Ontario

- Full name: Cambridge Youth Soccer
- Nickname: The Bridge
- Founded: 1973; 53 years ago
- Stadium: Fountain Street Soccer Field, Cambridge, Ontario
- Coordinates: 43.3885°N 80.3813°W
- President: Nicole Borges
- Head coach: Jon Morgan (men); Neil Wilson (women)
- League: League2 Ontario
- 2025: L2O Southwest, 1st - promoted (men); L2O Southwest, 3rd - promoted (women)
- Website: www.cambridgel1.ca
Home colours

Cambridge United is a Canadian semi-professional soccer club based in Cambridge, Ontario that competes in the men's and women's division of League2 Ontario. They were founded in 1973, and their home field is Fountain Street Soccer field.

== History ==
=== Foundation and Early development ===

The club was founded in 1973, when the city of Cambridge was amalgamated. The club is officially named Cambridge Youth Soccer, with the competitive teams operating under the name Cambridge United. In 2018, the club was granted a license to have youth teams participate in the OPDL.

In 2022, a new seven-field complex began construction for the club, which was completed in 2024, which will be shared with Conestoga College. (It was originally to be a 12 field facility when announced in 2018)

=== Semi-professional team ===
For 2025, they officially added a semi-professional team in the League1 Ontario pyramid, in both the men's and women's divisions, after having participated in the Reserve Divisions for a few years, joining the third tier League2 Ontario. The women's inaugural match resulted in a loss to Waterloo United in the League1 Cup, while the men defeated first tier side Alliance United FC 3–0 to advance to the second round. Their home opener occurred on April 27 against Waterloo United B. In their inaugural seasons, both the men's and women's earned promotion to the League1 Ontario Championship for 2026, through the promotion playoffs.

== Roster ==
As of July 31, 2025

=== Staff ===
Men		Women	
Staff	Name	Staff	Name
Head coach	Jon Morgan	Head coach	Neil Wilson
Assistant Coach	Mickael Rougette	Assistant Coach	Isabel Lynch
Assistant Coach	Andrew Agyare-Tabbi	Assistant Coach	Laurie Halfpenny-Mitchell
Goalkeeper Coach	Graeme Mitchell	Goalkeeper Coach	Graeme Mitchell
Strength and Conditioning	Phoenix Stone	Strength and Conditioning	Phoenix Stone
Trainer	Anna Leuenberger		

=== Men ===
Note: Flags indicate national team as defined under FIFA eligibility rules; some limited exceptions apply. Players may hold more than one non-FIFA nationality.

No.	Pos.	Nation	Player
—	GK	CAN	Sam Schafer
—	GK	USA	James Ramsay
—	GK	CAN	Taras Obelnicki
—	DF	CAN	Patrick Brousseau
—	DF	CAN	Sebastian Noftall
—	DF	CAN	Calum Heimbecker
—	DF	CAN	Adrian Andrasic
—	DF	CAN	Tristan Greenidge
—	DF	ENG	Harvey Marchant
—	DF	CAN	Saab Kohar
—	DF	CAN	Landon Paton
—	DF	CAN	Matteo Grant
—	DF	CAN	Colin Gander

No.	Pos.	Nation	Player
—	DF	CAN	Harjas Sran
—	MF	CAN	Marko Lesic
—	MF	KOR	Dylan Mun
—	MF	CAN	Kaven Thamilventhan
—	MF	CAN	Evan Antolcic
—	MF	CAN	Alex Amaral
—	MF	CAN	Nikolas Antolcic
—	MF	CAN	Denilson Clamp
—	FW	CAN	Jon Elezi
—	FW	CAN	Christian Ferraro
—	FW	SCO	Gregor McKeon
—	FW	CAN	Luca Romano
—	FW	CAN	Matthew Ciavarro

=== Women ===
Note: Flags indicate national team as defined under FIFA eligibility rules; some limited exceptions apply. Players may hold more than one non-FIFA nationality.

No.	Pos.	Nation	Player
—	GK	CAN	Clara Ruano
—	GK	CAN	Alexis Mulgrave
—	DF	CAN	Isabelle Krause
—	DF	CAN	Madison Ingraham
—	DF	CAN	Erica Davies
—	DF	CAN	Isabelle Smith
—	DF	CAN	Emma Wagner
—	DF	CAN	Emma Perrotta
—	DF	CAN	Jesse Olson
—	MF	CAN	Aliyah Jefferies
—	MF	CAN	Hanna Singbeil

No.	Pos.	Nation	Player
—	MF	CAN	Rebecca Friesen
—	MF	CAN	Summer Feig
—	MF	CAN	Emily Stenhouse
—	MF	CAN	Hannah Petersen
—	MF	CAN	Sarah Campbell
—	FW	CAN	Chloe Campbell
—	FW	CAN	Annie Barclay
—	FW	CAN	Natalie Ross
—	FW	CAN	Kate Ellis
—	FW	CAN	Hope Johnson

== Season ==
=== Men ===
Season	League	Teams	Record	Rank	Playoffs	League Cup	Ref
2025	League2 Ontario; Southwest Conference	8	12–0–2	1st ↑	–	Round of 16	

=== Women ===
Season	League	Teams	Record	Rank	Playoffs	League Cup	Ref
2025	League2 Ontario; Southwest Conference	10	8–1–5	3rd ↑	–	Round of 32	
