= 2026 Ontario Premier League season (women) =

Semi-pro soccer league season of Ontario, Canada

Ontario Premier League
- Season: 2026
- OPL Cup champions: Guelph United FC

The 2026 Ontario Premier League season was the eleventh season of the Ontario Premier League (and the first since rebranding from League1 Ontario), a Division 3 women's soccer league in the Canadian soccer league system and the highest level of soccer based in the Canadian province of Ontario. The league is split into three divisions with promotion and relegation between them.

The OPL1 and the OPL2 divisions were both be composed of 10 clubs, most returning from last season, with the exception of International FC that has replaced Alliance United FC in the top division. The OPL3 was be made up by three conferences containing total of 25 teams. These were mostly reserve teams with some "A" teams, including two newly licensed clubs.

== Ontario Premier League 1 ==
Ontario Premier League 1
- Season: 2026
- Dates: April 18 – August 23
- Champions: Simcoe County Rovers FC
- Relegated: North Mississauga SC

Ontario Premier League 1 was be composed of 10 teams. Scrosoppi FC was promoted from the Championship division last season. Alliance United FC was relegated and subsequently left the league.

The 10 teams faced each other twice, once at home and once away for a total of 18 matches. At the end of the season, the club at the top of the standings was crowned as Ontario Premier League champions. The club that finishes in 9th advanced to the promotion playoffs against the second-place finisher in the OPL2, while the 10th placed club was automatically relegated to the OPL2 division.

=== Clubs ===
Ontario Premier League 1
Team	City	Principal stadium	Head coach
FC London	London	Tricar Field	
Guelph United FC	Guelph	Centennial Bowl	
AFC Toronto Academy	Vaughan	Ontario Soccer Centre	
North Mississauga SC	Mississauga	Churchill Meadows (Mattamy Sports Park)	
North Toronto Nitros	North York (Toronto)	Downsview Park	
Scrosoppi FC	Milton	St. Francis Xavier	
Simcoe County Rovers FC	Barrie	J.C. Massie Field	
Vaughan Azzurri	Vaughan	North Maple Field	
Waterloo United	Waterloo	RIM Park	
Woodbridge Strikers	Woodbridge (Vaughan)	Vaughan Grove Field	

=== Standings ===
Pos	Team	Pld	W	D	L	GF	GA	GD	Pts	Relegation
1	Simcoe County Rovers FC (C)	18	16	2	0	54	11	+43	50	
2	NDC Ontario	18	12	2	4	46	19	+27	38	
3	Guelph United FC	18	12	1	5	48	26	+22	37	
4	Vaughan Azzurri	18	9	1	8	37	21	+16	28	
5	FC London	18	8	2	8	28	33	−5	26	
6	Scrosoppi FC	18	6	7	5	28	23	+5	25	
7	Woodbridge Strikers	18	6	3	9	30	31	−1	21	
8	Waterloo United	18	6	2	10	23	41	−18	20	
9	North Toronto Nitros	18	4	2	12	23	46	−23	14	Qualification to relegation playoffs
10	North Mississauga SC (R)	18	0	0	18	9	75	−66	0	Relegation to Ontario Premier League 2

Source: OPL
Rules for classification: 1) Total wins; 2) Head-to-head points; 3) Goal differential; 4) Goals for; 5) Away goal differential; 6) Away goals for; 7) Home goal differential; 8) Home goals for; 9) Head-to-head goal differential; 10) Drawing of lots.
(C) Champions; (R) Relegated

=== Promotion playoffs ===
A playoff was played between the 9th placed team in the OPL1 and the 2nd placed team in the OPL2 in a single game for a place in the top tier in 2027.

August 7, 2026	North Toronto Nitros (OPL1 9th place)	6–1	Hamilton United (OPL2 2nd Place)	Toronto, Ontario
8:30 PM	Abreo 24', 27'; De Boer 44', 72'; Tierra Garniss 55'; Flood 75'		Machado 52'	Stadium: Downsview Park #2; Referee: Charlotte Konyer

=== Statistics ===
==== Top goalscorers ====
Does not include promotion/relegation playoffs

Rank	Player	Club	Goals
1	Gabriela Istocki	NDC Ontario	10
1	Olivia Brown	Guelph United FC	10
3	Alyssa McLeod	NDC Ontario	9
3	Ashley Campbell	Simcoe County Rovers FC	9
3	Stefanie Young	Simcoe County Rovers FC	9
6	Elise Bell	Guelph United FC	7
6	Mia Bosch	FC London	7
6	Yasmin Castillo	Scrosoppi FC	7
9	Ailish Hennessy	NDC Ontario	6
9	Joanna Abdelmalak	Vaughan Azzurri	6
9	Kaiden Sherwood	Waterloo United	6
9	Sabrina Bisante	Simcoe County Rovers FC	6

Source: OPL

=== League Honours ===
==== Awards ====
Award	Player	Team	Ref
Most Valuable Player	Hannah Chown	Simcoe County Rovers FC	
Young Player of the Year (U20)	Alyssa McLeod	NDC Ontario	
Coach of the Year	Zach Wilson	Simcoe County Rovers FC	
Goalkeeper of the Year	Marilena Spagnolo	Simcoe County Rovers FC	
Defender of the Year	Hannah Chown	Simcoe County Rovers FC	
Midfielder of the Year	Stefanie Young	Simcoe County Rovers FV	
Forward of the Year	Alyssa McLeod	NDC Ontario	
Golden Boot (Top Scorer)	Gabriela Istocki; Olivia Brown	NDC Ontario; Guelph United FC	

==== League All-Stars ====
The following players were named league All-Stars.

First Team All-Stars

Player	Position
Marilena Spagnolo (Simcoe County Rovers)	Goalkeeper
Hannah Chown (Simcoe County Rovers)	Defender
Paige Rueffer (NDC Ontario)	Defender
Abbey Simpson (North Toronto Nitros)	Defender
Ecana Eyubeh (Scrosoppi FC)	Defender
Gabriela Istocki (NDC Ontario)	Midfielder
Stefani Young (Simcoe County Rovers)	Midfielder
Emma Reda (NDC Ontario)	Midfielder
Ashley Campbell (North Toronto Nitros)	Forward
Alyssa McLeod (NDC Ontario)	Forward
Olivia Rizakos (Guelph United)	Forward

Second Team All-Stars

Player	Position
Joanna Mazier (Guelph United FC)	Goalkeeper
Ida Miceli (Woodbridge Strikers)	Defender
Iris Oppong (NDC Ontario)	Defender
Shalagh Guha (Waterloo United)	Defender
Kate Knafelc (Guelph United FC)	Defender
Teagan Handley (Simcoe County Rovers)	Midfielder
Grace Hannaford (Guelph United FC)	Midfielder
Jaya Lecky (Scrosoppi FC)	Midfielder
Sophia Cabral (Waterloo United)	Forward
Mia Bosch (FC London)	Forward
Maia Torelli (Vaughan Azzurri)	Forward

== Ontario Premier League 2 ==
Ontario Premier League 2
- Season: 2026
- Dates: April 17 – August 23
- Champions: Pickering FC

Ontario Premier League 2 is composed of 10 teams, eight of those returning from the 2026 season. Alliance United FC was initially relegated from the Premier division, but withdrew from the league and sold their license to International FC who replace them in the division. Cambridge United joined after being promoted from the League2 division.

The first place team in the standings was automatically promoted to the OPL1 for 2027, while the second-place finisher advanced to the promotion playoffs against the 9th-place finisher in the OPL1. The last place team was relegated to the OPL3 for 2027.

=== Clubs ===
Ontario Premier League 2
Team	City	Principal stadium	Head coach
Burlington SC	Burlington	Corpus Christi CSS	Neil Wilson
Cambridge United	Cambridge	Fountain Street Soccer Complex	
Hamilton United	Hamilton	Ron Joyce Stadium (McMaster University)	Carmine Lancia
International FC	Thornhill (Vaughan)	Zanchin Automotive Soccer Centre	
Oakville SC	Oakville	Bronte Athletic Park	Garrett Peters
Pickering FC	Pickering	Pickering Soccer Centre/Kinsmen Park	Peter Hogg
Rush Canada	Oakville	River Oaks Park	Michael Di Blasio
Tecumseh United FC	Tecumseh	Académie Ste. Cécile International School	James Lambourne
Unionville Milliken SC	Unionville (Markham)	Ontario Soccer Centre	Alex Morales
Whitby FC	Whitby	Telus Dome	Rich Hirst

=== Standings ===
Pos	Team	Pld	W	D	L	GF	GA	GD	Pts	Qualification or relegation
1	Pickering FC (C, P)	18	15	2	1	48	9	+39	47	Promotion to Ontario Premier League 1
2	Hamilton United	18	10	6	2	40	12	+28	36	Qualification to promotion playoffs
3	Whitby FC	18	10	5	3	31	12	+19	35	
4	Oakville SC	18	7	7	4	31	18	+13	28	
5	Tecumseh United FC	18	8	3	7	30	23	+7	27	
6	Cambridge United	18	6	4	8	27	27	0	22	
7	Rush Canada SA	18	5	5	8	35	30	+5	20	
8	Burlington SC	18	3	5	10	17	40	−23	14	
9	International FC	18	4	1	13	23	59	−36	13	
10	Unionville Milliken SC (R)	18	2	2	14	19	71	−52	8	Relegation to Ontario Premier League 3

Source: OPL
Rules for classification: 1) Total wins; 2) Head-to-head points; 3) Goal differential; 4) Goals for; 5) Away goal differential; 6) Away goals for; 7) Home goal differential; 8) Home goals for; 9) Head-to-head goal differential; 10) Drawing of lots.
(C) Champions; (P) Promoted; (R) Relegated

=== Statistics ===
==== Top goalscorers ====
Does not include playoffs

Rank	Player	Club	Goals
1	Brianne Desa	Pickering FC	10
1	Nassima Benmessaoud	Oakville SC	10
3	Della Weir	Rush Canada SA	9
4	Ava Mills	International FC	8
4	Madison Mariani	Rush Canada SA	8
6	Anna Pozzi	Tecumseh United FC	7
6	Caitlyn Gratton	Hamilton United	7
6	Hope Windebank	Pickering FC	7
6	Ines Delhomelle	Unionville Milliken SC	7
10	Brianna Henry	Hamilton United	6
10	Lauren Illman	Whitby FC	6

Source: OPL

=== League Honours ===
==== Awards ====
Award	Player	Team	Ref
Most Valuable Player	Brianne Desa	Pickering FC	
Young Player of the Year (U20)	Madeleine Boucher	Hamilton United	
Coach of the Year	Peter Hogg	Pickering FC	
Goalkeeper of the Year	Madeleine Boucher	Hamilton United	
Defender of the Year	Claire Pozzi	Tecumseh United	
Midfielder of the Year	Brianne Desa	Pickering FC	
Forward of the Year	Hope Windebank	Pickering FC	
Golden Boot (Top Scorer)	Brianne Desa	Pickering FC	

==== League All-Stars ====
The following players were named league All-Stars for the 2026 season:

First Team All-Stars

Player	Position
Madeleine Boucher (Hamilton United)	Goalkeeper
Claire Pozzi (Tecumseh United)	Defender
Emily Cirone (Whitby FC)	Defender
Alexis Wilson (Pickering FC)	Defender
Abi Russell (Oakville SC)	Defender
Rebekah Lee (Hamilton United)	Midfielder
Brianne Desa (Pickering FC)	Midfielder
Tori Chia (Whitby FC)	Midfielder
Ava Mills (International FC)	Forward
Hope Windebank (Pickering FC)	Forward
Nassima Benmessaoud (Oakville SC)	Forward

Second Team All-Stars

Player	Position
Hunter Jones (Pickering FC)	Goalkeeper
Grace Tawil (Hamilton United)	Defender
Autumn Allen (Tecumseh United)	Defender
Megan Heyes (Cambridge United)	Defender
Nikolina Rupcich (Rush Canada)	Defender
Brynn Jurus (Hamilton United)	Midfielder
Jane Pozzi (Tecumseh United)	Midfielder
Carolina Grzesniak (Pickering FC)	Midfielder
Ines Delhomelle (Rush Canada)	Forward
Caitlyn Gratton (Hamilton United)	Forward
Sienna Caesar (Burlington SC)	Forward

== Ontario Premier League 3 ==
Ontario Premier League 3
- Season: 2026
- Dates: April 19 – July 27
- Champions: St. Catharines Roma Wolves

Ontario Premier League 3 clubs was divided in three regional conferences (unlike previous seasons which consisted of two conferences). Those clubs were "A" teams that have not earned promotion to higher division, the "B" teams of OPL1 and OPL2 clubs, or newly licensed clubs. Kingston Sentinels and Richmond Hill SC join as expansion teams.

The winner of each division, as well as the best second-place finisher advanced to the OPL3 Playoffs. The winner of the playoffs earned promotion to the OPL2 division. If the winner of the playoffs is a B team, they may decline promotion, and instead the top two A teams with the most regular-season points in the division met in a playoff to earn promotion.

=== Northeast Conference ===
Pos	Team	Pld	W	D	L	GF	GA	GD	Pts	Qualification or relegation
1	Simcoe County Rovers FC B	14	13	0	1	42	14	+28	39	Qualification to promotion playoffs and OPL3 finals
2	Pickering FC B	14	11	1	2	46	9	+37	34	Qualification to promotion playoffs and OPL3 finals
3	North Toronto Nitros B	14	9	1	4	34	10	+24	28	
4	Kingston Sentinels	14	7	3	4	29	15	+14	24	
5	Whitby FC B	14	5	1	8	27	22	+5	16	
6	Unionville Milliken SC B	14	4	1	9	31	44	−13	13	
7	Master's FA	14	2	1	11	18	54	−36	7	
8	International FC B	14	1	0	13	8	67	−59	3	

Source: OPL
Rules for classification: 1) Total wins; 2) Head-to-head points; 3) Goal differential; 4) Goals for; 5) Away goal differential; 6) Away goals for; 7) Home goal differential; 8) Home goals for; 9) Head-to-head goal differential; 10) Drawing of lots.

=== Central Conference ===
Pos	Team	Pld	W	D	L	GF	GA	GD	Pts	Qualification or relegation
1	Woodbridge Strikers B	14	14	0	0	47	12	+35	42	Qualification to promotion play-offs and OPL3 finals
2	Vaughan Azzurri B	14	9	4	1	30	15	+15	31	
3	Rush Canada SA B	14	6	2	6	29	21	+8	20	
4	Oakville SC B	14	6	2	6	22	18	+4	20	
5	Richmond Hill SC	14	4	5	5	26	37	−11	17	
6	Sudbury Cyclones	14	4	3	7	22	27	−5	15	
7	North Mississauga SC B	14	4	2	8	15	28	−13	14	
8	Burlington SC B	14	2	3	9	19	30	−11	9	
9	Scrosoppi FC B	14	2	3	9	17	39	−22	9	

Source: OPL
Rules for classification: 1) Total wins; 2) Goal differential; 3) Goals for; 4) Away goal differential; 5) Away goals for; 6) Home goal differential; 7) Home goals for; 8) Head-to-head points; 9) Head-to-head goal differential; 10) Drawing of lots.

=== Southwest Conference ===
Pos	Team	Pld	W	D	L	GF	GA	GD	Pts	Qualification or relegation
1	St. Catharines Roma Wolves (C, P)	14	13	1	0	57	14	+43	40	Qualification to promotion play-offs and OPL3 finals
2	Railway City FC	14	9	2	3	41	19	+22	29	
3	Waterloo United B	14	9	2	3	37	19	+18	29	
4	FC London B	14	6	3	5	36	27	+9	21	
5	Tecumseh United FC B	14	5	3	6	20	37	−17	18	
6	Guelph United B	14	3	4	7	20	27	−7	13	
7	Hamilton United B	14	1	2	11	11	40	−29	5	
8	Cambridge United B	14	1	1	12	13	52	−39	4	

Source: OPL
Rules for classification: 1) Total wins; 2) Head-to-head points; 3) Goal differential; 4) Goals for; 5) Away goal differential; 6) Away goals for; 7) Home goal differential; 8) Home goals for; 9) Head-to-head goal differential; 10) Drawing of lots.
(C) Champions; (P) Promoted

=== Ontario Premier League 3 Finals ===
Semifinals; July 28–29
SW1	St. Catharines Roma Wolves	5
NE1	Simcoe County Rovers FC B	1
C1	Woodbridge Strikers B	1 (6)
WC	Pickering FC B (p)	1 (7)

Championship Game; August 2
SW1	St. Catharines Roma Wolves	4
WC	Pickering FC B	1

=== Statistics ===
==== Top goalscorers ====
Does not include playoffs

Rank	Player	Club	Goals
1	Demi Maroudas	St. Catharines Roma Wolves	20
2	Aya Naamani	Waterloo United B	15
3	Kimee Liu	Railway City FC	12
4	Arianna Zumpano	St. Catharines Roma Wolves	11
4	Naomi Atem	Richmond Hill SC	11
6	Alexaudria Chasles	Woodbridge Strikers B	10
6	Jasmine McCatty	Simcoe County Rovers FC	10
6	Jasmyn Clarke	Pickering FC B	10
6	Kiara Levac	Sudbury Cyclones	10
6	Mara Stanistreet	Kingston Sentinels	10

Source: OPL

=== League Honours ===
==== Awards ====
Award	Northeast Division	Central Division	Southwest Division	Ref
Most Valuable Player	Jasmine McCatty (Simcoe County Rovers B)	Brooklyn Lupinacci (Woodbridge Strikers B)	Demi Maroudas (St. Catharines Roma Wolves)	
Coach of the Year	Daire O'Brien (North Toronto Nitros B)	Mike Stalteri (Woodbridge Strikers B)	Francesco Carriero (St. Catharines Roma Wolves)	
Goalkeeper of the Year	Brianna West (Kingston Sentinels)	Angela Volpe (Woodbridge Strikers B)	Emma Hendrie (St. Catharines Roma Wolves)	
Defender of the Year	Paige Bryant (North Toronto Nitros B)	Vanessa Dias (Vaughan Azzurri B)	Mia Di Pasquale (St. Catharines Roma Wolves)	
Midfielder of the Year	Erica Tsang (Simcoe County Rovers B)	Alexis Cordeiro (Woodbridge Strikers B)	Kimee Liu (Railway City FC)	
Forward of the Year	Sage Thomas-Roberts (Master's FA)	Isabella Torelli (Vaughan Azzurri B)	Demi Maroudas (St. Catharines Roma Wolves)	
Golden Boot (Top Scorer)	Jasmine McCatty (Simcoe County Rovers B)	Naomi Atem (Richmond Hill SC)	Demi Maroudas (St. Catharines Roma Wolves)	

== OPL Cup ==
The OPL Cup is a league cup tournament that is contested by A teams from all three tiers of Ontario Premier League.

All 26 "A" teams participated in the five-round knockout competition, which is played concurrently with the league season. Twenty clubs entered the first round (four clubs from OPL1, all ten clubs from OPL2, and the six A teams from OPL3), while six clubs from the OPL1 received a bye to the round of 16.

The league initially did a draw to determine the Round 1 and 2 matchups only. Ahead of the third round, a second draw was held to determine the remaining matchups. The bracket below combines the two draws into one.

=== Bracket ===
- First Round
- April 7 – 12

- Round of 16
- April 29 – May 12

- Quarterfinals
- May 20 – 27

- Semifinals
- June 24

- Final
- July 22

OPL2
Burlington SC
1

OPL1
Scrosoppi FC
3

OPL1
Scrosoppi FC
0

OPL2
Hamilton United
3

OPL2
Whitby FC
0

OPL2
Hamilton United
1

OPL2
Hamilton United
1(3)

OPL1
Waterloo United
1(2)

OPL1
Waterloo United
1

OPL2
Oakville SC
0

OPL2
Oakville SC
2(3)

OPL2
Pickering FC
2(0)

OPL2
Hamilton United
1

OPL1
Vaughan Azzurri
0

OPL1
Vaughan Azzurri
9

OPL1
North Mississauga SC
1

OPL3
Railway City FC
2(1)

OPL1
North Mississauga SC
2(3)

OPL1
Vaughan Azzurri
1

OPL1
Simcoe County Rovers FC
0

OPL1
Simcoe County Rovers FC
6

OPL3
Sudbury Cyclones
0

OPL2
Rush Canada SA
0

OPL3
Sudbury Cyclones
1

OPL2
Hamilton United
0

OPL1
Guelph United FC
5

OPL1
Guelph United FC
3

OPL2
Tecumseh United FC
1

OPL2
Tecumseh United FC
2

OPL3
St. Catharines Roma Wolves
1

OPL1
Guelph United FC
1(5)

OPL1
NDC Ontario
1(3)

OPL1
NDC Ontario
4

OPL2
International FC
0

OPL3
Master's FA
2(3)

OPL2
International FC
2(4)

OPL1
Guelph United FC
5

OPL1
Woodbridge Strikers
1

OPL2
FC London
5

OPL3
Richmond Hill SC
1

OPL2
FC London
2

OPL3
Kingston Sentinels
1

OPL2
Unionville Milliken SC
2

OPL3
Kingston Sentinels
3

OPL1
FC London
0

OPL1
Woodbridge Strikers
2

OPL1
North Toronto Nitros
0

OPL1
Woodbridge Strikers
1

OPL1
Woodbridge Strikers
2

OPL2
Cambridge United
1

== U20 Reserve Division ==
The league continued to operate a reserve division The reserve division was split into regional conferences. It is not part of the regular pyramid and teams are not eligible for promotion.

=== Northeast Conference ===
Pos	Team	Pld	W	D	L	GF	GA	GD	Pts	Qualification or relegation
1	North Toronto Nitros U20	14	11	2	1	45	13	+32	35	Qualification to playoffs
2	Master's FA U20	14	8	3	3	32	19	+13	27	
3	Pickering FC U20	14	8	1	5	34	18	+16	25	
4	Whitby FC U20	14	6	1	7	22	26	−4	19	
5	Unionville Milliken SC U20	14	2	3	9	18	35	−17	9	
6	Richmond Hill SC U20	14	1	2	11	6	46	−40	5	

Source: OPL
Rules for classification: 1) Total wins; 2) Head-to-head points; 3) Goal differential; 4) Goals for; 5) Away goal differential; 6) Away goals for; 7) Home goal differential; 8) Home goals for; 9) Head-to-head goal differential; 10) Drawing of lots.

=== Central Conference ===
Pos	Team	Pld	W	D	L	GF	GA	GD	Pts	Qualification or relegation
1	Woodbridge Strikers U20	14	12	2	0	39	8	+31	38	Qualification to playoffs
2	Oakville SC U20	14	9	3	2	37	12	+25	30	Qualification to playoffs
3	Vaughan Azzurri U20	14	6	1	7	32	26	+6	19	
4	Hamilton United U20 Central	14	4	2	8	20	50	−30	14	
5	North Mississauga SC U20	14	3	5	6	17	22	−5	14	
6	Simcoe County Rovers FC U20	14	0	3	11	11	38	−27	3	

Source: OPL
Rules for classification: 1) Total wins; 2) Head-to-head points; 3) Goal differential; 4) Goals for; 5) Away goal differential; 6) Away goals for; 7) Home goal differential; 8) Home goals for; 9) Head-to-head goal differential; 10) Drawing of lots.

=== Southwest Conference ===
Pos	Team	Pld	W	D	L	GF	GA	GD	Pts	Qualification or relegation
1	Burlington SC U20 (C)	14	9	2	3	24	17	+7	29	Qualification to playoffs
2	Guelph United U20	14	7	4	3	24	20	+4	25	
3	Hamilton United U20 Southwest	14	7	1	6	29	22	+7	22	
4	Railway City FC U20	14	5	4	5	25	19	+6	19	
5	Rush Canada SA U20	14	4	2	8	14	28	−14	14	
6	St. Catharines Roma Wolves U20	14	2	3	9	14	24	−10	9	

Source: OPL
Rules for classification: 1) Total wins; 2) Head-to-head points; 3) Goal differential; 4) Goals for; 5) Away goal differential; 6) Away goals for; 7) Home goal differential; 8) Home goals for; 9) Head-to-head goal differential; 10) Drawing of lots.
(C) Champions

==== Playoffs ====
The top team in each division plus the best runner-up qualified for the playoffs.

Semifinals; August 5
NE1	North Toronto Nitros U20	1
SW1	Burlington SC U20	2
C1	Woodbridge Strikers U20	1(3)
WC	Oakville SC U20	1(4)

Championship Game; August 10
SW1	Burlington SC U20	2
WC	Oakville SC U20	1
