= 2026 Ontario Premier League season =

Provincial semi-pro league season of Ontario, Canada

Ontario Premier League
- Season: 2026
- Champions: Scrosoppi FC (OPL1); Master's FA (OPL2); Woodbridge Strikers B (OPL3)
- OPL Cup champions: Woodbridge Strikers

The 2026 Ontario Premier League season is the twelfth edition of the Ontario Premier League (and the first since rebranding from League1 Ontario), a division 3 men's soccer league in the Canadian soccer league system and the highest level of soccer based in the Canadian province of Ontario. The league was split into three divisions with promotion and relegation.

The 2026 season inherited the three divisions from the League1 Ontario system but were rebranded as Ontario Premier League 1, Ontario Premier League 2 and Ontario Premier League 3 respectively. The OPL will feature 28 independent clubs, with Kingston Sentinels and Richmond Hill SC joining from the bottom of the system.

The OPL1 and the OPL2 divisions both were composed of 12 clubs, most returning from last season, with the exception of International FC which replaced Alliance United FC in the top division. The OPL3 was made up by three conferences containing total of 28 teams. These were mostly reserve teams with some "A" teams, including two newly licensed clubs.

== Ontario Premier League 1 ==
Ontario Premier League 1
- Season: 2026
- Dates: April 18 – August 23

Ontario Premier League 1 was composed of 12 teams. Unionville Milliken SC and Sudbury Cyclones were promoted from the Championship division last season. Alliance United FC left the league and their licence was bought by International FC.

The 12 teams faced each other twice, once at home and once away for a total of 22 matches. At the end of the season, the club at the top of the standings was crowned as Ontario Premier League champions and gain a berth for the 2027 Canadian Championship. The club that finished 11th advanced to the promotion playoffs against the second-place finisher in the OPL2, while the 12th-placed club was automatically relegated to the OPL2 division.

=== Clubs ===
Ontario Premier League
Team	City	Principal stadium	Head coach
Burlington SC	Burlington	Corpus Christi	Mark Worton
International FC	Thornhill (Vaughan)	Zanchin Automotive Soccer Centre	Mattace Raso
North Toronto Nitros	North York (Toronto)	Downsview Park	Filip Prostran
Oakville SC	Oakville	Sheridan Trafalgar Campus	Duncan Wilde
Scrosoppi FC	Milton	St. Francis Xavier	Patrice Gheisar
Sigma FC	Mississauga	Mississauga Sports and Entertainment Centre / Tim Hortons Field	John Zervos
Simcoe County Rovers FC	Barrie	J.C. Massie Field	Randy Ribiero
St. Catharines Roma Wolves	St. Catharines	Club Roma – Under Armour Field	Federico Turriziani
Sudbury Cyclones	Sudbury	Cambrian College / James Jerome Sports Complex	Joe Politi
Unionville Milliken SC	Unionville (Markham)	Mount Joy	Wais Azizi
Vaughan Azzurri	Vaughan	North Maple Field	Anthony Vadori
Woodbridge Strikers	Woodbridge (Vaughan)	Vaughan Grove Field	Peter Pinizzotto

=== Standings ===
Pos	Team	Pld	W	D	L	GF	GA	GD	Pts	Qualification or relegation
1	Scrosoppi FC (C)	22	16	3	3	66	26	+40	51	2027 Canadian Championship
2	Woodbridge Strikers	22	15	5	2	62	25	+37	50	
3	Oakville SC	22	13	2	7	52	40	+12	41	
4	Vaughan Azzurri	22	12	5	5	50	38	+12	41	
5	Unionville Milliken SC	22	9	10	3	44	25	+19	37	
6	Sigma FC	22	8	5	9	39	43	−4	29	
7	Burlington SC	22	8	4	10	52	52	0	28	
8	North Toronto Nitros	22	8	4	10	39	49	−10	28	
9	St. Catharines Roma Wolves	22	6	5	11	27	37	−10	23	
10	International FC	22	5	5	12	45	56	−11	20	
11	Sudbury Cyclones (R)	22	5	3	14	22	41	−19	18	Qualification to relegation playoffs
12	Simcoe County Rovers FC (R)	22	1	1	20	21	87	−66	4	Relegation to Ontario Premier League 2

Source: OPL
Rules for classification: 1) Total wins; 2) Head-to-head points; 3) Goal differential; 4) Goals for; 5) Away goal differential; 6) Away goals for; 7) Home goal differential; 8) Home goals for; 9) Head-to-head goal differential; 10) Drawing of lots.
(C) Champions; (R) Relegated

=== Promotion playoffs ===
A playoff will be played between the 11th placed team in the OPL1 and the 2nd placed team in the OPL2 in a single game for a place in the top tier in 2027.

August 29, 2026	Sudbury Cyclones (OPL1 11th place)	0–5	Cambridge United (OPL2 2nd place)	Sudbury, Ontario
7:30 PM			Monterrosso 32' (pen.), 37', 45+3' (pen.); Dell 44'; Ferraro 82'	Stadium: James Jerome Sports Complex; Referee: Liam Tremblay

=== Statistics ===
==== Top goalscorers ====
Does not include promotion/relegation playoffs

Rank	Player	Club	Goals
1	Anthony Morano	Woodbridge Strikers	19
2	Jacob Carlos	Scrosoppi FC	14
3	George Akpabio	International FC	13
3	Mohamed Al Shakman	Burlington SC	13
5	Amir Shirazi	Burlington SC	11
5	Augustus Oku	Burlington SC	11
5	Orlendis Benítez	International FC	11
8	Matthew Wrobel	Scrosoppi FC	10
9	Aidan Hugo	North Toronto Nitros	9
9	Brandon Duarte	Oakville SC	9
9	Exosse Kadibue	North Toronto Nitros (Note: Kadiebue played two games with Sudbury Cyclones, but all 9 of his goals came while playing for North Toronto Nitros)	9
9	Kevaughan Tavernier	Sigma FC	9
9	Omari Cotterell	Woodbridge Strikers	9

Source: OPL

=== League Honours ===
==== Awards ====
Award	Player	Team	Ref
Most Valuable Player	Jacob Carlos	Scrosoppi FC	
Young Player of the Year (U20)	Joshua Nicholson	Woodbridge Strikers	
Coach of the Year	Patrice Gheisar	Scrosoppi FC	
Goalkeeper of the Year	Daniel Clarke	Woodbridge Strikers	
Defender of the Year	Alexi Ivanov	Unionville Milliken SC	
Midfielder of the Year	Jacob Carlos	Scrosoppi FC	
Forward of the Year	Anthony Morano	Woodbridge Strikers	
Golden Boot (Top Scorer)	Anthony Morano	Woodbridge Strikers	

==== League All-Stars ====
The following players were named league All-Stars.

First Team All-Stars

Player	Position
Daniel Clarke (Woodbridge Strikers)	Goalkeeper
Daniel Tareke (Woodbridge Strikers)	Defender
Alexi Ivanov (Unionville Milliken SC)	Defender
Noah Bickford (Sigma FC)	Defender
Ethan Hunter (Scrosoppi FC)	Defender
Jacob Carlos (Scrosoppi FC)	Midfielder
Micah Joseph (Unionville Milliken SC)	Midfielder
Jacob Spirazzi (Woodbridge Strikers)	Midfielder
Brandon Duarte (Oakville SC)	Midfielder
Anthony Morano (Woodbridge Strikers)	Forward
Aidan Hugo (North Toronto Nitros)	Forward

Second Team All-Stars

Player	Position
Cuba Grant (Scrosoppi FC)	Goalkeeper
Kyrese Lynch-Bailey (International FC)	Defender
Ilija Pavicic (Sudbury Cyclones)	Defender
Markus Pusztahegyi (Scrosoppi FC)	Defender
Michael Campoli (Vaughan Azzurri)	Defender
Christian Zeppieri (Vaughan Azzurri)	Midfielder
Tadja Vukas (North Toronto Nitros)	Midfielder
Mohamed Al Shakman (Burlington SC)	Midfielder
Fergus Pender (Scrosoppi FC)	Forward
Augustus Oku (Burlington SC)	Forward
João Costa (Scrosoppi FC)	Forward

== Ontario Premier League 2 ==
Ontario Premier League 2
- Season: 2026
- Dates: April 17 – August 23

Ontario Premier League 2 was composed of 12 teams, ten of those returning from the 2025 season. FC London joined after being relegated from the Premier division and Cambridge United joined after being promoted from the League2 division. York United FC Academy rebranded to Inter Toronto II following their CPL side's change of identity.

The first place team in the standings was automatically promoted to the OPL1 for 2027, while the second-place finisher advanced to the promotion playoffs against the 11th-place finisher in the OPL1. The last place team was relegated to the OPL3 for 2027.

=== Clubs ===
Ontario Premier League 2
Team	City	Principal stadium	Head coach
Cambridge United	Cambridge	Fountain Street Soccer Complex	
FC London	London	Tricar Field	Yiannis Tsalatsidis
Guelph United F.C.	Guelph	Centennial Bowl	Alan Koch
Hamilton United	Hamilton	Ron Joyce Stadium	Francesco Cardillo
Inter Toronto II	Toronto	York Lions Stadium	Marco Bonofiglio
Master's FA	Scarborough (Toronto)	L'Amoreaux Sports Complex	Ivan Galarza
North Mississauga SC	Mississauga	Churchill Meadows (Mattamy Sports Park)	Peyvand Mossavat
Pickering FC	Pickering	Pickering Soccer Centre	Eric Polo Soldevila
The Borough FC	Scarborough (Toronto)	Birchmount Stadium	Zico Mahrady
Waterloo United	Waterloo	RIM Park	Michael Marcoccia
Whitby FC	Whitby	Telus Dome	Ramin Mohammadi
Windsor City FC	Windsor	St. Clair College	Gabriel Poulino

=== Standings ===
Pos	Team	Pld	W	D	L	GF	GA	GD	Pts	Qualification or relegation
1	Master's FA (C, P)	22	13	4	5	33	21	+12	43	Promotion to Ontario Premier League 1
2	Cambridge United (P)	22	13	3	6	50	32	+18	42	Qualification to promotion playoffs
3	Windsor City FC	22	12	6	4	51	25	+26	42	
4	Waterloo United	22	12	2	8	40	40	0	38	
5	The Borough FC	22	11	4	7	48	29	+19	37	
6	Whitby FC	22	8	11	3	31	27	+4	35	
7	Pickering FC	22	9	3	10	33	31	+2	30	
8	Inter Toronto II	22	7	7	8	41	48	−7	28	
9	Guelph United FC	22	6	3	13	36	42	−6	21	
10	FC London	22	5	4	13	27	48	−21	19	
11	North Mississauga SC	22	4	6	12	22	45	−23	18	
12	Hamilton United (R)	22	5	1	16	26	50	−24	16	Relegation to Ontario Premier League 3

Source: OPL
Rules for classification: 1) Total wins; 2) Head-to-head points; 3) Goal differential; 4) Goals for; 5) Away goal differential; 6) Away goals for; 7) Home goal differential; 8) Home goals for; 9) Head-to-head goal differential; 10) Drawing of lots.
(C) Champions; (P) Promoted; (R) Relegated

=== Statistics ===
==== Top goalscorers ====
Does not include promotion/relegation playoffs

Rank	Player	Club	Goals
1	Nigel Buckley	The Borough FC	20
2	Ciaran O'Connor	Windsor City FC	16
3	Ali Ahmad	Waterloo United	11
3	Songmafolo Coulibay	Windsor City FC	11
5	Kyler Monterrosso	Cambridge United	8
5	Matthew Ciavarro	Cambridge United	8
5	Nikolas Antolcic	Cambridge United	8
5	Ty Clarke	Inter Toronto FC II	8
9	Brett Springer	Waterloo United	7
9	Erion Metaj	Whitby FC	7
9	Fadell Sore	Hamilton United	7
9	Omar Soufan	Windsor City FC	7
9	Samuel Barrowcliffe	Waterloo United	7

Source: OPL

=== League Honours ===
==== Awards ====
Award	Player	Team	Ref
Most Valuable Player	Terrell Spencer	Master's FA	
Young Player of the Year (U20)	Evan Antolcic	Cambridge United	
Coach of the Year	Gabriel Poulino	Windsor City FC	
Goalkeeper of the Year	Ile Naumoski	Master's FA	
Defender of the Year	Amardo Oakley	Guelph United FC	
Midfielder of the Year	Ali Ahmad	Waterloo United	
Forward of the Year	Nigel Buckley	The Borough FC	
Golden Boot (Top Scorer)	Nigel Buckley	The Borough FC	

==== League All-Stars ====
The following players were named league All-Stars.

First Team All-Stars

Player	Position
Ile Naumoski (Master's FA)	Goalkeeper
Terrell Spencer (Master's FA)	Defender
Tristan Pusztahegyi (Waterloo United)	Defender
Amardo Oakley (Guelph United FC)	Defender
Jason Alvarado (Master's FA)	Defender
Diadie Traore (The Borough FC)	Midfielder
Nikolas Antolcic (Cambridge United)	Midfielder
Ali Ahmad (Waterloo United)	Midfielder
Erion Metaj (Whitby FC)	Forward
Ciaaran O'Connor (Windsor City FC)	Forward
Nigel Buckley (The Borough FC)	Forward

Second Team All-Stars

Player	Position
Benjamin Choudhry (Pickering FC)	Goalkeeper
DeAndre Branch (Master's FA)	Defender
Callum Heimbecker (Cambridge United)	Defender
Moustapha Kamate (Windsor City FC)	Defender
Gabriel Dorogan (The Borough FC)	Defender
Evan Antolcic (Cambridge United)	Midfielder
Jefferson Bosiakali (Windsor City FC)	Midfielder
Daniel Avila (Master's FA)	Midfielder
Jack Sears (Whitby FC)	Midfielder
Songmafolio Coulibay (Windsor City FC)	Forward
Aylon Yshaia (Inter Toronto II)	Forward

== Ontario Premier League 3 ==
Ontario Premier League 3
- Season: 2026
- Dates: April 19 – July 27

Ontario Premier League 3 clubs was divided into three regional conferences: "A" teams for which there was not room in the higher leagues, the "B" teams of OPL1 and OPL2 clubs, or newly licensed clubs. Kingston Sentinels and Richmond Hill SC joined as expansion teams.

The winner of each division, as well as the best second-place finisher advanced to the OPL3 playoffs. The winner of the playoffs earned promotion to the OPL2 division. If the winner of the playoffs is a B team, they may decline promotion, and instead the top two A teams with the most regular-season points in the division would meet in a playoff to earn promotion.

=== Northeast Conference ===
Pos	Team	Pld	W	D	L	GF	GA	GD	Pts	Qualification
1	The Borough FC B	14	11	3	0	45	22	+23	36	Qualification to promotion playoffs and OPL3 finals
2	Kingston Sentinels (P)	14	11	2	1	46	13	+33	35	Qualification to promotion playoffs and OPL3 finals
3	Whitby FC B	14	8	2	4	29	19	+10	26	
4	Richmond Hill SC	14	5	5	4	23	24	−1	20	
5	Unionville Milliken SC B	14	5	1	8	33	31	+2	16	
6	International FC B	14	4	1	9	27	49	−22	13	
7	Pickering FC B	14	3	1	10	14	36	−22	10	
8	Master's FA B	14	1	1	12	17	40	−23	4	

Source: OPL
Rules for classification: 1) Total wins; 2) Head-to-head points; 3) Goal differential; 4) Goals for; 5) Away goal differential; 6) Away goals for; 7) Home goal differential; 8) Home goals for; 9) Head-to-head goal differential; 10) Drawing of lots.
(P) Promoted

=== Central Conference ===
Pos	Team	Pld	W	D	L	GF	GA	GD	Pts	Qualification
1	Woodbridge Strikers B (C)	14	9	5	0	54	21	+33	32	Qualification to promotion play-offs and OPL3 finals
2	Vaughan Azzurri B	14	9	1	4	37	27	+10	28	
3	North Toronto Nitros B	14	8	3	3	27	20	+7	27	
4	Rush Canada SA	14	7	4	3	43	16	+27	25	
5	Scrosoppi FC B	14	7	1	6	29	26	+3	22	
6	Inter Toronto III	14	6	2	6	35	34	+1	20	
7	Sigma FC B	14	6	1	7	22	23	−1	19	
8	Sudbury Cyclones B	14	6	1	7	34	41	−7	19	
9	Simcoe County Rovers FC B	14	1	2	11	10	37	−27	5	
10	North Mississauga SC B	14	0	2	12	9	55	−46	2	

Source: OPL
Rules for classification: 1) Total wins; 2) Goal differential; 3) Goals for; 4) Away goal differential; 5) Away goals for; 6) Home goal differential; 7) Home goals for; 8) Head-to-head points; 9) Head-to-head goal differential; 10) Drawing of lots.
(C) Champions

=== Southwest Conference ===
Pos	Team	Pld	W	D	L	GF	GA	GD	Pts	Qualification
1	Railway City FC	14	10	2	2	47	16	+31	32	Qualification to promotion play-offs and OPL3 finals
2	Burlington SC B	14	9	3	2	52	23	+29	30	
3	Oakville SC B	14	8	3	3	36	15	+21	27	
4	Cambridge United B	14	7	4	3	32	20	+12	25	
5	St. Catharines Roma Wolves B	14	5	4	5	32	29	+3	19	
6	Waterloo United B	14	5	4	5	30	36	−6	19	
7	Hamilton United B	14	5	2	7	15	22	−7	17	
8	FC London B	14	3	5	6	27	35	−8	14	
9	Windsor City FC B	14	1	4	9	15	47	−32	7	
10	Guelph United B	14	0	3	11	11	54	−43	3	

Source: OPL
Rules for classification: 1) Total wins; 2) Goal differential; 3) Goals for; 4) Away goal differential; 5) Away goals for; 6) Home goal differential; 7) Home goals for; 8) Head-to-head points; 9) Head-to-head goal differential; 10) Drawing of lots.

=== Ontario Premier League 3 Finals ===
Semifinals; July 27
NE1	The Borough FC B	2 (9) (Note: With the score tied 2–2, the match was stopped due to lightning during second-half stoppage time. To decide a winner, a penalty shootout was held on August 1, immediately preceding the final.)
WC	Kingston Sentinels	2 (8)
SW1	Railway City FC	2
C1	Woodbridge Strikers B	3

Championship Game; August 1
NE1	The Borough FC B	0
C1	Woodbridge Strikers B	2

=== Promotion playoffs ===
Woodbridge Strikers B declined the promotion spot to Ontario Premier League 2. As such, per league rules, a promotion playoff match was scheduled between the two A teams with the most points during the regular season to replace them (Kingston Sentinels and Railway City FC).

August 9, 2026	Kingston Sentinels	3–1 (a.e.t.)	Railway City FC	Kingston, Ontario
5:00 PM	Ball 56', 102' (pen.), 117'		Kemmerling 6'	Stadium: CaraCo Home Field; Referee: Laurent Cousineau

=== Statistics ===
==== Top goalscorers ====
Does not include playoffs

Rank	Player	Club	Goals
1	Jacob Ball	Kingston Sentinels	18
2	Stelio Katsoris	The Borough FC B	15
2	Sam Howard	Sudbury Cyclones B	15
4	Aidan Robichaud	Burlington SC B	14
4	Cristian Alfieri	Burlington SC B	14
6	Luca Priolo	Vaughan Azzurri B	10
7	Gianluca Vecchiarelli	Woodbridge Strikers B	9
7	Ifechukwudei Nkabu	Woodbridge Strikers B	9
7	Patrick Aponowicz	Rush Canada SA	9
10	Andy Zhang	Unionville Milliken SC B	8
10	Oliver Barta	Rush Canada SA	8

Source: OPL

=== League Honours ===
==== Awards ====
Award	Northeast Division	Central Division	Southwest Division	Ref
Most Valuable Player	Jacob Ball (Kingston Sentinels)	Christian Rotundo (Woodbridge Strikers B)	AJ Robichaud (Burlington SC B)	
Coach of the Year	Christian Hoefler (Kingston Sentinels)	Paul Stalteri (Woodbridge Strikers B)	Tristan Joyce (Burlington SC B)	
Goalkeeper of the Year	Kevin Snee (Kingston Sentinels)	Nicholas Turchiaro (Woodbridge Striekrs B)	Lorin-Alexander Lopez (Cambridge United B)	
Defender of the Year	Luke Green (Kingston Sentinels)	Anthony Frasca (Woodbridge Strikers B)	Julian Srock (Oakville SC B)	
Midfielder of the Year	Caellum Gray (The Borough FC B)	Christian Rotundo (Woodbridge Strikers B)	Gabriel Plaza Berry (Hamilton United B)	
Forward of the Year	Jacob Ball (Kingston Sentinels)	Gianluca Vecchiarelli (Woodbridge Strikers B)	AJ Robichaud (Burlington SC B)	
Golden Boot (Top Scorer)	Jacob Ball (Kingston Sentinels)	Sam Howard (Sudbury Cyclones B)	AJ Robichaud (Burlington SC B)	

== Ontario Premier League Cup ==
The OPL Cup (formerly known as the L1 Cup) is a league cup tournament contested by A teams from all three tiers of Ontario Premier League.

All 28 "A" teams participated in the five-round knockout competition, which was played concurrently with the league season. Twenty-four clubs entered the first round (eight clubs from OPL1, all twelve clubs from OP2, and the four A teams from OPL3), while four clubs from the OPL1 received a bye to the round of 16.

The league initially conducted a draw to determine the Round 1 and 2 matchups only. Ahead of the third round, a second draw was held to determine the remaining matchups. The bracket below combines the two draws into one.

=== Bracket ===
- First Round
- April 7–11

- Round of 16
- April 28 – May 13

- Quarterfinals
- June 2–3

- Semifinals
- July 8

- Final
- August 19

OPL1
Unionville Milliken SC
6

OPL3
Kingston Sentinels
1

OPL1
Unionville Milliken SC
0

OPL2
Guelph United FC
5

OPL3
Railway City FC
1(6)

OPL2
Guelph United FC
1(7)

OPL2
Guelph United FC
1

OPL2
Master's FA
2

OPL1
International FC
2

OPL2
Master's FA
3

OPL2
Master's FA
2

OPL1
North Toronto Nitros
1

OPL1
North Toronto Nitros
3

OPL3
Rush Canada SA
0

OPL2
Master's FA
1(5)

OPL2
Waterloo United
1(4)

OPL2
Hamilton United
0

OPL1
Sudbury Cyclones
1

OPL1
Sudbury Cyclones
0

OPL2
Waterloo United
1

OPL2
Waterloo United
3

OPL1
Simcoe County Rovers FC
2

OPL2
Waterloo United
4

OPL1
St. Catharines Roma Wolves
1

OPL2
FC London
2

OPL1
Oakville SC
3

OPL1
Oakville SC
0

OPL1
St. Catharines Roma Wolves
3

OPL1
St. Catharines Roma Wolves
4

OPL3
Richmond Hill SC
1

OPL2
Master's FA
2

OPL1
Woodbridge Strikers
3

OPL1
Vaughan Azzurri
5

OPL2
Pickering FC
0

OPL2
Pickering FC
1

OPL2
Windsor City FC
0

OPL1
Vaughan Azzurri
1

OPL2
Cambridge United
3

OPL1
Scrosoppi FC
3(3)

OPL2
Cambridge United
3(4)

OPL2
Cambridge United
1

OPL2
Inter Toronto FC II
0

OPL2
Cambridge United
0(7)

OPL1
Woodbridge Strikers
0(8)

OPL1
Woodbridge Strikers
1(10)

OPL2
The Borough FC
1(9)

OPL2
Whitby FC
0

OPL2
The Borough FC
4

OPL1
Woodbridge Strikers
1(5)

OPL1
Burlington SC
1(4)

OPL1
Burlington SC
11

OPL2
North Mississauga SC
0

OPL1
Sigma FC
1

OPL2
North Mississauga SC
3

== U20 Reserve Division ==
The league operates a reserve division. The reserve division was split into regional conferences. It is not part of the regular pyramid and teams are not eligible for promotion.

=== Summer Division ===
==== Northeast Conference ====
Pos	Team	Pld	W	D	L	GF	GA	GD	Pts	Qualification
1	Unionville Milliken SC U20	14	11	1	2	43	18	+25	34	Qualification to playoffs
2	Kingston Sentinels U20	14	9	1	4	35	18	+17	28	
3	Richmond Hill SC U20	14	9	1	4	22	21	+1	28	
4	The Borough FC U20 Northeast	14	9	0	5	33	26	+7	27	
5	Whitby FC U20	14	6	3	5	28	24	+4	21	
6	Master's FA U20	14	6	1	7	27	26	+1	19	
7	Inter Toronto IV	14	3	5	6	28	29	−1	14	
8	Simcoe County Rovers FC U20	14	4	1	9	17	36	−19	13	
9	International FC U20	14	3	4	7	16	20	−4	13	
10	Pickering FC U20	14	1	1	12	14	45	−31	4	

Source: OPL
Rules for classification: 1) Total wins; 2) Goal differential; 3) Goals for; 4) Away goal differential; 5) Away goals for; 6) Home goal differential; 7) Home goals for; 8) Head-to-head points; 9) Head-to-head goal differential; 10) Drawing of lots.

==== Central Conference ====
Pos	Team	Pld	W	D	L	GF	GA	GD	Pts	Qualification
1	Woodbridge Strikers U20 (C)	14	10	3	1	58	22	+36	33	Qualification to playoffs
2	North Toronto Nitros U20	14	10	1	3	38	16	+22	31	Qualification to playoffs
3	Vaughan Azzurri U20	14	9	3	2	58	20	+38	30	
4	Burlington SC U20 Central	14	7	2	5	37	32	+5	23	
5	Hamilton United U20 Central	14	7	0	7	34	44	−10	21	
6	Oakville SC U20	14	6	1	7	38	40	−2	19	
7	Sigma FC U20	14	5	3	6	26	34	−8	18	
8	Rush Canada SA U20	14	4	1	9	31	41	−10	13	
9	The Borough FC U20 Central	14	3	1	10	16	33	−17	10	
10	North Mississauga SC U20	14	1	1	12	13	67	−54	4	

Source: OPL
Rules for classification: 1) Total wins; 2) Goal differential; 3) Goals for; 4) Away goal differential; 5) Away goals for; 6) Home goal differential; 7) Home goals for; 8) Head-to-head points; 9) Head-to-head goal differential; 10) Drawing of lots.
(C) Champions

==== Southwest Conference ====
Pos	Team	Pld	W	D	L	GF	GA	GD	Pts	Qualification
1	Scrosoppi FC U20	14	10	4	0	44	19	+25	34	Qualification to playoffs
2	Railway City FC U20	14	8	3	3	40	18	+22	27	
3	St. Catharines Roma Wolves U20	14	7	3	4	37	24	+13	24	
4	Cambridge United U20	14	7	2	5	26	16	+10	23	
5	Hamilton United U20 Southwest	14	7	1	6	35	35	0	22	
6	Waterloo United U20	14	6	2	6	23	29	−6	20	
7	FC London U20	14	5	4	5	31	25	+6	19	
8	Guelph United U20	14	4	3	7	25	38	−13	15	
9	Burlington SC U20 Southwest	14	3	3	8	21	43	−22	12	
10	Windsor City FC U20	14	0	1	13	20	55	−35	1	

Source: OPL
Rules for classification: 1) Total wins; 2) Goal differential; 3) Goals for; 4) Away goal differential; 5) Away goals for; 6) Home goal differential; 7) Home goals for; 8) Head-to-head points; 9) Head-to-head goal differential; 10) Drawing of lots.

===== Playoffs =====
The top team in each division plus the best runner-up qualified for the playoffs.

Semifinals; August 4
SW1	Scrosoppi FC U20	2(3)
C1	Woodbridge Strikers U20	2(5)
NE1	Unionville Milliken SC U20	1
WC	North Toronto Nitros U20	5

Championship Game; August 12
C1	Woodbridge Strikers U20	2
WC	North Toronto Nitros U20	1

=== Fall Division ===
Pos	Team	Pld	W	D	L	GF	GA	GD	Pts	Qualification
1	Richmond Hill SC U20	10	8	2	0	37	11	+26	26	Qualification to playoffs
2	The Borough FC U20	10	7	1	2	32	13	+19	22	Qualification to playoffs
3	Inter Toronto U20 Blue (C)	10	6	1	3	47	15	+32	19	Qualification to playoffs
4	FC London U20	10	5	3	2	26	18	+8	18	Qualification to playoffs
5	Waterloo United U20	10	4	3	3	22	22	0	15	
6	Inter Toronto U20 White	10	4	0	6	22	33	−11	12	
7	Sigma FC U20	10	3	3	4	15	19	−4	12	
8	International FC U20	10	3	2	5	17	32	−15	11	
9	Windsor City FC U20	10	3	1	6	7	22	−15	10	
10	Burlington SC U20 Southwest	10	2	2	6	18	19	−1	8	
11	Burlington SC U20 Central	10	1	0	9	14	53	−39	3	

Source: OPL
Rules for classification: 1) Total wins; 2) Goal differential; 3) Goals for; 4) Away goal differential; 5) Away goals for; 6) Home goal differential; 7) Home goals for; 8) Head-to-head points; 9) Head-to-head goal differential; 10) Drawing of lots.
(C) Champions

==== Playoffs ====
The top four teams qualified for the playoffs.

Semifinals; November 10
1	Richmond Hill SC U20	2
4	FC London U20	0
2	The Borough FC U20	1
3	Inter Toronto U20 Blue	4

Championship Game; November 14
1	Richmond Hill SC U20	2(7)
3	Inter Toronto U20 Blue	2(8)
