= 2025 League1 Ontario season =

League1 Ontario
- Season: 2025
- Champions: Woodbridge Strikers SC (L1O-P); Unionville Milliken SC (L1O-C); St. Catharines Roma Wolves B (L2O)
- L1 Cup champions: Scrosoppi FC

The 2025 Men's League1 Ontario season was the eleventh of League1 Ontario, a division 3 men's soccer league in the Canadian soccer league system and the highest level of soccer based in the Canadian province of Ontario. The league is split into three divisions with promotion and relegation between them.

The Premier division had 11 clubs, while the Championship division had 12, all returning from last season. League2 Ontario was made up by three conferences containing reserve teams and newly licensed clubs.

== League1 Ontario Premier ==
League1 Ontario Premier
- Season: 2025
- Dates: April 19 – August 26
- Champions: Woodbridge Strikers
- Relegated: FC London
- Matches: 110
- Goals: 392 (3.56 per match)
- Top goalscorer: Ronaldo Marshall (13 goals)

League1 Ontario Premier will be composed of 11 teams. FC London and St. Catharines Roma Wolves were promoted from the Championship division last season. ProStars FC dropped out of the league shortly prior to the release of the schedules and were not replaced. Blue Devils FC have re-branded as Oakville SC following a merger.

The 11 teams will face each other twice, once at home and once away for a total of 20 matches. At the end of the season, the club at the top of the standings will be crowned as League1 Ontario champions and gain a berth for the 2026 Canadian Championship. The club that finishes in 10th will advance to the promotion playoffs against the third place finisher in the Championship, while the 11th placed club will be automatically relegated to the Championship division.

=== Clubs ===
League1 Premier
Team	City	Principal stadium	Head coach
Alliance United FC	Scarborough (Toronto)	Centennial College	Nikola Stakic
Burlington SC	Burlington	Corpus Christi	Mark Worton
FC London	London	Tricar Field	Yiannis Tsalatsidis
North Toronto Nitros	North York (Toronto)	Downsview Park	Filip Prostran
Oakville SC	Oakville	Sheridan Trafalgar Campus	Duncan Wilde
Scrosoppi FC	Milton	St. Francis Xavier	John Yacou
Sigma FC	Mississauga	Paramount Fine Foods Centre / Tim Hortons Field	John Zervos
Simcoe County Rovers FC	Barrie	J.C. Massie Field	Doneil Henry
St. Catharines Roma Wolves	St. Catharines	Club Roma – Under Armour Field	Federico Turriziani
Vaughan Azzurri	Vaughan	North Maple Field	Anthony Vadori
Woodbridge Strikers	Woodbridge (Vaughan)	Vaughan Grove Field	Peter Pinizzotto

=== Standings ===
Pos	Team	Pld	W	D	L	GF	GA	GD	Pts	Qualification or relegation
1	Woodbridge Strikers (C)	20	13	4	3	46	18	+28	43	Qualification to 2026 Canadian Championship
2	Scrosoppi FC	20	12	5	3	47	23	+24	41	
3	Alliance United FC	20	10	5	5	43	33	+10	35	
4	Simcoe County Rovers FC	20	8	6	6	32	27	+5	30	
5	Oakville SC	20	8	5	7	29	31	−2	29	
6	Vaughan Azzurri	20	8	5	7	42	30	+12	29	
7	St. Catharines Roma Wolves	20	7	7	6	42	40	+2	28	
8	Burlington SC	20	8	0	12	28	37	−9	24	
9	Sigma FC	20	7	3	10	33	42	−9	24	
10	North Toronto Nitros	20	5	2	13	32	59	−27	17	Qualification to relegation playoffs
11	FC London (R)	20	2	2	16	18	52	−34	8	Relegation to League1 Ontario Championship

Source: League1 Ontario
(C) Champions; (R) Relegated

=== Promotion playoffs ===
A playoff was played between the 10th placed team in the Premier and the 3rd placed team in the Championship in a single game for a place in the top tier in 2026.

August 29, 2025	North Toronto Nitros (L1O Premier 10th place)	2–1 (a.e.t.)	The Borough FC (L1O Championship 3rd Place)	Toronto, Ontario
20:00	Fraj 78'; Rollocks 114'	Report	Kuszaj 63'	Stadium: Downsview Park; Referee: Ryan Schwenger

=== Statistics ===
==== Top goalscorers ====
(does not include promotion playoffs)

Rank	Player	Club	Goals
1	Ronaldo Marshall	Woodbridge Strikers	13
2	Anthony Morano	Woodbridge Strikers	12
3	Cyrus Rollocks	North Toronto Nitros	10
3	Ryan Robinson	Vaughan Azzurri	10
5	Reshaun Walkes	Simcoe County Rovers FC	9
5	Tomasz Skublak	Scrosoppi FC	9
7	Dante Ruddock	Sigma FC	8
7	Jared Agyemang	St. Catharines Roma Wolves	8
7	Kingsley Belele	Alliance United FC	8
7	Orlendis Benítez	Scrosoppi FC	8
7	Ronaldo Homenszki	St. Catharines Roma Wolves	8
7	Sebastian Castello	Sigma FC	8

Source: League1 Ontario

=== League Honours ===
==== Awards ====
Award	Player	Team	Ref
Most Valuable Player	Anthony Aromatario	Woodbridge Strikers	
Young Player of the Year (U20)	Jacob Cabral	Scrosoppi FC	
Coach of the Year	Peter Pinizzotto	Woodbridge Strikers	
Goalkeeper of the Year	David Carano	Woodbridge Strikers	
Defender of the Year	Carmine Fiore	Woodbridge Strikers	
Midfielder of the Year	Anthony Aromatario	Woodbridge Strikers	
Forward of the Year	Cyrus Rollocks	North Toronto Nitros	
Golden Boot (Top Scorer)	Ronaldo Marshall	Woodbridge Strikers	

==== League All-Stars ====
The following players were named League1 Ontario Premier Division All-Stars for the 2025 season:

First Team All-Stars

Player	Position
David Carano (Woodbridge Strikers)	Goalkeeper
Gianluca Condello (Woodbridge Strikers)	Defender
Carmine Fiore (Woodbridge Strikers)	Defender
Matthew Paiva (Scrosoppi)	Defender
Omari Cotterell (Scrosoppi)	Defender
Diego Rivera (St. Catharines Roma)	Midfielder
Anthony Aromatario (Woodbridge Strikers)	Midfielder
Angelo Ventrella (Alliance United)	Midfielder
Sebastian Castello (Sigma FC)	Midfielder
Tomasz Skublak (Scrosoppi)	Forward
Cyrus Rollocks (North Toronto Nitros)	Forward

Second Team All-Stars

Player	Position
Filip Zendelek (Alliance United)	Goalkeeper
Ryan Baker (FC London)	Defender
Alexi Ivanov (Alliance United)	Defender
Conrad Czarnecki (St. Catharines Roma)	Defender
Luc Ihama (Simcoe County Rovers)	Defender
Brandon Duarte (Oakville SC)	Midfielder
Jacob Begkey (Vaughan Azzurri)	Midfielder
Mohamed Al Shakman (Burlington SC)	Midfielder
Ryan Robinson (Vaughan Azzurri)	Forward
Ronaldo Marshall (Woodbridge Strikers)	Forward
Reshaun Walkes (Simcoe County Rovers)	Forward

== League1 Ontario Championship ==
League1 Ontario Championship
- Season: 2025
- Dates: April 18 – August 24
- Champions: Unionville Milliken SC
- Promoted: Unionville Milliken SC; Sudbury Cyclones
- Relegated: None
- Matches: 132
- Goals: 429 (3.25 per match)
- Top goalscorer: Nigel Buckley (21 goals)

League1 Ontario Championship is composed of 12 teams, seven of those returning from the 2024 season. Toronto FC Academy withdrew from the league, after winning the title last season. Guelph United FC and Hamilton United join after being relegated from the Premier Division. Sudbury Cyclones and The Borough FC were promoted from League2 Ontario, while York United FC Academy joined as an expansion team. Darby FC rebranded as Whitby FC for this season, while BVB IA Waterloo rebranded as Waterloo United.

The top two teams in the standings will be automatically promoted to the Premier Division for 2026, while the third place finisher will advance to the promotion playoffs against the 10th place finisher in the Premier Division. There will be no relegation this season.

=== Clubs ===
League1 Championship
Team	City	Principal stadium	Head coach
Guelph United F.C.	Guelph	Centennial Bowl	Keith Mason
Hamilton United	Hamilton	Ron Joyce Stadium	Francesco Cardillo
Master's FA	Scarborough (Toronto)	L'Amoreaux Sports Complex	Ivan Galarza
North Mississauga SC	Mississauga	Churchill Meadows (Mattamy Sports Park)	Peyvand Mossavat
Pickering FC	Pickering	Pickering Soccer Centre	Eric Polo Soldevila
Sudbury Cyclones	Sudbury	Cambrian College / James Jerome Sports Complex	Joe Politi
The Borough FC	Scarborough (Toronto)	Birchmount Stadium	Zico Mahrady
Unionville Milliken SC	Unionville (Markham)	Ontario Soccer Centre	Wais Azizi
Waterloo United	Waterloo	RIM Park	Michael Marcoccia
Whitby FC	Whitby	Telus Dome	Ramin Mohammadi
Windsor City FC	Windsor	St. Clair College	Gabriel Poulino
York United FC Academy	Toronto	York Lions Stadium	Marco Bonofiglio

=== Standings ===
Pos	Team	Pld	W	D	L	GF	GA	GD	Pts	Qualification or relegation
1	Unionville Milliken SC (C, P)	22	13	4	5	48	35	+13	43	Promotion to League1 Ontario Premier
2	Sudbury Cyclones (P)	22	12	7	3	36	23	+13	43	Promotion to League1 Ontario Premier
3	The Borough FC	22	10	10	2	42	25	+17	40	Qualification to promotion playoffs
4	Whitby FC	22	10	6	6	49	29	+20	36	
5	York United FC Academy	22	10	5	7	39	36	+3	35	
6	Master's FA	22	9	7	6	31	22	+9	34	
7	Pickering FC	22	5	11	6	33	33	0	26	
8	Windsor City FC	22	7	5	10	28	40	−12	26	
9	North Mississauga SC	22	6	7	9	35	43	−8	25	
10	Waterloo United	22	6	4	12	41	36	+5	22	
11	Guelph United FC	22	5	7	10	33	46	−13	22	
12	Hamilton United	22	0	5	17	14	61	−47	5	

Source: League1 Ontario
(C) Champions; (P) Promoted

=== Statistics ===
==== Top goalscorers ====
Rank	Player	Club	Goals
1	Nigel Buckley	Whitby FC	21
2	George Akpabio	Unionville Milliken SC	18
3	Erion Metaj	Whitby FC	13
4	Jourdan Spence	The Borough FC	9
4	Timi Aliu	Sudbury Cyclones	9
6	Christian Keshishian	The Borough FC	8
6	Jaiden Santo	Sudbury Cyclones	8
8	Anthony Umanzor	York United FC Academy	7
8	Ayomide Abobare	Pickering FC	7
8	Christian Krzyzanowski	North Mississauga SC	7
8	Gianluca Scurti	Pickering FC	7
8	Markell Saddler	Waterloo United	7
8	Songmafolo Coulibay	Windsor City FC	7
8	Wesley Cain	Waterloo United	7

Source: League1 Ontario

=== League Honours ===
==== Awards ====
Award	Player	Team	Ref
Most Valuable Player	George Akpabio	Unionville Milliken SC	
Young Player of the Year (U20)	Anthony Ostrun	Guelph United FC	
Coach of the Year	Giuseppe Politi	Sudbury Cyclones	
Goalkeeper of the Year	Connor Vande Weghe	Sudbury Cyclones	
Defender of the Year	Cedric Ngounou	The Borough FC	
Midfielder of the Year	Gray Yates	Guelph United FC	
Forward of the Year	George Akpabio	Unionville Milliken SC	
Golden Boot (Top Scorer)	Nigel Buckley	Whitby FC	

==== League All-Stars ====
The following players were named League1 Ontario Premier Division All-Stars for the 2025 season:

First Team All-Stars

Player	Position
Connor Vande Weghe (Sudbury Cyclones)	Goalkeeper
Abubakar Hussein (Unionville Milliken)	Defender
Cedric Ngounou (The Borough)	Defender
Haji Shee (Unionville Milliken)	Defender
Terrell Spencer (Master's FA)	Defender
Gray Yates (Guelph United)	Midfielder
Christian Krzyzanowski (North Mississauga)	Midfielder
Diadie Traore (The Borough)	Midfielder
Erion Metaj (Whitby)	Forward
George Akpabio (Unionville Milliken)	Forward
Nigel Buckley (Whitby)	Forward

Second Team All-Stars

Player	Position
Ile Naumosko (Master's FA)	Goalkeeper
Moustapha Kamate (Windsor City)	Defender
Markus Pusztahegyi (Waterloo United)	Defender
Joseph Ntalaja (Pickering)	Defender
Brandon Oracko (Hamilton United)	Defender
Alex Gatto (Unionville Milliken)	Midfielder
Jack Sears (Guelph United)	Midfielder
Matthew Smith (York United Academy)	Midfielder
Songmafolo Coulibay (Windsor City)	Forward
Jaiden Santo (Sudbury Cyclones)	Forward
Ryan Silverstein (The Borough)	Forward

== League2 Ontario ==
League2 Ontario
- Season: 2025
- Dates: April 22 – August 1
- Champions: St. Catharines Roma Wolves B (1st title)
- Promoted: Cambridge United
- Matches: 168
- Goals: 668 (3.98 per match)
- Top goalscorer: Christian Ferraro (14 goals)

League2 Ontario clubs will be divided in three regional conferences. Those clubs will be either the "B" team of Premier and Championship clubs or newly licensed clubs. Railway City FC and Cambridge United join as expansion teams.

The winner of each division, as well as the best second place finisher will advance to the League2 Playoffs. The winner of the playoffs will earn promotion to the Championship division. If the winner of the playoffs is a B team, they may decline promotion, and instead the top two A teams with the most regular-season points in the division will meet in a playoff to earn promotion.

=== Northeast Conference ===
Pos	Team	Pld	W	D	L	GF	GA	GD	Pts	Qualification or relegation
1	Vaughan Azzurri B	14	13	1	0	60	19	+41	40	Qualification to promotion playoffs and L2O finals
2	Alliance United FC B	14	8	2	4	30	20	+10	26	
3	Whitby FC B	14	5	7	2	25	18	+7	22	
4	Simcoe County Rovers FC B	14	6	2	6	29	20	+9	20	
5	The Borough FC B	14	4	5	5	19	24	−5	17	
6	Master's FA B	14	5	1	8	25	31	−6	16	
7	Unionville Milliken SC B	14	5	0	9	23	44	−21	15	
8	Sudbury Cyclones B	14	3	3	8	28	48	−20	12	
9	Pickering FC B	14	3	1	10	25	40	−15	10	

Source: League1 Ontario

=== Central Conference ===
Pos	Team	Pld	W	D	L	GF	GA	GD	Pts	Qualification or relegation
1	Burlington SC B	14	9	4	1	32	14	+18	31	Qualification to promotion play-offs and L2O finals
2	Rush Canada SA	14	7	4	3	41	14	+27	25	
3	Woodbridge Strikers B	14	7	3	4	29	27	+2	24	
4	North Toronto Nitros B	14	6	4	4	25	21	+4	22	
5	Oakville SC B	14	6	2	6	22	25	−3	20	
6	Scrosoppi FC B	14	4	4	6	22	23	−1	16	
7	Sigma FC B	14	4	3	7	25	30	−5	15	
8	North Mississauga SC B	14	1	0	13	11	53	−42	3	

Source: League1 Ontario

=== Southwest Conference ===
Pos	Team	Pld	W	D	L	GF	GA	GD	Pts	Qualification or relegation
1	Cambridge United (P)	14	12	0	2	48	14	+34	36	Qualification to promotion play-offs and L2O finals
2	St. Catharines Roma Wolves B (C)	14	9	3	2	30	17	+13	30	Qualification to promotion play-offs and L2O finals
3	Railway City FC	14	6	3	5	34	20	+14	21	
4	Waterloo United B	14	5	2	7	13	30	−17	17	
5	Windsor City FC B	14	5	2	7	17	23	−6	17	
6	Guelph United B	14	4	5	5	26	25	+1	17	
7	FC London B	14	3	3	8	15	24	−9	12	
8	Hamilton United B	14	2	2	10	14	44	−30	8	

Source: League1 Ontario
(C) Champions; (P) Promoted

=== League2 Ontario Finals ===
Semifinals; July 29
C1	Burlington SC B	0
SW1	Cambridge United	1
NE1	Vaughan Azzurri B	3(3)
SW2	St. Catharines Roma Wolves B	3(5)

Championship Game; August 1
SW1	Cambridge United	1
SW2	St. Catharines Roma Wolves B	2

=== Promotion playoffs ===
St. Catharines Roma Wolves B declined the promotion spot to the League1 Ontario Championship. As such, per league rules, a promotion playoff match was scheduled between the two A teams with the most points during the regular season to replace them (Cambridge United and Rush Canada SA). However, Rush Canada SA declined and forfeited the match.

August 8, 2025	Cambridge United	3–0 (ff)	Rush Canada SA	St. Thomas, Ontario
				Stadium: 1Password Park
Note: The match did not occur as Rush Canada SA forfeited the match.

=== Statistics ===
==== Top goalscorers ====
Rank	Player	Club	Goals
1	(Canada) Christian Ferraro	Cambridge United	14
2	(Canada) Adrian Panaite	Alliance United FC B	13
3	(Canada) Romero Nicolazzo	St. Catharines Roma Wolves B	12
4	(Canada) D'Andre Williams	Railway City FC	10
5	(Canada) Neshawn Sutherland	Sigma FC B	9
5	(Canada) Oliver Parratt	Whitby FC B	9
7	(Cayman Islands) Anthony Nelson	Master's FA B	8
7	(Canada) Caleb Eastman	FC London B	8
7	(Canada) Karl Espiro	Burlington SC B	8
7	(Canada) Nikolas Antolcic	Cambridge United	8

Source: League1 Ontario

=== League Honours ===
==== Awards ====
Award	Northeast Division	Central Division	Southwest Division	Ref
Most Valuable Player	Adrian Panaite (Alliance United B)	Alp Arikan (Rush Canada SA)	Christian Ferraro (Cambridge United)	
Coach of the Year	Fabio Campoli (Vaughan Azzurri B)	Ivan Juric (North Toronto Nitros B)	Andrew Currie (St. Catharines Roma B)	
Goalkeeper of the Year	Owen Schultz (Whitby FC B)	Martin Ennright (Burlington SC B)	Sam Schafer (Cambridge United)	
Defender of the Year	Loic Gunn (Simcoe County Rovers B)	Lucas Di Marco (Rush Canada)	Alan Monyard (Railway City FC)	
Midfielder of the Year	Marco Sciortino (Vaughan Azzurri B)	Filip Arbutina (North Toronto Nitros B)	Christopher Qushair (Guelph United B)	
Forward of the Year	Adrian Panaite (Alliance United B)	Neshawn Sutherland (Sigma FC B)	Christian Ferraro (Cambridge United)	
Golden Boot (Top Scorer)	Adrian Panaite (Alliance United B)	Neshawn Sutherland (Sigma FC B)	Christian Ferraro (Cambridge United)	

==== League All-Stars ====
The following players were named League2 Ontario All-Stars for the 2025 season:

Northeast Division

Player	Position
Owen Schultz (Whitby FC B)	Goalkeeper
Cameron Sailsman (Pickering FC B)	Defender
Loic Gunn (Simcoe County Rovers B)	Defender
Michael Campoli (Vaughan Azzurri B)	Defender
Christian Kyriacou (Vaughan Azzurri B)	Defender
Francesco Panetta (Vaughan Azzurri B)	Midfielder
Feargod Ozomba (Simcoe County B)	Midfielder
Marco Sciortino (Vaughan Azzurri B)	Midfielder
Oliver Parratt (Whitby FC B)	Midfielder
Adrian Panaite (Alliance United B)	Forward
Luca Priolo (Vaughan Azzurri B)	Forward

Central Division

Player	Position
Martin Ennright (Burlington SC B)	Goalkeeper
Matea Kovacevic (ProStars FC B)	Defender
Luca DiMarco (Rush Canada SA)	Defender
Justin Lima (Oakville SC B)	Defender
Christopher Vitantonio (Woodbridge B)	Defender
Oliver Barta (Rush Canada SA)	Midfielder
Alp Arikan (Rush Canada SA)	Midfielder
Filip Arbutina (North Toronto Nitros B)	Midfielder
Karl Espiro (Burlington SC B)	Forward
Ethan Agyare Danso (Woodbridge B)	Forward
Neshawn Sutherland (Sigma B)	Forward

Southwest Division

Player	Position
Sam Schafer (Cambridge United)	Goalkeeper
Matteo Grant (Cambridge United)	Defender
Alan Monyard (Railway City FC)	Defender
Stone Campbell (Windsor City FC)	Defender
Dante De Benedetti (St. Catharines B)	Defender
D'Andre Williams (Railway City FC)	Midfielder
Brandon Bernardi (St. Catharines Roma B)	Midfielder
Christopher Qushair (Guelph United B)	Midfielder
Romero Nicolazzo (St. Catharines Roma B)	Midfielder
Christian Ferraro (Cambridge United)	Forward
Amro Hlail (Windsor City FC B)	Forward

== L1 Cup ==
The L1 Cup is a league cup tournament that was contested by A teams from all three tiers of League1 Ontario.

All 26 "A" teams participate in the five-round knockout competition, which is played concurrently with the league season. Eighteen clubs entered the first round (five clubs from the Premier Division, all twelve clubs from the Championship division, and the three A teams from League2), while six clubs from the Premier Division received a bye to the round of 16.

=== Bracket ===
- First Round
- April 11–13

- Round of 16
- May 14 – June 9

- Quarterfinals
- June 19 – July 16 (Note: Scrosoppi and North Toronto originally had their match scheduled on July 2. At the 15th minute, the match was abandoned due to lightning and eventually re-scheduled for July 16)

- Semifinals
- August 6

- Final
- August 20

L1OP
Simcoe County Rovers FC
2

L2O
Cambridge United
0

L1OP
Alliance United FC
0

L2O
Cambridge United
3

L1OP
Simcoe County Rovers FC
4

L1OC
Unionville Milliken SC
0

L1OC
Whitby FC
2

L1OC
Waterloo United
1

L1OC
Whitby FC
1(4)

L1OC
Unionville Milliken SC
1(5)

L1OC
Unionville Milliken SC
2

L2O
Rush Canada SA
0

L1OP
Simcoe County Rovers FC
1(3)

L1OP
Scrosoppi FC
1(5)

L1OP
North Toronto Nitros
4

L1OP
St. Catharines Roma Wolves
2

L1OP
St. Catharines Roma Wolves
4

L1OC
The Borough FC
1

L1OP
North Toronto Nitros
3(5)

L1OP
Scrosoppi FC
3(6)

L1OP
Scrosoppi FC
3

L1OC
Windsor City FC
0

L1OC
Windsor City FC
0(4)

L1OC
Guelph United FC
0(2)

L1OP
Scrosoppi FC
3

L1OP
Vaughan Azzurri
1

L1OP
Woodbridge Strikers
4

L1OC
York United FC Academy
1

L1OC
York United FC Academy
0(4)

L1OC
Sudbury Cyclones
0(3)

L1OP
Woodbridge Strikers
3

L1OP
FC London
1

L1OC
Master's FA
1(2)

L1OC
North Mississauga SC
1(3) (Note: North Mississauga and Master's FA originally had their match scheduled for April 13. The match was abandoned after the 68th minute due to darkness with the score at 1–1. Instead, their league matchup on May 2 was counted as both a league match and a cup match. The match ended in a 1–1 draw for league purposes, with a penalty shootout followed to determine the cup winner)

L1OC
North Mississauga SC
0(3)

L1OP
FC London
0(5)

L1OP
FC London
2

L1OC
Hamilton United
0

L1OP
Woodbridge Strikers
0

L1OP
Vaughan Azzurri
2

L1OP
Vaughan Azzurri
2

L1OP
Oakville SC
1

L1OP
Oakville SC
4

L2O
Railway City FC
0

L1OP
Vaughan Azzurri
2

L1OP
Burlington SC
1

L1OP
Burlington SC
5

L1OC
Pickering FC
2

L1OP
Sigma FC
2

L1OC
Pickering FC
3

== U20 Reserve Division ==
The league operated a reserve division which was split into regional conferences. It is not part of the regular pyramid and teams are not eligible for promotion.

=== Summer Division ===
==== Northeast Conference ====
Pos	Team	Pld	W	D	L	GF	GA	GD	Pts	Qualification or relegation
1	FC Durham U20	14	11	0	3	38	28	+10	33	Qualification to playoffs
2	Woodbridge Strikers U20 East	14	10	2	2	58	19	+39	32	
3	Aurora FC U20	14	9	1	4	31	20	+11	28	
4	The Borough FC U20	14	6	4	4	38	35	+3	22	
5	Unionville Milliken SC U20	14	6	2	6	39	33	+6	20	
6	Pickering FC U20	14	6	2	6	34	34	0	20	
7	Whitby FC U20	14	6	0	8	22	36	−14	18	
8	Alliance United FC U20	14	4	1	9	23	27	−4	13	
9	Simcoe County Rovers FC U20	14	3	2	9	25	56	−31	11	
10	Master's FA U20	14	1	2	11	22	42	−20	5	

Source: League1 Ontario

==== Central Conference ====
Pos	Team	Pld	W	D	L	GF	GA	GD	Pts	Qualification or relegation
1	Vaughan Azzurri U20	14	12	1	1	56	18	+38	37	Qualification to playoffs
2	Woodbridge Strikers U20 West (C)	14	11	2	1	67	18	+49	35	Qualification to playoffs
3	Oakville SC U20	14	10	0	4	39	23	+16	30	
4	North Toronto Nitros U20	14	8	2	4	35	27	+8	26	
5	North Mississauga SC U20	14	7	3	4	29	33	−4	24	
6	Sigma FC U20	14	4	3	7	24	33	−9	15	
7	Rush Canada SA U20	14	4	1	9	23	41	−18	13	
8	Burlington SC U20 East	14	2	2	10	23	46	−23	8	
9	Richmond Hill SC U20	14	1	3	10	9	37	−28	6	
10	Scrosoppi FC U20	14	1	3	10	15	44	−29	6	

Source: League1 Ontario
(C) Champions

==== Southwest Conference ====
Pos	Team	Pld	W	D	L	GF	GA	GD	Pts	Qualification or relegation
1	FC London U20	14	11	1	2	37	19	+18	34	Qualification to playoffs
2	Railway City FC U20	14	10	3	1	51	16	+35	33	
3	Burlington SC U20 West	14	8	2	4	35	25	+10	26	
4	Hamilton United U20	14	5	3	6	27	33	−6	18	
5	Cambridge United U20	14	5	2	7	28	30	−2	17	
6	Windsor City FC U20	14	5	1	8	34	42	−8	16	
7	Guelph United U20	14	3	1	10	18	37	−19	10	
8	Waterloo United U20	14	1	3	10	18	46	−28	6	

Source: League1 Ontario

==== Playoffs ====
The top team in each division plus the best runner-up qualified for the playoffs.

Semifinals; July 28–30
SW1	FC London U20	3
NE1	FC Durham U20	2
C1	Vaughan Azzurri U20	3
WC	Woodbridge Strikers U20 West	4

Championship Game; August 2
SW1	FC London U20	0
WC	Woodbridge Strikers U20 West	9

=== Fall Division ===
Pos	Team	Pld	W	D	L	GF	GA	GD	Pts	Qualification or relegation
1	The Borough FC U20	10	7	1	2	36	16	+20	22	Qualification to playoffs
2	St. Catharines Roma Wolves U20	10	6	1	3	34	18	+16	19	Qualification to playoffs
3	Sigma FC U20 (C)	10	6	1	3	23	18	+5	19	Qualification to playoffs
4	Unionville Milliken SC U20	10	5	2	3	27	20	+7	17	Qualification to playoffs
5	Richmond Hill SC U20	10	5	1	4	22	20	+2	16	
6	Guelph United FC U20	10	4	3	3	25	23	+2	15	
7	Hamilton United U20	10	4	1	5	21	21	0	13	
8	Burlington SC U20 West	10	4	1	5	23	27	−4	13	
9	Burlington SC U20 East	10	2	2	6	20	28	−8	8	
10	Simcoe County Rovers FC U20	10	0	1	9	8	48	−40	1	

Source: League1 Ontario
(C) Champions

==== Playoffs ====
Semifinals; November 5
1	The Borough FC U20	1(7)
4	Unionville Milliken SC U20	1(6)
2	St. Catharines Roma Wolves U20	2
3	Sigma FC U20	4

Championship Game; November 18
1	The Borough FC U20	1(2)
3	Sigma FC U20	1(4)
