= Luke Green (soccer) =

Canadian soccer player (born 2002)

Personal information
- Date of birth: December 12, 2002 (age 23)
- Place of birth: Halifax, Nova Scotia, Canada
- Height: 1.88 m (6 ft 2 in)
- Positions: Centre-back; midfielder

Youth career
- Suburban FC

College career
Years	Team	Apps	(Gls)
2021–2035	St. Francis Xavier X-Men	59	(4)

Senior career*
Years	Team	Apps	(Gls)
2020	HFX Wanderers	1	(0)
2021	Calgary Foothills	0	(0)
2022	Electric City FC	10	(0)
2024	Guelph United	16	(0)
2025	Simcoe County Rovers FC	19	(2)
2026–	Kingston Sentinels	14	(2)
- * Club domestic league appearances and goals as of November 17, 2026

Luke Green (born December 12, 2002) is a Canadian professional soccer player, who currently plays for the Kingston Sentinels in the Ontario Premier League 3.

== Early life ==
Green grew up in Halifax, Nova Scotia and played youth soccer for local club Suburban FC.

== University career ==
In 2021, he began playing attending St. Francis Xavier University, playing university soccer for the men's team. In 2023, he was named an AUS Second Team All-Star. In 2024, he was named an AUS First Team All-Star. In 2025, he was named an AUS First Team All-Star and a Second Team U Sports All-Canadian.

== Club career ==
In February 2019, Green was invited to the training camp for Canadian Premier League side HFX Wanderers. On 31 July 2020, Green signed a developmental contract with the Wanderers. He made his debut on September 15 against Pacific FC. He was later invited again to participate in their 2022 training camp.

In June 2021, Green was unveiled as part of the Calgary Foothills for their upcoming season.

On March 23, 2022, Green signed with Electric City FC of League1 Ontario. Later in 2022, and again in July 2023, he was named to the roster for the HFX Wanderers U23 team that would be composed of a group of local players to play a pair of friendlies against Première ligue de soccer du Québec clubs.

In 2024, he signed with Guelph United FC in League1 Ontario.

In 2025, he joined Simcoe County Rovers FC in League1 Ontario.

== Honours ==
HFX Wanderers

- Canadian Premier League
  - Runners-up: 2020
