= Ty Clarke (footballer) =

Vincentian footballer (born 2008)

Personal information
- Full name: Kevonté Tyrique Jaaziah Clarke
- Date of birth: January 1, 2008 (age 18)
- Place of birth: Toronto, Ontario, Canada
- Position: Midfielder

Team information
- Current team: Inter Toronto FC

Youth career
- System 3
- Sigma FC
- 2024–2025: Toronto FC
- 2026–: Inter Toronto FC

Senior career*
| Years | Team | Apps | (Gls) |
| 2024 | Toronto FC III | 4 | (1) |
| 2026– | Inter Toronto III | 3 | (3) |
| 2026– | Inter Toronto II | 13 | (8) |
| 2026– | Inter Toronto | 9 | (1) |

International career^{‡}
- Saint Vincent and the Grenadines U17
- Saint Vincent and the Grenadines U20
| 2026– | Saint Vincent and the Grenadines | 2 | (0) |
- * Club domestic league appearances and goals as of October 31, 2026 ‡ National team caps and goals as of October 14, 2026

Kevonté Tyrique Jaaziah Clarke (born January 1, 2008) is a footballer who plays as a forward for Inter Toronto FC in the Canadian Premier League. Born in Canada, he represents Saint Vincent and the Grenadines at international level.

== Early life ==
Born in Toronto, Clarke spent some of his youth in St. Vincent and the Grenadines, where he played with System 3 Academy. After returning to Canada, Clarke played youth soccer with Sigma FC and the Toronto FC Academy, also being invited to train with professional side Toronto FC II. In 2026, he joined the Inter Toronto academy system.

== Club career ==
In 2024, Clarke played with Toronto FC III in the League1 Ontario Championship.

In May 2026, Clarke signed with Inter Toronto II in the Ontario Premier League 2. In July 2026, he signed a developmental contract with the Inter Toronto FC first team in the Canadian Premier League. He made his professional debut for the first team on July 4 against Vancouver FC. In August 2026, he signed a fully professional contract with Inter Toronto through the 2028 season, with options for 2029 and 2030. On September 5, 2026, he started his first CPL match and also scored his first professional goal in a match against Forge FC.

== International career ==
Clarke played with the Saint Vincent and the Grenadines U17 and U20 teams, serving as captain with the U20s. In March 2026, he debuted with Saint Vincent and the Grenadines senior team.

== Career statistics ==
As of October 14, 2026

| Club | Season | League | | | Playoffs | | Domestic Cup | | Continental | | Total | |
| Club | Season | Division | Apps | Goals | Apps | Goals | Apps | Goals | Apps | Goals | Apps | Goals |
|---|---|---|---|---|---|---|---|---|---|---|---|---|
| Toronto FC III | 2024 | League1 Ontario Championship | 4 | 1 | – | | – | | – | | 4 | 1 |
| Inter Toronto FC III | 2026 | Ontario Premier League 3 | 3 | 3 | – | | – | | – | | 3 | 3 |
| Inter Toronto FC II | 2026 | Ontario Premier League 2 | 13 | 8 | – | | – | | – | | 13 | 8 |
| Inter Toronto FC | 2026 | Canadian Premier League | 7 | 1 | – | | 0 | 0 | – | | 7 | 1 |
| Career total | | | 27 | 13 | 0 | 0 | 0 | 0 | 0 | 0 | 27 | 13 |
