= Alain Sargeant =

Saint Kitts and Nevis footballer

Personal information
- Full name: Alain Osondu Sargeant
- Date of birth: 27 November 1995 (age 30)
- Place of birth: Toronto, Ontario, Canada
- Height: 1.85 m (6 ft 1 in)
- Position: Defender

Youth career
- 2007–2010: North Toronto Nitros
- 2010–2011: Ajax SC
- 2011–2015: Toronto FC

College career
Years	Team	Apps	(Gls)
2014–2017	George Mason Patriots	68	(1)

Senior career*
Years	Team	Apps	(Gls)
2014	K-W United	8	(0)
2015	Toronto FC Academy	11	(0)
2016	AC Connecticut	14	(0)
2018	Vaughan Azzurri	3	(0)
2018–2019	Caribbean Stars AC (indoor)		
2019	Thunder Bay Chill	11	(1)
2021	Vaughan Azzurri	8	(0)
2022–2023	Simcoe County Rovers	0	(0)
2024	Unionville Milliken SC	14	(0)
2025–	Vaughan Azzurri	30	(1)

International career^{‡}
2012	Saint Kitts and Nevis U20		
2016–	Saint Kitts and Nevis	11	(0)
- * Club domestic league appearances and goals as of 23 August 2024 ‡ National team caps and goals as of 31 December 2019

Alain Osondu Sargeant (born 27 November 1995) is a footballer who plays as a defender who plays for Unionville Milliken SC in League1 Ontario. Born in Canada, he represents the Saint Kitts and Nevis national team.

== Early life ==
Sargeant began his career with North Toronto Nitros, playing for the club from 2007 until 2010. He was selected for the Toronto Soccer Association District team in 2007, as well as the Region 3 Regional Team in 2007 and 2008. He then represented Ajax Gunners 95 in 2010 and 2011. Sargeant attended Bill Crothers Secondary School, where he played for the high school team for two years. During that time he featured for the Toronto FC Academy, having joined in 2011.

Sargeant was nominated for Canadian Soccer League Defender of the Year that same season, as well as finishing as an Under-17 Adidas Generation Cup finalist. After a successful season, Sargeant clinched the Canadian Soccer League Second Division title with the Toronto FC Academy.

== College career ==
Sargeant attended George Mason University, and played in all 20 matches over the 2014 season for the George Mason Patriots. The following year, he made a further 17 appearances for the Patriots.

== Club career ==
During 2014, Sargeant also played for K-W United, finishing second in the USL Premier Development League.

In 2015, he returned to the PDL, this time with Toronto FC Academy making 11 appearances.

In 2016, he moved to AC Connecticut.

In 2018, Sargeant played with Vaughan Azzurri in League1 Ontario. In the winter of 2018-19, he played indoor soccer in the Mississauga-based Arena Premier League with the Caribbean Stars AC.

In 2019, he played with the Thunder Bay Chill in USL League Two.

In 2021, he returned to Vaughan Azzurri.

In 2022, he joined Simcoe County Rovers, but did not appear in any matches.

In 2024, he returned to Vaughan Azzurri, this time for their OSL team.

== International career ==
Sargeant made his international debut for St. Kitts & Nevis on February 21, 2016, featuring in a 3–0 victory over Bermuda. He was later called up to be included in the international squad for 2017 Caribbean Cup qualification.

== Personal life ==
Sargeant is the son of Osmond Sargeant and Yvonne Osondu, and grew up in Scarborough, Toronto, Ontario. His father was a triple jumper, and was born in St. Kitts, therefore allowing Sargeant to represent the St. Kitts and Nevis national team.
