= Ty Clarke =

Ty Clarke may refer to:

- Ty Clarke (footballer) (born 2008), Vincentian footballer
- Ty Clarke (American football) (born 1953), American former football coach
