= George Akpabio =

Nigerian footballer (born 1992)

Personal information
- Full name: George Akpabio
- Date of birth: 16 November 1992 (age 33)
- Place of birth: Jos, Nigeria
- Height: 1.85 m (6 ft 1 in)
- Position: Striker

Youth career
- Plateau United

Senior career*
| Years | Team | Apps | (Gls) |
| 2011–2012 | Plateau United | 30 | (18) |
| 2012–2015 | Ajax Cape Town | 13 | (5) |
| 2012–2013 | → Vasco da Gama (loan) | 17 | (14) |
| 2013–2014 | → Chippa United (loan) | 21 | (13) |
| 2014–2015 | Chippa United | 23 | (13) |
| 2015–2016 | Yeni Malatyaspor | 20 | (6) |
| 2016–2018 | Hapoel Katamon Jerusalem | 48 | (13) |
| 2018–2019 | Bnei Sakhnin | 10 | (1) |
| 2020–2021 | Al-Nojoom | | |
| 2024–2025 | Unionville Milliken SC | 40 | (29) |
| 2026– | International FC | 1 | (2) |
- * Club domestic league appearances and goals as of 18 April 2026

George Akpabio (born 16 November 1992) is a Nigerian professional footballer who plays as a striker for International FC in the Ontario Premier League.

== Club career ==
=== Plateau United ===
Akpabio made his professional debut for Plateau United during the 2011–2012 season, in which he became the club's all-time leading goal scorer, with 18 goals. He had attracted interest from the Norwegian club Viking FK, however he failed to transfer, since Plateau United were battling relegation, and they refused to let him go. In January 2012 Akpabio transferred to the South African club.

=== Ajax Cape Town ===
Acquired from Plateau United during the Winter transfer window of the 2011–12 season, Akpabio made his debut for Ajax Cape Town on 2 February 2012 against ZESCO, in an International friendly match with the club from Zambia, winning (3–1). He was acquired by Ajax Cape Town in January 2012 as a transfer from Nigerian club Plateau United making 10 league appearances during the second half of the season scoring once.

==== Vasco da Gama (loan) ====
For the 2012/13 season, Akpabio was loaned to Vasco da Gama, another club from Cape Town playing in the National First Division, making 17 league appearances, scoring 14 times, returning to Ajax Cape Town after serving his loan spell.

==== Chippa United (loan) ====
For the 2013/14 season, Akpabio was loaned to Chippa United, another club from Cape Town playing in the National First Division once again, helping his side to a successful promotion to the top flight during his loan spell.

=== Chippa United ===
On 5 June 2014 it was revealed that Chippa United had exercised their right to sign the striker, with Akpabio signing a 2,5 year contract with the club.

=== Yeni Malatyaspor ===
On 16 July 2015 it was announced that Akpabio had joined Yeni Malatyaspor, playing in the TFF First League, the 2nd tier of professional football in Turkey.

=== Hapoel Katamon Jerusalem ===
On 22 January 2017 it was announced that Akpabio signed with Hapoel Katamon Jerusalem to play as striker in Liga Leumit, 2nd professional football league in Israel.

== Career statistics ==
=== Club ===
As of 17 June 2017

| Club performance | | | League | | Cup | | Continental | | Other | | Total | |
| Season | Club | League | Apps | Goals | Apps | Goals | Apps | Goals | Apps | Goals | Apps | Goals |
| Nigeria | | | League | | Challenge Cup | | Africa^{1} | | Other^{2} | | Total | |
|---|---|---|---|---|---|---|---|---|---|---|---|---|
| 2010–11 | Plateau United | Nigeria Premier League | 30 | 18 | - | - | - | - | - | - | 30 | 18 |
| South Africa | | | League | | Nedbank Cup | | Africa^{1} | | Other^{2} | | Total | |
| 2011–12 | Ajax Cape Town | Premier Soccer League | 10 | 1 | - | - | - | - | - | - | 10 | 1 |
| 2012–13 | Vasco da Gama (loan) | National First Division | 17 | 14 | - | - | - | - | - | - | 17 | 14 |
| 2013–14 | Chippa United (loan) | National First Division | 21 | 13 | - | - | - | - | - | - | 21 | 13 |
| 2014–15 | Chippa United | Premier Soccer League | 4 | 0 | - | - | - | - | - | - | 4 | 0 |
| Israel | | | League | | State Cup | | Europe | | Other^{2} | | Total | |
| 2017- | Hapoel Katamon Jerusalem | Liga Leumit | 17 | 4 | - | - | - | - | - | - | 17 | 4 |
| Total | Nigeria | | 30 | 18 | - | - | - | - | - | - | 30 | 18 |
| Total | South Africa | | 52 | 28 | - | - | - | - | - | - | 52 | 28 |
| Total | Israel | | 17 | 4 | - | - | - | - | - | - | 17 | 4 |
| Total | Career total | | 99 | 50 | - | - | - | - | - | - | 99 | 50 |

Statistics accurate as of last match played on 22 October 2014.

^{1} Includes CAF Champions League, CAF Confederation Cup and CAF Super Cup matches.

^{2} Includes Telkom Knockout and MTN 8 matches.
