= Inter Toronto Pathway =

Soccer club in Toronto, Ontario

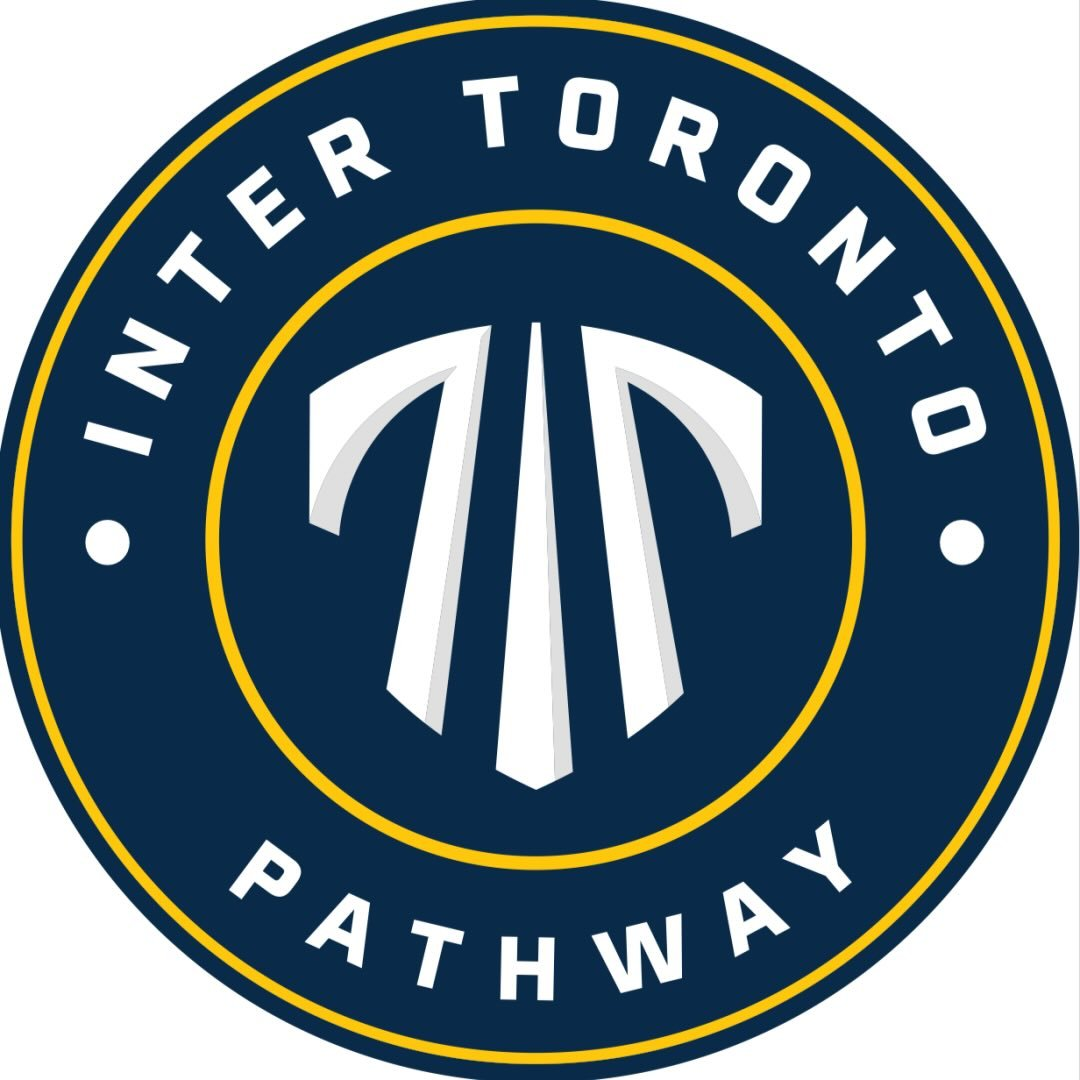
- Full name: Inter Toronto Pathway
- Nickname: The Nine Stripes
- Founded: 2024
- Stadium: York Lions Stadium
- Capacity: 4,000
- Owner: Inter Toronto FC
- Head coach: Silviu Butnaru
- League: Ontario Premier League 2, 3, and U20
- 2025: L1O-C, 5th
- Website: https://www.canpl.ca/intertoronto/

Inter Toronto Pathway (formerly known as York United FC Academy) is the youth academy and development system of Canadian Premier League club Inter Toronto FC. It consists of three squads, Inter Toronto II, Inter Toronto III, and Inter Toronto IV, which compete in the second, third, and U20 reserve levels, respectively, of the Ontario Premier League.

== History ==
=== Prior to founding ===
In September 2022, the club had announced a partnership with the United Football Academy (the relationship no longer exists as of 2023). In 2023, the club announced a partnership with League1 Ontario club Alliance United FC, allowing York to send down players to Alliance to play in some matches with the club.

=== Launch ===
In November 2024, it was announced that York United FC acquired a license to enter a club in the League1 Ontario Championship, the second tier of League1 Ontario, a Division 3 league in the Canadian soccer league system. The team's roster will consist of amateur U20 players, along with a maximum of three domestic U23 players, and per league rules the team will be allowed to have up to three first team players loaned to the team's roster for matches. The team will played some of its home matches at York Lions Stadium, the same venue as the first team, with the matches occurring on the same day, resulting in double-headers of matches. They finished their first season in fifth place.

In July 2025, they announced that for the 2026 teams, they would field a second team in League2 Ontario, the third tier of League1 Ontario, which would be a U19 squad, with the first squad becoming a U21 team (increased from U20).

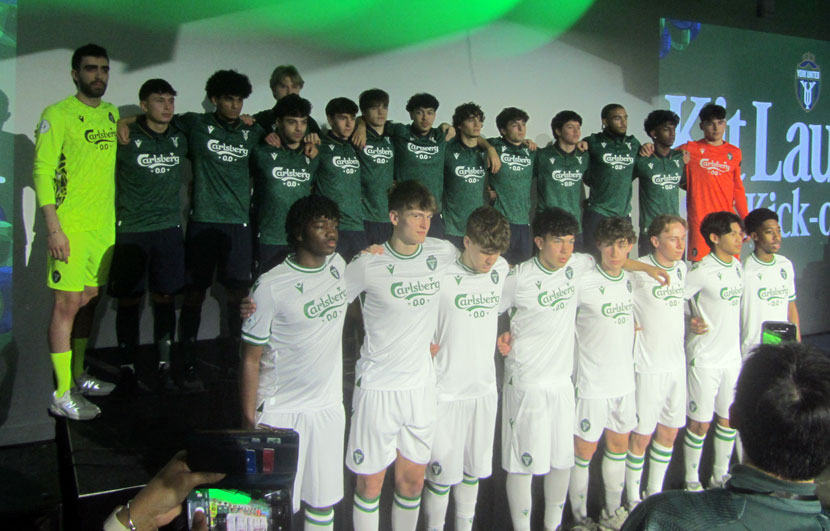
Inaugural roster of York United FC Academy in 2025

=== Inter Toronto Era ===
In November 2025, as part of the rebrand to Inter Toronto FC, the club changed their name to Inter Toronto Pathway. The club ownership devoted this rebrand to boosting its academy presence. After fielding the U21 team in the 2025 season (as York United FC Academy) for the first time, it plans to add U13, U14, U15, U18 teams in the 2026 season.

== Seasons ==
=== Inter Toronto II ===
Season	League	Teams	Record	Rank	Playoffs	League Cup	Ref
2025	League1 Ontario Championship	12	10–5–7	5th	–	Round of 16	
2026	Ontario Premier League 2	12	7–7–8	8th	–	First Round	

=== Inter Toronto III ===
Season	League	Teams	Record	Rank	Playoffs	Ref
2026	Ontario Premier League 3	28	6–2–6	6th (Central)	–	

=== Inter Toronto IV ===
Season	League	Teams	Record	Rank	Playoffs	Ref
2026	Ontario Premier League U20 Reserve	30	3–5–6	7th (Northeast)	–	
