= Railway City FC =

Soccer club in St. Thomas, Ontario

- Founded: 2024
- Stadium: 1Password Park; St. Thomas, Ontario
- Owner: Whitecaps London SC
- Head coach: Rob Perreira (men); Anthony Vassallo (women)
- League: Ontario Premier League 3 (men & women)
- 2026: OPL3 Southwest, 1st (men); OPL3 Southwest, 2nd (women)
- Website: https://railwaycityfc.com

Railway City FC is a Canadian semi-professional soccer club based in St. Thomas, Ontario that competes in the men's and women's division of League2 Ontario.

== History ==

Whitecaps London was formed in 2016 as a youth soccer club, affiliated with the Vancouver Whitecaps Academy. In 2021, Whitecaps London began to operate teams in the League1 Ontario reserve divisions.

In October 2024, it was announced that Whitecaps London would add teams in the men's and women's divisions of League2 Ontario under the name Railway City FC. The team would play in nearby St. Thomas, Ontario, with the name paying homage to the town's history in the railway industry. In addition to the men's and women's teams, the club would also field U20 men's and women's teams in the League1 Ontario reserve division. The men's team's home opener occurred on May 10 against Windsor City FC B, while the women's home opener occurred on the following day against Oakville SC B.

== Season ==
=== Men ===
Season	League	Teams	Record	Rank	Playoffs	League Cup	Ref
2025	League2 Ontario; Southwest Conference	8	6–3–5	3rd	–	Round of 32	
2026	Ontario Premier League 3 Southwest Division	10	10-2-2	1st	Finals	Round of 16	

=== Women ===
Season	League	Teams	Record	Rank	Playoffs	League Cup	Ref
2025	League2 Ontario; Southwest Conference	10	11–2–1	2nd	–	Round of 32	
2026	Ontario Premier League 3 Southwest Division	8	9-2-3	2nd	–	Round of 16	
