= Kingston Sentinels =

Soccer club in Kingston, Ontario

- Founded: 2025
- Stadium: CaraCo Home Field
- Owner: Victory Group Ventures
- Head coach: Christian Hoefler (men); Chad Beaulieu (women)
- League: OPL3
- Website: https://sentinels.club

Kingston Sentinels is a Canadian semi-professional soccer club based in Kingston, Ontario that fields teams in both the men's and women's divisions of Ontario Premier League 3.

== History ==
In 2025, it was revealed that Victory Group Ventures began the process to secure a League1 Ontario expansion franchise for the city of Kingston, Ontario, for the 2026 season, with the goal of building a soccer-specific stadium for late 2026 or early 2027. For the 2026 season, they signed a one-year lease to playat CaraCo Field at the INVISTA Centre in Kingston. In September 2025, they were announced as an expansion franchise, entering League2 Ontario for the 2026 season. The club is supported by two local youth clubs, Atlético Kingston (who played in League1 Ontario from 2014 through 2016 as the Kingston Clippers) and Kingston United SC. The city had been without semi-professional soccer for a decade, after the Kingston Clippers departed League1 Ontario after 2016 and Kingston FC departed the Canadian Soccer League after 2014. They also announced the possibility of joining the professional Canadian Premier League as early as 2027.

==== Early 2026 Season ====
In their inaugural matches in the league cup, the women defeated Unionville Milliken SC, while the men lost to Unionville. In their inaugural regular season matches, which served as the home openers, the women defeated Whitby FC B, while the men defeated International FC B, with 650 fans in attendance.

== Men's Team ==
==== 2026 OPL 3 Season ====
The men's team ended their regular season with 13 goals conceded. Jacob Ball won the OPL3 golden boot award with 18 goals scored .On August 9th, 2026 in their promotion match, the Sentinels men's team earned promotion to the Ontario Premier League 2 (OPL 2), after defeating Railway FC 3–1 in extra time on their home pitch at CaraCo Home Field. In regulation time the score was 1-1 with Kingston's goal being scored homegrown talent Jacob Ball, and after extra time Jacob Ball scored 2 more goals to secure a hattrick for himself and promotion to OPL2 in their inaugural season. Jacob Ball won OPL 3 Northeast division MVP and the Men's Northeast division Forward of the year in the Northeastern division of OPL3 that season scoring 18 goals. Kevin Snee won the Men's Northeast division's goalkeeper of the year. Luke Green won the Men's Northeast Divison's defender of the year. Christian Hoefler won Men's Northeast Division Coach of the year.

== Women's Team ==
==== 2026 OPL 3 Season ====
The women's team finished the season 4th in OPL3 on a 7-4-3 record and with 29 goals scored and 15 goals conceded. Brianna West won OPL3 Women's Northeast Division Goalkeeper of the Year.
