= Simcoe County Rovers FC =

Canadian soccer team in Barrie, Ontario

Simcoe County Rovers
- Full name: Simcoe County Rovers Football Club
- Nickname: Rovers
- Founded: 2021
- Stadium: J.C. Massie Field at Georgian College
- Capacity: 675 seated. 1,200 including standing room
- Owner: Barrie Soccer Club
- President: Will Devellis
- Head coach: Randy Ribeiro (men); Zack Wilson (women)
- League: Ontario Premier League
- 2025: L1O-P, 4th (men); L1O-P, 1st (women)
- Website: https://www.roversfc.ca/
Home colours

Simcoe County Rovers Football Club is a Canadian semi-professional soccer club based in Barrie, Ontario, that plays in the Ontario Premier League men's and women's divisions.

The club debuted in League1 Ontario in 2022 in both the men's and women's divisions. The men's team won the league title in 2023 and participated in the 2024 Canadian Championship. The women's team won their League1 Ontario Premier league title, as well as the League1 Canada National title at the Women's Inter-Provincial Championship in 2025 and qualified for 2026 Canadian Women’s Championship. In 2026, Rovers won their second consecutive women’s Ontario Premier League championship and qualifying for the 2027 Canadian Women’s Championship.

== History ==
The club was founded in 2021, by former Canadian national team player Julian de Guzman and Peter Raco under the name FC Barrie, who had initially been part of the group forming 1812 FC Barrie, before departing to form their own team.

On July 6, 2021, the club was officially unveiled under the name Simcoe County Rovers FC as a joint partnership between Raco and de Guzman. In August 2021, it was announced that Canadian national team player Cyle Larin was joining the club as a co-owner; in December 2021, fellow Canadian national team player Doneil Henry was announced as another co-owner. In January 2022, Canadian women's team player Janine Beckie also joined the ownership group. In April 2022, Atiba Hutchinson also joined the ownership group. Since its formation, the team has been affiliated with youth clubs Barrie SC and Aurora FC (who previously operated a team in League1 Ontario until 2020), and Orangeville-based school Athlete Institute.

On October 21, 2021, it was announced that the club was officially joining both the male and female divisions of League1 Ontario for 2022, acquiring the license of Aurora FC, who did not play in 2021 and joined the Rovers as an affiliate club. Both teams played their debut matches on April 24 against Blue Devils FC, with the women winning 3–0 and the men drawing 1–1.

In 2022, the men's reserve team won the League1 Ontario U21 Reserve Division.

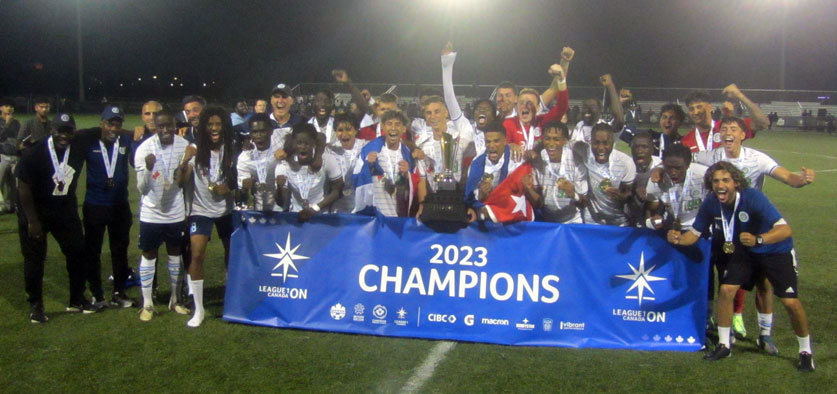
Rovers celebrate 2023 League1 Ontario title

In 2023, the men finished the regular season in second place, earning their first home playoff game, where they defeated Vaughan Azzurri in the semi-finals, in front of over 1,200 fans. In the championship final, they defeated Scrosoppi FC to win the League1 Ontario title, thereby qualifying for the 2024 Canadian Championship. Over 600 travelling supporters attended the League1 Ontario final, marking a League1 Canada traveling supporters record.

On April 24, 2024, the club made their Canadian Championship debut, where they were defeated 5-0 by Major League Soccer club Toronto FC, with over 2000 estimated Rovers fans having purchased tickets and attending the match.

In 2025, the women's team won the Premier Division title, qualifying for the League1 Canada Women's Inter-Provincial Championship, where they won the title to become the national champions and the only team from Ontario to have ever won League1 Canada’s national championship.

In December 2025, Barrie Soccer Club purchased 100% ownership of the club.

On July 16, 2026, it was announced that the Rovers women's team would be one of two semi-professional teams competing in the first W Canadian Championship in 2026, alongside CS Mont-Royal Outremont and the six teams of the fully professional NSL.

In 2026, Rovers won their second consecutive women’s Ontario Premier League championship and qualifying for the 2027 Canadian Women’s Championship.

== Players, staff, and ownership ==
=== Coaching staff ===
Men's team
Name	Position
Randy Ribeiro	Head coach and sporting director
Vacant	Assistant coach
Zack Wilson	Assistant coach
Jerry Pennant	Goalkeeper coach
Vacant	Team manager

Women's team
Name	Position
Mike Russell	Sporting director
Zack Wilson	Head coach
Randy Ribeiro	Assistant coach
Grace Tawil	Assistant coach
Jerry Pennant	Goalkeeper coach

=== Owners ===
Rovers Sports and Entertainment Group (RSEG) served as the original owners. RSEG was made up of current and former Canadian National team players, as well as others. The ownership group includes Julian de Guzman, Peter Raco, Kosi Stobbs, Will Devellis, Jason Melbourne, David Zbar, Steve Mantzouranis, as well as Canadian national team players Atiba Hutchinson, Janine Beckie, Cyle Larin, and Doneil Henry.

In December 2025, the Barrie Soccer Club acquired 100% of the club from RSEG.

=== Executives ===
Name	Position	Tenure
Will Devellis	President	2026
Andy Wilson	Director of Game Day Operations	2021–present

=== Past executives ===
Name	Position	Tenure
Julian de Guzman	President & Sporting Director	2021–2023
Peter Raco	President	2024, 2025
Peter Raco	Chief Executive Officer	2021–2025
David Zbar	Chief Marketing Officer	2023–2025
Jamie Massie	Senior Executive Advisor	2021–2025

== Seasons ==
=== Men ===
Season	League	Teams	Record	Rank	Playoffs	League cup	Canadian Championship	Ref
2022	League1 Ontario	22	13–5–3	5th	Semi-finals	–	did not qualify	
2023	League1 Ontario	21	15–1–4	2nd	Champions	–	did not qualify	
2024	League1 Ontario Premier	12	9–7–6	5th	–	Finalists	Preliminary round	
2025	League1 Ontario Premier	11	8–6–6	4th	–	Semi-finals		

=== Women ===
Season	League	Teams	Record	Rank	Playoffs	League Cup	Inter-Provincial Championship or W Canadian Championship	Ref
2022	League1 Ontario	20	12–5–2	5th	Quarter-finals	–	did not qualify	
2023	League1 Ontario	19	8–4–6	7th	did not qualify	–	did not qualify	
2024	League1 Ontario Premier/ Ontario Premier League	10	5–6–7	7th	–	Semi-finals	did not qualify	
2025	League1 Ontario Premier/ Ontario Premier League	10	14–3–1	Champions	–	Semi-finals	Champions	
2026	League1 Ontario Premier/ Ontario Premier League	10	16–2–0	Champions	–	Semi-finals		

== Honours ==
Senior

- Ontario Premier League:
  - Men's Champions: 2023
  - Women's Champions: 2025, 2026
- Premier Soccer Leagues Canada:
  - Inter-Provincial Cup Winners: 2025
- Trent Severn Cup
  - Winners: 2022, 2023

Reserves

- Ontario Premier League3:
  - Men's Champions: 2022

== Notable players ==
The following players have either played at the professional or international level, either before or after playing for the League1 Ontario team:

=== Men ===
- (England) Ethan Beckford
- (Cuba) Orlendis Benítez
- (Canada) Gabriel Boakye
- (Guyana) (Canada) Jordan Dover
- (Dominica) Trivine Esprit
- (Guyana) Javier George
- (Canada) Ricky Gomes
- (Canada) Luke Green
- (Canada) Ijah Halley
- (Saint Vincent and the Grenadines) (Canada) Micah Joseph
- (Jamaica) (Canada) Shawn-Claud Lawson
- (Canada) Jevontae Layne
- (Canada) Baj Maan
- (Canada) Reshon Phillip
- (Canada) Jarred Phillips
- (Cuba) Alejandro Portal
- (Canada) C. J. Smith
- (Canada) Nathaniel St. Louis
- (Canada) Rahim Thorpe
- (Canada) Reshaun Walkes
- (Canada) Jalen Watson

=== Women ===
- (Guyana) (Canada) Brianne Desa
- (Jamaica) (Canada) Yazmeen Jamieson
- (Canada) Holly O'Neill
- (Guyana) (Canada) Rylee Traicoff
- (Saint Kitts and Nevis) (Canada) Carley Uddenberg
- (Saint Kitts and Nevis) (Canada) Cloey Uddenberg
- (Saint Kitts and Nevis) (Canada) Kayla Uddenberg

== Club records ==
Below are current record holders for the club.

=== Men ===
Record	Record holder	Date	Ref
Largest victory	9–1 vs. Unionville Milliken	June 17, 2023	
Most appearances (Note: Includes all competitions)	Shawn-Claud Lawson (76)	2022–present	
Most career goals	Jevontae Layne(30)	2023-2024	
Home attendance	1,180	August 27, 2023	
Away attendance	2,250 (BMO Field)	April 24, 2024	

=== Women ===
Record	Record holder	Date	Ref
Largest victory	7–0 vs. ProStars FC	July 12, 2023	
Most appearances	Adriane Devlin (65)	2022–Date	
Most career goals	Ally Rowe (26)	2025	
