= Alliance United FC =

Canadian soccer team

Alliance United
- Full name: Alliance United Futbol Club
- Founded: 2017
- Dissolved: January 9, 2026
- Stadium: Varsity Stadium
- League: League1 Ontario
- 2025: L1O-P, 3rd (men); L1O-P, 10th (relegated) (women)
- Website: https://allianceunited.club/

Alliance United Futbol Club was a Canadian semi-professional soccer club based in Markham and Scarborough, Ontario. It fielded teams in both the men's and women's divisions of League1 Ontario.

The club was founded in 2017 to compete in League1 Ontario, originally as a partnership between two youth clubs - Markham FC and Wexford SC. It then became a partnership between Markham FC and Toronto High Park FC.

== Founders ==
The club was founded in 2017 as a joint partnership between clubs Markham FC and Wexford SC with the team playing out of Centennial College. The name Alliance United was initially meant to be a temporary with a 'name the team' initiative planned, but it ultimately remained the official name.

Founding clubs of Alliance United

Markham FC is a youth soccer club in Markham, Ontario. It was founded in 1971 as the Markham Minor Soccer Club, before changing its name to the Markham Youth Soccer Club. Wexford SC is a youth soccer club in Scarborough in Toronto. It was founded in 1967 as the Buchanan Soccer Club and is the longest running club in Scarborough.

In November 2023, the club became a joint partnership between Markham FC and Toronto High Park FC, with Wexford leaving the program.

== History ==
Alliance United joined the men's division of League1 Ontario for the 2018 season. They played their inaugural match on April 29, 2018 against North Mississauga SC at home, which they lost by a score of 1–0. They finished in 7th place in their debut season. They improved to a 3rd-place finish in the 2019 season, but had a very poor showing in the playoffs where they lost 15–0 to FC London on aggregate in the semi-finals over the two-game series, due to being unable to field many of their best players, who missed the series due to college and university commitments, thereby having to rely on many youth players instead.

In 2019, the club added a team in the League1 Ontario women's division. In their debut season, they finished in a three-way tie for fifth, but did not play in 2020 or 2021 due to the COVID-19 pandemic. In their return in 2022, they finished 6th in the regular season, but advanced to the Championship Final in the playoffs, where they were defeated by NDC Ontario. In addition, they advanced to the League1 Canada Women's Interprovincial Championship for 2022, as NDC Ontario was unable to compete due to player unavailability, where they finished in 3rd place, following a defeat to PLSQ side AS Laval in a penalty shootout in the semi-finals, before defeating League1 British Columbia side Varsity FC in the third-place match in another penalty shootout. In 2023, after finishing 4th in the regular season, they won the women's league championship defeating NDC Ontario in the playoff final.

In 2023, they formed an affiliation with Canadian Premier League club York United FC, which enables York United to send players to Alliance on short-term loans. On July 29, 2023, they recorded their largest victory, defeating Unionville Milliken SC by a score of 13-1. In 2024, the men's second team won the inaugural third tier League2 Ontario title, earning promotion to the second tier League1 Ontario Championship. However, they chose to decline the promotion to remain in League2 Ontario for 2025.

In January 2026, it was announced that the club sold their League1 Ontario license to International FC, ending their participation in League1 Ontario.

== Seasons ==
Men

Season	League	Teams	Record	Rank	Playoffs	League Cup	Ref
2018	League1 Ontario	17	7–3–6	7th	Group Stage	Preliminary Round	
2019	League1 Ontario	16	11–3–1	3rd	Semi-finals	–	
2020	Season cancelled due to COVID-19 pandemic						
2021	League1 Ontario Summer Championship	11	3–2–2	3rd	–	–	
2022	League1 Ontario	22	13–6–2	3rd	Semi-Finals	–	
2023	League1 Ontario	22	9–6–5	8th	did not qualify	–	
2024	League1 Ontario Premier	12	8–6–8	6th	–	Round of 16	
2025	League1 Ontario Premier	11	10–5–5	3rd	–	Round of 32	

Women

Season	League	Teams	Record	Rank	Playoffs	League Cup	Interprovinical Championship	Ref
2019	League1 Ontario	14	6–2–5	7th	Quarter-finals	–	–	
2020	Season cancelled due to COVID-19 pandemic							
2021	Did not enter due to COVID-19 pandemic							
2022	League1 Ontario	20	11–4–4	6th	Finalists	–	3rd	
2023	League1 Ontario	19	10–5–3	4th	Champions	–	4th	
2024	League1 Ontario Premier	10	5–4–9	8th	–	Round of 16	Did not qualify	
2025	League1 Ontario Premier	10	1–7–10	10th ↓	–	Finalists	Did not qualify	

== Notable former players ==
The following players have either played at the professional or international level, either before or after playing for the League1 Ontario team:

=== Men ===
- (Canada) Ife Adenuga
- (Tanzania) Prince Amanda
- (Canada) Daniel Da Silva
- (Canada) Zak Drake
- (Tunisia) Mehdi Essoussi
- (Canada) Steven Furlano
- (Canada) Sam Gardner
- (Canada) Aleksa Marković
- (Canada) Lukas MacNaughton
- (Canada) Nicholas Osorio
- (Ukraine) Bohdan Polyakhov
- (Ukraine) Denys Rylskyi
- (Canada) Nikola Stakic

=== Women ===
- (Guyana) Jade Vyfhuis
