= Ontario Premier League =

Semi-pro soccer league in Ontario, Canada

Ontario Premier League; Men's Division
- Organising body: Ontario Soccer Association
- Founded: November 15, 2013; 13 years ago
- First season: 2014
- Country: Canada
- Province: Ontario
- Confederation: CONCACAF (North American Football Union)
- Number of clubs: 12 (OPL 1); 12 (OPL 2); 28 (OPL 3)
- Level on pyramid: 3
- Domestic cup: Canadian Championship
- League cup: OPL Cup
- International cup(s): CONCACAF Champions Cup (via Canadian Championship)
- Current champions: Scrosoppi FC (2026)
- Current OPL Cup: Woodbridge Strikers (2026)
- Most championships: Vaughan Azzurri (3 titles)
- Most OPL Cups: Vaughan Azzurri (4 titles)
- Website: www.oplsoccer.ca
- Current: 2026 Ontario Premier League season

The Ontario Premier League (formerly known as League1 Ontario) is a semi-professional men's soccer league in Ontario, Canada. The league is sanctioned by the Canadian Soccer Association and the Ontario Soccer Association.

The Ontario Premier League consists of three tiers, with promotion and relegation between them. The top-two tiers consist of 12 teams each, while the lowest tier is uncapped in size.

In the Canadian soccer league system, the men's division is behind the fully-professional Canadian Premier League. It is part of Premier Soccer Leagues Canada (formerly League1 Canada), the national third tier with regional divisions, along with four other provincial leagues including the British Columbia Premier League, Alberta Premier League, Prairies Premier League, and LS Pro Québec. The league champion qualifies for the Canadian Championship, Canada's domestic cup tournament. Dino Rossi serves as the commissioner of the league.

== History ==
=== Origins ===
League1 Ontario was founded on November 15, 2013, in an announcement by the Ontario Soccer Association (OSA) that it would pilot the semi-professional league in 2014 and 2015 as a key pillar of long-term player development in Canada. The league would be administered by DG Sports, who also operate the province's amateur Ontario Soccer League, with Dino Rossi serving as commissioner. OSA President Ron Smale stated that the league's core group of players are to consist of U-23s, with League1 complementing the newly formed Ontario Player Development League (OPDL) elite youth league as a pathway for professional player development.

On April 8, 2014, the OSA revealed its plans for the inaugural season of League1 which would begin during the final weekend in May 2014. The season featured 10 teams, chosen through a standards-based application process, which were: ANB Futbol, Durham Power FC, Internacional de Toronto, Kingston Cataraqui Clippers, Master's FA, Sigma FC, Toronto FC Academy, Vaughan Azzurri, Windsor Stars and Woodbridge Strikers. The league champion would face the champion of the Première ligue de soccer du Québec in the Inter-Provincial Cup to determine the national Division III champion.

Dylan Sacramento of Toronto FC Academy scored the first ever goal in the league with a 10th-minute strike against Vaughan Azzurri. In the same game, Mateo Restrepo received the league's first red card. On July 22, 2014, the league and the Ontario Soccer Association announced the termination of Internacional de Toronto's license agreement due to "failure to comply with agreed-upon league standards", with league matches rescheduled for the season to accommodate the change. Toronto FC Academy were crowned the inaugural league champions on October 4, 2014, after defeating the Cataraqui Clippers 3–1 to secure the top place in the regular season standings. Vaughan Azzurri and Sigma FC contested the inaugural League1 Cup on October 19, 2014, at BMO Field, with the Azzurri winning the single-game cup final 2–1 to be crowned champions.

As the number of teams in the league continued to grow through expansion, the league introduced a two-conference format with the winner of each conference facing off in a championship match. After the 2016 season, the Inter-Provincial Cup was cancelled, with the winners of League1 Ontario and the PLSQ instead advancing to the national Canadian Championship the following season, beginning in 2018.

In 2018, the league returned to a single division, introducing playoffs for the top finishers of the league to decide the league champion. The League Cup tournament was eliminated the following season.

On November 14, 2018, the Canadian Premier League announced its purchase of League1 Ontario. According to L1O commissioner Dino Rossi, L1O would serve as "CPL's official development league."

Due to restrictions associated with the COVID-19 pandemic, the league cancelled the 2020 season and delayed the start of the 2021 season. In 2022, L1O joined League1 Canada as a founding member. League1 Canada is an alliance of soccer leagues that operate at the pro-am level.

=== Reorganization and rebranding ===
In 2024, League1 Ontario restructured from a single league into a three-tier competition. Existing teams were assigned to one of the top-two tiers based on the number of points they earned in the previous two seasons. The top-tier "League1 Ontario Premier" division included the top 12 teams while the second tier "League1 Ontario Championship" division featured the remaining 10 teams (with expansion to 12 teams in the 2025 season). Along with this, a third tier known as League2 Ontario debuted in 2024 with 24 teams that included existing club B teams and new teams joining the league. League2 was created as an entry point for expansion clubs to the L1O system.

Under the reorganization, teams have the ability to move up and down between tiers through a process of promotion and relegation. The 2024 season also saw the return of the L1 Cup, a league cup knockout tournament which features teams from all three tiers of the L1O system.

In January 2026, the league rebranded as the Ontario Premier League and adopted a new logo. This change coinceded with rebrands to Premier Soccer Leagues Canada (formerly League1 Canada) and the Canadian Premier League, to create a unified identity. The three tiers of the Ontario Premier League were renamed to Ontario Premier League 1, Ontario Premier League 2, and Ontario Premier League 3.

== Competition format ==
League1 Ontario structure (2026)
Tier	Division
1	Ontario Premier League 1; 12 teams ↓ relegate 1 or 2
2	Ontario Premier League 2; 12 teams ↑ promote 1 or 2 ↓ relegate 1
3	Ontario Premier League 3; 28 teams in 3 conferences ↑ promote 1

Ontario Premier League clubs are grouped into three divisions: OPL1, OPL2, and OPL3 (formerly League1 Premier, League1 Championship, and League2 Ontario, respectively). The regular season runs from April to August in which teams only play against other teams in their division. The top-two tiers use a single table round-robin format while the lowest tier is further subdivided into regional groupings. The team that accumulates the most points during the season is crowned league champions. In 2016 and 2017, the league champion was determined by a single match playoff between the winners of the east and west divisions. From 2018 to 2023, a larger playoff format was used.

Promotion and relegation results in the OPL2 team that is crowned champions being automatically be promoted to OPL1, while the team at the bottom of the OPL1 standings will be automatically relegated to OPL2. A direct swap between the best and worst sides is the first of its kind in not just Canada, but North America. A playoff will also happen between the OPL 1 and 2, where the team second from bottom (11th) in the OPL1 will face the second-placed team in the OPL2 in an all-or-nothing game for a place in the top tier in the next season.

Since 2017, the winner of the top division has qualified for the Canadian Championship. At the end of each season, the winner of the OPL2 and OPL3 divisions are promoted to the next tier up while the bottom team in the OPL1 and OPL2 divisions are relegated down.

Beginning in 2019, the Supporters Trophy was created by the Rogue Street Elite supporter group of North Mississauga SC to be given to the regular season champions.

=== OPL Cup ===

The OPL Cup (originally known as the L1 Cup) is a league cup tournament that features all OPL clubs. It runs concurrently with the regular season, with cup games usually taking place mid-week. It is not a form of playoffs and all matches are separate from the regular season and are not reflected in the season standings. The 2014 and 2015 cups included a group stage and a knockout stage but from 2016 to 2018 the format was a single-elimination tournament. Following a hiatus from 2019 to 2023, the OPL Cup returned in 2024, coinciding with the league's restructuring.

== Clubs ==
As of 2026 there are 28 clubs of whom 4 are based in Toronto, 13 are based elsewhere in the Greater Toronto Area, 10 are based in other cities in Southern Ontario and there is 1 club based in Northern Ontario. Three more clubs compete in different leagues at a comparable level, the Thunder Bay Chill from Prairies Premier League and Ottawa South United and West Ottawa SC from LS Pro Québec.

Southern Ontario Ontario Premier League 1 Ontario Premier League 2 Ontario Premier League 3 Greater Toronto Area

Greater Toronto Area Ontario Premier League 1 Ontario Premier League 2 Ontario Premier League 3

=== Ontario Premier League 1 ===
The league has 12 teams participating in the 2026 season.

Team	City	Stadium	Capacity	Founded	Debut
Current teams
Burlington SC	Burlington	Corpus Christi CSS		1962	2022
International FC	Vaughan	Zanchin Automotive Soccer Centre	2,200	2009	2026
North Toronto Nitros	Toronto	Downsview Park	1,000	1980	2016 (Note: North Toronto Nitros was on hiatus in 2018 & 2019, and returned in 2020)
Oakville SC (Note: Oakville SC operated as Oakville Blue Devils FC until the 2021 season and Blue Devils FC between the 2021 and 2024 season prior to their merger)	Oakville	Bronte Athletic Park	500	1972	2015
Scrosoppi FC	Milton	Saint Francis Xavier CSS		2020	2021
Sigma FC	Mississauga	Paramount Fine Foods Centre/Hamilton Stadium	5,400	2005	2014
Simcoe County Rovers FC	Barrie	J.C. Massie Field	1,200	2021	2022
St. Catharines Roma Wolves	St. Catharines	Club Roma Stadium	1,500	1967	2021
Sudbury Cyclones	Sudbury	James Jerome Sports Complex		2023	2024
Unionville Milliken SC	Unionville	Zanchin Automotive Soccer Centre (Vaughan)	2,000	1976	2018
Vaughan Azzurri	Vaughan	North Maple Regional Park	500	1982	2014
Woodbridge Strikers	Woodbridge	Vaughan Grove Park	1,000	1976	2014

=== Ontario Premier League 2 ===
The league has 12 teams participating in the 2026 season.

Team	City	Stadium	Capacity	Founded	Debut
Current teams
Cambridge United	Cambridge	Fountain Street Soccer Complex		1973	2025
FC London	London	Tricar Field	900	2008	2016
Guelph United	Guelph	Centennial Bowl	500	2020	2021
Hamilton United	Hamilton	Ron Joyce Stadium	6,000	2013	2020 (Note: The 2020 season was cancelled delaying their debut to the following year)
Inter Toronto II (Note: Inter Toronto II was known as York United FC Academy in 2025)	Toronto	York Lions Stadium	4,000	2024	2025
Master's FA	Scarborough	L'Amoreaux Sports Complex	200	2009	2014
North Mississauga SC	Mississauga	Churchill Meadows (Mattamy Sports Park)	200	1982	2016
Pickering FC (Note: Pickering FC was known as Durham United FC/FA until the end of 2019)	Pickering	Pickering Soccer Centre		1984	2014 (Note: Durham United was on hiatus in 2018 & returned in 2019 Pickering FC went on hiatus for 2023 & returned in 2024.)
The Borough FC	Scarborough (Toronto)	Birchmount Stadium	2,000	2011	2024
Waterloo United (Note: Between 2022 and 2024, Waterloo United was known as BVB IA Waterloo)	Waterloo	RIM Park	1,700	1971	2021
Whitby FC (Note: Whitby FC was known as Darby FC from 2018 to 2024)	Whitby	Telus Dome	1,000	1966	2018
Windsor City FC (Note: Windsor City FC was known as Windsor Stars from 2014 to 2016 and known as Windsor TFC from 2017 to 2022)	Windsor	St. Clair College	2,000	2004	2014

=== Ontario Premier League 3 ===
The league has 28 teams participating in the 2026 season.

Team	City	Stadium	Founded	Debut
Current teams
Northeast Conference
International FC B	Vaughan	Mount Joy Sports Dome (Markham)	Reserve team	
Kingston Sentinels	Kingston	CaraCo Home Field	2025	2026
Master's FA B	Scarborough / North York (Toronto)	Alumni Field	Reserve team	
Pickering FC B	Pickering	Pickering Soccer Centre	Reserve team	
Richmond Hill SC	Richmond Hill	Richmond Green Park	1968	2026
The Borough FC B	Scarborough (Toronto)	Birchmount Stadium	Reserve team	
Unionville Milliken SC B	Unionville (Markham)	Zanchin Automotive Soccer Centre (Vaughan)	Reserve team	
Whitby FC B	Whitby	Telus Dome	Reserve team	
Central Conference
Inter Toronto III	Toronto	Zanchin Automotive Soccer Centre (Vaughan)	Reserve team	
North Mississauga SC B	Mississauga	Churchill Meadows (Mattamy Sports Park)	Reserve team	
North Toronto Nitros B	North York (Toronto)	Downsview Park	Reserve team	
Rush Canada SA	Oakville	Sheridan Trafalgar Campus	2014	2024
Scrosoppi FC B	Milton	Saint Francis Xavier CSS	Reserve team	
Sigma FC B	Mississauga	Paramount Fine Foods Centre	Reserve team	
Simcoe County Rovers FC B	Barrie	J.C. Massie Field	Reserve team	
Sudbury Cyclones B	Sudbury	James Jerome Sports Complex	Reserve team	
Vaughan Azzurri B	Vaughan	North Maple Regional Park	Reserve team	
Woodbridge Strikers B	Woodbridge (Vaughan)	Vaughan Grove Field	Reserve team	
Southwest Conference
Burlington SC B	Burlington	Ron Joyce Field (Mcmaster stadium)	Reserve team	
Cambridge United B	Cambridge	Fountain Street Soccer Complex	Reserve team	
FC London B	London	Tricar Field	Reserve team	
Guelph United FC B	Guelph	Eastview Community Park	Reserve team	
Hamilton United B	Hamilton	Ron Joyce Stadium	Reserve team	
Oakville SC B	Oakville	North Park	Reserve team	
Railway City FC	St. Thomas	1Password Park	2024	2025
St. Catharines Roma Wolves B	St. Catharines	Club Roma	Reserve team	
Waterloo United B	Waterloo	RIM Park	Reserve team	
Windsor City FC B	Windsor	St. Clair College	Reserve team	

=== Former clubs ===
Former clubs
Team	City	Stadium	First season	Final season
1812 FC Barrie	Brampton (Note: 1812 FC Barrie was originally set to play in Barrie; however, due to the COVID-19 pandemic, they spent their only season in Brampton)	Terry Fox Stadium	2021	
Alliance United FC	Markham, Toronto		2017	2025
ANB Futbol	King	The Country Day School	2014	2015
Aurora FC (Note: Aurora FC was known as Aurora United during the 2016 season)	Aurora	Stewart Burnett Park	2016	2020
Electric City FC	Peterborough	Fleming College Stadium	2022	2023
Internacional de Toronto	Toronto	Lamport Stadium	2014	
Kingston Clippers (Note: Kingston Clippers was known as Cataraqui Clippers during 2014 season)	Kingston	Tindall Field, Queen's University	2014	2016
Ottawa South United (Note: Moved to PLSQ from the 2020 season)	Manotick (Ottawa)	Quinn's Pointe	2017	2019
ProStars FC	Brampton	Victoria Park Stadium	2015	2024
Sanjaxx Lions	Toronto	Monarch Park Stadium	2015	2018
Toronto FC Academy (Note: Toronto FC Academy played in League1 Ontario from 2014 to 2018, before returning in 2024. They were known as Toronto FC III between 2017 and 2018.)	Toronto	BMO Training Ground	2014	2024
Toronto Skillz FC	Toronto	Birchmount Stadium	2016	2021

== Organization ==
=== Regulations ===
League1 Ontario was founded with a series of values, objectives and standards all aimed at furthering the league's stated objective of improving player development in Ontario and Canada. Some of these regulations include:

- Standards-based club licensing, renewed annually (not a franchise/ownership model). Standards include technical, organizational, facility and financial criteria.
- Maximum of 3 non-Canadian players per club.
- Maximum of 7 substitutions per match.
- Maximum of 9 substitutes can be named to the bench.

League1 Ontario is an open-age league however there are several rules designed to give playing opportunities to young players. For the 2022 season, teams were required to have at least eight U-23 players on each match-day roster and to give U-20 players a total of at least 2,000 minutes across the regular season. In 2024, the "eight U-23 player rule" was removed and replaced by a minutes quota. U-23 players must now play at least 41% of available minutes across the season (9,000 in Premier division) and U-20 players must play 11% of available minutes (2,500 in Premier division).

== Honours ==
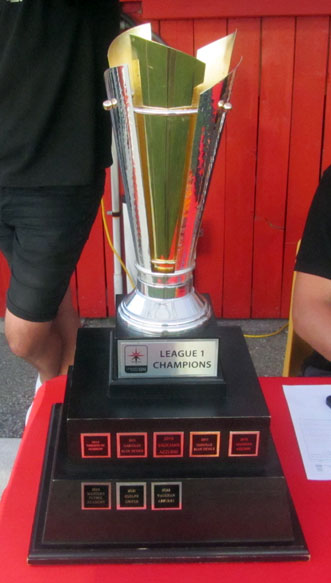
League1 Ontario Championship trophy

Bold indicates clubs that played in the 2026 season. From 2016 to 2023, the winner of the playoffs determined the league champion.

Premier division champions
Club	Wins	Runner-up	Winning seasons	Runner-up seasons
**Vaughan Azzurri**	3	1	2016, 2018, 2022	2024
**Oakville SC**	2	2	2015, 2017	2021, 2022
**Scrosoppi FC**	2	2	2024, 2026	2023, 2025
**Woodbridge Strikers SC**	1	5	2025	2014, 2015, 2017, 2018, 2026
Toronto FC Academy	1	0	2014	–
**Master's FA**	1	0	2019	–
**Guelph United FC**	1	0	2021	–
**Simcoe County Rovers FC**	1	0	2023	–
**FC London**	0	2	–	2016, 2019

=== Yearly results ===
Trophy winners (2014–2023)
Season	Teams	Regular season	Playoffs	L1 Cup
2014	9 (Note: Originally, 10 clubs were in the league, but Internacional de Toronto was removed from the league mid-season.)	**Toronto FC Academy**	—	Vaughan Azzurri
2015	12	**Oakville Blue Devils**	—	Woodbridge Strikers
2016	16	Vaughan Azzurri (E) FC London (W)	**Vaughan Azzurri**	Vaughan Azzurri (2)
2017	16	Woodbridge Strikers (E) Oakville Blue Devils (W)	**Oakville Blue Devils** (2)	Woodbridge Strikers (2)
2018	17	FC London	**Vaughan Azzurri** (2)	Vaughan Azzurri (3)
2019	16	Oakville Blue Devils	**Master's FA**	—
2020	17	Season cancelled due to COVID-19 pandemic		
2021	15 (Note: Originally, 21 clubs were set to participate, but some clubs opted out of the main division due to scheduling impacts caused by the COVID-19 pandemic. Some clubs participated in a separate short-season division.)	Vaughan Azzurri (E) Guelph United (W)	**Guelph United**	—
2022	22	Vaughan Azzurri	**Vaughan Azzurri** (3)	—
2023	21	Scrosoppi FC	**Simcoe County Rovers**	—

Trophy winners (2024–present)
Season	Premier division	Championship division	League2 division	L1 Cup
2024	**Scrosoppi FC**	Toronto FC Academy	Alliance United FC B	Vaughan Azzurri (4)
2025	**Woodbridge Strikers**	Unionville Milliken SC	St. Catharines Roma Wolves B	Scrosoppi FC
Season	OPL1 division	OPL2 division	OPL3 division	OPL Cup
2026	**Scrosoppi FC** (2)	Master's FA	Woodbridge Strikers B	Woodbridge Strikers (3)

== Reserve division ==
In 2019, L1O launched a men's U21 Reserve Division open to existing League1 Ontario or Ontario Player Development League license holders. The inaugural year will consist of a 12-game summer season and a separate 10-game fall season. Nine teams will participate in the 2019 summer season with a possibility of more teams joining for the fall.

== Players who earned national team caps while in OPL ==
The following players have earned a senior national team cap while playing in the Ontario Premier League (the year of their first cap while playing in the league is listed). Players who earned caps before or after playing in OPL are not included, unless they also earned caps while in the league. This section also does not include youth caps (U23 or below).

Player	Country	Year	Ref
Shaquille Agard	Guyana	2014	
Adrian Butters	Guyana	2015	
Kilian Elkinson	Bermuda	2016	
Anthony Whyte	Guyana	2016	
Daniel Whyte	Guyana	2016	
Daniel Jodah	Guyana	2017	
Jelani Smith	Guyana	2017	
Navid Rahman	Pakistan	2018	
Alain Sargeant	Saint Kitts and Nevis	2018	
Justin Springer	Saint Kitts and Nevis	2018	
Kaeson Trench	Barbados	2018	
Tristan Marshall	Saint Vincent and the Grenadines	2019	
Tyrell Rayne	Antigua and Barbuda	2019	
Rahbar Wahed Khan	Bangladesh	2021	
Quillan Roberts	Guyana	2022	
Zachary Ellis-Hayden	Barbados	2023	
Emery Welshman	Guyana	2023	
Tre Crosby	Saint Vincent and the Grenadines	2024	
Micah Joseph	Saint Vincent and the Grenadines	2024	
Taj Moore	Antigua and Barbuda	2024	
Milton Joseph	Saint Vincent and the Grenadines	2025	

== See also ==
- Premier Soccer Leagues Canada
- Ontario Premier League (women)
