= International FC =

Soccer club in Vaughan, Ontario

- Full name: International Football Club
- Founded: 2009; 17 years ago
- Stadium: Dufferin Community Centre
- Head coach: Giuseppe Mattace Raso (men); Manny Corona (women)
- League: Ontario Premier League
- Website: https://www.intlfc.com/

International Football Club is a Canadian semi-professional soccer club based in Vaughan, Ontario that competes in the men's and women's division of the Ontario Premier League.

== History ==
International FC was founded as a youth soccer academy in 2009. In 2021, the club formed an affiliation with League1 Ontario club Unionville Milliken SC. In 2022, they formed an affiliation with Master's FA in League1 Ontario.

In January 2026, the club acquired the League1 Ontario license of Alliance United FC and would take over their spots in the top tier Premier Division for the men and the second tier Championship division for the women, as well as fielding second teams for both genders in the third tier League2 Ontario. They will play their debut season at the Ontario Soccer Centre, while their regular home venue, Dufferin Community Centre, undergoes construction to meet League1 Ontario standards for the 2027 season.
