= Richmond Hill SC =

Soccer club in Richmond Hill, Ontario

- Full name: Richmond Hill Soccer Club
- Nickname: Raiders
- Founded: 1968; 58 years ago
- Stadium: Richmond Green Park
- Chairman: Pradeepta Chakravarti
- Head coach: Henrich Svetko
- League: Ontario Premier League 3
- Website: https://richmondhillsoccer.com/

Richmond Hill Soccer Club is a Canadian semi-professional soccer club based in Richmond Hill, Ontario that competes in the men's and women's division of Ontario Premier League 3.

== History ==
The club was founded in 1968 as a youth soccer club. In 2019, the club was one of the original clubs to receive the Canadian Soccer Association National Youth License.

After participating as a guest club in the Ontario Premier League Reserve Division for a few years, they joined as an official member for the 2026 season, with an expansion team in Ontario Premier League 3. The men's team played their first match on April 24 against Master's FA B, while the women's first match was the next day against Scrosoppi FC B, with both matches ending in 1-1 draws.
