= Oakville SC =

Ontario amateur soccer club

- Full name: Oakville Soccer Club
- Stadium: Sheridan Trafalgar Stadium
- Head coach: Duncan Wilde (men); Carli Tingstad (women)
- League: Ontario Premier League
- 2025: L1O-P, 5th (men); L1O-C, 3rd (women)
- Website: http://www.oakvillesoccer.ca/
Home colours	Away colours

Oakville Soccer Club is a semi-professional soccer club based in Oakville, Ontario. The senior men's and women's teams currently compete in the Ontario Premier League men's and women's divisions. In late 2024, Oakville SC merged with Blue Devils FC to become one club, absorbing the Blue Devils under their banner.

== History ==
=== Merger ===
Oakville Soccer Club was created in 1972 as a youth soccer club through the merger of the Bronte Legion Soccer Club, Oakville United Soccer Club and Oakville Minor Soccer. In August 2023, they formed a partnership with League1 Ontario club Blue Devils FC. In October 2024, they fully merged with the club under the Oakville SC banner. Oakville SC had previously entered their own reserve teams in the League1 Ontario reserve divisions.

== Seasons ==
=== Men ===
Season	League	Teams	Record	Rank	Playoffs	League Cup	Ref
2025	League1 Ontario Premier	11	8–5–7	5th	–	Round of 16	

=== Women ===
Season	League	Teams	Record	Rank	Playoffs	League Cup	Ref
2025	League1 Ontario Championship	9	8–2–6	3rd	–	Round of 16	
