= Unionville Milliken SC =

Canadian soccer team

- Full name: Unionville Milliken Soccer Club
- Nickname: UMSC Strikers
- Founded: 1976
- Stadium: Centennial College Turf
- Head Coach: Filipe Bento (men); Paul Omoghan (women)
- League: Ontario Premier League
- 2026: L1O-C, 1st - promoted (men); L1O-C, 7th (women)
- Website: www.u-msc.com

Unionville Milliken Soccer Club is a Canadian semi-professional soccer club based in Unionville, Ontario. The club was founded in 1976 as a youth soccer club and added its women's and men's semi-professional teams in the Ontario Premier League (formerly League1 Ontario) in 2017 and 2018 respectively.

== History ==
The club was founded in 1976 to serve the communities of Unionville and Milliken in Ontario.

Originally a youth soccer club, the team added semi-professional teams in League1 Ontario (now the Ontario Premier League in the women's division in 2017, followed by a men's team in 2018. In their inaugural season, the women's team finished in 4th place. Unionville announced that their club would go with a fully professional model, as opposed to an amateur or semi-professional approach, becoming the second fully professional team in the league, after Toronto FC III.

The men's team was formed through a partnership with York Region Shooters, who played in the Canadian Soccer League until 2017, to form a professional club in L1O to begin in 2018, created through the relationship of Shooters' owner Tony De Thomasis and UMSC coach Filipe Bento. They played their inaugural match on April 29, 2018 against Windsor TFC, which resulted in a 3–1 victory. In 2022, the women's reserve team won the League1 Ontario Reserve Division.

In 2025, the men's team won the League1 Ontario Championship, earning promotion to the League1 Premier division for 2026.

== Seasons ==
=== Men ===
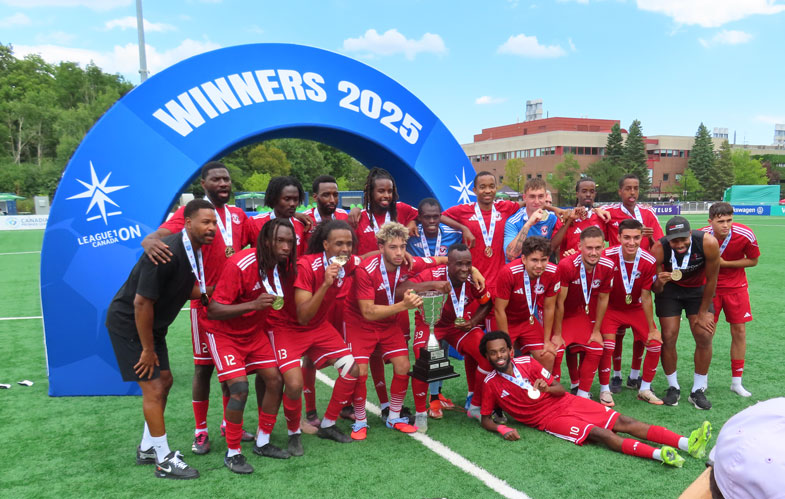
Unionville-Milliken SC celebrate 2025 League1 Ontario Championship title

Season	League	Teams	Record	Rank	Playoffs	League Cup	Ref
2018	League1 Ontario	17	6–5–5	8th	Group stage	Round of 16	
2019	League1 Ontario	16	3–3–9	12th	Did not qualify	–	
2020	League1 Ontario	Season cancelled due to COVID-19 pandemic					
2021	League1 Ontario	15	5–2–5	4th, East (8th overall)	Did not qualify	–	
2022	League1 Ontario	22	4–2–15	20th	Did not qualify	–	
2023	League1 Ontario	21	1–1–18	20th	Did not qualify	–	
2024	League1 Ontario Championship	10	9–3–6	4th	–	Round of 32	
2025	League1 Ontario Championship	12	13–4–5	1st ↑	–	Quarter-finals	

=== Women ===
Season	League	Teams	Record	Rank	Playoffs	League Cup	Ref
2017	League1 Ontario	11	10–3–7	4th	–	Quarter-finals	
2018	League1 Ontario	13	5–3–4	8th	Did not qualify	Finalists	
2019	League1 Ontario	14	5–5–4	11th	Did not qualify	–	
2020	Season cancelled due to COVID-19 pandemic						
2021	League1 Ontario Summer Championship	7	2–1–3	5th	–	–	
2022	League1 Ontario	20	7–1–10	14th	Did not qualify	–	
2023	League1 Ontario	19	7–0–11	13th	Did not qualify	–	
2024	League1 Ontario Championship	10	6–6–6	6th	–	Round of 32	
2025	League1 Ontario Championship	9	4–4–8	7th	–	Round of 32	

== Notable former players ==
The following players have either played at the professional or international level, either before or after playing for the League1 Ontario team:

=== Men ===
- (Nigeria) George Akpabio
- (Canada) Ezequiel Carrasco
- (Canada) Micah Chisholm
- (Canada) Joseph Di Chiara
- (Bulgaria) Kiril Dimitrov
- (Jamaica) Richard Edwards
- (Canada) Trivine Esprit
- (Canada) Duwayne Ewart
- (Canada) Taylor Lord
- (Canada) Cale Loughrey
- (England) Rohan Ricketts
- (Saint Kitts and Nevis) Alain Sargeant
- (Canada) John Smits
- (Canada) Jordan Webb
- (Jamaica) Richard West
- (Serbia) Bojan Zoranović

=== Women ===
- (Canada) Samantha Chang
- (Guyana) (Canada) Calaigh Copland
- (Canada) Kennedy Faulknor
- (Canada) Kayla Gonçalves
- (Guyana) (Canada) Julia Gonsalves
- (Guyana) (Canada) Olivia Gonsalves
- (Canada) Olivia Mbala
- (Canada) Jade Rose
- (Guyana) (Canada) Jade Vyfhuis
