= Tre Crosby =

Vincentian footballer (born 1995)

Personal information
- Date of birth: January 2, 1995 (age 31)
- Place of birth: Toronto, Ontario, Canada
- Position: Midfielder

Youth career
- Unionville Milliken SC
- –2012: Toronto FC
- FC Erzgebirge Aue

Senior career*
Years	Team	Apps	(Gls)
2012	SC Toronto		
2014	Erzgebirge Aue II	0	(0)
2016	Vaughan Azzurri	1	(0)
2016	K-W United FC	11	(0)
2016–2017	Vaughan Azzurri	5	(0)
2018–2019	Unionville Milliken SC	24	(7)
2019	Darby FC	4	(0)
2021	Unionville Milliken SC	10	(1)
2022	Simcoe County Rovers FC	13	(0)
2023	ProStars FC	8	(0)
2024	Unionville Milliken SC	2	(0)

International career^{‡}
2024–	Saint Vincent and the Grenadines	1	(0)
- * Club domestic league appearances and goals as of May 3, 2024 ‡ National team caps and goals as of October 10, 2024

Tre Crosby (born January 2, 1995) is a footballer. Born in Canada, he represents the Saint Vincent and the Grenadines national team. He plays as a midfielder.

== Early life ==
Crosby started off playing youth soccer with Unionville Milliken SC, later joining the Toronto FC Academy.

== Club career ==
In 2012, he played with SC Toronto in the Canadian Soccer League.

He began the 2014–15 season with German club Erzgebirge Aue II in the NOFV-Oberliga Süd.

Crosby began the 2016 season with Vaughan Azzurri in League1 Ontario playing one match in May, before joining K-W United in the Premier Development League for their 2016 season, then returned to Vaughan Azzurri for the remainder of the 2016 season. He remained with Vaughan for the 2017 season.

In 2018, he joined Unionville Milliken SC. In 2019, he began the season with Unionville Milliken, before joining Darby FC mid-season. In 2021, he returned to Unionville Milliken SC. In 2022, he joined the Simcoe County Rovers. In 2023, he played with ProStars FC. In 2024, he returned to Unionville Milliken.

== International career ==
In 2018, Crosby was called up to the Canada U18 team for a camp in Guatemala.

In May 2021, he was called up to the Saint Vincent and the Grenadines national football team for the first time.

== Career statistics ==
=== Club ===
As of August 19, 2024

Club	Season	League			Playoffs		Cup		Other		Total	
Club	Season	Division	Apps	Goals	Apps	Goals	Apps	Goals	Apps	Goals	Apps	Goals
Erzgebirge Aue II	2014–15	NOFV-Oberliga Süd	0	0	–		–		–		0	0
K-W United FC	2016	Premier Development League	11	0	1	0	–		–		12	0
Vaughan Azzurri	2016	League1 Ontario	3	0	0	0	–		0	0	3	0
Vaughan Azzurri	2017	League1 Ontario	3	0	–		–		–		4	0
Vaughan Azzurri	Total		6	0	0	0	0	0	0	0	6	0
Unionville Milliken SC	2018	League1 Ontario	16	6	3	0	–		?	?	19	3
Unionville Milliken SC	2019	League1 Ontario	8	1	–		–		–		8	1
Unionville Milliken SC	Total		24	7	3	0	0	0	0	0	27	1
Darby FC	2019	League1 Ontario	4	0	–		–		–		4	0
Unionville Milliken SC	2021	League1 Ontario	10	1	–		–		–		10	1
Simcoe County Rovers FC	2022	League1 Ontario	13	0	2	0	–		–		15	0
ProStars FC	2023	League1 Ontario	8	0	–		–		–		8	0
Unionville Milliken SC	2024	League1 Ontario Championship	2	0	–		–		1	0	3	0
Career total			78	8	5	0	0	0	1	0	84	8

=== International ===
As of matches played October 10, 2024

National team	Year	Apps	Goals
Saint Vincent and the Grenadines	2024	1	0
Total		1	0
