= Reshon Phillip =

Canadian soccer player (born 1998)

Personal information
- Full name: Reshon Shemar Phillip
- Date of birth: January 27, 1998 (age 28)
- Place of birth: Brampton, Ontario, Canada
- Height: 1.78 m (5 ft 10 in)
- Position: Forward

Team information
- Current team: ProStars FC

Youth career
- Toronto Eagles SC
- Brampton East SC
- 2013–2014: North Mississauga SC
- 2014–2016: Toronto FC

College career
| Years | Team | Apps | (Gls) |
| 2017 | Indian Hills Warriors | 20 | (12) |

Senior career*
| Years | Team | Apps | (Gls) |
| 2015–2016 | Toronto FC III | 14+ | (6+) |
| 2015–2016 | Toronto FC II | 7 | (2) |
| 2018 | Master's FA | 4 | (1) |
| 2019 | Oakville Blue Devils | 7 | (2) |
| 2021 | Blue Devils FC | 1 | (0) |
| 2021 | Master's FA | 9 | (11) |
| 2022 | Simcoe County Rovers | 12 | (2) |
| 2023 | ProStars FC | 3 | (0) |
| 2026– | Master's FA | 1 | (0) |
- * Club domestic league appearances and goals as of July 11, 2026

Reshon Shemar Phillip (born January 27, 1998) is a Canadian soccer player who plays as a forward for Master's FA in the Ontario Premier League 2.

== Early life ==
Born to Grenadian parents, Phillip started his career with Toronto Eagles SC at the age of 4. He later joined North Mississauga SC, with whom he won a U15 Ontario Cup.

== Playing career ==
Having joined Toronto FC Academy, he was called up to Toronto FC II, the feeder club of the MLS side, in 2015. Phillip made his professional debut in a 2–2 draw against Charlotte Independence on August 30, 2015. He scored his first senior goal a week later, netting two goals in a 3–2 win over FC Montreal on September 5, 2015 in his first professional start, which earned USL Team of the Week honours. Phillip was called up to the Toronto FC II once again for the 2016 USL season.

In the fall of 2017, Phillip made a move to play with Indian Hills Community College, a National Junior College Athletic Association school, helping them to qualify for their first national tournament appearance in program history. He was named to the ICCAC All-Conference team after leading the conference in assists with 16 (6ht highest in the nation) to go along with 12 goals. He was named a 2017 United Soccer Coaches Junior College Division I Second Team All-American.

In 2018, he played for Master's FA in League1 Ontario. In 2019, he switched to play for the Oakville Blue Devils. In 2021, he began the season with the Blue Devils for one match, before returning to Master's where he scored 11 regular season goals to be named East Division MVP and an East 1st team All-Star, also scoring a brace in a penalty kick shootout loss in the playoff semi-finals to eventual champions, Guelph United.

In 2022, he signed with the expansion side Simcoe County Rovers of League1 Ontario.

In 2023, he joined ProStars FC.

== International career ==
In 2010, he was part of a U12 Canada East squad that faced Canada West to try to represent the nation at the Danone Nations Cup in South Africa. In 2014, Phillip was first involved in an official Canadian youth camp as a 16-year-old.

== Career statistics ==
As of July 13, 2022

| Club | Season | League | League | | Playoffs | | Domestic Cup | | League Cup | | Total | |
| Club | Season | League | Apps | Goals | Apps | Goals | Apps | Goals | Apps | Goals | Apps | Goals |
|---|---|---|---|---|---|---|---|---|---|---|---|---|
| Toronto FC II | 2015 | USL | 4 | 2 | — | | — | | — | | 4 | 2 |
| Toronto FC II | 2016 | USL | 3 | 0 | — | | — | | — | | 3 | 0 |
| Toronto FC II | Total | | 7 | 2 | 0 | 0 | 0 | 0 | 0 | 0 | 7 | 2 |
| Toronto FC III | 2016 | PDL | 5 | 1 | — | | — | | — | | 5 | 1 |
| Toronto FC III | 2016 | League1 Ontario | 9 | 5 | — | | — | | ? | ? | 9 | 5 |
| Toronto FC III | Total | | 14 | 6 | 0 | 0 | 0 | 0 | 0 | 0 | 14 | 6 |
| Master's FA | 2018 | League1 Ontario | 4 | 1 | — | | — | | ? | ? | 4 | 1 |
| Blue Devils FC | 2019 | League1 Ontario | 7 | 2 | 3 | 0 | — | | — | | 10 | 2 |
| Blue Devils FC | 2021 | League1 Ontario | 1 | 0 | 0 | 0 | — | | — | | 1 | 0 |
| Master's FA | 2021 | League1 Ontario | 9 | 11 | 1 | 2 | — | | — | | 10 | 13 |
| Simcoe County Rovers | 2022 | League1 Ontario | 12 | 2 | 0 | 0 | — | | — | | 12 | 2 |
| Career Total | | | 54 | 24 | 4 | 2 | 0 | 0 | 0 | 0 | 58 | 26 |
