= Kyra Dickinson =

St. Kitts and Nevis footballer (born 1993)

Personal information
- Date of birth: 3 January 1993 (age 33)
- Place of birth: Charlemagne, Quebec, Canada
- Height: 1.78 m (5 ft 10 in)
- Position: Goalkeeper

Youth career
- Brampton Brams United
- Master's FA

College career
Years	Team	Apps	(Gls)
2011–2014	Howard Bison	34	(0)

Senior career*
Years	Team	Apps	(Gls)
2017	Töcksfors IF	5	(0)
2021	Master's FA		
2022	ProStars FC	15	(0)

International career^{‡}
	Saint Kitts and Nevis	10+	(0)
- * Club domestic league appearances and goals as of 24 July 2022 ‡ National team caps and goals as of 22 February 2022

Kyra Dickinson (born 3 January 1993) is a footballer who plays as a goalkeeper. Born in Canada, she represents Saint Kitts and Nevis at international level.

== Early life ==
Dickinson played youth soccer with Brampton Brams United and Master's FA.

== College career ==
Dickinson began attending Howard University in 2011, where she played for the women's soccer team. In 2014, she was Howard's Goalkeeper of the Year, and was also named the SWAC Goalkeeper of the Year and named to the SWAC All-Conference Second Team, winning the 2014 SWAC Soccer Tournament Championship.

After graduating from Howard, she pursued a masters degree at the University of British Columbia, where she also played at the amateur level in the Metro Women’s Soccer League Premier Division in Vancouver with the Vancouver United FC Primas.

== Playing career ==
In 2017, she played in Sweden with Töcksfors IF.

In 2021, she played with Master's FA.

In 2022, she joined ProStars FC in League1 Ontario.

== International career ==
Internationally, Dickinson represents St. Kitts and Nevis, serving as vice-captain and later as captain.
