= 2024 League1 Ontario season =

League1 Ontario
- Season: 2024
- Dates: April 26 – September 4
- Champions: Scrosoppi FC (L1O-P); TFC Academy (L1O-C); Alliance United B (L2O)
- L1 Cup champions: Vaughan Azzurri

The 2024 Men's League1 Ontario season is the tenth of League1 Ontario, a Division 3 men's soccer league in the Canadian soccer pyramid and the highest level of soccer based in the Canadian province of Ontario. Starting from this season, the league will split into three divisions with promotion and relegation between them.

The Premier division will be composed of 12 clubs, the Championship division of 10 clubs, all returning from last season. The League2 Ontario will be made up by three conferences containing reserve teams and newly licensed clubs.

== League1 Ontario Premier ==
League1 Ontario Premier
- Season: 2024
- Dates: April 27 – September 4
- Champions: Scrosoppi FC (1st title)
- Relegated: Hamilton United; Guelph United FC
- Matches: 132
- Goals: 441 (3.34 per match)
- Top goalscorer: Reshaun Walkes (18 goals)

League1 Ontario Premier will be composed of 12 teams, all coming back from the 2023 League1 Ontario season. Those clubs have qualified to the Premier division by finishing in the top half of the combined standings of the previous two seasons, with the exception of the Electric City FC, which have folded, being then replaced by the Woodbridge Strikers SC.

The 12 teams will face each other twice, once at home and once away and the club at the top of the standings will be crowned as League1 Ontario champions and gain a berth for the 2025 Canadian Championship. The last placed team will be automatically relegated, while the 11th placed club will play a playoff game against the 2nd placed club of the Championship to stay in the league.

=== Clubs ===
League1 Premier
Team	City	Principal stadium	Head coach
Alliance United FC	Scarborough (Toronto)	Centennial College	Ilya Orlov
Blue Devils FC	Oakville	Sheridan Trafalgar Campus	Duncan Wilde
Burlington SC	Burlington	Corpus Christi	Darren Tilley
Guelph United F.C.	Guelph	Centennial Bowl	Justin Springer
Hamilton United	Hamilton	Ron Joyce Stadium	Kamran Derayeh
North Toronto Nitros	North York (Toronto)	Downsview Park	Marko Milanović
ProStars FC	Brampton	Victoria Park Stadium	Danny Costa
Scrosoppi FC	Milton	St. Francis Xavier	John Yacou
Sigma FC	Mississauga	Paramount Fine Foods Centre / Tim Hortons Field	John Zervos
Simcoe County Rovers FC	Barrie	J.C. Massie Field	Zico Mahrady
Vaughan Azzurri	Vaughan	North Maple Field	Carmine Isacco
Woodbridge Strikers	Woodbridge (Vaughan)	Vaughan Grove Field	Peter Pinizzotto

=== Standings ===
Pos	Team	Pld	W	D	L	GF	GA	GD	Pts	Qualification or relegation
1	Scrosoppi FC (C)	22	16	5	1	54	12	+42	53	Qualification to 2025 Canadian Championship
2	Vaughan Azzurri	22	14	7	1	60	23	+37	49	
3	Woodbridge Strikers SC	22	10	7	5	45	32	+13	37	
4	North Toronto Nitros	22	10	4	8	41	39	+2	34	
5	Simcoe County Rovers FC	22	9	7	6	43	33	+10	34	
6	Alliance United FC	22	8	6	8	33	33	0	30	
7	Blue Devils FC	22	8	6	8	35	41	−6	30	
8	Burlington SC	22	9	2	11	33	42	−9	29	
9	Sigma FC	22	7	4	11	29	41	−12	25	
10	ProStars FC	22	7	3	12	27	41	−14	24	
11	Guelph United F.C. (R)	22	4	4	14	27	44	−17	16	Qualification to relegation playoffs
12	Hamilton United (R)	22	0	5	17	14	60	−46	5	Relegation to League1 Ontario Championship

Source: League1 Ontario
(C) Champions; (R) Relegated

=== Promotion playoffs ===
A playoff will be played between the 11th placed team in the Premier and the 3rd placed team in the Championship in a single game for a place in the top tier in 2025.

September 11, 2024	Guelph United FC (L1O Premier 11th place)	1–1 (1–3 p)	St. Catharines Roma Wolves (L1O Championship 3rd Place)	St. Catharines, Ontario
	Sears 90+5'		Homenszki 17'	Stadium: Club Roma; Referee: Ryan Schwenger
	Shootout
	Yates (penalty missed); Cabral (penalty scored); Agyemang (penalty missed); Borges (penalty missed)		(penalty scored) Salonen; (penalty scored) Lila; (penalty scored) Homenszki
Note: The match was initially scheduled to be held at the Ontario Soccer Centre as a neutral venue. However, as Guelph United requested a match postponement, the match was moved to St. Catharines as a concession.

=== Statistics ===
==== Top goalscorers ====
Rank	Player	Club	Goals
1	(Canada) Reshaun Walkes	Vaughan Azzurri	18
2	(Canada) Ronaldo Marshall	Woodbridge Strikers	16
3	(Canada) Kevaughan Tavernier	Sigma FC	15
4	(Israel) Fadi Salback	North Toronto Nitros	14
5	(Canada) Jevontae Layne	Simcoe County Rovers FC	13
6	(Canada) Tomasz Skublak	Scrosoppi FC	12
7	(Canada) Jacob Carlos	Scrosoppi FC	10
7	(Canada) Jared Agyemang	Guelph United FC	10
9	(Canada) Christopher Campoli	Vaughan Azzurri	9
10	(Canada) Pablo Hempelmann-Perez	Alliance United FC	8
10	(Canada) Mauro Lulli	Burlington SC	8

Source: League1 Ontario

=== League Honours ===
==== Awards ====
Award	Player	Team	Ref
Most Valuable Player	Tomasz Skublak	Scrosoppi FC	
Young Player of the Year (U20)	Kevaughn Tavernier	Sigma FC	
Coach of the Year	John Yacou	Scrosoppi FC	
Goalkeeper of the Year	Lucas Birnstingl	Alliance United FC	
Defender of the Year	Adam Czerkawski	Blue Devils FC	
Midfielder of the Year	Jacob Begley	Vaughan Azzurri	
Forward of the Year	Jevontae Layne	Simcoe County Rovers FC	
Golden Boot (Top Scorer)	Reshaun Walkes	Vaughan Azzurri	

==== League All-Stars ====
The following players were named League1 Ontario Premier Division All-Stars for the 2024 season:

First Team All-Stars

Player	Position
Lucas Birnstingl (Alliance United)	Goalkeeper
Nirun Sivananthan (Alliance United)	Defender
Adam Czerkawski (Blue Devils)	Defender
Mathieu Laurent (Vaughan Azzurri)	Defender
Tristan Marshall (Scrosoppi)	Defender
Jacob Begley (Vaughan Azzurri)	Midfielder
Jacob Carlos (Scrosoppi)	Midfielder
Jacob Spizzirri (Woodbridge Strikers)	Midfielder
Reshaun Walkes (Vaughan Azzurri)	Forward
Tomasz Skublak (Scrosoppi)	Forward
Jevontae Layne (Simcoe County Rovers)	Forward

Second Team All-Stars

Player	Position
Jared Maloney (Scrosoppi)	Goalkeeper
Ibrahim Ahmat (Hamilton United)	Defender
Matthew Chandler (North Toronto Nitros)	Defender
Keegan Wilson (Woodbridge Strikers)	Defender
Matthew Medeiros (Vaughan Azzurri)	Defender
Simon Triantafillou (Burlington)	Midfielder
Raheem Rose (Vaughan Azzurri)	Midfielder
Gray Yates (Guelph United)	Midfielder
Kevaughn Tavernier (Sigma)	Forward
Fadi Salback (North Toronto Nitros)	Forward
Taha Ilyass (ProStars)	Forward

Honourable Mentions

Player	Position
Samuel Diltz (ProStars)	Goalkeeper
Matthew Paiva (Scrosoppi)	Defender
Cameron Da Silva (Simcoe County Rovers)	Defender
Markus Pusztahegyi (Guelph United)	Defender
Tajay Reid (Simcoe County Rovers)	Defender
Atchu Sivananthan (Alliance United)	Midfielder
Pablo Hempelmann-Perez (Alliance Utd)	Midfielder
Javier George (Simcoe County Rovers)	Midfielder
Andres Delascio (Sigma)	Midfielder
Ronaldo Marshall (Woodbridge Strikers)	Forward
Luca Di Marco (North Toronto Nitros)	Forward

== League1 Ontario Championship ==
League1 Ontario Championship
- Season: 2024
- Dates: April 26 – August 24
- Champions: Toronto FC Academy (1st title)
- Promoted: FC London; St. Catharines Roma Wolves
- Relegated: None
- Matches: 90
- Goals: 347 (3.86 per match)
- Top goalscorer: Luc Coulombe (12 goals)

League1 Ontario Championship is composed of ten teams, nine of those returning from the 2023 League1 Ontario season, and one (Toronto FC Academy) which joined this season. The nine returning clubs qualified for the Championship division by finishing in the bottom half of the combined standings of the previous two seasons of League1 Ontario.

The 10 teams will face each other twice, once at home and once away for a total of 18 games. The club at the top of the standings will be crowned as Championship division winners and will be promoted to the 2025 League1 Ontario Premier. The 2nd ranked team in the standings will face the 11th placed team in the Premier division to gain promotion into the top division for the next season. The team last in the standings will face the winner of the League2 Ontario playoffs winner to stay in the league. There will not be direct relegation to League2 Ontario for the 2024 season because the Championship division will expand to 12 teams in 2025.

=== Clubs ===
League1 Championship
Team	City	Principal stadium	Head coach
BVB IA Waterloo	Waterloo	RIM Park	Michael Marcoccia
Darby FC	Whitby	Telus Dome	Hermann Kingue
FC London	London	Tricar Field	Yiannis Tsalatsidis
Master's FA	Scarborough (Toronto)	L'Amoreaux Sports Complex	Giuseppe Mattace Raso
North Mississauga SC	Mississauga	Churchill Meadows (Mattamy Sports Park)	Peyvand Mossavat
Pickering FC	Pickering	Pickering Soccer Centre	Adrian Field
St. Catharines Roma Wolves	St. Catharines	Club Roma – Under Armour Field	Federico Turriziani
Toronto FC Academy	Toronto	BMO Training Ground	Dino Lopez
Unionville Milliken SC	Unionville (Markham)	Ontario Soccer Centre	Patrick Guirguis
Windsor City FC	Windsor	St. Clair College	Valter Cosenza

=== Standings ===
Pos	Team	Pld	W	D	L	GF	GA	GD	Pts	Qualification or relegation
1	Toronto FC Academy (C)	18	14	3	1	66	18	+48	45	Will not return in 2025 (Note: Toronto FC Academy announced they would withdraw from League1 Ontario following the season, hence their promotion fell to the next eligible team)
2	FC London (P)	18	13	2	3	37	23	+14	41	Promotion to League1 Ontario Premier
3	St. Catharines Roma Wolves (P)	18	10	2	6	39	30	+9	32	Qualification to promotion playoffs
4	Unionville Milliken SC	18	9	3	6	37	39	−2	30	
5	Master's FA	18	5	4	9	22	28	−6	19	
6	Windsor City FC	18	5	4	9	30	39	−9	19	
7	North Mississauga SC	18	4	7	7	40	49	−9	19	
8	Darby FC	18	5	2	11	25	45	−20	17	
9	BVB IA Waterloo	18	4	4	10	23	29	−6	16	
10	Pickering FC	18	4	3	11	28	47	−19	15	Qualification to relegation playoffs (Note: Pickering FC was initially relegated as they lost the relegation play-off against Scrosoppi FC B but the latter later opted out of promotion and consequently Pickering FC was readmitted to the Championship division)

Source: League1 Ontario
(C) Champions; (P) Promoted

=== Promotion playoffs ===
The two losing semi-finalists of League2 Ontario faced against each other, with the winner advancing to play against the 10th placed team in the Championship to get promoted to the Championship for the 2025 season. Despite winning the promotion playoffs, Scrosoppi FC B declined promotion, enabling Pickering FC to remain in the Championship.

Qualification; August 16			Final; August 31
			L1OC	Pickering FC	2
L2O	Scrosoppi FC B	3	L2O	Scrosoppi FC B	6
L2O	Sigma FC B	0

August 31, 2024	Pickering FC (L1O Championship 10th place)	2–6	Scrosoppi FC B (L2O Qualifier)	Vaughan, Ontario
	Wehbe 12'; Watkins 75'		Green 2', 40'; James 22'; Rafisamii 28'; Crocco 45+4'; Eyubeh 67'	Stadium: Ontario Soccer Centre; Referee: Nivin Raizada

=== Statistics ===
As of September 4, 2024

==== Top goalscorers ====
Rank	Player	Club	Goals
1	(Canada) Luc Coulombe	North Mississauga SC	12
2	(Nigeria) George Akpabio	Unionville Milliken SC	11
2	(Canada) Gershom Dupuy	Windsor City FC	11
2	(Canada) Ronaldo Homenszki	St. Catharines Roma Wolves	11
5	(Canada) Emile Kisse	Toronto FC Academy	10
6	(Canada) Cameryon Stewart	North Mississauga SC	8
6	(Canada) Myro Zastavnyy	Pickering FC	8
6	(Canada) Ryan Baker	FC London	8
9	(Canada) Bai Essa Coker	FC London	7
9	(Canada) Logan Rieck	BVB IA Waterloo	7
9	(Canada) Michael Lee	Toronto FC Academy	7
9	(Canada) Nigel Buckley	Darby FC	7
9	(Canada) Tyler Yasaka	North Mississauga SC	7

Source: League1 Ontario

=== League Honours ===
==== Awards ====
Award	Player	Team	Ref
Most Valuable Player	Ethan Kang	Toronto FC Academy	
Young Player of the Year (U20)	Ronaldo Homenszki	St. Catharines Roma Wolves	
Coach of the Year	Yiannis Tsalatsidis	FC London	
Goalkeeper of the Year	Luka Palajsa	FC London	
Defender of the Year	Ryan Baker	FC London	
Midfielder of the Year	Ethan Kang	Toronto FC Academy	
Forward of the Year	Gershom Dupuy	Windsor City FC	
Golden Boot (Top Scorer)	Luc Coulombe	North Mississauga SC	

==== League All-Stars ====
The following players were named League1 Ontario Championship Division All-Stars for the 2024 season:

First Team All-Stars

Player	Position
Luka Palajsa (FC London)	Goalkeeper
Ryan Baker (FC London)	Defender
Bradley Heath (FC London)	Defender
Bastian Aguilera (Windsor City)	Defender
DeAndre Branch (Masters FA)	Defender
Dante D'Orio (FC London)	Midfielder
Ethan Kang (TFC Academy)	Midfielder
Logan Rieck (BVB IA Waterloo)	Midfielder
Bai Essa Coker (FC London)	Midfielder
Gershom Dupuy (Windsor City)	Forward
Nigel Buckley (Darby)	Forward

Second Team All-Stars

Player	Position
Simon Grande (St. Catharines Roma)	Goalkeeper
Cedric Ngounou (North Mississauga)	Defender
Albert Malaj (TFC Academy)	Defender
Haji Shee (Unionville Milliken)	Defender
Terrell Spencer (Masters FA)	Defender
Zach Zoellner-Krauss (Darby)	Midfielder
Jonathan Agapito (Windsor City)	Midfielder
Tomas Ribeiro (BVB IA Waterloo)	Midfielder
Myro Zastavnyy (Pickering)	Forward
Luc Coulombe (North Mississauga)	Forward
Ronaldo Homenszki (St. Catharines Roma)	Forward

== League2 Ontario ==
League2 Ontario
- Season: 2024
- Dates: April 29 – August 5
- Champions: Alliance United FC B (1st title)
- Promoted: Sudbury Cyclones; The Borough FC
- Matches: 168
- Goals: 687 (4.09 per match)
- Top goalscorer: Andrew Paolucci (18 goals)

League2 Ontario clubs will be divided in three regional conferences. Those clubs will be either the "B" team of Premier and Championship clubs or newly licensed clubs.

All teams will face each other team in their conference twice, once at home and once away. The winners of the three conferences plus the best 2nd placed team will qualify for the League2 playoffs, made up by two semi-finals and the final. The winner of the playoffs will be crowned as League2 winner and will be automatically promoted to the 2025 League1 Ontario Championship alongside the losing finalist as the Championship division will expand to 12 teams for the next season. The losing semi-finalists will play each other in the promotion playoffs and the winner will finally face the last placed club of the Championship division for the chance to replace it in the 2nd division.

=== Northeast Conference ===
Northeast Conference
Team	City	Principal stadium	Head coach
Alliance United FC B	Scarborough (Toronto) / Unionville (Markham)	Bill Crothers Turf West	Eric Nelson
Darby FC B	Whitby	Telus Dome	Ramin Mohammadi
Master's FA B	Scarborough / North York (Toronto)	Alumni Field	Fabio Roque
Pickering FC B	Pickering	Pickering Soccer Centre	Ravi Dindial
Simcoe County Rovers FC B	Barrie	J.C. Massie Field	Wais Azizi
Sudbury Cyclones	Sudbury	Cambrian College / James Jerome Sports Complex	Giuseppe Politi
Unionville Milliken SC B	Unionville (Markham)	Bill Crothers Turf West	Patrick Guirguis
Vaughan Azzurri B	Vaughan	North Maple Field	Anthony Vadori

Pos	Team	Pld	W	D	L	GF	GA	GD	Pts	Qualification or relegation
1	Vaughan Azzurri B	14	11	1	2	49	18	+31	34	Qualification to promotion playoffs and L2O finals (Note: Vaughan Azzurri B and Alliance United B gained promotion through L2O play-offs but later renounced. League1 Ontario selected Sudbury Cyclones and The Borough FC to get their spots in the Championship division.)
2	Alliance United FC B (C)	14	11	1	2	56	23	+33	34	Qualification to promotion playoffs and L2O finals
3	Sudbury Cyclones (P)	14	10	2	2	42	11	+31	32	Promotion to League1 Ontario Championship
4	Master's FA B	14	6	4	4	32	22	+10	22	
5	Darby FC B	14	5	2	7	28	27	+1	17	
6	Simcoe County Rovers FC B	14	4	1	9	22	39	−17	13	
7	Unionville Milliken SC B	14	2	0	12	17	72	−55	6	
8	Pickering FC B	14	1	1	12	19	53	−34	4	

Source: League1 Ontario
(C) Champions; (P) Promoted

=== Central Conference ===
Central Conference
Team	City	Principal stadium	Head coach
Blue Devils FC 2	Oakville	North Park Turf	Andrew Seuradge
Burlington SC B	Burlington	City View Park Centre	Mark Worton
North Mississauga SC B	Mississauga	Churchill Meadows (Mattamy Sports Park)	Szabi Bozsoky
North Toronto Nitros B	North York (Toronto)	Downsview Park	Marko Milanovic
ProStars FC B	Brampton / Mississauga	Terry Fox Stadium / Mattamy Sports Park	Alex Liguori
Sigma FC B	Mississauga	Paramount Fine Foods Centre	Philip Opassinis
The Borough FC	Scarborough (Toronto)	Birchmount Stadium	Andrew Ornoch
Woodbridge Strikers B	Woodbridge (Vaughan)	Vaughan Grove Field	Fabio Panetta

Pos	Team	Pld	W	D	L	GF	GA	GD	Pts	Qualification or relegation
1	Sigma FC B	14	10	3	1	35	15	+20	33	Qualification to promotion playoffs and L2O finals
2	Woodbridge Strikers B	14	10	0	4	37	26	+11	30	
3	Blue Devils FC B	14	7	3	4	31	21	+10	24	
4	North Toronto Nitros B	14	6	3	5	26	21	+5	21	
5	Burlington SC B	14	4	3	7	29	28	+1	15	
6	The Borough FC (P)	14	4	3	7	20	25	−5	15	Promotion to League1 Ontario Championship (Note: Vaughan Azzurri B and Alliance United B gained promotion through L2O play-offs but later renounced. League1 Ontario selected Sudbury Cyclones and The Borough FC to get their spots in the Championship division.)
7	North Mississauga SC B	14	2	5	7	21	33	−12	11	
8	ProStars FC B	14	2	2	10	13	43	−30	8	

Source: League1 Ontario
(P) Promoted

=== Southwest Conference ===
Southwest Conference
Team	City	Principal stadium	Head coach
BVB IA Waterloo B	Waterloo	RIM Park	Alejandro Plaza-Berry
FC London B	London	City Wide Sports Park	Devin Haigh
Guelph United FC B	Guelph	Eastview	Don Ferguson
Hamilton United B	Ancaster (Hamilton)	Redeemer	Charles Ivanov
Rush Canada SA	Oakville	River Oaks Park / Sheridan Trafalgar Campus	Bogdan Brasoveanu
Scrosoppi FC B	Milton	St. Francis Xavier	John Yacou
St. Catharines Roma Wolves B	St. Catharines	Brock University / Club Roma	Frank De Chellis
Windsor City FC B	Windsor	St. Clair College	Valter Cosenza

Pos	Team	Pld	W	D	L	GF	GA	GD	Pts	Qualification or relegation
1	Scrosoppi FC B	14	13	1	0	63	7	+56	40	Qualification to promotion playoffs and L2O finals (Note: Scrosoppi FC B was initially promoted as they won the promotion play-off against Pickering FC but they later opted out of promotion)
2	Rush Canada SA	14	10	0	4	34	15	+19	30	
3	Guelph United FC B	14	9	2	3	30	17	+13	29	
4	St. Catharines Roma Wolves B	14	6	0	8	26	40	−14	18	
5	BVB IA Waterloo B	14	4	3	7	16	30	−14	15	
6	Hamilton United B	14	4	1	9	17	42	−25	13	
7	FC London B	14	3	1	10	12	26	−14	10	
8	Windsor City FC B	14	2	2	10	12	33	−21	8	

Source: League1 Ontario

=== League2 Ontario Finals ===
Semi-finals; August 9–10
CE1	Scrosoppi FC B	2
NE1	Vaughan Azzurri B	4
WC	Alliance United FC B	6
SW1	Sigma FC B	0

Final; August 17
NE1	Vaughan Azzurri B	2 (8)
WC	Alliance United FC B	2 (9)

=== Statistics ===
As of September 4, 2024

==== Top goalscorers ====
Rank	Player	Club	Goals
1	(Canada) Andrew Paolucci	Scrosoppi FC B	18
2	(Canada) Anthony Morano	Woodbridge Strikers B	15
3	(Canada) Matthew Glavanov	Alliance United FC B	14
4	(Canada) Lorenzo Abbaglivo	Alliance United FC B	13
4	(Canada) Ronell Perdigao	Masters FA B	13
4	(Canada) Timi Aliu	Sudbury Cyclones	13
7	(Canada) Sam Howard	BVB IA Waterloo B	12
8	(Canada) Adrian Panaite	Alliance United FC B	11
8	(Canada) Nathan Baker	Vaughan Azzurri B	11
10	(Canada) Xavier Enakimio	Burlington SC B	9
10	(Canada) Yuki Ibie	Guelph United FC B	9

Source: League1 Ontario

=== League Honours ===
==== Awards ====
Award	Northeast Division	Central Division	Southwest Division	Ref
Most Valuable Player	Adrian Panaite (Alliance United B)	Anthony Morano (Woodbridge Strikers B)	Andrew Paolucci (Scrosoppi B)	
Coach of the Year	Eric Nelson (Alliance United B)	Andrew Ornoch (The Borough)	Manny Corona & Don Ferguson (Scrosoppi B) / (Guelph United B)	
Goalkeeper of the Year	Ahrvin Raveendran (Alliance United B)	David Carano (Woodbridge Strikers B)	Taj Moore (FC London B)	
Defender of the Year	Luke Harrop (Sudbury Cyclones)	Julian Di Lucia (The Borough)	Julian Gonzalez (Scrosoppi B)	
Midfielder of the Year	Francesco Panetta (Vaughan Azzurri B)	Daniel Prieto (Blue Devils B)	Oleksiy Kharko (Scrosoppi B)	
Forward of the Year	Nathan Baker (Vaughan Azzurri B)	Anthony Morano (Woodbridge Strikers B)	Andrew Paolucci (Scrosoppi B)	
Golden Boot (Top Scorer)	Timi Aliu (Sudbury Cyclones)	Anthony Morano (Woodbridge Strikers B)	Andrew Paolucci (Scrosoppi B)	

==== League All-Stars ====
The following players were named League2 Ontario First Team All-Stars for the 2024 season:

Northeast Division

Player	Position
Ahrvin Raveendran (Alliance United B)	Goalkeeper
Jacob Price (Alliance United B)	Defender
Luke Harrop (Sudbury Cyclones)	Defender
Russell Robertson (Darby FC B)	Defender
Mekhi Wright (Vaughan Azzurri B)	Defender
Kaden Bennett (Unionville Milliken B)	Midfielder
Francesco Panetta (Vaughan Azzurri B)	Midfielder
Kira Sindayigawa (Alliance United B)	Midfielder
Skyler Pinnock (Alliance United B)	Midfielder
Nathan Baker (Vaughan Azzurri B)	Forward
Lorenzo Abbaglivo (Alliance United B)	Forward

Central Division

Player	Position
David Carano (Woodbridge Strikers B)	Goalkeeper
Joey Varabatta (ProStars FC B)	Defender
Julian Di Lucia (The Borough)	Defender
Julian Srock (North Mississauga B)	Defender
Christopher Vitantonio (Woodbridge B)	Defender
Daniel Prieto (Blue Devils B)	Midfielder
Zayne Bruno (Sigma B)	Midfielder
Nico Barros (North Toronto Nitros B)	Midfielder
Pratik Tamhankar (The Borough)	Forward
Anthony Morano (Woodbridge Strikers B)	Forward
Kenan Hodzic (Sigma B)	Forward

Southwest Division

Player	Position
Taj Moore (FC London B)	Goalkeeper
Jace Foster (Scrosoppi B)	Defender
Julian Gonzalez (Scrosoppi B)	Defender
Alessandro Muza (St. Catharines Roma)	Defender
Michael Pais (Rush Canada)	Defender
Oleksiy Kharko (Scrosoppi B)	Midfielder
Lucas Medeiros (Scrosoppi B)	Midfielder
Alp Arikan (Rush Canada)	Midfielder
Juan Manuel Plata Cruz (Hamilton Utd B)	Midfielder
Andrew Paolucci (Scrosoppi B)	Forward
Sam Howard (BVB IA Waterloo B)	Forward

The following players were named League2 Ontario Second Team All-Stars for the 2024 season:

Northeast Division

Player	Position
Josh Bondoc (Sudbury Cyclones)	Goalkeeper
Kalen Adonu (Darby B)	Defender
Coltrane Abrams (Unionville Milliken B)	Defender
Kalvin Alphonsus (Alliance United B)	Defender
Alexander Martins (Masters FA B)	Defender
Lamin Trawally (Masters FA B)	Midfielder
Adam Belquas (Unionville Milliken B)	Midfielder
Warren Chambers (Pickering B)	Midfielder
Ronell Perdigão (Masters FA B)	Forward
Timi Aliu (Sudbury Cyclones)	Forward
Diego Herrera (Simcoe County Rovers B)	Forward

Central Division

Player	Position
Sebastian Farias (Blue Devils B)	Goalkeeper
Ronaldo Hylton (Blue Devils B)	Defender
Ricardo Gonzalez (North Toronto Nitros B)	Defender
Matea Kovacevic (Sigma B)	Defender
Joshua Miller (Sigma B)	Defender
Karl Espiro (Burlington B)	Midfielder
Matthew Rogers (Burlington B)	Midfielder
Pietro Arrigoni (North Mississauga B)	Midfielder
Anthony Khananisho (Woodbridge B)	Forward
Ethan De Sousa-Swan (North Miss. B)	Forward
Cristian Alfieri (ProStars B)	Forward

Southwest Division

Player	Position
Thomas Mauro (Scrosoppi B)	Goalkeeper
Ajmal Tesilimi (Scrosoppi B)	Defender
Stone Campbell (Windsor City B)	Defender
Aiden Bertoli (BVB IA Waterloo B)	Defender
Cameron Clack (Guelph United B)	Defender
Oliver Barta (Rush Canada)	Midfielder
Zachary Thomas (Windsor City B)	Midfielder
Cameron Smyth (FC London B)	Midfielder
Gabriel Plaza Berry (BVB IA Waterloo B)	Midfielder
Yuki Ibie (Guelph United B)	Forward
Harky Sahota (Rush Canada)	Forward

== L1 Cup ==
The L1 Cup is a league cup tournament that was contested by teams from all three tiers of League1 Ontario. The Cup returned after a five season hiatus, having last been played in 2018.

All 25 "A" teams participated in the five-round knockout competition, which was played concurrently with the league season. Eighteen clubs entered the first round (five clubs from the Premier Division, all ten clubs from the Championship division, and the three A teams from League2), while seven clubs from the Premier Division received a bye to the round of 16.

=== Bracket ===
- First Round
- April 19–22

- Round of 16
- May 14 – June 12

- Quarterfinals
- May 28 – July 31

- Semifinals
- August 27– 28

- Final
- September 6

L1OP
Alliance United FC
0

L1OC
Master's FA
1

L1OP
ProStars FC
1

L1OC
Master's FA
4

L1OC
Master's FA
1

L1OP
North Toronto Nitros
2

L1OP
North Toronto Nitros
3

L1OC
Toronto FC Academy
0

L1OP
North Toronto Nitros
1(4)

L1OP
Woodbridge Strikers
1(3)

L1OP
Woodbridge Strikers
4

L1OC
Unionville Milliken SC
1

L1OP
North Toronto Nitros
0

L1OP
Vaughan Azzurri
2

L1OP
Sigma FC
5

L1OC
BVB IA Waterloo
0

L1OC
Windsor City FC
1

L1OC
BVB IA Waterloo
2

L1OP
Sigma FC
1

L1OP
Vaughan Azzurri
4

L1OP
Vaughan Azzurri
4

L1OC
St. Catharines Roma Wolves
1

L1OC
St. Catharines Roma Wolves
3

L1OC
North Mississauga SC
2

L1OP
Vaughan Azzurri
1(3)

L1OP
Simcoe County Rovers
1(1)

L1OP
Blue Devils FC
2(4)

L1OC
FC London
2(3)

L2O
Sudbury Cyclones
0

L1OC
FC London
1

L1OP
Blue Devils FC
3

L1OP
Burlington SC
1

L1OP
Scrosoppi FC
1(2)

L1OP
Burlington SC
1(4)

L1OP
Burlington SC
2

L2O
Rush Canada SA
0

L1OP
Blue Devils FC
0

L1OP
Simcoe County Rovers
3

L1OP
Guelph United FC
3

L2O
The Borough FC
0

L2O
The Borough FC
2

L1OC
Pickering FC
1

L1OP
Guelph United FC
1

L1OP
Simcoe County Rovers
2

L1OP
Simcoe County Rovers
2

L1OC
Darby FC
0

L1OP
Hamilton United
1

L1OC
Darby FC
3

== U20 Reserve Division ==
The league will continue to operate a reserve division (however, unlike previous years where there were both U19 and U21 divisions, there will be a single U20 division). The reserve division will be split into regional conferences. It is not part of the regular pyramid and teams are not eligible for promotion.

=== Summer Division ===
==== Northeast Division ====
Pos	Team	Pld	W	D	L	GF	GA	GD	Pts	
1	Vaughan Azzurri U20 (C)	13	10	3	0	40	9	+31	33	Qualification to playoffs
2	North Toronto Nitros U20	13	10	2	1	33	15	+18	32	Qualification to playoffs
3	Alliance United FC U20	13	9	2	2	38	13	+25	29	
4	Richmond Hill SC U20	13	8	2	3	32	12	+20	26	
5	The Borough FC U20	13	6	2	5	27	21	+6	20	
6	Sigma FC U20	13	6	2	5	22	19	+3	20	
7	ProStars FC U20	13	5	4	4	34	24	+10	19	
8	Master's FA U20	13	5	1	7	15	27	−12	16	
9	Simcoe County Rovers FC U20	13	4	3	6	23	38	−15	15	
10	Darby FC U20	13	3	2	8	20	32	−12	11	
11	Aurora FC U20	13	2	5	6	21	29	−8	11	
12	Scarborough Town FC U20	13	3	1	9	9	32	−23	10	
13	Unionville Milliken SC U20	13	1	3	9	26	45	−19	6	
14	Woodbridge Strikers U20 East	13	0	6	7	11	35	−24	6	

Source: League1 Ontario
(C) Champions

==== Southwest Division ====
Pos	Team	Pld	W	D	L	GF	GA	GD	Pts	
1	Whitecaps London SC U20	13	9	4	0	35	12	+23	31	Qualification to playoffs
2	North Mississauga U20	13	9	2	2	37	12	+25	29	Qualification to playoffs
3	Woodbridge Strikers U20 West	13	8	3	2	36	14	+22	27	
4	Blue Devils FC U20	13	8	3	2	35	20	+15	27	
5	Cambridge United U20	13	7	3	3	32	15	+17	24	
6	Scrosoppi FC U20	13	6	3	4	24	14	+10	21	
7	Guelph United FC U20	13	5	2	6	26	25	+1	17	
8	FC London U20	13	5	2	6	21	30	−9	17	
9	Burlington SC U20	13	4	2	7	28	34	−6	14	
10	Windsor City FC U20	13	4	2	7	21	27	−6	14	
11	Hamilton United U20	13	4	1	8	25	39	−14	13	
12	Rush Canada SA U20	13	2	4	7	14	23	−9	10	
13	St. Catharines Roma Wolves U20	13	2	4	7	16	31	−15	10	
14	Brampton SC U20	13	0	1	12	7	61	−54	1	

Source: League1 Ontario

==== Playoffs ====
Semifinals; July 31
NE1	Vaughan Azzurri U20	2
SW2	North Mississauga SC U20	1
SW1	Whitecaps London SC U20	1(4)
NE2	North Toronto Nitros U20	1(5)

Championship Game; August 3
NE1	Vaughan Azzurri U20	4
NE2	North Toronto Nitros U20	0

=== Fall Division ===
==== Northeast Division ====
Pos	Team	Pld	W	D	L	GF	GA	GD	Pts	
1	Vaughan Azzurri U20 (C)	10	8	1	1	37	9	+28	25	Qualification to playoffs
2	Sigma FC U20	10	8	0	2	33	14	+19	24	Qualification to playoffs
3	Woodbridge Strikers U20	10	7	2	1	24	13	+11	23	
4	North Toronto Nitros U20	10	4	2	4	20	18	+2	14	
5	The Borough FC U20	10	4	1	5	13	26	−13	13	
6	Alliance United FC U20	10	3	1	6	23	37	−14	10	
7	Master's FA U20	10	1	1	8	7	29	−22	4	
8	Richmond Hill SC U20	10	1	0	9	9	25	−16	3	

Source: League1 Ontario
(C) Champions

==== Southwest Division ====
Pos	Team	Pld	W	D	L	GF	GA	GD	Pts	
1	Blue Devils FC U20	10	9	1	0	33	8	+25	28	Qualification to playoffs
2	North Mississauga U20	10	5	3	2	19	13	+6	18	Qualification to playoffs
3	Scrosoppi FC U20	10	4	3	3	17	14	+3	15	
4	Guelph United FC U20	10	4	2	4	24	21	+3	14	
5	ProStars FC U20	10	3	2	5	22	22	0	11	
6	Rush Canada SA U20	10	1	6	3	18	24	−6	9	
7	Unionville Milliken SC U20	10	2	2	6	29	28	+1	8	
8	Burlington SC U20	10	2	1	7	12	39	−27	7	

Updated to match(es) played on November 1, 2024. Source: League1 Ontario

==== Playoffs ====
Semifinals; November 11–12
NE1	Vaughan Azzurri U20	2(5)
SW2	North Mississauga SC U20	2(4)
SW1	Blue Devils FC U20	0
NE2	Sigma FC U20	1

Championship Game; November 15
NE1	Vaughan Azzurri U20	2
NE2	Sigma FC U20	1
