= Svyatik Artemenko =

Ukrainian footballer (born 2000)

Personal information
- Full name: Svyatoslav Artemenko
- Date of birth: 11 February 2000 (age 26)
- Place of birth: Odesa, Ukraine
- Height: 1.88 m (6 ft 2 in)
- Position: Goalkeeper

Youth career
- Bonivital SC

College career
Years	Team	Apps	(Gls)
2021	Guelph Gryphons	15	(0)
2023–2024	Thompson Rivers WolfPack	12	(0)

Senior career*
Years	Team	Apps	(Gls)
2019	WSA Winnipeg	14	(0)
2019	→ Valour FC (loan)	0	(0)
2021–2022	Guelph United FC	25	(0)
2022	→ York United (loan)	0	(0)
2022	FC Berlin	7	(0)
2023	Electric City FC	18	(0)
2024	Rivers FC	2	(0)
2024	→ Valour FC (loan)	0	(0)
- * Club domestic league appearances and goals as of May 20, 2024

Svyatik Artemenko (born 11 February 2000) is a Ukrainian footballer.

== Early life ==
Artemenko was born in Odesa, Ukraine. At the age of two, he moved with his family to Winnipeg, Canada. He played youth soccer with Bonivital SC and represented Manitoba at the 2017 Canada Summer Games.

== University career ==
In 2021, he began attending University of Guelph, where he played for the men's soccer team. He was named the team Rookie of the Year in 2021. He helped the team win the OUA Championship and was named the OUA goalkeeper of the year and to the U SPORTS National Championship All-Tournament team.

In 2023, he began attending Thompson Rivers University, where he played for the men's soccer team.

== Club career ==
In 2019, he played with WSA Winnipeg in USL League Two. Also in 2019, he signed with Valour FC of the Canadian Premier League as an emergency backup goalkeeper, but did not appear in any matches. He attended training camp the following years with Valour, but did not earn a contract.

In 2021, he joined Guelph United F.C. in League1 Ontario. He was named a West Division All-Star and West Division Top Goalkeeper. In the playoff semi-final, Artemenko scored the winning penalty kick, before making the winning save in a penalty shootout against Master's FA to advance to the next round, where Guelph won the championship defeating Blue Devils FC.

In early 2022, he went to Ukraine to trial to earn a professional contract with FC Podillya in the second tier Ukrainian First League, earning a contract on 23 February. However, the next day, Russia invaded Ukraine suspending all soccer activities in the country and Artemenko registered for the Ukrainian army.

On 5 May 2022, following his military service in Ukraine, he returned to Guelph United to re-join them for their 2022 season. He made his return in a Canadian Championship match against Canadian Premier League club HFX Wanderers FC. In August 2022, he joined Canadian Premier League side York United FC as an emergency goalkeeper substitute for a few matches following an injury to Niko Giantsopoulos.

In August 2022, he joined FC Berlin of the United Premier Soccer League ahead of the 2022 UPSL Fall season.

In March 2023, he joined Electric City FC in League1 Ontario.

In 2024, he began playing with Rivers FC in League1 British Columbia. In May 2024, he joined Valour FC on a short-term replacement player contract, following an injury to their starting goalkeeper.

== Military career ==
Between the ages of 16 and 18, Artemenko trained as a combat engineer with the Canadian Reserve Forces in Winnipeg.

In February 2022, Artemenko, who was in Ukraine pursuing a professional soccer career, enlisted with the Armed Forces of Ukraine following the 2022 Russian invasion of Ukraine. While he was not required to enlist in the army as he was a Canadian citizen, he felt it was his duty to protect his ancestral homeland. He was initially not allowed to join due to not being a Ukrainian citizen, however, the next day his application was approved as part of an International Legion. His club team, Guelph United hosted a fundraiser to raise funds for the Ukrainian Red Cross in support of Artemenko's cause. He returned to Canada in early May, following a two-month tour of duty. In April 2024, Canadian sports broadcasting channel TSN filmed a documentary focusing on Artemenko and his experience.

== Career statistics ==
As of 19 August 2023

Club statistics
Club	Season	League			Playoffs		National Cup (Note: Includes appearances in the Canadian Championship.)		Continental		Total	
Club	Season	Division	Apps	Goals	Apps	Goals	Apps	Goals	Apps	Goals	Apps	Goals
WSA Winnipeg	2019	USL League Two	14	0	—		—		—		14	0
Valour FC (loan)	2019	Canadian Premier League	0	0	—		0	0	—		0	0
Guelph United FC	2021	League1 Ontario	13	0	2	0	—		—		15	0
Guelph United FC	2022	League1 Ontario	13	0	—		1	0	—		14	0
Guelph United FC	Total		26	0	2	0	1	0	0	0	29	0
York United FC (loan)	2022	Canadian Premier League	0	0	—		0	0	—		0	0
FC Berlin	2022	United Premier Soccer League	7	0	—		—		—		7	0
Electric City FC	2023	League1 Ontario	18	0	—		—		—		18	0
Career total			65	0	2	0	1	0	0	0	68	0
