= Sherwin Emmanuel =

Saint Lucian footballer (born 1986)

Personal information
- Full name: Sherwin Emmanuel
- Date of birth: 11 April 1986 (age 40)
- Place of birth: Scarborough, Ontario, Canada
- Height: 1.81 m (5 ft 11 in)
- Positions: Midfielder; center back

Team information
- Current team: Sporting Kristina

Youth career
- North York Hearts
- 2010: Csákvár

Senior career*
Years	Team	Apps	(Gls)
2010	Portugal FC		
2011–2012	Mississauga Eagles FC		
2012–2013	Southern Samity		
2013–2014	Adelaide Cobras FC	25	(5)
2014	Adelaide Raiders SC	18	(1)
2015	Para Hills Knights SC	24	(5)
2016	Master's FA	21	(1)
2016–2018	Råslätts SK		
2019	Adelaide Cobras FC	9	(1)
2021–	Sporting Kristina	5	(0)

International career^{‡}
2019–	Saint Lucia	2	(0)
- * Club domestic league appearances and goals as of 12:54, 17 July 2017 (UTC) ‡ National team caps and goals as of 10:09, 17 July 2017 (UTC)

Sherwin Emmanuel (born 11 April 1986) is a Canadian-born, Saint Lucian international footballer who plays as a center back for Sporting Kristina, in the Kolmonen Finnish league.

== Personal life ==
Emmanuel was born on 11 April 1986 in Scarborough, Toronto, Canada. His parents, Eustace and Lidwina Emmanuel both were from Saint Lucia. At the age of 12, he got selected to try out for the U-14 Ontario provincial team.

== Early playing career ==
He began his football career at the U-14 Ontario provincial (east district) team. Although he didn't make that squad, he was determined to make it the following year through intense training and a determined spirit. The following months he got selected to play for a district team that played in a tournament against other districts.

To be selected for the under 13 Ontario provincial team, which he made and was honored to represent. This team played in provincial tournaments as well as tournaments in Germany where they faced Bundesliga teams like U-15 FC Schalke 04 and VFB Stuttgart for example.

During his days in Canada under-17 soccer team, Sherwin had the opportunity to play against many teams including USA, El Salvador, Guatemala, Mexico, Bermuda, Barbados, and Jamaica to name a few.

== Club career ==
Emmanuel began playing at the youth level in 2010 with Csákvár FC, and later with Erin Mills SC. He later played in the Canadian Soccer League originally with Portugal FC (which is currently renamed as SC Toronto) in 2010, and the following season with the Mississauga Eagles FC.

In 2012, he played abroad in India with Kolkata-based club Southern Samity, that competed in the I-League 2nd Division. The following season he played in the National Premier Leagues South Australia with Adelaide Cobras FC. He would later spend time with Adelaide Raiders SC, and with Para Hills Knights SC.

In 2016, he moved to the League1 Ontario with Master's FA, where logged 1,706 minutes over 21 appearances, scoring one goal.

In 2017, he signed with the Swedish Division 3 side Råslätts SK and spent two seasons. In 2018, he returned to Australia to play with Adelaide Cobras. With Cobras, he appeared in nine league matches, scoring one goal.

In 2021, he played in the Finland’s Kolmonen league, for Sporting Kristina. He signed for the last 5 games, which he played every game and helped them escape relegation.

== International career ==
In 2001, he was selected for the Canada men's national under-15 soccer team camp, and later was called by head coach Stephen Hart for the Canada men's national under-17 soccer team camp in 2002, and 2003.

Emmanuel was among 22 players, named to the squad for the 2019–20 CONCACAF Nations League B matches against Dominican Republic and Montserrat on 16 and 19 November 2019. He made his senior international debut for the Saint Lucia national football team on October 12, 2019, against the Dominican Republic in a 2019–20 CONCACAF Nations League B match, which ended as their 3–0 loss.

== Managerial career ==
In 2019, he became involved with Sole Soccer Camp as a trainer. He also serves as an academy coach for Dutch Connections FC Under 10 soccer program alongside the U11 team.

== See also ==
- Saint Lucia international footballers
