= 2021 League1 Ontario season =

League1 Ontario Men's Division
- Season: 2021
- Dates: July 29 – November 7, 2021
- Champions: Guelph United F.C.
- Regular Season Champions: Vaughan Azzurri
- Matches: 90
- Goals: 374 (4.16 per match)
- Top goalscorer: Jace Kotsopoulos (15)
- Best goalkeeper: Christian Calabro (1.03 GAA)

The 2021 Men's League1 Ontario season was the seventh season of play (the 2020 season was cancelled due to the COVID-19 pandemic) for League1 Ontario, a Division 3 men's soccer league in the Canadian soccer pyramid and the highest level of soccer based in the Canadian province of Ontario.

== Impact of COVID-19 ==
After the 2020 League1 Ontario season was cancelled, due to the COVID-19 pandemic, the league was optimistic that the 2021 season would be able to proceed. The league initially announced a projected start date of July 2, 2021, also announcing a 'drop-dead date' of June 7, 2021 that will confirm the start of the season on that date depending on restrictions in the province, otherwise the season would be cancelled. In mid-June, the league start date was later revised to July 29, 2021, in accordance with the local re-opening plans.

== Format ==
The league was divided into two divisions with the East Division having seven teams and the West division having eight teams. Each team played 12 games against teams in their own divisions (East played each opponent home and away, while West played five of the teams twice, and the remaining two teams once). The top two teams from each division advanced to the playoff semi-finals, with the winner of the championship final in November qualifying for the 2022 Canadian Championship.

Because the season began three months later than normal and with very short notice, some clubs have opted to delay their return to Premier Division competition until the 2022 season. As a large portion of the L1O player pool consisted of university and college student athletes, some sides would have limited squads after Labour Day. To combat these challenges, the league created a short-season ‘Summer Championship Series’ for 2021, which will conclude by Labour Day.

In addition, the Reserve Division will return, following a similar format to the Premier Division, featuring 21 teams in three division playing 12 matches, with the top teams advancing to the playoffs and featuring Championship Finals weekend on November 6-7.

== Clubs ==
The men's division consists of 21 teams, an increase from 17 teams in 2020. 1812 FC Barrie, Guelph United F.C., Scrosoppi FC, St. Catharines Roma Wolves, and Waterloo United are new entries, while Aurora FC will not be returning. Hamilton United, who joined in 2020, will also be debuting after their inaugural season was cancelled due to the pandemic. However, some teams opted out of the main division due to the delayed start, resulting in only 15 teams participating. Some of these clubs will still operate teams in the short-season Summer Championship or full length Reserve Division.

The following clubs are set to participate in the league.

Team	City	Principal stadium	Main Division	Summer Championship	Reserve Division
1812 FC Barrie	Barrie / Brampton (Note: 1812 FC Barrie was originally set to play in Barrie; however, due to the COVID-19 pandemic, they played in Brampton due to their expected stadium in Barrie being closed due to COVID-19)	Terry Fox Stadium (Brampton)	Participating	Did not enter	Withdrew
Alliance United FC	Toronto	Mount Joy	Withdrew	Participating	Participating
Blue Devils FC	Oakville	Bronte Park	Participating	Participating	Participating
Darby FC	Whitby	Whitby Soccer Centre	Participating	Did not enter	Participating
Guelph United F.C.	Guelph	Alumni Stadium	Participating	Did not enter	Participating
Hamilton United	Hamilton	Redeemer Sports Complex	Withdrew	Did not enter	Participating
FC London	London	Hellenic Community Centre	Participating	Did not enter	Participating
Master's Futbol	Toronto	L'Amoreaux Park	Participating	Did not enter	Participating (2 teams)
North Mississauga SC	Mississauga	Paramount Fine Foods Centre	Participating	Did not enter	Participating
North Toronto Nitros	Toronto	Downsview Turf 1	Participating	Did not enter	Withdrew
Pickering FC	Pickering	Kinsmen Park	Withdrew	Did not enter	Withdrew
ProStars FC	Brampton	Victoria Park Stadium	Participating	Participating	Participating
Scrosoppi FC	Milton	Bishop Reding Catholic Secondary School	Participating	Did not enter	Withdrew
Sigma FC	Mississauga	Paramount Fine Foods Centre	Participating	Did not enter	Participating
St. Catharines Roma Wolves	St. Catharines	Club Roma Stadium	Withdrew	Participating	Participating
Toronto Skillz FC	Toronto	Birchmount Stadium	Withdrew	Participating	Withdrew
Unionville Milliken SC	Markham	Bill Crothers Turf	Participating	Did not enter	Participating (2 teams)
Vaughan Azzurri	Vaughan	North Maple Regional Park	Participating	Participating	Participating
Waterloo United	Waterloo	RIM Park	Withdrew	Participating	Withdrew
Windsor TFC	Windsor	Libro Centre	Participating	Did not enter	Withdrew
Woodbridge Strikers	Vaughan	Vaughan Grove	Participating	Did not enter	Participating

The following clubs, while not formally part of League1 Ontario are operating teams in the Summer Championship or Reserve Divisions:

Team	City	Principal stadium	Main Division	Summer Championship	Reserve Division
Tecumseh SC	Tecumseh	University of Windsor Stadium	—N/a	Participating	Participating
Athlete Institute	Orangeville	The Hill Academy	—N/a	—N/a	Participating
Toronto FC III (U19)	Toronto	BMO Training Ground	—N/a	Participating	—N/a
Toronto FC IV (U17)	Toronto	BMO Training Ground	—N/a	Participating	—N/a
Whitecaps London	London	North London Stadium	—N/a	Participating	—N/a
FC Durham Academy	Oshawa	Vaso Field	—N/a	—N/a	Participating
Richmond Hill SC	Richmond Hill	Richmond Green	—N/a	—N/a	Participating
Rush Canada Academy	Oakville	Bronte Athletic Park	—N/a	—N/a	Participating

== Premier Division ==
=== East Division ===
Pos	Team	Pld	W	D	L	GF	GA	GD	Pts	Qualification
1	Vaughan Azzurri	12	11	1	0	41	11	+30	34	Advance to playoffs
2	Master's Futbol	12	6	3	3	28	22	+6	21	Advance to playoffs
3	Woodbridge Strikers	12	6	1	5	27	23	+4	19	
4	Unionville Milliken SC	12	5	2	5	19	22	−3	17	
5	1812 FC Barrie	12	4	1	7	25	32	−7	13	
6	Darby FC	12	3	3	6	19	26	−7	12	
7	North Toronto Nitros	12	1	1	10	16	39	−23	4	

Source: Standings

=== West Division ===
Pos	Team	Pld	W	D	L	GF	GA	GD	Pts	Qualification
1	Guelph United FC (O)	12	10	0	2	42	15	+27	30	Advance to playoffs
2	Blue Devils FC	12	9	2	1	29	13	+16	29	Advance to playoffs
3	FC London	12	8	0	4	30	20	+10	24	
4	Scrosoppi FC	12	6	1	5	34	22	+12	19	
5	Sigma FC	12	4	3	5	24	32	−8	15	
6	ProStars FC	12	4	2	6	22	31	−9	14	
7	North Mississauga SC	12	1	2	9	10	32	−22	5	
8	Windsor TFC	12	0	2	10	8	34	−26	2	

Updated to match(es) played on compete. Source: Standings
(O) Play-off winners

=== Playoffs ===
Semifinals
W1	Guelph United FC	2 (9)
E2	Master's Futbol	2 (8)
E1	Vaughan Azzurri	1
W2	Blue Devils FC	2

Championship Game
W1	Guelph United FC	3
W2	Blue Devils FC	1

Semifinals

October 30, 2021	Guelph United FC	2–2 (9–8 p)	Master's FA	Guelph, Ontario
5:00 PM	Doros 25'; Kotsopoulos 70'	Report	Phillip 43', 45'	Stadium: Alumni Stadium; Referee: Filip Dujic
	Penalties
	Doros (penalty scored); Skublak (penalty scored); Kotsopoulos (penalty scored); Steriotis (penalty missed); Sears (penalty scored); Walker (penalty scored); Vidovich (penalty scored); Marchant (penalty scored); Dick (penalty missed); Oakley (penalty scored); Artemenko (penalty scored)		Agard (penalty scored); Wishart (penalty scored); Phillip (penalty scored); Shahwan (penalty scored); Dabire (penalty missed); Spencer (penalty scored); Cortez (penalty scored); Nikolic (penalty scored); Wright (penalty missed); Meikle (penalty scored); Koskinas (penalty missed)

October 31, 2021	Vaughan Azzurri	1–2	Blue Devils FC	Vaughan, Ontario
2:00 PM	Carreiro 73'	Report	Allen 14', 26'	Stadium: North Maple Regional Park; Referee: Hassane Rifai

Final

November 7, 2021	Guelph United FC	3–1	Blue Devils FC	Vaughan, Ontario
4:00 PM	Kotsopoulous 19', 80' (pen.); Skublak 26'	Report	Allen 90+4'	Stadium: Ontario Soccer Centre; Referee: Scott Bowman

=== Statistics ===
==== Top goalscorers ====
Rank	Player	Club	Goals
1	Jace Kotsopoulos	Guelph United	15
2	Ethan Gopaul	FC London	11
2	Reshon Phillip	Master's FA	11
4	Tomasz Skublak	Guelph United	10
5	Johnson Amoo	1812 FC Barrie	8
5	Kadiebue Kadiebue	Woodbridge Strikers	8
5	Alexander Zis	Guelph United	8
8	Leaford Allen	Blue Devils FC	7
8	Jevontae Layne	ProStars FC	7
8	Raheem Rose	Vaughan Azzurri	7
8	Jason Squeo	Sigma FC	7

Updated to matches played on October 28, 2021. Source:

==== Top goalkeepers ====
Rank	Player	Club	Minutes	GAA
1	Christian Calabro	Vaughan Azzurri	788	1.03
2	Lucas Birnstingl	Blue Devils FC	810	1.22
3	Svyatik Artemenko	Guelph United	1080	1.25
4	Spiridon Koskinas	Master's FA	636	1.27
5	Alexander Pothemont	Woodbridge Strikers	810	1.33

Updated to matches played on October 28, 2021. Minimum 450 minutes played. Source:

=== Honours ===
The following awards and nominations were awarded for the 2021 season.

==== Awards ====
East Division

Award	Player	Team
Most Valuable Player	(Canada) Reshon Phillip	Master's FA
Coach of the Year	(Canada) Patrice Gheisar	Vaughan Azzurri
Top Goalkeeper	(Guyana) Quillan Roberts	1812 FC Barrie
Top Defender	(Canada) Terrell Spencer	Master's FA
Top Midfielder	(Canada) Francis Ameyaw	Master's FA

West Division

Award	Player	Team
Most Valuable Player	(Canada) Jace Kotsopoulos	Guelph United F.C.
Coach of the Year	(Canada) Keith Mason & Justin Springer	Guelph United F.C.
Top Goalkeeper	(Canada) Svyatoslav Artemenko	Guelph United F.C.
Top Defender	(Canada) Amardo Oakley	Guelph United F.C.
Top Midfielder	(Canada) Alex Zis	Guelph United F.C.

==== League All-Stars ====
East Division

Player	Position
(Guyana) Quillan Roberts (1812 FC Barrie)	Goalkeeper
(Canada) Terrell Spencer (Master's FA)	Defender
(Canada) Reggie Laryea (Vaughan Azzurri)	Defender
(Canada) Keegan Wilson (Woodbridge Strikers)	Defender
(Canada) Jarred Phillips (Vaughan Azzurri)	Defender
(Canada) Francis Ameyaw (Master's FA)	Midfielder
(Canada) Raheem Rose (Vaughan Azzurri)	Midfielder
(Canada) Dante Pavan (Woodbridge Strikers)	Midfielder
(Canada) Ali El-Zeir (1812 FC Barrie)	Forward
(Canada) Reshon Phillip (Master's FA)	Forward
(Guyana) Shaquille Agard (Master's FA)	Forward

West Division

Player	Position
(Canada) Svyatoslav Artemenko (Guelph United FC)	Goalkeeper
(Canada) Amardo Oakley (Guelph United FC)	Defender
(Canada) Adam Czerkawski (Blue Devils FC)	Defender
(Canada) Bradley Heath (FC London)	Defender
(Canada) Kyle Walton (Sigma FC)	Defender
(Canada) Brandon Duarte (Blue Devils FC)	Midfielder
(Canada) Alex Zis (Guelph United FC)	Midfielder
(Canada) Dion Stergiotis (Guelph United FC)	Midfielder
(Canada) Jace Kotsopoulos (Guelph United FC)	Forward
(Canada) Tomasz Skublak (Guelph United FC)	Forward
(Canada) Ethan Gopaul (FC London)	Forward

== Summer Championship Division ==
Due to the delayed start to the season, some teams were unable to commit to the full season for the Premier Division. For 2021, a short season "Summer Championship" (also called the 'University' Division) was created which will conclude by Labour Day and will include some of the teams that could not participate in the full season.

Pos	Team	Pld	W	D	L	GF	GA	GD	Pts
1	Toronto FC III (U19)	7	4	2	1	13	7	+6	14
2	Toronto FC IV (U17)	6	4	1	1	15	9	+6	13
3	Alliance United FC	7	3	2	2	13	8	+5	11
4	ProStars FC B	7	3	2	2	19	15	+4	11
5	Waterloo United	7	2	5	0	9	5	+4	11
6	St. Catharines Roma Wolves	7	3	1	3	15	10	+5	10
7	Tecumseh SC	7	2	4	1	10	11	−1	10
8	Vaughan Azzurri B	7	2	1	4	9	11	−2	7
9	Whitecaps London	7	2	1	4	8	16	−8	7
10	Toronto Skillz FC	7	1	2	4	8	16	−8	5
11	Blue Devils FC B	7	1	1	5	6	17	−11	4

Source: Standings

== Reserve Division ==
=== East Division ===
Pos	Team	Pld	W	D	L	GF	GA	GD	Pts	Qualification
1	Woodbridge Strikers B	12	9	3	0	25	5	+20	30	Advance to playoffs
2	Vaughan Azzurri C (O)	12	9	2	1	45	12	+33	29	Advance to playoffs
3	Unionville Milliken SC B	12	6	1	5	39	22	+17	19	
4	Richmond Hill SC	12	3	4	5	17	19	−2	13	
5	FC Durham	12	3	3	6	13	39	−26	12	
6	Master's FA B	12	2	3	7	15	32	−17	9	
7	Alliance United FC B	12	0	4	8	9	34	−25	4	

Source: Standings
(O) Play-off winners

=== Central Division ===
Pos	Team	Pld	W	D	L	GF	GA	GD	Pts	Qualification
1	Athlete Institute	12	9	3	0	42	12	+30	30	Advance to playoffs
2	Sigma FC B	12	9	0	3	38	17	+21	27	
3	Unionville Milliken C	12	5	2	5	26	31	−5	17	
4	Darby FC B	12	4	2	6	21	29	−8	14	
5	Master's FA C	12	4	2	6	21	33	−12	14	
6	Blue Devils FC C	12	2	3	7	18	31	−13	9	
7	North Mississauga SC B	12	2	2	8	17	30	−13	8	

Source: Standings

=== West Division ===
Pos	Team	Pld	W	D	L	GF	GA	GD	Pts	Qualification
1	FC London B	12	8	2	2	25	15	+10	26	Advance to playoffs
2	Guelph United FC B	12	7	4	1	32	8	+24	25	
3	Hamilton United	12	6	2	4	13	13	0	20	
4	Rush Canada Academy	12	5	2	5	22	20	+2	17	
5	St. Catharines Roma Wolves B	12	3	5	4	15	16	−1	14	
6	ProStars FC C	12	2	2	8	14	31	−17	8	
7	Tecumseh SC B	12	1	3	8	14	32	−18	6	

Source: Standings

=== Playoffs ===
Semifinals
E1	Woodbridge Strikers B	0
W1	FC London B	2
C1	Athlete Institute	1
WC	Vaughan Azzurri C	4

Championship Game
W1	FC London B	0
WC	Vaughan Azzurri C	3

Semi-finals

November 6, 2021	Woodbridge Strikers B	0–2	FC London B	Vaughan, Ontario
7:00 PM		Report	Rycobel 12'; Barrowcliffe 53'	Stadium: Vaughan Grove Sports Park

November 7, 2021	Athlete Institute	1–4	Vaughan Azzurri C	Caledon, Ontario
7:00 PM	9'	Report	Spittle 14', 49'; Sciortino 18'; Martin 71'	Stadium: The Hill Academy

Final

November 14, 2021	FC London B	0–3	Vaughan Azzurri C	Vaughan, Ontario
4:00 PM		Report	Martin 44', 80'; Spittle 68'	Stadium: Ontario Soccer Centre; Referee: Melvin Christopher
