= 2018 League1 Ontario season =

League1 Ontario Men's Division
- Season: 2018
- Champions: Vaughan Azzurri
- L1 Cup champions: Vaughan Azzurri
- Matches: 136
- Goals: 488 (3.59 per match)
- Top goalscorer: Anthony Novak (18 goals)
- Best goalkeeper: Lucas Birnstingl (0.42 GAA)
- Highest scoring: TFC III 10–0 Windsor (Jun 17); Oakville 10–0 Sanjaxx (Aug 26)

The 2018 Men's League1 Ontario season was the fifth season of play for League1 Ontario, a Division 3 men's soccer league in the Canadian soccer pyramid and the highest level of soccer based in the Canadian province of Ontario.

Vaughan Azzurri won the league championship and earned entry into the 2019 Canadian Championship; the top national tournament for men's soccer teams. Vaughan captured the league double for a second time by also winning the L1 Cup, a feat they first achieved in 2016. FC London finished the season with the best regular season record, earning 38 points in 16 games.

== Changes from 2017 ==
The men's division grew slightly to 17 teams for this season, with the addition of Darby FC, Unionville Milliken SC, and Alliance United FC (a joint partnership between Markham SC and Wexford SC). Durham United FA and North Toronto Nitros did not return for this season.

During the off-season, Jim Brennan stepped down as head of Aurora FC to accept a position with York 9 FC in the Canadian Premier League. FC London also announced the affiliation of its youth academy with professional side Toronto FC.

This season saw expanded playoffs and a return to single-table competition for the men's division. The top eight teams overall from the men's division entered the playoffs, which consisted of a group stage and a final championship match between the winner of each group. The women's side saw a shorter season which ended in August, followed by a four-team elimination playoff for the league title.

== Teams ==
League1 Ontario Men's Division
Team	City	Principal stadium	Founded	First season	Head coach (Note: Unless otherwise noted, this information was obtained from team directories on the league website)
Alliance United	Markham	Centennial College	2018	2018	(Canada) Ilya Orlov
Aurora FC	Aurora	Stewart Burnett Park	1964	2016	(Republic of Ireland) Derek O'Keefe
Darby FC	Whitby	Whitby Soccer Centre	2018	2018	(Scotland) David Thorburn
FC London	London	German Canadian FC Stadium	2008	2016	(Canada) Michael Marcoccia
Master's Futbol	Toronto (Scarborough)	L'Amoreaux Park	2012	2014	(Trinidad and Tobago) Rick Titus
North Mississauga SC	Mississauga	Hershey Centre	1982	2016	(Canada) Sam Medeiros
Oakville Blue Devils	Oakville	Sheridan Trafalgar Stadium (Note: Some matches were played at Bronte Athletic Park)	1994	2015	(England) Duncan Wilde
Ottawa South United Force	Ottawa	Quinn's Pointe (Note: Ottawa South United Force played one home match against Windsor TFC Stars at the Ontario Soccer Centre)	2017	2017	(Zimbabwe) Peter Mapendere
ProStars FC	Brampton	Victoria Park Stadium (Note: Some matches were played at Terry Fox Park)	2015	2015	(Hungary) Josef Komlodi
Sanjaxx Lions	Toronto	Monarch Park Stadium	2012	2015	(Jamaica) Patrick Lowe
Sigma FC	Mississauga	Hershey Centre	2005	2014	(Canada) Bobby Smyrniotis
Toronto FC III	Toronto (North York)	KIA Training Ground	2008	2014	(England) Danny Dichio
Toronto Skillz FC	Toronto (Scarborough)	Birchmount Stadium	2008	2016	(Trinidad and Tobago) Leslie Fitzpatrick
Unionville Milliken SC	Unionville	Bill Crothers Park	2018	2018	(Italy) Emanuele Ameltonis
Vaughan Azzurri	Vaughan (Maple)	McNaughton Park	2014	2014	(Canada) Carmine Isacco
Windsor TFC Stars	Windsor	University of Windsor Stadium	2004	2014	(Canada) Zibby Piatkiewicz
Woodbridge Strikers	Vaughan (Woodbridge)	Vaughan Grove	1976	2014	(Canada) Peter Pinizzotto

Location of Men's Division teams for the 2018 League1 Ontario season.
Current team See Toronto inset
Location of Men's Division teams in or near Toronto for the 2018 League1 Ontario season.
Current team

== Regular season ==
Each team played 16 matches as part of the season; one match against all other teams. The top eight teams competed in the league playoffs at the end of the season, the winner of which earned entry into the 2019 Canadian Championship.

Pos	Team	Pld	W	D	L	GF	GA	GD	Pts	Qualification
1	FC London	16	12	2	2	49	19	+30	38	Playoffs
2	Sigma FC	16	11	4	1	33	9	+24	37	Playoffs
3	Oakville Blue Devils	16	10	5	1	41	9	+32	35	Playoffs
4	Toronto FC III	16	10	3	3	48	25	+23	33	No playoffs (Note: Toronto FC III voluntarily withdrew from league playoffs.)
5	Vaughan Azzurri (C, X)	16	10	1	5	45	23	+22	31	Playoffs
6	Woodbridge Strikers	16	8	4	4	43	18	+25	28	Playoffs
7	Alliance United FC	16	7	3	6	34	24	+10	24	Playoffs
8	Unionville Milliken SC	16	6	5	5	25	21	+4	23	Playoffs
9	Darby FC	16	6	3	7	22	27	−5	21	Playoffs
10	Master's Futbol	16	4	7	5	28	28	0	19	
11	Sanjaxx Lions	16	5	3	8	14	26	−12	18	
12	Toronto Skillz FC	16	4	2	10	25	50	−25	14	
13	North Mississauga SC	16	3	4	9	15	30	−15	13	
14	Ottawa South United	16	3	4	9	19	50	−31	13	
15	Aurora FC	16	3	3	10	20	40	−20	12	
16	ProStars FC	16	2	4	10	14	34	−20	10	
17	Windsor TFC	16	1	5	10	13	55	−42	8	

Source: http://www.league1ontario.com/page/show/2309115-standings
Rules for classification: 1) points; 2) goal differential; 3) head-to-head points; 4) head-to-head goal differential; 5) playoff match
(C) Champion and qualification to 2019 Canadian Championship; (X) L1 Cup winner

== Playoffs ==
The top eight teams from the regular season were divided into two groups of four for the playoffs. Each team played three matches; one match against all other teams in their group. The top team from each group advanced to the league championship, the winner of which earned entry into the 2019 Canadian Championship.

=== Group stage ===
Group A

Pos	Team	Pld	W	D	L	GF	GA	GD	Pts	Qualification	VGN	DBY	ALU	LON
1	Vaughan Azzurri (O)	3	3	0	0	8	2	+6	9	League Championship	—	4–0	1–0	3–2
2	Darby FC	3	1	1	1	3	6	−3	4			—	2–1	1–1
3	Alliance United FC	3	1	0	2	2	3	−1	3				—	1–0
4	FC London	3	0	1	2	3	5	−2	1					—

Source: https://www.league1ontario.com/standings/show/3999907?subseason=553364
Rules for classification: 1) points; 2) total wins; 3) head-to-head points; 4) head-to-head goal differential; 5) playoff match
(O) Play-off winners

Group B

Pos	Team	Pld	W	D	L	GF	GA	GD	Pts	Qualification	WDB	SIG	OAK	UNV
1	Woodbridge Strikers	3	2	1	0	8	3	+5	7	League Championship	—	3–1	2–2	3–0
2	Sigma FC	3	2	0	1	6	6	0	6			—	3–2	2–1
3	Oakville Blue Devils	3	1	1	1	6	5	+1	4				—	2–0
4	Unionville Milliken SC	3	0	0	3	1	7	−6	0					—

Source: https://www.league1ontario.com/standings/show/3999907?subseason=553364
Rules for classification: 1) points; 2) total wins; 3) head-to-head points; 4) head-to-head goal differential; 5) playoff match

=== League Championship ===
The league champion was determined by a single match between the two group winners in the first round of the playoffs. The winner qualified for the 2019 Canadian Championship.

October 20, 2018	Vaughan Azzurri	2–0	Woodbridge Strikers	Vaughan, Ontario
3:00 pm ET	Sacramento 35'; Ricci 89'			Stadium: Ontario Soccer Centre

== L1 Cup ==
The L1 Cup tournament is a separate contest from the rest of the season, in which all 17 teams from the men's division took part. It is not a form of playoffs at the end of the season (as is typically seen in North American sports), but is more like the EFL Cup, albeit only for League1 Ontario teams. All matches are separate from the regular season, and are not reflected in the season standings.

The cup tournament for the men's division is a single-match knockout tournament with a total of four rounds culminating in a final match in the start of August, with initial matches determined by random draw. Each match in the tournament must return a result; any match drawn after 90 minutes advanced directly to kicks from the penalty mark instead of extra time.

Preliminary round
Alliance United	2 (4)
Darby FC	2 (5)

First round
FC London	2
Darby FC	0
Sigma FC	4
Sanjaxx Lions	0
ProStars FC	2 (4)
Aurora FC	2 (3)
Windsor TFC Stars	1
Toronto FC III	4
Master's Futbol	4
Unionville Milliken SC	0
Oakville Blue Devils	3
Toronto Skillz	1
North Mississauga SC	0
Vaughan Azzurri	6
Woodbridge Strikers	4
Ottawa South United	1

Quarterfinals
FC London	0
Sigma FC	8
ProStars FC	0
Toronto FC III	3
Master's Futbol	2
Oakville Blue Devils	3
Vaughan Azzurri	2
Woodbridge Strikers	0

Semifinals
Sigma FC	1 (5)
Toronto FC III	1 (6)
Oakville Blue Devils	0
Vaughan Azzurri	2

Final
Toronto FC III	1
Vaughan Azzurri	2

=== Preliminary round ===
May 8, 2018	Alliance United	2–2 (4–5 p)	Darby FC	Toronto, Ontario
8:00 pm	Beader 74', 90+2'	Report; Article	Young 80'; Sears 82'	Stadium: L'Amoreaux Park

=== First round ===
May 26, 2018	FC London	2–0	Darby FC	London, Ontario
	Seymour 50'; Pucci 90'	Report; Article		Stadium: German Canadian FC Stadium

May 27, 2018	Sanjaxx Lions	0–4	Sigma FC	Toronto, Ontario
		Report; Article	Zajac 23', 86'; Buchanan 34'; Thomas 74'	Stadium: Monarch Park Stadium

May 27, 2018	Aurora FC	2–2 (3–4 p)	ProStars FC	Aurora, Ontario
	Rennie 10'; Juta 80'	Report; Article	George 40'; Chrysanthou 90'	Stadium: Stewart Burnett Park
	Penalties
	Doner (penalty scored); Juta (penalty scored); Buitrago (penalty missed); Perez Padilla (penalty scored); Medeiros (penalty missed)		George (penalty scored); Zwierzynski (penalty scored); Arora (penalty scored); Klinovskyy (penalty scored)

May 27, 2018	Windsor TFC Stars	1–4	Toronto FC III	Windsor, Ontario
	Pio 55'	Report; Article	Dada-Luke 17'; Hamilton 38'; Corbeanu 53'; Bilousov 71'	Stadium: University of Windsor Stadium

May 26, 2018	Master's Futbol	4–0	Unionville Milliken SC	Toronto, Ontario
	Reid 4'; Rollocks 36'; De Sousa 65'; Brown 69'	Report; Article		Stadium: L'Amoreaux Park

May 26, 2018	Toronto Skillz	1–3	Oakville Blue Devils	Toronto, Ontario
	Jashan 54'	Report; Article	Hernandez 12'; Khalon 46'; Santos 65'	Stadium: Birchmount Stadium

May 26, 2018	Vaughan Azzurri	6–0	North Mississauga SC	Vaughan, Ontario
	Raposo 22'; Lay 48', 76'; Kloutsouniotis 85', 92'; Kotsopoulos 90'	Report; Article		Stadium: McNaughton Park

May 27, 2018	Woodbridge Strikers	4–1	Ottawa South United	Vaughan, Ontario
	Isaac 3'; El Zeir 5'; Rayne 50', 67'	Report; Article	Cornwall 81'	Stadium: Vaughan Grove Park

=== Quarterfinals ===
June 22, 2018	Sigma FC	8–0	FC London	Mississauga, Ontario
9:00 pm	Walton 3'; Thomas 6', 55', 77'; Smith 11', 22'; Stoddart 29'; Jodah 84'	Report		Stadium: Hershey Centre

June 23, 2018	ProStars FC	0–3	Toronto FC III	Brampton, Ontario
8:30 pm		Report	Gorgees 33'; Dada-Luke 43'; Hamilton 64'	Stadium: Victoria Park Stadium

June 24, 2018	Oakville Blue Devils	2–2 (4–2 p)	Master's Futbol	Oakville, Ontario
6:00 pm	Khalon 37'; Gallo 61'	Report	Reid 33'; *Brown 80'	Stadium: Sheridan Trafalgar Stadium
	Penalties
	Vilela (penalty scored); McNamara (penalty missed); Ademolu (penalty scored); DiFeo (penalty scored); Kahlon (penalty scored)		Reid (penalty scored); Woods (penalty missed); Fenton (penalty missed); De Sousa (penalty scored)

June 24, 2018	Woodbridge Strikers	0–2	Vaughan Azzurri	Vaughan, Ontario
7:00 pm		Report	Skublak 57'; Jason Mills 90'	Stadium: Vaughan Grove Park

=== Semifinals ===
July 21, 2018	Toronto FC III	1–1 (6–5 p)	Sigma FC	Toronto, Ontario
4:00 pm	Dada-Luke 23'	Report	Afzaly 33'	Stadium: BMO Training Ground
	Penalties
	Mandekic (penalty missed); Abdi (penalty scored); Gorgees (penalty scored); Dada-Luke (penalty scored); Singh (penalty scored); Priso (penalty scored); Mazzaferro (penalty scored)		Walton (penalty missed); Frano (penalty scored); Goldhar (penalty scored); Zajac (penalty scored); Velastegui (penalty scored); Stergiotis (penalty scored); Anagho-Ntamark (penalty missed)

July 22, 2018	Oakville Blue Devils	0–2	Vaughan Azzurri	Oakville, Ontario
4:00 pm		Report	Whiteman 48'; Kovacevic 63'	Stadium: Sheridan Trafalgar Stadium

=== Final ===
August 4, 2018	Vaughan Azzurri	2–1	Toronto FC III	Vaughan, Ontario
7:30PM	Kotsopoulos 4', 61'	Report	Gorgees 78'	Stadium: Ontario Soccer Centre

== Statistics ==
=== Top goalscorers ===
Rank	Player	Club	Goals
1	(Canada) Anthony Novak	Oakville Blue Devils	18
2	(Canada) Connor Wilson	FC London	14
3	(Canada) Zakaria Abdi	Toronto FC III	10
3	(Canada) Jose De Sousa	Master's Futbol	10
3	(Canada) Dylan Sacramento	Vaughan Azzurri	10
6	(Canada) Emmanuel Isaac	Woodbridge Strikers	9
7	(Canada) Steven Furlano	Alliance United	8
8	(Canada) Marcel Zajac	Sigma FC	7
9	(Ten players tied)		6

Updated to matches played on August 18, 2018. Source:

=== Top goalkeepers ===
Rank	Player	Club	Minutes	GAA
1	(Canada) Lucas Birnstingl	Oakville / Unionville	1080	0.42
2	(Canada) Triston Henry	Sigma FC	1440	0.56
3	(Canada) Matt George	Oakville / Vaughan	720	0.75
4	(Canada) Roberto Stillo	Woodbridge Strikers	900	0.90
5	(Canada) Michael Argyrides	Vaughan Azzurri	270	1.00
6	(Canada) Anthony Sokalski	FC London	1440	1.19
7	(Canada) Sebastien Sgarbossa	Toronto FC III	450	1.20
8	(Canada) Tayjon Campbell	Sanjaxx Lions	807	1.23
9	(Canada) Karman Saini	Oakville Blue Devils	360	1.25
10	(Canada) Mark Rogal	Alliance United	1170	1.31

Updated to matches played on August 18, 2018. Minimum 270 minutes played. Source:

== Awards ==
The following players received honours in the 2018 season:

Award	Player (Club)
Most Valuable Player	Dylan Sacramento (Vaughan Azzurri)
Golden Boot	Anthony Novak (Oakville Blue Devils)
Coach of the Year	Mike Marcoccia (FC London)
Young Players of the Year	Marko Maletic (FC London); Kunle Dada-Luke (Toronto FC III)
Defender of the Year	Dominic Samuel (Sigma FC)
Goalkeeper of the Year	Robert Stillo (Woodbridge Strikers)
Fair Play Award	Matthew Arnone (Vaughan Azzurri)
Goal of the Year	Jack Sears (Darby FC)

First Team All-Stars

Goalkeeper	Defenders	Midfielders	Forwards
Robert Stillo (Woodbridge Strikers)	Jarred Phillips (Vaughan Azzurri); Marko Maletic (FC London); Dominic Samuel (Sigma FC); Afram Gorgees (Toronto FC III)	Mohammed Reza Nafa (FC London); Giuliano Frano (Sigma FC); Dylan Sacramento (Vaughan Azzurri)	Kadell Thomas (Sigma FC); Anthony Novak (Oakville Blue Devils); Austin Ricci (Vaughan Azzurri)

Second Team All-Stars

Goalkeeper	Defenders	Midfielders	Forwards
Triston Henry (Sigma FC)	Justin Springer (Vaughan Azzurri); Konnor McNamara (Oakville Blue Devils); Parker Seymour (FC London); Morey Doner (Aurora FC)	Matthew Arnone (Vaughan Azzurri); Mehdi Essoussi (Toronto FC III); Stefan Nikolic (Sanjaxx Lions)	Connor Wilson (FC London); Kunle Dada-Luke (Toronto FC III); Emmanuel Issac (Woodbridge Strikers)

Third Team All-Stars

Goalkeeper	Defenders	Midfielders	Forwards
Lukas Birsingl (Oakville/Unionville)	Tim Mahabir (Toronto Skillz); Reggie Laryea (Sigma FC); Bruce Cullen (Woodbridge Strikers); Aaron Schneebli (FC London); Michael Borowski (ProStars FC); Brendan Woodfull (Windsor TFC)	Raphael Reynolds (Darby FC); Lee Victor Massunda (North Mississauga); Barou Junior Mbuyamba (Ottawa South United); Mansoor Alfazy (Sigma FC); Joshua Paredes-Proctor (Woodbridge Strikers); Josh Moreira (Toronto FC III)	Steven Furlano (Alliance United/Darby); Jose De Sousa (Woodbridge/Masters FA); Tre Crosby (Unionville Milliken); Filipe Vilela (Oakville Blue Devils); Marcel Zajac (Sigma FC)

== All-Star Game ==
The league announced that an All-Star Game between League1 Ontario and the Première Ligue de soccer du Québec (PLSQ) would once again take place this season. The game was hosted by the PLSQ and was played on June 30.

June 30	PLSQ All-Stars	2–2 (1–4 p)	L1O All-Stars	Montreal, Quebec
8:00 pm	Cossette 71'; Spenard-Lapierre 77'	Report	Novak 29'; Whiteman 40'	Stadium: Stade Desjardins

League1 Ontario All-Stars
Pos.	Name	Team
Starters
GK	Triston Henry	Sigma FC
D	Bruce Cullen	Woodbridge Strikers
D	Dominic Samuel	Sigma FC
D	Marko Maletic	FC London
D	Morey Doner	Aurora FC
MF	Joshua Parades-Procter	Woodbridge Strikers
MF	Matthew Arnone	Vaughan Azzurri
MF	Joey Melo	Masters FA
MF	Kadell Thomas	Sigma FC
F	Jarek Whiteman	Vaughan Azzurri
F	Anthony Novak	Oakville Blue Devils
Substitutes
GK	Robert Stillo	Woodbridge Strikers
D	Lukas MacNaughton	Alliance United
D	Devon Bowyer	Alliance United
D	Ignazio Muccilli	Woodbridge Strikers
MF	Nikola Stakic	Alliance United
MF	Raphael Reynolds	Darby FC
MF	Stefan Nikolic	Sanjaxx Lions
F	Tre Crosby	Unionville Milliken
F	Andrew Gordon	Sanjaxx Lions
F	Jose De Sousa	Sanjaxx Lions
