= Andrew Ornoch =

Polish-born Canadian soccer player

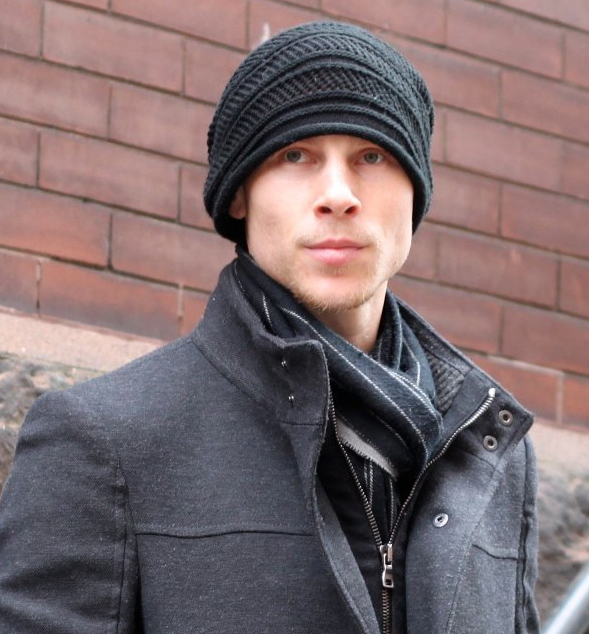
- Ornoch in 2010

Personal information
- Full name: Andrzej Mateusz Ornoch
- Date of birth: 21 August 1985 (age 41)
- Place of birth: Warsaw, Poland
- Height: 1.90 m (6 ft 3 in)
- Positions: Midfielder; forward

Team information
- Current team: The Borough FC (head coach)

Youth career
- 1995–1999: North Scarborough SC
- 1999–2001: PSA Toronto
- 2002–2005: Erin Mills SC

College career
Years	Team	Apps	(Gls)
2003–2005	Detroit Mercy Titans	59	(26)

Senior career*
Years	Team	Apps	(Gls)
2002	Mississauga Olympians	2	(0)
2006–2008	Lombard-Pápa	34	(10)
2008–2009	Esbjerg	13	(1)
2009–2010	Heracles Almelo	1	(0)
2010	Veendam	9	(3)
2011	Mississauga Eagles FC	3	(1)
2011	Telstar	7	(1)
2014	Vaughan Azzurri		(10)

International career^{‡}
2008	Canada U23	5	(0)
2006–2009	Canada	3	(0)

Managerial career
- 2024–: The Borough FC
- * Club domestic league appearances and goals ‡ National team caps and goals as of May 30, 2009

Andrzej Mateusz Ornoch (born August 21, 1985) is a former professional soccer player who currently serves as the head coach of The Borough FC in the League1 Ontario Championship. Born in Poland, he represented Canada at international level.

== Early life ==
Ornoch was born in Poland, but moved to Toronto, Canada at age three with his parents. He began playing youth soccer with North Scarborough SC. He later played with Erin Mills SC.

== College career ==
In 2003, he began attending the University of Detroit Mercy, where he played for the men's soccer team. In 2005, he was named Player of the Year, Offensive Player of the Year, and named to the All-Horizon League First Team. Over his three seasons with the team, he scored 26 goals in 59 appearances.

== Club career ==
In 2002, Ornoch began his senior career, briefly playing with the Mississauga Olympians of the Canadian Soccer League.

In May 2006, he signed with Hungarian club Lombard Papa FC, forgoing his final season of college eligibility.

In January 2008, he signed a four-year contract with Danish club Esbjerg.

In August 2009, he signed with Dutch side Heracles Almelo on a one-year contract, with two option years. He made one appearance with the team against VVV-Venlo, but did not see any other action, before being released by the club in March 2010.

In August 2010, following a trial period, he signed with Dutch club BV Veendam. He joined on an amateur basis, with the possibility of securing a permanent contract.

In January 2011, it was reported that he bought out his contract with his Dutch club, with the promise to join Canadian Major League Soccer club Toronto FC, but a contract was not signed. However, in March 2011, he joined the club on a trial basis in pre-season. Afterwards, he joined the Mississauga Eagles FC of the Canadian Soccer League.

In July 2011, he signed with SC Telstar in the Dutch Eerste Divisie. He made his club debut on August 4, 2011 against the Go Ahead Eagles. However, he suffered an injury shortly after. In November 2012, fourteen months after suffering his injury, he began training with the club again (although his contract had expired at the end of the previous season).

In 2014, he played with Vaughan Azzurri in League1 Ontario.

== International career ==
Ornoch made his debut with the Canada national team on November 12, 2006 in a friendly against Hungary. He also played with the Canada U23 at the 2008 CONCACAF Men's Olympic Qualifying tournament.

== Post-playing career ==
In 2011, he founded Dutch Connections FC, in his hometown of Scarborough, with his former Heracles Almelo teammate Jörg van Nieuwenhuijzen . He holds a National ‘B’ Coaching license and is working towards his National 'A' Coaching License. In 2024, he served as head coach of The Borough FC (formed by Dutch Connections) in League2 Ontario, and was named the Central Division Coach of the Year.
