= Kaeson Trench =

Barbadian footballer

Personal information
- Date of birth: 16 January 2000 (age 26)
- Place of birth: Montreal, Quebec, Canada
- Position: Defender

Youth career
- 2014–2016: GSSA Academy
- 2016–2018: Notre Dame
- 2018–2019: Toronto FC

Senior career*
Years	Team	Apps	(Gls)
2018	Toronto FC III	10	(0)
2020	Cheadle Town FC	1	(0)
2021	1812 FC Barrie	6	(0)

International career
- Barbados U17
2018	Barbados U20	4	(0)
2019	Barbados U23		
2018–	Barbados	6	(0)
- * Club domestic league appearances and goals as of October 23, 2021

Kaeson Trench (born 16 January 2000) is a professional footballer who plays as a defender. Born in Canada, he represents Barbados internationally.

== Early life ==
Trench joined the GSS Academy in Mississauga, Ontario in 2014. In 2016, he joined Notre Dame SC in Barbados. He later joined the Toronto FC Academy.

== Club career ==
In 2018, he began playing for Toronto FC III in League1 Ontario, making his debut on April 29, 2018, against FC London.

In 2020, he played with Cheadle Town FC in the North West Counties Football League Division One South, the tenth tier in England.

In 2021, he began playing with 1812 FC Barrie in League1 Ontario, making his debut on August 21 against the North Toronto Nitros.

== International career ==
At the youth level he captained the Barbados U17s during CFU U-17 Tournament qualifiers. He also played in the 2018 CONCACAF U-20 Championship and 2020 CONCACAF Men's Olympic Qualifying Championship qualification.

Trench made his debut for the Barbados national football team in a 3-0 2019–20 CONCACAF Nations League qualifying loss to El Salvador on 13 October 2018. He also captained the Barbados U20s at the 2018 CONCACAF U-20 Championship.
