= Mississauga MetroStars =

Former professional arena soccer team in Canada

- Founded: 2018
- Dissolved: 2019
- Stadium: Paramount Fine Foods Centre
- Owner: Gladiator Sports Media Entertainment Corp
- League: Major Arena Soccer League
- 2018–19: 4th, Eastern Division; Playoffs: DNQ
- Website: http://www.metrostars.ca/

Mississauga MetroStars (briefly known as MetroStars Canada in 2019) were a professional indoor soccer team that played its home games at the Paramount Fine Foods Centre in Mississauga, a suburb of Toronto, Ontario, Canada. The team joined the Major Arena Soccer League for the 2018–19 season. The club featured former Toronto FC players Dwayne De Rosario, Molham Babouli, and Adrian Cann on the roster in its first season. Just as the 2019–20 season began, it was announced that the team would cease operations.

== History ==
=== Background ===
Historically, the Canadian professional indoor soccer landscape consisted of Canadian franchises in American leagues, particularly in the North American Soccer League (NASL) and the National Professional Soccer League (NPSL). The height of Canadian participation in indoor soccer occurred during the 1980–81 and 1981–82 NASL seasons, when four Canadian clubs participated simultaneously. The height of Canadian participation in the NPSL would eventually expand to include four teams, which consisted of the Edmonton Drillers, Montreal Impact, Toronto Shooting Stars, and Toronto ThunderHawks. After the demise of the NPSL in 2001, the country was without a professional league structure until the creation of the Canadian Major Indoor Soccer League (CMISL) in 2007. The league served as the first exclusively Canadian professional indoor soccer league and was primarily based in Western Canada until it ceased operations in 2012.

In 2017, the Canadian Arena Soccer Association (CASA) was founded as the governing body for the sport in Canada. The CASA sanctioned the developmental Youth Arena Premier League and the semi-professional Arena Premier League, both based in Mississauga. The purpose of the Arena Premier League was to develop and provide talent to the Canadian national indoor team, and later to the MetroStars.

=== Formation and dissolution ===
The MetroStars were founded in 2018 and were one of 17 participants in the 2018–19 Major Arena Soccer League season. They made their debut on December 1 against the defending league champion Baltimore Blast. According to team owner Gladiator Sports, the MetroStars' payroll for the year was about $500,000. The team finished the 2018–19 season 15th in the league with a record of 4 wins, 20 losses, and ranked 14th in attendance with an average of 1,020 per game.

For the 2019–20 season, the team rebranded as MetroStars Canada. They planned to play their 12 home games in six cities across Ontario (St. Catharines, Kingston, Oshawa, Windsor, Sarnia, and Brampton) to spread awareness for the sport. Before playing a single game that season, the Major Arena Soccer League published a revised schedule that did not include the MetroStars. Six days later, the team confirmed that they would not be participating in the season due to issues coordinating their home matches.

== 2018–19 roster ==
=== Final roster ===
- As of 24 August 2019

Note: Flags indicate national team as defined under FIFA eligibility rules; some limited exceptions apply. Players may hold more than one non-FIFA nationality.

No.	Pos.	Nation	Player
2	FW	CAN	Jarred Phillips
3	DF	CRO	Josip Keran
4	FW	CAN	Adrian Cann
5	MF	JAM	Halburto Harris
6	MF	CAN	Matthew Rios
8	DF	CAN	Joshua Paredes
10	MF	CAN	Marco Rodriguez
11	DF	CAN	Mark Jankovic
12	FW	CAN	Massimo Mirabelli
13	FW	CAN	Damion Graham
14	FW	CAN	Dwayne De Rosario (Captain)

No.	Pos.	Nation	Player
18	FW	SYR	Molham Babouli
23	FW	GUY	Shaquille Agard
32	DF	JAM	Darren Chambers
44	MF	CAN	Raheem Rose
87	MF	CAN	Shawn Brown
88	MF	CAN	Luis Rocha
89	GK	CAN	Adrian Becic
91	MF	CAN	David Velastegui
96	MF	COL	Sebastian López
99	FW	CAN	Jonathan Osorio
99	GK	CAN	Sebastian Zeballos

=== Inactive players ===
Note: Flags indicate national team as defined under FIFA eligibility rules; some limited exceptions apply. Players may hold more than one non-FIFA nationality.

No.	Pos.	Nation	Player
1	GK	CAN	Justin Barrett
7	MF	IRN	Sina Khandan
11	MF	CAN	Anthony Osorio
15	DF	SRB	Alen Kucalovic
17	MF	CAN	Mario Orestano

No.	Pos.	Nation	Player
19	MF	UKR	Vasyl Zhuk
21	DF	CAN	Jesse Assing
22	GK	CAN	Spyros Stergiotis
92	MF	CAN	Martinho Dumevski

== Head coaches ==
Coach	Tenure	Record			
Coach	Tenure	G	W	L	Win %
Phil Ionadi	September 14, 2018 – February 28, 2019	16	3	13	18.75%
Rick Titus	February 28, 2019 – 2019	8	1	7	12.5%
John Williams	2019	0	0	0	0%

== Records ==
=== Year-by-year ===
Season	League	Teams	Record	Rank	Playoffs	Average attendance	Ref
2018–19	Major Arena Soccer League (Eastern Division)	17	4–20	4th	did not qualify	1,020	
