= Rickey Sayers =

Grenadian footballer

Personal information
- Full name: Rickey Paul Sayers
- Date of birth: February 9, 1990 (age 36)
- Place of birth: Toronto, Ontario, Canada
- Position: Midfielder

Senior career*
Years	Team	Apps	(Gls)
2013	York Region Shooters B		
2015	ProStars FC		
2017	1. FCA Darmstadt		

International career
2017	Grenada	2	(0)
- * Club domestic league appearances and goals as of December 28, 2018

Rickey Sayers (born February 9, 1990) is a former footballer. Born in Canada, he represented Grenada internationally.

== Playing career ==
Sayers played in the Canadian Soccer League in 2013 with York Region Shooters B in the Second Division. In 2015, he played in League1 Ontario with ProStars FC. In 2017, he played abroad in the Verbandsliga Hessen-Süd with 1. FCA Darmstadt.

== International career ==
Sayers made his debut for the Grenada national football team on October 24, 2017, against Panama in a friendly match. He made his second appearance on November 12, 2017, against Trinidad and Tobago.
