= 1812 FC Barrie =

Canadian soccer team

1812 FC
- Full name: 1812 Football Club Barrie
- Founded: 2020
- Dissolved: 2022
- Stadium: Terry Fox Stadium, Brampton, Ontario
- Owners: Andrew Weilgus & Kempenfelt Crew Supporters Group
- League: League1 Ontario
- 2021: 5th, East; Playoffs: DNQ
- Website: https://1812fc.com/

1812 FC Barrie (also known as 1812 FC) was a Canadian semi-professional soccer club that played in League1 Ontario in 2021. In their sole season of operation, the club played home matches at Terry Fox Stadium in Brampton, Ontario. The team was originally set to play at Georgian College in Barrie, but the venue was closed to outside groups in 2021 due to the COVID-19 pandemic.

== History ==
The club's origins begin in late 2019, when local Barrie soccer fan Ronan Cordelle began campaigning to bring a professional soccer club to the city. Cordelle and fellow resident, Jacob Sanderson, began a petition to attract a club to city to play in the Canadian Premier League, which they tentatively nicknamed as the Kempenfelt Crew. The petition received widespread support including from figures such as former professional player Danny Dichio, Gambian national team coach Tom Saintfiet, Sunderland AFC chair Niall Quinn as well as several local politicians. Cordelle reached out to Andrew Weilgus, the owner of New Jersey-based National Premier Soccer League club Atlantic City FC, over LinkedIn, who was interested in the project and familiar with the region. In March 2020, the COVID-19 pandemic shut down the NPSL season, which resulted in Weilgus taking a greater interest into establishing the project and he reached out others to further discussions about forming a new club, with Weilgus handling the branding, marketing, and development for the new club, while others worked reached out to League1 Ontario to discuss what was needed for the club to be eligible. The club's formation was officially announced in June 2020. The club reached out to Georgian College with the aim of playing their matches out of Georgian's J.C. Massie Field, which has seating capacity of 474, as well standing room sections that accommodate approximately 1000 spectators.

The club initially partnered with local youth team Barrie Soccer Club, who were to be responsible for technical side of 1812 FC, including hiring coaches, recruiting players, both at the senior and reserve team levels, and ultimately the on-field product. However, in early 2021, there was a reshuffling and Barrie SC left the partnership, and instead 1812 FC partnered with Innisfil Soccer Club. In June 2021, they formed a partnership with ANB Futbol, an Ontario-based soccer academy and former League1 Ontario team.

In February 2021, it was announced that the club would officially join League1 Ontario for the 2021 season. The club planned to enter team in the League1 Ontario women's division beginning in 2023 or 2024. They played their first match on August 1, 2021, on the road against Vaughan Azzurri, losing 3–0. Due to restrictions put in place at Georgian College not allowing non-students onto the campus grounds, the club was forced to relocate their home matches to Terry Fox Stadium in Brampton for 2021. They got their first win on August 14, defeating the Woodbridge Strikers by a score of 5–2.

At the end of the 2021 season, the team parted ways with head coach Trever Guy and announced that ANB Futbol, with whom they had formed a partnership with in June 2021, would be taking over and managing all aspects of 1812's technical staff beginning in the 2022 season. However, ahead of the 2022 season, it was announced by the league that 1812 FC would be departing the league, to be replaced by a new expansion club Burlington SC.

== Club name and crests ==
1812 FC Barrie secondary logos

The club's name is a reference to the city of Barrie's founding in the year 1812, as a result of the War of 1812. Weilgus wanted the club to have a Canadian sense of independence and history, and the club name is not an attempt to glorify war. The club crest features a horseshoe as a reference to the Golden Horseshoe region in Ontario and the decision to use a golden leaf is a nod to the fall season beauty of Barrie rather than to use the traditional red maple leaf seen in plenty of Canadian sides. The club also unveiled multiple other secondary logos.

== Ownership and management ==
The club's ownership originally was set to consist of a partnership between a variety of groups including Andrew Weilgus, Peter Raco, the Barrie Soccer Club, former Canadian national team player Julian De Guzman, and the Kempenfelt Crew supporters group. The supporter's group ownership will be in the form of a Supporters' Trust, similar to many clubs in the United Kingdom, which will give community members a long-term voice in the management of the club. The trust will be written into the club's constitution to prevent it from being removed with Ronan Cordelle, the original fan who created the petition to bring a team to the city, being named as the trust's director. De Guzman was also to serve as the club's president, in addition to his role as co-owner. However, in January 2021, a major shift occurred with Raco, De Guzman and the Barrie Soccer Club departed the club to form a new club named FC Barrie, which was later renamed as Simcoe County Rovers FC. 1812 FC partnered with Innisfil Soccer Club as their new community partner.

Professional player Jeremy Hall will serve as an advisor to the club. Former Arsenal F.C. Director of scouting Francis Cagigao joined the club's board of directors and will be responsible for player development and oversee the club's international scouting and relationships. Former FC Edmonton head coach Jeff Paulus joined the club in a volunteer advisory role in 2021.

== Seasons ==
Season	League	Teams	Record	Rank	Playoffs	Ref
2021	League1 Ontario	15	4–1–7	5th, East (11th overall)	Did not qualify	

== Notable players ==
The following players have either played at the professional or international level, either before or after playing for the League1 Ontario team:

- (Puerto Rico) Jeremy Hall
- (Pakistan) Navid Rahman
- (Guyana) (Canada) Quillan Roberts
- (Barbados) Kaeson Trench
