= Navid Rahman =

Pakistani footballer

Personal information
- Full name: Navid Rahman
- Date of birth: 26 May 1996 (age 30)
- Place of birth: Frankfurt, Germany
- Height: 1.85 m (6 ft 1 in)
- Position: Midfielder

Youth career
- Brampton Youth SC

College career
Years	Team	Apps	(Gls)
2014–2016	Niagara Purple Eagles	24	(0)

Senior career*
Years	Team	Apps	(Gls)
2016–2017	ProStars FC	19	(2)
2017	Komárno	6	(0)
2018	Achilles '29	0	(0)
2018–2019	ProStars FC	12	(0)
2019	North Mississauga SC	5	(0)
2021	1812 FC Barrie	11	(3)
2022	Blue Devils FC	8	(0)
2023	Woodbridge Strikers	16	(0)

International career^{‡}
2018–	Pakistan	2	(0)
- * Club domestic league appearances and goals as of 20 August 2023 ‡ National team caps and goals as of 6 June 2019

Navid Rahman (born 26 May 1996) is a footballer. Born in Germany, he represents the Pakistan national team. He plays as a midfielder.

== Club career ==
In 2016–17, Rahman played in League1 Ontario for ProStars FC, making a total of 19 appearances and scoring two goals.

In the summer of 2017, Rahman signed with Slovak 2. Liga club Komárno alongside his brother Adel Rahman. In 2018, he joined Dutch club Achilles '29.

Rahman returned to League1 Ontario in Canada in the summer of 2018, and made five appearances for ProStars that season. In 2019, he made seven league appearances before leaving mid-season. In mid 2019, Rahman switched to North Mississauga SC, making five league appearances and two in the playoffs. In 2021, he joined 1812 FC Barrie.

In 2022, he played with Blue Devils FC. In 2023, he played with the Woodbridge Strikers.

== International career ==
Rahman made his debut for the Pakistan national football team in a 2–1 friendly loss to Palestine on 16 November 2018.

Rahman was in the starting line up for Pakistan's 2022 FIFA World Cup qualifier play-off match against Cambodia.

== Personal life ==
Rahman was born in Germany to Pakistani parents, and moved to Canada at a young age. He played youth soccer for Brampton Youth SC.

== See also ==
- List of Pakistan international footballers born outside Pakistan
