= Adrian Bečić =

Croatian footballer

Personal information
- Date of birth: 27 January 1989 (age 37)
- Place of birth: Toronto, Canada
- Position: Goalkeeper

Youth career
- 2001–2007: NK Mosor

Senior career*
Years	Team	Apps	(Gls)
2006–2007	Mosor	4	(0)
2007–2009	Trogir	23	(0)
2009–2014	Dugopolje	65	(0)
2014–2015	Imotski	46	(0)
2016	Hamilton City		
2017–2018	Croatia AC (indoor)		
2018–2019	Mississauga MetroStars (indoor)	21	(0)
2019	Toronto Croatia		
- * Club domestic league appearances and goals

Adrian Bečić (born January 27, 1989) is a Canadian-born Croatian footballer who played as a goalkeeper.

== Club career ==
=== Croatia ===
Bečić was born in Toronto, Ontario, to Croatian parents who emigrated to Canada after the breakup of Yugoslavia. After the conclusion of the Yugoslav Wars, he returned to Croatia in 1995 which gained their independence as a result of the war. In 2001, he enlisted in NK Mosor Zrnovnica's youth system and graduated to the senior team for the 2006–07 season in the Croatian second-tier league. In his first professional season, he appeared in 4 matches. The following season, he signed with league rivals Trogir. He would play with Trogir for seasons where he appeared in 23 matches.

Bečić played in the Croatian third division with Dugopolje and helped the club secure a promotion by winning the league title. For the 2011–12 season, the club secured the second division title but was denied entry to the Croatian first division. In the 2011–12 season, he participated in the 2011–12 Croatian Football Cup where Dugopolje was eliminated from the competition by Zadar. In total, he played with Dugoplje for five seasons and appeared in 65 matches in the second division.

In 2014, he signed with Imotski. In his debut season with Imotski, he appeared in 27 matches. He re-signed with the club the following season. In his final season in the Croatian circuit, he appeared in 19 matches.

=== Canada ===
In the summer of 2016, he returned to Canada to play with the expansion side Hamilton City in the Canadian Soccer League. Bečić would help Hamilton secure a playoff berth. In the opening round of the postseason, he assisted the club in advancing by defeating Scarborough SC. In the next round, Hamilton defeated the divisional champions the York Region Shooters to advance to the CSL Championship. He played in the championship match where the Serbian White Eaglesdefeated Hamilton.

Bečić would play with Toronto Croatia in the 2019 edition of the Croatian World Club Championship where Croatia San Pedro defeated Toronto in the tournament finals by a penalty shootout.

=== Indoor career ===
In the winter season of 2017, Bečić transitioned into indoor soccer and played in the Greater Toronto Area-based Arena Premier League with Croatia AC. In their debut season, the Croats won the championship title.

The following winter season, he secured a contract with expansion side Mississauga MetroStars in the Major Arena Soccer League. He would also serve on the coaching staff as the team's strength and conditioning coach. He debuted for the MetroStars on December 1, 2018, against Baltimore Blast. He would record his first shutout for the team on December 8, 2018, against the Florida Tropics in the club's home opener. In total, he appeared in 21 matches for the club.

== Honors ==
AC Croatia

- APL Championship: 2017–18

Hamilton City

- CSL Championship runner–up: 2016

NK Dugopolje

- 2. HNL: 2011–12
- 3. HNL South: 2009–10
