= Jörg van Nieuwenhuijzen =

Dutch footballer

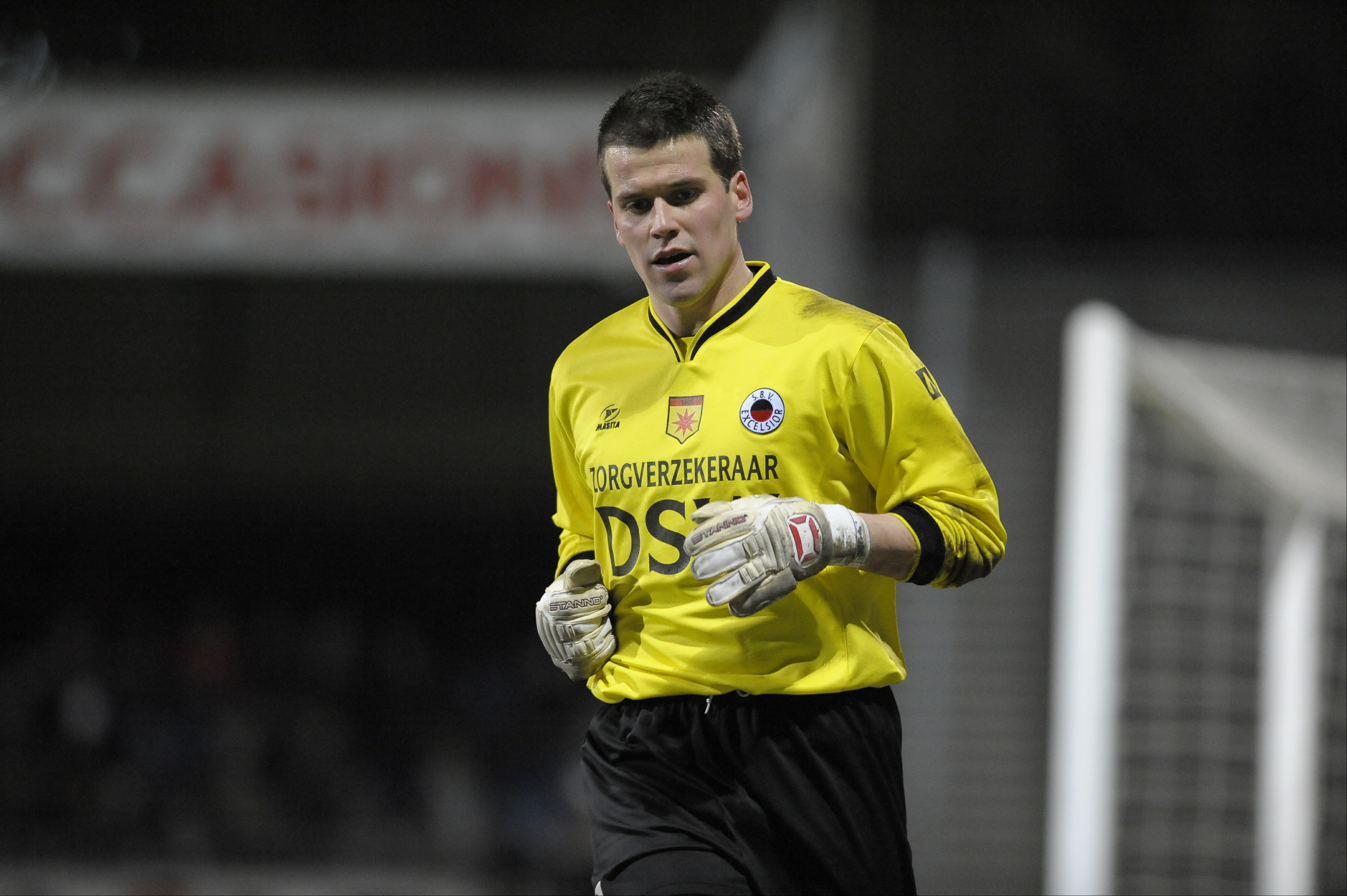
- van Nieuwenhuijzen with Excelsior in 2008

Personal information
- Full name: Jörg van Nieuwenhuijzen
- Date of birth: 22 August 1978 (age 48)
- Place of birth: Bergen op Zoom, Netherlands
- Height: 1.86 m (6 ft 1 in)
- Position: Goalkeeper

Youth career
- Tholen
- RBC Roosendaal

Senior career*
Years	Team	Apps	(Gls)
1996–2001	RBC Roosendaal	54	(0)
2001–2008	Excelsior	13	(0)
2008–2010	Heracles Almelo	1	(0)
2010–2011	HSV Hoek	29	(0)
2011–2013	FC Lienden	60	(0)
- * Club domestic league appearances and goals

Jörg van Nieuwenhuijzen (born 22 August 1978) is a retired Dutch professional footballer and sports entrepreneur. He played as a goalkeeper in the top tiers of Dutch football for RBC Roosendaal, Excelsior Rotterdam, and Heracles Almelo.

Following his retirement from professional football, van Nieuwenhuijzen emigrated to Canada and co-founded Dutch Connections FC, a Toronto-based soccer development and services organization affiliated with Feyenoord. The club focuses on youth training, talent development, and fostering international football partnerships.

In 2019, he founded a Toronto-based international sports consulting and investment firm. He later launched FANCAP, a Toronto-Amsterdam based sports investment, advisory & consulting firm, and established an M&A Advisory Division in partnership with Sports Entertainment Group (SEG), providing merger and acquisition advisory services in sports and entertainment. Through this division, van Nieuwenhuijzen structures sports-related investment vehicles, including public-private partnerships and transatlantic club investments.

== Honours ==
Club

RBC Roosendaal

• Play off winners first division 1999-2000

Excelsior

• Play off winners first division 2001-2002

• Champions First Division 2005-2006
