= ProStars FC =

Canadian soccer team

- Full name: Prostars FC
- Nickname: PFC
- Founded: 2013
- Stadium: Victoria Park Stadium
- Capacity: 2,000
- Coach: Sam Medeiros (men); Josef Komlodi (women)
- 2024: L1O-P, 10th (men); L1O-C, 4th (women)
- Website: www.prostarsfc.com
Home colours	Away colours	Third colours

Prostars FC is a Canadian soccer team based in Brampton, Ontario. The organization was founded in 2013. The club previously played in the semi-professional League1 Ontario, part of the third division in the Canadian soccer league system in both the men's and women's divisions. The team play their home games at Victoria Park Stadium in Brampton, Ontario. The team's colours are blue for home games and white for away games.

== History ==
ProStars FC was founded as Pro Stars Soccer Academy in 2013. The key philosophy for ProStars is to develop, teach and promote Academy and Professional soccer to all ages, in a safe and healthy environment. Integrated in this is the building of self-esteem, self-confidence, teamwork, respect for self and others, and the inherent benefits of physical exercise.

Successes of the academy did not go unnoticed as a steady stream of players were invited to try-outs for professional soccer teams in Europe.

They added teams in the men's and women's divisions of League1 Ontario in 2015. They departed the women's division after only one season, but re-joined for the 2022 season.

The three Mississauga-based League1 Ontario teams—ProStars FC, Sigma FC, and North Mississauga SC—compete annually for the Credit River Cup, awarded by the Sauga City Collective supporters group, with the team's matches against each other during the L1O deciding the victor. However, in 2021, ProStars committed to having their home in Brampton, they were removed from the Credit River Cup. They returned to the competition in 2022, winning their first Credit River Cup that season. They also qualified for the League1 Ontario playoffs for the first time in 2022.

In September 2023, the club partnered with Milton Youth Soccer Club (who were previously affiliated with Scrosoppi FC) to co-ordinate their women's team, including player registration, management, and gameday operations, also providing opportunities for male players from Milton to trial with the men's team. After the 2024 season, ProStars withdrew from both the men's and women's divisions of League1 Ontario. In March 2025, ProStars, alongside Milton YSC, were announced as new affiliate clubs for Burlington SC, allowing their players to play for Burlington's League1 Ontario teams.

== Seasons ==
Men

Season	League	Teams	Record	Rank	Playoffs	League Cup	Ref
2015	League1 Ontario	12	4–3–15	10th	–	Quarter-finals	
2016	League1 Ontario	16	4–3–15	8th, Western (13th overall)	did not qualify	Round of 16	
2017	League1 Ontario	16	1–1–20	8th, Western (16th overall)	did not qualify	Round of 16	
2018	League1 Ontario	17	2–4–10	16th	did not qualify	Quarter-finals	
2019	League1 Ontario	16	5–2–8	11th	did not qualify	–	
2020	League1 Ontario	Season cancelled due to COVID-19 pandemic					
2021	League1 Ontario	15	4–2–6	6th, West (10th overall)	did not qualify	–	
2022	League1 Ontario	22	14–1–6	6th	Quarter-finals	–	
2023	League1 Ontario	21	5–4–11	18th	did not qualify	–	
2024	League1 Ontario Premier	12	7–3–12	10th	–	Round of 32	

Women

Season	League	Teams	Record	Rank	Playoffs	League Cup	Ref
2015	League1 Ontario	7	2–3–13	7th	–	Group stage	
2016–2021	on hiatus						
2022	League1 Ontario	20	1–3–15	19th	Did not qualify	–	
2023	League1 Ontario	19	0–1–17	19th	Did not qualify	–	
2024	League1 Ontario Championship	10	9–3–6	4th	–	Round of 32	

== Notable former players ==
The following players have either played at the professional or international level, either before or after playing for the League1 Ontario team:

=== Men ===
- (Bulgaria) Kiril Dimitrov
- (Canada) Duwayne Ewart
- (Canada) Victor Gallo
- (Canada) Taha Ilyass
- (Iraq) Ameer Kinani
- (Canada) Jevontae Layne
- (Canada) Reshon Phillip
- (Pakistan) Navid Rahman
- (Jamaica) Camaal Reid
- (Grenada) Rickey Sayers
- (Canada) David Velastegui
- (Ukraine) Markiyan Voytsekhovskyy
- (Canada) Jordan Webb

=== Women ===
- (Guyana) (Canada) Dana Bally
- (Saint Kitts and Nevis) (Canada) Kyra Dickinson
- (Israel) (Canada) Vital Kats
- (Croatia) (Canada) Martina Lončar
- (Jamaica) (Canada) Oshay Nelson-Lawes
- (Guyana) (Canada) Gabriella Salvadore
- (Guyana) (Canada) Ashlee Savona
