= Shaquille Agard =

Guyanese footballer (born 1993)

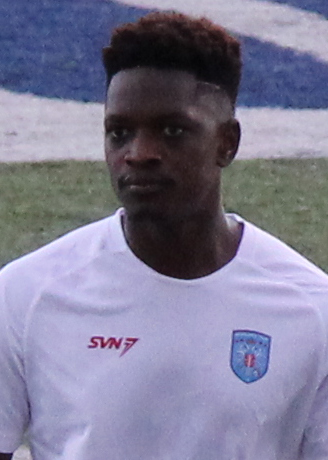
- Agard in 2022

Personal information
- Full name: Shaquille Agard
- Date of birth: December 7, 1993 (age 32)
- Place of birth: Georgetown, Guyana
- Height: 6 ft 0 in (1.83 m)
- Position: Forward

Team information
- Current team: Serbian White Eagles
- Number: 20

Youth career
- Wexford SC
- North Scarborough SC

College career
Years	Team	Apps	(Gls)
2013–2015	Centennial Colts	14	(5)
2016–2018	George Brown Huskies	26	(13)

Senior career*
Years	Team	Apps	(Gls)
2014	Durham United		
2015–2016	Fruta Conquerors	7	(5)
2016	Durham United	12	(3)
2018–2019	Caribbean Stars AC (indoor)		
2018–2019	Mississauga MetroStars (indoor)	11	(6)
2019–2022	Master's FA	29	(9)
2022–	Serbian White Eagles		

International career^{‡}
2014–2017	Guyana	5	(1)
- * Club domestic league appearances and goals as of August 21, 2022 ‡ National team caps and goals as of December 31, 2021

Shaquille Agard (born December 7, 1993) is a Guyanese soccer player who plays as a forward for Canadian Soccer League club Serbian White Eagles FC.

== College career ==
He began playing for the Centennial Colts.

In 2016, Agard began playing for the George Brown Huskies. In his first year, he scored nine goals to help them to a provincial bronze medal and also helped the Huskies win the OCAA indoor championship, being named indoor MVP as well as the George Brown Male Athlete of the Year. He was a three time Ontario Colleges Athletic Association all-star from 2016 to 2018.

== Club career ==
In 2014, Agard played in League1 Ontario with Durham United FC.

In 2015, he began playing for the Guyanese club Fruta Conquerors FC in the GFF Elite League, where he scored five goals in seven games, before having to leave the club due to issues with his transfer.

In 2016, he returned to play for Durham, scoring three scores in 12 appearances.

In the 2018–19 season, he played indoor with the Mississauga MetroStars of the Major Arena Soccer League. Initially, he played indoor soccer in the Mississauga-based Arena Premier League with the Caribbean Stars AC.

In 2019, he played for Master's FA in League1 Ontario, scoring five goals in 11 games and was named a league Third Team All-Star. In 2021, he scored three goals in 9 league games, was named an East Division All-Star, and also appeared in a Canadian Championship match against professional side York United FC.

In March 2022, it was announced that he was joining the Serbian White Eagles of the Canadian Soccer League, however, he ultimately remained with Master's FA. He debuted for the Serbian White Eagles on June 18, 2022, in a 7–3 win over BGHC 1. He resumed playing with Serbia and helped the club win the regular season title. Agard played in the second round of the playoffs, where FC Continentals eliminated the Serbs from the tournament.

== International career ==
In 2014, he made his debut for the Guyana national team at the 2014 Caribbean Cup qualification. He made five appearances between 2014 and 2017. He scored a goal on November 25, 2017, in a friendly against Indonesia.

== Honors ==
Serbian White Eagles

- Canadian Soccer League Regular Season: 2022
