= David Velastegui =

Canadian soccer player (born 1991)

Personal information
- Full name: David Velastegui
- Date of birth: April 1, 1991 (age 35)
- Place of birth: Mississauga, Ontario, Canada
- Height: 1.78 m (5 ft 10 in)
- Position: Midfielder

College career
| Years | Team | Apps | (Gls) |
| 2009–2013 | Sheridan Bruins | | (27) |

Senior career*
| Years | Team | Apps | (Gls) |
| 2012 | Brampton United | | |
| 2013 | Club Sport Colombia | | |
| 2013–2014 | Toronto Croatia | | |
| 2015–2016 | Atlético San Cristóbal | 14 | (7) |
| 2016 | Delfines del Este | 8 | (1) |
| 2017–2018 | Sigma FC | 18 | (7) |
| 2018–2019 | Mississauga MetroStars (indoor) | 14 | (2) |
| 2019 | Vaughan Azzurri | 9 | (2) |
| 2019 | FC Ukraine United | | |
| 2020 | Atlético San Cristóbal | 8 | (3) |
| 2021 | Scrosoppi FC | 6 | (0) |
| 2021–2022 | Blue Devils FC | 16 | (2) |
| 2023 | ProStars FC | 6 | (0) |

International career
| 2006 | Canada U15 | 3 | (2) |
- * Club domestic league appearances and goals as of August 5, 2023

David Velastegui (born April 1, 1991) is a Canadian soccer player. He plays as a midfielder.

== Club career ==
Velastegui signed with Brampton United in the Canadian Soccer League (CSL), he was a regular starter playing in all 23 match fixtures and being recognized as one of the top young talents of the league. David spent four years at Sheridan College, where he captained the team to win its first ever Canadian National Championship and received the CCAA All-Canadian award, being recognized as the top player in the country. In 2013, he joined Club Sport Colombia in the Paraguayan second tier for a short period, leaving the club due to the club’s limited financial resources and returning to Sheridan. While his time at Sheridan during the off season he continued playing in the Canadian Soccer League with Toronto Croatia where they were CSL Championship finalists in 2014.

Velastegui was then signed by San Cristóbal in the Liga Dominicana de Fútbol. David quickly made an impact scoring on his debut and lead his team in goals becoming 4th overall Top Goalscorer of the league with 7 goals. He was signed mid-season by another Dominican team, Delfines del Este FC and scored in his club debut against Cibao FC on May 13, 2016.

In 2019, he played with Vaughan Azzurri in League1 Ontario, and for the remainder of the season returned to the CSL to play with FC Ukraine United. He also featured in the 2019 Canadian Championship against HFX Wanderers FC. During his tenure with Ukraine United he featured in the CSL Championship final once more against Scarborough SC. In 2020, he returned to his former Dominican club San Cristóbal.

Velastegui signed for MASL club Mississauga MetroStars ahead of their inaugural season.

In 2021, he began the season playing for Scrosoppi FC in League1 Ontario, before switching to Blue Devils FC in the same league in September, where he remained for 2022.

In 2023, he joined ProStars FC.

== International career ==
Velastegui was born in Canada and is of Ecuadorian descent. He was 15 years old when he made his debut in the Canadian youth program in 2006 in a pair of friendlies against the United States youth U-15 national team and IMG Academy under coach Sean Fleming in Bradenton, Florida.
