= 2020 League1 Ontario season =

League1 Ontario Men's Division
- Season: 2020
- Dates: April 24 – September 12 (Cancelled)

The 2020 Men's League1 Ontario season would have been the seventh season of play for League1 Ontario (L1O), a Division 3 men's soccer league in the Canadian soccer pyramid and the highest level of soccer based in the Canadian province of Ontario.

For the first time this year, the league's entry in the 2021 Canadian Championship, the top national tournament for men's soccer teams, was to be determined by a "Champions Final", to be played between the regular season champions and the playoff champions.

On March 20, 2020, L1O postponed the start of the season due to the COVID-19 pandemic. On June 6, 2020, the league announced the cancellation of the "summer season" while also mentioning the possibility of returning in September 2020 for a shortened "fall season", though this was later ruled out.

== Format ==
For the regular season, each team would have played every other team once for a total of 16 matches. The playoffs would have included the top eight teams, facing each other in a three-round, single leg tournament. The winner of the playoffs would face the winner of the regular season, in a single match named the "Champions Final", that was to determine League1 Ontario's entry in the 2021 Canadian Championship. Due to the cancellation of the season, the 2021 Canadian Championship spot was given to the 2019 league champion, as the 2020 edition was modified to exclude the L1O participant.

The season would have been shorter in duration than previous seasons. It was scheduled to start on April 24, a few weeks earlier than usual, and end with the Playoffs Final on September 5 and the Champions Final on September 12, to allow for University players to take part in the playoffs.

== Clubs ==
The men's division consisted of 17 teams, an increase from 16 teams in 2019. North Toronto Nitros returned from hiatus, joining Hamilton United as the new entries, while Ottawa South United moved to the Première Ligue de soccer du Québec. Durham United FA re-branded as Pickering FC.

The following clubs were set to participate in the league prior to the season's cancellation.

Team	City	Principal stadium
Alliance United FC	Toronto	Centennial College
Aurora FC	Aurora	Stewart Burnett Park
Darby FC	Whitby	Whitby Soccer Centre
Hamilton United	Hamilton	Ron Joyce Stadium & Tim Hortons Field
FC London	London	German Canadian FC Stadium
Master's Futbol	Toronto	L'Amoreaux Park
North Mississauga SC	Mississauga	Paramount Fine Foods Centre
North Toronto Nitros	Toronto	Downsview Turf 1
Oakville Blue Devils	Oakville	Sheridan Trafalgar Stadium
Pickering FC	Pickering	Pickering Soccer Centre & Kinsmen Park
ProStars FC	Brampton	Victoria Park Stadium
Sigma FC	Mississauga	Paramount Fine Foods Centre
Toronto Skillz FC	Toronto	Birchmount Stadium
Unionville Milliken SC	Markham	Azzurri Village
Vaughan Azzurri	Vaughan	North Maple Regional Park
Windsor TFC	Windsor	University of Windsor Stadium
Woodbridge Strikers	Vaughan	Vaughan Grove

== Reserve Division ==
After introducing the Reserve Division during the 2019 season, it was set to be expanded for the 2020 season. All of the clubs in L1O would be required to field a club in the division, while some other Ontario soccer clubs who did not have a team in the league were invited to field teams in the U21 Reserve division.

North	East	Central	Southwest
Aurora FC Reserves A	Alliance United Reserves	Master's FA Reserves B	FC London Reserves
Darby FC Reserves A	Aurora FC Reserves B	North Mississauga Reserves	Hamilton United Reserves
Oakville Blue Devils Reserves A	Darby FC Reserves B	Oakville Blue Devils Reserves B	Oakville SC U21
ProStars FC Reserves A	Master's FC Reserves A	Pickering FC Reserves B	ProStars FC Reserves B
Sigma FC Reserves A	Pickering FC Reserves A	Sigma FC Reserves B	Rush Canada U21
Vaughan Azzurri Reserves	Richmond Hill SC U21	Toronto Skillz FC Reserves	Waterloo United U21
Woodbridge Strikers Reserves A	Unionville Milliken Reserves	Woodbridge Strikers Reserves B	Windsor TFC Reserves
