= Robert Stillo =

Canadian soccer player (born 1991)

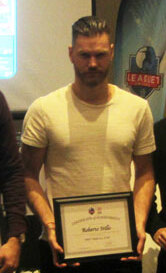
- Stillo in 2018

Personal information
- Full name: Roberto Bruno Stillo
- Date of birth: March 15, 1991 (age 35)
- Place of birth: Mississauga, Ontario, Canada
- Height: 6 ft 2 in (1.88 m)
- Position: Goalkeeper

Youth career
- Erin Mills SC
- 2006–2011: Genoa

Senior career*
Years	Team	Apps	(Gls)
2011–2013	Genoa	0	(0)
2011	→ Valenzana (loan)	3	(0)
2012	→ Paganese (loan)	7	(0)
2013–2014	Parma	0	(0)
2013–2014	→ Perugia (loan)	5	(0)
2017	Sigma FC	1	(0)
2018–2019	Woodbridge Strikers	11	(0)
Total		27	(0)

International career^{‡}
2008–2010	Canada U20	3	(0)

Managerial career
- Sheridan Bruins (goalkeepers)
- 2021–: TMU Bold (goalkeepers)
- * Club domestic league appearances and goals as of September 9, 2018 ‡ National team caps and goals as of February 3, 2015

Roberto Bruno Stillo (born 15 March 1991) is a Canadian former soccer player.

== Early life ==
Stillo began playing youth soccer at age eight with Erin Mills SC and also played for the Ontario provincial team at the U14 and U15 levels. He began playing goalkeeper at age 12. At age 15, he went to Italy where he had trials with the youth systems of Inter Milan and AC Milan, before joining the Genoa academy. in March 2006.

== Club career ==
In July 2008, he signed his first professional contract with Genoa, while continuing to play with the U18 team. In July 2011, he was loaned by Genoa to Valenzana in the fourth tier Lega Pro Seconda Divisione on loan. In January 2012, he was loaned to Paganese in the Lega Pro Seconda Divisione.

In the summer of 2013, he signed with Parma. He subsequently joined Perugia in the third tier Serie C on loan in July 2013. On October 6, 2013, he made his debut for Perugia, as a substitute following a red card to the starting keeper in the 32nd minute against Prato.

In January 2016, he went on trial with Swedish club Jönköpings Södra IF.

In 2017, he played with Sigma FC in League1 Ontario. In 2018 and 2019, he played with the Woodbridge Strikers. In 2018, he was named the league's Goalkeeper of the Year and a First Team All-Star.

== International career ==
In November 2008, he was called up to the Canada U20 for the first time for a camp in Switzerland. On November 26, 2008, he earned his first official cap for the U20 in a friendly against Switzerland U20, after playing in an unofficial match two days earlier against club team BSC Young Boys U21. He played in another friendly in December 2010 against the United States U20.

In January 2013, he was called up for the first time for a pair of friendlies. In May 2014, he was again called up to the senior team.

== Coaching career ==
In 2017, Stillo launched his own goaltending academy called Evolution Goalkeeping.

He became a coach with Sheridan College. In 2021, he became a goalkeeper coach with Toronto Metropolitan University's men's soccer team.
