= The Borough FC =

Soccer club in Scarborough, Ontario

- Full name: The Borough Football Club
- Founded: 2011/2023
- Stadium: Birchmount Stadium
- Capacity: 2,000
- Owner: Dutch Connections FC
- Head coach: Andrew Ornoch
- League: Ontario Premier League 2
- 2025: L1O-C, 3rd
- Website: https://www.theboroughfc.com/

The Borough Football Club is a Canadian soccer club based in Scarborough, Ontario that competes in the men's division of the Ontario Premier League 2. The club was founded by youth club Dutch Connections FC.

== History ==
=== Dutch Connections FC ===
Dutch Connections FC

In 2011, Dutch Connections FC was founded as a youth soccer club by former Canadian national team player Andrew Ornoch and former Dutch player Jörg van Nieuwenhuijzen, who were previously teammates at Dutch club Heracles Almelo. The club has been successful at youth level, winning the 2021 U13 and 2023 U15 Ontario Cup titles. The club has organized several camps with Dutch club Feyenoord's academy.

In October 2023, it was announced that they would field a senior men's team in League2 Ontario as an expansion side in 2024, as well as fielding a team in the reserve division, with the longer-term ambition of creating an L1O women's team. Rob Jenkins, who was previously the Manager of Football Operations for Cavalry FC in the Canadian Premier League between 2018 and 2020 and President of L1O's Electric City FC in the following two years, joined the club as a partner ahead of their League1 Ontario expansion bid. The club wants the team to be more of a community team, rather than just an extension of the youth club team, and decided that they would unveil a new name that the team would operate under rather than the Dutch Connections name.

=== The Borough FC ===
In February 2024, they announced the club would be known as The Borough FC. The club also unveiled their crest which honours its local roots through the inclusion of elements evoking the iconic Scarborough Bluffs, the waters of Lake Ontario, and the Scarborough coat of arms. The club's inaugural match occurred on April 20, 2024, where they defeated League1 Ontario Championship side Pickering FC in a league cup match.

Ahead of the 2025 season, they were promoted to the League1 Ontario Championship, following Vaughan Azzurri B and Alliance United B declined their promotions.

== Seasons ==
Season	League	Teams	Record	Rank	Playoffs	League Cup	Ref
2024	League2 Ontario; Central Conference	8	4–3–7	6th ↑ (Note: The Borough were initially not promoted. However, they were selected to be promoted, after other clubs declined promotion)	–	Round of 16	
2025	League1 Ontario Championship	12	10–10–2	3rd	–	Round of 32	
