= Master's FA =

Canadian semi-professional soccer club

Master's Futbol
- Full name: Master's Futbol Academy
- Nickname: Saints
- Founded: 2009; 17 years ago
- Stadium: L'Amoreaux Park; Scarborough, Toronto, Ontario
- Owner: Junior Groves
- Head Coach: Giuseppe Mattace-Raso
- League: League1 Ontario
- 2025: L1O-C, 6th (men); L2O, 12th (women)
- Website: www.mfasoccer.ca

Master's Futbol Academy, commonly known as Master's FA, is a Canadian semi-professional soccer club based in Scarborough, Toronto, Ontario. The club was founded in 2009 as a soccer academy and added its team in the semi-professional League1 Ontario, the third tier in the Canadian soccer league system.

The club was one of the ten original founding men's teams in League1 Ontario, which was established in 2014. Their team initially competed under the name Master's FA Saints.

== History ==
In 2009, Master's Futbol Academy was founded by Junior Groves. In 2014, the semi-professional club was established to play in the newly formed League1 Ontario as one of the founding members. They were one of the three Ontario Soccer Association Recognized Non-Club Academies permitted to enter a team in the league, along with ANB Futbol and Sigma FC. The club played their debut match on May 31, 2014 against the Cataraqui Clippers, winning 3–0. In their inaugural season, they finished in seventh place.

Their most successful season came in 2019, when they won the 2019 League1 Ontario playoffs, defeating FC London 4–1 in the finals. This victory qualified the club for the Canadian Championship for the first time in 2020. However, due to the COVID-19 pandemic, their participation was shifted to the 2021 Canadian Championship. In the match in 2021, they were defeated by Canadian Premier League club York United FC in the preliminary round by a score of 5–0.

== Seasons ==
=== Men ===
Season	League	Teams	Record	Rank	Playoffs	League Cup	Canadian Championship	Ref
2014	League1 Ontario	9	5–2–9	7th	–	Group stage	Not eligible	
2015	League1 Ontario	12	1–3–18	12th	–	Group stage	Not eligible	
2016	League1 Ontario	16	3–2–17	8th, Eastern (16th overall)	did not qualify	Runner-up	Not eligible	
2017	League1 Ontario	16	9–3–10	5th, Eastern (9th overall)	did not qualify	Quarter-finals	Not eligible	
2018	League1 Ontario	17	4–7–5	10th	did not qualify	Quarter-finals	did not qualify	
2019	League1 Ontario	16	9–3–3	4th	Champions	–	did not qualify	
2020	League1 Ontario	Season cancelled due to COVID-19 pandemic					Moved to 2021	
2021	League1 Ontario	15	6–3–3	2nd, East (5th overall)	Semi-finals	–	Preliminary Round	
2022	League1 Ontario	22	4–5–12	19th	did not qualify	–	did not qualify	
2023	League1 Ontario	21	4–2–14	19th	did not qualify	–	did not qualify	
2024	League1 Ontario Championship	10	5–4–9	5th	–	Quarter-Finals	did not qualify	
2025	League1 Ontario Championship	12	9–7–6	6th	–	Round of 32	did not qualify	

=== Women ===
Season	League	Teams	Record	Rank	Playoffs	League Cup	Ref
2024	League2 Ontario Northeast	10	0–2–12	10th	–	Round of 32	
2025	League2 Ontario Northeast	12	1–2–11	12th	–	Round of 32	

== Notable former players ==
The following players have either played at the professional or international level, either before or after playing for the League1 Ontario team:

- (Guyana) Shaquille Agard
- (Jamaica) Shawn Brown
- (Bulgaria) Kiril Dimitrov
- (Jamaica) Richard Edwards
- (Saint Lucia) Sherwin Emmanuel
- (Canada) Sam Gardner
- (Canada) Evan James
- (Canada) Levonte Johnson
- (Jamaica) Allando Matheson
- (Canada) Joey Melo
- (Cayman Islands) Anton Nelson
- (Canada) Jaime Peters
- (Canada) Reshon Phillip
- (Jamaica) Akeem Priestley
- (Antigua and Barbuda) Tyrell Rayne
- (England) Rohan Ricketts
- (Canada) Cyrus Rollocks
- (Cayman Islands) Elijah Seymour
- (Canada) C. J. Smith
- (Canada) Reshaun Walkes

== Honours ==
- League1 Ontario
  - Championship (1): 2019
