= 2023 HFX Wanderers FC season =

Halifax Wanderers
2023 season
- President: Derek Martin
- Head coach: Patrice Gheisar
- Stadium: Wanderers Grounds
- Canadian Championship: First round
- Top goalscorer: League: Massimo Ferrin (8); All: Massimo Ferrin (9)
- Highest home attendance: 6,413
- Lowest home attendance: 4,907
- Average home league attendance: 5,854
- Biggest win: 3-0 vs. Vancouver, 12 August
- Biggest defeat: 0-3 vs. York United, 20 May
Home colours	Away colours

The 2023 HFX Wanderers FC season was the fifth season in the history of HFX Wanderers FC. In addition to the Canadian Premier League, the club competed in the Canadian Championship.

This was the club's first season led by Patrice Gheisar, who was announced as the club's new head coach on November 30, 2022. After finishing the season in third place, the Wanderers qualified to host their first home playoff game at the Wanderers Grounds in club history, which they lost 0-1 to Pacific FC on October 14, 2023.

== Squad ==
As of September 7, 2023

No.	Player	Nationality	Position(s)	Date of birth (age)	Previous club
Goalkeepers
1	Yann-Alexandre Fillion	(Canada)	GK	February 14, 1996 (aged 27)	(Finland) IFK Mariehamn
66	Aiden Rushenas	(Canada)	GK	May 23, 2003 (aged 20)	(Canada) Dalhousie Tigers
Defenders
2	Daniel Nimick	(Canada)	CB	September 22, 2000 (aged 23)	(United States) Western Michigan Broncos
3	Zachary Fernandez	(Canada)	RB	September 24, 2001 (aged 22)	(Canada) A.S. Blainville
4	Cristian Campagna	(Canada)	CB	November 29, 2001 (aged 22)	(Canada) Whitecaps FC 2
5	Cale Loughrey	(Canada)	CB	August 4, 2001 (aged 22)	(Canada) FC Edmonton
7	Ryan James	(Canada)	LB	April 21, 1994 (aged 29)	(United States) Birmingham Legion
15	Doneil Henry	(Canada)	CB	April 20, 1993 (aged 30)	(United States) Minnesota United
20	Jake Ruby	(Canada)	RB	June 4, 2000 (aged 23)	(Canada) Trinity Western Spartans
22	Mohamed Omar	(Canada)	CB / CM / DM	January 22, 1999 (aged 24)	(United States) Notre Dame Fighting Irish
23	Riley Ferrazzo	(Canada)	FB	August 4, 1999 (aged 24)	(Canada) Vaughan Azzurri
	Yorgos Gavas	(Canada)	CB		(Canada) Whitecaps FC Academy
Midfielders
6	Lorenzo Callegari	(France)	CM	February 27, 1998 (aged 25)	(France) Chambly
10	Aidan Daniels	(Canada)	AM	September 6, 1998 (aged 25)	(United States) OKC Energy
11	João Morelli	(Brazil)	AM / CF	March 11, 1996 (aged 27)	(Estonia) FCI Levadia
13	Armaan Wilson	(Canada)	DM / CM	May 29, 2002 (aged 21)	(United States) Providence Friars
14	Callum Watson	(England)	CM	February 28, 2000 (aged 23)	(United States) Creighton Bluejays
17	Wesley Timoteo	(Canada)	RW / LW / FB	April 9, 2000 (aged 23)	(Canada) FC Edmonton
18	Andre Rampersad	(Trinidad and Tobago)	CM	February 2, 1995 (aged 28)	(Trinidad and Tobago) Santa Rosa
24	Tomas Giraldo	(Canada)	AM / CM	March 8, 2003 (aged 20)	(Canada) CF Montréal
37	Lifumpa Mwandwe	(England)	RW / LW / CF	December 29, 2000 (aged 23)	(Wales) Newtown
	Camilo Vasconcelos	(Canada)	AM	March 19, 2005 (aged 18)	(Canada) Guelph United
Forwards
8	Massimo Ferrin	(Canada)	CF / RW / LW	December 6, 1998 (aged 25)	(Canada) Vaughan Azzurri
9	Théo Collomb	(France)	CF	July 11, 2000 (aged 23)	(Canada) Whitecaps FC 2
19	Tiago Coimbra	(Canada)	CF	January 17, 2004 (aged 19)	(Brazil) Palmeiras
21	Jordan Perruzza	(Canada)	FW	January 16, 2001 (aged 22)	(Canada) Toronto FC

== Transfers ==
=== In ===
No.	Pos.	Player	From club	Fee/notes	Date	Source
17	MF	(Canada) Wesley Timoteo	(Canada) FC Edmonton	Return from loan	November 30, 2022	
	DF	(Democratic Republic of the Congo) Ousman Maheshe	(Canada) FC Edmonton	Return from loan	November 30, 2022	
	MF	(Canada) CJ Smith	(Canada) FC Edmonton	Return from loan	November 30, 2022	
19	FW	(Canada) Tiago Coimbra	(Brazil) Palmeiras	Free	December 14, 2022	
8	FW	(Canada) Massimo Ferrin	(Canada) Vaughan Azzurri	Free	December 21, 2022	
6	MF	(France) Lorenzo Callegari	(France) Chambly	Free	January 10, 2023	
1	GK	(Canada) Yann-Alexandre Fillion	(Finland) IFK Mariehamn	Free	January 18, 2023	
23	DF	(Canada) Riley Ferrazzo	(Canada) Vaughan Azzurri	Free	January 20, 2023	
14	MF	(England) Callum Watson	(United States) Creighton Bluejays	Free	January 25, 2023	
5	DF	(Canada) Cale Loughrey	(Canada) Forge FC	Free	February 1, 2023	
24	MF	(Canada) Tomas Giraldo	(Canada) CF Montréal	Free	February 3, 2023	
9	FW	(France) Théo Collomb	(Canada) Whitecaps FC 2	Free	February 8, 2023	
7	DF	(Canada) Ryan James	(United States) Birmingham Legion	Free	February 15, 2023	
2	DF	(Canada) Daniel Nimick	(United States) Western Michigan Broncos	Free	February 17, 2023	
13	MF	(Canada) Armaan Wilson	(United States) Providence Friars	Free	February 22, 2023	
11	FW	(Nigeria) Kosi Nwafornso	(Canada) Vaughan Azzurri	Free	February 24, 2023	
	DF	(United States) Ethan Schilte-Brown		Signed to a development contract	March 12, 2023	
	FW	(Saint Vincent and the Grenadines) Kimani Stewart-Baynes	(Canada) Vaughan Azzurri U19	Signed to a development contract	March 12, 2023	
66	GK	(Canada) Aiden Rushenas	(Canada) Dalhousie Tigers	Selected 10th overall in the 2023 CPL–U Sports Draft	April 5, 2023	
15	DF	(Canada) Doneil Henry	(United States) Minnesota United	Free	July 18, 2023	
	DF	(Canada) Yorgos Gavas	(Canada) Whitecaps FC Academy	Signed to a development contract	August 3, 2023	
	MF	(Canada) Camilo Vasconcelos	(Canada) Guelph United	Signed to a development contract	September 7, 2023	

==== Loans in ====
No.	Pos.	Player	Loaned from	Fee/notes	Date	Source
21	FW	(Canada) Jordan Perruzza	(Canada) Toronto FC	Loaned until end of season	August 7, 2023	

==== Draft picks ====
HFX Wanderers selected the following players in the 2023 CPL–U Sports Draft. Draft picks are not automatically signed to the team roster. Only those who are signed to a contract will be listed as transfers in.

Round	Selection	Pos.	Player	Nationality	University
1	3	DF	Anthony Stolar	Canada	Cape Breton
2	10	GK	Aiden Rushenas	Canada	Dalhousie

=== Out ===
No.	Pos.	Player	To club	Fee/notes	Date	Source
11	FW	(Trinidad and Tobago) Akeem Garcia	Retired		October 28, 2022	
1	GK	(Canada) Kieran Baskett	(Canada) Pacific FC	Option declined	December 6, 2022	
50	GK	(Canada) Christian Oxner		Option declined	December 6, 2022	
2	DF	(Germany) Peter Schaale		Option declined	December 6, 2022	
19	DF	(Canada) Obeng Tabi	(Canada) CS Saint-Laurent	Option declined	December 6, 2022	
31	DF	(Brazil) Eriks Santos		Option declined	December 6, 2022	
28	MF	(Canada) Jérémy Gagnon-Laparé	(Canada) York United	Option declined	December 6, 2022	
7	FW	(Jamaica) Alex Marshall		Option declined	December 6, 2022	
8	FW	(Senegal) Elhadji Mour Samb		Option declined	December 6, 2022	
5	MF	(Canada) Pierre Lamothe	(Canada) Pacific FC	Contract expired	December 6, 2022	
21	MF	(Canada) Marcello Polisi	(Canada) Valour FC	Contract expired	December 6, 2022	
23	FW	(England) Cory Bent		Contract expired	December 6, 2022	
	DF	(Democratic Republic of the Congo) Ousman Maheshe		Contract expired	December 31, 2022	
	MF	(Canada) CJ Smith	(Canada) Vaughan Azzurri	Contract expired	December 31, 2022	
9	FW	(Canada) Samuel Salter	(Canada) Atlético Ottawa	Undisclosed fee & sell-on clause	February 16, 2023	
	DF	(United States) Ethan Schilte-Brown		Development contract ended	June 13, 2023	
11	FW	(Nigeria) Kosi Nwafornso		Contract terminated by mutual consent	June 13, 2023	
	FW	(Saint Vincent and the Grenadines) Kimani Stewart-Baynes		Development contract ended	July 5, 2023	
25	FW	(Denmark) Ludwig Kodjo Amla		Suspended for anti-doping violation	August 2, 2023	

==== Loans out ====
No.	Pos.	Player	Loaned to	Fee/notes	Date	Source
37	MF	(England) Lifumpa Mwandwe	(Wales) Newtown	Loaned until February 28, 2023	January 3, 2023	

== Pre-season ==
The Halifax Wanderers began their pre-season on March 1 in Halifax before traveling to Auburndale, Florida, where they practiced at the Lake Myrtle Sports Park. While in Florida, games were played against Montverde Academy, Stetson University, Inter Miami CF II, and the University of South Florida.

Upon return to Halifax, a series of pre-season friendlies were held April 7 and 8 on Wickwire Field at Dalhousie University, which were open for fans to attend. The visiting teams were the Nepean Hotspurs Ottawa Selects, and Electric City FC.

== Competitions ==
Matches are listed in Halifax local time: Atlantic Daylight Time (UTC−3)

=== Overview ===
Competition	First match	Last match	Starting round	Record							
Competition	First match	Last match	Starting round	Pld	W	D	L	GF	GA	GD	Win %
Canadian Premier League	April 15	October 6	Matchday 1	9	1	6	2	8	11	−3	11.11
Canadian Championship	April 19	April 19	First round	1	0	0	1	1	3	−2	0.00
Total				10	1	6	3	9	14	−5	10.00

Last updated: 13 June, 2023
Source: Competitions

=== Canadian Premier League ===
==== Table ====
Pos	Team	Pld	W	D	L	GF	GA	GD	Pts	Playoff qualification
1	Cavalry (S)	28	16	7	5	46	27	+19	55	First semifinal
2	Forge (C)	28	11	9	8	39	32	+7	42 (Note: Tie resolved by away goal differential; Forge: +4, Wanderers: −2)	First semifinal
3	HFX Wanderers	28	11	9	8	39	32	+7	42	Quarterfinal
4	Pacific	28	11	7	10	42	35	+7	40	Play-in round
5	York United	28	11	5	12	35	44	−9	38	Play-in round
6	Atlético Ottawa	28	10	6	12	38	34	+4	36	
7	Vancouver	28	8	5	15	28	50	−22	29	
8	Valour	28	6	8	14	25	38	−13	26	

Source: CanPL
Rules for classification: 1) Points; 2) Total wins; 3) Goal difference; 4) Goals scored; 5) Away goal differential; 6) Away goals scored; 7) Home goal differential; 8) Home goals scored; 9) Total minutes played by U-21 players; 10) Coin toss (2 teams tied) or drawing of lots (3+ teams tied).
(C) Champion (qualified to Champions Cup); (S) CPL Shield winner (qualified to Champions Cup)

==== Results by match ====
Match	1	2	3	4	5	6	7	8	9	10	11	12	13	14	15	16	17	18	19	20	21	22	23	24	25	26	27	28
Result	D	D	D	D	D	L	D	L	W	W	D	W	L	W	L	W	W	L	W	D	W	L	D	L	W	L	W	W
Position	5	6	7	6	7	8	7	8	6	6	4	5	5	5	6	5	4	6	5	5	4	6	4	6	4	4	4	3

Updated to match(es) played on 20 October, 2023. Source: #Matches
W = Win; D = Draw; L = Loss

==== Matches ====
15 April 2023 1	Atlético Ottawa	1–1	Halifax Wanderers	Ottawa, Ontario
14:00	Acosta (yellow card) 32'; Bassett 45+2'; Sacko (yellow card) 90+4'	Report	Fernandez 16'; Omar (yellow card) 59'; Watson (yellow card) 76'	Stadium: TD Place Stadium; Attendance: 7,039; Referee: Michael Venne

22 April 2023 2	Forge FC	1–1	Halifax Wanderers	Hamilton, Ontario
17:00	James (yellow card) 77'; Pacius 89'	Report	Ferrin 42'; Callegari (yellow card) 49'; Nimick (yellow card) 74'; Ferrazzo (yellow card) 88'	Stadium: Tim Hortons Field; Attendance: 3,827; Referee: Fabrizio Stasolla

29 April 2023 3	Halifax Wanderers	1–1	Vancouver FC	Halifax, Nova Scotia
15:00	Collomb 12'; Ferrazzo (yellow card) 41'; Callegari (yellow card) 57'; Fernandez (yellow card) 89'	Report	Martínez (yellow card) 40'; Hundal 45+2'; Zadeh (yellow card) 53'	Stadium: Wanderers Grounds; Attendance: 6,413; Referee: Marie-Soleil Beaudoin

6 May 2023 4	Valour FC	0–0	Halifax Wanderers	Winnipeg, Manitoba
17:00	Samaké (yellow card) 90+1'; Gutiérrez (yellow card) 90+4'	Report	Collomb (yellow card) 49'; Fernandez (yellow card) 90+1'; Lorenzo Callegari (yellow card) 90+3'	Stadium: IG Field; Attendance: 2,665; Referee: Carly Shaw-MacLaren

13 May 2023 5	Cavalry FC	2–2	Halifax Wanderers	Calgary, Alberta
20:00	Musse 19'; Bevan 78' (pen.); Bevan (yellow card) 81'; Musse (yellow card) 82'	Report	Callegari (yellow card) 20'; Collomb 45+1'; Fernandez 45+3'; Omar (yellow card) 71'; Fillion (yellow card) 81'; Campagna (yellow card) 87'	Stadium: ATCO Field; Attendance: 3,546; Referee: Fabrizio Stasolla

20 May 2023 6	Halifax Wanderers	0–3	York United	Halifax, Nova Scotia
15:00	Ferrin (yellow card) 67'; Ferrazzo (yellow card) 90+2'	Report	Baldisimo 11'; Baldisimo (yellow card) 23'; Alou 31'; Soumaoro 46'	Stadium: Wanderers Grounds; Attendance: 6,244; Referee: Renzo Villanueva

27 May 2023 7	Pacific FC	1–1	Halifax Wanderers	Langford, British Columbia
11:00	Reid 32'; Vliet (yellow card) 64'	Report	Daniels 84'	Stadium: Starlight Stadium; Attendance: 2,741; Referee: Alain Ruch

3 June 2023 8	Atlético Ottawa	2–0	Halifax Wanderers	Ottawa, Ontario
20:00	Singh (yellow card) 52'; Bassett 71'; Shaw 76'	Report	Loughrey (yellow card) 23'; Ferrazzo (yellow card) 34'; Fernandez (yellow card) 82'	Stadium: TD Place Stadium; Referee: Marie-Soleil Beaudoin

10 June 2023 9	Halifax Wanderers	2–0	Valour FC	Halifax, Nova Scotia
14:00	Watson 9'; Callegari (yellow card) 43'; Watson 52'; Fernandez (yellow card) 76'	Report	Gutiérrez (yellow card) 22'; Polisi (yellow card) 30'; Williams (yellow card) 63'; Samaké (yellow card) 64'	Stadium: Wanderers Grounds; Attendance: 5,524; Referee: Carly Shaw-MacLaren

17 June 2023 10	Halifax Wanderers	3–1	Cavalry FC	Halifax, Nova Scotia
15:00	Coimbra 6'; Callegari (yellow card) 12'; Campagna (yellow card) 54'; Watson (yellow card) 59'; Daniels 62'; Collomb 84'	Report	Bevan 8' (pen.); Ntignee (yellow card) 38'; Trafford (yellow card) 40'; Alarcón (yellow card) 74'	Stadium: Wanderers Grounds; Attendance: 6,019; Referee: Michael Venne

21 June 2023 11	York United	2–2	Halifax Wanderers	Toronto, Ontario
20:00	Babouli 14'; Gee (yellow card) 43'; Santos 56'; Santos (yellow card) 57'; Gagnon-Laparé (yellow card) 90+7'	Report	Daniels (yellow card) 31'; Coimbra 35'; Coimbra (yellow card) 48'; Daniels 86'; Campagna (yellow card) 90+4'; Nimick (yellow card) 90+6'; Callegari (yellow card) 90+7'	Stadium: York Lions Stadium; Attendance: 1,013; Referee: Fabrizio Stasolla

30 June 2023 12	Halifax Wanderers	2–1	Forge FC	Halifax, Nova Scotia
19:00	Ferrin 25'; Timoteo (yellow card) 35'; Giraldo (yellow card) 46'; Loughrey (yellow card) 86'; Nimick 90+10' (pen.)	Report	Owolabi-Belewu (yellow card) 61'; Poku (yellow card) 72'; Bekker 88'; Henry (yellow card) 90+8'; Samuel (yellow card) 90+11'	Stadium: Wanderers Grounds; Attendance: 6,145; Referee: Marie-Soleil Beaudoin

7 July 2023 13	Vancouver FC	2–1	Halifax Wanderers	Langley, British Columbia
11:00	Bitar 10'; Cantave 56'; Bitar (yellow card) 70'; White (yellow card) 73'	Report	Coimbra 11'; Daniels (yellow card) 35'; Campagna (yellow card) 68'; Omar (yellow card) 73'	Stadium: Willoughby Community Park Stadium; Attendance: 2,321; Referee: Robert D'Alesio

11 July 2023 14	Halifax Wanderers	2–1	Pacific FC	Halifax, Nova Scotia
20:00	Ferrin 16'; Watson 49'; Fernandez (yellow card) 56'; Fillion (yellow card) 79'; Nimick (yellow card) 90+2'	Report	Young (yellow card) 56' (yellow-red card) 56'; Kunle Dada-Luke (yellow card) 59'; Đidić 87'; Lamothe (yellow card) 90+4'	Stadium: Wanderers Grounds; Attendance: 5,255; Referee: David Barrie
Note: Game originally scheduled for 19:00, postponed one hour due to excessive rain and flooding.

15 July 2023 15	Cavalry FC	1–0	Halifax Wanderers	Calgary, Alberta
17:00	Nimick 90+1' (o.g.); Ntignee (yellow card) 90+3'	Report	Rampersad (yellow card) 84'	Stadium: ATCO Field; Attendance: 3,867; Referee: Alain Ruch

23 July 2023 16	Halifax Wanderers	1–0	Atlético Ottawa	Halifax, Nova Scotia
17:00	Collomb 24'	Report	Haworth (yellow card) 54'; Ouimette (yellow card) 71'	Stadium: Wanderers Grounds; Attendance: 5,884; Referee: Sebastian Noshinravan
Note: Game originally scheduled for 22 July, postponed one day due to excessive rain and flooding.

30 July 2023 17	York United	0–2	Halifax Wanderers	Toronto, Ontario
15:00	Ferrari (yellow card) 49'; Ricci (yellow card) 60'; Baldisimo (yellow card) 90+2' (yellow-red card) 90+3'; dos Santos (yellow card) 90+5'; Thompson (yellow card) 90+7'; Giantsopoulos (yellow card) 90+7'	Report	Fernandez 45'; Morelli 61'; Coimbra (yellow card) 90+6'	Stadium: York Lions Stadium; Attendance: N/R; Referee: Scott Bowman

7 August 2023 18	Halifax Wanderers	1–2	Pacific FC	Halifax, Nova Scotia
15:00	Loughrey (yellow card) 22'; Ferrin (yellow card) 44'; Morelli (yellow card) 46'; Nimick 79'	Report	Heard (yellow card) 25'; Meilleur-Giguère 45+2'; Heard 54'; Toussaint (yellow card) 83'; Yeates (yellow card) 90+8'	Stadium: Wanderers Grounds; Attendance: 6,254; Referee: Yusri Rudolf

12 August 2023 19	Halifax Wanderers	3–0	Vancouver FC	Halifax, Nova Scotia
16:00	Morelli 5'; Morelli 58' (pen.); Rampersad (yellow card) 61'; Ferrin 66'; Ferrazzo (yellow card) 68'	Report	Bitar (yellow card) 58'	Stadium: Wanderers Grounds; Attendance: 6,254; Referee: Ben Hoskins

19 August 2023 20	Forge FC	1–1	Halifax Wanderers	Hamilton, Ontario
20:00	James (yellow card) 28'; Badibanga (yellow card) 65'; Badibanga 79'	Report	Nimick 29' (pen.); Nimick (yellow card) 58'; Fillion (yellow card) 62'; Fernandez (yellow card) 73'; Coimbra (yellow card) 78'	Stadium: Tim Hortons Field; Attendance: 4,824; Referee: Carly Shaw-MacLaren

26 August 2023 21	Halifax Wanderers	3–0	Valour FC	Halifax, Nova Scotia
16:00	Loughrey (yellow card) 10'; Nimick 49'; Timoteo (yellow card) 54'; Morelli 75'; Rampersad (yellow card) 76'; Giraldo 87'; Giraldo (yellow card) 88'	Report	Samaké (yellow card) 5'; Cela (yellow card) 31'; de Brienne (yellow card) 39'; Gutiérrez (yellow card) 78'	Stadium: Wanderers Grounds; Attendance: 4,907; Referee: Michael Venne

4 September 2023 22	Halifax Wanderers	1–2	York United	Halifax, Nova Scotia
15:00	Perruzza 31'; Henry (yellow card) 62'; Nimick (yellow card) 90+7'	Report	Ricci 45+2'; Abatneh (yellow card) 55'; Thompson 63'; Soumaoro (yellow card) 75'; De Rosario (yellow card) 90+4'	Stadium: Wanderers Grounds; Attendance: 6,254; Referee: Marie-Soleil Beaudoin

8 September 2023 23	Pacific FC	1–1	Halifax Wanderers	Langford, British Columbia
23:00	Toussaint (yellow card) 45+1'; Didic (yellow card) 50'; Sellouf 57' (pen.); Amedume (yellow card) 85'	Report	Wilson 45+1'; Armaan Wilson (yellow card) 58'; Mwandwe (yellow card) 69'	Stadium: Starlight Stadium; Attendance: 3,153; Referee: Alain Ruch

12 September 2023 24	Halifax Wanderers	1–2	Cavalry FC	Halifax, Nova Scotia
19:00	Ferrazzo (yellow card) 43'; Loughrey (yellow card) 52'; Coimbra (yellow card) 70'; Nimick 79' (pen.); Watson (yellow card) 90+6'	Report	Trafford (yellow card) 3'; Henry 27'; Kobza (yellow card) 47'; Camargo (yellow card) 47'; Klomp 54'; Kamdem (yellow card) 88'; Carducci (yellow card) 90+2'	Stadium: Wanderers Grounds; Attendance: 5,422; Referee: Yusri Rudolf

18 September 2023 25	Halifax Wanderers	3–2	Atlético Ottawa	Halifax, Nova Scotia
19:00	Ferrin 49'; Omar (yellow card) 50'; Perruzza 56'; Rampersad (yellow card) 74'; Fernandez (yellow card) 90+1'; Giraldo 90+2'; Watson (red card) 90+4'; Fillion (yellow card) 90+6'	Report	Salter 13', 90+1'; Antinoro (yellow card) 53'; Roy (yellow card) 90+1'	Stadium: Wanderers Grounds; Attendance: 5,132; Referee: Renzo Villanueva
Note: Game originally scheduled for 16 September, postponed two days due to impact of Hurricane Lee.

23 September 2023 26	Vancouver FC	2–1	Halifax Wanderers	Langley, British Columbia
17:00	Romeo (yellow card) 37'; Fry (yellow card) 50'; Bitar 69'; Nimick 90+5' (o.g.)	Report	Ferrin 42'; Fernandez (yellow card) 47'; Loughrey (yellow card) 61'; Wilson (yellow card) 90'	Stadium: Langley Events Centre; Attendance: 2,099; Referee: Mathieu Souaré

30 September 2023 27	Halifax Wanderers	2–1	Forge FC	Halifax, Nova Scotia
15:00	Ferrin 12'; Nimick 45+2'; Coimbra (yellow card) 58'; Timoteo (yellow card) 68'; Loughrey (yellow card) 90+3'	Report	Pacius 34'; Sissoko (yellow card) 37'; Hojabrpour (yellow card) 41'; Bekker (yellow card) 85'; Rama (yellow card) 87'	Stadium: Wanderers Grounds; Attendance: 6,254; Referee: Michael Venne

6 October 2023 28	Valour FC	0–1	Halifax Wanderers	Winnipeg, Manitoba
20:30		Report		Stadium: IG Field

==== Playoff matches ====
14 October 2023 Quarter-Final	Halifax Wanderers	0–1	Pacific FC	Halifax, Nova Scotia
15:00		Report		Stadium: Wanderers Grounds; Attendance: 6,254; Referee: Yusri Rudolf

=== Canadian Championship ===
==== Preliminary round ====
19 April 2023	Halifax Wanderers	1–3	Atlético Ottawa	Toronto, Ontario (Note: York Lions Stadium was selected as a neutral venue due to both clubs being unable to host the match.)
18:00	Ferrin 19'	Report	Shaw 40'; Espejo 44'; Tissot 85'	Stadium: York Lions Stadium; Referee: Myriam Marcotte
