= 2022 HFX Wanderers FC season =

HFX Wanderers
2022 season
- President: Derek Martin
- Head coach: Stephen Hart
- Stadium: Wanderers Grounds
- Canadian Premier League: 7th
- Canadian Championship: Quarter-finals
- Top goalscorer: League: Samuel Salter (11); All: Samuel Salter (12)
Home colours	Away colours

The 2022 HFX Wanderers FC season was the fourth season in the history of HFX Wanderers FC. In addition to the Canadian Premier League, the club competed in the Canadian Championship.

== Squad ==
As of August 19, 2022

No.	Player	Nationality	Position(s)	Date of birth (age)	Previous club
Goalkeepers
1	Kieran Baskett	(Canada)	GK	September 27, 2001 (aged 21)	(United States) William & Mary Tribe
40	Adisa De Rosario	(United States)	GK	October 27, 2004 (aged 18)	(Canada) Toronto FC Academy
50	Christian Oxner	(Canada)	GK	July 29, 1996 (aged 26)	(Canada) Saint Mary's Huskies
Defenders
2	Peter Schaale	(Germany)	CB	June 14, 1996 (aged 26)	(Canada) CBU Capers
3	Zachary Fernandez	(Canada)	RB	September 24, 2001 (aged 21)	(Canada) A.S. Blainville
4	Cristian Campagna	(Canada)	CB	November 29, 2001 (aged 21)	(Canada) Whitecaps FC 2
19	Obeng Tabi	(Canada)	LB	October 28, 2000 (aged 22)	(United States) LSUE Bengals
20	Jake Ruby	(Canada)	RB	June 4, 2000 (aged 22)	(Canada) Trinity Western Spartans
31	Eriks Santos	(Brazil)	CB	February 23, 1996 (aged 26)	(Georgia (country)) Dila Gori
52	Gabriel Escobar	(El Salvador)	LB	April 4, 2000 (aged 22)	(Canada) TSS FC Rovers
77	Nicholas Gagan	(Canada)	CB / DM	April 14, 2004 (aged 18)	(Canada) Ottawa South United
	Nassim Nouajaa	(El Salvador)	CB / DM	May 7, 2004 (aged 18)	(Canada) CF Montréal U23
Midfielders
5	Pierre Lamothe	(Canada)	AM	September 18, 1997 (aged 25)	(Canada) A.S. Blainville
13	Aidan Daniels	(Canada)	AM	September 6, 1998 (aged 24)	(United States) OKC Energy
18	Andre Rampersad	(Trinidad and Tobago)	CM	February 2, 1995 (aged 27)	(Trinidad and Tobago) Santa Rosa
21	Marcello Polisi	(Canada)	CM / DM	January 24, 1997 (aged 25)	(Canada) SFU Athletics
22	Mohamed Omar	(Canada)	CM / DM / CB	January 22, 1999 (aged 23)	(United States) Notre Dame Fighting Irish
28	Jérémy Gagnon-Laparé	(Canada)	CM	March 9, 1995 (aged 27)	(United States) Saint Louis FC
37	Lifumpa Mwandwe	(England)	RW / LW / CF	December 29, 2000 (aged 22)	(Wales) Newtown
Forwards
7	Alex Marshall	(Jamaica)	LW / CF	February 24, 1998 (aged 24)	(Jamaica) Cavalier
8	Elhadji Mour Samb	(Senegal)	ST / RW / LW	January 8, 1994 (aged 28)	(Senegal) Diambars FC
9	Samuel Salter	(Canada)	CF	August 9, 2000 (aged 22)	(Canada) AS Blainville
10	João Morelli	(Brazil)	CF / AM	March 11, 1996 (aged 26)	(Estonia) FCI Levadia
11	Akeem Garcia	(Trinidad and Tobago)	CF / RW	September 11, 1996 (aged 26)	(Trinidad and Tobago) Santa Rosa
23	Cory Bent	(England)	LW / ST	May 14, 1997 (aged 25)	(Canada) CBU Capers
25	Ludwig Kodjo Amla	(Denmark)	ST	November 13, 2000 (aged 22)	(Canada) CS St-Hubert
27	Ryan Robinson	(Canada)	CF / ST	June 30, 2001 (aged 21)	(Canada) Vaughan Azzurri
	Owen Degelman	(Canada)	CF	May 30, 2005 (aged 17)	(Germany) Chemnitzer FC

== Transfers ==
=== In ===
No.	Pos.	Player	From club	Fee/notes	Date	Source
13	MF	(Canada) Aidan Daniels	(United States) OKC Energy	Free	January 19, 2022	
3	DF	(Canada) Zachary Fernandez	(Canada) A.S. Blainville	Free	January 26, 2022	
19	DF	(Canada) Obeng Tabi	(United States) LSUE Bengals	Free	January 26, 2022	
22	MF	(Canada) Mohamed Omar	(United States) Notre Dame Fighting Irish	Free	February 16, 2022	
	DF	(Democratic Republic of the Congo) Ousman Maheshe	(Canada) NAIT Ooks	Free, signed and loaned to FC Edmonton	March 29, 2022	
	DF	(Canada) Wesley Timoteo	(Cyprus) PO Xylotymbou	Free, signed and loaned to FC Edmonton	March 29, 2022	
	MF	(Canada) C.J. Smith	(United States) Houston Baptist Huskies	Free, signed and loaned to FC Edmonton	March 29, 2022	
30	DF	(Canada) Colin Gander	(Canada) Guelph Gryphons	Selected 11th overall in the 2022 CPL–U Sports Draft	April 6, 2022	
77	DF	(Canada) Nicholas Gagan	(Canada) Ottawa South United	Signed to a development contract	April 6, 2022	
27	FW	(Canada) Ryan Robinson	(Canada) Vaughan Azzurri	Free	April 6, 2022	
16	DF	(Canada) Kareem Sow	(Canada) Montreal Carabins	Signed to a development contract	May 9, 2022	
8	FW	(Senegal) Elhadji Mour Samb	(Senegal) Diambars FC	Free	May 9, 2022	
37	MF	(England) Lifumpa Mwandwe	(Wales) Newtown	Undisclosed	July 13, 2022	
25	FW	(Denmark) Ludwig Kodjo Amla	(Canada) CS St-Hubert	Free	July 30, 2022	
52	DF	(El Salvador) Gabriel Escobar	(Canada) TSS FC Rovers	Free	August 15, 2022	
	DF	(Canada) Nassim Nouajaa	(Canada) CF Montréal U23	Signed to a development contract	August 15, 2022	
40	GK	(United States) Adisa De Rosario	(Canada) Toronto FC Academy	Signed to a development contract	August 18, 2022	
	FW	(Canada) Owen Degelman	(Germany) Chemnitzer FC	Signed to a development contract	August 18, 2022	
4	DF	(Canada) Cristian Campagna	(Canada) Whitecaps FC 2	Free	August 19, 2022	

==== Draft picks ====
HFX Wanderers will make the following selections in the 2022 CPL–U Sports Draft. Draft picks are not automatically signed to the team roster. Only those who are signed to a contract will be listed as transfers in.

Round	Selection	Pos.	Player	Nationality	University
1	3	MF	Christopher Campoli	Canada	Ontario Tech
2	11	DF	Colin Gander	Canada	Guelph

=== Out ===
No.	Pos.	Player	To club	Fee/notes	Date	Source
8	MF	(Morocco) Omar Kreim	Retired		December 22, 2021	
3	DF	(Canada) Morey Doner	(United States) Monterey Bay FC	Option declined	January 5, 2022	
6	DF	(Haiti) Jems Geffrard	(Canada) CS Mont-Royal Outremont	Contract expired	January 5, 2022	
10	MF	(Canada) Alessandro Riggi	(Canada) Valour FC	Option declined	January 5, 2022	
15	MF	(Canada) Scott Firth		Option declined	January 5, 2022	
19	MF	(Cuba) Alejandro Portal	(Canada) Vaughan Azzurri	Option declined	January 5, 2022	
25	FW	(Guinea) Mamadi Camara	(Canada) FC Edmonton	Option declined	January 5, 2022	
39	FW	(Canada) Stefan Karajovanovic	(Canada) Toronto FC II	Option declined	January 5, 2022	
14	DF	(Canada) Mateo Restrepo	Retired		July 23, 2022	

==== Loans out ====
No.	Pos.	Player	Loaned to	Fee/notes	Date	Source
	DF	(Democratic Republic of the Congo) Ousman Maheshe	(Canada) FC Edmonton	Season-long loan	March 29, 2022	
	DF	(Canada) Wesley Timoteo	(Canada) FC Edmonton	Season-long loan	March 29, 2022	
	MF	(Canada) C.J. Smith	(Canada) FC Edmonton	Season-long loan	March 29, 2022	

== Pre-season and friendlies ==
On March 11, HFX Wanderers FC announced that the club had played New Brunswick club CS Dieppe in a friendly earlier that day. On March 16, the club announced that it would hold a pre-season camp in Mississauga, Ontario with friendlies against Forge FC and clubs in League1 Ontario.

March 11 Friendly	HFX Wanderers FC	7–0	CS Dieppe

March 18 Friendly	Vaughan Azzurri	0–1	HFX Wanderers FC
5:00pm ADT		Report	Morelli 42'

March 23 Friendly	Woodbridge Strikers	0–5	HFX Wanderers FC	Vaughan, Ontario
8:05pm ADT		Report	Daniels 36'; Robinson 60'; Munoko 65'; Martins 77', 80'	Stadium: Ontario Soccer Centre

March 26 Friendly	Forge FC	2–1	HFX Wanderers FC	Hamilton, Ontario
3:00pm ADT	Goal	Report	Santos 75'

March 31 Friendly	Simcoe County Rovers FC	0–1	HFX Wanderers FC
8:00pm ADT		Report	Morelli

== Competitions ==
Matches are listed in Halifax local time: Atlantic Daylight Time (UTC−3) until November 5, and Atlantic Standard Time (UTC−4) otherwise.

=== Overview ===
Competition	First match	Last match	Starting round	Final position	Record							
Competition	First match	Last match	Starting round	Final position	Pld	W	D	L	GF	GA	GD	Win %
Canadian Premier League	April 7	October 9	Matchday 1		18	5	3	10	16	27	−11	27.78
Canadian Championship	May 10	May 24	Preliminary Round	Quarter-finals	2	1	0	1	3	2	+1	50.00
Total					20	6	3	11	19	29	−10	30.00

Last updated: August 6, 2022
Source: Competitions

=== Canadian Premier League ===
==== Table ====
Pos	Team	Pld	W	D	L	GF	GA	GD	Pts	Qualification
1	Atlético Ottawa (S)	28	13	10	5	36	29	+7	49	Advance to playoffs
2	Forge (C)	28	14	5	9	47	25	+22	47	Advance to playoffs
3	Cavalry	28	14	5	9	39	33	+6	47	Advance to playoffs
4	Pacific	28	13	7	8	36	33	+3	46	Advance to playoffs
5	Valour	28	10	7	11	36	34	+2	37	
6	York United	28	9	7	12	31	37	−6	34	
7	HFX Wanderers	28	8	5	15	24	38	−14	29	
8	FC Edmonton	28	4	8	16	31	51	−20	20	

Source: CanPL.ca
Rules for classification: 1) points; 2) total wins; 3) goal differential; 4) goals for; 5) away goals differential; 6) away goals for; 7) home goals differential; 8) home goals for; 9) U-21 minutes; 10) coin toss or drawing of lots.
(C) Champion; (S) Regular season winner

==== Results by match ====
Match	1	2	3	4	5	6	7	8	9	10	11	12	13	14	15	16	17	18	19	20	21	22	23	24	25	26	27	28
Result	W	L	L	W	D	D	L	W	L	W	L	W	L	L	L	D	L	L	W	L	W	L	D	W	D	L	L	L
Position	2	3	6	3	4	4	7	5	5	4	5	5	5	6	6	6	6	6	6	6	6	6	7	7	7	7	7	7

Updated to match(es) played on October 30, 2022. Source: #Matches
W = Win; D = Draw; L = Loss

==== Matches ====
April 7 1	York United FC	0–1	HFX Wanderers FC	Toronto, Ontario
8:30pm	Johnston (yellow card) 65'; Hernández (red card) 90+5'	Report	Morelli 53' (pen.); Tabi (yellow card) 71'; Restrepo (yellow card) 87'	Stadium: York Lions Stadium; Attendance: 1,802; Referee: Yusri Rudolf

April 16 2	Atlético Ottawa	1–0	HFX Wanderers FC	Ottawa, Ontario
2:00pm	McKendry (yellow card) 45'; Bassett (yellow card) 56'; Shaw 81'	Report	Bent (yellow card) 31'; Lamothe (yellow card) 56'; Santos (yellow card) 87'	Stadium: TD Place Stadium; Attendance: 3,122; Referee: Mathieu Souaré

April 23 3	Pacific FC	2–1	HFX Wanderers FC	Langford, British Columbia
8:00pm	Aparicio 25', (yellow card) 56'; Samake (yellow card) 71'; Díaz 85' (pen.); Daniels (yellow card) 90+1'	Report	Bent 45+1'; Tabi (yellow card) 58'	Stadium: Starlight Stadium; Attendance: 3,042; Referee: Juan Marquez

April 30 4	HFX Wanderers FC	3–1	FC Edmonton	Halifax, Nova Scotia
3:00pm	Tabi (yellow card) 8'; Bent 17'; Rampersad (yellow card) 28'; Salter 61'; Garcia 71' (pen.)	Report	Ulbricht 9' (pen.); Mohammed (yellow card) 14'; Triantafillou (yellow card) 65'; Vaikla (yellow card) 70'	Stadium: Wanderers Grounds; Attendance: 6,213; Referee: Ben Hoskins

May 7 5	Valour FC	0–0	HFX Wanderers FC	Winnipeg, Manitoba
4:00pm	Baquero (yellow card) 58'; Cebara (yellow card) 79'; Levis (yellow card) 89'	Report	Gagnon-Laparé (yellow card) 32'; Schaale (yellow card) 52'; Rampersad (yellow card) 76'	Stadium: IG Field; Attendance: 3,277; Referee: Marie-Soleil Beaudoin

May 15 6	HFX Wanderers FC	2–2	Cavalry FC	Halifax, Nova Scotia
3:00pm	Garcia 37'; Santos (yellow card) 49'; Salter 61'; Fernandez (yellow card) 76'; Oxner (yellow card) 90+2'; Gander (yellow card) 90+4'	Report	Loturi (yellow card) 2'; Bevan 20'; Simmons (yellow card) 80'; Trafford (yellow card) 87'; Klomp 90+4'	Stadium: Wanderers Grounds; Attendance: 5,244; Referee: Marie-Soleil Beaudoin

May 20 7	HFX Wanderers FC	0–4	Forge FC	Halifax, Nova Scotia
7:00pm	Rampersad (yellow card) 77'; Samb (yellow card) 83'	Report	Choinière 22', 60'; Bekker (yellow card) 42'; Welshman 52'; Rama (yellow card) 55'; Hojabrpour (yellow card) 60'; Pacius 79'	Stadium: Wanderers Grounds; Attendance: 5,877; Referee: Myriam Marcotte

June 4 8	HFX Wanderers FC	1–0	York United FC	Halifax, Nova Scotia
3:00pm	Gander (yellow card) 32'; Garcia (yellow card) 45+1' (goal) 72' (pen.); Daniels (yellow card) 85'	Report		Stadium: Wanderers Grounds; Attendance: 6,224; Referee: Yusri Rudolf

June 11 9	Cavalry FC	1–0	HFX Wanderers FC	Foothills County, Alberta
4:30pm	Pepple 47'; C. Trafford (yellow card) 54'; Yao (yellow card) 69'; M. Trafford (yellow card) 70'; Camargo (yellow card) 90+2'	Report	Rampersad (yellow card) 65'; Restrepo (yellow card) 85'	Stadium: ATCO Field; Attendance: 3,045; Referee: Juan Marquez

June 14 10	FC Edmonton	1–2	HFX Wanderers FC	Edmonton, Alberta
11:00pm	Timoteo 10', (yellow card) 51'; Loughrey (yellow card) 85'; Smith (yellow card) 90'	Report	Polisi (yellow card) 24'; Salter 53', 59'; Gagnon-Laparé (yellow card) 88'; Fernandez (yellow card) 90'	Stadium: Clarke Stadium; Attendance: 784; Referee: Fabrizio Stasolla

June 19 11	HFX Wanderers FC	0–3	Forge FC	Halifax, Nova Scotia
3:00pm	Polisi (yellow card) 63'; Restrepo (red card) 80'	Report	Pacius 15'; Jensen 25'; Choinière (yellow card) 30'; Sissoko (yellow card) 45+1'; Bekker (yellow card) 56'; Morgan (yellow card) 61'; Welshman 84'	Stadium: Wanderers Grounds; Attendance: 6,214; Referee: Scott Bowman

June 25 12	Pacific FC	0–3	HFX Wanderers FC	Langford, British Columbia
6:00pm	Dixon (yellow card) 57'	Report	Samb 24'; Daniels 36'; Salter 71' (pen.); Fernandez (yellow card) 72'; Schaale (yellow card) 79'; Oxner (yellow card) 87'	Stadium: Starlight Stadium; Attendance: 3,290; Referee: Alain Ruch

June 30 13	HFX Wanderers FC	0–2	Atlético Ottawa	Halifax, Nova Scotia
7:30pm	Salter (yellow card) 56' (yellow-red card) 69'; Schaale (yellow card) 83'	Report	Tabla (yellow card) 17'; McKendry (yellow card) 24'; Espejo (yellow card) 50'; Bassett 70', (yellow card) 90'; Acosta 87'	Stadium: Wanderers Grounds; Attendance: 6,500; Referee: Ben Hoskins

July 10 14	Valour FC	1–0	HFX Wanderers FC	Winnipeg, Manitoba
4:00pm	Riggi (yellow card) 52'; Dyer 84'; Ascanio (yellow card) 89'	Report	Gagnon-Laparé (yellow card) 78'; Polisi (yellow card) 87'	Stadium: IG Field; Attendance: 3,607; Referee: Michael Venne

July 14 15	Cavalry FC	3–0	HFX Wanderers FC	Foothills County, Alberta
9:30pm	Alarcón (yellow card) 25'; Di Chiara (yellow card) 27'; Musse 52', 56'; Camargo 60'	Report	Gagnon-Laparé (red card) 27'	Stadium: ATCO Field; Attendance: 3,006; Referee: Carly Shaw-MacLaren

July 23 16	HFX Wanderers FC	1–1	FC Edmonton	Halifax, Nova Scotia
2:30pm	Rampersad (yellow card) 16'; Salter 77' (pen.); Lamothe (yellow card) 83'	Report	Higgins (yellow card) 3'; Warschewski 19' (pen.); Simmons (yellow card) 27'; Singh (yellow card) 43'; Bissainthe (yellow card) 90+5'	Stadium: Wanderers Grounds; Attendance: 5,724; Referee: Juan Marquez

August 1 17	HFX Wanderers FC	2–4	York United FC	Halifax, Nova Scotia
3:00pm	Santos 66'; Garcia 86' (pen.)	Report	Wilson 15'; De Rosario 34', 69'; Hernández (yellow card) 36'; Zator (yellow card) 45+2'; Lawrie-Lattanzio 50', (yellow card) 60'; N'sa (yellow card) 86'	Stadium: Wanderers Grounds; Referee: Fabrizio Stasolla

August 6 18	Forge FC	1–0	HFX Wanderers FC	Hamilton, Ontario
5:00pm	Pacius 2'; Metusala (yellow card) 42'; Rama (yellow card) 85'; Poku (yellow card) 89'	Report	Schaale (yellow card) 90+2'	Stadium: Tim Hortons Field; Referee: Michael Venne

August 13 19	HFX Wanderers FC	1-0	Valour FC	Halifax, Nova Scotia
3:00pm	Salter 44'; Fernandez (yellow card) 57'; Omar (yellow card) 57'; Rampersad (yellow card) 59'	Report	Gutierrez (yellow card) 56'; Mekidèche (yellow card) 57' (yellow-red card) 67'; Dyer (yellow card) 73'	Stadium: Wanderers Grounds; Attendance: 5,652

August 17 20	Atlético Ottawa	3-2	HFX Wanderers FC	Ottawa, Ontario
8:00pm	Aleman 21'; Espejo (yellow card) 25'; Tissot 51'; Moragrega (yellow card) 82'; Perez 90+1'; Sissoko (yellow card) 90+2'	Report	Tabi (yellow card) 47'; Lamothe 58'; Gagnon-Laparé (yellow card) 62'; Salter 90+1' (pen.)	Stadium: TD Place Stadium; Attendance: 4,281

August 20 21	HFX Wanderers FC	1-0	Pacific FC	Halifax, Nova Scotia
2:30pm	Schaale (yellow card) 68' Omar (yellow card) 71' Lamothe 82'	Report	Didic (yellow card) 19'; Aparicio (red card) 29'; Young (yellow card) 30'; Bustos (yellow card) 31'; Samake{yel|40}}	Stadium: Wanderers Grounds; Attendance: 5,729

August 28 22	FC Edmonton	3-2	HFX Wanderers FC	Edmonton, Alberta
7:00pm	Gonzalez 21'; Warschewski (yellow card) 39'; Warschewski; Warschewski; Simmons (yellow card) 63'; Shome (yellow card) 86'	Report	Salter 38' (pen.); Murasiranwa 84' (o.g.)	Stadium: Clarke Stadium; Attendance: 1,613

September 5 23	HFX Wanderers FC	0-0	Cavalry FC	Halifax, Nova Scotia
3:00pm	Escobar (yellow card) 51'; Lamothe (yellow card) 74'	Report	Cantave (yellow card) 33'; C. Trafford (yellow card) 76'; Di Chiara (yellow card) 83'	Stadium: Wanderers Grounds; Attendance: 6,088

September 10 24	HFX Wanderers FC	1-0	Valour FC	Halifax, Nova Scotia
3:00pm	Salter 33' (pen.); Fernandez (yellow card) 65'; Polisi (yellow card) 66'; Baskett {yel|80}	Report		Stadium: Wanderers Grounds; Attendance: 6,058

September 16 25	York United FC	0-0	HFX Wanderers FC	Toronto, Ontario
8:30pm	Thompson (yellow card) 8'; Verhoeven (yellow card) 11'	Report	Lamothe (yellow card) 50'; Gagnon-Laparé (yellow card) 85'; Baskett (yellow card) 88'; Tabi (yellow card) 89'	Stadium: York Lions Stadium; Attendance: 1,525

September 27 26	HFX Wanderers FC	0-2	Pacific FC	Halifax, Nova Scotia
7:00pm	Fernandez (yellow card) 18'	Report	dos Santos (yellow card) 32'; Didic (yellow card) 37'; Daniels {goal|45}}; Heard 69'; Mavila (yellow card) 90+3'	Stadium: Wanderers Grounds; Attendance: 4,332

October 1 27	HFX Wanderers FC	1-2	Atlético Ottawa	Halifax, Nova Scotia
3:00pm	Omar (yellow card) 25'; Gagnon-Laparé (yellow card) 61'; Salter 79'	Report	Tissot (yellow card) 30'; Tissot 40'; Bahous 57'; Acosta (yellow card) 71'; Wright (yellow card) 76'; Bassett (yellow card) 78'; McKendry (yellow card) 88'	Stadium: Wanderers Grounds; Attendance: 5,944

October 9 28	Forge FC	1-0	HFX Wanderers FC	Hamilton, Ontario
2:00pm	Poku 8' Welshman (yellow card) 68' Metusala (yellow card) 90+2'	Report	Lamothe (yellow card) 19'; Campagna (yellow card) 88'	Stadium: Tim Hortons Field; Attendance: 3,016

=== Canadian Championship ===
May 10 PR	Guelph United FC	0–2	HFX Wanderers FC	Guelph, Ontario
8:30pm	Laryea (yellow card) 56'; Skublak (yellow card) 78'; Zajac (yellow card) 78'; Dick (yellow card) 82'; Doros (yellow card) 90'	Report	Daniels (yellow card) 7', (goal) 60'; Garcia 22' (pen.)	Stadium: Alumni Stadium; Referee: Filip Dujic

May 24 QF	HFX Wanderers FC	1–2	Toronto FC	Halifax, Nova Scotia
7:00pm	Rampersad (yellow card) 53'; Salter 69'	Report	Priso (yellow card) 23'; O'Neill (yellow card) 53'; Bradley 55'; Schaale 87' (o.g.); Akinola (yellow card) 90+1'	Stadium: Wanderers Grounds; Referee: Juan Marquez

== Statistics ==
=== Squad and statistics ===
No.	Pos	Nat	Player	Total		Canadian Premier League		Canadian Championship	
No.	Pos	Nat	Player	Apps	Goals	Apps	Goals	Apps	Goals
1	GK	(Canada) CAN	Kieran Baskett	9	0	9+0	0	0+0	0
2	DF	(Germany) GER	Peter Schaale	22	0	14+6	0	1+1	0
3	DF	(Canada) CAN	Zachary Fernandez	26	0	24+0	0	2+0	0
4	DF	(Canada) CAN	Cristian Campagna	7	0	6+1	0	0+0	0
5	MF	(Canada) CAN	Pierre Lamothe	22	2	17+4	2	1+0	0
7	MF	(Jamaica) JAM	Alex Marshall	19	0	8+10	0	0+1	0
8	FW	(Canada) CAN	Mour Samb	10	1	5+4	1	1+0	0
9	FW	(Canada) CAN	Samuel Salter	29	12	20+7	11	2+0	1
10	FW	(Brazil) BRA	João Morelli	2	1	2+0	1	0+0	0
11	FW	(Trinidad and Tobago) TTO	Akeem Garcia	15	5	8+5	4	1+1	1
13	MF	(Canada) CAN	Aidan Daniels	23	2	16+5	1	2+0	1
14	DF	(Canada) CAN	Mateo Restrepo	14	0	9+4	0	1+0	0
16	DF	(Canada) CAN	Kareem Sow	5	0	5+0	0	0+0	0
18	MF	(Trinidad and Tobago) TTO	Andre Rampersad	27	0	25+0	0	2+0	0
19	DF	(Canada) CAN	Obeng Tabi	19	0	11+8	0	0+0	0
20	DF	(Canada) CAN	Jake Ruby	10	0	9+1	0	0+0	0
21	MF	(Canada) CAN	Marcello Polisi	19	0	11+6	0	1+1	0
22	MF	(Canada) CAN	Mohamed Omar	17	0	12+3	0	1+1	0
23	FW	(England) ENG	Cory Bent	20	2	11+8	2	1+0	0
25	FW	(Canada) CAN	Ludwig Kodjo Amla	9	0	2+7	0	0+0	0
27	FW	(Canada) CAN	Ryan Robinson	19	0	2+16	0	0+1	0
28	MF	(Canada) CAN	Jérémy Gagnon-Laparé	24	0	20+2	0	1+1	0
30	DF	(Canada) CAN	Colin Gander	17	0	10+5	0	2+0	0
31	DF	(Brazil) BRA	Eriks Santos	25	1	22+2	1	1+0	0
37	FW	(England) ENG	Lifumpa Mwandwe	12	0	8+4	0	0+0	0
40	GK	(Canada) CAN	Adisa De Rosario	1	0	1+0	0	0+0	0
50	GK	(Canada) CAN	Christian Oxner	20	0	18+0	0	2+0	0

=== Top scorers ===
Rank	Nat.	Player	Pos.	Canadian Premier League	Canadian Championship	TOTAL
1	(Canada)	Samuel Salter	FW	11	1	12
2	(Trinidad and Tobago)	Akeem Garcia	FW	4	1	5
3	(England)	Cory Bent	FW	2	0	2
4	(Canada)	Pierre Lamothe	M	2	0	2
5	(Canada)	Aidan Daniels	M	1	1	2
6	(Brazil)	João Morelli	FW	1	0	1
7	(Canada)	Mour Samb	FW	1	0	1
8	(Brazil)	Eriks Santos	D	1	0	1
Totals				23	3	26

=== Clean sheets ===
Rank	Nat.	Player	Canadian Premier League	Canadian Championship	TOTAL
1	(Canada)	Kieran Baskett	5	0	5
2	(Canada)	Christian Oxner	4	1	5
Totals			9	1	10

=== Disciplinary record ===
No.	Pos.	Nat.	Player	Canadian Premier League		Canadian Championship		TOTAL	
No.	Pos.	Nat.	Player	Yellow card	Red card	Yellow card	Red card	Yellow card	Red card
18	MF	(Trinidad and Tobago)	Andre Rampersad	6	0	1	0	7	0
28	MF	(Canada)	Jérémy Gagnon-Laparé	6	1	0	0	6	1
3	MF	(Canada)	Zachary Fernandez	6	0	0	0	6	0
5	MF	(Canada)	Pierre Lamothe	5	0	0	0	5	0
2	DF	(Germany)	Peter Schaale	5	0	0	0	5	0
19	DF	(Canada)	Obeng Tabi	5	0	0	0	5	0
21	MF	(Canada)	Marcello Polisi	4	0	0	0	4	0
22	MF	(Canada)	Mohamed Omar	3	0	0	0	3	0
14	DF	(Canada)	Mateo Restrepo	2	1	0	0	2	1
30	DF	(Canada)	Colin Gander	2	0	0	0	2	0
31	DF	(Brazil)	Eriks Santos	2	0	0	0	2	0
13	FW	(Canada)	Aidan Daniels	1	0	1	0	2	0
23	FW	(England)	Cory Bent	1	0	0	0	1	0
4	DF	(Canada)	Cristian Campagna	1	0	0	0	1	0
52	DF	(Canada)	Gabriel Escobar	1	0	0	0	1	0
11	FW	(Trinidad and Tobago)	Akeem Garcia	1	0	0	0	1	0
8	FW	(Canada)	Mour Samb	1	0	0	0	1	0
Totals				52	2	2	0	54	2
