= Riley Ferrazzo =

Canadian soccer player (born 1999)

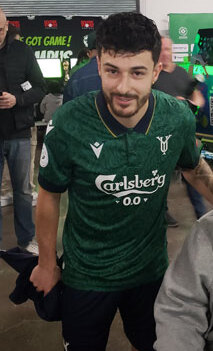
- Ferrazzo in 2025

Personal information
- Full name: Riley Alexander Ferrazzo
- Date of birth: August 4, 1999 (age 27)
- Place of birth: Toronto, Ontario, Canada
- Position: Defender

Team information
- Current team: Vaughan Azzurri

Youth career
- Vaughan Azzurri
- 2015–2017: Toronto FC

College career
Years	Team	Apps	(Gls)
2018	Humber Hawks	10	(3)
2021	Seneca Sting	4	(0)

Senior career*
Years	Team	Apps	(Gls)
2016–2017	Toronto FC III	37	(2)
2018	Vaughan Azzurri	3	(0)
2019	Aurora FC	15	(1)
2021–2022	Vaughan Azzurri	23	(3)
2023–2024	HFX Wanderers	42	(2)
2025	York United	21	(3)
2026–	Vaughan Azzurri	1	(0)
- * Club domestic league appearances and goals as of April 19, 2026

Riley Alexander Ferrazzo (born August 4, 1999) is a Canadian soccer player who plays for Vaughan Azzurri in the Ontario Premier League. Primarily a right-back, he has also played as a left-back, attacking midfielder and winger.

== Early life ==
Ferrazzo was born in Toronto, Ontario to parents of Italian heritage. His father was born in Bojano, Molise and emigrated to Toronto as a child, while his mother has origins in Ascoli Piceno, Marche. He began playing youth soccer with Vaughan Azzurri. Afterwards, he joined the Toronto FC Academy, where he was coached by Danny Dichio and played with the likes of Shaan Hundal, Julian Dunn, Jacob Shaffelburg, Rocco Romeo, and Ethan Beckford, among others.

== College career ==
In 2018, he attended Humber College and played for the men's soccer team. He scored his first goal on September 22, 2018 against the Cambrian Golden Shield. On October 10, he scored two goals in a 3-0 victory over the Conestoga Condors.

He scored the winning goal in the championship final as Humber defeated Collège Ahuntsic 1-0 to claim the Canadian Collegiate Athletic Association title. He was also named the OCAA Central Division Defensive Player of the Year. In 2021, he attended Seneca College and played for the men's soccer team.

== Club career ==
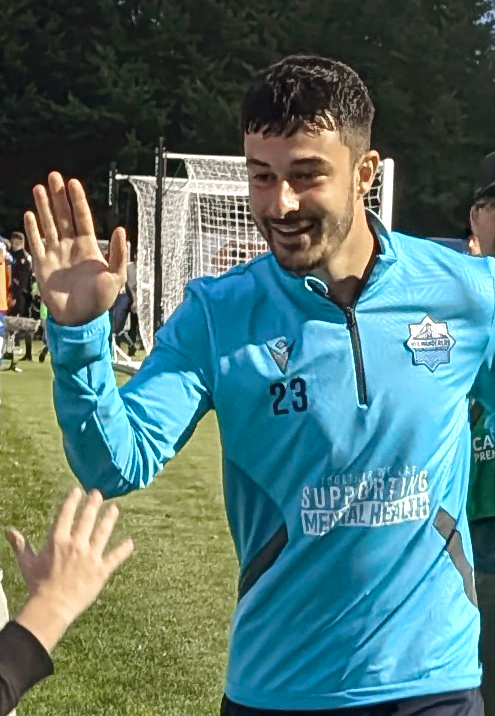
Ferrazzo with HFX Wanderers FC in 2024

In 2016 and 2017, Ferrazzo played with Toronto FC III in League1 Ontario. In 2018, he joined Vaughan Azzurri. In 2019, he played for Aurora FC. He was named a League1 Ontario Second Team All-Star.| In 2021 and 2022, he played for Vaughan Azzurri. In 2022, he was named a League1 Ontario Second Team All-Star for the second time.

In January 2023, he signed a professional contract with HFX Wanderers FC in the Canadian Premier League, joining Patrice Gheisar, who was his coach with Vaughan and had been named the Wanderers head coach a couple of months earlier.

He made his professional debut on April 15, 2023 against Atlético Ottawa and was also named to the CPL Team of the Week following the match. After the season, the club picked up his option for the 2024 season.

On April 27, 2024, he scored his first professional goal in a match against Atlético Ottawa. After the 2024 season, the club declined his contract option for 2025. Over his two seasons with the club, he scored two goals and added three assists, in 45 appearances across all competitions. In January 2025, Ferrazzo signed a one-year contract, with an option for 2026 with York United FC.

== International career ==
In 2016, he made his debut in the Canadian national program, attending a camp with the Canada U18 team in El Salvador.

== Career statistics ==
As of match played October 27, 2025

Club	Season	League			Playoffs		Domestic Cup		Continental		Total	
Club	Season	Division	Apps	Goals	Apps	Goals	Apps	Goals	Apps	Goals	Apps	Goals
Toronto FC III	2016	League1 Ontario	20	2	–		–		–		20	2
Toronto FC III	2017	League1 Ontario	17	0	–		–		–		17	0
Toronto FC III	Total		37	2	0	0	0	0	0	0	37	2
Vaughan Azzurri	2018	League1 Ontario	3	0	0	0	–		–		3	0
Aurora FC	2019	League1 Ontario	15	1	–		–		–		15	1
Vaughan Azzurri	2021	League1 Ontario	7	1	0	0	–		–		7	1
Vaughan Azzurri	2022	League1 Ontario	16	2	2	0	–		–		18	2
Vaughan Azzurri	Total		23	3	2	0	0	0	0	0	25	3
HFX Wanderers	2023	Canadian Premier League	22	0	1	0	1	0	–		24	0
HFX Wanderers	2024	Canadian Premier League	20	2	—		1	0	–		21	2
HFX Wanderers	Total		42	2	1	0	2	0	0	0	45	2
York United FC	2025	Canadian Premier League	21	3	2	0	3	0	–		26	3
Career total			141	11	5	0	5	0	0	0	151	11
