= Armaan Wilson =

Canadian soccer player (born 2002)

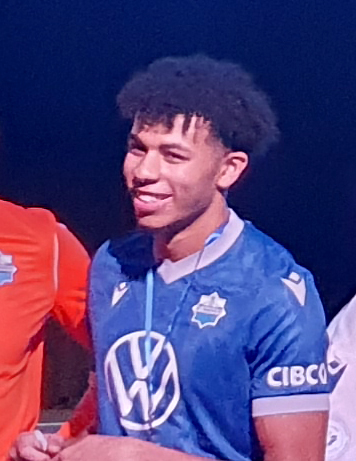
- Wilson in 2023

Personal information
- Full name: Armaan Mark Wilson
- Date of birth: May 29, 2002 (age 24)
- Place of birth: Kleinburg, Ontario, Canada
- Height: 6 ft 3 in (1.91 m)
- Position: Midfielder

Team information
- Current team: SJK Seinäjoki
- Number: 23

Youth career
- Vaughan Azzurri
- Woodbridge Strikers

College career
Years	Team	Apps	(Gls)
2020–2022	Providence Friars	44	(2)

Senior career*
Years	Team	Apps	(Gls)
2022	Woodbridge Strikers	7	(0)
2023	HFX Wanderers	11	(1)
2024–2025	KTP	29	(4)
2025–	SJK	34	(4)
- * Club domestic league appearances and goals as of 13 November 2026

Armaan Mark Wilson (born May 29, 2002) is a Canadian professional soccer player who plays for Finnish Veikkausliiga club SJK.

== Early life ==
Wilson played youth soccer with the Woodbridge Strikers, winning the Canadian National Championship in 2015 and the U17 Ontario Cup in 2019, where he was named MVP of the finals.

== College career ==
In 2020, he began attending Providence College, where he played for the men's soccer team. He made his collegiate debut on February 20, 2021 (as the fall 2020 season was postponed due to the COVID-19 pandemic against the Rhode Island Rams. He scored his first collegiate goal on November 18, 2021, against the Marist Red Foxes in the first round of the NCAA Tournament.

== Club career ==
In 2022, Wilson played with the Woodbridge Strikers in League1 Ontario.

In February 2023, he signed his first professional contract with HFX Wanderers FC of the Canadian Premier League. He made his professional debut on May 6, 2023, in a substitute appearance against Valour FC. On September 8, 2023, he made his first start and also scored his first professional goal in a 1-1 draw with Pacific FC, being named to the CPL Team of the Week afterwards.

In March 2024, he signed with KTP in the Finnish second tier Ykkösliiga. At the end of the season, they won the Ykkösliiga title and secured the promotion to top-tier Veikkausliiga.

In July 2025, Wilson signed with Finnish first tier Veikkausliiga side SJK Seinäjoki until 2027, for an undisclosed fee.

== Personal life ==
He is the younger brother of fellow professional soccer player Shafique Wilson.

== Career statistics ==
As of 1 July 2025

Club	Season	League			National cup (Note: Includes Suomen Cup)		Other		Total	
Club	Season	Division	Apps	Goals	Apps	Goals	Apps	Goals	Apps	Goals
Woodbridge Strikers	2022	League1 Ontario	7	0	—		—		7	0
HFX Wanderers FC	2023	Canadian Premier League	11	1	0	0	—		11	1
KTP	2024	Ykkösliiga	20	2	2	0	0	0	22	2
KTP	2025	Veikkausliiga	9	2	2	1	5 (Note: Includes Finnish League Cup)	0	16	3
KTP	Total		29	4	4	1	5	0	38	5
SJK Seinäjoki	2025	Veikkausliiga	0	0	–		0	0	0	0
Career total			47	5	4	1	5	0	56	6

== Honours ==
KTP

- Ykkösliiga: 2024
