= Lifumpa Mwandwe =

Zambian footballer (born 2000)

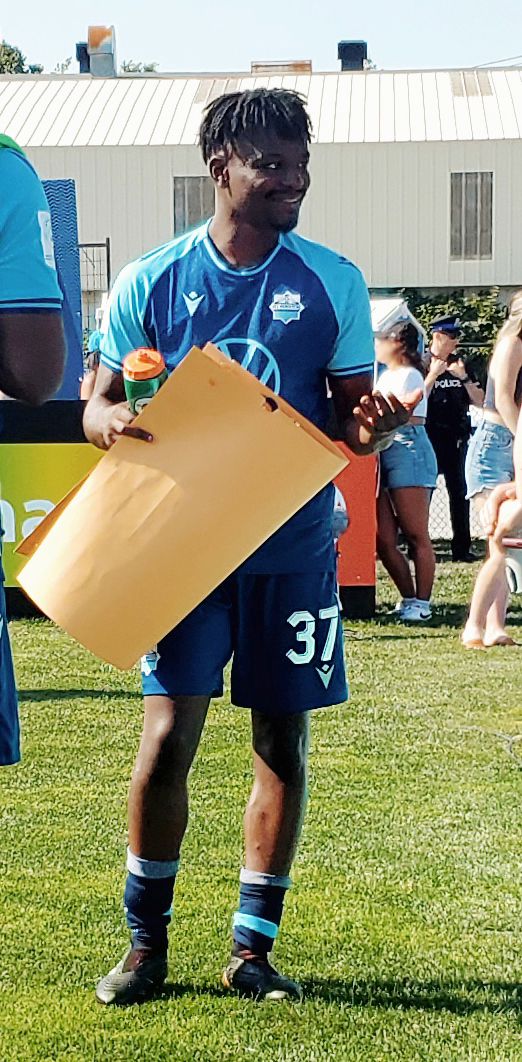
- Mwandwe with HFX Wanderers FC

Personal information
- Full name: Lifumpa Yande Mwandwe
- Date of birth: 29 December 2000 (age 25)
- Place of birth: Greenwich, England
- Height: 1.80 m (5 ft 11 in)
- Positions: Forward; winger

Team information
- Current team: Cardiff Met
- Number: 11

Youth career
- Wirral Schoolboys
- 2013–2019: Shrewsbury Town

Senior career*
Years	Team	Apps	(Gls)
2017–2020	Shrewsbury Town	0	(0)
2019–2020	→ Newtown (loan)	22	(3)
2021–2022	Newtown	47	(12)
2022–2023	HFX Wanderers	19	(0)
2023	→ Newtown (loan)	5	(0)
2024	Newtown	6	(1)
2024–2025	Connah's Quay Nomads	20	(3)
2025–	Cardiff Met	45	(10)
- * Club domestic league appearances and goals as of 07:50, 8 November 2026 (UTC)

Lifumpa Yande Mwandwe (born 29 December 2000) is an English professional footballer who plays as a forward or winger for Welsh club Cardiff Met in the Cymru Premier.

== Early life ==
Born in London, Mwandwe moved to Wirral as a youngster, and played for the Wirral Schoolboys. He joined the Shrewsbury Town youth system in 2013. During the 2017/18 season, he scored 20 goals for the Shrewsbury U18s.

== Club career ==
He made his senior debut for Shrewsbury Town, as a last-minute substitute, in a 3–0 victory against West Bromwich Albion U21s in an EFL Trophy group-stage match on 3 October 2017. In October 2018, he signed his first professional contract with Shrewsbury. In August 2019, he went on loan to Welsh club Newtown in the Cymru Premier. In June 2020, he was released by Shrewsbury.

In February 2021, he returned to Newtown on a permanent contract. On 17 April 2021, he scored a brace against Haverfordwest County. In January 2022, he extended his contract with the club for an additional 18 months. In the 2021–22 season, he was the most fouled player in the league and led the league in completed dribbled, helping the club earn a 2022–23 UEFA Europa Conference League qualification spot. He was named to the league Team of the Season, and was also nominated for the Young Player of the Year award, which was ultimately won by Mael Davies. In his final match for the club on 14 July 2022, ahead of his transfer to Canada, he scored a goal in the second leg of the UEFA Conference League 1st qualification round match against Havnar Bóltfelag of the Faroe Islands, to level the score on aggregate and converted the final kick in the penalty shootout to help Newtown advance to the next round.

In July 2022, he joined Canadian Premier League club HFX Wanderers FC through the 2023 season, with a club option for 2024. He made his debut for the club on 23 July against FC Edmonton as a substitute, in which he drew a penalty that was converted by Samuel Salter to tie the match. In January 2023, he returned to Newtown on a short-term two-month loan, until 28 February. He made his loan debut on 7 January against Connah's Quay Nomads. He then returned to the Wanderers for the 2023 CPL season, before departing the club after the conclusion of the season.

In January 2024, he once again returned to Newtown.

In August 2024, he signed with fellow Welsh first tier side Connah's Quay Nomads. He scored in his club debut on 3 August in a 2024–25 Welsh League Cup match against Buckley Town. He left the club at the end of the season.

In June 2025, he moved to Cardiff Met.

== International career ==
In 2018, he trained with the Zambia national under-20 team. He was then named to the roster for their 2019 Africa U-20 Cup of Nations qualification matches against Rwanda U20.

== Career statistics ==
As of matches played 19 April 2025

Appearances and goals by club, season and competition
Club	Season	League			National Cup		League Cup		Continental		Other		Total	
Club	Season	Division	Apps	Goals	Apps	Goals	Apps	Goals	Apps	Goals	Apps	Goals	Apps	Goals
Shrewsbury Town	2017–18	League One	0	0	0	0	0	0	—		1 (Note: Appearance in the EFL Trophy)	0	1	0
Shrewsbury Town	2018–19	League One	0	0	0	0	0	0	—		0	0	0	0
Shrewsbury Town	Total		0	0	0	0	0	0	0	0	1	0	1	0
Newtown (loan)	2019–20	Cymru Premier	22	3	3	0	2	2	—		—		27	5
Newtown	2020–21	Cymru Premier	17	5	0	0	0	0	—		—		17	5
Newtown	2021–22	Cymru Premier	30	7	1	0	2	1	1 (Note: Appearances in UEFA Europa Conference League)	0	—		34	8
Newtown	2022–23	Cymru Premier	0	0	0	0	0	0	2	1	—		2	1
Newtown	Total		69	15	4	0	4	3	3	1	0	0	81	19
HFX Wanderers	2022	Canadian Premier League	12	0	0	0	—		—		—		12	0
HFX Wanderers	2023	Canadian Premier League	7	0	0	0	—		—		0	0	7	0
HFX Wanderers	Total		19	0	0	0	0	0	0	0	0	0	19	0
Newtown (loan)	2022–23	Cymru Premier	5	0	1	0	0	0	0	0	—		6	0
Newtown	2023–24	Cymru Premier	6	1	0	0	0	0	—		—		6	1
Connah's Quay Nomads	2024–25	Cymru Premier	19	3	2	0	1	1	—		—		22	4
Career total			118	19	7	0	5	4	3	1	1	0	134	24
