= Kosi Nwafornso =

Nigerian footballer (born 1997)

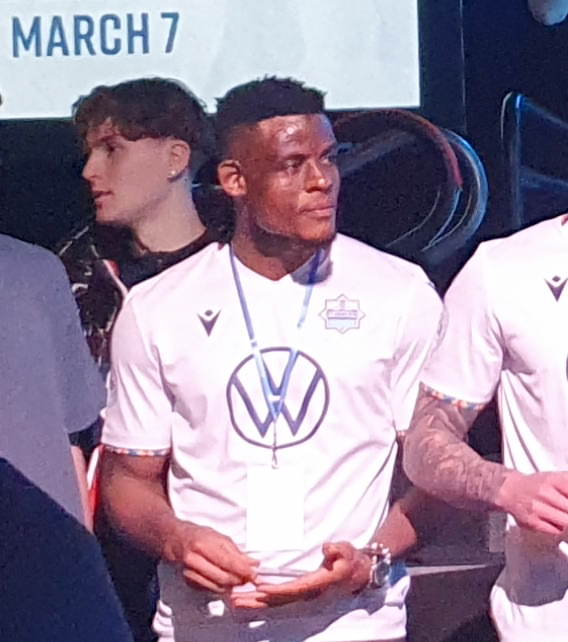

Personal information
- Full name: Kosisochukwu Nwafornso
- Date of birth: 19 September 1997 (age 29)
- Place of birth: Abuja, Nigeria
- Height: 6 ft 1 in (1.85 m)
- Position: Forward

Youth career
- Evergreen FC
- ANB Futbol

College career
Years	Team	Apps	(Gls)
2015–2018	St. Bonaventure Bonnies	65	(18)

Senior career*
Years	Team	Apps	(Gls)
2017	Charlotte Eagles	7	(0)
2018–2019	Colorado Pride Switchbacks U23	20	(10)
2021	Forge FC	0	(0)
2022	Vaughan Azzurri	11	(16)
2023	HFX Wanderers	7	(0)
Total		45	(26)
- * Club domestic league appearances and goals as of 19:57, 13 June 2023 (UTC)

Kosisochukwu Nwafornso (born 19 September 1997) is a Nigerian former footballer.

== Early life ==
Born in Nigeria, Nwafornso began playing soccer at a young age. He played with Evergreen FC in his native Nigeria. At age 17, he moved to Canada and joined ANB Futbol.

== College career ==
In 2015, Nwafornso began attending St. Bonaventure University, where he played for the men's soccer team. He scored his first collegiate goal on September 13, 2015, against the Detroit Mercy Titans in the Radisson Invitational, where he was also named to the Radisson Invitational All-Tournament Team. On October 21, 2015, he scored a brace in a 2–1 victory over the George Washington Colonials, which earned him Atlantic 10 Rookie of the Week honours. At the end of his freshman season, he was named to the Atlantic 10 Men's Soccer All-Rookie Team and was named to the TopDrawerSoccer's Freshman Top 100. In October 2018, he was named Atlantic 10 Men's Soccer Player Of The Week. In his senior season in 2018, Nwafornso scored a career-best nine goals and added four assists and was named to the Atlantic 10 All-Conference Second Team, Atlantic 10 Conference All-Academic Team, and Scholar All-East Region team. He was also a three time Atlantic 10 Commissioner's Honor Roll honoree from 2016 to 2018.

== Club career ==
In 2017, Nwafornso played with the Charlotte Eagles in the Premier Development League. With Charlotte, he won the PDL title.

In 2018 and 2019, he played with the Colorado Pride Switchbacks U23.

In June 2021, he signed a professional contract with Forge FC in the Canadian Premier League. However, he suffered an injury and was unable to appear for the club that season.

In 2022, he played with Vaughan Azzurri in League1 Ontario. He helped Vaughan capture the league title, scoring a hat trick in the championship final victory over Blue Devils FC, earning Finals MVP honours.

In February 2023, he joined HFX Wanderers FC in the Canadian Premier League, signing a one-year contract with club options for 2024 and 2025. He made his professional debut on 15 April 2023 against Atlético Ottawa. In June 2023, he terminated his contract with the club by mutual consent, at his request.

== Career statistics ==
As of match played 13 June 2023

Club	Season	League			Playoffs		Domestic Cup		Continental		Total	
Club	Season	Division	Apps	Goals	Apps	Goals	Apps	Goals	Apps	Goals	Apps	Goals
Charlotte Eagles	2017	Premier Development League	7	0	2	0	1	0	–		10	0
Colorado Pride Switchbacks U23	2018	Premier Development League	11	7	–		–		–		11	7
Colorado Pride Switchbacks U23	2019	USL League Two	9	3	1	0	–		–		10	3
Colorado Pride Switchbacks U23	Total		20	10	1	0	0	0	0	0	21	10
Forge FC	2021	Canadian Premier League	0	0	0	0	0	0	0	0	0	0
Vaughan Azzurri	2022	League1 Ontario	11	16	2	3	–		–		13	19
HFX Wanderers FC	2023	Canadian Premier League	7	0	0	0	1	0	–		8	0
Career total			45	26	5	3	2	0	0	0	52	29
