= Théo Collomb =

French footballer (born 1997)

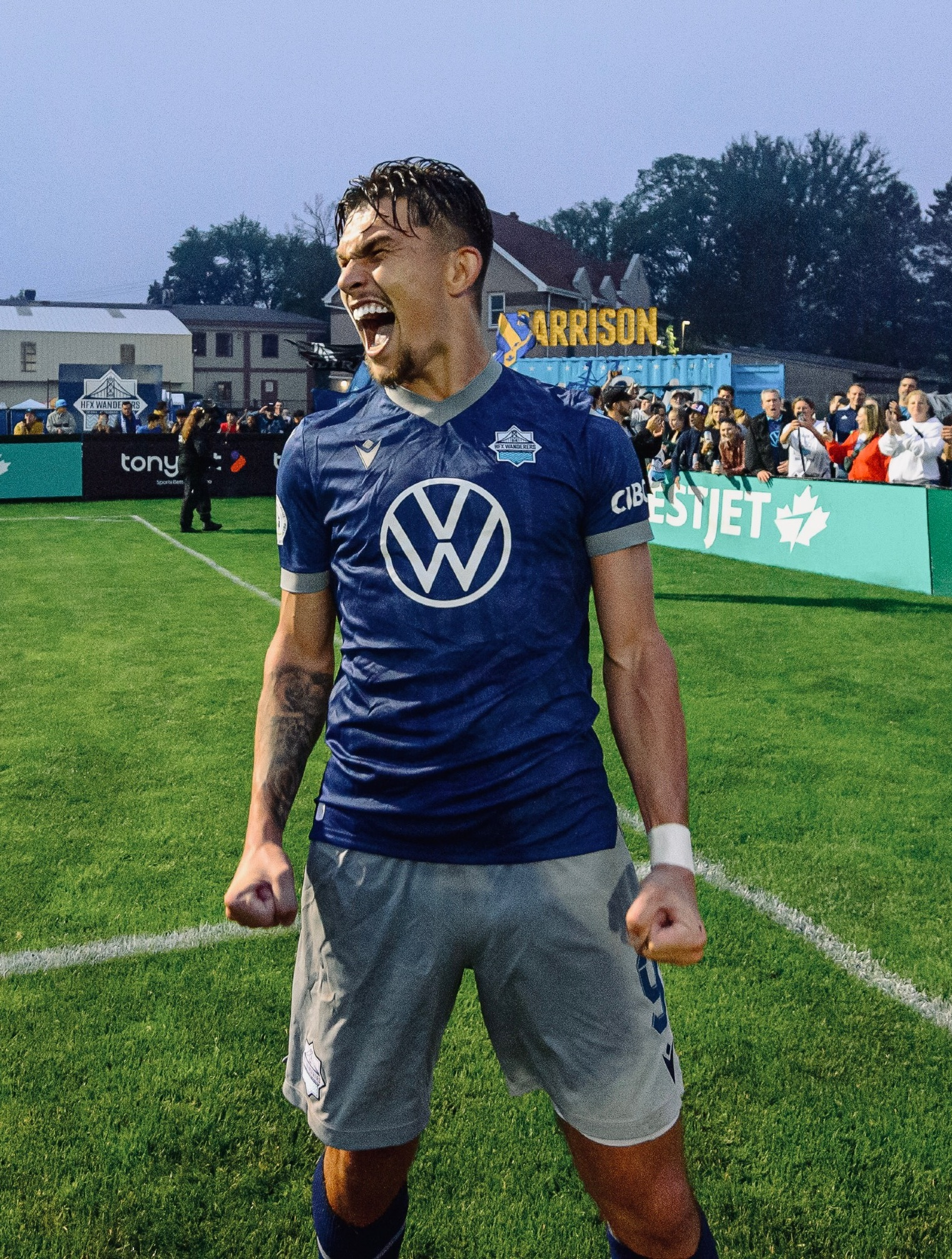
- Collomb with HFX Wanderers

Personal information
- Date of birth: 18 July 1997 (age 29)
- Place of birth: Clermont-Ferrand, France
- Height: 1.83 m (6 ft 0 in)
- Position: Forward

Team information
- Current team: Saint-Tropez
- Number: 9

Youth career
- –2015: Cournon-d'Auvergne
- 2015–2020: Clermont

College career
Years	Team	Apps	(Gls)
2020–2021	UNC Greensboro Spartans	31	(23)

Senior career*
Years	Team	Apps	(Gls)
2018–2020	Clermont II	30	(9)
2022	Whitecaps FC 2	9	(2)
2023	HFX Wanderers	13	(4)
2024–	FC US Saint-Tropez	17	(17)

International career^{‡}
2019	France Universiade	5	(0)
- * Club domestic league appearances and goals as of 9 September 2023 ‡ National team caps and goals as of 8 February 2023

Théo Collomb (born 18 July 1997) is a French professional footballer who plays as a forward for FC US Saint-Tropez.

== Early life ==
Collomb began his youth career with Cournon-d'Auvergne. In 2015, he joined the youth system of Clermont.

== College career ==
After speaking to a teammate on the French Universiade team who was playing in the American college system, Collomb sent highlight tapes to American universities to try to secure a scholarship. In 2020, he began attending the University of North Carolina at Greensboro, where he played for the men's soccer team. On 17 February 2021, he scored his first career collegiate goal and registered his first assist during a 4-1 victory over the Belmont Abbey Crusaders. In his freshman season in the 2021 spring season (which was delayed from the regular 2020 fall season due to the COVID-19 pandemic), he won the Southern Conference Tournament with the team. He was named to the South All-Region Third Team, was the SoCon co-Freshman of the Year, and was an All SoCon First Team selection and SoCon All-Freshman Team selection.

On 25 September 2021, he scored his first hat trick and also added two assists in a 7-1 victory over the VMI Keydets, which earned him all three major National Player of the Week Awards in the country. At the end of his sophomore season, he was named the SoCon Player of the Year. He was also named to the United Soccer Coaches All-America Second Team, as well as the College Soccer News All-America Second Team and the TopDrawerSoccer Best XI Third Team. After the season, he was invited to participate in the Major League Soccer College Showcase.

== Club career ==
In 2018, he began playing for Clermont II in the Championnat National 3. On 2 September 2018, he scored a hat trick in a 6-1 victory over Ytrac. He played three seasons with the Clermont second team, making 30 appearances, including 15 starts, scoring nine goals.

In January 2022, Collomb was selected 72nd overall in the 2022 MLS SuperDraft by Vancouver Whitecaps FC. In March 2022, he signed a professional contract with the Whitecaps second team, Whitecaps FC 2, in MLS Next Pro. On 17 June 2022, he scored a brace against North Texas SC in a 3-1 victory. However, his playing time that season was limited due to an injury and squad rotation.

In February 2023, he joined Canadian Premier League club HFX Wanderers FC on a one-year contract, with a club option for 2024. In December 2023, the Wanderers declined his option for 2024.

== International career ==
In 2019, he played for France at the 2019 FISU Universiade Games. In an exhibition match prior to the tournament, he scored the only goal in a 1-0 victory over the Ireland Universiade side.

== Career statistics ==
As of 9 September 2023

Appearances and goals by club, season and competition
Club	Season	League			Playoffs		Domestic Cup		Total	
Club	Season	Division	Apps	Goals	Apps	Goals	Apps	Goals	Apps	Goals
Clermont II	2017–18	Championnat National 3	1	0	—		—		1	0
Clermont II	2018–19	Championnat National 3	14	5	—		—		14	5
Clermont II	2019–20	Championnat National 3	15	4	—		—		15	4
Clermont II	Total		30	9	0	0	0	0	30	9
Whitecaps FC 2	2022	MLS Next Pro	9	2	—		—		9	2
HFX Wanderers FC	2023	Canadian Premier League	13	4	0	0	1	0	14	4
Career total			52	15	0	0	1	0	53	15
