= Ryan Robinson (Canadian soccer) =

Canadian soccer player (born 2001)

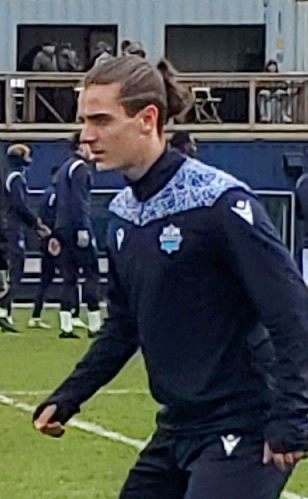
- Robinson with HFX Wanderers in 2022

Personal information
- Date of birth: June 30, 2001 (age 25)
- Place of birth: Hamilton, Ontario, Canada
- Height: 1.78 m (5 ft 10 in)
- Position: Forward

Team information
- Current team: Vaughan Azzurri
- Number: 14

Youth career
- –2014: Mount Hamilton YSC
- 2014–2021: Toronto FC

College career
Years	Team	Apps	(Gls)
2024–	York Lions	23	(4)

Senior career*
Years	Team	Apps	(Gls)
2018	Toronto FC III	8	(0)
2021	FC Manitoba	0	(0)
2021	Vaughan Azzurri	5	(4)
2022	HFX Wanderers	18	(0)
2023–	Vaughan Azzurri	55	(20)
- * Club domestic league appearances and goals as of August 24, 2025

Ryan Robinson (born June 30, 2001) is a Canadian professional soccer player who plays as a forward for Vaughan Azzurri in League1 Ontario.

== Early life ==
Robinson began playing soccer at age five. He played rep soccer with Mount Hamilton Youth SC in his youth years, before joining the Toronto FC Academy in 2014.

== University career ==
In 2024, he began attending York University, where he played for the men's soccer team. At the end of his first season, he was named an OUA West Second Team All-Star.

== Club career ==
While with the Toronto FC Academy, he played with Toronto FC III in League1 Ontario in 2018, making eight appearances.

In July 2021, Robinson signed with USL League Two side FC Manitoba, however, FC Manitoba was forced to withdraw from USL League Two due to the COVID-19 pandemic, instead playing a series of exhibition matches instead.

In October 2021, Robinson joined League1 Ontario side Vaughan Azzurri. On October 23, he scored a hat-trick against Unionville Milliken SC in a 5–1 victory.

In 2022, he went on trial with Valour FC in the Canadian Premier League, during their pre-season. Afterwards, he returned to Vaughan and during their pre-season, Robinson played in a friendly against Canadian Premier League side HFX Wanderers, and was subsequently invited to trial with the professional outfit during their preseason. After playing in all of the Wanderers' remaining pre-season matches, he signed his first professional contract with Wanderers on April 6, 2022, a one-year contract with options through 2024. He made his professional debut on April 7, coming on as a substitute against York United FC. He started his first match on May 7, against Valour FC.

In 2023, he returned to League1 Ontario with Vaughan Azzurri. In 2025, he was named a league Second Team All-Star.

== International career ==
In December 2015, he made his debut in the Canadian national program, attending a U14 identification camp.

== Career statistics ==
As of match played on August 27, 2025

Club	Season	League			Playoffs		Domestic Cup		League Cup		Total	
Club	Season	Division	Apps	Goals	Apps	Goals	Apps	Goals	Apps	Goals	Apps	Goals
Toronto FC III	2018	League1 Ontario	8	0	—		—		2	0	10	0
FC Manitoba	2021	—	—		—		—		—		—	
Vaughan Azzurri	2021	League1 Ontario	5	4	1	0	—		—		6	4
HFX Wanderers FC	2022	Canadian Premier League	18	0	—		2	0	—		20	0
Vaughan Azzurri	2023	League1 Ontario	20	6	2	1	1	0	—		23	7
Vaughan Azzurri	2024	League1 Ontario Premier	16	4	—		—		3	1	19	5
Vaughan Azzurri	2025	League1 Ontario Premier	19	10	—		—		4	1	23	11
Vaughan Azzurri	Total		55	20	2	1	1	0	7	2	65	23
Career total			86	24	3	1	3	0	9	2	101	27
