= Massimo Ferrin =

Canadian soccer player (born 1998)

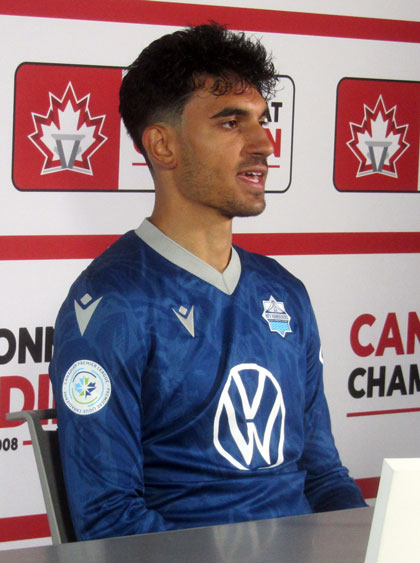
- Ferrin with HFX Wanderers FC in 2023

Personal information
- Date of birth: December 6, 1998 (age 27)
- Place of birth: Mississauga, Ontario, Canada
- Height: 5 ft 11 in (1.80 m)
- Positions: Forward; winger

Youth career
- Mississauga SC
- Vaughan Azzurri

College career
Years	Team	Apps	(Gls)
2016–2017	UAB Blazers	36	(8)
2018–2019	Syracuse Orange	38	(12)

Senior career*
Years	Team	Apps	(Gls)
2015–2016	Vaughan Azzurri	2	(0)
2018–2019	Vaughan Azzurri	8	(3)
2020–2021	Loudoun United	21	(0)
2022	Vaughan Azzurri	15	(23)
2023–2024	HFX Wanderers	52	(14)
2025	York United	25	(4)
2026–	Scrosoppi FC	1	(0)
- * Club domestic league appearances and goals as of April 26, 2026

Massimo Ferrin (born December 6, 1998) is a former Canadian professional soccer player

== Early life ==
Ferrin was born in Mississauga, Ontario. He began playing youth soccer at age five with Mississauga SC. Afterwards, he played youth soccer with Vaughan Azzurri.

== College career ==
In 2016, Ferrin began attending the University of Alabama at Birmingham, where he played for the men's soccer team. He scored his first collegiate goals on September 3, 2016, scoring twice in a 2–2 draw against the UNC Greensboro Spartans.

After his freshman season, he was named to the Conference USA All-Freshman Team. After his sophomore season, he was named the team's Most Valuable Player and was named a Conference USA Second-Team All-Star. During his time at UAB, he scored eight goals in two seasons.

In 2018, he transferred to Syracuse University to play for the men's soccer team. He made his debut on August 24, 2018, against the Oregon State Beavers. He scored his first goal for Syracuse on September 7, converting a penalty kick against the Notre Dame Fighting Irish.

On September 24, 2019, he scored the game-winning goal in a 1–0 victory over the Colgate Raiders. In his senior season, he was named to the All-ACC Men's Soccer Academic Team.

== Club career ==
=== Early career ===
In 2015 and 2016, Ferrin played with League 1 Ontario side Vaughan Azzurri. He also played with the side in 2018 and 2019.

=== Loudoun United ===
In February 2020, he signed with USL Championship side Loudoun United. He made his debut on July 20, 2020, starting against Hartford Athletic. In January 2021, he re-signed with the club for the 2021 season.

On July 14, 2021, he played with D.C. United, Loudoun's MLS affiliate, in a friendly against El Salvador club Alianza, scoring the only goal in a 1–0 victory.

=== Return to Vaughan Azzurri ===
In 2022, he returned to Vaughan Azzurri, scoring 23 goals in 15 league games. He helped Vaughan win the league championship and he was named league MVP, won the Golden Boot, and was a First Team All-Star.

=== HFX Wanderers ===
In December 2022, Ferrin joined Canadian Premier League club HFX Wanderers on a two-year contract through 2024, with an option for 2025. He made his debut for the club on April 15, 2023, against Atlético Ottawa.

He scored his first professional goal on April 19, in a 3-1 Canadian Championship loss to Atlético Ottawa, hitting the target directly from a free kick. He scored his first league goal in his next match against Forge FC to earn a 1–1 draw and earned CPL Team of the Week honours.

In his first season, he led the team in scoring with eight league goals (nine in all competitions), while also adding three assists, and at the end of the 2023, season, he was one of ten nominees for CPL Players’ Player of the Year award. Over his two seasons with the Wanderers, he was the most fouled player in the league with 137 fouls suffered and earned a league-high five penalty kicks.

=== York United ===
On February 3, 2025, Ferrin was sold to York United for an undisclosed fee. He signed a one-year contract with an club option for an additional year. He scored his first goal for the club on May 6, 2025, in a 2025 Canadian Championship match against FC Laval.

== International career ==
In 2015, he attended a camp with the Canada U18 team.

== Career statistics ==
As of match played October 27, 2025

Club	Season	League			Playoffs		Domestic Cup		Continental		Total	
Club	Season	Division	Apps	Goals	Apps	Goals	Apps	Goals	Apps	Goals	Apps	Goals
Vaughan Azzurri	2015	League1 Ontario	?	?	–		–		–		?	?
Vaughan Azzurri	2016	League1 Ontario	2	0	0	0	–		–		2	0
Vaughan Azzurri	2018	League1 Ontario	1	0	0	0	–		–		1	0
Vaughan Azzurri	2019	League1 Ontario	7	3	0	0	0	0	–		7	3
Vaughan Azzurri	Total		10+	3	0	0	0	0	0	0	10+	3
Loudoun United	2020	USL Championship	6	0	–		–		–		6	0
Loudoun United	2021	USL Championship	15	0	–		–		–		15	0
Loudoun United	Total		21	0	0	0	0	0	0	0	21	0
Vaughan Azzurri	2022	League1 Ontario	15	23	2	1	–		–		17	24
HFX Wanderers FC	2023	Canadian Premier League	25	8	1	0	1	1	–		27	9
HFX Wanderers FC	2024	Canadian Premier League	27	6	–		1	0	–		28	6
HFX Wanderers FC	Total		52	14	1	0	2	1	0	0	55	15
York United FC	2023	Canadian Premier League	25	4	2	0	3	2	–		30	6
Career total			123	44	5	1	5	3	0	0	133	48
