= Ludwig Kodjo Amla =

Danish footballer (born 2000)

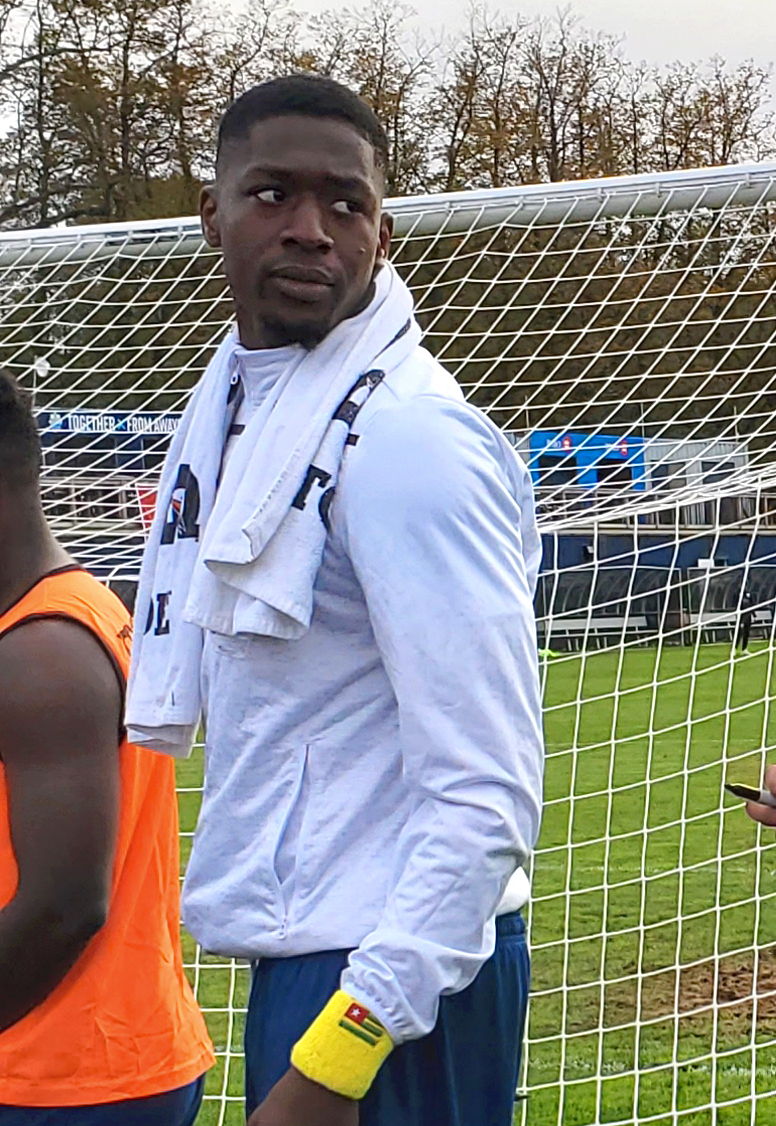
- Amla with HFX Wanderers

Personal information
- Full name: Kodjo Mavunio Ludwig Amla
- Date of birth: 13 November 2000 (age 25)
- Place of birth: Skjern, Denmark
- Height: 1.93 m (6 ft 4 in)
- Position: Forward

Team information
- Current team: CS St-Hubert

Youth career
- B.67
- 2011–2013: Cosmos de Granby
- 2014: CS Longueuil
- 2015–2016: FC Saint-Hyacinthe
- 2017: CS St-Hubert

College career
Years	Team	Apps	(Gls)
- Aigles du Collège Ahuntsic

Senior career*
Years	Team	Apps	(Gls)
2017–2020	CS St-Hubert	26	(10)
2021	Makedonija GP	10	(1)
2022	CS St-Hubert	5	(3)
2022–2023	HFX Wanderers	9	(0)
2025	FC Laval	9	(3)
2026–	CS St-Hubert	1	(0)
- * Club domestic league appearances and goals as of September 23, 2025

Kodjo Mavunio Ludwig Amla (born 13 November 2000) is a Danish professional footballer who plays for CS St-Hubert in Ligue1 Québec.

== Early life ==
Amla is of Togolese descent and was born in Skjern, Denmark, but grew up in Canada from a young age and holds a Canadian passport. He began playing football at the age of six with the B.67 soccer organization in Denmark. In 2011, he moved to Canada, where he played youth football with Cosmos de Granby, CS Longueuil, and FC Saint-Hyacinthe.

He played college soccer at Collège Ahuntsic. In 2018, he was named Championship MVP and was an RSEQ Division I regular season all-star and championship all-star, as his team won the gold medal. Soon after, he had offers to join American universities to play college soccer, but he elected to turn professional instead.

== Club career ==
He began his senior career with CS St-Hubert in the Première ligue de soccer du Québec.

In February 2021, he began training with Makedonija GP in the Macedonian First Football League. On 12 February, he signed a two-year contract with the club. He scored his first goal on March 6 against FK Sileks.

In 2022, he returned to CS St-Hubert. He scored a hat trick on 16 July against AS Blainville and scored two goals in a friendly against HFX Wanderers U23 on 27 July.

On 30 July 2022, he signed a contract through the 2023 season, with an option for 2024 with Canadian Premier League club HFX Wanderers FC, after trialing with the club for a couple of weeks and playing in the friendly against the HFX U23 side for his former club CS St-Hubert, in which he scored 2 goals in a 3–2 victory for St-Hubert. He made his debut for the Wanderers on August 1 against York United FC. On 15 June 2023, Amla was suspended by the Canadian Anti-Doping Program for a period of two years (backdated to the original Canadian Centre for Ethics in Sport notice of charge date) until 7 February 2025, with him being "unable to participate in any capacity in any sport that is a signatory to the CADP", due to testing positive for terbutaline, which was in his asthma inhaler. He had yet to feature with the club that season, as a result of the suspension while under appeal. Upon the suspension becoming official, Amla was put on the ineligible list and removed from the active roster.

== Career statistics ==
As of match played 23 September 2025

Club	Season	League			Playoffs		National cup		League cup		Total	
Club	Season	Division	Apps	Goals	Apps	Goals	Apps	Goals	Apps	Goals	Apps	Goals
CS St-Hubert	2017	Première ligue de soccer du Québec	5	1	—		—		1	0	6	1
CS St-Hubert	2018	Première ligue de soccer du Québec	14	6	—		—		1	1	16	7
CS St-Hubert	2019	Première ligue de soccer du Québec	5	2	—		—		0	0	5	2
CS St-Hubert	2020	Première ligue de soccer du Québec	2	1	—		—		—		2	1
CS St-Hubert	Total		26	10	0	0	0	0	2	1	28	11
Makedonija GP	2020–21	Macedonian First Football League	10	1	—		1	0	—		11	1
CS St-Hubert	2022	Première ligue de soccer du Québec	5	3	—		—		0	0	5	3
HFX Wanderers FC	2022	Canadian Premier League	9	0	—		0	0	—		9	0
HFX Wanderers FC	2023	Canadian Premier League	0	0	0	0	0	0	—		0	0
HFX Wanderers FC	Total		9	0	0	0	0	0	0	0	9	0
FC Laval	2025	Ligue1 Québec	9	3	–		1	0	1	0	11	3
Career total			59	17	0	0	2	0	3	1	64	18
