= 2022 League1 Ontario season =

League1 Ontario Men's Division
- Season: 2022
- Dates: April 21 – August 21 (Note: One match was played on August 27) (regular season); August 24 – September 3 (playoffs)
- Champions: Vaughan Azzurri
- Regular season champions: Vaughan Azzurri
- Matches: 231
- Goals: 830 (3.59 per match)
- Top goalscorer: Massimo Ferrin; Miles Green (23 goals each)

The 2022 Men's League1 Ontario season was the eighth season of play for League1 Ontario, a Division 3 men's soccer league in the Canadian soccer pyramid and the highest level of soccer based in the Canadian province of Ontario.

Vaughan Azzurri defeated Blue Devils FC in the final to win the league championship and qualified for the 2023 Canadian Championship. Guelph United F.C. represented the league in the 2022 Canadian Championship, as they were the 2021 league champions.

== Format and changes ==
The league returned to a single table format for the 2022 season with each team playing 21 games, following the 2021 season which was shortened due to the COVID-19 pandemic. The regular season ran for 18 weeks between April 21 and August 21 (one postponed match was later played on August 27). The top six teams qualified for the playoffs with the top two getting first round byes. The quarterfinals were held on August 24–25, the semifinals on August 27–28, and the championship final on September 3, which is Labour Day weekend.

With the league set to split into a multi-division format with promotion and relegation beginning in 2024, the points obtained in this season contribute to the assignment of clubs in 2024. The points from the 2022 season (weighted at 75%) will be added to the points teams obtain in the 2023 season (weighted at 100%) to determine the placements.

== Clubs ==
The men's division grew to 22 teams through expansion. Burlington SC, Electric City FC and Simcoe County Rovers joined the league as expansion teams, Pickering FC returned from hiatus and played their first season under their new name, having re-branded after the 2019 season, while Toronto Skillz FC has left the league. Hamilton United, St. Catharines Roma Wolves, and BVB IA Waterloo (formerly Waterloo United) made their official Premier Division debuts, after having opted out of the main division last season, having fielded teams in either the short-season Summer Championship or Reserve divisions instead. 1812 FC Barrie departed the league after playing in the Premier Division last year, as well as Toronto Skillz FC who played in the 2021 L1O Summer Championship and Aurora FC who were on hiatus and joined the Simcoe County Rovers group, also officially departed.

The following clubs participated in the league.

Team	City	Principal stadium	Head coach
Alliance United FC	Toronto	Centennial College/Varsity Stadium	Ilya Orlov
Blue Devils FC	Oakville	Sheridan College Trafalgar	Duncan Wilde
Burlington SC	Burlington	Haber Centre	Mark Worton
BVB IA Waterloo	Waterloo	Warrior Field, University of Waterloo	Jordan Brown
Darby FC	Whitby	Whitby Soccer Centre	Jens Kraemer
Electric City FC	Peterborough	Fleming College Sports Complex	Randy Ribeiro (interim)
Guelph United F.C.	Guelph	Alumni Stadium	Keith Mason & Justin Springer
Hamilton United	Hamilton	Ron Joyce Stadium	Kamran Derayeh
FC London	London	Portuguese Club of London	Ruben Quintão
Master's Futbol	Scarborough (Toronto)	L'Amoreaux Park	Junior Groves
North Mississauga SC	Mississauga	Churchill Meadows	Peyvand Mossavat & Raman Mohammadi
North Toronto Nitros	Toronto	Downsview Park	Marko Milanović
Pickering FC	Pickering	Pickering Soccer Centre/Kinsmen Park	Aleks Balda
ProStars FC	Brampton	Victoria Park Stadium	John Yacou
Scrosoppi FC	Milton	Bishop Reding	Shayne Griffin
Sigma FC	Mississauga	Paramount Fine Foods Centre	John Zervos
Simcoe County Rovers FC	Barrie	J.C Massie Field, Georgian College	Jason Beckford
St. Catharines Roma Wolves	St. Catharines	Roma Park – Under Armour Field	Federico Turriziani
Unionville Milliken SC	Unionville (Markham)	Bill Crothers	Filipe Bento
Vaughan Azzurri	Vaughan	North Maple Regional Park	Patrice Gheisar
Windsor TFC	Amherstburg	Libro Centre	Valtar Cosenza
Woodbridge Strikers	Woodbridge (Vaughan)	Vaughan Grove	Peter Pinizzotto

=== In-season coaching changes ===
Team	Outgoing manager	Manner of departure	Date of vacancy	Incoming manager	Ref
Electric City FC	Jamie Sherwood	Mutual termination	May 20, 2022	Randy Ribeiro (interim)	
Master's FA	Rick Titus	Resigned	June 1, 2022	Junior Groves	

== Premier Division ==
Pos	Team	Pld	W	D	L	GF	GA	GD	Pts	Qualification
1	Vaughan Azzurri (C)	21	18	3	0	76	25	+51	57	Playoff semifinals
2	Blue Devils FC	21	14	5	2	54	16	+38	47	Playoff semifinals
3	Alliance United FC	21	13	6	2	43	15	+28	45	Playoff quarterfinals
4	North Toronto Nitros	21	13	5	3	37	19	+18	44	Playoff quarterfinals
5	Simcoe County Rovers FC	21	13	5	3	37	23	+14	44	Playoff quarterfinals
6	ProStars FC	21	14	1	6	58	37	+21	43	Playoff quarterfinals
7	Guelph United F.C.	21	13	3	5	42	25	+17	42	
8	Hamilton United	21	10	1	10	50	45	+5	31	
9	Sigma FC	21	9	4	8	36	27	+9	31	
10	Electric City FC	21	8	6	7	29	23	+6	30	
11	Woodbridge Strikers	21	8	5	8	42	36	+6	29	
12	Scrosoppi FC	21	9	1	11	42	41	+1	28	
13	Darby FC	21	7	4	10	23	29	−6	25	
14	Pickering FC	21	7	2	12	30	40	−10	23	
15	BVB IA Waterloo	21	7	1	13	43	59	−16	22	
16	St. Catharines Roma Wolves	21	5	5	11	21	36	−15	20	
17	Burlington SC	21	4	7	10	36	53	−17	19	
18	Windsor TFC	21	5	3	13	21	40	−19	18	
19	Master's FA	21	4	5	12	33	59	−26	17	
20	Unionville Milliken SC	21	4	2	15	25	64	−39	14	
21	North Mississauga SC	21	4	2	15	25	66	−41	14	
22	FC London	21	2	4	15	27	52	−25	10	

Source: League1 Ontario
Rules for classification: 1) points; 2) total wins; 3) goal differential; 4) goals for; 5) away goals differential; 6) away goals for; 7) home goals differential; 8) home goals for; 9) head-to-head record; 10) coin toss or drawing of lots.
(C) Champions

=== Playoffs ===
Quarterfinals
4	North Toronto Nitros	0
5	Simcoe County Rovers FC	2
3	Alliance United FC	4
6	ProStars FC	0

Semifinals
1	Vaughan Azzurri	2
5	Simcoe County Rovers FC	1
2	Blue Devils FC	3
3	Alliance United FC	2

Finals
1	Vaughan Azzurri	5
2	Blue Devils FC	1

Quarter-finals

August 24, 2022	North Toronto Nitros	0–2	Simcoe County Rovers FC	Toronto, Ontario
8:00 PM		Report	Wishart 83'; Beckford 88'	Stadium: Downsview Park; Attendance: ~250; Referee: Brian Butler

August 25, 2022	Alliance United FC	4–0	ProStars FC	Vaughan, Ontario
9:00 PM	N.Sivananthan 7', 72'; A.Sivananthan 28', 67'			Stadium: Vaughan Grove Park; Attendance: ~200; Referee: Nivan Raizada

Semi-finals

August 27, 2022	Vaughan Azzurri	2–1	Simcoe County Rovers FC	Vaughan, Ontario
7:00 PM	Carreiro 48'; Benítez 76'	Report	Beckford 12'	Stadium: North Maple Regional Park; Attendance: ~200; Referee: Kevin McEleleney

August 28, 2022	Blue Devils FC	3–2	Alliance United FC	Oakville, Ontario
4:00 PM	Santos 18'; Ellis 35'; Ilyas 72'	Report	Tesker 6'; Gardner 68'	Stadium: Bronte Athletic Park; Attendance: ~200; Referee: Scott Bowman

Final

September 3, 2022	Vaughan Azzurri	5–1	Blue Devils FC	Vaughan, Ontario
1:00 PM	Mills 16'; Nwafornso 30', 45+1', 48'; Ferrin 43' (pen.)	Report	Ilyass 45+4'	Stadium: Ontario Soccer Centre; Attendance: ~1200; Referee: Ryan Schwenger

=== Statistics ===
==== Top goalscorers ====
Rank	Player	Club	Goals
1	Massimo Ferrin	Vaughan Azzurri	23
1	Miles Green	Hamilton United	23
3	Taha Ilyass	Blue Devils FC	19
4	Ameer Kinani	ProStars FC	17
5	Kosi Nwafornso	Vaughan Azzurri	16
6	Ethan Beckford	Simcoe County Rovers	15
7	Augustus Oku	Burlington SC	14
8	Jevontae Layne	Scrosoppi FC	11
8	Jordan Brown	Electric City	11
8	Amir Shirazi	Hamilton United	11
8	Atchuthan Sivananthan	Alliance United	11

Updated to end of regular season. Source: League1 Ontario

==== Top goalkeepers ====
Rank	Player	Club	Minutes	GAA
1	Praveen Ahilan	Alliance United	1710	0.74
2	Lucas Birnstingl	Blue Devils FC	1620	0.83
3	Ali Ghazanfari-Moghaddan	North Toronto Nitros	1485	0.85
4	Ricky Gomes	Simcoe County Rovers	1305	0.97
5	Quillan Roberts	Electric City FC	1530	1.12

Updated to end of regular season. Minimum 900 minutes played. Source:

=== League honours ===
==== Awards ====
Award	Player	Team	Ref
Most Valuable Player	Massimo Ferrin	Vaughan Azzurri	
Young Player of the Year (U20)	Markiyan Voytsekhovskyy	ProStars FC	
Coach of the Year	Patrice Gheisar	Vaughan Azzurri	
Goalkeeper of the Year	Praveen Ahilan	Alliance United	
Defender of the Year	Amardo Oakley	Guelph United F.C.	
Midfielder of the Year	Nikola Stakic	Alliance United	
Forward of the Year	Miles Green	Hamilton United	
Golden Boot	Massimo Ferrin	Vaughan Azzurri	

==== League All-Stars ====
The following players were named League1 Ontario Premier Division All-Stars for the 2022 season:

First Team All-Stars

Player	Position
Praveen Ahilan (Alliance United)	Goalkeeper
Amardo Oakley (Guelph United)	Defender
Kenny Lioutas (Alliance United)	Defender
Justyn Thomas (Vaughan Azzurri)	Defender
Nirun Sivananthan (Alliance United)	Defender
Markiyan Voytsekhovskyy (ProStars)	Midfielder
Nikola Stakic (Alliance United)	Midfielder
Andron Kagramanyan (Vaughan Azzurri)	Midfielder
Taha Ilyass (Blue Devils)	Forward
Miles Green (Hamilton United)	Forward
Massimo Ferrin (Vaughan Azzurri)	Forward

Second Team All-Stars

Player	Position
Ali Ghazanfari-Moghaddan (North Toronto)	Goalkeeper
Riley Ferrazzo (Vaughan Azzurri)	Defender
Oluwaseun Oyegunle (Sigma)	Defender
Matthew Chandler (Blue Devils)	Defender
Terrell Spencer (Masters FA)	Defender
Alexander Zis (ProStars/Guelph)	Midfielder
Liam Salmon (Pickering)	Midfielder
Brandon Duarte (Blue Devils)	Midfielder
Raheem Rose (Vaughan Azzurri)	Forward
Ethan Beckford (Simcoe County)	Forward
Farris Ammari (ProStars)	Forward

Third Team All-Stars

Player	Position
Quillan Roberts (Electric City)	Goalkeeper
Anthony Stolar (Scrosoppi)	Defender
Christian Westlaken (North Toronto)	Defender
Conrad Czarnecki (St. Catharines)	Defender
Zachary Ellis-Hayden (Electric City)	Defender
Jack Sears (Guelph United)	Midfielder
Tim Mahabir (Unionville Milliken)	Midfielder
Santiago Fonseca (London)	Midfielder
Wesley Cain (BVB Waterloo)	Forward
Augustus Oku (Burlington)	Forward
Abdou Raouf Mohamed (Woodbridge)	Forward

The following players were named League1 Ontario Premier Division U20 All-Stars for the 2022 season:

U20 All-Star Team

Player	Position
Christian Calabro (Vaughan Azzurri)	Goalkeeper
Anthony Stolar (Scrosoppi)	Defender
Oluwaseun Oyegunle (Sigma)	Defender
Nikolas Antolcic (BVB Waterloo)	Defender
Mateo Goldsztein-Herrera (London)	Midfielder
Juan Delgadillo (North Toronto)	Midfielder
Santino De Bartolo (Woodbridge)	Midfielder
Markiyan Voytsekhovskyy (ProStars)	Midfielder
Mohamed Alshakman (Sigma)	Midfielder
Ryley Wishart (Simcoe County)	Forward
Kai Garvey (Sigma)	Forward

== U21 Reserve Division ==
The Reserve Division will return with each Premier Division club fielding one or more teams, as well as some other OPDL clubs that do not operate a League1 Ontario team.

=== North Division ===
Pos	Team	Pld	W	D	L	GF	GA	GD	Pts	Qualification
1	Simcoe County Rovers FC U21 (C)	11	11	0	0	49	7	+42	33	Advance to playoffs
2	Aurora FC	12	8	1	3	38	22	+16	25	
3	Master's FA U21 North	12	7	1	4	21	16	+5	22	
4	Alliance United FC U21	12	6	1	5	22	24	−2	19	
5	Unionville Milliken SC U21	11	5	1	5	29	26	+3	16	
6	Richmond Hill SC	12	4	1	7	14	26	−12	13	
7	Rush Canada Academy	12	2	2	8	19	40	−21	8	
8	Darby FC U21 North	12	0	1	11	12	43	−31	1	

Source: League1 Ontario
(C) Champions

=== West Division ===
Pos	Team	Pld	W	D	L	GF	GA	GD	Pts	Qualification
1	Tecumseh SC	12	11	1	0	44	8	+36	34	Advance to playoffs
2	Guelph United F.C. U21	12	8	3	1	32	9	+23	27	
3	Cambridge United	12	7	2	3	25	16	+9	23	
4	Whitecaps London	12	7	2	3	20	13	+7	23	
5	FC London U21	12	5	0	7	22	21	+1	15	
6	Windsor TFC U21	12	2	1	9	18	41	−23	7	
7	St. Catharines Roma Wolves U21	12	1	3	8	12	26	−14	6	
8	BVB IA Waterloo U21	12	0	2	10	11	50	−39	2	

Source: League1 Ontario

=== Central Division ===
Pos	Team	Pld	W	D	L	GF	GA	GD	Pts	Qualification
1	Scrosoppi FC U21	12	10	2	0	35	9	+26	32	Advance to playoffs
2	Sigma FC U21	12	7	3	2	30	14	+16	24	
3	Blue Devils FC U21	12	5	2	5	23	20	+3	17	
4	Hamilton United U21	12	4	3	5	15	12	+3	15	
5	North Mississauga SC U21	12	3	5	4	17	20	−3	14	
6	ProStars FC U21	12	3	4	5	14	19	−5	13	
7	Oakville SC	12	4	0	8	15	35	−20	12	
8	Burlington SC U21	12	2	1	9	12	32	−20	7	

Source: League1 Ontario

=== East Division ===
Pos	Team	Pld	W	D	L	GF	GA	GD	Pts	Qualification
1	North Toronto Nitros U21	12	9	1	2	43	12	+31	28	Advance to playoffs
2	Vaughan Azzurri U21	12	7	5	0	38	16	+22	26	
3	Woodbridge Strikers U21	12	7	3	2	36	14	+22	24	
4	FC Durham	12	4	2	6	18	26	−8	14	
5	Master's FA U21 East	11	3	3	5	15	22	−7	12	
6	Toronto Skillz FC	12	3	3	6	13	22	−9	12	
7	Brampton SC	11	2	2	7	16	41	−25	8	
8	Darby FC U21 East	12	2	1	9	12	38	−26	7	

Source: League1 Ontario

=== Playoffs ===
Semifinals
N1	Simcoe County Rovers U21	3
E1	North Toronto Nitros U21	1
W1	Tecumseh SC	1
C1	Scrosoppi FC U21	2

Championship Game
N1	Simcoe County Rovers U21	4
C1	Scrosoppi FC U21	1

== U19 Reserve Division ==
The team in the U19 reserve division played each team in their own division twice, plus some teams from the opposing division once for a 20-game schedule.

=== Central Division ===
Pos	Team	Pld	W	D	L	GF	GA	GD	Pts	Qualification
1	Vaughan Azzurri U19 (C)	20	16	3	1	69	14	+55	51	Advance to playoffs
2	North Toronto Nitros U19	20	14	3	3	52	26	+26	45	Advance to playoffs
3	Woodbridge Strikers U19	20	12	1	7	50	29	+21	37	
4	Sigma FC U19	20	9	3	8	49	41	+8	30	
5	Alliance United FC U19	20	5	6	9	30	40	−10	21	
6	North Mississauga SC U19	20	4	4	12	37	64	−27	16	
7	Unionville Milliken SC U19	20	3	6	11	42	77	−35	15	
8	FC Durham U19	20	2	3	15	26	73	−47	9	

Source: League1 Ontario
(C) Champions

=== West Division ===
Pos	Team	Pld	W	D	L	GF	GA	GD	Pts	Qualification
1	Rush Canada Academy U19	20	14	2	4	54	26	+28	44	Advance to playoffs
2	ProStars FC U19	20	14	0	6	60	31	+29	42	Advance to playoffs
3	Hamilton United U19	20	12	3	5	42	27	+15	39	
4	Guelph United F.C. U19	20	8	3	9	48	39	+9	27	
5	Blue Devils FC U19	20	7	3	10	32	39	−7	24	
6	Simcoe County Rovers FC U19	20	7	3	10	46	49	−3	24	
7	Scrosoppi FC U19	20	5	2	13	29	64	−35	17	
8	Tecumseh SC U19	20	4	3	13	28	55	−27	15	

Source: League1 Ontario

=== Playoffs ===
Semifinals
C1	Vaughan Azzurri U19	3
W2	ProStars FC U19	1
W1	Rush Canada Academy U19	4
C2	North Toronto Nitros U19	2

Championship Game
C1	Vaughan Azzurri U19	3
W1	Rush Canada Academy U19	0
