= Obeng Tabi =

Canadian professional soccer player

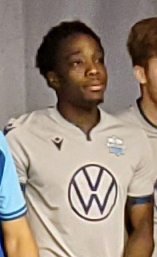
- Tabi in 2022

Personal information
- Full name: Obeng Tabi Amponsah
- Date of birth: October 28, 2000 (age 26)
- Place of birth: Laval, Quebec, Canada
- Height: 1.82 m (6 ft 0 in)
- Position: Left back

Team information
- Current team: CS St-Laurent

Youth career
- FS Salaberry
- 2019: CS St-Laurent
- 2021: CS Étoiles de l'Est

College career
Years	Team	Apps	(Gls)
2020–2021	LSU Eunice Bengals	25	(0)
2024–	Concordia Stingers	10	(0)

Senior career*
Years	Team	Apps	(Gls)
2022	HFX Wanderers FC	19	(0)
2023–2024	CS St-Laurent	34	(0)
2025	FC Laval	15	(3)
2026–	CS St-Laurent	1	(0)

International career^{‡}
2024–	Canada (futsal)	2	(0)
- * Club domestic league appearances and goals as of September 23, 2025 ‡ National team caps and goals as of April 14, 2024

Obeng Tabi Amponsah (born October 28, 2000) is a Canadian professional soccer player who plays for CS St-Laurent in Ligue1 Québec.

== Early life ==
He played youth soccer with FS Salaberry. In 2019, he played in the U21 LSEQ with CS St-Laurent. In 2021, he played at the senior amateur level in the LSEQ with CS Étoiles de l'Est.

== College career ==
Tabi played college soccer at the junior college level for Louisiana State University Eunice in 2020 and 2021. In 2021, as a sophomore, he was named an NJCAA Third Team All-American, after contributing three assists in 14 starts with LSU Eunice.

In 2024, he began attending Concordia University in Canada, where he played for the men's soccer team.

== Club career ==
In January 2022, he signed a deal with HFX Wanderers FC of the Canadian Premier League. He made his professional debut in the Wanderers' first game of the season against York United, making an impact by preventing a clear scoring chance from York at the end of the first half. At the end of the season, HFX declined Tabi's contract option for the 2023 season.

In 2023, he played for CS St-Laurent in Ligue1 Québec, winning the league and cup double.

In 2025, he joined FC Laval.

== International career ==
In December 2022 and December 2023, Tabi was called up to camps with the Canada national futsal team. In April 2024, he was named to the roster for the 2024 CONCACAF Futsal Championship.

== Career statistics ==
As of September 29, 2025

Club	League	Season	League		Playoffs		Domestic Cup		League Cup		Total	
Club	League	Season	Apps	Goals	Apps	Goals	Apps	Goals	Apps	Goals	Apps	Goals
HFX Wanderers FC	Canadian Premier League	2022	19	0	—		0	0	—		19	0
CS St-Laurent	Ligue1 Québec	2023	20	0	—		—		3	0	23	0
CS St-Laurent	Ligue1 Québec	2024	14	0	—		3	0	2	0	19	0
CS St-Laurent	Total		34	0	0	0	3	0	5	0	42	0
FC Laval	2025	Ligue1 Québec	15	3	–		1	0	1	0	17	3
Career total			68	3	0	0	4	0	6	0	78	3
