= Ethan Beckford =

Canadian soccer player (born 1999)

Personal information
- Full name: Ethan Eamon Beckford
- Date of birth: 21 June 1999 (age 27)
- Place of birth: Manchester, England
- Height: 1.80 m (5 ft 11 in)
- Position: Forward

Team information
- Current team: Vaughan Azzurri

Youth career
- 2012–2015: Richmond Hill SC
- 2015–2017: Toronto FC

College career
Years	Team	Apps	(Gls)
2017–2018	Penn State Nittany Lions	33	(7)

Senior career*
Years	Team	Apps	(Gls)
2016–2017	Toronto FC III	34	(21)
2016	Toronto FC II	3	(0)
2019–2020	Curzon Ashton	1	(0)
2020–2021	Hyde United	1	(0)
2021	Ramsbottom United	1	(0)
2021	→ Ashton Athletic (loan)	12	(11)
2021–2022	Irlam	8	(3)
2022	Simcoe County Rovers	17	(15)
2023	Cavalry FC	14	(0)
2024	Havant & Waterlooville	7	(0)
2024	Atherton Collieries	2	(1)
2024	Hanley Town	2	(0)
2025–	Vaughan Azzurri	20	(5)
- * Club domestic league appearances and goals as of July 25, 2026

Ethan Beckford (born 21 June 1999) is an English footballer who plays as a forward for Vaughan Azzurri in League1 Ontario.

Born in Manchester, England into a family of former professional footballers, he joined Toronto FC in 2015 and was put into the club's Academy. He also played for Toronto FC II in 2016, before entering Pennsylvania State University the following year. He spent two years in college and represented Penn State Nittany Lions. He joined English non-league club Curzon Ashton in December 2019.

== Early life ==
Beckford played for Richmond Hill SC, where in two seasons won the Coupe Quebec-Ontario Cup championship, secured a silver medal at the Ontario Summer Games, made the Ontario Indoor Cup finals, and claimed back to back championships in the Ontario Youth Soccer League. He joined the Toronto FC Academy in February 2016

== College career ==
In fall of 2017, Beckford went to play college soccer at Pennsylvania State University. He played two seasons with the Nittany Lions, scoring seven goals and tallying one assist in 33 appearances. During his time with Penn State, Beckford was named to the Big Ten All Freshman team in 2017. In early 2019, Beckford opted to leave Penn State to pursue a professional career in Europe.

== Club career ==
While in the Toronto FC academy, Beckford was called up to the Toronto FC II squad during the 2016 USL season. Beckford made his professional debut on 25 May 2016, in a 2–1 defeat to Harrisburg City Islanders. He also played with the TFC Academy in the USL League Two and League1 Ontario during 2016 and 2017.

On 2 December 2019, Beckford joined National League North side Curzon Ashton. He played a total of 16 minutes for the "Nash" in one league and one FA Trophy game. He had a trial at Port Vale in August 2020.

On 3 November 2020, Beckford signed with Northern Premier League side Hyde United. He only made a single appearance for the club.

Beckford signed with Ramsbottom United in the summer of 2021. Beckford joined North West Counties Football League Premier Division side Ashton Athletic on loan in late August 2021, going on to bag 11 goals in 13 appearances in league and cup.

In November 2021, Beckford changed clubs in the NWCFL Premier Division, joining Irlam.

In 2022, he joined Simcoe County Rovers in League1 Ontario, joining his father, who was named the team's head coach. He scored 15 goals in 17 league appearances, adding another two goals in two playoff games.

In January 2023, Beckford signed with Canadian Premier League side Cavalry FC .

In February 2024, Beckford signed with to English club Havant & Waterlooville in the National League South, making his debut on 3 February 2024 against Chelmsford City.

On 30 March 2024, he joined Northern Premier League Premier Division club Atherton Collieries.

In 2025, he played with Vaughan Azzurri in League1 Ontario.

== Personal life ==
Ethan is from a family of former professional footballers, including his father Jason Beckford, uncle Darren Beckford and cousin Danny Webber. Through his father, he is of Jamaican descent.

== Career statistics ==
As of match played March 23, 2024

Appearances and goals by club, season and competition
Club	Season	League			National Cup		League Cup		Other		Total	
Club	Season	Division	Apps	Goals	Apps	Goals	Apps	Goals	Apps	Goals	Apps	Goals
Toronto FC III	2016	Premier Development League	11	1	—		—		—		11	1
Toronto FC III	2016	League1 Ontario	11	9	—		1	1	—		12	10
Toronto FC III	2017	League1 Ontario	12	11	—		?	?	—		12	11
Toronto FC III	Total		34	21	0	0	1	1	0	0	34	21
Toronto FC II	2016	United Soccer League	3	0	—		—		—		3	0
Curzon Ashton	2019–20	National League North	1	0	0	0	0	0	1 (Note: Appearance(s) in FA Trophy)	0	2	0
Simcoe County Rovers	2022	League1 Ontario	17	15	0	0	0	0	2	2	19	17
Cavalry FC	2023	Canadian Premier League	14	0	1	0	0	0	0	0	15	0
Havant & Waterlooville	2023-24	National League South	7	0	0	0	0	0	0	0	7	0
Atherton Collieries	2023-24	Northern Premier League	2	1	0	0	0	0	0	0	2	1
Career total			78	38	1	0	1	1	1	0	75	39
