= Eriks Santos =

Brazilian footballer (born 1996)

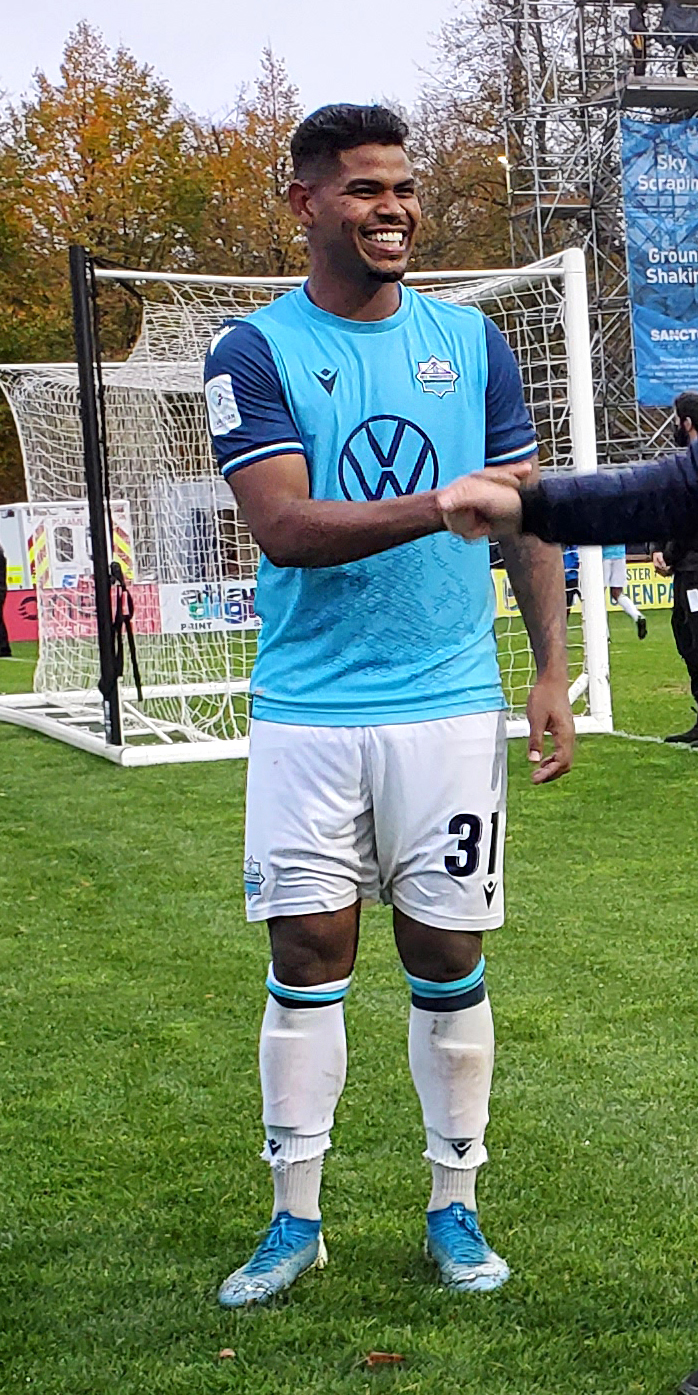
- Santos with HFX Wanderers in 2021

Personal information
- Full name: Eriks de Souza Santos Pereira
- Date of birth: 23 February 1996 (age 30)
- Place of birth: Pedreiras, Brazil
- Height: 1.82 m (6 ft 0 in)
- Position: Centre-back

Team information
- Current team: Narva Trans
- Number: 12

Youth career
- 2014–2017: Internacional

Senior career*
Years	Team	Apps	(Gls)
2017	Mariupol	1	(0)
2018–2019	Dila Gori	37	(0)
2020–2022	HFX Wanderers	42	(1)
2023–2024	Hibernians	9	(0)
2024–	Narva Trans	75	(2)

International career^{‡}
2016	Brazil U20		
- * Club domestic league appearances and goals as of 17 November 2026 ‡ National team caps and goals as of 24 April 2019

Eriks de Souza Santos Pereira (born 23 February 1996) is a Brazilian professional footballer who plays as a centre-back for Meistriliiga club Narva Trans.

== Early life ==
Santos is a product of Sport Club Internacional youth sportive system. During 2015–2017 he played for this club in the youth level.

== Club career ==
In August 2017, Santos signed a two-year deal with Ukrainian Premier League side FC Mariupol. On 25 October 2017, he made his professional debut as a starter in the Ukrainian Cup against Tavriya Simferopol. On 5 November 2017, he made his league debut as a substitute in a 3–1 loss to Shakhtar Donetsk.

In July 2018, Santos signed with Georgian Erovnuli Liga side Dila Gori, and made fourteen league appearances that season and one appearance in the Georgian Cup. The following season, he made 23 league appearances and one in the Georgian Cup.

On 25 February 2020, Santos signed with Canadian Premier League side HFX Wanderers. However, due to travel restrictions caused by the COVID-19 pandemic, he was unable to join the club for the 2020 season, finally joining the club in May 2021 for pre-season training for the 2021 season. In January 2022, Santos had his club option exercised by HFX, keeping him at the club through 2022. After the conclusion of the 2022 CPL season, Santos' contract option was declined by the Wanderers, ending his time at the club.

In July 2023, he signed with Maltese Premier League club Hibernians.

In July 2024, he signed with Narva Transin the Estonian Meistriliiga.

== Career statistics ==
As of 28 January 2024

Appearances and goals by club, season and competition
Club	Season	League			National cup (Note: Includes Ukrainian Cup, Georgian Cup)		Other		Total	
Club	Season	Division	Apps	Goals	Apps	Goals	Apps	Goals	Apps	Goals
Mariupol	2017–18	Ukrainian Premier League	1	0	1	0	0	0	2	0
Dila Gori	2018	Erovnuli Liga	14	0	1	0	0	0	15	0
Dila Gori	2019	Erovnuli Liga	23	0	1	0	0	0	24	0
Dila Gori	Total		37	0	2	0	0	0	39	0
HFX Wanderers	2020	Canadian Premier League	0	0	—		0	0	0	0
HFX Wanderers	2021	Canadian Premier League	18	0	2	0	—		20	0
HFX Wanderers	2022	Canadian Premier League	24	1	1	0	—		25	1
HFX Wanderers	Total		42	1	3	0	0	0	45	1
Hibernians	2023–24	Maltese Premier League	9	0	1	0	0	0	10	0
Career total			89	1	7	0	0	0	96	1

== Honours ==
HFX Wanderers

- Canadian Premier League runner-up: 2020
