= Cristian Campagna =

Canadian soccer player (born 2001)

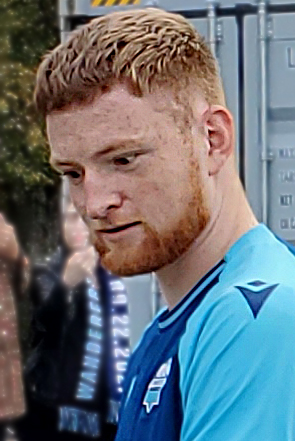
- Campagna with HFX Wanderers FC

Personal information
- Full name: Cristian Luca Campagna
- Date of birth: November 29, 2001 (age 24)
- Place of birth: Vancouver, British Columbia, Canada
- Height: 1.86 m (6 ft 1 in)
- Position: Defender

Team information
- Current team: Narva Trans
- Number: 5

Youth career
- Surrey United SC
- Vancouver Whitecaps

College career
Years	Team	Apps	(Gls)
2021	Albany Great Danes	9	(0)

Senior career*
Years	Team	Apps	(Gls)
2022	Whitecaps FC 2	19	(0)
2022–2023	HFX Wanderers	17	(0)
2024	Jazz	17	(3)
2025–	Narva Trans	64	(3)
- * Club domestic league appearances and goals as of November 13, 2026

Cristian Luca Campagna (born November 29, 2001) is a Canadian soccer player who plays for Estonian Meistriliiga club Narva Trans.

== Early life ==
Born in Vancouver, he moved to nearby Surrey at age 2, where he began playing soccer at age four with Surrey United SC. In August 2015, he joined the Vancouver Whitecaps FC Academy and began playing for the Vancouver Whitecaps U23 in 2021.

== College career ==
In June 2020, he committed to the University at Albany, SUNY to play for the men's soccer team. He made his debut on February 19, 2021 against the Syracuse Orange. After starting all nine games, he was named an America East All-Rookie selection. He was also named to the FTF Canada All-Freshman First Team. He departed Albany after one season.

== Club career ==
In March 2022, he signed a professional contract with Whitecaps FC 2 in MLS Next Pro. He made his professional debut on March 26 against Houston Dynamo 2. He served as team captain during his time with WFC2.

In August 2022, Campagna signed a contract through the 2023 season, with an option for 2024, with Canadian Premier League club HFX wanderers. He made his debut on August 28 against FC Edmonton. In November 2022, Campagna joined 2. Bundesliga side 1. FC Nürnberg on an off-season training stint. In December 2022, he went on trial with German 3. Liga club FSV Zwickau. In December 2023, the Wanderers declined his option for 2024.

In March 2024, he signed with FC Jazz in the Finnish third tier Ykkönen.

In January 2025, he signed with Estonian Meistriliiga club Narva Trans.

== International career ==
He played for Western Canada at the Danone Nations Cup national final in 2013. In February 2016, he was called up to a national youth team camp for the first time with the Canada U15.

In 2021 and 2022, he was a regular training squad member (despite not being an official call-up) with the Canada national team during their 2022 FIFA World Cup qualification schedule.

== Personal ==
He is the older brother of fellow professional soccer player Matteo Campagna.

== Career statistics ==
As of November 13, 2026

Appearances and goals by club, season and competition
Club	Season	League			Cup (Note: Includes Canadian Championship and Suomen Cup)		Other		Total	
Club	Season	Division	Apps	Goals	Apps	Goals	Apps	Goals	Apps	Goals
Whitecaps FC 2	2022	MLS Next Pro	19	0	–		–		19	0
HFX Wanderers	2022	Canadian Premier League	7	0	0	0	–		7	0
HFX Wanderers	2023	Canadian Premier League	10	0	1	0	–		11	0
HFX Wanderers	Total		17	0	1	0	0	0	18	0
Jazz	2024	Ykkönen	17	3	2	2	–		19	5
Narva Trans	2025	Meistriliiga	30	2	1	0	–		31	2
Narva Trans	2026	Meistriliiga	34	1	3	1	–		37	2
Narva Trans	Total		64	3	4	1	0	0	68	4
Career total			117	6	7	3	0	0	124	9
