= 2026 CONCACAF Women's U-17 Qualifiers – Round One =

2026 Concacaf Women’s U-17 Qualifiers – Round One
Tournament details
- Host country: Aruba; Bermuda; Curacao; Nicaragua
- Dates: 24 January – 2 February
- Teams: 28
- Venue: 4 (in 4 host cities)

Tournament statistics
- Matches played: 52
- Goals scored: 308 (5.92 per match)

The 2026 CONCACAF Women’s U-17 Qualifiers – Round One was the qualifying phase for the Final Round that will in turn qualify teams for the 2026 FIFA U-17 Women's World Cup. Twenty-eight teams competed for eight spots, joining the four highest-seeded teams, the United States, Mexico, Canada, and Puerto Rico, in the competition's Final Round. The result of the Round One competition was that Bermuda, Costa Rica, Dominican Republic, El Salvador, Haiti, Jamaica, Nicaragua, and Panama advanced to Final Round of 2026 CONCACAF Women’s U-17 Qualifiers.

== Format ==
The top four ranked teams automatically qualified for the Final Round and teams ranked fifth and below competed in this qualification Round One. In Round One, participating teams were split into six groups. After a round-robin tournament, each group winner and the top two runners-up qualified for the final tournament later in 2026.

== Draw ==
The draw for the group stage took place on 15 October 2025 at the CONCACAF Headquarters in Miami. The teams were seeded based on the CONCACAF Women's Under-17 Ranking as of April 2025.

Pot 1	Pot 2	Pot 3	Pot 4	Pot 5
Costa Rica; El Salvador; Haiti; Panama; Honduras; Dominican Republic	Trinidad and Tobago; Nicaragua; Jamaica; Bermuda; Cuba; Guatemala	Guyana; Cayman Islands; Grenada; ~~Saint Kitts and Nevis~~ (W); Curaçao; Belize	U.S. Virgin Islands; Anguilla; Barbados; Suriname; Saint Vincent and the Grenadines; Saint Lucia	Antigua and Barbuda; Dominica; Aruba; British Virgin Islands; Bonaire; ~~Guadeloupe~~ (W)

- (W): Withdrew after draw.

== Groups ==
The winners of each group and the two highest-ranking runners-up qualified for the Final Round. All matches were played at four different locations: Groups A and E were hosted in Nicaragua, Group B was hosted in Bermuda, Groups C and F were hosted in Curaçao, and Group D was hosted in Aruba.

=== Group A ===
Pos	Team	Pld	W	D	L	GF	GA	GD	Pts	Qualification
1	Dominican Republic	4	4	0	0	25	1	+24	12	Final Round
2	Nicaragua (H)	4	3	0	1	28	2	+26	9	Final Round
3	Belize	4	1	1	2	5	13	−8	4	
4	U.S. Virgin Islands	4	1	1	2	4	25	−21	4	
5	Dominica	4	0	0	4	0	21	−21	0	

Source: CONCACAF
Rules for classification: Qualifying stage tiebreakers
(H) Hosts
24 January 2026
16:00

Dominican Republic	7–0	Dominica
Jimenez 8', 47'; Vera 21'; Duran 40', 45+1'; Ja. Martinez 79', 90'

Estadio Miguel Chocorrón Buitrago, Managua
Referee: Génesis De León (Guatemala)
24 January 2026
19:00

Nicaragua	6–0	Belize
Miranda 2', 52', 70', 90+3'; Teofilo 32'; Ruiz 60'

Estadio Miguel Chocorrón Buitrago, Managua
Referee: Micah Erskine (Guyana)

26 January 2026
16:00

U.S. Virgin Islands	0–11	Dominican Republic
		Duran 9', 18', 20', 27', 29'; J. Diaz 17'; Santana 43'; Asenjo 45'; Antonini 49'; Fernandez 69', 73'

Estadio Miguel Chocorrón Buitrago, Managua
Referee: Belkis Flores (Honduras)
26 January 2026
19:00

Dominica	0–9	Nicaragua
		Miranda 10', 23', 66'; Ruiz 12', 16'; Zavala 51', 63'; Huete 60'; Collado 90+1'

Estadio Miguel Chocorrón Buitrago, Managua
Referee: Erika González (Mexico)

28 January 2026
16:00

Dominica	0–3	Belize
		Lewis 24', 30'; Aranda 79'

Estadio Miguel Chocorrón Buitrago, Managua
Referee: Micah Erskine (Guyana)
28 January 2026
19:00

Nicaragua	12–0	U.S. Virgin Islands
Miranda 5', 30', 39', 52', 76'; Lau 26'; Teofilo 28', 40'; Zavala 32'; Huete 45+2'; Vivas 69'; Canales 77'

Estadio Miguel Chocorrón Buitrago, Managua
Referee: Génesis De León (Guatemala)

30 January 2026
16:00

U.S. Virgin Islands	2–0	Dominica
Del Rosario-Kalpee 4'; Marshall 7'

Estadio Miguel Chocorrón Buitrago, Managua
Referee: Belkis Flores (Honduras)
30 January 2026
19:00

Belize	0–5	Dominican Republic
		Asenjo 2', 64'; Fernandez 5'; J. Diaz 54'; Schwartz 72'

Estadio Miguel Chocorrón Buitrago, Managua
Referee: Erika González (Mexico)

1 February 2026
16:00

Belize	2–2	U.S. Virgin Islands
Ellis 57', 77'		Marshall 73'; Groetzinger 81'

Estadio Miguel Chocorrón Buitrago, Managua
Referee: Génesis De León (Guatemala)
1 February 2026
19:00

Dominican Republic	2–1	Nicaragua
Duran 37'; Jimenez 74'		Agramonte 1' (o.g.)

Estadio Miguel Chocorrón Buitrago, Managua
Referee: Belkis Flores (Honduras)

=== Group B ===
Pos	Team	Pld	W	D	L	GF	GA	GD	Pts	Qualification
1	Panama	3	2	1	0	18	2	+16	7	Final Round
2	Bermuda (H)	3	2	1	0	16	3	+13	7	Final Round
3	Suriname	3	1	0	2	3	15	−12	3	
4	Bonaire	3	0	0	3	1	18	−17	0	
5	Saint Kitts and Nevis	0	0	0	0	0	0	0	0	Withdrew

Source: CONCACAF
Rules for classification: Qualifying stage tiebreakers
(H) Hosts
24 January 2026
14:00

Panama	8–0	Bonaire
Rodriguez 25'; Rios 29', 34'; Samudio 35'; Mow 60' (pen.), 67'; Ortega 79' (pen.); V. Batista 85'

Bermuda National Stadium, Devonshire
Referee: Saphire Stockman (Costa Rica)
24 January 2026
19:00

Bermuda	7–0	Suriname
Welch 4', 32'; Gibbons-Thomas 16', 28', 63', 75'; Medeiros 68'

Bermuda National Stadium, Devonshire
Referee: Kadeen Foster (Cayman Islands)

26 January 2026
14:00

Suriname	0–8	Panama
		Rodriguez 3', 25'; Magallon 8'; Mow 26'; Rendino 40', 88'; Distancia 48'; Zafrani 83'

Bermuda National Stadium, Devonshire
Referee: Danielle Chesky (United States)
26 January 2026
19:00

Bonaire	1–7	Bermuda
Mercera 75'		Outerbridge 7', 29', 41'; Gibbons-Thomas 18', 59'; Samuels 31'; Welch 37'

Bermuda National Stadium, Devonshire
Referee: Portia Davis (Antigua and Barbuda)

28 January 2026
14:00

Suriname	3–0	Bonaire
Sajat 14', 83'; Lamafoe 69'

Bermuda National Stadium, Devonshire
Referee: Kadeen Foster (Cayman Islands)
28 January 2026
19:00

Panama	2–2	Bermuda
Mow 8'; Rios 83'		Outerbridge 17'; Dill 47'

Bermuda National Stadium, Devonshire
Referee: Saphire Stockman (Costa Rica)

=== Group C ===
Pos	Team	Pld	W	D	L	GF	GA	GD	Pts	Qualification
1	Haiti	4	4	0	0	17	1	+16	12	Final Round
2	Guatemala	4	2	1	1	6	3	+3	7	
3	Cayman Islands	4	2	0	2	7	7	0	6	
4	Antigua and Barbuda	4	1	0	3	9	18	−9	3	
5	Saint Lucia	4	0	1	3	3	13	−10	1	

Source: CONCACAF
Rules for classification: Qualifying stage tiebreakers
25 January 2026
16:00

Guatemala	1–0	Cayman Islands
Aguilar 85'

Stadion Rignaal 'Jean' Francisca, Willemstad
Referee: Neressa Goldson (Jamaica)
25 January 2026
19:00

Haiti	6–1	Antigua and Barbuda
Gue 19', 30'; Lamour 21', 86'; Lormil 53'; Kamanzi-Mondestin 65'		Skepple 79'

Stadion Rignaal 'Jean' Francisca, Willemstad
Referee: Damien Rosa (Martinique)

27 January 2026
16:00

Antigua and Barbuda	0–5	Guatemala
		Luna 27', 58'; Escobar 37'; Martinez 56'; Avendaño 90+2'

Stadion Rignaal 'Jean' Francisca, Willemstad
Referee: Neressa Goldson (Jamaica)
27 January 2026
19:00

Saint Lucia	0–5	Haiti
		Lormil 4', 17'; Châtelain 61'; Gue 73'; St. Louis 86'

Stadion Rignaal 'Jean' Francisca, Willemstad
Referee: Dannia Sevilla (Costa Rica)

29 January 2026
16:00

Guatemala	0–0	Saint Lucia

Stadion Rignaal 'Jean' Francisca, Willemstad
Referee: Shandor Wilkinson (St. Kitts and Nevis)
29 January 2026
19:00

Antigua and Barbuda	3–4	Cayman Islands
Skepple 38', 42'; Quashie 61'		Windsor 9'; Bateson 22', 40'; Ridley 33'

Stadion Rignaal 'Jean' Francisca, Willemstad
Referee: Marjorie Ponce (Nicaragua)

31 January 2026
16:00

Saint Lucia	3–5	Antigua and Barbuda
Quashie 30' (o.g.); Polius 54'; Lionel 90+4'		Skepple 35', 78', 90+3'; Quashie 42', 73'

Stadion Rignaal 'Jean' Francisca, Willemstad
Referee: Dannia Sevilla (Costa Rica)
31 January 2026
19:00

Cayman Islands	0–3	Haiti
		Gue 7'; Jacques 31'; Louis 90+1'

Stadion Rignaal 'Jean' Francisca, Willemstad
Referee: Damien Rosa (Martinique)

2 February 2026
16:00

Cayman Islands	3–0	Saint Lucia
Bateson 15'; De Quintal 38'; Parchmont 84'

Stadion Rignaal 'Jean' Francisca, Willemstad
Referee: Shandor Wilkinson (St. Kitts and Nevis)
2 February 2026
19:00

Haiti	3–0	Guatemala
Châtelain 4'; Gue 5'; Lamour 45+1' (pen.)

Stadion Rignaal 'Jean' Francisca, Willemstad
Referee: Anya Voigt (United States)

=== Group D ===
Pos	Team	Pld	W	D	L	GF	GA	GD	Pts	Qualification
1	Jamaica	4	3	1	0	9	1	+8	10	Final Round
2	Honduras	4	3	0	1	21	3	+18	9	
3	Guyana	4	2	1	1	18	4	+14	7	
4	Aruba (H)	4	1	0	3	6	8	−2	3	
5	Saint Vincent and the Grenadines	4	0	0	4	1	39	−38	0	

Source: CONCACAF
Rules for classification: Qualifying stage tiebreakers
(H) Hosts
25 January 2026
15:00

Jamaica	1–1	Guyana
Prendegas 85'		Chasles 74'

Compleho Deportivo Guillermo Trinidad, Oranjestad
Referee: Cecile Hinds (Trinidad and Tobago)
25 January 2026
20:00

Honduras	3–1	Aruba
Merriam 71', 87'; Suazo 79'		Breinburg 90+2'

Compleho Deportivo Guillermo Trinidad, Oranjestad
Referee: Sandra Benítez (El Salvador)

27 January 2026
15:00

Saint Vincent and the Grenadines	0–15	Honduras
		Merriam 2' (pen.), 26' (pen.), 54', 63', 81'; Meza 3', 6', 17', 45+4', 66', 67'; Chirinos 13'; Suazo 48', 50'; Chavarria 80'

Compleho Deportivo Guillermo Trinidad, Oranjestad
Referee: Priscila Pérez (Mexico)
27 January 2026
20:00

Aruba	0–2	Jamaica
		Richards 46'; Miller 62'

Compleho Deportivo Guillermo Trinidad, Oranjestad
Referee: Moïka Calme (Guadeloupe)

29 January 2026
15:00

Jamaica	5–0	Saint Vincent and the Grenadines
Kydd 38' (o.g.); Lecky 43' (pen.); Johnson-Mighty 54'; Daley 68'; Walters 69'

Compleho Deportivo Guillermo Trinidad, Oranjestad
Referee: Sandra Benítez (El Salvador)
29 January 2026
20:00

Aruba	0–2	Guyana
		Joseph 26'; Chin 88'

Compleho Deportivo Guillermo Trinidad, Oranjestad
Referee: Cecile Hinds (Trinidad and Tobago)

31 January 2026
15:00

Guyana	1–3	Honduras
Joseph 87'		Sevilla 7'; Sanchez 45+3'; Chavarria 47'

Compleho Deportivo Guillermo Trinidad, Oranjestad
Referee: Moïka Calme (Guadeloupe)
31 January 2026
20:00

Saint Vincent and the Grenadines	1–5	Aruba
Edwards 56'		Rogers 1', 82'; Breinburg 11'; Vlijt 22'; Angela 68'

Compleho Deportivo Guillermo Trinidad, Oranjestad
Referee: Priscila Pérez (Mexico)

2 February 2026
15:00

Guyana	14–0	Saint Vincent and the Grenadines
Joseph 2'; Chasles 7', 33', 35', 45+3', 51', 60'; Chin 11'; John 22'; Biffin 28', 43'; Lombardi 53'; Pasvolsky 65'; De Vair 67'

Compleho Deportivo Guillermo Trinidad, Oranjestad
Referee: Cecile Hinds (Trinidad and Tobago)
2 February 2026
20:00

Honduras	0–1	Jamaica
		Miller 44'

Compleho Deportivo Guillermo Trinidad, Oranjestad
Referee: Sandra Benítez (El Salvador)

=== Group E ===
Pos	Team	Pld	W	D	L	GF	GA	GD	Pts	Qualification
1	Costa Rica	4	4	0	0	40	2	+38	12	Final Round
2	Cuba	4	3	0	1	16	7	+9	9	
3	Grenada	4	2	0	2	13	14	−1	6	
4	Anguilla	4	1	0	3	6	20	−14	3	
5	British Virgin Islands	4	0	0	4	1	33	−32	0	

Source: CONCACAF
Rules for classification: Qualifying stage tiebreakers
25 January 2026
16:00

Cuba	4–3	Grenada
López 29', 38', 41', 61'		Hypolite 3'; Grant 45+3'; Lewis 90+2'

Estadio Miguel Chocorrón Buitrago, Managua
Referee: Julio Güity (Honduras)
25 January 2026
19:00

Costa Rica	16–0	British Virgin Islands
Mora 5'; A. Perez 26'; Medina 30', 34', 47', 79', 82'; Paniagua 33', 36' (pen.), 37', 49'; Lopez 43'; Azofeifa 64', 69'; Chaverri 65'; Hernandez 68'

Estadio Miguel Chocorrón Buitrago, Managua
Referee: Yari Aguilar (Guatemala)

27 January 2026
16:00

British Virgin Islands	0–8	Cuba
		Sheila 2'; Diaz 29'; Ayala 50'; López 59', 80', 84'; Isaac 89', 90+1'

Estadio Miguel Chocorrón Buitrago, Managua
Referee: Mirian Leon (El Salvador)
27 January 2026
19:00

Anguilla	0–13	Costa Rica
		Hernandez 5'; Paniagua 14', 27', 47' (pen.); Medina 29', 36', 43', 45', 50'; Mora 45+1'; Azofeifa 59'; Gonzalez 83'; Venegas 90+2'

Estadio Miguel Chocorrón Buitrago, Managua
Referee: Charlize Hood (Trinidad and Tobago)

29 January 2026
16:00

Cuba	3–1	Anguilla
Isaac 46', 68'; López 56'		Henry 13'

Estadio Miguel Chocorrón Buitrago, Managua
Referee: Julio Güity (Honduras)
29 January 2026
19:00

British Virgin Islands	0–6	Grenada
		Hypolite 1', 68'; Bisasor 17'; Mathlin 23'; McNeilly 37'; Grant 77'

Estadio Miguel Chocorrón Buitrago, Managua
Referee: Yari Aguilar (Guatemala)

31 January 2026
16:00

Anguilla	3–1	British Virgin Islands
Romney 17'; Niles 31'; Henry 78'		T'N. Richardson 52'

Estadio Miguel Chocorrón Buitrago, Managua
Referee: Charlize Hood (Trinidad and Tobago)
31 January 2026
19:00

Grenada	1–8	Costa Rica
Hypolite 18'		Paniagua 4', 45+1', 85'; Mora 8'; Marin 42'; Medina 63', 70'; Hernandez 81'

Estadio Miguel Chocorrón Buitrago, Managua
Referee: Mirian Leon (El Salvador)

2 February 2026
16:00

Grenada	3–2	Anguilla
Bisasor 10'; Hypolite 48', 57'		Durand 2'; Gaskin 86'

Estadio Miguel Chocorrón Buitrago, Managua
Referee: Charlize Hood (Trinidad and Tobago)
2 February 2026
19:00

Costa Rica	3–1	Cuba
Vargas 46'; Paniagua 54', 58' (pen.)		López 89'

Estadio Miguel Chocorrón Buitrago, Managua
Referee: Erika González (Mexico)

=== Group F ===
Pos	Team	Pld	W	D	L	GF	GA	GD	Pts	Qualification
1	El Salvador	3	3	0	0	15	0	+15	9	Final Round
2	Curaçao (H)	3	1	1	1	6	6	0	4	
3	Trinidad and Tobago	3	1	1	1	10	11	−1	4	
4	Barbados	3	0	0	3	4	18	−14	0	
5	Guadeloupe	0	0	0	0	0	0	0	0	Withdrew

Source: CONCACAF
Rules for classification: Qualifying stage tiebreakers
(H) Hosts
24 January 2026
19:00

Trinidad and Tobago	2–2	Curaçao
Jones 58'; Wilson 80'		Jubitha 52'; Martis Nocento 83'

Stadion Rignaal 'Jean' Francisca, Willemstad
Referee: Kareem Benjamin (St. Kitts and Nevis)
26 January 2026
19:00

Barbados	0–6	El Salvador
		Guardado 1', 71'; Rivera 13'; Alvarez 41'; Menjivar 56'; Jones 70'

Stadion Rignaal 'Jean' Francisca, Willemstad
Referee: Smeedly Saint-Jean (Haiti)

28 January 2026
19:00

Trinidad and Tobago	8–2	Barbados
Wilson 10', 17'; Matthews 34'; Gittens 40'; Jean-Jacques 45+2', 56'; John 51'; Jones 72'		Birmingham 12', 63'

Stadion Rignaal 'Jean' Francisca, Willemstad
Referee: Kareem Benjamin (St. Kitts and Nevis)
30 January 2026
19:00

Curaçao	0–2	El Salvador
		Guardado 14'; Alvarez 85'

Stadion Rignaal 'Jean' Francisca, Willemstad
Referee: Neressa Goldson (Jamaica)

1 February 2026
16:00

El Salvador	7–0	Trinidad and Tobago
Alvarenga 28', 45+4'; Torres 45+1', 61'; Alvarez 51'; Guardado 58', 71'

Stadion Rignaal 'Jean' Francisca, Willemstad
Referee: Smeedly Saint-Jean (Haiti)
1 February 2026
19:00

Curaçao	4–2	Barbados
Huizing 11'; Martina 80'; Koko 89', 90+4' (pen.)		Birmingham 14', 45+3' (pen.)

Stadion Rignaal 'Jean' Francisca, Willemstad
Referee: Marjorie Ponce (Nicaragua)

=== Ranking of second-placed teams ===
The ranking of the best second-place teams was determined using a weighted points system, prioritizing total number of points won and divided by the number of matches played.

Pos	Grp	Team	Pld	W	D	L	GF	GA	GD	Pts	PPG	Qualification
1	B	Bermuda	3	2	1	0	16	3	+13	7	2.33	Final Round
2	A	Nicaragua	4	3	0	1	28	2	+26	9	2.25	Final Round
3	D	Honduras	4	3	0	1	21	3	+18	9	2.25	
4	E	Cuba	4	3	0	1	16	7	+9	9	2.25	
5	C	Guatemala	4	2	1	1	6	3	+3	7	1.75	
6	F	Curaçao	3	1	1	1	6	6	0	4	1.33	

Source: CONCACAF
Rules for classification: 1. Points per game; 2. Goal difference; 3. Goals scored; 4. Fair play points; 5. Drawing of lots.

== Goalscorers ==
There were 308 goals scored in 52 matches, for an average of 5.92 goals per match.

12 goals

- (Costa Rica) Nubia Medina
- (Costa Rica) Lucia Paniagua
- (Nicaragua) Stefany Miranda

9 goals

- (Nicaragua) Yaiselis López

8 goals

- (Dominican Republic) Giocarla Duran

7 goals

- (Guyana) Alexaudria Chasles
- (Honduras) Alexandra Merriam

6 goals

- (Antigua and Barbuda) Keitonya Skepple
- (Bermuda) Milan Gibbons-Thomas
- (Grenada) Alexis Hypolite
- (Honduras) Nohemy Meza

5 goals

- (El Salvador) Kylie Guardado
- (Haiti) Keisha Gue

4 goals

- (Barbados) Gabrielle Birmingham
- (Bermuda) Daley Outerbridge
- (Cuba) Yoesmayda Isaac
- (Panama) Shaday Mow

3 goals

- (Antigua and Barbuda) Nafisa Quashie
- (Bermuda) Evans Welch
- (Cayman Islands) Reese Bateson
- (Costa Rica) Emma Azofeifa
- (Costa Rica) Nicole Hernandez
- (Costa Rica) Cameron Mora
- (Dominican Republic) Emelie Asenjo
- (Dominican Republic) Gia Fernandez
- (Dominican Republic) Caelyn Jimenez
- (El Salvador) Kaylen Alvarez
- (Guyana) Anaya Joseph
- (Haiti) Kerdina Lamour
- (Haiti) Kyrah Lormil
- (Honduras) Allisson Suazo
- (Nicaragua) Marian Ruiz
- (Nicaragua) Maxie Teofilo
- (Nicaragua) Mariela Zavala
- (Panama) Cristabella Rios
- (Panama) Gabriela Rodriguez
- (Trinidad and Tobago) Sanni Wilson

2 goals

- (Anguilla) Joden Henry
- (Aruba) Adannayah Breinburg
- (Aruba) Zyana Rogers
- (Belize) Sophia Ellis
- (Belize) Kiana Lewis
- (Curaçao) Destiny Koko
- (Dominican Republic) Jazmyn Diaz
- (Dominican Republic) Jabes Martinez
- (El Salvador) Angie Alvarenga
- (El Salvador) Emma Torres
- (Grenada) Cara Bisasor
- (Grenada) Arielle Grant
- (Guatemala) Kaylee Luna
- (Guyana) Lily Biffin
- (Guyana) Arianna Chin
- (Haiti) Krystel Châtelain
- (Honduras) Valentina Chavarria
- (Jamaica) Elizabeth Miller
- (Nicaragua) Kaylin Huete
- (Panama) Isabella Rendino
- (Suriname) Renessa Sajat
- (Trinidad and Tobago) Torie Jean-Jacques
- (Trinidad and Tobago) Jade Jones
- (United States Virgin Islands) Reagan Marshall

1 goal

- (Anguilla) Kaylee Durand
- (Anguilla) Safiyah Gaskin
- (Anguilla) McKenzie Niles
- (Anguilla) Phaedra Romney
- (Aruba) Liandra Angela
- (Aruba) Kaylee Vlijt
- (Belize) Jolene Aranda
- (Bermuda) Priya Dill
- (Bermuda) Nadia Medeiros
- (Bermuda) Nila Samuels
- (Bonaire) Shaimaris Mercera
- (British Virgin Islands) T'Nyah Richardson
- (Cayman Islands) Clara De Quintal
- (Cayman Islands) Kezia Parchmont
- (Cayman Islands) Olivia Ridley
- (Cayman Islands) Cosabella Windsor
- (Costa Rica) Isska Chaverri
- (Costa Rica) María Gonzalez
- (Costa Rica) Gilliam Lopez
- (Costa Rica) Isabella Marin
- (Costa Rica) Avril Perez
- (Costa Rica) Valentina Vargas
- (Costa Rica) Stacy Venegas
- (Cuba) Dayana Ayala
- (Cuba) Emely Diaz
- (Cuba) Dedina Sheila
- (Curaçao) Elisa Huizing
- (Curaçao) Jacelynn Jubitha
- (Curaçao) Jairvienis Martina
- (Curaçao) Xiarleahmay Martis Nocento
- (Dominican Republic) Delilah Antonini
- (Dominican Republic) Samantha Santana
- (Dominican Republic) Jessalyn Schwartz
- (Dominican Republic) Blair Vera
- (El Salvador) Ariana Jones
- (El Salvador) Melanie Menjivar
- (El Salvador) Shirley Rivera
- (Grenada) Jazmine Lewis
- (Grenada) Arian Mathlin
- (Grenada) Adonia McNeilly
- (Guatemala) Emery Aguilar
- (Guatemala) Mayra Avendaño
- (Guatemala) Dulce Escobar
- (Guatemala) Monica Martinez
- (Guyana) Tanya De Vair
- (Guyana) Aliya John
- (Guyana) Carissa Lombardi
- (Guyana) Avril Pasvolsky
- (Haiti) Lea Jacques
- (Haiti) Daphney Louis
- (Haiti) Adjani Mondestin
- (Haiti) Rosalie St. Louis
- (Honduras) Zadie Chirinos
- (Honduras) Jazlyn Sanchez
- (Honduras) Ilsy Sevilla
- (Jamaica) Kalila Daley
- (Jamaica) Malayna Johnson-Mighty
- (Jamaica) Jaya Lecky
- (Jamaica) Nycolette Prendegas
- (Jamaica) Ricquanna Richards
- (Jamaica) Shennel Walters
- (Nicaragua) Mitzy Canales
- (Nicaragua) Margarita Collado
- (Nicaragua) Helena Lau
- (Nicaragua) Anahi Vivas
- (Panama) Vera Batista
- (Panama) Guillehely Distancia
- (Panama) Yasselis Magallon
- (Panama) Alexa Ortega
- (Panama) Alisson Samudio
- (Panama) Naomi Zafrani
- (Saint Lucia) Kyla Lionel
- (Saint Lucia) Kayla Polius
- (Saint Vincent and the Grenadines) Amunique Edwards
- (Suriname) ANamiesha Lamafoe
- (Trinidad and Tobago) Rori Gittens
- (Trinidad and Tobago) Chelsea John
- (Trinidad and Tobago) Shiyah Matthews
- (United States Virgin Islands) Kyla Groetzinger
- (United States Virgin Islands) Celine Kalpee

1 own goal

- (Antigua and Barbuda) Nafisa Quashie (against Saint Lucia)
- (Dominican Republic) Ashly Agramonte (against Nicaragua)
- (Saint Vincent and the Grenadines) Nailah Kydd (against Jamaica)
