= 2020 CONCACAF Women's U-17 Championship =

Tournament details
- Host country: Mexico
- Dates: Cancelled (originally 18 April – 3 May 2020)
- Teams: 20 (from 1 confederation)
- Venue: TBC (in 1 host city)

The 2020 CONCACAF Women's U-17 Championship was originally to be the 7th edition of the CONCACAF Women's U-17 Championship, the biennial international youth football championship organised by CONCACAF for the women's under-17 national teams of the North, Central American and Caribbean region. The tournament was originally scheduled to be held in Mexico between 18 April and 3 May 2020. However, on 19 March 2020, CONCACAF announced the decision to postpone the tournament due to the COVID-19 pandemic, with the new dates of the tournament to be confirmed later.

The final tournament was expanded from eight to 20 teams, using the same format as the 2019 CONCACAF U-17 Championship. The top three teams of the tournament would have qualified for the 2021 FIFA U-17 Women's World Cup (originally 2020 but postponed due to COVID-19 pandemic) in India as the CONCACAF representatives. However, FIFA announced on 17 November 2020 that this edition of the World Cup would be cancelled. Following this announcement, CONCACAF decided on the same day that the 2020 CONCACAF Women's U-17 Championship, which served as the regional qualifiers, would be cancelled.

United States were the defending champions.

== Qualified teams ==
The qualifying format has changed since the 2018 edition, and the teams are no longer divided into regional zones.

The 41 CONCACAF teams were ranked based on the CONCACAF Women's Under-17 Ranking as of 2018. A total of 32 teams entered the tournament. The highest-ranked 16 entrants were exempt from qualifying and advanced directly to the group stage of the final tournament, while the lowest-ranked 16 entrants had to participate in the qualifying stage, where the four group winners advanced to the round of 16 of the knockout stage of the final tournament.

Round	Team	Qualification	Appearance (planned)	Previous best performance	Previous FIFA U-17 Women's World Cup appearances
Group stage	Mexico (hosts)	1st ranked entrant	7th	Champions (2013)	5
Group stage	Canada	2nd ranked entrant	7th	Champions (2010)	6
Group stage	United States (title holders)	3rd ranked entrant	7th	Champions (2008, 2012, 2016, 2018)	4
Group stage	Haiti	4th ranked entrant	5th	Fourth place (2016, 2018)	0
Group stage	Costa Rica	5th ranked entrant	5th	Runners-up (2008)	2
Group stage	Jamaica	6th ranked entrant	6th	Fourth place (2013)	0
Group stage	Trinidad and Tobago	7th ranked entrant	4th	Group stage (2008, 2012, 2013)	1
Group stage	Guatemala	8th ranked entrant	4th	Group stage (2012, 2013, 2016)	0
Group stage	Puerto Rico	9th ranked entrant	3rd	Group stage (2008, 2018)	0
Group stage	Bermuda	10th ranked entrant	2nd	Group stage (2018)	0
Group stage	El Salvador	11th ranked entrant	3rd	Group stage (2008, 2013)	0
Group stage	Panama	12th ranked entrant	3rd	Group stage (2010, 2012)	0
Group stage	Dominican Republic	13th ranked entrant	1st	Debut	0
Group stage	Cuba	14th ranked entrant	1st	Debut	0
Group stage	Grenada	15th ranked entrant	2nd	Group stage (2016)	0
Group stage	Nicaragua	16th ranked entrant	2nd	Group stage (2018)	0
Knockout stage	Honduras	Qualifying Group A winner	1st	Debut	0
Knockout stage	Cayman Islands	Qualifying Group B winner	2nd	Group stage (2010)	0
Knockout stage	Belize	Qualifying Group C winner	1st	Debut	0
Knockout stage	Guyana	Qualifying Group D winner	1st	Debut	0

== Venues ==
- Mexican Football Federation Headquarters, Toluca

== Draw ==
The draw for the group stage took place on 9 May 2019, 11:00 EDT (UTC−4), at the CONCACAF Headquarters in Miami. The 16 teams which entered the group stage were drawn into four groups of four teams. Based on the CONCACAF Women's Under-17 Ranking, the 16 teams were distributed into four pots, with teams in Pot 1 assigned to each group prior to the draw, as follows:

Pot 1	Pot 2	Pot 3	Pot 4
Mexico (E1); Canada (F1); United States (G1); Haiti (H1)	Costa Rica; Jamaica; Trinidad and Tobago; Guatemala	Puerto Rico; Bermuda; El Salvador; Panama	Dominican Republic; Cuba; Grenada; Nicaragua

== Squads ==
Players born on or after 1 January 2003 are eligible to compete. Each team must register a squad of 20 players, two of whom must be goalkeepers.

== Group stage ==
The top three teams in each group advance to the round of 16, where they are joined by the four teams advancing from the qualifying stage.

Tiebreakers

The ranking of teams in each group is determined as follows (Regulations Article 12.8):

1. Points obtained in all group matches (three points for a win, one for a draw, zero for a loss);
2. Goal difference in all group matches;
3. Number of goals scored in all group matches;
4. Points obtained in the matches played between the teams in question;
5. Goal difference in the matches played between the teams in question;
6. Number of goals scored in the matches played between the teams in question;
7. Fair play points in all group matches (only one deduction could be applied to a player in a single match):
  - Yellow card: −1 points;
  - Indirect red card (second yellow card): −3 points;
  - Direct red card: −4 points;
  - Yellow card and direct red card: −5 points;
8. Drawing of lots.

All times are local, CDT (UTC−5).

=== Group E ===
Pos	Team	Pld	W	D	L	GF	GA	GD	Pts	Qualification
1	Mexico (H)	0	0	0	0	0	0	0	0	Knockout stage
2	Trinidad and Tobago	0	0	0	0	0	0	0	0	Knockout stage
3	Bermuda	0	0	0	0	0	0	0	0	Knockout stage
4	Nicaragua	0	0	0	0	0	0	0	0	

Source: CONCACAF
Rules for classification: Group stage tiebreakers
(H) Hosts
18 April 2020

Trinidad and Tobago	Cancelled	Bermuda
	Report

18 April 2020

Mexico	Cancelled	Nicaragua
	Report

20 April 2020

Nicaragua	Cancelled	Trinidad and Tobago
	Report

20 April 2020

Bermuda	Cancelled	Mexico
	Report

22 April 2020

Bermuda	Cancelled	Nicaragua
	Report

22 April 2020

Mexico	Cancelled	Trinidad and Tobago
	Report

=== Group F ===
Pos	Team	Pld	W	D	L	GF	GA	GD	Pts	Qualification
1	Canada	0	0	0	0	0	0	0	0	Knockout stage
2	Jamaica	0	0	0	0	0	0	0	0	Knockout stage
3	Panama	0	0	0	0	0	0	0	0	Knockout stage
4	Dominican Republic	0	0	0	0	0	0	0	0	

Source: CONCACAF
Rules for classification: Group stage tiebreakers
19 April 2020

Jamaica	Cancelled	Panama
	Report

19 April 2020

Canada	Cancelled	Dominican Republic
	Report

21 April 2020

Dominican Republic	Cancelled	Jamaica
	Report

21 April 2020

Panama	Cancelled	Canada
	Report

23 April 2020

Panama	Cancelled	Dominican Republic
	Report

23 April 2020

Canada	Cancelled	Jamaica
	Report

=== Group G ===
Pos	Team	Pld	W	D	L	GF	GA	GD	Pts	Qualification
1	United States	0	0	0	0	0	0	0	0	Knockout stage
2	Guatemala	0	0	0	0	0	0	0	0	Knockout stage
3	El Salvador	0	0	0	0	0	0	0	0	Knockout stage
4	Cuba	0	0	0	0	0	0	0	0	

Source: CONCACAF
Rules for classification: Group stage tiebreakers
18 April 2020

Guatemala	Cancelled	El Salvador
	Report

18 April 2020

United States	Cancelled	Cuba
	Report

20 April 2020

Cuba	Cancelled	Guatemala
	Report

20 April 2020

El Salvador	Cancelled	United States
	Report

22 April 2020

El Salvador	Cancelled	Cuba
	Report

22 April 2020

United States	Cancelled	Guatemala
	Report

=== Group H ===
Pos	Team	Pld	W	D	L	GF	GA	GD	Pts	Qualification
1	Haiti	0	0	0	0	0	0	0	0	Knockout stage
2	Costa Rica	0	0	0	0	0	0	0	0	Knockout stage
3	Puerto Rico	0	0	0	0	0	0	0	0	Knockout stage
4	Grenada	0	0	0	0	0	0	0	0	

Source: CONCACAF
Rules for classification: Group stage tiebreakers
19 April 2020

Costa Rica	Cancelled	Puerto Rico
	Report

19 April 2020

Haiti	Cancelled	Grenada
	Report

21 April 2020

Grenada	Cancelled	Costa Rica
	Report

21 April 2020

Puerto Rico	Cancelled	Haiti
	Report

23 April 2020

Puerto Rico	Cancelled	Grenada
	Report

23 April 2020

Haiti	Cancelled	Costa Rica
	Report

== Knockout stage ==
In the knockout stage, if a match is level at the end of 90 minutes, extra time is played, and if still tied after extra time, the match is decided by a penalty shoot-out (Regulations Article 12.13).

=== Bracket ===
Round of 16
25 April –
1E
Guyana
25 April –
2G
3E
25 April –
1G
Cayman Islands
25 April –
2E
3G
26 April –
1F
Belize
26 April –
2H
3F
26 April –
1H
Honduras
26 April –
2F
3H

Quarter-finals
29 April –
W25
W28
29 April –
W26
W27
29 April –
W29
W32
29 April –
W30
W31

Semi-finals
1 May –
W33
W34
1 May –
W35
W36

Final
3 May –
W37
W38
Third place match
3 May –
L37
L38

=== Round of 16 ===
25 April 2020

1E	Cancelled	Guyana
	Report

25 April 2020

1G	Cancelled	Cayman Islands
	Report

25 April 2020

2E	Cancelled	3G
	Report

25 April 2020

2G	Cancelled	3E
	Report

26 April 2020

1F	Cancelled	Belize
	Report

26 April 2020

1H	Cancelled	Honduras
	Report

26 April 2020

2F	Cancelled	3H
	Report

26 April 2020

2H	Cancelled	3F
	Report

=== Quarter-finals ===
29 April 2020
13:30

W25	Cancelled	W28
	Report

29 April 2020
13:30

W26	Cancelled	W27
	Report

29 April 2020
16:00

W29	Cancelled	W32
	Report

29 April 2020
16:00

W30	Cancelled	W31
	Report

=== Semi-finals ===
Winners would have qualified for 2021 FIFA U-17 Women's World Cup.

1 May 2020

W33	Cancelled	W34
	Report

1 May 2020

W35	Cancelled	W36
	Report

=== Third place match ===
Winner would have qualified for 2021 FIFA U-17 Women's World Cup.

3 May 2020

L37	Cancelled	L38
	Report

=== Final ===
3 May 2020

W37	Cancelled	W38
	Report
