= 2025 CONCACAF U-17 Women's World Cup qualification – Final round =

2025 Concacaf Women’s U-17 Qualifiers
Tournament details
- Host countries: Mexico; Nicaragua; Trinidad and Tobago
- Dates: 31 March – 6 April 2025
- Teams: 12 (from 1 confederation)
- Venue: 3 (in 3 host cities)

Tournament statistics
- Matches played: 18
- Goals scored: 95 (5.28 per match)
- Top scorer(s): (Mexico) Citlalli Reyes (5 goals)

The 2025 CONCACAF U-17 Women's World Cup qualification, officially called 2025 CONCACAF Women’s U-17 Qualifiers Final Round, was the tournament to decide which teams qualify for the 2025 FIFA U-17 Women's World Cup in Morocco. Four qualifying slots were allocated to CONCACAF.

Unlike past editions, the 2025 qualification process did not culminate in the determination of a champion, as was the case under the CONCACAF Women's U-17 Championship. Instead, three groups of round-robin competitions resulted in three group winners and one best-ranked runner-up qualifying for the FIFA U-17 Women's World Cup Morocco 2025 as CONCACAF's representatives.

== Qualification ==
Twenty-two teams competed for eight spots in the tournament, where they joined the four highest-seeded teams on the CONCACAF Women's Under-17 Ranking as of 1 March 2024, the United States, Mexico, Canada, and Haiti.

Team	Method of qualification	App.	Previous best performance	Previous World Cup appearances
United States (title holders)	Four top-ranked entrants	9th	Champions (2008, 2012, 2016, 2018, 2022, 2024)	6
Mexico	Four top-ranked entrants	9th	Champions (2013)	7
Canada	Four top-ranked entrants	9th	Champions (2010)	7
Haiti	Four top-ranked entrants	7th	Fourth place (2016, 2018, 2024)	0
Puerto Rico	Qualifying Group A winners	5th	Fourth place (2022)	0
Honduras	Qualifying Group B winners	2nd	Round of 16 (2022)	0
Panama	Qualifying Group C winners	5th	Fourth place (2012)	0
El Salvador	Qualifying Group D winners	5th	Quarter-finals (2022)	0
Nicaragua	Qualifying Group E winners	3rd	Round of 16 (2022)	0
Costa Rica	Qualifying Group F winners	7th	Runners-up (2008)	2
Trinidad and Tobago	Qualifying best two runners-up	5th	Group stage (2008, 2012, 2013, 2022)	1
Bermuda	Qualifying best two runners-up	3rd	Group stage (2018, 2022)	0

== Venues ==
Managua replaced Panama City on 3 March 2025.

2025 CONCACAF U-17 Women's World Cup qualification – Final round is located in North America	(Mexico) Toluca	(Nicaragua) Managua	(Trinidad and Tobago) Couva
2025 CONCACAF U-17 Women's World Cup qualification – Final round is located in North America	Group A	Group B	Group C
2025 CONCACAF U-17 Women's World Cup qualification – Final round is located in North America	Campo 1 - Federación; Mexicana de Fútbol (FMF)	Estadio Nacional de Fútbol	Ato Boldon Stadium

== Draw ==
The draw of the tournament was held at 11:00 ET on 24 February 2025 at the CONCACAF Headquarters in Miami, Florida. The four highest-seeded teams, which qualified automatically for the tournament, took the first positions in Pot 1 and 2. The eight teams, that advanced from qualifying, were placed in pots based on the CONCACAF Women's Under-17 Ranking on 4 February 2025. Teams were drawn into three groups of four teams. Co-host teams could not be placed in the same group. After the draw, Nicaragua replaced Panama as co-host on 3 March 2025.

Pot 1	Pot 2	Pot 3	Pot 4
United States; Mexico^{CH}; Canada	Haiti; Puerto Rico; El Salvador	Costa Rica; Panama; Honduras	Nicaragua^{CH}; Trinidad and Tobago^{CH}; Bermuda

== Squads ==
On 25 March 2025, the rosters for each team were announced.

== Groups ==
All times are local.

Tiebreakers

The ranking of teams in each group was determined as follows:

1. Points obtained in all group matches;
2. Goal difference in all group matches;
3. Goals scored in all group matches;
4. Points obtained among tied teams;
5. Goal difference among tied teams;
6. Goals scored among tied teams;
7. Fair play points in all group matches;
8. Latest Concacaf Women’s Under-17 Ranking.

=== Group A ===
Pos	Team	Pld	W	D	L	GF	GA	GD	Pts	Qualification
1	Mexico (H)	3	3	0	0	21	0	+21	9	2025 FIFA U-17 Women's World Cup
2	Costa Rica	3	2	0	1	17	5	+12	6	2025 FIFA U-17 Women's World Cup
3	Haiti	3	1	0	2	4	21	−17	3	
4	Bermuda	3	0	0	3	2	18	−16	0	

Source: CONCACAF
Rules for classification: Tiebreakers
(H) Hosts
31 March 2025
12:00

Haiti	0–8	Costa Rica
	Report	Solano 19'; Paniagua 27', 39', 45+4'; Alfaro 45+2'; Recio 61'; Medina 70'; Lindo 84'

Campo 1 - FMF, Toluca
Referee: Sandra Benítez (El Salvador)
31 March 2025
15:00

Mexico	5–0	Bermuda
Reyes 15'; J. Solís 16'; Miyazato 49'; Vázquez 52'; Villalpando 90+9'	Report

Campo 1 - FMF, Toluca
Referee: Glenda López (Guatemala)

2 April 2025
12:00

Bermuda	1–4	Haiti
Samuels 90+4'	Report	Étienne 14' (pen.), 27'; Désert 17'; Piquion 82' (pen.)

Campo 1 - FMF, Toluca
Referee: Danielle Chesky (United States)
2 April 2025
15:00

Costa Rica	0–4	Mexico
	Report	Reyes 28' (pen.), 78' (pen.); J. Solís 31'; Sánchez 45+1'

Campo 1 - FMF, Toluca
Referee: Adorae Monroy (United States)

5 April 2025
12:00

Costa Rica	9–1	Bermuda
Paniagua 11' (pen.); Ocampo 20', 48'; Ruiz 28'; Medina 30', 52', 72'; Simons 45+2' (o.g.); Murillo 90+3'	Report	Sealey 4'

Campo 1 - FMF, Toluca
Referee: Adorae Monroy (United States)
5 April 2025
15:00

Mexico	12–0	Haiti
Larco 3' (o.g.); Reyes 4', 9'; Stack 4', 23'; González 25'; J. Solís 33'; M. Solís 46', 86', 90+4'; Miyazato 55'; Núñez 62'	Report

Campo 1 - FMF, Toluca
Referee: Glenda López (Guatemala)

=== Group B ===
Pos	Team	Pld	W	D	L	GF	GA	GD	Pts	Qualification
1	Canada	3	3	0	0	10	2	+8	9	2025 FIFA U-17 Women's World Cup
2	Puerto Rico	3	2	0	1	12	4	+8	6	
3	Panama	3	1	0	2	3	8	−5	3	
4	Nicaragua (H)	3	0	0	3	0	11	−11	0	

Source: CONCACAF
Rules for classification: Tiebreakers
(H) Hosts
1 April 2025
16:00

Puerto Rico	6–1	Panama
Falcón 1', 47'; Garnett 16', 20', 21'; Adame 70'	Report	Foye 26' (o.g.)

Estadio Nacional de Fútbol, Managua
Referee: Alex Billeter (United States)
1 April 2025
19:00

Canada	5–0	Nicaragua
Kindel 18'; Kekić 34'; Hunter 41'; Chisholm 49'; Donnelly 90+4'	Report

Estadio Nacional de Fútbol, Managua
Referee: Shandor Wilkinson (Saint Kitts and Nevis)

3 April 2025
16:00

Panama	0–2	Canada
	Report	Kekić 35'; Reda 60'

Estadio Nacional de Fútbol, Managua
Referee: Priscila Pérez (Mexico)
3 April 2025
19:00

Nicaragua	0–4	Puerto Rico
	Report	Walton 35'; Russell 55'; Garnett 59'; Feliciano 87'

Estadio Nacional de Fútbol, Managua
Referee: Saphire Stockman (Costa Rica)

6 April 2025
16:00

Canada	3–2	Puerto Rico
Bader 45+5'; Chisholm 71'; Hunter 74'	Report	Falcón 45', 57'

Estadio Nacional de Fútbol, Managua
Referee: Shandor Wilkinson (Saint Kitts and Nevis)
6 April 2025
19:00

Panama	2–0	Nicaragua
Onodera 3'; Mow 71'	Report

Estadio Nacional de Fútbol, Managua
Referee: Alex Billeter (United States)

=== Group C ===
Pos	Team	Pld	W	D	L	GF	GA	GD	Pts	Qualification
1	United States	3	3	0	0	17	0	+17	9	2025 FIFA U-17 Women's World Cup
2	El Salvador	3	1	1	1	5	8	−3	4	
3	Honduras	3	1	1	1	3	9	−6	4	
4	Trinidad and Tobago (H)	3	0	0	3	1	9	−8	0	

Source: CONCACAF
Rules for classification: Tiebreakers
(H) Hosts
31 March 2025
16:00

El Salvador	1–1	Honduras
Buerger 13'	Report	Sánchez 61'

Ato Boldon Stadium, Couva
Referee: Marjorie Ponce (Nicaragua)
31 March 2025
19:00

United States	3–0	Trinidad and Tobago
Anderson 63'; Johnson 78'; Sadler 90'	Report

Ato Boldon Stadium, Couva
Referee: Neressa Goldson (Jamaica)

2 April 2025
16:00

Honduras	0–7	United States
	Report	Ascanio 45'; Johnson 47'; Anderson 51', 74'; Cecil 56'; Kennedy 60'; Rodriguez 65'

Ato Boldon Stadium, Couva
Referee: Dilia Bradley (Guatemala)
2 April 2025
19:00

Trinidad and Tobago	0–4	El Salvador
	Report	Salgado 58'; Buerger 61'; Alvarenga 86', 90'

Ato Boldon Stadium, Couva
Referee: Suleimy Linares (Cuba)

5 April 2025
16:00

United States	7–0	El Salvador
Johnson 10', 55' (pen.); Antonucci 30'; Anderson 47'; Rodriguez 49'; Touray 58'; Milam 74'	Report

Ato Boldon Stadium, Couva
Referee: Marjorie Ponce (Nicaragua)
5 April 2025
19:00

Honduras	2–1	Trinidad and Tobago
Merriam 3' (pen.); Santos 90+1'	Report	Sealey 45+4'

Ato Boldon Stadium, Couva
Referee: Dilia Bradley (Guatemala)

=== Ranking of second-placed teams ===
Pos	Grp	Team	Pld	W	D	L	GF	GA	GD	Pts	Qualification
1	A	Costa Rica	3	2	0	1	17	5	+12	6	2025 FIFA U-17 Women's World Cup
2	B	Puerto Rico	3	2	0	1	12	4	+8	6	
3	C	El Salvador	3	1	1	1	5	8	−3	4	

Source: CONCACAF
Rules for classification: 1) points; 2) goal difference; 3) goals scored; 4) fair play points; 5) Latest Concacaf Women’s Under-17 Ranking.

== Goalscorers ==
There were 95 goals scored in 18 matches, for an average of 5.28 goals per match.

5 goals

- (Mexico) Citlalli Reyes

4 goals

- (Costa Rica) Nubia Medina
- (Costa Rica) Lucía Paniagua
- (Puerto Rico) Giselle Falcón
- (Puerto Rico) Gabriella Garnett
- (United States) Ashlyn Anderson
- (United States) Micayla Johnson

3 goals

- (Mexico) Joselyn Solís
- (Mexico) Miranda Solís

2 goals

- (Canada) Olivia Chisholm
- (Canada) Kaylee Hunter
- (Canada) Melisa Kekić
- (Costa Rica) Daniela Ocampo
- (El Salvador) Angie Alvarenga
- (El Salvador) Maya Buerger
- (Haiti) Ella Étienne
- (Mexico) Anaiya Miyazato
- (Mexico) Ava Stack
- (United States) Jaiden Rodriguez

1 goal

- (Bermuda) Nila Samuels
- (Bermuda) Janiya Sealey
- (Canada) Joelle Bader
- (Canada) Emma Donnelly
- (Canada) Lacey Kindel
- (Canada) Emma Reda
- (Costa Rica) Fabiana Alfaro
- (Costa Rica) Alisha Lindo
- (Costa Rica) Michelle Murillo
- (Costa Rica) Raquel Recio
- (Costa Rica) Tiara Ruiz
- (Costa Rica) Verónica Solano
- (El Salvador) Abigaíl Salgado
- (Haiti) Dominique Désert
- (Haiti) Maya Piquion
- (Honduras) Alexandra Merriam
- (Honduras) Jazlyn Sánchez
- (Honduras) Allanys Santos
- (Mexico) Adrianna González
- (Mexico) Sofía Núñez
- (Mexico) Zoé Sánchez
- (Mexico) Valeria Vázquez
- (Mexico) Mia Villalpando
- (Panama) Shaday Mow
- (Panama) Alison Onodera
- (Puerto Rico) Camila Adame
- (Puerto Rico) Journie María Feliciano
- (Puerto Rico) Jaeda Russell
- (Puerto Rico) Jayla Walton
- (Trinidad and Tobago) Diem Sealey
- (United States) Scottie Antonucci
- (United States) Kimmi Ascanio
- (United States) Pearl Cecil
- (United States) Riley Kennedy
- (United States) Gracelynn Milam
- (United States) Chloe Sadler
- (United States) Nyanya Touray

1 own goal

- (Bermuda) Ayshalay Simons (against Costa Rica)
- (Haiti) Miya Larco (against Mexico)
- (Puerto Rico) Paige Foye (against Panama)

Source: CONCACAF

== Qualified teams for FIFA U-17 Women's World Cup ==
The following four teams from CONCACAF qualified for the 2025 FIFA U-17 Women's World Cup.

Team	Qualified on	Previous appearances in FIFA U-17 Women's World Cup^{1}
Mexico	5 April 2025	7 (2010, 2012, 2014, 2016, 2018, 2022, 2024)
Canada	6 April 2025	7 (2008, 2010, 2012, 2014, 2016, 2018, 2022)
United States	5 April 2025	6 (2008, 2012, 2016, 2018, 2022, 2024)
Costa Rica	6 April 2025	2 (2008, 2014)

^{1}Italic indicates hosts for that year.

== Best XI ==
Best XI
Goalkeeper	Defenders	Midfielders	Forwards
(Canada) Olivia Busby	(Mexico) Adrianna González; (Mexico) Berenice Ibarra; (United States) Pearl Cecil	(Costa Rica) Lucía Paniagua; (El Salvador) Maya Buerger; (Mexico) Citlalli Reyes; (Puerto Rico) Giselle Falcón	(Costa Rica) Nubia Medina; (United States) Ashlyn Anderson; (United States) Micayla Johnson
