= Estadio Alejandro Morera Soto =

Football stadium

- La Catedral del Fútbol "The Cathedral of Football"
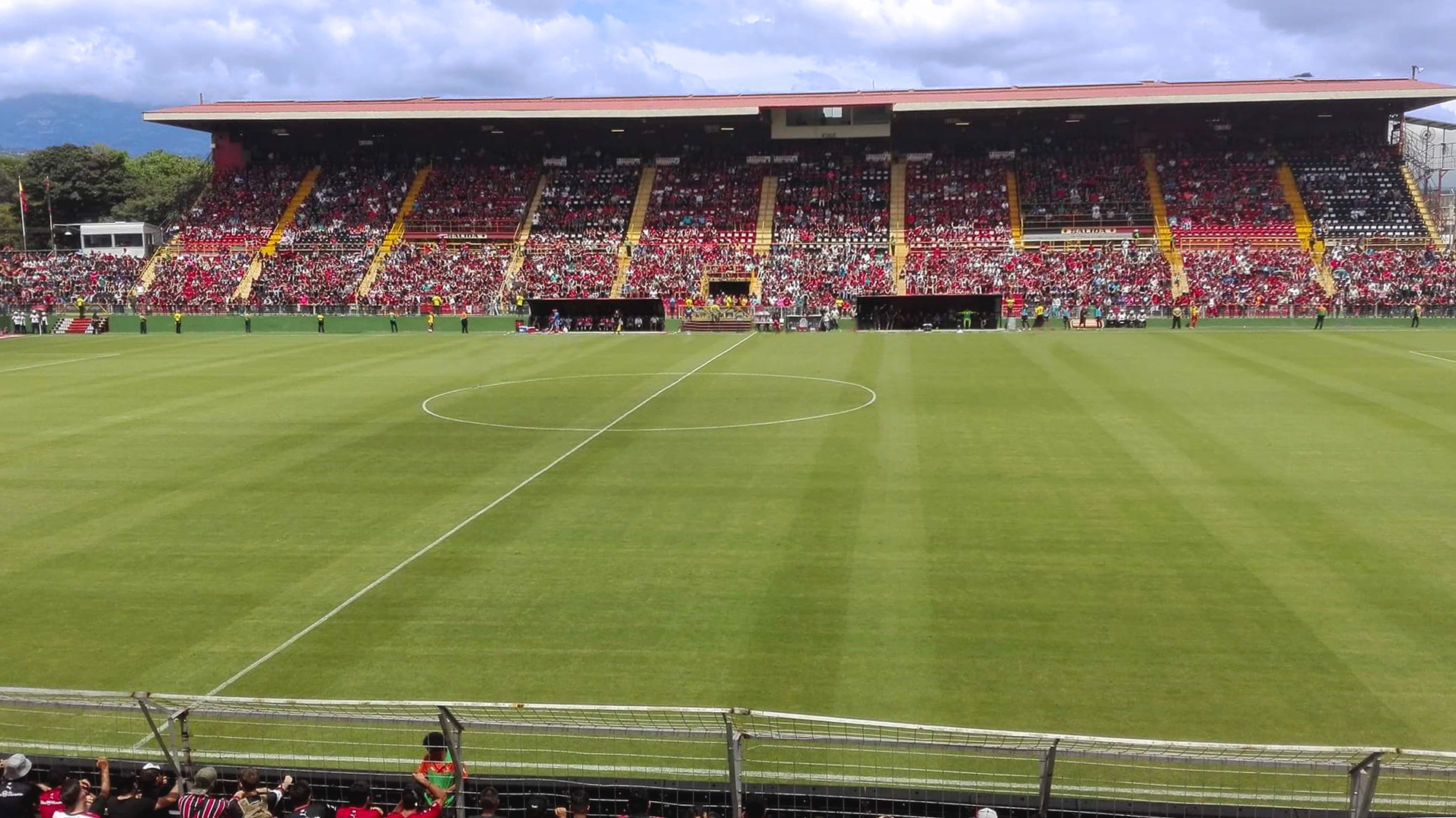
- Interactive map of Estadio Alejandro Morera Soto
- Full name: Estadio Municipal Alejandro Morera Soto
- Former names: Estadio Municipal de Alajuela (1942–1966)
- Location: Alajuela, Costa Rica
- Coordinates: 10°1′18″N 84°12′33″W
- Owner: LD Alajuelense
- Operator: LD Alajuelense
- Capacity: 18,895
- Surface: GrassMaster
- Scoreboard: Yes
- Field size: 105 m × 74 m (115 yd × 81 yd)

Construction
- Groundbreaking: 1940
- Opened: January 18, 1942

Tenant
- Liga Deportiva Alajuelense (1938–present)

The Estadio Alejandro Morera Soto is a football stadium in El Llano neighborhood of Alajuela, Costa Rica, which is the home of Liga Deportiva Alajuelense, one of the most successful football clubs from Costa Rica. It also serves as the home ground of Carmelita, who rent the stadium from Alajuelense.

The stadium, which has a capacity of 18,895 people, is named after Alejandro Morera Soto, a notable former player of LD Alajuelense, FC Barcelona, and Hércules CF.

== History ==
=== Construction ===
The project to find a proper site for a permanent home started in 1938 when the director of the club, Carlos Bolaños, proposed that the club should purchase its own land. The land was purchased in 1940, but the site would not be soccer-ready until 1942, when Alajuelense played its first match at the site. The first game was played on January 18, 1942, when Liga Deportiva Alajuelense played Club Sport Cartagines. The Estadio Alejandro Morera Soto is known as the Cathedral of Costa Rican Soccer.

On September 27, 1949, a professor from a local high school named Armando Morux Sancho started what was called "La marcha del ladrillo" (The Brick's March) in which every student would donate a brick to help building the concrete walls of the stadium and start building the concrete stands. The first stands that were built were the ones located in north, west an east around the pitch.

On July 20, 1966, due to a motion by the Municipality of Alajuela, the stadium was renamed to honor the great Alajuelense and Barcelona player Alejandro Morera Soto. On March 19, 1970, the stadium saw its first night game when Alajuelense faced Honduran club team Motagua, beating them 4–1.

In 1979, the enlargement of the stadium was initiated with the project of building a second stand on top of the first already built and add an additional stand over the dressing and conference room (south) and also, add roof to the stand located on east and the one located on south after was finished. The project was fully completed in 1984. The stadium was re-inaugurated that year along with the new illumination, which was at the moment, in the top illuminations systems.

=== Development ===
Costa Rican football started getting more attention by the international press after the national team participated to the World Cup in 1990 and with footballers playing abroad. The club decided to build a royal box in the top of the west stand, which would have a two-floor royal box with TVs, carpet, bathrooms, elevator, and air conditioner. The royal box was finished in 1999 and is the only team in Costa Rica with such an amenity.

In 1997, the Municipality of Alajuela agreed to change the name from Estadio Municipal de Alajuela to Estadio Alejandro Morera Soto.

In 2002, the illumination system was upgraded, being the stadium with the best illumination in the country.

Until 2005, the Morera Soto's grass was known as the best natural one in Central America, but a combination of fungus and hurricanes affected the grass and it never fully recovered. By the end of 2008, the management of the team decided to install a fifth-generation synthetic grass, in order to have the field always ready for games no matter the weather, also have the availability to rent the venue for music concerts and/or special events and have the possibility for the younger divisions to train in the same field. The last game the team played on the natural turf was the first game of the 2008 winter's final, beating their archrival Deportivo Saprissa 2–0 on December 17, 2008.

In 2009, the club installed a synthetic turf called Xtreme Turf from ACT Global Sports. This football turf has achieved FIFA two-star certification for approval for top international matches. This is the only FIFA two-star installation currently in Central America. After a long delay, the field was ready to be used by July 18, 2009. The field's re-opening game was held against Caracas FC from Venezuela; the game ended up with a tie 1–1.

On July 3, 2011, the stadium name was changed from "Estadio Alejandro Morera Soto" to "Estadio Alejandro Morera Soto Scotiabank", due to sponsorship from Scotiabank.

== International events ==
=== 2010 CONCACAF Women's U-17 Championship ===
The Estadio Alejandro Morera Soto hosted the 2010 CONCACAF Women's U-17 Championship. It hosted six Group A matches, including the opener; six Group B games; two semifinal matches; the third-place play-off; and the final. The games were:

Date	Team #1	Result	Team #2	Round	Attendance
10 March 2010	Panama	0–6	Mexico	Group A (opening match)	251
10 March 2010	Jamaica	1–4	Canada	Group A	251
11 March 2010	Haiti	0–9	United States	Group B	751
11 March 2010	Costa Rica	7–0	Cayman Islands	Group B	751
12 March 2010	Mexico	3–0	Jamaica	Group A	381
12 March 2010	Panama	1–2	Canada	Group A	381
13 March 2010	United States	13–0	Cayman Islands	Group B	800
13 March 2010	Costa Rica	2–0	Haiti	Group B	800
14 March 2010	Jamaica	2–0	Panama	Group A	381
14 March 2010	Canada	0–1	Mexico	Group A	381
15 March 2010	Cayman Islands	1–0	Haiti	Group B	1,700
15 March 2010	Costa Rica	0–10	United States	Group B	1,700
18 March 2010	Mexico	3–1 (a.e.t.)	Costa Rica	Semi-finals	750
18 March 2010	United States	0–0 (3–5 p)	Canada	Semi-finals	750
20 March 2010	Costa Rica	0–6	United States	Third place match	259
20 March 2010	Mexico	0–1	Canada	Final	259

=== 2014 FIFA U-17 Women's World Cup ===
La Catedral del Fútbol hosted six games of the 2014 FIFA U-17 Women's World Cup. It hosted four Group D matches; a Group A and Group B game. The games were:

Date	Team #1	Result	Team #2	Round	Attendance
16 March 2014	Mexico	4–0	Colombia	Group D	4,300
16 March 2014	China	1–2	Nigeria	Group D	4,300
19 March 2014	Mexico	4–0	China	Group D	4,629
19 March 2014	Colombia	1–2	Nigeria	Group D	4,629
22 March 2014	North Korea	4–3	Germany	Group B	5,863
22 March 2014	Venezuela	1–0	Italy	Group A	5,863

=== 2022 FIFA U-20 Women's World Cup ===
Estadio Alejandro Morera Soto hosted 14 games of the 2022 FIFA U-20 Women's World Cup. It hosted two Group A matches; four Group B games, including the opener; two Group C games, four Group D games; and two quarterfinal matches. The games were:

Date	Team #1	Result	Team #2	Round	Attendance
10 August 2022	Germany	0–1	Colombia	Group B (opening match)	1,158
10 August 2022	New Zealand	1–1	Mexico	Group B	1,007
11 August 2022	Ghana	0–3	United States	Group D	987
11 August 2022	Japan	1–0	Netherlands	Group D	877
13 August 2022	Germany	3–0	New Zealand	Group B	1,391
13 August 2022	Brazil	2–0	Australia	Group A	1,759
14 August 2022	Japan	2–0	Ghana	Group D	765
14 August 2022	South Korea	0–1	Nigeria	Group C	482
16 August 2022	Mexico	1–0	Germany	Group B	1,218
16 August 2022	Australia	0–3	Spain	Group A	939
17 August 2022	United States	1–3	Japan	Group D	1,392
17 August 2022	Nigeria	3–1	Canada	Group C	973
21 August 2022	Nigeria	0–2	Netherlands	Quarter-finals	3,005
21 August 2022	Japan	3–3 (5–3 p)	France	Quarter-finals	2,979

== Other events ==
One of the main concerts the stadium held was Elton John during his tour "Made in England" in November 1995. The British heavy metal band Iron Maiden played in this stadium in 2009. Korn and P.O.D. offered a joint concert at the stadium in 2010.

The stadium hosted two WWE house shows: the first was SmackDown on February 13, 2010, and the second was RAW on February 25, 2011.
