= 2026 CONCACAF U-17 Women's World Cup qualification – Final round =

2026 Concacaf Women’s U-17 Qualifiers - Final Round
Tournament details
- Host country: Costa Rica
- City: Alajuela
- Dates: 17–22 March 2026
- Teams: 12 (from 1 confederation)
- Venue: 1 (in 1 host city)

Tournament statistics
- Matches played: 18
- Goals scored: 100 (5.56 per match)
- Top scorer(s): (United States) Deus Stanislaus (6 goals)

The 2026 CONCACAF U-17 Women's World Cup qualification, officially called the 2026 CONCACAF Women's U-17 Qualifiers Final Round, was the tournament to decide which teams would qualify for the 2026 FIFA U-17 Women's World Cup in Morocco. Four qualifying slots were allocated to CONCACAF.

Three group winners and one best-ranked runners-up from the round-robin competitions qualified for the U-17 Women's World Cup as CONCACAF's representatives.

== Qualification ==
Twenty-eight teams competed for eight spots, joining the four highest-seeded teams, the United States, Mexico, Canada, and Puerto Rico, in the competition's Final Round.

Team	Method of qualification	App.	Previous best performance	Previous World Cup appearances
United States	Four top-ranked entrants	10th	Champions (2008, 2012, 2016, 2018, 2022, 2024)	7
Mexico	Four top-ranked entrants	10th	Champions (2013)	8
Canada	Four top-ranked entrants	10th	Champions (2010)	8
Puerto Rico	Four top-ranked entrants	6th	Fourth place (2022)	0
Dominican Republic	Qualifying Group A winners	2nd	Quarter-finals (2022)	1
Panama	Qualifying Group B winners	6th	Fourth place (2012)	0
Haiti	Qualifying Group C winners	8th	Fourth place (2016, 2018, 2024)	0
Jamaica	Qualifying Group D winners	7th	Fourth place (2013)	0
Costa Rica	Qualifying Group E winners	8th	Runners-up (2008)	3
El Salvador	Qualifying Group F winners	6th	Quarter-finals (2022)	0
Nicaragua	Qualifying best two runners-up	4th	Round of 16 (2022)	0
Bermuda	Qualifying best two runners-up	4th	Group stage (2018, 2022)	0

== Venues ==
Costa Rica was announced as the host country of the tournament on 4 February 2026.

2026 CONCACAF U-17 Women's World Cup qualification – Final round is located in Costa Rica	Alajuela
2026 CONCACAF U-17 Women's World Cup qualification – Final round is located in Costa Rica	Complejo Deportivo FCRF-Plycem

== Draw ==
The draw of the tournament was held at 11:00 ET on 18 February 2026 at the CONCACAF Headquarters in Miami, Florida. The four highest-seeded teams, which qualified automatically for the tournament, took the first positions in Pot 1 and 2. The eight teams, that advanced from qualifying, were placed in pots based on the CONCACAF Women's Under-17 Ranking on 4 February 2026. Teams were drawn into three groups of four teams.

Pot 1	Pot 2	Pot 3	Pot 4
United States; Mexico; Canada	Puerto Rico; Costa Rica^{H}; El Salvador	Haiti; Panama; Dominican Republic	Nicaragua; Jamaica; Bermuda

== Groups ==
Tiebreakers

The ranking of teams in each group is determined as follows:

1. Points obtained in all group matches;
2. Goal difference in all group matches;
3. Goals scored in all group matches;
4. Points obtained among tied teams;
5. Goal difference among tied teams;
6. Goals scored among tied teams;
7. Fair play points in all group matches;
8. Latest Concacaf Women’s Under-17 Ranking.

=== Group A ===
Pos	Team	Pld	W	D	L	GF	GA	GD	Pts	Qualification
1	Canada	3	3	0	0	17	0	+17	9	2026 FIFA U-17 Women's World Cup
2	El Salvador	3	1	1	1	5	6	−1	4	
3	Dominican Republic	3	1	1	1	3	9	−6	4	
4	Nicaragua	3	0	0	3	1	11	−10	0	

Source: CONCACAF
Rules for classification: Tiebreakers
17 March 2026
17ː00 (15:00 UTC−6)

Canada	5–0	Nicaragua
Istocki 11'; Kindel 13', 33' (pen.); Boldt 27'; Fairweather 83'	Report; Report (CSA)

Proyecto Goal FCRF Cancha 2, Alajuela
Referee: Charlize Hood (Trinidad and Tobago)
17 March 2026
17:06 (15:06 UTC−6)

El Salvador	1–1	Dominican Republic
Torres 70'	Report	Romero 90+4'

Proyecto Goal FCRF Cancha 1, Alajuela
Referee: Saphire Stockman (Costa Rica)

19 March 2026
12:00 (10:00 UTC−6)

Dominican Republic	0–7	Canada
	Report	Istocki 6', 26'; Schwartzberg 23'; Fairweather 55'; Kindel 64'; Partovi 81'; Boldt 90+1'

Proyecto Goal FCRF Cancha 2, Alajuela
Referee: Génesis De León (Guatemala)
19 March 2026
12:06 (10:06 UTC−6)

Nicaragua	0–4	El Salvador
	Report	Menjívar 16' (pen.); Alvarenga 26'; Jones 53'; Álvarez 70'

Proyecto Goal FCRF Cancha 1, Alajuela
Referee: Erika González (Mexico)

22 March 2026
14:30 (12:30 UTC−6)

Dominican Republic	2–1	Nicaragua
Asenjo 2'; Pavón 38' (o.g.)	Report	Ruiz 43'

Proyecto Goal FCRF Cancha 2, Alajuela
Referee: Isabel Barillas (El Salvador)
22 March 2026
14:36 (12:36 UTC−6)

Canada	5–0	El Salvador
Tingley 22', 39'; Kindel 35'; Alexis 37'; Istocki 44'	Report

Proyecto Goal FCRF Cancha 1, Alajuela
Referee: Saphire Stockman (Costa Rica)

=== Group B ===
Pos	Team	Pld	W	D	L	GF	GA	GD	Pts	Qualification
1	United States	3	3	0	0	32	0	+32	9	2026 FIFA U-17 Women's World Cup
2	Puerto Rico	3	2	0	1	12	5	+7	6	2026 FIFA U-17 Women's World Cup
3	Haiti	3	1	0	2	3	12	−9	3	
4	Bermuda	3	0	0	3	0	30	−30	0	

Source: CONCACAF
Rules for classification: Tiebreakers
17 March 2026
14:30 (12:30 UTC−6)

United States	19–0	Bermuda
Stanislaus 3', 17', 53', 58'; Manning 5', 8'; Morrell 27', 39', 56'; Corona 47'; DiMaria 49', 52'; Paletta 59'; Whitham 69', 78', 86'; Aguilar 83'; Heathcock 84'; Hanf 87'	Report; Report (USSF)

Proyecto Goal FCRF Cancha 2, Alajuela
Referee: Minely Ureña (Dominican Republic)
17 March 2026
14:36 (12:36 UTC−6)

Puerto Rico	3–1	Haiti
Colón 43'; Falcón 45' (pen.); Poidomani 67'	Report	Larco 45+2'

Proyecto Goal FCRF Cancha 1, Alajuela
Referee: Kenisha Prescott (Guyana)

19 March 2026
17:00 (15:00 UTC−6)

Haiti	0–9	United States
	Report; Report (USSF)	Mallebranche 5' (o.g.); Murray 8'; Aguilar 25', 45+1', 52'; Whitham 57'; Paletta 62'; Stanislaus 79', 81'

Proyecto Goal FCRF Cancha 2, Alajuela
Attendance: 237
Referee: Marjorie Ponce (Nicaragua)
19 March 2026
17:06 (15:06 UTC−6)

Bermuda	0–9	Puerto Rico
	Report	Olmo 14'; Falcón 17', 34'; Colón 25'; Russel 53'; Adame 66', 72' (pen.); Melia 81'; Mateo 87'

Proyecto Goal FCRF Cancha 1, Alajuela
Referee: Kedeen Foster (Cayman Islands)

22 March 2026
12:00 (10:00 UTC−6)

Haiti	2–0	Bermuda
Kamanzi-Mondestin 15'; N. Jean-Baptiste 86'	Report

Proyecto Goal FCRF Cancha 2, Alajuela
Referee: Crystal Sobers (Trinidad and Tobago)
22 March 2026
12:06 (10:06 UTC−6)

United States	4–0	Puerto Rico
DiMaria 22' (pen.); Corona 36'; Whitham 50'; Morrell 55'	Report; Report (USSF)

Proyecto Goal FCRF Cancha 1, Alajuela
Attendance: 174
Referee: Marjorie Ponce (Nicaragua)

=== Group C ===
Pos	Team	Pld	W	D	L	GF	GA	GD	Pts	Qualification
1	Mexico	3	3	0	0	17	1	+16	9	2026 FIFA U-17 Women's World Cup
2	Costa Rica (H)	3	2	0	1	4	3	+1	6	
3	Panama	3	1	0	2	5	10	−5	3	
4	Jamaica	3	0	0	3	1	13	−12	0	

Source: CONCACAF
Rules for classification: Tiebreakers
(H) Hosts
17 March 2026
12:00 (10:00 UTC−6)

Mexico	9–0	Jamaica
Reyes 3', 40', 50'; Urbano 7', 17', 64'; Uscanga 70'; Delgado 87'; Arredondo 89'	Report

Proyecto Goal FCRF Cancha 2, Alajuela
Referee: Sandra Benítez (El Salvador)
17 March 2026
12:06 (10:06 UTC−6)

Costa Rica	3–1	Panama
Aparicio 29' (o.g.); Paniagua 35' (pen.), 45+4'	Report	Ríos 57'

Proyecto Goal FCRF Cancha 1, Alajuela
Referee: Crystal Sobers (Trinidad and Tobago)

19 March 2026
14:30 (12:30 UTC−6)

Panama	1–6	Mexico
Ríos 40'	Report	Pérez 28'; Sánchez 31'; Paredes 45'; Rojo 69'; Reyes 73'; Uscanga 77'

Proyecto Goal FCRF Cancha 2, Alajuela
Referee: Isabel Barillas (El Salvador)
19 March 2026
14:36 (12:36 UTC−6)

Jamaica	0–1	Costa Rica
	Report	Paniagua 45+5'

Proyecto Goal FCRF Cancha 1, Alajuela
Referee: Belkis Flores (Honduras)

22 March 2026
17:00 (15:00 UTC−6)

Panama	3–1	Jamaica
Ríos 25'; Zafrani 81'; Wakefield 90+1'	Report	Jones 50'

Proyecto Goal FCRF Cancha 2, Alajuela
Referee: Charlize Hood (Trinidad and Tobago)
22 March 2026
17:06 (15:06 UTC−6)

Mexico	2–0	Costa Rica
Reyes 43'; García 81'	Report

Proyecto Goal FCRF Cancha 1, Alajuela
Referee: Marjorie Ponce (Nicaragua)

=== Ranking of second-placed teams ===
Pos	Grp	Team	Pld	W	D	L	GF	GA	GD	Pts	Qualification
1	B	Puerto Rico	3	2	0	1	12	5	+7	6	2026 FIFA U-17 Women's World Cup
2	C	Costa Rica (H)	3	2	0	1	4	3	+1	6	
3	A	El Salvador	3	1	1	1	5	6	−1	4	

Source: CONCACAF
Rules for classification: 1) points; 2) goal difference; 3) goals scored; 4) fair play points; 5) Latest Concacaf Women’s Under-17 Ranking.
(H) Hosts

== Qualified teams for FIFA U-17 Women's World Cup ==
The following four teams from CONCACAF qualified for the 2026 FIFA U-17 Women's World Cup.

Team	Qualified on	Previous appearances in FIFA U-17 Women's World Cup
Canada	22 March 2026	8 (2008, 2010, 2012, 2014, 2016, 2018, 2022, 2025)
United States	22 March 2026	7 (2008, 2012, 2016, 2018, 2022, 2024, 2025)
Mexico	22 March 2026	8 (2010, 2012, 2014, 2016, 2018, 2022, 2024, 2025)
Puerto Rico	22 March 2026	0 (debut)
