= CONCACAF Women's U-17 Championship =

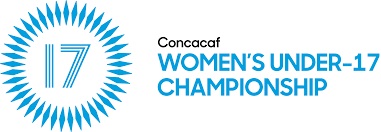
- Organizer(s): CONCACAF
- Founded: 2008
- Region: North America, Central America and the Caribbean
- Teams: 20
- Qualifier for: FIFA U-17 Women's World Cup
- Current champion(s): United States (6th title)
- Most championships: United States (6 titles)
- Website: CONCACAF Women's U-17 Championship
- 2026 CONCACAF U-17 Women's World Cup qualifiers

The CONCACAF Women's Under-17 tournament is a football (soccer) competition for women's national teams under 17 years of age in North America, Central America, and the Caribbean region and is the qualification tournament for the FIFA U-17 Women's World Cup. A tournament is an eight-nation event, with three teams qualifying for the World Cup.

== History ==
=== 2008 ===
After sanctioning its first women's youth world championship in 2002, FIFA added the FIFA U-17 Women's World Cup to its calendar of events in 2008. CONCACAF, likewise, began its U-17 Women's Championship the same year, staging the inaugural event in Trinidad & Tobago. The United States won the inaugural U-17 Women's Championship, defeating Costa Rica 4–1 in the final.

=== 2012 ===
The qualification process for the 2012 tournament started on 14 August 2011.

== Results ==
Year	Host	Final			Third place play-off
Year	Host	Champions	Score	Runners-up	Third Place	Score	Fourth Place
2008 details	Trinidad and Tobago	United States	4–1	Costa Rica	Canada	1–0	Mexico
2010 details	Costa Rica	Canada	1–0	Mexico	United States	6–0	Costa Rica
2012 details	Guatemala	United States	1–0	Canada	Mexico	6–0	Panama
2013 details	Jamaica	Mexico	0–0; 4–2 (p)	Canada	United States	8–0	Jamaica
2016 details	Grenada	United States	2–1	Mexico	Canada	4–2	Haiti
2018 details	Nicaragua; United States	United States	3–2	Mexico	Canada	2–1	Haiti
2020 details	Mexico	Cancelled due to COVID-19 pandemic			Cancelled due to COVID-19 pandemic
2022 details	Dominican Republic	United States	2–1	Mexico	Canada	3–0	Puerto Rico
2024 details	Mexico	United States	4–0	Mexico	Canada	4–1	Haiti

CONCACAF U-17 Women's World Cup qualifiers
2025 details	Multiple	Qualified teams: Group A: Mexico, Costa Rica; Group B: Canada; Group C: United States
2026 details	Costa Rica	Qualified teams: Group A: Canada; Group B: United States, Puerto Rico; Group C: Mexico

== Performance by team ==
Team	Champions	Runners-up	Third place	Fourth place
United States	6 (2008, 2012, 2016, 2018, 2022, 2024)	–	2 (2010, 2013)	–
Mexico	1 (2013)	5 (2010, 2016, 2018, 2022, 2024)	1 (2012)	1 (2008)
Canada	1 (2010)	2 (2012, 2013)	5 (2008, 2016, 2018, 2022, 2024)	–
Costa Rica	–	1 (2008)	–	1 (2010)
Haiti	–	–	–	3 (2016, 2018, 2024)
Panama	–	–	–	1 (2012)
Jamaica	–	–	–	1 (2013)
Puerto Rico	–	–	–	1 (2022)

== Participating nations ==
Legend

- 1st – Champions
- 2nd – Runners-up
- 3rd – Third place
- 4th – Fourth place
- QF – Quarterfinals
- GS – Group stage
- R16 – Round of 16
- GW – Group winner and advance to World Cup
- A – Advance to World Cup
- FR – Final round
- Q – Qualified for upcoming tournament
- — Hosts
- -- – Did not qualify/enter to final tournament/round

Team	(Trinidad and Tobago) 2008	(Costa Rica) 2010	(Guatemala) 2012	(Jamaica) 2013	(Grenada) 2016	(Nicaragua) (United States) 2018	(Dominican Republic) 2022	(Mexico) 2024	2025	(Costa Rica) 2026	Part.
Bahamas	--	--	GS	--	--	--	--	--	--	--	1
Bermuda	--	--	--	--	--	GS	GS	--	FR	FR	4
Canada	3rd	1st	2nd	2nd	3rd	3rd	3rd	3rd	GW	GW	10
Cayman Islands	--	GS	--	--	--	--	--	--	--	--	1
Costa Rica	2nd	4th	--	--	GS	GS	QF	GS	A	FR	8
Cuba	--	--	--	--	--	--	R16	--	--	--	1
Curaçao	--	--	--	--	--	--	R16	--	--	--	1
Dominican Republic	--	--	--	--	--	--	QF	--	--	FR	2
El Salvador	GS	--	--	GS	--	--	QF	GS	FR	FR	6
Grenada	--	--	--	--	GS	--	GS	--	--	--	2
Guatemala	--	--	GS	GS	GS	--	GS	--	--	--	4
Guyana	--	--	--	--	--	--	R16	--	--	--	1
Haiti	--	GS	--	GS	4th	4th	R16	4th	FR	FR	8
Honduras	--	--	--	--	--	--	R16	--	FR	--	2
Jamaica	GS	GS	GS	4th	GS	--	QF	--	--	FR	8
Mexico	4th	2nd	3rd	1st	2nd	2nd	2nd	2nd	GW	GW	10
Nicaragua	--	--	--	--	--	GS	R16	--	FR	FR	4
Panama	--	GS	4th	--	--	--	R16	GS	FR	FR	6
Puerto Rico	GS	--	--	--	--	GS	4th	GS	FR	A	6
Saint Kitts and Nevis	--	--	--	--	--	--	R16	--	--	--	1
Trinidad and Tobago	GS	--	GS	GS	--	--	GS	--	FR	--	5
United States	1st	3rd	1st	3rd	1st	1st	1st	1st	GW	GW	10

== Awards ==
=== Golden Boot ===
Year	Player	Goals
2008	(Canada) Tiffany Cameron (Costa Rica) Katherine Alvarado (United States) Courtney Verloo	5
2010	(United States) Lindsey Horan	8
2012	(United States) Summer Green	12
2013	(Canada) Marie-Mychèle Métivier	6
2016	(Haiti) Nérilia Mondésir	7
2018	(Haiti) Melchie Dumornay (Mexico) Alison González (Note: González was awarded the Golden Boot based on having the most assists. "CU17W: Golden Boot—Alison González". Concacaf (in Spanish). June 13, 2018.) (United States) Sunshine Fontes	5
2022	(Canada) Rosa Maalouf	12
2024	(Haiti) Lourdjina Étienne (United States) Kennedy Fuller (Note: Fuller was awarded the Golden Boot based on having the most assists. "Étienne, Fuller lead honors at Women's Under-17 Championship". Concacaf. February 11, 2024.)	8

=== Golden Ball ===
Year	Player
2013	(Canada) Jessie Fleming
2016	(United States) Ashley Sanchez
2018	(Haiti) Melchie Dumornay
2022	(United States) Riley Jackson
2024	(Haiti) Lourdjina Étienne

=== Golden Glove ===
Year	Player
2013	(Canada) Rylee Foster
2016	(United States) Laurel Ivory
2018	(United States) Angelina Anderson
2022	(United States) Victoria Safradin
2024	(Mexico) Camila Vázquez

=== CONCACAF Fair Play Award ===
Year	Team
2016	Mexico
2018	United States
2022	Mexico
2024	United States

== Results at the FIFA U-17 Women's World Cup ==
Since its inception in 2008, all editions have qualified three teams to the FIFA U-17 Women's World Cup. The United States finished 2nd in the 2008 edition in New Zealand, Mexico finished 2nd in the 2018 edition in Uruguay, Canada finished 4th also in 2018, with all other qualified CONCACAF nations getting eliminated in the group stages.

Legend

- 2nd – Runners-up
- 3rd – Third place
- 4th – Fourth place
- QF = Quarter-finals
- R16 = Round of 16
- GS = Group stage
- Q = Qualified
- • – Did not qualify
- × – Did not enter / Withdrew / Banned
- – Hosts

World Cup	(New Zealand) 2008	(Trinidad and Tobago) 2010	(Azerbaijan) 2012	(Costa Rica) 2014	(Jordan) 2016	(Uruguay) 2018	(India) 2022	(Dominican Republic) 2024	(Morocco) 2025	(Morocco) 2026	Total
Canada	QF	GS	QF	QF	GS	4th	GS	•	QF	GS	9
Costa Rica	GS	•	•	GS	•	•	•	•	GS	•	3
Dominican Republic	×	•	•	•	•	•	•	GS	•	•	1
Mexico	•	GS	GS	QF	QF	2nd	GS	GS	3rd	R16	9
Puerto Rico	•	•	•	•	•	•	•	•	•	GS	1
Trinidad and Tobago	•	GS	•	•	•	•	•	•	•	•	1
United States	2nd	•	GS	•	GS	GS	QF	3rd	R16	QF	8
Total	3	3	3	3	3	3	3	3	4	4	

== Winning coaches ==
Year	Team	Coach
2008	United States	(United States) Kazbek Tambi
2010	Canada	(Canada) Byran Rosenfeld
2012	United States	(United States) Albertin Montoya
2013	Mexico	(Mexico) Leonardo Cuéllar
2016	United States	(United States) B. J. Snow
2018	United States	(England) Mark Carr
2022	United States	(Spain) Natalia Astrain
2024	United States	(United States) Katie Schoepfer

== See also ==
- FIFA Women's U-17 World Cup
- CONCACAF Women's U-20 Championship
- CONCACAF U17 Championship
