= Canada women's national under-17 soccer team =

National association soccer team

Canada Women's U-17
- Nickname(s): The Canucks, Les Rouges (The Reds)
- Association: Canadian Soccer Association
- Confederation: CONCACAF (North America)
- Head coach: Jen Herst
- FIFA code: CAN
First colours	Second colours

FIFA U-17 Women's World Cup
- Appearances: 9 (first in 2008)
- Best result: Fourth place (2018)

CONCACAF Women's U-17 Championship
- Appearances: 6 (first in 2008)
- Best result: Winners (2010)

The Canada U-17 women's national soccer team (also known as Canada Under-17s or Canada U-17s) represents Canada in international soccer at this age level. They are overseen by the Canadian Soccer Association, the governing body for soccer in Canada.

== History ==
At the 2008 FIFA U-17 Women's World Cup, Canada advanced out of group stage where they were defeated by Germany in the quarterfinals. Canada won the 2010 CONCACAF Women's U-17 Championship after beating Mexico in the final, but were eliminated at group stage of the 2010 FIFA U-17 Women's World Cup. At the 2012 FIFA U-17 Women's World Cup, Canada matched their best appearance, dropping their quarterfinal game to North Korea.

Bev Priestman took over duties from Bryan Rosenfeld in 2013 to direct the new Women's Excel Program (U-14/U-17). Priestman previously assisted Canada's senior coach, John Herdman, when both coached in the New Zealand women's program. Qualifying second out of CONCACAF, Canada was drawn into the "group of death" at the 2014 FIFA U-17 Women's World Cup with European champions Germany, African champions Ghana, and Asian runners-up North Korea. Canada tied their first two games and secured a quarterfinal berth by defeating group winners Ghana in the final group stage game. Canada lost their quarterfinal match 3–2 to Venezuela.

At the 2016 CONCACAF Women's U-17 Championship in Grenada, Canada were drawn in Group A with Haiti, Guatemala, and Grenada. They recorded wins over Guatemala (3–0) and Grenada (7–0), but lost to Haiti (1–2), finishing second in the group. In the semifinals, Canada were defeated 5–0 by United States, then won the third-place match 4–2 against Haiti to qualify for the 2016 FIFA U-17 Women's World Cup.

For the 2016 FIFA U-17 Women's World Cup in Jordan, Canada were drawn into Group B with Cameroon, Germany, and Venezuela. Canada opened the tournament with a 3–2 win over Cameroon. They then drew 1–1 with Germany before finishing group play with a 0–2 loss to Venezuela, resulting in a third-place finish in the group and elimination from the tournament.

Canada resumed regional competition at the 2018 CONCACAF Women's U-17 Championship, entering Group B alongside Costa Rica, the United States, and Bermuda. The tournament was initially staged in Nicaragua but was suspended due to civil unrest, with CONCACAF later relocating and completing the event in Bradenton, Florida. Canada finished second in the group after a win over Bermuda and a draw with Costa Rica. Their semifinal loss to Mexico (3–2) sent them to the third-place match, where a 4–1 victory over Haiti secured qualification for the 2018 FIFA U-17 Women's World Cup.

Canada returned to the global stage at the 2018 FIFA U-17 Women's World Cup in Uruguay, joining Group D with Spain, Colombia, and South Korea. Group-stage wins over Colombia and South Korea sent Canada to the knockout phase, where they defeated Germany 1–0 in the quarterfinals. A 2–0 semifinal loss to Mexico ended their title hopes, and a 2–1 defeat to New Zealand left Canada in fourth place, marking their best-ever performance at the tournament.

In the cycle following their fourth-place finish in 2018, Canada entered the 2020 CONCACAF Women's U-17 Championship in Mexico, but the tournament was cancelled mid-competition due to the global COVID-19 pandemic. As a result, qualification for the planned 2020 FIFA U-17 Women's World Cup was voided after FIFA officially cancelled the event.

Canada began their campaign at the 2022 CONCACAF Women's U-17 Championship, hosted in the Dominican Republic. Drawn into Group F with Jamaica, the Dominican Republic, and Bermuda, the Canadians opened with a 10–0 victory over the Dominican Republic and followed with a 5–0 win against Bermuda. Their final group match ended in a 1–1 draw with Jamaica, leaving Canada second in the group on goal difference and advancing to the knockout stage. In the quarterfinals, they defeated Costa Rica 3–0 to reach the semifinals, where they were eliminated 3–0 by the United States. A 3–0 win over Puerto Rico in the third-place playoff secured qualification for the 2022 FIFA U-17 Women's World Cup.

At the 2022 FIFA U-17 Women's World Cup in India, Canada were drawn into Group D alongside France, Japan, and the Tanzania. They opened the tournament with a 1–1 draw against France, followed by a 4–0 defeat against Japan. In their final group match, Canada tied 1–1 with Tanzania, finishing third in the group and exiting the competition at the group stage.

== Fixtures and results ==
The following is a list of match results in the last twelve months, as well as any future matches that have been scheduled.

Win Draw Loss Fixture

=== 2025 ===
October 19 FIFA U-17 Women's World Cup	Nigeria	1–4	Canada	Salé, Morocco
15:00 EDT	Joseph 30'	Report	Istocki 2'; Kekić 73'; Amireh 80', 86'	Stadium: Mohammed VI Football Academy(pitch 2); Attendance: 637; Referee: Olatz Rivera Olmedo (Spain)

October 22 FIFA U-17 Women's World Cup	Samoa	0–6	Canada	Salé, Morocco
12:00 EDT		Report	Feria-Estrada 14'; Chisholm 36'; Kindel 54'; Martineau 58'; Amireh 67'; Afoa 90+2' (o.g.)	Stadium: Mohammed VI Football Academy (pitch 1); Attendance: 876; Referee: Josephine Wanjiru (Kenya)

== Players ==
=== Current roster ===
The following 21 players were called up for the 2025 FIFA U-17 Women's World Cup.

No.	Pos.	Player	Date of birth (age)	Club
1	GK	Olivia Busby	February 5, 2008 (age 18)	(Canadian Soccer Association) NDC-CDN Ontario and Halifax Tides
18	GK	Khadijah Cissé	May 18, 2008 (age 18)	(United States Soccer Federation) University of Kentucky
21	GK	Kylie Sandulak	May 18, 2008 (age 18)	(Canadian Soccer Association) Rise FC Academy
2	DF	Marika Martineau	July 22, 2008 (age 18)	(Canadian Soccer Association) CF Montréal Academy
3	DF	Mya Angus	March 21, 2008 (age 18)	(Canadian Soccer Association) NDC-CDN Ontario
4	MF	Chloe Taylor	September 2, 2008 (age 18)	(Canadian Soccer Association) Vancouver Rise
5	DF	Bridget Mutipula	August 5, 2008 (age 18)	(Canadian Soccer Association) Vancouver Rise
12	DF	Emma Donnelly	March 26, 2008 (age 18)	(Canadian Soccer Association) NDC-CDN Ontario
15	DF	Naomi Lofthouse	January 9, 2008 (age 18)	(Canadian Soccer Association) OSU and Ottawa Ripid
16	DF	Amy Medley	September 12, 2008 (age 18)	(Canadian Soccer Association) CF Montréal Academy
6	MF	Felicia Hanisch	September 22, 2008 (age 18)	(Canadian Soccer Association) OSU
8	MF	Olivia Chisholm	December 5, 2008 (age 17)	(Canadian Soccer Association) NDC-CDN Ontario and AFC Toronto
10	MF	Gabriela Istocki	July 25, 2009 (age 17)	(Canadian Soccer Association) NDC-CDN Ontario
14	MF	Daniela Feria-Estrada	April 13, 2009 (age 17)	(Canadian Soccer Association) Rise FC Academy
20	MF	Julia Amireh	October 19, 2008 (age 18)	(United States Soccer Federation) NC Courage
7	FW	Lacey Kindel	September 27, 2009 (age 17)	(Canadian Soccer Association) Rise FC Academy
9	FW	Melisa Kekic	April 27, 2008 (age 18)	(Canadian Soccer Association) NDC-CDN Ontario and AFC Toronto
11	FW	Molly Hale	January 20, 2008 (age 18)	(Canadian Soccer Association) NDC-CDN Ontario
13	FW	Mélyna Alexis	October 15, 2009 (age 17)	(Canadian Soccer Association) CF Montréal Academy
17	FW	Alyssa McLeod	June 15, 2009 (age 17)	(Canadian Soccer Association) NDC-CDN Ontario
19	FW	Reed Tingley	September 3, 2009 (age 17)	(United States Soccer Federation) Concorde Fire SC

=== Previous squads ===
- 2013 CONCACAF Women's U-17 Championship
- 2014 FIFA U-17 Women's World Cup
- 2016 CONCACAF Women's U-17 Championship
- 2016 FIFA U-17 Women's World Cup
- 2018 CONCACAF Women's U-17 Championship
- 2018 FIFA U-17 Women's World Cup

== Competitive record ==
Champions Runners-up Third place Tournament played fully or partially on home soil

=== FIFA U-17 Women's World Cup ===
Year	Result	Pld	W	D*	L	GF	GA
(New Zealand) 2008	Quarter-finals	4	1	2	1	3	4
(Trinidad and Tobago) 2010	Group stage	3	1	0	2	1	3
(Azerbaijan) 2012	Quarter-finals	4	2	1	1	4	3
(Costa Rica) 2014	Quarter-finals	4	1	2	1	7	7
(Jordan) 2016	Group stage	3	1	1	1	4	5
(Uruguay) 2018	Fourth place	6	3	0	3	7	8
(India) 2022	Group stage	3	0	2	1	2	6
(Dominican Republic) 2024	Did not qualify						
(Morocco) 2025	Quarter-finals	5	4	1	0	18	2
(Morocco) 2026	Group stage	3	1	0	2	5	10
(Morocco) 2027	To be determined						
(Morocco) 2028	To be determined						
(Morocco) 2029	To be determined						
Total	9/13	35	14	9	12	51	48

* Draws include knockout matches decided by penalty shoot-out.

=== CONCACAF U-17 Championship ===
CONCACAF Women's U-17 Championship record
Year	Result	Matches	Wins	Draws	Losses	GF	GA
(Trinidad and Tobago) 2008	Third place	5	4	0	1	12	6
(Costa Rica) 2010	Champions	5	3	1	1	7	3
(Guatemala) 2012	Runners-up	5	4	0	1	17	2
(Jamaica) 2013	Runners-up	5	3	1	1	24	2
(Grenada) 2016	Third place	5	3	0	2	15	9
(Nicaragua) (United States) 2018	Third place	5	3	0	2	8	5
(Mexico) 2020	Cancelled due to COVID-19 pandemic						
(Dominican Republic) 2022	Third place	5	5	1	1	26	5
(Mexico) 2024	Third place	5	3	0	2	15	9
CONCACAF U-17 Women's World Cup qualifiers
2025	Group winner						
(Costa Rica) 2026	Group winner						
Total	9/9	40	28	3	11	124	41

== Honours ==
=== Regional ===
- CONCACAF U-17 Championship: 2010

== See also ==
- Canada women's national soccer team
- Canada women's national under-20 soccer team
- Canada girls' national under-15 soccer team
- Soccer in Canada

== Head-to-head record ==
The following table shows Canada's head-to-head record in the FIFA U-17 Women's World Cup.

Opponent	Pld	W	D	L	GF	GA	GD	Win %
Azerbaijan	1	1	0	0	1	0	+1	100.00
Brazil	3	0	1	2	2	8	−6	0.00
Cameroon	1	1	0	0	3	2	+1	100.00
Colombia	3	2	1	0	5	1	+4	66.67
Denmark	1	0	1	0	0	0	+0	0.00
France	2	1	1	0	3	2	+1	50.00
Germany	4	1	2	1	5	6	−1	25.00
Ghana	3	2	0	1	3	3	+0	66.67
Japan	1	0	0	1	0	4	−4	0.00
Mexico	1	0	0	1	0	1	−1	0.00
New Zealand	2	1	0	1	2	2	+0	50.00
Nigeria	2	1	1	0	5	2	+3	50.00
North Korea	2	0	1	1	2	3	−1	0.00
Norway	1	1	0	0	3	2	+1	100.00
Republic of Ireland	1	0	0	1	0	1	−1	0.00
Samoa	1	1	0	0	6	0	+6	100.00
South Korea	1	1	0	0	2	0	+2	100.00
Spain	1	0	0	1	0	5	−5	0.00
Tanzania	1	0	1	0	1	1	+0	0.00
Venezuela	2	0	0	2	2	5	−3	0.00
Zambia	1	1	0	0	6	0	+6	100.00
Total	35	14	9	12	51	48	+3	40.00
