= Miguel Gamero =

Mexican football manager (born 1979)

Personal information
- Full name: Miguel Ángel Gamero Villalobos
- Date of birth: 30 September 1982 (age 44)
- Place of birth: Guadalajara, Jalisco, Mexico
- Height: 1.74 m (5 ft 9 in)

Team information
- Current team: Mexico U–17 women (Manager)

Managerial career
- Years: Team
- 2009–2016: Guadalajara Reserves and Academy
- 2016: Coras F.C. (Assistant)
- 2017–2018: Mexico U–17 women (Assistant)
- 2019–2020: Mexico U–20 women (Assistant)
- 2021–2022: Mexico women (Assistant)
- 2022: Mexico women (Interim)
- 2024–: Mexico U–17 women

Miguel Ángel Gamero Villalobos (born 29 July 1979) is a Mexican manager who is the current manager of Mexico U–17 women .

== Coaching career ==
Gamero started his coaching career in the academy staff of C.D. Guadalajara, from 2009 to 2016. In 2016, Gamero joined the staff of Coras F.C.. He was part of the coaching staff of the Mexico U-17 women's national football team that finished as Runners-up at the 2018 FIFA U-17 Women's World Cup, falling to Spain in the Final, 1–2. In 2022, Gamero was named the interim coach for Mexico women. In 2024, Gamero was appointed as manager of Mexico U–17 women.
