= Diana González =

Mexican footballer (1993–2019)

Personal information
- Full name: Diana Victoria González Barrera
- Date of birth: 10 September 1993
- Place of birth: Toluca, Mexico
- Date of death: 1 November 2019 (aged 26)
- Place of death: Mexico City, Mexico
- Height: 1.65 m (5 ft 5 in)
- Position: Midfielder

Senior career*
Years	Team	Apps	(Gls)
2018–2019	América	18	(5)

International career^{‡}
2010	Mexico U17	3	(0)
- * Club domestic league appearances and goals as of 21 February 2019 ‡ National team caps and goals as of 1 March 2019

Diana Victoria González Barrera (10 September 1993 – 1 November 2019) was a Mexican professional footballer who played as a midfielder. She spent her entire club career with Club América of Liga MX Femenil. She had been a member of the Mexico women's national under-17 team.

== Club career ==
=== América ===
González made her debut with Club América. At eight years old, she wished that in Mexico there was a professional soccer league for women equal to the manly one.

She debuted in the Liga MX Femenil on 23 July 2018 during a duel Club América vs Deportivo Toluca, being her first season in the 2018 Apertura Tournament (Mexico), in which she played seven games with a total of 526 minutes played. She scored four goals and received a yellow card.

In her second season, she played eleven games with a total of 670 minutes of action, with a single goal scored and received two yellow cards. González suffered knee injury in a match against Pachuca, in which she scored her first goal of the tournament, leaving her unable to play for six months.

She was in 2017 at the Telmex Telcel Championship, and in 2018 she was at the Telmex Telcel University Championship, where her team had won.

After many rumors and expectations in her hometown on 22 September 2017, she was presented by the 2018 opening before the UANL Tigers, however she trained with America looking for a position for a foreigner position in the first team.

== International career ==
González represented Mexico at the 2010 FIFA U-17 Women's World Cup.

== Death ==
González died on 1 November 2019 due to a decompensation in glucose levels after suffering from diabetes, she was 26 years old. She was the first player who had been featured in the Liga MX Femenil to die.

== Honours ==
Club América

- Liga MX Femenil: Apertura 2018
