= Miranda Solís =

Association football player (born 2008)

Personal information
- Full name: Miranda Solís Vargas
- Date of birth: 28 February 2008 (age 18)
- Place of birth: San José, Costa Rica
- Height: 1.60 m (5 ft 3 in)
- Position: Forward

Team information
- Current team: Monterrey

Youth career
- 2023–2024: Pumas UNAM
- 2024–: Monterrey

International career^{‡}
Years	Team	Apps	(Gls)
2024–2026	Mexico U17		
Medal record
Women's football
Representing Mexico
FIFA U-17 Women's World Cup
Third place	2025 Morocco
- ‡ National team caps and goals as of 9 November 2025

Miranda Solís Vargas (born 28 February 2008) is a Costa Rican professional footballer who plays as a forward for Liga MX Femenil club Monterrey. Born in Costa Rica, she played for the Mexico under-17 national team before committing to the Costa Rica national team.

== International career ==
Solís was born in Costa Rica and is of Mexican descent, holding dual citizenship. During the 2025 FIFA U-17 Women's World Cup in Morocco, Solís was part of the Mexican team that achieved third place in the tournament.

== Honours ==
Mexico U17

- FIFA U-17 Women's World Cup third place: 2025
