= Honduras women's national under-17 football team =

Honduras
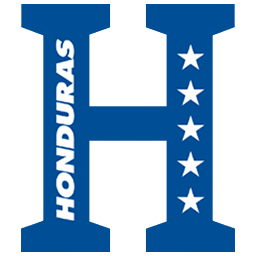
- Association: FENAFUTH
- Confederation: CONCACAF (North America)
- FIFA code: HON
First colours	Second colours

First international
- Honduras 9–1 Belize; 11 November 2015 (Comayagua, Honduras)

Biggest win
- Honduras 9–1 Belize; 11 November 2015 (Comayagua, Honduras)

Biggest defeat
- Honduras 0–6 Costa Rica; 15 November 2015 (Comayagua, Honduras)

The Honduras women's national under-17 football team is the national women's u-17 football team of Honduras and is overseen by the Football Federation of Honduras. The team is allowed to participate at the different UNCAF and CONCACAF women's tournaments; as well to the FIFA U-17 Women's World Cup, although they haven't been able to qualify as of yet.

== Competitive record ==
FIFA U-17 Women's World Cup
Year	Record	Goals	Finish
(New Zealand) 2008 ↓ (Costa Rica) 2014	Didn't enter		
(Jordan) 2016 ↓ (Dominican Republic) 2024	Didn't qualify		
(Morocco) 2025	Didn't qualify		
(Morocco) 2026	Didn't qualify		
CONCACAF Women's U-17 Championship
(Trinidad and Tobago) 2008 ↓ (Jamaica) 2013	Didn't enter		
(Grenada) 2016	1–0–1	9:6	Qualifying tournament
(Nicaragua) 2018	0–0–3	0:10	Qualifying tournament
(Dominican Republic) 2022	3–0–1	26:4	Round of 16
(Mexico) 2024	1–1–1	7:3	Qualifying tournament

== Head to head ==
- As of 28 October 2017

Opponent	Record	Goals
Belize	1–0–0	9:1
Costa Rica	0–0–2	0:10
El Salvador	0–0–1	0:1
Panama	0–0–1	0:5
Totals	1–0–4	9:17

== See also ==
- Football in Honduras
