= Anguilla women's national under-17 football team =

Anguilla
- Association: Anguilla Football Association
- Confederation: CONCACAF (North America)
- FIFA code: AIA
First colours	Second colours

Anguilla women's national under-17 football team is the national football team of Anguilla for women under 17.

== Under 17 ==
Anguilla women's national under-17 football team competed in the CONCACAF Under 17 Women’s Qualifying Tournament 2007/08. In the group stage, they were in Group C which played its games in Puerto Rico. In the 14 November 2007 match against Puerto Rico, they lost 0–7. In the 16 November game, they lost 1–2 to Bermuda. Overall, they finished last in their group with two losses, allowing nine goals while only scoring one.

== Background and development ==
Football is the most popular women's sport in the country. In 2006, there were 100 registered football players in the country. This was an increase from 0 registered players in 2002, 20 in 2003, 50 in 2004, and 65 in 2005. In 2006, there were 12 total football teams in the country, five of which were for women only. There is a women's league with support from the national federation which plays from April to June. Anguilla Football Association was founded in 1990 and became affiliated with FIFA in 1996. Women's football is required to be represented by specific mandate in the federation's committee. In 2011 in Germany at the 2011 FIFA Women's Football Symposium, Anguilla Football Association spoke about the best practices for developing the women's game.
