= Alyssa Chin =

Caymanian former footballer (born 1994)

Personal information
- Date of birth: 7 October 1994 (age 32)
- Place of birth: Cayman Islands
- Position: Midfielder

International career
Years	Team	Apps	(Gls)
2009–2010	Cayman Islands U17	8	(1)
2007	Cayman Islands	1	(0)

Alyssa Chin (born 7 October 1994) is a Caymanian former association football player who holds the record as the youngest player in a women's international match. She made her debut for the Cayman Islands national team aged 13 years and 17 days.

== International career ==
=== Youth ===
Chin made eight appearances for Cayman Islands U17 between 2009 and 2010, and she scored on her final match for the team, which was a 1–0 victory against Haiti U17. She was injured for most of 2011 and returned after a period of eight months in November 2011. She did not play again for Cayman Islands U17.

=== Senior ===
On 24 October 2007, Chin aged 13 years and 17 days, debuted with the Cayman Islands national team in a 0–4 defeat against Puerto Rico.
