= Zoé Sánchez =

Mexican association footballer (b. 2009)

Personal information
- Full name: Dafne Zoé Sánchez Íñiguez
- Date of birth: 17 June 2009 (age 17)
- Place of birth: Tlalnepantla, State of Mexico, Mexico
- Height: 1.60 m (5 ft 3 in)
- Position: Midfielder

Team information
- Current team: Monterrey

Youth career
- 2023–: Monterrey

International career^{‡}
Years	Team	Apps	(Gls)
2024–	Mexico U17		
Medal record
Women's football
Representing Mexico
FIFA U-17 Women's World Cup
Third place	2025 Morocco
CONCACAF Women's U-17 Championship
Runner-up	2024 Mexico
- ‡ National team caps and goals as of 9 November 2025

Dafne Zoé Sánchez Íñiguez (born 17 June 2009) is a Mexican professional footballer who plays as a midfielder for Liga MX Femenil club Monterrey.

== Youth career ==
In 2024, she joined the Mexico women's national under-17 team that secured second place at the 2024 CONCACAF Women's U-17 Championship and third place at the 2025 FIFA U-17 Women's World Cup in Morocco.

== Honours ==
Mexico U17

- FIFA U-17 Women's World Cup third place: 2025
- CONCACAF Women's U-17 Championship runner-up: 2024
