= El Salvador women's national under-17 football team =

El Salvador women's U17
- Nickname: La Azulita
- Association: Federación Salvadoreña de Fútbol
- Confederation: CONCACAF (North America)
- Head coach: Debbie Gómez
- FIFA code: SLV
First colours	Second colours

CONCACAF Women's U-17 Championship
- Appearances: 4 (first in 2008)

The El Salvador women's Under 17's football team, is controlled by Federación Salvadoreña de Fútbol and represents El Salvador in international women's Under 17 or youth football competitions.

== Results and fixtures ==
=== 2026 ===
24 January 2026 2026 CONCACAF U-17 Women's World Cup qualification – Final round	El Salvador	v	Trinidad and Tobago
14:00 UTC−5	TBD 13'	[]	TBD 61'

26 January 2026 2026 CONCACAF U-17 Women's World Cup qualification – Final round	El Salvador	v	Curaçao
14:00 UTC−5	TBD 13'	[]	TBD 61'

30 January 2026 2026 CONCACAF U-17 Women's World Cup qualification – Final round	El Salvador	v	Barbados
14:00 UTC−5	TBD 13'	[]	TBD 61'

2 February 2026 2026 CONCACAF U-17 Women's World Cup qualification – Final round	El Salvador	v	Guadeloupe
14:00 UTC−5	TBD 13'	[]	TBD 61'

== Players ==
=== Current squad ===
- The following players were named to the squad to play in the 2026 CONCACAF U-17 Women's World Cup qualification from 17 to 22 March 2026.

No.	Pos.	Player	Date of birth (age)	Caps	Goals	Club
21	GK	Erikka Flores	27 October 2010 (age 15)			(Salvadoran Football Federation) Free agent
1	GK	Hazel Silva	15 May 2009 (age 17)			(Salvadoran Football Federation) Alianza Women
18	GK	Kimberly Elías	21 March 2010 (age 16)			(Salvadoran Football Federation) Alianza Women
2	DF	Eva Chicas	5 January 2009 (age 17)			(United States Soccer Federation) Fram GA
20	DF	Rosa Luarca	23 September 2010 (age 16)			(Salvadoran Football Federation) Free agent
4	DF	Melanie Menjívar	10 August 2010 (age 16)			(Salvadoran Football Federation) Alianza Women
17	DF	Emma Torres	20 October 2009 (age 17)			(United States Soccer Federation) Bethesda SC
5	DF	Zoe Castro	10 August 2009 (age 17)			(United States Soccer Federation) So Cal Blues SC
6	DF	Jade Díaz	5 May 2009 (age 17)			(United States Soccer Federation) Rockford Raptors
13	MF	Maya Buerger	20 November 2009 (age 16)			(United States Soccer Federation) Fort Lauderdale United
10	MF	Valentina Alvarenga	4 February 2010 (age 16)			(Salvadoran Football Federation) Inter FA
15	MF	Jacqueline Quintanilla	18 June 2009 (age 17)			(United States Soccer Federation) AHFC Royals
11	MF	Kaylen Álvarez	22 February 2009 (age 17)			(United States Soccer Federation) HTX Soccer
7	MF	Shirley Rivera	22 March 2010 (age 16)			(United States Soccer Federation) Match Fit Surf
8	MF	Cristina Quintanilla	1 May 2009 (age 17)			(United States Soccer Federation) Legends FC
12	MF	Jade Delcollo	4 May 2009 (age 17)			(United States Soccer Federation) Penn Fusion
9	FW	Arianna Jones	14 July 2010 (age 16)			(United States Soccer Federation) Springfield YSC
19	FW	Abigail Salgado	27 January 2009 (age 17)			(United States Soccer Federation) Internacional SC
16	FW	Kylie Guardado	1 September 2009 (age 17)			(United States Soccer Federation) NC Fusion
14	FW	Georgina Herrera	28 January 2010 (age 16)			(United States Soccer Federation) IMG Academy

== CONCACAF Women's U-17 Championship ==
Year	Result	Matches	Wins	Draws	Losses	GF	GA
(Trinidad and Tobago) 2008	Group stage	3	0	0	3	2	24
(Costa Rica) 2010	Did not qualify						
(Guatemala) 2012	Did not qualify						
(Jamaica) 2013	Group stage	3	1	0	2	1	9
(Grenada) 2016	Did not qualify						
(Nicaragua) (United States) 2018	Did not qualify						
(Dominican Republic) 2022	Quarter-finals	5	4	0	1	21	2
(Mexico) 2024	Group stage	3	0	1	2	5	10
(Mexico) (Nicaragua) (Trinidad and Tobago) 2025	Group stage	3	1	1	1	5	8
(Costa Rica) 2026	Group stage	3	1	1	1	3	9
Total	5/10	20	7	3	10	39	62

== Coaching staff ==
=== Current coaching staff ===
As of January 6, 2026

Position	Name	Nationality
Manager	Debbie Gomez	El Salvador
Assistant manager	Ingrid Ramos	El Salvador
Goalkeeper coach	Fidel Mondragon	El Salvador
Strength/Conditioning Coach	Edgar Escobar	El Salvador

== Coaches ==
- Julio Cesar Ramos (2007-2008)
- Marcial Turcios (2008-2009)
- Ricardo Herrera (2009-)
- (El Salvador) Ernesto Góchez (2013-)
- (El Salvador) Ricardo Herrera (2017)
- (El Salvador) Eric Acuna (2020-2025)
- (Colombia) Hugo Escobar (2025) (Note: Acuña was suspended in April to August 2025. Escobar replaced Acuña for the match against the United States.)
- (El Salvador) Debbie Gómez (2025-Present)

== FIFA U-17 Women's World Cup Record ==
Year	Result	Matches	Wins	Draws	Losses	G7	GA
(New Zealand) 2008	Did not qualify						
(Trinidad and Tobago) 2010	Did not qualify						
(Azerbaijan) 2012	Did not qualify						
(Costa Rica) 2014	Did not qualify						
(Jordan) 2016	Did not qualify						
(Uruguay) 2018	Did not qualify						
(India) 2022	Did not qualify						
(Dominican Republic) 2024	Did not qualify						
(Morocco) 2025	Did not qualify						
(Morocco) 2026	Did not qualify						
(Morocco) 2027	To be determined						
(Morocco) 2028	To be determined						
(Morocco) 2029	To be determined						
Total	0/9	0	0	0	0	0	0

== All-time record against other nations ==
As of June 3, 2013

Team	GP	W	D	L	GF	GA	Pts
Nicaragua	3	2	0	1	11	3	6
Costa Rica	3	0	1	2	3	10	1
Panama	1	0	0	1	1	3	0
Guatemala	2	2	0	0	5	1	6
Trinidad and Tobago	1	0	0	1	1	5	0
United States	1	0	0	1	0	9	0

== See also ==
- El Salvador women's national football team
- Federación Salvadoreña de Fútbol
