= Dominican Republic women's national under-17 football team =

National women's youth soccer team from the Dominican Republic

Dominican Republic U-17
- Nickname: Las Quisqueyanas (The Quisqueyanas)
- Association: Dominican Football Federation
- Confederation: CONCACAF (North America, Central America and the Caribbean)
- Sub-confederation: CFU (Caribbean)
- Head coach: Betzaida Ubri
- FIFA code: DOM
First colours	Second colours

FIFA U-17 Women's World Cup
- Appearances: 1 (first in 2024)
- Best result: Group stage (2024)

CONCACAF Women's U-17 Championship
- Appearances: 1 (first in 2022)
- Best result: Quarter-finals (2022)

The Dominican Republic women's national under-17 football team represents the Dominican Republic in international youth football competitions.

== FIFA U-17 Women's World Cup ==
The team participated for the first time in 2024 as host.

Year	Result	Matches	Wins	Draws*	Losses	GF	GA
(New Zealand) 2008	Did not qualify						
(Trinidad and Tobago) 2010	Did not qualify						
(Azerbaijan) 2012	Did not qualify						
(Costa Rica) 2014	Did not qualify						
(Jordan) 2016	Did not qualify						
(Uruguay) 2018	Did not qualify						
(India) 2022	Did not qualify						
(Dominican Republic) 2024	Group stage	3	0	1	2	1	4
(Morocco) 2025	Did not qualify						
(Morocco) 2026	Did not qualify						
Total	1/10	3	0	1	2	1	4

== CONCACAF Women's U-17 Championship ==
Year	Result	Matches	Wins	Draws	Losses	GF	GA
(Trinidad and Tobago) 2008	Did not qualify						
(Costa Rica) 2010	Did not qualify						
(Guatemala) 2012	Did not qualify						
(Jamaica) 2013	Did not qualify						
(Grenada) 2016	Did not qualify						
(United States) 2018	Did not qualify						
(Dominican Republic) 2022	Quarter-finals	4	1	0	3	8	23
(Mexico) 2024	Did not enter, qualified automatically to 2024 FIFA U-17 Women's World Cup by hosting.						
Total	1/8	4	1	0	3	8	23

== See also ==
- Dominican Republic women's national football team
- FIFA U-17 Women's World Cup
- UEFA Women's Under-17 Championship

== Head-to-head record ==
The following table shows Dominican Republic's head-to-head record in the FIFA U-17 Women's World Cup.

Opponent	Pld	W	D	L	GF	GA	GD	Win %
Ecuador	1	0	0	1	0	2	−2	0.00
New Zealand	1	0	1	0	1	1	+0	0.00
Nigeria	1	0	0	1	0	1	−1	0.00
Total	3	0	1	2	1	4	−3	0.00
