= Courtney Verloo =

American soccer player

Personal information
- Full name: Courtney Reneé Verloo
- Date of birth: May 9, 1991 (age 35)
- Place of birth: Tualatin, Oregon, United States
- Height: 5 ft 9 in (1.75 m)
- Position: Forward

Youth career
- 2006–09: Tualatin High School

College career
| Years | Team | Apps | (Gls) |
| 2009–2013 | Stanford Cardinal | 73 | (14) |

Senior career*
| Years | Team | Apps | (Gls) |
| 2014 | Western New York Flash | 1 | (0) |

International career
| 2008 | United States U17 | | |
| 2009–2010 | United States U20 | | |
| 2012 | United States U23 | | |
- * Club domestic league appearances and goals as of December 23, 2014

Courtney Reneé Verloo (born May 9, 1991) is an American soccer player from Tualatin, Oregon. A forward, she played college soccer for Stanford University and professionally for the Western New York Flash in the National Women's Soccer League (NWSL). She was also a member of the U-17, U-20, and U-23 United States women's national soccer teams.

== Early life ==
Courtney Reneé Verloo was born on May 9, 1991, to Laurel and Steve Verloo. She grew up in Tualatin, Oregon, in the Portland metropolitan area, with sisters Anna and Brittany.

Verloo played soccer at Tualatin High School where she graduated in 2009. In high school, she was selected as player of the year in both 2006 and 2007 by Gatorade and in 2009 was a high school all-American selection by Parade magazine. During high school, she also played for FC Portland and the United States National team's U-17 squad.

Verloo then attended Stanford University where she majored in human biology and minored in psychology. At Stanford she played in 95 games, starting 77 of them, and scored 23 goals and collected 25 assists. Her team won the Pac-12 Championship in 2009, 2010, and 2011, and the NCAA National Championship in 2011. She also spent time with the national team (U-20) while in college.

== Professional career ==
In January 2014, she was drafted ninth overall by the Western New York Flash in the National Women's Soccer League draft. Verloo signed a two-year contract with the club in March 2014 and made her debut on May 7, 2014, against FC Kansas City. She was waived on May 31, 2014.
