= Haiti women's national under-17 football team =

Women's football team

Haiti
- Nickname(s): Les Grenadières; Le Rouge et Bleu; Les Bicolores; La Sélection Nationale
- Association: Fédération Haïtienne de Football (FHF)
- Confederation: CONCACAF (North America)
- Sub-confederation: CFU (Caribbean)
- Home stadium: Stade Sylvio Cator
- FIFA code: HAI
First colours	Second colours

Biggest win
- Haiti 22–0 U.S. Virgin Islands (Port-au-Prince, Haiti; July 19, 2017)

The Haiti women's national under-17 football team represents Haiti in international football for women at this age level and is controlled by the Fédération Haïtienne de Football (FHF).

== History ==
The team faced a number of challenges. The 2010 earthquake was a major one, with the management wondering if the team would be able to compete internationally, as a result of a range of issues including many players dealing with bereavement and the death of their parents. There was also fear by the national federation that any offers to train overseas would lead to players leaving the squad to live in the host country.

== Competitions ==
The team won 19–0 against French Guiana in a 2013 qualifying match for the FIFA Women's U-17 World Cup. In the lead up to that competition, the team played a warmup match against a team of Haitian referees in honor of International Women's Day. They played a friendly against the Haitian women's national under-15 team in 2014, winning 2 – 1.

The team participated in the 2017 USA Cup in July. Their participation was facilitated by a grant from the United States government. The team was using the competition as an opportunity to train ahead of the start of regional World Cup qualification scheduled to get underway in October 2017. They came away from the competition victorious, winning seven games in a row. Their final game was against a side from St. Paul, Minnesota with Bethina, Sheelove, Tabita, Nancy, and Madelina each contributing goals in their 6–2 win.

== Roster ==
Player	Active	Position	ref
Mathurin Ruthny	2017	Defender	
Jean Baptiste Dieunica	2017	Midfielder	
Louis Abaina	2017	Forward	
Melchie Dumonay	2017	Forward	

== Competitive record ==
=== FIFA U-17 Women's World Cup ===
Year	Result	Position	Pld	W	D*	L	GF	GA
(New Zealand) 2008	Did not qualify							
(Trinidad and Tobago) 2010	Did not qualify							
(Azerbaijan) 2012	Did not qualify							
(Costa Rica) 2014	Did not qualify							
(Jordan) 2016	Did not qualify							
(Uruguay) 2018	Did not qualify							
(India) 2022	Did not qualify							
(Dominican Republic) 2024	Did not qualify							
(Morocco) 2025	Did not qualify							
(Morocco) 2026	To be determined							
Total	0/10							

=== CONCACAF Women's U-17 Championship ===
Year	Result	Pld	W	D*	L	GF	GA
(Trinidad and Tobago) 2008	Did not qualify						
(Costa Rica) 2010	Group stage	3	0	0	3	0	12
(Guatemala) 2012	Did not enter						
(Jamaica) 2013	Group stage	3	0	1	2	1	5
(Grenada) 2016	Fourth place	4	3	0	1	18	6
(United States) 2018	Fourth place	4	2	1	1	9	5
(Mexico) 2020	Qualified; cancelled						
(Dominican Republic) 2022	Round of 16	4	2	0	2	5	5
(Mexico) 2024	Fourth place	5	2	0	3	9	19
(Mexico) (Nicaragua) (Trinidad and Tobago) 2025	Group Stage	3	1	1	1	3	9
(Costa Rica) 2026	Did not qualify						
Total	7/10	26	10	3	13	45	61

=== Awards ===
- FIFA Fair Play Award: 2010

== See also ==
- Haiti women's national football team
- Haiti women's national under-20 football team
