= Trinidad and Tobago women's national under-17 football team =

Trinidad and Tobago U-17
- Nickname: Women Soca Warriors
- Association: Trinidad and Tobago Football Association
- Confederation: CONCACAF (North America, Central America and the Caribbean)
- Sub-confederation: CFU (Caribbean)
- FIFA code: TRI
First colours	Second colours

FIFA U-17 Women's World Cup
- Appearances: 1 (first in 2010)
- Best result: Group stage, 2010

CONCACAF Women's U-17 Championship
- Appearances: 4 (first in 2008)
- Best result: Group stage

The Trinidad and Tobago women's national under-17 football team represents Trinidad and Tobago in international youth football competitions.

== Recent history ==
In January 2026, the Trinidad and Tobago women's national under-17 team assembled for a centralized training camp as part of preparations for upcoming regional competition. The camp was affected by accommodation issues following a scheduling mix-up, which required players to commute from home while maintaining the planned training schedule.

== Players mentioned in January 2026 camp ==
The following players were named in media coverage of the Trinidad and Tobago women's national under-17 team's January 2026 training camp.

Pos.	Player	Club
GK	Saiya Smith	DPSFC (United States)
GK	Alexia Dolland	Pro Series
GK	Zofia Richards	Pro Series
DF	Hackeemar Goodridge	Trendsetter Hawks
DF	Alia Toussaint	Petersfield United
DF	Mateja Leben	Pro Series
DF	Jessica Nesbitt	Pro Series
DF	Gyasi Lewis	Combined Ballerz
DF	Layla Gregoire	Downtown United SC (United States)
MF	Gianna Changar	United Futbol Academy (United States)
MF	Chelsea John	Pickering FC (Canada)
MF	Rori Gittens	Club Sando
MF	Jade Jones	FC Stars Blue National Team (United States)
MF	Zyesha Potts	Jewels SC
MF	Khloe Kirton	Pro Series
FW	Giuliana Meyer	Philadelphia Ukrainian Nationals (United States)
FW	Shiyah Matthews	LA Surf (United States)
FW	Sydney Pollard	Pro Series
FW	Tori Jean-Jacques	Pickering FC (Canada)
FW	Shemaiah Toussaint	Cox Football Academy
FW	Sanni Wilson	Florida United (United States)

== FIFA U-17 Women's World Cup ==
The team qualified for the first time in 2010 as host.

Year	Result	Matches	Wins	Draws*	Losses	GF	GA
(New Zealand) 2008	Did not qualify						
(Trinidad and Tobago) 2010	Group stage	3	1	0	2	3	4
(Azerbaijan) 2012	Did not qualify						
(Costa Rica) 2014	Did not qualify						
(Jordan) 2016	Did not qualify						
(Uruguay) 2018	Did not qualify						
(India) 2022	Did not qualify						
(Dominican Republic) 2024	Did not qualify						
(Morocco) 2025	Did not qualify						
(Morocco) 2026	Did not qualify						
Total	1/10	3	1	0	2	3	4

== CONCACAF Women's U-17 Championship ==
Year	Result	Matches	Wins	Draws	Losses	GF	GA
(Trinidad and Tobago) 2008	Group stage	3	1	1	1	6	10
(Costa Rica) 2010	Did not qualify						
(Guatemala) 2012	Group stage	3	0	1	2	0	7
(Jamaica) 2013	Group stage	3	0	0	3	0	26
(Grenada) 2016	Did not qualify						
(United States) 2018	Did not qualify						
(Dominican Republic) 2022	Group stage	3	0	0	3	1	19
(Mexico) 2024	Did not qualify						
Total	4/8	12	1	2	9	7	62

=== Previous squads ===
2010 FIFA U-17 Women's World Cup

== See also ==
- Trinidad and Tobago women's national football team
- FIFA U-17 Women's World Cup
- UEFA Women's Under-17 Championship
