= 2010 CONCACAF Women's U-17 Championship =

2nd edition in the history of CONCACAF

2010 CONCACAF Under-17 Women's Championship
Costa Rica 2010
- 2010 CONCACAF Women's U-17 Championship official logo

Tournament details
- Host country: Costa Rica
- Dates: 10–20 March
- Teams: 8 (from 1 confederation)
- Venue: 1 (in 1 host city)

Final positions
- Champions: Canada (1st title)
- Runners-up: Mexico
- Third place: United States
- Fourth place: Costa Rica

Tournament statistics
- Matches played: 16
- Goals scored: 73 (4.56 per match)
- Top scorer(s): (United States) Lindsey Horan (8 goals)

The 2010 CONCACAF Under-17 Women's Championship was held in Costa Rica from March 10–20, 2010. This was the second edition of the U-17 women's championship for CONCACAF. The first and second placed teams qualified for the 2010 FIFA U-17 Women's World Cup held in Trinidad and Tobago. The United States were the defending champions from 2008. Trinidad and Tobago did not participate because they automatically qualified to the World Cup as hosts.

== Media coverage ==
Like the 2010 CONCACAF Under-20 Women's Championship held in January, Concacaf.tv broadcast each game in live stream free of charge. Fox Soccer Channel and Fox Sports en Espanol broadcast group games that involved Mexico or the United States as well as all knockout stage matches regardless of participants.

== Qualified teams ==
Region	Method of qualification	Teams
Caribbean; Caribbean Football Union (CFU)	2009 Caribbean Football Union; Women's Under-17 Tournament	Cayman Islands; Haiti; Jamaica
Central America; Central American Football Union (UNCAF)	2009 UNCAF Women's; Under-17 Tournament	Panama
North America; North American Football Union (NAFU)	Automatic qualification	Canada; Mexico; United States
Host nation		Costa Rica

== Group stage ==
All times are local (UTC−06:00).

Key to colors in group tables
Advanced to Semi-finals

=== Group A ===
Team	Pld	W	D	L	GF	GA	GD	Pts
Mexico	3	3	0	0	10	0	+10	9
Canada	3	2	0	1	6	3	+3	6
Jamaica	3	1	0	2	3	7	−4	3
Panama	3	0	0	3	1	10	−9	0

10 March 2010
18:00

Panama	0–6	Mexico
	Report	Samarzich 13', 57'; González 16', 90'; Sánchez 50'; Piña 84'

Estadio Alejandro Morera Soto, Alajuela
Attendance: 251
Referee: Shane de Silva (Trinidad and Tobago)
10 March 2010
20:30

Jamaica	1–4	Canada
Williams 76'	Report	Davis 8'; Ghoneim 44', 63'; Hémond 88'

Estadio Alejandro Morera Soto, Alajuela
Attendance: 251
Referee: Erika Vargas (Costa Rica)

12 March 2010
13:00

Mexico	3–0	Jamaica
Salcedo 66'; Lara 71'; González 75'	Report

Estadio Alejandro Morera Soto, Alajuela
Attendance: 381
Referee: Arlene Troya (Panama)
12 March 2010
15:30

Panama	1–2	Canada
Alveo 88'	Report	Cantave 8'; Simpson 37'

Estadio Alejandro Morera Soto, Alajuela
Attendance: 381
Referee: Irazema Aguilera (Cuba)

14 March 2010
18:00

Jamaica	2–0	Panama
Bailey 27'; Carter 74'	Report

Estadio Alejandro Morera Soto, Alajuela
Attendance: 320
Referee: Margaret Domka (USA)
14 March 2010
20:30

Canada	0–1	Mexico
	Report	Llamas 42'

Estadio Alejandro Morera Soto, Alajuela
Attendance: 320
Referee: Erika Vargas (Costa Rica)

=== Group B ===
Team	Pld	W	D	L	GF	GA	GD	Pts
United States	3	3	0	0	32	0	+32	9
Costa Rica	3	2	0	1	9	10	−1	6
Cayman Islands	3	1	0	2	1	20	−19	3
Haiti	3	0	0	3	0	12	−12	0

11 March 2010
18:00

Haiti	0–9	United States
	Report	Doll 2'; Smith 13', 30'; Roccaro 16'; Brian 52'; Horan 66', 71', 88', 90'

Estadio Alejandro Morera Soto, Alajuela
Attendance: 751
Referee: Dianne Ferreira-James (Guyana)
11 March 2010
20:30

Costa Rica	7–0	Cayman Islands
Rodríguez 8', 52', 58'; Moreira 37', 59'; Villalta 54'; Sánchez 84'	Report

Estadio Alejandro Morera Soto, Alajuela
Attendance: 751
Referee: Michelle Pye (Canada)

13 March 2010
18:00

United States	13–0	Cayman Islands
Horan 2', 39'; Brian 15', 22', 27'; Torres 17'; Solaun 34', 49', 59'; Clark 38'; Farrell 47', 61'; Smith 73'	Report

Estadio Alejandro Morera Soto, Alajuela
Attendance: 800
Referee: Lucila Venegas (Mexico)
13 March 2010
20:30

Costa Rica	2–0	Haiti
Villalta 57'; Moreira 74'	Report

Estadio Alejandro Morera Soto, Alajuela
Attendance: 800
Referee: Cardella Samuels (Jamaica)

15 March 2010
18:00

Cayman Islands	1–0	Haiti
Chin 89'	Report

Estadio Alejandro Morera Soto, Alajuela
Attendance: 1,700
Referee: Cardella Samuels (Jamaica)
15 March 2010
20:30

Costa Rica	0–10	United States
	Report	Smith 10', 14', 54'; Doll 17'; Brian 27', 84'; Horan 44', 68'; Torres 66'; Gonzalez 78'

Estadio Alejandro Morera Soto, Alajuela
Attendance: 1,700
Referee: Lucila Venegas (Mexico)

== Knockout stage ==
All times are local (UTC−06:00).

The winners of the two semifinal matches qualified for the 2010 FIFA U-17 Women's World Cup held in Trinidad and Tobago.

Semi-finals
18 March – Alajuela
Mexico (a.e.t.)	3
Costa Rica	1
18 March – Alajuela
United States	0 (3)
Canada (p)	0 (5)

Final
20 March – Alajuela
Mexico	0
Canada	1
Third place
20 March – Alajuela
Costa Rica	0
United States	6

=== Semi-finals ===
18 March 2010
21:00

Mexico	3–1 (a.e.t.)	Costa Rica
Lara 70'; Murillo 106'; Samarzich 111'	Report	Fallas 85'

Estadio Alejandro Morera Soto, Alajuela
Attendance: 750
Referee: Dianne Ferreira-James (Guyana)

18 March 2010
18:00

United States	0–0 (a.e.t.)	Canada
	Report
Penalties
Brian (penalty scored); Dahlkemper (penalty scored); Wedemeyer (penalty missed); Solaun (penalty scored)	3–5	(penalty scored) Clarke; (penalty scored) Simpson; (penalty scored) Ongtengco; (penalty scored) Setturlund; (penalty scored) Campbell

Estadio Alejandro Morera Soto, Alajuela
Attendance: 750
Referee: Shane de Silva (Trinidad and Tobago)

=== Third place play-off ===
20 March 2010
18:00

Costa Rica	0–6	United States
	Report	Clark 5'; Torres 37'; Brannon 40'; Horan 55'; Farrell 66'; Smith 81'

Estadio Alejandro Morera Soto, Alajuela
Attendance: 259
Referee: Lucila Venegas (Mexico)

=== Final ===
20 March 2010
21:00

Mexico	0–1	Canada
	Report	McNicoll 8'

Estadio Alejandro Morera Soto, Alajuela
Attendance: 259
Referee: Irazema Aguilera (Cuba)

== Winners ==
2010 CONCACAF Women's U-17 Championship

Canada
First title

== Goalscorers ==
USA's Horan won the top-scorer award with 8 goals.

8 goals

- (United States) Lindsey Horan

6 goals

- (United States) Morgan Brian
- (United States) Taylor Smith

3 goals

- (Costa Rica) Raquel Rodríguez
- (Costa Rica) Maria Moreira
- (Mexico) Diana González
- (Mexico) Tanya Samarzich
- (United States) Isabel Farrell
- (United States) Havana Solaun (Note: She switched her international allegiance to Jamaica in 2019.)
- (United States) Kaili Torres

2 goals

- (Canada) Nour Ghoneim
- (Costa Rica) Alhyssa Villalta
- (Mexico) Lucero Luna
- (United States) Kaysie Clark
- (United States) Alexandra Doll

1 goal

- (Canada) Haisha Cantave
- (Canada) Kylie Davis
- (Canada) Sabrina Hémond
- (Canada) Kinley McNicoll
- (Canada) Diamond Simpson
- (Cayman Islands) Alyssa Chin
- (Costa Rica) Angélica Fallas
- (Costa Rica) Fabiola Sánchez
- (Jamaica) Shantel Bailey
- (Jamaica) Trudi Carter
- (Jamaica) Shenika Williams
- (Mexico) Anakaren Llamas
- (Mexico) Christina Murillo
- (Mexico) Fernanda Piña
- (Mexico) Daniela Alejandra Salcedo
- (Mexico) Andrea Sánchez
- (Panama) Lindsay Alveo
- (United States) Olivia Brannon
- (United States) Jennifer Gonzalez
- (United States) Cari Roccaro
