= Mexico women's national under-17 football team =

Selected team of Mexican football players under 17 years

Mexico Women's U-17
- Nickname(s): El Tri (The Tri); El Tricolor (The Tricolor)
- Association: Mexican Football Federation (Federación Mexicana de Fútbol)
- Confederation: CONCACAF (North America)
- Head coach: Miguel Gamero
- FIFA code: MEX
First colours	Second colours

First international
- Mexico 6–0 Jamaica (Macoya, Trinidad and Tobago; 16 July 2008)

Biggest win
- Mexico 15–0 Guyana (Santo Domingo, Dominican Republic; 30 April 2022)

Biggest defeat
- Germany 9–0 Mexico (Scarborough, Trinidad and Tobago; 05 September 2010); Japan 9–0 Mexico (Baku, Azerbaijan; 30 September 2012)

CONCACAF Women's U-17 Championship
- Appearances: 8 (first in 2008)
- Best result: Champions (2013)

FIFA U-17 Women's World Cup
- Appearances: 9 (first in 2010)
- Best result: Runners-up (2018)

The Mexico U-17 women's national football team is the national women's under-17 football team of Mexico and is managed by the Mexican Football Federation. Miguel Gamero was named head coach on January, 2025.

Under Mónica Vergara, the team reached the final at the 2018 FIFA U-17 Women's World Cup in Uruguay. Although they fell 2–1 to Spain, their silver medal is the best showing for any Mexico squad at a FIFA Women's World Cup. The team also won the 2013 CONCACAF Women's U-17 Championship.

Most members of the current squad play in the Liga MX Femenil per the league's 1000-minute requirement for young players.

== Results and fixtures ==
Legend

Win Draw Lose Fixture

=== 2025 ===
24 October 2025 FIFA U-17 Women's World Cup	Mexico	1–0	Cameroon	Salé, Morocco

== Players ==
=== Current squad ===
The following 21 players were named to the squad for the 2026 FIFA U-17 Women's World Cup.

No.	Pos.	Player	Date of birth (age)	Club
1	GK	Ania López	29 January 2010 (aged 16)	(United States Soccer Federation) Match Fit Surf
2	DF	Fernanda Monroy	31 March 2009 (aged 17)	(Mexican Football Federation) Toluca
3	DF	Emily Delgado	27 November 2009 (aged 16)	(Mexican Football Federation) Atlas
4	DF	Valeria Figueroa	25 September 2009 (aged 17)	(Mexican Football Federation) Tigres UANL
5	DF	Camila Campos	10 March 2009 (aged 17)	(United States Soccer Federation) Seacoast United
6	MF	Ixchel Uscanga	26 January 2009 (aged 17)	(Mexican Football Federation) Guadalajara
7	FW	Natalia Pérez	19 March 2010 (aged 16)	(Mexican Football Federation) Guadalajara
8	MF	Zoé Sánchez	17 June 2009 (aged 17)	(Mexican Football Federation) Monterrey
9	FW	Mia Urbano	3 March 2009 (aged 17)	(Mexican Football Federation) Guadalajara
10	MF	Citlalli Reyes	6 July 2009 (aged 17)	(United States Soccer Federation) Las Vegas Lights
11	FW	Kemberly García	23 July 2010 (aged 16)	(Mexican Football Federation) Club América
12	GK	Emiley Ríos	18 March 2009 (aged 17)	(Mexican Football Federation) Club Tijuana
13	DF	Vanessa Paredes	2 July 2009 (aged 17)	(Mexican Football Federation) Club América
14	DF	Bethzabeth Barrón	20 February 2010 (aged 16)	(Mexican Football Federation) Guadalajara
15	DF	Araceli Pérez	24 August 2009 (aged 17)	(Mexican Football Federation) Pachuca
16	FW	Shaddai Núñez	8 January 2010 (aged 16)	(Mexican Football Federation) Toluca
17	DF	Bianka Arredondo	10 February 2010 (aged 16)	(Mexican Football Federation) Pachuca
18	MF	Naomi Rojo	17 June 2009 (aged 17)	(Mexican Football Federation) Club Tijuana
19	FW	Nicole Jiménez	21 January 2010 (aged 16)	(French Football Federation) Marseille
20	FW	Natalia Ugalde	24 September 2010 (aged 16)	(Mexican Football Federation) Pumas UNAM
21	GK	Camila Haro	24 February 2009 (aged 17)	(United States Soccer Federation) Legends FC

== Honours ==
- FIFA U-17 Women's World Cup
  - (silver) Runners-up: 2018
  - (bronze) Third place: 2025
- CONCACAF Women's U-17 Championship
  - (gold) Champions: 2013
  - (silver) Runners-up (5) : 2010, 2016, 2018, 2022, 2024
  - (bronze) Third place: 2012

== Competitive record ==
=== FIFA U-17 Women's World Cup ===
Year	Result	Pld	W	D*	L	GF	GA	Squad
(New Zealand) 2008	Did not qualify							
(Trinidad and Tobago) 2010	Group stage	3	1	0	2	5	13	Squad
(Azerbaijan) 2012	Group stage	3	1	0	2	1	10	Squad
(Costa Rica) 2014	Quarter-finals	4	2	0	2	8	5	Squad
(Jordan) 2016	Quarter-finals	4	2	1	1	11	4	Squad
(Uruguay) 2018	Runners-up	6	2	3	1	6	5	Squad
(India) 2022	Group stage	3	1	0	2	4	5	Squad
(Dominican Republic) 2024	Group stage	3	0	0	3	4	10	Squad
(Morocco) 2025	Third place	7	3	2	2	4	4	Squad
(Morocco) 2026	Round of 16	4	2	0	2	5	5	Squad
(Morocco) 2027	To be determined							
(Morocco) 2028	To be determined							
(Morocco) 2029	To be determined							
Total	9/13	37	14	6	17	48	61	–

* Draws include knockout matches decided by penalty shoot-out.

=== CONCACAF Women's U-17 Championship ===
Year	Round	Position	MP	W	D*	L	GF	GA
(Trinidad and Tobago) 2008	Fourth place	4th	4	2	0	2	11	5
(Costa Rica) 2010	Runners-up	2nd	5	4	0	1	13	2
(Guatemala) 2012	Third place	3rd	5	3	0	2	14	4
(Jamaica) 2013	Champions	1st	5	1	4	0	10	3
(Grenada) 2016	Runners-up	2nd	5	3	0	2	8	5
(Nicaragua) (United States) 2018	Runners-up	2nd	5	3	1	1	20	5
(Mexico) 2020	Canceled							
(Dominican Republic) 2022	Runners-up	2nd	7	6	0	1	58	2
(Mexico) 2024	Runners-up	2nd	5	4	0	1	10	5
CONCACAF U-17 Women's World Cup qualifiers
2025	Group winner	1st						
(Costa Rica) 2026	Group winner	1st						
Total	1 Title	9/9	41	26	5	10	144	31

== Head-to-head record ==
The following table shows Mexico's head-to-head record in the FIFA U-17 Women's World Cup.

Opponent	Pld	W	D	L	GF	GA	GD	Win %
Australia	1	1	0	0	1	0	+1	100.00
Brazil	3	1	1	1	2	2	+0	33.33
Cameroon	1	1	0	0	1	0	+1	100.00
Canada	1	1	0	0	1	0	+1	100.00
Chile	1	1	0	0	3	1	+2	100.00
China	2	1	0	1	5	2	+3	50.00
Colombia	2	1	0	1	5	2	+3	50.00
England	1	0	0	1	2	4	−2	0.00
Germany	1	0	0	1	0	9	−9	0.00
Ghana	1	0	1	0	2	2	+0	0.00
Italy	1	0	1	0	0	0	+0	0.00
Japan	3	0	1	2	1	12	−11	0.00
Jordan	1	1	0	0	4	1	+3	100.00
Kenya	1	0	0	1	1	2	−1	0.00
Netherlands	2	1	0	1	1	1	+0	50.00
New Zealand	2	2	0	0	6	0	+6	100.00
Nigeria	2	0	0	2	1	5	−4	0.00
North Korea	2	0	0	2	1	6	−5	0.00
Paraguay	1	1	0	0	1	0	+1	100.00
South Africa	2	1	1	0	4	0	+4	50.00
South Korea	1	0	0	1	1	4	−3	0.00
Spain	4	1	1	2	4	6	−2	25.00
Venezuela	1	0	0	1	1	2	−1	0.00
Total	37	14	6	17	48	61	−13	37.84
