= Costa Rica women's national under-17 football team =

Costa Rica
- Nickname(s): La Sele (The Selection); La Tricolor (The Tricolor)
- Association: Costa Rican Football Federation
First colours	Second colours

CONCACAF U-17 Championship
- Appearances: 6 (first in 2008)
- Best result: Runners-up (2008)

FIFA U-17 Women's World Cup
- Appearances: 3 (first in 2008)
- Best result: Group stage (2008, 2014)

Costa Rica women's national under-17 football team represents Costa Rica in international youth football competitions.

== Competitive record ==
=== FIFA U-17 Women's World Cup ===
Year	Round	Position	Pld	W	D	L	GF	GA
(New Zealand) 2008	Group stage	15th	3	0	0	3	1	8
(Trinidad and Tobago) 2010	Did not qualify							
(Azerbaijan) 2012	Did not qualify							
(Costa Rica) 2014	Group stage	15th	3	0	0	3	1	6
(Jordan) 2016	Did not qualify							
(Uruguay) 2018	Did not qualify							
(India) 2022	Did not qualify							
(Dominican Republic) 2024	Did not qualify							
(Morocco) 2025	Group Stage	18th	3	0	1	2	2	7
(Morocco) 2026	Did not qualify							
Total	3/9		9	0	1	8	5	21

=== CONCACAF Women's U-17 Championship ===
CONCACAF Women's U-17 Championship record
Year	Result	Matches	Wins	Draws	Losses	GF	GA
(Trinidad and Tobago) 2008	Runners-up	5	2	1	2	11	11
(Costa Rica) 2010	Fourth place	5	2	0	3	10	19
(Guatemala) 2012	Did not qualify						
(Jamaica) 2013	Did not qualify						
(Grenada) 2016	Group stage	3	1	0	2	5	8
(United States) 2018	Group stage	3	1	0	2	7	7
(Dominican Republic) 2022	Quarter-finals	5	3	0	2	14	10
(Mexico) 2024	Group stage	3	0	1	2	3	5
CONCACAF U-17 Women's World Cup qualifiers
2025	Group best runners-up						
(Costa Rica) 2026	Final round						
Total	8/10	24	9	2	13	50	60

=== Previous squads ===
2008 FIFA U-17 Women's World Cup
2014 FIFA U-17 Women's World Cup
2025 FIFA U-17 Women's World Cup

== Head-to-head record ==
The following table shows Costa Rica's head-to-head record in the FIFA U-17 Women's World Cup.

Opponent	Pld	W	D	L	GF	GA	GD	Win %
Brazil	1	0	1	0	1	1	+0	0.00
Germany	1	0	0	1	0	5	−5	0.00
Ghana	1	0	0	1	0	1	−1	0.00
Italy	2	0	0	2	0	4	−4	0.00
Morocco	1	0	0	1	1	3	−2	0.00
North Korea	1	0	0	1	1	2	−1	0.00
Venezuela	1	0	0	1	0	3	−3	0.00
Zambia	1	0	0	1	1	2	−1	0.00
Total	9	0	1	8	4	21	−17	0.00

== See also ==
- Costa Rica women's national football team
