= 2008 CONCACAF Women's U-17 Championship =

2008 CONCACAF Under-17 Women's Championship
Trinidad and Tobago 2008

Tournament details
- Host country: Trinidad and Tobago
- Dates: 17–27 July
- Teams: 8 (from 1 confederation)
- Venue(s): 2 (in 2 host cities)

Final positions
- Champions: United States (1st title)
- Runners-up: Costa Rica
- Third place: Canada
- Fourth place: Mexico

Tournament statistics
- Matches played: 16
- Goals scored: 77 (4.81 per match)
- Top scorer(s): (Canada) Tiffany Cameron (Costa Rica) Katherine Alvarado (United States) Courtney Verloo (5 goals each)

The 2008 CONCACAF Under-17 Women's Championship was the first tournament of this type in Concacaf the tournament was held in Trinidad and Tobago from July 17–27, 2008. The first, second and third placed teams qualified for the 2008 FIFA U-17 Women's World Cup held in New Zealand.

== Qualified teams ==
Region	Method of qualification	Teams
Caribbean; Caribbean Football Union (CFU)	2007 Caribbean Football Union; Women's Under-17 Tournament	Jamaica; Puerto Rico
Central America; Central American Football Union (UNCAF)	2007 UNCAF Women's; Under-17 Tournament	El Salvador; Costa Rica
North America; North American Football Union (NAFU)	Automatic qualification	Canada; Mexico; United States
Host nation		Trinidad and Tobago

== Group stage ==
All times are local (UTC−06:00).

Key to colors in group tables
Advanced to Semi-finals

=== Group A ===
Team	Pld	W	D	L	GF	GA	GD	Pts
United States	3	3	0	0	24	1	+23	9
Costa Rica	3	1	1	1	8	7	+1	4
Trinidad and Tobago	3	1	1	1	6	10	−4	4
El Salvador	3	0	0	3	2	22	−20	0

18 July 2008

Costa Rica	0–6	United States
		S. Mewis 3', 54'; Verloo 16', 49'; Roberts 27' (pen.); DiMartino 37'

Marvin Lee Stadium, Macoya
Referee: Dianne Ferreira-James (Guyana)
18 July 2008

Trinidad and Tobago	5–1	El Salvador
Shade 15'; Prentice 33'; DeLeon 35', 38'; Mckenzie 84'		Flores 17'

Marvin Lee Stadium, Macoya
Referee: Quetzalli Alvarado (Mexico)

20 July 2008

United States	9–0	El Salvador
Nuzzolese 4', 63', 78'; Klei 9'; Brian 12'; Costa 15'; Brooks 27', 37'; Bennett 49' (pen.)

Marvin Lee Stadium, Macoya
Referee: Carol-Anne Chenard (Canada)
20 July 2008

Trinidad and Tobago	0–0	Costa Rica

Marvin Lee Stadium, Macoya
Referee: Sabina Charles (Saint Lucia)

22 July 2008

El Salvador	1–8	Costa Rica
Landaverde 26'		Rodríguez Cedeño 18'; Morales 28'; Cruz 43', 55'; Alvarado 60', 63', 90+1'; Campos 68'

Marvin Lee Stadium, Macoya
Referee: Michelle Pye (Canada)
22 July 2008

Trinidad and Tobago	1–9	United States
Shade 13'		K. Mewis 2', 18' (pen.); Verloo 11', 56'; DiMartino 20'; Johnson 24'; Harris 42'; S. Mewis 46', 76'

Marvin Lee Stadium, Macoya
Referee: Quetzalli Alvarado (Mexico)

=== Group B ===
Team	Pld	W	D	L	GF	GA	GD	Pts
Canada	3	3	0	0	11	4	+7	9
Mexico	3	2	0	1	11	4	+7	6
Puerto Rico	3	1	0	2	2	8	−6	3
Jamaica	3	0	0	3	4	12	−8	0

17 July 2008

Puerto Rico	0–3	Canada
		Lamarre 26'; Zadorsky 68'; Maltais 73'

Dwight Yorke Stadium, Bacolet
Referee: Erika Vargas (Costa Rica)
17 July 2008

Mexico	6–0	Jamaica
Rangel 2', 11'; Padilla 17'; Díaz 39'; Corral 81', 90'

Dwight Yorke Stadium, Bacolet
Referee: Shane de Silva (Trinidad and Tobago)

19 July 2008

Mexico	4–0	Puerto Rico
Garciamendez 5', 72'; Corral 80', 86'

Dwight Yorke Stadium, Bacolet
Referee: Shane de Silva (Trinidad and Tobago)
19 July 2008

Canada	4–3	Jamaica
Zadorsky 13'; Cameron 27', 39'; Harrison 84'		Morris 24' (pen.); Pryce 30'; Campbell 79'

Dwight Yorke Stadium, Bacolet
Referee: Cecibel Ortega (El Salvador)

21 July 2008

Jamaica	1–2	Puerto Rico
Procope 85'		Cruz 17'; Dudley 63'

Dwight Yorke Stadium, Bacolet
Referee: Deysi Martínez (El Salvador)
21 July 2008

Canada	4–1	Mexico
Harrison 14'; Cameron 50', 76'; Maltais 80'		Díaz 77'

Dwight Yorke Stadium, Bacolet
Referee: Erika Vargas (Costa Rica)

== Knockout stage ==
All times are local (UTC−06:00).

The winners of the two semifinal matches and the winner of the third place match qualified for the 2008 FIFA U-17 Women's World Cup, held in New Zealand.

Semi-finals
24 July – Tobago
United States	1
Mexico	0
24 July – Tobago
Canada	0
Costa Rica	2

Final
27 July – Tobago
United States	4
Costa Rica	1
Third place
27 July – Tobago
Canada	1
Mexico	0

=== Semi-finals ===
24 July 2008

Canada	0–2	Costa Rica
		Sánchez 70'; Alvarado 75' (pen.)

Marvin Lee Stadium, Macoya
24 July 2008

United States	1–0	Mexico
Dunn 90+1'

Marvin Lee Stadium, Macoya

=== Third place ===
27 July 2008

Canada	1–0	Mexico
Cameron 32'

Marvin Lee Stadium, Macoya

=== Final ===
27 July 2008

United States	4–1	Costa Rica
Costa 1', 7'; K. Mewis 31'; Verloo 43'		Alvarado 72'

Marvin Lee Stadium, Macoya

== Winners ==
2008 CONCACAF Women's U-17 Championship

United States
First title

== Goalscorers ==
The top-scorer award was shared between Katherine Alvarado (Costa Rica), Tiffany Cameron (Canada) and Courtney Verloo (USA) with five goals each.
