= Mak Whitham =

American soccer player (born 2010)

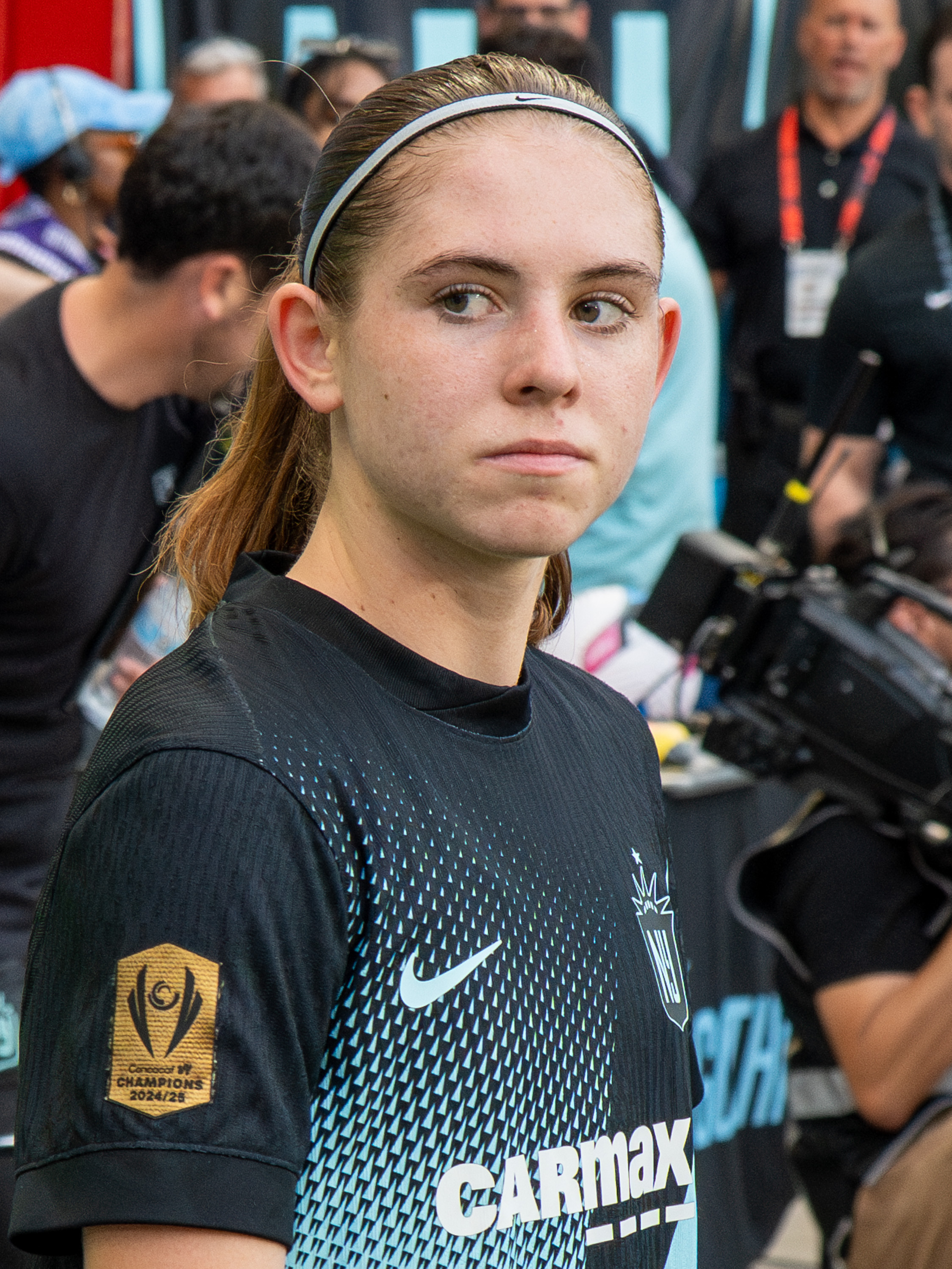
- Whitham with Gotham FC in 2025

Personal information
- Full name: Mckenna Rae Whitham
- Date of birth: July 27, 2010 (age 16)
- Height: 5 ft 5 in (1.65 m)
- Position: Forward

Team information
- Current team: DC Power FC (on loan from Gotham FC)
- Number: 17

Youth career
- 2022–2023: MVLA
- 2023–2024: Slammers FC HB Køge

Senior career*
Years	Team	Apps	(Gls)
2024	Santa Clarita Blue Heat	5	(9)
2025–	Gotham FC	7	(0)
2026–	→ DC Power FC (loan)	1	(0)

International career^{‡}
2024	United States U-15	5	(6)
2025–	United States U-17	8	(7)
- * Club domestic league appearances and goals as of August 15, 2026 ‡ National team caps and goals as of March 22, 2026

Mckenna Rae Whitham (born July 27, 2010) is an American professional soccer player who plays as a forward for USL Super League club DC Power FC, on loan from Gotham FC. The youngest player in National Women's Soccer League (NWSL) history, she joined Gotham FC at age 13 and made her NWSL debut at age 14 in 2025. She is a youth United States youth international.

== Early life ==
Whitham grew up in Granite Bay, California, the daughter of Joni and Josh Whitham, and was homeschooled by her mother. Her father was an alternate for the United States Ski Team at the 1998 Winter Olympics as a high schooler. Whitham played ECNL club soccer for MVLA Soccer Club and Slammers FC HB Køge. She led MVLA to the under-13 national finals in July 2023, finishing runners-up to Slammers. She signed a name, image, and likeness contract with Nike in February 2024 at age 13, becoming the youngest athlete to sign with the company.

== Club career ==
When she was 13 years old, Whitham trained as a non-roster invitee with National Women's Soccer League clubs Kansas City Current, Washington Spirit, and NJ/NY Gotham FC in the 2024 preseason. She became the youngest person to play for an NWSL team when she appeared in an exhibition game for Gotham at the Women's Cup in Colombia, even scoring the last-minute game winner against Deportivo Cali. Gotham general manager Yael Averbuch West said Whitham "is clearly very ready, not just to handle this level, but to excel in our sessions". She continued to train with Gotham throughout the year and also trained with the boys' Los Angeles FC Academy of MLS Next and Santa Clarita Blue Heat of United Women's Soccer (UWS). The youngest player in UWS history at 13, she scored the opening goal for Santa Clarita in the national UWS semifinals and converted her penalty kick in the team's championship shootout victory in July 2024.

Gotham announced on July 26, 2024, that they had signed Whitham to a four-year under-18 contract effective January 1, 2025, making her the youngest signing in NWSL history, one day before her 14th birthday. She reached an additional short-term deal which allowed her to debut for Gotham two days later. When she logged 17 minutes off the bench for Katie Stengel during a 2–1 win against the Washington Spirit in the NWSL x Liga MX Femenil Summer Cup group stage, she became the youngest player in top-division American soccer history. She made two further appearances during the year, including as a 66th-minute substitute in the Summer Cup final, which Gotham lost 2–0 to the Kansas City Current.

Whitham made her NWSL regular-season debut on March 15, 2025, as a stoppage-time substitute for Esther González in the season opener against the Seattle Reign. This made her the youngest player in league history at 14 years, 8 months, surpassing Melanie Barcenas. On September 2, she made her first professional start and played 45 minutes until being substituted for Katie Stengel in a 2–0 win over Alianza in the CONCACAF W Champions Cup group stage. She was unused in the playoffs as Gotham won the 2025 NWSL Championship over the Washington Spirit.

On August 4, 2026, it was announced that Whitham would join USL Super League club DC Power FC on loan for the rest of the year. She made her league debut later that month in a season-opening 1–0 loss to the Carolina Ascent.

== International career ==
Whitham was called into training camp with the United States under-15 team at age 13 in October 2023. The next year, she scored three goals in three games at the 2024 CONCACAF Girls' U-15 Championship, including in the semifinals against Canada and the final 3–0 win against Mexico. Later that year, she scored against Norway at the 2025 FIFA U-17 Women's World Cup in Morocco to become the youngest American to score in the competition. She starred for the under-17s in the 2026 CONCACAF U-17 Women's World Cup qualification, ranking second on the team with five goals.

== Career statistics ==
=== Club ===
As of November 23, 2025

Club	Season	League			Playoffs		Continental (Note: Includes CONCACAF W Champions Cup)		Other		Total	
Club	Season	Division	Apps	Goals	Apps	Goals	Apps	Goals	Apps	Goals	Apps	Goals
Gotham FC	2024	NWSL	0	0	0	0	—		3 (Note: Appearances in NWSL x Liga MX Femenil Summer Cup)	0	3	0
Gotham FC	2025	NWSL	6	0	0	0	3	0	—		9	0
Career total			6	0	0	0	3	0	3	0	12	0

== Honors ==
Gotham FC

- NWSL Championship: 2025
- NWSL Challenge Cup: 2026
- CONCACAF W Champions Cup: 2024–25

Santa Clarita Blue Heat

- United Women's Soccer: 2024

United States U-15

- CONCACAF Girls' Under-15 Championship: 2024
