= Maddie DiMaria =

American soccer player (born 2009)

Personal information
- Full name: Madeline Rose DiMaria
- Date of birth: February 16, 2009 (age 17)
- Height: 5 ft 7 in (1.70 m)
- Position: Forward

Team information
- Current team: Angel City FC
- Number: 28

Youth career
- St. Louis Scott Gallagher
- 2024–2026: Cor Jesu Chargers

Senior career*
Years	Team	Apps	(Gls)
2026–	Angel City FC	0	(0)

International career^{‡}
2024	United States U-15	7	(2)
2025	United States U-16	2	(0)
2025–2026	United States U-17	23	(24)
- * Club domestic league appearances and goals ‡ National team caps and goals as of November 1, 2026

Madeline Rose DiMaria (born February 16, 2009) is an American professional soccer player who plays as a forward for Angel City FC of the National Women's Soccer League (NWSL). While attending Cor Jesu Academy in St. Louis, Missouri, she became the first freshman to win Gatorade National Player of the Year and the second player to win the award twice. She won the Golden Boot at the 2026 FIFA U-17 Women's World Cup, scoring a record 12 goals for the United States.

== Early life ==
DiMaria grew up in St. Louis, Missouri, and began playing organized soccer at age four or five. She often played up several age groups and joined the varsity team at Cor Jesu Academy as a freshman. She finished her freshman season with 30 goals and 21 assists while leading Cor Jesu to a 21–4 record and the MSHSAA Class 3 state championship, scoring two goals with one assist in the 3–0 final win over Rockwood Summit. She was named the Gatorade National Player of the Year for 2024, becoming the first freshman to receive the top high school honor since the award was established in 1998. She also played basketball for Cor Jesu. She played club soccer for St. Louis Scott Gallagher, earning ECNL All-American honors.

DiMaria scored 45 goals with 19 assists as a sophomore as she led Cor Jesu to a 22–1 record and the Class 4 state championship, her second consecutive state title. After scoring four goals in the state semifinals, she had two goals and one assist in the 3–0 final win over St. Dominic. She was named the Missouri Gatorade Player of the Year for the second of three times. She finished her junior year with 67 goals and 25 assists and led Cor Jesu to a perfect 25–0 record and the Class 4 state championship, her third consecutive state title. She again had four goals in the state semifinals and followed that up with a hat trick and an assist in the 5–0 final win over St. Teresa's. Cor Jesu was ranked by United Soccer Coaches as the number one spring team in the country.

DiMaria committed to play college soccer for the North Carolina Tar Heels during her junior year. After her junior year, she was named the Gatorade National Player of the Year for the second time, becoming the second repeat winner after Morgan Andrews. She was also named Gatorade Female Player of the Year across all sports. She finished her three high school seasons with 142 career goals and, before going pro, planned to graduate early to enroll at University of North Carolina in the spring of 2027. TopDrawerSoccer ranked her as the top recruit of her class.

== Club career ==
On November 5, 2026, Angel City FC announced the signing of DiMaria to her first professional contract on a deal running through 2030. She had given up her college eligibility and signed with the club before the 2026 FIFA U-17 Women's World Cup. She made her professional debut two days later in the playoff quarterfinals, playing the last few minutes of the 1–0 extra time defeat to the Kansas City Current.

== International career ==
DiMaria began training with the United States under-14 and under-15 teams in 2023. The following year, she helped the under-15s win the 2024 CONCACAF Girls' U-15 Championship, scoring twice at the tournament. She converted a penalty kick in the semifinal shootout against Canada and started in the final against Mexico. The next year, she played friendlies with the under-16 and under-17 teams before making the roster for the 2025 FIFA U-17 Women's World Cup. She started three games at the tournament and scored one goal against China.

DiMaria led the under-17s through World Cup qualifying in 2026, scoring three goals and leading the team with five assists. She had a breakout performance at the 2026 FIFA U-17 Women's World Cup, setting a tournament record with 12 goals. She scored six in the opener against Samoa, a tournament record 17–0 victory; her six goals set a record for most goals scored by a USWNT player in a match at any level and most goals scored in a Women's World Cup match at any level. It was the most goals by a player in any World Cup match since Erling Haaland scored nine at the 2019 FIFA U-20 World Cup. She rounded out the group stage with four goals in a 6–1 win over Kenya and one goal in a 3–2 loss to China, breaking the record for goals scored in a single Women's World Cup at any level with 11 (Michelle Akers had 10 at the 1991 FIFA Women's World Cup). In the round of 16, she scored what stood as the 2–1 winner against Spain, her 12th goal of the tournament; she trailed only Just Fontaine for most goals scored in any World Cup (13 at the 1958 FIFA World Cup). She also tied Sunshine Fontes for most career goals for the USWNT at the under-17 level (24). In the quarterfinals, the United States was eliminated 3–0 by two-time defending champions North Korea.

== Personal life ==
DiMaria is the daughter of Sara (née Wingbermuehle) and Jeff DiMaria and has three siblings. Her father played professional soccer for the Colorado Rapids of Major League Soccer; her mother played college soccer for Loyola Chicago; her older sister, Ana, played for Missouri; and her older brother, Jack, plays for Saint Louis.

== Honors ==
United States U-15

- CONCACAF Girls' U-15 Championship: 2024

Individual

- FIFA U-17 Women's World Cup Golden Boot: 2026
- Gatorade National Female Player of the Year: 2026
- Gatorade National Female Soccer Player of the Year: 2024, 2026
