= KK Ream =

American soccer player (born 2009)

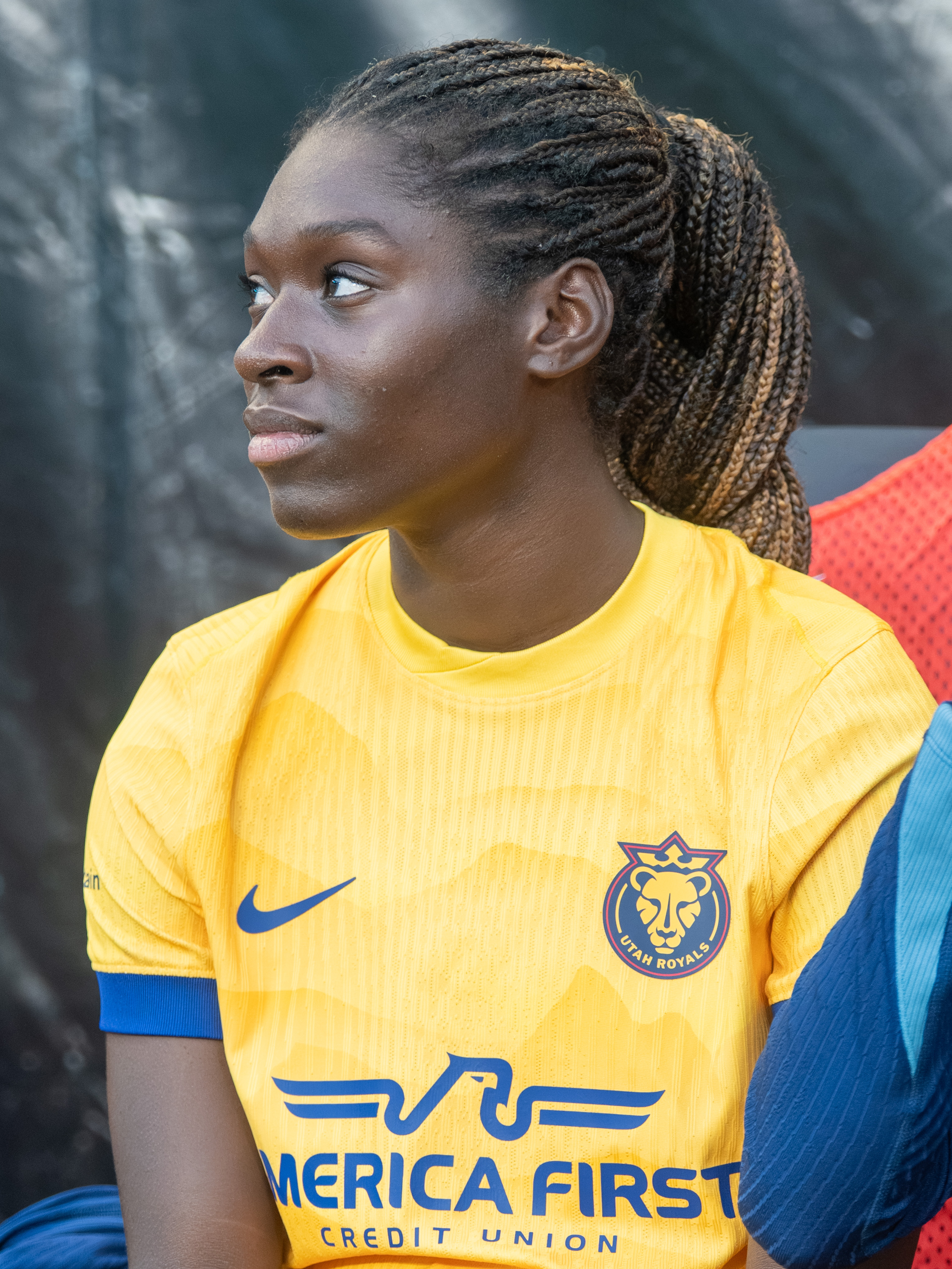
- Ream with the Utah Royals in 2025

Personal information
- Full name: Kherrington Azreal Ream
- Date of birth: July 8, 2009 (age 17)
- Place of birth: Herriman, Utah, U.S.
- Height: 5 ft 4 in (1.63 m)
- Position: Forward

Team information
- Current team: Utah Royals
- Number: 19

Youth career
- 2019–2022: Utah Royals FC AZ
- 2020–2022: RSL Arizona
- 2023–2024: Utah Avalanche

Senior career*
Years	Team	Apps	(Gls)
2025–	Utah Royals	10	(1)

International career^{‡}
2024	United States U-15	5	(0)
2025	United States U-16	2	(0)
2025–	United States U-17	3	(0)
- * Club domestic league appearances and goals as of 04:24, November 10, 2026 (UTC) ‡ National team caps and goals as of October 18, 2025

Kherrington Azreal "KK" Ream (born July 8, 2009) is an American professional soccer player who plays as a forward for the Utah Royals of the National Women's Soccer League (NWSL). She signed with the Royals at age 15 in 2024, becoming the youngest goalscorer in NWSL history the following year.

== Early life ==
Born in Herriman, Utah, Ream joined the Utah Royals FC AZ academy in 2019, where she played up several age groups. While in Arizona, she also played for the boys' team RSL Arizona of MLS Next. She often played with her twin brother, Linkon, growing up. In 2022, she returned to her home state and joined the Utah Avalanche, playing with boys her age and girls three or four years older.

== Club career ==
Ream began training with the Utah Royals professional team in the 2024 preseason. On December 11, 2024, the Royals announced that they had signed Ream to a three-year under-18 contract, making her the youngest player in team history at 15 years and 157 days old. After a preseason friendly in which Ream scored three goals against BYU, her teammate Kate Del Fava said in an interview: "Three syllables ... KK Ream".

Ream made her professional debut as a late substitute against the San Diego Wave on March 23, 2025. She became the youngest starter in NWSL history on May 3, in a 2–0 loss to the North Carolina Courage. On August 29, she scored her first professional goal, the decisive tally in a 2–1 win over the Portland Thorns. At 16 years and 52 days old, she became the youngest-ever NWSL goalscorer, beating the record set by Alex Pfeiffer the year prior. On March 26, 2026, it was announced that Ream had been placed on the season-ending injury list after having sustained an ACL tear during training.

== International career ==
Ream helped the United States win the 2024 CONCACAF Girls' U-15 Championship, converting a penalty kick in the semifinal shootout against Canada. The following year, she was named to the roster for the 2025 FIFA U-17 Women's World Cup.
