= Chloe Ricketts =

American soccer player (born 2007)

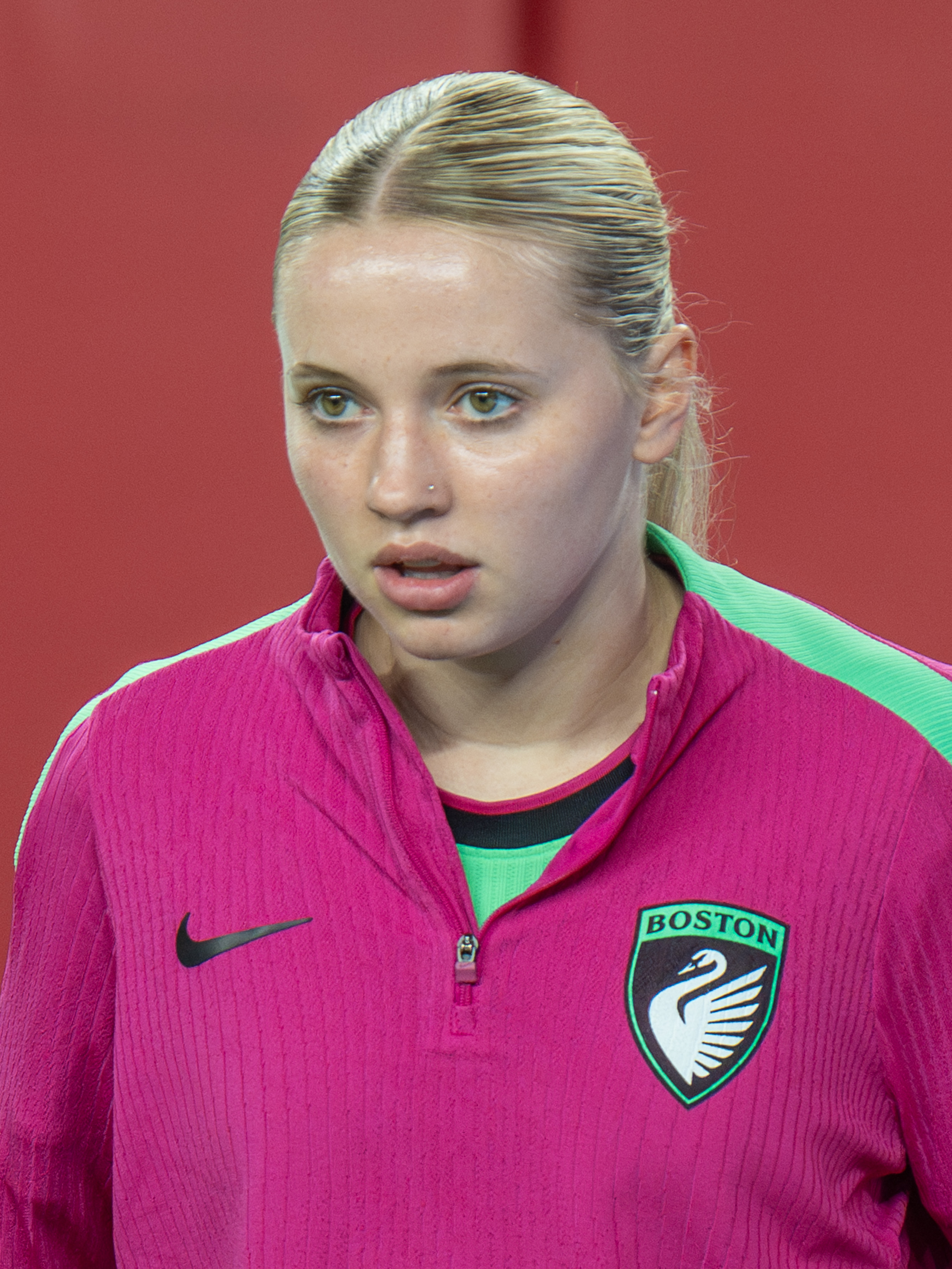
- Ricketts with the Boston Legacy in 2026

Personal information
- Full name: Chloe Cathleen Ricketts
- Date of birth: May 23, 2007 (age 19)
- Height: 5 ft 1 in (1.55 m)
- Positions: Midfielder; forward

Team information
- Current team: Boston Legacy
- Number: 11

Youth career
- 2017–2018: Michigan Hawks
- 2020–2022: Michigan Tigers

Senior career*
Years	Team	Apps	(Gls)
2022	AFC Ann Arbor	11	(2)
2023–2025	Washington Spirit	22	(0)
2025	Houston Dash	1	(0)
2026–	Boston Legacy	6	(0)

International career^{‡}
2023	United States U17	1	(1)
2025–	United States U20	5	(0)
- * Club domestic league appearances and goals as of 02:17, November 8, 2026 (UTC) ‡ National team caps and goals as of December 2, 2025

Chloe Cathleen Ricketts (born May 23, 2007) is an American professional soccer player who plays as a midfielder or forward for Boston Legacy FC of the National Women's Soccer League (NWSL). She signed with the Washington Spirit at age 15 in 2023, becoming the first player to use the NWSL Under-18 Entry Mechanism.

== Early life ==
Ricketts grew up in Dexter, Michigan. In 2017 and 2018, she won back-to-back state championships with the Michigan Hawks. She later became a regular player for a boys' team, the Michigan Tigers, where she won multiple state and regional championships, culminating with the under-15 US Youth Soccer National Championships in 2022. She also played ECNL soccer for Solar SC and GA soccer for the Michigan Jaguars.

Ricketts played for AFC Ann Arbor in the 2022 USL W League season, becoming the club's youngest-ever player in the league at age 14. She became the youngest player to score in the USL W League, netting 2 goals in 11 appearances. Before signing with the Washington Spirit, she was the 25th-best prospect in TopDrawerSoccer's rankings of 2025 college recruiting class.

== Club career ==
=== Washington Spirit ===
Washington Spirit general manager Mark Krikorian invited Ricketts to the team's training camp in the 2023 preseason. He said she "came in and she competed very, very well from the beginning and had an edge to her". On March 2, 2023, at the age of 15 years and 283 days, Ricketts signed her first professional contract with the Spirit, penning a three-year deal with an option to extend an additional year. It was the first signing under the NWSL's recently introduced Under-18 Entry Mechanism, a process established several years after Olivia Moultrie's antitrust lawsuit against the league for its minimum age requirement. Ricketts was briefly the youngest player to sign in the NWSL, surpassing Moultrie's record, before Melanie Barcenas joined the San Diego Wave later in the month.

Ricketts made her professional debut on April 15, 2023, playing 24 minutes off the bench and recording a shot attempt during a 2–1 win against the North Carolina Courage. On July 28, she scored her first professional goal in the NWSL Challenge Cup against Gotham FC, the last in a 4–2 win. Ashley Hatch fed Ricketts a through ball that she tapped in with her left foot, which made her the youngest NWSL player to score a goal at 16 years and 2 months, surpassing Moultrie. She made 17 appearances, starting 7, in all competitions in the 2023 season, logging 615 minutes. The Spirit placed eighth in the league, one point below the playoff line, and head coach Mark Parsons was fired after the season.

Ricketts's playing time dried up the following season under new coaches Adrián González and Jonatan Giráldez. She made only four appearances, totaling 20 minutes on the field, in the 2024 season. She was on the bench for the 2024 NWSL Championship, where the second-place Spirit lost 1–0 to the NWSL Shield–winning Orlando Pride.

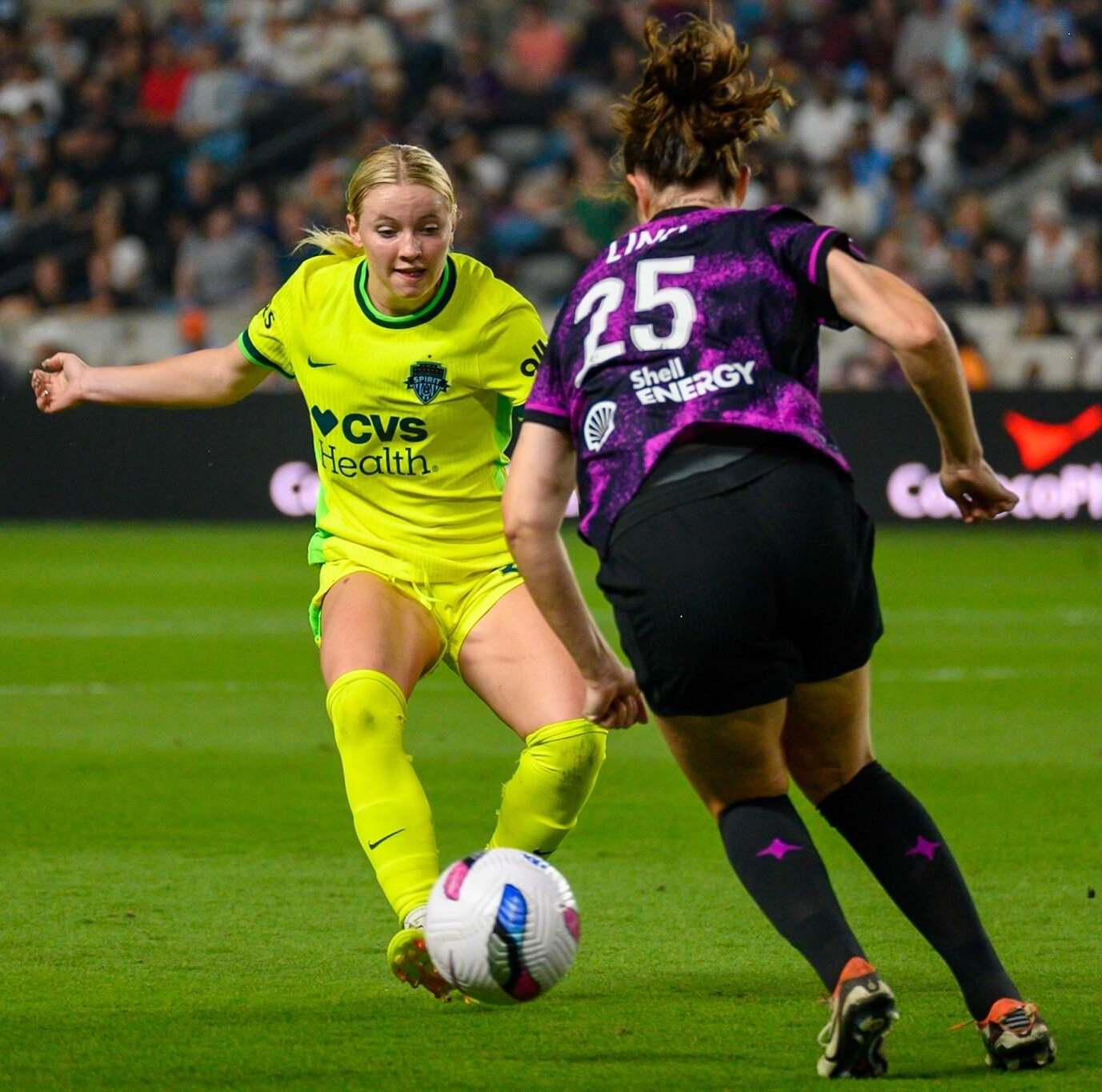
Ricketts playing for the Spirit in 2025

On March 7, 2025, with the squad depleted by injuries, Ricketts started and played 61 minutes in the 2025 NWSL Challenge Cup against the Orlando Pride. She was the youngest NWSL player to start a final. After a 1–1 draw, Washington won the championship rematch 4–2 on penalties. The following week, she made her third career regular-season start in the season opener, a 2–1 win over the Houston Dash. She possibly scored the winning goal with a shot that struck the crossbar, but it was officially credited to Ashley Hatch who finished off the rebound. On June 25, the Spirit announced that Ricketts's fourth-year contract option had been declined, making her a free agent for the 2026 season. On August 19, in her first appearance since May, she scored a goal in the Spirit's continental debut, a 7–0 away win over Salvadoran club Alianza in the 2025–26 CONCACAF W Champions Cup group stage.

=== Houston Dash ===
On October 1, 2025, the Spirit traded Ricketts to the Houston Dash in exchange for US$15,000 in intra-league transfer funds. She made one appearance for the Dash, coming on as a late substitute, in the November 2 season finale against the Portland Thorns.

=== Boston Legacy ===
The same day she was traded to the Dash, NWSL expansion team Boston Legacy announced that Ricketts had agreed to a three-year contract with the club, beginning in 2026, with the mutual option for another year.

== International career ==
=== 2023–present: Youth level ===
Ricketts trained with the United States under-15 and under-16 teams in 2022. Three years later, she trained with the under-18 team before making her under-20 debut at the 2025 CONCACAF Women's U-20 Championship, helping the United States qualify for the 2026 FIFA U-20 Women's World Cup.

== Off the field ==
=== Endorsements ===
In March 2023, at age 15, Ricketts signed a multiyear endorsement deal with the sportswear company Adidas, becoming the youngest American female soccer player to do so.

== Honors and awards ==
Washington Spirit

- NWSL Challenge Cup: 2025
