= NWSL Under-18 Entry Mechanism =

Signing of U18 players in US women's soccer league

The Under-18 Entry Mechanism sets the rules for how soccer players below the age of 18 may sign professional contracts in the National Women's Soccer League (NWSL), the top division of women's soccer in the United States.

== Background ==
The NWSL had a minimum age requirement of 18 until 2021, when 15-year-old Olivia Moultrie filed an antitrust lawsuit against the league. She reached a settlement that allowed her to sign with Portland Thorns FC after going through a league discovery process that involved her rights being acquired by OL Reign and traded to the Thorns. The following year, the NWSL allowed 17-year-old Jaedyn Shaw to sign with San Diego Wave FC through discovery, with five other teams submitting bids for her rights including the Washington Spirit which she had trained with for months. Other sports leagues in the United States continue to have minimum requirements, such as 18 in the National Hockey League and Major League Baseball. Major League Soccer allows younger players to sign contracts which occurs mostly for development purposes.

The NWSL introduced the Under-18 Entry Mechanism on November 14, 2022, establishing a formal process for signing players under the age of 18. As of 2024, the NWSL allows teams to have up to four under-18 players between their private entry list and roster. Players must be signed within a month of being named to the entry list, and their contracts must last through the season in which they turn 18. Until coming of age, under-18 players may not be cut from their team's roster nor traded (unless the player and her parent or guardian consents) nor selected in an expansion draft. In addition to contractual protections, under-18 players are required to live with a parent or guardian and use separate showers and locker rooms.

Chloe Ricketts was the first player to sign through the Under-18 Entry Mechanism, joining the Washington Spirit on March 3, 2023, at the age of 15.

== List of signings ==
As of January 24, 2025

Current youngest signing (⁂)
Former youngest signing (*)

Under-18 signings in the NWSL (2023–present)
Date of signing	Player	Pos.	Team	Date of birth	Age at signing
March 3, 2023	Chloe Ricketts *	MF	Washington Spirit	May 23, 2007	15 years, 284 days
March 21, 2023	Melanie Barcenas *	FW	San Diego Wave FC	October 30, 2007	15 years, 142 days
July 28, 2023	Riley Jackson	MF	North Carolina Courage	December 2, 2005	17 years, 238 days
October 30, 2023	Alex Pfeiffer	FW	Kansas City Current	November 26, 2007	15 years, 338 days
November 28, 2023	Gisele Thompson	DF	Angel City FC	December 2, 2005	17 years, 361 days
December 14, 2023	Claire Hutton	MF	Kansas City Current	January 11, 2006	17 years, 337 days
January 18, 2024	Casey Phair	FW	Angel City FC	June 29, 2007	16 years, 203 days
March 6, 2024	Kennedy Fuller	MF	Angel City FC	March 9, 2007	16 years, 363 days
March 13, 2024	Emeri Adames	FW	Seattle Reign FC	April 3, 2006	17 years, 345 days
March 22, 2024	Kimmi Ascanio	MF	San Diego Wave FC	January 21, 2008	16 years, 61 days
July 19, 2024	Jordyn Bugg	DF	Seattle Reign FC	August 11, 2006	17 years, 343 days
July 19, 2024	Ainsley McCammon	MF	Seattle Reign FC	August 16, 2007	16 years, 338 days
July 26, 2024	Mak Whitham ⁂	FW	NJ/NY Gotham FC	July 27, 2010	13 years, 365 days
October 11, 2024	Zoe Matthews	MF	Houston Dash	May 25, 2007	17 years, 139 days
December 11, 2024	KK Ream	FW	Utah Royals	July 8, 2009	15 years, 156 days
January 8, 2025	Katie Scott	DF	Kansas City Current	June 20, 2007	17 years, 174 days
January 16, 2025	Trinity Armstrong	DF	San Diego Wave FC	July 25, 2007	17 years, 175 days
January 24, 2025	Micayla Johnson	FW	Chicago Stars FC	January 18, 2008	17 years, 6 days
October 16, 2025	Sydney Schmidt	DF	North Carolina Courage	January 25, 2008	17 years, 264 days
December 22, 2025	Meila Brewer	DF	Kansas City Current	March 24, 2009	16 years, 273 days
January 6, 2026	Audrey McKeen	FW	Racing Louisville FC	November 26, 2008	17 years, 41 days
