= Nyanya Touray =

American soccer player (born 2008)

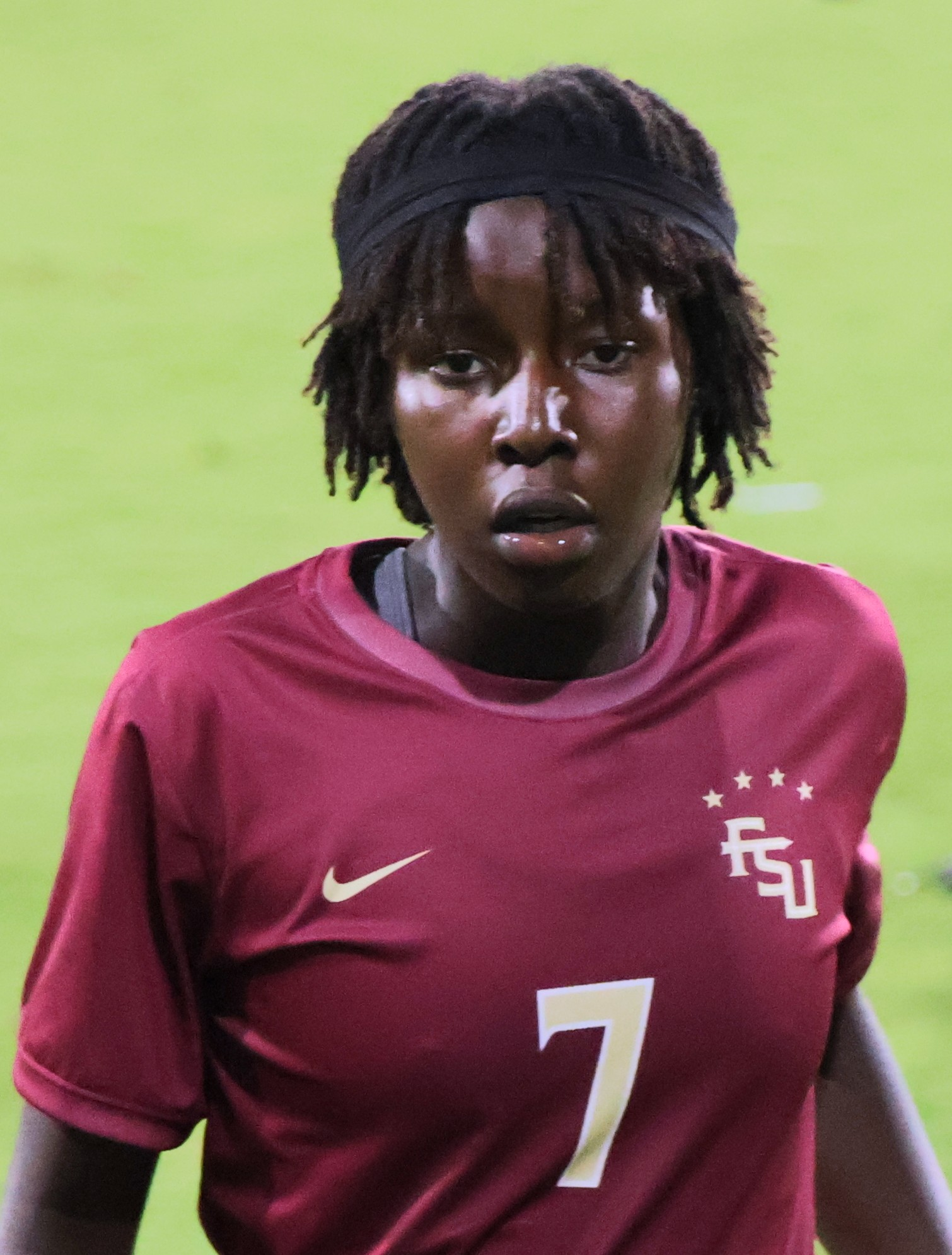
- Touray with Florida State in 2025

Personal information
- Full name: Nyanya Touray
- Date of birth: July 25, 2008 (age 18)
- Height: 5 ft 7 in (1.70 m)
- Position: Forward

Team information
- Current team: Florida State Seminoles
- Number: 7

Youth career
- 2013–2020: ESYDA
- 2020–2025: Bethesda Soccer Club

College career
Years	Team	Apps	(Gls)
2025–	Florida State Seminoles	16	(2)

International career^{‡}
2024	United States U-16		
2025	United States U-17	13	(8)
2026–	United States U-19	2	(0)
2026–	United States U-20	7	(0)
- ‡ National team caps and goals as of September 16, 2026

Nyanya Touray (born July 25, 2008) is an American college soccer player who plays as a forward for the Florida State Seminoles. She won the 2025 national championship with the Seminoles. She represented the United States at the 2025 FIFA U-17 Women's World Cup and the 2026 FIFA U-20 Women's World Cup.

== Early life ==
Touray grew up in Silver Spring, Maryland. She began playing soccer when she was five, joining local club ESYDA for seven years, before moving to Bethesda Soccer Club, where she earned multiple ECNL all-conference honors. She reclassified to join the Florida State Seminoles at age 17 after graduating early from Northwood High School.

== College career ==
Touray played 16 games and scored 2 goals for the Florida State Seminoles as a freshman in 2025. After returning from the 2025 FIFA U-17 Women's World Cup, she played significant minutes in the NCAA tournament with five starts, two assists, and one goal as the Seminoles won their fifth national title, winning 1–0 against Stanford in the final.

== International career ==
Touray began training with the United States youth national team at the under-16 level in 2023. She made her under-17 debut during the 2025 CONCACAF U-17 Women's World Cup qualification. She then helped the US to the title at the 4 Nations Tournament, leading the team with three goals including the 1–0 winner off the bench in the final against Mexico. She stood out for the US at the 2025 FIFA U-17 Women's World Cup in Morocco, leading the team with four goals in three group stage games including a double against China. The US topped their group but lost to the Netherlands on penalties in the round of 16, with Touray making her penalty. Her four goals were the second-most by an American at the tournament, tying Kennedy Fuller's performance in 2024.

Touray was called into a development camp, training concurrently with the senior national team, in January 2026. She was part of the under-20 roster at the 2026 FIFA U-20 Women's World Cup in Poland, making three appearances; they lost to Brazil on penalties in the round of 16.

== Honors and awards ==
Florida State Seminoles

- NCAA Division I women's soccer tournament: 2025
