= Kennedy Fuller =

American soccer player (born 2007)

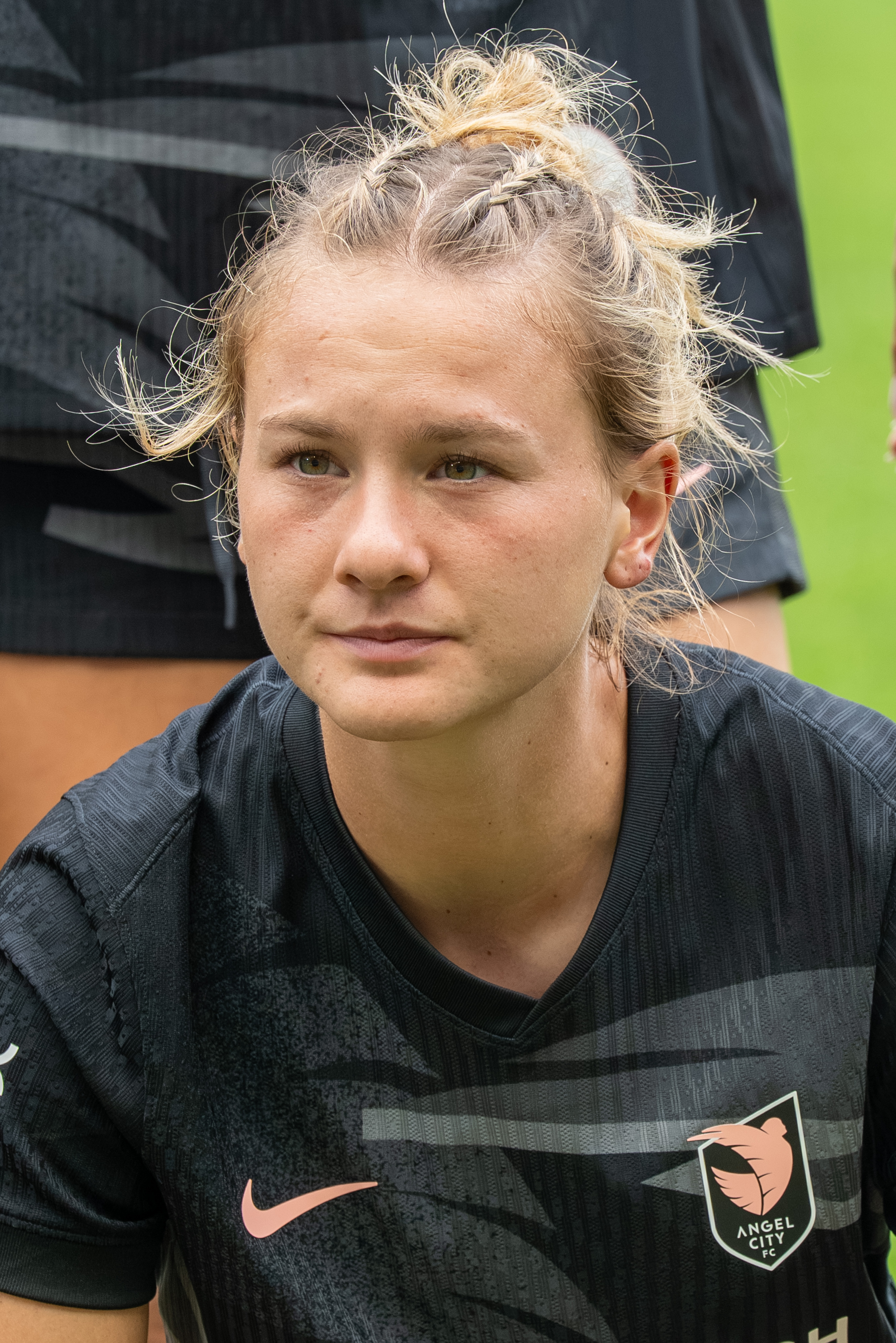
- Fuller with Angel City in 2025

Personal information
- Full name: Kennedy Linh Fuller
- Date of birth: March 9, 2007 (age 19)
- Height: 5 ft 5 in (1.65 m)
- Position: Attacking midfielder

Team information
- Current team: Bay FC
- Number: 47

Youth career
- 2019–2023: Solar SC
- 2021–2023: Southlake Carroll Dragons

Senior career*
Years	Team	Apps	(Gls)
2024–2026	Angel City	56	(7)
2026–	Bay FC	15	(2)

International career^{‡}
2022	United States U-15	7	(12)
2023	United States U-16	3	(2)
2024	United States U-17	14	(13)
2025–	United States U-20	12	(7)
Medal record
Women's soccer
Representing United States
FIFA U-17 Women's World Cup
Bronze medal – third place	2024 Dominican Republic
- * Club domestic league appearances and goals as of 05:07, November 2, 2026 (UTC) ‡ National team caps and goals as of September 16, 2026

Kennedy Linh Fuller (born March 9, 2007) is an American professional soccer player who plays as an attacking midfielder for Bay FC of the National Women's Soccer League (NWSL). She was named the Gatorade National Player of the Year in 2023 and signed with Angel City FC at age 16 in 2024. She won bronze with the United States at the 2024 FIFA U-17 Women's World Cup.

== Early life ==
Raised in Southlake, Texas, Fuller started out practicing gymnastics, winning a state championship in the sport, before taking up soccer when she was seven years old. She decided to focus on soccer at age eleven and joined powerhouse club Solar SC. With the club, she was named ECNL All-American and the U16 Conference Player of the Year in 2022.

Fuller helped lead Carroll Senior High School to the UIL Class 6A state championship as a freshman in 2022, scoring a hat trick in the final. She finished her freshman season with 26 goals and 14 assists and was named the Dallas Morning News Player of the Year and the Texas Gatorade Player of the Year. She scored a school record 55 goals and added 26 assists as a sophomore while the team returned to the state final in 2023, and though she missed the end of the playoffs on international duty, she was named the Gatorade National Player of the Year. During her sophomore year, she committed to play college soccer for the North Carolina Tar Heels with the plan to graduate one year early.

TopDrawerSoccer had ranked Fuller as the 3rd-best recruit in the class of 2025, and after reclassifying, she was ranked the 7th-best recruit in the class of 2024. After committing to North Carolina, she went on training stints with various professional clubs including the Washington Spirit, Kansas City Current, San Diego Wave, North Carolina Courage, Chelsea, and finally Angel City FC. She also signed a name, image, and likeness (NIL) contract with Nike.

== Club career ==
=== Angel City ===
Angel City FC announced on March 6, 2024, that they had signed Fuller to her first professional contract through the NWSL's Under-18 Entry Mechanism on a three-year deal with the option for another year. She gave up her college eligibility and became the club's second-youngest signing after Casey Phair. Later that month, on March 17, she made her professional debut in the season opener at BMO Stadium, starting and playing 90 minutes in a 1–0 loss to Bay FC, becoming the youngest player to play for Angel City. On June 19, she scored her first professional goal in the 17th minute of the 3–2 home win over Racing Louisville. She finished her rookie season with 1 goal in 19 league appearances.

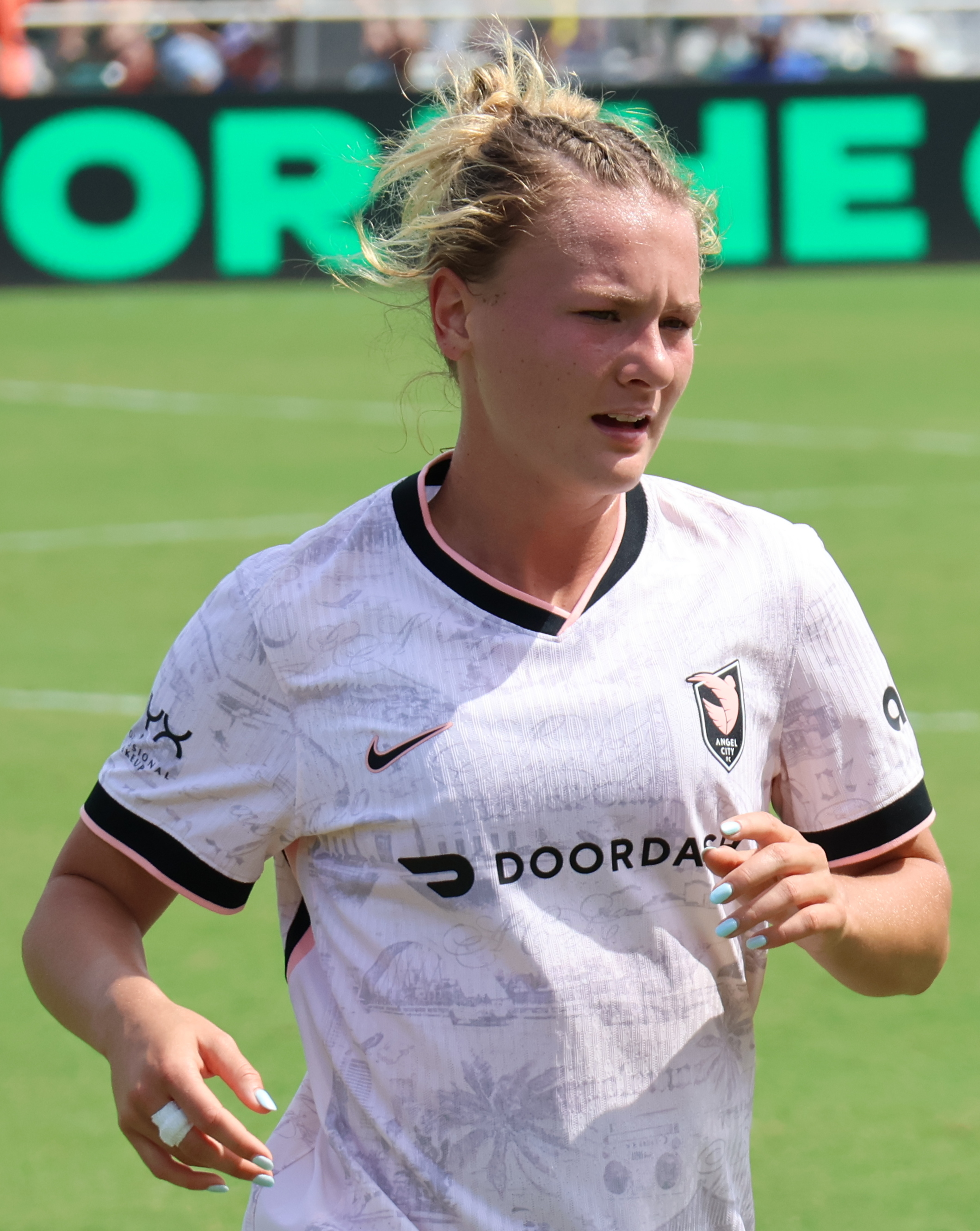
Fuller with Angel City in 2025

On March 16, 2025, Fuller began the season with her first professional assist, delivering a perfectly weighted ball for Alyssa Thompson's equalizer in a 1–1 draw with the San Diego Wave. The next week, she scored her first goal of the season against the Portland Thorns, again a 1–1 draw. The following week, she again assisted Thompson in a 2–1 win over the Seattle Reign, earning NWSL Assist of the Week. After new head coach Alexander Straus arrived in the summer break, she was deployed in a more defensive midfield role for several games before returning to her usual attacking position. On October 12, she scored in a 2–0 win over the Houston Dash to keep Angel City in the playoff hunt, winning NWSL Player of the Week for her performance. She nearly doubled her playing time in her second season, appearing in all 26 games and scoring 4 goals.

On March 15, 2026, Fuller became the seventh NWSL player to reach ten career goal contributions as a teenager, scoring a goal and assisting Evelyn Shores in a season-opening 4–0 win over the Chicago Stars. The following week, she assisted Sveindís Jane Jónsdóttir in a 3–1 victory over Bay FC as her team started the youngest winning eleven in NWSL history (23 years, 142 days).

=== Bay FC ===
On June 17, 2026, Fuller was traded to Bay FC alongside an international roster spot for US$500,000 in intraleague transfer funds and US$20,000 in allocation funds. She debuted for the club in a 2–2 draw with the Boston Legacy on July 5. The following week, she scored her first goal for Bay in a 2–0 victory over Racing Louisville, matching Mallory Swanson in fourth place for most NWSL goals as a teenager.

== International career ==
Fuller made her international debut for the United States under-15 team in June 2022, scoring three times in two friendlies. She then captained the United States to victory at the 2022 CONCACAF Girls' U-15 Championship, leading the team with nine goals and being awarded the Golden Ball as the best player at the tournament. In 2023, she led the under-16s to the title at the Montaigu Tournament. She scored eight goals for the under-17 team at the 2024 CONCACAF Women's U-17 Championship, winning the Golden Boot as the tournament's top scorer after helping the United States win their sixth championship.

Fuller then led the United States to third place at the 2024 FIFA U-17 Women's World Cup in the Dominican Republic, its best result since 2008. She scored in three consecutive games against Colombia and South Korea in the group stage and Nigeria in the quarterfinals, leading the team to their first semifinal appearance since 2008. After losing to North Korea in the semifinals, she had a goal and an assist against England to secure third place. She finished the tournament having started all six games, captaining three matches, and leading the team in scoring with four goals with three assists, and was awarded the Silver Boot as the tournament's second top scorer. She was one of five nominees for U.S. Soccer Young Female Player of the Year alongside U-17 USWNT teammates Trinity Armstrong and Jordyn Bugg.

Fuller made her under-20 debut at the 2025 CONCACAF Women's U-20 Championship, scoring two goals and providing four assists in just two appearances. According to a prior agreement, she returned to Angel City before the semifinals, where the United States without her lost to Canada to miss the CONCACAF U-20 final for the first time. She captained the under-20s at the 2026 FIFA U-20 Women's World Cup in Poland, scoring a hat trick against New Zealand to clinch a knockout berth. Brazil eliminated the United States on penalties after a 1–1 draw in the round of 16.

== Personal life ==
Fuller is the daughter of Kim and Kris Fuller. She has a younger sister, Kamdyn, who plays for the TCU Horned Frogs, and a younger brother, Kolton. She is of Vietnamese descent through her maternal grandmother.

== Career statistics ==
=== Club ===
As of May 2, 2026

Appearances and goals by club, season and competition
Club	Season	League			Playoffs		Other		Total	
Club	Season	Division	Apps	Goals	Apps	Goals	Apps	Goals	Apps	Goals
Angel City FC	2024	NWSL	19	1	—		4 (Note: Appearances in NWSL x Liga MX Femenil Summer Cup)	1	23	2
Angel City FC	2025	NWSL	26	4	—		—		26	4
Angel City FC	2026	NWSL	6	1	—		—		6	1
Career total			51	6	0	0	4	1	55	7

== Honors and awards ==
United States U-15

- CONCACAF Girls' U-15 Championship: 2022

United States U-17

- CONCACAF Women's U-17 Championship: 2024
- FIFA U-17 Women's World Cup bronze medal: 2024

Individual

- CONCACAF Girls' U-15 Championship Golden Ball: 2022
- CONCACAF Women's U-17 Championship Golden Boot: 2024
- FIFA U-17 Women's World Cup Silver Boot: 2024
