= Meila Brewer =

American soccer player (born 2009)

Personal information
- Full name: Meila Madison Brewer
- Date of birth: March 24, 2009 (age 17)
- Place of birth: Springfield, Missouri, U.S.
- Height: 5 ft 8 in (1.73 m)
- Position: Center back

Team information
- Current team: Dallas Trinity
- Number: 4

Youth career
- KC Athletics

College career
| Years | Team | Apps | (Gls) |
| 2025 | UCLA Bruins | 9 | (0) |

Senior career*
| Years | Team | Apps | (Gls) |
| 2026 | Kansas City Current | 0 | (0) |
| 2026– | Dallas Trinity | 3 | (0) |

International career^{‡}
| 2024 | United States U-15 | | |
| 2025 | United States U-16 | | |
| 2025– | United States U-17 | 19 | (2) |
- * Club domestic league appearances and goals as of October 10, 2026 ‡ National team caps and goals as of 00:02, November 5, 2026 (UTC)

Meila Madison Brewer (born March 24, 2009) is an American professional soccer player who plays as a center back for USL Super League club Dallas Trinity. She played one season of college soccer for the UCLA Bruins. She represented the United States at the 2025 FIFA U-17 Women's World Cup.

== Early life ==
Brewer was born in Springfield, Missouri, and raised in Roseville, California. She started out running track, holding her first national record in the 60 meter dash at the under-8 age level and three other national championships in the 100 meters until the 11-12 age groups. In 2020, her family moved to Overland Park, Kansas, where she attended Blue Valley High School. She played club soccer for the Kansas City Athletics, earning ECNL all-conference honors. She took extra coursework during middle school and high school with the plan to graduate one year early. After committing to UCLA in the spring of 2025, she did even more coursework to graduate an additional year earlier. Before reclassifying, she was ranked as the top recruit of the 2027 class in multiple ranking forums.

== College career ==
Brewer joined the UCLA Bruins as a twice reclassified freshman in 2025, thought to be the youngest student-athlete in UCLA history at 16 years old. She made 9 appearances, starting 8, while missing parts of the season on international duty including the 2025 FIFA U-17 Women's World Cup. She returned for the Big Ten tournament, falling in the semifinals, and the NCAA tournament, losing in the second round on penalties.

== Club career ==
Brewer began training with the Kansas City Current as a non-roster invitee in 2024. In July 2025, she played in the Current's exhibition game against Palmeiras in the Teal Rising Cup. On December 22, 2025, after her freshman season at UCLA, the Current announced that they had signed Brewer to her first professional contract on a three-year deal. She was unable to break into the starting lineup and made no competitive appearances. On September 2, 2026, it was announced that she and the club had mutually agreed to terminate her contract.

On September 9, 2026, it was announced that Brewer had joined USL Super League club Dallas Trinity on a year-and-a-half contract. She made her professional debut four days later, starting and playing the full match in a 2–1 win over DC Power FC; despite heading an own goal, she was praised for her overall performance by club captain Sophia Braun.

== International career ==
Brewer helped the United States under-15 team win the 2024 CONCACAF Girls' U-15 Championship, scoring a stoppage-time goal to conclude a 3–0 win over Mexico in the final. She was the second-youngest player on the under-17 team that won the 4 Nations Tournament in 2025. She then started all four games and scored one goal at the 2025 FIFA U-17 Women's World Cup in Morocco, helping the under-17s top their group before losing to the Netherlands on penalties in the round of 16. She has 6 international goals in her USYNT appearances.

== Personal life ==
Brewer is the daughter of Austin and Shelly Brewer and has three sisters. Her father played college basketball, and her mother played college softball. Her older sister, Sasha, plays college soccer for Grand Canyon University. Younger sister Kaiya is the youngest player for KC Current II. Youngest sister Tayla plays ECNL for the Utah Royals.

== Honors ==
United States U-15

- CONCACAF Girls' U-15 Championship: 2024
