= Canada girls' national under-15 soccer team =

Canada Under-15
- Nickname(s): The Canucks, Les Rouges (The Reds)
- Association: Canadian Soccer Association
- Confederation: CONCACAF (North America)
- FIFA code: CAN
First colours	Second colours

CONCACAF Girls' Under-15 Championship
- Appearances: 5 (first in 2014)
- Best result: Champions (2014)

The Canada U-15 girl's national soccer team (also known as Canada Under-15s or Canada U-15s) represents Canada in international soccer at this age level. They are overseen by the Canadian Soccer Association, the governing body for soccer in Canada. They have appeared in all five CONCACAF Girls' Under-15 Championship tournaments to date, winning in 2014, finishing as runners-up in 2016 and 2022, and claiming third place in 2024.

== Competitive record ==
Champions Runners-up Third place Tournament played fully or partially on home soil

=== CONCACAF U-15 Championship ===
CONCACAF U-15 Championship record
Year	Result	Pos	Pld	W	D	L	GF	GA
(Cayman Islands) 2014	Champions	1st	6	5	0	1	22	2
(United States) 2016	Runners-up	2nd	7	6	0	1	32	3
(United States) 2018	Group stage	5th	3	2	0	1	9	2
2020	Postponed due to COVID-19 pandemic							
(United States) 2022	Runners-up	2nd	3	2	0	1	10	6
(Costa Rica) 2024	Third place	3rd	5	3	0	2	10	3
Total	5/5		24	15	0	6	83	16

== See also ==
- Canada women's national soccer team
- Canada women's national under-20 soccer team
- Canada women's national under-17 soccer team
- Soccer in Canada
