= 2022 CONCACAF Girls' U-15 Championship =

2022 CONCACAF Girls' Under-15 Championship

Tournament details
- Host country: United States
- City: Tampa Bay, FL
- Dates: 31 July – 7 August
- Teams: 32 (from CONCACAF + UEFA confederations)
- Venue: 1 (in 1 host city)

Final positions
- Champions: United States (3rd title)
- Runners-up: Canada

Tournament statistics
- Matches played: 44
- Goals scored: 159 (3.61 per match)
- Top scorer: (United States Virgin Islands) Gabriella Quezada
- Best player: (United States) Kennedy Fuller
- Fair play award: United States

The 2022 CONCACAF Girls' U-15 Championship was an international football tournament that took take place in Tampa Bay, Florida during July and August 2022.

The United States won third consecutive titles, after defeating Canada 4–1 in the final.

== Teams ==
2022 CONCACAF Women's U-15 Championship
	CFU	UNCAF	NAFU	UEFA
Teams	Anguilla; Aruba; Bahamas; Bermuda; Cayman Islands; Dominican Republic; Guyana; Jamaica; Martinique; Puerto Rico; Turks and Caicos Islands; (United States Virgin Islands) U.S. Virgin Islands	Belize; Costa Rica; Honduras; Nicaragua	Canada; Mexico; United States	Wales

Wales are an invitee.

== Venues ==
All matches will take place at the Hillsborough County Tournament Sportsplex in Tampa, Florida.

Tampa
Hillsborough County Tournament Sportsplex
27.964157°N 82.452606°W

== Group stage ==
In order to maintain balance and ensure the best development for all youth players, the teams were divided into two leagues based on their CONCACAF Women's U-17 Rankings and then sub-divided into groups.

=== Tiebreakers ===
1. Greatest number of points obtained in all matches
2. Goal difference in all group matches
3. Greatest number of goals in all matches
4. If 2 or more teams are tied based on above
  1. Greatest number of points scored in matches between the tied teams
  2. Greatest goal difference in matches between the tied teams
  3. Greatest number of goals scored in matches between the tied teams
  4. The lowest number of points based on yellow and red cards in all group matches
    1. First yellow card = +1 point
    2. Second yellow card/indirect red card = +3 points
    3. Direct red card = +4 points
    4. Yellow card and direct red card = +5 points
  5. Drawing of lots by CONCACAF

2022 CONCACAF Women's U-15 Championship
	Group A	Group B	Group C
League A (8 teams)	Mexico; Costa Rica; Dominican Republic; Wales	United States; Canada; Jamaica; Puerto Rico	
League B (12 teams)	Bermuda; Belize women's national football team; Anguilla; Martinique	Honduras; Bahamas; (United States Virgin Islands) U.S. Virgin Islands; Aruba	Nicaragua; Guyana; Turks and Caicos Islands; Cayman Islands

=== League A ===
==== Group A ====
Pos	Team	Pld	W	D	L	GF	GA	GD	Pts	Qualification
1	Mexico	3	3	0	0	8	1	+7	9	Knockout stage
2	Dominican Republic	3	2	0	1	4	4	0	6	Knockout stage
3	Wales	3	1	0	2	4	3	+1	3	
4	Costa Rica	3	0	0	3	1	9	−8	0	

Updated to match(es) played on August 6, 2022. Source: CONCACAF Women's U-15
Rules for classification: Tiebreakers
August 1, 2022

Costa Rica	0–3	Dominican Republic
	Report

Hillsborough County Sportsplex Field 1
August 1, 2022

Wales	0–2	Mexico
	Report

Hillsborough County Sportsplex Field 1

August 2, 2022

Dominican Republic	0–4	Mexico
	Report

Hillsborough County Sportsplex Field 1
August 2, 2022

Wales	4–0	Costa Rica
	Report

Hillsborough County Sportsplex Field 1

August 4, 2022

Mexico	2–1	Costa Rica
	Report

Hillsborough County Sportsplex Field 1
August 4, 2022

Dominican Republic	1–0	Wales
	Report

Hillsborough County Sportsplex Field 1

==== Group B ====
Pos	Team	Pld	W	D	L	GF	GA	GD	Pts	Qualification
1	United States	3	3	0	0	24	0	+24	9	Knockout stage
2	Canada	3	2	0	1	9	2	+7	6	Knockout stage
3	Puerto Rico	3	1	0	2	5	18	−13	3	
4	Jamaica	3	0	0	3	2	20	−18	0	

Source: CONCACAF Women's U-15
Rules for classification: Tiebreakers
August 1, 2022

Canada	5–0	Jamaica
	Report

Hillsborough County Sportsplex Field 2
August 2, 2022

Puerto Rico	0–12	United States
	Report

Hillsborough County Sportsplex Field 2

August 2, 2022

Jamaica	0–11	United States
	Report

Hillsborough County Sportsplex Field 2
August 2, 2022

Puerto Rico	1–4	Canada
	Report

Hillsborough County Sportsplex Field 2

August 4, 2022

United States	1–0	Canada
	Report

Hillsborough County Sportsplex Field 2
August 4, 2022

Jamaica	2–4	Puerto Rico
	Report

Hillsborough County Sportsplex Field 2

=== League B ===
==== Group C ====
Pos	Team	Pld	W	D	L	GF	GA	GD	Pts	Qualification
1	Martinique	3	2	1	0	4	0	+4	7	Knockout stage
2	Bermuda	3	2	0	1	4	1	+3	6	
3	Belize	3	1	0	2	3	5	−2	3	
4	Anguilla	3	0	1	2	1	6	−5	1	

Source: CONCACAF Women's U-15
Rules for classification: Tiebreakers
July 31, 2022

Belize	3–1	Anguilla
	Report

Hillsborough County Sportsplex Field 2
July 31, 2022

Martinique	1–0	Bermuda
	Report

Hillsborough County Sportsplex Field 3

August 1, 2022

Anguilla	0–3	Bermuda
	Report

Hillsborough County Sportsplex Field 3
August 1, 202

Martinique	3–0	Belize
	Report

Hillsborough County Sportsplex Field 1

August 3, 2022

Anguilla	0–0	Martinique
	Report

Hillsborough County Sportsplex Field 1
August 3, 2022

Bermuda	1–0	Belize
	Report

Hillsborough County Sportsplex Field 1

=== Group D ===
Pos	Team	Pld	W	D	L	GF	GA	GD	Pts	Qualification
1	Aruba	3	2	1	0	13	2	+11	7	Knockout stage
2	Honduras	3	2	0	1	18	2	+16	6	Knockout stage
3	U.S. Virgin Islands	3	1	1	1	10	7	+3	4	
4	Bahamas	3	0	0	3	1	31	−30	0	

Source: CONCACAF Women's U-15
Rules for classification: Tiebreakers
July 31, 2022

Bahamas	1–7	U.S. Virgin Islands
	Report

Hillsborough County Sportsplex Field 2
July 31, 2022

Aruba	1–0	Honduras
	Report

Hillsborough County Sportsplex Field 2

August 1, 2022

U.S. Virgin Islands	1–4	Honduras
	Report

Hillsborough County Sportsplex Field 6
August 1, 2022

Aruba	10–0	Bahamas
	Report

Hillsborough County Sportsplex Field 6

August 3, 2022

U.S. Virgin Islands	2–2	Aruba
	Report

Hillsborough County Sportsplex Field 2
August 3, 2022

Honduras	14–0	Bahamas
	Report

Hillsborough County Sportsplex Field 2

=== Group E ===
Pos	Team	Pld	W	D	L	GF	GA	GD	Pts	Qualification
1	Nicaragua	3	3	0	0	12	1	+11	9	Knockout stage
2	Cayman Islands	3	2	0	1	4	6	−2	6	Knockout stage
3	Guyana	3	0	1	2	4	8	−4	1	
4	Turks and Caicos Islands	3	0	1	2	2	7	−5	1	

Source: CONCACAF Women's U-15
Rules for classification: Tiebreakers
July 31, 2022

Guyana	2–2	Turks and Caicos Islands
	Report

Hillsborough County Sportsplex Field 3
August 1, 2022

Cayman Islands	0–5	Nicaragua
	Report

Hillsborough County Sportsplex Field 3

August 1, 2022

Turks and Caicos Islands	0–4	Nicaragua
	Report

Hillsborough County Sportsplex Field 4
August 1, 2022

Cayman Islands	3–1	Guyana
	Report

Hillsborough County Sportsplex Field 4

August 3, 2022

Turks and Caicos Islands	0–1	Cayman Islands
	Report

Hillsborough County Sportsplex Field 3
August 3, 2022

Nicaragua	3–1	Guyana
	Report

Hillsborough County Sportsplex Field 3

== Knockout stage ==
=== League A ===
Semi-finals
Mexico	0(5)
Canada	0(6)
United States	6
Dominican Republic	0

Final
Canada	1
United States	4
Third place
Mexico	5
Dominican Republic	0

Fifth Place
Wales	1(3)
Puerto Rico	1(1)

Seventh Place
Costa Rica	2
Jamaica	0

=== Semi-finals ===
August 5, 2022

Mexico	0–0	Canada
	Report
Penalties
	5–6

Hillsborough County Sportsplex Field 1

August 5, 2022

United States	6–0	Dominican Republic
	Report

Hillsborough County Sportsplex Field 2

=== Final ===
August 7, 2022

Canada	1–4	United States
	Report

Attendance: Hillsborough County Sportsplex Field 1

=== Third-place playoff ===
August 7, 2022

Mexico	5–0	Dominican Republic
	Report

Hillsborough County Sportsplex Field 1

=== Fifth-place playoff ===
August 5, 2022

Wales	1–1	Puerto Rico
	Report
Penalties
	3–1

Hillsborough County Sportsplex Field 1

=== Seventh-place playoff ===
August 5, 2022

Costa Rica	2–0	Jamaica
	Report

Hillsborough County Sportsplex Field 2

=== League B ===
Semi-finals
Nicaragua	2(4)
Honduras	2(3)
Aruba	1
Martinique	0

Final
Nicaragua	3
Aruba	1
Third place
Honduras	1
Martinique	0

Fifth Place
Bermuda	0
Cayman Islands	1

Seventh Place
(United States Virgin Islands) U.S. Virgin Islands	2
Belize	0

Ninth Place
Guyana	3
(Turks and Caicos Islands) Turks and Caicos	1

Eleventh Place
Anguilla	2
(The Bahamas) Bahamas	0

=== Semi-finals ===
August 4, 2022

Nicaragua	2–2	Honduras
	Report
Penalties
	4–3

Hillsborough County Sportsplex Field 3

August 4, 2022

Aruba	1–0	Martinique
	Report

Hillsborough County Sportsplex Field 6

=== Final ===
August 6, 2022

Nicaragua	3–1	Aruba
	Report

Attendance: Hillsborough County Sportsplex Field 1

=== Third-place playoff ===
August 6, 2022

Honduras	1–0	Martinique
	Report

Hillsborough County Sportsplex Field 1

=== Fifth-place playoff ===
August 4, 2022

Bermuda	0–1	Cayman Islands
	Report

Hillsborough County Sportsplex Field 3

=== Seventh-place playoff ===
August 4, 2022

U.S. Virgin Islands	2–0	Belize
	Report

Hillsborough County Sportsplex Field 6

=== Ninth-place playoff ===
August 4, 2022

Turks and Caicos Islands	1–3	Guyana
	Report

Hillsborough County Sportsplex Field 4

=== Eleventh-place playoff ===
August 4, 2022

Anguilla	2–0	Bahamas
	Report

Hillsborough County Sportsplex Field 4
