= 2024 CONCACAF Girls' U-15 Championship =

2024 CONCACAF Girls' Under-15 Championship

Tournament details
- Host country: League A Costa Rica; League B Trinidad and Tobago; League C Aruba
- Dates: 5 August – 11 August
- Teams: 35 (from CONCACAF confederations)

Final positions
- Champions: United States (4th title)
- Runners-up: Mexico

Tournament statistics
- Matches played: 62
- Goals scored: 211 (3.4 per match)
- Top scorer: (United States) Carolina Reyna
- Best player: (United States) Caroline Swann
- Fair play award: Mexico
- All statistics correct as of 00:53, August 10, 2024 (UTC).

The 2024 CONCACAF Girls' U-15 Championship was the fifth edition of this competition that took place in Costa Rica, Trinidad and Tobago, and Aruba during August 2024 and featured a record 34 member associations from CONCACAF. It was won by the United States.

== Format ==
33 CONCACAF member associations entered the 2024 edition, which featured a three-league system. Each league included a group stage followed by a playoff stage to determine the champion. The allocation of teams to each league was based on the March 2024 CONCACAF Women's U-17 Rankings and the final number of participants.

=== Teams ===
League A
Pot	Team	Pts	Rank
1	United States	5,336	1
1	Mexico	5,279	2
2	Canada	4,712	3
2	Haiti	2,495	4
3	Costa Rica	2,124	5
3	Puerto Rico	1,890	6
4	El Salvador	1,776	7
4	Jamaica	1,464	8

League B
Pot	Team	Pts	Rank
1	Trinidad and Tobago	975	10
1	Trinidad and Tobago HP	975	10
1	Honduras	872	12
1	Bermuda	798	13
2	Dominican Republic	784	14
2	Cuba	780	15
2	Guatemala	719	16
2	Grenada	505	17
3	Curaçao	461	18
3	Saint Kitts and Nevis	438	19
3	Barbados	264	21
3	Cayman Islands	216	22
4	Suriname	177	23
4	Belize	171	24
4	U.S. Virgin Islands	168	25
4	Antigua and Barbuda	152	26

League C
Team	Pts	Rank
Guyana	328	20
Anguilla	145	27
Saint Lucia	127	28
Turks and Caicos Islands	89	29
Dominica	68	31
Aruba	34	32
Aruba All Stars	34	32
Saint Vincent and the Grenadines	25	33
Bonaire	0	35
French Guiana	0	35
Guadeloupe	0	35

=== Draw Results ===
2024 CONCACAF Women's U-15 Championship
	Group A	Group B
League A (8 teams)	United States; Haiti; Costa Rica; Jamaica	Mexico; Canada; Puerto Rico; El Salvador

	Group C	Group D	Group E	Group F
League B (16 teams)	Trinidad and Tobago; Grenada; Curaçao; Antigua and Barbuda	(Trinidad and Tobago) Trinidad & Tobago HP; Guatemala; Saint Kitts and Nevis; U.S. Virgin Islands	Honduras; Cuba; Barbados; Belize	Bermuda; Dominican Republic; Cayman Islands; Suriname

	Group G	Group H	Group I
League C (12 teams)	Anguilla; Saint Vincent and the Grenadines; Aruba All Stars; Guyana	Saint Lucia; Aruba; French Guiana; Martinique	Turks and Caicos Islands; Dominica; Bonaire; Guadeloupe

== League A ==
=== Group Stage ===
==== Group A ====
Pos	Team	Pld	W	D	L	GF	GA	GD	Pts	Qualification
1	United States	3	3	0	0	27	0	+27	9	Knockout stage
2	Costa Rica	3	2	0	1	13	3	+10	6	Knockout stage
3	Jamaica	3	1	0	2	2	16	−14	3	
4	Haiti	3	0	0	3	1	24	−23	0	

Source: CONCACAF
Rules for classification: Tiebreakers
August 5, 2024
11:00 (09:00 UTC−6)

Haiti	0–9	Costa Rica
	Report	Azofeifa ??'; Paniagua 8', 38'; Solano ??'; García ??'; Medina 48', 70'; Osorio ??'; Murillo ??'

Proyecto Gol Fields 3, Alajuela
August 5, 2024
13:00 (11:00 UTC−6)

United States	11–0	Jamaica
Reyna 5', 25', 27', 35+1'; Manning 6'; Stanislaus 9', 33', 45'; Conway 23'; DiMaria 34'; Brewer 70'	Report

Proyecto Gol Fields 3, Alajuela
Attendance: 150
Referee: James Ramprashad (GUY)

August 6, 2024
11:00 (09:00 UTC−6)

Costa Rica	0–3	United States
	Report	Reyna 9'; Swann 49' (pen.); Conway 63'

Proyecto Gol Fields 3, Alajuela
Attendance: 200
Referee: Andrew Samuel (TRI)
August 6, 2024
13:00 (11:00 UTC−6)

Jamaica	2–1	Haiti
Jones 5'; Richards 24'	Report	Lamour 35+2'

Proyecto Gol Fields 3, Alajuela

August 8, 2024
11:00 (09:00 UTC−6)

Costa Rica	4–0	Jamaica
Solano 34'; Medina 41'; Chaverri 54'; Paniagua 70+3'	Report

Proyecto Gol Fields 3, Alajuela
August 8, 2024
13:00 (11:00 UTC−6)

United States	13–0	Haiti
Corona 1'; Conway 2', 17', 35'; Manning 31'; DiMaria 38'; Paletta 49'; Swann 54' (pen.); Kersh 55'; Saint-Vilus 66' (o.g.); Paulemond 65' (o.g.); Reyna 70'; Whitham 70+2'	Report

Proyecto Gol Fields 3, Alajuela
Attendance: 150
Referee: Amaury Majors (BER)

==== Group B ====
Pos	Team	Pld	W	D	L	GF	GA	GD	Pts	Qualification
1	Mexico	3	3	0	0	8	1	+7	9	Knockout stage
2	Canada	3	2	0	1	3	3	0	6	Knockout stage
3	El Salvador	3	1	0	2	5	3	+2	3	
4	Puerto Rico	3	0	0	3	0	9	−9	0	

Source: CONCACAF
Rules for classification: Tiebreakers
August 5, 2024
11:00 (09:00 UTC−6)

Canada	1–0	Puerto Rico
Lanzillotta 43'	Report

Proyecto Gol Field 2, Alajuela
Referee: Kenisha Prescott (GUY)
August 5, 2024
13:00 (11:00 UTC−6)

Mexico	2–0	El Salvador
Reyes 40'; García 59'	Report

Proyecto Gol Field 2, Alajuela

August 6, 2024
11:00 (09:00 UTC−6)

Puerto Rico	0–3	Mexico
	Report	Paredes 43'; Contreras 68'; Abellana 70+3'

Proyecto Gol Field 2, Alajuela
August 6, 2024
13:00 (11:00 UTC−6)

El Salvador	0–1	Canada
	Report	Hennessy 55'

Proyecto Gol Field 2, Alajuela
Referee: Eric Acuña (MEX)

August 8, 2024
11:00 (09:00 UTC−6)

Puerto Rico	0–5	El Salvador
	Report	Buerger 14'; Pacheco 48'; Alvarenga 56'; Álvarez 70'; Castillo 70+3'

Proyecto Gol Field 2, Alajuela
August 8, 2024
13:00 (11:00 UTC−6)

Mexico	3–1	Canada
Contreras 25', 47', 54'	Report	McLeod 52'

Proyecto Gol Field 2, Alajuela
Referee: McManaman Bedeau (GRN)

=== Play-off stage ===
==== 7th place ====
August 9, 2024
13:00 (11:00 UTC−6)

Haiti	0–1	Puerto Rico
	Report	Franci 49'

Proyecto Gol Field 2, Alajuela

==== 5th place ====
August 9, 2024
11:00 (9:00 UTC−6)

Jamaica	0–4	El Salvador
	Report	Alvarenga 6'; Castro 11'; Salgado 22'; Pacheco 28'

Proyecto Gol Field 2, Alajuela

=== Bracket ===
Semi-finals
United States	1 (4)
Canada	1 (2)
Costa Rica	2
Mexico	3

Final
United States	3
Mexico	0
Third place
Canada	2
Costa Rica	1

==== Semifinals ====
August 9, 2024
11:00 (9:00 UTC−6)

United States	1–1	Canada
Whitham 35+1'	Report	Brou 38'
Penalties
DiMaria (penalty scored); Ream (penalty scored); Brewer (penalty scored); Stanislaus (penalty scored)	4–2	(penalty missed) McLeod; (penalty missed) Oppong; (penalty scored) Lanzillotta; (penalty scored) Kindel

Proyecto Gol Field 3, Alajuela
Attendance: 200
Referee: Jonathan Leilon (CRC)
August 9, 2024
13:00 (11:00 UTC−6)

Mexico	3–2	Costa Rica
Abellana 36'; Contreras 50'; Paredes 70'	Report	Azofeifa 38'; Solano 46'

Proyecto Gol Field 3, Alajuela

==== Third place ====
August 11, 2024

Canada	2–1	Costa Rica
Istocki 9'; McLeod 39'	Report	Paniagua 25'

Proyecto Gol Field, Alajuela
Referee: Ray Torres (MEX)

==== Final ====
August 11, 2024

United States	3–0	Mexico
Corona 14'; Whitham 65'; Brewer 70+5'

Proyecto Gol Field, Alajuela

== League B ==
=== Group Stage ===
==== Group C ====
Pos	Team	Pld	W	D	L	GF	GA	GD	Pts	Qualification
1	Trinidad and Tobago	3	2	1	0	6	0	+6	7	Knockout stage
2	Antigua and Barbuda	3	1	2	0	6	1	+5	5	
3	Curaçao	3	1	1	1	4	2	+2	4	
4	Grenada	3	0	0	3	0	13	−13	0	

Source: CONCACAF
Rules for classification: Tiebreakers
August 5, 2024
11:00

Grenada	0–3	Curaçao
	Report	Nocento 40', 49'; Kwidama 71'

Hasely Crawford Stadium, Port of Spain
August 5, 2024
15:00

Trinidad and Tobago	0–0	Antigua and Barbuda
	Report

Hasely Crawford Stadium, Port of Spain

August 6, 2024
13:00

Antigua and Barbuda	5–0	Grenada
Skepple 3', 30', 39', 70+4'; Jarvin 46'	Report

Hasely Crawford Stadium, Port of Spain
August 6, 2024
15:00

Curaçao	0–1	Trinidad and Tobago
	Report	Williams 22'

Hasely Crawford Stadium, Port of Spain

August 8, 2024
9:00

Curaçao	1–1	Antigua and Barbuda
Nocento	Report

Hasely Crawford Stadium, Port of Spain
August 8, 2024
15:00

Trinidad and Tobago	5–0	Grenada
Goodridge 3'; Cole 13'; Toussaint 48'; Baptiste 61'; Lee Chong 67'	Report

Hasely Crawford Stadium, Port of Spain

==== Group D ====
Pos	Team	Pld	W	D	L	GF	GA	GD	Pts	Qualification
1	Guatemala	3	3	0	0	10	0	+10	9	Knockout stage
2	(Trinidad and Tobago) Trinidad High Performance	3	1	1	1	1	1	0	4	
3	U.S. Virgin Islands	3	0	2	1	1	2	−1	2	
4	Saint Kitts and Nevis	3	0	1	2	1	10	−9	1	

Source: CONCACAF
Rules for classification: Tiebreakers
August 5, 2024
9:00

Guatemala	8–0	Saint Kitts and Nevis
V. Godoy 4', 19'; Regalado 11'; N. Godoy 20', 60'; Rawlins 26'; Alarcón 43'; Martínez 68'	Report

Hasely Crawford Stadium, Port of Spain
August 5, 2024
13:00

Trinidad High Performance (Trinidad and Tobago)	0–0	U.S. Virgin Islands
	Report

Hasely Crawford Stadium, Port of Spain

August 6, 2024
9:00

U.S. Virgin Islands	0–1	Guatemala
		V. Godoy 2'

Hasely Crawford Stadium, Port of Spain
August 6, 2024
11:00

Saint Kitts and Nevis	0–1	(Trinidad and Tobago) Trinidad High Performance

Hasely Crawford Stadium, Port of Spain

August 8, 2024
11:00

Trinidad High Performance (Trinidad and Tobago)	0–1	Guatemala
		Rios 35+1'

Hasely Crawford Stadium, Port of Spain
August 8, 2024
13:00

Saint Kitts and Nevis	1–1	U.S. Virgin Islands

Hasely Crawford Stadium, Port of Spain

==== Group E ====
Pos	Team	Pld	W	D	L	GF	GA	GD	Pts	Qualification
1	Honduras	3	2	1	0	12	4	+8	7	Knockout stage
2	Cuba	3	2	1	0	9	4	+5	7	
3	Belize	3	1	0	2	4	8	−4	3	
4	Barbados	3	0	0	3	5	14	−9	0	

Source: CONCACAF
Rules for classification: Tiebreakers
August 5, 2024
9:00

Cuba	6–2	Barbados
Calvo 22', 25'; López 39', 44'; Isaac 54'; Turiño 70'	Report	Birmingham 51', 56'

Larry Gomes Stadium, Arima
August 5, 2024
13:00

Honduras	5–1	Belize
Sánchez 3', 33'; Farmer 31'; Ramírez 68'; Rodríguez 70'	Report	Perez 29'

Larry Gomes Stadium, Arima

August 6, 2024
11:00

Barbados	1–5	Honduras
T. Sutherland 23'	Report	Rodríguez 10', 35'; Farmer 32', 37'; Ramírez 40' (pen.)

Larry Gomes Stadium, Arima
August 6, 2024
15:00

Belize	0–1	Cuba
	Report	Rosales 57'

Larry Gomes Stadium, Arima

August 8, 2024
9:00

Honduras	2–2	Cuba
Rodríguez 59'; Ramírez 70+4'	Report	Marian 9'; López 42'

Larry Gomes Stadium, Arima
August 8, 2024
13:00

Barbados	2–3	Belize
	Report	Smith ??', ??'; Cal ??'

Larry Gomes Stadium, Arima

==== Group F ====
Pos	Team	Pld	W	D	L	GF	GA	GD	Pts	Qualification
1	Dominican Republic	3	3	0	0	7	1	+6	9	Knockout stage
2	Bermuda	3	2	0	1	4	4	0	6	
3	Cayman Islands	3	1	0	2	3	6	−3	3	
4	Suriname	3	0	0	3	4	7	−3	0	

Source: CONCACAF
Rules for classification: Tiebreakers
August 5, 2024
11:00

Dominican Republic	2–0	Cayman Islands
Asenjo 6', 35'	Report

Larry Gomes Stadium, Arima
August 5, 2024
15:00

Bermuda	2–1	Suriname
Welch 29', 35'	Report

Larry Gomes Stadium, Arima

August 6, 2024
9:00

Suriname	1–2	Dominican Republic
35+1'	Report	Moussa 32'; Bautista 39'

Larry Gomes Stadium, Arima
August 6, 2024
13:00

Cayman Islands	0–2	Bermuda
	Report	Welch 30'; Trott 40'

Larry Gomes Stadium, Arima

August 8, 2024
11:00

Cayman Islands	3–2	Suriname
	Report

Larry Gomes Stadium, Arima
August 8, 2024
15:00

Bermuda	0–3	Dominican Republic
	Report	Durán 23', 30'; Lainez 34'

Larry Gomes Stadium, Arima

=== Playoff stage ===
==== 15th place ====
August 9, 2024

Barbados	3–2	Grenada
??', ??'; Antoine 61'	Report	Fletcher 10', 30'

Hasely Crawford Stadium, Port of Spain

==== 11th place ====
August 9, 2024

Belize	2–1	Suriname
Smith 4', 16'	Report

Larry Gomes Stadium, Arima

==== 9th place ====
August 9, 2024

Trinidad High Performance (Trinidad and Tobago)	0–1	Cayman Islands
	Report	Solomon ??'

Larry Gomes Stadium, Arima

==== 7th place ====
August 9, 2024

Antigua and Barbuda	2–0	Curaçao
	Report

Larry Gomes Stadium, Arima

==== 5th place ====
August 9, 2024

Cuba	0–2	Bermuda
	Report	Samuels 17'; Gibbons-Thomas 45'

Larry Gomes Stadium, Arima

=== Bracket ===
Semi-finals
Trinidad and Tobago	0
Dominican Republic	1
Guatemala	0
Honduras	2

Final
Dominican Republic	0
Honduras	1
Third place
Trinidad and Tobago	3
Guatemala	0

==== Semifinals ====
August 9, 2024
09:00

Trinidad and Tobago	0–1	Dominican Republic
	Report	Lainez 70'

Hasely Crawford Stadium, Port of Spain
August 9, 2024
13:00

Guatemala	0–2	Honduras
	Report	Madrid 3'; Rodríguez 29'

Hasely Crawford Stadium, Port of Spain

==== Third place ====
August 11, 2024
09:00

Trinidad and Tobago	3–0	Guatemala
Wilson 12'; Herbert 45'; Guerero 63'	Report

Hasely Crawford Stadium, Port of Spain

==== Final ====
August 11, 2024
11:00

Dominican Republic	0–1	Honduras
	Report	Madrid 58'

Hasely Crawford Stadium, Port of Spain

== League C ==
=== First round ===
Pos	Team	Pld	W	D	L	GF	GA	GD	Pts	Qualification
1	Aruba	4	3	1	0	16	3	+13	10	Final
2	Saint Lucia	4	3	0	1	13	4	+9	9	Final
3	Turks and Caicos Islands	4	3	0	1	7	2	+5	9	Third place play-off
4	Guadeloupe	4	3	0	1	4	1	+3	9	Third place play-off
5	Guyana	4	2	1	1	5	2	+3	7	
6	French Guiana	4	2	1	1	9	7	+2	7	
7	Bonaire	4	2	0	2	6	5	+1	6	
8	Anguilla	4	1	1	2	3	2	+1	4	
9	Saint Vincent and the Grenadines	4	1	0	3	1	12	−11	3	
10	Aruba All Stars	4	0	0	4	0	12	−12	0	
11	Dominica	4	0	0	4	1	15	−14	0	

Source: CONCACAF
August 5, 2024
11:00

Dominica	1–3	French Guiana
Pascal ??'	Report

Trinidad Stadium, Oranjestad
August 5, 2024
13:00

Turks and Caicos Islands	2–1	Bonaire
Jeanty 32', 35'	Report	Alberto 15'

Trinidad Stadium, Oranjestad
August 5, 2024
15:00

Saint Lucia	0–2	Guadeloupe
	Report	Cuirassier ??', ??'

Trinidad Stadium, Oranjestad
August 5, 2024
17:00

Anguilla	3–0	Aruba All Stars
Z. Harrigan ??'; Gaskin ??'; K. Harrigan ??'	Report

Trinidad Stadium, Oranjestad
August 5, 2024
19:00

Aruba	5–0	Saint Vincent and the Grenadines
Breinburg ??'; Rogers ??', ??', ??'; Angela ??'	Report

Trinidad Stadium, Oranjestad

August 6, 2024
11:00

Guadeloupe	1–0	Turks and Caicos Islands
	Report

Trinidad Stadium, Oranjestad
August 6, 2024
13:00

Guyana	0–0	Anguilla
	Report

Trinidad Stadium, Oranjestad
August 6, 2024
15:00

Bonaire	4–0	Dominica
	Report

Trinidad Stadium, Oranjestad
August 6, 2024
17:00

Aruba All Stars	0–6	Saint Lucia
	Report	Marshal 8', 29'; Polius 13'; Richard 27'; Emmanuel 35+2', 37'

Trinidad Stadium, Oranjestad
August 6, 2024
19:00

French Guiana	2–2	Aruba
	Report

Trinidad Stadium, Oranjestad

August 7, 2024
17:00

Guyana	3–0	Saint Vincent and the Grenadines
Glean 39', 43'; Simon 70+1'	Report

Trinidad Stadium, Oranjestad
August 7, 2024
19:00

Aruba All Stars	0–2	French Guiana
	Report	Sida 9', 70+3'

Trinidad Stadium, Oranjestad

August 8, 2024
11:00

Anguilla	0–1	Bonaire
	Report	Alberto 70+4'

Trinidad Stadium, Oranjestad
August 8, 2024
13:00

Saint Lucia	4–2	French Guiana
Lionel 2'; Emmanuel ??', ??'	Report

Trinidad Stadium, Oranjestad
August 8, 2024
15:00

Turks and Caicos Islands	4–0	Saint Vincent and the Grenadines
Jeanty 19', 20', 27', 70'	Report

Trinidad Stadium, Oranjestad
August 8, 2024
17:00

Guyana	1–0	Guadeloupe
Glean 35+2'	Report

Trinidad Stadium, Oranjestad
August 8, 2024
19:00

Dominica	0–7	Aruba
	Report	Breinburg ??', ??'; Rogers ??', ??', ??'; Franken ??'; Angela ??'

Trinidad Stadium, Oranjestad

August 9, 2024
11:00

Turks and Caicos Islands	1–0	Aruba All Stars
Jeanty 31'	Report

Trinidad Stadium, Oranjestad
August 9, 2024
13:00

Saint Vincent and the Grenadines	1–0	Dominica
	Report

Trinidad Stadium, Oranjestad
August 9, 2024
15:00

Guadeloupe	1–0	Anguilla
Cuirassier 15'	Report

Trinidad Stadium, Oranjestad
August 9, 2024
17:00

Bonaire	0–3	Saint Lucia
	Report	Emmanuel 10', 70+3'; Joseph 68'

Trinidad Stadium, Oranjestad
August 9, 2024
19:00

Aruba	2–1	Guyana
Rogers 57', 65'	Report	Angela 35'

Trinidad Stadium, Oranjestad

=== Playoff stage ===
==== Third place ====
August 11, 2024

Turks and Caicos Islands	0–0	Guadeloupe
	Report
Penalties
	6–7

Trinidad Stadium, Oranjestad

==== Final ====
August 11, 2024

Aruba	2–1	Saint Lucia
Breinburg 27'; Rogers 70+6'	Report	Emmanuel 12'

Trinidad Stadium, Oranjestad
