= United States women's national under-17 soccer team =

United States Women's U-17
- Nickname(s): Team USA; The Stars and Stripes; The Yanks
- Association: United States Soccer Federation
- Confederation: CONCACAF (North America)
- Head coach: Ciara Crinion
- FIFA code: USA
First colors	Second colors

FIFA U-17 Women's World Cup
- Appearances: 8 (first in 2008)
- Best result: Runners-up (2008)

CONCACAF Women's U-17 Championship
- Appearances: 8 (first in 2008)
- Best result: Champions (2008, 2012, 2016, 2018, 2022, 2024)
Medal record
FIFA U-17 Women's World Cup
Silver medal – second place	2008 New Zealand
Bronze medal – third place	2024 Dominican Republic
CONCACAF Women's U-17 Championship
Gold medal – first place	2008 Trinidad and Tobago
Gold medal – first place	2012 Guatemala
Gold medal – first place	2016 Grenada
Gold medal – first place	2018 Nicaragua
Gold medal – first place	2022 Dominican Republic
Gold medal – first place	2024 Mexico
Bronze medal – third place	2010 Costa Rica
Bronze medal – third place	2013 Jamaica

The United States U-17 women's national soccer team is a youth soccer team operated under the auspices of U.S. Soccer. Its primary role is the development of players in preparation for the senior national team. The team's most recent major tournament was the 2024 FIFA U-17 Women's World Cup, in which the United States team won bronze. The team competes in a variety of competitions, including the biennial FIFA U-17 Women's World Cup, which is the top competition for this age group.

== History ==
=== 2002–2005 ===
The women's U-17 program was started in 2002 and was initially focused on developing players for the U-19 team. The U-17s played their first matches in November 2002, including a 3–0 victory over Scotland. Through 2003, the U-17s went undefeated in international matches, defeating youth teams from Canada and Germany, and repeated that feat in 2004. In 2005, however, the U-17s suffered defeats in matches against the Canadian and Mexican youth teams.

In 2006, the U-17s competed against various youth teams from Argentina and Germany, including a loss to Argentina's senior team.

=== 2007–2008 ===
In February 2007, FIFA began organizing for the inaugural FIFA U-17 Women's World Cup in New Zealand. In preparation for the tournament, the U-17s posted a 9–1–0 record, defeating U-17 teams from Germany and Uruguay and U-19 teams from Denmark, England and Argentina.

In 2008, the U-17s compiled a record of 19–3–2 and 11–2–1 in international matches, winning the CONCACAF Women's U-17 Championship in Trinidad and Tobago on July 26, 2008, defeating Costa Rica 4–1.

At the 2008 FIFA U-17 Women's World Cup, the United States lost their opening match to Japan. They scraped through the opening rounds of play with a draw against France, and advanced through the tournament to the final, where they lost in overtime to North Korea. Taylor Vancil was named the best goalkeeper at the tournament. Out of the 13 goals that the US had at the tournament, only three players actually scored them: Vicki DiMartino (5), Courtney Verloo (4), and Kristie Mewis (2). The other two goals were own goals by Paraguay and North Korea.

=== 2009–2010 ===
The U-17s were favored to win the 2010 CONCACAF Women's U-17 Championship held in Costa Rica, winning their group and scoring 32 goals. However, they suffered a stunning loss to Canada in the semifinals, on a penalty shootout. This loss prevented the United States from qualifying to the 2010 FIFA U-17 Women's World Cup, the first time in history that a United States women's national soccer team has not advanced out of their region to a Women's World Cup.

=== 2011–2012 ===
In 2011, Albertin Montoya took over the U-17 squad, intent on developing a more possession style of play. The team started out the cycle slow against powerhouses Germany and Japan, going 1–1–2 in a set of friendlies, but eventually found their form and dominated the 2012 CONCACAF Women's U-17 Championship, outscoring their opposition 26–0 on their way to winning the tournament and qualifying for the 2012 FIFA U-17 Women's World Cup. Summer Green set a record with 12 goals, the most by an American player during any CONCACAF qualifying tournament.

However, the World Cup would not be kind to the Americans, as despite not losing a match, they would not make it out of their group. A series of draws between the US, eventual runners-up France, and North Korea meant that the two teams to advance would be decided by total goal differential against the fourth team in the group, Gambia. The US's 6–0 win turned out not to be enough when North Korea sat deep in their own half to protect a draw, knowing they had scored 11 goals on Gambia, and France, knowing it was on the brink of elimination, pressed the outmatched Gambians to score 6 times in the final 20 minutes to turn a 4–2 match in the 70th minute into a 10–2 rout.

=== 2013–2014 ===
In 2013, B. J. Snow took over the U-17 squad for the 2014 World Cup cycle. The cycle started out with great hope and expectations, but in a manner almost identical to 4 years before, the US saw itself unable to qualify for the 2014 FIFA U-17 Women's World Cup when they lost in the semifinals of the 2013 CONCACAF Women's U-17 Championship to Mexico in a penalty shootout despite having only given up one goal in the entire tournament.

== Competitive record ==
=== FIFA U-17 Women's World Cup ===
Year	Result	Matches	Wins	Draws	Losses	GF	GA
(New Zealand) 2008	Runners-up	6	3	1	2	13	10
(Trinidad and Tobago) 2010	Did not qualify						
(Azerbaijan) 2012	Group stage	3	1	2	0	7	1
(Costa Rica) 2014	Did not qualify						
(Jordan) 2016	Group stage	3	1	0	2	9	6
(Uruguay) 2018	Group stage	3	1	0	2	3	7
(India) 2022	Quarter-finals	4	2	2	0	14	2
(Dominican Republic) 2024	Third place	6	4	0	2	13	4
(Morocco) 2025	Round of 16	4	3	1	0	14	3
(Morocco) 2026	Quarter-finals	5	3	0	2	27	8
(Morocco) 2027	To be determined						
(Morocco) 2028	To be determined						
(Morocco) 2029	To be determined						
Total	8/13	34	18	6	10	100	41

=== CONCACAF Women's U-17 Championship / World Cup qualification ===
CONCACAF Women's U-17 Championship record
Year	Result	Matches	Wins	Draws	Losses	GF	GA
(Trinidad and Tobago) 2008	Champions	5	5	0	0	29	2
(Costa Rica) 2010	Third place	5	4	1	0	38	0
(Guatemala) 2012	Champions	5	5	0	0	26	0
(Jamaica) 2013	Third place	5	4	1	0	26	1
(Grenada) 2016	Champions	5	5	0	0	18	2
(Nicaragua) (United States) 2018	Champions	5	5	0	0	21	5
(Mexico) 2020	Cancelled due to COVID-19 pandemic						
(Dominican Republic) 2022	Champions	7	7	0	0	58	1
(Mexico) 2024	Champions	5	5	0	0	32	2
Total	8/9	42	40	2	0	248	13
CONCACAF U-17 Women's World Cup qualification
(Mexico) (Nicaragua) (Trinidad and Tobago) 2025	Group C winners	3	3	0	0	17	0
(Costa Rica) 2026	Group B winners	3	3	0	0	32	0
Total	2/2	6	6	0	0	49	0

== Fixtures and results ==
The following is a list of match results in the last 12 months, as well as any future matches that have been scheduled.

Legend Win Draw Lose Fixture

=== 2025 ===
October 18 FIFA U-17 Women's World Cup GS	United States	3–0	Ecuador	Salé, Morocco
20:00	Brewer 19'; Touray 41'; Malsom 45'	Report		Stadium: Mohammed VI Football Academy (Pitch 3); Attendance: 555; Referee: Alina Peșu (Romania)

October 21 FIFA U-17 Women's World Cup GS	United States	5–2	China	Salé, Morocco
17:00	Malsom 27', 68'; DiMaria 44'; Touray 45+3', 62'	Report	Zhou Xinyi 12'; Zeng Yijie 85'	Stadium: Mohammed VI Football Academy (Pitch 3); Attendance: 800; Referee: Charly Straub (Brazil)

October 24 FIFA U-17 Women's World Cup GS	Norway	0–5	United States	Salé, Morocco
14:00		Report	Ream 6'; Kocher 49'; Touray 63'; Whitham 64'; Johnson 80'	Stadium: Mohammed VI Football Academy (Pitch 3); Attendance: 500; Referee: Milagros Arruela (Peru)

October 28 FIFA U-17 Women's World Cup R16	United States	1–1 (6–7 p)	Netherlands	Salé, Morocco
16:30	Johnson 57'	Report	Pennock 3'	Stadium: Mohammed VI Football Academy (Pitch 1); Attendance: 750; Referee: Alina Peșu (Romania)
	Penalties
	Schmidt (penalty scored); Malsom (penalty scored); Johnson (penalty scored); Cecil (penalty scored); Ream (penalty scored); Touray (penalty scored); Sadler (penalty missed)		(penalty scored) Renfurm; (penalty scored) Hubert; (penalty scored) Thomassen; (penalty scored) Vinckers; (penalty scored) Dap; (penalty scored) Pennock; (penalty scored) Van der Vliet

=== 2026 ===
January 11 friendly	Germany	2–2	United States	La Nucia, Alicante, Spain
	Choisy 46'; Kuhn 76'	Report	Stanislaus 25'; Manning 41'	Stadium: Club Deportivo Sporting Fútbol Sala La Nucia

January 14 friendly	Denmark	0–3	United States	La Nucia, Spain
		Report	Ahrens 47'; Paletta 83'; Sanislaus 89'	Stadium: Camilo Cano Stadium

February 9 MIMA Cup – First Round	Wales	0–5	United States	San Pedro del Pinatar, Spain
		Report	Morrell 24', 56'; Paletta 45+3'; Manning 59'; Aguilar 81'	Stadium: Pinatar Arena; Attendance: 70; Referee: Andrea Firvida

February 12 MIMA Cup – Semi–finals	Morocco	0–5	United States	San Pedro del Pinatar, Spain
		Report	Ahrens 67'; Paletta 71'; DiMaria 75', 83', 87'	Stadium: Pinatar Arena; Attendance: 80; Referee: Pedro Segura (SPA)

February 14 MIMA Cup – Final	England	Canceled	United States	San Pedro del Pinatar, Spain
				Stadium: Pinatar Arena

March 17 CONCACAF World Cup qualification	United States	19–0	Bermuda	Alajuela, Costa Rica
12:30 pm (14:30 UTC−6)	Stanislaus 3', 17', 53', 58'; Manning 5', 8'; Morrell 27', 39', 56'; Corona 47'; DiMaria 49', 52'; Paletta 59'; Whitham 69', 78', 86'; Aguilar 83'; Heathcock 84'; Hanf 87'	Report		Stadium: Proyecto Goal FCRF Cancha 2 Referee: Minely Ureña (Dominican Republic)

March 19 CONCACAF World Cup qualification	Haiti	0–9	United States	Alajuela, Costa Rica
17:00 pm (15:00 UTC−6)		Report	Mallebranche 5' (o.g.); Murray 8'; Aguilar 25', 45+1', 52'; Whitham 57'; Paletta 62'; Stanislaus 79', 81'	Stadium: Proyecto Goal FCRF Cancha 2 Attendance: 237; Referee: Marjorie Ponce (Nicaragua)

March 22 CONCACAF World Cup qualification	United States	4–0	Puerto Rico	Alajuela, Costa Rica
12:06 pm (10:06 UTC−6)	DiMaria 22' (pen.); Corona 36'; Whitham 50'; Morrell 55'	Report		Stadium: Proyecto Goal FCRF Cancha 1 Attendance: 174; Referee: Marjorie Ponce (Nicaragua)

July 3 Friendly	Japan	5–3	United States	Chiba, Japan
	Higuchi 10'; Hanashiro 47'; Ito 50'; Matsushita 51'; Hanashiro 67'	Report	DiMaria 12'; DiMaria 14'; Whitham 90+4'	Stadium: Prince Takamado Memorial JFA YUME Field; Attendance: 120; Referee: Misa Chiba (Japan)

July 6 Friendly	Japan	2–1	United States	Chiba, Japan
	Williams 69' (o.g.); Hanashiro 74'	Report	Hanf 22'	Stadium: Prince Takamado Memorial JFA YUME Field; Attendance: 90; Referee: Yurina Tazawa (Japan)

August 13 friendlies	United States	1–1	Mexico	Fayetteville, Georgia
	Manning 59'	Report	Carmona 67'	Stadium: U.S. Soccer National Training Center; Referee: Lila Remache (USA)

August 17 friendlies	United States	1–0	Chile	Fayetteville, Georgia
	Stanislaus 65'	Report		Stadium: U.S. Soccer National Training Center; Referee: Christopher Haggerty (USA)

August 20 friendlies	United States	4–1	Canada	Fayetteville, Georgia
	Manning 4'; DiMaria 39', 41', 55'	Report	Hennessy 9'	Stadium: U.S. Soccer National Training Center; Referee: Robert Benge (USA)

October 19 FIFA U-17 Women's World Cup GS	United States	17–0	Samoa	Salé, Morocco
18:00	DiMaria 2', 18', 20', 30', 70', 73'; Corona 12'; Paletta 25', 37'; Murray 28'; Manning 45+4'; Stanislaus 57'; Reyna 64', 78'; Ortiz 75'; Brewer 87'; Hanf 90'	Report		Stadium: Mohammed VI Football Academy (Pitch 3); Attendance: 682; Referee: Zoulaikha Harmasse (Morocco)

October 22 FIFA U-17 Women's World Cup GS	United States	6–1	Kenya	Salé, Morocco
18:00	DiMaria 5', 22', 35' (pen.), 45+2' (pen.); Paletta 48'; Hanf 90+3'	Report	Atieno 90+5'	Stadium: Mohammed VI Football Academy (Pitch 3); Attendance: 279; Referee: Oh Hyeon-jeong (South Korea)

October 25 FIFA U-17 Women's World Cup GS	China	3–2	United States	Salé, Morocco
18:00	Liu Yuxi 7', 81'; Zhao Jiayi 71'	Report	DiMaria 69'; Ortiz 90+7'	Stadium: Mohammed VI Football Academy (Pitch 3); Attendance: 1,316; Referee: Lara Lee (Australia)

October 29 FIFA U-17 Women's World Cup R16	Spain	1–2	United States	Salé, Morocco
18:00	Molina 71'	Report	Stanislaus 43'; DiMaria 45+3'	Stadium: Mohammed VI Football Academy (Pitch 4); Attendance: 462; Referee: Dong Fangyu (China)

November 1 FIFA U-17 Women's World Cup QF	North Korea	3–0	United States	Salé, Morocco
15:00	Ri Ui-gyong 30', 56'; Ri Ye-rim 45+4'	Report		Stadium: Mohammed VI Football Academy (Pitch 2); Attendance: 166; Referee: Lara Lee (Australia)

== Players ==
=== Current squad ===
21 players were called up for to represent U.S. at the 2026 FIFA U-17 Women's World Cup.

Caps and goals are current as of 22 March 2026 after match against Japan.

No.	Pos.	Player	Date of birth (age)	Caps	Goals	Club
1	GK	Avellina Saunders	1 December 2010 (aged 15)	10	0	(United States Soccer Federation) Utah Royals FC Arizona
12	GK	Alexis Fischer	10 February 2009 (aged 17)	3	0	(United States Soccer Federation) Eclipse Select SC
21	GK	Kathy Long Capell	31 August 2009 (aged 17)	2	0	(United States Soccer Federation) Crossfire Premier SC
2	DF	Gigi Zuniga	November 12, 2010 (aged 15)	11	0	(United States Soccer Federation) Mountain View Los Altos SC
3	DF	Madeline Maves	16 February 2009 (aged 17)	11	0	(United States Soccer Federation) Crossfire Premier SC
4	DF	Kendra Hansen	4 April 2009 (aged 17)	14	0	(United States Soccer Federation) Pateadores SC
5	DF	Meila Brewer	24 March 2009 (aged 17)	19	2	(United States Soccer Federation) Dallas Trinity FC
6	DF	Anaiah Williams	November 28, 2009 (aged 16)	14	0	(United States Soccer Federation) Eclipse Select SC
13	DF	Venina Moodie	25 May 2009 (aged 17)	12	0	(United States Soccer Federation) De Anza Force SC
15	DF	Cassie Travers	10 February 2010 (aged 16)	3	0	(United States Soccer Federation) Gotham FC U-18
8	MF	Loradana Paletta	13 January 2011 (aged 15)	18	8	(United States Soccer Federation) New York City FC
10	MF	Mia Corona	8 February 2009 (aged 17)	14	3	(United States Soccer Federation) UCLA
16	MF	Grace Murray	10 August 2009 (aged 17)	13	2	(United States Soccer Federation) Beach FC
18	MF	Jordyn Heathcock	27 December 2009 (aged 16)	13	1	(United States Soccer Federation) FC Dallas
20	MF	Isabella Ortiz	8 January 2010 (aged 16)	8	2	(United States Soccer Federation) Florida United SC
7	FW	Maddie DiMaria	16 February 2009 (aged 17)	23	24	(United States Soccer Federation) St. Louis Scott Gallagher SC
9	FW	Deus Stanislaus	29 January 2009 (aged 17)	17	11	(United States Soccer Federation) UNC
11	FW	Amari Manning	8 January 2009 (aged 17)	17	7	(United States Soccer Federation) UNC
14	FW	Jordyn Sullivan	27 May 2009 (aged 17)	7	0	(United States Soccer Federation) Match Fit Surf Academy
17	FW	Carolina Reyna		10	2	(United States Soccer Federation) FC Westlake
19	FW	Gianna Hanf	18 October 2009 (aged 16)	13	4	(United States Soccer Federation) Match Fit Surf Academy

=== Recent call-ups ===
The following players have been called up in the past 12 months.

- August 2026 friendlies
- July friendlies
- CONCACAF World Cup qualification
- MIMA Cup
- January 2026 friendlies
- November 2025 training camp
- 2025 FIFA U-17 Women's World Cup

Pos.	Player	Date of birth (age)	Caps	Goals	Club	Latest call-up
GK	Avellina Saunders	(15)	6	0	(United States) Utah Royals FC Arizona	August 2026 friendlies
GK	Alexis Fischer	February 10, 2009 (age 17)	3	0	(United States) Eclipse Select SC	August 2026 friendlies
GK	Kathy Long Capell	(16)	1	0	(United States) Crossfire Academy	August 2026 friendlies
GK	Lola-Iris Ta	November 13, 2009 (age 16)	2	0	(United States) FC Dallas	July friendlies
GK	Ella McNeal	July 20, 2009 (age 17)	1	0	(United States) St. Louis Scott Gallagher SC	MIMA Cup
GK	Anneliese Braun	November 28, 2009 (age 16)	0	0	(United States) Mountain View Los Altos SC	November 2025 training camp
GK	Evan O'Steen	March 22, 2008 (aged 17)	13	0	(United States) Florida State Seminoles	2025 FIFA U-17 Women's World Cup
GK	Peyton Trayer	March 11, 2008 (aged 17)	7	0	(United States) Slammers HB Køge	2025 FIFA U-17 Women's World Cup
GK	Ella McNeal	July 20, 2009 (aged 16)	0	0	(United States) St. Louis Scott Gallagher SC	2025 FIFA U-17 Women's World Cup
DF	Venina Moodie	(16)	8	0	(United States) De Anza Force SC	August 2026 friendlies
DF	Carolyn Voss	(16)	1	0	(United States) Minnesota Thunder	August 2026 friendlies
DF	Meila Brewer	March 24, 2009 (aged 16)	14	1	(United States) UCLA Bruins	August 2026 friendlies
DF	Madeline Maves	February 16, 2009 (age 17)	9	0	(United States) Crossfire Premier SC	August 2026 friendlies
DF	Kendra Hansen	April 4, 2009 (age 17)	9	0	(United States) Pateadores SC	August 2026 friendlies
DF	Cassie Travers	(15)	1	0	(United States) Mountain View Los Altos SC	August 2026 friendlies
DF	Anaiah Williams	November 28, 2009 (age 16)	10	0	(United States) Eclipse Select SC	August 2026 friendlies
DF	Georgia Restovich	(16)	4	0	(United States) Vanderbilt	August 2026 friendlies
DF	Gigi Zuniga	(15)	9	0	(United States) Mountain View Los Altos SC	July friendlies
DF	Elena Vera	(16)	2	0	(United States) Bay Area Surf SC	July friendlies
DF	Sophia Ahrens	November 28, 2009 (age 16)	6	2	(United States) St. Louis Scott Gallagher	CONCACAF World Cup qualification
DF	Sam Ogden	November 28, 2009 (age 16)	3	0	(United States) Kansas City Current II	CONCACAF World Cup qualification
DF	Camille Toussant	December 18, 2009 (age 16)	0	0	(United States) Louisiana TDP Elite	November 2025 training camp
DF	Cali O'Neill	January 16, 2008 (aged 17)	8	0	(United States) NC Courage Academy	2025 FIFA U-17 Women's World Cup
DF	Sydney Schmidt	January 25, 2008 (aged 17)	12	2	(United States) North Carolina Courage	2025 FIFA U-17 Women's World Cup
DF	Pearl Cecil	January 24, 2008 (aged 17)	14	1	(United States) Virginia Cavaliers	2025 FIFA U-17 Women's World Cup
DF	Olivia Robinson	April 30, 2008 (aged 17)	1	0	(United States) STA Soccer Academy	2025 FIFA U-17 Women's World Cup
DF	Natalie Chudowsky	February 14, 2008 (aged 17)	7	1	(United States) New York Soccer Club	2025 FIFA U-17 Women's World Cup
DF	Claire Kessenger^{PRE}	April 29, 2009 (age 17)	4	0	(Spain) CE Europa Femenino	2025 FIFA U-17 Women's World Cup
MF	Grace Murray	August 10, 2009 (age 17)	8	1	(United States) Beach FC	August 2026 friendlies
MF	Isabella Ortiz	(15)	3	0	(United States) Florida United Soccer Club	August 2026 friendlies
MF	Caroline Swann	November 26, 2009 (age 16)	3	0	(United States) D'Feeters Kicks SC	August 2026 friendlies
MF	Jordyn Heathcock	December 27, 2009 (age 16)	8	1	(United States) FC Dallas	August 2026 friendlies
MF	Bridget Kopmeyer	(16)	4	0	(United States) Michigan Tigers	August 2026 friendlies
MF	Gabrielle Ferraro	May 1, 2009 (age 17)	2	0	(United States) San Juan SC	August 2026 friendlies
MF	Loradana Paletta	January 13, 2011 (age 15)	16	5	(United States) New York City FC	July 2026 friendlies
MF	Mia Corona	February 8, 2009 (age 17)	9	2	(United States) Legends FC	July friendlies
MF	Taylor Morrell	September 30, 2009 (age 17)	6	6	(United States) VDA	July friendlies
MF	Khari Hontz	(16)	2	0	(United States) KC Current II	July friendlies
MF	Elena Vera	October 3, 2009 (age 17)	5	0	(United States) Bay Area Surf SC	CONCACAF World Cup qualification
MF	Lilah Helwig	May 5, 2009 (age 17)	2	0	(United States) FC Delco	MIMA Cup
MF	Scottie Antonucci	January 4, 2008 (aged 17)	11	1	(United States) Legends FC	2025 FIFA U-17 Women's World Cup
MF	Nyanya Touray	July 25, 2008 (aged 17)	12	7	(United States) Florida State Seminoles	2025 FIFA U-17 Women's World Cup
MF	Chloe Sadler	December 9, 2008 (aged 16)	14	1	(United States) La Roca FC	2025 FIFA U-17 Women's World Cup
MF	Jaiden Rodriguez	May 27, 2008 (aged 17)	18	3	(United States) USC Trojans	2025 FIFA U-17 Women's World Cup
MF	Riley Kennedy	June 15, 2008 (aged 17)	7	1	(United States) North Carolina Tar Heels	2025 FIFA U-17 Women's World Cup
FW	Amari Manning	January 8, 2009 (age 17)	12	6	(United States) PDA	August 2026 friendlies
FW	Madeline DiMaria	February 16, 2009 (age 17)	12	11	(United States) St. Louis Scott Gallagher SC	August 2026 friendlies
FW	Jordyn Sullivan	(16)	5	0	(United States) PDA	August 2026 friendlies
FW	Deus Stanislaus	January 29, 2009 (age 17)	12	9	(United States) UNC	August 2026 friendlies
FW	Tatum Gardner	(15)	8	1	(United States) Arizona Arsenal SC	August 2026 friendlies
FW	Carolina Reyna	(17)	5	0	(United States) Sting Austin	August 2026 friendlies
FW	Gianna Hanf	October 18, 2009 (age 17)	9	2	(United States) Match Fit Academy	July friendlies
FW	Mak Whitham	July 27, 2010 (age 16)	9	8	(United States) Gotham FC	July friendlies
FW	Giselle Aguilar	(16)	7	5	(United States) Solar SC	July friendlies
FW	Alexia Hansen	November 28, 2009 (age 16)	2	0	(United States) FC Prime	MIMA Cup
FW	Kylie Berk	November 8, 2009 (age 16)	0	0	(United States) Penn Fusion SA	November 2025 training camp
FW	Anna Korney	December 31, 2008 (age 17)	0	0	(United States) Pittsburgh Riverhounds Academy	November 2025 training camp
FW	Lauren Malsom	March 14, 2008 (aged 17)	9	4	(United States) North Carolina Tar Heels	2025 FIFA U-17 Women's World Cup
FW	Maddie DiMaria	February 16, 2009 (aged 16)	4	1	(United States) St. Louis Scott Gallagher SC	2025 FIFA U-17 Women's World Cup
FW	Anastasia Showler-Little	December 4, 2008 (aged 16)	5	0	(United States) PDA	2025 FIFA U-17 Women's World Cup
FW	Micayla Johnson	January 18, 2008 (aged 17)	16	8	(United States) Chicago Stars FC	2025 FIFA U-17 Women's World Cup
FW	KK Ream	July 8, 2009 (aged 16)	4	1	(United States) Utah Royals	2025 FIFA U-17 Women's World Cup
FW	Ellie Kocher	August 5, 2008 (aged 17)	8	1	(United States) Penn Fusion	2025 FIFA U-17 Women's World Cup
FW	Addison Feldman^{PRE}	December 8, 2008 (age 17)	7	0	(United States) Utah Celtic FC	2025 FIFA U-17 Women's World Cup

- INJ - Injured
- PRE - Withdrew prior to camp

== Coaches ==
- (United States) Erica Walsh (2004–2006)
- (United States) Kazbek Tambi (2006–2010)
- (United States) Michael Dickey (2010–2011)
- (United States) Albertin Montoya (2011–2012)
- (United States) B. J. Snow (2013–2017)
- (England) Mark Carr (2017–2018)
- (England) Tracey Kevins (2019–2021)
- (Spain) Natalia Astrain (2021–2023)
- (United States) Katie Schoepfer (2023–2025)
- (United States) Ciara Crinion (2025–present)

== Head-to-head record ==
The following table shows United States' head-to-head record in the FIFA U-17 Women's World Cup.

Opponent	Pld	W	D	L	GF	GA	GD	Win %
Brazil	1	0	1	0	1	1	+0	0.00
Cameroon	1	1	0	0	3	0	+3	100.00
China	2	1	0	1	7	5	+2	50.00
Colombia	1	1	0	0	2	0	+2	100.00
Ecuador	1	1	0	0	3	0	+3	100.00
England	1	1	0	0	3	0	+3	100.00
France	2	0	2	0	1	1	+0	0.00
Gambia	1	1	0	0	6	0	+6	100.00
Germany	2	1	0	1	2	5	−3	50.00
Ghana	1	0	0	1	1	2	−1	0.00
India	1	1	0	0	8	0	+8	100.00
Japan	2	0	0	2	4	6	−2	0.00
Kenya	1	1	0	0	6	1	+5	100.00
Morocco	1	1	0	0	4	0	+4	100.00
Netherlands	1	0	1	0	1	1	+0	0.00
Nigeria	2	1	1	0	3	1	+2	50.00
North Korea	5	0	1	4	2	10	−8	0.00
Norway	1	1	0	0	5	0	+5	100.00
Paraguay	2	2	0	0	9	2	+7	100.00
Samoa	1	1	0	0	17	0	+17	100.00
South Korea	2	2	0	0	9	2	+7	100.00
Spain	2	1	0	1	3	4	−1	50.00
Total	34	18	6	10	100	41	+59	52.94

== See also ==
- United States women's national soccer team
- United States women's national under-20 soccer team
