= CONCACAF Girls' Under-15 Championship =

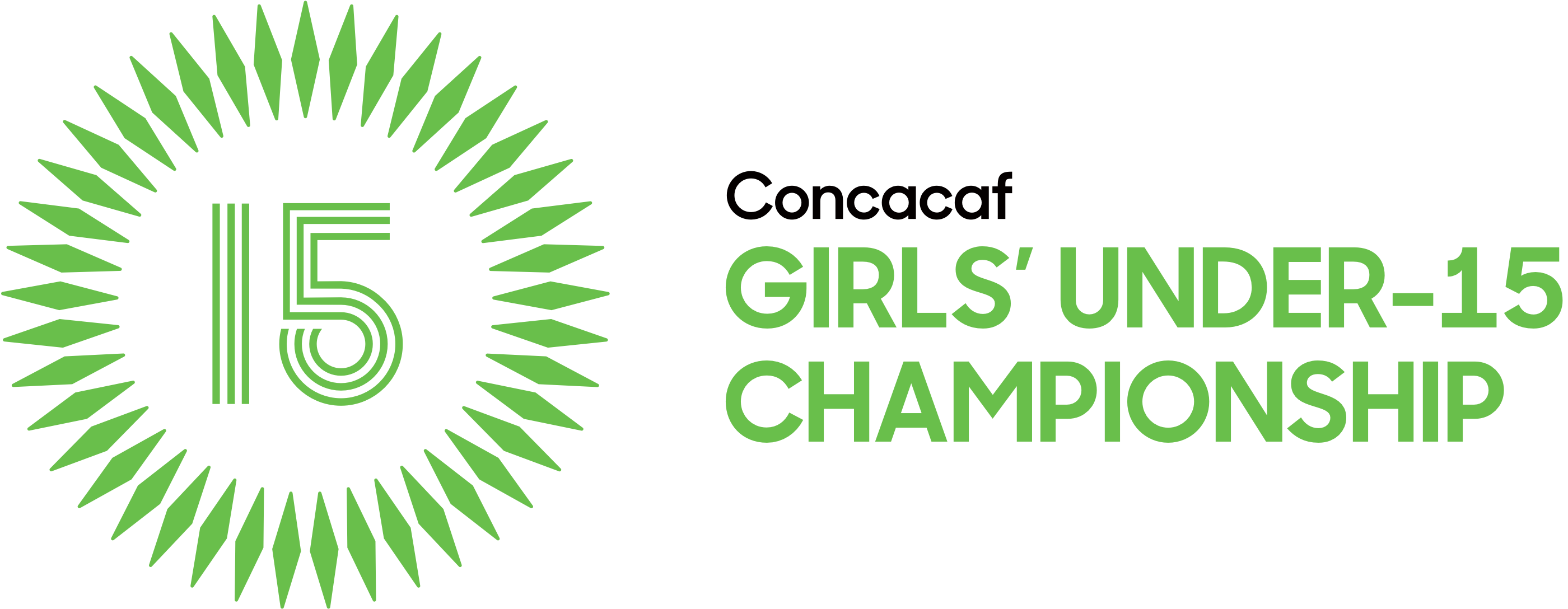
- Organizer(s): CONCACAF
- Founded: 2014
- Region: North America
- Current champion(s): United States (4th title)
- Most championships: United States (4 titles)
- Website: CONCACAF Official
- 2024 CONCACAF Girls' U-15 Championship

CONCACAF Girls' Under-15 Championship is a CONCACAF football competition.

The competition took place for the first time in 2014, with subsequent tournaments being held every two years.

== Results ==
Year	Host	Champions	Runners-up	3rd Place	4th Place
CONCACAF Girls' Under-15 Championship
2014; Details	Cayman Islands	Canada	Haiti	Trinidad and Tobago	Honduras
2016; Details	United States	United States	Canada	Mexico	Costa Rica
2018; Details	United States	United States	Mexico	Costa Rica; Portugal	
2020	Postponed due to COVID-19 pandemic				
2022; Details	United States	United States	Canada	Mexico	Dominican Republic
2024; Details	Costa Rica	United States	Mexico	Canada	Costa Rica

== Successful teams ==
Team	Champions	Runners-up	Third place	Fourth place
United States	4 (2016, 2018, 2022, 2024)	–	–	–
Canada	1 (2014)	2 (2016, 2022)	1 (2024)	–
Mexico	–	2 (2018, 2024)	2 (2016, 2022)	–
Haiti	–	1 (2014)	–	–
Costa Rica	–	–	1 (2018)	2 (2016, 2024)
Portugal	–	–	1 (2018)	–
Trinidad and Tobago	–	–	1 (2014)	–
Dominican Republic	–	–	–	1 (2022)
Honduras	–	–	–	1 (2014)

== Awards ==
=== Golden Boot ===
Year	Player	Goals
2014	(Cayman Islands) Chelsea Green (Haiti) Nérilia Mondésir	6
2016	(United States) Payton Linnehan	8
2018	(Saint Kitts and Nevis) Ellie Stokes	6
2022	(United States Virgin Islands) Gabriella Quezada	9
2024	(United States) Carolina Reyna	6

=== Golden Ball ===
Year	Player
2014	(Canada) Sarah Stratigakis
2016	(United States) Mia Fishel
2018	(United States) Jaedyn Shaw
2022	(United States) Kennedy Fuller
2024	(United States) Caroline Swann

=== Golden Glove ===
Year	Player
2014	(Canada) Lysianne Proulx
2016	(United States) Ruth Jones
2018	(Mexico) Azul Álvarez

=== CONCACAF Fair Play Award ===
Year	Team
2014	Honduras
2016	Mexico
2018	Portugal
2022	United States
2024	Mexico
