= United States girls' national under-15 soccer team =

Girl's national under-15 soccer team representing the United States

United States Under-15 Girls
- Association: United States Soccer Federation
- Confederation: CONCACAF
- Sub-confederation: NAFU (North America)
- Head coach: Vanessa Mann
- FIFA code: USA
First colors	Second colors

CONCACAF Girls' Under-15 Championship
- Appearances: 4 (first in 2016)
- Best result: Champions (2016, 2018, 2022, 2024)
Medal record
CONCACAF Girls' Under-15 Championship
Gold medal – first place	2016 United States
Gold medal – first place	2018 United States
Gold medal – first place	2022 United States
Gold medal – first place	2024 Costa Rica

The United States U-15 girls national soccer team represents the United States in tournaments and friendly matches at the under-15 level. They have appeared and won four CONCACAF Girls' Under-15 Championships, in 2016, 2018, 2022 and 2024.

== Competitive record ==
Champions Runners-up Third place Fourth place

=== CONCACAF Girls' Under-15 Championship ===
CONCACAF Girls' Under-15 Championship
Year	Result	Pos	Pld	W	D	L	F	A
(Cayman Islands) 2014	Did not participate							
(United States) 2016	Champions	1st	7	7	0	0	49	0
(United States) 2018	Champions	1st	5	4	0	1	22	2
2020	Postponed due to COVID-19 pandemic							
(United States) 2022	Champions	1st	5	5	0	0	31	0
(Costa Rica) 2024	Champions	1st	5	5	0	0	31	1
Total	4 Titles		22	21	0	1	133	3

== Results and schedule ==
The following is a list of match results in the last 12 months, as well as any future matches that have been scheduled.

Legend

Win Draw Lose Fixture

=== 2026 ===
April 26, 2026 Friendly	England	2–4	United States	Burton upon Trent, England
		Report	Vassor; Winters; Sadlowski; Jones	Stadium: St George's Park

April 28, 2026 Friendly	England	0–4	United States	Burton upon Trent, England
		Report	Jones 21'; Bhuta 65'; Winters 81', 88'	Stadium: St George's Park; Referee: Katie Allen (ENG)

May 20, 2026 Friendly	Netherlands	4–1	United States	Oldenzaal, Netherlands
	Ennahachi 20'; Gussinklo 29', 30', 36'	Report	Rodriguez 69'	Stadium: Sportpark Vondersweijde; Referee: Daan Schraper (NED)

May 24, 2026 Friendly	Germany	2–1	United States	Lingen, Germany
	Sabmannshausen 6'; Doganer 40+3' (pen.)	Report	Skalski 36'	Stadium: VFL Lingen e.V. Referee: Antonia Tucholski (German Football AssociationGER)

== Players ==
=== Current squad ===
24 players were called up for the September 2026 training camp.

Caps and goals are current as of April 28, 2026 after match against England.

No.	Pos.	Player	Date of birth (age)	Caps	Goals	Club
	GK	Harper Gage	(14)	0	0	(United States Soccer Federation) Solar SC
	GK	Hadley Winn	(14)	0	0	(United States Soccer Federation) Crossfire Premier SC
	GK	Sadie Widlansky	(14)	0	0	(United States Soccer Federation) Athletic Club Florida
	DF	Camilla Argote	(14)	0	0	(United States Soccer Federation) Players Development Academy
	DF	Rowen Briggs	(14)	0	0	(United States Soccer Federation) Richmond United SC
	DF	Kensie Cabral	(14)	0	0	(United States Soccer Federation) San Diego Surf SC
	DF	Hailey Cook	(14)	0	0	(United States Soccer Federation) Slammers FC HB Koge
	DF	Avery Decker	(14)	0	0	(United States Soccer Federation) Ohio Premier SC
	DF	Sullivan Frericks	(14)	0	0	(United States Soccer Federation) Tennessee SC
	DF	Sereen Papp	(14)	0	0	(United States Soccer Federation) San Francisco Elite Academy
	DF	Naiany Zuniga	(14)	0	0	(United States Soccer Federation) Eagles SC
	MF	Blakely Bickerstaff	(14)	0	0	(United States Soccer Federation) Michigan Hawks
	MF	Ariah Dominguez	(14)	0	0	(United States Soccer Federation) San Diego Surf SC
	MF	Morgan Douce	(14)	0	0	(United States Soccer Federation) Ohio Premier SC
	MF	Stella Fallis	(14)	0	0	(United States Soccer Federation) San Diego Surf SC
	MF	Maya Henry	(14)	0	0	(United States Soccer Federation) Solar SC
	MF	Andrea Lopes	(14)	0	0	(United States Soccer Federation) Players Development Academy
	MF	Sophie Ortiz	(14)	0	0	(United States Soccer Federation) Solar SC
	FW	Brooke Chavez	(14)	0	0	(United States Soccer Federation) North Carolina Courage Academy
	FW	Fifi Garcia	(14)	0	0	(United States Soccer Federation) Southern California Blues SC
	FW	Aubrey Griffin	(14)	0	0	(United States Soccer Federation) Concorde Fire Premier
	FW	Haylie Jackson	(14)	0	0	(United States Soccer Federation) San Diego Surf SC
	FW	Zara Mantilla	(14)	0	0	(United States Soccer Federation) Athletic Club Florida
	FW	Ryanne Taylor	(14)	0	0	(United States Soccer Federation) FC Dallas Academy

=== Recent call-ups ===
The following players were called up in the past 12 months.

- June 2026 training camp.
- May 2026 friendlies.
- April 2026 friendlies.
- November 2025 training camp.

Pos.	Player	Date of birth (age)	Caps	Goals	Club	Latest call-up
GK	Traci Byers	(14)	0	0	(United States) Penn Fusion SA	June 2026 training camp
GK	Gwyneth Provost	(14)	0	0	(United States) Indy Premier SC	June 2026 training camp
GK	Sophia Thompson	(14)	1	0	(United States) Rockford Raptors FC	June 2026 training camp
GK	Olivia Devaux	(14)	2	0	(United States) HTX	May 2026 friendlies
GK	Zoe Hanohano	(14)	2	0	(United States) Silicon Valley SA	May 2026 friendlies
GK	Sarah Webb	(14)	1	0	(United States) Solar SC	April 2026 friendlies
GK	Olivia Devaux	(14)	0	0	(United States) HTX	November 2025 training camp
DF	Claire Hansen	(14)	2	0	(United States) Pateadores SC	June 2026 training camp
DF	Khloe Smith	(14)	2	0	(United States) VDA	June 2026 training camp
DF	Brazil Crockett	(14)	0	0	(United States) Phoenix Rising FC	June 2026 training camp
DF	Hollace Larabee	(14)	0	0	(United States) San Diego Surf SC	June 2026 training camp
DF	MJ Ly	(14)	0	0	(United States) Arlington SA	June 2026 training camp
DF	Anna Richardson	(14)	1	0	(United States) TophatSC	June 2026 training camp
DF	Cambria Williams	(14)	1	0	(United States) Eclipse Select SC	June 2026 training camp
DF	Aniah Zembrodt	(14)	1	0	(United States) Kings Hammer FC	June 2026 training camp
DF	Seina Stone	(14)	2	0	(United States) Central Illinois United GA	May 2026 friendlies
DF	Kallington Daniels	(14)	2	0	(United States) Tudela FC	May 2026 friendlies
DF	Saige Austin	(14)	2	0	(United States) Tudela FC	May 2026 friendlies
DF	Ariana Rodriguez	(14)	2	1	(United States) Solar SC	May 2026 friendlies
DF	Sydney Eaton	(14)	0	0	(United States) TophatSC	May 2026 friendlies
DF	Brynn Buchanan	(14)	1	0	(United States) TophatSC	April 2026 friendlies
DF	Aylani Callwood	(14)	1	0	(United States) Bethesda SC	April 2026 friendlies
DF	Josephene Loke	(14)	1	0	(United States) City SC San Diego	April 2026 friendlies
DF	Giavanna Mizzo	(14)	1	0	(United States) Arlington SA	April 2026 friendlies
DF	Bonnie Earl	(14)	0	0	(United States) Southern California Blues SC	November 2025 training camp
MF	Aubrey Taylor	(14)	2	0	(United States) San Diego Surf SC	June 2026 training camp
MF	Angelica Alzugaray	(14)	1	0	(United States) Cincinnati United SC	June 2026 training camp
MF	Lilia Bhuta	(14)	1	1	(United States) Century United FC	June 2026 training camp
MF	Riley Broad	(14)	1	0	(United States) Players Development Academy	June 2026 training camp
MF	Maddie James	(14)	1	0	(United States) Ohio Elite SA	June 2026 training camp
MF	Olivia Winters	(14)	2	3	(United States) Eclipse Select SC	June 2026 training camp
MF	Tatiana Zamora	(14)	2	0	(United States) Silicon Valley SA	May 2026 friendlies
MF	Gabriella Hollins	(14)	2	0	(United States) STA	May 2026 friendlies
MF	Harper St. James	(14)	0	0	(United States) SC del Sol	May 2026 friendlies
MF	Faith Staudenmyer	(14)	2	0	(United States) Solar SC	May 2026 friendlies
MF	Alexa Sarb	(14)	1	0	(United States) Tennessee SC	April 2026 friendlies
MF	Kai Bright	(14)	0	0	(United States) Concorde Fire	November 2025 training camp
MF	Olivia Rubin	(14)	0	0	(United States) North Carolina Courage Academy	November 2025 training camp
FW	Marley Skalski	(14)	2	1	(United States) Western New York Flash	June 2026 training camp
FW	Michelle Myers	(14)	2	0	(United States) Beach Futbol Club	June 2026 training camp
FW	Anna Change	(14)	2	0	(United States) Virginia Development Academy	June 2026 training camp
FW	Lyla Charlet	(14)	1	0	(United States) Richmond United SC	June 2026 training camp
FW	Olivia Jones	(14)	2	2	(United States) Indy Premier SC	June 2026 training camp
FW	Ava Sadlowski	(14)	2	1	(United States) Albion Hurricanes FC	June 2026 training camp
FW	Tori Vassor	(14)	2	1	(United States) KC Current II	June 2026 training camp
FW	Zoe Thompson	(14)	2	0	(United States) Tudela FC	May 2026 friendlies
FW	Zoey Montgomery	(14)	2	0	(United States) Indy Premier SC	May 2026 friendlies
FW	Arianni Hodge	(14)	2	0	(United States) Sting Austin	May 2026 friendlies
FW	Alaia Harrington	(14)	1	0	(United States) FC Dallas	April 2026 friendlies
FW	Aubrey Taylor	(14)	0	0	(United States) San Diego Surf SC	November 2025 training camp
FW	Chatham Walsh	(14)	0	0	(United States) North Carolina Courage Academy	November 2025 training camp
