= 2025 FIFA U-17 Women's World Cup squads =

The following is a list of squads for each national team competing at the 2025 FIFA U-17 Women's World Cup. The tournament took place in Morocco, from 17 October to 8 November 2025. It was the ninth biennial international world youth football championship organised by FIFA for the women's under-17 national teams.

Players born between 1 January 2008 and 31 December 2010 were eligible to compete in the tournament. Each team had to register a squad of 21 players, minimum three of whom had to be goalkeepers (regulation article 27.1). The final squads were confirmed by FIFA on 9 October 2025. The full squad listings are below.

The age listed for each player is their age as of 17 October 2025, the first day of the tournament. The club listed is the club for which the player last played a competitive match prior to the tournament. The nationality for each club reflects the national association (not the league) to which the club is affiliated. A flag is included for coaches who are of a different nationality to their team.

== Group A ==
=== Morocco ===
Head coach: Anwar Mghinia

No.	Pos.	Player	Date of birth (age)	Club
1	GK	Ahlam Boukhorb	1 March 2008 (aged 17)	(Royal Moroccan Football Federation) AS FAR
2	DF	Maryam Rahmoune	5 December 2008 (aged 16)	(French Football Federation) Montpellier
3	DF	Anissa Hamdani	21 January 2009 (aged 16)	(French Football Federation) Dijon
4	DF	Imène Diyen	15 June 2009 (aged 16)	(French Football Federation) Paris Saint-Germain
5	DF	Maissane Ferkous	19 June 2009 (aged 16)	(French Football Federation) Le Mans
6	MF	Celia Bouzman	27 March 2009 (aged 16)	(French Football Federation) Toulouse
7	FW	Jennah Chafni	31 July 2009 (aged 16)	(French Football Federation) Marseille
8	FW	Inaya Kahlaoui	31 October 2008 (aged 16)	(French Football Federation) Le Puy
9	FW	Dounia El Mesmoudi	10 March 2008 (aged 17)	(German Football Association) Eintracht Frankfurt
10	FW	Kautar Azraf	3 January 2008 (aged 17)	(Royal Spanish Football Federation) Barcelona
11	FW	Mayssa Baha	16 January 2011 (aged 14)	(Royal Spanish Football Federation) Barcelona
12	GK	Salma Assahl	3 July 2008 (aged 17)	(Royal Moroccan Football Federation) RS Berkane
13	DF	Laila Boushaba	25 November 2009 (aged 15)	(Royal Dutch Football Association) PEC Zwolle
14	DF	Hiba Youssoufi	20 June 2009 (aged 16)	(Royal Moroccan Football Federation) AS FAR
15	MF	Nihad Lghachi	24 May 2008 (aged 17)	(Royal Moroccan Football Federation) SC Casablanca
16	GK	Hanna El Mokadem	13 February 2008 (aged 17)	(French Football Federation) Annecy
17	MF	Romaissa Ihssan	17 September 2008 (aged 17)	(French Football Federation) Montpellier
18	MF	Isra Redouani	9 January 2008 (aged 17)	(Royal Dutch Football Association) Excelsior
19	FW	Sara El Hajouti	31 March 2009 (aged 16)	(Royal Dutch Football Association) Utrecht
20	FW	Sonia Abajiou	6 October 2009 (aged 16)	(German Football Association) Eintracht Frankfurt
21	FW	Amana Lakradi	4 March 2009 (aged 16)	(Royal Dutch Football Association) AZ

=== Brazil ===
Head coach: Rilany

No.	Pos.	Player	Date of birth (age)	Club
1	GK	Ana Morganti	30 November 2008 (aged 16)	(Brazilian Football Confederation) Corinthians
2	DF	Allyne	14 June 2008 (aged 17)	(Brazilian Football Confederation) Grêmio
3	DF	Marina Campillo	18 August 2008 (aged 17)	(Brazilian Football Confederation) São Paulo
4	DF	Dany Pereira	27 June 2008 (aged 17)	(Brazilian Football Confederation) Corinthians
5	DF	Andreyna	2 March 2009 (aged 16)	(Brazilian Football Confederation) Ferroviária
6	MF	Julia Pereira	19 April 2008 (aged 17)	(Brazilian Football Confederation) São Paulo
7	FW	Ravenna	25 July 2008 (aged 17)	(Brazilian Football Confederation) Fortaleza
8	MF	Pepê	14 April 2009 (aged 16)	(Brazilian Football Confederation) Corinthians
9	FW	Gabi Pusch	20 February 2008 (aged 17)	(Brazilian Football Confederation) Ferroviária
10	MF	Kaylane	8 December 2008 (aged 16)	(Brazilian Football Confederation) Flamengo
11	MF	Giovanna Waksman	21 March 2009 (aged 16)	(United States Soccer Federation) FC Florida
12	GK	Josi Bencke	19 May 2008 (aged 17)	(Brazilian Football Confederation) Grêmio
13	FW	Maria	28 November 2008 (aged 16)	(Brazilian Football Confederation) Grêmio
14	MF	Hellena Victória	23 May 2008 (aged 17)	(Brazilian Football Confederation) Ferroviária
15	DF	Mariane Martins	26 May 2009 (aged 16)	(Brazilian Football Confederation) São Paulo
16	MF	Gabi Rolnik	10 August 2010 (aged 15)	(Portuguese Football Federation) Benfica
17	FW	Evelin Bonifácio	8 April 2008 (aged 17)	(Brazilian Football Confederation) Santos
18	DF	Dulce Maria	27 February 2008 (aged 17)	(Brazilian Football Confederation) Corinthians
19	MF	Giovana Iseppe	10 October 2008 (aged 17)	(Brazilian Football Confederation) São Paulo
20	MF	Julia Faria	26 April 2008 (aged 17)	(Brazilian Football Confederation) Corinthians
21	GK	Jhennifer Santos	12 May 2008 (aged 17)	(Brazilian Football Confederation) Ferroviária

=== Italy ===
Head coach: Viviana Schiavi

No.	Pos.	Player	Date of birth (age)	Club
1	GK	Matilde Robbioni	20 June 2008 (aged 17)	(Italian Football Federation) Inter Milan
2	DF	Elisa Bertero	16 November 2008 (aged 16)	(Italian Football Federation) Juventus
3	DF	Caterina Venturelli	15 October 2008 (aged 17)	(Italian Football Federation) Sassuolo
4	DF	Sofia Verrini	13 November 2008 (aged 16)	(Italian Football Federation) Inter Milan
5	DF	Sofia Pomati	11 February 2008 (aged 17)	(Italian Football Federation) AC Milan
6	MF	Giulia Robino	18 January 2008 (aged 17)	(Italian Football Federation) Roma
7	FW	Giulia Galli	23 March 2008 (aged 17)	(Italian Football Federation) Roma
8	MF	Benedetta Bedini	11 July 2008 (aged 17)	(Italian Football Federation) Fiorentina
9	FW	Viola Volpini	27 January 2008 (aged 17)	(Italian Football Federation) Juventus
10	MF	Rachele Giudici	10 November 2008 (aged 16)	(Italian Football Federation) Inter Milan
11	MF	Caterina Iannaccone	11 January 2008 (aged 17)	(Italian Football Federation) Roma
12	GK	Viola Sossai	24 May 2008 (aged 17)	(Italian Football Federation) Juventus
13	DF	Francesca Randazzo	21 March 2008 (aged 17)	(Italian Football Federation) Sassuolo
14	DF	Sara Terlizzi	9 September 2008 (aged 17)	(Italian Football Federation) Roma
15	MF	Valentina Piccardi	14 April 2008 (aged 17)	(Italian Football Federation) Juventus
16	DF	Martina Bressan	9 July 2008 (aged 17)	(Italian Football Federation) Inter Milan
17	FW	Martina Romanelli	6 October 2008 (aged 17)	(Italian Football Federation) Inter Milan
18	MF	Anna Copelli	2 January 2008 (aged 17)	(Italian Football Federation) Juventus
19	FW	Giulia Guerzoni	9 July 2009 (aged 16)	(Italian Football Federation) Sassuolo
20	MF	Marzia Piermarini	2 October 2008 (aged 17)	(Italian Football Federation) Juventus
21	GK	Giulia Martinazzi	15 April 2008 (aged 17)	(Italian Football Federation) Juventus

=== Costa Rica ===
Head coach: Edgar Rodríguez

No.	Pos.	Player	Date of birth (age)	Club
1	GK	Valeria Fernández	18 March 2008 (aged 17)	(Costa Rican Football Federation) Municipal
2	DF	Brithany Arronis	25 January 2009 (aged 16)	(Costa Rican Football Federation) Carmelita
3	DF	Tiara Ruiz	18 February 2009 (aged 16)	(Costa Rican Football Federation) Sporting
4	DF	Rihanna Solano	14 July 2008 (aged 17)	(Costa Rican Football Federation) Saprissa
5	DF	Fabiana Alfaro	23 May 2008 (aged 17)	(Costa Rican Football Federation) Alajuelense
6	MF	Isska Chaverri	20 May 2009 (aged 16)	(Costa Rican Football Federation) Saprissa
7	FW	Emma Azofeifa	18 May 2009 (aged 16)	(Costa Rican Football Federation) Sporting
8	MF	Daniela Ocampo	16 July 2008 (aged 17)	(Costa Rican Football Federation) Alajuelense
9	FW	Michelle Murillo	10 March 2009 (aged 16)	(Costa Rican Football Federation) Sporting
10	FW	Lucía Paniagua	27 November 2009 (aged 15)	(Costa Rican Football Federation) Sporting
11	FW	Nubia Medina	7 August 2010 (aged 15)	(Costa Rican Football Federation) Escorpiones
12	DF	Karol Molina	12 January 2008 (aged 17)	(Costa Rican Football Federation) Alajuelense
13	GK	Melissa Vargas	31 July 2008 (aged 17)	(Costa Rican Football Federation) Alajuelense
14	FW	Kiana López	22 June 2008 (aged 17)	(Costa Rican Football Federation) San Carlos
15	FW	Cameron Mora	9 March 2009 (aged 16)	(Costa Rican Football Federation) Liberia
16	MF	Verónica Solano	6 July 2009 (aged 16)	(United States Soccer Federation) Montverde Academy
17	DF	Naidelyn Barquero	15 November 2009 (aged 15)	(Costa Rican Football Federation) Sporting
18	GK	Ashley Quesada	9 June 2009 (aged 16)	(Costa Rican Football Federation) Alajuelense
19	FW	Alisha Lindo	28 September 2008 (aged 17)	(Costa Rican Football Federation) Saprissa
20	DF	Avril Pérez	28 December 2009 (aged 15)	(Costa Rican Football Federation) Chorotega
21	MF	Naima Moya	9 July 2008 (aged 17)	(Costa Rican Football Federation) Dimas

== Group B ==
=== North Korea ===
Head coach: Pak Song-jin

No.	Pos.	Player	Date of birth (age)	Club
1	GK	Kim Son-gyong	19 March 2009 (aged 16)	(DPR Korea Football Association) April 25
2	DF	Yun Jin-a	13 March 2008 (aged 17)	(DPR Korea Football Association) Amrokgang
3	DF	Ri Jin-a	28 September 2008 (aged 17)	(DPR Korea Football Association) Sobaeksu
4	DF	Oh Jin-sim	15 February 2008 (aged 17)	(DPR Korea Football Association) April 25
5	DF	Kim Yon-a	7 February 2008 (aged 17)	(DPR Korea Football Association) Sobaeksu
6	MF	Pak Su-rim	10 January 2008 (aged 17)	(DPR Korea Football Association) April 25
7	MF	Ri Ui-gyong	19 July 2009 (aged 16)	(DPR Korea Football Association) April 25
8	MF	Eh Chong-gum	21 January 2009 (aged 16)	(DPR Korea Football Association) Sobaeksu
9	MF	Ri Kyong-im	26 March 2009 (aged 16)	(DPR Korea Football Association) April 25
10	FW	Yu Jong-hyang	18 August 2009 (aged 16)	(DPR Korea Football Association) April 25
11	MF	Pak Rye-yong	20 April 2008 (aged 17)	(DPR Korea Football Association) Sobaeksu
12	DF	Ryu Jin-ju	22 April 2008 (aged 17)	(DPR Korea Football Association) Amrokgang
13	DF	Ri Hyo-yang	20 February 2009 (aged 16)	(DPR Korea Football Association) April 25
14	DF	Pak Kum-mi	20 September 2008 (aged 17)	(DPR Korea Football Association) April 25
15	FW	Kim Won-sim	13 May 2010 (aged 15)	(DPR Korea Football Association) Pyongyang IFS
16	FW	Ri Ye-rim	26 December 2010 (aged 14)	(DPR Korea Football Association) Ryomyong
17	DF	Kim Su-rim	25 May 2008 (aged 17)	(DPR Korea Football Association) Amrokgang
18	GK	Kim Su-jin	4 May 2008 (aged 17)	(DPR Korea Football Association) Sobaeksu
19	FW	Kim Sun-nyo	22 January 2008 (aged 17)	(DPR Korea Football Association) April 25
20	MF	Paek So-hyang	1 January 2008 (aged 17)	(DPR Korea Football Association) Naegohyang
21	GK	Hong Ryu-mi	2 June 2009 (aged 16)	(DPR Korea Football Association) Sobaeksu

=== Mexico ===
Head coach: Miguel Gamero

No.	Pos.	Player	Date of birth (age)	Club
1	GK	Valentina Murrieta	22 October 2008 (aged 16)	(Mexican Football Federation) América
2	DF	Alexa Martínez	31 October 2008 (aged 16)	(Mexican Football Federation) Pachuca
3	DF	Vanessa Paredes	2 July 2009 (aged 16)	(Mexican Football Federation) América
4	DF	Berenice Ibarra	24 October 2008 (aged 16)	(Mexican Football Federation) Pachuca
5	DF	Mia Villalpando	10 May 2008 (aged 17)	(Mexican Football Federation) Tigres UANL
6	MF	Stella Barajas	3 April 2009 (aged 16)	(United States Soccer Federation) Legends FC
7	FW	Anaiya Miyazato	3 December 2008 (aged 16)	(United States Soccer Federation) FC Tucson
8	MF	Zoé Sánchez	17 June 2009 (aged 16)	(Mexican Football Federation) Monterrey
9	FW	Ava Stack	31 March 2008 (aged 17)	(United States Soccer Federation) University of Georgia
10	MF	Citlalli Reyes	6 July 2009 (aged 16)	(United States Soccer Federation) Las Vegas Lights
11	FW	Joselyn Solís	25 March 2008 (aged 17)	(Mexican Football Federation) Puebla
12	GK	Bárbara Del Real	5 September 2008 (aged 17)	(Mexican Football Federation) América
13	DF	Emily Delgado	27 November 2009 (aged 15)	(Mexican Football Federation) Atlas
14	DF	Leila Ávila	25 June 2008 (aged 17)	(United States Soccer Federation) San Diego Surf
15	FW	Valeria Vázquez	11 February 2009 (aged 16)	(Mexican Football Federation) Pachuca
16	MF	Samantha Ruíz	18 February 2008 (aged 17)	(United States Soccer Federation) Legends FC
17	DF	Fernanda Monroy	31 March 2009 (aged 16)	(Mexican Football Federation) Toluca
18	FW	Chloe Del Real	14 July 2008 (aged 17)	(Mexican Football Federation) FC Juarez
19	FW	Miranda Solis	28 February 2008 (aged 17)	(Mexican Football Federation) Monterrey
20	DF	Valeria Alvarado	16 February 2008 (aged 17)	(Mexican Football Federation) Guadalajara
21	GK	Dayana Covarrubias	23 September 2008 (aged 17)	(Mexican Football Federation) Atlas

=== Cameroon ===
Head coach: Joséphine Ndoumou

No.	Pos.	Player	Date of birth (age)	Club
1	GK	Fatima Ngamiliya	14 August 2008 (aged 17)	(Cameroonian Football Federation) Exponential
2	DF	Yolande Ngassa	10 October 2008 (aged 17)	(Cameroonian Football Federation) Authentic
3	DF	Crystal Aghogue	21 September 2009 (aged 16)	(Cameroonian Football Federation) Vision Foot
4	DF	Josepha Ayissa	9 July 2009 (aged 16)	(Cameroonian Football Federation) Petrichor
5	MF	Michelle Mbouke	3 March 2009 (aged 16)	(Cameroonian Football Federation) Petrichor
6	MF	Joyce Teufack	22 August 2008 (aged 17)	(Cameroonian Football Federation) AJSAC
7	FW	Ange Tazanou	25 August 2010 (aged 15)	(Cameroonian Football Federation) Bansoa
8	MF	Yolande Zoua	15 February 2010 (aged 15)	(Cameroonian Football Federation) Lekié
9	FW	Lys Tiwa	4 May 2008 (aged 17)	(Cameroonian Football Federation) Lekié
10	FW	Divine Ntsongo	20 October 2010 (aged 14)	(Cameroonian Football Federation) Éclair
11	FW	Ousmanou Habiba	12 August 2009 (aged 16)	(Cameroonian Football Federation) ANAFOOT
12	DF	Chelsy Ngong	17 November 2008 (aged 16)	(Cameroonian Football Federation) Lifa
13	DF	Mendy Ngo	15 August 2008 (aged 17)	(Cameroonian Football Federation) Vision Foot
14	MF	Berla Dule	28 October 2009 (aged 15)	(Cameroonian Football Federation) Vision Foot
15	MF	Marie Mvele	12 October 2008 (aged 17)	(Cameroonian Football Federation) Vision Foot
16	GK	Jessica Mabou	7 January 2009 (aged 16)	(Cameroonian Football Federation) Vision Foot
17	MF	Vasterio Ngali	26 November 2008 (aged 16)	(Cameroonian Football Federation) Nossosi
18	DF	Yvana Wendji	13 December 2008 (aged 16)	(Cameroonian Football Federation) Lekié
19	FW	Béatrice Avana	10 April 2008 (aged 17)	(Cameroonian Football Federation) Caïman Douala
20	GK	Princesse Aponfack	6 January 2008 (aged 17)	(Cameroonian Football Federation) Amazone
21	DF	Claire Mafor	9 January 2008 (aged 17)	(Cameroonian Football Federation) Lekié

=== Netherlands ===
Head coach: Olivier Amelink

No.	Pos.	Player	Date of birth (age)	Club
1	GK	Maren Groothoff	25 February 2009 (aged 16)	(Royal Dutch Football Association) PEC Zwolle
2	DF	Naomi van der Linden	6 December 2008 (aged 16)	(Royal Dutch Football Association) Ajax
3	DF	Aline Weerelts	8 October 2008 (aged 17)	(Royal Dutch Football Association) Utrecht
4	DF	Maud Thomassen	8 April 2008 (aged 17)	(Royal Dutch Football Association) PSV
5	DF	Kim Rietveld	22 July 2008 (aged 17)	(Royal Dutch Football Association) Feyenoord
6	MF	Rosalie Renfurm	22 January 2008 (aged 17)	(Royal Dutch Football Association) Utrecht
7	FW	Liv Pennock	27 February 2008 (aged 17)	(Royal Dutch Football Association) Twente
8	MF	Tess van der Vliet	16 July 2008 (aged 17)	(Royal Dutch Football Association) PSV
9	FW	Rochelity Dap	2 May 2008 (aged 17)	(Royal Dutch Football Association) Utrecht
10	MF	Anne Gelevert	22 February 2009 (aged 16)	(Royal Dutch Football Association) Twente
11	FW	Ranneke Derks	29 April 2008 (aged 17)	(Royal Dutch Football Association) Ajax
12	DF	Inge Bolder	3 July 2008 (aged 17)	(Royal Dutch Football Association) De Graafschap
13	DF	Leah Fuite	2 January 2008 (aged 17)	(Royal Dutch Football Association) Twente
14	MF	Jayda Vinckers	28 February 2008 (aged 17)	(Royal Dutch Football Association) Feyenoord
15	MF	Kee Hubert	14 July 2008 (aged 17)	(Royal Dutch Football Association) De Graafschap
16	GK	Tess Doeschot	20 November 2008 (aged 16)	(Royal Dutch Football Association) Twente
17	FW	Lina Touzani	28 January 2008 (aged 17)	(Royal Dutch Football Association) Ajax
18	FW	Sophie van Hunnik	21 April 2009 (aged 16)	(Royal Dutch Football Association) Ajax
19	FW	Ayah Eloualidi	2 May 2009 (aged 16)	(Royal Dutch Football Association) AZ
20	FW	Aymee Altena	24 November 2008 (aged 16)	(Royal Dutch Football Association) Heerenveen
21	GK	Abigayle van Lint	3 October 2008 (aged 17)	(Royal Dutch Football Association) Feyenoord

== Group C ==
=== United States ===
Head coach: Katie Schoepfer

No.	Pos.	Player	Date of birth (age)	Club
1	GK	Evan O'Steen	22 March 2008 (aged 17)	(United States Soccer Federation) Florida State Seminoles
2	DF	Cali O'Neill	16 January 2008 (aged 17)	(United States Soccer Federation) North Carolina Courage
3	DF	Sydney Schmidt	25 January 2008 (aged 17)	(United States Soccer Federation) Sporting JAX
4	DF	Pearl Cecil	24 January 2008 (aged 17)	(United States Soccer Federation) Virginia Cavaliers
5	DF	Meila Brewer	24 March 2009 (aged 16)	(United States Soccer Federation) UCLA Bruins
6	MF	Scottie Antonucci	4 January 2008 (aged 17)	(United States Soccer Federation) Legends FC
7	MF	Nyanya Touray	25 July 2008 (aged 17)	(United States Soccer Federation) Florida State Seminoles
8	MF	Chloe Sadler	9 December 2008 (aged 16)	(United States Soccer Federation) La Roca FC
9	FW	Lauren Malsom	14 March 2008 (aged 17)	(United States Soccer Federation) North Carolina Tar Heels
10	MF	Jaiden Rodriguez	27 May 2008 (aged 17)	(United States Soccer Federation) USC Trojans
11	FW	Maddie DiMaria	16 February 2009 (aged 16)	(United States Soccer Federation) St. Louis Scott Gallagher SC
12	GK	Peyton Trayer	11 March 2008 (aged 17)	(United States Soccer Federation) Slammers
13	DF	Olivia Robinson	30 April 2008 (aged 17)	(United States Soccer Federation) STA
14	DF	Natalie Chudowsky	14 February 2008 (aged 17)	(United States Soccer Federation) New York SC
15	MF	Riley Kennedy	15 June 2008 (aged 17)	(United States Soccer Federation) North Carolina Tar Heels
16	FW	Anastasia Showler-Little	4 December 2008 (aged 16)	(United States Soccer Federation) PDA
17	FW	Micayla Johnson	18 January 2008 (aged 17)	(United States Soccer Federation) Chicago Stars
18	FW	Mckenna Whitham	27 July 2010 (aged 15)	(United States Soccer Federation) Gotham FC
19	FW	Kherrington Ream	8 July 2009 (aged 16)	(United States Soccer Federation) Utah Royals
20	FW	Ellie Kocher	5 August 2008 (aged 17)	(United States Soccer Federation) Penn Fusion
21	GK	Ella McNeal	20 July 2009 (aged 16)	(United States Soccer Federation) St. Louis Scott Gallagher SC

=== Ecuador ===
Head coach: Victor Idrobo

No.	Pos.	Player	Date of birth (age)	Club
1	GK	Nayely Rodríguez	28 October 2008 (aged 16)	(Ecuadorian Football Federation) Universidad Católica
2	DF	Rosa Estupiñán	2 April 2008 (aged 17)	(Ecuadorian Football Federation) Independiente del Valle
3	DF	Maite Zambrano	13 October 2008 (aged 17)	(Ecuadorian Football Federation) Independiente del Valle
4	DF	Ammy Flores	10 March 2008 (aged 17)	(Ecuadorian Football Federation) Independiente del Valle
5	MF	Abigail Villacís	19 May 2008 (aged 17)	(Ecuadorian Football Federation) Independiente del Valle
6	DF	Scarlet Garaicoa	25 July 2008 (aged 17)	(Ecuadorian Football Federation) Barcelona SC
7	MF	Emily Delgado	20 September 2008 (aged 17)	(Ecuadorian Football Federation) Universidad Católica
8	MF	Valeria Briones	8 November 2009 (aged 15)	(Ecuadorian Football Federation) Barcelona SC
9	FW	Jaslyn Valverde	10 December 2009 (aged 15)	(Ecuadorian Football Federation) Independiente del Valle
10	MF	Mary Guerra	7 March 2008 (aged 17)	(Ecuadorian Football Federation) Independiente del Valle
11	FW	Emily Fierro	24 October 2008 (aged 16)	(Ecuadorian Football Federation) Independiente del Valle
12	GK	Analía Machuca	1 May 2010 (aged 15)	(Ecuadorian Football Federation) Independiente del Valle
13	DF	Dayanna Andocilla	7 March 2009 (aged 16)	(Ecuadorian Football Federation) Búhos
14	DF	Nicole Yépezz	13 November 2008 (aged 16)	(Ecuadorian Football Federation) Universidad Católica
15	DF	Esther Carabalí	22 May 2009 (aged 16)	(Ecuadorian Football Federation) Independiente del Valle
16	FW	Xiomara Alcívar	14 September 2008 (aged 17)	(Ecuadorian Football Federation) LDU Quito
17	FW	Emily Vargas	7 June 2008 (aged 17)	(Ecuadorian Football Federation) Barcelona SC
18	FW	Rihanna Quiñónez	13 August 2009 (aged 16)	(Ecuadorian Football Federation) Búhos
19	FW	Erika López	19 December 2008 (aged 16)	(Ecuadorian Football Federation) Ñañas
20	MF	Zoe Garcés	12 February 2008 (aged 17)	(United States Soccer Federation) Olé FC
21	GK	Danna Pilamunga	31 January 2009 (aged 16)	(Ecuadorian Football Federation) Macará

=== China PR ===
Head coach: Wang Hongliang

No.	Pos.	Player	Date of birth (age)	Club
1	GK	Niu Ziqi	2 June 2009 (aged 16)	(Chinese Football Association) Shandong
2	DF	Chen Yuying	9 April 2008 (aged 17)	(Chinese Football Association) Zhejiang
3	DF	He Yuanqi	27 February 2008 (aged 17)	(Chinese Football Association) Jiangsu
4	DF	Yang Yuxuan	17 May 2010 (aged 15)	(Chinese Football Association) Jiangsu
5	DF	Song Yu	21 May 2008 (aged 17)	(Chinese Football Association) Beijing
6	MF	Chen Ruilin	12 May 2008 (aged 17)	(Chinese Football Association) Shanghai
7	FW	Xu Yue	7 April 2010 (aged 15)	(Chinese Football Association) Shanghai
8	MF	Yu Tianzhen	7 April 2008 (aged 17)	(Chinese Football Association) Jiangsu
9	FW	Huang Qinyi	29 July 2009 (aged 16)	(Chinese Football Association) Shanghai
10	FW	Zhou Xinyi	26 February 2008 (aged 17)	(Chinese Football Association) Shanghai
11	FW	Chen Junji	30 January 2008 (aged 17)	(Chinese Football Association) Zhejiang
12	GK	Li Xinzhi	9 June 2009 (aged 16)	(Chinese Football Association) Guangzhou
13	GK	You Yaxin	17 October 2008 (aged 17)	(Chinese Football Association) Jiangsu
14	DF	Zhou Yajie	28 October 2008 (aged 16)	(Chinese Football Association) Shanghai
15	DF	Cai Xinlin	18 May 2009 (aged 16)	(Chinese Football Association) Shanghai
16	MF	Xu Xiaotang	4 January 2010 (aged 15)	(Chinese Football Association) Jiangsu
17	MF	Zeng Yijie	30 March 2008 (aged 17)	(Chinese Football Association) Shanghai
18	MF	Zhang Kecan	17 September 2008 (aged 17)	(Chinese Football Association) Shandong
19	FW	Fang Zhenzhu	19 January 2009 (aged 16)	(Chinese Football Association) Shenzhen
20	MF	Song Lijuan	29 March 2008 (aged 17)	(Chinese Football Association) Hunan
21	FW	Li Qixian	26 February 2009 (aged 16)	(Chinese Football Association) Jiangsu

=== Norway ===
Head coach: Eline Kulstad-Torneus

No.	Pos.	Player	Date of birth (age)	Club
1	GK	Maria Kroken	17 January 2008 (aged 17)	(Norwegian Football Federation) Lyn
2	DF	Ebba Niss	10 November 2008 (aged 16)	(Norwegian Football Federation) Kolbotn
3	DF	Nathalie Skeide	16 November 2008 (aged 16)	(Norwegian Football Federation) Brann
4	DF	Mille Flø	4 September 2008 (aged 17)	(Norwegian Football Federation) Stabæk
5	DF	Lea Ellingsen	10 March 2008 (aged 17)	(Norwegian Football Federation) Kolbotn
6	MF	Aida Berg	7 March 2008 (aged 17)	(Norwegian Football Federation) Kolbotn
7	MF	Tomine Enger	12 April 2008 (aged 17)	(Norwegian Football Federation) Vålerenga
8	MF	Sigrid Gamst	28 August 2009 (aged 16)	(Norwegian Football Federation) Kolbotn
9	FW	Julie Steen	21 May 2008 (aged 17)	(Norwegian Football Federation) Røa
10	FW	Heidi Halbmayr	24 July 2008 (aged 17)	(Norwegian Football Federation) Arna-Bjørnar
11	FW	Christina Herseth	10 September 2008 (aged 17)	(Norwegian Football Federation) Lillestrøm
12	GK	Sara Holte	3 June 2008 (aged 17)	(Norwegian Football Federation) Aalesund
13	DF	Sandra Pallesen-Nygård	20 April 2008 (aged 17)	(Norwegian Football Federation) Stabæk
14	FW	Amalie Lia	15 May 2008 (aged 17)	(Norwegian Football Federation) Kolbotn
15	MF	Celia Halvorsen	17 January 2008 (aged 17)	(Norwegian Football Federation) Stabæk
16	MF	Maren Fuglås	19 June 2008 (aged 17)	(Norwegian Football Federation) Rosenborg
17	DF	Isa Lund	14 September 2009 (aged 16)	(Norwegian Football Federation) Brann
18	DF	Maria Hagen	25 October 2008 (aged 16)	(Norwegian Football Federation) HamKam
19	DF	Sunniva Hjertvik	27 November 2008 (aged 16)	(Norwegian Football Federation) Haugesund
20	MF	Elida Kolbjørnsen	8 August 2008 (aged 17)	(French Football Federation) Lyon
21	GK	Tiril Sand	4 May 2008 (aged 17)	(Norwegian Football Federation) Rosenborg

== Group D ==
=== Nigeria ===
Head coach: Bankole Olowookere

No.	Pos.	Player	Date of birth (age)	Club
1	GK	Elizabeth Boniface	23 September 2008 (aged 17)	(Nigeria Football Federation) Abia Angels FC
2	MF	Azeezat Oduntan	10 July 2009 (aged 16)	(Nigeria Football Federation) FC Robo Queens
3	MF	Waliat Rotimi	1 January 2009 (aged 16)	(Nigeria Football Federation) Nakamura Football Academy
4	DF	Hannah Ibrahim	7 July 2008 (aged 17)	(Nigeria Football Federation) Remo Stars FC
5	DF	Christiana Sunday	26 May 2009 (aged 16)	(Nigeria Football Federation) Imo Striker's Queens FC
6	DF	Jumai Adebayo	1 April 2008 (aged 17)	(Nigeria Football Federation) Rivers Angels FC
7	FW	Nguemo Terlumun	21 November 2009 (aged 15)	(Nigeria Football Federation) Braavos FC
8	MF	Shakirat Moshood	4 January 2008 (aged 17)	(Nigeria Football Federation) Bayelsa Queens FC
9	FW	Mariam Yahaya	9 June 2010 (aged 15)	(Nigeria Football Federation) FC Robo Queens
10	MF	Memunat Abubakar	8 November 2010 (aged 14)	(Nigeria Football Federation) Onimarg FC
11	MF	Muinat Rotimi	25 March 2009 (aged 16)	(Nigeria Football Federation) Nakamura Football Academy
12	MF	Queen Joseph	24 November 2009 (aged 15)	(Nigeria Football Federation) FOSLA Academy
13	FW	Chisom Nwachukwu	7 February 2008 (aged 17)	(Nigeria Football Federation) Rivers Angels FC
14	FW	Kaosarat Olanrewaju	1 August 2009 (aged 16)	(Nigeria Football Federation) Onimarg FC
15	FW	Shavih Istifanus	13 January 2009 (aged 16)	(Nigeria Football Federation) Jos City Football Academy
16	GK	Sylvia Echefu	24 December 2009 (aged 15)	(Nigeria Football Federation) Bayelsa Queens FC
17	DF	Nofisat Tijani	20 July 2009 (aged 16)	(Nigeria Football Federation) Onimarg FC
18	FW	Zainab Raji	29 December 2009 (aged 15)	(Nigeria Football Federation) Dannaz FC Ladies
19	FW	Ugomma Nkwocha	8 May 2010 (aged 15)	(Nigeria Football Federation) Imo Striker's Queens FC
20	DF	Fatimoh Shuaib	30 November 2009 (aged 15)	(Nigeria Football Federation) Nasarawa Amazons FC
21	GK	Onyinyechi Opara	16 December 2009 (aged 15)	(Nigeria Football Federation) Imo Striker's Queens FC

=== Canada ===
Head coach: (England) Jen Herst

No.	Pos.	Player	Date of birth (age)	Club
1	GK	Olivia Busby	5 February 2008 (aged 17)	(Canadian Soccer Association) NDC-CDN Ontario
2	DF	Marika Martineau	22 July 2008 (aged 17)	(Canadian Soccer Association) CF Montréal
3	DF	Mya Angus	21 March 2008 (aged 17)	(Canadian Soccer Association) NDC-CDN Ontario
4	DF	Chloe Taylor	2 September 2008 (aged 17)	(Canadian Soccer Association) Vancouver Rise FC
5	DF	Bridget Mutipula	5 August 2008 (aged 17)	(Canadian Soccer Association) Vancouver Rise FC
6	MF	Felicia Hanisch	22 September 2008 (aged 17)	(Canadian Soccer Association) Ottawa South United
7	FW	Lacey Kindel	27 September 2009 (aged 16)	(Canadian Soccer Association) Vancouver Rise FC
8	MF	Olivia Chisholm	5 December 2008 (aged 16)	(Canadian Soccer Association) NDC-CDN Ontario
9	FW	Melisa Kekić	27 April 2008 (aged 17)	(Canadian Soccer Association) NDC-CDN Ontario
10	FW	Gabriela Istocki	25 July 2009 (aged 16)	(Canadian Soccer Association) NDC-CDN Ontario
11	FW	Molly Hale	20 January 2008 (aged 17)	(Canadian Soccer Association) NDC-CDN Ontario
12	DF	Emma Donnelly	26 March 2008 (aged 17)	(Canadian Soccer Association) NDC-CDN Ontario
13	FW	Melyna Alexis	15 November 2009 (aged 15)	(Canadian Soccer Association) CF Montréal
14	MF	Daniela Feria-Estrada	13 April 2009 (aged 16)	(Canadian Soccer Association) Vancouver Rise FC
15	FW	Naomi Lofthouse	9 January 2008 (aged 17)	(Canadian Soccer Association) Ottawa South United
16	DF	Amy Medley	12 September 2008 (aged 17)	(Canadian Soccer Association) CF Montréal
17	FW	Alyssa McLeod	15 June 2009 (aged 16)	(Canadian Soccer Association) NDC-CDN Ontario
18	GK	Khadijah Cissé	18 May 2008 (aged 17)	(United States Soccer Federation) Kentucky Wildcats
19	FW	Reed Tingley	3 September 2009 (aged 16)	(United States Soccer Federation) Concorde Fire SC
20	MF	Julia Amireh	19 October 2008 (aged 17)	(United States Soccer Federation) NC Courage
21	GK	Kylie Sandulak	18 May 2008 (aged 17)	(Canadian Soccer Association) Vancouver Rise FC

=== France ===
Head coach: Mickaël Ferreira

No.	Pos.	Player	Date of birth (age)	Club
1	GK	Alexane Lambert	2 October 2008 (aged 17)	(French Football Federation) OL Lyonnes
2	DF	Ludivine Bardet	7 June 2008 (aged 17)	(French Football Federation) Toulouse FC
3	DF	Noémie Fatier	19 July 2008 (aged 17)	(French Football Federation) Paris Saint-Germain
4	DF	Médina Belaïd	16 March 2008 (aged 17)	(French Football Federation) Paris Saint-Germain
5	MF	Maïssa Fathallah	9 April 2009 (aged 16)	(French Football Federation) OL Lyonnes
6	MF	Bouchra Kharafi	7 February 2008 (aged 17)	(French Football Federation) Montpellier HSC
7	FW	Camille Marmillot	23 July 2008 (aged 17)	(French Football Federation) OL Lyonnes
8	MF	Tanté Diakité	2 June 2008 (aged 17)	(French Football Federation) Paris Saint-Germain
9	FW	Rachael Adedini	20 June 2009 (aged 16)	(The Football Association) Manchester City W.F.C.
10	FW	Lou Ruffien	22 October 2008 (aged 16)	(French Football Federation) Paris FC
11	FW	Léa Morissaint	12 July 2008 (aged 17)	(French Football Federation) Paris Saint-Germain
12	DF	Océane Moreau-Tranchant	27 June 2008 (aged 17)	(French Football Federation) OL Lyonnes
13	DF	Talila Seika	21 April 2008 (aged 17)	(French Football Federation) Le Havre AC
14	MF	Stella Grondin	12 May 2008 (aged 17)	(French Football Federation) Paris Saint-Germain
15	MF	Eléna Moreira da Rocha	17 August 2008 (aged 17)	(French Football Federation) Lille OSC
16	GK	Lauryne Chevray	6 May 2008 (aged 17)	(French Football Federation) Montpellier HSC
17	MF	Nina Dumans	8 July 2008 (aged 17)	(French Football Federation) Paris FC
18	FW	Thaïs Gallais	18 April 2008 (aged 17)	(French Football Federation) Le Havre AC
19	FW	Sofia Djoubri	27 June 2008 (aged 17)	(French Football Federation) Paris Saint-Germain
20	FW	Luna Laboucarié	28 April 2008 (aged 17)	(French Football Federation) Le Havre AC
21	GK	Nell Poyé	26 September 2008 (aged 17)	(French Football Federation) Stade Reims

=== Samoa ===
Head coach: (Guatemala) Juan José Chang

No.	Pos.	Player	Date of birth (age)	Club
1	GK	Grace Ae	6 July 2008 (aged 17)	(United States Soccer Federation) LAFC So Cal Youth
2	FW	Cali Willis	24 June 2009 (aged 16)	(United States Soccer Federation) Liverpool FC
3	DF	Mikayla Afoa	21 July 2010 (aged 15)	(Football Australia) Queensland Academy of Sport
4	DF	Mia Afoa	11 February 2009 (aged 16)	(Football Australia) Brisbane City FC
5	MF	Taimane Devoux	7 July 2010 (aged 15)	Free agent
6	DF	Breanna Kitiona	9 January 2009 (aged 16)	(United States Soccer Federation) Ajax Utah FC
7	MF	Brielle Tautua	9 October 2010 (aged 15)	(United States Soccer Federation) Legends FC
8	MF	Leah Atuaia	7 October 2008 (aged 17)	(United States Soccer Federation) Utah Celtic FC
9	DF	Simone Blood	17 May 2008 (aged 17)	(United States Soccer Federation) Papakura City FC
10	MF	Macey Tuiolosega	6 March 2009 (aged 16)	(United States Soccer Federation) Slammers HB Køge
11	FW	Makea Leonard	11 March 2008 (aged 17)	(United States Soccer Federation) LAFC So Cal Youth
12	GK	Siatunuu McCarthy	2 September 2009 (aged 16)	(New Zealand Football) Papakura City FC
13	FW	Jayde Eldredge	6 March 2009 (aged 16)	(United States Soccer Federation) Leahi Soccer Club
14	FW	Holly Leapai	10 December 2008 (aged 16)	(Football Australia) Brisbane City FC
15	DF	Makeli Leonard	1 June 2009 (aged 16)	(United States Soccer Federation) LAFC So Cal Youth
16	DF	Alia Loua	21 March 2010 (aged 15)	(United States Soccer Federation) Seattle United
17	DF	Reyna Tufuga	19 December 2009 (aged 15)	(United States Soccer Federation) Beach FC
18	DF	Jhalilah Sio	25 September 2008 (aged 17)	(United States Soccer Federation) Sporting California USA
19	DF	Ayres Ava	28 May 2009 (aged 16)	(United States Soccer Federation) South Carolina United
20	DF	Imogen Panapa	5 January 2008 (aged 17)	Free agent
21	GK	Margaret Fagasuisui	12 May 2009 (aged 16)	(New Zealand Football) Manukau United FC

== Group E ==
=== Spain ===
Head coach: Mila Martínez

No.	Pos.	Player	Date of birth (age)	Club
1	GK	Alba Fuertes	5 April 2008 (aged 17)	(Royal Spanish Football Federation) Real Sporting de Gijón
2	DF	Raquel Zuazo	4 February 2008 (aged 17)	(Royal Spanish Football Federation) Real Madrid CF
3	DF	Maialen Valladares	20 January 2010 (aged 15)	(Royal Spanish Football Federation) Athletic Club
4	DF	Silvia Cristóbal	1 May 2008 (aged 17)	(Royal Spanish Football Federation) Real Madrid CF
5	DF	Julia Torres	15 January 2009 (aged 16)	(Royal Spanish Football Federation) Sevilla FC
6	MF	Vera Molina	24 April 2009 (aged 16)	(Royal Spanish Football Federation) Granada CF
7	DF	Noa Jiménez	28 March 2008 (aged 17)	(Royal Spanish Football Federation) FC Barcelona
8	FW	Celia Gómez	29 September 2008 (aged 17)	(Royal Spanish Football Federation) Atlético Madrid
9	FW	Lídia Gibert	19 March 2010 (aged 15)	(Royal Spanish Football Federation) FC Barcelona
10	MF	Rosalía Domínguez	11 October 2008 (aged 17)	(Royal Spanish Football Federation) FC Barcelona
11	FW	Anna Quer	30 May 2008 (aged 17)	(Royal Spanish Football Federation) FC Barcelona
12	MF	Carla Castiñeyras	23 October 2008 (aged 16)	(Royal Spanish Football Federation) Alhama CF
13	GK	Anna Álvarez	17 January 2008 (aged 17)	(Royal Spanish Football Federation) Levante UD
14	FW	Lúa Arufe	6 September 2008 (aged 17)	(Royal Spanish Football Federation) FC Barcelona
15	MF	Carolina Ferrera	20 February 2010 (aged 15)	(Royal Spanish Football Federation) CD Tenerife
16	MF	María Carvajal	29 July 2008 (aged 17)	(Italian Football Federation) Juventus FC
17	FW	Iraia Fernández	26 July 2009 (aged 16)	(Royal Spanish Football Federation) Athletic Club
18	FW	María Rius	23 February 2010 (aged 15)	(Royal Spanish Football Federation) FC Barcelona
19	MF	Claudia Barrios	3 December 2008 (aged 16)	(Royal Spanish Football Federation) Atlético Madrid
20	FW	Carlota Chacón	4 April 2009 (aged 16)	(Royal Spanish Football Federation) Real Sociedad
21	GK	Antía Veiga	9 May 2009 (aged 16)	(Royal Spanish Football Federation) Deportivo La Coruña

=== Colombia ===
Head coach: Carlos Paniagua

No.	Pos.	Player	Date of birth (age)	Club
1	GK	Isabella Tejada	18 July 2008 (aged 17)	(Colombian Football Federation) Independiente Medellín
2	DF	Laura Cano	19 January 2008 (aged 17)	(Colombian Football Federation) Acuarium Caribbean
3	DF	Sofía Ortíz	10 May 2008 (aged 17)	(Colombian Football Federation) América de Cali
4	MF	Juanita Parga	22 September 2009 (aged 16)	(Colombian Football Federation) CD Sarmiento Lora
5	MF	Isabella Santa	8 June 2008 (aged 17)	(Colombian Football Federation) Deportivo Cali
6	MF	Ana Clavijo	21 September 2008 (aged 17)	(Colombian Football Federation) Millonarios FC
7	FW	Alejandra Baldovino	15 December 2008 (aged 16)	(Colombian Football Federation) Atlético Junior
8	MF	London Crawford	28 March 2008 (aged 17)	(United States Soccer Federation) Gwinnett Soccer Academy
9	FW	Camila Cortés	17 June 2008 (aged 17)	(Colombian Football Federation) Independiente Santa Fe
10	MF	Ella Martínez	5 April 2008 (aged 17)	(United States Soccer Federation) Carolina Ascent FC
11	MF	Vanessa Puerta	21 May 2009 (aged 16)	(United States Soccer Federation) SUSA FC
12	GK	Sofía Prieto	26 September 2009 (aged 16)	(Colombian Football Federation) Deportivo Cali
13	DF	Isabella Amado	19 September 2008 (aged 17)	(Colombian Football Federation) Millonarios FC
14	MF	Daniela Todd	13 March 2008 (aged 17)	(United States Soccer Federation) Fort Lauderdale United FC
15	MF	Angélica Castillo	18 October 2008 (aged 17)	(United States Soccer Federation) DKSC 07/08 ECNL
16	DF	Izabela Cortés	27 January 2009 (aged 16)	(Colombian Football Federation) Independiente Santa Fe
17	DF	Sofía García	17 January 2008 (aged 17)	(Colombian Football Federation) Real Santander
18	FW	Maura Henao	14 July 2010 (aged 15)	(Colombian Football Federation) CD Sarmiento Lora
19	DF	Camila Ceballos	1 April 2008 (aged 17)	(Colombian Football Federation) Acuarium Caribbean
20	DF	Shaira Collazos	16 May 2008 (aged 17)	(Colombian Football Federation) Millonarios FC
21	GK	Melany Díaz	17 March 2008 (aged 17)	(Colombian Football Federation) Independiente Santa Fe

=== South Korea ===
Head coach: Go Hyun-bok

No.	Pos.	Player	Date of birth (age)	Club
1	GK	Kim Chae-been	14 April 2008 (aged 17)	(Korea Football Association) Gwangyang Girls' HS
2	DF	Yang Se-bin	4 July 2008 (aged 17)	(Korea Football Association) Pohang Girls' Electronic HS
3	DF	Kim Han-ah	8 September 2008 (aged 17)	(Korea Football Association) Gwangyang Girls' HS
4	DF	Baek Ji-eun	16 February 2008 (aged 17)	(Korea Football Association) Ulsan Hyundai HS FC
5	DF	Back Ha-yul	29 November 2008 (aged 16)	(Korea Football Association) Pohang Girls' Electronic HS
6	MF	Jang Ye-yun	2 January 2008 (aged 17)	(Korea Football Association) Ulsan Hyundai HS FC
7	MF	Han Guk-hee	21 August 2009 (aged 16)	(Korea Football Association) Pohang Girls' Electronic HS
8	MF	Lim Ye-ji	29 March 2008 (aged 17)	(Korea Football Association) Pohang Girls' Electronic HS
9	FW	Park Hye-yum	17 December 2008 (aged 16)	(Korea Football Association) Pohang Girls' Electronic HS
10	MF	Hong Seo-yoon	6 July 2008 (aged 17)	(Korea Football Association) Gwangyang Girls' HS
11	FW	Ryoo Ji-hae	22 February 2008 (aged 17)	(Korea Football Association) Ulsan Hyundai HS FC
12	DF	Woo Seo-yeon	3 April 2010 (aged 15)	(Korea Football Association) Jinju Girls' MS
13	FW	Lee Soon-oak	17 November 2009 (aged 15)	(Korea Football Association) Incheon Design HS
14	FW	Baek Seo-yeong	16 May 2009 (aged 16)	(Korea Football Association) Gyeongnam Robot HS
15	MF	Choi Se-eun	16 January 2009 (aged 16)	(Korea Football Association) Gyeongnam Robot HS
16	FW	Kim Hyo-ju	4 November 2008 (aged 16)	(Korea Football Association) Osan Information HS
17	DF	Kwon Ye-been	11 February 2008 (aged 17)	(Korea Football Association) Yesung HS
18	GK	Jung Yu-jeong	12 July 2008 (aged 17)	(Korea Football Association) Ulsan Hyundai HS FC
19	DF	Kim Ji-eun	18 October 2009 (aged 16)	(Korea Football Association) Pohang Girls' Electronic HS
20	DF	Choo Ji-yeon	9 September 2009 (aged 16)	(Korea Football Association) Ulsan Hyundai HS FC
21	GK	Han Hye-ri	10 July 2008 (aged 17)	(Korea Football Association) Daegu Dongbu HS

=== Ivory Coast ===
Head coach: Adélaïde Koudougnon

No.	Pos.	Player	Date of birth (age)	Club
1	GK	Kaholo Zaddy	28 December 2008 (aged 16)	(Ivorian Football Federation) Stella Club
2	DF	Honohio Ikpo	1 January 2010 (aged 15)	(Ivorian Football Federation) OJC Yakro
3	DF	Zon Ambeu	4 February 2009 (aged 16)	(Ivorian Football Federation) SOA Football
4	DF	Priscilia Digbeu	5 May 2009 (aged 16)	(Ivorian Football Federation) CFAD
5	FW	Adjoua N'Guessan	13 May 2008 (aged 17)	(Ivorian Football Federation) Yamoussoukro FC
6	DF	Estelle Véronique Kakou	15 October 2010 (aged 15)	(Ivorian Football Federation) SC Gagnoa
7	MF	Grace Tanoh	1 December 2008 (aged 16)	(Ivorian Football Federation) SOA Football
8	MF	Mama Fofana	30 November 2008 (aged 16)	(Ivorian Football Federation) Athlético FC
9	FW	N'Sira Ouedraogo	21 April 2008 (aged 17)	(Danish Football Association) FC Nordsjaelland
10	MF	Grace Sery	6 February 2008 (aged 17)	(Danish Football Association) FC Nordsjaelland
11	DF	Akoua Ayekoue	15 December 2010 (aged 14)	(Ivorian Football Federation) CS Assouba
12	MF	Aïcha Ouattara	16 March 2009 (aged 16)	(Ivorian Football Federation) Sekala FC
13	DF	Josée Akesse	29 December 2009 (aged 15)	(Ivorian Football Federation) RC Cocody
14	MF	Zéa Koné	14 August 2008 (aged 17)	(Ivorian Football Federation) AGIR FC Guibéroua
15	FW	Gueyagnon Doh	25 September 2010 (aged 15)	(Ivorian Football Federation) OJC Yakro
16	GK	Yasmine Zoumana	17 October 2010 (aged 15)	(Ivorian Football Federation) AGIR FC Guibéroua
17	DF	Mafandje Bakayoko	19 February 2009 (aged 16)	(Ivorian Football Federation) RC Cocody
18	FW	Drehana Gosse	20 December 2008 (aged 16)	(Ivorian Football Federation) Juventus Yopougon
19	DF	Gbahi Digbeu	4 June 2009 (aged 16)	(Ivorian Football Federation) Juventus Yopougon
20	DF	Ahou Konan	2 September 2009 (aged 16)	(Ivorian Football Federation) AGIR FC Guibéroua
21	GK	Rosine Kela	20 October 2008 (aged 16)	(Ivorian Football Federation) Inter-Sion FC

== Group F ==
=== Japan ===
Head coach: Sadayoshi Shirai

No.	Pos.	Player	Date of birth (age)	Club
1	GK	Kaho Kumazawa	31 July 2008 (aged 17)	(Japan Football Association) Urawa Reds Ladies
2	DF	Yuna Miyazaki	13 January 2008 (aged 17)	(Japan Football Association) Mynavi Sendai Ladies
3	DF	Yuna Aoki	7 July 2008 (aged 17)	(Japan Football Association) Urawa Reds Ladies
4	MF	Momoka Sano	17 April 2008 (aged 17)	(Japan Football Association) JFA Academy Fukushima LSC
5	DF	Mihiro Furukawa	5 August 2008 (aged 17)	(Japan Football Association) JFA Academy Fukushima LSC
6	DF	Ema Matsuoka	10 June 2008 (aged 17)	(Japan Football Association) Urawa Reds Ladies
7	MF	Honoka Sunaga	22 July 2008 (aged 17)	(Japan Football Association) Urawa Reds Ladies
8	FW	Konoha Nakamura	27 July 2008 (aged 17)	(Japan Football Association) Cerezo Osaka Yanmar Ladies
9	FW	Nanami Taira	13 May 2008 (aged 17)	(Japan Football Association) INAC Kobe Leonessa
10	MF	Noa Fukushima	12 December 2008 (aged 16)	(Japan Football Association) JFA Academy Fukushima LSC
11	MF	Yuna Takahashi	31 October 2008 (aged 16)	(Japan Football Association) Urawa Reds Ladies
12	GK	Rena Yamauchi	11 December 2008 (aged 16)	(Japan Football Association) Ehime FC Ladies
13	FW	Ua Ono	27 February 2008 (aged 17)	(Japan Football Association) Kochi Gakuen Kochi HS
14	MF	Iro Sato	15 May 2008 (aged 17)	(Japan Football Association) Jumonji High School
15	MF	Niko Shikida	19 December 2008 (aged 16)	(Japan Football Association) Urawa Reds Ladies
16	DF	Mone Sato	15 November 2008 (aged 16)	(Japan Football Association) RB Ōmiya Ardija
17	DF	Kelly Nerei	23 November 2008 (aged 16)	(Japan Football Association) Jumonji High School
18	MF	Shizuru Iida	10 June 2008 (aged 17)	(Japan Football Association) Cerezo Osaka Yanmar Ladies
19	DF	Ena Koizumi	15 February 2008 (aged 17)	(Japan Football Association) AIE International High School
20	FW	Manami Sato	30 March 2008 (aged 17)	(Japan Football Association) Japan Aviation High School
21	GK	Asuka Sekiguchi	25 June 2008 (aged 17)	(Japan Football Association) Cerezo Osaka Yanmar Ladies

=== New Zealand ===
Head coach: Alana Gunn

No.	Pos.	Player	Date of birth (age)	Club
1	GK	Harriet Muller	24 February 2008 (aged 17)	(New Zealand Football) Wellington Phoenix FC
2	DF	Charley March	11 April 2008 (aged 17)	(New Zealand Football) Eastern Suburbs AFC
3	DF	Holly Robins	12 April 2008 (aged 17)	(New Zealand Football) Wellington Phoenix FC
4	DF	Freya Des Fountain	7 February 2008 (aged 17)	(New Zealand Football) Wellington Phoenix FC
5	DF	Taylah Byers	16 November 2008 (aged 16)	(New Zealand Football) Fencibles United AFC
6	MF	Mikaela Bangalan	30 March 2008 (aged 17)	(New Zealand Football) Fencibles United AFC
7	FW	Grace Duncan	3 April 2008 (aged 17)	(New Zealand Football) FC Tauranga Moana
8	MF	Piper O'Neill	17 May 2008 (aged 17)	(New Zealand Football) Auckland United FC
9	FW	Katie Pugh	18 September 2008 (aged 17)	(New Zealand Football) Wellington Phoenix FC
10	MF	Pia Vlok	4 September 2008 (aged 17)	(New Zealand Football) Wellington Phoenix FC
11	FW	Laura Bennett	18 November 2008 (aged 16)	(New Zealand Football) Melville United AFC
12	MF	Natalie Young	15 July 2008 (aged 17)	(New Zealand Football) Wellington Phoenix FC
13	FW	Taylor Vujnovich	4 October 2008 (aged 17)	(New Zealand Football) West Coast Rangers FC
14	MF	Sienna Candy	5 June 2008 (aged 17)	(New Zealand Football) Wellington Phoenix FC
15	FW	Keira Tichbon	20 October 2008 (aged 16)	(United States Soccer Federation) San Diego Surf SC
16	DF	Lane Ririnui	6 December 2008 (aged 16)	(New Zealand Football) FC Tauranga Moana
17	FW	Kya Solomon	1 July 2008 (aged 17)	(New Zealand Football) Wellington Phoenix FC
18	GK	Emma Meadows	1 August 2009 (aged 16)	(New Zealand Football) Melville United AFC
19	DF	Heidi Draai	12 February 2008 (aged 17)	(Football Australia) Heidelberg United FC
20	MF	Ariana Vosper	27 July 2010 (aged 15)	(New Zealand Football) Auckland United FC
21	GK	Nienke Lemmens	8 July 2010 (aged 15)	(Royal Dutch Football Association) AZ Alkmaar

=== Zambia ===
Head coach: Carol Kanyemba

No.	Pos.	Player	Date of birth (age)	Club
1	GK	Mary Nyangu	29 December 2009 (aged 15)	(Football Association of Zambia) Yasa Queens FC
2	DF	Gift Mazimba	26 June 2010 (aged 15)	(Football Association of Zambia) Elite LFC
3	FW	Hellen Sichamba	3 January 2008 (aged 17)	(Football Association of Zambia) Elite LFC
4	MF	Nana Malanda	2 March 2009 (aged 16)	(Football Association of Zambia) Green Buffaloes WFC
5	DF	Precious Mwape	15 December 2009 (aged 15)	(Football Association of Zambia) Luyando Foundation
6	FW	Grace Phiri	28 March 2009 (aged 16)	(Football Association of Zambia) Indeni Roses FC
7	MF	Faith Kajiya	21 December 2010 (aged 14)	(Football Association of Zambia) Elite LFC
8	DF	Beatrice Njobvu	4 October 2010 (aged 15)	(Football Association of Zambia) Red Arrows FC
9	FW	Mercy Chipasula	23 March 2008 (aged 17)	(Football Association of Zambia) Kamnsa Blue Eagles
10	MF	Victoria Mbali	21 February 2008 (aged 17)	(Football Association of Zambia) Green Buffaloes WFC
11	FW	Masela Sekeseke	29 November 2008 (aged 16)	(Football Association of Zambia) Red Arrows FC
12	DF	Natasha Nkaka	16 April 2008 (aged 17)	(Football Association of Zambia) Green Buffaloes WFC
13	MF	Taonga Tembo	6 November 2008 (aged 16)	(Football Association of Zambia) Green Buffaloes WFC
14	MF	Natasha Kasema	17 March 2009 (aged 16)	(Football Association of Zambia) Green Buffaloes WFC
15	MF	Sharon Siakaloba	2 April 2008 (aged 17)	(Football Association of Zambia) Pemba Queens FC
16	GK	Descent Mbewe	16 January 2010 (aged 15)	(Football Association of Zambia) National Assembly FC
17	MF	Taonga Mubanga	20 December 2009 (aged 15)	(Football Association of Zambia) Yasa Queens FC
18	GK	Loveness Chingwele	18 April 2008 (aged 17)	(Football Association of Zambia) Muza Queens FC
19	DF	Lweendo Hanongo	11 May 2008 (aged 17)	(Football Association of Zambia) Driven Queens FC
20	DF	Esther Ngabwe	14 August 2009 (aged 16)	(Football Association of Zambia) Elite LFC
21	DF	Faith Kaunda	22 October 2010 (aged 14)	(Football Association of Zambia) ZedPro Foundation

=== Paraguay ===
Head coach: (Brazil) Luiz Guimarães

No.	Pos.	Player	Date of birth (age)	Club
1	GK	Estefani Ruiz	16 May 2009 (aged 16)	(Paraguayan Football Association) Club Olimpia
2	DF	Bárbara Olmedo	26 January 2008 (aged 17)	(Paraguayan Football Association) Club Olimpia
3	DF	Luz Benítez	25 July 2009 (aged 16)	(Paraguayan Football Association) Club Olimpia
4	DF	Ximena Moreno	28 April 2008 (aged 17)	(Paraguayan Football Association) Club Olimpia
5	MF	Kiara Florentín	27 November 2008 (aged 16)	(Paraguayan Football Association) Club Nacional
6	DF	Jazmín Pintos	3 April 2008 (aged 17)	(Paraguayan Football Association) Cerro Porteño
7	MF	Fiorella Aquino	31 March 2008 (aged 17)	(Paraguayan Football Association) Club Libertad
8	MF	Maite Mussi	13 July 2008 (aged 17)	(Paraguayan Football Association) Club Olimpia
9	FW	Alison Bareiro	3 January 2008 (aged 17)	(Paraguayan Football Association) Club Olimpia
10	FW	Sofía Cabrera	7 August 2010 (aged 15)	(Paraguayan Football Association) Cerro Porteño
11	FW	Claudia Martínez	15 January 2008 (aged 17)	(Paraguayan Football Association) Club Olimpia
12	GK	Paloma Vergara	10 January 2008 (aged 17)	(Paraguayan Football Association) General Caballero JLM
13	DF	Denisse Leiva	6 July 2009 (aged 16)	(Paraguayan Football Association) Cerro Porteño
14	MF	Jazmín Rolón	4 July 2010 (aged 15)	(Paraguayan Football Association) Deportivo Recoleta
15	DF	Fiorella González	11 August 2009 (aged 16)	(Paraguayan Football Association) Club Olimpia
16	MF	Erika Figueredo	14 May 2008 (aged 17)	(Paraguayan Football Association) Cerro Porteño
17	MF	Florencia Cáceres	30 October 2009 (aged 15)	(United States Soccer Federation) Florida Kraze Krush SC
18	MF	Victoria Ucedo	14 June 2010 (aged 15)	(Paraguayan Football Association) Club Olimpia
19	MF	Yuliza Franco	16 December 2008 (aged 16)	(Paraguayan Football Association) Cerro Porteño
20	FW	Cynthia Casco	22 January 2009 (aged 16)	(Paraguayan Football Association) Club Olimpia
21	GK	Tamara Amarilla	22 January 2009 (aged 16)	(Paraguayan Football Association) Cerro Porteño
