= Nicole Charcopa =

Ecuadorian footballer (born 2000)

Personal information
- Full name: Nicole Karen Charcopa Sevillano
- Date of birth: 1 April 2000 (age 26)
- Place of birth: Guayaquil, Ecuador
- Height: 1.62 m (5 ft 4 in)
- Positions: Right-back; right winger

Team information
- Current team: Independiente del Valle

Senior career*
Years	Team	Apps	(Gls)
2014–2015	Fundación Conaviro		
2015	Rocafuerte	11	(2)
2016	Ñañas		
2017–2018	Unión Española		
2019	Deportivo Cuenca	25	(6)
2020	El Nacional	14	(3)
2021	Deportivo Cuenca	19	(3)
2022–2023	Independiente del Valle	30	(7)
2024	Santos	6	(0)
2025–	Independiente del Valle	0	(0)

International career^{‡}
2018–2020	Ecuador U20		
2018–	Ecuador	11	(1)
- * Club domestic league appearances and goals as of 21:06, 19 December 2024 (UTC) ‡ National team caps and goals as of 20:30, 16 January 2024 (UTC)

Nicole Karen Charcopa Sevillano (born 1 April 2000) is an Ecuadorian professional footballer who plays as either a right-back or a right winger for Independiente del Valle and the Ecuador women's national team.

== Club career ==
Born in Guayaquil, Charcopa began her career with Fundación Conaviro in 2014. She subsequently played for Rocafuerte and Ñañas before joining Unión Española de Guayaquil in 2017, where she won two consecutive Serie A Femenina titles.

Charcopa moved to Deportivo Cuenca for the 2019 season, and also helped the club win the league championship. After a one-year spell at El Nacional (which also ended in league title), she returned to Cuenca in 2021.

Ahead of the 2022 campaign, Charcopa agreed to a deal with Independiente del Valle. On 18 January 2024, she was announced at Santos on a one-year deal, becoming the first Ecuadorian to play for the women's team.

== International career ==
Charcopa represented Ecuador at under-20 level in the 2018 South American U-20 Women's Championship. In March 2018, she was included in Wendy Villón's 23-woman squad for the 2018 Copa América Femenina.

== Career statistics ==
=== International ===
As of 13 February 2024

National team	Year	Apps	Goals
Ecuador	2018	2	0
Ecuador	2020	2	0
Ecuador	2021	1	0
Ecuador	2022	2	0
Ecuador	2023	4	1
Total		11	1

== Honours ==
Unión Española

- Serie A Femenina: 2016–17, 2017–18

Deportivo Cuenca

- Superliga Femenina: 2019, 2021

El Nacional

- Superliga Femenina: 2020

Santos

- Copa Paulista de Futebol Feminino: 2024
