= Carina Caicedo =

Ecuadorian footballer (born 1987)

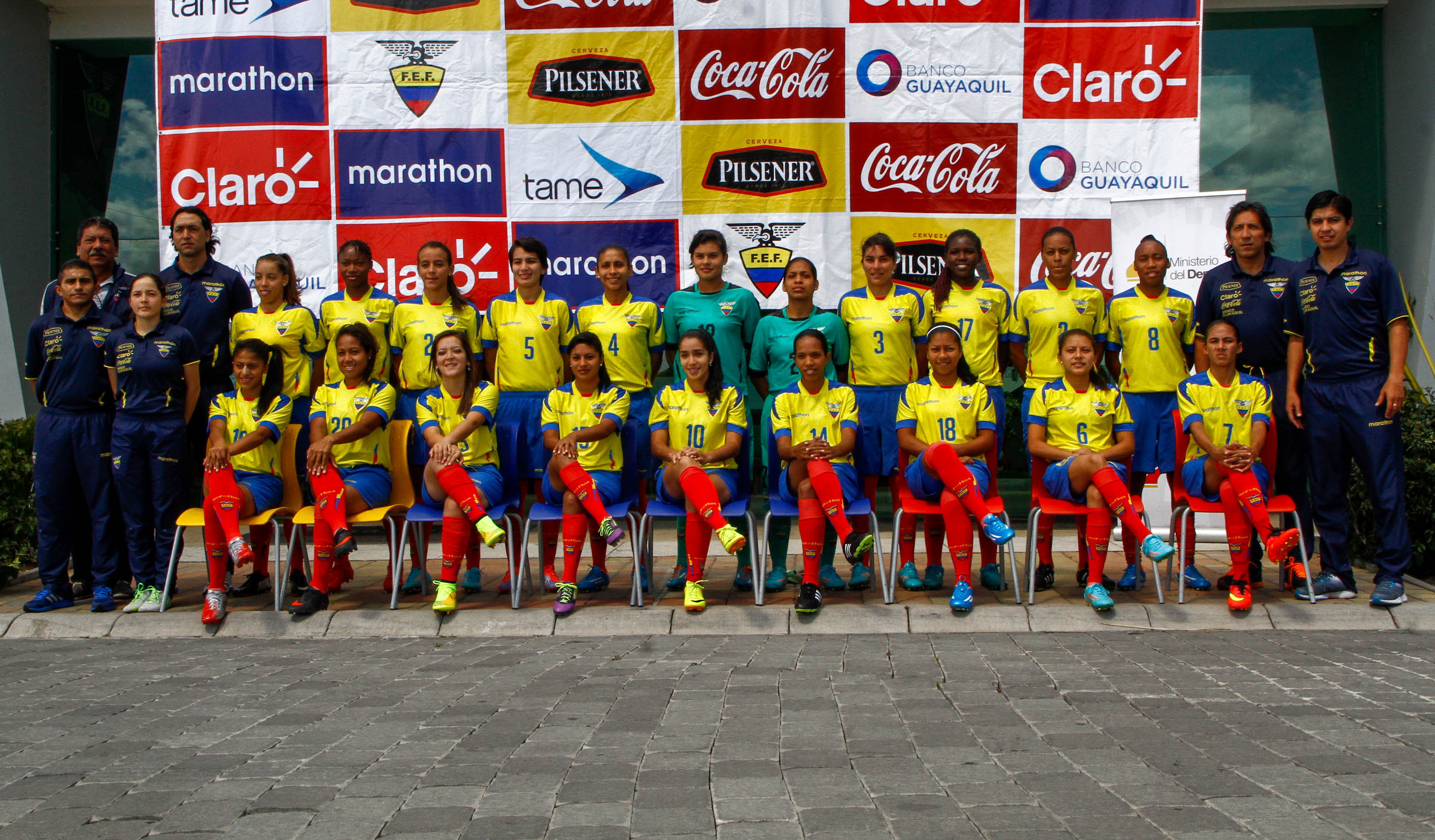

Personal information
- Full name: Carina Elizabeth Caicedo Caicedo
- Date of birth: 23 July 1987 (age 39)
- Place of birth: Quitol, Ecuador
- Height: 1.72 m (5 ft 8 in)
- Positions: Midfielder; forward

Team information
- Current team: LDU Quito
- Number: 16

Senior career*
Years	Team	Apps	(Gls)
2013–2017	Quito FC		
2017–2018	Santo Domingo		
2018–2019	Quito FC	12	(5)
2019	Ñañas	24	(12)
2020	El Nacional		
2021	Dragonas IDV		
2022	Quito FC		
2023	Dragonas IDV		
2023	Atlético Nacional		
2023–	Atlético Nacional		

International career^{‡}
2014–2022	Ecuador	9	(1)
- * Club domestic league appearances and goals as of 28 September 2019 ‡ National team caps and goals as of 15:47, 17 June 2015 (UTC)

Carina Elizabeth Caicedo Caicedo (born 23 July 1987) is an Ecuadorian footballer who plays as a midfielder for LDU Quito.

== International career ==
Caicedo was part of the Ecuadorian squad for the 2015 FIFA Women's World Cup.

== International goals ==
No.	Date	Venue	Opponent	Score	Result	Competition
1.	18 February 2023	Estadio Juan Carlos Durán, Santa Cruz de la Sierra, Bolivia	Bolivia	3–0	5–0	Friendly
2.	18 February 2023	Estadio Juan Carlos Durán, Santa Cruz de la Sierra, Bolivia	Bolivia	4–0	5–0	Friendly
3.	21 February 2023	Estadio Juan Carlos Durán, Santa Cruz de la Sierra, Bolivia	Bolivia	5–1	5–1	Friendly
