= 2019 Superliga Femenina (Ecuador) =

Serie A Femenina
- Season: 2019
- Champions: C.D. Cuenca (1st title)
- Relegated: ESPUCE; Fuerza Amarilla; Delfín; Universidad Católica; Mushuc Runa; Aucas
- Copa Libertadores: C.D. Cuenca; Ñañas
- Matches played: 234
- Goals scored: 828 (3.54 per match)
- Top goalscorer: Madelin Riera (44 goals)

2019 Superliga Femenina was the inaugural edition of the Superliga Femenina and the 13th overall season of top division women's football in Ecuador. The season started on 26 April 2019 and ended on 28 September 2019. Deportivo Cuenca won their first title.

== First stage ==
=== Group A ===
==== Standings ====
Pos	Team	Pld	W	D	L	GF	GA	GD	Pts	Qualification or relegation
1	Deportivo Cuenca	20	17	1	2	93	11	+82	52	Advance to knockout phase
2	UPS Carneras	20	16	1	3	52	15	+37	49	Advance to knockout phase
3	Barcelona	20	14	6	0	57	11	+46	48	Advance to knockout phase
4	Emelec	20	10	3	7	65	20	+45	33	Advance to knockout phase
5	Técnico Universitario	20	8	4	8	28	43	−15	28	
6	Olmedo	20	7	4	9	27	40	−13	25	
7	Macará	20	4	6	10	18	30	−12	18	
8	Guayaquil City	20	4	6	10	16	29	−13	18	
9	Fuerza Amarilla	20	4	1	15	18	128	−110	13	
10	Delfín	20	3	3	14	28	44	−16	12	
11	Mushuc Runa (Note: Mushuc Runa were deducted three points for not fielding two U-19 players in their round 15 match as FEF regulation indicate.)	20	4	3	13	24	55	−31	12	

Rules for classification: 1) points; 2) head-to-head points; 3) goal difference; 4) number of goals scored

==== Results ====
Home \ Away	BSC	CAR	CUE	DEL	EME	FAM	GUA	MAC	MRU	OLM	TEC
Barcelona	—	1–0	1–0	6–0	1–0	5–0	0–0	2–0	7–0	1–1	6–0
UPS Carneras	1–2	—	3–0	5–1	3–0	9–1	1–0	0–0	4–0	2–1	3–1
Cuenca	2–2	1–0	—	6–0	5–3	21–1	3–0	7–0	3–0	13–0	7–0
Delfín	0–3	1–2	0–3	—	0–2	12–0	2–0	0–0	7–0	0–1	0–0
Emelec	1–2	0–1	1–2	5–0	—	21–0	2–0	2–0	6–1	6–0	6–1
Fuerza Amarilla	0–6	0–1	0–7	3–1	0–7	—	2–0	2–1	0–3	2–1	2–5
Guayaquil City	1–1	1–2	0–6	2–1	0–0	0–0	—	3–0	3–0	2–1	0–0
Macará	3–3	1–4	0–1	2–1	2–0	5–0	0–0	—	0–2	0–0	0–1
Mushuc Runa	2–2	2–5	0–3	2–2	0–1	8–1	3–2	0–3	—	1–2	0–0
Olmedo	0–3	1–2	0–1	1–0	0–0	8–1	3–2	0–0	3–0	—	2–3
Técnico Universitario	0–3	1–4	0–2	1–0	2–2	7–3	2–0	2–1	1–0	1–2	—

Source: Ecuadorian Football Federation - Femenino - Partidos y resultados
Legend: Blue = home team win; Yellow = draw; Red = away team win.

=== Group B ===
==== Standings ====
Pos	Team	Pld	W	D	L	GF	GA	GD	Pts	Qualification or relegation
1	Independiente	20	18	2	0	69	9	+60	56	Advance to knockout phase
2	El Nacional	20	16	3	1	66	9	+57	51	Advance to knockout phase
3	Ñañas	20	14	3	3	51	14	+37	45	Advance to knockout phase
4	L.D.U. Quito	20	11	5	4	43	19	+24	38	Advance to knockout phase
5	Quito FC	20	9	1	10	27	36	−9	28	
6	América de Quito	20	7	2	11	30	35	−5	23	
7	ESPE	20	6	3	11	21	38	−17	21	
8	Deportivo Santo Domingo	20	6	2	12	28	49	−21	20	
9	ESPUCE	20	3	4	13	14	64	−50	13	
10	Universidad Católica	20	3	3	14	15	64	−49	12	
11	Aucas	20	2	2	16	7	62	−55	8	

Rules for classification: 1) points; 2) head-to-head points; 3) goal difference; 4) number of goals scored

==== Results ====
Home \ Away	AME	AUC	DSD	ELN	ESP	PUC	IND	LDU	ÑAÑ	QUI	UCA
América de Quito	—										
Aucas	4–0	—	0–3				0–7				
Deportivo Santo Domingo			—	1–3						1–3	
El Nacional	3–0	12–0		—							
ESPE					—			1–1	1–3		
ESPUCE			1–4	0–6		—					
Independiente						8–0	—		2–0		
L.D.U. Quito						5–1		—			
Ñañas	1–0								—		1–0
Quito FC							0–2	0–0		—	
Universidad Católica					0–1					0–1	—

Source: Ecuadorian Football Federation - Femenino - Partidos y resultados
Legend: Blue = home team win; Yellow = draw; Red = away team win.

=== Aggregate table ===
Pos	Team	Pld	W	D	L	GF	GA	GD	Pts	Qualification or relegation
1	Independiente	20	18	2	0	69	9	+60	56	Advance to knockout phase
2	Deportivo Cuenca	20	17	1	2	93	11	+82	52	Advance to knockout phase
3	El Nacional	20	16	3	1	66	9	+57	51	Advance to knockout phase
4	UPS Carneras	20	16	1	3	52	15	+37	49	Advance to knockout phase
5	Barcelona	20	14	6	0	57	11	+46	48	Advance to knockout phase
6	Ñañas	20	14	3	3	51	14	+37	45	Advance to knockout phase
7	L.D.U. Quito	20	11	5	4	43	19	+24	38	Advance to knockout phase
8	Emelec	20	10	3	7	65	20	+45	33	Advance to knockout phase
9	Quito FC	20	9	1	10	27	36	−9	28	
10	Técnico Universitario	20	8	4	8	28	43	−15	28	
11	Olmedo	20	7	4	9	27	40	−13	25	
12	América de Quito	20	7	2	11	30	35	−5	23	
13	ESPE	20	6	3	11	21	38	−17	21	
14	Deportivo Santo Domingo	20	6	2	12	28	49	−21	20	
15	Macará	20	4	6	10	18	30	−12	18	
16	Guayaquil City	20	4	6	10	16	29	−13	18	
17	ESPUCE	20	3	4	13	14	64	−50	13	Relegation to Serie B
18	Fuerza Amarilla	20	4	1	15	18	128	−110	13	Relegation to Serie B
19	Delfín	20	3	3	14	28	44	−16	12	Relegation to Serie B
20	Universidad Católica	20	3	3	14	15	64	−49	12	Relegation to Serie B
21	Mushuc Runa (Note: Mushuc Runa were deducted three points for not fielding two U-19 players in their round 15 match as FEF regulation indicate.)	20	4	3	13	24	55	−31	12	Relegation to Serie B
22	Aucas	20	2	2	16	7	62	−55	8	Relegation to Serie B

Rules for classification: 1) points; 2) head-to-head points; 3) goal difference; 4) number of goals scored

== Knockout phase ==
=== Bracket ===
Quarter-finals
2	D. Cuenca	3	2	5
7	L.D.U. Quito	0	1	1
3	El Nacional	2	1	3
5	Barcelona	2	2	4
1	Independiente	2	1	3
8	Emelec	0	0	0
4	UPS Carneras	0	1	1
6	Ñañas	1	2	3

Semi-finals
2	D. Cuenca	3	2	5
5	Barcelona	0	0	0
1	Independiente	0	0	0
6	Ñañas	0	2	2

Finals
2	D. Cuenca	2	2	4
6	Ñañas	1	0	1

=== Matches ===
==== Quarter-finals ====
Team 1	Agg.	Team 2	1st leg	2nd leg
D. Cuenca	5–1	L.D.U. Quito	3-0	2-1
El Nacional	3–4	Barcelona	2-2	1-2
Independiente del Valle	3–0	Emelec	2-0	1-0
UPS Carneras	1–3	Ñañas	0-1	1-2

==== Semi-finals ====
Team 1	Agg.	Team 2	1st leg	2nd leg
D. Cuenca	5–0	Barcelona	3-0	2-0
Independiente del Valle	0–2	Ñañas	0-0	0-2

==== Finals ====
The first leg match of the final was played on 21 September 2019 at the Casa de la Selección (Ecuador's national football team headquarters) in Quito; and the second leg on 28 September 2019 at the Alejandro Serrano Aguilar Stadium in Cuenca.

21 September 2019
11:30

Ñañas	1–2	D. Cuenca
Laura Housser 84'	Report	Gianinna Lattanzio 52'; Madelin Riera 72'

Casa de la Selección, Quito

28 September 2019
19:00

D. Cuenca	2–0	Ñañas
Madelin Riera 77', 84'	Report

Alejandro Serrano Aguilar Stadium, Cuenca

D. Cuenca won 4–1 on aggregate.

== See also ==
- 2019 in Ecuadorian football
