= Nayely Bolaños =

Ecuadorian footballer (born 2003)

Personal information
- Full name: Nayely Nahomi Bolaños Vera
- Date of birth: 25 February 2003 (age 23)
- Place of birth: Ventanas, Ecuador
- Height: 1.70 m (5 ft 7 in)
- Position: Forward

Team information
- Current team: León
- Number: 9

Senior career*
Years	Team	Apps	(Gls)
2016–2018	7 de Febrero		(8)
2018–2019	El Nacional	38	(41)
2020–2021	Cuenca	23	(16)
2022	Independiente del Valle		
2023	Atlético Madrid		
2024	Independiente del Valle	6	(4)
2025–2026	UNAM	35	(11)
2026–	León	1	(1)

International career^{‡}
2020–	Ecuador	11	(7)
- * Club domestic league appearances and goals as of 2 August 2026 ‡ National team caps and goals as of 4 June 2024

Nayely Nahomi Bolaños Vera (born 25 February 2003) is an Ecuadorian footballer who plays as a forward for Liga MX Femenil side León and the Ecuador women's national team.

== Biography ==
Bolaños learned to play football at the age of 10, participating in youth male football schools that were in her native Ventanas since she showed great conditions in the game. On countless occasions she had difficulties in these schools because the boys resisted a woman playing with them. This only made Bolaños take more courage to fight and win a place on the pitch. In 2016, at the age of 13 years, she debuted with the Club 7 de Febrero where she stayed for 3 years. At the beginning of 2019, María José Benítez, who is the coordinator of the El Nacional, spoke with Bolaños' parents so that she can be part of the Puras Criollas and thus play the nascent Superliga Femenina.

== Club career ==
=== Club 7 de Febrero ===
Bolaños started playing at Club 7 de Febrero of Ventanas, where she played until 2018.

=== El Nacional ===
In 2019, Bolaños signed for El Nacional, since then she has been the undisputed starter, scoring goals in important matches and being a figure in these matches, she also helped her team to be crowned champion of Superliga Femenina in 2020. Likewise, she was part of the women's national under-16, to compete in Torneo Evolución, which was organized by CONMEBOL in the city of Asunción.

== International goals ==
No.	Date	Venue	Opponent	Score	Result	Competition
1.	8 July 2022	Estadio Pascual Guerrero, Cali, Colombia	Bolivia	1–0	6–1	2022 Copa América Femenina
2.	8 July 2022	Estadio Pascual Guerrero, Cali, Colombia	Bolivia	6–1	6–1	2022 Copa América Femenina
3.	13 July 2024	Estadio Jaime Morón León, Cartagena, Colombia	Colombia	2–0	2–1	Friendly
4.	25 October 2024	CHUBB Arena, Quito, Ecuador	Chile	1–1	1–1	Friendly
5.	19 February 2025	Estadio Rodrigo Paz Delgado, Quito, Eucador	El Salvador	1–0	4–1	Friendly
6.	8 April 2025	Estadio Alejandro Morera Soto, Alajuela, Costa Rica	Costa Rica	1–0	3–3	Friendly
7.	8 April 2025	Estadio Alejandro Morera Soto, Alajuela, Costa Rica	Costa Rica	2–1	3–3	Friendly
8.	28 June 2025	Estadio Rodrigo Paz Delgado, Quito, Ecuador	Guatemala	1–0	4–0	Friendly
9.	28 June 2025	Estadio Rodrigo Paz Delgado, Quito, Ecuador	Guatemala	4–0	4–0	Friendly
10.	15 July 2025	Estadio Banco Guayaquil, Quito, Ecuador	Peru	2–0	3–1	2025 Copa América Femenina
11.	21 July 2025	Estadio Banco Guayaquil, Quito, Ecuador	Chile	1–0	1–2	2025 Copa América Femenina
12.	28 October 2025	Estadio Rodrigo Paz Delgado, Quito, Ecuador	Colombia	1–1	1–2	2025–26 CONMEBOL Liga de Naciones Femenina
13.	18 April 2026	Estadio Olímpico Atahualpa, Quito, Ecuador	Peru	1–0	1–0	2025–26 CONMEBOL Liga de Naciones Femenina
14.	5 June 2026	Estadio Nacional Julio Martínez Prádanos, Santiago, Chile	Chile	2–1	2–1	2025–26 CONMEBOL Liga de Naciones Femenina

== Honours ==
=== Club ===
El Nacional

- Superliga Femenina: 2020

Cuenca

- Superliga Femenina: 2021
