= Valeria Palacios =

Ecuadorian footballer (born 1991)

Personal information
- Full name: Ana Valeria Palacios Mendoza
- Date of birth: 16 February 1991 (age 35)
- Place of birth: Portoviejo, Ecuador
- Height: 1.56 m (5 ft 1 1/2 in)
- Position: Midfielder

Team information
- Current team: El Nacional

Senior career*
Years	Team	Apps	(Gls)
2006	Cristo Rey		
2006	Manabi selection	5	(5)
2007–2010	Cristo Rey		
2009	→ Deportivo Quito (loan)		
2010–2013	Pichincha selection	6	(8)
2011	→ LDU Quito (loan)		
2013	Guayas selection		
2013–2015	Rocafuerte		
2015-2016	Club Espuce		
2017-2020	Siente de febrero		
2021-	El Nacional		

International career^{‡}
2008	Ecuador U17		
2007–2018	Ecuador	31	(0)
- * Club domestic league appearances and goals as of 15:56, 22 June 2015 (UTC) ‡ National team caps and goals as of 15:56, 17 June 2015 (UTC)

Ana Valeria Palacios Mendoza (born 16 February 1991), known as Valeria Palacios, is an Ecuadorian footballer who plays for El Nacional. She played for Ecuador at the 2015 FIFA Women's World Cup.

== International career ==
Palacios represented Ecuador at the 2008 South American U-17 Women's Championship.
