= Ingrid Rodríguez =

Ecuadorian footballer (born 1991)

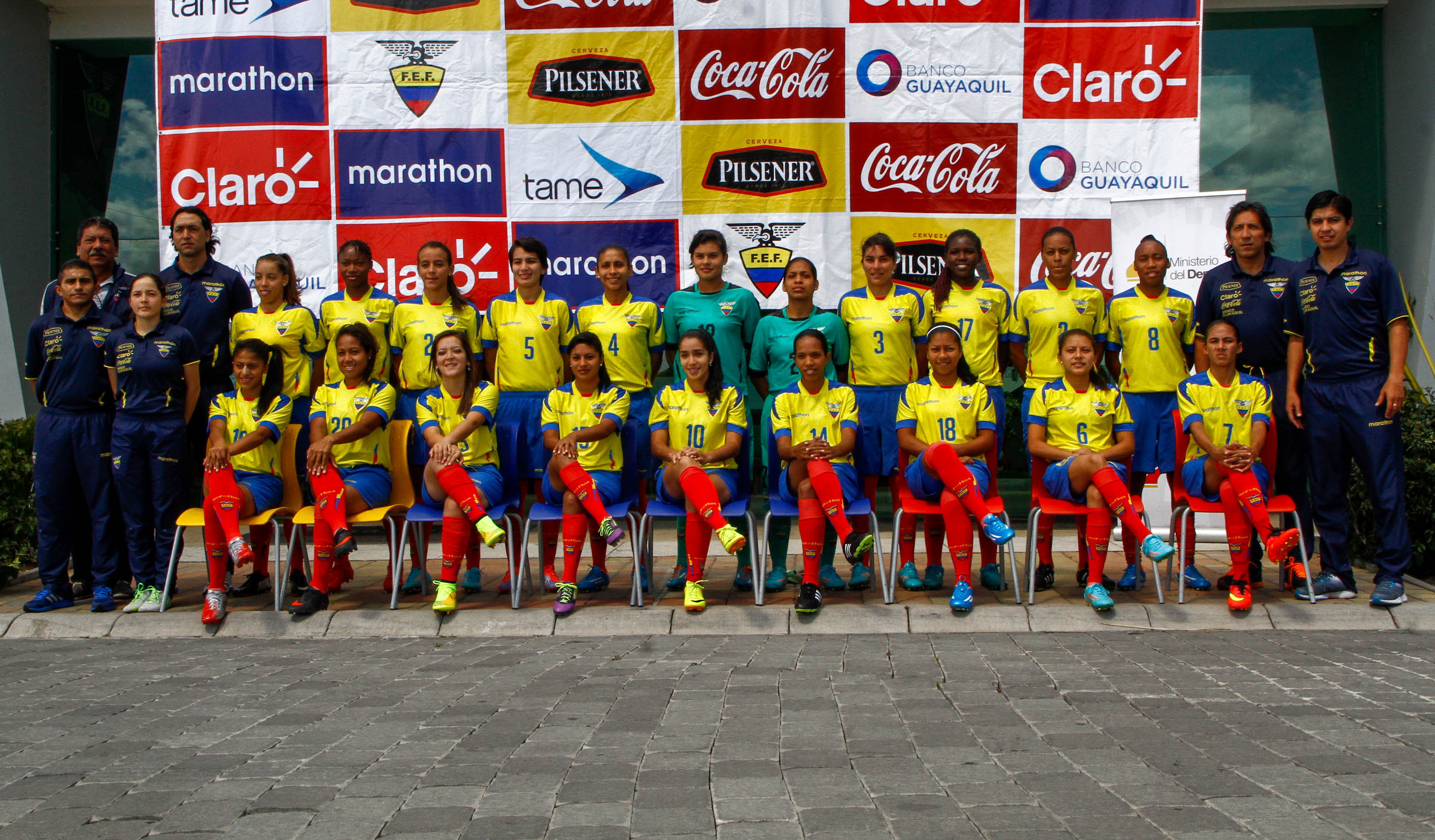

Personal information
- Full name: Ingrid Roxana Rodríguez Alvarado
- Date of birth: 24 November 1991 (age 34)
- Place of birth: Guayaquil, Ecuador
- Height: 1.58 m (5 ft 2 in)
- Position: Defender

Team information
- Current team: El Nacional

Youth career
- 2007–2010: Guayas selection

Senior career*
Years	Team	Apps	(Gls)
2010–2013	Guayas selection	5	(0)
2010	→ Deportivo Quito (loan)		
2011	→ LDU Quito (loan)		
2013–2015	Rocafuerte FC		
2015–2018	Unión Española		
2019-2020	Deportivo Santo Domingo		
2021-	El Nacional		

International career^{‡}
2008	Ecuador U17		
2014-2022	Ecuador	37	(6)
- * Club domestic league appearances and goals as of 19:50, 22 June 2015 (UTC) ‡ National team caps and goals as of 15:35, 17 June 2015 (UTC)

Ingrid Roxana Rodríguez Alvarado (born 24 November 1991) is an Ecuadorian professional footballer who plays for El Nacional. She was part of the Ecuadorian squad at the 2015 FIFA Women's World Cup.

== International career ==
Rodríguez represented Ecuador at the 2008 South American U-17 Women's Championship.
