= Superliga Femenina (disambiguation) =

Superliga Femenina is the top division of Spanish women's football, now called the Primera División de la Liga de Fútbol Femenino.

Superliga Femenina may also refer to:

- Superliga Femenina, the top level league competition for women's football teams in Ecuador
- Venezuelan women's football championship, the top level league competition for women's football in Venezuela
