= Peyton Trayer =

American soccer player (born 2008)

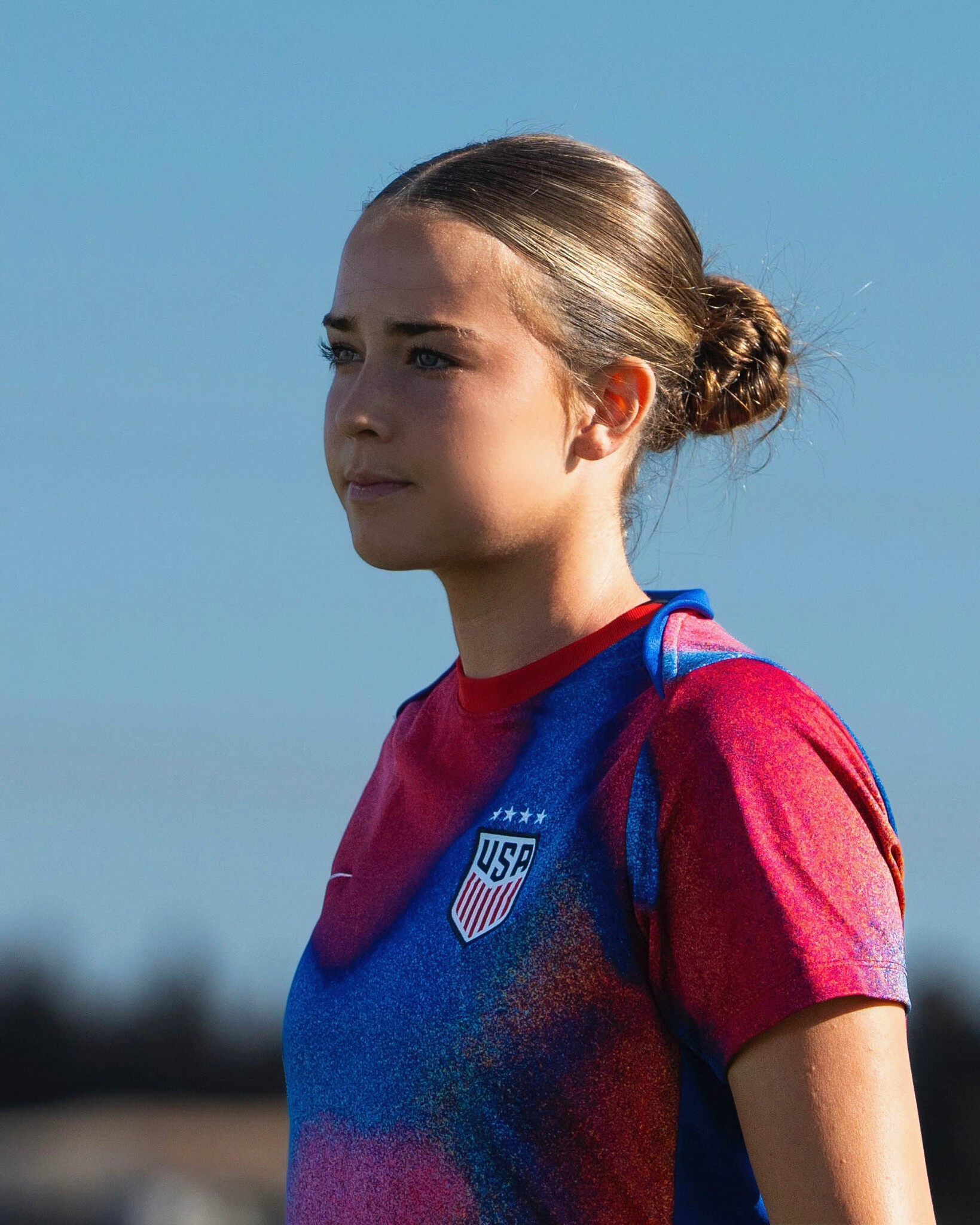
- Trayer at the 2025 U17 Women's World Cup

Personal information
- Full name: Peyton Amber Trayer
- Date of birth: March 11, 2008 (age 18)
- Height: 5 ft 11 in (1.80 m)
- Position: Goalkeeper

Team information
- Current team: North Carolina Tar Heels
- Number: 11

Youth career
- 2017-2026: Slammers FC HB Køge
- 2022–2026: Santa Margarita Eagles

College career
Years	Team	Apps	(Gls)
2026–	North Carolina Tar Heels	0	(0)

International career^{‡}
2025–	United States U-17	6	(0)
- ‡ National team caps and goals as of October 18, 2025

Peyton Amber Trayer (born March 11, 2008) is an American college soccer player who plays as a goalkeeper for the North Carolina Tar Heels. She represented the United States at the 2025 FIFA U-17 Women's World Cup.

== Early life ==
Trayer grew up in Aliso Viejo, California. She helped lead Santa Margarita Catholic High School to the CIF Southern Section Division 1 title as a freshman in 2023 and was named the CIF-SS Division 1 player of the year. She helped the team defend their regional title and finish as division runners-up as a sophomore in 2024, earning first-team All-County honors for a second time. During high school, she also played club soccer for Slammers FC HB Køge, earning ECNL all-conference honors. She committed to play college soccer for North Carolina during her junior year. In early 2025, after attending a training camp in Brazil organized by the Kansas City Current, she was ruled ineligible for the rest of her junior high school season. Current general manager Caitlin Carducci said the CIF ruling was wrong as the camp was not a tryout. During her senior year, Trayer took online classes and trained with the NWSL's Gotham FC and Seattle Reign FC to prepare for the 2025 FIFA U-17 Women's World Cup.

== College career ==
Trayer enrolled at the University of North Carolina in the spring of 2026.

== International career ==
Trayer was called up to the United States under-17 team for the 2025 CONCACAF Women's U-17 Championship qualification tournament. She made her international debut in the last qualifier against El Salvador and saved a penalty in the 7–0 win. She then helped the under-17s to the title at the 4 Nations Tournament, playing the second half in the 1–0 final win over Mexico. She was named to the roster for the 2025 FIFA U-17 Women's World Cup, making one start in a 5–0 win over Norway.

== Personal life ==
Trayer is the daughter of Kari (née Hogancamp) and Greg Trayer and has two siblings. Her parents were college athletes at the University of Massachusetts, where her mother played volleyball and her father played water polo.
