= Guayaquil City F.C. Femenino =

Guayaquil City
- Full name: Guayaquil City Fútbol Club Fememino
- Nickname(s): El Equipo de la Ciudad; Ciudadanas
- Founded: 23 July 2018; 6 years ago
- Ground: Estadio Christian Benítez Betancourt, Guayaquil, Ecuador
- Capacity: 10,152
- President: Iván Mendoza
- Manager: Daniel Vera
- League: Superliga Femenina
- 2020: 11th
- Website: http://www.guayaquilcityfc.com/
Home colours	Away colours

Guayaquil City Fútbol Club Femenino is the women's football section of the Ecuadorian football club of the same name, based in Guayaquil. They are currently a member of the Superliga Femenina, where they participated for the first time in 2019, obtaining a good performance in the first professional category of women's football.

The women's section was created in 2018 for participation as a founding member of the Superliga Femenina, the premier league of professional women's football in Ecuador. It is organized by the Ecuadorian Football Federation. Since the first season, it has been a constant participant to the point of being the third largest force in the city and the region.

Their traditional rivals are Barcelona and Emelec with whom they dispute the rivalry for sharing in their female duels.

== Stadium ==
Estadio Christian Benítez Betancourt is the stadium where Guayaquil City plays home. It was inaugurated on 20 February 2014 and has a statutory capacity of 10,152 people. It is located in Parque Samanes in the city of Guayaquil, on Av. Paseo del Parque.
