= Natalie Chudowsky =

American soccer player (born 2008)

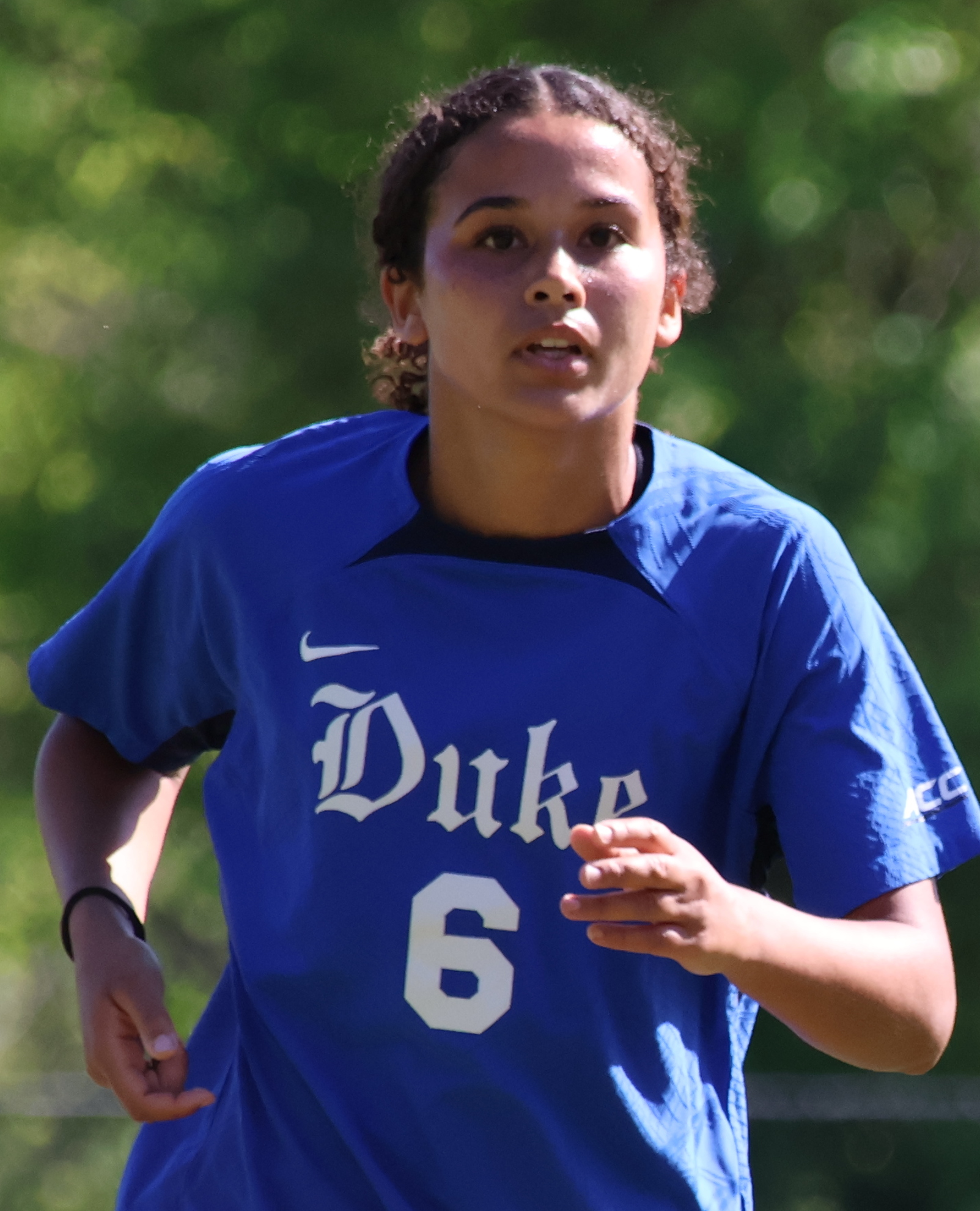
- Chudowsky with Duke in 2026

Personal information
- Full name: Natalie Grace Chudowsky
- Date of birth: February 14, 2008 (age 18)
- Height: 5 ft 7 in (1.70 m)
- Positions: Defensive midfielder; center back

Team information
- Current team: Duke Blue Devils

Youth career
- New York Soccer Club
- 2022–2024: Staples Wreckers

College career
| Years | Team | Apps | (Gls) |
| 2026– | Duke Blue Devils | 0 | (0) |

International career^{‡}
| 2022 | Dominican Republic U-15 | | |
| 2023 | United States U-15 | 2 | (0) |
| 2025– | United States U-17 | 6 | (1) |
- ‡ National team caps and goals as of October 18, 2025

Natalie Grace Chudowsky (born February 14, 2008) is an American college soccer player who plays as a midfielder or defender for the Duke Blue Devils. She was briefly a Dominican Republic youth international before switching to the United States, which she represented at the 2025 FIFA U-17 Women's World Cup.

== Early life ==
Chudowsky grew up in Westport, Connecticut, where she played high school soccer at Staples High School. She primarily played attacking midfielder in high school. She scored 16 goals as a freshman in 2022 while helping lead Staples to the Class LL state title, earning second-team all-state honors. She scored twice in the state semifinals and had the opening goal in the 4–1 final win over Cheshire. She was named first-team all-state in both of the following seasons, racking up 62 goals and 59 assists in her high school career, and returning twice to the state semifinals. She committed to play college soccer for Duke before her junior year. She opted out of her senior season to prepare for the 2025 FIFA U-17 Women's World Cup by training with National Women's Soccer League (NWSL) club Gotham FC and the New York Soccer Club boys' team.

== International career ==
Chudowsky represented her mother's country, the Dominican Republic, at the 2022 CONCACAF Girls' U-15 Championship. Her performances attracted attention from the United States Soccer Federation, leading to call-ups with the United States under-15 team. She started all three of the under-17 team's games during 2025 CONCACAF Women's U-17 Championship qualification. She was then named to the roster for the 2025 FIFA U-17 Women's World Cup, playing in two games.

== Personal life ==
Chudowsky is the daughter of Walter Chudowsky and Elena Perez-Chudowsky and has an older sister. She is of Dominican descent through her mother. Her father played college soccer for Columbia, and her sister, Evelyn, plays for Cornell and was also a Dominican Republic youth international.
