= 2025 CONCACAF Women's U-17 Championship qualification =

2025 Concacaf Women’s U-17 Qualifiers
Tournament details
- Host country: Dominican Republic; Nicaragua; Puerto Rico; Trinidad and Tobago
- Dates: 27 January – 1 February
- Teams: 22
- Venue: 4 (in 4 host cities)

Tournament statistics
- Matches played: 30
- Goals scored: 142 (4.73 per match)
- Top scorer(s): (El Salvador) Maya Buerger (8 goals)

The CONCACAF U-17 Women's World Cup qualification, officially called 2025 Concacaf Women’s U-17 Qualifiers Round one, was the qualifying phase for the final round. Twenty-two teams competed for eight spots, joining the four highest-seeded teams in the competition, the United States, Mexico, Canada, and Haiti.

== Format changes ==
Starting in 2025, the top four ranked teams automatically qualified for the final tournament and teams ranked fifth and below competed in qualification. In qualification participating teams were split into six groups. After a round-robin tournament, each group winner and the top two runners-up qualified for the final tournament in March/April 2025. The final tournament was organised into three groups of four, with each group winner and the highest-ranked second place team qualifying for the 2025 FIFA U-17 Women's World Cup.

== Draw ==
The draw for the group stage took place on 16 October 2024 at the CONCACAF Headquarters in Miami. The teams were seeded based on the CONCACAF Women's Under-17 Ranking as of 1 March 2024.

| Pot 1 | Pot 2 | Pot 3 | Pot 4 |
|---|---|---|---|
| Costa Rica; Puerto Rico; El Salvador; Jamaica; Panama; Trinidad and Tobago | Nicaragua; Honduras; Bermuda; Dominican Republic; Cuba; Guatemala | Grenada; Curaçao; Saint Kitts and Nevis; Guyana; Cayman Islands; Belize | U.S. Virgin Islands; Anguilla; Turks and Caicos Islands; Saint Vincent and the Grenadines |

== Groups ==
The winners of each group and the two highest-ranking runners-up qualified for the final round. All matches were played at four different locations: Group A were hosted in Puerto Rico, Group B were hosted in Trinidad and Tobago, Group C & F were hosted in Dominican Republic, and Group D and E were hosted in Nicaragua.

Tiebreakers

The ranking of teams in each group was determined as follows:

1. Points obtained in all group matches;
2. Goal difference in all group matches;
3. Number of goals scored in all group matches;
4. Points obtained in the matches played between the teams in question;
5. Goal difference in the matches played between the teams in question;
6. Number of goals scored in the matches played between the teams in question;
7. Fair play points in all group matches;
8. Latest Concacaf Women’s Under-17 Ranking.

=== Group A ===
| Pos | Team | Pld | W | D | L | GF | GA | GD | Pts | Qualification |
|---|---|---|---|---|---|---|---|---|---|---|
| 1 | Puerto Rico (H) | 3 | 3 | 0 | 0 | 6 | 1 | +5 | 9 | Final round |
| 2 | Bermuda | 3 | 2 | 0 | 1 | 8 | 3 | +5 | 6 | Final round |
| 3 | Cayman Islands | 3 | 1 | 0 | 2 | 4 | 3 | +1 | 3 | |
| 4 | Saint Vincent and the Grenadines | 3 | 0 | 0 | 3 | 1 | 12 | −11 | 0 | |

Source: CONCACAF
Rules for classification: Qualifying stage tiebreakers
(H) Hosts
27 January 2025
9:30 (10:30 UTC−4)

| Puerto Rico | 3–0 | Saint Vincent and the Grenadines |
|---|---|---|
| Garnett 3', 7'; Centeno 21' | Report |

Estadio Centroamericano, Mayagüez
Referee: Ximena Márquez (Mexico)
27 January 2025
15:00 (16:00 UTC−4)

| Bermuda | 2–0 | Cayman Islands |
|---|---|---|
| Outerbridge 43', 53' | Report |

Estadio Centroamericano, Mayagüez
Referee: Saphire Stockman (Costa Rica)

29 January 2025
9:30 (10:30 UTC−4)

| Cayman Islands | 0–1 | Puerto Rico |
|---|---|---|
| | Report | Poidomani 38' |

Estadio Centroamericano, Mayagüez
Referee: Miriam León (El Salvador)
29 January 2025
15:00 (16:00 UTC−4)

| Saint Vincent and the Grenadines | 1–5 | Bermuda |
|---|---|---|
| Hunte 31' | Report | Welch 60'; Gibbons-Thomas 62', 85'; Patton 77'; Lightbourne 89' |

Estadio Centroamericano, Mayagüez
Referee: Cecile Hinds (Trinidad and Tobago)

31 January 2025
9:30 (10:30 UTC−4)

| Puerto Rico | 2–1 | Bermuda |
|---|---|---|
| Garnett 33'; Colón 90+5' | Report | Welch 59' |

Estadio Centroamericano, Mayagüez
Referee: Ximena Márquez (Mexico)
31 January 2025
15:00 (16:00 UTC−4)

| Cayman Islands | 4–0 | Saint Vincent and the Grenadines |
|---|---|---|
| De Quintal 18', 59', 67'; O. Ridley 45+3' | Report |

Estadio Centroamericano, Mayagüez
Referee: Saphire Stockman (Costa Rica)

=== Group B ===
| Pos | Team | Pld | W | D | L | GF | GA | GD | Pts | Qualification |
|---|---|---|---|---|---|---|---|---|---|---|
| 1 | Honduras | 3 | 3 | 0 | 0 | 7 | 0 | +7 | 9 | Final round |
| 2 | Trinidad and Tobago (H) | 3 | 2 | 0 | 1 | 7 | 1 | +6 | 6 | Final round |
| 3 | Belize | 3 | 1 | 0 | 2 | 3 | 4 | −1 | 3 | |
| 4 | U.S. Virgin Islands | 3 | 0 | 0 | 3 | 0 | 12 | −12 | 0 | |

Source: CONCACAF
Rules for classification: Qualifying stage tiebreakers
(H) Hosts
27 January 2025
16:00 (17:00 UTC−4)

| Honduras | 2–0 | Belize |
|---|---|---|
| Sánchez 6'; Merriam 90+4' | Report |

Ato Boldon Stadium, Couva
Referee: Kenisha Prescott (Guyana)
27 January 2025
19:00 (20:00 UTC−4)

| Trinidad and Tobago | 5–0 | U.S. Virgin Islands |
|---|---|---|
| Martin 27', 30', 60', 67'; Lee Chong 89' | Report |

Ato Boldon Stadium, Couva
Referee: Glenda López (Guatemala)

29 January 2025
16:00 (17:00 UTC−4)

| U.S. Virgin Islands | 0–4 | Honduras |
|---|---|---|
| | Report | Sánchez 10', 16'; Merriam 54'; Mercado 67' |

Ato Boldon Stadium, Couva
Referee: Portia Davis (Antigua and Barbuda)
29 January 2025
19:00 (20:00 UTC−4)

| Belize | 0–2 | Trinidad and Tobago |
|---|---|---|
| | Report | Steele 30'; Gittens 49' |

Ato Boldon Stadium, Couva
Referee: Smeedly Saint-Jean (Haiti)

31 January 2025
16:00 (17:00 UTC−4)

| Belize | 3–0 | U.S. Virgin Islands |
|---|---|---|
| Smith 13', 34', 60' | Report |

Ato Boldon Stadium, Couva
Referee: Kenisha Prescott (Guyana)
31 January 2025
19:00 (20:00 UTC−4)

| Trinidad and Tobago | 0–1 | Honduras |
|---|---|---|
| | Report | Ramírez Guardiola 76' |

Ato Boldon Stadium, Couva
Referee: Glenda López (Guatemala)

=== Group C ===
| Pos | Team | Pld | W | D | L | GF | GA | GD | Pts | Qualification |
|---|---|---|---|---|---|---|---|---|---|---|
| 1 | Panama | 3 | 3 | 0 | 0 | 20 | 4 | +16 | 9 | Final round |
| 2 | Cuba | 3 | 2 | 0 | 1 | 9 | 9 | 0 | 6 | |
| 3 | Guyana | 3 | 1 | 0 | 2 | 10 | 6 | +4 | 3 | |
| 4 | Turks and Caicos Islands | 3 | 0 | 0 | 3 | 1 | 21 | −20 | 0 | |

Source: CONCACAF
Rules for classification: Qualifying stage tiebreakers
27 January 2025
16:00 (17:00 UTC−4)

| Cuba | 2–1 | Guyana |
|---|---|---|
| López 45'; Calvo 64' | Report | Chasles 56' |

Estadio Félix Sánchez, Santo Domingo, Dominican Republic
Referee: Itzel Hernández (Mexico)
27 January 2025
19:00 (20:00 UTC−4)

| Panama | 9–0 | Turks and Caicos Islands |
|---|---|---|
| Arosemena 3'; Zapata 31'; Onodera 38', 54'; Machado 68'; Yee 77'; Mow 79', 86'; Montenegro 90+2' | Report |

Estadio Félix Sánchez, Santo Domingo, Dominican Republic
Referee: Nathalya Williams (Trinidad and Tobago)

29 January 2025
16:00 (17:00 UTC−4)

| Turks and Caicos Islands | 0–5 | Cuba |
|---|---|---|
| | Report | Borrego 13' (pen.), 47' (pen.); Reyes 41', 83'; López 86' |

Estadio Félix Sánchez, Santo Domingo, Dominican Republic
Referee: Marjorie Ponce (Nicaragua)
29 January 2025
19:00 (20:00 UTC−4)

| Guyana | 2–3 | Panama |
|---|---|---|
| Pasvolsky 12'; Chatta 83' | Report | Mow 2'; Ovalle 7'; Magallón 73' |

Estadio Félix Sánchez, Santo Domingo, Dominican Republic
Referee: Neressa Goldson (Jamaica)

31 January 2025
16:00 (17:00 UTC−4)

| Guyana | 7–1 | Turks and Caicos Islands |
|---|---|---|
| Chasles 16', 21'; Sookdeo 20', 54'; Joseph 24', 41'; Benjamin 57' | Report | Jackson 71' |

Estadio Félix Sánchez, Santo Domingo, Dominican Republic
Referee: Nathalya Williams (Trinidad and Tobago)
31 January 2025
19:00 (20:00 UTC−4)

| Panama | 8–2 | Cuba |
|---|---|---|
| Mow 6', 12', 71'; Magallón 8', 82'; Onodera 18', 27' (pen.); Zapata 70' | Report | Calvo 24'; Orozco 44' |

Estadio Félix Sánchez, Santo Domingo, Dominican Republic
Referee: Itzel Hernández (Mexico)

=== Group D ===
| Pos | Team | Pld | W | D | L | GF | GA | GD | Pts | Qualification |
|---|---|---|---|---|---|---|---|---|---|---|
| 1 | El Salvador | 3 | 3 | 0 | 0 | 22 | 0 | +22 | 9 | Final round |
| 2 | Guatemala | 3 | 2 | 0 | 1 | 8 | 8 | 0 | 6 | |
| 3 | Curaçao | 3 | 1 | 0 | 2 | 6 | 11 | −5 | 3 | |
| 4 | Anguilla | 3 | 0 | 0 | 3 | 2 | 19 | −17 | 0 | |

Source: CONCACAF
Rules for classification: Qualifying stage tiebreakers
27 January 2025
16:00 (15:00 UTC−6)

| El Salvador | 9–0 | Anguilla |
|---|---|---|
| Carrillo 6'; Salgado 8', 40'; Buerger 30', 36', 54', 82'; Rodríguez 34'; Alvarenga 48' | Report |

Estadio Nacional, Managua, Nicaragua
Referee: Priscila Pérez (Mexico)
27 January 2025
19:00 (18:00 UTC−6)

| Guatemala | 3–1 | Curaçao |
|---|---|---|
| Mayorga 2'; Galindo 32' (pen.); Franco 88' | Report | Alexandre 15' |

Estadio Nacional, Managua, Nicaragua
Referee: Belkis Flores (Honduras)

29 January 2025
16:00 (15:00 UTC−6)

| Anguilla | 0–5 | Guatemala |
|---|---|---|
| | Report | Galindo 22'; Vanterpool 39' (o.g.); Moreno 55'; Lico 69' (o.g.); Godoy 76' |

Estadio Nacional, Managua, Nicaragua
Referee: Moïka Calme (Guadeloupe)
29 January 2025
19:00 (18:00 UTC−6)

| Curaçao | 0–6 | El Salvador |
|---|---|---|
| | Report | Carrillo 9', 17'; Buerger 15', 28'; Castro 75'; Rodríguez 83' |

Estadio Nacional, Managua, Nicaragua
Referee: Karitza Guerra (Honduras)

31 January 2025
16:00 (15:00 UTC−6)

| Curaçao | 5–2 | Anguilla |
|---|---|---|
| Cristina 25', 48', 70'; Martis Nocento 35'; Koko 60' (pen.) | Report | Gaskin 8'; McCormack-Fleming 44' (pen.) |

Estadio Nacional, Managua, Nicaragua
Referee: Belkis Flores (Honduras)
31 January 2025
19:00 (18:00 UTC−6)

| El Salvador | 7–0 | Guatemala |
|---|---|---|
| Buerger 22', 50'; Carrillo 27', 41'; Rodríguez 35'; Santos 78'; Rodríguez 86' (o.g.) | Report |

Estadio Nacional, Managua, Nicaragua
Referee: Priscila Pérez (Mexico)

=== Group E ===
| Pos | Team | Pld | W | D | L | GF | GA | GD | Pts | Qualification |
|---|---|---|---|---|---|---|---|---|---|---|
| 1 | Nicaragua (H) | 2 | 2 | 0 | 0 | 6 | 1 | +5 | 6 | Final round |
| 2 | Jamaica | 2 | 1 | 0 | 1 | 7 | 2 | +5 | 3 | |
| 3 | Saint Kitts and Nevis | 2 | 0 | 0 | 2 | 0 | 10 | −10 | 0 | |

Source: CONCACAF
Rules for classification: Qualifying stage tiebreakers
(H) Hosts
28 January 2025
19:00 (18:00 UTC−6)

| Saint Kitts and Nevis | 0–4 | Nicaragua |
|---|---|---|
| | Report | Quintanilla 20'; Zavala 43'; Miranda 87'; Lau 90+4' |

Estadio Nacional, Managua
Referee: Isabelle Duclos (Canada)

30 January 2025
19:00 (18:00 UTC−6)

| Jamaica | 6–0 | Saint Kitts and Nevis |
|---|---|---|
| Wilson 4', 58', 61'; Turner 33'; Provost-Heron 47'; Pryce 73' | Report |

Estadio Nacional, Managua
Referee: Diana Pérez (Mexico)

1 February 2025
19:00 (18:00 UTC−6)

| Nicaragua | 2–1 | Jamaica |
|---|---|---|
| Flores 3'; Canales 75' | Report | Provost-Heron 33' |

Estadio Nacional, Managua
Referee: Isabelle Duclos (Canada)

=== Group F ===
| Pos | Team | Pld | W | D | L | GF | GA | GD | Pts | Qualification |
|---|---|---|---|---|---|---|---|---|---|---|
| 1 | Costa Rica | 2 | 2 | 0 | 0 | 10 | 0 | +10 | 6 | Final round |
| 2 | Dominican Republic (H) | 2 | 1 | 0 | 1 | 5 | 3 | +2 | 3 | |
| 3 | Grenada | 2 | 0 | 0 | 2 | 0 | 12 | −12 | 0 | |

Source: CONCACAF
Rules for classification: Qualifying stage tiebreakers
(H) Hosts
28 January 2025
19:00 (20:00 UTC−4)

| Grenada | 0–5 | Dominican Republic |
|---|---|---|
| | Report | J. Martínez 16'; P. Martínez 18'; Torres 22', 49'; Espinal 25' |

Estadio Félix Sánchez, Santo Domingo
Referee: Kedeen Foster (Cayman Islands)

30 January 2025
19:00 (20:00 UTC−4)

| Costa Rica | 7–0 | Grenada |
|---|---|---|
| Paniagua 6', 40'; Ruiz 11'; Ocampo 13'; Lindo 23'; Azofeifa 31'; Chaverri 38' | Report |

Estadio Félix Sánchez, Santo Domingo
Referee: Sandra Benítez (El Salvador)

1 February 2025
19:00 (20:00 UTC−4)

| Dominican Republic | 0–3 | Costa Rica |
|---|---|---|
| | Report | Medina 28'; Alfaro 58'; Paniagua 59' |

Estadio Félix Sánchez, Santo Domingo
Referee: Marjorie Ponce (Nicaragua)

=== Ranking of second-placed teams ===
The ranking of the best second-place teams was determined using a weighted points system, prioritizing total number of points won and divided by the number of matches played.

| Pos | Grp | Team | Pld | W | D | L | GF | GA | GD | Pts | PPG | Qualification |
|---|---|---|---|---|---|---|---|---|---|---|---|---|
| 1 | B | Trinidad and Tobago | 3 | 2 | 0 | 1 | 7 | 1 | +6 | 6 | 2.00 | Final round |
| 2 | A | Bermuda | 3 | 2 | 0 | 1 | 8 | 3 | +5 | 6 | 2.00 | Final round |
| 3 | C | Cuba | 3 | 2 | 0 | 1 | 9 | 9 | 0 | 6 | 2.00 | |
| 4 | D | Guatemala | 3 | 2 | 0 | 1 | 8 | 8 | 0 | 6 | 2.00 | |
| 5 | E | Jamaica | 2 | 1 | 0 | 1 | 7 | 2 | +5 | 3 | 1.50 | |
| 6 | F | Dominican Republic | 2 | 1 | 0 | 1 | 5 | 3 | +2 | 3 | 1.50 | |

Source: CONCACAF
Rules for classification: 1. Points per game; 2. Goal difference; 3. Goals scored; 4. Fair play points; 5. Drawing of lots.

== Goalscorers ==
There were 142 goals scored in 30 matches, for an average of 4.73 goals per match.

8 goals

- (El Salvador) Maya Buerger

6 goals

- (Panama) Shaday Mow

5 goals

- (El Salvador) Angelina Carrillo

4 goals

- (Panama) Alison Onodera
- (Trinidad and Tobago) Orielle Martin

3 goals

- (Belize) Shanalee Smith
- (Cayman Islands) Clara De Quintal
- (Costa Rica) Lucía Paniagua
- (Curaçao) Ruwenna Cristina
- (El Salvador) Ava Rodríguez
- (Guyana) Alexaudria Chasles
- (Honduras) Jazlyn Sánchez
- (Jamaica) Kiana Wilson
- (Panama) Yasselis Magallón
- (Puerto Rico) Gabriella Garnett

2 goals

- (Bermuda) Milan Gibbons-Thomas
- (Bermuda) Daley Outerbridge
- (Bermuda) Evans Welch
- (Cuba) Sunehri Borrego
- (Cuba) Aneilis Calvo
- (Cuba) Yaiselis López
- (Cuba) Marianelis Reyes
- (Dominican Republic) Emma Torres
- (El Salvador) Abigaíl Salgado
- (Guatemala) Linda Galindo
- (Guyana) Anaya Joseph
- (Guyana) Devi Sookdeo
- (Honduras) Alexandra Merriam
- (Jamaica) Ella Provost-Heron
- (Panama) Kelly Zapata

1 goal

- (Anguilla) Safiyah Gaskin
- (Anguilla) Samantha McCormack-Fleming
- (Bermuda) Keyandae Lightbourne
- (Bermuda) Avani Patton
- (Cayman Islands) Olivia Ridley
- (Costa Rica) Fabiana Alfaro
- (Costa Rica) Ema Azofeifa
- (Costa Rica) Isska Chaverri
- (Costa Rica) Alisha Lindo
- (Costa Rica) Nubia Medina
- (Costa Rica) Daniela Ocampo
- (Costa Rica) Tiara Ruiz
- (Cuba) Olga Orozco
- (Curaçao) Jeandrelys Alexandre
- (Curaçao) Destiny Koko
- (Curaçao) Xiarleahmay Martis Nocento
- (Dominican Republic) Sophia Espinal
- (Dominican Republic) Jabes Martínez
- (Dominican Republic) Paige Martínez
- (El Salvador) Angie Alvarenga
- (El Salvador) Zoe Castro
- (El Salvador) Audrina Santos
- (Guatemala) Waleska Franco
- (Guatemala) Victoria Godoy
- (Guatemala) Allison Mayorga
- (Guatemala) Emily Moreno
- (Guyana) Veronica Chatta
- (Guyana) Naomi Benjamin
- (Guyana) Avril Pasvolsky
- (Honduras) Stephany Mercado
- (Honduras) Paula Ramírez Guardiola
- (Jamaica) Shauntai Pryce
- (Jamaica) Brianna Turner
- (Nicaragua) Mitzy Canales
- (Nicaragua) Olivia Flores
- (Nicaragua) Helena Lau
- (Nicaragua) Stefany Miranda
- (Nicaragua) Emma Quintanilla
- (Nicaragua) Mariela Zavala
- (Panama) Analía Arosemena
- (Panama) Thelma Machado
- (Panama) Stacy Montenegro
- (Panama) Karla Ovalle
- (Panama) Xianna Yee
- (Puerto Rico) Selymar Centeno
- (Puerto Rico) Mía Colón
- (Puerto Rico) Michaela Poidomani
- (Saint Vincent and the Grenadines) Stephanie Hunte
- (Trinidad and Tobago) Rori Gittens
- (Trinidad and Tobago) Mia Lee Chong
- (Trinidad and Tobago) Cherina Steele
- (Turks and Caicos Islands) Amika Jackson

1 own goal

- (Anguilla) Reynah Lico (against Guatemala)
- (Anguilla) Keanna Vanterpool (against Guatemala)
- (Guatemala) Yenifer Rodríguez (against El Salvador)
