= Emma Torres =

American community activist

- Born: c. 1958; Guanajato, Mexico
- Occupations: Health and community support worker
- Organization: Campesinos Sin Fronteras
- Honours: Arizona Women's Hall of Fame, 2023

Emma Torres (born c. 1959) is an American community and migrant rights activist from Arizona. In 1999 she co-founded Campesinos Sin Fronteras (Farmers without Borders), an organization dedicated to supporting immigrants and farm workers in the United States. She has spent over 40 years advocating for immigrant farm workers. In 2023, in recognition for her community involvement Torres was inducted into the Arizona Women's Hall of Fame.

== Biography ==
Emma Torres was born into a migrant farmworker family in Guanajato, Mexico. At age 5, she moved to San Luis, Arizona with her family. She first began working at farms in California when she was 13 years old. She did not finish elementary school. At age 24, her first husband died of leukemia. She could not speak English and had two children to raise. She pushed herself into education to make a better life for her children, later earning a bachelor's and masters degree.

In 1994, Torres and other local farmworkers and advocates in San Luis, Arizona organized the first Dia Del Campesino (Day of the Farm Worker) to provide community health support and access to services for workers in Yuma County, Arizona. Yuma County is one of the United States' biggest agricultural regions for winter produce and where more than 40,000 mostly migrant farmworkers work each season. Inspired by the success of this event, five years later in 1999, Torres co-founded Campesinos Sin Fronteras.

Torres has described the holistic support required by community health workers serving migrant and the low income population in her rural community,

"I might go to someone’s home to talk about diabetes, but when I get there I see they have nothing to eat, they have a child in jail, or there is a situation of domestic violence and/or extreme poverty. All of these things need to be taken into account, so the promoter needs to have very good people skills in order to understand all this and help people in all of these possible ways. You can’t come in to solve one problem and just leave all the others unsolved."

=== Campesinos Sin Fronteras ===
Campesinos Sin Fronteras
- Formation: 1999
- Legal status: Non-profit
- Headquarters: Somerton, Arizona
- Region served: Yuma County, Arizona, Arizona-Mexico border
- Services: Heath, workforce development and community services for farmworkers and low income migrant workers
- Executive Director: Emma Torres
- Website: https://www.campesinossinfronteras.com/

Campesinos Sin Fronteras offers community health support, domestic violence support, health screenings and services for farm workers and migrants who often do not qualify for health insurance in the United States. The organization additionally supports advocacy for migrant workers rights and labor laws. Campesinos Sin Fronteras has become a model program that has inspired other community support organizations for farm workers across the United States. The organization operated two community health offices in San Luis and Somerton, Arizona.

Today, Torres remains the executive director of Campesinos Sin Fronteras. She is a nationally recognized Hispanic leader and immigrant activist. Under Torres' leadership, Campesinos Sin Fronteras has collaborated with the University of Arizona, the National Institute of Health and the United States Department of Health and Human Services to expand their programming for vulnerable populations. Campesinos sin Fronteras has worked both in Arizona and across the border to help their community confront health emergencies such as the Zika virus and the COVID-19 pandemic. In 2019, the organization initiated a summer youth leadership program for teenage children of farm workers. The organization serves more than 12,000 people from the Yuma community each year.

In 2021, Torres and Campesinos Sin Fronteras expanded their work to support incoming asylum seekers and refugees in the United States. After Campesinos Sin Fronteras found that the U.S. Border Patrol was releasing asylum seekers without resources in small towns in Yuma County, the organization stepped in to help, offering community care coordinators and support in communities where no permanent migrant shelters existed.

In 2023, Torres was inducted into the Arizona Women's Hall of Fame. In 2024, Dia Del Campesino marked its 30th year anniversary event.
