= LDU Quito Femenino =

Liga de Quito Femenino
- Full name: Liga Deportiva Universitaria de Quito Femenino
- Nicknames: Las Albas (The Whites); Los Azucenas (The Lilies); La U (The U); Las Universitarias (The Universitaries)
- Founded: 11 January 1930; 96 years ago
- Ground: Estadio Rodrigo Paz Delgado (Casa Blanca)
- Capacity: 41,575
- Honorary President: Rodrigo Paz
- President: Guillermo Romero
- Manager: Jeny Herrera
- League: Superliga Femenina
- 2025: Vicechampions
- Website: http://www.ldu.com.ec
Principal colours	Alternate colours	Third colours

Liga Deportiva Universitaria de Quito Femenino, often referred to as LDU Quito Femenino, LDU Femenino or simply Liga Femenino, is an Ecuadorian women's professional football club based in Quito. They are the women's football section of LDU Quito. Since 2019, they currently compete in Superliga Femenina, the highest level of the Ecuadorian women's football league pyramid.

== Stadium ==
Like their male counterpart, LDU Quito Femenino play their home games at the Estadio Rodrigo Paz Delgado, more commonly referred to as Casa Blanca. This sports stadium is located in the Ponceano sector of Quito, on Avenida John F. Kennedy and Avenida Gustavo Lemos. The stadium has a capacity for 41,575 people, making it the second largest in Ecuador.
