= Evans Welch =

Trinidad and Tobago politician

The Honourable Evans Welch Senator

Member of the Senate of Trinidad and Tobago
- In office 28 August 2020 – 11 September 2023

Personal details
- Party: Independent

Evans Welch is a Trinidad and Tobago politician.

== Political career ==
He was appointed to the Senate as an independent senator in 2020.
