= Independiente del Valle Femenino =

Association football club in Ecuador

Independiente del Valle
- Full name: Dragonas Independiente del Valle
- Nickname(s): Dragonas (Dragons)
- Founded: 2022; 3 years ago
- Ground: Estadio Banco Guayaquil; Quito, Ecuador
- Capacity: 12,000
- Chairman: Franklin Tello Núñez
- Manager: Gustavo Pineda
- League: Superliga Femenina
- 2025: Superliga Femenina, Champions
- Website: www.independientedelvalle.com
Home colours	Away colours	Third colours

Dragonas Independiente del Valle, known simply as Independiente del Valle and Dragonas IDV, is an Ecuadorian women's football club based in Sangolquí, which plays at Estadio Banco Guayaquil. The team is the women's football section of the Independiente del Valle and currently play in the Superliga Femenina, the top-flight women's football league in the country.

== History ==
The women's football section of Independiente del Valle was established in 2022, in partnership with Universidad San Francisco. IDV became the country's first fully professional women's club. The team played directly in the first division and reached the championship final, where it lost to Club Ñañas (0-0, 1-3), who had finished behind the Dragonas during the regular season. This runner-up finish nevertheless earned the club a ticket to the 2022 Copa Libertadores Femenina, to be played in Ecuador.

During this Copa Libertadores, the Dragonas lost their first match 1-3 to the Chilean side Club Universidad de Chile, and were then swept aside 7-0 by the eventual tournament winners, Brazil's Palmeiras. They nevertheless earned their first victory in the third group match against Paraguay's Libertad-Limpeño (1-0).

== Honors ==
National

- Superliga Femenina (2): 2024, 2025
