= C.D. Cuenca Femenino =

Ecuadorean women's football club

Deportivo Cuenca
- Full name: Club Deportivo Cuenca Femenino
- Nickname(s): Las Leonas
- Founded: 4 March 1971; 54 years ago
- Ground: Estadio Alejandro Serrano Aguilar
- Capacity: 16,540
- Chairman: Galo Cárdenas
- Manager: Santiago Aguirre
- League: Superliga Femenina
- 2021: 1st, Champions
| Home colours | Away colours | Third colours |

Club Deportivo Cuenca Femenino is an Ecuadorian women's football club based in Cuenca, which plays at Estadio Alejandro Serrano Aguilar. The team is part of the C.D. Cuenca. They currently play in the Superliga Femenina, the top-flight women's football league in the country, and is one of two clubs from Cuenca to have played in the top-flight (the other being Carneras). In 2019, they participated in Copa Libertadores Femenina for the first time.

== Stadium ==
Estadio Alejandro Serrano Aguilar, owned by the Sports Federation of Azuay, is the stadium where Deportivo Cuenca plays home. It has a capacity of 16,540 people according to regulations and it is located in the city of Cuenca, on Av. Del Estadio and José Peralta.

This stadium was inaugurated on 3 November 1945 with the name of Estadio Municipal El Ejido, changing in 1971 to Estadio Alejandro Serrano Aguilar in honor of Alejandro Serrano Aguilar who was mayor of Cuenca and president of the club at the time. Since 2015, it is known by the commercial name Estadio Alejandro Serrano Aguilar Banco del Austro.

== Honors ==
National

- Superliga Femenina (2): 2019, 2021
