= C.D. El Nacional Femenino =

Ecuadorean sports club

El Nacional
- Full name: Club Deportivo El Nacional Femenino
- Nickname(s): Puras Criollas (Pure Criollos); El Bi-Tri; El Elenco Militar; La Gloria del Fútbol Ecuatoriano
- Founded: 1 June 1964; 61 years ago
- Ground: Complejo Deportivo El Sauce
- Capacity: 300
- Chairman: Lucía Vallecilla
- Manager: José María Garay
- League: Superliga Femenina
- 2025: 11th
- Website: http://www.elnacional.ec/
Principal colours	Away colours

Club Deportivo El Nacional Femenino is an Ecuadorian women's football club based in Quito, Pichincha, which plays at Complejo Deportivo El Sauce. The team is part of the sports club C.D. El Nacional. They currently play in the Superliga Femenina, the top-flight women's football league in the country.

== History ==
When Superliga Femenina was created in 2019, El Nacional participated from the beginning; they reached the quarter-finals at the end of the season. In 2020, El Nacional Femenino won their first league title by beating Club Ñañas (2-0, 2–1) in the championship final.

== Stadium ==
The main court of the Complejo Deportivo El Sauce, owned by the sports club El Nacional, is where El Nacional Femenino plays at home, it is located in the city of Quito, in the parish of Tumbaco.

== Honors ==
National

- Superliga Femenina (1): 2020
