= Superliga Femenina (Ecuador) =

- Founded: 2019
- Country: Ecuador
- Confederation: CONMEBOL
- Number of clubs: 12
- Level on pyramid: 1
- International cup: Copa Libertadores Femenina
- Current champions: Independiente del Valle (3rd title) (2026)
- Most championships: Independiente del Valle (3 titles)
- Top scorer: Madelin Riera (166 goals)
- Current: 2026

Superliga Ecuatoriana de Fútbol Femenino, also commonly known as Superliga Femenina, is the highest league of women's football in Ecuador, organized by the Ecuadorian Football Federation. Since its founding in 2019, the league has been contested for six years and five different clubs have won the league title.

== History ==
=== Background ===
In 2013, the first national amateur women's football championship endorsed by the FEF was organized. None of these 16 participating clubs belonged to or were subsidiaries of the Ecuadorian Serie A men's clubs. They are teams that have been carrying out this activity at the neighborhood or amateur level for 15 and even 20 years, there is no exact date.

=== Formation ===
In 2019, the FEF created the Women's Football Commission to be in charge of the creation of a new professional women's football league which included the participation of the Serie A teams from Ecuador. In this tournament, the teams will be able to register players in a professional manner, although it is not an obligation that the entire teams are to be.

== Sponsorship ==
On 29 August 2019, the Ecuadorian Football Federation reached an agreement with DirecTV for the transmission of the final stage of the 2019 season.

== List of champions ==
- (In bracket, title count):

Ed.	Season	Champion	Runner-up	Winning manager	Leading goalscorer(s)
1	2019	Deportivo Cuenca (1)	Ñañas	(Ecuador) Wendy Villón	(Ecuador) Madelin Riera (Deportivo Cuenca; 44 goals)
2	2020	El Nacional (1)	Ñañas	(Ecuador) Wendy Villón	(Ecuador) Madelin Riera (El Nacional; 20 goals)
3	2021	Deportivo Cuenca (2)	Ñañas	(Ecuador) Wendy Villón	(Ecuador) Madelin Riera (Deportivo Cuenca; 28 goals)
4	2022	Ñañas (1)	Independiente del Valle	(Ecuador) Francisco Ramírez	(Ecuador) Madelin Riera (Barcelona; 27 goals)
5	2023	Barcelona (1)	Independiente del Valle	(Ecuador) Wendy Villón	(Ecuador) Madelin Riera (Barcelona; 27 goals)
6	2024	Independiente del Valle (1)	Barcelona	(Colombia) Gustavo Pineda	(Ecuador) Nayely Bolaños (Independiente del Valle; 21 goals)
7	2025	Independiente del Valle (2)	LDU Quito	(Colombia) Gustavo Pineda	(Cuba) Cecil Aldana (LDU Quito; 29 goals)
8	2026	Independiente del Valle (3)	LDU Quito	(Colombia) Gustavo Pineda	(Ecuador) Yuleidi Barahona (Universidad Católica; 25 goals)

== Titles by club ==
Rank	Club	Winners	Runners-up	Winning years	Runners-up years
1	Independiente del Valle	3	2	2024, 2025, 2026	2022, 2023
1	Deportivo Cuenca	2	0	2019, 2021	—
2	Ñañas	1	3	2022	2019, 2020, 2021
2	Barcelona	1	1	2023	2024
2	El Nacional	1	0	2020	—
—	LDU Quito	—	2	—	2025, 2026
