= Club Ñañas =

Association football club in Quito, Ecuador

- Full name: Club Fútbol Femenino Ñañas
- Founded: 1 February 2016; 10 years ago
- Ground: Estadio Rumiñahui, Sangolquí
- Capacity: 7,500
- Chairman: Marcelo Vásconez
- Manager: Francisco Ramírez
- League: Superliga Femenina
- 2025: 5th
- Website: https://clubnanas.com/
Home colours	Away colours

Club Fútbol Femenino Ñañas is a women's football club based in Quito, Ecuador that competes in the Superliga Femenina.

== History ==
Fernanda Vásconez founded Club Ñañas on 1 February 2016.
