= 2023 CONCACAF Women's U-20 Championship squads =

List of the squads for the 2023 CONCACAF Women's U-20 Championship

This is a list of the squads for the 2023 CONCACAF Women's U-20 Championship in the Dominican Republic between May 24 and June 3, 2023. The 8 national teams involved in the tournament were required to register a squad of 21 players each, three of whom must be goalkeepers; only players in these squads were eligible to take part in the tournament. Players born on or after 1 January 2004 are eligible to compete.

The age listed for each player is as of 24 May 2023, the first day of the tournament.

Players marked (c) were named as captain for their national squad.

== Group A ==
=== Canada ===
Head coach: Cindy Tye

The final squad was announced on 17 May 2023.

No.	Pos.	Player	Date of birth (age)	Club
1	GK	Coralie Lallier	26 May 2005 (aged 17)	(United States Soccer Federation) University of Alabama
2	DF	Mya Archibald	31 March 2005 (aged 18)	(Canadian Soccer Association) Vancouver Whitecaps FC
3	DF	Ella Ottey	12 August 2005 (aged 17)	(Canadian Soccer Association) NDC-CDN Ontario
4	DF	Zoe Markesini	7 October 2005 (aged 17)	(Canadian Soccer Association) NDC-CDN Ontario
5	DF	Clare Logan	24 August 2005 (aged 17)	(Canadian Soccer Association) Vancouver Whitecaps FC
6	MF	Thaea Mouratidis	30 March 2004 (aged 19)	(United States Soccer Federation) Providence College
7	FW	Amanda Allen	21 February 2005 (aged 18)	(United States Soccer Federation) Orlando Pride
8	MF	Ella McBride	16 April 2004 (aged 19)	(United States Soccer Federation) Providence College
9	FW	Annabelle Chukwu	8 February 2007 (aged 16)	(Canadian Soccer Association) NDC-CDN Ontario
10	FW	Olivia Smith	5 August 2004 (aged 18)	(United States Soccer Federation) Pennsylvania State University
11	FW	Rosa Maalouf	19 June 2006 (aged 16)	(Canadian Soccer Association) NDC-CDN Ontario
12	FW	Nyah Rose	4 April 2005 (aged 18)	(Canadian Soccer Association) NDC-CDN Ontario
13	MF	Florianne Jourde	5 November 2004 (aged 18)	(Canadian Soccer Association) NDC-CDN Québec
14	DF	Sophie Murdock	19 November 2005 (aged 17)	(United States Soccer Federation) Mountain View Los Altos SC
15	FW	Jaime Perrault	8 August 2006 (aged 16)	(Canadian Soccer Association) Vancouver Whitecaps FC
16	DF	Renee Watson	28 May 2005 (aged 17)	(Canadian Soccer Association) NDC-CDN Ontario
17	MF	Kayla Briggs	5 July 2005 (aged 17)	(Canadian Soccer Association) NDC-CDN Ontario
18	MF	Jeneva Hernandez Gray	5 October 2006 (aged 16)	(Canadian Soccer Association) Vancouver Whitecaps FC
19	DF	Jadea Collin	29 January 2006 (aged 17)	(Canadian Soccer Association) NDC-CDN Ontario
20	GK	Faith Fenwick	4 February 2005 (aged 18)	(Canadian Soccer Association) NDC-CDN Ontario
21	GK	Noelle Henning	4 February 2007 (aged 16)	(Canadian Soccer Association) NDC-CDN Ontario

=== Jamaica ===
Coach: Malia Atkins

The final squad was announced on 18 May 2023.

No.	Pos.	Player	Date of birth (age)	Club
1	GK	Liya Brooks	17 May 2005 (aged 18)	(United States Soccer Federation) Hawaii Surf
2	DF	Akelia Johnson	13 January 2006 (aged 17)	(Jamaica Football Federation) Frazier's Whip
3	MF	Andrene Smith	26 November 2006 (aged 16)	(Jamaica Football Federation) Frazier's Whip
4	FW	Anaiyah Robinson	11 May 2006 (aged 17)	(Jamaica Football Federation) Challenge SC
5	DF	Janiel Mignott	13 May 2005 (aged 18)	(Jamaica Football Federation) Frazier's Whip
6	MF	Kaitlyn Ennis	7 September 2006 (aged 16)	(Jamaica Football Federation) FC Prime
7	FW	Tiny Seaton	12 August 2006 (aged 16)	(Jamaica Football Federation) Frazier's Whip
8	DF	Avery Johnson	12 November 2006 (aged 16)	(United States Soccer Federation) Charlotte County
9	FW	Natoya Atkinson	16 March 2005 (aged 18)	(Jamaica Football Federation) Frazier's Whip
10	MF	Una Lue	17 January 2006 (aged 17)	Unattached
11	MF	Shaneil Buckley	20 May 2005 (aged 18)	(Jamaica Football Federation) Frazier's Whip
12	MF	Maya Raghunandanan	4 September 2007 (aged 15)	(United States Soccer Federation) Philadelphia Ukrainians
13	GK	Katie Oakley	23 January 2004 (aged 19)	(United States Soccer Federation) Georgia Southern University
14	MF	Destiny Powell	10 April 2007 (aged 16)	(Jamaica Football Federation) Frazier's Whip
15	FW	Davia Richards	10 February 2004 (aged 19)	(Jamaica Football Federation) Frazier's Whip
16	DF	Liha Williams	8 October 2004 (aged 18)	(Jamaica Football Federation) Cavalier
17	MF	Njeri Butts	2 April 2004 (aged 19)	(United States Soccer Federation) University of Florida
18	DF	Amelia Van Zanten	25 January 2005 (aged 18)	(United States Soccer Federation) Eclipse Select
19	FW	Taijah Fraser	5 January 2004 (aged 19)	(United States Soccer Federation) Middle Tennessee State University
20	DF	Njeri Lewis	8 March 2004 (aged 19)	(United States Soccer Federation) University of Kentucky

=== Panama ===
Coach: Raiza Gutiérrez

The final squad was announced on 22 May 2023.

No.	Pos.	Player	Date of birth (age)	Club
1	GK	Alejandra Garay	6 June 2004 (aged 18)	(Panamanian Football Federation) FC Chorrillo
2	DF	Amayah Singleton	3 June 2005 (aged 17)	(United States Soccer Federation) Wake FC
3	DF	Josselyn Montenegro	19 October 2004 (aged 18)	(Panamanian Football Federation) Deportivo Chiriquí
4	DF	Dayane Madrid	30 October 2006 (aged 16)	(Panamanian Football Federation) Sporting San Miguelito
5	DF	Meredith Rosas	15 January 2005 (aged 18)	(Panamanian Football Federation) Sporting San Miguelito
6	MF	Deysiré Salazar	4 May 2004 (aged 19)	(Panamanian Football Federation) Tauro FC
7	MF	Sherline King	3 March 2006 (aged 17)	(Panamanian Football Federation) Tauro FC
8	MF	Diana Pon	15 August 2004 (aged 18)	(United States Soccer Federation) Pennsylvania State University
9	FW	Daniela Hincapié	4 March 2005 (aged 18)	(Panamanian Football Federation) CA Independiente
10	MF	Reggina Espino	20 June 2006 (aged 16)	(Panamanian Football Federation) Sporting San Miguelito
11	MF	Aaliyah Gil	18 July 2004 (aged 18)	(Panamanian Football Federation) Tauro FC
12	GK	Maritza Valdés	2 June 2005 (aged 17)	(Panamanian Football Federation) Sporting San Miguelito
13	MF	Nicole Cargill	28 November 2004 (aged 18)	(United States Soccer Federation) Forest Park Bruins
14	MF	Delineth Rivera	8 May 2006 (aged 17)	(Panamanian Football Federation) Sporting San Miguelito
15	MF	Marissa Gross	8 July 2005 (aged 17)	(United States Soccer Federation) Dallas Texans
16	DF	Mireilis Rojas	16 July 2004 (aged 18)	(Panamanian Football Federation) FC Chorrillo
17	MF	Amanda Goldstein	4 June 2006 (aged 16)	(United States Soccer Federation) Fram SC
18	FW	Analía Arosemena	24 May 2008 (aged 15)	(Panamanian Football Federation) Tauro FC
19	MF	Aida Name	6 March 2005 (aged 18)	(United States Soccer Federation) FC Stars
20	MF	Nathalie Bello		(United States Soccer Federation) Hattiesburg FC
21	GK	Yurisel Ortega	15 January 2005 (aged 18)	(Panamanian Football Federation) SD Panamá Oeste

=== United States ===
Coach: (England) Tracey Kevins

The final squad was announced on 9 May 2023.

No.	Pos.	Player	Date of birth (age)	Club
1	GK	Teagan Wy	30 July 2004 (aged 18)	(United States Soccer Federation) California
12	GK	Valentina Amaral	5 April 2005 (aged 18)	(United States Soccer Federation) Florida Kraze Krush SC
21	GK	Mackenzie Gress	3 June 2004 (aged 18)	(United States Soccer Federation) Penn State
2	DF	Gisele Thompson	2 December 2005 (aged 17)	(United States Soccer Federation) Total Futbol Academy
3	DF	Savannah King	7 February 2005 (aged 18)	(United States Soccer Federation) HB Køge Slammers
4	DF	Ella Emri	15 December 2005 (aged 17)	(United States Soccer Federation) San Diego Surf SC
5	DF	Elise Evans	16 December 2004 (aged 18)	(United States Soccer Federation) Stanford
13	DF	Tessa Dellarose	2 April 2004 (aged 19)	(United States Soccer Federation) North Carolina
14	DF	Leah Klenke	21 June 2004 (aged 18)	(United States Soccer Federation) University of Notre Dame
6	MF	Ally Lemos	4 March 2004 (aged 19)	(United States Soccer Federation) UCLA
8	MF	Lauren Martinho	9 October 2005 (aged 17)	(United States Soccer Federation) North Carolina Courage Academy
10	MF	Shae Harvey	1 March 2005 (aged 18)	(United States Soccer Federation) HB Køge Slammers
16	MF	Jill Flammia	19 March 2004 (aged 19)	(United States Soccer Federation) Virginia
18	MF	Jasmine Aikey	7 July 2005 (aged 17)	(United States Soccer Federation) Stanford
20	MF	Sofia Cook	7 August 2004 (aged 18)	(United States Soccer Federation) UCLA
7	FW	Jordynn Dudley	21 November 2004 (aged 18)	(United States Soccer Federation) United Futbol Academy
9	FW	Ally Sentnor	18 February 2004 (aged 19)	(United States Soccer Federation) North Carolina
11	FW	Kat Rader	30 June 2004 (aged 18)	(United States Soccer Federation) Duke
15	FW	Maggie Cagle	4 May 2004 (aged 19)	(United States Soccer Federation) Virginia
17	FW	Onyeka Gamero	23 February 2006 (aged 17)	(United States Soccer Federation) Beach FC
19	FW	Madeline Dahlien	25 July 2004 (aged 18)	(United States Soccer Federation) North Carolina

== Group B ==
=== Costa Rica ===
Coach: Patricia Aguilar

The final squad was announced on 20 May 2023.

No.	Pos.	Player	Date of birth (age)	Club
1	GK	Génesis Pérez	4 May 2005 (aged 18)	(United States Soccer Federation) Montverde Academy
2	DF	Britany Vásquez	21 August 2006 (aged 16)	(Costa Rican Football Federation) Cofutpa
3	DF	Valentina Rivera	25 August 2006 (aged 16)	(Costa Rican Football Federation) Saprissa FF
4	MF	Luciana González	14 February 2005 (aged 18)	(Costa Rican Football Federation) Herediano
5	DF	Saray Benavides	24 December 2004 (aged 18)	(Costa Rican Football Federation) Alajuelense
6	MF	Sianif Agüero	27 January 2004 (aged 19)	(Costa Rican Football Federation) Alajuelense
7	MF	Verónica Matarrita	7 November 2005 (aged 17)	(Costa Rican Football Federation) Saprissa FF
8	MF	Mónica Matarrita	7 November 2005 (aged 17)	(Costa Rican Football Federation) Saprissa FF
9	FW	Tanisha Fonseca	5 November 2007 (aged 15)	(Costa Rican Football Federation) Sporting FC
10	MF	Sheika Scott	22 October 2006 (aged 16)	(Costa Rican Football Federation) Alajuelense
11	FW	Joselyn Fonseca	16 April 2005 (aged 18)	(Costa Rican Football Federation) Sporting FC
12	FW	Samira Roper	21 February 2004 (aged 19)	(United States Soccer Federation) Eastern Florida State
13	GK	Nancy Fonseca	5 March 2005 (aged 18)	(Costa Rican Football Federation) Municipal Pérez Zeledón
14	MF	Alexa Herrera	16 November 2004 (aged 18)	(Costa Rican Football Federation) Herediano
15	DF	Jocelyn Briceño	24 September 2006 (aged 16)	(Costa Rican Football Federation) Dimas Escazú
16	MF	Priscilla Rodríguez	26 May 2005 (aged 17)	(Costa Rican Football Federation) Saprissa FF
17	MF	Marian Solano	19 May 2006 (aged 17)	(Costa Rican Football Federation) Alajuelense
18	GK	Carolina Méndez	19 July 2004 (aged 18)	(Costa Rican Football Federation) Saprissa FF
19	DF	Jimena González	31 December 2005 (aged 17)	(Costa Rican Football Federation) Sporting FC
20	DF	Keishlyn Mena	12 October 2005 (aged 17)	(Costa Rican Football Federation) AD Chorotega
21	MF	Jimena Jiménez	27 July 2006 (aged 16)	(Costa Rican Football Federation) Saprissa FF

=== Dominican Republic ===
Coach: Betzaida Ubri

The final squad was announced on 18 May 2023.

No.	Pos.	Player	Date of birth (age)	Club
1	GK	Paloma Peña	20 February 2005 (aged 18)	(United States Soccer Federation) Tampa Bay United
2	DF	Janna Vázquez	16 May 2006 (aged 17)	(Dominican Football Federation) DV7 Academy
3	DF	Stella Tapia	15 February 2005 (aged 18)	(United States Soccer Federation) Player Development Academy
4	DF	Adriana Adames	28 September 2005 (aged 17)	(Dominican Football Federation) Colegio Babeque
5	DF	Paola Then	15 April 2004 (aged 19)	(United States Soccer Federation) Iowa Lakes CC
6	MF	Isabella Ventura	14 November 2006 (aged 16)	(United States Soccer Federation) Florida West FC
7	FW	Angelina Vargas	6 July 2005 (aged 17)	(United States Soccer Federation) Player Development Academy
8	DF	Renata Mercedes	22 October 2007 (aged 15)	(United States Soccer Federation) Taft School
9	FW	Ariana Díaz	6 April 2005 (aged 18)	(United States Soccer Federation) East Meadow SC
10	MF	Jaylen Vallecillo	23 April 2006 (aged 17)	(United States Soccer Federation) East Meadow SC
11	FW	Jazmin Jackson	24 November 2004 (aged 18)	(United States Soccer Federation) Virginia Development Academy
12	GK	Odaliana Gómez	19 June 2004 (aged 18)	(United States Soccer Federation) University of Delaware
13	MF	María Torreira	3 February 2006 (aged 17)	(Dominican Football Federation) Santo Domingo FC
14	MF	Alexa Castro	3 January 2007 (aged 16)	(United States Soccer Federation) FC Copa
15	MF	Yuleinis Brito	1 February 2008 (aged 15)	(Dominican Football Federation) Club 5 De Abril
16	DF	Faith Espiritusanto	29 January 2006 (aged 17)	(United States Soccer Federation) Florida United
17	MF	Jazmin Herrera	14 July 2005 (aged 17)	(United States Soccer Federation) Player Development Academy
18	DF	Nelianny Amador	2 July 2005 (aged 17)	(Dominican Football Federation) Club 5 De Abril
19	FW	Julia Jiménez	28 December 2007 (aged 15)	(Royal Spanish Football Federation) San Gabriel
20	GK	Nathalie Martínez	25 October 2006 (aged 16)	(Dominican Football Federation) Atlántico FC
21	MF	Jaimaris Díaz	20 August 2007 (aged 15)	(United States Soccer Federation) PBG Predators DA

=== Mexico ===
Coach: Ana Galindo

The final squad was announced on 21 May 2023. Andrea Frías withdrew injured and was replaced by Silvana González on 22 May.

No.	Pos.	Player	Date of birth (age)	Club
1	GK	Itzel Velasco	23 September 2004 (aged 18)	(Mexican Football Federation) América
2	DF	Michel Fong	2 June 2006 (aged 16)	(Mexican Football Federation) Tijuana
3	DF	Ana Mendoza	7 August 2005 (aged 17)	(Mexican Football Federation) Universidad Nacional
4	DF	Natalia Colin	17 May 2005 (aged 18)	(Mexican Football Federation) Toluca
5	DF	Giselle Espinoza	8 March 2005 (aged 18)	(United States Soccer Federation) Concorde Fire SC
6	FW	Alejandra Lomelí	30 June 2004 (aged 18)	(Mexican Football Federation) Atlas
7	MF	Maribel Flores	8 January 2005 (aged 18)	(United States Soccer Federation) Slammers FC
8	MF	Fátima Servín	17 May 2005 (aged 18)	(Mexican Football Federation) Monterrey
9	FW	Tatiana Flores	15 September 2005 (aged 17)	(Royal Spanish Football Federation) Real Oviedo
10	FW	Alice Soto	26 March 2006 (aged 17)	(Mexican Football Federation) Pachuca
11	MF	Valerie Vargas	25 May 2005 (aged 17)	(United States Soccer Federation) Beach FC
12	GK	Renatta Cota	12 May 2005 (aged 18)	(Mexican Football Federation) América
13	DF	Blanca Muñoz	9 July 2005 (aged 17)	(Mexican Football Federation) León
14	DF	Isabela Esquivias	14 February 2004 (aged 19)	(Mexican Football Federation) León
15	FW	Alexa Curiel	14 April 2004 (aged 19)	(Mexican Football Federation) Atlas
16	MF	Mailin Orozco	31 October 2004 (aged 18)	(Mexican Football Federation) Tijuana
17	MF	Montserrat Saldívar	20 September 2006 (aged 16)	(Mexican Football Federation) América
18	MF	Silvana González	24 October 2004 (aged 18)	(Mexican Football Federation) Atlético San Luis
19	MF	Paola García	29 March 2004 (aged 19)	(Mexican Football Federation) Atlas
20	MF	Hailey Gordon	21 January 2006 (aged 17)	(United States Soccer Federation) Slammers FC
21	GK	Carmen López	17 March 2005 (aged 18)	(United States Soccer Federation) DKSC

=== Puerto Rico ===
Coach: (United States) Nathaniel González

The final squad was announced on 16 May 2023.

No.	Pos.	Player	Date of birth (age)	Club
1	GK	Alondra Iriarte	11 April 2006 (aged 17)	(United States Soccer Federation) Cleveland Force
2	DF	Grace Burns	3 January 2006 (aged 17)	(United States Soccer Federation) World Class FC
3	FW	Eva Andersen	31 December 2005 (aged 17)	(United States Soccer Federation) Slammers FC
4	DF	Erin Smith	9 November 2005 (aged 17)	(United States Soccer Federation) Sunrise SC
5	FW	Sonia Neighbors	18 October 2004 (aged 18)	(United States Soccer Federation) University of Miami
6	DF	Iliana Pardo	25 July 2005 (aged 17)	(United States Soccer Federation) NC Courage Academy
7	DF	Jessica Torres	4 November 2004 (aged 18)	(United States Soccer Federation) Creighton University
8	DF	Estefanía González	9 November 2005 (aged 17)	(United States Soccer Federation) Montverde Academy
9	FW	Madison Krakower	7 March 2005 (aged 18)	(United States Soccer Federation) University of Maryland
10	FW	Kennedy García	16 February 2005 (aged 18)	(United States Soccer Federation) Players Development Academy
11	MF	Kiara Aguayo	13 April 2005 (aged 18)	(Puerto Rican Football Federation) Coamo FC
12	GK	Isabel Ackerman	24 February 2006 (aged 17)	(United States Soccer Federation) Tampa Bay United
13	FW	Abigail Koly	11 September 2004 (aged 18)	(United States Soccer Federation) University of Akron
14	DF	Gabriela Berríos	16 August 2006 (aged 16)	(United States Soccer Federation) Cedar Stars Academy
15	FW	Ashley McMahon	18 June 2006 (aged 16)	(United States Soccer Federation) World Class FC
16	MF	Sarah Martínez	3 April 2007 (aged 16)	(United States Soccer Federation) North Carolina Courage
17	MF	Enasia Colón	10 June 2007 (aged 15)	(United States Soccer Federation) Arizona State University
18	FW	Susana Roberts	10 June 2007 (aged 15)	(United States Soccer Federation) DBSS Siting
19	DF	Abigail Seawright	22 March 2006 (aged 17)	(United States Soccer Federation) LAFC So Cal
20	MF	Jocelyn Chinea	10 June 2007 (aged 15)	(United States Soccer Federation) University of Georgia
21	GK	Ariana Anderson	13 January 2005 (aged 18)	(United States Soccer Federation) Solar Soccer Club
