= 2022 CONCACAF Women's U-17 Championship =

Tournament details
- Host country: Dominican Republic
- Dates: 23 April – 8 May
- Teams: 20 (from 1 confederation)
- Venue: 2 (in 2 host cities)

Final positions
- Champions: United States (5th title)
- Runners-up: Mexico
- Third place: Canada
- Fourth place: Puerto Rico

Tournament statistics
- Matches played: 40
- Goals scored: 231 (5.78 per match)
- Top scorer: (Canada) Rosa Maalouf (12 goals)
- Best player: (United States) Riley Jackson
- Best goalkeeper: (United States) Victoria Safradin
- Fair play award: Mexico

The 2022 CONCACAF Women's U-17 Championship was the 7th edition of the CONCACAF Women's U-17 Championship, the biennial international youth football championship organised by CONCACAF for the women's under-17 national teams of the North, Central American and Caribbean region.

The top three teams of the tournament qualified for the 2022 FIFA U-17 Women's World Cup in India as the CONCACAF representatives.

== Qualification ==
The 41 CONCACAF teams were ranked based on the CONCACAF Women's Under-17 Ranking as of 1 July 2019, and 26 entered the competition for the 2022 CONCACAF Women's U-17 Championship final tournament. The highest-ranked 16 entrants advanced directly to the group stage of the final tournament, while the other 10 entrants participated in qualifying.

Round	Team	Qualification	Appearance	Previous best performance	Previous FIFA U-17 Women's World Cup appearances
Group stage	Mexico	1st ranked entrant	7th	Champions (2013)	5
Group stage	Canada	2nd ranked entrant	7th	Champions (2010)	6
Group stage	United States (title holders)	3rd ranked entrant	7th	Champions (2008, 2012, 2016, 2018)	4
Group stage	Haiti	4th ranked entrant	5th	Fourth place (2016, 2018)	0
Group stage	Costa Rica	5th ranked entrant	5th	Runners-up (2008)	2
Group stage	Jamaica	6th ranked entrant	6th	Fourth place (2013)	0
Group stage	Trinidad and Tobago	7th ranked entrant	4th	Group stage (2008, 2012, 2013)	1
Group stage	Guatemala	8th ranked entrant	4th	Group stage (2012, 2013, 2016)	0
Group stage	Puerto Rico	9th ranked entrant	3rd	Group stage (2008, 2018)	0
Group stage	Bermuda	10th ranked entrant	2nd	Group stage (2018)	0
Group stage	El Salvador	11th ranked entrant	3rd	Group stage (2008, 2013)	0
Group stage	Panama	12th ranked entrant	3rd	Fourth place (2012)	0
Group stage	Dominican Republic	13th ranked entrant	1st	Debut	0
Group stage	Cuba	14th ranked entrant	1st	Debut	0
Group stage	Grenada	15th ranked entrant	2nd	Group stage (2016)	0
Group stage	Nicaragua	16th ranked entrant	2nd	Group stage (2018)	0
Knockout stage	Saint Kitts and Nevis	Qualifying Group A winner	1st	Debut	0
Knockout stage	Curaçao	Qualifying Group B winner	1st	Debut	0
Knockout stage	Honduras	Qualifying Group C winner	1st	Debut	0
Knockout stage	Guyana	Qualifying Group C runner up	1st	Debut	0

== Venues ==
2022 CONCACAF Women's U-17 Championship is located in the Dominican Republic	Santo Domingo	San Cristóbal
2022 CONCACAF Women's U-17 Championship is located in the Dominican Republic	Estadio Olímpico Félix Sánchez	Estadio Panamericano
2022 CONCACAF Women's U-17 Championship is located in the Dominican Republic	Capacity: 27,000	Capacity: 2,800

== Draw ==
The draw of the tournament was held on 18 November 2021, 11:00 AST (UTC−4), at the CONCACAF Headquarters in Miami, Florida. The 16 teams which entered the group stage were drawn into four groups of four teams. Based on the CONCACAF Women's Under-17 Ranking, the 16 teams were distributed into four pots, with teams in Pot 1 assigned to each group prior to the draw, as follows:

Pot 1	Pot 2	Pot 3	Pot 4
Mexico (Group E); Canada (Group F); United States (Group G); Haiti (Group H)	Costa Rica; Jamaica; Trinidad and Tobago; Guatemala	Puerto Rico; Bermuda; El Salvador; Panama	Dominican Republic; Cuba; Grenada; Nicaragua

== Squads ==
Players born on or after 1 January 2005 are eligible to compete. Each team must register a squad of 20 players, two of whom must be goalkeepers.
2022 U17 W Squads-Official

== Group stage ==
The top three teams in each group advanced to the round of 16, where they were joined by the four teams advancing from the 2022 CONCACAF Women's U-17 Championship qualification.

Tiebreakers

The ranking of teams in each group is determined as follows (Regulations Article 12.8):

1. Points obtained in all group matches (three points for a win, one for a draw, zero for a loss).
2. Goal difference in all group matches.
3. Number of goals scored in all group matches.
4. Points obtained in the matches played between the teams in question.
5. Goal difference in the matches played between the teams in question.
6. Number of goals scored in the matches played between the teams in question.
7. Fair play points in all group matches (only one deduction can be applied to a player in a single match):
  - Yellow card: −1 point
  - Indirect red card (second yellow card): −3 points
  - Direct red card: −4 points
  - Yellow card and direct red card: −5 points
8. Drawing of lots.

All times are local, AST (UTC−4).

=== Group E ===
Pos	Team	Pld	W	D	L	GF	GA	GD	Pts	Qualification
1	Mexico	3	3	0	0	27	0	+27	9	Knockout stage
2	Panama	3	2	0	1	7	8	−1	6	Knockout stage
3	Nicaragua	3	1	0	2	4	12	−8	3	Knockout stage
4	Trinidad and Tobago	3	0	0	3	1	19	−18	0	

Source: CONCACAF
Rules for classification: Group stage tiebreakers
23 April 2022
16:00

Trinidad and Tobago	1–5	Panama
Smith 48'	Report	D. Rivera 21'; Hincapié 33', 41', 59'; Castrellón 90+2'

Estadio Olímpico Félix Sánchez, Santo Domingo
Referee: Myriam Marcotte (Canada)
23 April 2022
19:00

Mexico	10–0	Nicaragua
Vargas 11', 28', 31'; Meza 17', 70'; M. Flores 42', 57'; T. Flores 53'; Saldívar 89'; Sirdah 90'+2'	Report

Estadio Olímpico Félix Sánchez, Santo Domingo
Referee: Saphire Stockman (Costa Rica)

25 April 2022
16:00

Nicaragua	4–0	Trinidad and Tobago
Ad. Munguia 3'; Manzanares 24' (pen.); Sarantes 45+1'; Villalta 67'	Report

Estadio Olímpico Félix Sánchez, Santo Domingo
Referee: Merlin Soto (Honduras)
25 April 2022
19:00

Panama	0–7	Mexico
	Report	Sirdah 20'; Soto 23', 72'; M. Flores 31'; Vargas 66', 82'; Vega 89'

Estadio Olímpico Félix Sánchez, Santo Domingo
Referee: Suleimy Linares Sáez (Cuba)

27 April 2022
19:00

Panama	2–0	Nicaragua
Castrellón 35'; King 60'	Report

Estadio Panamericano, San Cristóbal
Referee: Neressa Goldson (Jamaica)
27 April 2022
19:00

Mexico	10–0	Trinidad and Tobago
Pineda 9'; Sirdah 26'; Jiménez 44'; Vega 63'; Hudlin 64' (o.g.); M. Flores 73', 75'; Ramírez 80', 84'; T. Flores 88'	Report

Estadio Olímpico Félix Sánchez, Santo Domingo
Referee: Alyssa Nichols (United States)

=== Group F ===
Pos	Team	Pld	W	D	L	GF	GA	GD	Pts	Qualification
1	Canada	3	2	1	0	16	1	+15	7	Knockout stage
2	Jamaica	3	2	1	0	11	2	+9	7	Knockout stage
3	Dominican Republic (H)	3	1	0	2	6	13	−7	3	Knockout stage
4	Bermuda	3	0	0	3	0	17	−17	0	

Source: CONCACAF
Rules for classification: Group stage tiebreakers
(H) Hosts
24 April 2022
16:00

Jamaica	7–0	Bermuda
Raghunandanan 8', 65'; Av. Johnson 12'; Seaton 16'; Nelson 47'; Buckley 78'; Atkinson 83'	Report

Estadio Olímpico Félix Sánchez, Santo Domingo
Referee: Mayary Cartagena (Guatemala)
24 April 2022
19:00

Canada	10–0	Dominican Republic
Adames 25' (o.g.); Maalouf 39' (pen.), 43', 46', 57'; Watson 67', 69'; Allen 85', 89'; Hauer 90+4'	Report

Estadio Olímpico Félix Sánchez, Santo Domingo
Referee: Cecile Hinds (Trinidad and Tobago)

26 April 2022
16:00

Bermuda	0–5	Canada
	Report	Logan 15'; Bordeleau 39'; Hauer 43'; Maalouf 70', 86'

Estadio Olímpico Félix Sánchez, Santo Domingo
Referee: Mayary Cartagena (Guatemala)
26 April 2022
19:00

Dominican Republic	1–3	Jamaica
Torreira 3'	Report	Seaton 30'; Wilson 70'; Atkinson 90+1'

Estadio Olímpico Félix Sánchez, Santo Domingo
Referee: Sandra Benítez (El Salvador)

28 April 2022
19:00

Canada	1–1	Jamaica
Watson 50'	Report	Atkinson 38'

Estadio Panamericano, San Cristóbal
Referee: Saphire Stockman (Costa Rica)
28 April 2022
19:00

Bermuda	0–5	Dominican Republic
	Report	Jiménez 3', 52'; Mercedes 10', 87'; A. Díaz 61'

Estadio Olímpico Félix Sánchez, Santo Domingo
Referee: Smeedly Saint-Jean (Haiti)

=== Group G ===
Pos	Team	Pld	W	D	L	GF	GA	GD	Pts	Qualification
1	United States	3	3	0	0	38	0	+38	9	Knockout stage
2	Costa Rica	3	2	0	1	13	7	+6	6	Knockout stage
3	Puerto Rico	3	1	0	2	5	17	−12	3	Knockout stage
4	Grenada	3	0	0	3	1	33	−32	0	

Source: CONCACAF
Rules for classification: Group stage tiebreakers
23 April 2022
16:00

United States	20–0	Grenada
Rebimbas 9', 36', 55'; Harvey 12', 26', 30', 59'; Oliaro 16', 61'; Kohler 21', 48', 50', 90+3'; Kiorpes 34'; Williams 43' (o.g.); Roller 64'; Hutton 72', 90+1'; Martinho 76'; Villarreal 81'	Report

Estadio Panamericano, San Cristóbal
Referee: Smeedly Saint-Jean (Haiti)
23 April 2022
19:00

Costa Rica	4–1	Puerto Rico
Scott 25'; L. González 29'; Briceño 58'; Rivera 80' (pen.)	Report	Martinez 35'

Estadio Panamericano, San Cristóbal
Referee: Neressa Goldson (Jamaica)

25 April 2022
16:00

Puerto Rico	0–13	United States
	Report	Martinho 6'; Villarreal 11', 39', 57', 60', 61'; Suarez 21', 67'; Hutton 34', 51', 65'; Kiorpes 69'; Fraser 84'

Estadio Panamericano, San Cristóbal
Referee: Karen Hernández (Mexico)
25 April 2022
19:00

Grenada	1–9	Costa Rica
Fullerton 21'	Report	Solano 24', 37'; Lobo 27'; Jiménez 49'; T. Fonseca 58', 61'; A. González 74' (pen.); Ramírez 78', 90+2'

Estadio Panamericano, San Cristóbal
Referee: Miranda Cibeles (El Salvador)

27 April 2022
16:00

Puerto Rico	4–0	Grenada
McIntosh 9' (o.g.); Krakower 75' (pen.), 81'; Rivera 90+2'	Report

Estadio Panamericano, San Cristóbal
Referee: Itzel Hernández (Mexico)
27 April 2022
16:00

United States	5–0	Costa Rica
Villarreal 4'; Kohler 45+1'; Jackson 58' (pen.); Gamero 61'; Hutton 90'	Report

Estadio Olímpico Félix Sánchez, Santo Domingo
Referee: Myriam Marcotte (Canada)

=== Group H ===
Pos	Team	Pld	W	D	L	GF	GA	GD	Pts	Qualification
1	El Salvador	3	3	0	0	11	0	+11	9	Knockout stage
2	Haiti	3	2	0	1	5	3	+2	6	Knockout stage
3	Cuba	3	1	0	2	2	5	−3	3	Knockout stage
4	Guatemala	3	0	0	3	1	11	−10	0	

Source: CONCACAF
Rules for classification: Group stage tiebreakers
24 April 2022
16:00

Guatemala	0–6	El Salvador
	Report	Ramirez 7'; Medina 38', 58'; Ayala 39'; Velásquez 85', 89'

Estadio Panamericano, San Cristóbal
Referee: Danielle Chesky (United States)
24 April 2022
19:00

Haiti	2–0	Cuba
Caramus 34'; Cyriaque 43'	Report

Estadio Panamericano, San Cristóbal
Referee: Lizzet García (Mexico)

26 April 2022
16:00

Cuba	2–0	Guatemala
Montalvo 45+1'; Ledesma 47' (pen.)	Report

Estadio Panamericano, San Cristóbal
Referee: Karitza Guerra (Honduras)
26 April 2022
19:00

El Salvador	2–0	Haiti
Berger 27'; Arevalo 59'	Report

Estadio Panamericano, San Cristóbal
Referee: Annays Rosario (Puerto Rico)

28 April 2022
16:00

El Salvador	3–0	Cuba
Sánchez 41'; Ayala 53'; Arevalo 58'	Report

Estadio Panamericano, San Cristóbal
Referee: Cecile Hinds (Trinidad and Tobago)
28 April 2022
16:00

Haiti	3–1	Guatemala
Houanche 3'; Joseph 70'; Cyriaque 82'	Report	Perla 90+5'

Estadio Olímpico Félix Sánchez, Santo Domingo
Referee: Karen Hernández (Mexico)

== Knockout stage ==
In the knockout stage, if a match is level at the end of 90 minutes, extra time is played, and if still tied after extra time, the match is decided by a penalty shoot-out (Regulations Article 12.13).

=== Qualified teams ===
Group	Winners	Runners-up (Best from qualification)	Third place
A (Q)	Saint Kitts and Nevis	–	–
B (Q)	Curaçao	–	–
C (Q)	Honduras	Guyana	–
E	Mexico	Panama	Nicaragua
F	Canada	Jamaica	Dominican Republic
G	United States	Costa Rica	Puerto Rico
H	El Salvador	Haiti	Cuba

=== Bracket ===
Round of 16
30 April – Santo Domingo
Mexico	15
Guyana	0
1 May – San Cristóbal
Haiti	0
Dominican Republic	2
30 April – Santo Domingo
Panama	0
Puerto Rico	2
1 May – San Cristóbal
El Salvador	10
Saint Kitts and Nevis	0
30 April – San Cristóbal
United States	11
Curaçao	0
1 May – Santo Domingo
Jamaica	4
Cuba	0
30 April – San Cristóbal
Costa Rica	1
Nicaragua	0
1 May – Santo Domingo
Canada	4
Honduras	1

Quarter-finals
4 May – Santo Domingo
Mexico	10
Dominican Republic	0
4 May – San Cristóbal
Puerto Rico	2
El Salvador	0
4 May – Santo Domingo
United States	4
Jamaica	0
4 May – San Cristóbal
Costa Rica	0
Canada	3

Semi-finals
6 May – Santo Domingo
Mexico	5
Puerto Rico	0
6 May – Santo Domingo
United States	3
Canada	0

Final
8 May – Santo Domingo
Mexico	1
United States	2
Third place playoff
8 May – Santo Domingo
Puerto Rico	0
Canada	3

=== Round of 16 ===
30 April 2022
16:00

Mexico	15–0	Guyana
Vargas 2', 49', 54'; Fong 5'; Sirdah 27', 33', 44'; Martinez 34'; T. Flores 47', 56', 60'; Guijarro 59'; Blake 74' (o.g.); M. Flores 82'; Ramírez 90'	Report

Estadio Olímpico Félix Sánchez, Santo Domingo
Referee: Annays Rosario (Puerto Rico)

30 April 2022
16:00

United States	11–0	Curaçao
Gamero 1', 41', 73'; Kiorpes 7', 55' (pen.), 84'; Rebimbas 11'; Martinho 29'; Bhuta 39', 67'; Oliaro 58'	Report

Estadio Panamericano, San Cristóbal
Referee: Suleimy Linares Sáez (Cuba)

30 April 2022
19:00

Panama	0–2	Puerto Rico
	Report	Krakower 60' (pen.); Baez 86'

Estadio Olímpico Félix Sánchez, Santo Domingo
Referee: Lizzet García (Mexico)

30 April 2022
19:00

Costa Rica	1–0	Nicaragua
T. Fonseca 45+3'	Report

Estadio Panamericano, San Cristóbal
Referee: Danielle Chesky (United States)

1 May 2022
16:00

Canada	4–1	Honduras
Maalouf 34' (pen.), 49', 82'; Allen 88'	Report	Henríquez 28'

Estadio Olímpico Félix Sánchez, Santo Domingo
Referee: Alyssa Nichols (United States)

1 May 2022
16:00

El Salvador	10–0	Saint Kitts and Nevis
Ayala 1', 4'; Arevalo 42'; Ramirez 44'; Sánchez 45+1'; Sotelo 50'; Villa 77', 82'; Velásquez 83', 87'	Report

Estadio Panamericano, San Cristóbal
Referee: Itzel Hernández (Mexico)

1 May 2022
19:00

Jamaica	4–0	Cuba
Atkinson 2', 59'; Buckley 53'; Wilson 73'	Report

Estadio Olímpico Félix Sánchez, Santo Domingo
Referee: Miranda Cibeles (El Salvador)

1 May 2022
19:00

Haiti	0–2	Dominican Republic
	Report	Torreira 39'; Jiménez 42'

Estadio Panamericano, San Cristóbal
Referee: Merlin Soto (Honduras)

=== Quarter-finals ===
4 May 2022
16:00

Mexico	10–0	Dominican Republic
T. Flores 16', 33', 41'; Soto 19', 22', 38'; M. Flores 37'; Colin 49' (pen.); Ramírez 70'; Sirdah 80'	Report

Estadio Olímpico Félix Sánchez, Santo Domingo
Referee: Saphire Stockman (Costa Rica)

4 May 2022
16:00

United States	4–0	Jamaica
Villarreal 3'; Kohler 32'; Jackson 42'; Rebimbas 56'	Report

Estadio Panamericano, San Cristóbal
Referee: Smeedly Saint-Jean (Haiti)

4 May 2022
19:00

Puerto Rico	2–0	El Salvador
Nieves-Melchor 37'; Sims 64'	Report

Estadio Olímpico Félix Sánchez, Santo Domingo
Referee: Mayary Cartagena (Guatemala)

4 May 2022
19:00

Costa Rica	0–3	Canada
	Report	Maalouf 53', 70'; Watson 66'

Estadio Panamericano, San Cristóbal
Referee: Karitza Guerra (Honduras)

=== Semi-finals ===
Winners qualify for the 2022 FIFA U-17 Women's World Cup.

6 May 2022
16:00

Mexico	5–0	Puerto Rico
Vargas 5', 29'; Soto 8'; Sirdah 24'; T. Flores 84'	Report

Estadio Olímpico Félix Sánchez, Santo Domingo
Referee: Myriam Marcotte (Canada)

6 May 2022
19:00

United States	3–0	Canada
Rebimbas 18', 58'; Gamero 78'	Report

Estadio Olímpico Félix Sánchez, Santo Domingo
Referee: Sandra Benítez (El Salvador)

=== Third place ===
Winner qualifies for 2022 FIFA U-17 Women's World Cup.

8 May 2022
14:00

Puerto Rico	0–3	Canada
	Report	Hauer 51'; Allen 53'; Maalouf 86'

Estadio Olímpico Félix Sánchez, Santo Domingo
Referee: Amairany García (Mexico)

=== Final ===
8 May 2022
17:00

Mexico	1–2	United States
M. Flores 66'	Report	Martinho 20'; Rebimbas 77'

Estadio Olímpico Félix Sánchez, Santo Domingo
Referee: Annays Rosario (Puerto Rico)

== Winners ==
2022 CONCACAF Women's U-17 Championship

United States
5th title

== Goalscorers ==
There were 231 goals scored in 40 matches, for an average of 5.78 goals per match.

12 goals

- (Canada) Rosa Maalouf

10 goals

- (Mexico) Valerie Vargas

9 goals

- (Mexico) Tatiana Flores

8 goals

- (Mexico) Maribel Flores
- (Mexico) Layla Sirdah
- (United States) Melina Rebimbas
- (United States) Amalia Villarreal

6 goals

- (Mexico) Alice Soto
- (United States) Claire Hutton
- (United States) Charlotte Kohler

5 goals

- (Jamaica) Natoya Atkinson
- (United States) Onyeka Gamero
- (United States) Nicollette Kiorpes

4 goals

- (Canada) Amanda Allen
- (Canada) Renee Watson
- (El Salvador) Carolina Ayala
- (El Salvador) Karoline Velásquez
- (Mexico) Deiry Ramírez
- (United States) Shae Harvey
- (United States) Lauren Martinho

3 goals

- (Canada) Anna Hauer
- (Costa Rica) Tanisha Fonseca
- (Dominican Republic) Julia Jiménez
- (El Salvador) Mía Arevalo
- (Panama) Daniela Hincapié
- (Puerto Rico) Madison Krakower
- (United States) Mia Oliaro

2 goals

- (Costa Rica) Sara Ramírez
- (Costa Rica) Marian Solano
- (Dominican Republic) Renata Mercedes
- (Dominican Republic) María Torreira
- (El Salvador) Breanna Medina
- (El Salvador) Cynthia Ramirez
- (El Salvador) Victoria Sánchez
- (El Salvador) Sarina Villa
- (Haiti) Walandjina Cyriaque
- (Jamaica) Shaneil Buckley
- (Jamaica) Maya Raghunandanan
- (Jamaica) Tiny Seaton
- (Jamaica) Dannique Wilson
- (Mexico) Daniela Meza
- (Mexico) Brenda Vega
- (Panama) Ninelys Castrellón
- (United States) Mia Bhuta
- (United States) Riley Jackson
- (United States) Taylor Suarez

1 goal

- (Canada) Jade Bordeleau
- (Canada) Clare Logan
- (Costa Rica) Josselyn Briceño
- (Costa Rica) Luciana González
- (Costa Rica) Jimena Jiménez
- (Costa Rica) Sharon Lobo
- (Costa Rica) Valentina Rivera
- (Costa Rica) Sheika Scott
- (Costa Rica) Ashly González
- (Cuba) Dalia Ledesma
- (Cuba) Ainachy Montalvo
- (Dominican Republic) Ariana Díaz
- (El Salvador) Anika Berger
- (El Salvador) Yaneth Sotelo
- (Grenada) Melania Fullerton
- (Guatemala) Flor Perla
- (Haiti) Chritlove Caramus
- (Haiti) Ancie-Love Houanche
- (Haiti) Ronise Joseph
- (Honduras) Susan Henríquez
- (Jamaica) Avery Johnson
- (Jamaica) Tyesha Nelson
- (Mexico) Natalia Colin
- (Mexico) Michel Fong
- (Mexico) Katherin Guijarro
- (Mexico) Sofía Jiménez
- (Mexico) Jade Martinez
- (Mexico) Grecia Pineda
- (Mexico) Montserrat Saldívar
- (Nicaragua) Daniela Manzanares
- (Nicaragua) Adriana Munguia
- (Nicaragua) Jenifer Sarantes
- (Nicaragua) Stella Villalta
- (Panama) Sherline King
- (Panama) Delineth Rivera
- (Puerto Rico) Rachel Baez
- (Puerto Rico) Fabiola Martinez
- (Puerto Rico) Marilia Nieves-Melchor
- (Puerto Rico) Aleah Rivera
- (Puerto Rico) Indigo Sims
- (Trinidad and Tobago) Breana Smith
- (United States) Nicola Fraser
- (United States) Cameron Roller

1 own goal

- (Dominican Republic) Adriana Adames (against Canada)
- (Grenada) Tiara McIntosh (against Puerto Rico)
- (Grenada) Abigail Williams (against the United States)
- (Guyana) Alyssa Blake (against Mexico)
- (Trinidad and Tobago) Allyah Hudlin (against Mexico)

Source: CONCACAF

== Qualified teams for FIFA U-17 Women's World Cup ==
Team	Qualified on	Previous appearances in FIFA U-17 Women's World Cup^{1}
Mexico	6 May 2022	5 (2010, 2012, 2014, 2016, 2018)
United States	6 May 2022	4 (2008, 2012, 2016, 2018)
Canada	8 May 2022	6 (2008, 2010, 2012, 2014, 2016, 2018)

^{1} Bold indicates champions for that year. Italic indicates hosts for that year.

== Awards ==
Golden Ball	Golden Boot	Golden Glove
(United States) Riley Jackson	(Canada) Rosa Maalouf	(United States) Victoria Safradin
CONCACAF Fair Play Award
Mexico
