= Melina Rebimbas =

American soccer player (born 2005)

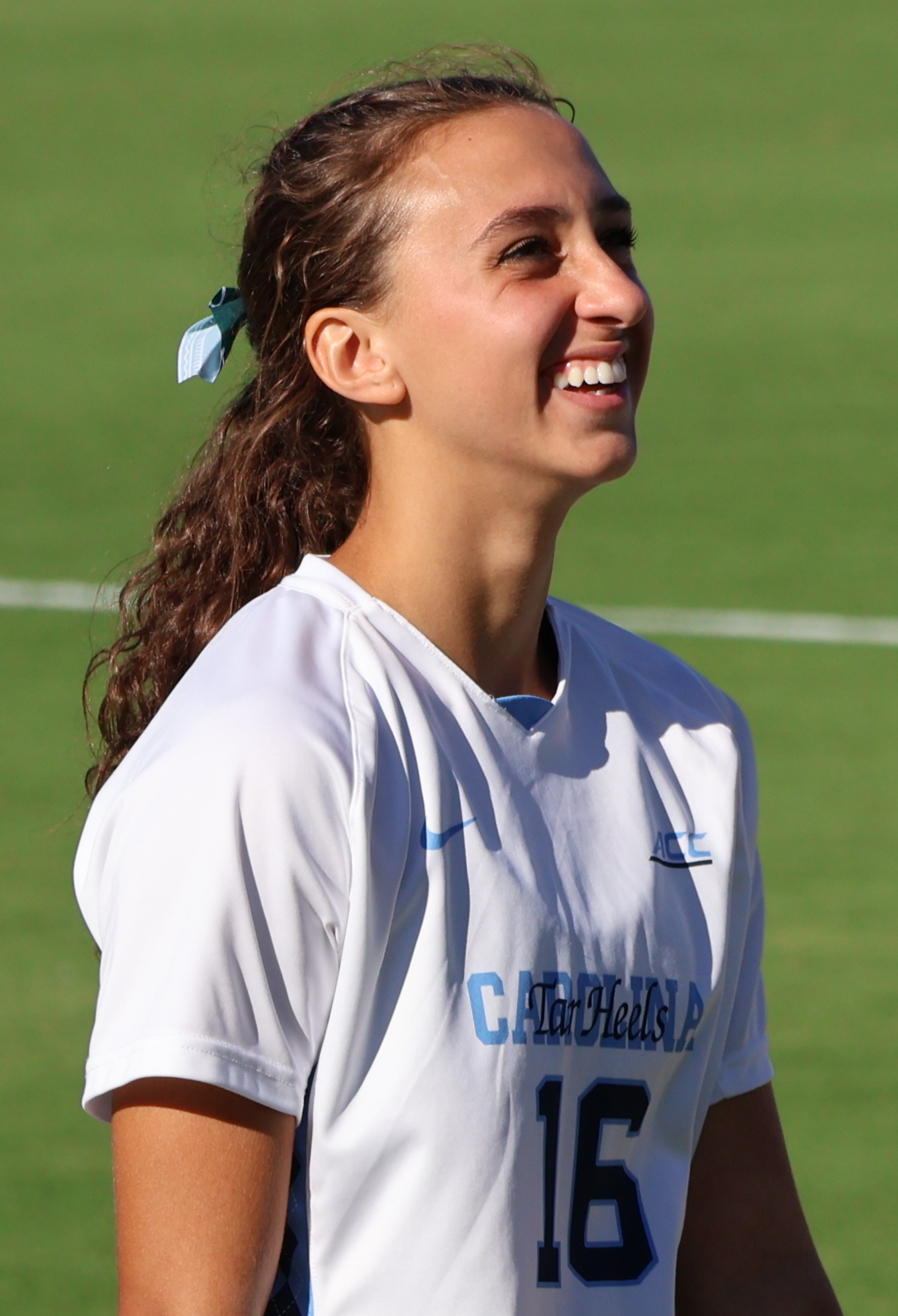
- Rebimbas with North Carolina in 2023

Personal information
- Full name: Melina Angelica Rebimbas
- Date of birth: May 4, 2005 (age 21)
- Place of birth: Summit, New Jersey, United States
- Height: 5 ft 7 in (1.70 m)
- Positions: Midfielder; defender

Team information
- Current team: Alabama Crimson Tide
- Number: 13

Youth career
- PDA

College career
Years	Team	Apps	(Gls)
2023	North Carolina Tar Heels	23	(3)
2024–	Alabama Crimson Tide	55	(7)

Senior career*
Years	Team	Apps	(Gls)
2023	Morris Elite (USL W)	6	(10)

International career
2022	United States U-17	18	(10)
- * Club domestic league appearances and goals

Melina Angelica Rebimbas (born May 4, 2005) is an American college soccer player who plays as a midfielder or defender for the Alabama Crimson Tide. She previously played for the North Carolina Tar Heels. She is a youth international for the United States, winning the 2022 CONCACAF Women's U-17 Championship and appearing at the 2022 FIFA U-17 Women's World Cup.

== Early life ==
Rebimbas was born in Summit, New Jersey, and grew up in Warren. Her father, a college basketball coach, put her into soccer and basketball when she was three or four, and she chose to focus on soccer by her mid-teens. After playing for local club Watchung Hills, she joined the Players Development Academy, where she earned Elite Clubs National League conference player of the year and All-American honors twice.

In her freshman year at Rutgers Preparatory School in 2019, Rebimbas scored 27 goals and helped lead the team to its first Non-Public B state title. After a sophomore season shortened by the COVID-19 pandemic, she scored 40 goals as a junior in 2021, making another state title game appearance. In her senior year, although she missed a month at the 2022 FIFA U-17 Women's World Cup, she scored 24 goals and powered the team to its second state title. She was named the New Jersey Gatorade Player of the Year twice and the NJ.com Player of the Year in 2022.

Rebimbas was ranked by TopDrawerSoccer as the No. 3 prospect of the 2023 class, the highest-ranked member of North Carolina's top-ranked recruiting class. Her other finalist school was Rutgers.

== College career ==
Rebimbas appeared in all 23 games for the North Carolina Tar Heels in her freshman season in 2023, making one start, and scored 3 goals with 3 assists. She entered the NCAA transfer portal after season, one of many departures from the program.

After transferring to the Alabama Crimson Tide, she suffered a hip injury in her first practice and went through surgery and recovery in the spring and summer of 2024. In her first season in Alabama, she played in 16 games and scored 2 goals.

== International career ==
Rebimbas began training with the United States youth national team at the under-14 level in 2018 and progressed to the under-15 team in 2019 and the under-17 team in 2020. She was the United States's joint top scorer at the 2022 CONCACAF Women's U-17 Championship with eight goals, including at least one in each of the knockout rounds, with two in the 3–0 semifinal win against Canada and the game winner in the 2–1 final win against Mexico. She then played at the 2022 FIFA U-17 Women's World Cup in India, scoring twice against the hosts in the tournament opener. She later trained with the under-18/under-19 team in 2023 and the under-20 team in 2025.

== Personal life ==
Rebimbas is the daughter of Jose and Lisa Rebimbas and has an older brother. Her father, who played college basketball player at Seton Hall University, is an assistant coach for the Seton Hall women's basketball team.

== Honors and awards ==
United States U-17

- CONCACAF Women's U-17 Championship: 2022

Individual

- First-team All-SEC: 2026
- Third-team All-SEC: 2025
