= Thomas Bordeleau =

American ice hockey player (born 2002)

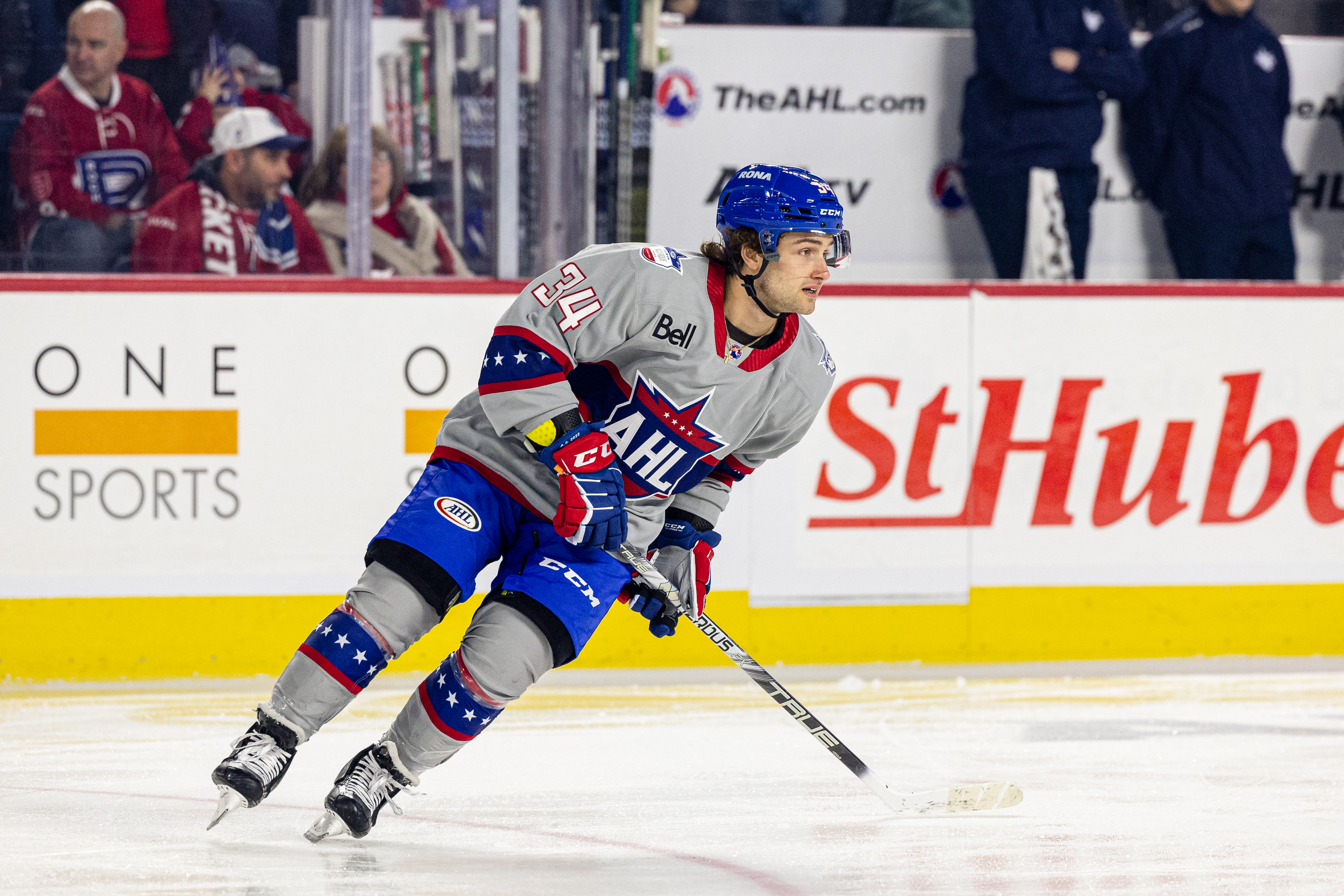
- Bordeleau at the 2023 AHL All-Star Game.
- Born: January 3, 2002 (age 24) Houston, Texas, U.S.
- Height: 5 ft 10 in (178 cm)
- Weight: 180 lb (82 kg; 12 st 12 lb)
- Position: Forward
- Shoots: Left
- AHL team Former teams: Rochester Americans; San Jose Sharks
- National team: United States
- NHL draft: 38th overall, 2020; San Jose Sharks
- Playing career: 2022–present

Thomas Bordeleau (born January 3, 2002) is an American professional ice hockey player who is a forward who is currently playing for the Rochester Americans of the American Hockey League (AHL). He was drafted 38th overall by the San Jose Sharks in the 2020 NHL entry draft. His father is former NHL player Sébastien Bordeleau.

== Early life ==
Bordeleau was born in Houston, to Sébastien Bordeleau and gynecologist Chantal Dubois, while his father played for the Houston Aeros. He then lived in Switzerland for 10 years before moving to Terrebonne, Quebec, after his father retired in 2012.

== Playing career ==
=== Junior ===
During the 2018–19 season, Bordeleau led the team in scoring, recording 16 goals and 23 assists in 56 games for the USA Hockey National Team Development Program of the United States Hockey League (USHL).

=== Collegiate ===
Bordeleau began his collegiate career for the Michigan Wolverines during the 2020–21 season. During his freshman season he led the nation in freshman scoring, and led the team in scoring with eight goals and 22 assists in 24 games. He recorded three game-winning goals and was a +18, the sixth-best on-ice rating in the Big Ten Conference. He led the league in faceoff win percentage (.580), winning 211 draws. Following an outstanding season, he was named to the Big Ten All-Freshman Team, the All-Big Ten Second Team and was named Big Ten Freshman of the Year. He was also awarded the Tim Taylor Award.

During the 2021–22 season, in his sophomore year, he finished tied for fourth in points (37), fifth in goals (12) and third in assists (25).

=== Professional ===
On April 12, 2022, Bordeleau signed an amateur tryout contract with the San Jose Barracuda, the American Hockey League (AHL) affiliate of the San Jose Sharks, for the remainder of the 2021–22 season. He made his professional debut for the Barracuda the next day and recorded three assists in his first career AHL game. On April 16, Bordeleau signed a three-year, entry-level contract with the San Jose Sharks. The next day, he made his NHL debut in a 5–4 overtime loss to the Minnesota Wild, while also getting his first point by assisting a goal. He scored his first career NHL goal on October 14, 2023, in a 2–1 shootout loss to the Colorado Avalanche. He re-signed with the Sharks on July 26, 2024.

On July 2, 2025, Bordeleau was traded from San Jose to the New Jersey Devils in exchange for Shane Bowers. As a restricted free agent he was re-signed by the Devils to a one-year, two-way contract extension for the 2025–26 season on July 25, 2025.

On February 4, 2026, Bordeleau was traded to the St. Louis Blues, alongside a conditional 2026 fourth-round pick, in exchange for Nick Bjugstad. Prior to being traded, he recorded two goals and six assists in 35 games for the Utica Comets during the 2025–26 season.

As a free agent at the conclusion of his contract with the Blues, Bordeleau remained un-signed over the summer until securing a one-year AHL contract with the Rochester Americans, affiliate to the Buffalo Sabres, on September 16, 2026.

== International play ==
Bordeleau was scheduled to represent the United States junior team at the 2021 World Junior Championships, however, he was cut from the roster due to COVID-19 protocols.

On May 5, 2022, Bordeleau was named to the United States senior team to compete at the 2022 World Championship. He recorded two goals in eight games.

== Personal life ==
Bordeleau is the son of former professional ice hockey player Sébastien Bordeleau, and the grandson of Paulin Bordeleau. He is the brother of soccer player Jade Bordeleau. He holds American, Canadian, and French citizenship, and his first language is French.

== Career statistics ==
=== Regular season and playoffs ===
			Regular season					Playoffs
Season	Team	League	GP	G	A	Pts	PIM	GP	G	A	Pts	PIM
2018–19	U.S. National Development Team	USHL	56	16	23	39	46	—	—	—	—	—
2019–20	U.S. National Development Team	USHL	47	16	30	46	16	—	—	—	—	—
2020–21	University of Michigan	B1G	24	8	22	30	12	—	—	—	—	—
2021–22	University of Michigan	B1G	37	12	25	37	35	—	—	—	—	—
2021–22	San Jose Barracuda	AHL	2	0	3	3	0	—	—	—	—	—
2021–22	San Jose Sharks	NHL	8	0	5	5	0	—	—	—	—	—
2022–23	San Jose Barracuda	AHL	65	22	19	41	24	—	—	—	—	—
2022–23	San Jose Sharks	NHL	8	0	2	2	0	—	—	—	—	—
2023–24	San Jose Sharks	NHL	27	6	5	11	18	—	—	—	—	—
2023–24	San Jose Barracuda	AHL	35	11	14	25	26	—	—	—	—	—
2024–25	San Jose Barracuda	AHL	59	14	24	38	39	—	—	—	—	—
2024–25	San Jose Sharks	NHL	1	0	0	0	0	—	—	—	—	—
2025–26	Utica Comets	AHL	35	2	6	8	37	—	—	—	—	—
2025–26	Springfield Thunderbirds	AHL	25	7	6	13	16	9	1	4	5	6
NHL totals			44	6	12	18	18	—	—	—	—	—

=== International ===
Year	Team	Event	Result	GP	G	A	Pts	PIM
2018	United States	WHC17	8th	5	0	4	4	2
2022	United States	WC	4th	8	2	0	2	2
2022	United States	WJC	5th	5	1	7	8	2
Junior totals				10	1	11	12	4
Senior totals				8	2	0	2	2

== Awards and honors ==
Award	Year	Ref
College
Big Ten Freshman of the Year	2021	
All-Big Ten Freshman Team	2021	
All-Big Ten Second Team	2021	
Tim Taylor Award	2021	

Awards and achievements
Preceded by Cole Caufield	Big Ten Freshman of the Year; 2020–21	Succeeded by Jakub Dobeš / Luke Hughes
Preceded by Alex Newhook	Tim Taylor Award; 2020–21	Succeeded by Devon Levi
