= 2022 CONCACAF Women's U-17 Championship qualification =

2022 CONCACAF Women's U-17 Championship qualifying
Tournament details
- Host country: United States
- City: Bradenton
- Dates: 20 October – 1 November 2021
- Teams: 10
- Venue(s): 2 (in 1 host city)

Tournament statistics
- Matches played: 12
- Goals scored: 52 (4.33 per match)
- Top scorer(s): (Honduras) Anyeli Rodríguez (5 goals)

2022 CONCACAF Women's U-17 Championship qualifying was the qualifying tournament for the 2022 CONCACAF Women's U-17 Championship. Ten teams competed for four spots in the knockout round of the final tournament, where they will join the 16 highest-seeded teams in the competition.

== Teams ==
The 41 CONCACAF teams were ranked based on the CONCACAF Women's Under-17 Ranking as of 1 July 2019. A total of 26 teams entered the tournament after six withdrew due to COVID-19 pandemic restrictions. The highest-ranked 16 entrants were exempt from qualifying and advanced directly to the group stage of the final tournament, while the lowest-ranked 10 entrants entered in the qualifying tournament, where the winners of the three groups and the best runner-up advanced to the round of 16 of the knockout stage of the final tournament.

Exempt from qualifying (16 teams)
Rank	Team	Points
1	Mexico	6,463
2	Canada	6,187
3	United States	5,463
4	Haiti	2,817
5	Costa Rica	2,542
6	Jamaica	2,187
7	Trinidad and Tobago	1,766
8	Guatemala	1,590
9	Puerto Rico	1,160
10	Bermuda	1,043
11	El Salvador	1,006
12	Panama	961
13	Dominican Republic	633
14	Cuba	562
15	Grenada	555
16	Nicaragua	483

Participating in qualifying (10 teams)
Rank	Team	Points
18	Honduras	383
19	Barbados	323
21	Saint Kitts and Nevis	313
23	Curaçao	196
26	U.S. Virgin Islands	146
27	Anguilla	139
28	Guyana	129
29	Belize	95
30	Suriname	87
41	Turks and Caicos Islands	0

Did not enter tournament (15 teams)
Rank	Team	Points
17	Bahamas	404
20	Antigua and Barbuda	322
22	Saint Lucia	216
24	Dominica	171
25	Cayman Islands	155
31	Aruba	67
32	Saint Vincent and the Grenadines	41
33	British Virgin Islands	35
34	Bonaire (Note: Non-FIFA members and thus ineligible to play in World Cup.)	0
35	French Guiana	0
36	Guadeloupe	0
37	Martinique	0
38	Montserrat	0
39	Sint Maarten	0
40	Saint Martin	0

== Draw ==
The draw for the group stage took place on 11 June 2021, 11:00 EDT (UTC−4), at the CONCACAF Headquarters in Miami. The 16 teams which initially entered qualifying were drawn into four groups of four teams. After six teams withdrew due to COVID-19 restrictions after the draw, the format was changed into two groups of three and one group of four. Based on the CONCACAF Women's Under-17 Ranking, the initial 16 teams were distributed into four pots, as follows:

Pot 1	Pot 2	Pot 3	Pot 4
Honduras; Barbados; ~~Antigua and Barbuda~~ (W); Saint Kitts and Nevis	~~Saint Lucia~~ (W); Curaçao; ~~Dominica~~ (W); ~~Cayman Islands~~ (W)	U.S. Virgin Islands; Anguilla; Guyana; Belize	Suriname; ~~Saint Vincent and the Grenadines~~ (W); ~~Guadeloupe~~ (W); Turks and Caicos Islands

- (W): Withdrew after draw
- Group D was not played due to the withdrawal of 3 of the 4 teams from the group before starting qualifications. Guyana, originally in Group D, took a place in Group C.

== Qualifying stage ==
The winners of each group and the best-placed runner-up qualify for the final tournament, where they enter the round of 16 of the knockout stage. All matches were played at IMG Academy, Bradenton in the United States. All times are local, EST (UTC−5).

Tiebreakers

The ranking of teams in each group is determined as follows (Regulations Article 12.3):

1. Points obtained in all group matches (three points for a win, one for a draw, zero for a loss);
2. Goal difference in all group matches;
3. Number of goals scored in all group matches;
4. Points obtained in the matches played between the teams in question;
5. Goal difference in the matches played between the teams in question;
6. Number of goals scored in the matches played between the teams in question;
7. Fair play points in all group matches:
  - Yellow card: −1 points;
  - Indirect red card (two yellow cards): −3 points;
  - Direct red card: −4 points;
  - Yellow card and direct red card: −5 points;
8. Drawing of lots.

=== Group A ===
Pos	Team	Pld	W	D	L	GF	GA	GD	Pts	Qualification
1	Saint Kitts and Nevis	2	2	0	0	6	1	+5	6	2022 CONCACAF Women's U-17 Championship
2	Suriname	2	1	0	1	3	3	0	3	
3	U.S. Virgin Islands	2	0	0	2	2	7	−5	0	

Source: CONCACAF
Rules for classification: Qualifying stage tiebreakers
20 October 2021
11:00

Saint Kitts and Nevis	4–1	U.S. Virgin Islands
Blake 15'; Gumbs 25'; Nisbett 77'; Claxton 90+4'	Report	Rouse 56' (o.g.)

IMG Academy Field 1, Bradenton
Referee: Saphire Stockman (Costa Rica)

22 October 2021
11:00

Suriname	0–2	Saint Kitts and Nevis
	Report	Claxton 19'; Mills 67'

IMG Academy Field 1, Bradenton
Referee: Alyssa Nichols (United States)

24 October 2021
11:00

U.S. Virgin Islands	1–3	Suriname
Williams 21'	Report	Loe-A-Foe 55'; Felter 86'; Gallant 90+2' (pen.)

IMG Academy Field 1, Bradenton
Referee: Karitza Guerra (Honduras)

=== Group B ===
Pos	Team	Pld	W	D	L	GF	GA	GD	Pts	Qualification
1	Curaçao	2	2	0	0	5	1	+4	6	2022 CONCACAF Women's U-17 Championship
2	Belize	2	1	0	1	3	4	−1	3	
3	Barbados	2	0	0	2	1	4	−3	0	

Source: CONCACAF
Rules for classification: Qualifying stage tiebreakers
20 October 2021
11:10

Curaçao	3–1	Belize
Uraine 44', 90+2'; Thielman 45+2'	Report	Velasquez 52'

IMG Academy Field 2, Bradenton
Referee: Lizzet García (Mexico)

22 October 2021
11:10

Belize	2–1	Barbados
Velasquez 86' (pen.), 90+5'	Report	Rouse 42'

IMG Academy Field 2, Bradenton
Referee: Shandor Wilkinson (Saint Kitts and Nevis)

24 October 2021
11:10

Barbados	0–2	Curaçao
	Report	Seip 9'; Keller 90+3'

IMG Academy Field 2, Bradenton
Referee: Crystal Sobers (Trinidad and Tobago)

=== Group C ===
Pos	Team	Pld	W	D	L	GF	GA	GD	Pts	Qualification
1	Honduras	3	3	0	0	25	0	+25	9	2022 CONCACAF Women's U-17 Championship
2	Guyana	3	2	0	1	7	6	+1	6	2022 CONCACAF Women's U-17 Championship
3	Turks and Caicos Islands	3	0	1	2	0	13	−13	1 (Note: Disciplinary points: Turks and Caicos Islands -1, Anguilla -2.)	
4	Anguilla	3	0	1	2	0	13	−13	1	

Source: CONCACAF
Rules for classification: Qualifying stage tiebreakers
Notes:
28 October 2021
11:00

Anguilla	0–1	Guyana
	Report	Edwards 44'

IMG Academy Field 1, Bradenton
Referee: Annays Rosario (United States)
28 October 2021
11:10

Honduras	7–0	Turks and Caicos Islands
López 41', 60'; Arias 45+1', 48'; Henriquez 62', 77'; Cárdenas 87'	Report

IMG Academy Field 2, Bradenton
Referee: Mirian León (El Salvador)

30 October 2021
11:00

Turks and Caicos Islands	0–0	Anguilla
	Report

IMG Academy Field 1, Bradenton
Referee: Karen Hernández (Mexico)
30 October 2021
11:10

Guyana	0–6	Honduras
	Report	Rodríguez 28', 90+3' (pen.); Calix 29', 45', 48'; Henriquez 68'

IMG Academy Field 2, Bradenton
Referee: Sandra Benítez (El Salvador)

1 November 2021
11:00

Guyana	6–0	Turks and Caicos Islands
Willabus 21', 38'; Johnson 30', 82'; Trim 47', 53'	Report

IMG Academy Field 1, Bradenton
Referee: Neressa Goldson (Jamaica)
1 November 2021
11:10

Honduras	12–0	Anguilla
Meza 7'; Arias 18', 54' (pen.); Rodríguez 21', 24', 69'; Calix 38'; Henriquez 45'; Martínez 49', 65', 78'; Cárdenas 80'	Report

IMG Academy Field 2, Bradenton
Referee: Natalie Simon (United States)

== Ranking of second-placed teams ==
The ranking of the best second-place team was determined using a weighted points system (total number of points divided by the number of matches played).

Pos	Grp	Team	Pld	W	D	L	GF	GA	GD	Pts	PPG	
1	C	Guyana	3	2	0	1	7	6	+1	6	2.00	2022 CONCACAF Women's U-17 Championship
2	A	Suriname	2	1	0	1	3	3	0	3	1.50	
3	B	Belize	2	1	0	1	3	4	−1	3	1.50	

Source: CONCACAF
Rules for classification: 1. Points per game; 2. Goal difference; 3. Goals scored; 4. Fair play points; 5. Drawing of lots.

== Goalscorers ==
There were 52 goals scored in 12 matches, for an average of 4.33 goals per match.

5 goals

- (Honduras) Anyeli Rodríguez

4 goals

- (Honduras) Larissa Arias
- (Honduras) Karla Calix
- (Honduras) Susan Henriquez

3 goals

- (Belize) Khalydia Velasquez
- (Honduras) Natalie Martínez

2 goals

- (Curaçao) Draynishaina Uraine
- (Guyana) Sandra Johnson
- (Guyana) Jalade Trim
- (Guyana) Anaya Willabus
- (Honduras) Ericka Cardenas
- (Honduras) Geleen Lopez
- (Saint Kitts and Nevis) Jahzara Claxton

1 goal

- (Barbados) Kayghun Rouse
- (Curaçao) Raengelly Keller
- (Curaçao) Daylaina Seip
- (Curaçao) Julainy Thielman
- (Guyana) Sue Edwards
- (Honduras) Esther Meza
- (Saint Kitts and Nevis) Sharema Blake
- (Saint Kitts and Nevis) Mikayla Gumbs
- (Saint Kitts and Nevis) Kionna Mills
- (Saint Kitts and Nevis) Trisha Nisbett
- (Suriname) Shequeeni Felter
- (Suriname) Saveira Gallant
- (Suriname) Samanie Loe-A-Foe
- (United States Virgin Islands) Azlyn Williams

1 own goal

- (Saint Kitts and Nevis) Malaika Rouse (against the U.S. Virgin Islands)
