= Jade Bordeleau =

Canadian soccer player (born 2005)

- Bordeleau with NC State in 2026

Personal information
- Date of birth: February 8, 2005 (age 21)
- Place of birth: Bern, Switzerland
- Height: 5 ft 8 in (1.73 m)
- Position: Forward

Team information
- Current team: NC State Wolfpack
- Number: 13

College career
Years	Team	Apps	(Gls)
2023–	NC State Wolfpack	69	(29)

International career
2022	Canada U-17		

Jade Bordeleau (born February 8, 2005) is a Canadian college soccer player who plays as a forward for the NC State Wolfpack.

== Early life ==
Bordeleau was born in Bern, Switzerland, while her father, Sébastien, played ice hockey for SC Bern. She began playing soccer with AS Mascouche at age four. After her father retired in 2012, the family moved to Terrebonne, Quebec. She played there for the National Development Centre program PEF Québec.

== College career ==
Bordeleau played all 18 games and scored 2 goals for the NC State Wolfpack as a freshman in 2023. She led the team with 4 goals in 18 games as a sophomore in 2024. Under new head coach Gary Higgins, she enjoyed a breakout junior season in 2025, starting all 18 games and scoring 10 goals, including 7 in Atlantic Coast Conference (ACC) play. She was the first Wolfpack player to score 10 goals in a season since Tziarra King in 2019 and the first to earn second-team (or higher) All-ACC honors since Jameese Joseph in 2021. Beyond her good anticipation and finishing, Higgins praised the player for her work rate and pressing ability.

== International career ==
Bordeleau was part of the Canada under-17 squad that placed third at the 2022 CONCACAF Women's U-17 Championship.

== Personal life ==
Bordeleau is the daughter of former ice hockey player Thomas Bordeleau and gynecologist Chantal Dubois. Her brother, Thomas, and her grandfather, Paulin, also played ice hockey.

== Honors and awards ==
Individual

- First-team All-ACC: 2026
- Second-team All-ACC: 2025
