= Sébastien Bordeleau =

French ice hockey player (born 1975)

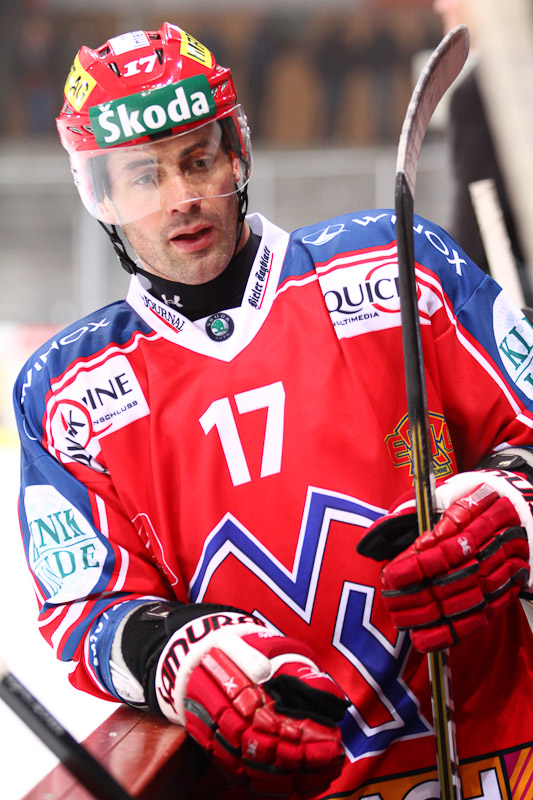
- Bordeleau in 2011
- Born: February 15, 1975 (age 51) Vancouver, British Columbia, Canada
- Height: 5 ft 11 in (180 cm)
- Weight: 183 lb (83 kg; 13 st 1 lb)
- Position: Centre
- Shot: Right
- Played for: Montreal Canadiens; Nashville Predators; Minnesota Wild; Phoenix Coyotes; SC Bern; EHC Biel
- National team: France
- NHL draft: 73rd overall, 1993; Montreal Canadiens
- Playing career: 1995–2012

Sébastien Ives Bordeleau (born February 15, 1975) is a Canadian-born French former professional ice hockey forward, who played in the National Hockey League. His father is former NHL player Paulin Bordeleau.

== Playing career ==
Born in Vancouver, British Columbia, while his father Paulin played for the Canucks, he spent several years growing up in France while his father played pro hockey there. As a youth, he played in the 1987 Quebec International Pee-Wee Hockey Tournament with team from France, and in the 1989 tournament with a minor ice hockey team from Lanaudière.

After returning to Canada he spent four years with the Hull Olympiques of the QMJHL. After being drafted by the Montreal Canadiens in the third round, 73rd overall in the 1993 NHL entry draft, the young forward was returned to his junior club to further develop his skills. His most productive year came in 1994–95 when he notched 52 goals.

During his first three pro seasons he played intermittently with Montreal, splitting his time with the AHL's Fredericton Canadiens. In the summer of 1998, Bordeleau was traded to the expansion Nashville Predators. He scored 16 goals and 40 points for the competitive first year club and was one of its top penalty killers. Bordeleau continued in the same role the next season, but saw less playing time in 2000–01. In the latter stages of the 2000–01 season, Bordeleau was claimed on waivers by the St. Louis Blues, yet saw only limited action with the club's AHL affiliate in Worcester before being claimed in the 2001 Waiver Draft by the Minnesota Wild.

Upon his arrival with the Wild, Bordeleau went on to split his time between the parent club and their AHL affiliate in Houston before being dealt to the Phoenix Coyotes prior to the midway point of the season. Bordeleau went on to play six games with the Coyotes, while seeing most of his action with the club's AHL affiliate in Springfield, before opting to head overseas for the 2002–03 season.

After competing for seven years in North America, Bordeleau made his debut for SC Bern in the Swiss National League in 2002–03.

== International play ==
Bordeleau represented France at the 2004 World Championships in Prague, Czech Republic, and at the 2008 World Championships in Quebec City, Canada.

== Personal life ==
Bordeleau is the son of former NHL player Paulin Bordeleau and the father of St. Louis Blues forward Thomas Bordeleau and NC State Wolfpack soccer player Jade Bordeleau.

== Career statistics ==
=== Regular season and playoffs ===
			Regular season					Playoffs
Season	Team	League	GP	G	A	Pts	PIM	GP	G	A	Pts	PIM
1991–92	Hull Olympiques	QMJHL	62	26	32	58	91	5	0	3	3	23
1992–93	Hull Olympiques	QMJHL	60	18	39	57	95	10	3	8	11	20
1993–94	Hull Olympiques	QMJHL	60	26	57	83	147	17	6	14	20	26
1994–95	Hull Olympiques	QMJHL	68	52	76	128	142	18	13	19	32	25
1994–95	Fredericton Canadiens	AHL	—	—	—	—	—	1	0	0	0	0
1995–96	Fredericton Canadiens	AHL	43	17	29	46	68	7	0	2	2	8
1995–96	Montreal Canadiens	NHL	4	0	0	0	0	—	—	—	—	—
1996–97	Fredericton Canadiens	AHL	33	17	21	38	50	—	—	—	—	—
1996–97	Montreal Canadiens	NHL	28	2	9	11	2	—	—	—	—	—
1997–98	Montreal Canadiens	NHL	53	6	8	14	36	5	0	0	0	2
1998–99	Nashville Predators	NHL	72	16	24	40	26	—	—	—	—	—
1999–00	Nashville Predators	NHL	60	10	13	23	30	—	—	—	—	—
2000–01	Nashville Predators	NHL	14	2	3	5	14	—	—	—	—	—
2000–01	Worcester IceCats	AHL	2	0	2	2	9	11	1	7	8	23
2001–02	Minnesota Wild	NHL	14	1	4	5	8	—	—	—	—	—
2001–02	Houston Aeros	AHL	16	4	7	11	23	—	—	—	—	—
2001–02	Springfield Falcons	AHL	34	9	10	19	54	—	—	—	—	—
2001–02	Phoenix Coyotes	NHL	6	0	0	0	2	—	—	—	—	—
2002–03	SC Bern	NLA	41	21	27	48	158	13	4	5	9	10
2003–04	SC Bern	NLA	37	18	31	49	52	14	10	4	14	14
2004–05	SC Bern	NLA	41	11	19	30	83	11	3	6	9	8
2005–06	SC Bern	NLA	44	24	30	54	56	4	3	5	8	6
2006–07	SC Bern	NLA	41	15	29	44	48	4	2	1	3	0
2007–08	SC Bern	NLA	47	22	25	47	40	6	3	2	5	2
2008–09	SC Bern	NLA	32	6	20	26	20	3	0	1	1	0
2009–10	EHC Biel	NLA	47	19	21	40	48	—	—	—	—	—
2010–11	EHC Biel	NLA	22	5	11	16	39	—	—	—	—	—
2011–12	EHC Biel	NLA	42	15	14	29	22	5	0	3	3	2
NHL totals			251	37	61	98	118	5	0	0	0	2

=== International ===
Year	Team	Comp	GP	G	A	Pts	PIM
2004	France	WC	5	0	0	0	4
2008	France	WC	5	2	4	6	6
Senior int'l totals			10	2	4	6	10
