= Maribel Flores =

Mexican soccer player (born 2005)

Personal information
- Full name: Maribel Flores Hernández
- Date of birth: January 8, 2005 (age 21)
- Place of birth: Fullerton, California, U.S.
- Height: 5 ft 6 in (1.68 m)
- Position: Left winger

Team information
- Current team: Braga

College career
| Years | Team | Apps | (Gls) |
| 2023–2025 | USC Trojans | 50 | (15) |

Senior career*
| Years | Team | Apps | (Gls) |
| 2026– | Braga | 0 | (0) |

International career^{‡}
| 2022 | Mexico U17 | 10 | (9) |
| 2023–2024 | Mexico U20 | 10 | (3) |
- * Club domestic league appearances and goals ‡ National team caps and goals as of September 11, 2024

Maribel Flores Hernández (born January 8, 2005) is an American–born Mexican professional soccer player who plays as a left winger for Campeonato Nacional Feminino club Braga. Born in the United States, she is a youth international for Mexico. She played college soccer for the USC Trojans, earning second-team All-American honors in 2025.

== Early life ==
Flores was born and raised in Fullerton, California, the daughter of Edith Hernandez and Jesus Flores. Her mother played soccer into her twenties, and her father played semi-professionally. Flores was raised by her mother and her grandparents. She attended Troy High School.

Flores began playing recreational soccer at around age five, soon scoring prolifically. She played club soccer for Fullerton Rangers, Strikers FC, and eventually Slammers FC, where she featured alongside future USC teammates Simone Jackson and Aaliyah Farmer. She led the Slammers to the ECNL under-16 national championship in 2021, being named the ECNL National Player of the Year, and the under-19 national title in 2023. She committed to play college soccer at Stanford when she was a junior, but after head coach Jane Alukonis took over at USC, she changed her commitment to the Trojans. She was ranked by TopDrawerSoccer as the No. 18 recruit of the 2023 class.

== College career ==
Flores led the USC Trojans with 6 goals and had 5 assists in 18 games (13 starts) in her freshman season in 2023. She helped the Trojans place third in the Pac-12 Conference, behind UCLA and Stanford, in what was the conference's final year, and reach the second round of the NCAA tournament. She was named the Pac-12 Freshman of the Year, third-team All-Pac-12, and second-team Freshman Best XI by TopDrawerSoccer. She missed the start of her sophomore season while at the 2024 FIFA U-20 Women's World Cup before returning to make 15 appearances off the bench in 2024. USC topped the Big Ten Conference and reached the quarterfinals of the NCAA tournament, falling to Wake Forest on penalties. She started all 17 games and scored 9 goals as a junior in 2025, being named first-team Big Ten, second-team All-American, and the Big Ten Midfielder of the Year. After three seasons at USC, she decided to go professional and give up her remaining year of college eligibility.

== Club career ==
In January 2026, Flores signed her first professional contract with Portuguese club Braga through 2027.

== International career ==
Flores was called into the United States youth national team at the under-17 level in 2021. However, she had promised her grandparents that she would represent Mexico and soon received that opportunity. She had a strong debut tournament with 8 goals and 7 assists at the 2022 CONCACAF Women's U-17 Championship, including the tying goal in the 2–1 final loss to the United States. She started all three games at the 2022 FIFA U-17 Women's World Cup, scoring the opener in a 2–1 win against eventual tournament champions Spain, but Mexico failed to get out of the group stage.

Flores helped lead Mexico to victory at the 2023 CONCACAF Women's U-20 Championship, starting all five games and scoring three goals during the group stage, before beating the United States 2–1 in the final. She suffered a torn meniscus the following May, but recovered to play in all four games (two starts) at the 2024 FIFA U-20 Women's World Cup, helping Mexico finish second in their group before losing 3–2 to the United States in the round of 16.

== Honors and awards ==
USC Trojans

- Big Ten Conference: 2024

Mexico U20

- CONCACAF Women's U-20 Championship: 2023

Individual

- Second-team All-American: 2025
- First-team All-Big Ten: 2025
- Third-team All-Pac-12: 2023
- Big Ten Midfielder of the Year: 2025
- Pac-12 Freshman of the Year: 2023
