= Daniela Meza =

Mexican footballer (born 2005)

Personal information
- Full name: Daniela Monserrat Meza Barba
- Date of birth: 28 February 2005 (age 21)
- Place of birth: Guadalajara, Jalisco, Mexico
- Height: 1.67 m (5 ft 6 in)
- Position: Centre-back

Team information
- Current team: Atlas
- Number: 25

Youth career
- 2021–2022: Atlas

Senior career*
Years	Team	Apps	(Gls)
2022–	Atlas	29	(0)

International career
2022	Mexico U-17		
- * Club domestic league appearances and goals as of 31 January 2026

Daniela Monserrat Meza Barba (born 28 February 2005) is a Mexican professional footballer who plays as a centre-back for Liga MX Femenil side Atlas.

== Club career ==
Meza is a product of Atlas youth academy, she started her career in 2022.

== International career ==
Meza was part of the Mexico U-17 side that participated at the 2022 FIFA U-17 Women's World Cup.
