= Alice Soto =

Mexican football player (born 2006)

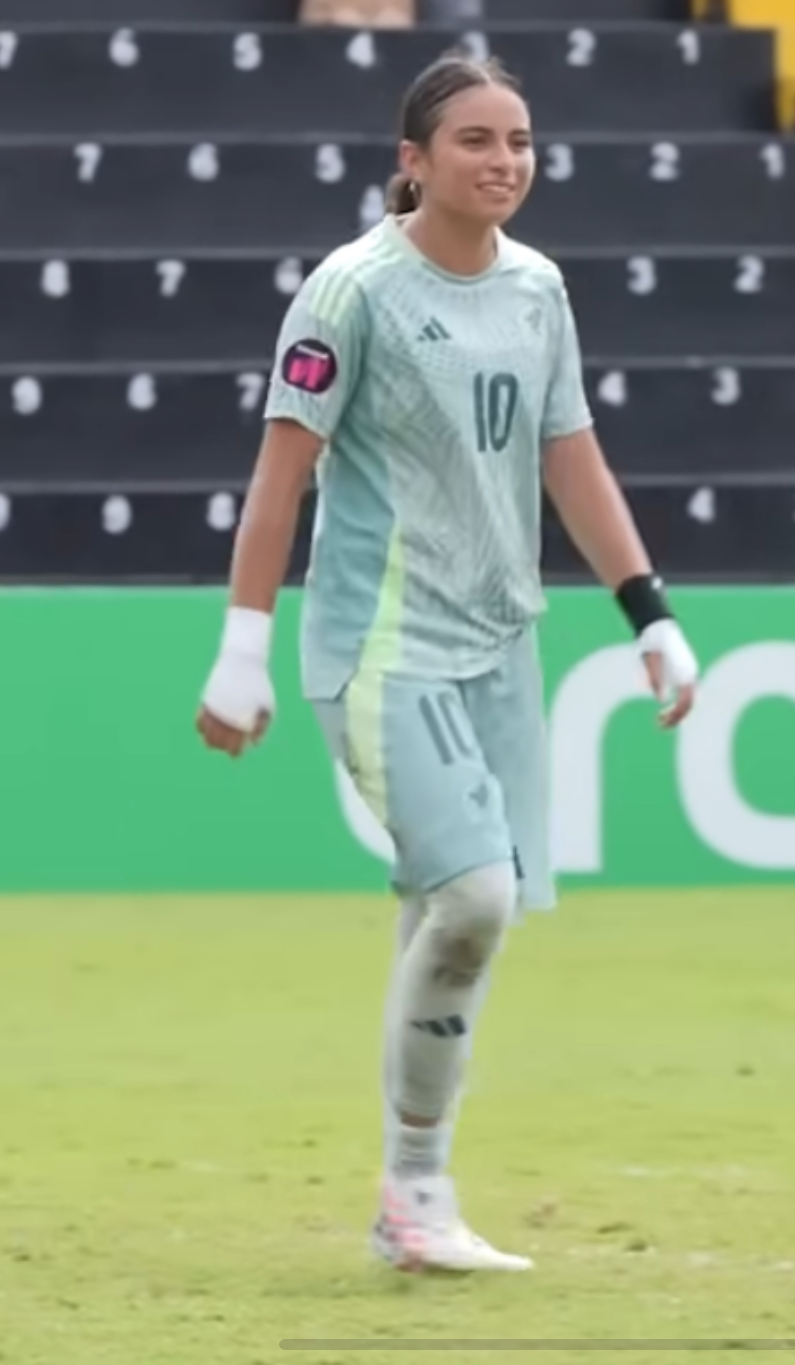
- Soto playing for the Mexican U-20 national team in 2025

Personal information
- Full name: Alice Fernanda Soto Gallegos
- Date of birth: 26 March 2006 (age 20)
- Place of birth: Salamanca, Guanajuato, Mexico
- Height: 1.58 m (5 ft 2 in)
- Position: Attacking midfielder

Team information
- Current team: Monterrey
- Number: 30

Youth career
- 2018–2020: Pachuca

Senior career*
Years	Team	Apps	(Gls)
2020–2024	Pachuca	114	(19)
2025–	Monterrey	31	(8)

International career^{‡}
2021–2022	Mexico U-17	9	(6)
2022–	Mexico U-20	17	(5)
2024–	Mexico	13	(8)
- * Club domestic league appearances and goals as of 1 February 2026 ‡ National team caps and goals as of 3 December 2025

Alice Fernanda Soto Gallegos (born 26 March 2006) is a Mexican professional footballer who plays as an attacking midfielder for Liga MX Femenil club Monterrey and the Mexico women's national football team.

== Club career ==
=== Pachuca (2018–2024) ===
In early 2018, Soto joined C.F. Pachuca’s youth academy. Later that year, at 12 years and two months old, she became the youngest professional female footballer to be registered with the Mexican Football Federation after Pachuca included her in the first-team roster for the 2018–19 Liga MX Femenil season. Soto would not play with Pachuca's first team until February 2020, when she made her Liga MX Femenil debut at age thirteen, as a 65th-minute substitute in a 5–0 home victory versus Querétaro.

By debuting at thirteen, Soto became the youngest player to have debuted in Liga MX Femenil, a record that can't be broken due to current Liga MX Femenil regulations prohibiting players under fifteen from playing professionally. On 28 March 2021, at fourteen, Soto became the youngest Mexican footballer to score a goal at a professional level after scoring Pachuca's only goal in a 0–1 victory over Puebla.

Soto's breakthrough year with Pachuca came in 2023, when she became a prominent starter during the Clausura 2023 tournament, helping her team reach the competition's final. Due to Soto being called to the Mexico women's national under-20 team to play the 2023 CONCACAF Women's U-20 Championship in the Dominican Republic, she had to leave her club in the middle of the playoffs. Mexico ended up winning the tournament, with Soto winning the best player of the tournament award as well. The day after the final of the U-20 Championship, Soto traveled back to Mexico to rejoin Pachuca just a few hours before the second leg of the Clausura 2023 final against Club América. She played the entire second half of the final, netting one goal, but Pachuca ended up losing to América by a 4–2 aggregate score. Due to her performances during the Clausura 2023, she was recognized by the league as the best female youth player of the 2022–23 season.

After her breakthrough with Pachuca during the Clausura 2023, Soto became a regular fixture until she left the club in December 2024.

=== Monterrey (2025–present) ===
After much speculation about her future, C.F. Monterrey announced on 27 December 2024 that Soto was joining their side after her exit from Pachuca.

== International career ==
=== Youth ===
Soto has been part of the Mexican women's national team football program since the youth level. In 2022, she participated with the Mexico women's national under-17 football team during the 2022 CONCACAF Women's U-17 Championship, in which she helped Mexico reach the final by netting six goals. Later that year, she was promoted to the Mexico U-20 women's national team and included as the youngest team member for the 2022 FIFA U-20 Women's World Cup, seeing action as a substitute in all games Mexico played during the competition. Additionally, she was also part of the Mexico U-17 team that participated in the 2022 FIFA U-17 Women's World Cup.

During the 2023 CONCACAF Women's U-20 Championship, Soto played an important role in Mexico reaching the final and winning the competition, with CONCACAF naming her the best player of the tournament. In 2024, Soto was included in Mexico's roster for the 2024 FIFA U-20 Women's World Cup, in which she started all four games that Mexico played during that tournament.

=== Senior ===
Soto was called to the Mexico senior team for the first time on 18 October 2024 for friendlies against Venezuela and Thailand. She made her debut with the senior team as a 45th-minute substitute during the match against Thailand, in which she also netted two goals.

== Career statistics ==
=== Club ===
As of the match played on 12 April 2025

Appearances and goals by club, season and competition
Club	Season	League			League Cup (Note: Includes Summer Cup)		Total	
Club	Season	Division	Apps	Goals	Apps	Goals	Apps	Goals
C.F. Pachuca	2019–20	Liga MX Femenil	2	0	—		2	0
C.F. Pachuca	2020–21	Liga MX Femenil	16	2	—		16	2
C.F. Pachuca	2021–22	Liga MX Femenil	22	2	—		22	2
C.F. Pachuca	2022–23	Liga MX Femenil	23	5	—		23	5
C.F. Pachuca	2023–24	Liga MX Femenil	37	9	—		37	9
C.F. Pachuca	2024–25	Liga MX Femenil	14	1	3	0	17	1
C.F. Pachuca	Total		114	19	3	0	117	19
C.F. Monterrey	2024–25	Liga MX Femenil	13	4	—		13	4
C.F. Monterrey	Total		13	4	—		13	4
Career total			127	23	3	0	130	23

=== International ===
As of the match played on 2 December 2025

Appearances and goals by national team and year
National team	Year	Apps	Goals
Mexico	2024	4	2
Mexico	2025	9	6
Total		13	8

List of international goals scored by Alice Soto
No.	Date	Venue	Opponent	Score	Result	Competition
1.	29 October 2024	Estadio Nemesio Diez, Toluca, Mexico	Thailand	2–0	4–0	Friendly
2.	29 October 2024	Estadio Nemesio Diez, Toluca, Mexico	Thailand	4–0	4–0	Friendly
3.	19 February 2025	Pinatar Arena, San Pedro del Pinatar, Spain	Chinese Taipei	1–0	4–0	2025 Pinatar Cup
4.	25 February 2025	Pinatar Arena, San Pedro del Pinatar, Spain	China	1–0	2–0	2025 Pinatar Cup
5.	8 April 2025	Shell Energy Stadium, Houston, United States	Jamaica	2–0	4–0	Friendly
6.	8 April 2025	Shell Energy Stadium, Houston, United States	Jamaica	4–0	4–0	Friendly
7.	29 November 2025	Arnos Vale Stadium, Kingstown, Saint Vincent and the Grenadines	Saint Vincent and the Grenadines	6–0	14–0	2026 CONCACAF W Championship qualification
8.	2 December 2025	Complejo Deportivo FCRF-Plycem, San José, Costa Rica	Costa Rica	1–0	2–0	Friendly

== Honours ==
Mexico U-20

- CONCACAF Women's U-20 Championship: 2023

Individual

- CONCACAF Women's U-20 Championship Golden Ball: 2023
