= Jimena González =

Spanish politician (born 1987)

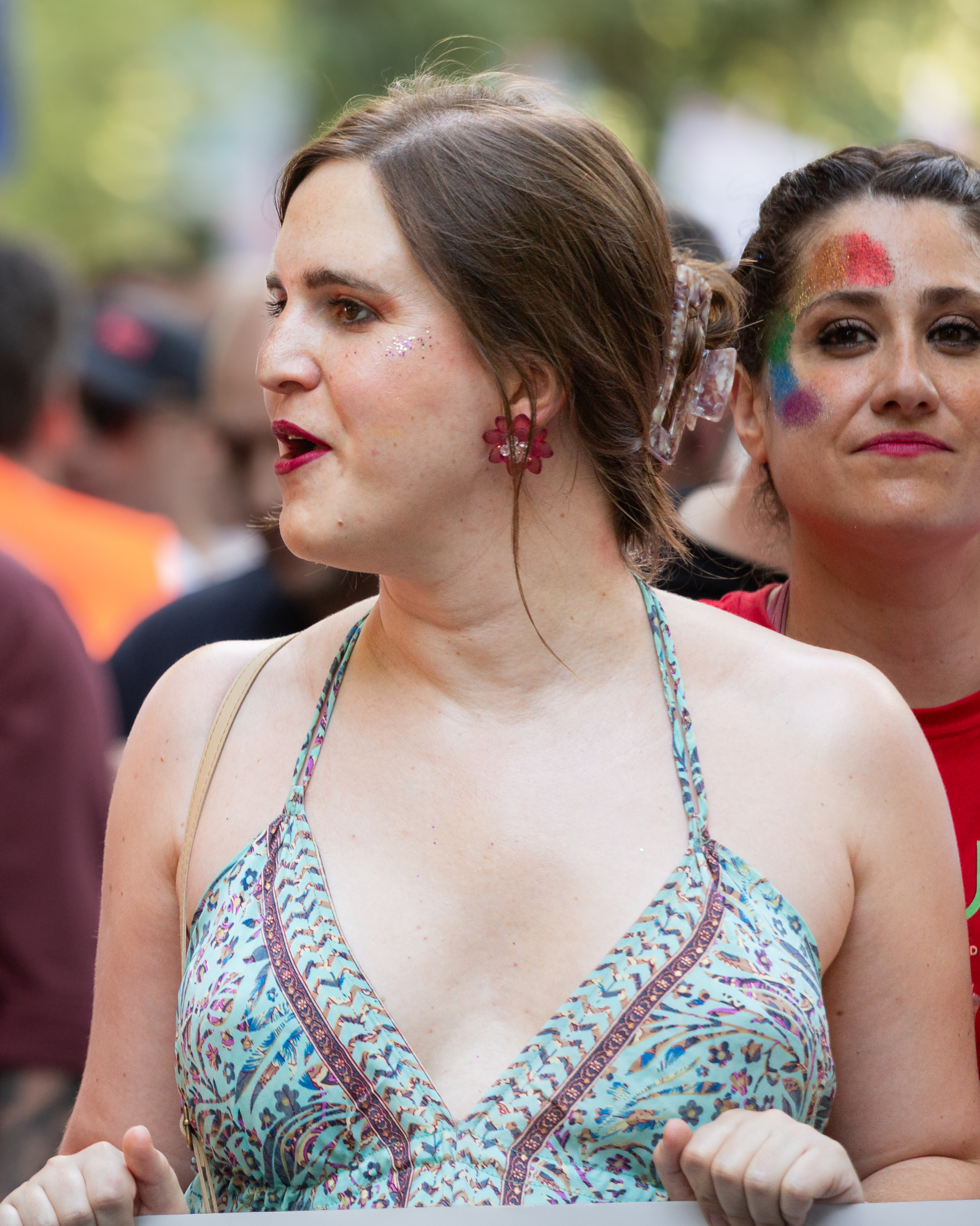
Jimena González at the 2024 Madrid Pride Parade

Jimena González Gómez (born 1987) is a Spanish academic and politician of the party Más Madrid. She was elected to the Assembly of Madrid in the 2023 regional election.

== Biography ==
González was born in Cáceres, Extremadura. She graduated in Romance philology and Arabic philology from the University of Seville. As of 2021, she was studying for a master's degree at the Diplomatic School of Spain.

González ran in the 2021 Madrilenian regional election, as 28th on the Más Madrid list. She was the first transgender person to run for election under a preferred given name rather than a legal given name, which she no longer used. This was due to a law passed by the Assembly of Madrid in 2016, which allowed for a preferred name to be used, as long as it was used as such elsewhere, in this case her employment at the Complutense University of Madrid. A previous compromise offered by the electoral board was for the name Jimena to appear in brackets after the legal name – as used for the mayor of Cádiz, José María González Santos, nicknamed "Kichi" – which González considered even worse than the legal name on its own. Más Madrid took 24 seats, meaning that González was not elected.

González was elected to the District Council in Chamberí, the Madrid neighbourhood where she resides. In March 2023, a councillor from Vox addressed her by a male title and male form of her given name, for which he was expelled from the plenary session after refusing to apologise. González later said "I used to be called Jaime, I have no problem with that name, I don't have a traumatic relationship with it. But when they call us by our previous names every day or use old photos to grind away at us, it ends up making a lot of trans people develop a traumatic relationship with their past".

González was 25th on the Más Madrid list for the 2023 Madrilenian regional election. On election day, she alleged that a representative of Vox called her a "marimacho", a derogatory term for a woman who is considered to be masculine. The party received 27 seats, meaning she was elected.

In April 2025, González defended a plan by the Ministry of Education and the Moroccan embassy to teach Arabic at state schools in Spain. The proposal had been opposed by Vox.

In September 2025 González took part in the Thousand Madleens to Gaza campaign, a Freedom Flotilla working in coordination with the Global Sumud Flotilla, aiming to break the blockade on Gaza. She told El País that the People's Party "acts as if it were an Israeli office in Spain, defending Israel's official propaganda above any humanitarian moral consideration".
