= Brenda Vega =

Mexican footballer (born 2005)

Personal information
- Full name: Brenda Vega Garcia
- Date of birth: 22 July 2005 (age 21)
- Place of birth: Hidalgo, Mexico
- Height: 1.73 m (5 ft 8 in)
- Position: Centre-back

Senior career*
Years	Team	Apps	(Gls)
2021–2025	Toluca	33	(3)
2025	Necaxa	15	(0)

International career
2023	Mexico U-20		
- * Club domestic league appearances and goals as of 2 February 2026

Brenda Vega García (born 22 July 2005) is a Mexican footballer who played as a centre-back for Liga MX Femenil club Necaxa.

== Career ==
In 2021, she started her career in Toluca. In 2025, she joined Necaxa.

== International career ==
Since 2023, Vega has been part of the Mexico U-20 team.
