= Silvana González =

Mexican footballer (born 2006)

Personal information
- Full name: Silvana González Díaz Barreiro
- Date of birth: 24 October 2006 (age 20)
- Place of birth: San Luis Potosí City, San Luis Potosí, Mexico
- Height: 1.65 m (5 ft 5 in)
- Position: Winger

Team information
- Current team: Toluca
- Number: 28

Youth career
- 2021–2022: Atlético San Luis

Senior career*
Years	Team	Apps	(Gls)
2022–2026	Atlético San Luis	101	(10)
2026–	Toluca	0	(0)

International career^{‡}
2023–	Mexico U-20		
- * Club domestic league appearances and goals as of 6 February 2026 ‡ National team caps and goals as of 12 March 2022

Silvana González Díaz Barreiro (born 24 October 2006) is a Mexican professional footballer who plays as a Winger for Liga MX Femenil side Toluca.

== Career ==
In 2022, she started her career in Atlético San Luis.

== International career ==
Since 2023, González has been part of the Mexico U-20 team.
