= Onyeka Gamero =

American soccer player (born 2006)

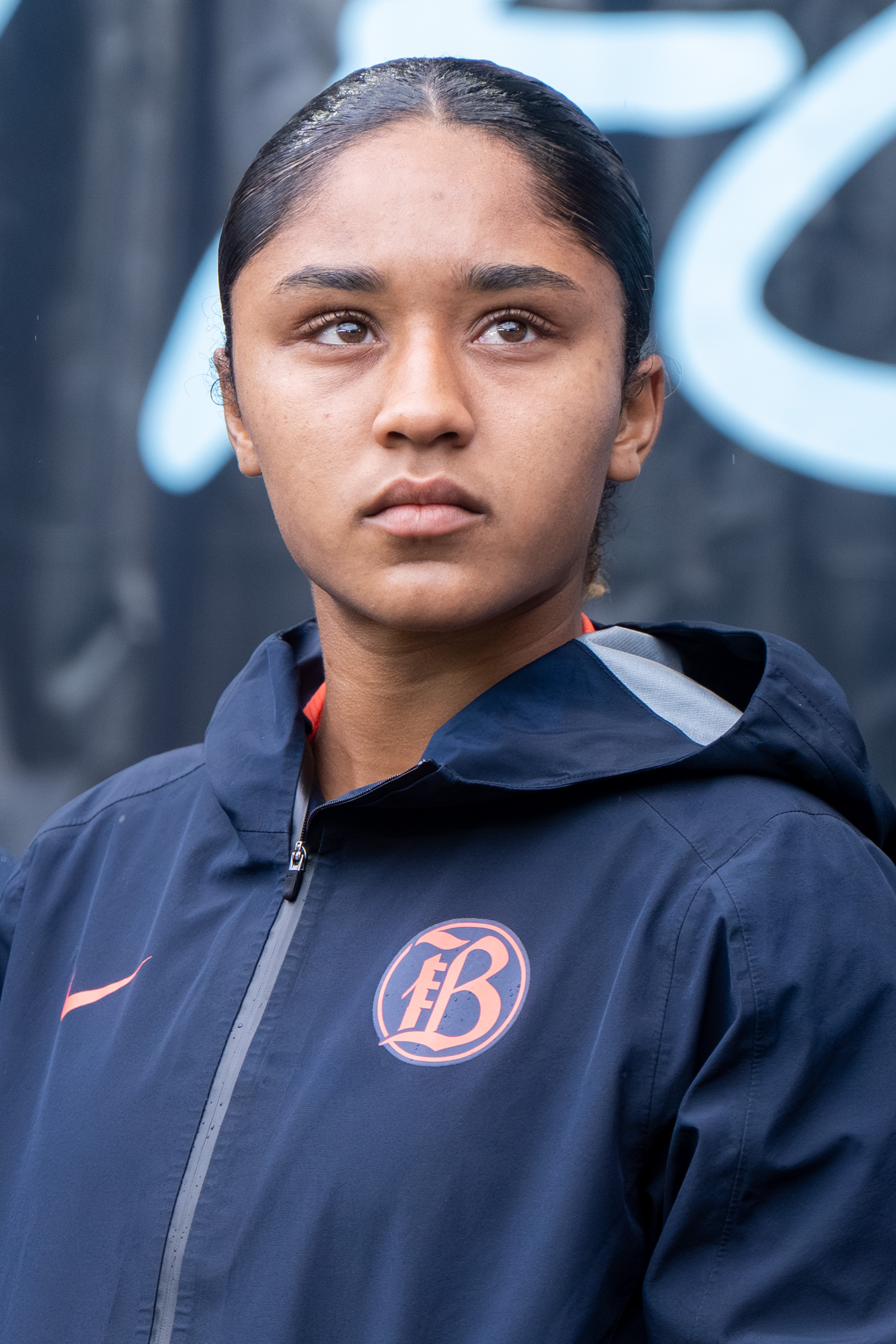
- Gamero with Bay FC in 2026

Personal information
- Full name: Onyeka Paloma Gamero
- Date of birth: February 23, 2006 (age 20)
- Place of birth: Cerritos, California, U.S.
- Height: 1.62 m (5 ft 4 in)
- Position: Forward

Team information
- Current team: Dallas Trinity (on loan from Bay FC)
- Number: 2

Senior career*
Years	Team	Apps	(Gls)
2023–2025	Barcelona B		
2025–	Bay FC	5	(0)
2026–	→ Dallas Trinity (loan)	0	(0)

International career
- United States U-17
- United States U-20
- * Club domestic league appearances and goals as of August 10, 2026

Onyeka Paloma Gamero (born February 23, 2006) is an American professional soccer player who plays as a forward for USL Super League club Dallas Trinity, on loan from Bay FC.

== Club career ==
Gamero signed with Barcelona B on June 28, 2023. She scored two goals and provided one assist in nine appearances before tearing her ACL and meniscus at the end of November.

On July 15, 2025, Bay FC acquired Gamero in exchange for an undisclosed transfer fee and signed her to a multi-year contract.

On August 12, 2026, Gamero was sent on loan to USL Super League club Dallas Trinity until the end of the year.

== International career ==
Gamero has represented the United States at youth level at the 2022 FIFA U-17 Women's World Cup.

== Personal life ==
Gamero is of Spanish descent via her father and Nigerian descent by mother.
