= Michel Fong =

Mexican footballer (born 2006)

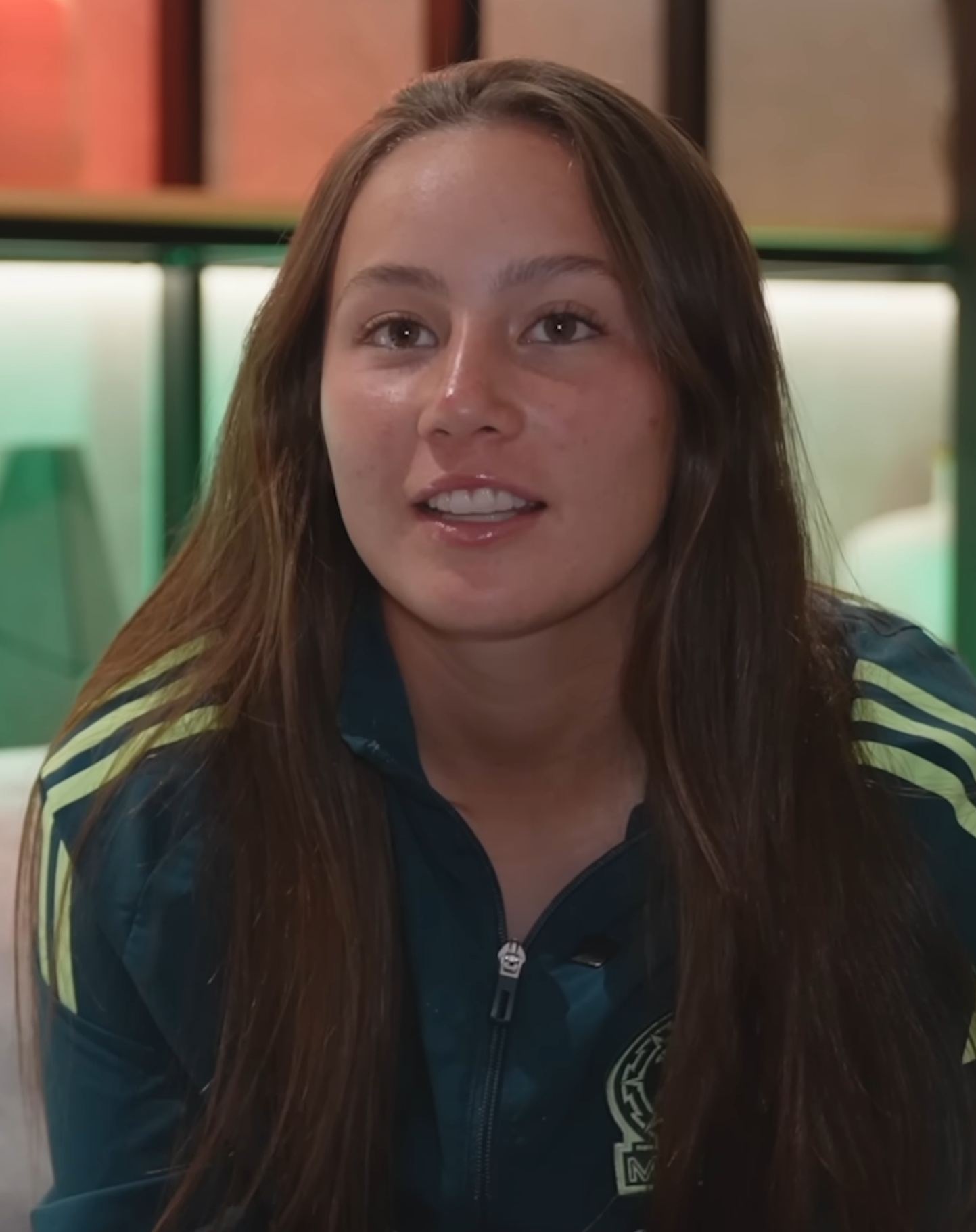
- Fong in 2025

Personal information
- Full name: Michel Jacquelin Fong Camargan
- Date of birth: 2 June 2006 (age 20)
- Place of birth: Tijuana, Baja California, Mexico
- Height: 1.57 m (5 ft 2 in)
- Position: Right-back

Team information
- Current team: Tijuana
- Number: 24

Youth career
- 2022: Tijuana

Senior career*
Years	Team	Apps	(Gls)
2022–	Tijuana	85	(0)

International career^{‡}
2023–	Mexico U-20		
- * Club domestic league appearances and goals as of 9 February 2026 ‡ National team caps and goals as of 12 March 2022

Michel Jacquelin Fong Camargan (born 2 June 2006) is a Mexican professional footballer who plays as a right-back for Liga MX Femenil club Tijuana.

== Career ==
In 2022, she started her career in Tijuana.

== International career ==
Since 2023, Fong has been part of the Mexico U-20 team.
