= Tatiana Flores =

Mexican footballer (born 2005)

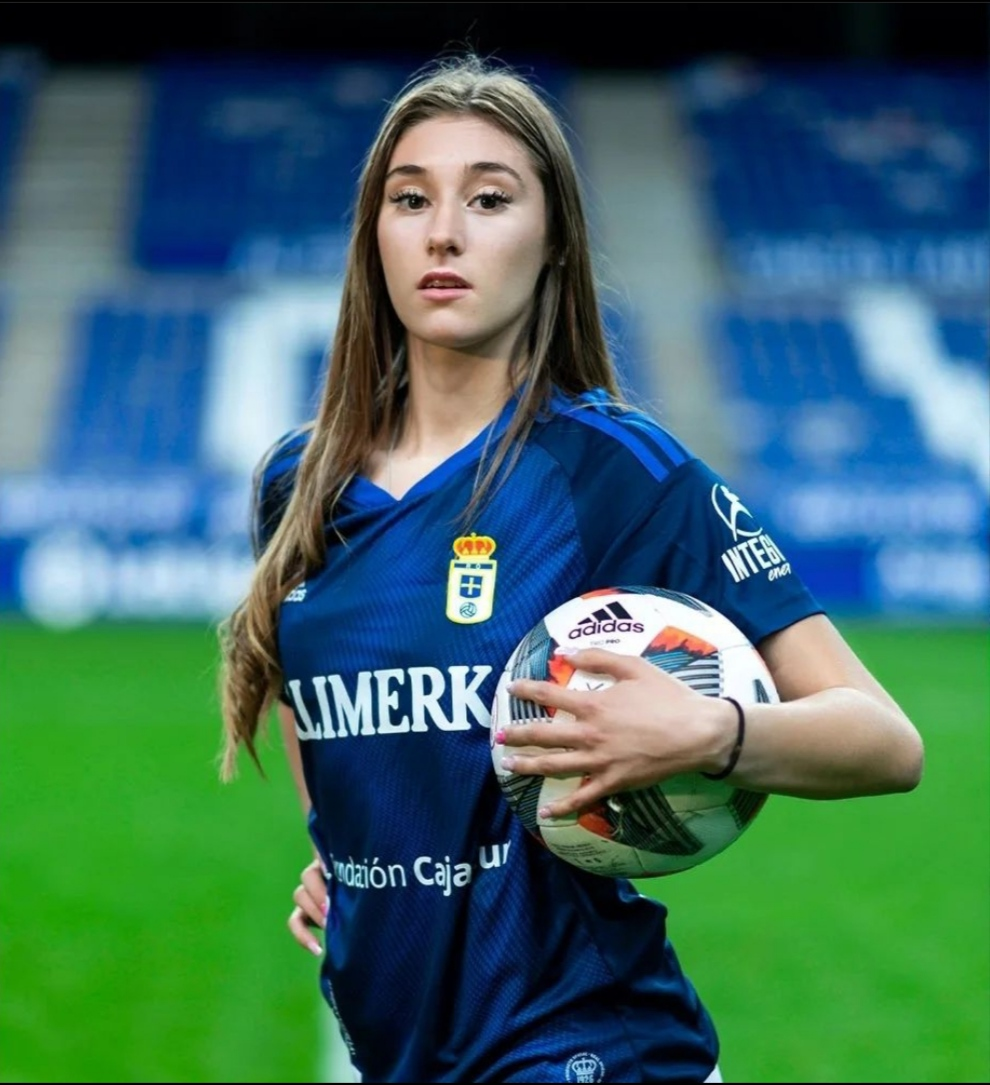
- Flores with Real Oviedo in 2022

Personal information
- Full name: Tatiana Flores Dorrell
- Date of birth: 15 September 2005 (age 21)
- Place of birth: Georgetown, Ontario, Canada
- Height: 1.72 m (5 ft 8 in)
- Position: Forward

Team information
- Current team: UANL
- Number: 19

Youth career
- 2020–2023: Chelsea
- 2023: Atlético Madrid

Senior career*
Years	Team	Apps	(Gls)
2023	→ Oviedo (loan)	10	(2)
2024–	UANL	18	(1)

International career^{‡}
2022	Mexico U17	10	(9)
2022–	Mexico U20	12	(2)
- * Club domestic league appearances and goals as of 2 September 2025 ‡ National team caps and goals as of 4 June 2023

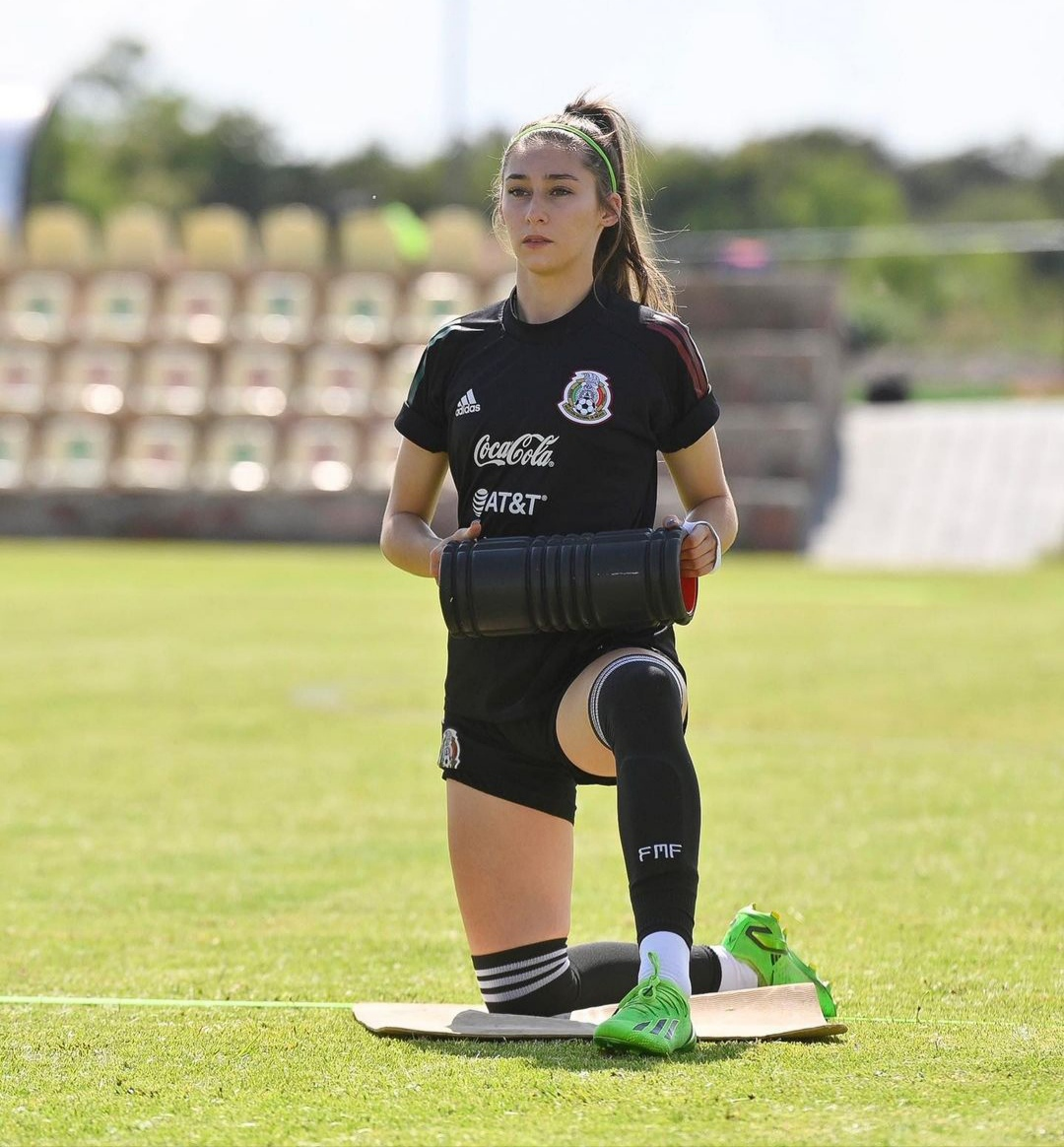
Tatiana Flores

Tatiana Flores Dorrell (born 15 September 2005) is a professional footballer who plays as a forward for Liga MX Femenil club Tigres UANL. Born in Canada and raised in England to a Mexican father and a Canadian mother of English descent, she represents Mexico at the youth international level. She is the youngest daughter of football manager Rubén Flores and the younger sister of fellow footballers Silvana Flores and Marcelo Flores.
