= 2010 CONCACAF Women's World Cup Qualifying squads =

The 2010 CONCACAF Women's World Cup Qualifying was an international women's football tournament held in Mexico from 28 October–8 November 2010. The eight national teams involved in the tournament were required to register a squad of 20 players, including two goalkeepers. Only players in these squads were eligible to take part in the tournament.

The position listed for each player is per the official squad list published by CONCACAF. The age listed for each player is on 28 October 2010, the first day of the tournament. The numbers of caps and goals listed for each player do not include any matches played after the start of tournament. The nationality for each club reflects the national association (not the league) to which the club is affiliated.

== Group A ==
=== Canada ===
The squad was announced on 27 October 2010.

Coach: (Italy) Carolina Morace

No.	Pos.	Player	Date of birth (age)	Club
1	GK	Karina LeBlanc	30 March 1980 (aged 30)	(United States Soccer Federation) Philadelphia Independence
2	DF	Emily Zurrer	12 July 1987 (aged 23)	(Canadian Soccer Association) Vancouver Whitecaps FC
3	MF	Desiree Scott	31 July 1987 (aged 23)	(Canadian Soccer Association) Vancouver Whitecaps FC
4	MF	Carmelina Moscato	2 August 1984 (aged 26)	Unattached
5	DF	Robyn Gayle	31 October 1985 (aged 24)	(Canadian Soccer Association) Vancouver Whitecaps FC
6	MF	Kaylyn Kyle	6 October 1988 (aged 22)	(Canadian Soccer Association) Surrey United
7	DF	Rhian Wilkinson	12 May 1982 (aged 28)	(Norwegian Football Federation) LSK Kvinner
8	MF	Diana Matheson	6 April 1984 (aged 26)	(Norwegian Football Federation) LSK Kvinner
9	DF	Candace Chapman	2 April 1983 (aged 27)	(United States Soccer Federation) FC Gold Pride
10	FW	Christina Julien	6 May 1988 (aged 22)	(Canadian Soccer Association) Ottawa Fury
11	FW	Josée Bélanger	14 May 1986 (aged 24)	(Canadian Soccer Association) Quebec City Amiral SC
12	FW	Christine Sinclair	12 June 1983 (aged 27)	(United States Soccer Federation) FC Gold Pride
13	MF	Sophie Schmidt	28 June 1988 (aged 22)	(United States Soccer Federation) Portland Pilots
14	FW	Melissa Tancredi	27 December 1981 (aged 28)	(Canadian Soccer Association) Vancouver Whitecaps FC
15	FW	Kara Lang	22 October 1986 (aged 24)	(Canadian Soccer Association) Vancouver Whitecaps FC
16	FW	Jonelle Filigno	24 September 1990 (aged 20)	(United States Soccer Federation) Rutgers Scarlet Knights
17	MF	Chelsea Stewart	28 April 1990 (aged 20)	(United States Soccer Federation) Vanderbilt Commodores
19	MF	Brooke McCalla	7 September 1987 (aged 23)	(Canadian Soccer Association) Toronto Lady Lynx
20	DF	Marie-Eve Nault	16 February 1982 (aged 28)	(Canadian Soccer Association) Ottawa Fury
22	GK	Stephanie Labbé	10 October 1986 (aged 24)	(Swedish Football Association) Piteå IF

=== Guyana ===
Coach: Mark Rodrigues

No.	Pos.	Player	Date of birth (age)	Club
1	GK	Catherine Kobelka	24 November 1982 (aged 27)	(Canadian Soccer Association) Scarborough Azzurri
2	FW	Alison Heydorn	5 December 1984 (aged 25)	(Canadian Soccer Association) Hamilton Avalanche
3	DF	Briana DeSouza	22 May 1991 (aged 19)	Unattached
4	MF	Ashlee Savona	12 December 1992 (aged 17)	(Canadian Soccer Association) Oakville Phantoms
5	DF	Donna Carvalhal	6 July 1981 (aged 29)	Unattached
6	DF	Collette Hope	21 December 1980 (aged 29)	Unattached
7	DF	Justine Rodrigues	17 May 1993 (aged 17)	Unattached
8	MF	Tessa Edwards	16 August 1994 (aged 16)	(Canadian Soccer Association) Pickering Power
9	FW	Ashley Rodrigues	12 September 1988 (aged 22)	(United States Soccer Federation) Eastern Michigan Eagles
10	MF	Kayla DeSouza	7 March 1990 (aged 20)	Unattached
11	FW	Brittany Persaud	1 April 1990 (aged 20)	(United States Soccer Federation) Wright State Raiders
12	DF	Karina Moore	29 March 1993 (aged 17)	(United States Soccer Federation) Houston Dynamo Gulf Coast
13	DF	Roseanna George	19 September 1988 (aged 22)	Unattached
14	FW	Melissia Elie	12 November 1991 (aged 18)	(United States Soccer Federation) Farmingdale State Rams
15	MF	Mariam El-Masri	20 June 1991 (aged 19)	(Canadian Soccer Association) Pickering Power
17	DF	Chantal Lynch	16 September 1993 (aged 17)	(Canadian Soccer Association) Master's FA
18	GK	Ronette Cort	24 May 1979 (aged 31)	Unattached
19	MF	Olivia Gonsalves	22 July 1993 (aged 17)	(Canadian Soccer Association) West Rouge Storm

=== Mexico ===
Head coach: Leonardo Cuéllar

No.	Pos.	Player	Date of birth (age)	Club
1	GK	Erika Vanegas	7 July 1988 (aged 22)	(Mexican Football Federation) Mexico FC
2	DF	Kenti Robles	15 February 1991 (aged 19)	(Royal Spanish Football Federation) Espanyol
3	DF	Marlene Sandoval	18 January 1984 (aged 26)	(Mexican Football Federation) Mexico FC
4	DF	Natalie Vinti	2 January 1988 (aged 22)	(United States Soccer Federation) San Diego Toreros
5	DF	María de Jesús Castillo	6 July 1983 (aged 27)	(Mexican Football Federation) Mexico FC
6	MF	Mónica Vergara	2 May 1983 (aged 27)	(Mexican Football Federation) Mexico FC
7	MF	Evelyn López	25 December 1978 (aged 31)	(Mexican Football Federation) Mexico FC
8	MF	Lupita Worbis	12 December 1983 (aged 26)	(Mexican Football Federation) Borregos Salvajes
9	FW	Maribel Domínguez	18 November 1978 (aged 31)	(Royal Spanish Football Federation) L'Estartit
10	FW	Dinora Garza	24 January 1988 (aged 22)	(Mexican Football Federation) UANL
11	MF	Nayeli Rangel	28 February 1992 (aged 18)	(Mexican Football Federation) UANL
12	GK	Pamela Tajonar	2 December 1984 (aged 25)	(Mexican Football Federation) Borregos Salvajes
13	DF	Natalie Garcia	30 January 1990 (aged 20)	(United States Soccer Federation) San Diego Toreros
14	DF	Alina Garciamendez	16 April 1991 (aged 19)	(United States Soccer Federation) Stanford Cardinal
15	DF	Luz Saucedo	14 December 1983 (aged 26)	(Mexican Football Federation) Mexico FC
16	MF	Liliana Mercado	22 October 1988 (aged 22)	(Mexican Football Federation) Aztecas UDLAP
17	MF	Tania Morales	22 December 1986 (aged 23)	(Mexican Football Federation) Mexico FC
18	FW	Verónica Pérez	18 May 1988 (aged 22)	(United States Soccer Federation) Saint Louis Athletica
19	FW	Stephany Mayor	23 September 1991 (aged 19)	(Mexican Football Federation) Aztecas UDLAP
20	GK	Cecilia Santiago	19 October 1994 (aged 16)	(Mexican Football Federation) Santos Laguna

=== Trinidad and Tobago ===
Head coach: Jamaal Shabazz

No.	Pos.	Player	Date of birth (age)	Club
1	GK	Kimika Forbes	28 August 1990 (aged 20)	(Trinidad and Tobago Football Association) Tobago United
2	DF	Ayana Russell	16 March 1988 (aged 22)	(United States Soccer Federation) Alabama Crimson Tide
3	DF	Katrina Meyer	23 September 1986 (aged 24)	(United States Soccer Federation) Miami Kickers
4	DF	Anastacia Prescott	27 June 1987 (aged 23)	(Trinidad and Tobago Football Association) Malick City
5	DF	Arin King	8 February 1991 (aged 19)	(Canadian Soccer Association) Pickering FC
6	MF	Jemilia Mathlin	7 June 1986 (aged 24)	(Trinidad and Tobago Football Association) Real Dimensions
7	MF	Dernelle Mascall	20 October 1988 (aged 22)	(Trinidad and Tobago Football Association) United Petrotrin
8	DF	Rhea Belgrave	19 July 1991 (aged 19)	(Trinidad and Tobago Football Association) Real Dimensions
9	FW	Maylee Atthin-Johnson	9 May 1986 (aged 24)	(Trinidad and Tobago Football Association) Malick City
10	MF	Tasha St. Louis	20 February 1983 (aged 27)	(Trinidad and Tobago Football Association) San Juan Jabloteh
11	MF	Janine François	1 January 1989 (aged 21)	(Trinidad and Tobago Football Association) Real Dimensions
12	DF	Afiya Matthias	20 March 1982 (aged 28)	(Trinidad and Tobago Football Association) Real Dimensions
13	FW	Candace Edwards	16 November 1988 (aged 21)	(Trinidad and Tobago Football Association) Tobago United
14	MF	Karyn Forbes	27 August 1991 (aged 19)	(Trinidad and Tobago Football Association) Tobago United
15	DF	Patrice Superville	18 April 1987 (aged 23)	(Trinidad and Tobago Football Association) Real Dimensions
16	DF	Danielle Blair	16 June 1988 (aged 22)	(United States Soccer Federation) Alabama Crimson Tide
17	MF	Natasha St. Louis	1 November 1991 (aged 18)	(Trinidad and Tobago Football Association) Real Dimensions
18	MF	Akeelha Mollon	4 February 1985 (aged 25)	Unattached
19	FW	Kennya Cordner	11 November 1981 (aged 28)	(Trinidad and Tobago Football Association) Tobago United
21	GK	Nicole Mitchell	23 July 1975 (aged 35)	(Trinidad and Tobago Football Association) San Juan Jabloteh

== Group B ==
=== Costa Rica ===
The squad was announced on 21 October 2010.

Head coach: Randall Chacón

No.	Pos.	Player	Date of birth (age)	Club
1	GK	Dinnia Díaz	14 January 1988 (aged 22)	(Costa Rican Football Federation) Arenal Coronado
2	MF	Silvia Betancourt	8 September 1989 (aged 21)	(United States Soccer Federation) Deportivo Saprissa
3	DF	Hazel Quirós	7 July 1992 (aged 18)	(Costa Rican Football Federation) UCEM-Alajuela
4	FW	Ana Gabriela Aguilar	14 November 1990 (aged 19)	(Costa Rican Football Federation) San José
5	MF	Ivonne Rodríguez	23 March 1986 (aged 24)	(Costa Rican Football Federation) San José
6	DF	Carol Sánchez	16 April 1986 (aged 24)	(Costa Rican Football Federation) Arenal Coronado
7	MF	María Fernanda Barrantes	12 April 1989 (aged 21)	(Costa Rican Football Federation) UCEM-Alajuela
8	DF	Daniela Cruz	8 March 1991 (aged 19)	(Costa Rican Football Federation) Flores-Heredia
9	FW	Carolina Venegas	28 September 1991 (aged 19)	(Costa Rican Football Federation) Arenal Coronado
10	MF	Shirley Cruz	28 August 1985 (aged 25)	(French Football Federation) Lyon
11	FW	Raquel Rodríguez	28 October 1993 (aged 17)	(Costa Rican Football Federation) San José
12	FW	Laura Sánchez	7 September 1985 (aged 25)	(Costa Rican Football Federation) UCEM-Alajuela
13	MF	Yuliana Rodríguez	12 November 1989 (aged 20)	(Costa Rican Football Federation) UCEM-Alajuela
14	MF	Cristin Granados	19 August 1989 (aged 21)	(Costa Rican Football Federation) Arenal Coronado
15	FW	Mónica Malavassi	25 April 1989 (aged 21)	(United States Soccer Federation) West Florida Argonauts
16	MF	Katherine Alvarado	11 April 1991 (aged 19)	(Costa Rican Football Federation) San José
17	FW	Jacqueline Álvarez	19 December 1977 (aged 32)	(Costa Rican Football Federation) Flores-Heredia
18	GK	Priscilla Tapia	2 May 1991 (aged 19)	(Costa Rican Football Federation) UCEM-Alajuela
19	FW	Adriana Venegas	12 June 1989 (aged 21)	(Costa Rican Football Federation) Arenal Coronado
20	DF	Wendy Acosta	19 December 1989 (aged 20)	(United States Soccer Federation) Fairleigh Dickinson Knights

=== Guatemala ===
Head coach: Raúl Fernando Calderón

No.	Pos.	Player	Date of birth (age)	Club
1	GK	Maricruz Lemus	12 August 1992 (aged 18)	(National Football Federation of Guatemala) Jutiapa
3	DF	Idania Pérez	3 June 1992 (aged 18)	Unattached
4	DF	Gloria Lohaiza	22 April 1987 (aged 23)	(National Football Federation of Guatemala) Profutbol
5	MF	Londy Barrios	8 April 1992 (aged 18)	(National Football Federation of Guatemala) UNIFUT
6	DF	Marilyn Rivera	19 February 1992 (aged 18)	(National Football Federation of Guatemala) UNIFUT
7	FW	Wendy Pineda	9 July 1989 (aged 21)	(National Football Federation of Guatemala) Champions
8	DF	María Monterroso	30 November 1993 (aged 16)	(National Football Federation of Guatemala) UNIFUT
9	DF	Daniela Méndez	18 April 1991 (aged 19)	(National Football Federation of Guatemala) Pares
10	MF	Gladys Suriano	26 December 1985 (aged 24)	(National Football Federation of Guatemala) Champions
11	MF	Rocío Sosa	24 August 1990 (aged 20)	(National Football Federation of Guatemala) Comunicaciones
12	MF	Cinthya López	23 August 1993 (aged 17)	(National Football Federation of Guatemala) UNIFUT
13	MF	Ana Lucía Martínez	8 January 1990 (aged 20)	(National Football Federation of Guatemala) UNIFUT
14	DF	Coralia Monterroso	26 December 1991 (aged 18)	(National Football Federation of Guatemala) UNIFUT
15	DF	Andrea Véliz	11 February 1993 (aged 17)	(National Football Federation of Guatemala) UNIFUT
16	DF	Kimberly de León	29 August 1989 (aged 21)	(National Football Federation of Guatemala) Barcenas
17	FW	Sheny Vega	6 June 1989 (aged 21)	(National Football Federation of Guatemala) Monjas
18	MF	Daniela Andrade	4 April 1992 (aged 18)	(National Football Federation of Guatemala) Pares
19	MF	Vanessa Ovando	17 May 1990 (aged 20)	(National Football Federation of Guatemala) Comunicaciones
20	FW	Katherine Ramos	28 October 1991 (aged 19)	(National Football Federation of Guatemala) UNIFUT
22	GK	Ana Lucía Spross	15 May 1982 (aged 28)	(National Football Federation of Guatemala) Comunicaciones

=== Haiti ===
Head coach: (Brazil) Augusto Moura de Oliveira

No.	Pos.	Player	Date of birth (age)	Club
1	GK	Géralda Saintilus	10 December 1985 (aged 24)	(Haitian Football Federation) Aigle Brillent
2	DF	Natacha Cajuste	24 February 1984 (aged 26)	(Haitian Football Federation) AS Tigresses
3	DF	Frantzcia Francois	10 August 1988 (aged 22)	(Haitian Football Federation) Anacaona FC
4	DF	Kencia Marseille	8 November 1980 (aged 29)	(Haitian Football Federation) Aigle Brillent
5	DF	Marie Valcine	2 November 1986 (aged 23)	(Haitian Football Federation) Essentiel FC
6	DF	Fiorda Charles	21 February 1987 (aged 23)	(Haitian Football Federation) AS Tigresses
7	MF	Betty Sanon	4 June 1984 (aged 26)	(Haitian Football Federation) Valentina FC
8	MF	Felicia Libertin	27 March 1985 (aged 25)	(Haitian Football Federation) Valentina FC
9	FW	Adeline Saintilmond	25 December 1984 (aged 25)	(Haitian Football Federation) Valentina FC
10	MF	Wisline Dolce	22 November 1986 (aged 23)	(Haitian Football Federation) AS Tigresses
11	FW	Sophia Batard	8 March 1989 (aged 21)	(Haitian Football Federation) AS Tigresses
12	FW	Nuela Antenor	18 December 1984 (aged 25)	(Haitian Football Federation) Valentina FC
13	DF	Marie Jean-Pierre	14 January 1990 (aged 20)	Unattached
14	FW	Samantha Brand	16 June 1988 (aged 22)	(Football Association of Iceland) Afturelding
15	MF	Kimberly Boulos	16 April 1987 (aged 23)	(Swedish Football Association) QBIK
16	MF	Marie Nord	14 May 1978 (aged 32)	(Haitian Football Federation) Aigle Brillent
17	FW	Roselord Borgella	1 April 1993 (aged 17)	(Haitian Football Federation) Essentiel FC
18	FW	Kensie Bobo	15 October 1992 (aged 18)	(Haitian Football Federation) AS Tigresses
19	MF	Nadia Valentin	10 April 1987 (aged 23)	(Haitian Football Federation) Valentina FC
20	FW	Tatiana Mathelier	11 August 1983 (aged 27)	(United States Soccer Federation) Vandaval

=== United States ===
The squad was announced on 13 October 2010.

Head coach: (Sweden) Pia Sundhage

No.	Pos.	Player	Date of birth (age)	Club
1	GK	Jill Loyden	25 June 1985 (aged 25)	(United States Soccer Federation) Chicago Red Stars
2	DF	Heather Mitts	6 June 1987 (aged 23)	(United States Soccer Federation) Philadelphia Independence
3	DF	Christie Rampone	24 June 1975 (aged 35)	(United States Soccer Federation) Sky Blue FC
4	MF	Yael Averbuch	3 November 1986 (aged 23)	(United States Soccer Federation) Sky Blue FC
5	FW	Alex Morgan	2 July 1989 (aged 21)	Unattached
6	DF	Amy LePeilbet	12 March 1983 (aged 27)	(United States Soccer Federation) Boston Breakers
7	MF	Shannon Boxx	29 June 1977 (aged 33)	(United States Soccer Federation) FC Gold Pride
8	FW	Amy Rodriguez	17 February 1987 (aged 23)	(United States Soccer Federation) Boston Breakers
9	MF	Heather O'Reilly	2 January 1985 (aged 25)	(United States Soccer Federation) Sky Blue FC
10	MF	Carli Lloyd	16 July 1982 (aged 28)	(United States Soccer Federation) Sky Blue FC
11	MF	Lori Lindsey	19 March 1980 (aged 30)	(United States Soccer Federation) Philadelphia Independence
12	FW	Lauren Cheney	30 September 1987 (aged 23)	(United States Soccer Federation) Boston Breakers
13	MF	Kristine Lilly	22 July 1971 (aged 39)	(United States Soccer Federation) Boston Breakers
14	DF	Stephanie Cox	3 April 1986 (aged 24)	(United States Soccer Federation) Boston Breakers
15	MF	Megan Rapinoe	5 July 1985 (aged 25)	(United States Soccer Federation) Chicago Red Stars
16	DF	Ali Krieger	28 July 1984 (aged 26)	(German Football Association) 1. FFC Frankfurt
17	DF	Becky Sauerbrunn	6 June 1985 (aged 25)	(United States Soccer Federation) Washington Freedom
18	GK	Nicole Barnhart	10 October 1981 (aged 29)	(United States Soccer Federation) FC Gold Pride
19	DF	Rachel Buehler	26 August 1985 (aged 25)	(United States Soccer Federation) FC Gold Pride
20	FW	Abby Wambach	2 June 1980 (aged 30)	(United States Soccer Federation) Washington Freedom
