= Vanessa Ovando =

Guatemalan footballer

Personal information
- Full name: Vanessa Saraí Ovando Monroy
- Date of birth: 17 May 1990 (age 36)
- Position: Midfielder

Senior career*
Years	Team	Apps	(Gls)
2010	Comunicaciones		

International career^{‡}
2010	Guatemala U20	3	(0)
2010	Guatemala	3	(0)
- * Club domestic league appearances and goals ‡ National team caps and goals as of 1 November 2010

Vanessa Saraí Ovando Monroy (born 17 May 1990) is a Guatemalan retired footballer who played as a midfielder. She has been a member of the Guatemala women's national team.

== International career ==
Ovando represented Guatemala at the 2010 CONCACAF Women's U-20 Championship. At senior level, she capped during the 2010 CONCACAF Women's World Cup Qualifying (and its qualification).
