= Karen Landaverde =

Salvadoran footballer (born 1991)

Personal information
- Full name: Karen Elizabeth Landaverde Alfaro
- Date of birth: 16 December 1991 (age 34)
- Place of birth: San Salvador, El Salvador
- Height: 1.64 m (5 ft 5 in)
- Position: Midfielder

Team information
- Current team: NSB Burgos CF

Youth career
- Academia Chelona

Senior career*
Years	Team	Apps	(Gls)
2010–2014	San Salvador		
2015–2016	River Plate		
2017–2018	Alianza F.C.		
2018–2019	El Ejido	13	(15)
2019–2020	NSB Burgos CF		(3)

International career
2006–2008	El Salvador U17	8	(1)
2009	El Salvador U20	3	(2)
2010	El Salvador U21	2	(3)
2010–2015	El Salvador	9	(6)
- * Club domestic league appearances and goals as of 24 February 2019.

Karen Elizabeth Landaverde Alfaro (born 16 December 1991) is a Salvadoran footballer who plays as a midfielder for Spanish club NSB Burgos CF and El Salvador women's national team.

== International career ==
Landaverde has earned caps with the El Salvador under-17, under-20, under-21 and national women's teams.

== International goals ==
Scores and results list El Salvador's goal tally first.

No.	Date	Venue	Opponent	Score	Result	Competition
1	20 April 2010	Estadio Pensativo, Antigua Guatemala, Guatemala	Belize	3–0	9–0	2010 CONCACAF Women's World Cup Qualifying qualification
2	20 April 2010	Estadio Pensativo, Antigua Guatemala, Guatemala	Belize	5–0	9–0	2010 CONCACAF Women's World Cup Qualifying qualification
3	22 April 2010	Estadio Pensativo, Antigua Guatemala, Guatemala	Guatemala	1–1	1–2	2010 CONCACAF Women's World Cup Qualifying qualification

== See also ==
- List of El Salvador women's international footballers
