= Shondel Archer =

Guyanese footballer

Personal information
- Full name: Shondel Nichole Archer
- Date of birth: 9 December 1990 (age 35)
- Place of birth: United States
- Height: 1.63 m (5 ft 4 in)
- Positions: Forward; fullback

Youth career
- Woodbridge High School

College career
Years	Team	Apps	(Gls)
2009–2012	Richmond Spiders	60	(9)

Senior career*
Years	Team	Apps	(Gls)
- Northern Virginia Majestics

International career^{‡}
2010	Guyana	2	(0)
- * Club domestic league appearances and goals ‡ National team caps and goals as of 3 July 2010

Shondel Nichole Archer (born 9 December 1990) is a retired footballer who played as a forward. Born in the United States, she represents the Guyana women's national team at international level.

== Early life and amateur career ==
Archer was raised in Woodbridge, Virginia. She attended Woodbridge High School in Lake Ridge, Virginia. After graduating, Archer attended the University of Richmond.

== Club career ==
She played for the Northern Virginia Majestics.

== International career ==
Archer qualified to play for Guyana through her parents, who were both born in the country. She capped for the Lady Jags' at senior level during the 2010 CONCACAF Women's World Cup Qualifying qualification.

== Personal life ==
Her grandfather, Patrick Legall, is regarded as "one of [Guyana's] most famous cricket players and managers."

== See also ==
- List of Guyana women's international footballers
