= Gladys Suriano =

Guatemalan footballer

Personal information
- Full name: Gladys Jeannette Suriano Palacios
- Date of birth: 26 December 1985 (age 40)
- Position: Midfielder

Senior career*
Years	Team	Apps	(Gls)
2010	Champions		

International career^{‡}
2010–2011	Guatemala	13	(0)
- * Club domestic league appearances and goals ‡ National team caps and goals as of 24 January 2012

Gladys Jeannette Suriano Palacios (born 26 December 1985) is a Guatemalan retired footballer who played as a midfielder. She has been a member of the Guatemala women's national team.

== International career ==
Suriano capped for Guatemala at senior level during the 2010 CONCACAF Women's World Cup Qualifying (and its qualification), the 2010 Central American and Caribbean Games and the 2012 CONCACAF Women's Olympic Qualifying Tournament qualification. She was also called for the 2012 CONCACAF Women's Olympic Qualifying Tournament, but did not play.
