= Daniela Méndez =

Guatemalan footballer

Personal information
- Full name: Daniela Martin Méndez Vasconcelos
- Date of birth: 18 April 1991 (age 35)
- Position: Defender

Senior career*
Years	Team	Apps	(Gls)
2010	Pares		

International career^{‡}
2010–2011	Guatemala	10	(2)
- * Club domestic league appearances and goals ‡ National team caps and goals as of 8 October 2011

Daniela Martin Méndez Vasconcelos (born 18 April 1991) is a Guatemalan retired footballer who played as a defender. She has been a member of the Guatemala women's national team.

== International career ==
Méndez capped for Guatemala at senior level during the 2010 CONCACAF Women's World Cup Qualifying (and its qualification), the 2010 Central American and Caribbean Games and the 2012 CONCACAF Women's Olympic Qualifying Tournament qualification.
