= Rocío Hernández =

Puerto Rican footballer (born 1985)

Rocio Hernandez
Personal information
- Birth name: Rocío Hernández
- Date of birth: April 14, 1985 (age 41)
- Place of birth: Spain
- Height: 1.80 m (5 ft 11 in)
- Positions: Center forward; center midfielder; center back

Youth career
- Tres Cantos
- Hobbs High School
- Pearland High School

College career
Years	Team	Apps	(Gls)
2003	UTEP Miners		
2004–2006	Florida Tech Panthers	29+	(5+)

International career^{‡}
2010	Puerto Rico	9	(5)
- ‡ National team caps and goals as of 1 August 2010

Rocio “Ro” “Rorro” Hernandez (born April 14, 1985) is a Spanish-born Puerto Rican retired professional footballer and National Team Captain. She has been a member, as well as the Olympic team captain of the Puerto Rico women's national team.

== Early and personal life ==
Hernández was raised in Madrid. She was born to a Spanish father and a Puerto Rican mother.

== International goals ==
Scores and results list Puerto Rico's goal tally first.

No.	Date	Venue	Opponent	Score	Result	Competition
1	19 March 2010	Juan Ramón Loubriel Stadium, Bayamón, Puerto Rico	Saint Kitts and Nevis	5–0	7–0	2010 CONCACAF Women's World Cup Qualifying qualification
2	21 March 2010	Juan Ramón Loubriel Stadium, Bayamón, Puerto Rico	Dominica	2–0	6–0	2010 CONCACAF Women's World Cup Qualifying qualification
3	11 May 2010	Manny Ramjohn Stadium, Marabella, Trinidad and Tobago	Cuba	3–4	3–4	2010 CONCACAF Women's World Cup Qualifying qualification
4	26 July 2010	Estadio Metropolitano, Mérida, Venezuela	Guatemala	1–1	1–1	2010 Central American and Caribbean Games
5	30 July 2010	Estadio Metropolitano, Mérida, Venezuela	Nicaragua	3–1	3–1	2010 Central American and Caribbean Games
