= Nikkita Persaud =

Guyanese footballer (born 1990)

Personal information
- Date of birth: 8 April 1990 (age 36)
- Place of birth: Scarborough, Ontario, Canada
- Height: 1.63 m (5 ft 4 in)
- Positions: Forward; midfielder; defender

Youth career
- Malvern SC
- Richmond Hill SC
- Pickering SC

College career
Years	Team	Apps	(Gls)
2008–2009	The Citadel Bulldogs	35	(6)
2010–2012	Rhode Island Rams	37	(1)

Senior career*
Years	Team	Apps	(Gls)
2019	Durham United FA	0	(0)

International career^{‡}
2010–2018	Guyana	7+	(0+)
- * Club domestic league appearances and goals as of 30 October 2011 ‡ National team caps and goals as of 25 April 2018

Nikkita Persaud (born 8 April 1990) is a Canadian-born Guyanese footballer who plays as a defender. She has been a member and captain of the Guyana women's national team.

== International career ==
Persaud was the captain for Guyana at senior level during the 2018 CFU Women's Challenge Series.

== See also ==
- List of Guyana women's international footballers
