= Yezenia Gallardo =

Cuban footballer (born 1991)

Yesenia Gallardo
Personal information
- Full name: Yesenia Yamilet Gallardo Martínez
- Date of birth: 28 June 1991 (age 35)
- Position: Forward

Senior career*
Years	Team	Apps	(Gls)
2012	La Habana		

International career^{‡}
2009–2010	Cuba U20	7	(8)
2010–2012	Cuba	10	(12)
- * Club domestic league appearances and goals ‡ National team caps and goals as of 22 January 2012

Yesenia Yamilet Gallardo Martínez (born 28 June 1991), also known as Yezenia Gallardo, is a Cuban former footballer who played as a forward. She capped for the Cuba women's national team until January 2012, when she defected while being in Vancouver, Canada during an international competitive tournament.

== International career ==
Gallardo capped for Cuba at senior level during the 2010 CONCACAF Women's World Cup Qualifying qualification and the 2012 CONCACAF Women's Olympic Qualifying Tournament (and its qualification).

== International goals ==
List of international goals scored by Yezenia Gallardo
No.	Date	Venue	Opponent	Score	Result	Competition	Reference
1.	11 May 2010	Manny Ramjohn Stadium, Marabella, Trinidad and Tobago	Puerto Rico	1–0	4–3	2010 CONCACAF Women's World Cup Qualifying qualification	
2.	11 May 2010	Manny Ramjohn Stadium, Marabella, Trinidad and Tobago	Puerto Rico	4–0	4–3	2010 CONCACAF Women's World Cup Qualifying qualification	
3.	15 May 2010	Manny Ramjohn Stadium, Marabella, Trinidad and Tobago	Antigua and Barbuda	1–0	6–1	2010 CONCACAF Women's World Cup Qualifying qualification	
4.	15 May 2010	Manny Ramjohn Stadium, Marabella, Trinidad and Tobago	Antigua and Barbuda	2–0	6–1	2010 CONCACAF Women's World Cup Qualifying qualification	
5.	15 May 2010	Manny Ramjohn Stadium, Marabella, Trinidad and Tobago	Antigua and Barbuda	5–0	6–1	2010 CONCACAF Women's World Cup Qualifying qualification	
6.	26 June 2010	Estadio Pedro Marrero, Havana, Cuba	Guyana	1–0	1–0	2010 CONCACAF Women's World Cup Qualifying qualification	
7.	3 July 2010	Providence Stadium, Georgetown, Guyana	Guyana	1–0	1–3	2010 CONCACAF Women's World Cup Qualifying qualification	
8.	29 June 2011	Guillermo Prospero Trinidad Stadion, Oranjestad, Aruba	Aruba	1–0	6–0	2012 CONCACAF Women's Olympic Qualifying Tournament qualification	
9.	29 June 2011	Guillermo Prospero Trinidad Stadion, Oranjestad, Aruba	Aruba	3–0	6–0	2012 CONCACAF Women's Olympic Qualifying Tournament qualification	
10.	29 June 2011	Guillermo Prospero Trinidad Stadion, Oranjestad, Aruba	Aruba	4–0	6–0	2012 CONCACAF Women's Olympic Qualifying Tournament qualification	
11.	29 June 2011	Guillermo Prospero Trinidad Stadion, Oranjestad, Aruba	Aruba	5–0	6–0	2012 CONCACAF Women's Olympic Qualifying Tournament qualification	
12.	1 July 2011	Guillermo Prospero Trinidad Stadion, Oranjestad, Aruba	Haiti	1–1	1–1	2012 CONCACAF Women's Olympic Qualifying Tournament qualification	
