= Maricruz Lemus =

Guatemalan footballer

Personal information
- Full name: Maricruz Lemus Meléndez
- Date of birth: 12 August 1992 (age 34)
- Position: Goalkeeper

Senior career*
Years	Team	Apps	(Gls)
2010	Jutiapa		

International career^{‡}
2010–2013	Guatemala	11	(0)
- * Club domestic league appearances and goals ‡ National team caps and goals as of 15 March 2013

Maricruz Lemus Meléndez (born 12 August 1992) is a Guatemalan retired footballer who played as a goalkeeper. She has been a member of the Guatemala women's national team.

== International career ==
Lemus capped for Guatemala at senior level during the 2010 CONCACAF Women's World Cup Qualifying qualification, the 2012 CONCACAF Women's Olympic Qualifying Tournament (and its qualification) and the 2013 Central American Games.
