= Kimberly de León =

Guatemalan footballer

Personal information
- Full name: Kimberly Carolina de León Girón
- Date of birth: 29 August 1989 (age 37)
- Position: Defender

Senior career*
Years	Team	Apps	(Gls)
2010	Bárcenas		

International career^{‡}
2010–	Guatemala	20	(3)
- * Club domestic league appearances and goals ‡ National team caps and goals as of 15 June 2021

Kimberly Carolina de León Girón (born 29 August 1989) is a Guatemalan footballer who plays as a defender for the Guatemala women's national team.

== International career ==
De León capped for Guatemala at senior level during two CONCACAF Women's Championship editions (2010 and 2014), the 2010 Central American and Caribbean Games, the 2012 CONCACAF Women's Olympic Qualifying Tournament (and its qualification) and the 2013 Central American Games.
