= Rocío Sosa =

Guatemalan footballer

Personal information
- Full name: Rocío Adelita Sosa Gudiel
- Date of birth: 24 August 1990 (age 36)
- Position: Midfielder

Senior career*
Years	Team	Apps	(Gls)
2010	Comunicaciones		

International career^{‡}
2010	Guatemala U20	2	(0)
2010–2011	Guatemala	14	(2)
- * Club domestic league appearances and goals ‡ National team caps and goals as of 24 January 2012

Rocío Adelita Sosa Gudiel (born 24 August 1990) is a Guatemalan retired footballer who played as a midfielder. She has been a member of the Guatemala women's national team.

== International career ==
Sosa capped for Guatemala at senior level during the 2010 Central American and Caribbean Games, the 2010 CONCACAF Women's World Cup Qualifying and the 2012 CONCACAF Women's Olympic Qualifying Tournament (and its qualification).
