= Katherine Ramos =

Guatemalan footballer

Personal information
- Full name: Katherine Smiley Ramos Carpio
- Date of birth: 28 October 1991 (age 35)
- Position: Forward

Senior career*
Years	Team	Apps	(Gls)
2010	Unifut		

International career^{‡}
2010	Guatemala U20	3	(0)
2010–2013	Guatemala	18	(3)
- * Club domestic league appearances and goals ‡ National team caps and goals as of 15 March 2013

Katherine Smiley Ramos Carpio (born 28 October 1991) is a Guatemalan retired footballer who played as a forward. She has been a member of the Guatemala women's national team.

== International career ==
Ramos represented Guatemala at the 2010 CONCACAF Women's U-20 Championship. At senior level, she capped during the 2010 CONCACAF Women's World Cup Qualifying (and its qualification), the 2010 Central American and Caribbean Games, the 2012 CONCACAF Women's Olympic Qualifying Tournament (and its qualification) and the 2013 Central American Games.
