= 2010 CONCACAF Women's World Cup Qualifying qualification =

This page provides the summaries of the matches of the qualifying rounds for the group stage of the 2010 CONCACAF Women's World Cup Qualifying tournament. These matches also served as part of the qualifiers for the 2011 FIFA Women's World Cup that was held in Germany.

A total of 23 national teams entered qualification – 6 in the Central American (UNCAF) region and 17 in the Caribbean (CFU) region. Two Central American and three Caribbean sides advanced to the 2010 CONCACAF Women's Championship, joining three pre-qualified teams of North American region.

== Central America ==
The winner of each group advanced to the 2010 CONCACAF Women's World Cup Qualifying tournament in late 2010.

=== Triangular A ===
All matches played in Antigua Guatemala, Guatemala.

Team	Pld	W	D	L	GF	GA	GD	Pts
Guatemala	2	2	0	0	7	2	+5	6
El Salvador	2	1	0	1	10	2	+8	3
Belize	2	0	0	2	1	14	−13	0

20 April 2010
15:00 UTC-6

El Salvador	9–0	Belize
Merino 9'; Campos 15', 29'; Landaverde 17', 68'; Ramos 69', 86', 87', 90'	Report

Estadio Pensativo, Antigua Guatemala
Attendance: 102
Referee: Erika Vargas (Costa Rica)

22 April 2010
15:00 UTC-6

Guatemala	2–1	El Salvador
Ramos 12'; Cayetano 55'	Report	Landaverde 35'

Estadio Pensativo, Antigua Guatemala
Attendance: 565
Referee: Quetzalli Alvarado (Mexico)

24 April 2010
15:00 UTC-6

Guatemala	5–1	Belize
Tobar 45'; Ramos 48'; Cayetano 61', 72'; Lohaiza 70'	Report	Hernandez 55'

Estadio Pensativo, Antigua Guatemala
Attendance: 1,200
Referee: Arlene Troya (Panama)

=== Triangular B ===
All matches played in Managua, Nicaragua.

Team	Pld	W	D	L	GF	GA	GD	Pts
Costa Rica	2	2	0	0	4	0	+4	6
Nicaragua	2	1	0	1	2	3	−1	3
Honduras	2	0	0	2	1	4	−3	0

26 April 2010
15:00 UTC-6

Nicaragua	2–1	Honduras
Lovo 31'; Acevedo 86'	Report	Turcios 9'

Estadio Nacional de la UNAN-Managua, Managua
Attendance: 325
Referee: Yesli Rivas (El Salvador)

28 April 2010
15:00 UTC-6

Honduras	0–2	Costa Rica
	Report	C. Venegas 39'; F. Sánchez 81'

Estadio Nacional de la UNAN-Managua, Managua
Attendance: 60
Referee: Maria Ortego (El Salvador)

30 April 2010
15:00 UTC-6

Nicaragua	0–2	Costa Rica
	Report	R. Rodríguez 24'; C. Venegas 37'

Estadio Nacional de la UNAN-Managua, Managua
Attendance: 550
Referee: Irazema Aguilera (Cuba)

== Caribbean ==
=== First round ===
Cuba and Trinidad and Tobago received byes to the second round.

The winner of each group advanced, along with the best of the five runners-up.

==== Group A ====
All matches played in Georgetown, Guyana.

Team	Pld	W	D	L	GF	GA	GD	Pts
Guyana	2	2	0	0	3	0	+3	6
Suriname	2	1	0	1	1	2	−1	3
Saint Vincent and the Grenadines	2	0	0	2	0	2	−2	0

3 March 2010
15:30 UTC-4

Suriname	1–0	Saint Vincent and the Grenadines
Smit 65' (pen.)	Report

Georgetown Cricket Club Ground, Georgetown
Attendance: 2,000
Referee: Nicole Joseph (Guyana)

5 March 2010
15:30 UTC-4

Guyana	2–0	Suriname
B. Persaud 19'; Heydorn 47'	Report

Georgetown Cricket Club Ground, Georgetown
Attendance: 3,000
Referee: Gillian Martindale (Barbados)

7 March 2010
15:30 UTC-4

Guyana	1–0	Saint Vincent and the Grenadines
Heydorn 60'	Report

Georgetown Cricket Club Ground, Georgetown
Attendance: 3,000
Referee: Gillian Martindale (Barbados)

==== Group B ====
All matches played in Bayamón, Puerto Rico.

Team	Pld	W	D	L	GF	GA	GD	Pts
Puerto Rico	2	2	0	0	13	0	+13	6
Saint Kitts and Nevis	2	1	0	1	2	7	−5	3
Dominica	2	0	0	2	0	8	−8	0

17 March 2010
20:00 UTC-4

Saint Kitts and Nevis	2–0	Dominica
Arthurton 84'; Powell 89'	Report

Juan Ramón Loubriel Stadium, Bayamón
Attendance: 150
Referee: Gillian Martindale (Barbados)

19 March 2010
20:00 UTC-4

Puerto Rico	7–0	Saint Kitts and Nevis
Tirelli 5'; Negrón 6', 53', 84'; Rodríguez 25'; Reyes 31'; Hernández 44'	Report

Juan Ramón Loubriel Stadium, Bayamón
Attendance: 350
Referee: Gillian Martindale (Barbados)

21 March 2010
17:00 UTC-4

Puerto Rico	6–0	Dominica
Cardona 31', 83'; Hernández 62'; Tousett 67', 89'; Félix 70'	Report

Juan Ramón Loubriel Stadium, Bayamón
Attendance: 500
Referee: Gillian Martindale (Barbados)

==== Group C ====
All matches played in St. John's, Antigua and Barbuda.

Team	Pld	W	D	L	GF	GA	GD	Pts
Saint Lucia	2	2	0	0	9	1	+8	6
Antigua and Barbuda	2	1	0	1	4	3	+1	3
U.S. Virgin Islands	2	0	0	2	1	10	−9	0

10 March 2010
16:15 UTC-4

Antigua and Barbuda	1–2	Saint Lucia
London 2'	Report	Marquis 40'; Jean 44'

Antigua Recreation Ground, St. John's
Attendance: 200
Referee: Nicole Joseph (Guyana)

12 March 2010
16:15 UTC-4

U.S. Virgin Islands	0–7	Saint Lucia
	Report	Alphonse 8'; Jean 27', 33', 60'; Frederick 47', 61'; Celestin 85'

Antigua Recreation Ground, St. John's
Attendance: 50
Referee: Bryan Willett (Antigua and Barbuda)

14 March 2010
16:15 UTC-4

Antigua and Barbuda	3–1	U.S. Virgin Islands
Lewis 52'; Simon 58'; H. Thomas 90'	Report	Taylor 90'

Antigua Recreation Ground, St. John's
Attendance: 200
Referee: Nicole Joseph (Guyana)

==== Group D ====
All matches played in Santo Domingo, Dominican Republic.

Team	Pld	W	D	L	GF	GA	GD	Pts
Haiti	2	2	0	0	7	1	+6	6
Dominican Republic	2	1	0	1	4	3	+1	3
Turks and Caicos Islands	2	0	0	2	1	8	−7	0

26 March 2010
18:00 UTC-4

Dominican Republic	3–1	Turks and Caicos Islands
Ubrí 29', 55'; Frías 75'	Report	Barnett 1'

Estadio Panamericano San Cristóbal, Santo Domingo
Attendance: 650
Referee: Cardella Samuels (Jamaica)

28 March 2010
18:00 UTC-4

Turks and Caicos Islands	0–5	Haiti
	Report	Dolce 2'; Saintilmond 25'; Batard 45'; Hilaire 71', 78'

Estadio Panamericano San Cristóbal, Santo Domingo
Attendance: 250
Referee: Cardella Samuels (Jamaica)

30 March 2010
18:00 UTC-4

Dominican Republic	1–2	Haiti
Díaz 42' (pen.)	Report	Saintilmond 28'; Dolce 84'

Estadio Panamericano San Cristóbal, Santo Domingo
Attendance: 800
Referee: Cardella Samuels (Jamaica)

==== Group E ====
All matches played in Bridgetown, Barbados.

Team	Pld	W	D	L	GF	GA	GD	Pts
Barbados	2	2	0	0	7	0	+7	6
Anguilla	2	1	0	1	2	3	−1	3
Grenada	2	0	0	2	0	6	−6	0

28 March 2010
17:00 UTC-4

Barbados	3–0	Anguilla
Hackette 17', 60', 83'	Report

Barbados National Stadium, Bridgetown
Attendance: 450
Referee: Shane De Silva (Trinidad and Tobago)

30 March 2010
17:00 UTC-4

Anguilla	2–0	Grenada
Anderson 9'; C. Richardson 12'	Report

Barbados National Stadium, Bridgetown
Attendance: 100
Referee: Shane De Silva (Trinidad and Tobago)

1 April 2010
17:00 UTC-4

Barbados	4–0	Grenada
Brathwaite 9'; Hackette 46', 87' (pen.); Thompson 83'	Report

Barbados National Stadium, Bridgetown
Attendance: 500
Referee: Shane De Silva (Trinidad and Tobago)

==== Ranking of group runners-up ====
Top team advanced to the second round.

Gp	Team	Pld	W	D	L	GF	GA	GD	Pts
C	Antigua and Barbuda	2	1	0	1	4	3	+1	3
D	Dominican Republic	2	1	0	1	4	3	+1	3
E	Anguilla	2	1	0	1	2	3	−1	3
A	Suriname	2	1	0	1	1	2	−1	3
B	Saint Kitts and Nevis	2	1	0	1	2	7	−5	3

Antigua and Barbuda and the Dominican Republic finished equal as best runners-up. Antigua and Barbuda won the draw taken to break the tie.

=== Second round ===
The winner of each group advanced to the 2010 CONCACAF Women's World Cup Qualifying final tournament in late 2010. The runners-up advanced to a play-off.

==== Group F ====
All matches played in Macoya, Trinidad and Tobago.

Team	Pld	W	D	L	GF	GA	GD	Pts
Trinidad and Tobago	3	3	0	0	14	1	+13	9
Guyana	3	2	0	1	11	3	+8	6
Barbados	3	1	0	2	4	11	−7	3
Saint Lucia	3	0	0	3	4	18	−14	0

10 May 2010
17:00 UTC-4

Guyana	3–0	Barbados
El-Masri 9'; A. Rodrigues 37'; Savona 55'	Report

Marvin Lee Stadium, Macoya
Attendance: 150
Referee: Sabina Charles-Kirton (Saint Lucia)
10 May 2010
19:00 UTC-4

Trinidad and Tobago	6–1	Saint Lucia
Edwards 11', 23'; Cordner 19', 52'; Mollon 56'; Shade 87'	Report	Alphonse 60'

Marvin Lee Stadium, Macoya
Attendance: 150
Referee: Cardella Samuels (Jamaica)

12 May 2010
17:00 UTC-4

Saint Lucia	0–8	Guyana
	Report	El-Masri 9'; A. Rodrigues 11', 54'; Heydorn 15', 58', 64'; Owen 47'; J. Rodrigues 63'

Marvin Lee Stadium, Macoya
Attendance: 200
Referee: Shane De Silva (Trinidad and Tobago)
12 May 2010
19:00 UTC-4

Trinidad and Tobago	5–0	Barbados
King 5', 11', 48'; Herbert 72' (o.g.); Cordner 90'	Report

Marvin Lee Stadium, Macoya
Attendance: 200
Referee: Cardella Samuels (Jamaica)

14 May 2010
16:00 UTC-4

Barbados	4–3	Saint Lucia
Stevenson 19'; Brathwaite 35', 50', 55'	Report	Henry 71', 86'; Marquis 78'

Marvin Lee Stadium, Macoya
Attendance: 300
Referee: Shane De Silva (Trinidad and Tobago)
14 May 2010
18:00 UTC-4

Trinidad and Tobago	3–0	Guyana
Cordner 15', 65'; Matthias 34'	Report

Marvin Lee Stadium, Macoya
Attendance: 300
Referee: Sabina Charles-Kirton (Saint Lucia)

==== Group G ====
All matches played in Marabella, Trinidad and Tobago.

Team	Pld	W	D	L	GF	GA	GD	Pts
Haiti	3	3	0	0	9	1	+8	9
Cuba	3	2	0	1	10	7	+3	6
Puerto Rico	3	1	0	2	11	6	+5	3
Antigua and Barbuda	3	0	0	3	2	18	−16	0

11 May 2010
17:00 UTC-4

Cuba	4–3	Puerto Rico
Gallardo 37', 67'; Fuentes 50'; Cruz 56'	Report	Tirelli 72', 75'; Hernández 85'

Manny Ramjohn Stadium, Marabella
Attendance: 100
Referee: Nicole Joseph (Guyana)
11 May 2010
19:00 UTC-4

Antigua and Barbuda	1–4	Haiti
London 36'	Report	Pierre Louis 19'; Batard 42'; Aristilde 43'; Mathelier 49'

Manny Ramjohn Stadium, Marabella
Attendance: 100
Referee: Gillian Martindale (Barbados)

13 May 2010
17:00 UTC-4

Haiti	3–0	Cuba
Charles 52'; Boulos 75'; Brand 86'	Report

Manny Ramjohn Stadium, Marabella
Attendance: 25
Referee: Gillian Martindale (Barbados)
13 May 2010
19:00 UTC-4

Puerto Rico	8–0	Antigua and Barbuda
Félix 4', 16'; Negrón 18', 72'; Soltero 35'; C. Reyes 39'; Taboas 84'; Guerra 90'	Report

Manny Ramjohn Stadium, Marabella
Attendance: 25
Referee: Asha Lester (Trinidad and Tobago)

15 May 2010
16:00 UTC-4

Haiti	2–0	Puerto Rico
Saintilmond 16'; Pierre Louis 87'	Report

Manny Ramjohn Stadium, Marabella
Attendance: 100
Referee: Asha Lester (Trinidad and Tobago)
15 May 2010
18:00 UTC-4

Cuba	6–1	Antigua and Barbuda
Gallardo 8', 11', 64'; Calderón 35'; Peláez 50'; Pérez 75'	Report	Kai Jacobs 82'

Manny Ramjohn Stadium, Marabella
Attendance: 100
Referee: Asha Lester (Trinidad and Tobago)

=== Caribbean play-off ===
The winner of the play-off advanced to the 2010 CONCACAF Women's World Cup Qualifying final tournament in late 2010.

Team 1	Agg.	Team 2	1st leg	2nd leg
Cuba	2–3	Guyana	1–0	1–3

26 June 2010
16:30 UTC-4

Cuba	1–0	Guyana
Gallardo 21'	Report

Estadio Pedro Marrero, Havana
Attendance: 60
Referee: Shane De Silva (Trinidad and Tobago)

3 July 2010
15:30 UTC-4

Guyana	3–1	Cuba
A. Rodrigues 37' (pen.); B. Persaud 44'; J. Rodrigues 48'	Report	Gallardo 35'

Providence Stadium, Georgetown
Referee: Shane De Silva (Trinidad and Tobago)

Guyana won 3 – 2 on aggregate and advanced to the 2010 CONCACAF Women's World Cup Qualifying final tournament
