= Justine Rodrigues =

Canadian-Guyanese footballer (born 1993)

Personal information
- Date of birth: 17 March 1993 (age 33)
- Place of birth: Georgetown, Ontario, Canada
- Height: 1.70 m (5 ft 7 in)
- Position: Midfielder

Team information
- Current team: Guelph Union

Youth career
- Brampton Brams United

College career
Years	Team	Apps	(Gls)
2011–2014	Gannon Golden Knights	74	(20)

Senior career*
Years	Team	Apps	(Gls)
2018–2019	Oakville Blue Devils	11	(2)
2021	Vaughan Azzurri	4	(0)
2022–	Guelph Union	30	(3)

International career^{‡}
2011–2012	Guyana U20	5	(1)
2010–	Guyana	24	(3)
- * Club domestic league appearances and goals as of July 22, 2023 ‡ National team caps and goals as of 10 September 2024

Justine Rodrigues (born 17 March 1993) is a footballer who plays as a midfielder for Guelph Union in League1 Ontario. Born in Canada, she represents the Guyana women's national team.

== Early life ==
Rodrigues played youth soccer with Brampton Brams United.

== College career ==
Rodrigues attended Gannon University, playing for the women's soccer team from 2011 to 2014. In 2011, as a freshman, she earned Daktronics All-Atlantic Region second team and National Soccer Coaches Association of America (NSCAA) All-Atlantic Region third-team honours. In 2013, she earned All-PSAC Third Team honours. In 2014, she earned All-PSAC Second Team, NSCAA Third Team, and First Team All-ECAC honours. Over her time at Gannon, she scored 20 goals and recorded nine assists, with eight game-winning goals over 74 appearances.

== Playing career ==
In 2018 and 2019, she played for the Oakville Blue Devils in League1 Ontario.

In 2021, she played for Vaughan Azzurri.

In 2022 and 2023, she played for Guelph Union.

== International career ==
She made her debut for the Guyana national team at age 16. She has also represented the Guyana U20 team.

In 2020, she served as the athletic trainer for Guyana at the U20 Olympic soccer qualifiers held in the Dominican Republic.

== International goals ==
Scores and results list Guyana's goal tally first

No.	Date	Venue	Opponent	Score	Result	Competition
1	12 May 2010	Marvin Lee Stadium, Macoya, Trinidad and Tobago	Saint Lucia	7–0	8–0	2010 CONCACAF Women's World Cup Qualifying qualification
2	3 July 2010	Providence Stadium, Georgetown, Guyana	Cuba	3–1	3–1	2010 CONCACAF Women's World Cup Qualifying qualification

== Personal life ==
She is the cousin of fellow Guyana national team player Ashley Rodrigues.

== See also ==
- List of Guyana women's international footballers
