= Andrea Tobar =

Guatemalan footballer

Personal information
- Full name: Andrea María Tobar Quan
- Date of birth: 8 July 1988 (age 38)
- Place of birth: San Juan Comalapa, Guatemala
- Position: Midfielder

Senior career*
Years	Team	Apps	(Gls)
2012	Chinautla		

International career^{‡}
2010–2012	Guatemala	4	(0)
- * Club domestic league appearances and goals ‡ National team caps and goals as of 24 January 2012

Andrea María Tobar Quan (born 8 July 1988) is a Guatemalan retired footballer who played as a midfielder. She has been a member of the Guatemala women's national team. She was the first Guatemalan female player to play in South America in Brazil for the Universidad do Parana in the year 2007.

Starting as a football player, she transitioned to indoor soccer in the year 2010. That same year she competed with the national team in the first invitational female indoor soccer world cup that was celebrated in Spain in December of that same year.

== International career ==
Tobar capped for Guatemala at the senior level during the 2010 CONCACAF Women's World Cup Qualifying qualification and the 2012 CONCACAF Women's Olympic Qualifying Tournament (and its qualification)
