= Daria Owen =

Guyanese footballer (born 1988)

Personal information
- Full name: Daria Niya Owen
- Date of birth: 4 April 1988 (age 38)
- Place of birth: Snellville, Georgia, United States
- Height: 1.70 m (5 ft 7 in)
- Positions: Midfielder; centre back

College career
Years	Team	Apps	(Gls)
2006–2008	Georgia College Bobcats	53	(4)

International career^{‡}
2010	Guyana	5	(1)
- ‡ National team caps and goals as of 3 July 2010

Daria Niya Owen (born 4 April 1988) is an American-born Guyanese retired footballer who played as a midfielder and a centre back. She has been a member of the Guyana women's national team.

== Early life ==
Owen was raised in Snellville, Georgia.

== High school and college career ==
Owen attended the Shiloh High School in her hometown. After graduating there, she joined the Georgia College & State University in Milledgeville, Georgia.

== International career ==
Owen qualified to play for Guyana through her father and her paternal grandparents. She capped for the Lady Jags at senior level during the 2010 CONCACAF Women's World Cup Qualifying qualification.

=== International goals ===
Scores and results list Guyana's goal tally first

No.	Date	Venue	Opponent	Score	Result	Competition
1	12 May 2010	Marvin Lee Stadium, Macoya, Trinidad and Tobago	Saint Lucia	4–0	8–0	2010 CONCACAF Women's World Cup Qualifying qualification

== See also ==
- List of Guyana women's international footballers
