= Rosa Merino =

Rosa Merino may refer to:

- Rosa Merino (footballer)
- Rosa Merino (singer)
