= Candace Edwards =

Tobagonian footballer

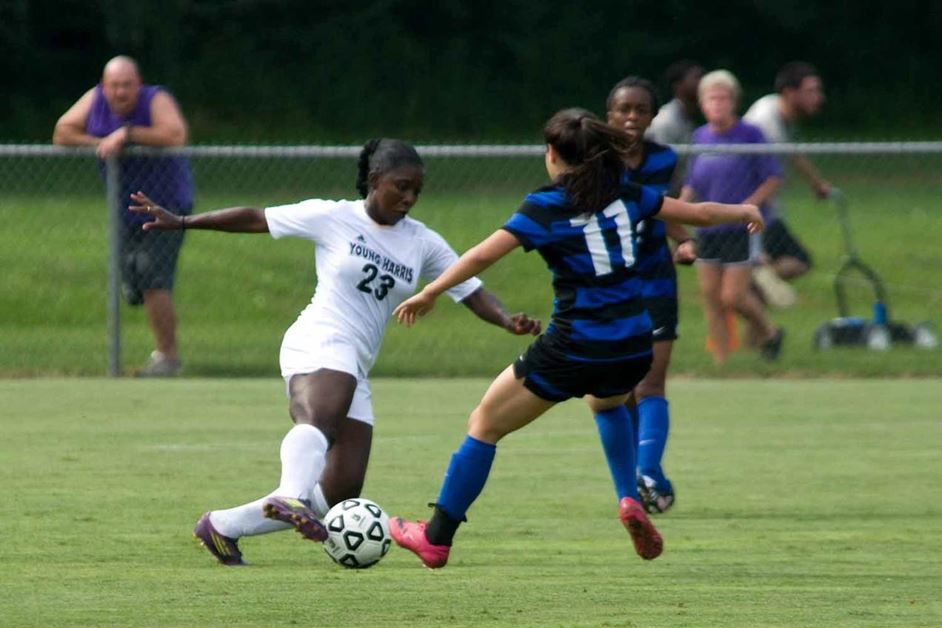

Personal information
- Full name: Candace Migail Edwards
- Date of birth: 16 November 1988 (age 37)
- Place of birth: Trinidad and Tobago
- Height: 1.60 m (5 ft 3 in)
- Positions: Midfielder; forward

College career
| Years | Team | Apps | (Gls) |
| 2007–2008 | Young Harris Mountain Lions | 34 | (39) |
| 2009 | Shorter Hawks | ? | (16) |
| 2013 | Young Harris Mountain Lions | 17 | (7) |

Senior career*
| Years | Team | Apps | (Gls) |
| 2010 | Tobago FC | | |

International career^{‡}
| 2010–2014 | Trinidad and Tobago | 19 | (4) |
- * Club domestic league appearances and goals as of 2 November 2013. ‡ National team caps and goals as of 21 November 2014.

Candace Migail Edwards (born 16 November 1988) is a Tobagonian footballer who played as a midfielder and a forward. She has been a member of the Trinidad and Tobago women's national team, and is record holding, two-time All-American collegiate player.

== Early life ==
Edwards was raised in Mount Saint George, a suburb in Scarborough, Tobago.

== College career ==
Edwards has attended the Young Harris College and the Shorter University in the United States.

== Club career ==
Edwards has played for Tobago FC in Trinidad and Tobago.

== International career ==
Edwards capped for Trinidad and Tobago at senior level during the 2010 Central American and Caribbean Games, the 2010 CONCACAF Women's World Cup Qualifying, the 2011 Pan American Games, the 2012 CONCACAF Women's Olympic Qualifying Tournament qualification and the 2014 Central American and Caribbean Games.

=== International goals ===
Scores and results list Trinidad and Tobago' goal tally first.

| No. | Date | Venue | Opponent | Score | Result | Competition | Ref. |
|---|---|---|---|---|---|---|---|
| 1 | 10 May 2010 | Marvin Lee Stadium, Tunapuna, Trinidad and Tobago | Saint Lucia | 1–0 | 6–1 | 2010 CONCACAF Women's World Cup Qualifying qualification | |
| 2 | 10 May 2010 | Marvin Lee Stadium, Tunapuna, Trinidad and Tobago | Saint Lucia | 3–0 | 6–1 | 2010 CONCACAF Women's World Cup Qualifying qualification | |
| 3 | 2 November 2010 | Estadio Beto Ávila, Cancún, México | Guyana | 3–0 | 4–1 | 2010 CONCACAF Women's World Cup Qualifying | |
| 4 | 5 July 2011 | Estadio Panamericano, San Cristóbal, Dominican Republic | Barbados | 3–1 | 5–1 | 2012 CONCACAF Women's Olympic Qualifying Tournament qualification | |

== Subsequent activities ==
Candace Edwards formed a band, "THE PACES", in 2018 with her husband Eric Pace. They have released two albums: "Parfait" in 2019 and "S.P.T" in 2020. In 2021 the duo was featured on Radiolab's "The Vanishing of Harry Pace" podcast episode 3. Edwards husband Eric is the Great-Grandson of musical pioneer Harry Pace.
