= John Boulos =

Haitian soccer player (1921–2002)

Personal information
- Date of birth: June 7, 1921
- Place of birth: Port-au-Prince, Haiti
- Date of death: January 16, 2002 (aged 80)
- Place of death: Brooklyn, New York, United States
- Position: Forward

Senior career*
Years	Team	Apps	(Gls)
?	Segura		
1940–1949	Brooklyn Hispano	29~	(30)
1949–1953	New York Hakoah		
1953–	Lithuania Sport		
- * Club domestic league appearances and goals

John "Frenchy" Boulos (June 7, 1921 – January 16, 2002) was a Haitian soccer player, who spent most of his career in the American Soccer League and German-American Soccer League. He is a member of the National Soccer Hall of Fame. Boulos is the grandfather of women's soccer player Kimberly Boulos.

== Early years ==
Boulos was born in Port-au-Prince, Haiti to a family of Lebanese descent. He attended school at Saint-Louis de Gonzague in Haiti before migrating to the United States in 1930 at age nine, where his family settled in Brooklyn, New York. He attended the Manual Training School where he won the New York City Championship and led the league in scoring, as well as being selected as league MVP. In addition to his school team, Boulos also played for the Bay Ridge Hearts junior team.

== Club career ==
At some point, Boulos played for Sequra in the Metropolitan League and then for Brooklyn Hispano in the American Soccer League. During World War II, he joined the U.S. Army Air Forces and was stationed in India. When he returned from the war, Boulos rejoined Hispano, playing with them until 1949. That year, he moved to New York Hakoah. In 1953, he moved to Lithuanian Sport in the German-American Soccer League, winning the GASL and New York State Cup titles in 1954.

== Honors ==
=== Individual ===
- United States National Soccer Hall of Fame: 1980
