= Alicia Tirelli =

American-Puerto Rican footballer

Personal information
- Full name: Alicia Marie Tirelli Walter
- Date of birth: 1 December 1985 (age 40)
- Place of birth: United States
- Height: 1.70 m (5 ft 7 in)
- Position: Forward

Youth career
- 1998–2001: Black Watch Stirling
- 2000–2001: Tampa Preparatory School
- 2002: Temple Terrace Spirit
- 2002–2003: Durant High School
- 2003: Hillsborough County United

College career
Years	Team	Apps	(Gls)
2004–2007	Florida Atlantic Owls	77	(27)

Senior career*
Years	Team	Apps	(Gls)
2013	North Jersey Valkyries		

International career^{‡}
2010	Puerto Rico	4	(3)
- * Club domestic league appearances and goals ‡ National team caps and goals as of 13 May 2010

Alicia Marie Tirelli Walter (born 1 December 1985) is an American-born Puerto Rican retired footballer who has played as a forward. She has been a member of the Puerto Rico women's national team.

== Early life ==
Tirelli was raised in Brandon, Florida. She was born to American parents. Her father is of Italian and Puerto Rican descent. Tirelli attended Durant High School in Florida, where she was named the Hillsborough County girls soccer player of the year by the Tampa Bay Times.

== International career ==
Tirelli was eligible to play for Puerto Rico through her paternal grandmother, who was born in Río Grande. She capped for Las Boricuas at senior level during the 2010 CONCACAF Women's World Cup Qualifying qualification.

=== International goals ===
Scores and results list Puerto Rico's goal tally first.

No.	Date	Venue	Opponent	Score	Result	Competition
1	19 April 2010	Juan Ramón Loubriel Stadium, Bayamón, Puerto Rico	Saint Kitts and Nevis	1–0	7–0	2010 CONCACAF Women's World Cup Qualifying qualification
2	11 May 2010	Manny Ramjohn Stadium, Marabella, Trinidad and Tobago	Cuba	1–4	3–4	2010 CONCACAF Women's World Cup Qualifying qualification
3	11 May 2010	Manny Ramjohn Stadium, Marabella, Trinidad and Tobago	Cuba	2–4	3–4	2010 CONCACAF Women's World Cup Qualifying qualification
