= Georgia College Bobcats =

- University: Georgia College & State University
- Conference: Peach Belt (primary)
- NCAA: Division II
- Athletic director: Wendell Staton
- Location: Milledgeville, Georgia
- First season: 1968
- Varsity teams: 11 (5 men's, 6 women's)
- Basketball arena: Centennial Center
- Baseball stadium: John Kurtz Field
- Softball stadium: Peeler Athletic Complex
- Soccer stadium: Bobcat Field
- Tennis venue: Centennial Center Tennis Facility
- Mascot: Thunder the Bobcat
- Nickname: Bobcats
- Colors: Blue and Green
- Website: gcsubobcats.com
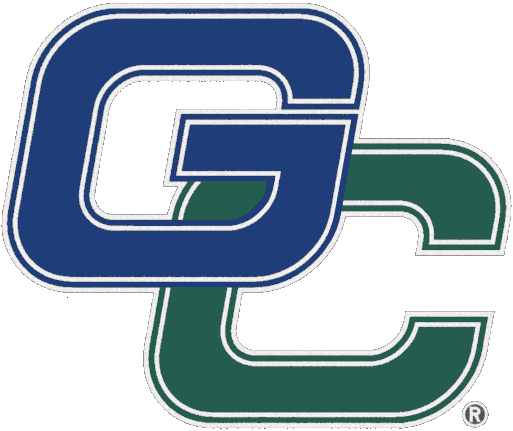

The Georgia College Bobcats are the athletic teams that represent Georgia College & State University, located in Milledgeville, Georgia, in intercollegiate sports at the Division II level of the National Collegiate Athletic Association (NCAA), primarily competing in the Peach Belt Conference since the 1990–91 academic year.

Georgia College competes in eleven intercollegiate varsity sports. Men's sports include baseball, basketball, cross country, golf, and tennis; while women's sports include basketball, cross country, soccer, softball, tennis, and volleyball.

== History ==
Georgia College's athletic programs were originally known as the Colonials until the present nickname of Bobcats was adopted in 1998, alongside a new mascot, known as Thunder.

== Conference affiliations ==
NCAA

- Peach Belt Conference (1990–present)

== Varsity teams ==
Men's sports	Women's sports
Baseball	Basketball
Basketball	Cross country
Cross country	Soccer
Golf	Softball
Tennis	Tennis
	Volleyball

== Notable alumni ==
=== Men's basketball ===
- Earl Grant

=== Women's soccer ===
- Daria Owen
