= Alexa Cardona =

Puerto Rican footballer

Personal information
- Full name: Alexandra Nicole Cardona Rodríguez
- Date of birth: 12 January 1989 (age 37)
- Place of birth: Atlanta, Georgia, United States
- Height: 1.65 m (5 ft 5 in)
- Position: Forward

Youth career
- Pius X High School

College career
Years	Team	Apps	(Gls)
2007–2010	Nebraska Cornhuskers	50	(3)

International career^{‡}
2010	Puerto Rico	9	(2)
- ‡ National team caps and goals as of 1 August 2010

Alexandra Nicole Cardona Rodríguez (born 12 January 1989), known as Alexa Cardona, is an American-born Puerto Rican retired footballer who has played as a forward. She has been a member of the Puerto Rico women's national team. She is the sister of Julián Cardona.

== Early and personal life ==
Cardona was raised in Lincoln, Nebraska.

== International goals ==
Scores and results list Puerto Rico's goal tally first.

No.	Date	Venue	Opponent	Score	Result	Competition
1	21 March 2010	Juan Ramón Loubriel Stadium, Bayamón, Puerto Rico	Dominica	1–0	6–0	2010 CONCACAF Women's World Cup Qualifying qualification
2	21 March 2010	Juan Ramón Loubriel Stadium, Bayamón, Puerto Rico	Dominica	5–0	6–0	2010 CONCACAF Women's World Cup Qualifying qualification
