= Adeline Saintilmond =

Haitian footballer (born 1984)

Personal information
- Date of birth: 14 December 1984 (age 41)
- Position: Forward

Senior career*
| Years | Team | Apps | (Gls) |
| 2010 | Valentina FC | | |
| 2011 | Quebec Dynamo ARSQ | | |

International career^{‡}
| 2010–2012 | Haiti | 12 | (4) |
- * Club domestic league appearances and goals ‡ National team caps and goals as of 23 January 2012.

Adeline Saintilmond (born 14 December 1984) is a Haitian former footballer who played as a forward. She has been a member of the Haiti women's national team.

== Club career ==
Saintilmond has played for Valentina FC in Haiti and for Quebec Dynamo ARSQ in Canada.

== International career ==
Saintilmond capped for Haiti at senior level during the 2010 Central American and Caribbean Games, the 2010 CONCACAF Women's World Cup Qualifying and the 2012 CONCACAF Women's Olympic Qualifying Tournament.

=== International goals ===
Scores and results list Haiti' goal tally first.

| No. | Date | Venue | Opponent | Score | Result | Competition | Ref. |
|---|---|---|---|---|---|---|---|
| 1 | 28 March 2010 | Estadio Panamericano, San Cristóbal, Dominican Republic | Turks and Caicos Islands | 2–0 | 5–0 | 2010 CONCACAF Women's World Cup Qualifying qualification | |
| 2 | 30 March 2010 | Estadio Panamericano, San Cristóbal, Dominican Republic | Dominican Republic | 1–0 | 2–1 | 2010 CONCACAF Women's World Cup Qualifying qualification | |
| 3 | 15 May 2010 | Manny Ramjohn Stadium San Fernando, Trinidad and Tobago | Puerto Rico | 1–0 | 2–0 | 2010 CONCACAF Women's World Cup Qualifying qualification | |
| 4 | 1 November 2010 | Estadio Olímpico Andrés Quintana Roo, Cancún, México | Guatemala | 1–0 | 1–0 | 2010 CONCACAF Women's World Cup Qualifying | |
