= Madelyn Ventura =

Guatemalan footballer

Personal information
- Full name: Madelyn Ruby Ventura de León
- Date of birth: 13 February 1997 (age 29)
- Place of birth: Guatemala
- Position: Forward

Team information
- Current team: Huehuetecas

Senior career*
Years	Team	Apps	(Gls)
–2018	Xelajú		
2018–2019	Zaragoza CFF		
2021–2022	Suchitepéquez		
2022–	Huehuetecas		

International career
2022–	Guatemala	3	(0)
- * Club domestic league appearances and goals

Madelyn Ruby Ventura de León (born 13 February 1997) is a Guatemalan footballer who plays as a forward for Xelajú.

== Career ==
In 2018, Ventura signed for Spanish side Zaragoza CFF. In 2021, she signed for Suchitepéquez in Guatemala after receiving offers from Greece, Costa Rica, Colombia, and Italy, helping them win their only league title.
