= Ashlee Savona =

Guyanese footballer (born 1992)

Personal information
- Date of birth: 12 December 1992 (age 33)
- Place of birth: Mississauga, Ontario, Canada
- Height: 1.57 m (5 ft 2 in)
- Position: Midfielder

Youth career
- 2006: Ajax SC
- 2007: Oakville SC
- 2008: Dixie SC

College career
Years	Team	Apps	(Gls)
- Humber Hawks
2010–2013	Northwestern State Demons	68	(15)

Senior career*
Years	Team	Apps	(Gls)
2012	Toronto Lady Lynx		
2015	ProStars FC		

International career^{‡}
2011–2012	Guyana U20	6	(7)
2010–	Guyana	10+	(1+)
- * Club domestic league appearances and goals ‡ National team caps and goals as of 11 January 2012

Ashlee Savona (born 12 December 1992) is a women's international footballer who plays as a midfielder. Born in Canada, she represented the Guyana national team.

== College career ==
Savona was honored as an all-Southland Conference performer during her junior and senior seasons. She was also the first Northwestern State University player to play on a national team when she was named to the Guyana national squad in 2010, since her mother came from Guyana. She was part of the team at the 2016 CONCACAF Women's Olympic Qualifying Championship.

After four years at Northwestern, where she obtained her bachelor's degree in accounting, Savona joined University of Alabama in Huntsville as an assistant coach.

== Club career ==
In 2015, Savona played for ProStars FC in League1 Ontario.

== International career ==
In 2008, she was recruited to the Guyana national team after her father was introduced to the head coach of the new program. She debuted in 2010 when the team formally began play. She later returned to the senior team in 2016 at the 2016 CONCACAF Women's Olympic Qualifying Championship, for the first time since 2010.

In 2011, she played and was named co-captain of the Guyana U20.

== International goals ==
Scores and results list Guyana's goal tally first

No.	Date	Venue	Opponent	Score	Result	Competition
1	10 May 2010	Marvin Lee Stadium, Macoya, Trinidad and Tobago	Barbados	3–0	3–0	2010 CONCACAF Women's World Cup Qualifying qualification

== See also ==
- List of Guyana women's international footballers
