= Karla Maya =

Mexican football manager

Personal information
- Full name: Karla Maya Vera
- Date of birth: 10 July 1974 (age 52)
- Place of birth: Mexico City, Mexico
- Height: 1.63 m (5 ft 4 in)

Team information
- Current team: Guatemala (women) (Head coach)

Managerial career
- Years: Team
- 2021–2022: Mexico U–15 women
- 2023: Atlas U-18 (women)
- 2024–2025: Santos Laguna (women)
- 2025–: Guatemala (women)

Karla Maya Vera (born 10 July 1974) is a Mexican manager who is the current manager of the Guatemala women's national football team.

== Coaching career ==
Maya started his coaching career managing Mexico U–15 women, from 2021 to 2022. In 2023, Maya signed as head coach of Atlas U-18 (women). In 2024, she was appointed as manager of Santos Laguna (women) in the Liga MX Femenil.
