= Afiyah Matthias =

Trinidad and Tobago footballer

Personal information
- Date of birth: 20 December 1992 (age 33)
- Position: Midfielder

Senior career*
Years	Team	Apps	(Gls)
- Real Dimension

International career^{‡}
2009–2012	Trinidad and Tobago U20	11	(1)
2010–2014	Trinidad and Tobago	5	(1)
- * Club domestic league appearances and goals ‡ National team caps and goals as of 15 October 2014.

Afiyah Matthias (born 20 December 1992) is a Trinidad and Tobago footballer who plays as a midfielder. She has been a member of the Trinidad and Tobago women's national team.

== Club career ==
Matthias has played for Real Dimension in Trinidad and Tobago.

== International career ==
Matthias capped for Trinidad and Tobago at senior level during the 2010 CONCACAF Women's World Cup Qualifying and the 2014 CONCACAF Women's Championship.
