= Carmen Reyes =

American-born Puerto Rican footballer

Personal information
- Full name: Carmen M Reyes Bly
- Date of birth: 11 June 1989 (age 37)
- Place of birth: Hayden, Idaho, United States
- Height: 1.78 m (5 ft 10 in)
- Position: Defender

Youth career
- Coeur d'Alene High School

College career
Years	Team	Apps	(Gls)
2007–2010	Montana Lady Griz	51	(2)

International career^{‡}
2010	Puerto Rico	8	(2)
- ‡ National team caps and goals as of 1 August 2010

Carmen M. Reyes Bly (born 11 June 1989) is an American-born Puerto Rican retired footballer who has played as a defender. She has been a member of the Puerto Rico women's national team. Once she retired, she became a teacher.

== Early and personal life ==
Reyes was raised in Hayden, Idaho. She was born to a Puerto Rican–American father and a Norwegian–American mother.

== International goals ==
Scores and results list Puerto Rico's goal tally first.

No.	Date	Venue	Opponent	Score	Result	Competition
1	19 March 2010	Juan Ramón Loubriel Stadium, Bayamón, Puerto Rico	Saint Kitts and Nevis	4–0	7–0	2010 CONCACAF Women's World Cup Qualifying qualification
2	13 May 2010	Manny Ramjohn Stadium, Marabella, Trinidad and Tobago	Antigua and Barbuda	5–0	8–0	2010 CONCACAF Women's World Cup Qualifying qualification
