= Mariam El-Masri =

Guyanese footballer (born 1991)

Personal information
- Date of birth: 20 June 1991 (age 35)
- Place of birth: Scarborough, Ontario, Canada
- Position: Midfielder

Team information
- Current team: Warriors FC
- Number: 11

Youth career
- Wexford SC

College career
Years	Team	Apps	(Gls)
2011	Centennial Colts	7	(4)
2015	Seneca Sting	9	(10)

Senior career*
Years	Team	Apps	(Gls)
–2013	GS United		
2013–2016	Boldklubben 1921		
2016	Warriors FC		

International career^{‡}
2010–	Guyana	10	(4)
- * Club domestic league appearances and goals ‡ National team caps and goals as of 11:49, 4 October 2015 (UTC)

Mariam El-Masri (born 20 June 1991) is a footballer who plays as a midfielder. Born in Canada, she represents Guyana internationally.

== Early and personal life ==
She was born in Scarborough, Ontario to a Tunisian father and a Guyanese mother. She played youth soccer with Wexford SC in Scarborough. Her older brother Sherif is also a footballer who represented Canada U23 internationally. She is an alumna of Agincourt Collegiate Institute, in Scarborough, Ontario. In 2011, she attended Centennial College and played for the women's team.

== Playing career ==
She won the 2012 Ontario Women Soccer League with GS (Gursikh Sabha) United before signing on with Boldklubben 1921 in Denmark.

El-Masri made Guyana's first-ever goal in the CONCACAF Women's Championship in 2010, then Guyana's first-ever goal in the CONCACAF Women's Olympic Qualifying Championship in 2016.

In 2015, she attended Seneca College, playing for their women's team.

She sustained a severe concussion and took a break from football, but returned to join GS United in Toronto, winning the Ontario Championships and coming in third in the Canadian National Championships.

== International goals ==
Scores and results list Guyana's goal tally first

No.	Date	Venue	Opponent	Score	Result	Competition
1	10 May 2010	Marvin Lee Stadium, Macoya, Trinidad and Tobago	Barbados	1–0	3–0	2010 CONCACAF Women's World Cup Qualifying qualification
2	12 May 2010	Marvin Lee Stadium, Macoya, Trinidad and Tobago	Saint Lucia	1–0	8–0	2010 CONCACAF Women's World Cup Qualifying qualification
3	21 August 2015	Estadio Panamericano, San Cristóbal, Dominican Republic	Saint Kitts and Nevis	4–0	8–0	2016 CONCACAF Women's Olympic Qualifying Championship qualification
4	20 November 2015	Ato Boldon Stadium, Couva, Trinidad and Tobago	Jamaica	1–1	2–1	2016 CONCACAF Women's Olympic Qualifying Championship qualification
5	14 February 2016	BBVA Compass Stadium, Houston, United States	Guatemala	1–1	2–1	2016 CONCACAF Women's Olympic Qualifying Championship
6	29 April 2018	Ato Boldon Stadium, Couva, Trinidad and Tobago	Trinidad and Tobago	1–1	1–3	2018 CFU Women's Challenge Series

== See also ==
- List of Guyana women's international footballers
