= Danielle Blair =

Trinidad and Tobago footballer

Personal information
- Full name: Danielle Rachel Blair
- Date of birth: 16 June 1988 (age 38)
- Place of birth: Scarborough, Ontario, Canada
- Height: 1.57 m (5 ft 2 in)
- Position: Defender

Youth career
- Pope Panthers

College career
Years	Team	Apps	(Gls)
2006–2009	UAB Blazers		

International career^{‡}
2010–2011	Trinidad and Tobago	7	(0)
- ‡ National team caps and goals as of 22 October 2011.

Danielle Rachel Blair (born 16 June 1988) is a Canadian-born Trinidad and Tobago footballer who plays as a defender. She has been a member of the Trinidad and Tobago women's national team.

== High school and college career ==
Blair has attended the St. John Paul II Catholic Secondary School in Scarborough, Ontario and the University of Alabama in Birmingham, Alabama, United States.

== International career ==
Blair capped for Trinidad and Tobago at senior level during the 2010 CONCACAF Women's World Cup Qualifying and the 2011 Pan American Games.
