= Harry Pace =

American music executive

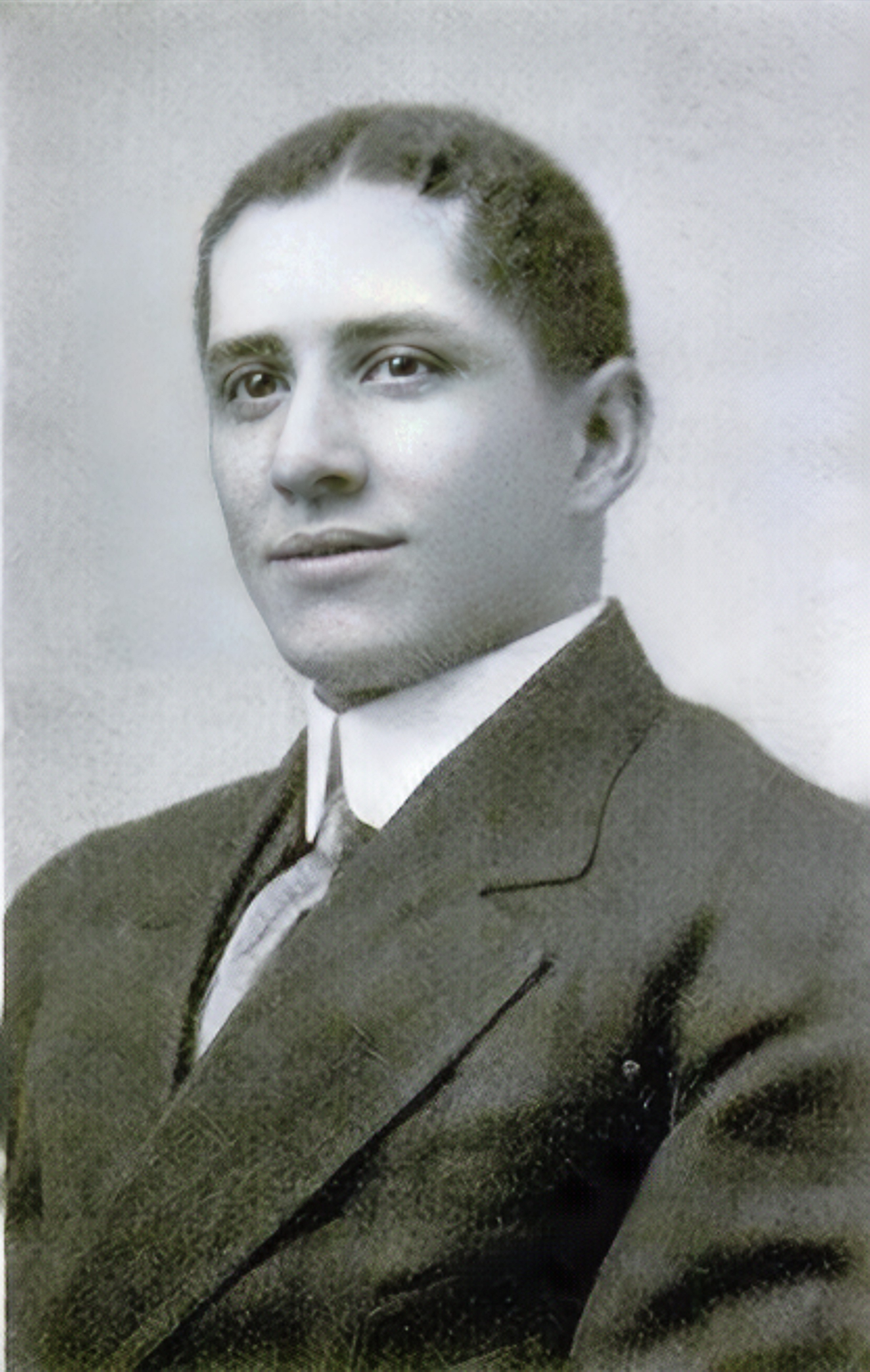
- Pace, circa 1911
- Born: January 6, 1884; Covington, Georgia, US
- Died: July 19, 1943 (aged 59); Chicago, Illinois, US
- Education: Atlanta University; Chicago-Kent College of Law
- Occupations: Record executive, insurance executive, lawyer
- Known for: Founder of Black Swan Records

Harry Herbert Pace (January 6, 1884 – July 19, 1943) was an American music publisher and insurance executive. He was the founder of Black Swan Records, the first record label owned by an African American with wide distribution capabilities.

Pace began successful insurance companies in New Jersey and Chicago. He eventually went to law school in Chicago and became a lawyer. Although he supported African-Americans and African American causes (for example, he paid for the future path-breaking publisher John H. Johnson to finish the University of Chicago through the Urban League), it is possible he began passing as white in his later legal career.

== Early life ==
Harry Pace was born in Covington, Georgia. According to a 1917 biography Pace's "Grandfather was brought from Virginia to Georgia during the days of slavery, but was manumitted by his master, to whom he was related." There is little known about his parents. He finished primary school at the age of twelve.

== Career ==
Pace enrolled at Atlanta University and found work as a printer's devil to pay his way through school. However, after learning that white employees were earning more than black employees, Pace left the job and began working odd jobs on campus instead. It was at Atlanta University that Pace met W. E. B. Du Bois, who was one of his teachers. Pace graduated valedictorian of his class in 1903. He was 19 years old.

After receiving a degree, Pace taught at the Haines Institute before going into the printing business with Du Bois in Memphis, Tennessee. Together, they published the short-lived magazine The Moon Illustrated Weekly. Pace next taught Latin and Greek at the Lincoln Institute in Jefferson City, Missouri, before returning to Memphis to work at Solvent Savings Bank and Trust.

In 1907, Pace met and collaborated with W. C. Handy, who took a liking to him; they wrote songs together. In Memphis, Pace also met and married Ethylene Bibb. Pace and Handy founded the Pace and Handy Music Company, which brought Pace to New York City. Around 1920, the company began working with composers William Grant Still and Fletcher Henderson. Although the company did well, their business consisted largely of writing and selling sheet music to be played at home, commonly called parlour music. Pace saw the growing popularity of the phonograph would shift the music business as it reached a wider audience. Handy had no interest in changing the business and Pace resigned.

In 1917, Pace, along with James Weldon Johnson, Dr. Charles S. Johnson, Dr. Louis T. Wright and Walter Francis White, chartered the Atlanta Branch of the NAACP.

In 1921, then living in Harlem, Pace established Black Swan Records. On the recommendation of W. E. B. Du Bois, the label was named for singer Elizabeth Taylor Greenfield, who was called "the Black Swan." At the time of the establishment of the label, Pace declared

There are twelve million colored people in [the] US, and in that number there is hid a wonderful amount of musical ability. We propose to spare no expense in the search for and developing of the best singers and musicians among the twelve million.

They had offices in the Gaiety Theatre office building in Times Square. Pace also set up a recording studio in the basement of his brownstone.

For his record company, Pace brought in Henderson as recording manager and Still as arranger. His first releases featured performances of light classical music, blues, spirituals, and instrumental solos. Black Swan’s first hit was a recording of "Down Home Blues" and "Oh, Daddy", sung by Ethel Waters. Although Pace recorded many outstanding artists, the business failed and Pace was forced to declare bankruptcy in December 1923. A few months later, he sold Black Swan to Paramount Records.

In 1925, Pace founded the Northeastern Life Insurance Company in Newark, New Jersey, which became the largest African-American-owned business in the North during the 1930s.

Pace then moved to Chicago to attend the Chicago-Kent College of Law; he received his degree in 1933. As a lawyer, he was involved with the Hansberry v. Lee case. In 1943 Pace died mysteriously, and was buried quietly, even before his closest friends knew he had died.

A newspaper article around the time of his death questioned why there was so much secrecy surrounding the death of such a “National figure”. Harry Pace’s children began living as white and never spoke of him again; shrouding his legacy within a family secret. His progeny would not discover their African-American ancestry until 2007.

Pace died on July 19, 1943, in Chicago.

== Legacy ==
Pace is featured on the documentary series Profiles of African-American Success. In 2021, Pace was profiled in Jad Abumrad and Shima Oliaee's miniseries The Vanishing of Harry Pace on Radiolab. In the series Harry Pace's descendants as well as scholars are interviewed. Harry Pace's great-grandson Eric Pace and his wife Candace Edwards are featured on episode 3 in which they discuss their musical project "THE PACES".
