= Denisse Soltero =

Puerto Rican footballer

Personal information
- Full name: Denisse Soltero Rodríguez
- Date of birth: 28 June 1989 (age 37)
- Place of birth: Mayagüez, Puerto Rico
- Height: 1.57 m (5 ft 2 in)
- Positions: Forward; midfielder

Youth career
- Colegio San Benito

College career
| Years | Team | Apps | (Gls) |
| 2008–2011 | North Florida Ospreys | 73 | (4) |

International career^{‡}
| 2010 | Puerto Rico | 4 | (1) |
- ‡ National team caps and goals as of 1 August 2010

Denisse Soltero Rodríguez (born 28 June 1989) is a Puerto Rican retired footballer who has played as a forward and a midfielder. She has been a member of the Puerto Rico women's national team.

== Early and personal life ==
Soltero was raised in Mayagüez.

== International goals ==
Scores and results list Puerto Rico's goal tally first.

| No. | Date | Venue | Opponent | Score | Result | Competition |
|---|---|---|---|---|---|---|
| 1 | 13 May 2010 | Manny Ramjohn Stadium, Marabella, Trinidad and Tobago | Antigua and Barbuda | 4–0 | 8–0 | 2010 CONCACAF Women's World Cup Qualifying qualification |
