= Wendy Hernández =

Salvadoran footballer (born 1996)

Personal information
- Full name: Wendy Esmeralda Hernández Hernández
- Date of birth: 20 March 1996 (age 30)
- Position: Defender

International career^{‡}
Years	Team	Apps	(Gls)
2018	El Salvador	2+	(1+)
- ‡ National team caps and goals as of 31 August 2018.

Wendy Esmeralda Hernández Hernández (born 20 March 1996) is a Salvadoran footballer who plays as a defender. She has been a member of the El Salvador women's national team.

== International career ==
Hernández capped for El Salvador at senior level during the 2018 CONCACAF Women's Championship qualification.

=== International goals ===
Scores and results list El Salvador goal tally first

No.	Date	Venue	Opponent	Score	Result	Competition	Ref.
1	27 June 2018	Havana, Cuba	Cuba	1–?	1–2	Friendly	

== See also ==
- List of El Salvador women's international footballers
