= Rosa Merino (footballer) =

Salvadoran footballer (born 1992)

Personal information
- Full name: Rosa Margarita Merino Corcio
- Date of birth: 23 July 1992 (age 34)
- Position: Midfielder

International career^{‡}
Years	Team	Apps	(Gls)
2009	El Salvador U20	4	(0)
2010	El Salvador	2	(1)
- ‡ National team caps and goals as of 22 April 2010.

Rosa Margarita Merino Corcio (born 23 July 1992) is a Salvadoran footballer who plays as a midfielder. She has been a member of the El Salvador women's national team.

== International career ==
Merino capped for El Salvador at senior level during the 2010 CONCACAF Women's World Cup Qualifying qualification.

=== International goals ===
Scores and results list El Salvador's goal tally first.

No.	Date	Venue	Opponent	Score	Result	Competition	Ref.
1	20 April 2010	Estadio Pensativo, Antigua Guatemala, Guatemala	Belize	1–0	9–0	2010 CONCACAF Women's World Cup Qualifying qualification	

== See also ==
- List of El Salvador women's international footballers
