= Julian Cardona =

American-born Puerto Rican footballer (born 1990)

Personal information
- Full name: Julian Joseph Cardona
- Date of birth: December 4, 1990 (age 35)
- Place of birth: Lincoln, Nebraska, U.S.
- Height: 1.78 m (5 ft 10 in)
- Position: Forward

College career
Years	Team	Apps	(Gls)
2009–2010	Butler Bulldogs		
2011–2012	Penn State Nittany Lions		

Senior career*
Years	Team	Apps	(Gls)
2012	Reading United	4	(0)

International career^{‡}
2011	Puerto Rico	1	(0)
- * Club domestic league appearances and goals as of July 1, 2012 ‡ National team caps and goals as of November 30, 2011

Julian Joseph Cardona (born December 4, 1990) is an American-born Puerto Rican international footballer. He is the brother of Alexa Cardona.
