= Martha Taboas =

American-born Puerto Rican footballer

Personal information
- Full name: Martha Liz Taboas Rivera
- Date of birth: 25 March 1989 (age 37)
- Place of birth: United States
- Position: Defender

College career
Years	Team	Apps	(Gls)
2010–2011	Mars Hill Lions	33	(0)
2012	Palm Beach Atlantic Sailfish	18	(7)

International career^{‡}
2010	Puerto Rico	10	(1)
- ‡ National team caps and goals as of 1 August 2010

Martha Liz Taboas Rivera (born 25 March 1989) is an American-born Puerto Rican retired footballer who has played as a defender. She has been a member of the Puerto Rico women's national team.

== Early life ==
Taboas was raised in Orlando, Florida.

== International goals ==
Scores and results list Puerto Rico's goal tally first.

No.	Date	Venue	Opponent	Score	Result	Competition
1	13 May 2010	Manny Ramjohn Stadium, Marabella, Trinidad and Tobago	Antigua and Barbuda	7–0	8–0	2010 CONCACAF Women's World Cup Qualifying qualification
