= Gloria Lohaiza =

Guatemalan footballer

Amarilis Lohaiza
Personal information
- Full name: Gloria Amarilis Lohaiza Barillas
- Date of birth: 22 April 1987 (age 39)
- Position: Midfielder

Senior career*
Years	Team	Apps	(Gls)
2010–2012	Profutbol		

International career^{‡}
2010–2012	Guatemala	15	(1)
- * Club domestic league appearances and goals ‡ National team caps and goals as of 24 January 2012

Gloria Amarilis Lohaiza Barillas (born 22 April 1987), known as Amarilis Lohaiza, is a Guatemalan retired footballer who played as a midfielder. She has been a member of the Guatemala women's national team.

== International career ==
Lohaiza capped for Guatemala at senior level during the 2010 CONCACAF Women's World Cup Qualifying qualification, the 2010 Central American and Caribbean Games and the 2012 CONCACAF Women's Olympic Qualifying Tournament (and its qualification).
