= Brittany Persaud =

Guyanese footballer

Personal information
- Date of birth: 1 April 1990 (age 36)
- Place of birth: Westerville, Ohio, United States
- Height: 1.63 m (5 ft 4 in)
- Position: Forward

Team information
- Current team: Portland Thorns FC
- Number: 48

College career
Years	Team	Apps	(Gls)
2008	Dayton Flyers	8	(0)
2009–2011	Wright State Raiders	61	(16)

Senior career*
Years	Team	Apps	(Gls)
2012	Kungsbacka DFF	7	(0)
2012–2013	ADO Den Haag	15	(1)
2013–2014	Telstar	14	(2)
2021	Portland Thorns FC	0	(0)

International career^{‡}
2010–2018	Guyana	7+	(2+)
- * Club domestic league appearances and goals as of 27 July 2022 ‡ National team caps and goals as of 25 April 2018

Brittany Persaud (born 1 April 1990) is a former footballer who played as a forward. Born in the United States, she represented the Guyana national team. She played college soccer for Dayton and Wright State.

== College career ==
At Wright State, Persaud was the all-time leader in assists with 24 during her three-year Raider career, and eighth in points with 56 (16 goals, 24 assists) and shots attempted with 146.

== Club career ==
Persaud played for the Swedish team Kungsbacka DFF in 2012.

Returning to the United States, Persaud signed on with the Ohio-based Dayton Dutch Lions WFC in 2015, appeared on the bench for Portland Thorns FC during the 2021 NWSL Challenge Cup, and plays for the Westside Timbers of Women's Premier Soccer League.

== International career ==
Scores and results list Guyana's goal tally first

No.	Date	Venue	Opponent	Score	Result	Competition
1	5 March 2010	Georgetown Cricket Club Ground, Georgetown, Guyana	Suriname	1–0	2–0	2010 CONCACAF Women's World Cup Qualifying qualification
2	3 July 2010	Providence Stadium, Georgetown, Guyana	Cuba	2–1	3–1	2010 CONCACAF Women's World Cup Qualifying qualification
3	20 November 2015	Ato Boldon Stadium, Couva, Trinidad and Tobago	Jamaica	2–1	2–1	2016 CONCACAF Women's Olympic Qualifying Championship qualification
4	27 April 2018	Ato Boldon Stadium, Couva, Trinidad and Tobago	Suriname	2–1	2–2	2018 CFU Women's Challenge Series
5	25 May 2018	Synthetic Track and Field Facility, Leonora, Guyana	Suriname	1–1	6–1	2018 CONCACAF Women's Championship qualification
6	25 May 2018	Synthetic Track and Field Facility, Leonora, Guyana	Suriname	5–1	6–1	2018 CONCACAF Women's Championship qualification

== Managerial career ==
In 2019, Persaud was a part of the coaching team for Guyana's U20 Women's Team

== Honours ==
ADO Den Haag

Winner

- KNVB Women's Cup: 2012–13

Runners-up

- BeNe Super Cup: 2012–13

== Personal life ==
Persaud obtained her Bachelor of Science in Biological Sciences, Exercise Science at Wright State She also earned a Master of Science in Human Movement Sciences at Vrije Universiteit Amsterdam in the Netherlands during her European football career.

== See also ==
- List of Guyana women's international footballers
