= Islara Rodríguez =

Puerto Rican footballer

Personal information
- Full name: Islara U. Rodríguez Vega
- Date of birth: 24 April 1988 (age 38)
- Place of birth: Houston, Texas, United States
- Height: 1.57 m (5 ft 2 in)
- Position: Forward

Youth career
- Awty International School

College career
Years	Team	Apps	(Gls)
2007–2008	Houston Cougars	36	(4)

International career^{‡}
2010	Puerto Rico	6	(2)
- ‡ National team caps and goals as of 28 July 2010

Islara U. Rodríguez Vega (born 24 April 1988) is an American-born Puerto Rican lawyer and a retired footballer who has played as a forward. She has been a member of the Puerto Rico women's national team.

== Early and personal life ==
Rodríguez was born and raised in Houston, Texas to José Rodríguez and Amarilis Vega. She has married a Turk named Volkan Irgit.

== International goals ==
Scores and results list Puerto Rico's goal tally first.

No.	Date	Venue	Opponent	Score	Result	Competition
1	19 March 2010	Juan Ramón Loubriel Stadium, Bayamón, Puerto Rico	Saint Kitts and Nevis	3–0	7–0	2010 CONCACAF Women's World Cup Qualifying qualification
2	28 July 2010	Estadio Metropolitano, Mérida, Venezuela	Trinidad and Tobago	1–2	2–3	2010 Central American and Caribbean Games
