= Géralda Saintilus =

Haitian footballer (born 1985)

Personal information
- Date of birth: 10 December 1985 (age 40)
- Place of birth: Hinche, Haiti
- Position: Goalkeeper

International career^{‡}
Years	Team	Apps	(Gls)
2010–2014	Haiti	18	(0)
- ‡ National team caps and goals as of 21 November 2014

Géralda Saintilus (born 10 December 1985) is a Haitian footballer who plays as a goalkeeper. She has been a member of the Haiti women's national team.
