= List of Guyana women's international footballers =

This is a non-exhaustive list of Guyana women's international footballers – association football players who have appeared at least once for the senior Guyana women's national football team.

== Players ==
Key
**Bold**	Named to the national team in the past year

Name	Caps	Goals	National team years	Club(s)	Ref.
Shondel Archer	2+	0+	2010	Retired	
Dana Bally	1+	0+	2016		
**Samantha Banfield**	1	0	2021–	(Canada) Woodbridge Strikers B	
Alyssa Budhoo	2+	0+	2010	Retired	
Donna Carvalhal	7+	0+	2010	Retired	
Akilah Castello	2+	0+	2010	Retired	
**Otesha Charles**	3+	0+	2016–	(England) Gillingham	
**Calaigh Copland**	1+	0+			
Ronette Cort	2+	0+	2010	Retired	
**Sydney Cummings**	1+	1+	2018–	(United States) San Diego Wave, (Australia) Western United	
**Briana De Souza**	3+	0+	2016–		
**Brianne Desa**	1+	1+	2018–	(Canada) Durham United FA	
**Kayla Desouza**	3+	0+	2016–		
Tessa Edwards	3+	0+	2010		
**Mariam El-Masri**	1+	0+			
Melissia Elie	3+	0+	2010	Retired	
Tenyka Francique	5+	0+	2010	Retired	
Julia Gonsalves	1+	0+			
Olivia Gonsalves	2+	0+	2016		
**Cameo Hazlewood**	1+	0+	2018–		
Alison Heydorn	1+	0+			
Collette Hope	8+	0+	2010	Retired	
Sasha James	1+	0+	2018		
**Ghilene Joseph**	1+	0+	2018–	(United States) Titanes Soccer Club	
Catherine Kobelka	6+	0+	2010	Retired	
**Stefanie Kouzas**	1+	0+	2021–	(Canada) Monteuil, (Canada) Sélect Rive-Sud, (Canada) Longueuil, (Canada) St-Hubert	
Kailey Leila	3+	0+	2016		
Chantal Lynch	1+	0+	2010	Retired	
**Serena McDonald**	1	0	2021–	(Canada) York Lions	
Karina Moore	3+	0+	2010	Retired	
Jessica Myers	1+	0+			
**Natalie Nedd**	1+	0+	2018–	(United States) Graceland Yellowjackets	
Aneesa O'Brien	1+	0+	2018	(United States) Jacksonville State Gamecocks	
Daria Owen	5+	1+	2010	Retired	
**Lakeisha Pearson**	1+	0+	2018–	Guyana Police Force FC	
**Brittany Persaud**	1+	0+			
Nikkita Persaud	3+	0+	2010		
Jordanna Phillips	6+	0+	2010	Retired	
Leah-Marie Ramalho	3+	0+	2016		
Ashley Rodrigues	3+	0+	2016	Retired	
**Justine Rodrigues**	3+	0+	2016–		
Nailah Rowe	1+	0+	2018	(Canada) Centennial College	
**Makayla Rudder**	1+	0+	2021–		
**Gabriella Salvadore**	1+	0+	2021–		
**Chanté Sandiford**	3+	0+	2016–	(Iceland) Stjarnan	
Ashlee Savona	3+	0+	2016		
**Tiandi Smith**	1+	0+	2018–	Guyana Police Force FC	
**Rylee Traicoff**	1+	0+	2018–	(United States) Nipissing Lakers	
**Annalisa Vincent**	1+	0+	2018–	(Guyana) GT Panthers FC	
Jade Vyfhuis	1+	0+	2018	(Canada) Ryerson Rams	
Taylor White	1+	0+	2018		
Bria Williams	2+	1+	2016		
Alicia Zaban	1+	0+	2018		

== See also ==
- Guyana women's national football team
