= List of El Salvador women's international footballers =

This is a non-exhaustive list of El Salvador women's international footballers – association football players who have appeared at least once for the senior El Salvador women's national football team.

== Players ==
Key
**Bold**	Named to the national team in the past year

Name	Caps	Goals	National team years	Club(s)
Katerin Alfaro	2	0	2010	Unknown
**Andrea Amaya**	1	0	–	(Ecuador) Club Ñañas
Marisa Antonio	3	0	2013	Unknown
Yanci Bermúdez	3	0	2010–2011	Unknown
**Marilyn Cabrera**	2	0	–	(El Salvador) Alianza
Cristina Cáceres	4	0	2010–2011	Unknown
Paola Calderón	2	0	2019	(El Salvador) FAS
Patricia Campos	2	2	2010	Unknown
Brenda Cerén	3	1	–	(Mexico) Atlas
**Sandra Cortez**	6	0	–	(El Salvador) FAS
Elizabeth Coto	6	0	2010–2011	Unknown
**Ismelda Cruz**	1	0	–	(El Salvador) Limeño
Yaquelín Durán	3	0	–	(El Salvador) FAS
Adriana Flores	7	0	2010–2013	Unknown
Karla Flores	1	0	2018	(El Salvador) FAS
**Linda Frías**	1	0	2021–	(Mexico) Santos Laguna
Samaria Gómez	2	0	2022–	(Mexico) Necaxa
Wendy Gómez	3	0	2013	Unknown
**Amaya González**	2	0	2021–	(United States) Colorado Buffaloes
**Francisca González**	3	0	–	(El Salvador) FAS
Leyla González	6	0	2010–2011	(El Salvador) FAS
**Irma Hernández**	3	0	–	(El Salvador) Alianza
Wendy Hernández	1	0	2018	Unknown
Alejandra Herrera	8	3	2010–2018	(El Salvador) Alianza
Karen Landaverde	9	6	2010–2013	Unknown
Blanca Lemus	1	0	2018	Unknown
Mirian León	2	0	2010	Unknown
Yoselyn López	1	0	2019	(El Salvador) Sonsonate
Yamilath Menéndez	1	0	2011	Unknown
**Zulia Menjívar**	5	0	–	(El Salvador) FAS
Rosa Merino	2	1	2010	Unknown
**Victoria Meza**	2	0	–	(El Salvador) College Cup
**Lesly Molina**	2	0	–	(El Salvador) Alianza
Marcela Ordóñez	3	0	2010–2011	Unknown
**Priscila Ortiz**	4	0	–	(El Salvador) Alianza
Ingrid Osegueda	1	1	2017	Unknown
Pauline Ovalle	4	0	2011–2013	Unknown
Liliana Payés	1	1	2017	(El Salvador) Alianza
Maritza Pérez	3	0	2013	Unknown
Norma Portillo	6	1	2010–2013	Unknown
**Jeimy Prudencio**	6	0	–	(El Salvador) Limeño
**Damaris Quélez**	7	2	–	(El Salvador) FAS
Rut Quintanilla	1	0	2013	Unknown
**Daniela Ramírez**	1	0	2021–	(Canada) Vancouver Whitecaps U-18
Jency Ramírez	5	1	2011–2018	Unknown
María Leonor Ramírez	2	0	2010–2011	Unknown
Nelly Ramírez	2	0	2018	(El Salvador) Alianza
Pamela Ramírez	2	0	2011	Unknown
Robinette Ramírez	5	1	2011–2013	Unknown
Ingrid Ramos	8	4	–	(El Salvador) Alianza
**Joseline Rivas**	6	0	–	(El Salvador) Santa Tecla
Karla Rodríguez	3	0	2018	Unknown
Carolina Rolín	1	0	2018	(El Salvador) FAS
Tania Sánchez	1	0	2010	Unknown
**Maggi Segovia**	3	0	–	(El Salvador) FAS
Kimberly Surio	1	0	2019	(United States) Cal State Los Angeles Golden Eagles
Sandra Tamacas	4	1	–	(El Salvador) Alianza
Tatiana Terezón	2	0	–	(El Salvador) FAS
**Roxana Vega**	6	0	–	(El Salvador) FAS
**Stephanie Zúñiga**	2	0	2021–	(Brazil) Cruzeiro

== See also ==
- El Salvador women's national football team
