= María Monterroso =

Guatemalan footballer (born 1993)

María Amanda Monterroso
Personal information
- Full name: María Amanda Monterroso Asteguieta
- Date of birth: 30 November 1993 (age 32)
- Place of birth: Guatemala City, Guatemala
- Height: 1.68 m (5 ft 6 in)
- Position: Forward

Team information
- Current team: Real Unión de Tenerife
- Number: 12

College career
Years	Team	Apps	(Gls)
2012	Lyon College		(20)
2014–2016	Grand Canyon Antelopes	42	(14)

Senior career*
Years	Team	Apps	(Gls)
2017	Alianza Petrolera		
2017–2019	Unifut Rosal		
2019–2020	Extremadura	1+	(1+)
2020–2021	PM Friol	14	(1)
2021–2022	Badajoz		
2022–2023	Málaga	27	(3)
2023–	Real Unión de Tenerife	1	(0)

International career^{‡}
2010–2012	Guatemala U20	7	(6)
2010–	Guatemala	27	(14)
- * Club domestic league appearances and goals as of 22 October 2023 ‡ National team caps and goals as of 19 February 2022

María Amanda Monterroso Asteguieta (born 30 November 1993) is a Guatemalan footballer who plays as a forward for Spanish Segunda Federación club Real Unión de Tenerife and the Guatemala women's national team. Before joining Tenerife, She played for Malaga CF and CD Badajoz among others.

She is the sister to Coralia Monterroso.

== International goals ==
Scores and results list Guatemala's goal tally first.

No.	Date	Venue	Opponent	Score	Result	Competition
1.	30 September 2011	Guatemala City, Guatemala	Honduras	1–0	3–1	2012 CONCACAF Women's Olympic Qualifying Tournament qualification
2.	24 January 2012	Vancouver, Canada	Dominican Republic	2–0	6–0	2012 CONCACAF Women's Olympic Qualifying Tournament
3.	24 January 2012	Vancouver, Canada	Dominican Republic	6–0	6–0	2012 CONCACAF Women's Olympic Qualifying Tournament
4.	10 March 2013	San José, Costa Rica	Honduras	1–0	6–2	2013 Central American Games
5.	10 March 2013	San José, Costa Rica	Honduras	3–2	6–2	2013 Central American Games
6.	10 March 2013	San José, Costa Rica	Honduras	5–2	6–2	2013 Central American Games
7.	10 March 2013	San José, Costa Rica	Honduras	6–2	6–2	2013 Central American Games
8.	12 March 2013	San José, Costa Rica	Nicaragua	1–2	1–2	2013 Central American Games
9.	15 March 2013	San José, Costa Rica	Panama	5–3	5–3	2013 Central American Games
10.	22 May 2014	Guatemala City, Guatemala	Honduras	2–0	3–2	2014 CONCACAF Women's Championship qualification
11.	16 February 2022	Antigua, Guatemala	U.S. Virgin Islands	8–0	9–0	2022 CONCACAF W Championship qualification
12.	19 February 2022	Willemstad, Curacao	Curaçao	2–0	6–0	2022 CONCACAF W Championship qualification
13.	19 February 2022	Willemstad, Curacao	Curaçao	3–0	6–0	2022 CONCACAF W Championship qualification
14.	1 July 2023	Santa Tecla, El Salvador	Costa Rica	1–0	2–1	2023 Central American and Caribbean Games
15.	7 July 2023	Santa Tecla, El Salvador	El Salvador	1–0	1–2	2023 Central American and Caribbean Games
16.	24 September 2023	Penonomé, Panama	Panama	1–0	3–2	2024 CONCACAF W Gold Cup qualification
17.	1 December 2025	Guatemala City, Guatemala	Bermuda	1–0	4–1	2026 CONCACAF W Championship qualification
18.	1 December 2025	Guatemala City, Guatemala	Bermuda	3–0	4–1	2026 CONCACAF W Championship qualification

== See also ==
- List of Guatemala women's international footballers
