= Ashley Rodrigues =

Canadian-born Guyanese footballer

Personal information
- Full name: Ashley Devia Rodrigues
- Date of birth: 12 September 1988 (age 38)
- Place of birth: Canada
- Height: 1.63 m (5 ft 4 in)
- Position: Forward

College career
Years	Team	Apps	(Gls)
2006–2009	Eastern Michigan Eagles	78	(21)

International career^{‡}
2010–2016	Guyana	10	(4)
- ‡ National team caps and goals as of 11:39, 4 October 2015 (UTC)

Ashley Devia Rodrigues (born 12 September 1988) is a Canadian-born Guyanese retired footballer who played as a forward. She has been a member of the Guyana women's national team.

== College career ==
Rodrigues played at Eastern Michigan.

== International goals ==
Scores and results list Guyana's goal tally first

No.	Date	Venue	Opponent	Score	Result	Competition
1	10 May 2010	Marvin Lee Stadium, Macoya, Trinidad and Tobago	Barbados	2–0	3–0	2010 CONCACAF Women's World Cup Qualifying qualification
2	12 May 2010	Marvin Lee Stadium, Macoya, Trinidad and Tobago	Saint Lucia	2–0	8–0	2010 CONCACAF Women's World Cup Qualifying qualification
3	12 May 2010	Marvin Lee Stadium, Macoya, Trinidad and Tobago	Saint Lucia	5–0	8–0	2010 CONCACAF Women's World Cup Qualifying qualification
4	3 July 2010	Providence Stadium, Georgetown, Guyana	Cuba	1–1	3–1	2010 CONCACAF Women's World Cup Qualifying qualification
5	23 August 2015	Estadio Panamericano, San Cristóbal, Dominican Republic	Cuba	1–0	1–1	2016 CONCACAF Women's Olympic Qualifying Championship qualification

== See also ==
- List of Guyana women's international footballers
