= Kimberly Boulos =

Haitian-American football player (born 1987)

Personal information
- Full name: Kimberly Alexis Boulos
- Date of birth: 16 April 1987 (age 39)
- Place of birth: Croton, New York, United States
- Height: 1.65 m (5 ft 5 in)
- Position: Midfielder

College career
Years	Team	Apps	(Gls)
2005–2006	South Carolina Gamecocks		
2007–2008	Fordham Rams		(16)

Senior career*
Years	Team	Apps	(Gls)
2009–2010	QBIK	24	(13)
2011	Kvarnsveden	9	(4)
2011–2012	Bollstanäs	29	(14)
20??–	San Francisco Nighthawks		

International career
2010–	Haiti	19	(2)
- * Club domestic league appearances and goals

Kimberly Alexis Boulos (born 16 April 1987) is a Haitian-American footballer who plays as a midfielder for Swedish club Bollstanäs.

== College career ==
Boulos played collegiate soccer for the Fordham Rams and the South Carolina Gamecocks.

Boulos has totaled 16 goals from 2007 to 2008 at Fordham, which is tied for tenth all-time at Rose Hill. She was a two-time All-Atlantic 10 selection (First Team – 2008; Second Team – 2007), a two-time All-Northeast Region pick (NSCAA Second Team – 2007; Soccer Buzz Magazine All-Northeast – 2008), and an Academic All-Atlantic 10 honoree (2008).

== International career ==
Boulos debuted for the Haiti national team in 2010.

== Personal ==
Boulos was born in Croton, New York to John and Gia Boulos. Her grandfather was footballer John "Frenchy" Boulos who was born in Haiti, is in the National Soccer Hall of Fame.
