= Adriana Venegas =

Costa Rican footballer (born 1989)

Personal information
- Full name: Adriana Pamela Venegas Morales
- Date of birth: 12 June 1989 (age 37)
- Place of birth: Costa Rica
- Height: 1.74 m (5 ft 9 in)
- Position: Forward

Senior career*
Years	Team	Apps	(Gls)
- CS Herediano

International career^{‡}
2007–2015	Costa Rica	10	(5)
- * Club domestic league appearances and goals ‡ National team caps and goals as of 17:56, 18 June 2015 (UTC)

Adriana Pamela Venegas Morales (born 12 June 1989) is a Costa Rican footballer who plays as a forward. She represented Costa Rica at the 2015 FIFA Women's World Cup.

== Personal life ==
Adriana's sister Carolina was also a forward in the Costa Rican team at the 2015 FIFA Women's World Cup. Adriana was the only mother in the squad, her daughter is named Isabella.
