= Pensativo Stadium =

Stadium in Antigua Guatemala

Coordinates: 14°34′03″N 90°44′17″W

Estadio Pensativo
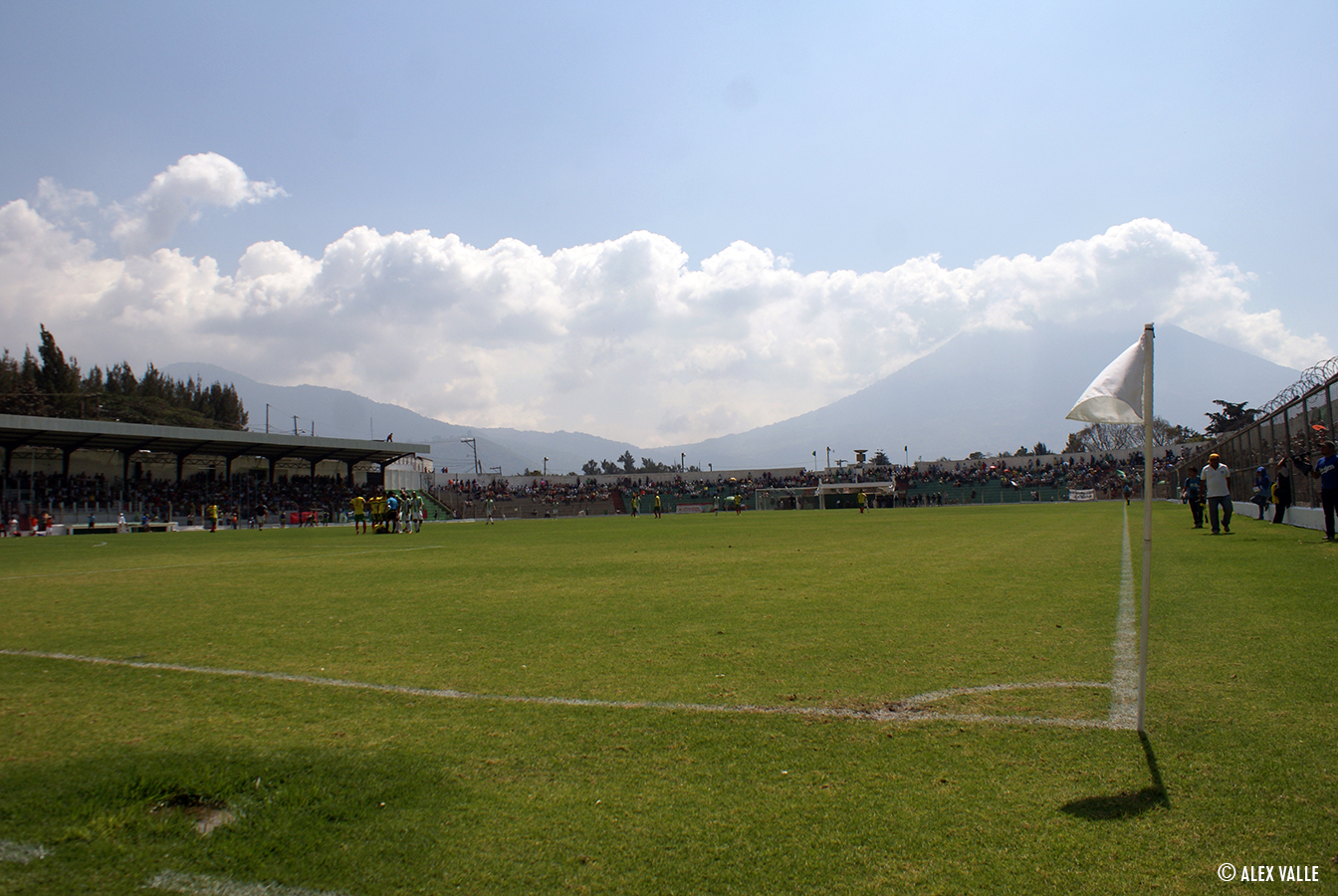
- Interactive map of Estadio Pensativo
- Location: Antigua Guatemala, Guatemala
- Owner: Municipality of Antigua Guatemala
- Capacity: 10,000 List: 9,000 (1959–2021)
- Surface: Grass
- Field size: 104 m × 68 m (341 ft × 223 ft)

Construction
- Opened: 1959
- Renovated: 2020–2021

Tenants
- Antigua GFC (1959–present); Guatemala national football team (selected matches)

Pensativo Stadium (Spanish: Estadio Pensativo) is a football stadium in Antigua Guatemala, Guatemala. The venue is home to Liga Nacional club Antigua (Panzas Verdes), and has a maximum capacity of 10,000 spectators.

The stadium is also the home of women's first division club Santiago de los Caballeros, and in 2011 it hosted three matches of the 2011 CONCACAF U-17 Championship qualification between Panama, Honduras, and Guatemala.

In 2020, the stadium received an upgrade so it can host CONCACAF matches, as well as matches of the Guatemala national football team.

== See also ==
- Lists of stadiums
