= 2010 CONCACAF Women's World Cup Qualifying =

Coordinates: 21°08′N 86°49′W

CONCACAF / FIFA Women's World Cup Qualifiers

Tournament details
- Host country: Mexico
- Dates: 28 October – 8 November
- Teams: 8 (from 1 confederation)
- Venues: 2 (in 1 host city)

Final positions
- Champions: Canada (2nd title)
- Runners-up: Mexico
- Third place: United States
- Fourth place: Costa Rica

Tournament statistics
- Matches played: 16
- Goals scored: 62 (3.88 per match)
- Top scorer(s): (United States) Abby Wambach (8 goals)

The 2010 CONCACAF Women's World Cup Qualifying was the eighth edition of the CONCACAF W Championship, the quadrennial international women's football championship contested by the senior women's national teams of the member associations of CONCACAF, the regional governing body of North America, Central America, and the Caribbean. Serving as the region's 2011 FIFA Women's World Cup Qualifiers, it was played by eight teams from 28 October to 8 November 2010 in Cancún, Mexico. For the second time in its history, it was won by Canada.

The United States, Canada and Mexico received byes into the tournament after taking the top three positions in the 2006 Gold Cup, while five other spots were determined through regional qualification.

Canada and Mexico, by virtue of their semi-final wins, qualified automatically for the 2011 Women's World Cup, while third-place USA advanced to a play-off against Italy for a further finals berth. Also, Costa Rica and Trinidad and Tobago qualified at the 2011 Pan American Games.

Canada won the tournament with a 1–0 win over Mexico in the Final. Just like during their 1998 CONCACAF Women's Championship win, Canada did not concede a single goal against in the entire tournament. They scored 17 goals, while allowing none, to win their second CONCACAF Women's World Cup Qualifier. Contrasting Canada's success, the USA's semifinal loss to Mexico marked the first time ever that the USA did not win a World Cup qualifying match. It was also the first time that the USA failed to advance to a CONCACAF final match, having not participated in the 1998 Championship because they qualified automatically as hosts for the 1999 Women’s World Cup.

== Qualification ==
=== North America ===
Direct entry:

- United States (Title Holder)
- Canada (Runner-up)
- Mexico (Host)

=== Central America ===
Via qualification:

- Guatemala (Winner Central American Triangular A)
- Costa Rica (Winner Central American Triangular B)

=== Caribbean ===
Via qualification:

- Trinidad and Tobago (Winner Caribbean qualifying Group F)
- Haiti (Winner Caribbean qualifying Group G)
- Guyana (Winner Caribbean play-off)

== Venues ==
Matches were played at Estadio de Béisbol Beto Ávila and Estadio Quintana Roo in Cancún.

2010 CONCACAF Women's World Cup Qualifying is located in Mexico
2010 CONCACAF Women's World Cup Qualifying is located in Mexico	Cancún	
2010 CONCACAF Women's World Cup Qualifying is located in Mexico	Estadio de Béisbol Beto Ávila	Estadio Quintana Roo
2010 CONCACAF Women's World Cup Qualifying is located in Mexico	Capacity: 9,500	Capacity: 18,844

== Group stage ==
Tie-breaking criteria for group stage ranking
The ranking of teams in each group was determined by the points obtained in all group matches. If two or more teams were equal on points, the following criteria were used to determine the ranking:
1. Most points obtained in the group matches played between the teams concerned;
2. Superior goal difference in the group matches played between the teams concerned;
3. Most goals scored in the group matches played between the teams concerned;

If, after having applied criteria a to c, teams still had an equal ranking, criteria a to c were reapplied exclusively to the matches between the teams who were still level to determine their final rankings. (Note: When there were two or more teams tied on points, criteria a to c were applied. After these criteria were applied, they may have defined the position of some of the teams involved, but not all of them. For example, if there was a three-way tie on points, the application of the first three criteria may only have broken the tie for one of the teams, leaving the other two teams still tied. In this case, the tiebreaking procedure was resumed, from the beginning, for those teams that were still tied.) If this procedure did not lead to a decision, criteria d to h applied.

4. Superior goal difference in all group matches;
5. Most goals scored in all group matches;
6. Drawing of lots.

=== Group A ===
Team	Pld	W	D	L	GF	GA	GD	Pts
Canada	3	3	0	0	12	0	+12	9
Mexico	3	2	0	1	9	5	+4	6
Trinidad and Tobago	3	1	0	2	4	4	0	3
Guyana	3	0	0	3	3	19	−16	0

29 October 2010
17:00 UTC-5

Trinidad and Tobago	0–1	Canada
	Report	Tancredi 63'

Estadio de Béisbol Beto Ávila, Cancún
Attendance: 250
Referee: Kari Seitz (USA)
29 October 2010
19:30 UTC-5

Mexico	7–2	Guyana
Garza 2', 45'; Dominguez 24', 36' (pen.), 67', 79'; Worbis 59'	Report	El-Masri 34'; De Souza 39'

Estadio de Béisbol Beto Ávila, Cancún
Attendance: 6,500
Referee: Yesli Sarai Rivas (El Salvador)

31 October 2010
17:00 UTC-6

Canada	8–0	Guyana
Julien 15'; Sinclair 34', 50', 63', 75'; Filigno 46', 75'; Lang 90'	Report

Estadio de Béisbol Beto Ávila, Cancún
Attendance: 482
Referee: Sabina Charles-Kirton (Saint Lucia)
31 October 2010
19:30 UTC-6

Mexico	2–0	Trinidad and Tobago
Dominguez 45'; Lopez 58'	Report

Estadio de Béisbol Beto Ávila, Cancún
Attendance: 8,250
Referee: Irazema Aguilera (Cuba)

2 November 2010
17:00 UTC-6

Guyana	1–4	Trinidad and Tobago
El-Masri 60'	Report	Cordner 11'; Belgrave 25'; Edwards 49'; Mascall 65'

Estadio de Béisbol Beto Ávila, Cancún
Attendance: 8,850
Referee: Gillian Martindale (Barbados)
2 November 2010
19:30 UTC-6

Mexico	0–3	Canada
	Report	Chapman 20'; Belanger 45'; Filigno 66'

Estadio de Béisbol Beto Ávila, Cancún
Attendance: 8,850
Referee: Kari Seitz (USA)

=== Group B ===
Team	Pld	W	D	L	GF	GA	GD	Pts
United States	3	3	0	0	18	0	+18	9
Costa Rica	3	2	0	1	4	4	0	6
Haiti	3	1	0	2	1	8	−7	3
Guatemala	3	0	0	3	0	11	−11	0

28 October 2010
17:00 UTC-5

Costa Rica	1–0	Guatemala
A. Venegas 51'	Report

Estadio Quintana Roo, Cancún
Attendance: 550
Referee: Quetzalli Alvarado (Mexico)
28 October 2010
19:30 UTC-5

United States	5–0	Haiti
Buehler 9'; Wambach 15', 45', 62'; Rodriguez 40'	Report

Estadio Quintana Roo, Cancún
Attendance: 2,500
Referee: Carol Chenard (Canada)

30 October 2010
17:00 UTC-5

Haiti	0–3	Costa Rica
	Report	Cruz 35'; Rodríguez 42', 52'

Estadio Quintana Roo, Cancún
Attendance: 456
Referee: Dianne Ferreira-James (Guyana)
30 October 2010
19:30 UTC-5

United States	9–0	Guatemala
Rodriguez 20', 45', 89'; Rapinoe 22', 40'; Wambach 29', 30'; Morgan 49'; Lloyd 58' (pen.)	Report

Estadio Quintana Roo, Cancún
Attendance: 1,050
Referee: Shane Da Silva (Trinidad and Tobago)

1 November 2010
17:00 UTC-6

Guatemala	0–1	Haiti
	Report	Saintilmond 22'

Estadio Quintana Roo, Cancún
Attendance: 100
Referee: Cardella Samuels (Jamaica)
1 November 2010
19:30 UTC-6

United States	4–0	Costa Rica
Wambach 32' (pen.); Cheney 69'; Averbuch 73'; Morgan 81'	Report

Estadio Quintana Roo, Cancún
Attendance: 502
Referee: Lucila Venegas (Mexico)

== Knockout stage ==
=== Bracket ===
Semi-finals
5 November – Cancún (Beto Ávila)
Canada	4
Costa Rica	0
5 November – Cancún (Beto Ávila)
United States	1
Mexico	2

Final
8 November – Cancún (Quintana Roo)
Canada	1
Mexico	0
Third place play-off
8 November – Cancún (Quintana Roo)
Costa Rica	0
United States	4

=== Semifinals ===
Winners qualified for 2011 FIFA Women's World Cup.

5 November 2010
17:00 UTC-6

Canada	4–0	Costa Rica
Bélanger 62'; Filigno 72'; Sinclair 75'; Cruz 90+3' (o.g.)	Report

Estadio de Béisbol Beto Ávila, Cancún
Attendance: 2,000
Referee: Shane De Silva (Trinidad and Tobago)

5 November 2010
20:00 UTC-6

United States	1–2	Mexico
Lloyd 25'	Report	Domínguez 3'; Pérez 26'

Estadio de Béisbol Beto Ávila, Cancún
Attendance: 8,364
Referee: Dianne Ferreira-James (Guyana)

=== Third place play-off ===
Winner advanced to UEFA–CONCACAF play-off.

8 November 2010
17:00 UTC-6

Costa Rica	0–3	United States
	Report	Cheney 17'; Wambach 33', 50'

Estadio Quintana Roo, Cancún
Attendance: 2,806
Referee: Quetzalli Alvarado (Mexico)

=== Final ===
8 November 2010
21:00

Canada	1–0	Mexico
Sinclair 53' (pen.)	Report

Estadio Quintana Roo, Cancún
Attendance: 16,005
Referee: Shane De Silva (Trinidad and Tobago)

== Goalscorers ==
There were 62 goals scored in 16 matches, for an average of 3.88 goals per match.

8 goals

- (United States) Abby Wambach

6 goals

- (Canada) Christine Sinclair
- (Mexico) Maribel Dominguez

4 goals

- (Canada) Jonelle Filigno
- (United States) Amy Rodriguez

2 goals

- (Canada) Josée Bélanger
- (Costa Rica) Raquel Rodríguez Cedeño
- (Guyana) Mariam El-Masri
- (Mexico) Dinora Garza
- (United States) Lauren Cheney
- (United States) Megan Rapinoe

1 goal

- (Canada) Candace-Marie Chapman
- (Canada) Christina Julien
- (Canada) Kara Lang
- (Canada) Melissa Tancredi
- (Costa Rica) Adriana Venegas
- (Costa Rica) Shirley Cruz Traña
- (Guyana) Kayla De Souza
- (Haiti) Adeline Saintilmond
- (Mexico) Guadalupe Worbis
- (Trinidad and Tobago) Candace Edwards
- (Trinidad and Tobago) Dernell Mascall
- (Trinidad and Tobago) Kennya Cordner
- (Trinidad and Tobago) Rhea Belgrave
- (United States) Alex Morgan
- (United States) Rachel Buehler
- (United States) Yael Averbuch

1 own goal

- (Costa Rica) Daniela Cruz (against Canada)
