= Guyana women's national football team =

Guyana
- Nickname: Lady Jags
- Association: Guyana Football Federation
- Confederation: CONCACAF (North America)
- Head coach: Omar Khan
- Home stadium: Providence Stadium
- FIFA code: GUY
First colours	Second colours

FIFA ranking
- Current: 91 ▲2 (16 June 2026)
- Highest: 76 (March 2017)
- Lowest: 93 (December 2025)

First international
- Trinidad and Tobago 9–0 Guyana (Macoya, Trinidad and Tobago; 7 August 1998)

Biggest win
- Dominica 0–9 Guyana (Paramaribo, Suriname; 29 November 2023)

Biggest defeat
- Trinidad and Tobago 9–0 Guyana (Macoya, Trinidad and Tobago; 7 August 1998)

The Guyana women's national football team is controlled by the Guyana Football Federation. Although the former British colony is located in South America, it competes in CONCACAF.

== Team image ==
=== Nicknames ===
The Guyana women's national football team has been known or nicknamed as the "Lady Jags".

=== Home stadium ===
Guyana play its home matches on the Providence National Stadium.

== Results and fixtures ==
The following is a list of match results in the last 12 months, as well as any future matches that have been scheduled.

Legend

Win Draw Loss Fixture

=== 2025 ===
1 December 2025 2026 CONCACAF W Championship Q	Guyana	1–3	Nicaragua	West Coast Demerara
20:00 UTC−4	Vincent 18'	Report (FIFA); Report (CONCACAF)	Flores 3'; Márquez 35'; Aguilar 49'	Stadium: Leonora National Track & Field Center; Referee: Diana Pérez (Mexico)

=== 2026 ===
27 February 2026 CONCACAF W Championship Q	Guyana	3–0	Dominica	West Coast Demerara
20:00 UTC−4	Charles 8'; Ritchie 75'; Johnson 77'	Report (FIFA); Report (CONCACAF)		Stadium: Leonora National Track & Field Center; Referee: Miriam Leon Serpas (El Salvador)

18 April 2026 CONCACAF W Championship Q	Jamaica	v	Guyana	Jamaica

== Players ==
=== Current squad ===
- The following players were named to the squad to play the 2026 CONCACAF W Championship qualification games against Nicaragua on 1 December 2025.

No.	Pos.	Player	Date of birth (age)	Caps	Club
	GK	Raven Edwards-Dowdall	14 May 2000 (age 26)		(Canada) North Toronto Nitros
	GK	Deekola Chester	4 April 2003 (age 23)		Guyana Police Force FC
	GK	Deena Fredericks	16 August 2006 (age 20)		Guyana Police Force FC
	DF	Rylee Traicoff	9 November 2001 (age 24)		(Canada) Simcoe County Rovers FC
	DF	Kristen Bettencourt	24 February 1996 (age 30)		(Canada) Pickering FC
	MF	Glengie Lewis	16 December 2003 (age 22)		(Guyana) Defence Force
	DF	Anika Sproxton	11 January 2005 (age 21)		(United States) Northwestern State Demons
	DF	Savannah Singh	2004 (age 21–22)		(United States) Catawba College
	DF	Hope Windebank	17 February 2004 (age 22)		(Canada) Pickering FC
	DF	Savanna Mondesir-Singh	6 January 2003 (age 23)		(United States) Christian Brothers Lady Bucs
	MF	Brianne Desa	6 July 2000 (age 26)		(Canada) Pickering FC
	MF	Dylana Makarowski	26 February 2003 (age 23)		(Canada) York Lions
	MF	Hannah Baptiste	3 January 1993 (age 33)		(England) Sutton United F.C.
	MF	Liyah Menilek	22 January 2006 (age 20)		(United States) Missouri State Bears
	MF	Sandra Johnson	2 January 2005 (age 21)		(Guyana) Defence Force
	MF	Glengy Lewis			(Guyana) Defence Force
	MF	Samantha Banfield	17 February 2004 (age 22)		(Canada) York Lions
	FW	Lakeisha Pearson	20 December 1994 (age 31)		Guyana Police Force FC
	MF	Masani Springer	21 December 2002 (age 23)		(England) Huddersfield Town A.F.C. Women
	FW	Serena McDonald	1 August 2002 (age 24)		(Canada) Centennial Colts
	FW	Annalisa Vincent	31 December 1999 (age 26)		(United States) Talladega Tornadoes
	FW	Otesha Charles	14 September 1993 (age 33)		(England) Chatham Town
	FW	Adelina Ritchie			(United States) Gwinnett Soccer Association

=== Recent call ups ===
No.	Pos.	Player	Date of birth (age)	Caps	Club

=== Previous squads ===
CONCACAF W Championship

- 2010 CONCACAF Women's World Cup Qualifying squad

== Competitive record ==
=== FIFA Women's World Cup ===
FIFA Women's World Cup record
Year	Result	GP	W	D*	L	GF	GA	GD
(China) 1991 to (United States) 1999	Did not exist							
(United States) 2003	Did not enter							
(China) 2007	Did not enter							
(Germany) 2011	Did not qualify							
(Canada) 2015	Did not enter							
(France) 2019	Did not qualify							
(Australia) (New Zealand) 2023	Did not qualify							
(Brazil) 2027	Did not qualify							
(Costa Rica) (Jamaica) (Mexico) (United States) 2031	To be determined							
(United Kingdom) 2035	To be determined							
Total	–	–	–	–	–	–	–	–

*Draws include knockout matches decided on penalty kicks.

=== Olympic Games ===
Summer Olympics record									Qualifying record					
Year	Round	Position	Pld	W	D*	L	GF	GA	Pld	W	D*	L	GF	GA
(United States) 1996	Did not exist								1995 FIFA WWC					
(Australia) 2000	Did not exist								1999 FIFA WWC					
(Greece) 2004	Did not enter								Did not enter					
(China) 2008	Did not enter								Did not enter					
(United Kingdom) 2012	Did not enter								Did not enter					
(Brazil) 2016	Did not qualify								7	3	1	3	14	14
(Japan) 2020	Did not enter								Did not enter					
(France) 2024	Did not qualify								2022 CONCACAF W Championship					
(United States) 2028	To be determined								2026 CONCACAF W Championship					
Total	–	–	–	–	–	–	–	–	7	3	1	3	14	14

*Draws include knockout matches decided on penalty kicks.

=== CONCACAF W Championship ===
CONCACAF W Championship record									Qualification record						
Year	Result	GP	W	D*	L	GF	GA	GD	GP	W	D*	L	GF	GA	GD
(Haiti) 1991 to (Canada) 1994	Did not exist								Did not exist						
(Canada) 1998	Did not qualify								2	0	0	2	1	15	-14
(United States) 2000	Did not enter								Did not enter						
(Canada) (United States) 2002	Withdrew								Withdrew						
(United States) 2006	Withdrew								Withdrew						
(Mexico) 2010	Group Stage	3	0	0	3	3	19	−16	7	5	0	2	17	5	+12
(United States) 2014	Did not enter								2014 Caribbean Cup						
(United States) 2018	Did not qualify								3	1	2	0	8	3	+5
(Mexico) 2022	Did not qualify								4	2	2	0	13	2	+11
(United States) 2026	Did not qualify								4	2	0	2	8	5	+3
Total	Group Stage	3	0	0	3	3	19	−16	20	10	4	6	47	30	+17

*Draws include knockout matches decided on penalty kicks.

=== CONCACAF W Gold Cup ===
CONCACAF W Gold Cup record								Qualification record							
Year	Result	GP	W	D*	L	GF	GA	Division	Group	GP	W	D*	L	GF	GA
(United States) 2024	Did not qualify							B	A	7	5	0	2	20	3
(N/A) 2029	To be determined							To be determined							
Total	–	–	–	–	–	–	–	–	–	7	5	0	2	20	3

*Draws include knockout matches decided on penalty kicks.

=== CFU Women's Caribbean Cup ===
CFU Women's Caribbean Cup record
Year	Result	Pld	W	D*	L	GF	GA
(Haiti) 2000	Did not enter						
(Trinidad and Tobago) 2014	Did not enter						
(Trinidad and Tobago) 2018	N/A	3	0	2	1	3	5
Total	–	3	0	2	1	3	5

*Draws include knockout matches decided on penalty kicks.
