= Guatemala women's national football team =

Women's association football team

Guatemala
- Nickname(s): Las Chapinas (The Chapinas) Azul y Blanca (Blue and White) La Bicolor(The Bicolor)
- Association: Federación Nacional de Fútbol de Guatemala
- Confederation: CONCACAF (North America)
- Sub-confederation: UNCAF (Central America)
- Head coach: Karla Maya
- Captain: Ana Lucía Martínez
- Most caps: Ana Lucía Martínez (40)
- Top scorer: Ana Lucía Martínez (21)
- Home stadium: Estadio Cementos Progreso
- FIFA code: GUA
First colours	Second colours

FIFA ranking
- Current: 83 ▲1 (16 June 2026)
- Highest: 70 (March 2017)
- Lowest: 87 (November 2010)

First international
- Guatemala 11–0 Honduras (Guatemala City, Guatemala; 19 July 1998)

Biggest win
- Guatemala 18–0 Belize (Guatemala City, Guatemala; 19 November 2003)

Biggest defeat
- China 14–0 Guatemala (Massachusetts, United States; 24 June 2000)

CONCACAF Women's Championship
- Appearances: 4 (first in 1998)
- Best result: 4th place (1998)

The Guatemala women's national football team (Spanish: selección femenina de fútbol de Guatemala) is controlled by the Federación Nacional de Fútbol de Guatemala. They are one of the top women's national football teams in the Central American region along with Costa Rica, having won the 1999 UNCAF championship.

== History ==
Following the creation of the first national women's league in 1997, a Guatemala women's national team was formed and in 1998 it began playing official international matches, the first of which was an 11–0 win against Honduras on 19 July 1998. After two more wins against El Salvador and Haiti, Guatemala advanced to the final qualification tournament to the 1999 Women's World Cup, where they finished fourth.

In June 1999 the first UNCAF Women's Championship was celebrated in Guatemala City, where after wins against Honduras and Nicaragua and a draw against Costa Rica, the host team won the title by beating the latter 2–0 in the final, in front of 12,000 spectators at the Estadio Mateo Flores. Guatemala captain Magnolia Pérez was the top scorer and best player of the tournament. Guatemala was invited to the 2000 Women's Gold Cup, where they lost all three first round matches against China, Mexico, and Canada.

At the 2001 Central American Games in home soil, Guatemala won their first round group but was then eliminated on penalty kicks in a semi final against Honduras, after which Guatemala beat El Salvador for the bronze medal.

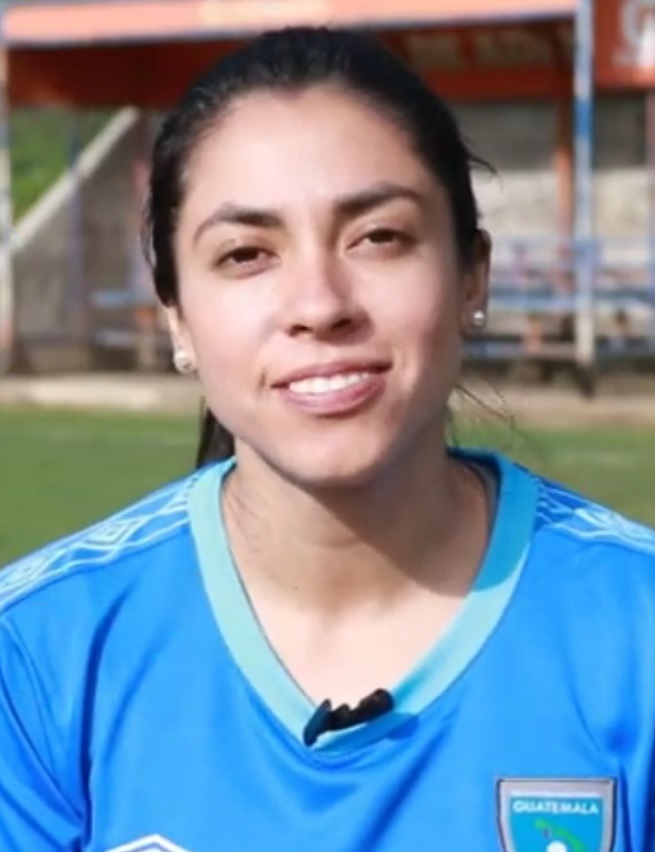
Ana Lucía Martínez made her debut for Guatemala in 2009

Guatemala entered qualification to the 2004 Olympic Games, where they earned a place in the final qualification tournament after beating Belize and drawing against Panama in the first round in November 2003, but its participation in the competition was halted and the team was replaced by Panama, as FIFA banned Guatemala from all international competitions in January 2004 until February 2004. Between 2004 and 2010, the Guatemala women's team's participation in international competitions was very scarce, with only two competitive matches played, both in 2006 during qualification to the 2006 Women's Gold Cup.

In 2010 Guatemala won the bronze medal at the 2010 Central American and Caribbean Games in Mayagüez, Puerto Rico, with a 2 wins, 1 draw, and 2 losses record. Later that year, Guatemala participated at the IV Women's Gold Cup, losing all three of their first round matches, against Costa Rica, the United States, and Haiti.

Guatemala hosted the 2012 Central American Pre-Olympic tournament, where they narrowly advanced to the final stage, finishing second behind Costa Rica after beating El Salvador 2–1. At the final qualification tournament in Vancouver, Guatemala lost to Mexico and the United States and beat the Dominican Republic, finishing third in their group and eliminated from the 2012 Olympic Tournament.

== Results and fixtures ==
The following is a list of match results in the last 12 months, as well as any future matches that have been scheduled.

Legend

Win Draw Lose Fixture

=== 2025 ===
1 December 2025 2026 CONCACAF W Championship Q	Guatemala	4–1	Bermuda	Guatemala City
19:00 UTC−6	Monterroso 5', 61'; Polanco 15'; Martínez 77' (pen.)	Report (FIFA); Report (CONCACAF)	Frazzoni 78'	Stadium: Estadio Cementos Progreso

- Guatemala Results and Fixtures – Soccerway.com
- Guatemala Results and Fixtures – FIFA.com

== Players ==
=== Current squad ===
The following players were named to the squad for the 2026 CONCACAF W Championship qualification matches in December 2025.

Caps and goals updated as of December 2025 after the match against Puerto Rico.

No.	Pos.	Player	Date of birth (age)	Caps	Goals	Club
1	GK	Isabella Andrino			0	(United States Soccer Federation) CSUN Women's Soccer
12	GK	Angie Hidalgo	7 November 1997 (age 28)	0	0	(National Football Federation of Guatemala) Huehuetecas
2	DF	Anayeli Quintanilla				(National Football Federation of Guatemala) Huehuetecas FC
3	DF	Michelle Ruano	6 July 1990 (age 36)			(National Football Federation of Guatemala) Doña Blanca
4	DF	Acacia Edwards	4 January 2004 (age 22)			(National Football Federation of Guatemala) Municipal Femenino
5	DF	Samantha López	16 April 2003 (age 23)			(Mexican Football Federation) Guadalajara
6	DF	Sorsha Herrera				(National Football Federation of Guatemala) Cremas Femenino
13	DF	Sandra Ovando	20 July 2003 (age 23)			(United States Soccer Federation) Southwestern Christian University
7	MF	Nathalia López	30 March 2001 (age 25)			(National Football Federation of Guatemala) Unifut Antigua
8	MF	Elizabeth Estrada	20 November 2003 (age 22)			(United States Soccer Federation) La Salle University
9	MF	Jezmin Castellanos				(United States Soccer Federation) West Texas A&M
10	MF	Jemery Myvett	2 March 2004 (age 22)			(Albanian Football Federation) KFF Vllaznia
11	MF	Madelyn Ventura	13 February 1997 (age 29)			(National Football Federation of Guatemala) Xelajú MC
16	MF	María Contreras	8 November 1998 (age 27)			(National Football Federation of Guatemala) United FC
17	MF	Dina Polanco	23 January 2006 (age 20)			(United States Soccer Federation) University of Mary Marauders
18	MF	Betzael Contreras	20 December 2005 (age 20)			(United States Soccer Federation) Miami Dade College
19	FW	María Monterroso	30 November 1993 (age 32)			(Mexican Football Federation) Dynamo de Guadalajara
20	FW	Ana Lucía Martínez	8 January 1990 (age 36)			(Mexican Football Federation) Cruz Azul
21	FW	Karen González	14 June 2005 (age 21)			(National Football Federation of Guatemala) Cuilco Femenino FC
22	FW	Waleska Franco				(National Football Federation of Guatemala) Municipal

=== Recent call-ups ===
Pos.	Player	Date of birth (age)	Caps	Goals	Club	Latest call-up

== Competitive record ==
=== FIFA Women's World Cup ===
FIFA Women's World Cup record
Year	Result	GP	W	D*	L	GF	GA
(China) 1991	Did not enter						
(Sweden) 1995	Did not enter						
(United States) 1999	Did not qualify						
(United States) 2003	Did not qualify						
(China) 2007	Did not qualify						
(Germany) 2011	Did not qualify						
(Canada) 2015	Did not qualify						
(France) 2019	Suspended by FIFA						
(Australia) (New Zealand) 2023	Did not qualify						
(Brazil) 2027	Did not qualify						
(Costa Rica) (Jamaica) (Mexico) (United States) 2031	To be determined						
(United Kingdom) 2035	Did not qualify						
Total	–	–	–	–	–	–	–

*Draws include knockout matches decided on penalty kicks.

=== Olympic Games ===
Summer Olympics record									Qualifying record					
Year	Round	Position	Pld	W	D*	L	GF	GA	Pld	W	D*	L	GF	GA
(United States) 1996	Did not enter								1995 FIFA WWC					
(Australia) 2000	Did not qualify								1999 FIFA WWC					
(Greece) 2004	Did not qualify								2 (Note: After two match played, National Football Federation of Guatemala was suspended by CONCACAF and FIFA in January 2004.)	1	1	0	16	3
(China) 2008	Did not enter								did not enter					
(United Kingdom) 2012	Did not qualify								7	4	0	3	17	25
(Brazil) 2016	Did not qualify								6	2	0	4	7	17
(Japan) 2020	Did not qualify								2	1	0	1	5	3
(France) 2024	Did not qualify								2022 CONCACAF W Championship					
(United States) 2028	Did not qualify								2026 CONCACAF W Championship					
Total	–	–	–	–	–	–	–	–	17	8	1	8	45	48

*Draws include knockout matches decided on penalty kicks.

=== CONCACAF W Championship ===
CONCACAF W Championship record								Qualification record					
Year	Result	GP	W	D*	L	GF	GA	GP	W	D*	L	GF	GA
(Haiti) 1991	Did not enter							Did not enter					
(United States) 1993	Did not enter							Did not enter					
(Canada) 1994	Did not enter							Did not enter					
(Canada) 1998	Fourth Place	5	2	0	3	10	16	2	2	0	0	15	1
(United States) 2000	Group stage	3	0	0	3	0	33	3	2	1	0	16	4
(Canada) (United States) 2002	Did not qualify							4	2	0	2	8	8
(United States) 2006	Did not qualify							2	1	0	1	2	4
(Mexico) 2010	Group stage	3	0	0	3	0	11	2	2	0	0	7	2
(United States) 2014	Group stage	3	0	0	3	1	8	4	3	0	1	9	5
(United States) 2018	Suspended by FIFA							Suspended					
(Mexico) 2022	Did not qualify							4	2	0	2	16	7
(United States) 2026	Did not qualify							4	3	0	1	23	4
Total	Fourth Place	14	2	0	12	11	68	25	17	1	7	96	34

*Draws include knockout matches decided on penalty kicks.

=== CONCACAF W Gold Cup ===
CONCACAF W Gold Cup record								Qualification record							
Year	Result	GP	W	D*	L	GF	GA	Division	Group	GP	W	D*	L	GF	GA
(United States) 2024	Did not qualify							A	B	5	1	2	2	7	11
(N/A) 2029	To be determined							To be determined							
Total	–	–	–	–	–	–	–	–	–	5	1	2	2	7	11

*Draws include knockout matches decided on penalty kicks.

=== Pan American Games ===
Pan American Games record
Year	Result	Pld	W	D*	L	GF	GA
(Canada) 1999	Did not enter						
(Dominican Republic) 2003	Did not enter						
(Brazil) 2007	Did not enter						
(Mexico) 2011	Did not qualify						
(Canada) 2015	Did not qualify						
(Peru) 2019	Suspended by FIFA						
(Chile) 2023	Did not qualify						
Total	–	–	–	–	–	–	–

*Draws include knockout matches decided on penalty kicks.

=== Central American and Caribbean Games ===
Central American and Caribbean Games record
Year	Result	Pld	W	D*	L	GF	GA
(Puerto Rico) 2010	Bronze Medal	5	2	1	2	10	8
(Mexico) 2014	Did not enter						
(Colombia) 2018	Did not enter						
(El Salvador) 2023	Did not enter						
Total	Bronze Medal	5	2	1	2	10	8

*Draws include knockout matches decided on penalty kicks.

=== Central American Games ===
Central American Games record
Year	Result	Pld	W	D*	L	GF	GA
(Guatemala) 2001	Bronze Medal	4	3	1	0	21	2
(Costa Rica) 2013	Bronze Medal	4	3	0	1	15	9
(Nicaragua) 2017	Suspended by FIFA						
(El Salvador) 2022	Cancelled						
(Guatemala) 2025	Bronze Medal	4	1	2	1	5	3
Total	Bronze Medal	12	7	3	2	41	14

*Draws include knockout matches decided on penalty kicks.

== Honours ==
=== Regional ===
- Central American and Caribbean Games

Bronze Medalists (1): 2010

- Central American Games

Bronze Medalists (2): 2001, 2013

== See also ==
- Sport in Guatemala
  - Football in Guatemala
    - Women's football in Guatemala
- Guatemala men's national football team
