= El Salvador national football team records and statistics =

El Salvador association football records

The following are the El Salvador national football team statistical records.

== Player records ==
As of 26 March 2024
Players in bold are still active with El Salvador.

=== Most appearances ===
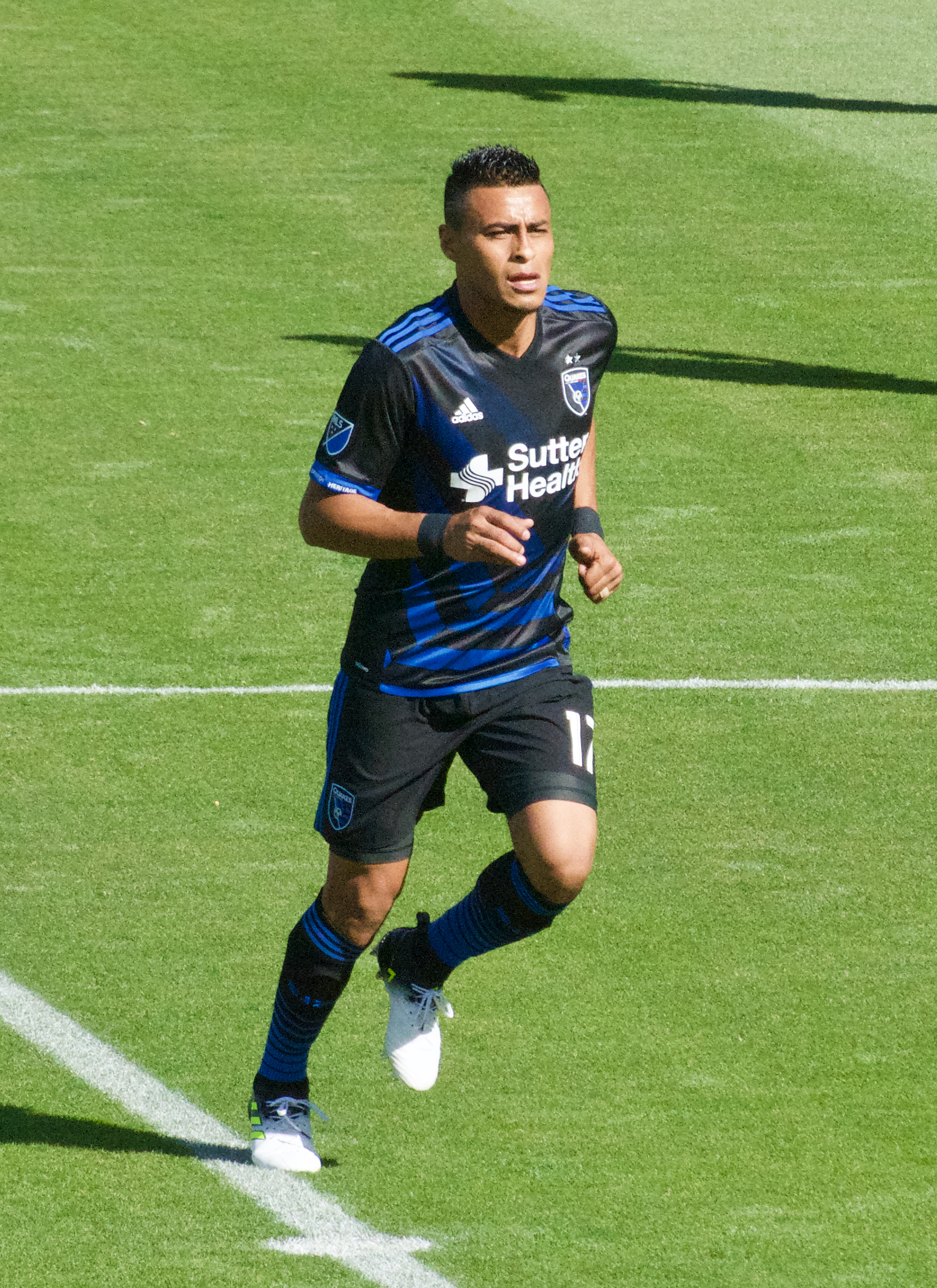
Darwin Cerén is El Salvador's most capped player with 90 appearances.

| Rank | Player | Caps | Goals | Career |
|---|---|---|---|---|
| 1 | **Darwin Cerén** | 93 | 5 | 2012–present |
| 2 | Alfredo Pacheco | 85 | 7 | 2002–2013 |
| 3 | Dennis Alas | 83 | 3 | 2001–2012 |
| 4 | Leonel Cárcamo | 82 | 0 | 1988–2000 |
| 5 | Marvin González | 81 | 1 | 2002–2011 |
| 6 | Rudis Corrales | 78 | 17 | 1999–2011 |
| 6 | **Alexander Larín** | 78 | 7 | 2012–present |
| 6 | Ramón Sánchez | 78 | 2 | 2003–2012 |
| 9 | Osael Romero | 77 | 16 | 2007–2013 |
| 10 | Guillermo Rivera | 76 | 15 | 1988–2000 |
| 10 | Jorge Rodríguez | 76 | 9 | 1995–2004 |

=== Top goalscorers ===
| Rank | Player | Goals | Caps | Ratio | Career |
|---|---|---|---|---|---|
| 1 | Raúl Díaz Arce | 39 | 72 | 0.54 | 1991–2000 |
| 2 | Rodolfo Zelaya | 23 | 52 | 0.44 | 2008–2019 |
| 3 | Jorge "Mágico" González | 21 | 62 | 0.34 | 1976–1998 |
| 4 | Juan Francisco Barraza | 19 | 40 | 0.48 | 1953–1969 |
| 4 | José María Rivas | 19 | 47 | 0.4 | 1979–1989 |
| 4 | **Nelson Bonilla** | 19 | 60 | 0.32 | 2012–present |
| 7 | Rudis Corrales | 17 | 78 | 0.22 | 2001–2011 |
| 8 | Luis Ramírez Zapata | 16 | 58 | 0.28 | 1971–1989 |
| 8 | Osael Romero | 16 | 77 | 0.21 | 2007–2013 |
| 10 | Miguel Cruz | 15 | 14 | 1.07 | 1935–1950 |
| 10 | Eliseo Quintanilla | 15 | 68 | 0.22 | 2006–2012 |
| 10 | Guillermo Rivera | 15 | 76 | 0.2 | 1988–2000 |

== Competition records ==
=== FIFA World Cup ===
El Salvador has never advanced beyond the first round of the finals competition. El Salvador declined to participate at the 1950 FIFA World Cup. (Note: El Salvador turned down an invitation from Brazil.)

| FIFA World Cup record | | | | | | | | | | Qualification record | | | | | |
| Year | Round | Position | Pld | W | D | L | GF | GA | Squad | Pld | W | D | L | GF | GA |
|---|---|---|---|---|---|---|---|---|---|---|---|---|---|---|---|
| (Uruguay) 1930 | Not a FIFA member | | | | | | | | | Not a FIFA member | | | | | |
| (Italy) 1934 | Not a FIFA member | | | | | | | | | Not a FIFA member | | | | | |
| (France) 1938 | Did not enter | | | | | | | | | Did not enter | | | | | |
| (Brazil) 1950 | Withdrew | | | | | | | | | Withdrew | | | | | |
| (Switzerland) 1954 | Did not enter | | | | | | | | | Did not enter | | | | | |
| (Sweden) 1958 | Did not enter | | | | | | | | | Did not enter | | | | | |
| (Chile) 1962 | Did not enter | | | | | | | | | Did not enter | | | | | |
| (England) 1966 | Did not enter | | | | | | | | | Did not enter | | | | | |
| (Mexico) 1970 | Group stage | 16th | 3 | 0 | 0 | 3 | 0 | 9 | Squad | 10 | 7 | 0 | 3 | 19 | 12 |
| (West Germany) 1974 | Did not qualify | | | | | | | | | 2 | 0 | 0 | 2 | 0 | 2 |
| (Argentina) 1978 | Did not qualify | | | | | | | | | 11 | 4 | 4 | 3 | 18 | 16 |
| (Spain) 1982 | Group stage | 24th | 3 | 0 | 0 | 3 | 1 | 13 | Squad | 13 | 7 | 4 | 2 | 14 | 6 |
| (Mexico) 1986 | Did not qualify | | | | | | | | | 6 | 4 | 1 | 1 | 15 | 2 |
| (Italy) 1990 | Did not qualify | | | | | | | | | 8 | 2 | 2 | 4 | 8 | 8 |
| (United States) 1994 | Did not qualify | | | | | | | | | 14 | 8 | 1 | 5 | 28 | 11 |
| (France) 1998 | Did not qualify | | | | | | | | | 16 | 5 | 5 | 6 | 23 | 22 |
| (South Korea) (Japan) 2002 | Did not qualify | | | | | | | | | 10 | 6 | 1 | 3 | 23 | 15 |
| (Germany) 2006 | Did not qualify | | | | | | | | | 8 | 2 | 2 | 4 | 6 | 14 |
| (South Africa) 2010 | Did not qualify | | | | | | | | | 20 | 8 | 3 | 9 | 39 | 21 |
| (Brazil) 2014 | Did not qualify | | | | | | | | | 12 | 7 | 2 | 3 | 28 | 16 |
| (Russia) 2018 | Did not qualify | | | | | | | | | 10 | 3 | 3 | 4 | 12 | 16 |
| (Qatar) 2022 | Did not qualify | | | | | | | | | 20 | 7 | 5 | 8 | 27 | 19 |
| (Canada) (Mexico) (United States) 2026 | Qualification in progress | | | | | | | | | 2 | 1 | 1 | 0 | 3 | 1 |
| (Morocco) (Portugal) (Spain) 2030 | To be determined | | | | | | | | | To be determined | | | | | |
| (Saudi Arabia) 2034 | To be determined | | | | | | | | | To be determined | | | | | |
| Total | Group stage | 2/20 | 6 | 0 | 0 | 6 | 1 | 22 | — | 162 | 71 | 34 | 57 | 263 | 181 |

=== CONCACAF Gold Cup ===
| CONCACAF Championship & Gold Cup record | | | | | | | | | | Qualification record | | | | | |
| Year | Round | Position | Pld | W | D | L | GF | GA | Squad | Pld | W | D | L | GF | GA |
|---|---|---|---|---|---|---|---|---|---|---|---|---|---|---|---|
| (El Salvador) 1963 | Runners-up | 2nd | 7 | 3 | 3 | 1 | 17 | 11 | Squad | Qualified as hosts | | | | | |
| (Guatemala) 1965 | Fourth place | 4th | 5 | 2 | 1 | 2 | 7 | 9 | Squad | 2 | 2 | 0 | 0 | 7 | 1 |
| (Honduras) 1967 | Did not enter | | | | | | | | | Did not enter | | | | | |
| (Costa Rica) 1969 | Banned | | | | | | | | | Banned | | | | | |
| (Trinidad and Tobago) 1971 | Withdrew | | | | | | | | | Withdrew | | | | | |
| (Haiti) 1973 | Did not qualify | | | | | | | | | 2 | 0 | 0 | 2 | 0 | 2 |
| (Mexico) 1977 | Third place | 3rd | 5 | 2 | 1 | 2 | 8 | 9 | Squad | 6 | 2 | 3 | 1 | 10 | 7 |
| (Honduras) 1981 | Runners-up | 2nd | 5 | 2 | 2 | 1 | 2 | 1 | Squad | 8 | 5 | 2 | 1 | 12 | 5 |
| 1985 | Fourth place | 4th | 4 | 2 | 1 | 1 | 7 | 2 | Squad | 2 | 2 | 0 | 0 | 8 | 0 |
| 1989 | Fifth place | 5th | 6 | 0 | 2 | 4 | 2 | 8 | Squad | 2 | 2 | 0 | 0 | 6 | 0 |
| (United States) 1991 | Did not qualify | | | | | | | | | 5 | 2 | 1 | 2 | 7 | 11 |
| (Mexico) (United States) 1993 | Did not qualify | | | | | | | | | 3 | 0 | 1 | 2 | 1 | 5 |
| (United States) 1996 | Group stage | 6th | 2 | 1 | 0 | 1 | 3 | 4 | Squad | 4 | 3 | 0 | 1 | 7 | 3 |
| (United States) 1998 | Group stage | 8th | 3 | 0 | 1 | 2 | 0 | 6 | Squad | 5 | 1 | 1 | 3 | 2 | 5 |
| (United States) 2000 | Did not qualify | | | | | | | | | 8 | 1 | 2 | 5 | 6 | 15 |
| (United States) 2002 | Quarter-finals | 8th | 3 | 1 | 0 | 2 | 1 | 5 | Squad | 6 | 2 | 4 | 0 | 8 | 4 |
| (Mexico) (United States) 2003 | Quarter-finals | 6th | 3 | 1 | 0 | 2 | 3 | 7 | Squad | 5 | 3 | 0 | 2 | 6 | 4 |
| (United States) 2005 | Did not qualify | | | | | | | | | 2 | 0 | 0 | 2 | 1 | 3 |
| (United States) 2007 | Group stage | 9th | 3 | 1 | 0 | 2 | 2 | 6 | Squad | 5 | 2 | 1 | 2 | 4 | 5 |
| (United States) 2009 | Group stage | 9th | 3 | 1 | 0 | 2 | 2 | 3 | Squad | 5 | 1 | 1 | 3 | 5 | 8 |
| (United States) 2011 | Quarter-finals | 7th | 4 | 1 | 2 | 1 | 8 | 8 | Squad | 5 | 2 | 1 | 2 | 7 | 6 |
| (United States) 2013 | Quarter-finals | 7th | 4 | 1 | 1 | 2 | 4 | 8 | Squad | 4 | 1 | 2 | 1 | 2 | 2 |
| (Canada) (United States) 2015 | Group stage | 9th | 3 | 0 | 2 | 1 | 1 | 2 | Squad | 4 | 2 | 0 | 2 | 4 | 3 |
| (United States) 2017 | Quarter-finals | 8th | 4 | 1 | 1 | 2 | 4 | 6 | Squad | 5 | 2 | 1 | 2 | 5 | 4 |
| (Costa Rica) (Jamaica) (United States) 2019 | Group stage | 9th | 3 | 1 | 1 | 1 | 1 | 4 | Squad | 4 | 3 | 0 | 1 | 7 | 2 |
| (United States) 2021 | Quarter-finals | 6th | 4 | 2 | 0 | 2 | 6 | 4 | Squad | 6 | 5 | 0 | 1 | 10 | 1 |
| (Canada) (United States) 2023 | Group stage | 14th | 3 | 0 | 2 | 1 | 3 | 4 | Squad | 4 | 1 | 2 | 1 | 6 | 5 |
| Total | Runners-up | 19/27 | 74 | 22 | 20 | 32 | 81 | 107 | — | 102 | 44 | 22 | 36 | 131 | 101 |

CONCACAF Championship & Gold Cup history
| First match | El Salvador 1–1 Panama (23 March 1963; San Salvador, El Salvador) |
| Biggest Win | El Salvador 6–1 Nicaragua (25 March 1963; San Salvador, El Salvador) El Salvador 6–1 Cuba (12 June 2011; Chicago, United States |
| Biggest Defeat | Mexico 5–0 El Salvador (5 June 2011; Arlington, United States) |
| Best Result | Runners-up (1963, 1981) |
| Worst Result | Group stage (1996, 1998, 2007, 2009, 2015, 2019, 2023, 2025) |

=== CONCACAF Nations League ===
CONCACAF Nations League record
| League | | | | | | | | | | Finals | | | | | | | | |
| Season | Division | Group | Pld | W | D | L | GF | GA | P/R | Year | Result | Pld | W | D | L | GF | GA | Squad |
|---|---|---|---|---|---|---|---|---|---|---|---|---|---|---|---|---|---|---|
| 2019–20 | B | B | 6 | 5 | 0 | 1 | 10 | 1 | ▲ | (United States) 2021 | Ineligible | | | | | | | |
| 2022–23 | A | D | 4 | 1 | 2 | 1 | 6 | 5 | Same position | (United States) 2023 | Did not qualify | | | | | | | |
| 2023–24 | A | A | 4 | 0 | 1 | 3 | 2 | 6 | ▼ | (United States) 2024 | Did not qualify | | | | | | | |
| 2024–25 | B | A | To be determined | | | | | | | 2025 | Ineligible | | | | | | | |
| Total | — | — | 14 | 6 | 3 | 5 | 18 | 12 | — | Total | 0 Titles | — | — | — | — | — | — | — |

CONCACAF Nations League history
| First match | El Salvador 3–0 Saint Lucia (7 September 2019; San Salvador, El Salvador) |
| Biggest Win | El Salvador 3–0 Saint Lucia (7 September 2019; San Salvador, El Salvador) |
| Biggest Defeat | Guatemala 2–0 El Salvador (7 September 2023; Guatemala City, Guatemala) |
| Best Result | — |
| Worst Result | — |

=== Copa Centroamericana ===
Copa Centroamericana record
| Year | Round | Position | Pld | W | D | L | GF | GA |
|---|---|---|---|---|---|---|---|---|
| (Costa Rica) 1991 | Fourth place | 4th | 3 | 0 | 1 | 2 | 2 | 9 |
| (Honduras) 1993 | Fourth place | 4th | 3 | 0 | 1 | 2 | 1 | 5 |
| (El Salvador) 1995 | Third place | 3rd | 4 | 2 | 0 | 2 | 5 | 5 |
| (Guatemala) 1997 | Third place | 3rd | 5 | 3 | 1 | 1 | 5 | 5 |
| (Costa Rica) 1999 | Fourth place | 4th | 5 | 1 | 1 | 3 | 3 | 9 |
| (Honduras) 2001 | Third place | 3rd | 6 | 2 | 4 | 0 | 8 | 4 |
| (Panama) 2003 | Third place | 3rd | 5 | 3 | 0 | 2 | 6 | 4 |
| (Guatemala) 2005 | Group stage | 6th | 2 | 0 | 0 | 2 | 1 | 3 |
| (El Salvador) 2007 | Fourth place | 4th | 5 | 2 | 1 | 2 | 4 | 5 |
| (Honduras) 2009 | Fourth place | 4th | 5 | 1 | 1 | 3 | 5 | 6 |
| (Panama) 2011 | Fourth place | 4th | 5 | 2 | 1 | 2 | 7 | 6 |
| (Costa Rica) 2013 | Third place | 3rd | 4 | 1 | 2 | 1 | 2 | 2 |
| (United States) 2014 | Fourth place | 4th | 4 | 2 | 0 | 2 | 4 | 3 |
| (Panama) 2017 | Third place | 3rd | 5 | 2 | 1 | 2 | 5 | 4 |
| Total | Third place | 14/14 | 57 | 19 | 14 | 24 | 54 | 67 |

=== CCCF Championship ===
CCCF Championship record
| Year | Round | Position | Pld | W | D | L | GF | GA |
|---|---|---|---|---|---|---|---|---|
| (Costa Rica) 1941 | Runners-up | 2nd | 4 | 2 | 1 | 1 | 15 | 8 |
| (El Salvador) 1943 | Champions | 1st | 6 | 4 | 1 | 1 | 28 | 11 |
| (Costa Rica) 1946 | Third place | 3rd | 5 | 3 | 0 | 2 | 15 | 11 |
| (Guatemala) 1948 | Fifth place | 5th | 8 | 2 | 1 | 5 | 6 | 17 |
| (Panama) 1951 | Did not enter | | | | | | | |
| (Costa Rica) 1953 | Fifth place | 5th | 6 | 2 | 1 | 3 | 10 | 14 |
| (Honduras) 1955 | Fourth place | 4th | 6 | 3 | 0 | 3 | 8 | 13 |
| (Netherlands Antilles) 1957 | Did not enter | | | | | | | |
| (Cuba) 1960 | Withdrew | | | | | | | |
| (Costa Rica) 1961 | Runners-up | 2nd | 6 | 4 | 1 | 1 | 18 | 7 |
| Total | 1 Title | 7/10 | 41 | 20 | 5 | 16 | 100 | 81 |

=== Olympic Games ===
Olympic Games record
| Year | Round | Position | Pld | W | D | L | GF | GA | Squad |
|---|---|---|---|---|---|---|---|---|---|
| (France) 1900 | Did not participate | | | | | | | | |
| (United States) 1904 | Did not participate | | | | | | | | |
| (United Kingdom) 1908 | Did not participate | | | | | | | | |
| (Sweden) 1912 | Did not participate | | | | | | | | |
| (Belgium) 1920 | Did not participate | | | | | | | | |
| (France) 1924 | Did not participate | | | | | | | | |
| (Netherlands) 1928 | Did not participate | | | | | | | | |
| (Nazi Germany) 1936 | Did not participate | | | | | | | | |
| (United Kingdom) 1948 | Did not participate | | | | | | | | |
| (Finland) 1952 | Did not participate | | | | | | | | |
| (Australia) 1956 | Did not participate | | | | | | | | |
| (Italy) 1960 | Did not participate | | | | | | | | |
| (Japan) 1964 | Did not participate | | | | | | | | |
| (Mexico) 1968 | Group stage | 15th | 3 | 0 | 1 | 2 | 2 | 8 | Squad |
| (West Germany) 1972 | Did not qualify | | | | | | | | |
| (Canada) 1976 | Did not qualify | | | | | | | | |
| (Soviet Union) 1980 | Did not qualify | | | | | | | | |
| (United States) 1984 | Did not qualify | | | | | | | | |
| (South Korea) 1988 | Did not qualify | | | | | | | | |
| Since 1992 | See El Salvador national under-23 football team | | | | | | | | |
| Total | Group stage | 1/19 | 3 | 0 | 1 | 2 | 2 | 8 | — |

=== Pan American Games ===
Pan American Games record
| Year | Round | Position | Pld | W | D | L | GF | GA |
|---|---|---|---|---|---|---|---|---|
| (Argentina) 1951 | Did not qualify | | | | | | | |
| (Mexico) 1955 | Did not qualify | | | | | | | |
| (United States) 1959 | Did not qualify | | | | | | | |
| (Brazil) 1963 | Did not qualify | | | | | | | |
| (Canada) 1967 | Did not qualify | | | | | | | |
| (Colombia) 1971 | Did not qualify | | | | | | | |
| (Mexico) 1975 | Preliminary round | 10th | 3 | 1 | 1 | 1 | 4 | 3 |
| (Puerto Rico) 1979 | Did not qualify | | | | | | | |
| (Venezuela) 1983 | Did not qualify | | | | | | | |
| (United States) 1987 | Preliminary round | 7th | 3 | 1 | 1 | 1 | 1 | 1 |
| (Cuba) 1991 | Did not qualify | | | | | | | |
| (Argentina) 1995 | Did not qualify | | | | | | | |
| Since 1999 | See El Salvador national under-23 football team | | | | | | | |
| Total | Preliminary round | 2/12 | 6 | 2 | 2 | 2 | 5 | 4 |

=== Central American and Caribbean Games ===
Central American and Caribbean Games record
| Year | Round | Position | Pld | W | D | L | GF | GA |
|---|---|---|---|---|---|---|---|---|
| (Cuba) 1930 | Fourth place | 4th | 5 | 1 | 0 | 4 | 13 | 25 |
| (El Salvador) 1935 | Third place | 3rd | 5 | 2 | 0 | 3 | 15 | 20 |
| (Panama) 1938 | Fourth place | 4th | 5 | 2 | 0 | 3 | 7 | 19 |
| (Colombia) 1946 | Did not qualify | | | | | | | |
| (Guatemala) 1950 | Fourth place | 4th | 3 | 1 | 0 | 2 | 4 | 5 |
| (Mexico) 1954 | Champions | 1st | 4 | 3 | 1 | 0 | 9 | 5 |
| (Venezuela) 1959 | Did not qualify | | | | | | | |
| (Jamaica) 1962 | Did not qualify | | | | | | | |
| (Puerto Rico) 1966 | Fourth place | 4th | 5 | 1 | 2 | 2 | 5 | 9 |
| (Panama) 1970 | Did not qualify | | | | | | | |
| (Dominican Republic) 1974 | Did not qualify | | | | | | | |
| (Colombia) 1978 | Group stage | 9th | 5 | 1 | 0 | 4 | 2 | 21 |
| (Cuba) 1982 | Did not qualify | | | | | | | |
| (Dominican Republic) 1986 | Did not qualify | | | | | | | |
| (Mexico) 1990 | Did not qualify | | | | | | | |
| (Puerto Rico) 1993 | Did not qualify | | | | | | | |
| (Venezuela) 1998 | Did not qualify | | | | | | | |
| (El Salvador) 2002 | Champions | 1st | 5 | 5 | 0 | 0 | 10 | 1 |
| (Colombia) 2006 | Quarter-finals | 5th | 3 | 1 | 0 | 2 | 9 | 7 |
| (Puerto Rico) 2010 | Quarter-finals | 5th | 2 | 1 | 1 | 0 | 1 | 0 |
| (Mexico) 2014 | Group stage | 5th | 3 | 1 | 0 | 2 | 3 | 5 |
| (Colombia) 2018 | Group stage | 6th | 3 | 1 | 0 | 2 | 1 | 4 |
| Total | 2 Titles | 12/22 | 48 | 20 | 4 | 24 | 79 | 121 |

=== Central American Games ===
Central American Games record
| Year | Round | Position | Pld | W | D | L | GF | GA |
|---|---|---|---|---|---|---|---|---|
| (Guatemala) 1973 | Third place | 3rd | 4 | 1 | 2 | 1 | 2 | 4 |
| (El Salvador) 1977 | Champions | 1st | 6 | 4 | 1 | 1 | 17 | 2 |
| (Guatemala) 1986 | Fourth place | 4th | 3 | 0 | 1 | 2 | 0 | 4 |
| (Honduras) 1990 | Did not participate | | | | | | | |
| (El Salvador) 1994 | Runners-up | 2nd | 3 | 3 | 0 | 0 | 12 | 2 |
| (Honduras) 1997 | Fourth place | 4th | 4 | 2 | 0 | 2 | 5 | 2 |
| (Guatemala) 2001 | Group stage | 6th | 2 | 0 | 0 | 2 | 0 | 5 |
| (Honduras) 2006 | Not held | | | | | | | |
| (Panama) 2010 | Not held | | | | | | | |
| (Costa Rica) 2013 | Third place | 3rd | 6 | 2 | 0 | 4 | 6 | 23 |
| (Nicaragua) 2017 | Fourth place | 4th | 4 | 1 | 2 | 1 | 2 | 1 |
| Total | 1 Title | 9/11 | 32 | 13 | 6 | 13 | 44 | 43 |

== Head-to-head record ==
The list shown below shows the El Salvador national football team all-time international record against opposing nations. The stats are composed of FIFA World Cup and qualifiers, the CONCACAF Gold Cup, as well as numerous other international friendly tournaments and matches.

Updated to 5 October 2026 after the match against Martinique.

Positive Record Neutral Record Negative Record

| Opponent | Pld | W | D | L | GF | GA | GD |
|---|---|---|---|---|---|---|---|
| Anguilla | 3 | 3 | 0 | 0 | 19 | 0 | +19 |
| Antigua and Barbuda | 1 | 1 | 0 | 0 | 3 | 0 | +3 |
| Argentina | 3 | 0 | 0 | 3 | 0 | 7 | −7 |
| Armenia | 1 | 0 | 0 | 1 | 0 | 4 | −4 |
| Aruba | 1 | 1 | 0 | 0 | 2 | 0 | +2 |
| Barbados | 1 | 1 | 0 | 0 | 3 | 0 | +3 |
| Belgium | 2 | 0 | 0 | 2 | 0 | 4 | -4 |
| Belize | 9 | 9 | 0 | 0 | 26 | 6 | +20 |
| Bermuda | 5 | 2 | 1 | 2 | 8 | 6 | +2 |
| Bolivia | 5 | 1 | 2 | 2 | 6 | 9 | −3 |
| Bonaire | 3 | 2 | 1 | 0 | 4 | 2 | +2 |
| Brazil | 3 | 0 | 0 | 3 | 0 | 13 | −13 |
| Canada | 18 | 4 | 4 | 10 | 13 | 24 | −11 |
| Cayman Islands | 2 | 2 | 0 | 0 | 8 | 1 | +7 |
| Chile | 3 | 0 | 0 | 3 | 0 | 3 | −3 |
| China | 1 | 0 | 1 | 0 | 2 | 2 | 0 |
| Colombia | 8 | 1 | 2 | 5 | 9 | 18 | -9 |
| Costa Rica | 60 | 9 | 13 | 38 | 50 | 130 | -80 |
| Cuba | 9 | 7 | 2 | 0 | 24 | 4 | +20 |
| Curaçao (Note: Includes matches against the Netherlands Antilles.) | 23 | 12 | 9 | 2 | 31 | 17 | +14 |
| Denmark | 1 | 1 | 0 | 0 | 1 | 0 | +1 |
| Dominican Republic | 5 | 3 | 1 | 1 | 9 | 6 | +3 |
| Ecuador | 10 | 1 | 2 | 7 | 8 | 31 | -23 |
| Estonia | 1 | 0 | 0 | 1 | 0 | 2 | −2 |
| Ghana | 1 | 0 | 1 | 0 | 1 | 1 | 0 |
| Greece | 2 | 0 | 0 | 2 | 1 | 6 | -5 |
| Grenada | 3 | 2 | 1 | 0 | 7 | 3 | +4 |
| Guatemala | 90 | 23 | 27 | 40 | 75 | 110 | -35 |
| Guyana | 2 | 1 | 1 | 0 | 5 | 4 | +1 |
| Haiti | 27 | 15 | 6 | 6 | 36 | 18 | +18 |
| Honduras | 78 | 18 | 21 | 39 | 76 | 126 | -50 |
| Hungary | 4 | 0 | 1 | 3 | 3 | 17 | −14 |
| Iceland | 1 | 0 | 0 | 1 | 0 | 1 | -1 |
| Israel | 1 | 0 | 0 | 1 | 1 | 3 | −2 |
| Ivory Coast | 1 | 0 | 0 | 1 | 1 | 2 | −1 |
| Jamaica | 27 | 6 | 10 | 11 | 18 | 29 | −11 |
| Japan | 2 | 0 | 0 | 2 | 0 | 8 | −8 |
| Martinique | 7 | 3 | 2 | 2 | 7 | 5 | +2 |
| Mexico | 37 | 4 | 1 | 32 | 20 | 106 | −86 |
| Moldova | 1 | 1 | 0 | 0 | 2 | 0 | +2 |
| Montserrat | 6 | 5 | 1 | 0 | 11 | 3 | +8 |
| New Zealand | 1 | 0 | 1 | 0 | 2 | 2 | 0 |
| Nicaragua | 31 | 27 | 3 | 1 | 120 | 21 | +99 |
| Panama | 45 | 14 | 11 | 20 | 58 | 64 | −6 |
| Paraguay | 6 | 0 | 0 | 6 | 1 | 11 | −10 |
| Peru | 7 | 2 | 0 | 5 | 6 | 15 | −9 |
| Puerto Rico | 4 | 2 | 2 | 0 | 10 | 2 | +8 |
| Qatar | 3 | 0 | 1 | 2 | 2 | 4 | −2 |
| Republic of Ireland | 1 | 1 | 0 | 0 | 1 | 0 | +1 |
| Russia (Note: Includes matches against the Soviet Union.) | 5 | 0 | 0 | 5 | 1 | 10 | -9 |
| Saint Kitts and Nevis | 4 | 3 | 1 | 0 | 12 | 3 | +9 |
| Saint Lucia | 2 | 2 | 0 | 0 | 5 | 0 | +5 |
| Saint Vincent and the Grenadines | 5 | 4 | 0 | 1 | 16 | 7 | +9 |
| Serbia (Note: Includes matches against Yugoslavia.) | 1 | 0 | 0 | 1 | 1 | 4 | −3 |
| South Korea | 2 | 0 | 1 | 1 | 1 | 2 | –1 |
| Spain | 1 | 0 | 0 | 1 | 0 | 2 | -2 |
| Suriname | 12 | 8 | 1 | 3 | 30 | 14 | +16 |
| Trinidad and Tobago | 13 | 4 | 4 | 5 | 16 | 17 | -1 |
| United States | 28 | 1 | 7 | 20 | 16 | 63 | −47 |
| U.S. Virgin Islands | 1 | 1 | 0 | 0 | 7 | 0 | +7 |
| Venezuela | 5 | 2 | 0 | 3 | 6 | 7 | -1 |
| Zimbabwe | 1 | 0 | 1 | 0 | 0 | 0 | 0 |
| Total | 646 | 209 | 143 | 294 | 801 | 977 | –176 |

== FIFA ranking record ==
The following is a chart of the yearly averages of El Salvador's FIFA ranking.
