= Football at the 2017 Central American Games =

2017 Central American Games

Tournament details
- Host country: Nicaragua
- City: Managua
- Dates: 3 December 2017– 17 December 2017
- Teams: 6 (men's) + 4 (women's) (from 1 sub-confederation)

Final positions
- Champions: Honduras (men's); Costa Rica (women's)

The football tournament at the 2017 Central American Games took place in December 2017.

The tournament acted as a qualifying tournament for the Central American nations for the 2018 Central American and Caribbean Games. Three teams qualified from the men's tournament, two teams qualified from the women's tournament.

The men's tournament was restricted to those born after 1 January 1997 and the women's tournament had no age restrictions.

== Teams ==
In October 2017, CONCACAF wrote to ORDECA to confirm that teams from Guatemala would not be eligible for the competitions due to suspension of the National Football Federation of Guatemala from FIFA. Honduras and Belize did not enter a team into the women's competition.

=== Men's ===
Team	App.	Previous best
Belize	5th	Group stage (1994, 1997, 2001, 2013)
Costa Rica	7th	Gold medal (1997)
El Salvador	8th	Gold medal (1977)
Honduras	7th	Gold medal (1990, 1994, 2013)
Nicaragua	9th	Silver medal (1973)
Panama	6th	Gold medal (1973)

=== Women's ===
Team	App.	Previous best
Costa Rica	3rd	Gold medal (2001, 2013)
El Salvador	3rd	4th (2001)
Nicaragua	3rd	Silver medal (2013)
Panama	2nd	4th (2013)

== Men's tournament ==
=== Group stage ===
Tiebreakers

The teams are ranked according to points (3 points for a win, 1 point for a draw, 0 points for a loss). If tied on points, tiebreakers are applied in the following order:

1. Greater number of goals between teams
2. Number of goals scored in group
3. Goal difference in group
4. Number of goals scored across all groups
5. Drawing of lots

==== Group A ====
Pos	Team	Pld	W	D	L	GF	GA	GD	Pts	Qualification
1	Costa Rica	2	1	1	0	1	0	+1	4	Semi-finals
2	El Salvador	2	0	2	0	0	0	0	2	Semi-finals
3	Panama	2	0	1	1	0	1	−1	1	

First match(es) will be played: 7 December 2017. Source:
Rules for classification: Group stage tiebreakers
5 December 2017
16:00

Panama	0–1	Costa Rica
	Report

Nicaragua National Football Stadium, Managua
Referee: Sergio Reyna (Guatemala)

7 December 2017
16:00

Panama	0–0	El Salvador
	Report

Nicaragua National Football Stadium, Managua
Referee: Raúl Castro Zuniga (Honduras)

9 December 2017
16:00

Costa Rica	0–0	El Salvador
	Report

Nicaragua National Football Stadium, Managua
Referee: Sergio Reyna (Guatemala)

==== Group B ====
Pos	Team	Pld	W	D	L	GF	GA	GD	Pts	Qualification
1	Honduras	2	1	1	0	5	0	+5	4	Semi-finals
2	Nicaragua	2	0	2	0	1	1	0	2	Semi-finals
3	Belize	2	0	1	1	1	6	−5	1	

First match(es) will be played: 7 December 2017. Source:
Rules for classification: Group stage tiebreakers
5 December 2017
19:00

Nicaragua	1–1	Belize
	Report

Nicaragua National Football Stadium, Managua
Referee: Juan Calderon (Costa Rica)

7 December 2017
19:00

Belize	0–5	Honduras
	Report

Nicaragua National Football Stadium, Managua
Referee: Ameth Ariel Sanchez (Panama)

9 December 2017
19:00

Nicaragua	0–0	Honduras
	Report

Nicaragua National Football Stadium, Managua
Referee: Jaime Herrera (El Salvador)

=== Knockout stage ===
Semifinals
11 December 2017
Costa Rica	1
Nicaragua	0
11 December 2017
Honduras	1 (2)
El Salvador	1 (1)

Final
13 December 2017
Costa Rica	0
Honduras	1

==== Semi-finals ====
11 December 2017
16:00

Honduras	1–1	El Salvador
	Report
Penalties
	2–1

Nicaragua National Football Stadium, Managua
Referee: Juan Calderon (Costa Rica)
11 December 2017
19:00

Costa Rica	1–0	Nicaragua
	Report

Nicaragua National Football Stadium, Managua
Referee: Ameth Ariel Sánchez (Panama)

==== Third-place playoff ====
13 December 2017
16:00

Nicaragua	0–1	El Salvador
	Report

Nicaragua National Football Stadium, Managua
Referee: Raul Castro Zuniga (Honduras)

==== Final ====
13 December 2017
19:00

Costa Rica	0–1	Honduras
	Report

Nicaragua National Football Stadium, Managua
Referee: Jaime Herrera (El Salvador)

== Women's tournament ==
=== Group stage ===
Pos	Team	Pld	W	D	L	GF	GA	GD	Pts	Qualification
1	Costa Rica	3	3	0	0	15	1	+14	9	Semi-finals
2	Nicaragua	3	2	0	1	5	5	0	6	Semi-finals
3	Panama	3	1	0	2	6	8	−2	3	Semi-finals
4	El Salvador	3	0	0	3	3	15	−12	0	Semi-finals

First match(es) will be played: 6 December 2017. Source:
Rules for classification: 1) Points; 2) Goal difference; 3) Number of goals scored;
6 December 2017
16:00

Costa Rica	4–0	Panama
Granados 67', 71', 82', 85'	Report

Estadio Independencia, Estelí
6 December 2017
19:00

Nicaragua	2–1	El Salvador
W. Flores 27'; Y. Flores 67'	Report	Cerén 75'

Estadio Independencia, Estelí

8 December 2017
16:00

El Salvador	1–8	Costa Rica
Herrera 33'	Report	Morales 4', 35'; Chinchilla 6'; Coto 21'; Araya 27', 55'; Varela 45', 51'

Estadio Independencia, Estelí
8 December 2017
19:00

Nicaragua	3–1	Panama
Acevedo 5', 44'; Y. Flores 67'	Report	Mills 77'

Estadio Independencia, Estelí

10 December 2017
16:00

Panama	5–1	El Salvador
Riley 6', 64'; Mills 21'; Rangel 78'; Cedeño 90+1'	Report	Osegueda 1'

Estadio Independencia, Estelí
10 December 2017
19:00

Nicaragua	0–3	Costa Rica
	Report	Varela 24'; Alvarado 29' (pen.); Rodríguez 77'

Estadio Independencia, Estelí

=== Knockout stage ===
==== Semi-finals ====
12 December 2017
16:00

Costa Rica	3–0	El Salvador
Chinchilla 59', 65', 81'	Report

Estadio Independencia, Estelí
12 December 2017
19:00

Nicaragua	1–1	Panama
Aguilar 13'	Report	Hernández 87'
Penalties
	4–2

Estadio Independencia, Estelí

==== Third-place playoff ====
14 December 2017
16:00

El Salvador	1–1	Panama
Payés 11'	Report	Cox 60'
Penalties
	1–4

Estadio Independencia, Estelí

==== Final ====
14 December 2017
19:00

Costa Rica	1–1	Nicaragua
Alvarado 40'	Report	Pérez 18'
Penalties
	2–0

Estadio Independencia, Estelí

== Qualified teams for Central American and Caribbean Games ==
For the men's, the top three teams qualified for the 2018 Central American and Caribbean Games as the UNCAF representatives:

- Honduras
- Costa Rica
- El Salvador

For the women's, the top two teams qualified for the 2018 Central American and Caribbean Games as the UNCAF representatives:

- Costa Rica
- Nicaragua
