= Football at the 2013 Central American Games =

2013 Central American Games
X Juegos Centroamericanos San José

Tournament details
- Host country: Costa Rica
- City: San José
- Dates: 6–16 March 2013
- Teams: (from 1 confederation) (from 1 association)
- Venues: 2 (in 1 host city)

Final positions
- Champions: Honduras (3rd title)
- Runners-up: Costa Rica
- Third place: El Salvador
- Fourth place: Guatemala

The football tournament at the 2013 Central American Games is held in San José, Costa Rica from March 6 to March 16. Members who are affiliated to ORDECA are invite it to send their full women's national teams and men's U-21 teams to participate.

== Participants ==
Team	App.	Previous best
Belize	4th	Group stage (1994, 1997, 2001)
Belize (Women's)	2nd	Group stage (2001)
Costa Rica	6th	Gold medal (1997)
Costa Rica (Women's)	2nd	Gold medal (2001)
El Salvador	7th	Gold medal (1977)
El Salvador (Women's)	2nd	4th (2001)
Guatemala	7th	Gold medal (1986, 2001)
Guatemala (Women's)	2nd	Bronze medal (2001)
Honduras	6th	Gold medal (1990, 1994)
Honduras (Women's)	2nd	Silver medal (2001)
Nicaragua	8th	Silver medal (1973)
Nicaragua (Women's)	2nd	Group stage (2001)
Panama	5th	Gold medal (1973)
Panama (Women's)	1st	—

== Venue ==
San José, Costa Rica
Estadio Nacional	Estadio Ernesto Rohrmoser
Capacity: 35,000	Capacity: 3,000
San José is located in Costa Rica

== Schedule ==
The competition was spread out across eleven days, with the men and women competing on alternating dates.

Group Stage	Semifinals	Event finals

March	6th Wed	7th Thu	8th Fri	9th Sat	10th Sun	11th Mon	12th Tue	13th Wed	14th Thu	15th	Gold medals
Men										M	1
Women									M		1

== Men's tournament ==
=== Groups ===
==== Group A ====
Pos	Team	Pld	W	D	L	GF	GA	GD	Pts	Qualification
1	Costa Rica	3	3	0	0	8	0	+8	9	Semifinals
2	El Salvador	3	1	1	1	6	4	+2	4	Semifinals
3	Belize	3	1	1	1	3	5	−2	4	
4	Nicaragua	3	0	0	3	1	9	−8	0	

7 March 2013
10:00 (UTC−06:00)
Day 1

El Salvador	5–0	Nicaragua
Suazo 23', Ayala 45+1', Peña 72', 75', Galdamez 83'

Estadio Ernesto Rohrmoser, San José, Costa Rica
7 March 2013
18:00 (UTC−06:00)
Day 1

Costa Rica	3–0	Belize
Agüero 39'; Ordian 89'; Fernández 90+1'

Estadio Ernesto Rohrmoser, San José, Costa Rica

9 March 2013
10:00 (UTC−06:00)
Day 2

Belize	1–1	El Salvador
Thurton 76'		Gonzalez 67'

Estadio Ernesto Rohrmoser, San José, Costa Rica
9 March 2013
18:00 (UTC−06:00)
Day 2

Costa Rica	2–0	Nicaragua
Ramírez 13', 20'

Estadio Ernesto Rohrmoser, San José, Costa Rica

11 March 2013
10:00 (UTC−06:00)
Day 3

Nicaragua	1–2	Belize
Garay 80'		Guerra 41'; Torres 73'

Estadio Ernesto Rohrmoser, San José, Costa Rica
11 March 2013
18:00 (UTC−06:00)
Day 3

Costa Rica	3–0	El Salvador
Ramírez 59', 63', 70'

Estadio Ernesto Rohrmoser, San José, Costa Rica

==== Group B ====
Pos	Team	Pld	W	D	L	GF	GA	GD	Pts	Qualification
1	Honduras	2	1	1	0	2	1	+1	4	Semifinals
2	Guatemala	2	1	0	1	1	1	0	3	Semifinals
3	Panama	2	0	1	1	1	2	−1	1	

7 March 2013
15:00 (UTC−06:00)
Day 1

Honduras	1–1	Panama
Ramirez 83'		Muñoz 45+1'

Estadio Ernesto Rohrmoser, San José, Costa Rica

9 March 2013
15:00 (UTC−06:00)
Day 2

Panama	0–1	Guatemala
		de León Ramos 40'

Estadio Ernesto Rohrmoser, San José, Costa Rica

11 March 2013
15:00 (UTC−06:00)
Day 3

Guatemala	0–1	Honduras
		Róchez 70'

Estadio Ernesto Rohrmoser, San José, Costa Rica

=== Semifinals ===
13 March 2013
18:00 (UTC−06:00)
Semifinals

Costa Rica	2–1	Guatemala
Sequeira 24'; Fernández 84'		Sequen 42'

Estadio Nacional, San José, Costa Rica
13 March 2013
15:00 (UTC−06:00)
Semifinals

Honduras	3–0	El Salvador
Salas 27'; Róchez 88'; Benavidez 90+6'

Estadio Nacional, San José, Costa Rica

=== Third Place ===
15 March 2013
15:00 (UTC−06:00)
3rd place

El Salvador	2–1	Guatemala
Villavicencio 75'; Zavaleta 90+3'		Jiménez 17'

Estadio Nacional, San José, Costa Rica

=== Final ===
15 March 2013
19:00 (UTC−06:00)
Final

Costa Rica	0–1	Honduras
		Róchez 45'

Estadio Nacional, San José, Costa Rica

=== Medals ===
Country	Medal
Honduras	1st place, gold medalist(s)
Costa Rica	2nd place, silver medalist(s)
El Salvador	3rd place, bronze medalist(s)

== Women's tournament ==
=== Groups ===
==== Group A ====
Pos	Team	Pld	W	D	L	GF	GA	GD	Pts	Qualification
1	Costa Rica	3	3	0	0	20	1	+19	9	Semifinals
2	Nicaragua	3	2	0	1	5	5	0	6	Semifinals
3	El Salvador	3	1	0	2	11	6	+5	3	
4	Belize	3	0	0	3	1	25	−24	0	

6 March 2013
15:00 (UTC−06:00)
Day 1

El Salvador	1–3	Nicaragua
Queles 55'		Acevedo 50'; Acevedo 71'; Hernández 86'

Estadio Ernesto Rohrmoser, San José, Costa Rica
6 March 2013
18:00 (UTC−06:00)
Day 1

Costa Rica	14–0	Belize
Rodríguez 8', 12', 24', 42'; Herrera 15'; Acosta 26', 44', 65'; Alvarado 37'; Cruz 50' 87'; Venegas 70'; Granados 78'; Lázaro 80'

Estadio Ernesto Rohrmoser, San José, Costa Rica

8 March 2013
10:00 (UTC−06:00)
Day 2

Belize	0–9	El Salvador
		Herrera 30', 40'; González 38', 52', 65'; Landaverde 83', 87', 90+1'; Tamacas 88'

Estadio Ernesto Rohrmoser, San José, Costa Rica
8 March 2013
18:00 (UTC−06:00)
Day 2

Costa Rica	3–0	Nicaragua
Ugalde 6'; Cruz 13'; Rodríguez 52'

Estadio Ernesto Rohrmoser, San José, Costa Rica

10 March 2013
10:00 (UTC−06:00)
Day 3

Nicaragua	2–1	Belize
Acevedo 11'; Aguilar 79'		Halliday 49'

Estadio Ernesto Rohrmoser, San José, Costa Rica
10 March 2013
18:00 (UTC−06:00)
Day 3

Costa Rica	3–1	El Salvador
Rodríguez 12' (pen.); Portillo 34' (o.g.); Acosta 42'	Report	Portillo 27'

Estadio Ernesto Rohrmoser, San José, Costa Rica

==== Group B ====
Pos	Team	Pld	W	D	L	GF	GA	GD	Pts	Qualification
1	Guatemala	2	2	0	0	9	4	+5	6	Semifinals
2	Panama	2	1	0	1	5	5	0	3	Semifinals
3	Honduras	2	0	0	2	4	9	−5	0	

6 March 2013
15:00 (UTC−06:00)
Day 1

Panama	2–3	Guatemala
Mills 56'; Evans 70'		Albeño 15' 55'; Martínez 51'

Estadio Ernesto Rohrmoser, San José, Costa Rica

8 March 2013
15:00 (UTC−06:00)
Day 2

Honduras	2–3	Panama
Rodríguez 89', 90+2'		Riley 26'; Domínguez 34'; De Mera 78'

Estadio Ernesto Rohrmoser, San José, Costa Rica

10 March 2013
15:00 (UTC−06:00)
Day 3

Guatemala	6–2	Honduras
Monterroso 6', 41', 63', 76'; López 9', 56'	Report	Umanzor 21', 25'

Estadio Ernesto Rohrmoser, San José, Costa Rica

=== Semifinals ===
12 March 2013
18:00 (UTC−06:00)
Semifinals

Costa Rica	3–0	Panama
Venegas 53'; Rodríguez 77'; Cruz 81'	Report

TBD, San José, Costa Rica
12 March 2013
15:00 (UTC−06:00)
Semifinals

Guatemala	1–2	Nicaragua
Monterroso 45+1'		Cate 18', 22'

TBD, San José, Costa Rica

=== Third Place ===
15 March 2013
10:00 (UTC−06:00)
3rd place

Guatemala	5–3	Panama
Martínez 15'; De León 24', 65'; Albeño 45+1'; Monterroso 88'		De Mera 30'; Mills 45'; Evans 85'

TBD, San José, Costa Rica

=== Final ===
15 March 2013
18:00 (UTC−06:00)
Final

Costa Rica	4–0	Nicaragua
Acosta 14', 20'; Alvarado 26'; Cruz 56'

TBD, San José, Costa Rica

=== Medals ===
Country	Medal
Costa Rica	1st place, gold medalist(s)
Nicaragua	2nd place, silver medalist(s)
Guatemala	3rd place, bronze medalist(s)
