= Football at the Central American Games =

- Organiser(s): ORDECA
- Founded: Men: 1973; 53 years ago Women: 2001; 25 years ago
- Region: Central America
- Teams: 7 (men and women)
- Related competitions: Pan American Games; Central American and Caribbean Games
- Current champions: Men: Costa Rica (2nd title); Women: Costa Rica (4th title)
- Most championships: Men: Honduras (4 titles); Women: Costa Rica (4 titles)

Football at the Central American Games is an association football competition organized by ORDECA in the regional multi-sport event of the Central American Games. The men's tournament has been played since 1973, it is for under-20 teams. The women's tournament has been played since 2001, it is for senior national teams.

== Results ==
=== Men's tournament ===
Year	Host city	Gold	Silver	Bronze	Fourth place
U-20 teams
1973	Guatemala City	Panama	Nicaragua	El Salvador	Guatemala
1977	(El Salvador) San Salvador	El Salvador	Panama	Nicaragua	Guatemala
1986	Guatemala City	Guatemala	Honduras	Nicaragua	El Salvador
1990	(Honduras) Tegucigalpa	Honduras	Costa Rica	Nicaragua	–
1994	(El Salvador) San Salvador	Honduras	El Salvador	Costa Rica	Guatemala
1997	(Honduras) San Pedro Sula	Costa Rica	Panama	Honduras	El Salvador
2001	Guatemala City	Guatemala	Honduras	Costa Rica	Panama
2006	(Honduras) San Pedro Sula	The tournament was canceled			
2010	Panama City	The tournament was canceled			
2013	(Costa Rica) San José	Honduras	Costa Rica	El Salvador	Guatemala
2017	(Nicaragua) Managua	Honduras	Costa Rica	El Salvador	Nicaragua
2022	(El Salvador) Santa Tecla	The tournament was canceled			
2025	Guatemala City	Costa Rica	Panama	Guatemala	El Salvador

=== Women's tournament ===
Year	Host city	Gold	Silver	Bronze	Fourth place
Senior teams
2001	Guatemala City	Costa Rica	Honduras	Guatemala	El Salvador
2013	(Costa Rica) San José	Costa Rica	Nicaragua	Guatemala	Panama
2017	(Nicaragua) Managua	Costa Rica	Nicaragua	Panama	El Salvador
2022	(El Salvador) Santa Tecla	The tournament was canceled			
2025	Guatemala City	Costa Rica	El Salvador	Guatemala	Nicaragua

== Performances ==
=== Men's medals ===
Team	Gold	Silver	Bronze	Total
Honduras	4 (1990, 1994, 2013, 2017)	2 (1986, 2001)	1 (1997)	7
Costa Rica	2 (1997, 2025)	3 (1990, 2013, 2017)	2 (1994, 2001)	7
Guatemala	2 (1986, 2001)	1 (2025)	–	3
Panama	1 (1973)	3 (1977, 1997, 2025)	–	4
El Salvador	1 (1977)	1 (1990)	3 (1973, 2013, 2017)	5
Nicaragua	–	1 (1973)	3 (1977, 1986, 1990)	4

Notes

Italic — Hosts

=== Women's medals ===
Team	Gold	Silver	Bronze	Total
Costa Rica	4 (2001, 2013, 2017, 2025)	–	–	4
Nicaragua	–	2 (2013, 2017)	–	2
El Salvador	–	1 (2025)	–	1
Honduras	–	1 (2001)	–	1
Guatemala	–	–	3 (2001, 2013, 2025)	3
Panama	–	–	1 (2017)	1

Notes

Italic — Hosts

== Overall statistics ==
=== Men's tournament ===
Pos.	Team	W	D	L	GF	GA	Dif.	Per.
1	Honduras	19	5	4	58	17	+41	0.768
2	Costa Rica	16	4	10	47	28	+19	0.600
3	Panama	11	5	8	36	20	+16	0.562
4	El Salvador	12	8	11	46	30	+16	0.516
5	Guatemala	12	5	12	41	29	+12	0.500
6	Nicaragua	5	5	21	22	87	–65	0.242
7	Belize	1	2	10	7	46	–40	0.154

== See also ==
- Football at the Pan American Games
- Football at the Central American and Caribbean Games
- Football at the South American Games
- Football at the Bolivarian Games
