= Football at the 2001 Central American Games =

2001 - Men's Football at the Central Games
Fútbol Masculino en los Juegos Centroamericanos 2001 (in Spanish)

Tournament details
- Host country: Guatemala
- City: Guatemala City
- Dates: 22 November – 2 December 2001
- Teams: 7 (from 1 confederation)
- Venue: 1 (in 1 host city)

Final positions
- Champions: Guatemala (2nd title)
- Runners-up: Honduras
- Third place: Costa Rica
- Fourth place: Panama

Tournament statistics
- Matches played: 15
- Goals scored: 41 (2.73 per match)

The Men's Association football competition at the 2001 Central American Games took place from 22 November to 2 December at the Estadio Mateo Flores in Guatemala City. This was the seventh Football edition since 1973.

== Teams ==
Team	App.	Previous best
Belize	3rd	Group stage (1994, 1997)
Belize (Women's)	1st	—
Costa Rica	5th	Gold medal (1997)
Costa Rica (Women's)	1st	—
El Salvador	6th	Gold medal (1977)
El Salvador (Women's)	1st	—
Guatemala	6th	Gold medal (1986)
Guatemala (Women's)	1st	—
Honduras	5th	Gold medal (1990, 1994)
Honduras (Women's)	1st	—
Nicaragua	7th	Silver medal (1973)
Nicaragua (Women's)	1st	—
Panama	4th	Gold medal (1973)

== Venue ==
Guatemala City
Estadio Mateo Flores
14°37′32.75″N 90°30′37.76″W
Capacity: 30,000

== Men's tournament ==
=== Group A ===
Pos	Team	Pld	W	D	L	GF	GA	GD	Pts	Qualification
1	Panama	2	2	0	0	3	0	+3	6	Qualified to the Final group
2	Costa Rica	2	1	0	1	3	1	+2	3	Qualified to the Final group
3	El Salvador	2	0	0	2	0	5	−5	0	

22 November 2001 Round 1	El Salvador	0 – 2	Panama	Guatemala City, Guatemala
			Hansell 64'; Garcés 80'	Stadium: Estadio Mateo Flores

24 November 2001 Round 2	Costa Rica	0 – 1	Panama	Guatemala City, Guatemala
			Hansell 42'	Stadium: Estadio Mateo Flores

26 November 2001 Round 3	Costa Rica	3 – 0	El Salvador	Guatemala City, Guatemala
	Scott 7'; Granados 45'; Vallejos 76'			Stadium: Estadio Mateo Flores

=== Group B ===
Pos	Team	Pld	W	D	L	GF	GA	GD	Pts	Qualification
1	Guatemala	3	2	1	0	9	3	+6	7	Qualified to the Final group
2	Honduras	3	2	1	0	5	2	+3	7	Qualified to the Final group
3	Nicaragua	3	1	0	2	5	8	−3	3	
4	Belize	3	0	0	3	3	9	−6	0	

22 November 2001 Round 1	Guatemala	4 – 0	Belize	Guatemala City, Guatemala
	Thompson 9'; Preigo 16' 19'; Ligorria 26'			Stadium: Estadio Mateo Flores

22 November 2001 Round 1	Honduras	2 – 0	Nicaragua	Guatemala City, Guatemala
	Chamorro 48'; Zelaya 90'			Stadium: Estadio Mateo Flores

24 November 2001 Round 2	Guatemala	1 – 1	Honduras	Guatemala City, Guatemala
	Mejía 56'		Laing 4'	Stadium: Estadio Mateo Flores

24 November 2001 Round 2	Belize	2 – 3	Nicaragua	Guatemala City, Guatemala
	unknown (?) unknown (?) unknown (?)		Calero 2'; Webster (?)	Stadium: Estadio Mateo Flores

26 November 2001 Round 3	Guatemala	4 – 2	Nicaragua	Guatemala City, Guatemala
	Murga 10'; Enríquez 46'; Priego 76' 90'		Webster 44' 55'	Stadium: Estadio Mateo Flores

26 November 2001 Round 3	Belize	1 – 2	Honduras	Guatemala City, Guatemala
	Lyons (?)		Figueroa (?); Bertrand (?)	Stadium: Estadio Mateo Flores

=== Final Group ===
Pos	Team	Pld	W	D	L	GF	GA	GD	Pts	Result
1	Guatemala	3	3	0	0	4	0	+4	9	Gold medal
2	Honduras	3	2	0	1	4	3	+1	6	Silver medal
3	Costa Rica	3	1	0	2	3	5	−2	3	Bronze medal
4	Panama	3	0	0	3	2	5	−3	0	

28 November 2001 Round 1	Guatemala	2 – 0	Costa Rica	Guatemala City, Guatemala
	Leonardo 12'; Priego 80'			Stadium: Estadio Mateo Flores

28 November 2001 Round 1	Honduras	2 – 1	Panama	Guatemala City, Guatemala
	Zelaya 53' 89'		Pérez 37'	Stadium: Estadio Mateo Flores

30 November 2001 Round 2	Costa Rica	1 – 2	Honduras	Guatemala City, Guatemala
	Scott 8'		Figueroa 21' (pen.); Zelaya 69'	Stadium: Estadio Mateo Flores

30 November 2001 Round 2	Guatemala	1 – 0	Panama	Guatemala City, Guatemala
	Albizuris 20'			Stadium: Estadio Mateo Flores

2 December 2001 Round 3	Guatemala	1 – 0	Honduras	Guatemala City, Guatemala
	Priego 60'			Stadium: Estadio Mateo Flores

2 December 2001 Round 3	Costa Rica	2 – 1	Panama	Guatemala City, Guatemala
	Araya 33'; Scott 57' (pen.)		Garcés 68'	Stadium: Estadio Mateo Flores

== Women's tournament ==
The women's football competition at the 2001 Central American Games was divided into two groups of three teams, advancing the top-2 to the semifinals. Unlike the men's tournament that only accepted U-21 players, the women's used their senior squads.

=== Group A ===
Pos	Team	Pld	W	D	L	GF	GA	GD	Pts	Qualification
1	Guatemala	2	2	0	0	16	1	+15	6	Qualified to the Semifinals
2	El Salvador	2	1	0	1	7	4	+3	3	Qualified to the Semifinals
3	Belize	2	0	0	2	0	18	−18	0	

23 November 2001 Round 1	Guatemala	4 – 1	El Salvador	Guatemala City, Guatemala
	Guerra 43'; Pérez 50'; Rossell 79'; Urizar 79'		Guevara 60'	Stadium: Estadio Mateo Flores

25 November 2001 Round 2	Guatemala	12 – 0	Belize	Guatemala City, Guatemala
	Urizar 14' 88'; Rossell 24'; Vargas 30'; Pérez 43'; Cuellar 66' 68'; Carrillo 70' 81' 84'; Suriano 75'; Ruano 87'			Stadium: Estadio Mateo Flores

27 November 2001 Round 3	Belize	0 – 6	El Salvador	Guatemala City, Guatemala
			Navarro 16' (pen.); Guevara 20' 31'; Rodríguez 28'; Castillo 42' 89'	Stadium: Estadio Mateo Flores

=== Group B ===
Pos	Team	Pld	W	D	L	GF	GA	GD	Pts	Qualification
1	Costa Rica	2	2	0	0	11	1	+10	6	Qualified to the Semifinals
2	Honduras	2	1	0	1	4	5	−1	3	Qualified to the Semifinals
3	Nicaragua	2	0	0	2	1	10	−9	0	

23 November 2001 Round 1	Costa Rica	6 – 1	Nicaragua	Guatemala City, Guatemala
	Rodríguez 8'; Zúniga 30'; Alvarez 39' 77'; Castro 59'; Montoya 87'		Maradiaga 10'	Stadium: Estadio Mateo Flores

25 November 2001 Round 2	Nicaragua	0 – 4	Honduras	Guatemala City, Guatemala
			Tejada 63' 72' 77'; Hernández 88'	Stadium: Estadio Mateo Flores

27 November 2001 Round 3	Costa Rica	5 – 0	Honduras	Guatemala City, Guatemala
	Barrantes 4'; Alvarez 9' 15' 35'; Briceño 78'			Stadium: Estadio Mateo Flores

=== Semifinals ===
29 November 2001 Semifinal 1	Guatemala	1 – 1 (2 – 3 p)	Honduras	Guatemala City, Guatemala
	Pérez 40'		Tejada 38'	Stadium: Estadio Mateo Flores

29 November 2001 Semifinal 2	Costa Rica	3 – 1	El Salvador	Guatemala City, Guatemala
	Castro 4' 49'; Guevara 42'		Barrantes 89'	Stadium: Estadio Mateo Flores

=== Third place ===
29 November 2001 Third place	Guatemala	4 – 0	El Salvador	Guatemala City, Guatemala
	Cuellar 32'; Pérez 43'; Carrillo 51'; Rossell 53'			Stadium: Estadio Mateo Flores

=== Final ===
1 December 2001 Final	Costa Rica	4 – 1	Honduras	Guatemala City, Guatemala
	Alvarez 13'; Barrantes 20'; Castro 25'; Barrantes 49'		Hernández 1'	Stadium: Estadio Mateo Flores

=== Medals ===
Country	Medal
Costa Rica	1st place, gold medalist(s)
Honduras	2nd place, silver medalist(s)
Guatemala	3rd place, bronze medalist(s)
