= Rocky Rodríguez =

Costa Rican footballer (born 1993)

- Rodríguez with the Kansas City Current in 2026

Personal information
- Full name: Raquel Rodríguez Cedeño
- Date of birth: 28 October 1993 (age 33)
- Place of birth: San José, Costa Rica
- Height: 1.66 m (5 ft 5 1/2 in)
- Positions: Forward; midfielder

Team information
- Current team: Kansas City Current
- Number: 11

College career
Years	Team	Apps	(Gls)
2012–2015	Penn State Nittany Lions	93	(23)

Senior career*
Years	Team	Apps	(Gls)
2011-2012	Deportivo Saprissa	?	(?)
2016–2019	Sky Blue FC	76	(8)
2017–2018	→ Perth Glory (loan)	9	(0)
2020–2023	Portland Thorns	56	(6)
2024	Angel City FC	20	(1)
2025–	Kansas City Current	41	(1)

International career^{‡}
2008–2010	Costa Rica U17	3	(3)
2008–2012	Costa Rica U20	14	(10)
2008–	Costa Rica	112	(58)
Medal record
Women's football
Representing Costa Rica
Pan American Games
Bronze medal – third place	2019 Lima	Team
- * Club domestic league appearances and goals as of 16:50, 14 November 2026 (UTC) ‡ National team caps and goals as of 18 June 2025

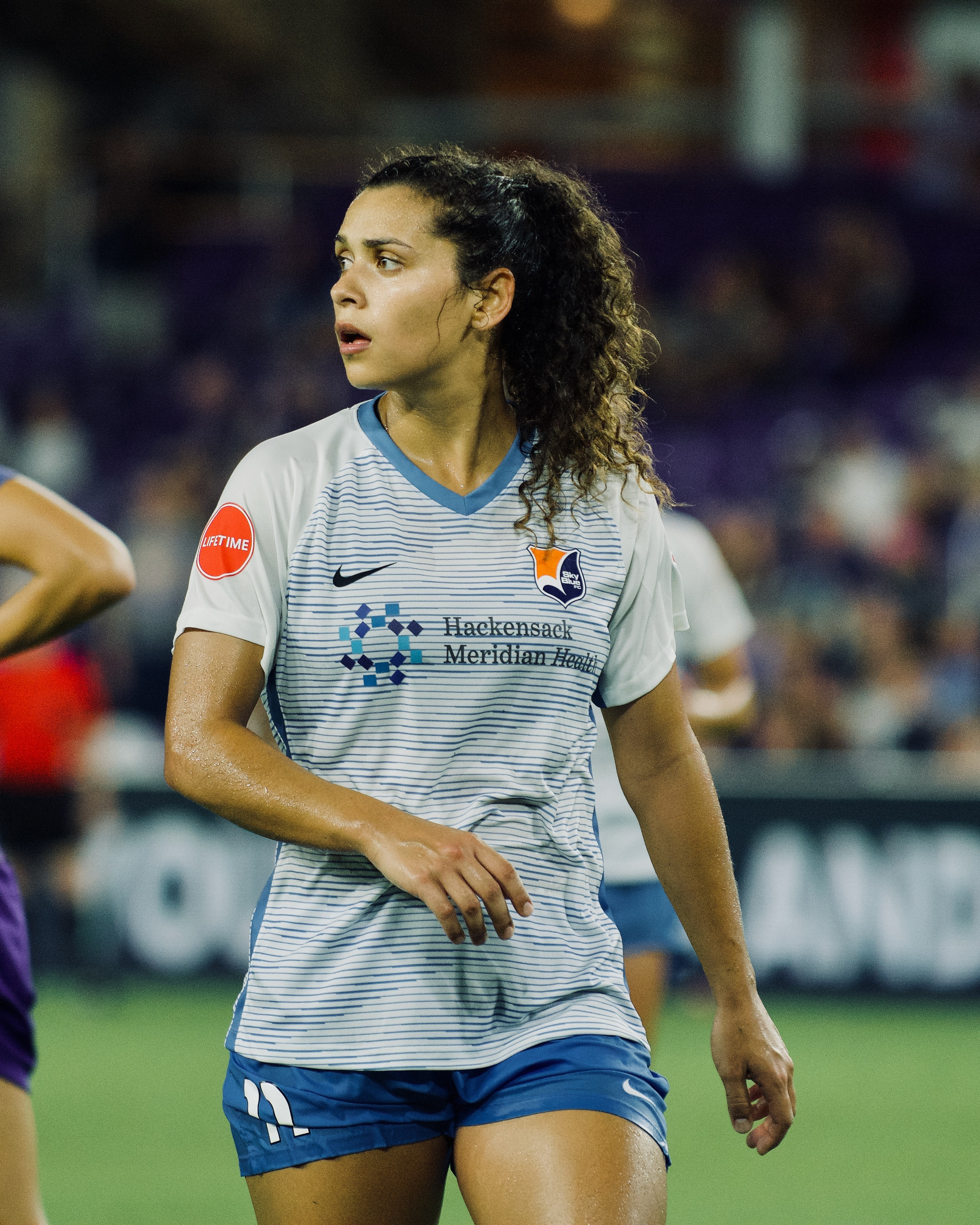
Rodríguez with Sky Blue FC in 2018

Raquel "Rocky" Rodríguez Cedeño (Note: In this Spanish name, the first or paternal surname is Rodríguez and the second or maternal family name is Cedeño.) (born 28 October 1993) is a Costa Rican professional footballer who plays as an attacking midfielder for Kansas City Current of the National Women's Soccer League and the Costa Rica national team.

Rodríguez played college soccer for the Penn State Nittany Lions, where she won the NCAA championship and the Hermann Trophy in 2015. She was drafted second overall by Sky Blue FC in the 2016 NWSL College Draft and named NWSL Rookie of the Year in 2016. In 2020, she was traded to Portland Thorns FC, where she won the NWSL Championship in 2022.

== Early life ==
Born in San José, Costa Rica to Grettel Cedeño and Sivianni Rodriguez. Rodriguez, nicknamed Rocky, was raised in Costa Rica and moved to the United States where support for women's soccer offered more opportunity. Her father, Sivianni Rodríguez, played professionally in Costa Rica with Herediano and the Costa Rica men's national team.

Rodriquez began playing soccer at age four and played on boys teams and trained with her brother and father as a youth. At age 11, her cousin told her one of the well-known men's club teams, Deportivo Saprissa, was holding tryouts for a women's team. After trying out, she played for the under-15 team. She played for her high school team while still attending elementary school. Both Raquel and her brother, Sivianni, attended International Christian School. She played for the school's team for a short while before committing to play for Costa Rica's national teams.

=== Penn State, 2012–2015 ===
Rodriguez was a four-year starter for the Penn State Nittany Lions. As the 2015 team captain, she led her team to victory at the NCAA College Cup by scoring the game-winning goal against the Duke Blue Devils. Rodriguez received numerous awards in 2015, including NSCAA Scholar Player of the Year, Top Drawer Soccer Player of the Year, and she was the 2015 recipient of the Hermann Trophy. As a senior, she won the Honda Sports Award as the nation's top soccer player.

== Club career ==
=== Deportivo Saprissa, 2012 ===
Rodriguez started her senior career at Deportivo Saprissa's women's team, before going on abroad to play college soccer in the US.

=== Sky Blue FC, 2016–2019 ===
Rodríguez was selected second overall by Sky Blue FC in the 2016 NWSL College Draft. In her rookie season, she scored 1 goal in 18 matches, and at the end of the season was named NWSL Rookie of the Year. In the 2017 season, Rodríguez scored the fastest goal in NWSL history, netting 24 seconds from kick-off against Portland Thorns FC.

=== Perth Glory, 2017 ===
On 12 October 2017, Rodríguez joined Perth Glory for the 2017–18 W-League season. Rodríguez is the first Central American ever to play in the W-League.

=== Portland Thorns FC, 2020–2023 ===
On 8 January 2020, Rodríguez was traded to Portland Thorns FC. During the 2020 season, Rodriguez scored 1 goal. During the 2021 season, she scored 2 goals. During the 2022 season, she scored 3 goals.

=== Angel City FC, 2024 ===
On 23 January 2024 Angel City FC announced they had acquired Rodríguez from the Portland Thorns in exchange for $275,000 in allocation money, with additional conditional funds to be paid against the transfer fee threshold. After missing the first two games of the season due to concussion protocol, Rodríguez made her debut for Angel City on 30 March 2024 in a match against Kansas City Current. She came on a substitute for Amandine Henry and came close to scoring her first goal for Angel City to tie the game at 3–3, but was the goal was ultimately disallowed after a VAR check, and the match ended as a 4–2 defeat. Rodríguez started her first match the following match day, 13 April 2024, against the Chicago Red Stars which finished as a 0–1 victory, the teams first win of the season. Rodríguez scored her first goal for Angel City on 19 June 2024, in a 3–2 victory against Racing Louisville FC.

=== Kansas City Current, 2025– ===
On 20 December 2024 Angel City announced that Rodríguez would be traded to Kansas City Current in exchange for $100,000 in intra-league transfer funds.

== International career ==
During the 2015 FIFA World Cup, Rodriguez scored Costa Rica's first ever Women's World Cup goal during the opening Group Stage match against Spain, which ended 1–1. Rodriguez played in all of Costa Rica's three matches in the tournament. During the CONCACAF Olympic Qualifying tournament, Rodriguez scored five goals in the three group stage matches.

Rodriguez was selected for the roster for the inaugural 2024 CONCACAF W Gold Cup where she played every minute before Costa Rica were ultimately defeated in the quarterfinals by Canada.

== Career statistics ==
=== International goals ===
No.	Date	Venue	Opponent	Score	Result	Competition
1.	30 April 2010	Estadio Nacional de la UNAN-Managua, Managua, Nicaragua	Nicaragua	1–0	2–0	2010 CONCACAF Women's World Cup Qualifying qualification
2.	30 October 2010	Estadio Quintana Roo, Cancún, Mexico	Haiti	2–0	3–0	2010 CONCACAF Women's Championship
3.	30 October 2010	Estadio Quintana Roo, Cancún, Mexico	Haiti	3–0	3–0	2010 CONCACAF Women's Championship
4.	2 October 2011	Estadio Cementos Progreso, Guatemala City, Guatemala	El Salvador	1–2	6–2	2012 CONCACAF Women's Olympic Qualifying Tournament
5.	2 October 2011	Estadio Cementos Progreso, Guatemala City, Guatemala	El Salvador	2–2	6–2	2012 CONCACAF Women's Olympic Qualifying Tournament
6.	4 October 2011	Estadio Cementos Progreso, Guatemala City, Guatemala	Honduras	4–0	4–0	2012 CONCACAF Women's Olympic Qualifying Tournament
7.	6 October 2011	Estadio Cementos Progreso, Guatemala City, Guatemala	Guatemala	1–0	5–2	2012 CONCACAF Women's Olympic Qualifying Tournament
8.	6 October 2011	Estadio Cementos Progreso, Guatemala City, Guatemala	Guatemala	2–1	5–2	2012 CONCACAF Women's Olympic Qualifying Tournament
9.	6 October 2011	Estadio Cementos Progreso, Guatemala City, Guatemala	Guatemala	4–2	5–2	2012 CONCACAF Women's Olympic Qualifying Tournament
10.	22 October 2011	Estadio Omnilife, Guadalajara, Mexico	Argentina	2–3	3–3	2011 Pan American Games
11.	6 March 2013	Estadio Ernesto Rohrmoser, San José, Costa Rica	Belize	1–0	14–0	2013 Central American Games
12.	6 March 2013	Estadio Ernesto Rohrmoser, San José, Costa Rica	Belize	2–0	14–0	2013 Central American Games
13.	6 March 2013	Estadio Ernesto Rohrmoser, San José, Costa Rica	Belize	4–0	14–0	2013 Central American Games
14.	6 March 2013	Estadio Ernesto Rohrmoser, San José, Costa Rica	Belize	7–0	14–0	2013 Central American Games
15.	8 March 2013	Estadio Ernesto Rohrmoser, San José, Costa Rica	Nicaragua	3–0	3–0	2013 Central American Games
16.	10 March 2013	Estadio Ernesto Rohrmoser, San José, Costa Rica	El Salvador	1–0	3–1	2013 Central American Games
17.	12 March 2013	Estadio Ernesto Rohrmoser, San José, Costa Rica	Panama	2–0	3–0	2013 Central American Games
18.	22 May 2014	Estadio Mateo Flores, Guatemala City, Guatemala	El Salvador	2–0	4–0	2014 CONCACAF Women's Championship qualification
19.	24 May 2014	Estadio Mateo Flores, Guatemala City, Guatemala	Nicaragua	1–0	3–0	2014 CONCACAF Women's Championship qualification
20.	26 May 2014	Estadio Mateo Flores, Guatemala City, Guatemala	Guatemala	2–0	3–0	2014 CONCACAF Women's Championship qualification
21.	26 May 2014	Estadio Mateo Flores, Guatemala City, Guatemala	Guatemala	3–0	3–0	2014 CONCACAF Women's Championship qualification
22.	18 October 2014	Toyota Park, Bridgeview, United States	Jamaica	2–1	2–1	2014 CONCACAF Women's Championship
23.	9 June 2015	Olympic Stadium, Montreal, Canada	Spain	1–1	1–1	2015 FIFA Women's World Cup
24.	13 February 2016	Toyota Stadium, Frisco, United States	Puerto Rico	2–0	9–0	2016 CONCACAF Women's Olympic Qualifying Championship
25.	13 February 2016	Toyota Stadium, Frisco, United States	Puerto Rico	6–0	9–0	2016 CONCACAF Women's Olympic Qualifying Championship
26.	13 February 2016	Toyota Stadium, Frisco, United States	Puerto Rico	9–0	9–0	2016 CONCACAF Women's Olympic Qualifying Championship
27.	15 February 2016	Toyota Stadium, Frisco, United States	Mexico	1–0	2–1	2016 CONCACAF Women's Olympic Qualifying Championship
28.	15 February 2016	Toyota Stadium, Frisco, United States	Mexico	2–0	2–1	2016 CONCACAF Women's Olympic Qualifying Championship
29.	19 February 2016	BBVA Compass Stadium, Houston, United States	Canada	1–2	1–3	2016 CONCACAF Women's Olympic Qualifying Championship
30.	27 August 2018	IMG Academy, Bradenton, United States	El Salvador	6–0	11–0	2018 CONCACAF Women's Championship qualification
31.	29 August 2018	IMG Academy, Bradenton, United States	Nicaragua	2–0	4–1	2018 CONCACAF Women's Championship qualification
32.	31 August 2018	IMG Academy, Bradenton, United States	Panama	1–0	3–1	2018 CONCACAF Women's Championship qualification
33.	31 August 2018	IMG Academy, Bradenton, United States	Panama	2–0	3–1	2018 CONCACAF Women's Championship qualification
34.	31 July 2019	Estadio Universidad San Marcos, Lima, Peru	Peru	1–1	3–1	2019 Pan American Games
35.	31 July 2019	Estadio Universidad San Marcos, Lima, Peru	Peru	3–1	3–1	2019 Pan American Games
36.	8 October 2019	Estadio Alejandro Morera Soto, Alajuela, Costa Rica	El Salvador	1–0	5–0	2020 CONCACAF Women's Olympic Qualifying Championship qualification
37.	8 October 2019	Estadio Alejandro Morera Soto, Alajuela, Costa Rica	El Salvador	2–0	5–0	2020 CONCACAF Women's Olympic Qualifying Championship qualification
38.	28 January 2020	BBVA Stadium, Houston, United States	Panama	2–0	6–1	2020 CONCACAF Women's Olympic Qualifying Championship
39.	31 January 2020	BBVA Stadium, Houston, United States	Haiti	1–0	2–0	2020 CONCACAF Women's Olympic Qualifying Championship
40.	31 January 2020	BBVA Stadium, Houston, United States	Haiti	2–0	2–0	2020 CONCACAF Women's Olympic Qualifying Championship
41.	22 September 2021	Estadio Nacional, San José, Costa Rica	Panama	2–3	2–3	Friendly
42.	30 November 2021	Estadio Nacional, San José, Costa Rica	Nicaragua	4–2	5–2	Friendly
43.	17 February 2022	Estadio Nacional, San José, Costa Rica	Saint Kitts and Nevis	6–0	7–0	2022 CONCACAF W Championship qualification
44.	20 February 2022	Bethlehem Soccer Stadium, Saint Croix, US Virgin Islands	U.S. Virgin Islands	2–0	6–0	2022 CONCACAF W Championship qualification
45.	20 February 2022	Bethlehem Soccer Stadium, Saint Croix, US Virgin Islands	U.S. Virgin Islands	4–0	6–0	2022 CONCACAF W Championship qualification
46.	9 April 2022	Stadion Rignaal Jean Francisca, Willemstad, Curaçao	Curaçao	1–0	4–0	2022 CONCACAF W Championship qualification
47.	9 April 2022	Stadion Rignaal Jean Francisca, Willemstad, Curaçao	Curaçao	2–0	4–0	2022 CONCACAF W Championship qualification
48.	9 April 2022	Stadion Rignaal Jean Francisca, Willemstad, Curaçao	Curaçao	4–0	4–0	2022 CONCACAF W Championship qualification
49.	5 July 2022	Estadio BBVA, Guadalupe, Mexico	Panama	1–0	3–0	2022 CONCACAF W Championship
50.	11 October 2022	Estadio Ricardo Saprissa Aymá, San José, Costa Rica	Philippines	1–1	2–1	Friendly
51.	6 April 2023	Stadion Miejski im. Władysława Króla, Łódź, Poland	Poland	1–1	1–2	Friendly
52.	25 September 2023	Estadio Alejandro Morera Soto, Alajuela, Costa Rica	Saint Kitts and Nevis	3–0	11–0	2024 CONCACAF W Gold Cup qualification
53.	25 September 2023	Estadio Alejandro Morera Soto, Alajuela, Costa Rica	Saint Kitts and Nevis	8–0	11–0	2024 CONCACAF W Gold Cup qualification
54.	4 December 2023	SKNFA Technical Center, Basseterre, Saint Kitts and Nevis	Saint Kitts and Nevis	11–0	19–0	2024 CONCACAF W Gold Cup qualification
55.	6 April 2024	Estadio Alejandro Morera Soto, Alajuela, Costa Rica	Peru	1–0	5–1	Friendly
56.	10 April 2026	Estadio Alejandro Morera Soto, Alajuela, Costa Rica	Cayman Islands	4–0	21–0	2026 CONCACAF W Championship qualification
57.	10 April 2026	Estadio Alejandro Morera Soto, Alajuela, Costa Rica	Cayman Islands	6–0	21–0	2026 CONCACAF W Championship qualification
58.	10 April 2026	Estadio Alejandro Morera Soto, Alajuela, Costa Rica	Cayman Islands	12–0	21–0	2026 CONCACAF W Championship qualification

== Honors and awards ==
Penn State Nittany Lions

- NCAA Division I Women's Soccer Championship: 2015

Kansas City Current

- NWSL Championship: 2026
- NWSL Shield: 2025

Portland Thorns FC

- NWSL Championship: 2022
- NWSL Shield: 2021
- NWSL Challenge Cup: 2021
- NWSL Community Shield: 2020
- International Champions Cup: 2021

Individual

- NWSL Rookie of the Year: 2016

== See also ==
- List of women's footballers with 100 or more international caps
