= Kimmy Albeño =

American-born Guatemalan footballer

Personal information
- Full name: Kimberly Sophia Albeño Hinestroza
- Date of birth: 8 June 1993 (age 33)
- Place of birth: Long Beach, California, United States
- Height: 1.63 m (5 ft 4 in)
- Positions: Forward; midfielder

Team information
- Current team: FC Borntal Erfurt
- Number: 24

Youth career
- Slammers FC
- Woodrow Wilson HS Los Angeles

College career
Years	Team	Apps	(Gls)
2011–2014	Lamar Lady Cardinals	74	(34)

Senior career*
Years	Team	Apps	(Gls)
2019	1. FFV Erfurt		

International career^{‡}
2013–	Guatemala	5	(4)
- * Club domestic league appearances and goals as of 6 October 2019 ‡ National team caps and goals as of 22 September 2019

Kimberly Sophia Albeño Hinestroza (born 8 June 1993), known as Kimmy Albeño, is an American-born Guatemalan footballer who plays as a forward for German club FC Borntal Erfurt and the Guatemala women's national team.

== International goals ==
Scores and results list Guatemala's goal tally first

No.	Date	Venue	Opponent	Score	Result	Competition
1	6 March 2013	Estadio Ernesto Rohrmoser, San José, Costa Rica	Panama	1–0	3–2	2013 Central American Games
2	6 March 2013	Estadio Ernesto Rohrmoser, San José, Costa Rica	Panama	3–0	3–2	2013 Central American Games
3	15 March 2013	San José, Costa Rica	Panama	3–2	5–3	2013 Central American Games
4	6 October 2019	Estadio Rommel Fernández, Panama City, Panama	Honduras	4–0	4–0	2020 CONCACAF Women's Olympic Qualifying Championship qualification

== See also ==
- List of Guatemala women's international footballers
