= Norma Portillo =

Salvadoran footballer (born 1992)

Personal information
- Full name: Norma Beatriz Portillo Chévez
- Date of birth: 11 February 1992 (age 34)
- Position: Defender

International career
Years	Team	Apps	(Gls)
2009–2011	El Salvador U20	5	(1)
2010–2013	El Salvador	6	(1)

Norma Beatriz Portillo Chévez (born 11 February 1992) is a Salvadoran footballer who plays as a defender. She has been a member of El Salvador women's national team.

== International career ==
Ramírez capped for El Salvador at senior level during the 2010 CONCACAF Women's World Cup Qualifying qualification, the 2012 CONCACAF Women's Olympic Qualifying Tournament qualification and the 2013 Central American Games.

=== International goals ===
Scores and results list El Salvador's goal tally first.

No.	Date	Venue	Opponent	Score	Result	Competition	Ref.
1	10 March 2013	Estadio Ernesto Rohrmoser, San José, Costa Rica	Costa Rica	1–1	1–3	2013 Central American Games	

== See also ==
- List of El Salvador women's international footballers
