= Payés =

Payés is a surname. Notable people with the surname include:

- David Munguía Payés (active 2009-), Salvadoran general and politician
- Liliana Payés (born 1995), Salvadoran footballer
- Rita Payés (born 1999), Spanish musician

== See also ==
- Rachel Cosgrove Payes (1922-1998), American novelist
