= Vilma López =

Guatemalan footballer

Personal information
- Full name: Vilma Raquel López de Paz
- Date of birth: 4 September 1989 (age 37)
- Position: Forward

Senior career*
Years	Team	Apps	(Gls)
- Amatitlán

International career^{‡}
2013	Guatemala	4	(2)
- * Club domestic league appearances and goals ‡ National team caps and goals as of 20 October 2014.

Vilma Raquel López de Paz (born 4 September 1989) is a Guatemalan footballer who plays as a forward. She has been a member of the Guatemala women's national team.

== Club career ==
López has played for Amatitlán in Guatemala.

== International career ==
López capped for Guatemala at senior level during the 2013 Central American Games. She was also called up to the 2014 CONCACAF Women's Championship, but did not play any match.

=== International goals ===
Scores and results list Equatorial Guinea's goal tally first

No.	Date	Venue	Opponent	Score	Result	Competition	Ref.
1	10 March 2013	Estadio Ernesto Rohrmoser, San José, Costa Rica	Honduras	2–0	6–2	2013 Central American Games	
2	10 March 2013	Estadio Ernesto Rohrmoser, San José, Costa Rica	Honduras	4–2	6–2	2013 Central American Games	
