= Football at the 1997 Central American Games =

Tournament details
- Host country: Honduras
- Dates: December 1997
- Teams: 7 (from 1 confederation)
- Venue: 1 (in 1 host city)

Final positions
- Champions: Costa Rica (1st title)
- Runners-up: Panama
- Third place: Honduras
- Fourth place: El Salvador

Tournament statistics
- Matches played: 13
- Goals scored: 43 (3.31 per match)
- All statistics correct as of 14 December 1997.

The games were played in San Pedro Sula, Honduras during December 1997.

== Teams ==
| Team | App. | Previous best |
|---|---|---|
| Belize | 2nd | Group stage (1994) |
| Costa Rica | 4th | Silver medal (1990) |
| El Salvador | 5th | Gold medal (1977) |
| Guatemala | 5th | Gold medal (1986) |
| Honduras | 4th | Gold medal (1990, 1994) |
| Nicaragua | 6th | Silver medal (1973) |
| Panama | 3rd | Gold medal (1973) |

== Group stage ==
=== Group A ===
| Pos | Team | Pld | W | D | L | GF | GA | GD | Pts | Qualification |
|---|---|---|---|---|---|---|---|---|---|---|
| 1 | El Salvador | 2 | 2 | 0 | 0 | 4 | 1 | +3 | 6 | Advance to semi-final |
| 2 | Honduras | 2 | 1 | 0 | 1 | 5 | 3 | +2 | 3 | Advance to semi-final |
| 3 | Nicaragua | 2 | 0 | 0 | 2 | 3 | 8 | −5 | 0 | |

7 December 1997

| Honduras | 5–2 | Nicaragua |
|---|---|---|
| de León |

December 1997

| El Salvador | 3–1 | Nicaragua |

December 1997

| El Salvador | 1–0 | Honduras |

=== Group B ===
| Pos | Team | Pld | W | D | L | GF | GA | GD | Pts | Qualification |
|---|---|---|---|---|---|---|---|---|---|---|
| 1 | Costa Rica | 3 | 3 | 0 | 0 | 10 | 2 | +8 | 9 | Advance to semi-final |
| 2 | Panama | 3 | 2 | 0 | 1 | 10 | 4 | +6 | 6 | Advance to semi-final |
| 3 | Guatemala | 3 | 1 | 0 | 2 | 4 | 5 | −1 | 3 | |
| 4 | Belize | 3 | 0 | 0 | 3 | 0 | 13 | −13 | 0 | |

7 December 1997

| Costa Rica | 4–0 | Belize |
|---|---|---|
| Bennett |

December 1997

| Guatemala | 2–0 | Belize |

December 1997

| Costa Rica | 3–1 | Panama |

December 1997

| Panama | 2–1 | Guatemala |

December 1997

| Costa Rica | 3–1 | Guatemala |

December 1997

| Belize | 0–7 | Panama |

== Semi-finals ==
December 1997

| El Salvador | 1–2 | Panama |

December 1997

| Costa Rica | 0–0 | Honduras |
Penalties
| | 5–3 |

== Third place match ==
December 1997

| Honduras | 1–0 | El Salvador |

== Final ==
14 December 1997

| Costa Rica | 2–1 | Panama |
|---|---|---|
| Jewisson Bennett 43' (pen.); Kervin Lacey 60' | Report | Ángel Luis Rodríguez 28' |

Estadio Olímpico Metropolitano, San Pedro Sula
Referee: Pascual Rebolledo (Mexico)

| GK | Ricardo González |
| DF | Jervis Drummond |
| DF | Pablo Chinchilla |
| DF | Douglas Sequeira |
| DF | Alfredo Morales |
| MF | Carlos Castro Mora | | (substituted off) 80' |
| MF | Ríchar Mahoney |
| MF | Walter Centeno |
| MF | Jorge León | | (substituted off) 55' |
| FW | Jewisson Bennett |
| FW | Kervin Lacey | Sent off (straight red) |
Substitutions:
| MF | Steven Bryce | | (substituted on) 55' |
| DF | Wálter Cordero | | (substituted on) 80' |
Manager:
Rolando Villalobos

| GK | David Marciaga | Sent off (straight red) |
| DF | Oniel Vergara | | (substituted off) 70' |
| DF | Dariel Gómez |
| DF | Jairzinho Serrano |
| DF | Ubaldo Guardia | | (substituted off) 42' |
| MF | Ángel Luis Rodríguez |
| MF | Julio Medina III |
| MF | Mario Méndez |
| MF | Alberto Blanco |
| FW | Roberto Brown |
| FW | Omar Tejada | | (substituted off) 62' |
Substitutions:
| GK | Omar Liguas | | (substituted on) 42' |
| FW | Alfredo Anderson | | (substituted on) 62' |
| DF | David Paschal | | (substituted on) 70' |
Manager:
Gary Stempel

Assistant referees:
Raúl Cárdenas (El Salvador)
Reynaldo Salinas (Honduras)
