= Ubaldo Guardia =

Panamanian footballer (born 1977)

Personal information
- Full name: Ubaldo Gustavo Guardia Ledezma
- Date of birth: June 8, 1977 (age 49)
- Place of birth: Panama
- Position: Defender

Senior career*
| Years | Team | Apps | (Gls) |
| 1998–2002 | Tauro | | |
| 2002–2004 | Sheriff Tiraspol | 4 | (0) |
| 2005–2008 | Tauro | | |

International career^{‡}
| 2000–2007 | Panama | 41 | (0) |
- * Club domestic league appearances and goals ‡ National team caps and goals as of 15 August 2015

Ubaldo Gustavo Guardia Ledezma (born 8 June 1977) is a retired Panamanian football defender.

== Club career ==
Tito Guardia started his career at Tauro, then moved to Europe to play for Moldovan champions Sheriff Tiraspol where he played alongside compatriot Alberto Blanco. He only returned to Tauro in 2005 after problems with his release by Sheriff. In May 2006 he was reported to be a new player for Colombian side Real Cartagena.

In February 2007, Guardia suffered a broken fibula and ruptured ankle ligaments in his left inner leg after a tackle by Chepo's captain Armando Gun. The injury was said to leave him out of the game for over 4 months.

== International career ==
He played for the Panama U23 team in the 1997 Central American Games.

Guardia made his debut for Panama in a January 2000 friendly match against Guatemala and has earned a total of 41 caps, scoring no goals. He represented his country in 8 FIFA World Cup qualification matches and was a member of the 2005 CONCACAF Gold Cup team, who finished second in the tournament.

His final international was a February 2007 UNCAF Nations Cup match against Guatemala.

== Honours ==
Panama

- CONCACAF Gold Cup runner-up: 2005
