= Liliana Payés =

Salvadoran footballer (born 1995)

Personal information
- Full name: Delmy Liliana Payés Vásquez
- Date of birth: 21 April 1995 (age 31)
- Place of birth: Coatepeque, El Salvador
- Position: Forward

Team information
- Current team: Alianza
- Number: 21

Senior career*
Years	Team	Apps	(Gls)
2014–2016	Santa Tecla		
2016–201?	Legends		
201?–	Alianza		(14+)

International career^{‡}
2017	El Salvador	1	(1)
- * Club domestic league appearances and goals ‡ National team caps and goals as of 14 December 2017.

Delmy Liliana Payés Vásquez (born 21 April 1995), known as Liliana Payés, is a Salvadoran footballer who plays as a forward for Alianza FC. She has been a member of El Salvador women's national team.

== Early life ==
Payés was born in Coatepeque.

== Club career ==
Payés has played for Santa Tecla FC, Legends FC and Alianza in El Salvador. She scored 14 goals for the latter during the 2019 Apertura.

== International career ==
Payés capped for El Salvador at senior level during the 2017 Central American Games.

=== International goals ===
Scores and results list El Salvador's goal tally first.

No.	Date	Venue	Opponent	Score	Result	Competition	Ref.
1	14 December 2017	Estadio Independencia, Estelí, Nicaragua	Panama	1–0	1–1	2017 Central American Games	

== See also ==
- List of El Salvador women's international footballers
