= Nicaragua women's national football team =

Women's national football team representing Nicaragua

Nicaragua
- Nickname(s): La Azul y Blanco; Las Pinoleras; Albiazules
- Association: Federación Nicaragüense de Fútbol (FENIFUT)
- Head coach: Jaime Ruiz
- Top scorer: Yessenia Flores (30)
- FIFA code: NCA
First colours	Second colours

FIFA ranking
- Current: 96 ▼1 (16 June 2026)
- Highest: 86 (July 2003)
- Lowest: 124 (September 2019)

First international
- Guatemala 5–0 Nicaragua (Guatemala, 22 May 2000)

Biggest win
- Nicaragua 19–0 Turks and Caicos Islands (Managua, Nicaragua; 22 February 2022)

Biggest defeat
- El Salvador 18–1 Nicaragua (Guatemala; 28 July 2004)

The Nicaragua women's national football team (Spanish: selección femenina de fútbol de Nicaragua) represents Nicaragua in international women's football, and is controlled by the Nicaraguan Football Federation.

== Results and fixtures ==
The following is a list of match results in the last 12 months, as well as any future matches that have been scheduled.

Legend

Win Draw Lose Fixture

- Nicaragua Results and Fixtures – Soccerway.com
- Nicaragua Results and Fixtures – FIFA.com

=== 2025 ===
27 November 2025 2026 CONCACAF W Championship Q	Antigua and Barbuda	0–4	Nicaragua	St. John’s
16:00 UTC−4		Report (FIFA); Report (CONCACAF)	Silva 10'; Flores 19'; Aguilar 31'; Lee 85'	Stadium: Sir Vivian Richards Stadium; Referee: Francia González (Mexico)

1 December 2025 2026 CONCACAF W Championship Q	Guyana	1–3	Nicaragua	West Coast Demerara
20:00 UTC−4	Vincent 18'	Report (FIFA); Report (CONCACAF)	Flores 3'; Márquez 35'; Aguilar 49'	Stadium: Leonora National Track & Field Center; Referee: Diana Pérez (Mexico)

== Coaching staff ==
=== Current coaching staff ===
'Updated as 14 July 2024

Position	Staff
Head coach	(Nicaragua) Jaime Ruiz
Assistant coach	(Nicaragua) Fabiola Martinez
Goalkeeping trainer	(Nicaragua) Oscar Ortiz
Team doctor	(Nicaragua) Dr. Jaime Izaguirre
Physio	(Nicaragua) Jessie Castillo

=== Manager history ===
- (Nicaragua) Elna Dixon (2006–2007)
- (Nicaragua) Henry Alvarado (2007 – February 2011)
- (Nicaragua) Óscar Blanco (March 2011 – June 2011)
- (Brazil) Ederlei Aparecido Pereira Pedroso (June 2011 – June 2013)
- (Nicaragua) Jeniffer Fernández (June 2013 – October 2014) first woman appointed as coach of the national team
- (Spain) Antonio Macías (October 2014 – March 2015)
- (Nicaragua) Elna Dixon (second term) (March 2015–???)
- (Brazil) Dorival Bueno (???-December 2024)
- (Nicaragua) Jaime Ruiz (January 2025–present)

== Players ==
=== Current squad ===
- The following players were named to the squad to play a friendly match against Panama on 14 July 2024.

Caps and goals as of 22 February 2022

No.	Pos.	Player	Date of birth (age)	Caps	Goals	Club
1	GK	Lorena Gutiérrez (captain)	11 March 1990 (age 36)	3	0	(Nicaraguan Football Federation) UNAN Managua
12	GK	Jessica Madriz	27 March 2001 (age 25)		0	(Nicaraguan Football Federation) Somotillo
2	DF	Erica Cunningham	25 March 1993 (age 33)			(Football Association of Ireland) Athlone Town
3	DF	Lisbeth Moreno	6 August 2000 (age 26)			(Nicaraguan Football Federation) Somotillo
4	DF	María Rivas	4 August 2003 (age 23)			(Nicaraguan Football Federation) UNAN Managua
6	DF	Vanessa Altamirano	3 July 2006 (age 20)			(Nicaraguan Football Federation) Diriangén
13	DF	Yorcelly Humphreys	3 September 2001 (age 25)	6	1	(Lithuanian Football Federation) FK TransINVEST
15	DF	Stella Villalta	27 October 2005 (age 20)			(United States Soccer Federation) Santa Clara Broncos
21	DF	Katrina Zelaya				(Nicaraguan Football Federation) Somotillo
22	DF	Ana Mendoza				(Nicaraguan Football Federation) Diriangén
5	MF	Ninoska Solís	26 February 1993 (age 33)			(Nicaraguan Football Federation) UNAN Managua
8	MF	Tania Centeno	7 May 1997 (age 29)			(Nicaraguan Football Federation) Somotillo
11	MF	Yansy Aguirre	18 February 1991 (age 35)			(Nicaraguan Football Federation) Somotillo
14	MF	Doriana Aguilar	2 January 1994 (age 32)			(Nicaraguan Football Federation) Somotillo
19	MF	Reyna Hernández	30 May 1998 (age 28)			(Nicaraguan Football Federation) UNAN Managua
23	MF	Adriana Munguía	12 May 2006 (age 20)			(Nicaraguan Football Federation) Zacarías Guerra
7	FW	Niurka Molina	11 June 2003 (age 23)			(Nicaraguan Football Federation) Somotillo
9	FW	Mayqueling Márquez	20 February 2000 (age 26)	3	1	(Panamanian Football Federation) Santa Fé
10	FW	Hannah Lee	28 October 2000 (age 25)			(Hellenic Football Federation) Kifisia
16	FW	Hormyne Paiz	22 July 1999 (age 27)			(Nicaraguan Football Federation) Pedro Joaquín
20	FW	Inés Navarrete	3 January 2004 (age 22)			(Nicaraguan Football Federation) Real Estelí

=== Recent call-ups ===
Pos.	Player	Date of birth (age)	Caps	Goals	Club	Latest call-up

=== Notable players ===
- Ana Cate
- Lena Elizabeth Torres Tapia
- Alina Nalgado

== Competitive record ==
=== FIFA Women's World Cup ===
FIFA Women's World Cup record
Year	Result	Pld	W	D*	L	GF	GA
(China) 1991	Did not enter						
(Sweden) 1995	Did not enter						
(United States) 1999	Did not enter						
(United States) 2003	Did not enter						
(China) 2007	Did not qualify						
(Germany) 2011	Did not qualify						
(Canada) 2015	Did not qualify						
(France) 2019	Did not qualify						
(Australia) (New Zealand) 2023	Did not qualify						
(Brazil) 2027	Did not qualify						
(Costa Rica) (Jamaica) (Mexico) (United States) 2031	To be determined						
(United Kingdom) 2035	To be determined						
Total	–	–	–	–	–	–	–

*Draws include knockout matches decided on penalty kicks.

=== Olympic Games ===
Summer Olympics record									Qualifying record					
Year	Result	Position	Pld	W	D*	L	GF	GA	Pld	W	D*	L	GF	GA
(United States) 1996	Did not enter								1995 FIFA WWC					
(Australia) 2000	Did not qualify								1999 FIFA WWC					
(Greece) 2004	Did not qualify								2	0	0	2	0	9
(China) 2008	Did not qualify								4	2	0	2	5	10
(United Kingdom) 2012	Did not qualify								4	0	0	4	1	13
(Brazil) 2016	Did not qualify								3	0	0	3	1	8
(Japan) 2020	Did not qualify								2	1	0	1	2	3
(France) 2024	Did not qualify								2022 CONCACAF W Championship					
(United States) 2028	Did not qualify								2026 CONCACAF W Championship					
Total	–	–	–	–	–	–	–	–	15	3	0	12	9	43

*Draws include knockout matches decided on penalty kicks.

=== CONCACAF W Championship ===
CONCACAF W Championship record								Qualification record					
Year	Result	Pld	W	D*	L	GF	GA	Pld	W	D*	L	GF	GA
(Haiti) 1991	Did not enter							Did not enter					
(United States) 1993	Did not enter							Did not enter					
(Canada) 1994	Did not enter							Did not enter					
(Canada) 1998	Did not enter							Did not enter					
(United States) 2000	Did not qualify							3	1	0	2	4	16
(United States) (Canada) 2002	Withdrew							Withdrew					
(United States) 2006	Did not qualify							2	1	0	1	2	10
(Mexico) 2010	Did not qualify							2	1	0	1	2	3
(United States) 2014	Did not qualify							2	0	0	2	0	5
(United States) 2018	Did not qualify							3	0	1	2	3	10
(Mexico) 2022	Did not qualify							4	2	1	1	30	2
(United States) 2026	Did not qualify							4	3	0	1	23	4
Total	–	–	–	–	–	–	–	20	8	2	10	64	50

*Draws include knockout matches decided on penalty kicks.

=== CONCACAF W Gold Cup ===
CONCACAF W Gold Cup record								Qualification record							
Year	Result	GP	W	D*	L	GF	GA	Division	Group	GP	W	D*	L	GF	GA
(United States) 2024	Did not qualify							B	B	6	1	2	3	5	11
(N/A) 2029	To be determined							To be determined							
Total	–	–	–	–	–	–	–	–	–	6	1	2	3	5	11

*Draws include knockout matches decided on penalty kicks.

=== Pan American Games ===
Pan American Games record
Year	Result	Pld	W	D*	L	GF	GA
(Canada) 1999	Did not enter						
(Dominican Republic) 2003	Did not enter						
(Brazil) 2007	Did not enter						
(Mexico) 2011	Did not qualify						
(Canada) 2015	Did not qualify						
(Peru) 2019	Did not qualify						
(Chile) 2023	Did not qualify						
Total	–	–	–	–	–	–	–

*Draws include knockout matches decided on penalty kicks.

=== Central American and Caribbean Games ===
Central American and Caribbean Games record
Year	Result	Pld	W	D*	L	GF	GA
(Puerto Rico) 2010	Sixth place	5	0	1	4	3	13
(Mexico) 2014	Group stage	3	1	0	2	1	6
(Colombia) 2018	Group stage	3	1	1	1	5	6
(El Salvador) 2023	Did not enter						
Total	Group stage	11	2	2	7	9	25

*Draws include knockout matches decided on penalty kicks.

=== Central American Games ===
Central American Games record
Year	Result	Pld	W	D*	L	GF	GA
(Guatemala) 2001	Group stage	2	0	0	2	1	10
(Costa Rica) 2013	Silver medal	5	3	0	2	7	10
(Nicaragua) 2017	Silver medal	5	2	2	1	7	7
(El Salvador) 2022	Cancelled						
(Guatemala) 2025	Fourth Place	4	1	1	2	3	7
Total	Silver medal	16	6	3	7	18	34

*Draws include knockout matches decided on penalty kicks.

== Honours ==
=== Regional ===
- Central American Games

Silver Medalists (2): 2013, 2017
