= Football at the 1994 Central American Games =

Tournament details
- Host country: El Salvador
- Dates: 15–22 January 1994
- Teams: 6 (from 1 confederation)
- Venue(s): 1 (in 1 host city)

Final positions
- Champions: Honduras (2nd title)
- Runners-up: El Salvador
- Third place: Costa Rica
- Fourth place: Guatemala

Tournament statistics
- Matches played: 8
- Goals scored: 46 (5.75 per match)
- All statistics correct as of 22 January 1994.

Tournament for U-21 teams, played in San Salvador, 15–22 January 1994.

== Teams ==
Team	App.	Previous best
Belize	1st	–
Costa Rica	3rd	Silver medal (1990)
El Salvador	4th	Gold medal (1977)
Guatemala	4th	Gold medal (1986)
Honduras	3rd	Gold medal (1990)
Nicaragua	5th	Silver medal (1973)

== Group stage ==
=== Group A ===
Pos	Team	Pld	W	D	L	GF	GA	GD	Pts	Qualification or relegation
1	El Salvador	2	2	0	0	11	0	+11	4	Qualified to Final
2	Guatemala	2	1	0	1	10	4	+6	2	Qualified to Third Place Match
3	Nicaragua	2	0	0	2	0	17	−17	0	Eliminated

15 January 1994	El Salvador	7–0	Nicaragua	San Salvador, El Salvador
CST

17 January 1994	Guatemala	10–0	Nicaragua	San Salvador, El Salvador
CST

19 January 1994	El Salvador	4–0	Guatemala	San Salvador, El Salvador
CST

=== Group B ===
Pos	Team	Pld	W	D	L	GF	GA	GD	Pts	Qualification or relegation
1	Honduras	2	2	0	0	14	3	+11	4	Qualified to Final
2	Costa Rica	2	1	0	1	7	5	+2	2	Qualified to Third Place Match
3	Belize	2	0	0	2	0	13	−13	0	Eliminated

15 January 1994	Belize	0–4	Costa Rica	San Salvador, El Salvador
CST

17 January 1994	Belize	0–9	Honduras	San Salvador, El Salvador
CST

19 January 1994	Costa Rica	3–5	Honduras	San Salvador, El Salvador
CST

== Third place match ==
22 January 1994	Costa Rica	1–1 (4–2 p)	Guatemala	San Salvador, El Salvador
CST

== Final ==
22 January 1994	El Salvador	1–2	Honduras	San Salvador, El Salvador
CST
