= Honduras women's national football team =

Women's national football team representing Honduras

Honduras
- Nickname(s): Las Catrachas; La H Femenina
- Association: Federación de Fútbol de Honduras
- Confederation: CONCACAF (North America)
- Head coach: Mario Abadía
- FIFA code: HON
First colours	Second colours

FIFA ranking
- Current: 126 (16 June 2026)
- Highest: 83 (July 2003)
- Lowest: 128 (December 2025)

First international
- Guatemala 11–0 Honduras (Guatemala City, Guatemala; 19 July 1998)

Biggest win
- Honduras 8–0 Belize (Guatemala City, Guatemala; 20 May 2014)

Biggest defeat
- Costa Rica 12–0 Honduras (Guatemala; 10 June 1999)

The Honduras women's national football team (Spanish: selection femenina de fútbol de Honduras) represents Honduras in international women's football. The team is overseen by the Football Federation of Honduras. Honduras is allowed to participate at the different UNCAF and CONCACAF women's tournaments; as well to the FIFA Women's World Cup, although they haven't been able to qualify as of yet.

== History ==
Although Honduras did not qualify for the 2015 FIFA Women's World Cup, the Catrachas scored 8 goals against Belize in 2014, setting a record for most goals scored by the national women's team in a full international match. The final score was 8–0, with Jenny Alarcón scoring four goals.

== Results and fixtures ==
The following is a list of match results in the last 12 months, as well as any future matches that have been scheduled.

Legend

Win Draw Lose Fixture

=== 2025 ===
2 December 2025 2025/2026 CONCACAF Qualifiers	El Salvador	3-0	Honduras	San Salvador, El Salvador
15:30 UTC−5	Fuentes 5'; Lopez 49'; Meza 92'	Report (FIFA); Report (CONCACAF)		Stadium: Estadio Jorge "El Mágico" González; Attendance: 8,000; Referee: Natalie Simon (United States)

- Honduras Results and Fixtures – Soccerway.com
- Honduras Results and Fixtures – FIFA.com

== Players ==
=== Current squad ===
- The following players were named to the squad for the 2026 CONCACAF W Championship qualification matches in December 2025.

No.	Pos.	Player	Date of birth (age)	Caps	Goals	Club
1	GK	María Jiménez	26 January 2009 (age 17)			(National Autonomous Federation of Football of Honduras) Olimpia
12	GK	Nathalie Urrutia	20 March 2007 (age 19)			(National Autonomous Federation of Football of Honduras) Unitec
22	GK	Madelinne Nieto	3 January 1999 (age 27)			(Ecuadorian Football Federation) Universidad Católica
2	DF	Iveth Ramos	20 December 2005 (age 20)			(National Autonomous Federation of Football of Honduras) Marathón
4	DF	Bárbara Murillo (captain)	24 December 1994 (age 31)	2	0	(United States Soccer Federation) Miami Grove FC
6	DF	Johana Espinal	21 September 1994 (age 32)	2	0	(United States Soccer Federation) Miami Grove FC
13	DF	Sheylla Cortez	11 September 2006 (age 20)			(National Autonomous Federation of Football of Honduras) Motagua
18	DF	Yensi Ferrera	24 July 2008 (age 18)			(National Autonomous Federation of Football of Honduras) A.D. Soledad
19	DF	Evelin Ordóñez	8 February 2008 (age 18)			(National Autonomous Federation of Football of Honduras) Fénix PSG
20	DF	Caterin Rápalo	18 June 2007 (age 19)			(United States Soccer Federation) Under FC
7	MF	Ashley Flores				(United States Soccer Federation) Concord Fire
8	MF	Débora Tobías	2 May 2000 (age 26)			(National Autonomous Federation of Football of Honduras) FC Zamora
10	MF	Karla Cálix	27 November 2005 (age 20)			(National Autonomous Federation of Football of Honduras) Somotillo FC
11	MF	Riccy Hernández	26 July 1991 (age 35)			(National Autonomous Federation of Football of Honduras) Somotillo FC
14	MF	Jazlyn Sánchez	15 December 2009 (age 16)			(National Autonomous Federation of Football of Honduras) Policia Nacional FC
15	MF	Kerin Villalobos				(United States Soccer Federation) Baton Rouge Soccer Club
16	MF	Larissa Arias	7 October 2005 (age 21)			(National Football Federation of Guatemala) Cuilco Femenil
17	MF	Natalia García	4 January 2008 (age 18)			(United States Soccer Federation) Penn High School
21	MF	Alexandra Merriam				(United States Soccer Federation) Evolution / Evanston
9	FW	Denessis Santos	15 June 1998 (age 28)			(United States Soccer Federation) Baton Rouge Soccer Club
5	FW	Lesbia Puerto	24 October 2003 (age 22)			(United States Soccer Federation) University of New Mexico
23	FW	Tiffany Ávila				(United States Soccer Federation) Under FC
24	FW	Allyson Reed				(United States Soccer Federation) University of Texas Permian Basin

=== Recent call ups ===
Pos.	Player	Date of birth (age)	Caps	Goals	Club	Latest call-up

== Honours ==
=== Regional ===
- Central American Games

Silver Medalists (1): 2001

== Competitive record ==
=== FIFA Women's World Cup ===
FIFA Women's World Cup record
Year	Result	Pld	W	D*	L	GF	GA
(China) 1991	Did not enter						
(Sweden) 1995	Did not enter						
(United States) 1999	Did not qualify						
(United States) 2003	Did not qualify						
(China) 2007	Withdrew						
(Germany) 2011	Did not qualify						
(Canada) 2015	Did not qualify						
(France) 2019	Did not enter						
(Australia) (New Zealand) 2023	Did not qualify						
(Brazil) 2027	Did not qualify						
(Costa Rica) (Jamaica) (Mexico) (United States) 2031	To be determined						
(United Kingdom) 2035	To be determined						
Total	–	–	–	–	–	–	–

*Draws include knockout matches decided on penalty kicks.

=== Olympic Games ===
Summer Olympics record									Qualifying record					
Year	Result	Position	Pld	W	D*	L	GF	GA	Pld	W	D*	L	GF	GA
(United States) 1996	Did not enter								1995 FIFA WWC					
(Australia) 2000	Did not qualify								1999 FIFA WWC					
(Greece) 2004	Did not qualify								2	1	0	1	1	6
(China) 2008	Did not enter								Did not enter					
(United Kingdom) 2012	Did not qualify								4	1	0	3	3	13
(Brazil) 2016	Withdrew								Withdrew					
(Japan) 2020	Did not qualify								2	0	0	2	0	7
(France) 2024	Did not qualify								2022 CONCACAF W Championship					
(United States) 2028	Did not qualify								2026 CONCACAF W Championship					
Total	–	–	–	–	–	–	–	–	8	2	0	6	4	26

*Draws include knockout matches decided on penalty kicks.

=== CONCACAF W Championship ===
CONCACAF W Championship record								Qualification record					
Year	Result	Pld	W	D*	L	GF	GA	Pld	W	D*	L	GF	GA
(Haiti) 1991	Did not enter							Did not enter					
(United States) 1993	Did not enter							Did not enter					
(Canada) 1994	Did not enter							Did not enter					
(Canada) 1998	Did not qualify							2	0	1	1	1	12
(United States) 2000	Did not qualify							3	0	0	3	2	21
(United States) (Canada) 2002	Did not qualify							4	1	0	3	9	10
(United States) 2006	Withdrew							Withdrew					
(Mexico) 2010	Did not qualify							2	0	0	2	1	4
(United States) 2014	Did not qualify							3	1	0	2	11	7
(United States) 2018	Did not enter							Did not enter					
(Mexico) 2022	Did not qualify							4	2	1	1	6	7
(United States) 2026	Did not qualify							3	1	1	1	6	5
Total	–	–	–	–	–	–	–	21	5	3	13	36	66

*Draws include knockout matches decided on penalty kicks.

=== CONCACAF W Gold Cup ===
CONCACAF W Gold Cup record								Qualification record							
Year	Result	GP	W	D*	L	GF	GA	Division	Group	GP	W	D*	L	GF	GA
(United States) 2024	Did not qualify							B	B	6	1	1	4	5	13
(N/A) 2029	To be determined							To be determined							
Total	–	–	–	–	–	–	–	–	–	6	1	1	4	5	13

*Draws include knockout matches decided on penalty kicks.

=== Pan American Games ===
Pan American Games record
Year	Result	Pld	W	D*	L	GF	GA
(Canada) 1999	Did not enter						
(Dominican Republic) 2003	Did not enter						
(Brazil) 2007	Did not enter						
(Mexico) 2011	Did not qualify						
(Canada) 2015	Did not qualify						
(Peru) 2019	Did not qualify						
(Chile) 2023	Did not qualify						
Total	–	–	–	–	–	–	–

*Draws include knockout matches decided on penalty kicks.

=== Central American and Caribbean Games ===
Central American and Caribbean Games record
Year	Result	Pld	W	D*	L	GF	GA
(Puerto Rico) 2010	Did not enter						
(Mexico) 2014	Did not enter						
(Colombia) 2018	Did not enter						
(El Salvador) 2023	Did not enter						
Total	–	–	–	–	–	–	–

*Draws include knockout matches decided on penalty kicks.

=== Central American Games ===
Central American Games record
Year	Result	Pld	W	D*	L	GF	GA
(Guatemala) 2001	Siver medal	4	1	1	2	6	10
(Costa Rica) 2013	Group stage	2	0	0	2	4	9
(Nicaragua) 2017	Did not enter						
(El Salvador) 2022	Cancelled						
(Guatemala) 2025	Did not enter						
Total	1 Silver medal	6	1	1	4	10	19

*Draws include knockout matches decided on penalty kicks.

== See also ==
- Football in Honduras
