= El Salvador women's national football team =

Women's national football team representing El Salvador

El Salvador
- Nickname(s): La Selecta; Selección Cuscatleca; Las Cuscatlecas; La Azul
- Association: Salvadoran Football Federation
- Confederation: CONCACAF (North America)
- Sub-confederation: UNCAF (Central America)
- Head coach: Eric Acuña
- Top scorer: Brenda Cerén (26)
- FIFA code: SLV
First colours	Second colours

FIFA ranking
- Current: 78 (20 October 2026)
- Highest: 78 (April 2026)
- Lowest: 119 (December 2021)

First international
- El Salvador 1–1 Honduras (Guatemala; 21 July 1998)

Biggest win
- El Salvador 18–1 Nicaragua (Guatemala; 28 July 2004)

Biggest defeat
- Mexico 16–0 El Salvador (Mexico; 14 May 2000)

CONCACAF W Championship
- Appearances: 1 (first in 2026)

CONCACAF W Gold Cup
- Appearances: 1 (first in 2024)
- Best result: Group stage (2024)

The El Salvador women's national football team (Spanish: selección femenina de fútbol de El Salvador) represents El Salvador in international women's football. The team is governed by the Salvadoran Football Federation. El Salvador qualified for the CONCACAF W Championship for the first time in 2026.

== Results and fixtures ==
The following is a list of match results in the last 12 months, as well as any future matches that have been scheduled.

Legend

Win Draw Lose Fixture

=== 2025 ===
23 October 2025 2025 Central American Games	El Salvador	5–0	Panama	Guatemala City, Guatemala
13:00 UTC−5	Guitiérez 25', 62'; Cerén 45+1'; Magallón 53' (o.g.); Marinero 90+2'	Report		Stadium: Cementos Progreso Stadium

25 October 2025 2025 Central American Games	Costa Rica	1–0	El Salvador	Guatemala City, Guatemala
10:00 UTC−5	TBD			Stadium: Cementos Progreso Stadium

27 October 2025 2025 Central American Games	Nicaragua	0–2	El Salvador	Guatemala City, Guatemala
10:00 UTC−5			Amaya 41'; Cerén 68'	Stadium: Cementos Progreso Stadium

29 October 2025 2025 Central American Games	Costa Rica	1–0	El Salvador	Guatemala City, Guatemala
10:00 UTC−5	Varela 31'			Stadium: Cementos Progreso Stadium

2 December 2025 2025/2026 CONCACAF Qualifiers	El Salvador	3–0	Honduras	San Salvador, El Salvador
15:30 UTC−5	Fuentes 5'; Lopez 49'; Meza 92'	Report (FIFA); Report (CONCACAF)		Stadium: Estadio Jorge "El Mágico" González; Attendance: 8,000; Referee: Natalie Simon (United States)

=== 2026 ===
1 March 2026 CONCACAF Championship qualifying	El Salvador	13–0	Barbados	Santa Tecla
17:30	D. Fuentes 8', 34', 87'; Gutiérrez 17', 60'; Meza 31'; Cerén 35', 38', 72'; Gómez 53'; Dybala 64'; Velásquez 79', 90+4'	Report (FIFA)		Stadium: Estadio Las Delicias; Attendance: 4,811; Referee: Vimarest Díaz (Dominican Republic)

4 March Friendly	Peru	0–4	El Salvador	Chincha Alta, Peru
		Report (FESFUT)	Gutiérrez 11'; López 38'; Domínguez 58'; Plata 67'	Stadium: Estadio Félix Castillo Tardío

7 March Friendly	Peru	0–1	El Salvador	Chincha Alta, Peru
14:30			Johannes 49'	Stadium: Estadio Félix Castillo Tardío

17 April 2026 CONCACAF Championship qualifying	Trinidad and Tobago	0–2	El Salvador	Port of Spain, Trinidad and Tobago
		Report (FIFA)	Cerén 37', 51'	Stadium: Hasely Crawford Stadium

5 June Friendly	El Salvador	1–1	Costa Rica	Santa Tecla
20:00 UTC−6	Velásquez 80'	Report	Gilbertson 63'	Stadium: Estadio Las Delicias

9 June Friendly	Guatemala	1–5	El Salvador	Guatemala City, Guatemala
15:00 UTC−6	Solórzano 17'	Report	Gutiérrez 10'; Cerén 23', 35' (pen.); López 39'; Ulloa 53'	Stadium: Cementos Progreso Stadium

29 July 2026 Central American and Caribbean Games	El Salvador	1-0	Dominican Republic	Santo Domingo, Dominican Republic
--:-- UTC−6	Victoria Meza 57'		Nil

31 July 2026 Central American and Caribbean Games	Venezuela	2-0	El Salvador	Santo Domingo, Dominican Republic
--:-- UTC−6	Paola Villamizar 70'; Génesis Flórez 76'	Report	Nil

2 August 2026 Central American and Caribbean Games	Costa Rica	0-1	El Salvador	Santo Domingo, Dominican Republic
--:-- UTC−6		Report	Abagail López 54'

4 August 2026 Central American and Caribbean Games	Mexico	4-1	El Salvador	Santo Domingo, Dominican Republic
--:-- UTC−6	Lourdes Bosch 25'; Andrea Frías 91' 123'; Valerie Vargas 115'	Report	Yoselyn López 71'

6 August 2026 Central American and Caribbean Games	Venezuela	1-2	El Salvador	Santo Domingo, Dominican Republic
--:-- UTC−6	Paola Villamizar 89'	Report	Abigaíl López 27'; Victoria Meza 61'

10 October Friendly	El Salvador	1–5	Paraguay	San Salvador, El Salvador
19:30 CST (UTC−6)	López 23'	Report	González 28', 32'; Ayala 55'; Barbosa 66'; Sánchez 76'	Stadium: Cuscatlán Stadium

13 October Friendly	El Salvador	2–3	Paraguay	San Salvador, El Salvador
20:00 CST (UTC−6)	Cerén 23'; Gutiérrez 44'	Report	Ramos 55'; Ayala 58', 81'	Stadium: Cuscatlán Stadium

27 November 2026 CONCACAF W Championship QF	United States	v	El Salvador	Mansfield, United States
19:30 UTC−6				Stadium: Texas Health Mansfield Stadium

== Coaching staff ==
=== Current coaching staff ===
As of January 6, 2026

Position	Name	Nationality
Manager	Eric Acuña	El Salvador
Assistant manager	Hugo Escobar	Colombia
Goalkeeper coach	Fidel Mondragon	El Salvador
Strength/Conditioning Coach	Edgar Escobar	El Salvador

=== Manager history ===
- (Mexico) Julio César Ramos (2006–2008)
- (El Salvador) José Ricardo Herrera (2010–2011)
- (El Salvador) José de la Cruz Flores Barahona (2012–2013)
- (El Salvador) Giovanni Trigueros (2014)
- (El Salvador) José Ricardo Herrera (2015–2016)
- (El Salvador) Elmer Guidos (2018)
- (El Salvador) Debbie Gómez (2019 -November 2019)
- (El Salvador) Eric Acuña (November 2020–Present)

== Players ==
=== Current squad ===
- The following players were named to the squad to play in 2026 Central American and Caribbean Games on July 29 and August 2, 2026, respectively.

Caps and goals are updated as of 9 June 2026 after the match against Guatemala.

No.	Pos.	Player	Date of birth (age)	Caps	Goals	Club
1	GK	Idalia Serrano	22 September 1999 (age 27)	31	0	(Hellenic Football Federation) Volos
	GK	Natalie Navarro		0	0	(United States Soccer Federation) Hawaii Pacific Sharks
8	DF	Victoria Sánchez	22 January 2005 (age 21)	38	13	(United States Soccer Federation) Texas State Bobcats
24	DF	Sarina Villa	1 June 2006 (age 20)	2	0	(Mexican Football Federation) Santos Laguna
23	DF	Jasmine Dybala	19 May 2005 (age 21)	3	1	(United States Soccer Federation) Sam Houston Bearkats
5	DF	Nicolle Amaya	16 February 2003 (age 23)	36	2	(Argentine Football Association) Belgrano
	DF	Olivia Gómez	22 September 2006 (age 20)	0	0	(Canadian Soccer Association) Altitude
22	DF	Christine Duarte		2	0	(United States Soccer Federation) C.A. Internacional
13	DF	Ashlin Fuentes		6	0	(United States Soccer Federation) LSU–Shreveport Pilots
6	MF	Alejandra Chirino	23 August 1990 (age 36)	36	0	(United States Soccer Federation) C.A. Internacional
12	MF	Maggi Segovia	15 January 2001 (age 25)	11	0	(Nicaraguan Football Federation) Managua
24	MF	Emely Rubio	12 December 2004 (age 21)	4	0	(United States Soccer Federation) Towson Tigers
16	MF	Makenna Domínguez	19 June 2003 (age 23)	12	1	(Hellenic Football Federation) AEK
16	MF	Mya Ulloa		1	1	(United States Soccer Federation) Simply F.C.
14	MF	Amber Marinero	6 June 1998 (age 28)	10	1	(United States Soccer Federation) FC Premier Women
2	DF	Juana Plata	7 February 2000 (age 26)	27	1	(Mexican Football Federation) Querétaro F.C.
13	FW	Karen Reyes	12 February 1998 (age 28)	13	3	(Hellenic Football Federation) Volos
9	FW	Abigail López	16 March 2001 (age 25)	22	11	(Mexican Football Federation) Puebla
	FW	Dariella Argueta		0	0	(Canadian Soccer Association) Simon Fraser Red Leafs

=== Recent call-ups ===
The following players were called up to the squad in the last 12 months.

Pos.	Player	Date of birth (age)	Caps	Goals	Club	Latest call-up
GK	Samantha Valadez	22 December 2004 (age 21)	4	0	Free Agent	v. Trinidad and Tobago,17 April 2026
GK	Riley Meléndez	22 December 2004 (age 21)	5	0	(Argentina) Ferro Carril Oeste	v. Guatemala, 9 June 2026
GK	Jennifer Alvarado		0	0	(El Salvador) Inter Santa Tecla	v. Guatemala, 9 June 2026
DF	Elaily Hernández	27 May 2000 (age 26)	35	0	(Mexico) Atlético San Luis	v. Trinidad and Tobago,17 April 2026
DF	Yasmine Díaz	29 June 1995 (age 31)	3	0	(United States) FC Stars Blue	v. Trinidad and Tobago, 17 April 2026 ^{PRE}
DF	Priscila Ortiz	7 March 1996 (age 30)	25	0	(El Salvador) Alianza Women	Training camp 16–23 November 2025
DF	Vasthy Delgado	26 May 1994 (age 32)	27	0	Free Agent	v. Guatemala, 9 June 2026
DF	Elyssa Hernández	1 June 2006 (age 20)	2	0	(United States) Seattle Redhawks	v. Guatemala, 9 June 2026
DF	Alyssa Jurado	31 May 2007 (age 19)	0	0	(United States) San Francisco Dons	v. Guatemala, 9 June 2026
MF	Amy Flores	23 December 2006 (age 19)	0	0	(United States) George Mason Patriots	v. Trinidad and Tobago, 17 April 2026 ^{PRE}
MF	Alexis Butz		0	0	(United States) Fresno Pacific Sunbirds	v. Trinidad and Tobago, 17 April 2026 ^{PRE}
MF	Danielle Fuentes	23 August 2000 (age 26)	34	11	(Mexico) Tijuana	v. Guatemala, 9 June 2026
MF	Danya Gutiérrez	12 February 2000 (age 26)	32	12	(Mexico) León	v. Guatemala, 9 June 2026
MF	Samaria Gómez	18 February 2002 (age 24)	21	5	(Turkey) AS Faaliyetler	v. Guatemala, 9 June 2026
MF	Laila Saravia	21 October 2001 (age 25)	12	0	(Mexico) Atlas	v. Guatemala, 9 June 2026
MF	Tatiana Alvarenga		2	0	(United States) UC Merced Golden Bobcats	v. Guatemala, 9 June 2026
MF	Valentina Alvarenga	4 February 2010 (age 16)	0	0	(El Salvador) Inter Santa Tecla	v. Guatemala, 9 June 2026
MF	Angelina Carrillo		0	0	(United States) Legends F.C.	v. Honduras, 2 December 2025^{PRE}
MF	Maya Buerger	20 November 2009 (age 16)	0	0	(United States) Fort Launderdale United	v. Honduras, 2 December 2025^{PRE}
FW	Brenda Cerén (captain)	24 September 1998 (age 28)	45	30	(Mexico) Cruz Azul	v. Guatemala, 9 June 2026
FW	Jackeline Velásquez	18 September 1995 (age 31)	20	5	(Ecuador) Universidad Católica	v. Guatemala, 9 June 2026
FW	Elizabeth Johannes	11 October 2004 (age 22)	8	1	(United States) Grand Canyon Antelopes	v. Guatemala, 9 June 2026

== Competitive record ==
=== FIFA Women's World Cup ===
FIFA Women's World Cup record
Year	Result	Pld	W	D*	L	GF	GA
(China) 1991	Did not enter						
(Sweden) 1995	Did not enter						
(United States) 1999	Did not qualify						
(United States) 2003	Did not qualify						
(China) 2007	Did not qualify						
(Germany) 2011	Did not qualify						
(Canada) 2015	Did not qualify						
(France) 2019	Did not qualify						
(Australia) (New Zealand) 2023	Did not qualify						
(Brazil) 2027	To be determined						
(Mexico) (United States) 2031	Future event						
(United Kingdom) 2035	Future event						
Total	–	–	–	–	–	–	–

*Draws include knockout matches decided on penalty kicks.

=== Olympic Games ===
Summer Olympics record									Qualifying record					
Year	Round	Position	Pld	W	D*	L	GF	GA	Pld	W	D*	L	GF	GA
(United States) 1996	Did not enter								1995 FIFA WWC					
(Australia) 2000	Did not qualify								1999 FIFA WWC					
(Greece) 2004	Did not enter								Did not enter					
(China) 2008	Did not qualify								2	0	0	2	1	5
(United Kingdom) 2012	Did not qualify								4	2	0	2	12	10
(Brazil) 2016	Did not qualify								3	1	0	2	1	5
(Japan) 2020	Did not qualify								2	0	0	2	1	7
(France) 2024	Did not qualify								2022 CONCACAF W Championship					
(United States) 2028	To be determined								2026 CONCACAF W Championship					
Total	–	–	–	–	–	–	–	–	11	3	0	8	15	27

*Draws include knockout matches decided on penalty kicks.

=== CONCACAF W Championship ===
CONCACAF W Championship record								Qualification record					
Year	Result	Pld	W	D*	L	GF	GA	Pld	W	D*	L	GF	GA
(Haiti) 1991	Did not enter							Did not enter					
(United States) 1993	Did not enter							Did not enter					
(Canada) 1994	Did not enter							Did not enter					
(Canada) 1998	Did not qualify							3	0	1	2	3	10
(United States) 2000	Did not enter							Did not enter					
(United States) (Canada) 2002	Did not qualify							4	1	0	3	3	11
(United States) 2006	Did not qualify							2	0	0	2	1	10
(Mexico) 2010	Did not qualify							2	1	0	1	10	2
(United States) 2014	Did not qualify							2	1	0	1	2	4
(United States) 2018	Did not qualify							3	0	1	2	4	19
(Mexico) 2022	Did not qualify							4	3	0	1	15	3
(United States) 2026	Qualified							3	3	0	0	18	0
Total	–	1/11	–	–	–	–	–	23	9	2	12	56	59

*Draws include knockout matches decided on penalty kicks.

=== CONCACAF W Gold Cup ===
CONCACAF W Gold Cup record								Qualification record							
Year	Result	GP	W	D*	L	GF	GA	Division	Group	GP	W	D*	L	GF	GA
(United States) 2024	Group Stage	3	0	0	3	2	11	B	B	7	7	0	0	27	3
(N/A) 2029	To be determined							To be determined							
Total	1/1	3	0	0	3	2	11	–	–	7	7	0	0	27	3

*Draws include knockout matches decided on penalty kicks.

=== Pan American Games ===
Pan American Games record
Year	Result	Pld	W	D*	L	GF	GA
(Canada) 1999	Did not enter						
(Dominican Republic) 2003	Did not enter						
(Brazil) 2007	Did not enter						
(Mexico) 2011	Did not qualify						
(Canada) 2015	Did not qualify						
(Peru) 2019	Did not qualify						
(Chile) 2023	Did not qualify						
Total	–	–	–	–	–	–	–

*Draws include knockout matches decided on penalty kicks.

=== Central American and Caribbean Games ===
Central American and Caribbean Games record
Year	Result	Pld	W	D*	L	GF	GA
(Puerto Rico) 2010	Did not enter						
(Mexico) 2014	Did not enter						
(Colombia) 2018	Did not enter						
(El Salvador) 2023	Bronze medal	5	2	1	2	12	10
(Dominican Republic) 2026	Bronze medal	5	3	0	2	5	7
Total	2 Bronze medal	10	5	1	4	17	17

*Draws include knockout matches decided on penalty kicks.

=== Central American Games ===
Central American Games record
Year	Result	Pld	W	D*	L	GF	GA
(Guatemala) 2001	Fourth place	4	1	0	3	8	11
(Costa Rica) 2013	Group stage	3	1	0	2	11	6
(Nicaragua) 2017	Fourth place	5	0	1	4	4	19
(El Salvador) 2022	Canceled						
(Guatemala) 2025	Runners-up	4	2	0	2	7	2
Total	Runners-up	16	4	1	11	30	38

*Draws include knockout matches decided on penalty kicks.

== Honours ==
=== Regional ===
- Central American and Caribbean Games

Bronze Medalists (2): 2023; 2026

- Central American Games

Silver Medalists (1): 2025
