= Football at the 1986 Central American Games =

Fútbol en los Juegos Centroamericanos

Tournament details
- Host country: Guatemala
- Dates: 4–10 January 1986
- Teams: 4 (from 1 confederation) (from 4 associations)
- Venue: 1 (in 1 host city)

Final positions
- Champions: Guatemala (1st title)
- Runners-up: Honduras
- Third place: Nicaragua

Tournament statistics
- Matches played: 6
- Goals scored: 11 (1.83 per match)

The football tournament at the 1986 Central American Games was held in Guatemala City, Guatemala from 4 to 10 January. El Salvador, Honduras and Nicaragua were invited to enter their U-21 teams to play in the tournament along with hosts Guatemala. The tournament also served as a qualification to the 1986 Central American and Caribbean Games held in Santo Domingo, Dominican Republic.

== Teams ==
| Team | App. | Previous best |
|---|---|---|
| El Salvador | 3rd | Gold medal (1977) |
| Guatemala | 3rd | 4th (1973, 1977) |
| Honduras | 1st | — |
| Nicaragua | 3rd | Silver medal (1973) |

== Venue ==
Guatemala City
Estadio Mateo Flores
Capacity: 29,950
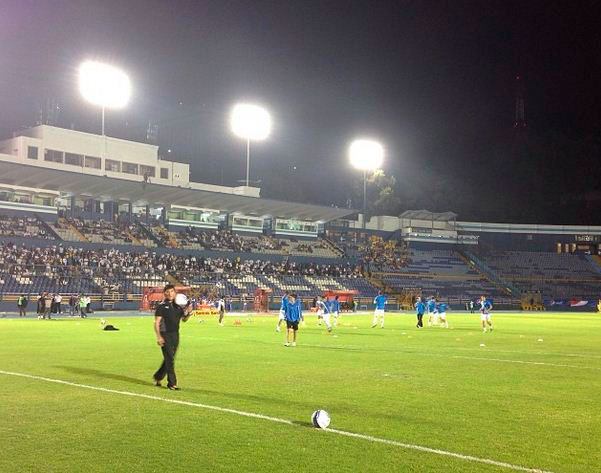

== Final ranking ==
| Pos | Team | Pld | W | D | L | GF | GA | GD | Pts |
|---|---|---|---|---|---|---|---|---|---|
| 1 | Guatemala | 3 | 2 | 1 | 0 | 4 | 1 | +3 | 5 |
| 2 | Honduras | 3 | 2 | 0 | 1 | 6 | 1 | +5 | 4 |
| 3 | Nicaragua | 3 | 0 | 2 | 1 | 1 | 5 | −4 | 2 |
| 4 | El Salvador | 3 | 0 | 1 | 2 | 0 | 4 | −4 | 1 |

== Results ==
| 4 January 1986 Day 1 | El Salvador | 0–2 | Honduras | Guatemala City |
| CST | | | | Stadium: Estadio Mateo Flores |

| 6 January 1986 Day 1 | Guatemala | 1–1 | Nicaragua | Guatemala City |
| CST | | | | Stadium: Estadio Mateo Flores |

| 8 January 1986 Day 2 | El Salvador | 0–0 | Nicaragua | Guatemala City |
| CST | | | | Stadium: Estadio Mateo Flores |

| 8 January 1986 Day 2 | Guatemala | 1–0 | Honduras | Guatemala City |
| CST | | | | Stadium: Estadio Mateo Flores |

| 10 January 1986 Day 3 | Guatemala | 2–0 | El Salvador | Guatemala City |
| CST | | | | Stadium: Estadio Mateo Flores |

| 10 January 1986 Day 3 | Honduras | 4–0 | Nicaragua | Guatemala City |
| CST | | | | Stadium: Estadio Mateo Flores |

== Teams Qualified to the 1986 Central American and Caribbean ==
- Guatemala
- Honduras
- Note: Guatemala who had qualified to the Games but withdrew later at the qualification
