= Football at the 1990 Central American Games =

Fútbol en los Juegos Centroamericanos

Tournament details
- Host country: Honduras
- Dates: 5–14 January 1990
- Teams: 3 (from 1 confederation) (from 3 associations)
- Venue: 1 (in 1 host city)

Final positions
- Champions: Honduras (1st title)
- Runners-up: Costa Rica
- Third place: Nicaragua

Tournament statistics
- Matches played: 6
- Goals scored: 17 (2.83 per match)

The football tournament at the 1990 Central American Games was held in Tegucigalpa, Honduras from 5 to 14 January. Costa Rica and Nicaragua were invited to enter their U-21 teams to play in the tournament along with hosts Honduras.

== Teams ==
| Team | App. | Previous best |
|---|---|---|
| Costa Rica | 2nd | 5th (1973) |
| Honduras | 2nd | Silver medal (1986) |
| Nicaragua | 4th | Silver medal (1973) |

== Venue ==
Tegucigalpa
Estadio Tiburcio Carías Andino
Capacity: 35,000
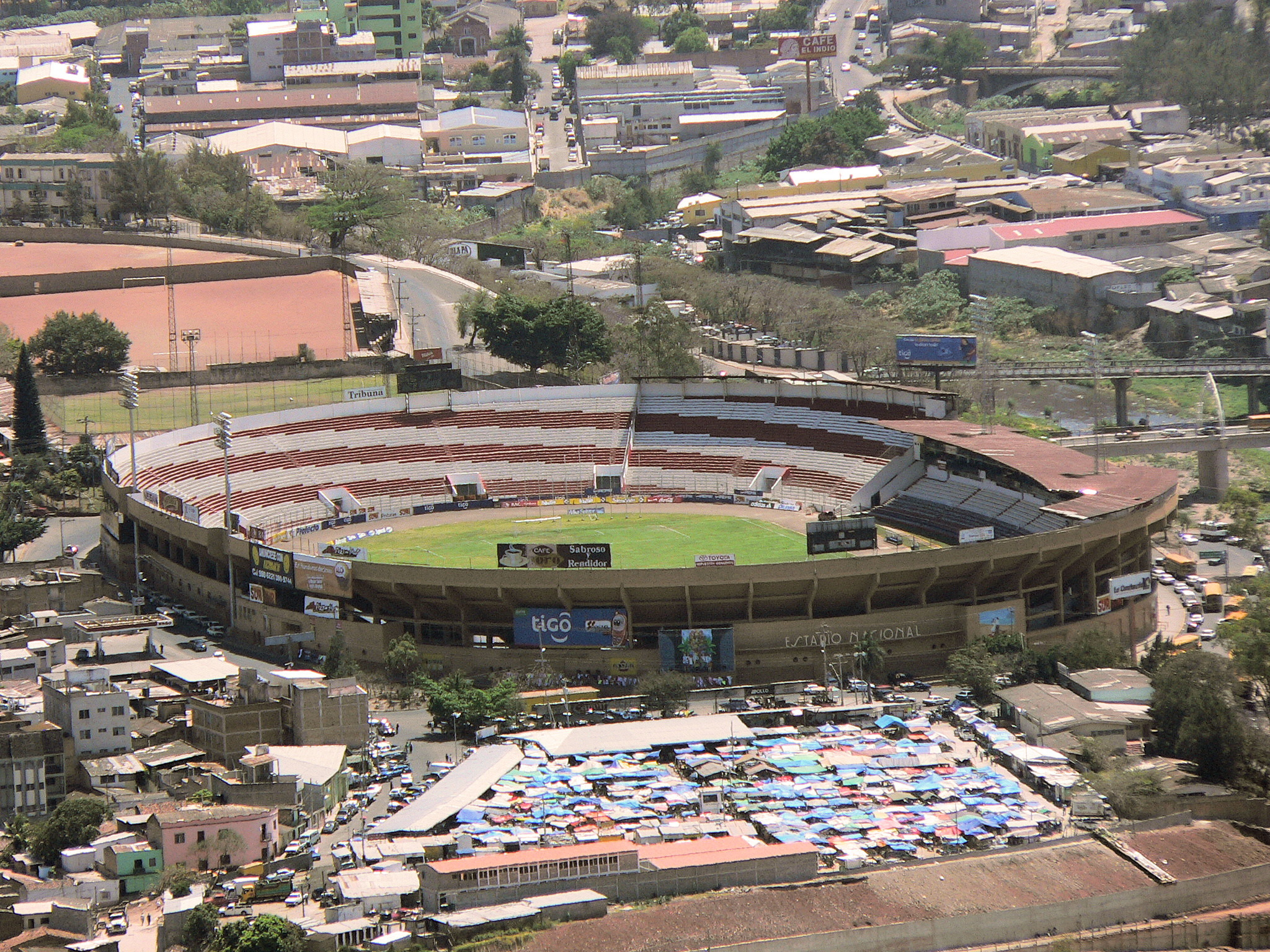

== Final ranking ==
| Pos | Team | Pld | W | D | L | GF | GA | GD | Pts |
|---|---|---|---|---|---|---|---|---|---|
| 1 | Honduras | 4 | 3 | 0 | 1 | 8 | 2 | +6 | 6 |
| 2 | Costa Rica | 4 | 3 | 0 | 1 | 8 | 4 | +4 | 6 |
| 3 | Nicaragua | 4 | 0 | 0 | 4 | 1 | 11 | −10 | 0 |

== Results ==
| January 1990 | Honduras | 3–1 | Costa Rica | Tegucigalpa |
| CST | | | | Stadium: Estadio Tiburcio Carías Andino |

| January 1990 | Honduras | 0–1 | Costa Rica | Tegucigalpa |
| CST | | | | Stadium: Estadio Tiburcio Carías Andino |

| January 1990 | Honduras | 4–0 | Nicaragua | Tegucigalpa |
| CST | | | | Stadium: Estadio Tiburcio Carías Andino |

| January 1990 | Honduras | 1–0 | Nicaragua | Tegucigalpa |
| CST | | | | Stadium: Estadio Tiburcio Carías Andino |

| January 1990 | Costa Rica | 3–0 | Nicaragua | Tegucigalpa |
| CST |

| January 1990 | Costa Rica | 3–1 | Nicaragua | Tegucigalpa |
| CST |
