= El Salvador national under-21 football team =

El Salvador U21
- Nickname: La Azulita
- Association: Federación Salvadoreña de Fútbol
- Confederation: CONCACAF (North America)
- Head coach: Edgar Henríquez
- FIFA code: SLV
First colours	Second colours

The El Salvador national under 21 football team, is the national under-21 football team of El Salvador and is controlled by the Federación Salvadoreña de Fútbol. The team competes in the international under-21 and youth football competitions. They compete for qualification to the Central American and Caribbean Games.

== History ==
=== 2010 FIFA suspension ===
On 11 May 2010, the FIFA Emergency Committee suspended the Salvadoran Football Association (FESFUT) on account of government interference. FIFA made the decision because the statutes ratified by the FESFUT general assembly in August 2009 had not been formally entered in the country's official register, and the government had failed to acknowledge the authority of the Normalisation Committee set up to represent FESFUT.

On 25 May, El Salvador, which had qualified for both of the men's and women's 2010 Central American and Caribbean Games, were disqualified and not included in the draw due to its suspension by FIFA over governmental interference in the affairs of the country's soccer federation.

On 7 June, the CONCACAF lifted the ban, and allowed the male & female U-21 teams to participate once again in the CAC games.

== Players ==
=== Current squad ===
The following 20 players were called up for the 2023 Central American and Caribbean Games. As of June 13, 2023

No.	Pos.	Player	Date of birth (age)	Club
1	GK	Sergio Sibrián	8 July 2004 (aged 18)	(Salvadoran Football Federation) Once Deportivo
2	DF	José Serrano	4 December 2004 (aged 18)	(Salvadoran Football Federation) Municipal Limeño
3	DF	Melvin Cruz	15 January 2001 (aged 22)	(Salvadoran Football Federation) CD Dragón
4	DF	Walter Pineda	4 May 2003 (aged 20)	(Salvadoran Football Federation) CD Águila
5	DF	Edwin Córdova	25 March 2001 (aged 22)	(Salvadoran Football Federation) CD Marte Soyapango
6	DF	Mauricio Cerritos	17 October 2003 (aged 19)	(Salvadoran Football Federation) CD Atlético Marte
7	MF	Javier Bolaños	14 August 2001 (aged 21)	(Salvadoran Football Federation) Once Deportivo
8	MF	Rafael Tejada	12 March 2003 (aged 20)	(Salvadoran Football Federation) CD FAS Reserve
9	FW	Emerson Mauricio	27 August 2002 (aged 20)	(Salvadoran Football Federation) Alianza FC
10	FW	Enrico Hernández	23 February 2001 (aged 22)	(Royal Spanish Football Federation) FC Cartagena B
11	MF	Luis Vásquez	29 October 2002 (aged 20)	(Salvadoran Football Federation) AD Chalatenango
12	DF	Tereso Benítez	15 March 2002 (aged 21)	(Salvadoran Football Federation) Municipal Limeño
13	DF	Diego Flores	1 July 2001 (aged 21)	(Salvadoran Football Federation) CD Luis Ángel Firpo
14	FW	Juan Sánchez	6 October 2001 (aged 21)	(Salvadoran Football Federation) Once Deportivo
15	DF	Jefferson Valladares	8 October 2002 (aged 20)	(Salvadoran Football Federation) Municipal Limeño
16	MF	Elmer Bonilla	10 May 2003 (aged 20)	(Salvadoran Football Federation) CD Dragón
17	FW	Kevin Román	17 April 2002 (aged 21)	(Salvadoran Football Federation) AD Isidro Metapán
18	GK	Adriel Martínez	13 December 2001 (aged 21)	(Royal Spanish Football Federation) CF Motril
19	FW	Styven Vásquez	4 February 2001 (aged 22)	(Salvadoran Football Federation) CD Luis Ángel Firpo
20	DF	Diego Lemus	4 March 2003 (aged 20)	(Salvadoran Football Federation) Santa Tecla FC

== Coaching staff ==
Position	Staff
Head coach	(El Salvador)
Assistant coach	(El Salvador)
Fitness coach	(El Salvador)
Goalkeeping coach	(El Salvador)
Medical trainer	(El Salvador)

=== Coaching history ===
- (El Salvador) Mauricio Rodriguez (1973)
- (El Salvador) Julio Contreras Cardona (1977)
- (El Salvador) Paulo Roberto Cabrera (1986)
- (El Salvador) Juan Ramón Paredes (2002)
- (El Salvador) Mauricio Alfaro (2006-2014)
- (Colombia) Eduardo Lara (2017)
- (El Salvador) Alexsander Rodríguez (2018)
- (El Salvador) Edgar Henríquez (2023)

== See also ==
- El Salvador national football team
- El Salvador national under-17 football team
- El Salvador national under-20 football team
- El Salvador national under-23 football team
- Federación Salvadoreña de Fútbol
