= Football at the 1977 Central American Games =

1977 Central American Games Football Tournament
Tournament details
- Host country: El Salvador
- City: San Salvador
- Dates: 25 November-3 December
- Teams: 4
- Venue: (in 1 host city)

Final positions
- Champions: El Salvador (1st title)
- Runners-up: Panama
- Third place: Nicaragua
- Fourth place: Guatemala

Tournament statistics
- Matches played: 12
- Goals scored: 37 (3.08 per match)

The 1977 Central American Games Football Tournament took place in November and December 1977. The competition was won by El Salvador.

== Teams ==
Team	App.	Previous best
El Salvador	2nd	Bronze medal (1973)
Guatemala	2nd	4th (1973)
Nicaragua	2nd	Silver medal (1973)
Panama	2nd	Gold medal (1973)

== Standings ==
Pos	Team	Pld	W	D	L	GF	GA	GD	Pts	Qualification
1	(gold) El Salvador (Q)	6	4	1	1	17	2	+15	9	Qualified for the 1978 Central American and Caribbean Games
2	(silver) Panama (Q)	6	3	2	1	12	5	+7	8	Qualified for the 1978 Central American and Caribbean Games
3	(bronze) Nicaragua	6	2	0	4	6	23	−17	4	
4	Guatemala	6	1	1	4	2	7	−5	3	

Rules for classification: 1) Points; 2) Goal difference; 3) Number of goals scored;
(Q) Qualified for the phase indicated

== Results ==
25 November 1977

El Salvador	1–1	Panama

San Salvador

25 November 1977

Guatemala	1–2	Nicaragua

San Salvador

27 November 1977

El Salvador	1–0	Guatemala

San Salvador

27 November 1977

Panama	6–3	Nicaragua

San Salvador

28 November 1977

El Salvador	6–0	Nicaragua

San Salvador

28 November 1977

Guatemala	0–0	Panama

San Salvador

30 November 1977

Panama	0–1	El Salvador

San Salvador

30 November 1977

Nicaragua	1–0	Guatemala

San Salvador

1 December 1977

El Salvador	8–0	Nicaragua

San Salvador

1 December 1977

Panama	3–0	Guatemala

San Salvador

3 December 1977

Guatemala	1–0	El Salvador

San Salvador

3 December 1977

Panama	2–0	Nicaragua

San Salvador
