= Football at the 1973 Central American Games =

1973 Central American Games Football Tournament
Tournament details
- Host country: Guatemala
- City: Ciudad de Guatemala
- Dates: 24 November-2 December
- Teams: 5
- Venue(s): (in 1 host city)

Final positions
- Champions: Panama
- Runners-up: Nicaragua
- Third place: El Salvador
- Fourth place: Guatemala

Tournament statistics
- Matches played: 10
- Goals scored: 16 (1.6 per match)
- Top scorer(s): (Nicaragua) Bayardo Barrera (Panama) Jaime Hughes (3 goals)

The football tournament at the 1973 Central American Games was the first to be held. The host city was Ciudad de Guatemala, Guatemala. All games took place between 24 November and 2 December 1973. The competition was age restricted, open to only those under 21 years of age. The top two placed teams earn a ticket to the 1974 Central American and Caribbean Games.

== Teams ==
Teams	App.
Costa Rica	1st
El Salvador	1st
Guatemala	1st
Nicaragua	1st
Panama	1st

== Final standings ==
Pos	Team	Pld	W	D	L	GF	GA	GD	Pts
1	Panama (C)	4	3	1	0	5	0	+5	7
2	Nicaragua	4	2	1	1	4	3	+1	5
3	El Salvador	4	1	2	1	2	4	−2	4
4	Guatemala	4	1	1	2	4	3	+1	3
5	Costa Rica	4	0	1	3	1	6	−5	1

(C) Champions

== Results ==
24 November 1973

El Salvador	1–0	Costa Rica

25 November 1973

Nicaragua	1–0	Guatemala

26 November 1973

Panama	2–0	Costa Rica

26 November 1973

Guatemala	3–0	El Salvador

28 November 1973

Nicaragua	1–1	El Salvador

28 November 1973

Panama	1–0	Guatemala

30 November 1973

Panama	0–0	El Salvador

30 November 1973

Nicaragua	2–0	Costa Rica

2 December 1973

Panama	2–0	Nicaragua

2 December 1973

Guatemala	1–1	Costa Rica

== Teams qualified to the 1974 Central American and Caribbean Games ==
- Panama
- Nicaragua

== Top Scorers ==
Player	Team	Goals
Bayardo Barrera	Nicaragua	3
Jaime Hughes	Panama	3
