= 2016 CONCACAF Women's Olympic Qualifying Championship squads =

The 2016 CONCACAF Women's Olympic Qualifying Championship was an international football tournament that was held in the United States between 10 and 21 February 2016. The 8 national teams involved in the tournament were required to register a squad of 20 players; only players in these squads were eligible to take part in the tournament.

Players marked (c) were named as captain for their national squad. Totals for caps and goals, club affiliations, and ages are as of the opening day of the tournament on 10 February 2016.

== Group A ==
=== Costa Rica ===
Head coach: Amelia Valverde

No.	Pos.	Player	Date of birth (age)	Caps	Club
1	GK	Dinnia Díaz	14 January 1988 (aged 28)		(Costa Rica) Moravia
2	DF	Gaby Guillén	1 March 1992 (aged 23)		(Costa Rica) Saprissa FF
3	MF	Gloriana Villalobos	20 August 1999 (aged 16)		(Costa Rica) Saprissa FF
4	DF	Mariana Benavides	26 December 1994 (aged 21)		(Costa Rica) Moravia
5	DF	Diana Sáenz	15 April 1989 (aged 26)		(United States) South Florida Bulls
6	DF	Carol Sánchez	16 April 1986 (aged 29)		(Costa Rica) Moravia
7	FW	Melissa Herrera	10 October 1996 (aged 19)		(Costa Rica) Moravia
8	DF	Daniela Cruz	8 March 1991 (aged 24)		(Serbia) Red Star Belgrade
9	FW	Carolina Venegas	28 September 1991 (aged 24)		(Spain) Madrid CFF
10	MF	Shirley Cruz	28 August 1985 (aged 30)		(France) Paris Saint-Germain
11	FW	Raquel Rodríguez	28 October 1993 (aged 22)		(United States) Sky Blue FC
12	DF	Lixy Rodríguez	4 November 1990 (aged 25)		(Spain) Santa Teresa
13	GK	Yalitza Sánchez	8 September 1992 (aged 23)		(Costa Rica) UCEM
14	FW	María Fernanda Barrantes	12 April 1989 (aged 26)		(Costa Rica) Moravia
15	MF	Cristín Granados	19 August 1989 (aged 26)		(Costa Rica) Moravia
16	MF	Katherine Alvarado	11 April 1991 (aged 24)		(Costa Rica) Saprissa FF
17	FW	Karla Villalobos	16 July 1986 (aged 29)		(Costa Rica) Moravia
18	GK	Yuliana Salas	7 April 1997 (aged 18)		(Costa Rica) Moravia
19	DF	Fabiola Sánchez	9 April 1993 (aged 22)		(United States) Martin Methodist College
20	MF	Wendy Acosta	19 December 1989 (aged 26)		(Spain) Granadilla

=== Mexico ===
Head coach: Leonardo Cuéllar

No.	Pos.	Player	Date of birth (age)	Caps	Club
1	GK	Cecilia Santiago	19 October 1994 (aged 21)		(Cyprus) Apollon Limassol
2	DF	Arianna Romero	29 July 1992 (aged 23)		(United States) Washington Spirit
3	DF	Janelly Farias	12 February 1990 (aged 25)		Unattached
4	DF	Alina Garciamendez	16 April 1991 (aged 24)		Unattached
5	DF	Valeria Miranda	18 August 1992 (aged 23)		(Mexico) UNAM
6	MF	Karla Nieto	9 January 1995 (aged 21)		(Mexico) Leonas Morelos
7	MF	Nayeli Rangel	28 February 1992 (aged 23)		Unattached
8	MF	Teresa Noyola	15 April 1990 (aged 25)		(United States) Tottenham Hotspur East Bay
9	FW	Maribel Domínguez	18 November 1978 (aged 37)		Unattached
10	FW	Katlyn Johnson	14 September 1994 (aged 21)		(United States) USC Trojans
11	MF	Mónica Ocampo	4 January 1987 (aged 29)		Unattached
12	GK	Bianca Henninger	22 October 1990 (aged 25)		(United States) Houston Dash
13	DF	Greta Espinoza	5 June 1995 (aged 20)		(United States) Oregon State Beavers
14	DF	Annia Mejía	12 March 1996 (aged 19)		(United States) California Golden Bears
15	DF	Mónica Flores	31 January 1996 (aged 20)		(United States) Notre Dame Fighting Irish
16	FW	Desirée Monsiváis	19 January 1988 (aged 28)		(Kazakhstan) BIIK Kazygurt
17	MF	Verónica Pérez	18 May 1988 (aged 27)		(Australia) Canberra United
18	FW	Tanya Samarzich	28 December 1994 (aged 21)		(United States) Kentucky Wildcats
19	FW	Paloma Zermeño	18 June 1995 (aged 20)		(United States) City College of San Francisco
20	GK	Esthefanny Barreras	2 November 1996 (aged 19)		(United States) Eastern Florida State College

=== Puerto Rico ===
The squad was announced on 30 January 2016.

Head coach: Garabet Avedissian

No.	Pos.	Player	Date of birth (age)	Caps	Goals	Club
1	GK	Karly Gustafson	7 April 1995 (aged 20)			(United States Soccer Federation) Winthrop Eagles
2	DF	Kelley Johnson	19 December 1992 (aged 23)			Unattached
3	MF	Victoria Barris	2 February 1998 (aged 18)			(United States Soccer Federation) Quickstrike FC
4	MF	Viviana Fiol	13 July 1989 (aged 26)			Unattached
5	MF	Noelia Reyes	13 March 1991 (aged 24)			(Puerto Rican Football Federation) Bayamón FC
6	FW	Ashley Johnson	4 January 1990 (aged 26)			Unattached
7	DF	Delyaliz Rosario	16 July 1992 (aged 23)			(Puerto Rican Football Federation) Romano SA
8	FW	Selimar Pagán	5 November 1993 (aged 22)			(Puerto Rican Football Federation) Bayamón FC
9	FW	Karina Socarrás	28 November 1993 (aged 22)			(Puerto Rican Football Federation) Bayamón FC
10	MF	Laura Suárez	28 July 1992 (aged 23)			(Puerto Rican Football Federation) Romano SA
11	FW	Annie Méndez	27 July 1994 (aged 21)			(Puerto Rican Football Federation) Bayamón FC
12	MF	Alejandra Carrión	5 November 1996 (aged 19)			(Puerto Rican Football Federation) Gurabo FC
13	GK	Sandra Rolón	17 February 1993 (aged 22)			(Puerto Rican Football Federation) Romano SA
14	DF	Ashley Rivera	18 July 1995 (aged 20)			(Puerto Rican Football Federation) Romano SA
15	MF	Ángela Díaz	28 November 1999 (aged 16)			(Puerto Rican Football Federation) Caribbean Stars
16	DF	Mirianée Zaragoza	15 July 1998 (aged 17)			(Puerto Rican Football Federation) Águilas de Añasco
17	DF	Adriana Font	21 April 1998 (aged 17)			(Puerto Rican Football Federation) Challengers SC
18	MF	Nicole Rodríguez	29 August 1992 (aged 23)			(The Football Association) Durham University
19	MF	Stephanie Colón	27 January 1992 (aged 24)			Unattached
20	GK	María del Carmen Guerrero	17 April 1999 (aged 16)			(Puerto Rican Football Federation) Puerto Rico High Performance

=== United States ===
The final 20-player squad was announced on 26 January 2016.

Head coach: Jill Ellis

No.	Pos.	Player	Date of birth (age)	Caps	Goals	Club
1	GK	Hope Solo	30 July 1981 (aged 34)	186	0	(United States Soccer Federation) Seattle Reign
2	FW	Mallory Pugh	29 April 1998 (aged 17)	1	1	(United States Soccer Federation) Real Colorado
3	MF	Samantha Mewis	9 October 1992 (aged 23)	5	0	(United States Soccer Federation) Western New York Flash
4	DF	Becky Sauerbrunn (c)	6 June 1985 (aged 30)	96	0	(United States Soccer Federation) Kansas City
5	DF	Kelley O'Hara	4 August 1988 (aged 27)	70	1	(United States Soccer Federation) Sky Blue
6	DF	Emily Sonnett	25 November 1993 (aged 22)	5	0	(United States Soccer Federation) Portland Thorns
7	DF	Meghan Klingenberg	2 August 1988 (aged 27)	51	3	(United States Soccer Federation) Portland Thorns
8	DF	Julie Johnston	6 April 1992 (aged 23)	26	5	(United States Soccer Federation) Chicago Red Stars
9	MF	Lindsey Horan	26 May 1994 (aged 21)	7	1	(United States Soccer Federation) Portland Thorns
10	MF	Carli Lloyd (c)	16 July 1982 (aged 33)	212	82	(United States Soccer Federation) Houston Dash
11	DF	Ali Krieger	28 July 1984 (aged 31)	80	1	(United States Soccer Federation) Washington Spirit
12	FW	Christen Press	29 December 1988 (aged 27)	56	29	(United States Soccer Federation) Chicago Red Stars
13	FW	Alex Morgan	2 July 1989 (aged 26)	100	57	(United States Soccer Federation) Orlando Pride
14	MF	Morgan Brian	26 February 1993 (aged 22)	43	4	(United States Soccer Federation) Houston Dash
15	FW	Stephanie McCaffrey	18 February 1993 (aged 22)	5	1	(United States Soccer Federation) Boston Breakers
16	DF	Crystal Dunn	3 July 1992 (aged 23)	21	4	(United States Soccer Federation) Washington Spirit
17	MF	Tobin Heath	29 May 1988 (aged 27)	107	12	(United States Soccer Federation) Portland Thorns
18	GK	Ashlyn Harris	19 October 1985 (aged 30)	8	0	(United States Soccer Federation) Orlando Pride
19	DF	Jaelene Hinkle	28 May 1993 (aged 22)	5	0	(United States Soccer Federation) Western New York Flash
20	GK	Alyssa Naeher	20 April 1988 (aged 27)	3	0	(United States Soccer Federation) Chicago Red Stars

== Group B ==
=== Canada ===
Head coach: John Herdman

No.	Pos.	Player	Date of birth (age)	Caps	Club
1	GK	Erin McLeod	26 February 1983 (aged 32)		Unattached
2	DF	Allysha Chapman	25 January 1989 (aged 27)		(United States) Houston Dash
3	DF	Kadeisha Buchanan	5 November 1995 (aged 20)		(United States) West Virginia Mountaineers
4	DF	Shelina Zadorsky	24 October 1992 (aged 23)		(United States) Washington Spirit
5	MF	Quinn (Note: Then known as Rebecca Quinn)	11 August 1995 (aged 20)		(United States) Duke Blue Devils
6	FW	Deanne Rose	3 March 1999 (aged 16)		(Canada) Scarborough GS United
7	DF	Rhian Wilkinson	12 May 1982 (aged 33)		Unattached
8	MF	Diana Matheson	6 April 1984 (aged 31)		(United States) Washington Spirit
9	DF	Josée Bélanger	14 May 1986 (aged 29)		(United States) Orlando Pride
10	MF	Ashley Lawrence	11 June 1995 (aged 20)		(United States) West Virginia Mountaineers
11	MF	Desiree Scott	31 July 1987 (aged 28)		Unattached
12	FW	Christine Sinclair	12 June 1983 (aged 32)		(United States) Portland Thorns FC
13	MF	Sophie Schmidt	28 June 1988 (aged 27)		(Germany) 1. FFC Frankfurt
14	FW	Melissa Tancredi	27 December 1981 (aged 34)		Unattached
15	FW	Nichelle Prince	19 February 1995 (aged 20)		(United States) Ohio State Buckeyes
16	FW	Gabrielle Carle	12 October 1998 (aged 17)		(Canada) Dynamo de Quebec
17	MF	Jessie Fleming	11 March 1998 (aged 17)		(Canada) London Nor'West SC
18	GK	Stephanie Labbé	10 October 1986 (aged 29)		(United States) Washington Spirit
19	FW	Janine Beckie	20 August 1994 (aged 21)		(United States) Houston Dash
20	GK	Sabrina D'Angelo	11 May 1993 (aged 22)		(United States) Western New York Flash

=== Guatemala ===
Head coach: Benjamín Monterroso

No.	Pos.	Player	Date of birth (age)	Caps	Club
1	GK	Noemy Franco	26 November 1994 (aged 21)		(Guatemala) UNIFUT
2	MF	Daniela Andrade	4 April 1992 (aged 23)		Unattached
3	MF	Marilyn Rivera	19 February 1992 (aged 23)		(Guatemala) UNIFUT
4	DF	Christian Recinos	24 December 1994 (aged 21)		(United States) Grand Canyon Antelopes
5	DF	Londy Barrios	8 April 1992 (aged 23)		(Guatemala) Xelajú
6	DF	Gloria Aguilar	12 March 1990 (aged 25)		(Guatemala) UNIFUT
7	FW	Celeste Gatica	31 October 1996 (aged 19)		(Guatemala) UNIFUT
8	FW	Jennifer Muñoz	31 December 1993 (aged 22)		Unattached
9	FW	Ana Lucía Martínez	8 January 1990 (aged 26)		(Spain) Rayo Vallecano
10	FW	Vivian Herrera	6 May 1996 (aged 19)		(Guatemala) UNIFUT
11	MF	Fabiola González	28 July 1996 (aged 19)		(Guatemala) Xelajú
12	GK	Alicia Navas	26 August 1991 (aged 24)		(Guatemala) Jutiapanecas
13	MF	Alida Argueta	27 January 1996 (aged 20)		(Guatemala) Xelajú
14	DF	Coralia Monterroso	26 December 1991 (aged 24)		(Canada) UNB Reds
15	FW	Waleska Ixcuna	30 July 1991 (aged 24)		(Guatemala) Quiche
16	DF	Yuvitza Mayén	26 July 1999 (aged 16)		(Guatemala) UNIFUT
17	DF	Didra Martínez	25 November 1999 (aged 16)		(Guatemala) Xelajú
18	FW	Diana Barrera	20 January 1987 (aged 29)		(United States) ACF Torino USA
19	MF	Andrea Rabanales	12 June 1998 (aged 17)		(Guatemala) UNIFUT
20	GK	Natalie Schaps	11 February 1999 (aged 16)		(Guatemala) Pares

=== Guyana ===
Head coach: Mark Rodrigues

No.	Pos.	Player	Date of birth (age)	Caps	Club
1	GK	Chanté Sandiford	8 January 1990 (aged 26)		(Iceland) Selfoss
2	MF	Alison Heydorn	5 December 1984 (aged 31)		(United States) Ann Arbor United SC
3	DF	Briana DeSouza	22 May 1991 (aged 24)		(Canada) Durham United FC
4	DF	Kayla DeSouza	7 March 1990 (aged 25)		(Canada) Durham United FC
5	DF	Julia Gonsalves	10 September 1997 (aged 18)		(Canada) Toronto Varsity Blues
6	DF	Leah-Marie Ramalho	14 April 1992 (aged 23)		(Canada) Toronto Rangers SC
7	DF	Justine Rodrigues	17 September 1993 (aged 22)		Unattached
8	MF	Ashlee Savona	12 December 1992 (aged 23)		Unattached
9	MF	Ashley Rodrigues	12 September 1988 (aged 27)		(United States) Tampa Bay Hellenic
10	FW	Calaigh Copland	12 March 1987 (aged 28)		(Canada) Woodbridge Strikers
11	MF	Brittany Persaud	4 January 1990 (aged 26)		Unattached
12	FW	Otesha Charles	14 September 1993 (aged 22)		Unattached
13	DF	Kailey Leila	27 July 1996 (aged 19)		Unattached
14	MF	Dana Bally	4 March 1997 (aged 18)		(Canada) York University
15	MF	Mariam El-Masri	20 June 1991 (aged 24)		(Canada) GS United
16	DF	Kelly Pelz-Butler	11 May 1992 (aged 23)		Unattached
17	MF	Olivia Gonsalves	22 July 1993 (aged 22)		(Canada) University of Toronto
18	GK	Derienne Busby	4 March 1994 (aged 21)		(United States) University of Evansville
19	GK	Ruth George	1 June 1991 (aged 24)		(Guyana) Lil Diva's FC
20	DF	Bria Williams	1 July 1995 (aged 20)		(Canada) Vaughan SC

=== Trinidad and Tobago ===
Head coach: Richard Hood

No.	Pos.	Player	Date of birth (age)	Caps	Club
18	GK	Shalette Alexander	20 December 1993 (aged 22)		(United States) Wiley College
20	GK	Saundra Baron	20 July 1994 (aged 21)		Unattached
1	GK	Kimika Forbes	28 August 1990 (aged 25)		Unattached
4	DF	Danielle Blair	16 June 1988 (aged 27)		(Canada) GS United
2	DF	Jenelle Cunningham	29 April 1990 (aged 25)		(Trinidad and Tobago) Real Dimension
15	DF	Liana Hinds	23 February 1995 (aged 20)		(United States) University of Connecticut
5	DF	Arin King	8 February 1991 (aged 25)		(Canada) GS United
17	DF	Anastasia Prescott	27 June 1987 (aged 28)		Unattached
9	MF	Maylee Attin-Johnson	9 May 1986 (aged 29)		(Trinidad and Tobago) Central FC
19	MF	Kennya Cordner	11 November 1988 (aged 27)		Unattached
6	MF	Khadidra Debesette	6 January 1995 (aged 21)		(United States) West Texas A&M University
14	MF	Karyn Forbes	27 August 1991 (aged 24)		(United States) West Texas A&M University
11	MF	Janine François	1 January 1989 (aged 27)		(Trinidad and Tobago) Real Dimension
13	MF	Naomie Guerra	1 June 1996 (aged 19)		(Trinidad and Tobago) St Augustine Secondary
12	MF	Ahkeela Mollon	2 April 1985 (aged 30)		(Trinidad and Tobago) La brea Amgels
10	MF	Tasha St Louis	20 December 1983 (aged 32)		(Trinidad and Tobago) St Ann's FC
8	MF	Victoria Swift	29 January 1995 (aged 21)		(United States) Navarro College
7	MF	Kayla Taylor	27 October 1994 (aged 21)		(United States) Wiley College
16	FW	Jo Marie Lewis	11 December 1993 (aged 22)		(Trinidad and Tobago) St Ann's FC
3	FW	Mariah Shade	10 December 1991 (aged 24)		(France) US Rouvroy
