= 2014 CONCACAF Women's Championship squads =

This article describes about the squads for the 2014 CONCACAF Women's Championship.

== Group A ==
=== Guatemala ===
The squad was announced on 30 September 2014.

Head coach: Benjamín Monterroso

No.	Pos.	Player	Date of birth (age)	Caps	Club
1	GK	Noemy Franco	27 August 1994 (aged 20)		(Guatemala) Unifut
2	DF	Daniela Andrade	4 April 1992 (aged 22)		(United States) South Florida Bulls
3	MF	Marilyn Rivera	19 February 1992 (aged 22)		(Guatemala) Unifut
4	MF	Mía Espino	6 September 1994 (aged 20)		(United States) UW Parkside Rangers
5	DF	Londy Barrios	8 April 1992 (aged 22)		(Guatemala) Deportivo Amatitlán
6	DF	Gloria Aguilar	12 March 1990 (aged 24)		(Guatemala) Unifut
7	FW	Álida Argueta	27 January 1996 (aged 18)		(Guatemala) Club Xelajú MC
8	FW	María Monterroso	30 November 1993 (aged 20)		(United States) Grand Canyon Antelopes
9	FW	Ana Martínez	8 January 1990 (aged 24)		(United States) BCS Clash
10	FW	Kimberly de León	29 August 1989 (aged 25)		(Guatemala) Deportivo Amatitlán
11	FW	Vilma López	4 September 1989 (aged 25)		(Guatemala) Deportivo Retalhuleu
12	GK	Alicia Navas	24 August 1991 (aged 23)		(Guatemala) Jutiapanecas Rosal
13	FW	Aisha Solórzano	13 April 1998 (aged 16)		(Guatemala) Unifut
14	DF	Coralia Monterroso	26 December 1991 (aged 22)		(Guatemala) Unifut
15	MF	Christian Recinos	24 December 1994 (aged 19)		(United States) Tyler Junior College
16	MF	Cinthya López	23 August 1993 (aged 21)		(Guatemala) Unifut
17	MF	Jeniffer Barrios	10 June 1997 (aged 17)		(Guatemala) Club Xelajú MC
18	DF	Yuvitza Mayén	26 July 1999 (aged 15)		(Guatemala) Pares
19	FW	Diana Barrera	20 January 1987 (aged 27)		(United States) Albany Great Danes
20	FW	Mayuri Cayetano	17 March 1990 (aged 24)		(Guatemala) Izabal JC

=== Haiti ===
The squad was announced on 8 October 2014.

Head coach: Shek Borkowski

No.	Pos.	Player	Date of birth (age)	Caps	Club
1	GK	Géralda Saintilus	10 December 1985 (aged 28)	12	
2	DF	Natacha Cajuste	2 May 1984 (aged 30)	5	
3	FW	Genèvre Charles	22 July 1992 (aged 22)	0	
4	DF	Kencia Marseille	8 November 1980 (aged 33)		
5	MF	Dieunise Jean-Baptiste	10 August 1994 (aged 20)		
6	FW	Kimberly Boulos	16 April 1987 (aged 27)		
7	MF	Manoucheka Pierre-Louis	24 June 1989 (aged 25)		
8	FW	Kensie Bobo	15 October 1992 (aged 22)		
9	MF	Lindsay Zullo	3 May 1991 (aged 23)		
10	MF	Wisline Dolcé	22 November 1986 (aged 27)		
11	MF	Woodlyne Robuste	25 April 1992 (aged 22)		
12	GK	Cynthia Chéry	3 September 1994 (aged 20)		
13	FW	Marie Jean-Pierre	14 January 1990 (aged 24)		
14	FW	Samantha Brand	16 June 1988 (aged 26)		
15	DF	Shanna Hudson	6 August 1985 (aged 29)		
16	MF	Sindy Jeune	13 April 1994 (aged 20)		
17	DF	Yvrase Gerville	20 November 1993 (aged 20)		
18	DF	Roselord Borgella	1 April 1994 (aged 20)		
19	DF	Clorène Rateau	18 January 1993 (aged 21)		
20	DF	Schmid Charles	27 November 1991 (aged 22)		

=== Trinidad and Tobago ===
The squad was announced on 6 October 2014.

No.	Pos.	Player	Date of birth (age)	Caps	Club
1	GK	Kimika Forbes	26 August 1990 (aged 24)		
2	DF	Ayana Russell	16 March 1988 (aged 26)		
3	FW	Mariah Shade	9 December 1991 (aged 22)		
4	DF	Rhea Belgrave	19 July 1991 (aged 23)		
5	MF	Arin King	8 February 1991 (aged 23)		
6	MF	Khadidra Debesette	6 January 1995 (aged 19)		
7	MF	Dernelle Mascall	20 October 1988 (aged 25)		
8	MF	Afiyah Matthias	20 March 1992 (aged 22)		
9	MF	Maylee Atthin-Johnson	9 May 1986 (aged 28)		
10	MF	Tasha St. Louis	27 March 1986 (aged 28)		
11	MF	Janine François	1 January 1989 (aged 25)		
12	FW	Ahkeela Mollon	2 April 1985 (aged 29)		
13	DF	Danielle Blair	16 June 1988 (aged 26)		
14	DF	Karyn Forbes	27 August 1991 (aged 23)		
15	MF	Liana Hinds	23 February 1995 (aged 19)		
16	DF	Brianna Ryce	25 January 1994 (aged 20)		
17	GK	Tenesha Palmer	16 September 1994 (aged 20)		
18	DF	Khadisha Debesette	6 May 1995 (aged 19)		
19	FW	Kennya Cordner	11 November 1988 (aged 25)		(United States) Seattle Sounders Women
20	FW	Lauryn Hutchinson	6 December 1991 (aged 22)		

=== United States ===
The squad was announced on 6 October 2014.

Head coach: Jill Ellis

No.	Pos.	Player	Date of birth (age)	Caps	Goals	Club
1	GK	Hope Solo	30 July 1981 (aged 33)	155	0	(United States Soccer Federation) Seattle Reign FC
2	FW	Sydney Leroux	7 May 1990 (aged 24)	56	32	(United States Soccer Federation) Seattle Reign FC
3	DF	Christie Rampone (c)	24 June 1975 (aged 39)	297	4	(United States Soccer Federation) Sky Blue FC
4	DF	Becky Sauerbrunn	6 June 1985 (aged 29)	64	0	(United States Soccer Federation) FC Kansas City
5	DF	Kelley O'Hara	4 August 1988 (aged 26)	47	0	(United States Soccer Federation) Sky Blue FC
6	DF	Whitney Engen	28 November 1987 (aged 26)	19	2	(United States Soccer Federation) Houston Dash
7	MF	Morgan Brian	26 February 1993 (aged 21)	13	2	(United States Soccer Federation) Virginia
8	FW	Amy Rodriguez	17 February 1987 (aged 27)	111	28	(United States Soccer Federation) FC Kansas City
9	MF	Heather O'Reilly	2 January 1985 (aged 29)	208	41	(United States Soccer Federation) Boston Breakers
10	MF	Carli Lloyd	16 July 1982 (aged 32)	176	51	(United States Soccer Federation) Western New York Flash
11	DF	Ali Krieger	28 July 1984 (aged 30)	49	1	(United States Soccer Federation) Washington Spirit
12	MF	Lauren Holiday	30 September 1987 (aged 27)	105	23	(United States Soccer Federation) FC Kansas City
13	FW	Alex Morgan	2 July 1989 (aged 25)	75	49	(United States Soccer Federation) Portland Thorns FC
14	FW	Christen Press	29 December 1988 (aged 25)	27	13	(United States Soccer Federation) Chicago Red Stars
15	MF	Megan Rapinoe	5 July 1985 (aged 29)	87	27	(United States Soccer Federation) Seattle Reign FC
16	DF	Meghan Klingenberg	2 August 1988 (aged 26)	16	0	(United States Soccer Federation) Houston Dash
17	MF	Tobin Heath	29 May 1988 (aged 26)	77	9	(United States Soccer Federation) Portland Thorns FC
18	GK	Ashlyn Harris	19 October 1985 (aged 28)	3	0	(United States Soccer Federation) Washington Spirit
19	DF	Julie Johnston	6 April 1992 (aged 22)	4	0	(United States Soccer Federation) Chicago Red Stars
20	FW	Abby Wambach	2 June 1980 (aged 34)	224	170	(United States Soccer Federation) Western New York Flash

== Group B ==
=== Costa Rica ===
A 22-player squad was announced on 29 September 2014. The final roster was revealed on 3 October 2014.

Head coach: Carlos Avedissian

No.	Pos.	Player	Date of birth (age)	Caps	Club
1	GK	Dinnia Díaz	14 January 1988 (aged 26)		(Costa Rica) UD Moravia
2	DF	Gabriela Guillén	1 March 1992 (aged 22)		(Costa Rica) Deportivo Saprissa
3	DF	Marianne Ugalde	10 May 1990 (aged 24)		(Costa Rica) Deportivo Saprissa
4	MF	Mariana Benavides	26 December 1994 (aged 19)		(Costa Rica) C.S. Herediano
5	DF	Diana Sáenz	15 April 1989 (aged 25)		(United States) South Florida Bulls
6	DF	Carol Sánchez	16 April 1986 (aged 28)		(Costa Rica) UD Moravia
7	MF	Gloriana Villalobos	20 August 1999 (aged 15)		(Costa Rica) Deportivo Saprissa
8	DF	Daniela Cruz	8 March 1991 (aged 23)		(United States) South Florida Bulls
9	FW	Carolina Venegas	28 September 1991 (aged 23)		(Costa Rica) Deportivo Saprissa
10	MF	Shirley Cruz	28 August 1985 (aged 29)		(France) Paris Saint-Germain
11	FW	Raquel Rodríguez	28 October 1993 (aged 20)		(United States) Penn State
12	MF	Lixy Rodríguez	4 November 1990 (aged 23)		(Costa Rica) L.D. Alajuelense
13	GK	Noelia Bermúdez	20 September 1994 (aged 20)		(Costa Rica) C.S. Herediano
14	DF	Yesmi Rodríguez	12 April 1994 (aged 20)		(Costa Rica) UD Moravia
15	MF	Cristín Granados	19 August 1989 (aged 25)		(Costa Rica) Deportivo Saprissa
16	MF	Katherine Alvarado	11 April 1991 (aged 23)		(Costa Rica) Deportivo Saprissa
17	FW	Daphnne Herrera	10 October 1996 (aged 18)		(Costa Rica) Deportivo Saprissa
18	GK	Yirlania Arroyo	28 May 1986 (aged 28)		(United States) Sky Blue FC
19	DF	Fabiola Sánchez	9 April 1993 (aged 21)		(United States) Martin Methodist College
20	FW	Wendy Acosta	19 December 1989 (aged 24)		(Costa Rica) UD Moravia

=== Jamaica ===
The squad was announced on 5 October 2014.

Head coach: Merron Gordon

No.	Pos.	Player	Date of birth (age)	Caps	Club
1	GK	Taylor Grant	6 May 1994 (aged 20)		(Canada) Vaughan Azzuri
2	MF	Lauren Silver	22 March 1993 (aged 21)		(United States) Florida State
3	DF	Monique Pryce	18 May 1991 (aged 23)		(Jamaica) G.C. Foster College
4	MF	Donna-Kay Henry	10 November 1990 (aged 23)		(United States) BK Knights
5	DF	Mitsy Facey	22 December 1985 (aged 28)		(Jamaica) G.C. Foster College
6	DF	Alicia Wilson	19 December 1979 (aged 34)		(United States) Adenal Coronado
7	FW	Venicia Reid	28 October 1987 (aged 26)		(Jamaica) Fraziers Whip
8	FW	Shanoska Young	26 April 1989 (aged 25)		
9	FW	Shakira Duncan	1 October 1989 (aged 25)		(Jamaica) Harbour View F.C.
10	MF	Omolyn Davis	9 August 1987 (aged 27)		(Kazakhstan) CSHVSM
11	MF	Christina Murray	8 October 1989 (aged 25)		(Jamaica) Waterhouse F.C.
12	DF	Sashana Campbell	2 March 1991 (aged 23)		(Jamaica) Los Perfectos
13	GK	Nicole McClure	16 November 1989 (aged 24)		(Sweden) Östersunds DFF
14	FW	Alexa Allen	27 March 1986 (aged 28)		(United States) North Carolina State
15	FW	Shaneka Gordon	28 May 1986 (aged 28)		(Iceland) ÍBV
16	DF	Yolanda Hamilton	26 May 1987 (aged 27)		(Jamaica) Barbican FC
17	MF	Nicole Campbell-Green	31 January 1991 (aged 23)		(Jamaica) GS United
18	DF	Sherona Forrester	4 November 1991 (aged 22)		(Jamaica) Kingston University
19	FW	Shantel Bailey	30 April 1995 (aged 19)		
20	MF	Jodi-Ann McGregor	5 June 1995 (aged 19)		(Jamaica) Barbican FC

=== Martinique ===
The squad was announced on 8 October 2014.

Head coach: Charlaine Marie Jeanne

No.	Pos.	Player	Date of birth (age)	Caps	Club
1	GK	Benedicte Hubbel			
2	FW	Sarah Melgire			
3	DF	Clara Kichenama	10 May 1999 (aged 15)		
4	DF	Dorialina Dijon	2 September 1998 (aged 16)		
5	MF	Johanne Guillou			
6	FW	Sandra Parfait	1 December 1983 (aged 30)		
7	FW	Kelly Brena			
8	FW	Lena Mauconduit			
9	MF	Nathaela Paulin	19 May 1992 (aged 22)		
10	MF	Audrey Bernabe	27 September 1997 (aged 17)		
11	DF	Sylvia Solbiac			
12	MF	Prisca Carin			
13	DF	Loriane Martial			
14	DF	Catherine Noël			
15	DF	Mandy Jacques	12 July 1987 (aged 27)		(France) Montauban
16	GK	Cathy Bellune			
17	DF	Nathalie Rangoly			
18	FW	Aurelie Rouge	25 May 1992 (aged 22)		(France) Aurillac Arpajon
19	MF	Alexandra Croisetu			
20	DF	Catherine Ravi			

=== Mexico ===
The squad was announced on 13 October 2014.

Head coach: Leonardo Cuéllar

No.	Pos.	Player	Date of birth (age)	Caps	Club
1	GK	Cecilia Santiago	19 October 1994 (aged 19)		
2	DF	Arianna Romero	29 July 1992 (aged 22)		
3	DF	Bianca Sierra	25 June 1992 (aged 22)		
4	DF	Alina Garciamendez	16 April 1991 (aged 23)		
5	DF	Paulina Solís	13 March 1996 (aged 18)		
6	MF	Liliana Mercado	22 October 1988 (aged 25)		
7	MF	Nayeli Rangel	28 February 1992 (aged 22)		
8	MF	Teresa Noyola	15 April 1990 (aged 24)		
9	FW	Charlyn Corral	11 September 1991 (aged 23)		
10	MF	Stephany Mayor	23 September 1991 (aged 23)		
11	FW	Mónica Ocampo	4 January 1987 (aged 27)		
12	GK	Pamela Tajonar	2 December 1984 (aged 29)		
13	DF	Kenti Robles	15 February 1991 (aged 23)		
14	DF	Mónica Alvarado	11 January 1991 (aged 23)		
15	DF	Christina Murillo	28 January 1993 (aged 21)		
16	MF	Karla Nieto	9 January 1995 (aged 19)		
17	MF	Verónica Pérez	18 May 1988 (aged 26)		
18	MF	Dinora Garza	24 January 1988 (aged 26)		
19	FW	Tanya Samarzich	28 December 1994 (aged 19)		
20	FW	Luz Duarte	29 August 1995 (aged 19)		
