= 2012 CONCACAF Women's U-20 Championship qualification =

The qualifying tournaments for the 2012 CONCACAF Under-20 Women's Championship, the North American continent's youth football championships started in August 2011. The qualification process was divided into the Central American and Caribbean zones. Canada, Mexico and the United States automatically qualified for the final tournament.

== Central America qualifying ==
The group winners qualify for the 2012 CONCACAF Under-20 Women's Championship

=== Group 1 ===
Team	Pld	W	D	L	GF	GA	GD	Pts
Guatemala	2	2	0	0	6	2	+4	6
Costa Rica	2	1	0	1	5	3	+2	3
Honduras	2	0	0	2	1	7	−6	0

August 16, 2011

Costa Rica	1–3	Guatemala
Durán 7'	Report	Marroquín 37'; Monterroso 56', 90'

Estadio Carlos Miranda, Comayagua
Attendance: 478
Referee: Maraget Domka (United States)

August 18, 2011

Honduras	0–4	Costa Rica
	Report	Quirós 35'; Rodríguez 46'; Guevara 63'; Gamboa 69'

Estadio Carlos Miranda, Comayagua
Attendance: 876
Referee: Yesli Rivas (El Salvador)

August 20, 2011

Guatemala	3–1	Honduras
Monterroso 27', 72'; Mejía 35'	Report	Hernández 56'

Estadio Carlos Miranda, Comayagua
Attendance: 322
Referee: Alondra Arellano (Mexico)

=== Group 2 ===
Team	Pld	W	D	L	GF	GA	GD	Pts
Panama	2	1	1	0	5	3	+2	4
Nicaragua	2	1	0	1	4	5	−1	3
El Salvador	2	0	1	1	4	5	−1	1

August 24, 2011

Panama	3–1	Nicaragua
Evans 8', 24'; Cox 45'	Report	Aguilar 70'

Estadio Luis Ernesto Cascarita Tapia, Panama City
Attendance: 112
Referee: Irazema Aguilar (Cuba)

August 26, 2011

El Salvador	2–3	Nicaragua
Rivas 10'; Menjívar 18'	Report	Orozco 63'; Aguilar 83'; Solís 90'

Estadio Luis Ernesto Cascarita Tapia, Panama City
Attendance: 42
Referee: Vinicio Villatoro (Guatemala)

August 28, 2011

Panama	2–2	El Salvador
Evans 50'; Cox 55'	Report	González 42'; Portillo 90'

Estadio Luis Ernesto Cascarita Tapia, Panama City
Attendance: 628
Referee: Maraget Domka (United States)

== Caribbean qualifying ==
=== First round ===
The winner and runner-up from each group advance to the second round.

==== Group A ====
Team	Pld	W	D	L	GF	GA	GD	Pts
Jamaica	2	2	0	0	6	0	+6	6
Cuba	2	1	0	1	9	2	+7	3
Saint Lucia	2	0	0	2	0	13	−13	0

21 October 2011	Cuba	9–0	Saint Lucia	Estadio Pedro Marrero, Ciudad de La Habana
07:30	Calderón 9', 12', 37', 44'; Goitizolo 20'; Peláez 26', 65' (pen.); Galán 61'; Cruz 90+2'			Attendance: 125; Referee: Alicia Villatoro Guatemala

23 October 2011	Saint Lucia	0–4	Jamaica	Estadio Pedro Marrero, Ciudad de La Habana
07:30			Cooper 16'; Salmon 18'; Broderick 38'; Sweatman 57'	Attendance: 150; Referee: Ignatius Baptiste Dominica

25 October 2011	Cuba	0–2	Jamaica	Estadio Pedro Marrero, Ciudad de La Habana
07:30			Salmon 26'; Cooper 60'	Attendance: 150; Referee: Alicia Villatoro Guatemala

==== Group B ====
Team	Pld	W	D	L	GF	GA	GD	Pts
Trinidad and Tobago	2	2	0	0	9	0	+9	6
Cayman Islands	2	1	0	1	4	1	+3	3
Suriname	2	0	0	2	0	12	−12	0

18 October 2011	Suriname	0–4	Cayman Islands	Dr. Ir. Franklin Essed Stadion, Paramaribo
09:00			Ebanks 50'; Hydes 52'; McLaughlin 64'; Monteith 80'	Attendance: 246; Referee: Gillian Martindale Barbados

20 October 2011	Cayman Islands	0–1	Trinidad and Tobago	Dr. Ir. Franklin Essed Stadion, Paramaribo
09:00			Pierre 90+3'	Attendance: 50; Referee: Cardella Samuels Jamaica

22 October 2011	Suriname	0–8	Trinidad and Tobago	Dr. Ir. Franklin Essed Stadion, Paramaribo
08:00			Campbell 5'; Ryce 12', 64'; Walker 17'; Debesette 41'; Matthias 43'; McGee 64', 86'	Attendance: 450; Referee: Gillian Martindale Barbados

==== Group C ====
Team	Pld	W	D	L	GF	GA	GD	Pts
Haiti	2	2	0	0	8	0	+8	6
Puerto Rico	2	1	0	1	4	4	0	3
Saint Kitts and Nevis	2	0	0	2	0	8	−8	0

31 October 2011	Haiti	4–0	Puerto Rico	Stade Sylvio Cator, Port-au-Prince
08:30	Merone 34'; Gytane 65', 90+3'; Gerville 66'			Attendance: 2000; Referee: Sabina Charles-Kirton Saint Lucia

2 November 2011	Saint Kitts and Nevis	0–4	Puerto Rico	Stade Sylvio Cator, Port-au-Prince
08:30			González 31'; Suárez 49'; Colón 60'; Rodríguez 80'	Attendance: 200; Referee: Annia Navarrete Cuba

4 November 2011	Haiti	4–0	Saint Kitts and Nevis	Stade Sylvio Cator, Port-au-Prince
08:30	Jean 9'; Rateau 17'; Merone 58'; Jeune 62'			Attendance: 300; Referee: Annia Navarrete Cuba

==== Group D ====
Team	Pld	W	D	L	GF	GA	GD	Pts
Guyana	3	3	0	0	14	1	+13	9
Dominican Republic	3	2	0	1	15	3	+12	6
Anguilla	3	1	0	2	1	10	−9	3
Antigua and Barbuda	3	0	0	3	1	17	−16	0

2 November 2011	Anguilla	0–5	Dominican Republic	Providence Stadium, Providence
05:30			Núñez 28', 46', 54'; Claudio 60', 88'	Attendance: 350; Referee: Gillian Martindale Barbados

2 November 2011	Guyana	7–0	Antigua and Barbuda	Providence Stadium, Providence
07:30	Prasad 1'; Edwards 4'; Charles 11', 30', 42', 58'; Savona 45'			Attendance: 400; Referee: Cardella Samuels Jamaica

4 November 2011	Dominican Republic	9–1	Antigua and Barbuda	Providence Stadium, Providence
05:30	Núñez 15', 17', 48', 56', 60', 90'; Claudio 35', 80'; Michel 87'		Jacobs 63'	Attendance: 300; Referee: Alondra Arellano Mexico

4 November 2011	Guyana	5–0	Anguilla	Providence Stadium, Providence
07:30	Savona 4', 73', 88'; Leila 36', 75'			Attendance: 350; Referee: Deborah Zebeda Suriname

6 November 2011	Antigua and Barbuda	0–1	Anguilla	Providence Stadium, Providence
05:30			White 69'	Attendance: 200; Referee: Gillian Martindale Barbados

6 November 2011	Guyana	2–1	Dominican Republic	Providence Stadium, Providence
07:30	Prasad 71'; Rodrigues 90+2'		Núñez 62'	Attendance: 900; Referee: Cardella Samuels Jamaica

=== Second round ===
The group winners and the best runner-up qualified for the 2012 CONCACAF Under-20 Women's Championship.

==== Group A ====
Team	Pld	W	D	L	GF	GA	GD	Pts
Haiti	3	3	0	0	8	0	+8	9
Jamaica	3	2	0	1	6	1	+5	6
Cayman Islands	3	0	1	2	0	5	−5	1
Dominican Republic	3	0	1	2	0	8	−8	1

6 January 2012	Jamaica	0–1	Haiti	Estadio Panamericano, San Cristóbal
06:00			Borgella 39'	Attendance: 200; Referee: Annia Navarette (Cuba)

6 January 2012	Dominican Republic	0–0	Cayman Islands	Estadio Panamericano, San Cristóbal
08:00				Attendance: 200; Referee: Gillian Martindale (Barbados)

8 January 2012	Cayman Islands	0–2	Jamaica	Estadio Panamericano, San Cristóbal
06:00			Spence 30'; Williams 76'	Attendance: 200; Referee: Deborah Zebeda (Suriname)

8 January 2012	Dominican Republic	0–4	Haiti	Estadio Panamericano, San Cristóbal
08:00			Merone 2', 9'; Rateau 59'; Gytame 85'	Attendance: 400; Referee: Yesli Rivas (El Salvador)

10 January 2012	Haiti	3–0	Cayman Islands	Estadio Panamericano, San Cristóbal
06:00	Merone 1'; Robuste 40'; Jeune 65'			Attendance: 300; Referee: Yesli Rivas (El Salvador)

10 January 2012	Dominican Republic	0–4	Jamaica	Estadio Panamericano, San Cristóbal
08:00			Carter 1'; Sweatman 49'; Spence 66'; Williams 90'	Attendance: 400; Referee: Gillian Martindale (Barbados)

==== Group B ====
Team	Pld	W	D	L	GF	GA	GD	Pts
Cuba	3	1	2	0	7	3	+4	5
Trinidad and Tobago	3	1	1	1	3	3	0	4
Puerto Rico	3	1	1	1	2	2	0	4
Guyana	3	1	0	2	3	7	−4	3

7 January 2012	Puerto Rico	1–0	Trinidad and Tobago	Estadio Pedro Marrero, Ciudad de La Habana
03:00	Colón 80'			Attendance: 100; Referee: Sabina Charles-Kirton Saint Lucia

7 January 2012	Cuba	5–1	Guyana	Estadio Pedro Marrero, Ciudad de La Habana
08:00	Galán 45'; Pérez 56'; Peláez 60', 90'; Goitizolo 83'		Savona 35'	Attendance: 300; Referee: Alondra Arellano Mexico

9 January 2012	Trinidad and Tobago	2–1	Guyana	Estadio Pedro Marrero, Ciudad de La Habana
03:00	Debesette 56', 85'		Savona 20'	Attendance: 120; Referee: Carline Reid Cayman Islands

9 January 2012	Cuba	1–1	Puerto Rico	Estadio Pedro Marrero, Ciudad de La Habana
08:00	Peláez 44'		Suárez 47'	Attendance: 150; Referee: Justina De la Cruz Dominican Republic

11 January 2012	Guyana	1–0	Puerto Rico	Estadio Pedro Marrero, Ciudad de La Habana
03:00	Savona 27'			Attendance: 50; Referee: Sabina Charles-Kirton Saint Lucia

11 January 2012	Cuba	1–1	Trinidad and Tobago	Estadio Pedro Marrero, Ciudad de La Habana
08:00	Peláez 48'		McGee 20'	Attendance: 300; Referee: Alondra Arellano Mexico
