= 2016 CONCACAF Women's Olympic Qualifying Championship qualification =

The 2016 CONCACAF Women's Olympic Qualifying Championship qualification was a women's football competition which decided the participating teams of the 2016 CONCACAF Women's Olympic Qualifying Championship.

A total of eight teams qualified to play in the final tournament, where the berths were allocated to the three regional zones as follows:

- Three teams from the North American Zone (NAFU), i.e., Canada, Mexico and the hosts United States, who all qualified automatically
- Two teams from the Central American Zone (UNCAF)
- Three teams from the Caribbean Zone (CFU)

The top two teams of the final tournament qualified for the 2016 Summer Olympics women's football tournament in Brazil.

== Teams ==
A total of 23 CONCACAF member national teams entered the tournament. Among them, three teams qualified automatically for the final tournament, and 20 teams entered the regional qualifying competitions.

Zone	Teams entering	No. of teams
North American Zone (NAFU)	Canada (qualified automatically for final tournament); Mexico (qualified automatically for final tournament); United States (qualified automatically for final tournament)	3
Central American Zone (UNCAF)	Costa Rica; El Salvador; Guatemala; Honduras; Nicaragua	5
Caribbean Zone (CFU)	Antigua and Barbuda; Aruba; Cayman Islands; Cuba; Dominica; Dominican Republic; Grenada; Guyana; Haiti; Jamaica; Puerto Rico; Saint Kitts and Nevis; Saint Lucia; Suriname; Trinidad and Tobago	15

Did not enter
North American Zone (NAFU)	None
Central American Zone (UNCAF)	Belize; Panama
Caribbean Zone (CFU)	Anguilla^{1}; Bahamas; Barbados; Bermuda; Bonaire^{1}; British Virgin Islands; Curaçao^{1}; French Guiana^{1}; Guadeloupe^{1}; Martinique^{1}; Montserrat^{1}; Saint Martin^{1}; Saint Vincent and the Grenadines; Sint Maarten^{1}; Turks and Caicos Islands^{1}; U.S. Virgin Islands

Notes
^{1} Non-IOC member, ineligible for Olympics.

== Central American Zone ==
2016 CONCACAF Women's Olympic Qualifying Championship qualification (Central American Zone)
Eliminatoria Preolimpica Femenina de UNCAF 2015

Tournament details
- Host country: Nicaragua
- Dates: 30 September – 4 October 2015
- Teams: 5 (from 1 sub-confederation)

Final positions
- Champions: Costa Rica
- Runners-up: Guatemala
- Third place: El Salvador
- Fourth place: Nicaragua

Tournament statistics
- Matches played: 6
- Goals scored: 17 (2.83 per match)
- Top scorer(s): (Costa Rica) Melissa Herrera (Costa Rica) Karla Villalobos (3 goals each)

In the Central American Zone, five UNCAF member national teams entered the qualifying competition. They were placed in a single group, as confirmed on 28 February 2015 at the UNCAF Executive Committee meeting in Managua, Nicaragua. The matches were played between 30 September and 4 October 2015 in Nicaragua (originally between 26 September and 4 October 2015 before Honduras withdrew). The top two teams qualified for the final tournament as the UNCAF representatives.

Times UTC−6.

=== Group ===
Pos	Team	Pld	W	D	L	GF	GA	GD	Pts	Qualification
1	Costa Rica	3	3	0	0	10	1	+9	9	2016 CONCACAF Women's Olympic Qualifying Championship
2	Guatemala	3	2	0	1	5	3	+2	6	2016 CONCACAF Women's Olympic Qualifying Championship
3	El Salvador	3	1	0	2	1	5	−4	3	
4	Nicaragua (H)	3	0	0	3	1	8	−7	0	
5	Honduras	0	0	0	0	0	0	0	0	Withdrew

Source: UNCAF
(H) Hosts
30 September 2015
17:00

Guatemala	1–2	Costa Rica
Monterroso 26'	Report	Herrera 6'; Venegas 79'

Nicaragua National Football Stadium, Managua
Referee: Miriam León (El Salvador)
30 September 2015
20:00

Nicaragua	0–1	El Salvador
	Report	González 49'

Nicaragua National Football Stadium, Managua

2 October 2015
17:00

Costa Rica	3–0	El Salvador
Herrera 53'; Villalobos 61'; Alvarado 85'	Report

Nicaragua National Football Stadium, Managua
2 October 2015
20:00

Nicaragua	1–2	Guatemala
Cate 33'	Report	Herrera 38'; Rivera 90'

Nicaragua National Football Stadium, Managua

4 October 2015
17:00

El Salvador	0–2	Guatemala
	Report	Monterroso 25'; Rivera 38'

Nicaragua National Football Stadium, Managua
4 October 2015
20:00

Nicaragua	0–5	Costa Rica
	Report	Alvarado 16'; Villalobos 30', 72'; Herrera 73'; Venegas 80'

Nicaragua National Football Stadium, Managua

=== Goalscorers ===
3 goals

- (Costa Rica) Melissa Herrera
- (Costa Rica) Karla Villalobos

2 goals

- (Costa Rica) Katherine Alvarado
- (Costa Rica) Carolina Venegas
- (Guatemala) Coralia Monterroso
- (Guatemala) Marilyn Rivera

1 goal

- (El Salvador) Francisca González
- (Guatemala) Vivian Herrera
- (Nicaragua) Ana Cate

== Caribbean Zone ==
2016 CONCACAF Women's Olympic Qualifying Championship qualification (Caribbean Zone)
2015 CFU Women's Olympic Qualifier

Tournament details
- Host countries: Puerto Rico (Group 1); Trinidad and Tobago (Group 2 and final round); Dominican Republic (Groups 3 and 4)
- Dates: 21 August – 20 November 2015
- Teams: 15 (from 1 sub-confederation)

Final positions
- Champions: Trinidad and Tobago
- Runners-up: Puerto Rico
- Third place: Guyana
- Fourth place: Jamaica

Tournament statistics
- Matches played: 18
- Goals scored: 124 (6.89 per match)
- Top scorer: (Haiti) Nérilia Mondésir (12 goals)

In the Caribbean Zone, 15 CFU member national teams entered the qualifying competition. All 15 teams entered the first round, where they were divided into three groups of four teams and one group of three teams. The groups were played between 21 and 25 August and 13–15 October 2015 and hosted by one of the teams in each group. The four group winners advanced to the final round.

In the final round, played between 18 and 20 October 2015 and hosted by one of the teams in the final round, the four teams played a single-elimination tournament. The top three teams qualified for the final tournament as the CFU representatives.

Times UTC−4.

=== First round ===
==== Group 1 ====
Matches played in Puerto Rico.

Pos	Team	Pld	W	D	L	GF	GA	GD	Pts	Qualification
1	Puerto Rico (H)	3	3	0	0	24	2	+22	9	Final round
2	Haiti	3	2	0	1	29	3	+26	6	
3	Grenada	3	1	0	2	2	25	−23	3	
4	Aruba	3	0	0	3	0	25	−25	0	

Source: CFU
(H) Hosts
21 August 2015
17:00

Aruba	0–14	Haiti
	Report	Louis 32', 45', 80', 89', 90'; Jeudy 40', 41', 53'; Mondésir 48', 58', 65', 75' (pen.), 76', 90+1'

Juan Ramón Loubriel Stadium, Bayamón
21 August 2015
20:00

Puerto Rico	12–0	Grenada
Socarrás 10', 13', 65', 87', 89', 90+1'; Méndez 23'; Martínez 62', 72', 76'; Pagán 64'; Rodríguez 69'	Report

Juan Ramón Loubriel Stadium, Bayamón

23 August 2015
16:00

Haiti	13–0	Grenada
Louis 3', 64', 90+4'; Robuste 10'; Beaubrun 23'; Mondésir 26', 29', 36', 39', 79'; Borgella 60', 73'; Gerville 90+2'	Report

Juan Ramón Loubriel Stadium, Bayamón
23 August 2015
18:30

Puerto Rico	9–0	Aruba
Lacle 11' (o.g.); Pagán 24'; Socarrás 25', 29', 48', 89'; Martínez 35'; Rivera 64'; Méndez 90+4'	Report

Juan Ramón Loubriel Stadium, Bayamón

25 August 2015
17:00

Grenada	2–0	Aruba
Frank ?'; John ?'

Juan Ramón Loubriel Stadium, Bayamón
25 August 2015
20:00

Puerto Rico	3–2	Haiti
Méndez 47'; Rivera 62'; Pagán 81'		Rodríguez 60' (o.g.); Mondésir 90+2'

Juan Ramón Loubriel Stadium, Bayamón

==== Group 2 ====
Matches played in Trinidad and Tobago (changed from original hosts Saint Lucia, scheduled for 21–25 August at Mindoo Phillip Park, Castries, but postponed due to Tropical Storm Erika). After two of the four teams withdrew, the format was changed to a two-legged tie between the two remaining teams in the lead-up to the final round.

Pos	Team	Pld	W	D	L	GF	GA	GD	Pts	Qualification
1	Trinidad and Tobago (H)	2	2	0	0	14	1	+13	6	Final round
2	Saint Lucia	2	0	0	2	1	14	−13	0	
3	Antigua and Barbuda	0	0	0	0	0	0	0	0	Withdrew
3	Cayman Islands	0	0	0	0	0	0	0	0	Withdrew

Source: CFU
(H) Hosts
13 November 2015
18:00

Trinidad and Tobago	6–0	Saint Lucia
Mollon 3', 66'; St. Louis 10', 33', 38', 58'

Ato Boldon Stadium, Couva

15 November 2015
18:00

Saint Lucia	1–8	Trinidad and Tobago
Marquis 58' (pen.)	Report	Mollon 12', 32', 81', 83'; Hutchinson 23', 26'; Guerra 65'; Cummings 87'

Ato Boldon Stadium, Couva

==== Group 3 ====
Matches played in Dominican Republic (changed from original hosts Suriname).

Pos	Team	Pld	W	D	L	GF	GA	GD	Pts	Qualification
1	Jamaica	2	2	0	0	18	0	+18	6	Final round
2	Dominican Republic (H)	2	1	0	1	11	6	+5	3	
3	Dominica	2	0	0	2	0	23	−23	0	
4	Suriname	0	0	0	0	0	0	0	0	Withdrew

Source: CFU
(H) Hosts
21 August 2015
16:30

Dominican Republic	11–0	Dominica
Núñez 7', 74'; Xavier 18' (o.g.); Peralta 28', 57'; Ubri 32', 40', 53', 53'; Pérez 65', 73'	Report

Estadio Panamericano, San Cristóbal

23 August 2015
16:30

Dominican Republic	0–6	Jamaica
	Report	Shaw 22', 64'; Reid 32', 69'; Vincent 78'; Foster 80'

Estadio Panamericano, San Cristóbal

25 August 2015
16:30

Dominica	0–12	Jamaica
	Report	Reid 12', 39', 45'; Exeter 14'; Shaw 15'; Hernandez 20'; Henry 35'; Asher 41'; Lockhard 59' (o.g.); Vincent 76', 85'; Pryce 80'

Estadio Panamericano, San Cristóbal

==== Group 4 ====
Matches played in Dominican Republic (changed from original hosts Saint Kitts and Nevis).

Pos	Team	Pld	W	D	L	GF	GA	GD	Pts	Qualification
1	Guyana	2	1	1	0	9	1	+8	4	Final round
2	Cuba	2	1	1	0	7	1	+6	4	
3	Saint Kitts and Nevis	2	0	0	2	0	14	−14	0	

Source: CFU
21 August 2015
14:00

Saint Kitts and Nevis	0–8	Guyana
	Report	Charles 23', 25', 46'; El-Masri 51'; De Souza 65'; Copland 77'; Heydorn 85' (pen.); Gonsalves 87'

Estadio Panamericano, San Cristóbal

23 August 2015
14:00

Guyana	1–1	Cuba
Rodrigues 19'	Report	Pérez 78'

Estadio Panamericano, San Cristóbal

25 August 2015
14:00

Saint Kitts and Nevis	0–6	Cuba
		? ?' ? ?' ? ?' ? ?' ? ?' ? ?'

Estadio Panamericano, San Cristóbal

=== Final round ===
Matches played in Trinidad and Tobago (originally scheduled for 2–4 October 2015, but delayed due to the postponement of first round Group 2).

Semi-finals
18 November – Couva
Puerto Rico (a.e.t.)	1
Guyana	0
18 November – Couva
Trinidad and Tobago (a.e.t.)	2
Jamaica	1

Final
20 November – Couva
Puerto Rico	0
Trinidad and Tobago	1
Third place play-off
20 November – Couva
Guyana	2
Jamaica	1

==== Semi-finals ====
Winners qualified for 2016 CONCACAF Women's Olympic Qualifying Championship.

18 November 2015
17:00

Puerto Rico	1–0 (a.e.t.)	Guyana
Socarrás 119'	Report

Ato Boldon Stadium, Couva
18 November 2015
19:30

Trinidad and Tobago	2–1 (a.e.t.)	Jamaica
Mascall 59'; St. Louis 91'	Report	McGregor 45' (pen.)

Ato Boldon Stadium, Couva

==== Third place playoff ====
Winner qualified for 2016 CONCACAF Women's Olympic Qualifying Championship.

20 November 2015
17:00

Guyana	2–1	Jamaica
El-Masri 48'; Persaud 73'	Report	Vincent 44'

Ato Boldon Stadium, Couva

==== Final ====
20 November 2015
19:30

Puerto Rico	0–1	Trinidad and Tobago
	Report	Forbes 24'

Ato Boldon Stadium, Couva

=== Goalscorers ===
12 goals

- (Haiti) Nérilia Mondésir

11 goals

- (Puerto Rico) Karina Socarrás

8 goals

- (Haiti) Batcheba Louis

6 goals

- (Trinidad and Tobago) Ahkeela Mollon

5 goals

- (Jamaica) Venicia Reid
- (Puerto Rico) Marjorie Martínez
- (Trinidad and Tobago) Tasha St. Louis

4 goals

- (Dominican Republic) Betzaida Ubri
- (Jamaica) Tashana Vincent

3 goals

- (Guyana) Otesha Charles
- (Haiti) Sherly Jeudy
- (Jamaica) Khadija Shaw
- (Puerto Rico) Annie Méndez
- (Puerto Rico) Selimar Pagán

2 goals

- (Dominican Republic) Yaqueisi Núñez
- (Dominican Republic) Winibian Peralta
- (Dominican Republic) Paloma Pérez
- (Guyana) Mariam El-Masri
- (Haiti) Roselord Borgella
- (Puerto Rico) Ashley Rivera
- (Trinidad and Tobago) Lauryn Hutchinson

1 goal

- (Cuba) Maria Pérez
- (Grenada) Roneisha Frank
- (Grenada) Grace John
- (Guyana) Calaigh Copland
- (Guyana) Kayla De Souza
- (Guyana) Olivia Gonsalves
- (Guyana) Alison Heydorn
- (Guyana) Brittany Persaud
- (Guyana) Ashley Rodrigues
- (Haiti) Soveline Beaubrun
- (Haiti) Yvrase Gerville
- (Haiti) Woodlyne Robuste
- (Jamaica) Chinyelu Asher
- (Jamaica) Christine Exeter
- (Jamaica) Shanise Foster
- (Jamaica) Donna-Kay Henry
- (Jamaica) Kai-Lin Hernandez
- (Jamaica) Jodi-Ann McGregor
- (Jamaica) Monique Pryce
- (Saint Lucia) Ellaisa Marquis
- (Puerto Rico) Nicole Rodríguez
- (Trinidad and Tobago) Sharain Cummings
- (Trinidad and Tobago) Karyn Forbes
- (Trinidad and Tobago) Naomie Guerra
- (Trinidad and Tobago) Dernelle Mascall

Own goal

- (Aruba) Jenneling Lacle (playing against Puerto Rico)
- (Dominica) Tabique Lockhard (playing against Jamaica)
- (Dominica) Donisha Xavier (playing against Dominincan Republic)
- (Puerto Rico) Nicole Rodríguez (playing against Haiti)

Note: Six goals scored by Cuba and one goal scored by Jamaica missing goalscorer information.

== Qualified teams ==
The following eight teams qualified for the final tournament.

Team	Qualified as	Qualified on	Previous appearances in tournament^{1}
Canada	Automatic qualifier	N/A	3 (2004, 2008, 2012)
Mexico	Automatic qualifier	N/A	3 (2004, 2008, 2012)
United States	Automatic qualifier / Hosts	N/A	3 (**2004**, **2008**, **2012**)
Costa Rica	Central American Zone 1st place	2 October 2015	3 (2004, 2008, 2012)
Guatemala	Central American Zone 2nd place	4 October 2015	1 (2012)
Trinidad and Tobago	Caribbean Zone 1st place	18 November 2015	2 (2004, 2008)
Puerto Rico	Caribbean Zone 2nd place	18 November 2015	0
Guyana	Caribbean Zone 3rd place	20 November 2015	0

^{1} Bold indicates champion for that year. Italic indicates host for that year.
