= Shanise Foster =

Jamaican footballer (born 1993)

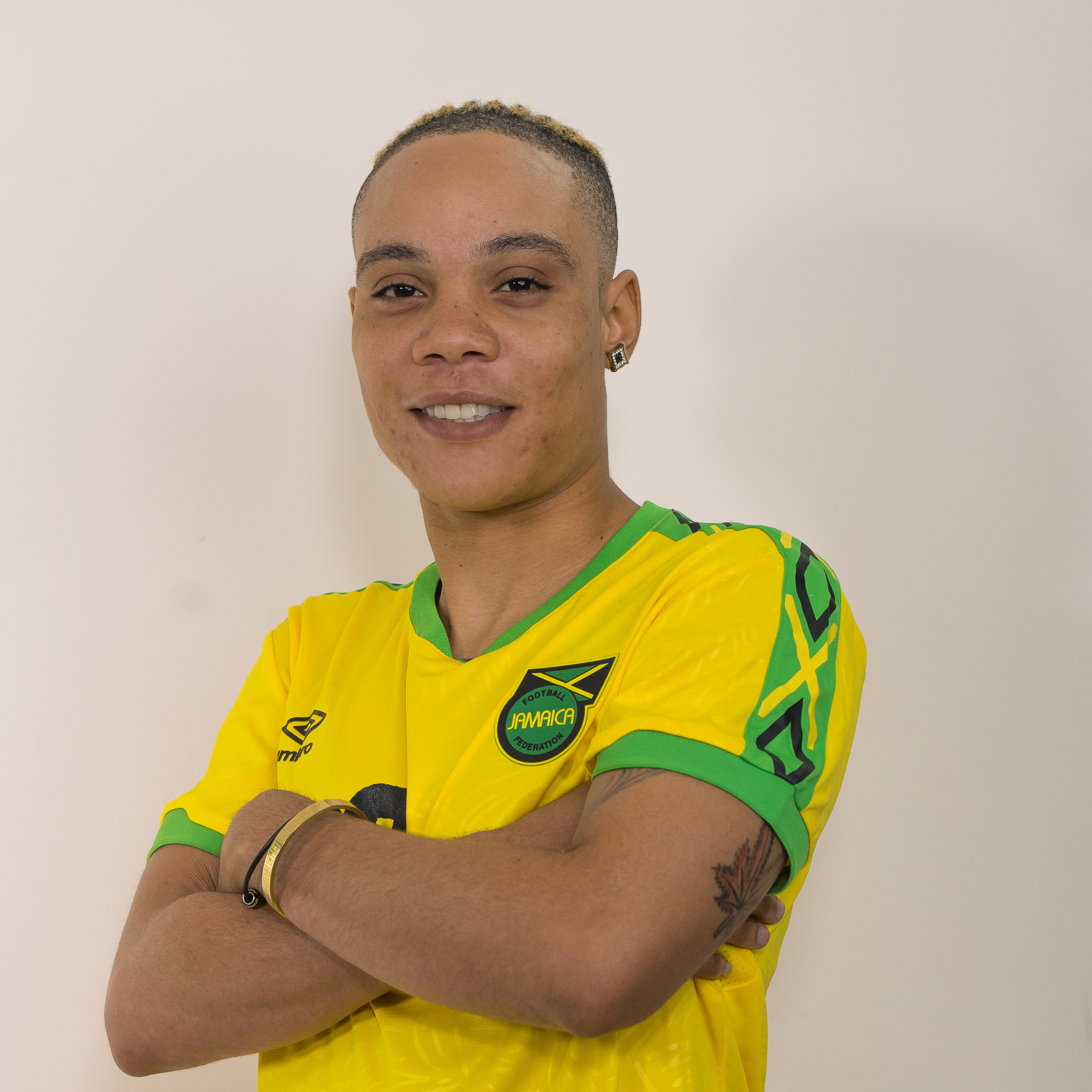

Personal information
- Date of birth: 3 September 1993 (age 33)
- Positions: Midfielder; defender

Team information
- Current team: TP Mazembe
- Number: 12

College career
| Years | Team | Apps | (Gls) |
| 2014 | Navarro College | | |

Senior career*
| Years | Team | Apps | (Gls) |
| 2008 | Norman Mantley | | |
| 2010 | Meadhaven | | |
- Arnett Gardens FC
| 2025– | TP Mazembe | | |

International career^{‡}
| 2007–2010 | Jamaica U-17 | 9 | (1) |
| 2009–2010 | Jamaica U-20 | 7 | (0) |
| 2015– | Jamaica | 2+ | (1) |
Medal record
Representing Jamaica
CONCACAF W Championship
| Third place | 2018 United States |
- * Club domestic league appearances and goals ‡ National team caps and goals as of October 17, 2018

Shanise Foster (born 3 September 1993) is a Jamaican footballer who plays as a midfielder for LINAFF club TP Mazembe and the Jamaica women's national team.

== College career ==
Foster attended Navarro College in the United States. She was supposed to join South Florida Bulls for the 2015 season, but ultimately did not happen.

== International career ==
Foster represented Jamaica at two CONCACAF Women's U-17 Championship editions (2008 and 2010) and the 2010 CONCACAF Women's U-20 Championship. She made her senior debut during the 2016 CONCACAF Women's Olympic Qualifying Championship qualification in a 6–0 win over the Dominican Republic on August 23, 2015.

=== International goals ===
Scores and results list Jamaica's goal tally first

| No. | Date | Venue | Opponent | Score | Result | Competition |
|---|---|---|---|---|---|---|
| 1 | August 23, 2015 | Estadio Panamericano, San Cristóbal, Dominican Republic | Dominican Republic | 6–0 | 6–0 | 2016 CONCACAF Women's Olympic Qualifying Championship qualification |
