= Jo Marie Lewis =

Trinidad and Tobago footballer

Personal information
- Date of birth: 11 December 1993 (age 32)
- Height: 1.65 m (5 ft 5 in)
- Position: Forward

Senior career*
Years	Team	Apps	(Gls)
- St Ann's FC

International career
2010	Trinidad and Tobago U17		
?–?	Trinidad and Tobago		
- * Club domestic league appearances and goals

Jo Marie Lewis (born 11 December 1993) is a Trinidadian footballer who plays as a forward for the Trinidad and Tobago women's national football team. She was part of the team at the 2016 CONCACAF Women's Olympic Qualifying Tournament. On club level she plays for St Ann's FC in Trinidad and Tobago.

== International goals ==
Scores and results list Trinidad and Tobago' goal tally first.

No.	Date	Venue	Opponent	Score	Result	Competition
1	7 July 2011	Estadio Panamericano, San Cristóbal, Dominican Republic	Dominica	5–0	14–1	2012 CONCACAF Women's Olympic Qualifying Tournament qualification
