= Calaigh Copland =

Canadian-Guyanese footballer (born 1987)

Personal information
- Date of birth: 12 March 1987 (age 39)
- Place of birth: Ottawa, Ontario, Canada
- Height: 1.65 m (5 ft 5 in)
- Position: Forward

Team information
- Current team: North Mississauga SC

Youth career
- Peterborough City SC

College career
Years	Team	Apps	(Gls)
2006–2008	Seneca Sting		
2009–2010	Ryerson Rams	28	(11)

Senior career*
Years	Team	Apps	(Gls)
2015–2018	Woodbridge Strikers	23+	(12+)
2019	Durham United FA	13	(4)
2021	Vaughan Azzurri	11	(4)
2022	North Mississauga SC	16	(3)
2023–	Unionville Milliken SC	3	(0)

International career^{‡}
2015–	Guyana	7+	(2+)
- * Club domestic league appearances and goals as of 24 July 2022 ‡ National team caps and goals as of 5 May 2022

Calaigh Copland (born 12 March 1987) is a footballer who plays for Unionville Milliken SC in League1 Ontario. Born in Canada, she represented Guyana at international level.

== Early life ==
Copland was born in Ottawa and raised in Peterborough, Ontario. She later played at the senior amateur level with Peterborough City SC.

== College career ==
From 2006 to 2009, she attended Seneca College, playing for the women's soccer team. She was named an East Division All-Star in the 2008/09 season.

In 2009, she moved to the Ryerson University. In her debut season with Ryerson, she was named an OUA Second-Team All Star, leading the Rams in goals with six.

== Playing career ==
From 2015 to 2018, she played for Woodbridge Strikers in League1 Ontario.

In 2019, she played for Durham United FA.

In 2021, she played for Vaughan Azzurri.

In 2022, she played with North Mississauga SC.

In 2023, she played for Unionville Milliken SC.

== International career ==
In May 2009, she attended an identification camp for the Canada national team.

At age 28, she joined the Guyana women's national football team after being encouraged to try out for the team by her club level teammate and Guyana national team player Donna Carvalhal, who discovered her Guyanese heritage. She played her first international match in August 2015 and scored her first goal on August 21, 2015, against St. Kitts and Nevis. In February 2016, she played against the country of her birth, Canada, at the 2016 CONCACAF Women's Olympic Qualifying Championship.

== International goals ==
Scores and results list Guyana's goal tally first

No.	Date	Venue	Opponent	Score	Result	Competition
1	21 August 2015	Estadio Panamericano, San Cristóbal, Dominican Republic	Saint Kitts and Nevis	6–0	8–0	2016 CONCACAF Women's Olympic Qualifying Championship qualification
2	25 May 2018	Synthetic Track and Field Facility, Leonora, Guyana	Suriname	3–1	6–1	2018 CONCACAF Women's Championship qualification
