= Chinyelu Asher =

Jamaican footballer (born 1993)

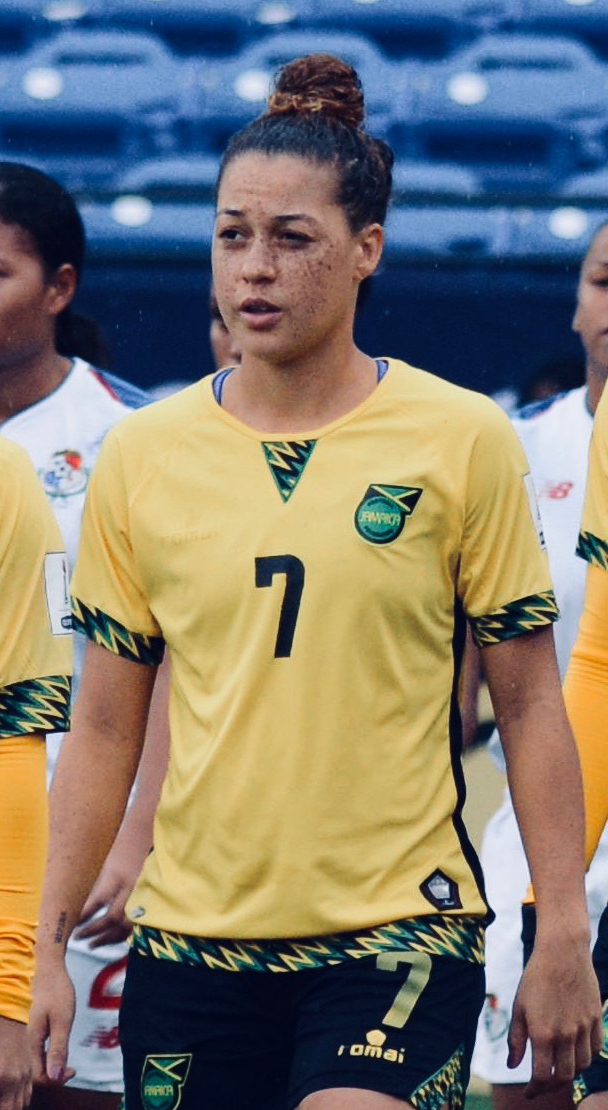
- Asher with Jamaica in 2018

Personal information
- Full name: Chinyelu Bessum Asher
- Date of birth: 20 May 1993 (age 33)
- Place of birth: Silver Spring, Maryland, U.S.
- Height: 1.67 m (5 ft 6 in)
- Position: Midfielder

Team information
- Current team: Panathinaikos

College career
Years	Team	Apps	(Gls)
2011–2013	Purdue Boilermakers	58	(9)
2014	Louisville Cardinals	18	(1)

Senior career*
Years	Team	Apps	(Gls)
2016	BIIK-Kazygurt	7	(0)
2017	Independiente Santa Fe	7	(0)
2018	Washington Spirit Reserves	4	(0)
2019	Stabæk	14	(0)
2021	Washington Spirit	2	(0)
2022	AIK	25	(2)
2023	Coppermine United	8	(1)
2023–2024	Torreense	4	(0)
2024–2025	Mazatlán	30	(0)
2025–2026	DC Power FC	0	(0)
2026–	Panathinaikos		

International career^{‡}
2012	Jamaica U-20	4	(5)
2015–	Jamaica	29	(6)
Medal record
Representing Jamaica
CONCACAF W Championship
Third place	2018 United States
Third place	2022 Mexico
- * Club domestic league appearances and goals as of 20:22, 5 June 2026 (UTC) ‡ National team caps and goals as of 10 June 2021 (UTC)

Chinyelu Bessum Asher (born 20 May 1993) is a professional footballer who plays as a midfielder for Panathinaikos in the Greek A Division. Born in the United States, she represents Jamaica internationally.

== Early life ==
Chinyelu Asher started playing football at age 9, was taught how to play by her father, Kevin Asher, who is Jamaican. Asher ran track and cross country throughout high school, making repeated appearances to Nationals and Junior Olympics. Simultaneously, Asher played with Freestate United and would play in her school's boys' team during trainings.

== College career ==
Between 2011 and 2013, Asher played for the Purdue Boilermakers. She later transferred to Louisville Cardinals in 2014.

== Club career ==
Asher joined BIIK-Kazygurt in 2016 and played 7 matches of the 2016–17 UEFA Women's Champions League. She later joined Santa Fe, where her team won the 2017 season and post-season tournament and played all games in the 2017 Copa Libertadores Femenina. In 2018, Asher was invited to attend preseason and was a non-roster player for Washington Spirit. Asher joined Stabæk in January 2019.

Asher re-joined Washington Spirit on 8 April 2021.

On 4 July 2025, Asher signed a contract with DC Power FC of the USL Super League. She failed to make an appearance for the team before the end of her first season with DC, at which point the club declined her contract option, releasing her.

== International career ==
Although born in the United States, Asher qualified to represent Jamaica through her father, who is Jamaican. Asher made her debut with the Jamaica U-20 in 2012 during the 2012 CONCACAF Women's U-20 Championship. Asher made her senior debut in the 2016 CONCACAF Women's Olympic Qualifying Championship qualification, on 25 August 2015 versus the Dominican Republic.

Asher was selected for Jamaica's 2019 FIFA Women's World Cup squad. She made her World Cup debut during the team's first group stage match against Brazil in Grenoble.

== Personal life ==
Asher's mother is of Cameroonian descent and father is of Afro-Jamaican descent, and played soccer collegiately at Howard University. Asher has an older brother named Daniel Asher, who played soccer at Saint Leo University. Asher is the second youngest of five siblings.

== Career statistics ==
Scores and results list Jamaica's goal tally first

No.	Date	Venue	Opponent	Score	Result	Competition
1	25 August 2015	Estadio Panamericano, San Cristóbal, Dominican Republic	Dominica	7–0	13–0	2016 CONCACAF Women's Olympic Qualifying Championship qualification
2	11 May 2018	Stade Sylvio Cator, Port-au-Prince, Haiti	Martinique	1–0	3–0	2018 CONCACAF Women's Championship qualification
3	23 July 2018	Estadio Moderno Julio Torres, Barranquilla, Colombia	Colombia	1–0	2–1	2018 Central American and Caribbean Games
4	2 September 2018	National Stadium, Kingston, Jamaica	Cuba	1–0	6–1	2018 CONCACAF Women's Championship qualification
5	2 September 2018	National Stadium, Kingston, Jamaica	Cuba	6–0	6–1	2018 CONCACAF Women's Championship qualification
