= Ashley Rivera =

Ashley Rivera may refer to:

- Ashley Rivera (footballer)
- Ashley Rivera (actress)
