= Kai-Lin Hernandez =

Jamaican footballer

Personal information
- Date of birth: 1995 (age 30–31) or 1996 (age 29–30)
- Place of birth: Florida, United States
- Height: 1.78 m (5 ft 10 in)
- Position: Midfielder

College career
Years	Team	Apps	(Gls)
2013–2016	High Point Panthers	66	(1)

International career
2015	Jamaica	1+	(1)

Kai-Lin Hernandez (born 1995 or 1996) is an American-born Jamaican footballer who plays as a midfielder for the Jamaica national team.

== International career ==
Raised in the American city of Homestead, Florida, Hernandez was born to a Jamaican mother and a Colombian father. She represented Jamaica at the 2016 CONCACAF Women's Olympic Qualifying Championship qualification.

=== International goals ===
Scores and results list Jamaica's goal tally first

No.	Date	Venue	Opponent	Score	Result	Competition
1	August 25, 2015	Estadio Panamericano, San Cristóbal, Dominican Republic	Dominica	4–0	13–0	2016 CONCACAF Women's Olympic Qualifying Championship qualification
