= Karina Socarrás =

Puerto Rican footballer

Personal information
- Full name: Karina Socarrás Villalonga
- Date of birth: 28 November 1993 (age 32)
- Place of birth: San Juan, Puerto Rico
- Height: 1.68 m (5 ft 6 in)
- Position: Forward

Team information
- Current team: AaB

Senior career*
Years	Team	Apps	(Gls)
2017	Cúcuta Deportivo	6	(0)
2017–2018	Málaga CF Femenino	21	(10)
2018–2019	Puerto Rico Sol FC	18	(36)
2019–2020	Bayamón FC Femenino	8	(32)
2020–2023	Marítimo	54	(13)
2024-2025	Volos	17	(19)
2025-2026	1207 Antalya	10	(0)
2026	Chalkida WFC	7	(14)
2026–	AaB	10	(6)

International career^{‡}
2012	Puerto Rico U20	5	(0)
2012–	Puerto Rico	25	(25)
- * Club domestic league appearances and goals ‡ National team caps and goals as of 19 February 2022

Karina Socarrás Villalonga (born 28 November 1993), known simply as Karina, is a Puerto Rican footballer who plays as a forward for the Danish A-Liga club AaB and the Puerto Rico women's national team.

== Club career ==
In September 2025, Socarrás moved to Turkey, and signed with 1207 Antalya to play in the Super League.

== International career ==
On August 21, 2015, Socarrás scored six goals in a 12–0 win against Grenada, two days later Socarrás scored four goals in a 9–0 win against Aruba. On November 18, 2015, Socarrás helped Puerto Rico qualify for the 2016 Olympic Games qualifying tournament in Frisco, Texas scoring a goal against Guyana at the 2016 CONCACAF Women's Olympic Qualifying Championship qualification semi-finals. She represented Puerto Rico at the 2016 CONCACAF Women's Olympic Qualifying Championship.

=== International goals ===
As of match played February 19, 2022. Scores and results list Puerto Rico's goal tally first, score column indicates score after each Socarrás goal.

List of international goals scored by Karina Socarrás
No.	Date	Venue	Opponent	Score	Result	Competition
1.	23 May 2014	Juan Ramón Loubriel Stadium, Bayamón, Puerto Rico	Barbados	1–0	1–0	2014 CFU Women's Caribbean Cup
2	23 August 2014	Ato Boldon Stadium, Couva, Trinidad and Tobago	Bermuda	1–0	5–1	2014 CFU Women's Caribbean Cup
3	23 August 2014	Ato Boldon Stadium, Couva, Trinidad and Tobago	Bermuda	4–0	5–1	2014 CFU Women's Caribbean Cup
4	21 August 2015	Juan Ramón Loubriel Stadium, Bayamón, Puerto Rico	Grenada	1–0	12–0	2016 CONCACAF Women's Olympic Qualifying Championship
5	21 August 2015	Juan Ramón Loubriel Stadium, Bayamón, Puerto Rico	Grenada	2–0	12–0	2016 CONCACAF Women's Olympic Qualifying Championship
6	21 August 2015	Juan Ramón Loubriel Stadium, Bayamón, Puerto Rico	Grenada	6–0	12–0	2016 CONCACAF Women's Olympic Qualifying Championship
7	21 August 2015	Juan Ramón Loubriel Stadium, Bayamón, Puerto Rico	Grenada	10–0	12–0	2016 CONCACAF Women's Olympic Qualifying Championship
8	21 August 2015	Juan Ramón Loubriel Stadium, Bayamón, Puerto Rico	Grenada	11–0	12–0	2016 CONCACAF Women's Olympic Qualifying Championship
9	21 August 2015	Juan Ramón Loubriel Stadium, Bayamón, Puerto Rico	Grenada	12–0	12–0	2016 CONCACAF Women's Olympic Qualifying Championship
10	23 August 2015	Juan Ramón Loubriel Stadium, Bayamón, Puerto Rico	Aruba	3–0	9–0	2016 CONCACAF Women's Olympic Qualifying Championship
11	23 August 2015	Juan Ramón Loubriel Stadium, Bayamón, Puerto Rico	Aruba	4–0	9–0	2016 CONCACAF Women's Olympic Qualifying Championship
12	23 August 2015	Juan Ramón Loubriel Stadium, Bayamón, Puerto Rico	Aruba	6–0	9–0	2016 CONCACAF Women's Olympic Qualifying Championship
13	23 August 2015	Juan Ramón Loubriel Stadium, Bayamón, Puerto Rico	Aruba	8–0	9–0	2016 CONCACAF Women's Olympic Qualifying Championship
14	1 November 2015	Ato Boldon Stadium, Couva, Trinidad and Tobago	Guyana	1–0	1–0	2016 CONCACAF Women's Olympic Qualifying Championship
15	5 May 2018	Estadio Panamericano, San Cristóbal, Dominican Republic	Anguilla	1–0	10–0	2018 CONCACAF Women's Championship qualification
16	9 May 2018	Estadio Panamericano, San Cristóbal, Dominican Republic	Cuba	1–0	2–2	2018 CONCACAF Women's Championship qualification
17	5 October 2019	Juan Ramón Loubriel Stadium, Bayamón, Puerto Rico	Suriname	3–0	6–1	2020 CONCACAF Women's Olympic Qualifying Championship qualification
18	5 October 2019	Juan Ramón Loubriel Stadium, Bayamón, Puerto Rico	Suriname	5–1	6–1	2020 CONCACAF Women's Olympic Qualifying Championship qualification
19	20 October 2021	Juan Ramón Loubriel Stadium, Bayamón, Puerto Rico	Guyana	2–0	6–1	Friendly
20	20 October 2021	Juan Ramón Loubriel Stadium, Bayamón, Puerto Rico	Guyana	3–0	6–1	Friendly
21	17 February 2022	Estadio Centroamericano, Mayagüez, Puerto Rico	Antigua and Barbuda	4–0	4–0	2022 CONCACAF W Championship qualifying
22	19 February 2022	Estadio Centroamericano, Mayagüez, Puerto Rico	Anguilla	2–0	0–9	2022 CONCACAF W Championship qualifying
23	19 February 2022	Estadio Centroamericano, Mayagüez, Puerto Rico	Anguilla	5–0	0–9	2022 CONCACAF W Championship qualifying
24	19 February 2022	Estadio Centroamericano, Mayagüez, Puerto Rico	Anguilla	6–0	0–9	2022 CONCACAF W Championship qualifying
25	19 February 2022	Estadio Centroamericano, Mayagüez, Puerto Rico	Anguilla	7–0	0–9	2022 CONCACAF W Championship qualifying
