= Ashley Johnson (footballer) =

Puerto Rican footballer (born 1990)

Personal information
- Full name: Ashley Marie Johnson Manso
- Date of birth: 4 January 1990 (age 36)
- Place of birth: United States
- Position: Forward

College career
Years	Team	Apps	(Gls)
2008	Radford Highlanders		

International career^{‡}
2016–	Puerto Rico	1+	(0)
- ‡ National team caps and goals as of 10 February 2016

Ashley Marie Johnson Manso (born 4 January 1990) is an American-born Puerto Rican footballer who plays as a forward. She has been a member of the Puerto Rico Women's National Team. She is the older sister of fellow international player, Kelley Johnson.

== Early life ==
Johnson was raised in Springfield, Virginia.

== International career ==
Johnson capped for Puerto Rico at senior level during the 2016 CONCACAF Women's Olympic Qualifying Championship.
