= Selimar Pagán =

Puerto Rican footballer

Personal information
- Full name: Selimar Pagán Rivera
- Date of birth: 6 November 1993 (age 32)
- Place of birth: San Juan, Puerto Rico
- Height: 1.60 m (5 ft 3 in)
- Position: Forward

Team information
- Current team: Puerto Rico Sol
- Number: 7

Senior career*
| Years | Team | Apps | (Gls) |
| 2012–2016 | Bayamón FC | | |
| 2017 | Cúcuta Deportivo | | |
| 2018 | Puerto Rico Pride | 7 | (5) |
| 2018– | Puerto Rico Sol | 16 | (19) |

International career^{‡}
| | Puerto Rico | | (6) |
- * Club domestic league appearances and goals as of 4 February 2019 ‡ National team caps and goals as of 11 May 2018

Selimar Pagán Rivera (born 6 November 1993) is a Puerto Rican footballer who plays for Puerto Rico Sol FC and the Puerto Rico women's national team.

== Club career ==
A Bayamón FC product, Pagán played for Colombian Women's Football League club Cúcuta Deportivo in 2017 and for Women's Premier Soccer League team Puerto Rico Pride in 2018. She joined Puerto Rico Sol in mid-2018.

== International goals ==
Scores and results list Puerto Rico's goal tally first

| No. | Date | Venue | Opponent | Score | Result | Competition |
|---|---|---|---|---|---|---|
| 1 | 21 August 2015 | Juan Ramón Loubriel Stadium, Bayamón, Puerto Rico | Grenada | 5–0 | 12–0 | 2016 CONCACAF Women's Olympic Qualifying Championship qualification |
| 2 | 23 August 2015 | Juan Ramón Loubriel Stadium, Bayamón, Puerto Rico | Aruba | 2–0 | 9–0 | 2016 CONCACAF Women's Olympic Qualifying Championship qualification |
| 3 | 25 August 2015 | Juan Ramón Loubriel Stadium, Bayamón, Puerto Rico | Haiti | 3–1 | 3–2 | 2016 CONCACAF Women's Olympic Qualifying Championship qualification |
| 4 | 5 May 2018 | Estadio Panamericano, Dominican Republic, Dominican Republic | Anguilla | 2–0 | 10–0 | 2018 CONCACAF Women's Championship qualification |
| 5 | 5 May 2018 | Estadio Panamericano, Dominican Republic, Dominican Republic | Anguilla | 5–0 | 10–0 | 2018 CONCACAF Women's Championship qualification |
| 6 | 5 May 2018 | Estadio Panamericano, Dominican Republic, Dominican Republic | Anguilla | 9–0 | 10–0 | 2018 CONCACAF Women's Championship qualification |
| 7 | 11 May 2018 | Estadio Panamericano, Dominican Republic, Dominican Republic | Aruba | 4–0 | 5–0 | 2018 CONCACAF Women's Championship qualification |
