= Alison Heydorn =

Guyanese footballer (born 1984)

Personal information
- Date of birth: 5 December 1984 (age 41)
- Place of birth: Canada
- Position: Forward

Youth career
- 2003–2006: Central Michigan Chippewas

International career^{‡}
| Years | Team | Apps | (Gls) |
| 2010– | Guyana | 10 | (5) |
- ‡ National team caps and goals as of 11:41, 4 October 2015 (UTC)

Alison Heydorn (born 5 December 1984) is a Canadian-born Guyanese international footballer. She played college soccer at Central Michigan.

== International goals ==
Scores and results list Guyana's goal tally first

| No. | Date | Venue | Opponent | Score | Result | Competition |
|---|---|---|---|---|---|---|
| 1 | 5 March 2010 | Georgetown Cricket Club Ground, Georgetown, Guyana | Suriname | 2–0 | 2–0 | 2010 CONCACAF Women's World Cup Qualifying qualification |
| 2 | 7 March 2010 | Georgetown Cricket Club Ground, Georgetown, Guyana | Saint Vincent and the Grenadines | 1–0 | 1–0 | 2010 CONCACAF Women's World Cup Qualifying qualification |
| 3 | 12 May 2010 | Marvin Lee Stadium, Macoya, Trinidad and Tobago | Saint Lucia | 3–0 | 8–0 | 2010 CONCACAF Women's World Cup Qualifying qualification |
| 4 | 12 May 2010 | Marvin Lee Stadium, Macoya, Trinidad and Tobago | Saint Lucia | 6–0 | 8–0 | 2010 CONCACAF Women's World Cup Qualifying qualification |
| 5 | 12 May 2010 | Marvin Lee Stadium, Macoya, Trinidad and Tobago | Saint Lucia | 8–0 | 8–0 | 2010 CONCACAF Women's World Cup Qualifying qualification |
| 6 | 21 August 2015 | Estadio Panamericano, San Cristóbal, Dominican Republic | Saint Kitts and Nevis | 7–0 | 8–0 | 2016 CONCACAF Women's Olympic Qualifying Championship qualification |
| 7 | 14 February 2016 | BBVA Compass Stadium, Houston, United States | Guatemala | 2–1 | 2–1 | 2016 CONCACAF Women's Olympic Qualifying Championship |

== See also ==
- List of Guyana women's international footballers
