= Janelle McGee =

Trinidadian footballer (born 1992)

Personal information
- Date of birth: 1992 (age 33–34)
- Place of birth: Vallejo, California, United States
- Height: 1.80 m (5 ft 11 in)
- Position: Forward

Youth career
- 2007–2010: Vanden Vikings

College career
Years	Team	Apps	(Gls)
2011	New Mexico Highlands Cowgirls		
2013	Cal State Dominguez Hills Toros	17	(3)

International career^{‡}
2011–2012	Trinidad and Tobago U20	3	(3)
2011–	Trinidad and Tobago	1	(1)
- ‡ National team caps and goals as of 11 January 2012.

Janelle Elizabeth McGee (born 1992) is an American-born Trinidad and Tobago former footballer who played as a forward for the Trinidad and Tobago women's national team.

== Early life ==
McGee was raised in Vacaville, California.

== High school and college career ==
McGee attended Vanden High School in Fairfield, California, the New Mexico Highlands University in Las Vegas, New Mexico and the California State University, Dominguez Hills in Carson, California.

== International career ==
McGee capped for Trinidad and Tobago at the senior level during the 2012 CONCACAF Women's Olympic Qualifying Tournament qualification.

=== International goals ===
Scores and results list Trinidad and Tobago' goal tally first.

No.	Date	Venue	Opponent	Score	Result	Competition	Ref.
1	7 July 2011	Estadio Panamericano, San Cristóbal, Dominican Republic	Dominica	3–0	14–1	2012 CONCACAF Women's Olympic Qualifying Tournament qualification	
