= Jenelle Cunningham =

Trinidad and Tobago footballer

Personal information
- Date of birth: 29 April 1990 (age 36)
- Height: 1.70 m (5 ft 7 in)
- Position: Defender

Youth career
- Victory Christian Academy

College career
Years	Team	Apps	(Gls)
2008–2012	Murray State Racers	52	(2)

Senior career*
Years	Team	Apps	(Gls)
- NBAA Strikers
- Real Demension FC

International career^{‡}
2018	Trinidad and Tobago	9	(3)

Managerial career
- 2016–2019: Angelo State (graduate assistant)
- 2019: FIU (assistant)
- * Club domestic league appearances and goals ‡ National team caps and goals as of 7 October 2019

Jenelle Cunningham (born 29 April 1990) is a Trinidadian footballer who plays as a defender. She has been a member of the Trinidad and Tobago women's national team.

== International career ==
Cunningham played for Trinidad and Tobago at senior level in the 2018 CFU Women's Challenge Series and the 2018 CONCACAF Women's Championship (including its qualification).

=== International goals ===
Scores and results list Trinidad and Tobago' goal tally first.

No.	Date	Venue	Opponent	Score	Result	Competition
1	16 February 2016	BBVA Compass Stadium, Houston, United States	Guyana	3–0	5–1	2016 CONCACAF Women's Olympic Qualifying Championship
2	19 May 2018	Ato Boldon Stadium, Couva, Trinidad and Tobago	U.S. Virgin Islands	6–0	10–0	2018 CONCACAF Women's Championship qualification
3	21 May 2018	Ato Boldon Stadium, Couva, Trinidad and Tobago	Dominica	1–0	3–0	2018 CONCACAF Women's Championship qualification
4	27 May 2018	Ato Boldon Stadium, Couva, Trinidad and Tobago	Grenada	2–0	13–0	2018 CONCACAF Women's Championship qualification

== Manager career ==
Cunningham served as a graduate assistant on the Angelo State Rams women's team from 2016 to 2019 after earning her master's degree at the school. In July 2019, she was hired as an assistant coach for the FIU Panthers.
