= Viviana Fiol =

Puerto Rican footballer

Personal information
- Full name: Viviana Fiol Vilches
- Date of birth: 13 July 1989 (age 37)
- Place of birth: Puerto Rico
- Position: Midfielder

Senior career*
Years	Team	Apps	(Gls)
- Criollas Caguas

International career^{‡}
2010	Puerto Rico	5	(0)
- * Club domestic league appearances and goals ‡ National team caps and goals as of 1 August 2010

Viviana “Nana” Fiol Vilches (born 13 July 1989) is a Puerto Rican retired footballer who has played as a midfielder. She has been a member of the Puerto Rico women's national team.
