= Stephanie Colón =

American-born Puerto Rican footballer

Personal information
- Full name: Stephanie Marie Colón Pascual
- Date of birth: 27 January 1992 (age 34)
- Place of birth: Babylon, New York, United States
- Height: 1.63 m (5 ft 4 in)
- Position: Midfielder

College career
Years	Team	Apps	(Gls)
2010–2013	Duquesne Dukes	70	(1)

International career^{‡}
2011–2012	Puerto Rico U20	5	(2)
2016	Puerto Rico	1+	(0)
- ‡ National team caps and goals as of 10 February 2016

Stephanie Marie Colón Pascual (born 27 January 1992) is an American-born Puerto Rican footballer who plays as a midfielder. She has been a member of the Puerto Rico women's national team.

== Early life ==
Colón was raised in Babylon, New York.

== International career ==
Colón capped for Puerto Rico at senior level during the 2016 CONCACAF Women's Olympic Qualifying Championship.
