= Karla Villalobos =

Costa Rican footballer (born 1986)

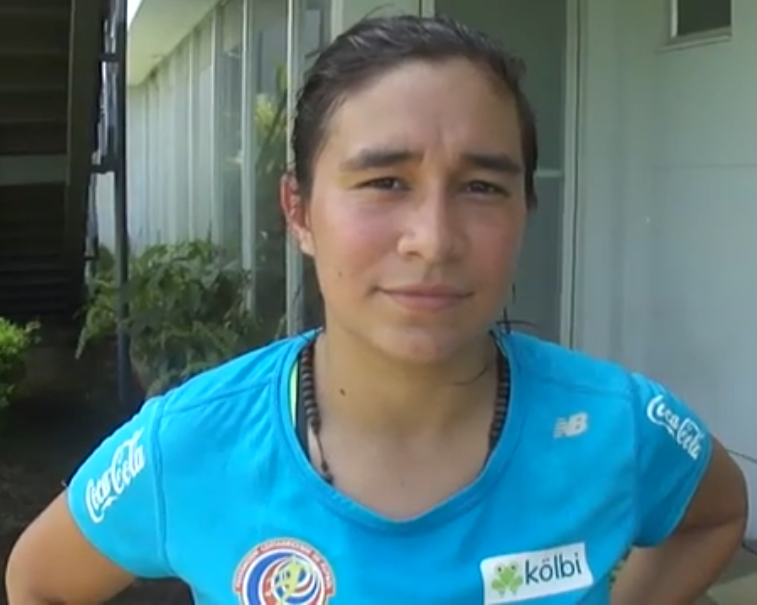
- In a 2015 interview

Personal information
- Full name: Karla Gabriela Villalobos Durán
- Date of birth: 16 July 1986 (age 40)
- Place of birth: Costa Rica
- Position: Forward

Senior career*
Years	Team	Apps	(Gls)
2003	San José	10	(7)
2003-2007	Saprissa	38	(55)
2007-2015	Arenal Coronado	97	(173)
2016-2017	Moravia	16	(63)
2018	UCR	12	(10)
2019	Arenal Coronado	5	(2)
2020-2021	Sporting	22	(18)
2021	Herediano	21	(19)
2024	Puerto Viejo	6	(4)
Total		256	(351)

International career
2004–2017	Costa Rica	29	(21)
- * Club domestic league appearances and goals

Karla Gabriela Villalobos Durán (born 16 July 1986) is a Costa Rican footballer who plays as a forward for Saprissa. She has been a member of the Costa Rica women's national team.

== International career ==
Villalobos played all three of Costa Rica's matches at the 2015 FIFA Women's World Cup. On 13 June 2015, at the 89th minute of Costa Rica's second match in the tournament against South Korea, she scored the team's second goal of the match, which earned them a 2–2 draw.

== Career statistics ==
No.	Date	Venue	Opponent	Score	Result	Competition
1.	18 November 2014	Estadio Unidad Deportiva Hugo Sánchez, Veracruz, Mexico	Venezuela	2–1	2–1	2014 Central American and Caribbean Games
2.	22 November 2014	Estadio Unidad Deportiva Hugo Sánchez, Veracruz, Mexico	Dominican Republic	3–0	6–1	2014 Central American and Caribbean Games
3.	22 November 2014	Estadio Unidad Deportiva Hugo Sánchez, Veracruz, Mexico	Dominican Republic	5–0	6–1	2014 Central American and Caribbean Games
4.	22 November 2014	Estadio Unidad Deportiva Hugo Sánchez, Veracruz, Mexico	Dominican Republic	6–1	6–1	2014 Central American and Caribbean Games
5.	13 June 2015	Olympic Stadium, Montreal, Canada	South Korea	2–2	2–2	2015 FIFA Women's World Cup
6.	12 July 2015	Tim Hortons Field, Hamilton, Canada	Canada	2–0	2–0	2015 Pan American Games
7.	19 August 2015	Finley Stadium, Chattanooga, United States	United States	2–6	2–7	Friendly
8.	2 October 2015	Nicaragua National Football Stadium, Managua, Nicaragua	El Salvador	2–0	3–0	2016 CONCACAF Women's Olympic Qualifying Championship qualification
9.	4 October 2015	Nicaragua National Football Stadium, Managua, Nicaragua	Nicaragua	2–0	5–0	2016 CONCACAF Women's Olympic Qualifying Championship qualification
10.	4 October 2015	Nicaragua National Football Stadium, Managua, Nicaragua	Nicaragua	3–0	5–0	2016 CONCACAF Women's Olympic Qualifying Championship qualification
11.	13 February 2016	Toyota Stadium, Frisco, United States	Puerto Rico	1–0	9–0	2016 CONCACAF Women's Olympic Qualifying Championship
12.	13 February 2016	Toyota Stadium, Frisco, United States	Puerto Rico	4–0	9–0	2016 CONCACAF Women's Olympic Qualifying Championship
13.	13 February 2016	Toyota Stadium, Frisco, United States	Puerto Rico	5–0	9–0	2016 CONCACAF Women's Olympic Qualifying Championship
