= Clara Kichenama-Gourouvaya =

Martiniquais footballer (born 1999)

Personal information
- Date of birth: 10 May 1999 (age 27)
- Place of birth: Saint-Pierre, Martinique
- Position: Defender

International career
Years	Team	Apps	(Gls)
2014–	Martinique		

Clara Kichenama-Gourouvaya (born 10 May 1999) is a Martiniquais footballer who plays as a defender for the Martinique women's team.

== International career ==
Kichenama-Gourouvaya capped for Martinique team at senior level during the 2014 CONCACAF Women's Championship. On the club level, she plays for Emulation in Martinique.
