= Otesha Charles =

Guyanese footballer

Personal information
- Full name: Otesha Luletta Charles
- Date of birth: 14 September 1993 (age 33)
- Place of birth: St. Cuthbert's Mission, Guyana
- Height: 1.64 m (5 ft 5 in)
- Position: Forward

Team information
- Current team: Chatham Town
- Number: 10

Senior career*
Years	Team	Apps	(Gls)
–2016	Millwall Lionesses		
2016–2019	Watford		
2019–2020	Leyton Orient	9	(6)
2020–2023	Gillingham	18	(3)
2023–2025	Billericay Town		
2025-	Chatham Town	8	(1)

International career^{‡}
2011–2012	Guyana U20	5	(4)
2015	Guyana	14	(7)
- * Club domestic league appearances and goals as of 16 December 2025 ‡ National team caps and goals as of 25 July 2024

Otesha Luletta Charles (born 14 September 1993) is a Guyanese footballer who plays as a forward for English club Chatham Town. She has been a member of the Guyana women's national team.

== Career ==
In 2016, she joined Watford F.C. Ladies. Charles joined Gillingham in 2020.

== Personal life ==
Charles was born in Guyana, moving to England when she was 7. She has dual citizenship between Guyana and the UK, and owns a hair salon in Peckham, south London.

== International goals ==
Scores and results list Guyana's goal tally first

No.	Date	Venue	Opponent	Score	Result	Competition
1	21 August 2015	Estadio Panamericano, San Cristóbal, Dominican Republic	Saint Kitts and Nevis	1–0	8–0	2016 CONCACAF Women's Olympic Qualifying Championship qualification
2	21 August 2015	Estadio Panamericano, San Cristóbal, Dominican Republic	Saint Kitts and Nevis	2–0	8–0	2016 CONCACAF Women's Olympic Qualifying Championship qualification
3	21 August 2015	Estadio Panamericano, San Cristóbal, Dominican Republic	Saint Kitts and Nevis	3–0	8–0	2016 CONCACAF Women's Olympic Qualifying Championship qualification
