= Kelley Johnson (footballer) =

Puerto Rican footballer

Personal information
- Full name: Kelley Johnson Manso
- Date of birth: 19 December 1992 (age 33)
- Place of birth: Puerto Rico
- Height: 1.70 m (5 ft 7 in)
- Positions: Defender; midfielder

Team information
- Current team: Skövde KIK

College career
Years	Team	Apps	(Gls)
2011–2014	East Carolina Pirates	80	(1)

Senior career*
Years	Team	Apps	(Gls)
- Northern Virginia Majestics
2016–2017	F.C. Indiana	10+	(0+)
2018	Puerto Rico Sol	0	(0)
2019–	Skövde KIK	8	(0)

International career^{‡}
2016–	Puerto Rico	1+	(0)
- * Club domestic league appearances and goals ‡ National team caps and goals as of 11 May 2018

Kelley Johnson Manso (born 19 December 1992) is a Puerto Rican footballer who plays for Swedish club Skövde KIK and the Puerto Rico women's national team.

== Club career ==
She had played for the Northern Virginia Majestics. A former F.C. Indiana player, Johnson signed for Mayagüez-based club Puerto Rico Sol in last July 2018.

== International career ==
Springfield, Virginia-raised Johnson was eligible to play for the United States or Puerto Rico, choosing the latter.

Johnson capped for Puerto Rico during the 2016 CONCACAF Women's Olympic Qualifying Championship.

== Personal life ==
Johnson's older sister Ashley also plays for the Puerto Rico women's national football team.
