= Alicia Navas =

Guatemalan footballer

Personal information
- Full name: Alicia Esperanza Navas Villanueva
- Date of birth: 26 August 1991 (age 35)
- Position: Goalkeeper

Senior career*
Years	Team	Apps	(Gls)
2015	Jutiapanecas		

International career^{‡}
2014	Guatemala	2	(0)
- * Club domestic league appearances and goals ‡ National team caps and goals as of 20 October 2014

Alicia Esperanza Navas Villanueva (born 26 August 1991) is a Guatemalan retired footballer who played as a goalkeeper. She has been a member of the Guatemala women's national team.

== International career ==
Navas capped for Guatemala at senior level during the 2014 CONCACAF Women's Championship.
