= Ana Lucía Martínez =

Guatemalan footballer (born 1990)

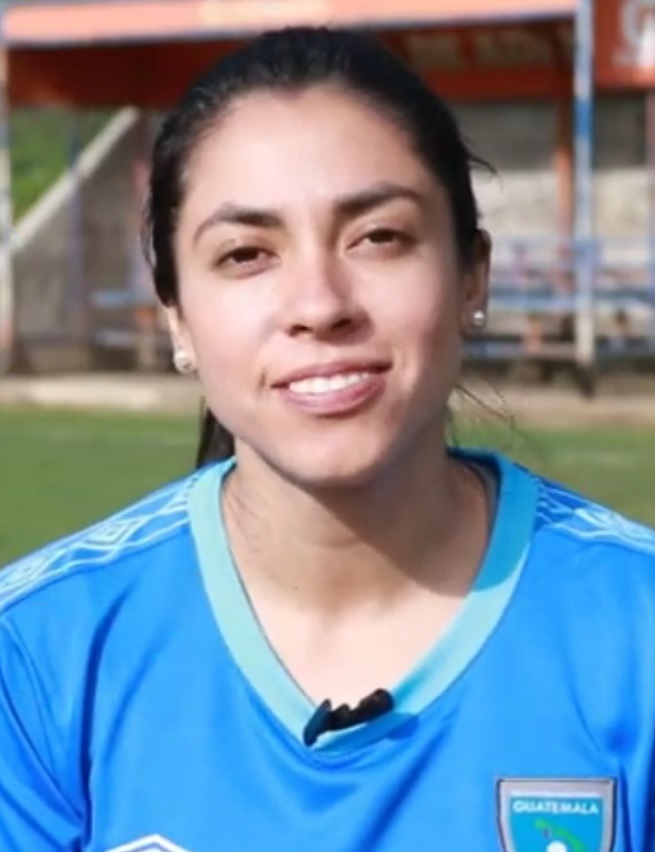
- Martínez with Guatemala in 2019

Personal information
- Full name: Ana Lucía Martínez Maldonado
- Date of birth: 8 January 1990 (age 36)
- Place of birth: Guatemala City, Guatemala
- Height: 1.57 m (5 ft 2 in)
- Positions: Forward; winger

Team information
- Current team: Cruz Azul
- Number: 9

Senior career*
Years	Team	Apps	(Gls)
2007–2014	Unifut	9	(18)
2014	Houston Dash		(3)
2014–2015	Dínamo Guadalajara		(9)
2015–2016	Rayo Vallecano	19	(3)
2016–2018	Sporting Huelva	55	(4)
2018–2020	Madrid CFF	24	(2)
2020–2021	Napoli	5	(0)
2021	→ Roma CF (loan)	14	(9)
2021–2022	Sampdoria	20	(5)
2022–2023	Pomigliano	29	(9)
2024–2025	Monterrey	37	(11)
2025–	Cruz Azul	22	(7)

International career
2010	Guatemala U20	3	(2)
2009–	Guatemala	40	(21)
- * Club domestic league appearances and goals as of 1 February 2026

Ana Lucía Martínez Maldonado (born 8 January 1990), commonly known as Analú, is a Guatemalan professional footballer who plays as a forward for Liga Femenil club Cruz Azul and captains the Guatemala women's national team.

== Career ==
Martínez spent seven years with Guatemalan women's football championship club Unifut, before joining National Women's Soccer League expansion team Houston Dash in June 2014. After failing to break into Houston Dash's first team, she moved to Spain in November 2014 and agreed a contract with Segunda División team Dínamo Guadalajara. After hitting nine goals in her first season she moved to Madrid-based Primera División club Rayo Vallecano, then signed for Sporting Huelva a year later.

Her main characteristics are speed, dribbling and game vision. She started playing soccer at a very young age, at 3 years old her parents bought her her first soccer shoes. The skill and energy in the sport was noticed from an early age. Her first team was at age 9 in a league of the mars field, in the team "Travesuras", being the first girl registered in the league and opening the door so that other girls could later compete in that league. She played in two men's teams, with the Travesuras and with the Estudiantes where, being a male league, she was once a scorer of the tournament. Her taste for sports were made in the Vienna-Guatemalan College, where she practiced athletics, swimming and different team sports, such as football, basketball and volleyball. In intercollegiate competitions "Analu" has more than 80 medals in the different competitions. She joined the school's women's soccer team at age 11, being the youngest and affectionately nicknamed her "chiquitina", got 2 goalscorer trophies and won the Austrian Cup 6 times, the German Cup and the Montessori Cup in 2006 and 2007.

At age 14 she made her debut in the National Women's League in Guatemala, playing only one tournament with the "Municipal" team. At age 17, almost at the end of high school studies, "Analu" made tryouts with the under 20 selection and which was called to be part of the under 20 selection of Guatemala. She had two participations with the under 20 team. In 2009, she had her first call for an absolute team and from that first call to selection, she continues to represent Guatemala and is currently the captain of the senior team.

After her first participation in selection under 20, she joined the Unifut team in 2007, being 6 times National champion and 3 times top scorer of the tournament. In 2009 the first challenges began, having to combine sports with university studies, "Analu" studied chemical engineering at the University of San Carlos in Guatemala and despite the difficulties of absence from classes for trips with the national team, she was able to finish her career in 5 years, achieving graduation in the following two years. In the university, she also had the opportunity to be involved in soccer, representing her faculty in interfaculty, inter university tournaments and representing the University of San Carlos in international tournaments, both in indoor soccer and football. With her participation in the national team she manages to open the first opportunity to play abroad and decides to take the risk and travel to Houston Texas, to perform some tests with the team in 2014, despite not getting a professional contract, the club gives you the opportunity to train with them for 3 months and be part of the club as a reserve player.

After her return to Guatemala, "Analu" decided to look for her dream of being a professional soccer player and with the help of some people, manages to find a link in Spain, with the second division club Dinamo de Guadalajara, in which she managed to excel by achieving 9 goals in the competition. Her next step was important as she had the opportunity to test with the Rayo Vallecano club in May 2015 and in which she signed for in the 2015–2016 season. The first season in first division of Spain, with Rayo Vallecano in Madrid, the results in the first Guatemalan soccer player in a professional league and first legionary, opening gap in Guatemalan women's football. With Rayo Vallecano, she had an excellent season and the interest of other clubs and sports clubs has opened up in Huelva, who she has an offer to be part of in the 2016–2017 season. At the Sporting Club de Huelva, the season starts with a few minutes but the length of the season reaches a maximum level and becomes one of the protagonists of the sporting attack for the club that offers renewal for the following season. "Analu" takes advantage of her stay in Huelva, carries out Master's studies in economics, Finance and Computing with a specialty in Marketing and Big Data and those that end in November 2017.

The growth of "Analu" in the Spanish league is remarkable, which means that at the end of the second season at Sporting Club de Huelva, different clubs are interested in her. "Analu" after several days of uncertainty, eventually signed for Madrid Club de Fútbol Femenino in 2018, which has one of the best quarry of women's football in Spain.

== Career statistics ==
=== International goals ===
No.	Date	Venue	Opponent	Score	Result	Competition
1.	6 October 2011	Estadio Cementos Progreso, Guatemala City, Guatemala	Costa Rica	1–1	2–5	2012 CONCACAF Women's Olympic Qualifying Tournament qualification
2.	6 October 2011	Estadio Cementos Progreso, Guatemala City, Guatemala	Costa Rica	2–3	2–5	2012 CONCACAF Women's Olympic Qualifying Tournament qualification
3.	8 October 2011	Estadio Cementos Progreso, Guatemala City, Guatemala	El Salvador	1–0	2–1	2012 CONCACAF Women's Olympic Qualifying Tournament qualification
4.	24 January 2012	BC Place, Vancouver, Canada	Dominican Republic	5–0	6–0	2012 CONCACAF Women's Olympic Qualifying Tournament
5.	6 March 2013	San José, Costa Rica	Panama	2–0	3–2	2013 Central American Games
6.	15 March 2013	San José, Costa Rica	Panama	1–0	5–3	2013 Central American Games
7.	24 May 2014	Estadio Mateo Flores, Guatemala City, Guatemala	Belize	5–0	5–0	2014 CONCACAF Women's Championship qualification
8.	11 February 2016	BBVA Compass Stadium, Houston, United States	Trinidad and Tobago	1–0	1–2	2016 CONCACAF Women's Olympic Qualifying Championship
9.	14 February 2016	BBVA Compass Stadium, Houston, United States	Guyana	1–0	1–2	2016 CONCACAF Women's Olympic Qualifying Championship
10.	8 October 2019	Estadio Rommel Fernández, Panama City, Panama	Panama	1–2	1–3	2020 CONCACAF Women's Olympic Qualifying Championship qualification
11.	29 June 2023	Estadio Las Delicias, Santa Tecla, El Salvador	Haiti	1–0	3–1	2023 Central American and Caribbean Games
12.	29 June 2023	Estadio Las Delicias, Santa Tecla, El Salvador	Haiti	2–1	3–1	2023 Central American and Caribbean Games
13.	29 June 2023	Estadio Las Delicias, Santa Tecla, El Salvador	Haiti	3–1	3–1	2023 Central American and Caribbean Games
14.	24 September 2023	Estadio Universitario, Penonomé, Panama	Panama	2–2	3–2	2024 CONCACAF W Gold Cup qualification
15.	24 September 2023	Estadio Universitario, Penonomé, Panama	Panama	3–2	3–2	2024 CONCACAF W Gold Cup qualification
16.	3 December 2023	Estadio Doroteo Guamuch Flores, Guatemala City, Guatemala	Jamaica	1–0	1–1	2024 CONCACAF W Gold Cup qualification
17.	17 February 2024	Dignity Health Sports Park Track & Field Stadium, Carson, United States	El Salvador	1–3	1–3	2024 CONCACAF W Gold Cup qualification
18.	1 December 2025	Estadio Cementos Progreso, Guatemala City, Guatemala	Bermuda	4–0	4–1	2026 CONCACAF W Championship qualification
19.	28 February 2026	Estadio Manuel Felipe Carrera, Guatemala City, Guatemala	Grenada	4–0	6–0	2026 CONCACAF W Championship qualification
20.	6 March 2026	Truman Bodden Sports Complex, George Town, Cayman Islands	Cayman Islands	3–0	13–0	2026 CONCACAF W Championship qualification
21.	6 March 2026	Truman Bodden Sports Complex, George Town, Cayman Islands	Cayman Islands	7–0	13–0	2026 CONCACAF W Championship qualification
22.	6 March 2026	Truman Bodden Sports Complex, George Town, Cayman Islands	Cayman Islands	8–0	13–0	2026 CONCACAF W Championship qualification

== Personal life ==
"Analu" is the daughter of Civil Engineer Jorge Martínez and Miriam Maldonado (1960–2018), who was professor and researcher at the University of San Carlos of Guatemala and the School of Social Work, director of the University Institute of Women, activists and feminists. "Analu" is the third of four children, with elder brothers Sigrid and Luis Alejandro and a younger brother Julio Camilo.

== Education ==
- Bachelor of Science and Literature with scientific orientation, 2008. She spent 14 years in the same school, obtained the best average of her promotion and was named the best athlete. – Degree in chemical engineering (2009–2015) at the San Carlos University of Guatemala. She obtained an award for excellence in 2011 in the range of 150 credits.

– Title of soccer coach (2014) in the National Football Federation of Guatemala.

– TAFAD course for one year at the IES Ana María Matute, in Guadalajara, Spain.

– Master's degree in economics finance and computing with a specialty in marketing and big data (2016–2017) by the International University of Andalusia and the University of Huelva.

– Postgraduate diploma in sport management (2021–2022) by Johan Cruyff Institute.
