= Woodlyne Robuste =

Haitian footballer (born 1992)

Personal information
- Full name: Ketura Woodlyne Robuste
- Date of birth: 25 April 1992 (age 34)
- Place of birth: Haiti
- Position: Midfielder

College career
Years	Team	Apps	(Gls)
2015	Ancilla Chargers	11	(2)

International career^{‡}
2011–2012	Haiti U20	8	(1)
2014–2015	Haiti	6	(0)
- ‡ National team caps and goals as of 11:03, 4 October 2015 (UTC)

Ketura Woodlyne Robuste (born 25 April 1992), known as Woodlyne Robuste, is a Haitian footballer who plays as a midfielder. She has been a member of the Haiti women's national team.

== International goals ==
Scores and results list Haiti's goal tally first

No.	Date	Venue	Opponent	Score	Result	Competition
1	23 August 2015	Juan Ramón Loubriel Stadium, Bayamón, Puerto Rico	Grenada	2–0	13–0	2016 CONCACAF Women's Olympic Qualifying Championship qualification
