= Ahkeela Mollon =

Trinidadian footballer

Personal information
- Full name: Ahkeela Darcel Mollon
- Date of birth: 2 April 1985 (age 41)
- Place of birth: Chaguanas, Trinidad and Tobago
- Position: Forward

College career
Years	Team	Apps	(Gls)
2004	Young Harris Mountain Lions	?	(56)
2005–2007	South Carolina Gamecocks		

Senior career*
Years	Team	Apps	(Gls)
2002	Petronin		
2004	Diego Martin Secondary School		
2008	Charlotte Lady Eagles		
2009	Kvarnsvedens IK	?	(?)
2010	Djurgården	6	(1)
2011	Stjarnan	7	(1)
2011	Afturelding	6	(0)
2014	Kvarnsvedens IK	21	(7)
2016	La Brea Angels W.F.C		

International career^{‡}
2002–2016	Trinidad and Tobago	39+	(16)

Managerial career
- 2021-2022: Anguilla
- * Club domestic league appearances and goals as of 20:21, 17 November 2015 (UTC) ‡ National team caps and goals as of 20:21, 17 November 2015 (UTC)

Ahkeela Darcel Mollon (born 2 April 1985), also known as Darcel Mollon, is a Trinidadian football coach and former player who played as a forward. She has been a member of the Trinidad and Tobago women's national team.

== International goals ==
Scores and results list Trinidad and Tobago' goal tally first.

No.	Date	Venue	Opponent	Score	Result	Competition
1	5 July 2002	Trinidad and Tobago	Dominica	?–?	13–0	2002 CONCACAF Women's Gold Cup qualification
2	19 May 2006	Larry Gomes Stadium, Arima, Trinidad and Tobago	Grenada	3–0	10–0	2006 CONCACAF Women's Gold Cup qualification
3	19 May 2006	Larry Gomes Stadium, Arima, Trinidad and Tobago	Grenada	5–0	10–0	2006 CONCACAF Women's Gold Cup qualification
4	19 May 2006	Larry Gomes Stadium, Arima, Trinidad and Tobago	Grenada	7–0	10–0	2006 CONCACAF Women's Gold Cup qualification
5	19 May 2006	Larry Gomes Stadium, Arima, Trinidad and Tobago	Grenada	8–0	10–0	2006 CONCACAF Women's Gold Cup qualification
6	23 May 2006	Larry Gomes Stadium, Arima, Trinidad and Tobago	Dominica	6–0	6–0	2006 CONCACAF Women's Gold Cup qualification
7	10 May 2010	Marvin Lee Stadium, Macoya, Trinidad and Tobago	Saint Lucia	5–0	6–1	2010 CONCACAF Women's World Cup Qualifying qualification
8	24 July 2010	Estadio Metropolitano, Mérida, Venezuela	Nicaragua	1–0	4–0	2010 Central American and Caribbean Games
9	24 July 2010	Estadio Metropolitano, Mérida, Venezuela	Nicaragua	3–0	4–0	2010 Central American and Caribbean Games
10	13 November 2015	Ato Boldon Stadium, Couva, Trinidad and Tobago	Saint Lucia	1–0	6–0	2016 CONCACAF Women's Olympic Qualifying Championship qualification
11	13 November 2015	Ato Boldon Stadium, Couva, Trinidad and Tobago	Saint Lucia	6–0	6–0	2016 CONCACAF Women's Olympic Qualifying Championship qualification
12	15 November 2015	Ato Boldon Stadium, Couva, Trinidad and Tobago	Saint Lucia	1–0	8–1	2016 CONCACAF Women's Olympic Qualifying Championship qualification
13	15 November 2015	Ato Boldon Stadium, Couva, Trinidad and Tobago	Saint Lucia	4–0	8–1	2016 CONCACAF Women's Olympic Qualifying Championship qualification
14	15 November 2015	Ato Boldon Stadium, Couva, Trinidad and Tobago	Saint Lucia	6–1	8–1	2016 CONCACAF Women's Olympic Qualifying Championship qualification
15	15 November 2015	Ato Boldon Stadium, Couva, Trinidad and Tobago	Saint Lucia	7–1	8–1	2016 CONCACAF Women's Olympic Qualifying Championship qualification
16	16 February 2016	BBVA Compass Stadium, Houston, United States	Guyana	4–0	5–1	2016 CONCACAF Women's Olympic Qualifying Championship
