= Diana Sáenz =

Costa Rican footballer (born 1989)

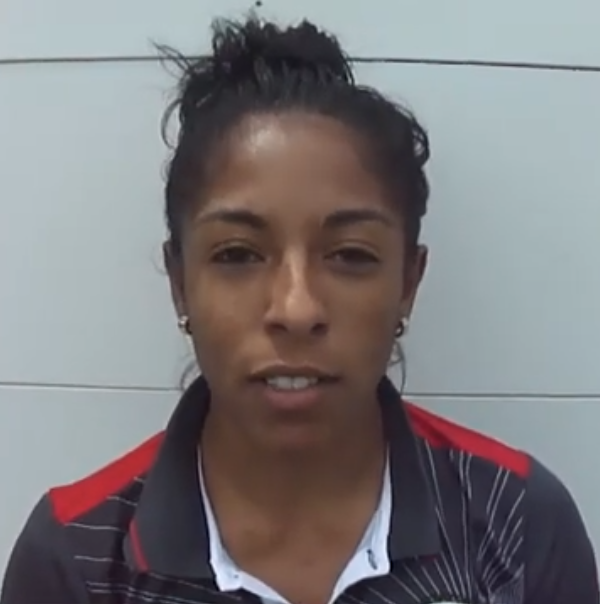
- In a 2015 interview

Personal information
- Full name: Diana Carolina Sáenz Brown
- Date of birth: 15 April 1989 (age 37)
- Place of birth: Vázquez de Coronado, Costa Rica
- Height: 1.51 m (4 ft 11 1/2 in)
- Position: Defender

Team information
- Current team: Herediano

College career
| Years | Team | Apps | (Gls) |
| 2012–2015 | South Florida Bulls | 79 | (3) |

Senior career*
| Years | Team | Apps | (Gls) |
| 2022- | Herediano | | |

International career^{‡}
| 2011–2015 | Costa Rica | 51 | (0) |
- * Club domestic league appearances and goals ‡ National team caps and goals as of 16:59, 18 June 2015 (UTC)

Diana Carolina Sáenz Brown (born 15 April 1989) is a Costa Rican footballer who plays as a defender for the Herediano. She competed at the 2015 FIFA Women's World Cup in Canada.

== International goals ==
| No. | Date | Venue | Opponent | Score | Result | Competition |
|---|---|---|---|---|---|---|
| 1. | 13 February 2016 | Toyota Stadium, Frisco, United States | Puerto Rico | 6–0 | 9–0 | 2016 CONCACAF Women's Olympic Qualifying Championship |

== Honours ==
Costa Rica

Winner

- Central American Games: 2013
