= Nicole Rodríguez =

Puerto Rican footballer

Personal information
- Full name: Nicole Esther Rodríguez Ayala
- Date of birth: 29 August 1992 (age 34)
- Place of birth: Connecticut, United States
- Height: 1.68 m (5 ft 6 in)
- Position: Midfielder

College career
Years	Team	Apps	(Gls)
2010	UConn Huskies		
2011–2013	Notre Dame Fighting Irish	8	(1)

Senior career*
Years	Team	Apps	(Gls)
2014	Honka	4	(0)
2016	Durham FA		
2018	Puerto Rico Sol		
2019	FC Boulder		

International career^{‡}
2011–2012	Puerto Rico U20	5	(1)
2015–	Puerto Rico	2+	(1+)
- * Club domestic league appearances and goals ‡ National team caps and goals as of 7 October 2019

Nicole Esther Rodríguez Ayala (born 29 August 1992) is an American-born Puerto Rican footballer who plays as a midfielder for the Puerto Rico women's national team.

== Early life ==
Rodríguez was raised in Avon, Connecticut. Her parents are from Puerto Rico.

== International goals ==
Scores and results list Puerto Rico's goal tally first.

No.	Date	Venue	Opponent	Score	Result	Competition
1	21 August 2015	Juan Ramón Loubriel Stadium, Bayamón, Puerto Rico	Grenada	7–0	12–0	2016 CONCACAF Women's Olympic Qualifying Championship qualification
