= Carolina Venegas =

Costa Rican footballer (born 1991)

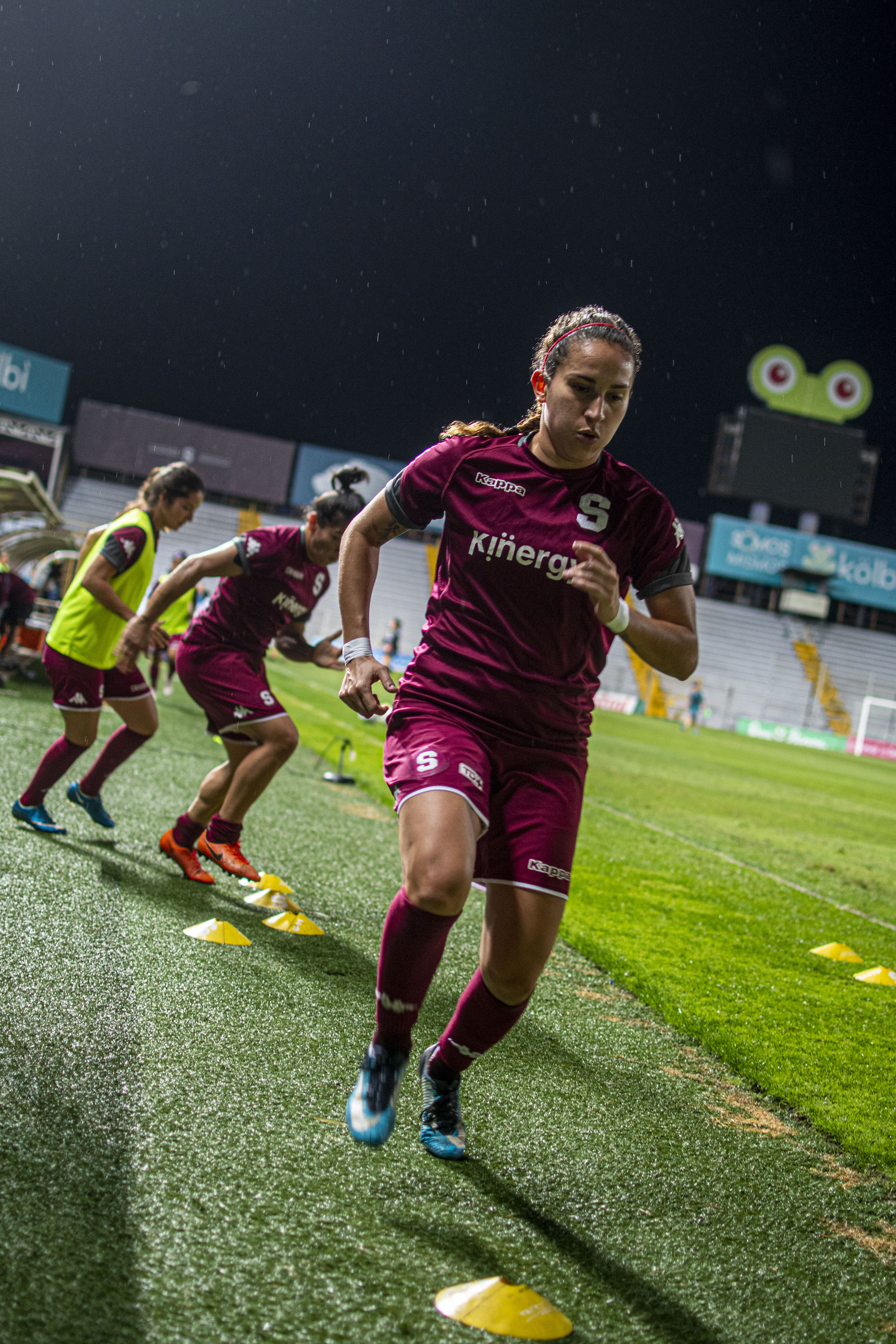
- Venegas warming up before a match with Saprissa in 2019

Personal information
- Full name: Carolina Paola Venegas Morales
- Date of birth: 28 September 1991 (age 35)
- Place of birth: San José, Costa Rica
- Height: 1.66 m (5 ft 5 in)
- Position: Forward

Senior career*
Years	Team	Apps	(Gls)
- Saprissa
2015–2016	Madrid CFF		
2016	Deportivo Saprissa		
2017	Santa Clarita Blue Heat	5	(2)
2017–2018	Sporting Clube de Portugal	3	(4)
2018–2022	Saprissa FF		
2022–2023	Atlas	23	(10)

International career^{‡}
2009–2010	Costa Rica U20	11	(3)
2010–2023	Costa Rica	51	(17)
- * Club domestic league appearances and goals ‡ National team caps and goals as of 00:45, 17 July 2022 (UTC)

Carolina Paola Venegas Morales (born 28 September 1991) is a Costa Rican footballer who plays as a forward. In 2015–16, she played for the Spanish club Madrid CFF.

== International goals ==
No.	Date	Venue	Opponent	Score	Result	Competition
1.	28 April 2010	Estadio Nacional de la UNAN-Managua, Managua, Nicaragua	Honduras	1–0	2–0	2010 CONCACAF Women's World Cup Qualifying qualification
2.	30 April 2010	Estadio Nacional de la UNAN-Managua, Managua, Nicaragua	Nicaragua	2–0	2–0	2010 CONCACAF Women's World Cup Qualifying qualification
3.	30 September 2011	Estadio Cementos Progreso, Guatemala City, Guatemala	Nicaragua	1–0	5–0	2012 CONCACAF Women's Olympic Qualifying Tournament qualification
4.	30 September 2011	Estadio Cementos Progreso, Guatemala City, Guatemala	Nicaragua	2–0	5–0	2012 CONCACAF Women's Olympic Qualifying Tournament qualification
5.	6 March 2013	Estadio Ernesto Rohrmoser, San José, Costa Rica	Belize	11–0	14–0	2013 Central American Games
6.	16 October 2014	Sporting Park, Kansas City, United States	Mexico	1–0	1–0	2014 CONCACAF Women's Championship
7.	18 October 2014	Toyota Park, Bridgeview, United States	Martinique	2–0	6–1	2014 CONCACAF Women's Championship
8.	18 October 2014	Toyota Park, Bridgeview, United States	Martinique	6–1	6–1	2014 CONCACAF Women's Championship
9.	24 October 2014	PPL Park, Chester, United States	Trinidad and Tobago	1–0	1–1 (a.e.t.) (3–0 p)	2014 CONCACAF Women's Championship
10.	20 November 2014	Estadio Unidad Deportiva Hugo Sánchez, Boca del Río, Mexico	Nicaragua	2–0	3–0	2014 Central American and Caribbean Games
11.	30 September 2015	Nicaragua National Football Stadium, Managua, Nicaragua	Guatemala	2–1	2–1	2016 CONCACAF Women's Olympic Qualifying Championship qualification
12.	4 October 2015	Nicaragua National Football Stadium, Managua, Nicaragua	Nicaragua	5–0	5–0	2016 CONCACAF Women's Olympic Qualifying Championship qualification
13.	22 September 2021	Estadio Nacional, San José, Costa Rica	Panama	1–0	3–2	Friendly
14.	17 February 2022	Estadio Nacional, San José, Costa Rica	Saint Kitts and Nevis	3–0	7–0	2022 CONCACAF W Championship qualification
15.	20 February 2022	Bethlehem Soccer Stadium, Saint Croix, US Virgin Islands	U.S. Virgin Islands	3–0	6–0	2022 CONCACAF W Championship qualification
16.	28 June 2022	Sports Complex Fedefutbol-Plycem, San Rafael, Costa Rica	Haiti	2–3	2–4	Friendly

== Personal life ==
Carolina's sister Adriana also played as a forward in the Costa Rican team at the 2015 FIFA Women's World Cup.

== Honours ==
Costa Rica

- Central American Games: 2013
