= Marilyn Rivera =

Guatemalan footballer

Personal information
- Full name: Marilyn Gabriela Rivera Padilla
- Date of birth: February 19, 1992 (age 34)
- Place of birth: Guatemala
- Position: Defender

Team information
- Current team: UNIFUT

Senior career*
Years	Team	Apps	(Gls)
- UNIFUT

International career^{‡}
2010–2012	Guatemala U20	8	(0)
2010–	Guatemala	20	(0)
- * Club domestic league appearances and goals ‡ National team caps and goals as of 22:03, 4 October 2015 (UTC)

Marilyn Rivera (born 19 February 1992) is a Guatemalan international footballer.
