= Ashley Rivera (footballer) =

Puerto Rican footballer

Personal information
- Full name: Ashley M. Rivera Suárez
- Date of birth: 18 July 1995 (age 31)
- Position: Defender

Senior career*
Years	Team	Apps	(Gls)
- Romano SA

International career^{‡}
2016	Puerto Rico	1+	(0)
- * Club domestic league appearances and goals ‡ National team caps and goals as of 10 February 2016

Ashley M. Rivera Suárez (born 18 July 1995) is a Puerto Rican footballer who plays as a defender. She has been a member of the Puerto Rico women's national team.

== International career ==
Rivera capped for Puerto Rico at senior level during the 2016 CONCACAF Women's Olympic Qualifying Championship.
