= Coralia Monterroso =

Guatemalan footballer

Personal information
- Full name: Coralia Andrea Monterroso Asteguieta
- Date of birth: 26 December 1991 (age 34)
- Place of birth: Guatemala
- Position: Fullback

College career
| Years | Team | Apps | (Gls) |
| 2015–2016 | UNB Reds | 18 | (0) |

International career^{‡}
| 2010–2014 | Guatemala | 28 | (3) |
- ‡ National team caps and goals as of 22:58, 6 October 2015 (UTC)

Coralia Andrea Monterroso Asteguieta (born 26 December 1991) is a Guatemalan footballer who plays as a fullback. She has been a member of the Guatemala women's national team. She is the sister of fellow international player María Amanda Monterroso.

== College career ==
Monterroso has spent the past two years playing soccer in New Brunswick, Canada where she is an Academic All Canadian (3.5 GPA and above) at the University of New Brunswick.

== International goals ==
Scores and results list Guatemala's goal tally first.

| No. | Date | Venue | Opponent | Score | Result | Competition |
|---|---|---|---|---|---|---|
| 1 | 2 October 2011 | Estadio Cementos Progreso, Guatemala City, Guatemala | Nicaragua | 4–0 | 4–0 | 2012 CONCACAF Women's Olympic Qualifying Tournament qualification |

Education

• September 2015 – Present: University of New Brunswick, Canada: MA, Master of Arts in Sport and Recreation Studies: Academic All Canadian

• 2010- 2014: Francisco Marroquín University, Guatemala: Bachelor of Science and Licentiate degree in Entrepreneurial Engineering: Graduated with honors: Cum Laude

• July 2012: ISEBA University, Barcelona, Spain: Business Initiation Diploma

Soccer Career

• May 2016 - Aug 2016: Member of Lancaster Inferno Team – UWS League (pro-am league – United States)

• Sept 2015–present: Member of the UNB Women's Soccer Team (Canada): Awards: Academic All Canadian

• Feb – Oct 2014 : Football Coaching Course FIFA (License) Level 1 by Guatemalan Football Federation

• Feb - Oct 2015 : Football Coaching Course FIFA (License) Level 2 by Guatemalan Football Federation

• Since 2007: Member of the Women's National Soccer Team of Guatemala Categories: - Under 17 National Team (Captain) - Under 20 National Team - Senior National Team (Captain)

Participation in different World Cup Qualifiers and Olympic Games Qualifiers

International Achievements: Bronze Medal in Central American and Caribbean Games, in Mérida, Venezuela, 2010 Bronze Medal in Central American Games, Costa Rica, 2013 Silver Medal in Central American Scholar Games, CODICADER, Honduras, 2008
