= 2016 CONCACAF Women's Olympic Qualifying Championship =

4th edition of the CONCACAF Women's Olympic Qualifying Tournament

CONCACAF WOMEN'S OLYMPIC QUALIFYING TEXAS 2016

Tournament details
- Host country: United States
- Dates: 10–21 February
- Teams: 8 (from 1 confederation)
- Venue: 2 (in 2 host cities)

Final positions
- Champions: United States (4th title)
- Runners-up: Canada

Tournament statistics
- Matches played: 15
- Goals scored: 78 (5.2 per match)
- Top scorer(s): (United States) Crystal Dunn (Costa Rica) Raquel Rodríguez (6 goals each)
- Best player: (United States) Morgan Brian
- Best goalkeeper: (United States) Hope Solo
- Fair play award: United States

The 2016 CONCACAF Women's Olympic Qualifying Championship was the 4th edition of the CONCACAF Women's Olympic Qualifying Tournament, the quadrennial international football tournament organized by CONCACAF to determine which women's national teams from the North, Central American and Caribbean region qualify for the Olympic football tournament. CONCACAF announced on 12 August 2015 that the United States would host the tournament between 10–21 February 2016 in Houston and Frisco, Texas. A total of eight teams played in the tournament.

The top two teams of the tournament qualified for the 2016 Summer Olympics women's football tournament in Brazil as the CONCACAF representatives.

The United States won the tournament with a 2–0 final win over Canada. Both teams qualified for the Olympics, their sixth and third in a row respectively.

== Qualification ==
The eight berths were allocated to the three regional zones as follows:

- Three teams from the North American Zone (NAFU), i.e., Canada, Mexico and the hosts United States, who all qualified automatically due to being the only teams in the zone (Note: The other two NAFU members, the Bahamas and Bermuda, did not enter the qualifying tournament. Even if they had, CONCACAF statutes stipulate that they would have competed within the body's Caribbean Zone.)
- Two teams from the Central American Zone (UNCAF)
- Three teams from the Caribbean Zone (CFU)

Regional qualification tournaments were held to determine the five teams joining Canada, Mexico, and the United States at the final tournament.

=== Qualified teams ===
The following eight teams qualified for the final tournament.

Team	Qualification	Appearance	Previous best performances	Previous women's Olympic appearances
North American Zone (NAFU)
Canada	Automatic	4th	Runner-up (2008, 2012)	2
Mexico	Automatic	4th	Runner-up (2004)	1
United States	Automatic	4th	Winner (2004, 2008, 2012)	5
Central American Zone (UNCAF) qualified through Central American qualifying competition
Costa Rica	Group winner	4th	Fourth place (2004, 2008); Semi-finals (2012)	0
Guatemala	Group runner-up	2nd	Group stage (2012)	0
Caribbean Zone (CFU) qualified through Caribbean qualifying competition
Trinidad and Tobago	Final round winner	3rd	Group stage (2004, 2008)	0
Puerto Rico	Final round runner-up	1st	N/A	0
Guyana	Final round 3rd place	1st	N/A	0

== Venues ==
The two venues were announced by CONCACAF on 12 August 2015.

- BBVA Compass Stadium, Houston
- Toyota Stadium, Frisco

== Draw ==
The draw for the tournament took place on 23 November 2015 at 10:00 EST (UTC−5) at the InterContinental Doral in Doral, Florida. The draw was conducted by Cat Whitehill and Tiffany Roberts.

The eight teams were drawn into two groups of four teams. Tournament host, defending CONCACAF Olympic Qualifying Championship champion and 2012 Olympic gold medalist United States were seeded in Group A.

Pot 1	Pot 2	Pot 3
United States (Position A1); Canada; Mexico	Costa Rica; Guatemala	Guyana; Puerto Rico; Trinidad and Tobago

== Squads ==
Each team could register a maximum of 20 players (two of whom must be goalkeepers).

== Group stage ==
The top two teams of each group advanced to the semi-finals. The teams were ranked according to points (3 points for a win, 1 point for a draw, 0 points for a loss). If tied on points, tiebreakers would be applied in the following order:

1. Goal difference in all group matches;
2. Greatest number of goals scored in all group matches;
3. Greatest number of points obtained in the group matches between the teams concerned;
4. Goal difference resulting from the group matches between the teams concerned;
5. Greater number of goals scored in all group matches between the teams concerned;
6. Drawing of lots.

All times were local, CST (UTC−6).

=== Group A ===
Pos	Team	Pld	W	D	L	GF	GA	GD	Pts	Qualification
1	United States (H)	3	3	0	0	16	0	+16	9	Knockout stage
2	Costa Rica	3	2	0	1	11	6	+5	6	Knockout stage
3	Mexico	3	1	0	2	7	3	+4	3	
4	Puerto Rico	3	0	0	3	0	25	−25	0	

Source: CONCACAF
(H) Hosts
10 February 2016
17:00

Puerto Rico	0–6	Mexico
	Report	Domínguez 18', 51', 89' (pen.); Garciamendez 22'; Rangel 54'; Johnson 90+1'

Toyota Stadium, Frisco
Referee: Miriam León (El Salvador)
10 February 2016
19:30

United States	5–0	Costa Rica
Morgan 1', 62'; Lloyd 9' (pen.); Dunn 15'; Press 83'	Report

Toyota Stadium, Frisco
Attendance: 8,143
Referee: Cardella Samuels (Jamaica)

13 February 2016
12:30

Costa Rica	9–0	Puerto Rico
K. Villalobos 8', 57', 60'; R. Rodríguez 36', 75', 90+2'; Herrera 56'; Sáenz 65'; S. Cruz 84'	Report

Toyota Stadium, Frisco
Referee: Michelle Pye (Canada)
13 February 2016
15:00

Mexico	0–1	United States
	Report	Lloyd 80'

Toyota Stadium, Frisco
Attendance: 15,032
Referee: Melissa Borjas (Honduras)

15 February 2016
17:00

Mexico	1–2	Costa Rica
Domínguez 79'	Report	R. Rodríguez 10', 57' (pen.)

Toyota Stadium, Frisco
Referee: Carol Chenard (Canada)
15 February 2016
19:30

United States	10–0	Puerto Rico
Dunn 6', 21', 61', 85', 87'; Lloyd 19' (pen.); O'Hara 45'; Rivera 60' (o.g.); Press 62'; Mewis 90'	Report

Toyota Stadium, Frisco
Attendance: 7,658
Referee: Crystal Sobers (Trinidad and Tobago)

=== Group B ===
Pos	Team	Pld	W	D	L	GF	GA	GD	Pts	Qualification
1	Canada	3	3	0	0	21	0	+21	9	Knockout stage
2	Trinidad and Tobago	3	2	0	1	7	8	−1	6	Knockout stage
3	Guyana	3	1	0	2	3	11	−8	3	
4	Guatemala	3	0	0	3	2	14	−12	0	

Source: CONCACAF
11 February 2016
17:00

Guatemala	1–2	Trinidad and Tobago
Martínez 18' (pen.)	Report	Cordner 74'; St. Louis 78'

BBVA Compass Stadium, Houston
Referee: Margaret Domka (United States)
11 February 2016
19:30

Canada	5–0	Guyana
Rose 25', 40'; Lawrence 29', 46', 48'	Report

BBVA Compass Stadium, Houston
Attendance: 836
Referee: Marianela Araya (Costa Rica)

14 February 2016
12:30

Guyana	2–1	Guatemala
El-Masri 71'; Heydorn 76'	Report	Martínez 54'

BBVA Compass Stadium, Houston
Referee: Tatiana Guzman (Nicaragua)
14 February 2016
15:00

Trinidad and Tobago	0–6	Canada
	Report	Matheson 24'; Tancredi 44'; Sinclair 63'; Buchanan 66'; Beckie 75'; Fleming 79'

BBVA Compass Stadium, Houston
Attendance: 1,453
Referee: Quetzalli Alvarado (Mexico)

16 February 2016
17:00

Trinidad and Tobago	5–1	Guyana
Cordner 7', 61'; Shade 9'; Cunningham 16'; Mollon 21'	Report	Williams 43'

BBVA Compass Stadium, Houston
Referee: Gillian Martindale (Barbados)
16 February 2016
19:30

Canada	10–0	Guatemala
Tancredi 4', 85'; Carle 27'; Beckie 35'; Prince 43', 84', 88'; Quinn 45' (pen.), 49', 52'	Report

BBVA Compass Stadium, Houston
Attendance: 859
Referee: Lucila Venegas (Mexico)

== Knockout stage ==
In the knockout stage, extra time and penalty shoot-out would be used to decide the winner if necessary.

=== Bracket ===
Semi-finals
19 February – Houston
Canada	3
Costa Rica	1
19 February – Houston
United States	5
Trinidad and Tobago	0

Final
21 February – Houston
Canada	0
United States	2

=== Semi-finals ===
Winners qualified for 2016 Summer Olympics.

19 February 2016
16:30

Canada	3–1	Costa Rica
Sinclair 17', 52'; Rose 86'	Report	Rodríguez 73' (pen.)

BBVA Compass Stadium, Houston
Attendance: 5,516
Referee: Melissa Borjas (Honduras)

19 February 2016
19:30

United States	5–0	Trinidad and Tobago
Heath 12'; Morgan 30', 71', 73'; Lloyd 43'	Report

BBVA Compass Stadium, Houston
Attendance: 5,561
Referee: Tatiana Guzman (Nicaragua)

=== Final ===
21 February 2016
16:00

Canada	0–2	United States
	Report	Horan 53'; Heath 61'

BBVA Compass Stadium, Houston
Attendance: 10,119
Referee: Quetzalli Alvarado (Mexico)

== Final ranking ==
As per statistical convention in football, matches decided in extra time are counted as wins and losses, while matches decided by penalty shoot-outs are counted as draws.

Pos	Team	Pld	W	D	L	GF	GA	GD	Pts	Final result
1st place, gold medalist(s)	United States (H)	5	5	0	0	23	0	+23	15	Champions
2nd place, silver medalist(s)	Canada	5	4	0	1	24	3	+21	12	Runners-up
3	Costa Rica	4	2	0	2	12	9	+3	6	Eliminated in Semi-finals
4	Trinidad and Tobago	4	2	0	2	7	13	−6	6	Eliminated in Semi-finals
5	Mexico	3	1	0	2	7	3	+4	3	Eliminated in Group stage
6	Guyana	3	1	0	2	3	11	−8	3	Eliminated in Group stage
7	Guatemala	3	0	0	3	2	14	−12	0	Eliminated in Group stage
8	Puerto Rico	3	0	0	3	0	25	−25	0	Eliminated in Group stage

Source: CONCACAF
(H) Hosts

=== Qualified teams for Olympics ===
The following two teams from CONCACAF qualified for the Olympic football tournament.

Team	Qualified on	Previous appearances in tournament^{1}
United States	19 February 2016	5 (**1996**, 2000, **2004**, **2008**, **2012**)
Canada	19 February 2016	2 (2008, 2012)

^{1} Bold indicates champion for that year. Italic indicates host for that year.

== Goalscorers ==
6 goals

- (Costa Rica) Raquel Rodríguez
- (United States) Crystal Dunn

5 goals

- (United States) Alex Morgan

4 goals

- (Mexico) Maribel Domínguez
- (United States) Carli Lloyd

3 goals

- (Canada) Ashley Lawrence
- (Canada) Nichelle Prince
- (Canada) Quinn (Note: Then known as Rebecca Quinn)
- (Canada) Deanne Rose
- (Canada) Christine Sinclair
- (Canada) Melissa Tancredi
- (Costa Rica) Karla Villalobos
- (Trinidad and Tobago) Kennya Cordner

2 goals

- (Canada) Janine Beckie
- (Guatemala) Ana Martínez
- (United States) Tobin Heath
- (United States) Christen Press

1 goal

- (Canada) Kadeisha Buchanan
- (Canada) Gabrielle Carle
- (Canada) Jessie Fleming
- (Canada) Diana Matheson
- (Costa Rica) Shirley Cruz
- (Costa Rica) Melissa Herrera
- (Costa Rica) Diana Sáenz
- (Guyana) Mariam El-Masri
- (Guyana) Alison Heydorn
- (Guyana) Bria Williams
- (Mexico) Alina Garciamendez
- (Mexico) Katlyn Johnson
- (Mexico) Nayeli Rangel
- (Trinidad and Tobago) Jenelle Cunningham
- (Trinidad and Tobago) Ahkeela Mollon
- (Trinidad and Tobago) Mariah Shade
- (Trinidad and Tobago) Tasha St. Louis
- (United States) Lindsey Horan
- (United States) Kelley O'Hara
- (United States) Sam Mewis

Own goal

- (Puerto Rico) Ashley Rivera (playing against United States)

== Awards ==
The following awards were given at the conclusion of the tournament.

Best XI

- Goalkeeper: (United States) Hope Solo
- Right Defender: (United States) Kelley O'Hara
- Central Defender: (United States) Becky Sauerbrunn
- Central Defender: (Canada) Kadeisha Buchanan
- Left Defender: (Canada) Allysha Chapman
- Right Midfielder: (United States) Tobin Heath
- Central Midfielder: (United States) Lindsey Horan
- Central Midfielder: (United States) Morgan Brian
- Left Midfielder: (Canada) Ashley Lawrence
- Forward: (United States) Alex Morgan
- Forward: (United States) Carli Lloyd

Golden Ball

- (United States) Morgan Brian

Golden Boot

- (United States) Crystal Dunn (6 goals)

Golden Glove

- (United States) Hope Solo

Fair Play Award

- United States
