= Estadio Panamericano, San Cristóbal =

Football stadium in the Dominican Republic

Estadio Panamericano
- Interactive map of Estadio Panamericano
- Location: San Cristóbal, Dominican Republic
- Coordinates: 18°24′53″N 70°07′11″W
- Capacity: 2,800
- Surface: Grass

Construction
- Opened: 2003

Tenants
- San Cristóbal FC (until 2014); Atlético San Cristóbal (2015-); Dominican Republic men's national football team (selected matches)

Estadio Panamericano is a stadium located in San Cristóbal, Dominican Republic. It is currently used mostly for football matches. It is the home stadium of San Cristóbal, a football club which plays in the Dominican Republic First Division. The stadium also hosts some Dominican Republic national football team matches.
