= 2012 CONCACAF Women's Olympic Qualifying Tournament squads =

This article lists the squads for the 2012 CONCACAF Women's Olympic Qualifying Tournament, to be held in Canada. The 8 national teams involved in the tournament were required to register a squad of 20 players; only players in these squads were eligible to take part in the tournament.

Players marked (c) were named as captain for their national squad. Number of caps, players' club teams and players' age as of 19 January 2012 – the tournament's opening day.

== Group A ==
=== Canada ===
Coach: (England) John Herdman

No.	Pos.	Player	Date of birth (age)	Caps	Club
1	GK	Karina LeBlanc	30 March 1980 (aged 31)	90	(United States) Sky Blue FC
2	DF	Shannon Woeller	31 January 1990 (aged 21)	4	(United States) Rutgers University
3	MF	Melanie Booth	24 August 1983 (aged 28)	51	(Canada) Vancouver Whitecaps
4	MF	Carmelina Moscato	2 May 1984 (aged 27)	52	(Sweden) Piteå IF
5	DF	Robyn Gayle	31 October 1985 (aged 26)	47	(Canada) Vancouver Whitecaps
6	MF	Kaylyn Kyle	6 October 1988 (aged 23)	37	(Canada) Vancouver Whitecaps
7	DF	Rhian Wilkinson	12 May 1982 (aged 29)	105	(Canada) Surrey United Firefighters
8	MF	Alyscha Mottershead	25 May 1991 (aged 20)	37	(Canada) Toronto Lady Lynx
9	DF	Candace Chapman	2 April 1983 (aged 28)	91	(United States) Western New York Flash
10	FW	Christina Julien	6 May 1988 (aged 23)	32	(Canada) Ottawa Fury Women
11	MF	Desiree Scott	31 July 1987 (aged 24)	26	(Canada) Vancouver Whitecaps
12	FW	Christine Sinclair	12 June 1983 (aged 28)	169	(United States) Western New York Flash
13	MF	Sophie Schmidt	28 June 1988 (aged 23)	68	(United States) magicJack
14	FW	Melissa Tancredi	27 December 1981 (aged 30)	61	(Sweden) Piteå IF
15	MF	Kelly Parker	8 March 1981 (aged 30)	17	(United States) Atlanta Beat
16	DF	Lauren Sesselmann	14 August 1983 (aged 28)	2	(United States) Atlanta Beat
17	FW	Brittany Timko	5 September 1985 (aged 26)	103	Unattached
18	GK	Erin McLeod	26 February 1983 (aged 28)	62	(Sweden) Dalsjöfors GoIF
19	MF	Chelsea Stewart	28 April 1990 (aged 21)	50	(Canada) Vancouver Whitecaps
20	FW	Chelsea Buckland	20 January 1990 (aged 21)	0	(United States) Oregon State Beavers

=== Costa Rica ===
Coach: (Costa Rica) Karla Alemán

No.	Pos.	Player	Date of birth (age)	Caps	Club
1	GK	Julieth Arias	6 December 1990 (aged 21)		
2	FW	Saudy Rosales	13 October 1985 (aged 26)		
3	MF	Yendry Villalobos	27 May 1984 (aged 27)		
4	FW	María Barrantes	12 April 1989 (aged 22)		
5	DF	Diana Sáenz	15 April 1989 (aged 22)		
6	DF	Carol Sánchez	16 April 1986 (aged 25)		
7	MF	Mariela Campos	4 January 1991 (aged 21)		
8	DF	Daniela Cruz	8 March 1991 (aged 20)		
9	FW	Carolina Venegas	28 September 1991 (aged 20)		
10	MF	Shirley Cruz	28 August 1985 (aged 26)		(France) Lyon
11	FW	Raquel Rodríguez	28 October 1993 (aged 18)		
12	DF	Lixy Rodríguez	4 November 1990 (aged 21)		
14	MF	Marianne Ugalde	10 May 1990 (aged 21)		
15	MF	Cristín Granados	19 August 1989 (aged 22)		
16	MF	Katherine Alvarado	11 April 1991 (aged 20)		
17	MF	Adriana Venegas	12 June 1989 (aged 22)		
18	GK	Érika Miranda	2 December 1984 (aged 27)		
19	DF	Fabiola Sánchez	9 April 1993 (aged 18)		
20	DF	Wendy Acosta	19 December 1989 (aged 22)		

=== Cuba ===
Coach: (Cuba) José Luis Elejalde

No.	Pos.	Player	Date of birth (age)	Caps	Club
1	GK	Katherine Montesino	17 January 1992 (aged 20)		
2	DF	Sandra Enamorado	6 March 1984 (aged 27)		
3	DF	Yutmila Galindo	15 March 1978 (aged 33)		
4	DF	Sucel Maceo	21 March 1987 (aged 24)		
5	DF	Yoanis Linares	31 December 1975 (aged 36)		
6	MF	Jessica Pupo	12 September 1990 (aged 21)		
7	DF	Marianela Morales	1 July 1991 (aged 20)		
8	FW	Yezenia Gallardo*	28 June 1991 (aged 20)		
9	MF	Dayanay Baró	18 May 1986 (aged 25)		
10	FW	Yaremis Fuentes	30 January 1991 (aged 20)		
11	MF	Rachel Peláez	5 May 1993 (aged 18)		
12	GK	Lucylena Martínez	28 May 1991 (aged 20)		
13	MF	María Pérez	7 September 1992 (aged 19)		
14	MF	Yarisleidy Mena	17 February 1994 (aged 17)		
15	DF	Anay Bombú	21 October 1991 (aged 20)		
16	MF	Yisel Rodríguez*	30 January 1989 (aged 22)		
17	DF	Yunelsis Rodríguez	21 June 1977 (aged 34)		
18	DF	Indira Manzano	11 October 1993 (aged 18)		

- Defected

=== Haiti ===
Coach: (Haiti) Ronald Luxieux

No.	Pos.	Player	Date of birth (age)	Caps	Club
1	GK	Géralda Saintilus	10 December 1985 (aged 26)		
2	DF	Natacha Cajuste	24 February 1984 (aged 27)		
3	DF	Carmelia Aristilde	25 December 1986 (aged 25)		
4	DF	Kencia Marseille	8 November 1980 (aged 31)		
5	DF	Marie Lounie Valcine	2 November 1986 (aged 25)		
6	DF	Fiorda Charles	21 February 1987 (aged 24)		
7	MF	Lovely Placide	17 November 1988 (aged 23)		
8	MF	Darlene Beauciquot	11 September 1984 (aged 27)		
9	FW	Adeline Saintilmond	25 December 1984 (aged 27)		
10	MF	Wisline Dolce	22 November 1986 (aged 25)		
11	FW	Sophia Batard	8 March 1989 (aged 22)		
12	GK	Ednie Limage	15 May 1985 (aged 26)		
13	DF	Marie Eline Bellevue	18 March 1988 (aged 23)		
14	MF	Samantha Brand	16 June 1988 (aged 23)		(Sweden) IFK Gävle
15	FW	Kimberly Boulos	16 April 1987 (aged 24)		(Sweden) Bollstanäs SK
16	FW	Tatiana Mathelier	11 August 1983 (aged 28)		
17	MF	Roselord Borgella	1 April 1993 (aged 18)		
18	MF	Manoucheka Pierre Louis	24 June 1989 (aged 22)		
19	MF	Nadia Valentin	10 April 1997 (aged 14)		
20	FW	Marie Soline Bellevue	18 March 1988 (aged 23)		

== Group B ==
=== Dominican Republic ===
Coach: (Cuba) Rufino Sotolongo

No.	Pos.	Player	Date of birth (age)	Caps	Club
1	GK	Isairis Minaya	27 October 1992 (aged 19)	1	
2	DF	Carmen Polanco	19 May 1993 (aged 18)	1	
3	DF	Denny Vargas	12 August 1990 (aged 21)	5	
4	DF	Lissy Sánchez	5 December 1995 (aged 16)	5	
5	DF	Ana Odaliza Díaz	27 July 1985 (aged 26)	1	
6	MF	Yesenia López	9 December 1984 (aged 27)	5	
7	MF	Loida Michel	12 August 1993 (aged 18)	3	
8	MF	Diana Santana	17 October 1994 (aged 17)	4	
9	FW	Anajaira Claudio	24 August 1996 (aged 15)	0	
10	FW	Yaqueisi Núñez	19 April 1994 (aged 17)	3	
11	FW	Betzaida Ubrí	9 May 1990 (aged 21)	5	
12	GK	Heidy Salazar	25 August 1985 (aged 26)	4	
13	MF	Leonela Mojica	28 August 1987 (aged 24)	5	
14	DF	Amanda Rodríguez	4 November 1994 (aged 17)	0	
15	MF	Jocelyn Rodriguez	30 May 1984 (aged 27)	2	
16	MF	Katherine Rodríguez	5 August 1990 (aged 21)	0	
17	MF	Elizabeth Martínez	3 October 1989 (aged 22)	5	
18	MF	Olysabel Santana	17 November 1986 (aged 25)	5	
19	MF	Gabriela Peña	23 August 1995 (aged 16)	0	
20	MF	Brenda Frías	19 June 1988 (aged 23)	5	

=== Guatemala ===
Coach: (Guatemala) Raúl Calderón

No.	Pos.	Player	Date of birth (age)	Caps	Goals	Club
1	GK	Maricruz Lemus	2 May 1990 (aged 21)	5	0	(National Football Federation of Guatemala) Jutiapanecas
2	DF	Jeymi Piedad Hernández	2 December 1993 (aged 18)	1	0	(National Football Federation of Guatemala) Muniguate
3	DF	Marilyn Rivera	19 February 1992 (aged 19)	10	0	(National Football Federation of Guatemala) Unifut
4	DF	Shannon Brooks	24 June 1991 (aged 20)	3	0	(United States Soccer Federation) N. Dakota State U.
5	MF	Londy Barrios	8 April 1992 (aged 19)	11	0	(National Football Federation of Guatemala) Unifut
6	DF	Gloria Lohaiza	22 April 1987 (aged 24)	14	1	(National Football Federation of Guatemala) Profutbol
7	FW	Wendy Pineda	9 July 1989 (aged 22)	16	6	(National Football Federation of Guatemala) Champions
8	DF	María Monterroso	30 November 1993 (aged 18)	12	3	(National Football Federation of Guatemala) Unifut
9	MF	Cinthya López	23 August 1993 (aged 18)	12	0	(National Football Federation of Guatemala) Unifut
10	MF	Gladys Suriano	26 December 1985 (aged 26)	20	4	Unattached
11	MF	Rocío Sosa	24 August 1990 (aged 21)	12	2	(National Football Federation of Guatemala) Unifut
12	GK	Mariandre Rodas	14 April 1995 (aged 16)	0	0	(National Football Federation of Guatemala) Profutbol
13	FW	Celeste Pelayes	26 December 1983 (aged 28)	0	0	(National Football Federation of Guatemala) Profutbol
14	DF	Coralia Monterroso	26 December 1991 (aged 20)	7	1	(National Football Federation of Guatemala) Unifut
15	MF	Kimberly de León	29 August 1989 (aged 22)	9	1	(National Football Federation of Guatemala) Champions
16	MF	Alejandra de León	19 August 1983 (aged 28)	9	4	(National Football Federation of Guatemala) Profutbol
17	MF	Ana Martínez	8 January 1990 (aged 22)	13	3	(National Football Federation of Guatemala) Unifut
18	DF	Idania Pérez	3 June 1992 (aged 19)	6	4	(National Football Federation of Guatemala) Jutiapanecas
19	MF	Andrea Tobar	8 July 1988 (aged 23)	6	2	(National Football Federation of Guatemala) Chinautla
20	FW	Katherine Ramos	28 October 1991 (aged 20)	14	4	(National Football Federation of Guatemala) Unifut

=== Mexico ===
Coach: (Mexico) Leonardo Cuéllar

No.	Pos.	Player	Date of birth (age)	Caps	Club
1	GK	Cecilia Santiago	19 October 1994 (aged 17)	16	(Mexico) Club Santos Laguna
2	DF	Arianna Romero	29 July 1992 (aged 19)		
3	DF	Rubí Sandoval	18 January 1984 (aged 28)	70	
4	DF	Alina Garciamendez	16 April 1991 (aged 20)	17	(United States) Stanford University
5	DF	Bianca Sierra	25 June 1992 (aged 19)		(United States) Auburn University
6	DF	Natalie Garcia	30 January 1990 (aged 21)	3	(United States) University of San Diego
7	MF	Teresa Noyola	15 April 1990 (aged 21)	7	(United States) Stanford University
8	MF	Marylin Díaz	18 November 1991 (aged 20)		
9	FW	Maribel Domínguez	18 November 1978 (aged 33)	96	(Spain) UE L'Estartit
10	MF	Dinora Garza	24 January 1988 (aged 23)	30	(Mexico) Tigres de la UANL
11	FW	Mónica Ocampo	4 January 1987 (aged 25)	37	
12	GK	Anjulí Ladrón de Guevara	7 October 1986 (aged 25)		
13	DF	Jennifer Ruiz	9 August 1983 (aged 28)		
14	FW	Renae Cuéllar	24 June 1990 (aged 21)		(United States) University of Arizona
15	DF	Luz Saucedo	14 December 1983 (aged 28)		
16	FW	Anisa Guajardo	10 March 1991 (aged 20)		(United States) Pali Blues
17	MF	Verónica Pérez	18 May 1988 (aged 23)	23	(United States) Saint Louis Athletica
18	DF	Christina Murillo	28 January 1993 (aged 18)		
19	DF	Mónica Alvarado	11 January 1991 (aged 21)	5	(United States) Texas Christian University
20	FW	Chrystal Martínez	12 October 1996 (aged 15)		

=== United States ===
Coach: (Sweden) Pia Sundhage

No.	Pos.	Player	Date of birth (age)	Caps	Goals	Club
1	GK	Hope Solo	30 July 1981 (aged 30)	104	0	Unattached
2	DF	Heather Mitts	9 June 1978 (aged 33)	119	2	Unattached
3	DF	Christie Rampone (c)	24 June 1975 (aged 36)	245	4	Unattached
4	DF	Becky Sauerbrunn	6 June 1985 (aged 26)	15	0	(United States Soccer Federation) Sky Blue FC
5	DF	Kelley O'Hara	4 August 1988 (aged 23)	7	0	(United States Soccer Federation) Atlanta Beat
6	DF	Amy LePeilbet	12 March 1982 (aged 29)	57	0	(United States Soccer Federation) Atlanta Beat
7	MF	Shannon Boxx	29 June 1977 (aged 34)	154	22	Unattached
8	MF	Amy Rodriguez	17 February 1987 (aged 24)	74	22	Unattached
9	MF	Heather O'Reilly	2 January 1985 (aged 27)	153	33	(United States Soccer Federation) Sky Blue FC
10	MF	Carli Lloyd	16 July 1982 (aged 29)	120	29	(United States Soccer Federation) Atlanta Beat
11	DF	Ali Krieger	28 July 1984 (aged 27)	27	0	(German Football Association) 1. FFC Frankfurt
12	FW	Lauren Cheney	30 September 1987 (aged 24)	52	17	Unattached
13	FW	Alex Morgan	2 July 1989 (aged 22)	28	10	(United States Soccer Federation) Western New York Flash
14	FW	Sydney Leroux	7 May 1990 (aged 21)	1	0	(United States Soccer Federation) Atlanta Beat
15	MF	Megan Rapinoe	5 July 1985 (aged 26)	39	11	Unattached
16	MF	Lori Lindsey	19 March 1980 (aged 31)	24	0	(United States Soccer Federation) Western New York Flash
17	MF	Tobin Heath	29 May 1988 (aged 23)	35	4	Unattached
18	GK	Nicole Barnhart	10 October 1981 (aged 30)	41	0	Unattached
19	DF	Rachel Buehler	26 August 1985 (aged 26)	68	3	(United States Soccer Federation) Atlanta Beat
20	FW	Abby Wambach	2 June 1980 (aged 31)	167	125	Unattached
