= Dominican Republic women's national football team results =

the Dominican Republic women's national football team is the representative of the Dominican Republic in international women's association football, It is governed by the Dominican Football Federation (Federación Dominicana de Fútbol) and it competes as a member of the Confederation of North, Central America, and Caribbean Association Football (CONCACAF).

The national team's first appearance was in the CFU Qualifying for the 2002 CONCACAF Women's Gold Cup entering the first round the team was drawn against Haiti, Saint Lucia and the Bahamas. they settled for a draw in the opening match against Saint Lucia, later on, the group saw the Dominican Republic beat the Bahamas three to nil and lose their final game against Haiti.

In 2007, during the 2008 CONCACAF Women's Olympic Qualifying Tournament qualification The Dominican Republic opened Group D of the Digicel Cup and in so doing re-wrote the history books as they annihilated the British Virgin Islands by a scoreline never before seen in the entire CONCACAF region for international football. The margin of 17 clear goals, while keeping a clean sheet, is unrivaled in football in the history of the game across the CONCACAF region in all international competitions.

As of 13 October 2022, the Dominican Republic's team is ranked 109th worldwide, and 13th in the CONCACAF region. they are yet to mark their debut in big-stage competitions.

== Record per opponent ==
Key

Positive balance (more wins than losses)
Neutral balance (as many wins as losses)
Negative balance (more losses than wins)

The following table shows Dominican Republic' all-time official international record per opponent:

Opponent	Pld	W	D	L	GF	GA	GD	W%	Confederation
Anguilla	1	1	0	0	3	0	+3	100.00	CONCACAF
Antigua and Barbuda	1	1	0	0	2	0	+2	100.00	CONCACAF
Aruba	2	2	0	0	5	0	+5	100.00	CONCACAF
Bahamas	1	1	0	0	3	0	+3	100.00	CONCACAF
Bermuda	3	3	0	0	5	1	+4	100.00	CONCACAF
Bolivia	2	1	1	0	4	1	+3	50.00	CONMEBOL
British Virgin Islands	1	1	0	0	17	0	+17	100.00	CONCACAF
Cayman Islands	1	1	0	0	4	0	+4	100.00	CONCACAF
Costa Rica	1	0	0	1	1	6	-5	00.00	CONCACAF
Cuba	7	1	2	4	5	13	-8	14.29	CONCACAF
Dominica	2	2	0	0	14	0	+14	100.00	CONCACAF
Grenada	1	1	0	0	9	0	+9	100.00	CONCACAF
Guatemala	1	0	0	1	0	6	-6	00.00	CONCACAF
Haiti	5	0	0	5	3	19	-16	00.00	CONCACAF
Jamaica	3	0	0	3	1	18	-17	00.00	CONCACAF
Mexico	1	0	0	1	0	7	-7	00.00	CONCACAF
Nicaragua	2	0	0	2	0	2	-2	00.00	CONCACAF
Panama	1	0	0	1	0	5	-5	00.00	CONCACAF
Puerto Rico	3	0	2	1	1	3	-2	00.00	CONCACAF
Saint Kitts and Nevis	1	0	1	0	0	0	0	00.00	CONCACAF
Saint Lucia	2	1	1	0	9	2	+7	50.00	CONCACAF
Suriname	1	1	0	0	2	0	+2	100.00	CONCACAF
Trinidad and Tobago	5	2	2	1	4	9	-5	40.00	CONCACAF
Turks and Caicos Islands	2	2	0	0	8	1	+7	100.00	CONCACAF
U.S. Virgin Islands	2	2	0	0	7	1	+6	100.00	CONCACAF
United States	1	0	0	1	0	14	-14	00.00	CONCACAF
Venezuela	1	0	0	1	2	6	-4	00.00	CONMEBOL
Total	54	23	9	22	109	114	-5	42.59	—

== Results ==
=== 2002 ===
10 July 2002 CONCACAF Women's Gold Cup Qualifying Group 2	Dominican Republic	2–2	Saint Lucia	Port-au-Prince, Haiti
--:-- UTC−5

12 July 2002 CONCACAF Women's Gold Cup Qualifying Group 2	Dominican Republic	3–0	Bahamas	Port-au-Prince, Haiti
--:-- UTC−5

14 July 2002 CONCACAF Women's Gold Cup Qualifying Group 2	Haiti	2–0	Dominican Republic	Port-au-Prince, Haiti
--:-- UTC−5

=== 2003 ===
31 October 2004 CONCACAF Women's Pre-Olympic Tournament qualification Qualifying 1st leg	Dominican Republic	0–7	Haiti	San Cristóbal, Dominican Republic
--:-- UTC−4		Report	Badio 1', 20'; Pierre 27', 87'; Bien-Aimé 42'; Marcellus 45'; Lundy 89'	Stadium: Estadio Panamericano; Attendance: 100; Referee: Esther Páez Álvarez (Cuba)

2 November 2004 CONCACAF Women's Pre-Olympic Tournament qualification Qualifying 2nd leg	Haiti	3–2 (10–2 agg.)	Dominican Republic	San Cristóbal, Dominican Republic
--:-- UTC−4	Pierre 21'; Hilaire 55'; Ridore 88'	Report	Joseph 33'; J. Rodríguez 39'	Stadium: Estadio Panamericano; Attendance: 1,000; Referee: Cassie Moore (Trinidad and Tobago)
Note: Haiti won 10–2 on aggregate.

=== 2006 ===
4 May 2006 CONCACAF Women's Gold Cup Qualifying Group A	Dominican Republic	3–1	U.S. Virgin Islands	San Cristóbal, Dominican Republic
--:-- UTC−4

6 May 2006 CONCACAF Women's Gold Cup Qualifying Group A	Dominican Republic	5–0	Turks and Caicos Islands	San Cristóbal, Dominican Republic
--:-- UTC−4

8 May 2006 CONCACAF Women's Gold Cup Qualifying Group A	Dominican Republic	3–1	Bermuda	San Cristóbal, Dominican Republic
--:-- UTC−4

6 September 2006 CONCACAF Women's Gold Cup Qualifying Group A	Suriname	0–2	Dominican Republic	Port of Spain, Trinidad and Tobago
19:00 UTC−4		Report	Jiménez 76'; Valerio 90'	Stadium: Hasely Crawford Stadium

10 September 2006 CONCACAF Women's Gold Cup Qualifying Group A	Dominican Republic	0–7	Trinidad and Tobago	Arima, Trinidad and Tobago
18:00 UTC−4		Report	St. Louis 10', 53' (pen.), 57' (pen.); James 13'; Mascall 45'; Russell 68'; Cordner 71'	Stadium: Larry Gomes Stadium

=== 2007 ===
3 October 2008 CONCACAF Women's Olympic Qualifying Tournament qualification Group 2	Dominican Republic	4–0	U.S. Virgin Islands	Santo Domingo Este, Dominican Republic
--:-- UTC−4	Astacio 16'; Martínez 37', 53'; Fernández 76'			Stadium: Estadio Parque del Este; Attendance: 100; Referee: Davio Edren (Haiti)

5 October 2008 CONCACAF Women's Olympic Qualifying Tournament qualification Group 2	Dominican Republic	17–0	British Virgin Islands	Santo Domingo Este, Dominican Republic
--:-- UTC−4	Martínez 16', 25', 60'; Santana 18', 63', 79'; Peralta 19', 27', 56'; Frías 30', 80', 83', 90'; Astacio 35', 41'; Rodríguez 69', 90'			Stadium: Estadio Parque del Este; Attendance: 250; Referee: Davio Edren (Haiti)

7 October 2008 CONCACAF Women's Olympic Qualifying Tournament qualification Group 2	Dominican Republic	1–2	Cuba	Santo Domingo Este, Dominican Republic
--:-- UTC−4	Osana 35'		Gallardo 53', 90+1'	Stadium: Estadio Parque del Este; Referee: Varnette Laing (Bahamas)

=== 2010 ===
26 March 2010 CONCACAF Women's World Cup Qualifying qualification Group D	Dominican Republic	3–1	Turks and Caicos Islands	Santo Domingo, Dominican Republic
18:00 UTC−4	Ubrí 29', 55'; Frías 75'	Report (CONCACAF)	Barnett 1'	Stadium: Estadio Panamericano San Cristóbal; Attendance: 650; Referee: Cardella Samuels (Jamaica)

30 March 2010 CONCACAF Women's World Cup Qualifying qualification Group D	Dominican Republic	1–2	Haiti	Santo Domingo, Dominican Republic
18:00 UTC−4	Díaz 42' (pen.)	Report (CONCACAF)	Saintilmond 28'; Dolce 84'	Stadium: Estadio Panamericano San Cristóbal; Attendance: 800; Referee: Cardella Samuels (Jamaica)

=== 2011 ===
26 June Friendly	Dominican Republic	0–5	Haiti	San Cristóbal, Dominican Republic
--:-- UTC−4				Stadium: Estadio Panamericano

5 July 2012 CONCACAF Women's Olympic Qualifying Tournament qualification Group B	Dominican Republic	3–0	Dominica	San Cristóbal, Dominican Republic
16:00 UTC−4	Martínez 25'; Núñez 44'; Frías 70'	Report (CONCACAF)		Stadium: Estadio Panamericano; Attendance: 805; Referee: Deborah Zebeda (Suriname)

7 July 2012 CONCACAF Women's Olympic Qualifying Tournament qualification Group B	Dominican Republic	1–0	Bermuda	San Cristóbal, Dominican Republic
16:00 UTC−4	Ubri 54'	Report (CONCACAF)		Stadium: Estadio Panamericano; Attendance: 600; Referee: Irazema Aguillera (Cuba)

9 July 2012 CONCACAF Women's Olympic Qualifying Tournament qualification Group B	Dominican Republic	1–0	Trinidad and Tobago	San Cristóbal, Dominican Republic
16:00 UTC−4	Ubri 51'	Report (CONCACAF)		Stadium: Estadio Panamericano; Attendance: 875; Referee: Cardella Samuels (Jamaica)

=== 2012 ===
14 January Friendly	Cuba	4–1	Dominican Republic	Havana, Cuba
--:-- UTC−5

16 January Friendly	Cuba	1–0	Dominican Republic	Havana, Cuba
--:-- UTC−5

20 January 2012 CONCACAF Women's Olympic Qualifying Tournament Group B	Dominican Republic	0–14	United States	Vancouver, Canada
19:30 UTC−8		Report (CONCACAF)	Wambach 1', 19'; Lloyd 4'; Buehler 7'; O'Reilly 17', 32', 78'; Heath 30'; Rodriguez 46', 48', 58', 70', 75'; Cheney 64'	Stadium: BC Place; Attendance: 6,321; Referee: Cardella Samuels (Jamaica)

22 January 2012 CONCACAF Women's Olympic Qualifying Tournament Group B	Mexico	7–0	Dominican Republic	Vancouver, Canada
14:00 UTC−8	Saucedo 21'; Díaz 27'; Ruiz 38', 71'; Guajardo 49', 62', 75'	Report (CONCACAF)		Stadium: BC Place; Attendance: 1,500; Referee: Maria Flores (Costa Rica)

24 January 2012 CONCACAF Women's Olympic Qualifying Tournament Group B	Guatemala	6–0	Dominican Republic	Vancouver, Canada
17:00 UTC−8	Pineda 2', 5', 29'; Monterroso 9', 90+1'; Martínez 53'	Report (CONCACAF)		Stadium: BC Place; Attendance: 2,000; Referee: Cardella Samuels (Jamaica)

=== 2014 ===
18 June 2014 CFU Women's Caribbean Cup Qualifying Group 5	Dominican Republic	7–0	Saint Lucia	San Cristóbal, Dominican Republic
16:00 UTC−4	Ubri 24', 62'; Núñez 26', 54', 84', 90+2'; Peña 47'	Report (CONCACAF)		Stadium: Estadio Panamericano

22 June 2014 CFU Women's Caribbean Cup Qualifying Group 5	Dominican Republic	0–7	Jamaica	San Cristóbal, Dominican Republic
16:00 UTC−4		Report (CONCACAF)	Duncan 3', 23', 64', 77'; Davis 31', 90+1'; Henry 42'	Stadium: Estadio Panamericano

11 November Friendly	Cuba	0–1	Dominican Republic	Havana, Cuba
--:-- UTC−5

13 November Friendly	Cuba	1–1	Dominican Republic	Havana, Cuba
--:-- UTC−5

18 November 2014 Central American and Caribbean Games	Dominican Republic	0–1	Nicaragua	Cuautitlán Izcalli, Mexico
10:00 UTC−7		Report	Solís 30'	Stadium: Estadio Hugo Sánchez Márquez; Referee: Maurees Urane Skeete (Guyana)

20 November 2014 Central American and Caribbean Games	Venezuela	6–2	Dominican Republic	Cuautitlán Izcalli, Mexico
10:00 UTC−7	Garcia 10', 82'; Cañas 18'; Basanta 52'; Marcano 56'; Vargas 90+5' (o.g.)	Report	Y. Núñez 45+1'; Ubri 68'	Stadium: Estadio Hugo Sánchez Márquez; Referee: Tatiana Guzmán (Nicaragua)

22 November 2014 Central American and Caribbean Games	Dominican Republic	1–6	Costa Rica	Cuautitlán Izcalli, Mexico
15:00 UTC−7	Ubri 70'	Report	Sánchez 14' (pen.); Barrantes 33'; K. Villalobos 39', 61', 90'; Y. Rodríguez 53'	Stadium: Estadio Hugo Sánchez Márquez; Referee: Maurees Urane Skeete (Guyana)

=== 2015 ===
18 August Friendly	Dominican Republic	0–0	Cuba	San Cristóbal, Dominican Republic
--:-- UTC−4				Stadium: Estadio Panamericano

21 August 2016 CONCACAF Women's Olympic Qualifying Championship qualification	Dominican Republic	11–0	Dominica	San Cristóbal, Dominican Republic
16:30 UTC−4	Núñez 7', 74'; Xavier 18' (o.g.); Peralta 28', 57'; Ubri 32', 40', 53', 53'; Pérez 65', 73'	Report (CFU)		Stadium: Estadio Panamericano

23 August 2016 CONCACAF Women's Olympic Qualifying Championship qualification	Dominican Republic	0–6	Jamaica	San Cristóbal, Dominican Republic
16:30 UTC−4		Report (CFU)	Shaw 22', 64'; Reid 32', 69'; Vincent 78'; Foster 80'	Stadium: Estadio Panamericano

=== 2018 ===
5 May 2018 CONCACAF Women's Championship Qualifying	Dominican Republic	1–5	Cuba	San Cristóbal, Dominican Republic
16:30 UTC−4	Oviedo 15'	Report (FDF); Report (CONCACAF)	Peláez 10', 63'; L. Pérez 19'; M. Pérez 36'; Mengana 73'	Stadium: Estadio Panamericano

7 May 2018 CONCACAF Women's Championship Qualifying	Puerto Rico	0–0	Dominican Republic	San Cristóbal, Dominican Republic
16:30 UTC−4		Report (FDF)		Stadium: Estadio Panamericano

11 May 2018 CONCACAF Women's Championship Qualifying	Dominican Republic	3–0	Anguilla	San Cristóbal, Dominican Republic
16:30 UTC−4	Oviedo 1', 60'; Romney 50' (o.g.)	Report (FDF); Report (CONCACAF)		Stadium: Estadio Panamericano

13 May 2018 CONCACAF Women's Championship Qualifying	Aruba	0–3	Dominican Republic	San Cristóbal, Dominican Republic
16:30 UTC−4		Report (FDF); Report (CONCACAF)	Vargas 4' (pen.), 36' (pen.); Rivas 45'	Stadium: Estadio Panamericano

=== 2019 ===
30 September 2020 CONCACAF Women's Olympic Qualifying Championship qualification	Dominican Republic	0–0	Saint Kitts and Nevis	Couva, Trinidad and Tobago
14:30 UTC−4		Report		Stadium: Ato Boldon Stadium

2 October 2020 CONCACAF Women's Olympic Qualifying Championship qualification	Dominican Republic	2–0	Aruba	Couva, Trinidad and Tobago
14:30 UTC−4	Balbuena 8', 69'	Report		Stadium: Ato Boldon Stadium

4 October 2020 CONCACAF Women's Olympic Qualifying Championship qualification	Antigua and Barbuda	0–2	Dominican Republic	Couva, Trinidad and Tobago
14:30 UTC−4		Report	Balbuena 68' (pen.); J. Oviedo 74'	Stadium: Ato Boldon Stadium

8 October 2020 CONCACAF Women's Olympic Qualifying Championship qualification	Trinidad and Tobago	0–0	Dominican Republic	Couva, Trinidad and Tobago
17:00 UTC−4		Report		Stadium: Ato Boldon Stadium

=== 2021 ===
19 February Friendly	Dominican Republic	1–1	Puerto Rico	Santo Domingo, Dominican Republic
--:-- UTC−4	Asenjo 68'	Report	Vázquez 19' (pen.)	Stadium: Estadio Olímpico Félix Sánchez; Referee: Ronide Henrius (Haiti)

21 February Friendly	Dominican Republic	0–2	Puerto Rico	Santo Domingo, Dominican Republic
--:-- UTC−4		Report	Suárez 37' (pen.); Vázquez 90+4'	Stadium: Estadio Olímpico Félix Sánchez; Referee: Randy Encarnación (Dominican Republic)

7 July Friendly	Nicaragua	1–0	Dominican Republic	Panama City, Panama
--:-- UTC−5		Report		Stadium: Estadio Nacional de Panamá

10 July Friendly	Panama	5–0	Dominican Republic	Panama City, Panama
--:-- UTC−5		Report		Stadium: Estadio Nacional de Panamá; Referee: Oliver Vergara (Panama)

22 October Friendly	Dominican Republic	3–0	Bolivia	Santiago de los Caballeros, Dominican Republic
--:-- UTC−4	Kara 28', 43'; Vargas 88'	Report		Stadium: Estadio Cibao; Attendance: 301; Referee: Randy Encarnación (Dominican Republic)

25 October Friendly	Dominican Republic	1–1	Bolivia	Santo Domingo, Dominican Republic
--:-- UTC−4	Cuevas 16'	Report	Segovia 67'	Stadium: Estadio Olímpico Félix Sánchez; Referee: Randy Encarnación (Dominican Republic)

26 November Friendly	Dominican Republic	2–1	Trinidad and Tobago	San Cristóbal, Dominican Republic
--:-- UTC−4	Kara 55'; Lareo 90+3'	Report	James 56' (pen.)	Stadium: Estadio Panamericano; Referee: Randy Encarnación (Dominican Republic)

30 November Friendly	Dominican Republic	1–1	Trinidad and Tobago	San Cristóbal, Dominican Republic
--:-- UTC−4	Oviedo 47'	Report	Belgrave 23'	Stadium: Estadio Panamericano; Referee: Ada Tolentino (Dominican Republic)

=== 2022 ===
16 February 2022 CONCACAF W Championship Qualifying Group C	Dominican Republic	9–0	Grenada	Santo Domingo, Dominican Republic
18:00 UTC−4	Oviedo 4', 12', 52'; Heyaime 6'; Lareo 9', 68'; Kara 49'; Santa 81'; Vargas 86'	Report (FIFA); Report (CONCACAF)		Stadium: Estadio Olímpico Félix Sánchez; Referee: Tatiana Guzmán (Nicaragua)

19 February 2022 CONCACAF W Championship Qualifying Group C	Cayman Islands	0–4	Dominican Republic	George Town, Cayman Islands
18:00 UTC−5		Report (FIFA); Report (CONCACAF)	Lareo 21' (pen.); Oviedo 40'; Santa 66'; Dionicio 74'	Stadium: Truman Bodden Sports Complex; Referee: Crystal Sobers (Trinidad and Tobago)

8 April 2022 CONCACAF W Championship Qualifying Group C	Dominican Republic	1–0	Bermuda	Santo Domingo, Dominican Republic
19:00 UTC−4	Kara 87'	Report (FIFA); Report (CONCACAF)		Stadium: Estadio Olímpico Félix Sánchez; Referee: Smeedly Saint-Jean (Haiti)

14 April 2022 CONCACAF W Championship Qualifying Group C	Jamaica	5–1	Dominican Republic	Kingston, Jamaica
18:00 UTC−5	Brown 16'; Carter 40'; Cameron 60'; Shaw 79', 90+3'	Report (FIFA); Report (CONCACAF)	González 24'	Stadium: Sabina Park Stadium; Referee: Tatiana Guzmán (Nicaragua)

=== 2023 ===
6 April Friendly	Panama	1–0	Dominican Republic	Panama City, Panama
20:00 UTC−5	Jaén 67'	Report		Stadium: Estadio Rommel Fernández

9 April Friendly	Panama	4–3	Dominican Republic	Panama City, Panama
	Cox 10'; Cedeno 57'; Hernández 88'; Riley 90+2'		Kara 12'; Asenjo 65', 80'	Stadium: Estadio Rommel Fernández

13 July Friendly	Puerto Rico	1–1	Dominican Republic	Mayagüez, Puerto Rico
19:00 UTC−4	Rodríguez 90+1'	Report	Marte 55'	Stadium: Mayagüez Athletics Stadium

16 July Friendly	Puerto Rico	0–0	Dominican Republic	TBC, Puerto Rico
--:-- UTC−4

22 September 2023 CONCACAF W Gold Cup qualification League B	Bermuda	2–0	Dominican Republic	Devonshire Parish
17:00; 17:00 (UTC−3)	Masters 10', 45+1'	Report		Stadium: National Sports Centre; Referee: Karen Hernandez (Mexico)

26 September 2023 CONCACAF W Gold Cup qualification League B	Dominican Republic	3–0	Barbados	Santo Domingo
19:00; 19:00 (UTC−4)	Torreira 39'; Reed 53'; Kara 55'	Report		Stadium: Estadio Olímpico Félix Sánchez; Referee: Odette Hamilton (Jamaica)

27 October 2023 CONCACAF W Gold Cup qualification League B	Saint Vincent and the Grenadines	0–8	Dominican Republic	Kingstown
15:00; 15:00 (UTC−4)		Report	Kara 1'; Jackson 9', 40', 58'; González 17', 33'; Peralta 23' (pen.); Cabrera 87'	Stadium: Arnos Vale Stadium; Referee: Kedeen Foster (Cayman Islands)

31 October 2023 CONCACAF W Gold Cup qualification League B	Dominican Republic	4–0	Saint Vincent and the Grenadines	Santo Domingo
	Jackson 2'; Marte 18'; Vallecillo 40'; Cuevas 60'	Report		Stadium: Estadio Olímpico Félix Sánchez; Referee: Suleimy Linares Sáez (Cuba)

1 December 2023 CONCACAF W Gold Cup qualification League B	Barbados	1–7	Dominican Republic

5 December 2023 CONCACAF W Gold Cup qualification League B	Dominican Republic	2–0	Bermuda

=== 2024 ===
17 February 2024 2024 CONCACAF W Gold Cup qualification	Guyana	0–1	Dominican Republic	Carson, United States
				Stadium: Dignity Health Sports Park

20 February CONCACAF W Gold Cup GS	United States	5–0	Dominican Republic	Carson, United States
22:15 (19:15 UTC−8)	Moultrie 7', 58'; Williams 30'; Nighswonger 86' (pen.); Morgan 90+2' (pen.)	Report		Stadium: Dignity Health Sports Park; Attendance: 3,242; Referee: Astrid Gramajo (Guatemala)

23 February CONCACAF W Gold Cup GS	Dominican Republic	0–8	Mexico	Carson, United States
19:30 (16:30 UTC−8)		Report	Hernández 12'; Ovalle 14', 27' (pen.); Luna 21'; Bernal 44'; Ordóñez 45+4'; Casarez 70'; Pelayo 90+3'	Stadium: Dignity Health Sports Park

26 February CONCACAF W Gold Cup GS	Argentina	3–0	Dominican Republic	Carson, United States
19:00 (16:00 UTC−8)	Ippólito 30'; Dos Santos 76'; Pereyra 90+4'	Report		Stadium: Dignity Health Sports Park

=== 2025 ===
29 May 2025 Friendly	Honduras	2-4	Dominican Republic	Comayagua, Honduras
15:00 UTC−6	Puerto 16'; Murillo 61'		Diemen 11'; González 31'; Jackson 69'; Slump 76'	Stadium: Estadio Carlos Miranda

1 June 2025 Friendly	Honduras	1-0	Dominican Republic	Comayagua, Honduras
15:00 UTC−6	Puerto 4'			Stadium: Estadio Carlos Miranda

2 December 2025 CONCACAF W Championship qualification	Dominican Republic	2-2	Suriname	Moca, Dominican Republic
	Asenjo 16', 85'	Report (FIFA); Report (CONCACAF)	Hoekstra 3'; Dompig 5'	Stadium: Estadio Complejo Deportivo Moca 86; Referee: Lizzet García (Mexico)

== See also ==
- Dominican Republic national football team results
- Football in the Dominican Republic
