= Football at the 2011 Pan American Games – Women's team squads =

This article displays the squads that participated at the football tournament at the 2011 Pan American Games in Guadalajara.

== Group A ==
=== Chile ===
- Yanara Aedo, FW 05/08/1993 Colo Colo (Chile)
- Yorky Arriagada, MF 31/05/1993 Santiago Morning (Chile)
- Natalia Campos, GK 12/01/1992 Universidad Catolica (Chile)
- Nicole Cornejo, DF 19/06/1993 Universidad de Chile (Chile)
- Claudia Endler (Germany), GK 23/07/1991 Colo Colo (Chile)
- Daniela Fuenzalida, MF/FW 16/12/1990 Saskatchewan Huskies (Canada)
- Su Helen Galaz, DF 27/05/1991 Everton Viña del Mar (Chile)
- Javiera Guajardo, DF 26/09/1989 Universidad de Chile (Chile)
- Carla Guerrero, DF/MF 23/12/1987 Colo Colo (Chile)
- Yessenia Huenteo FW 30/10/1996 Audax Italiano (Chile)
- Francisca Lara, MF 29/07/1990 Club de Deportes Cobreloa (Chile)
- Francisca Mardones, MF 24/03/1989 Colo Colo (Chile)
- Adriana Moya, MF 10/09/1990 (Chile)
- Tatiana Perez, DF 23/10/1988 Santiago Morning (Chile)
- Maria Rojas, FW 17/12/1987 UTSA Roadrunners (USA)
- Camila Sáez, DF 17/10/1994 Club de Deportes Cobreloa (Chile)
- Rocio Soto, DF/MF 21/09/1993 Colo Colo (Chile)
- Daniela Zamora, FW 13/11/1990 Universidad de Chile (Chile)

=== Colombia ===
- Lady Andrade, MF/DL 10/01/1992 Formas Intimas (Colombia)
- Carolina Arias, DF 02/09/1990 LCCC Golden Eagles (USA)
- Katherine Arias, (USA) DF/MF 02/04/1986 Maryland Terrapins (USA)
- Katerin Castro, FW 21/11/1991 Estudiantes Futbol Club (El Salvador)
- Julieth Dominguez, DF 06/09/1993 Estudiantes Futbol Club (El Salvador)
- Angélica Hernández, DF 22/07/1994 Liga Bogota (Colombia)
- Fatima Montaño, DF 02/10/1984 Aguila Roja (Colombia)
- Daniela Montoya, MF 22/08/1990 Club Deportivo Formas Intimas (Colombia)
- Diana Ospina, MF 03/03/1989 Club Deportivo Formas Intimas (Colombia)
- Kelis Peduzine, DF/MF 21/04/1983 Deportivo Eba (Colombia)
- Catalina Perez, (USA) GK 08/11/1994 Team Boca Raton (USA)
- Hazleydi Rincon, MF/FW 27/07/1993 (Colombia)
- Carmen Rodallega, DF 15/07/1983 Club Deportivo Formas Intimas (Colombia)
- Kena Romero, FW 31/10/1987 Loperena Futbol Club (Colombia) 11/09/1991
- Jessica Sánchez, MF 11/09/1991 Liga Bogota (Colombia)
- Gavy Santos, DF/MF 01/02/1993 (Colombia)
- Sandra Sepúlveda, GK 03/03/1988 Club Deporivo Formas Intimas (Colombia)
- Catalina Usme, MF 25/12/1989 Club Deportivo Formas Intimas (Colombia)

=== Mexico ===
Head coach: (Mexico) Roberto Medina

No.	Pos.	Player	Date of birth (age)	Caps	Goals	Club
	DF	Marylin Díaz	November 18, 1991 (aged 19)		0	
	FW	Maribel Domínguez	November 18, 1978 (aged 32)		0	(Royal Spanish Football Federation) UE L'Estartit
	MF	Dinora Garza	January 24, 1988 (aged 23)		0	(Mexican Football Federation) Tigres de la UANL
	FW	Liliana Godoy	June 21, 1990 (aged 21)		0	
	FW	Stephany Mayor	September 23, 1991 (aged 20)		0	(Mexican Football Federation) UDLA Puebla
	MF	Liliana Mercado	October 22, 1988 (aged 22)		0	(Mexican Football Federation) UDLA Puebla
	DF	Valeria Miranda	August 18, 1992 (aged 19)		0	
	FW	Mónica Ocampo	January 4, 1987 (aged 24)		0	(United States Soccer Federation) Atlanta Beat
	FW	Verónica Pérez	May 18, 1988 (aged 23)		0	(United States Soccer Federation) Saint Louis Athletica
	DF	Kenti Robles	February 15, 1991 (aged 20)		0	(Royal Spanish Football Federation) FC Barcelona
	MF	Jennifer Ruiz	August 9, 1983 (aged 28)		0	
	FW	Tanya Samarzich	December 28, 1994 (aged 16)		0	
	DF	Rubí Sandoval	January 18, 1984 (aged 27)		0	
	GK	Cecilia Santiago	October 19, 1994 (aged 17)		0	(Mexican Football Federation) Club Santos Laguna
	DF	Luz del Rosario Saucedo	December 14, 1983 (aged 27)		0	
	GK	Pamela Tajonar	July 7, 1988 (aged 23)		0	(Swedish Football Association) Malmö
	DF	Monica Vergara	May 2, 1983 (aged 28)		0	
	MF	Guadalupe Worbis	December 12, 1983 (aged 27)		0	(Royal Spanish Football Federation) Extremadura

  - (Nº)Marylin Diaz DF 18/11/1991 Unio Esportiva LE startit (Spain) **(Nº)Valeria Miranda DF 18/08/1992 Pumas UNAM (Mexico) **(Nº)Rubi Sandoval (USA) DF 18/01/1984 Futbol Club Santa Clarita (USA) **(Nº)Luz del Rosario Saucedo DF 14/12/1983 (Mexico) **(Nº)Monica Vergara DF 02/05/1983 (Mexico)
  - (Nº)Jennifer Ruiz (USA) DF/MF 09/08/1983 BayArea Breeze (USA)
  - (Nº)Liliana Godoy FW 21/06/1990 (Mexico) **(Nº)Tanya Samarzich (USA) and (Serbia) FW 28/12/1994 Legends Football Club (USA)

=== Trinidad and Tobago ===
- Kimika Forbes, GK 28/08/1990 Monroe Mustangs (USA)
- Shalette Alexander, GK 20/02/1993 (Trinidad and Tobago)
- Karyn Forbes, DF/MF 27/08/1991 (Trinidad and Tobago)
- Tiana Bateau, DF 10/01/1991 Grambling State Tigers (USA)
- Arin King, DF (Canada) 08/02/1991 Toronto Varsity Blues (Canada)
- Danielle Blair, DF (Canada) 16/08/1988 (Trinidad and Tobago)
- Maylee Atthin-Johnson, FW 05/09/1986 (Trinidad and Tobago)
- Anastasia Prescott, DF 27/06/1987 (Trinidad and Tobago)
- Victoria Swift, MF 29/01/1995 (Trinidad and Tobago)
- Candace Edwards, MF 16/11/1988 (Trinidad and Tobago)
- Kennya Cordner, FW 11/11/1988 Brisbane Roar Football Club (Australia)
- Lauryn Hutchinson, FW (USA) 06/12/1991 VCU Rams (USA)
- Rhea Belgrave, DF 19/07/1991 Concordia Clippers (USA)
- Tasha St. Louis, MF/FW 20/12/1983 St.Ann`s Rangers (Trinidad and Tobago)
- Nadia James, DF 01/01/1985 (Trinidad and Tobago)
- Ahkeela Mollon, FW 02/04/1985 UMF Aftureldin (Iceland)
- Dernelle Mascall, MF 20/10/1988 Grindavik (Iceland)
- Janine François, MF/FW 01/01/1989 SSCU Lady Bulldogs (USA)

== Group B ==
=== Argentina ===
- Analía Almeida MF 19/08/1985 San Lorenzo de Almagro (Argentina)
- Gabriela Barrios DF 05/04/1990 (Argentina)
- Agustina Barroso DF 20/05/1993 UAI Urquiza (Argentina)
- Maria Gimena Blanco (Italy) MF 05/12/1987 River Plate (Argentina)
- Gabriela Chávez DF 09/04/1989 Boca Juniors (Argentina)
- Noelia Espíndola DF 06/04/1992 San Lorenzo de Almagro (Argentina)
- Marisa Farina DF 16/06/1986 (Argentina)
- Delfina Fernández MF 30/06/1995 (Argentina)
- Emilia Mendieta FW 04/02/1988 River Plate (Argentina)
- Elisabeth Minnig GK 06/01/1987 Boca Juniors (Argentina)
- Andrea Ojeda FW 17/01/1985 Boca Juniors (Argentina)
- Laurina Oliveros GK 10/09/1993 UAI Urquiza (Argentina)
- Mercedes Pereyra MF/FW 07/05/1987 River Plate (Argentina)
- Belén Potassa FW (Spain) 12/12/1988 Boca Juniors (Argentina)
- María Florencia Quiñones DF/MF 26/08/1986 San Lorenzo de Almagro (Argentina)
- Betina Fernanda Soriano MF/FW 01/03/1994 Belgrano de Cordoba (Argentina)
- Amancay Urbani MF/FW 07/12/1991 (Argentina)
- Fabiana Vallejos MF 30/07/1985 Club de Deportes Cobreloa (Chile)

=== Brazil ===
- Francielle Alberto MF 18/10/1989 Sao Jose Esporte Clube (Brazil)
- Rosana Augusto DF/MF 07/07/1982 Associacao Desportiva Centro Olimpico (Brazil)
- Barbara Barbosa GK 04/07/1988 Foz Cataratas Futebol Clube (Brazil)
- Daniele Batista FW/MF 02/04/1983 Sao Jose Esporte Clube (Brazil)
- Renata Costa DF/MF 08/07/1986 Foz Cataratas Futebol Clube (Brazil)
- Debora De Oliveira FW 20/10/1991 Foz Cataratas Futebol Clube (Brazil)
- Maurine Goncalves DF/MF 14/01/1986 Santos Futebol Clube (Brazil)
- Thais Guedes MF 20/01/1993 Associacao Academica e Desportiva Vitoria das Tabocas (Brazil)
- Beatriz Joao FW 17/12/1993 Associacao Academica e Desportiva Vitoria das Tabocas (Brazil)
- Miraildes Mota MF 03/03/1978 Sao Jose Esporte Clube (Brazil)
- Grazielle Nascimento MF/FW 28/03/1981 America Futebol Clube Sao Jose do Rio Preto (Brazil)
- Tania Pereira DF/MF 03/10/1974 Duque de Caixas Futebol Clube (Brazil)
- Thais Picarte GK 22/09/1982 Bangu Esporte Clube (Brazil)
- Karen Rocha DF 17/02/1985 Duque de Caixas Futebol Clube (Brazil)
- Daiane Rodrigues DF/MF 15/04/1983 Sao Jose Esporte Clube (Brazil)
- Andreia Santos DF/MF 30/04/1977 Club de Regatas Vasco da Gama (Brazil)
- Renata Santos DF/MF 01/11/1985 Duque de Caixas Futebol Clube (Brazil)
- Ketlen Wiggers FW 07/01/1992 Bangu Atletico Clube (Brazil)

=== Canada ===
Head coach: (England) John Herdman

No.	Pos.	Player	Date of birth (age)	Caps	Goals	Club
1	GK	Karina LeBlanc	March 30, 1980 (aged 31)	90	0	(United States Soccer Federation) magicJack
2	MF	Kelly Parker	March 8, 1981 (aged 30)	17	1	(United States Soccer Federation) Atlanta Beat
3	MF	Melanie Booth	August 24, 1983 (aged 28)	51	1	(Canadian Soccer Association) Vancouver Whitecaps
4	DF	Vanessa Legault-Cordisco	November 5, 1992 (aged 18)	1	0	(United States Soccer Federation) Marquette University
5	DF	Robyn Gayle	October 31, 1985 (aged 25)	47	0	(Canadian Soccer Association) Vancouver Whitecaps
6	MF	Kaylyn Kyle	October 6, 1988 (aged 23)	37	2	(Canadian Soccer Association) Vancouver Whitecaps
7	DF	Rhian Wilkinson	May 12, 1982 (aged 29)	105	7	(Norwegian Football Federation) Lillestrøm SK
8	MF	Diana Matheson	April 6, 1984 (aged 27)	127	10	(Norwegian Football Federation) Lillestrøm SK
9	DF	Candace Chapman	April 2, 1983 (aged 28)	91	6	(United States Soccer Federation) Western New York Flash
10	FW	Christina Julien	May 6, 1988 (aged 23)	32	7	(Canadian Soccer Association) Ottawa Fury Women
11	MF	Desiree Scott	July 31, 1987 (aged 24)	26	0	(Canadian Soccer Association) Vancouver Whitecaps
12	FW	Christine Sinclair (c)	June 12, 1983 (aged 28)	162	117	(United States Soccer Federation) Western New York Flash
13	MF	Sophie Schmidt	June 28, 1988 (aged 23)	68	3	(United States Soccer Federation) magicJack
14	DF	Lauren Sesselmann	August 14, 1983 (aged 28)	2	0	(United States Soccer Federation) Atlanta Beat
15	MF	Diamond Simpson	April 28, 1993 (aged 18)	3	0	(Canadian Soccer Association) Dixie SC
16	DF	Shannon Woeller	January 31, 1990 (aged 21)	4	0	(United States Soccer Federation) Rutgers University
17	FW	Brittany Timko	September 5, 1985 (aged 26)	103	4	(German Football Association) SGS Essen
18	GK	Rachelle Beanlands	November 5, 1993 (aged 17)	0	0	(Canadian Soccer Association) Ottawa Fury Women

=== Costa Rica ===
- Wendy Acosta, FW/DF 19/12/1989 Dimas Escazu (Costa Rica)
- Katherine Alvarado, MF 11/04/1991 Club Deportivo Saprissa (Costa Rica)
- Julieth Arias, GK 06/12/1990 Club Deportivo Saprissa (Costa Rica)
- Yirlania Arroyo, GK 28/05/1986 Arenal Coronado (Costa Rica)
- Mariela Campos, MF 04/01/1991 Universidad Central Alajuela (Costa Rica)
- Daniela Cruz, DF 08/03/1991 West Florida Argonauts (USA)
- Shirley Cruz, MF 28/05/1985 OL Lyonnes (France)
- Karolina Durán, FW 07/01/1995 (Costa Rica)
- María Gamboa, MF 07/07/1993 Asociacion Deportiva Ramonense (Costa Rica)
- Hazel Quirós, DF 07/07/1992 Universidad Central Alajuela (Costa Rica)
- Lixy Rodríguez, DF 04/11/1990 Universidad Central Alajuela (Costa Rica)
- Raquel Rodríguez, MF/FW 28/10/1993 Penn State Nittany Lions (USA)
- Saudy Rosales, FW 13/10/1985 (Costa Rica)
- Diana Sáenz, DF 15/04/1989 Arenal de Coronado (Costa Rica)
- Carol Sánchez, DF 16/04/1986 VCU Rams (USA)
- Carolina Venegas, FW 28/09/1991 Arenal de Coronado (Costa Rica)
- Yendry Villalobos, MF 27/05/1984 Arenal de Coronado (Costa Rica)
