= Football at the 2008 Summer Olympics – Women's qualification (CONMEBOL–CAF play-off) =

2008 Women's Olympic Football Tournament qualification (CONMEBOL–CAF play-off)
- Event: Football at the 2008 Summer Olympics – Women's qualification
Brazil	Ghana
(Brazil)	(Ghana)
5	1
- Brazil qualified for the 2008 Summer Olympics
- Date: 19 April 2008
- Venue: Workers' Stadium, Beijing
- Referee: Niu Huijun (China PR)
- Attendance: 21,185

The CONMEBOL–CAF play-off of the 2008 Women's Olympic Football Tournament qualification competition was a single-legged knockout match that decided one spot in the Olympic football tournament in China. The play-off was contested by the runners-up from CONMEBOL, Brazil, and the runners-up from CAF, Ghana. Brazil won the match 5–1 to qualify for their fourth successive Olympic football tournament.

== Qualified teams ==
Confederation	Placement	Team
CONMEBOL	2006 South American Women's Football Championship 2nd place	Brazil
CAF	2008 CAF Women's Pre-Olympic Tournament 2nd place	Ghana

== Summary ==
The play-off took place on 19 April 2008 in a single, one-off match at the Workers' Stadium in Beijing, China (a neutral venue).

Team 1	Score	Team 2
Brazil	5–1	Ghana

== Match ==
19 April 2008
19:45 UTC+8

Brazil	5–1	Ghana
Marta 19'; Cristiane 42', 71'; Aline 53'; Rosana 72'	Report	Amankwa 76'

Workers' Stadium, Beijing
Attendance: 21,185
Referee: Niu Huijun (China PR)

Brazil	Ghana

GK	1	Bárbara
DF	3	Aline
DF	4	Tânia
DF	5	Renata Costa
DF	6	Rosana
MF	7	Daniela
MF	8	Formiga
MF	9	Maycon
MF	14	Ester
FW	10	Marta
FW	11	Cristiane	Substituted off
Substitutions:
GK	12	Maravilha
DF	2	Danielle
DF	13	Mônica
MF	15	Maurine
MF	17	Francielle
FW	16	Grazielle	Substituted on
FW	18	Fabiana
Substitutes:
Jorge Barcellos

GK	16	Memunatu Sulemana
DF	2	Aminatu Ibrahim
DF	12	Olivia Amoako
DF	13	Yaa Avoe
DF	17	Portia Boakye
MF	6	Florence Okoe
MF	10	Adjoa Bayor	(substituted off) A'
FW	7	Safia Abdul Rahman	(substituted off) B'
FW	9	Diana Ankomah	(substituted off) C'
FW	11	Gloria Foriwa
FW	18	Anita Amankwa
Substitutes:
GK	1	Gladys Quansah
DF	3	Ama Saabi
DF	5	Patience Kpobi
MF	4	Doreen Awuah	(substituted on) C'
MF	8	Sheila Okai	(substituted on) A'
MF	14	Leticia Zikpi	(substituted on) B'
FW	15	Silla Owusu
Manager:
Abdul Mumuni Gamel

Match rules

- 90 minutes.
- 30 minutes of extra time if necessary.
- Penalty shoot-out if scores still level.
- Seven named substitutes, of which up to three may be used.

== Goalscorers ==
There were 6 goals scored in 1 match, for an average of 6 goals per match.

2 goals

- (Brazil) Cristiane

1 goal

- (Brazil) Aline
- (Brazil) Marta
- (Brazil) Rosana
- (Ghana) Anita Amankwa
