= Football at the 2008 Summer Olympics – Women's qualification =

The qualification for women's football tournament at the 2008 Summer Olympics.

== Qualifications ==
A total of twelve teams will participate in the finals of the Olympic tournament for women. These finalists were:

Confederation/Region	Berths	Qualified Teams
Host nation (automatically qualified)	1	China
UEFA (Europe)	3	Germany; Norway; Sweden
CONMEBOL (South America)	1	Argentina
CONCACAF (North, Central America and Caribbean)	2	United States; Canada
CAF (Africa)	1	Nigeria
AFC (Asia)	2	Japan; North Korea
OFC (Oceania)	1	New Zealand
CONMEBOL–CAF play-off play-off	1	Brazil

== AFC ==
China was automatically qualified for the Olympics as host.

=== First round ===
Japan and North Korea received bye for the final round. Other 12 teams are divided into 3 groups, where top two teams in each group would advance to the final round.

Group A was played as a knockout tournament of two-legged (Home&Away) matches. Each of Group B and Group C was played as a single round robin.

==== Group A ====
First leg played on 17 February 2007. Second leg played on 25 February 2007.

Team 1	Agg	Team 2	1st leg	2nd leg
Hong Kong		Jordan*		
South Korea	8–0	India	5–0	3–0

Hong Kong through to the final after Jordan withdrew from the tournament. The final first and second leg played on 10 March 2007 and 18 March 2007 respectively.

Team 1	Agg	Team 2	1st leg	2nd leg
Hong Kong	3–2	South Korea	2–2	1–0

==== Group B ====
All matches were held at Thai-Japanese Stadium (Bangkok, Thailand).

Team	Pts	Pld	W	D	L	GF	GA	GD
Thailand (host)	9	3	3	0	0	15	0	+15
Vietnam	6	3	2	0	1	8	1	+7
Singapore	3	3	1	0	2	6	8	−2
Maldives	0	3	0	0	3	0	20	−20

19 February 2007

Maldives	0–6	Singapore

Thai-Japanese Stadium, Bangkok
19 February 2007

Thailand	1–0	Vietnam
85'

Thai-Japanese Stadium, Bangkok
21 February 2007

Thailand	5–0	Singapore

Thai-Japanese Stadium, Bangkok
21 February 2007

Vietnam	5–0	Maldives
Văn Thị Thanh 16' (pen.); Bùi Thị Tuyết Mai 19', 33', 58'; Nguyễn Thị Minh Nguyệt 50'

Thai-Japanese Stadium, Bangkok
23 February 2007

Vietnam	3–0	Singapore
Bùi Thị Tuyết Mai 18', 22', 72'

Thai-Japanese Stadium, Bangkok
23 February 2007

Thailand	9–0	Maldives

Thai-Japanese Stadium, Bangkok

==== Group C ====
All matches were held at Zhongshan Soccer Stadium (Taipei, Taiwan).

Team	Pts	Pld	W	D	L	GF	GA	GD
Australia	9	3	3	0	0	20	1	+19
Chinese Taipei (host)	6	3	2	0	1	4	8	−4
Myanmar	1	3	0	1	2	1	4	−3
Uzbekistan	1	3	0	1	2	1	13	−12

21 February 2007

Chinese Taipei	2–0	Uzbekistan
Australia	2–0	Myanmar

23 February 2007

Chinese Taipei	1–0	Myanmar
Uzbekistan	0–10	Australia

25 February 2007

Chinese Taipei	1–8	Australia
Uzbekistan	1–1	Myanmar

=== Final Round ===
Group winners would qualify for the Olympics. Matches played from 7 April to 12 August 2007.

==== Group A ====
Team	Pts	Pld	W	D	L	GF	GA	GD
Japan	16	6	5	1	0	27	3	+24
South Korea	8	6	2	2	2	8	12	−4
Thailand	7	6	2	1	3	7	11	−4
Vietnam	3	6	1	0	5	3	19	−16

7 April 2007
16:00

Japan	2–0	Vietnam
Sawa 36'; Sakai 73'

National Olympic Stadium, Tokyo
7 April 2007
15:00

South Korea	0–1	Thailand

Ansan Wa~ Stadium, Ansan

15 April 2007
19:00

Thailand	0–4	Japan
		Sawa 38'; Arakawa 41'; Ohno 44', 66'

Thai Army Sports Stadium, Bangkok
15 April 2007
16:00

Vietnam	1–2	South Korea
Đoàn Thị Kim Chi 25'		Ji So-Yun 55', 59'

Lạch Tray Stadium, Hai Phong

3 June 2007
19:00

Japan	6–1	South Korea
Miyamoto 9'; Ohno 21'; Arakawa 24'; Lee Kye-lim 34' (o.g.); Ito 66'; Sawa 68'		Jung Hae-in 74'

National Olympic Stadium, Tokyo
3 June 2007
17:00

Vietnam	1–0	Thailand
Nhiêu Thùy Linh 41'

Lạch Tray Stadium, Hai Phong

10 June 2007
17:00

South Korea	2–2	Japan
Kim Jin-hee 5'; Park Hee-young 64'		Ohno 11'; Miyama 37'

Bucheon Stadium, Bucheon
10 June 2007
16:00

Thailand	5–0	Vietnam

Rajamangala Stadium, Bangkok

4 August 2007
16:00

Thailand	1–1	South Korea

Thai-Japanese Stadium, Bangkok
4 August 2007
17:00

Vietnam	0–8	Japan
		Sakai 10'; Iwashimizu 17'; Ohno 36', 60'; Miyama 39'; Miyamoto 70'; Sawa 72'; Nagasato 80'

Lạch Tray Stadium, Hai Phong

12 August 2007
19:00

South Korea	2–1	Vietnam
Ji So-yun 14'; 39'		Đỗ Thị Ngọc Châm 32'

Cheongju Stadium, Cheongju
12 August 2007
19:00

Japan	5–0	Thailand
Ohno 1'; Nagasato 30'; Yanagita 45'; Sawa 45+2'; Sakaguchi 89'

National Olympic Stadium, Tokyo

==== Group B ====
Team	Pts	Pld	W	D	L	GF	GA	GD
North Korea	18	6	6	0	0	51	0	+51
Australia	12	6	4	0	2	40	5	+35
Chinese Taipei	6	6	2	0	4	12	31	−19
Hong Kong	0	6	0	0	6	1	68	−67

7 April 2007
16:00

North Korea	8–0	Chinese Taipei

Kim Il-sung Stadium, Pyongyang
7 April 2007
15:00

Australia	15–0	Hong Kong
Walsh 10', 12'; McCallum 16', 43', 54'; Gill 26', 52', 72', 74', 89'; Peters 33'; Burgess 56'; Small 72'; Salisbury 85', 87'

BCU International Stadium, Coffs Harbour

15 April 2007
16:00

Chinese Taipei	0–10	Australia
		Gill 6', 28', 29'; Walsh 18', 32', 45'; Peters 42', 57'; Salisbury 81'; Burgess 83'

Chungshan Stadium, Taipei
15 April 2007
15:00

Hong Kong	0–14	North Korea

Siu Sai Wan Sports Ground, Hong Kong

3 June 2007
18:00

Chinese Taipei	6–0	Hong Kong

Chungshan Stadium, Taipei
3 June 2007
18:00

North Korea	2–0	Australia
Ri Kum-suk 35', 55' (pen.)

Yanggakdo Stadium, Pyongyang

10 June 2007
15:00

Hong Kong	0–6	Chinese Taipei

Mong Kok Stadium, Hong Kong
10 June 2007
15:00

Australia	0–2	North Korea
		Ri Kum-suk 60'; Kim Kyong-hwa 69'

BCU International Stadium, Coffs Harbour

4 August 2007
18:00

Chinese Taipei	0–6	North Korea

Chungshan Stadium, Taipei
4 August 2007
15:30

Hong Kong	1–8	Australia
Chan Wing Sze 52'		Perry 2'; Rollason 19', 56'; Butt 45'; Lai Hing Chin 50', 74' (o.g.); Cooper 53'; Kingsley 83'

Hong Kong Stadium, Hong Kong

12 August 2007
17:00

North Korea	19–0	Hong Kong

Kim Il-sung Stadium, Pyongyang
12 August 2007
15:00

Australia	7–0	Chinese Taipei
Munoz 3', 82', 84'; Walsh 25'; Garriock 31'; Peters 60'; Gill 89'

BCU International Stadium, Coffs Harbour

== CAF ==
Preliminary competition was divided in four rounds. First three rounds was knock-out rounds, and the final round was a group stage.

The winners of the final round would qualify for the Olympics. The runners-up of the round would advance to inter-continental play-off.

=== Preliminary round ===
First leg played from 27 to 29 October 2006. Second leg played from 10 to 12 November 2006.

Team 1	Agg.	Team 2	1st leg	2nd leg
Angola	w/o	Tanzania	—	—
Mozambique	7–2	Comoros	7–2	w/o
Guinea-Bissau	2–4	Guinea	1–1	1–3
Benin	w/o	Namibia	—	—
Uganda	w/o	Eritrea	—	—

=== First round ===
First leg played on 17 and 18 February 2007. Second leg will play from 9 to 11 March 2007. Eritrea and Morocco will play their matches on 10 and 24 March 2007. Guinea and Zimbabwe only played one leg in Zimbabwe due to political unrest in Guinea.

Team 1	Agg.	Team 2	1st leg	2nd leg
Angola	1–4	Ghana	1–2	0–2
Equatorial Guinea	4–5	South Africa	2–1	2–4
Liberia	0–5	Ethiopia	0–3	0–2
Nigeria	w/o	Senegal	—	—
Mozambique	1–12	Algeria	0–3	1–9
Eritrea	4–4 (a)	Morocco	3–2	1–2
Namibia	5–8	DR Congo	3–3	2–5
Guinea	1–6	Zimbabwe	—	1–6

=== Second round ===
First leg played from 1 to 3 June 2007. Second leg played from 15 to 17 June 2007.

Team 1	Agg.	Team 2	1st leg	2nd leg
Ghana	4–1	DR Congo	3–1	1–0
Algeria	1–6	Nigeria	1–0	0–6
South Africa	5–3	Zimbabwe	2–1	3–2
Ethiopia	2–2 (a)	Morocco	1–0	1–2

=== Final Round ===
Matches played between 27 July 2007 and 14 March 2008. Ethiopia withdrew.

Team	Pld	W	D	L	GF	GA	GD	Pts
Nigeria	4	3	0	1	8	1	+7	9
Ghana	4	3	0	1	4	3	+1	9
South Africa	4	0	0	4	1	9	−8	0
Ethiopia	withdraw							

28 July 2007

Nigeria	5–0	South Africa
Uwak; Nkwocha; Mbachu; Chiejine

National Stadium, Abuja
28 July 2007

Ethiopia	1–3 (later annuled)	Ghana
?		Bayor 10'; Foriwa; Darko

Addis Ababa

12 August 2007

Ghana	1–0	Nigeria
? (o.g.)

El Wak Stadium, Accra

26 August 2007

South Africa	0–1	Ghana
	Report	Amankwah

Caledonian Stadium, Pretoria

9 December 2007

Ghana	2–1	South Africa
Abdul Rahman 15'; Okoe 88'	Report	Phewa 13'

Accra Sports Stadium, Accra

16 February 2008

South Africa	0–1	Nigeria
		Nkwocha

Caledonian Stadium, Pretoria

15 March 2008

Nigeria	2–0	Ghana
Uwak 38', 88'	Report

National Stadium, Abuja
Referee: Aisa Mabikko (Uganda)

Nigeria qualified for the Olympics. Ghana advanced to the inter-continental play-off.

== CONCACAF ==
=== Preliminary round ===
==== Caribbean Zone ====
The system is a two-round single round robin format, held in October 2007. Four groups will play the first round (3 groups of 4 and one group of 3), with the winners moving on to a second round group.

===== First round =====
Group 1
Group 2

Pos	Team	Pld	Pts
1	Trinidad and Tobago	3	9
2	Suriname (H)	3	6
3	Grenada	3	3
4	Saint Vincent and the Grenadines	3	0

Source: CONCACAF
(H) Hosts

Pos	Team	Pld	Pts
1	Cuba	3	9
2	Dominican Republic (H)	3	6
3	U.S. Virgin Islands	3	3
4	British Virgin Islands	3	0

Source: CONCACAF
(H) Hosts
Group 3
Group 4

Pos	Team	Pld	Pts
1	Jamaica	3	9
2	Bermuda	3	6
3	Antigua and Barbuda (H)	3	3
4	Dominica	3	0

Source: CONCACAF
(H) Hosts

Pos	Team	Pld	Pts
1	Puerto Rico	2	6
2	Haiti	2	3
3	Cayman Islands (H)	2	0

Source: CONCACAF
(H) Hosts

===== Second round =====
The 4 remaining teams were drawn into 2 pairings. The winners of each tie will progress to the CONCACAF Finals. Both Puerto Rico v Trinidad & Tobago matches will be played in Puerto Rico on 23 & 25 November 2007. Cuba will play both legs at home against Jamaica on 29 November and 1 December 2007, with the second match counting as Jamaica's home match for away goals purposes.

Team 1	Agg.	Team 2	1st leg	2nd leg
Puerto Rico	2–2 (a)	Trinidad and Tobago	1–2	1–0
Cuba	0–3	Jamaica	0–1	0–2

==== Central American Zone ====
Two home and away series will be played, with the winners moving on to the final round. The first leg will play on 6 October 2007. The second leg will play on 13 October 2007. The winners of the ties will play in the decisive final round on 20 and 27 October 2007.

Panama withdrew from their scheduled match against Costa Rica, so Costa Rica advance to the 2nd Round where they will play the winner of El Salvador v Nicaragua.

First round
El Salvador	1	0	1
Nicaragua	2	3	5
Panama	—	—
Costa Rica	—	—	w/o

Second round
Nicaragua	0	0	0
Costa Rica	3	6	9

=== Group stage ===
Six teams will qualify for the final round. The final round will be held at the Estadio Olímpico Universitario in Ciudad Juárez, Mexico, from 2–13 April. The draw was held at 11:00 am (EST) on 25 February.

Group A

Pos	Team	Pld	Pts
1	United States	2	6
2	Mexico (H)	2	3
3	Jamaica	2	0

Source: CONCACAF
(H) Hosts
Group B

Pos	Team	Pld	Pts
1	Canada	2	6
2	Costa Rica	2	1
3	Trinidad and Tobago	2	1

Source: CONCACAF

=== Knockout stage ===
The winners of the semi-finals qualified for the Olympics.

Semi-finals
9 April – Ciudad Juárez
Canada	1
Mexico	0
9 April – Ciudad Juárez
United States	3
Costa Rica	0

Final
12 April – Ciudad Juárez
Canada	1 (5)
United States (p)	1 (6)
Third place play-off
12 April – Ciudad Juárez
Mexico	1
Costa Rica	0

== CONMEBOL ==
CONMEBOL announced that the 2006 Sudamericano Femenino in Argentina would also serve as the qualifying tournament for the Olympics. Argentina won the tournament, and qualified for the Olympics. The runners-up Brazil advanced to the inter-continental play-off.

== OFC ==
The 2007 Pacific Games was played as the first part of Oceania qualification for the 2008 Olympics. The winners of the Pacific Games, Papua New Guinea, met New Zealand in a playoff in March 2008 for a place in the Olympic Games Finals. This had originally been scheduled over two legs (on 8 and 12 March) but the New Zealand leg was cancelled by mutual consent, leaving a single play-off match in Papua New Guinea.

Team 1	Result	Team 2
Papua New Guinea	0–2	New Zealand

== UEFA ==
UEFA announced that the 2007 Women's World Cup in the People's Republic of China will also serve as the qualifying tournament for the Olympics. Originally it was thought that, should England make the top three European teams, they would compete under the United Kingdom banner. However, on 6 September 2007, FIFA issued a press release indicating that England are ineligible to participate in the 2008 Olympics as England does not have its own Olympic Committee.

As the result of the World Cup, Germany (winners) and Norway (fourth place) qualified for the Olympics, while Sweden and Denmark (both eliminated in the group stage) qualified for the play-off. There has been some further confusion over the identity of the UEFA qualifiers stemming from conflicting media releases from UEFA and FIFA. The FIFA release noted that "teams eliminated at the end of the group phase will have the same ranking irrespective of their position, number of points or goal differences", which implies that Sweden and Denmark will require a playoff for the final qualification spot. While UEFA initially stated that no playoff was required The official website for European football, this was amended fairly rapidly The official website for European football.

=== Olympic play-off ===
Team 1	Agg.	Team 2	1st leg	2nd leg
Denmark	3–7	Sweden	2–4	1–3

8 November 2007
19:00 UTC+1

Denmark	2–4	Sweden
Sørensen 31'; Pape 73'	report (UEFA) report (Danish FA)	Landström 30'; Schelin 46', 65'; Seger 49'

Energi Viborg Arena, Viborg
Attendance: 4,011
Referee: Cristina Ionescu (Romania)
28 November 2007
19:00 UTC+1

Sweden	3–1	Denmark
Schelin 43'; Svensson 45', 74'	report (UEFA) report (Danish FA)	Sørensen 80'

Råsundastadion, Solna
Attendance: 4,078
Referee: Alexandra Ihringova (England)

Sweden won 7–3 on aggregate and qualified for the Olympics.

== CONMEBOL–CAF play-off ==
An inter-continental play-off was held between the second placed South American and African teams, which were Brazil and Ghana, respectively. The play-off took place on 19 April 2008 in a single, one-off match at the Workers' Stadium in Beijing, China (a neutral venue).

Team 1	Score	Team 2
Brazil	5–1	Ghana
