= 2008 CONCACAF Women's Olympic Qualifying Tournament qualification =

Tournament details
- Dates: 2 October – 1 December 2007
- Teams: 22

Tournament statistics
- Matches played: 29
- Goals scored: 178 (6.14 per match)
- Top scorer: (Jamaica) Tashana Vincent (11 goals)

The 2008 CONCACAF Women's Olympic Qualifying Tournament qualification determined the two teams from the Caribbean and one team from Central America that joined Canada, Mexico and the United States at the 2008 CONCACAF Women's Olympic Qualifying Tournament in Mexico.

== Caribbean Zone ==
The Caribbean Zone qualifying was held in two rounds from October to December 2007.

=== First round ===
Four groups were played in the first round (three groups of four and one group of three), with the group winners moving on to a second round.

==== Group 1 ====
Pos	Team	Pld	W	D	L	GF	GA	GD	Pts	Qualification
1	Trinidad and Tobago	3	3	0	0	19	1	+18	9	Advance to second round
2	Suriname (H)	3	2	0	1	17	6	+11	6	
3	Grenada	3	1	0	2	4	14	−10	3	
4	Saint Vincent and the Grenadines	3	0	0	3	3	22	−19	0	

Source: CONCACAF
(H) Hosts
2 October 2007

Trinidad and Tobago	9–0	Saint Vincent and the Grenadines
St. Louis 17', 51'; Isaac 19', 47', 78', 85'; Noel 52'; Shade 72'; Reyes 90+'

Dr. Ir. Franklin Essed Stadion, Paramaribo
Attendance: 85
Referee: Otis James (Guyana)
2 October 2007

Suriname	6–1	Grenada
Smit 44'; Saling 56', 68', 71'; Wisch 64'; Rigthers 87'		Dyslyne 22'

Dr. Ir. Franklin Essed Stadion, Paramaribo
Attendance: 185
Referee: Stanley Lancaster (Guyana)

4 October 2007

Trinidad and Tobago	6–0	Grenada
Isaac 22'; St. Louis 44', 45', 73'; Shade 48'; Nedd 90'

Dr. Ir. Franklin Essed Stadion, Paramaribo
Referee: Ronald Persaud (Guyana)
4 October 2007

Suriname	10–1	Saint Vincent and the Grenadines
Saling 1', 4', 35', 37', 46', 90+'; Smit 27', 56', 67'; Alimoenadi 50'		Trimmingham 43'

Dr. Ir. Franklin Essed Stadion, Paramaribo
Referee: Otis James (Guyana)

7 October 2007

Saint Vincent and the Grenadines	2–3	Grenada
Trimmingham 22', 30'		Dyslyne 23', 89'; Thomas 50'

Dr. Ir. Franklin Essed Stadion, Paramaribo
Attendance: 800
Referee: Ronald Persaud (Guyana)
7 October 2007

Suriname	1–4	Trinidad and Tobago
Hasselnook 90+'		Nedd 25'; St. Louis 30', 88'; Forbes 81'

Dr. Ir. Franklin Essed Stadion, Paramaribo
Attendance: 1,000
Referee: Stanley Lancaster (Guyana)

==== Group 2 ====
Pos	Team	Pld	W	D	L	GF	GA	GD	Pts	Qualification
1	Cuba	3	3	0	0	37	1	+36	9	Advance to second round
2	Dominican Republic (H)	3	2	0	1	22	2	+20	6	
3	U.S. Virgin Islands	3	1	0	2	5	18	−13	3	
4	British Virgin Islands	3	0	0	3	0	43	−43	0	

Source: CONCACAF
(H) Hosts
3 October 2007

Dominican Republic	4–0	U.S. Virgin Islands
Astacio 16'; Martínez 37', 53'; Fernández 76'

Estadio Parque del Este, Santo Domingo Este
Attendance: 100
Referee: Davio Edren (Haiti)
3 October 2007

Cuba	21–0	British Virgin Islands
Larrinaga 3', 25'; M. Reyes 5', 10', 11', 21'; Gallardo 9', 32', 49', 69', 75'; Kelly 15'; Cuesta 47', 68', 71', 78'; Yi. Rodríguez 55'; Negrín 63', 83'; Yu. Rodríguez 76'; Y. Reyes 88'

Estadio Parque del Este, Santo Domingo Este
Attendance: 150
Referee: Varnette Laing (Bahamas)

5 October 2007

U.S. Virgin Islands	0–14	Cuba
		Larrinaga 19', 49'; M. Reyes 22'; Gallardo 24', 61', 82'; Kelly 26', 38'; Negrín 29'; Galindo 52'; Aguilar 53'; Yi. Rodríguez 58'; Mora 71', 2H'

Estadio Parque del Este, Santo Domingo Este
Attendance: 200
Referee: Jesús Ángel Lebron Delgado (Puerto Rico)
5 October 2007

Dominican Republic	17–0	British Virgin Islands
Martínez 16', 25', 60'; Santana 18', 63', 79'; Peralta 19', 27', 56'; Frías 30', 80', 83', 90'; Astacio 35', 41'; Rodríguez 69', 90'

Estadio Parque del Este, Santo Domingo Este
Attendance: 250
Referee: Davio Edren (Haiti)

7 October 2007

U.S. Virgin Islands	5–0	British Virgin Islands
Stuart 23'; Harrison 36'; Kaza-Amlak 48', 74'; Taylor 76'

Estadio Parque del Este, Santo Domingo Este
Attendance: 500
Referee: Jesús Ángel Lebron Delgado (Puerto Rico)
7 October 2007

Dominican Republic	1–2	Cuba
Osana 35'		Gallardo 53', 90+'

Estadio Parque del Este, Santo Domingo Este
Referee: Varnette Laing (Bahamas)

==== Group 3 ====
Pos	Team	Pld	W	D	L	GF	GA	GD	Pts	Qualification
1	Jamaica	3	3	0	0	24	0	+24	9	Advance to second round
2	Bermuda	3	2	0	1	12	4	+8	6	
3	Antigua and Barbuda (H)	3	1	0	2	3	16	−13	3	
4	Dominica	3	0	0	3	0	19	−19	0	

Source: CONCACAF
(H) Hosts
3 October 2007

Jamaica	4–0	Bermuda
Reid 13', 22'; McGregor 16'; Vincent 53'

Antigua Recreation Ground, St. John's
Referee: María Casilla (Dominican Republic)
3 October 2007

Antigua and Barbuda	3–0	Dominica
Green 10'; London 27'; Jacobs 65'

Antigua Recreation Ground, St. John's
Referee: Monique Ras (Aruba)

5 October 2007

Bermuda	8–0	Dominica
Pitt 19'; Todd 21', 63'; C. Corlette 48' (o.g.); Bean 72', 88'; Bell 82'; Berkeley 87'

Antigua Recreation Ground, St. John's
Attendance: 100
Referee: Monique Ras (Aruba)
5 October 2007

Antigua and Barbuda	0–12	Jamaica
		Vincent 5', 12', 18', 34', 40', 55'; James 16'; McGregor 27'; Reid 35', 52', 89'; Thomas 50' (o.g.)

Antigua Recreation Ground, St. John's
Attendance: 275
Referee: Shane de Silva (Trinidad and Tobago)

7 October 2007

Dominica	0–8	Jamaica
		Vincent 2', 29', 35', 45'; Reid 38'; Mowatt 48'; McGregor 80'; McBean 83'

Antigua Recreation Ground, St. John's
Attendance: 500
Referee: Shane de Silva (Trinidad and Tobago)
7 October 2007

Antigua and Barbuda	0–4	Bermuda
		Wall 1'; Bean 24'; Todd 39', 45'

Antigua Recreation Ground, St. John's
Referee: María Casilla (Dominican Republic)

==== Group 4 ====
Pos	Team	Pld	W	D	L	GF	GA	GD	Pts	Qualification
1	Puerto Rico	2	2	0	0	5	0	+5	6	Advance to second round
2	Haiti	2	1	0	1	3	3	0	3	
3	Cayman Islands (H)	2	0	0	2	2	7	−5	0	

Source: CONCACAF
(H) Hosts
24 October 2007

Cayman Islands	0–4	Puerto Rico
		Chapa 30'; Hernández 32'; Valentín 40'; Tirelli 74'

The Annex, George Town
Attendance: 500
Referee: Irasema Aguilera (Cuba)

26 October 2007

Puerto Rico	1–0	Haiti
Felix 3'

North Side Field, North Side
Attendance: 350
Referee: Irasema Aguilera (Cuba)

28 October 2007

Cayman Islands	2–3	Haiti
Gall 1'; Bush 16'		Saintilmond 10'; Charles 40'; Dolce 45+'

North Side Field, North Side
Attendance: 500
Referee: Irasema Aguilera (Cuba)

=== Second round ===
The four remaining teams were drawn into two pairings. The winners of each tie progressed to the Olympic qualifying final tournament. Puerto Rico hosted both legs of their tie against Trinidad and Tobago in Bayamón, while Cuba hosted both legs of their tie against Jamaica in Havana. However, the away goals rule was still applied, with the visitors (Trinidad and Tobago and Jamaica) counted as the "home" teams for the second legs.

==== Summary ====
Team 1	Agg.	Team 2	1st leg	2nd leg
Puerto Rico	2–2 (a)	Trinidad and Tobago	1–2	1–0
Cuba	0–3	Jamaica	0–1	0–2

==== Matches ====
23 November 2007

Puerto Rico	1–2	Trinidad and Tobago
Tirelli 60'		Cordner 22'; St. Louis 87'

Juan Ramón Loubriel Stadium, Bayamón
Attendance: 1,500
Referee: Sabina Charles (Saint Lucia)
25 November 2007

Trinidad and Tobago	0–1	Puerto Rico
		Hernández 19'

Juan Ramón Loubriel Stadium, Bayamón
Attendance: 1,000
Referee: Hillaren Frederick (U.S. Virgin Islands)

2–2 on aggregate. Trinidad and Tobago won on away goals and qualified for the CONCACAF Women's Olympic Qualifying Tournament.

29 November 2007

Cuba	0–1	Jamaica
		Murray 63'

Estadio Pedro Marrero, Havana
Attendance: 3,000
Referee: Monique Ras (Aruba)
1 December 2007

Jamaica	2–0	Cuba
Reid 30'; Murray 86'

Estadio Pedro Marrero, Havana
Referee: Dianne Ferreira-James (Guyana)

Jamaica won 3–0 on aggregate and qualified for the CONCACAF Women's Olympic Qualifying Tournament.

== Central American Zone ==
=== Bracket ===
First round
El Salvador	1	0	1
Nicaragua	2	3	5
Panama	—	—
Costa Rica	—	—	w/o

Second round
Nicaragua	0	0	0
Costa Rica	3	6	9

=== First round ===
Two home and away series were scheduled to be played in the first round, with the winners advancing to the second round. Panama withdrew from their scheduled match against Costa Rica, so Costa Rica advanced on a walkover to the second round.

==== Summary ====
Team 1	Agg.	Team 2	1st leg	2nd leg
El Salvador	1–5	Nicaragua	1–2	0–3
Panama	w/o	Costa Rica	—	—

==== Matches ====
6 October 2007

El Salvador	1–2	Nicaragua
Flores 57'		Rojas 28', 44'

Estadio Cuscatlán, San Salvador
Referee: Ericka Vargas (Costa Rica)
13 October 2007

Nicaragua	3–0	El Salvador
Morales 34'; Rojas 55', 67'

Estadio Olímpico del IND Managua, Managua
Attendance: 300
Referee: Arlene Troya (Panama)

Nicaragua won 5–1 on aggregate and advanced to the second round.

6/7 October 2007

Panama	Cancelled	Costa Rica

13/14 October 2007

Costa Rica	Cancelled	Panama

Panama withdrew. Costa Rica won on walkover and advanced to the second round.

=== Second round ===
==== Summary ====
Team 1	Agg.	Team 2	1st leg	2nd leg
Nicaragua	0–9	Costa Rica	0–3	0–6

==== Matches ====
20 October 2007

Nicaragua	0–3	Costa Rica
		Acosta 5'; Bolaños 16'; Venegas 26'

Estadio Olímpico del IND Managua, Managua
Attendance: 1,000
Referee: Juana Benicia Padilla (Honduras)
27 October 2007

Costa Rica	6–0	Nicaragua
Malavassi 13'; Cruz 16'; Mendoza 23', 27'; Acosta 30'; Cruz 57'

Estadio Nacional de Costa Rica, San José
Attendance: 700
Referee: Arlene Troya (Panama)

Costa Rica won 9–0 on aggregate and qualified for the CONCACAF Women's Olympic Qualifying Tournament.

== Goalscorers ==
There were 178 goals scored in 29 matches, for an average of 6.14 goals per match.

11 goals

- (Jamaica) Tashana Vincent

10 goals

- (Cuba) Yezenia Gallardo

9 goals

- (Suriname) Jolanda Saling

8 goals

- (Trinidad and Tobago) Tasha St. Louis

7 goals

- (Jamaica) Kenesha Reid

5 goals

- (Cuba) Misleldis Reyes
- (Dominican Republic) Elizabeth Martínez
- (Trinidad and Tobago) Avanell Isaac

4 goals

- (Bermuda) Shunta Todd
- (Cuba) Niurka Cuesta
- (Cuba) Yohania Larrinaga
- (Dominican Republic) Ana Frías
- (Nicaragua) Modesta Rojas
- (Suriname) Aisa Smit

3 goals

- (Bermuda) Raneika Bean
- (Cuba) Danaysis Kelly
- (Cuba) Yohanna Negrín
- (Dominican Republic) Yajaira Astacio
- (Dominican Republic) Raynelsa Peralta
- (Dominican Republic) Oliva Santana
- (Grenada) Langaigne Dyslyne
- (Jamaica) Jodi-Ann McGregor
- (Saint Vincent and the Grenadines) Ria Trimmingham

2 goals

- (Costa Rica) Wendy Acosta
- (Costa Rica) Kandy Mendoza
- (Cuba) Yanelkis Mora
- (Cuba) Yisel Rodríguez
- (Dominican Republic) Yocelyn Rodríguez
- (Jamaica) Christina Murray
- (Puerto Rico) Rocío Hernández
- (Puerto Rico) Alicia Tirelli
- (Trinidad and Tobago) Jenelle Nedd
- (Trinidad and Tobago) Mariah Shade
- (United States Virgin Islands) Zauditu Kaza-Amlak

1 goal

- (Antigua and Barbuda) Amelia Green
- (Antigua and Barbuda) Britiney Jacobs
- (Antigua and Barbuda) Argell London
- (Bermuda) Cheyra Bell
- (Bermuda) Akil-Lah Berkeley
- (Bermuda) Brittany Pitt
- (Bermuda) Ashley Wall
- (Cayman Islands) Shakeima Bush
- (Cayman Islands) Shenel Gall
- (Costa Rica) Martha Isabel Bolaños
- (Costa Rica) Daniela Cruz
- (Costa Rica) Shirley Cruz
- (Costa Rica) Mónica Malavassi
- (Costa Rica) Adriana Venegas
- (Cuba) Yaimara Aguilar
- (Cuba) Yutmila Galindo
- (Cuba) Yudisleivi Reyes
- (Cuba) Yunelsis Rodríguez
- (Dominican Republic) Yahaira Fernández
- (Dominican Republic) Yolanda Osana
- (El Salvador) Adriana Flores
- (Grenada) Kishanee Thomas
- (Haiti) Fiorda Charles
- (Haiti) Wisline Dolce
- (Haiti) Adeline Saintilmond
- (Jamaica) Alicia James
- (Jamaica) Marcilee McBean
- (Jamaica) Iesha Mowatt
- (Nicaragua) Meylin Morales
- (Puerto Rico) Patricia Chapa
- (Puerto Rico) Angiemar Felix
- (Puerto Rico) Ivonne Valentín
- (Suriname) Cherrilyn Alimoenadi
- (Suriname) Lucretia Hasselnook
- (Suriname) Brigitta Rigthers
- (Suriname) Eleonoor Wisch
- (Trinidad and Tobago) Kennya Cordner
- (Trinidad and Tobago) Karyn Forbes
- (Trinidad and Tobago) Nikeisha Noel
- (Trinidad and Tobago) Niasha Reyes
- (United States Virgin Islands) Elizabeth Harrison
- (United States Virgin Islands) Christine Stuart
- (United States Virgin Islands) Mackiesh Taylor

1 own goal

- (Antigua and Barbuda) Judy Thomas (against Jamaica)
- (Dominica) Carita Corlette (against Bermuda)

Source: CONCACAF
