= Elizabeth Martinez =

Elizabeth Martinez may refer to:

- Elizabeth Martínez (1925–2021), American Chicana feminist and community activist
- Elizabeth Martínez (footballer) (born 1989), Dominican footballer
- Elizabeth Martinez (librarian) (born 1943), American librarian
