= Océane Toussaint =

Haitian footballer (born 2004)

Personal information
- Full name: Océane Nathalie Toussaint Dit Marseille
- Date of birth: 20 February 2004 (age 22)
- Place of birth: Bagnolet, France
- Height: 1.72 m (5 ft 8 in)
- Position: Goalkeeper

Team information
- Current team: Paris Saint-Germain
- Number: 33

Youth career
- 2014–2018: Racing Club de France
- 2018–2023: Paris Saint-Germain

Senior career*
Years	Team	Apps	(Gls)
2023–	Paris Saint-Germain	1	(0)
2024	→ Le Havre (loan)	0	(0)

International career^{‡}
2020	France U16	1	(0)
2021–2022	France U19	5	(0)
2022	France U20	1	(0)
2023	France U23	1	(0)
2026–	Haiti	1	(0)
- * Club domestic league appearances and goals as of 21 November 2026 ‡ National team caps and goals as of 5 June 2026

Océane Nathalie Toussaint Dit Marseille (born 20 February 2004) is a professional footballer who plays as a goalkeeper for Première Ligue club Paris Saint-Germain. Born in France and having previously represented France at the youth national level, she plays for the Haiti national team.

== Youth career ==
Toussaint was born and raised in the Bagnolet area of Paris, France. She started playing football in the nearby town of Colombes, eventually competing for Racing Club de France's youth teams from 2014 to 2018. In 2018, she moved to Paris Saint-Germain at the age of 14. She went on to help Paris Saint-Germain's under-19 team win the French national championship. In February 2023, she was named the PSG academy's fourth annual female Titi d’Or recipient.

== Club career ==
Near the end of 2022, Toussaint began regularly training with PSG's first-team squad. On 14 June 2023, she signed her first professional contract with the first team, penning a deal until 30 June 2026.

In January 2024, Toussaint was sent out on loan to fellow Première Ligue club Le Havre to fill in for Laëtitia Philippe until the end of the season. She made her professional debut at 19 years old, starting in a Coupe de France match against Paris FC shortly after joining her new club. Toussaint, whose loan did not include a buy option, returned to Paris Saint-Germain at the end of her half-season Le Havre stint; she had not made any further appearances since her debut.

Toussaint spent the following two seasons as the third-choice goalkeeper, with her teammate and friend Mary Earps taking up the majority of minutes in goal. On 4 February 2026, she debuted for PSG, keeping a clean sheet against Seconde Ligue side Thonon Evian Grand Genève in the Coupe LFFP quarter-finals. At the end of the 2025–26 season, she extended her contract with Paris Saint-Germain until the summer of 2028.

== International career ==
Toussaint earned her first call-up to the France youth national team system in 2020, getting an invite to the under-16 squad. She has since also appeared for France's U19, U20, and U23 teams.

In April 2026, Toussaint announced via social media that she had decided to represent Haiti, her country of heritage, on the international level. On 6 April 2026, she received her first-ever Haiti national team call-up ahead of 2027 FIFA Women's World Cup qualification matches against Anguilla and the Dominican Republic. Toussaint made her senior international debut on 5 June 2026, earning the start in a 2–1 victory over New Zealand.

== Personal life ==
Toussaint was previously in a relationship with Paris Saint-Germain men's team player Warren Zaïre-Emery; the couple had won their respective Titi d’Or awards in the same year. They concluded their relationship at the end of 2025.

== Career statistics ==
=== Club ===
As of match played 21 November 2026

Appearances and goals by club, season and competition
Club	Season	League			National cup		League cup		Continental		Other		Total	
Club	Season	Division	Apps	Goals	Apps	Goals	Apps	Goals	Apps	Goals	Apps	Goals	Apps	Goals
Paris Saint-Germain	2023–24	Première Ligue	0	0	0	0	—		0	0	0	0	0	0
Paris Saint-Germain	2024–25	Première Ligue	0	0	0	0	—		0	0	0	0	0	0
Paris Saint-Germain	2025–26	Première Ligue	0	0	0	0	1	0	0	0	0	0	1	0
Paris Saint-Germain	2026–27	Première Ligue	1	0	0	0	0	0	0	0	—		1	0
Paris Saint-Germain	Total		1	0	0	0	1	0	0	0	0	0	2	0
Le Havre (loan)	2023–24	Première Ligue	0	0	1	0	—		—		—		1	0
Career total			1	0	1	0	1	0	0	0	0	0	3	0

=== International ===
As of match played 5 June 2026

Appearances and goals by national team and year
National team	Year	Apps	Goals
Haiti	2026	1	0
Total		1	0
