= Patience Kpobi =

Ghanaian footballer

Personal information
- Full name: Patience Kpobi
- Date of birth: November 19, 1984 (age 41)
- Place of birth: Ghana
- Height: 1.65 m (5 ft 5 in)
- Position: Midfielder

Team information
- Current team: Ghana Police
- Number: 9

International career
Years	Team	Apps	(Gls)
2010–	Ghana	1	(0)

Patience Kpobi is a Ghanaian national football player whose playing positions include midfield and defence.

== International career ==
Although there is no indication that she appeared in the match, she was part of the match squad for the inter-continental play-off between the second placed South American and African teams, against Brazil, during the qualifications for the 2008 Olympics.
