= Damaris Quélez =

Salvadoran footballer (born 1990)

Personal information
- Full name: Damaris Beatriz Quélez Jiménez
- Date of birth: 14 August 1990 (age 36)
- Place of birth: El Salvador
- Position: Forward

Team information
- Current team: Platense

Senior career*
Years	Team	Apps	(Gls)
2012-2015	Jutiapanecas	30	(64)
2017-2018	Sacachispas	11	(24)
2019	Municipal Limeño	8	(34)
2020-2022	FAS	29	(64)
2022-2023	Santa Tecla	24	(67)
2023	Jocoro	21	(43)
2024-2026	Municipal Limeño	64	(122)
2026	Platense	11	(10)
Total		198	(428)

International career
2009	El Salvador U20	4	(1)
2011–	El Salvador	13	(15)
- * Club domestic league appearances and goals

Damaris Beatriz Quélez Jiménez (born 14 August 1990) is a Salvadoran footballer who plays as a forward for Platense and former El Salvador women's national team player.

== International goals ==
Scores and results list El Salvador's goal tally first.

No.	Date	Venue	Opponent	Score	Result	Competition	Ref.
1	2 October 2011	Estadio Cementos Progreso, Guatemala City, Guatemala	Costa Rica	1–0	2–6	2012 CONCACAF Women's Olympic Qualifying Tournament qualification	
2	4 October 2011	Estadio Cementos Progreso, Guatemala City, Guatemala	Nicaragua	2–1	3–1	2012 CONCACAF Women's Olympic Qualifying Tournament qualification	
3	6 October 2011	Estadio Cementos Progreso, Guatemala City, Guatemala	Honduras	1–0	6–1	2012 CONCACAF Women's Olympic Qualifying Tournament qualification	
4	6 October 2011	Estadio Cementos Progreso, Guatemala City, Guatemala	Honduras	3–0	6–1	2012 CONCACAF Women's Olympic Qualifying Tournament qualification	
5	6 October 2011	Estadio Cementos Progreso, Guatemala City, Guatemala	Honduras	4–1	6–1	2012 CONCACAF Women's Olympic Qualifying Tournament qualification	
6	6 March 2013	Estadio Ernesto Rohrmoser, San José, Costa Rica	Nicaragua	1–1	1–3	2013 Central American Games	

== See also ==
- List of El Salvador women's international footballers
