= Celeste Pelayes =

Guatemalan footballer

Personal information
- Full name: María Celeste Pelayes Guillén
- Date of birth: 26 December 1983 (age 42)
- Position: Forward

Senior career*
Years	Team	Apps	(Gls)
2012	Profut		

International career^{‡}
2012	Guatemala	2	(0)
- Guatemala (futsal)
- * Club domestic league appearances and goals ‡ National team caps and goals as of 24 January 2012

María Celeste Pelayes Guillén (born 26 December 1983), known as Celeste Pelayes, is a Guatemalan retired footballer who played as a forward. She has been a member of the Guatemala women's national team.

== International career ==
Pelayes capped for Guatemala at senior level during the 2012 CONCACAF Women's Olympic Qualifying Tournament.
