= Alejandra de León =

Guatemalan footballer

Personal information
- Full name: María Alejandra de León Guzmán
- Date of birth: 19 August 1983 (age 43)
- Position: Midfielder

Senior career*
Years	Team	Apps	(Gls)
2012	Profut		

International career^{‡}
2011–2012	Guatemala	6	(0)
- Guatemala (futsal)
- * Club domestic league appearances and goals ‡ National team caps and goals as of 24 January 2012

María Alejandra de León Guzmán (born 19 August 1983), known as Alejandra de León, is a Guatemalan retired footballer who played as a midfielder. She has been a member of the Guatemala women's national team.

== International career ==
De León capped for Guatemala at senior level during the 2012 CONCACAF Women's Olympic Qualifying Tournament (and its qualification).
