= Francisca González =

Salvadoran footballer (born 1993)

Personal information
- Full name: Francisca del Carmen González Campos
- Date of birth: 20 July 1993 (age 33)
- Place of birth: El Salvador
- Position: Midfielder

Team information
- Current team: FAS

International career^{‡}
Years	Team	Apps	(Gls)
2009	El Salvador U17	2	(5)
2010–2011	El Salvador U20	6	(2)
2010–	El Salvador	8	(6)
- ‡ National team caps and goals as of 15:54, 13 March 2015 (UTC)

Francisca del Carmen González Campos (born 20 July 1993) is a Salvadoran footballer who plays as a midfielder for CD FAS and the El Salvador women's national team.

== Club career ==
González has played for CD FAS in El Salvador.

== International goals ==
Scores and results list El Salvador's goal tally first.

No.	Date	Venue	Opponent	Score	Result	Competition
1	4 October 2011	Estadio Cementos Progreso, Guatemala City, Guatemala	Nicaragua	1–1	3–1	2012 CONCACAF Women's Olympic Qualifying Tournament qualification
2	4 October 2011	Estadio Cementos Progreso, Guatemala City, Guatemala	Nicaragua	3–1	3–1	2012 CONCACAF Women's Olympic Qualifying Tournament qualification
3	6 October 2011	Estadio Cementos Progreso, Guatemala City, Guatemala	Honduras	5–1	6–1	2012 CONCACAF Women's Olympic Qualifying Tournament qualification

== See also ==
- List of El Salvador women's international footballers
