= Roseleine Joseph =

Haitian footballer (born 1986)

Personal information
- Date of birth: 5 December 1986 (age 39)

Senior career*
Years	Team	Apps	(Gls)
2010	Aigle d'Or		

International career^{‡}
2011	Haiti	3	(3)
- * Club domestic league appearances and goals ‡ National team caps and goals as of 3 July 2011.

Roseleine Joseph (born 5 December 1986) is a Haitian former footballer. She has been a member of the Haiti women's national team.

== Club career ==
Joseph has played for Aigle d'Or in Haiti.

== International career ==
Joseph capped for Haiti at senior level during the 2012 CONCACAF Women's Olympic Qualifying Tournament qualification.

=== International goals ===
Scores and results list Haiti' goal tally first.

No.	Date	Venue	Opponent	Score	Result	Competition	Ref.
1	1 July 2011	Compleho Deportivo Guillermo Prospero Trinidad, Oranjestad, Aruba	Cuba	1–0	1–1	2012 CONCACAF Women's Olympic Qualifying Tournament qualification	
2	3 July 2011	Compleho Deportivo Guillermo Prospero Trinidad, Oranjestad, Aruba	Aruba	1–0	8–0	2012 CONCACAF Women's Olympic Qualifying Tournament qualification	
3	3 July 2011	Compleho Deportivo Guillermo Prospero Trinidad, Oranjestad, Aruba	Aruba	6–0	8–0	2012 CONCACAF Women's Olympic Qualifying Tournament qualification	
