= Yisel Rodríguez =

Cuban footballer (born 1989)

Personal information
- Full name: Yisel Rodríguez Llanes
- Date of birth: 30 January 1989 (age 37)
- Position: Midfielder

Senior career*
Years	Team	Apps	(Gls)
2012	La Habana		

International career^{‡}
2010–2012	Cuba	10	(0)
- * Club domestic league appearances and goals ‡ National team caps and goals as of 22 January 2012

Yisel Rodríguez Llanes (born 30 January 1989) is a Cuban former footballer who played as a midfielder. She capped for the Cuba women's national team until January 2012, when she defected while being in Vancouver, Canada during an international competitive tournament.

== International career ==
Rodríguez capped for Cuba at senior level during the 2010 CONCACAF Women's World Cup Qualifying qualification and the 2012 CONCACAF Women's Olympic Qualifying Tournament (and its qualification).
