= Mayra Pelayo-Bernal =

Mexican footballer (born 1997)

Personal information
- Full name: Mayra Alejandra Pelayo-Bernal
- Date of birth: 29 January 1997 (age 29)
- Place of birth: California, U.S.
- Height: 1.65 m (5 ft 5 in)
- Position: Winger

Team information
- Current team: Guadalajara
- Number: 13

College career
Years	Team	Apps	(Gls)
2015–2018	Florida Gators	84	(10)

Senior career*
Years	Team	Apps	(Gls)
2019–2020	C.D. Parquesol		
2021–2022	América	43	(5)
2023–2025	Tijuana	41	(10)
2026–	Guadalajara	0	(0)

International career^{‡}
2012	United States U-15		
2016	United States U-20		
2017	United States U-23		
2023–	Mexico	13	(2)
- * Club domestic league appearances and goals as of 29 February 2024 ‡ National team caps and goals as of 20 February 2025

Mayra Alejandra Pelayo-Bernal (born 29 January 1997) is a professional footballer who plays as a forward for Liga MX Femenil side Guadalajara. Born in the United States, she represents the Mexico national team.

== Career ==
In August 2021, she signed with América. In January 2023, she was announced as a player for Tijuana.

== International career ==
Previous to her senior international debut with Mexico, Pelayo-Bernal was part of the United States women's national soccer team youth program from 2012 to 2017, being part of the U-15, U-20, and U-23 national teams at different stages.

Pelayo-Bernal made her debut for the Mexico women's national team on 22 September 2023, during a 2024 CONCACAF W Gold Cup qualification match against Puerto Rico. She scored her first goal for the national team on 23 February 2024 in an 8–0 victory against the Dominican Republic in the group stage of the 2024 CONCACAF W Gold Cup. Three days later in the group stage's last game, Pelayo-Bernal scored a long-distance goal securing the national team's historic 2–0 victory over the United States. The goal won international praise for its skill and beauty, and was nominated for FIFA's 2024 Marta Award final vote for the world's best goal of 2024, placing fifth.

== International goals ==
No.	Date	Venue	Opponent	Score	Result	Competition
1.	23 February 2024	Dignity Health Sports Park, Carson, United States	Dominican Republic	8–0	8–0	2024 CONCACAF W Gold Cup
2.	26 February 2024	Dignity Health Sports Park, Carson, United States	United States	2–0	2–0	2024 CONCACAF W Gold Cup
