= 2012 CONCACAF Women's Olympic Qualifying Tournament qualification =

Association football competition

The 2012 CONCACAF Women's Olympic Qualifying Tournament qualification determined five of the eight teams for the final tournament.

== Tiebreakers ==
Per FIFA regulations, the group tiebreakers for all qualifying tournaments were:

- goal difference in all group matches
- greatest number of goals scored in all group matches
- If two or more teams are equal on the basis of the above criteria, their rankings shall be determined as follows:
  - greater number of points obtained in all group matches between the teams concerned
  - goal difference resulting from the group matches between the teams concerned
  - greater number of goals scored in all group matches between the teams concerned
  - play-off match on neutral ground (with extra time and penalty kicks, if necessary)

== Caribbean Zone ==
On 17 May 2011, CONCACAF announced the groups for the Caribbean qualifying. The group winners and the best runner-up will advance to the final qualifying tournament.

=== Group A ===
Played from June 29 – 3 July 2011 in Aruba. All times in UTC−4.

Pos	Team	Pld	W	D	L	GF	GA	GD	Pts	Qualification
1	Haiti	3	2	1	0	13	1	+12	7	Qualification to 2012 CONCACAF Olympic Qualifying
2	Cuba	3	2	1	0	10	1	+9	7	Qualification to 2012 CONCACAF Olympic Qualifying
3	Suriname	3	1	0	2	3	7	−4	3	
4	Aruba (H)	3	0	0	3	0	17	−17	0	

Source: CONCACAF
(H) Hosts
29 June 2011
18:00

Suriname	0–4	Haiti
	Report	Valentin 46', 85'; Merone 57'; Dolce 90'

Guillermo Prospero Trinidad Stadion, Oranjestad
Attendance: 500
Referee: Shane De Silva (Trinidad and Tobago)

29 June 2011
20:30

Aruba	0–6	Cuba
	Report	Gallardo 38', 56', 63', 74'; Galindo 55'; Pérez 85'

Guillermo Prospero Trinidad Stadion, Oranjestad
Attendance: 800
Referee: Shane De Silva (Trinidad and Tobago)

1 July 2011
18:00

Haiti	1–1	Cuba
Joseph 35'	Report	Gallardo 60'

Guillermo Prospero Trinidad Stadion, Oranjestad
Attendance: 800
Referee: Dianne Ferreira-James (Guyana)

1 July 2011
20:30

Aruba	0–3	Suriname
	Report	Smit 15'; Taweroe 45'; Saling 60'

Guillermo Prospero Trinidad Stadion, Oranjestad
Attendance: 800
Referee: Sabina Charles-Kirton (Saint Lucia)

3 July 2011
17:00

Cuba	3–0	Suriname
Galindo 18'; Pérez 72'; Calderón 90'	Report

Guillermo Prospero Trinidad Stadion, Oranjestad
Attendance: 100
Referee: Gillian Martindale (Barbados)

3 July 2011
19:30

Aruba	0–8	Haiti
	Report	Joseph 5', 69'; Borgella 17', 35', 76'; Dolce 32', 73'; Merone 49'

Guillermo Prospero Trinidad Stadion, Oranjestad
Attendance: 1,000
Referee: Shane De Silva (Trinidad and Tobago)

=== Group B ===
Played from 5–9 July 2011 in the Dominican Republic.

Pos	Team	Pld	W	D	L	GF	GA	GD	Pts	Qualification
1	Dominican Republic (H)	3	3	0	0	5	0	+5	9	Qualification to 2012 CONCACAF Olympic Qualifying
2	Trinidad and Tobago	3	2	0	1	19	3	+16	6	
3	Bermuda	3	1	0	2	6	6	0	3	
4	Dominica	3	0	0	3	1	22	−21	0	

Source: CONCACAF
(H) Hosts
5 July 2011
14:00

Trinidad and Tobago	5–1	Bermuda
Cordner 8'; Debesette 12'; Edwards 56'; Francois 58'; Forbes 67'	Report	Wade 30'

Estadio Panamericano, San Cristóbal
Attendance: 805
Referee: Gillian Martindale (Barbados)

5 July 2011
16:00

Dominican Republic	3–0	Dominica
Martínez 25'; Núñez 44'; Frías 70'	Report

Estadio Panamericano, San Cristóbal
Attendance: 805
Referee: Deborah Zebeda (Suriname)

7 July 2011
14:00

Dominica	1–14	Trinidad and Tobago
Esprit 62'	Report	Cordner 2', 32', 41', 54', 61', 64', 71', 73', 78'; Forbes 12', 76', 85'; McGee 22'; Lewis 39'

Estadio Panamericano, San Cristóbal
Attendance: 106
Referee: Cardella Samuels (Jamaica)

7 July 2011
16:00

Dominican Republic	1–0	Bermuda
Ubri 54'	Report

Estadio Panamericano, San Cristóbal
Attendance: 600
Referee: Irazema Aguillera (Cuba)

9 July 2011
14:00

Bermuda	5–0	Dominica
Bell 17', 85'; Wade 30'; Brangman 59'; Allen 81'	Report

Estadio Panamericano, San Cristóbal
Attendance: 100
Referee: Annia Navarrete (Cuba)

9 July 2011
16:00

Dominican Republic	1–0	Trinidad and Tobago
Ubri 51'	Report

Estadio Panamericano, San Cristóbal
Attendance: 875
Referee: Cardella Samuels (Jamaica)

=== Ranking of second-placed teams ===
Pos	Team	Pld	W	D	L	GF	GA	GD	Pts	Qualification
1	Cuba	3	2	1	0	10	1	+9	7	Qualification to 2012 CONCACAF Olympic Qualifying
2	Trinidad and Tobago	3	2	0	1	19	3	+16	6	

Source: CONCACAF

== Central American Zone ==
UNCAF's two slots were contested in one group of five teams. The top two advanced to the final qualifying tournament. The matches were held in Guatemala from September 30 to October 8, 2011.

Pos	Team	Pld	W	D	L	GF	GA	GD	Pts	Qualification
1	Costa Rica	4	4	0	0	20	4	+16	12	Qualification to 2012 CONCACAF Olympic Qualifying
2	Guatemala (H)	4	3	0	1	11	7	+4	9	Qualification to 2012 CONCACAF Olympic Qualifying
3	El Salvador	4	2	0	2	12	10	+2	6	
4	Honduras	4	1	0	3	3	13	−10	3	
5	Nicaragua	4	0	0	4	1	13	−12	0	

Source: CONCACAF
(H) Hosts
30 September 2011
16:00

Costa Rica	5–0	Nicaragua
Venegas 20', 35'; Campos 45'; L. Rodríguez 80'; Cruz 90'	Report

Estadio Cementos Progreso, Guatemala City
Attendance: 97
Referee: Cardella Samuels (Jamaica)

30 September 2011
18:30

Guatemala	3–1	Honduras
M. Monterroso 7'; Pineda 71'; Pérez 88'	Report	Umanzor 59'

Estadio Cementos Progreso, Guatemala City
Attendance: 518
Referee: Quetzalli Alvardo (Mexico)

2 October 2011
16:00

El Salvador	2–6	Costa Rica
Quélez 13'; Herrera 19'	Report	R. Rodríguez 22', 23'; Cruz 36'; Alvarado 50', 74'; Acosta 90'

Estadio Cementos Progreso, Guatemala City
Attendance: 58
Referee: Gillian Martindale (Barbados)

2 October 2011
18:30

Guatemala	4–0	Nicaragua
Pérez 6', 73'; Pineda 19'; C. Monterroso 78'	Report

Estadio Cementos Progreso, Guatemala City
Attendance: 830
Referee: Carol Anne Chenard (Canada)

4 October 2011
16:00

Nicaragua	1–3	El Salvador
Solís 10'	Report	González 37', 55'; Quélez 41'

Estadio Cementos Progreso, Guatemala City
Attendance: 246
Referee: Cardella Samuels (Jamaica)

4 October 2011
18:30

Costa Rica	4–0	Honduras
Cruz 4', 17'; Acosta 26'; R. Rodríguez 49'	Report

Estadio Cementos Progreso, Guatemala City
Attendance: 270
Referee: Lucila Venegas (Mexico)

6 October 2011
16:00

Honduras	1–6	El Salvador
Tejeda 18'	Report	Quélez 6', 11', 22'; Herrera 8'; González 52'; Ramírez 90+1'

Estadio Cementos Progreso, Guatemala City
Attendance: 378
Referee: Gillian Martindale (Barbados)

6 October 2011
18:30

Guatemala	2–5	Costa Rica
Martínez 60', 74'	Report	R. Rodríguez 49', 63', 78'; Cruz 72'; Acosta 79'

Estadio Cementos Progreso, Guatemala City
Attendance: 1116
Referee: Lucila Venegas (Mexico)

8 October 2011
16:00

Nicaragua	0–1	Honduras
	Report	Caballero 70'

Estadio Cementos Progreso, Guatemala City
Referee: Quetzalli Alvardo (Mexico)

8 October 2011
18:30

Guatemala	2–1	El Salvador
Martínez 4'; Pérez 81'	Report	Herrera 11'

Estadio Cementos Progreso, Guatemala City
Attendance: 1307
Referee: Carol Anne Chenard (Canada)
