= Yutmila Galindo =

Cuban footballer (born 1978)

Personal information
- Full name: Yutmila Galindo Rodríguez
- Date of birth: 15 March 1978 (age 48)
- Position: Defender

Senior career*
Years	Team	Apps	(Gls)
2012	Artemisa		

International career^{‡}
2010–2012	Cuba	11	(2)
- * Club domestic league appearances and goals ‡ National team caps and goals as of 23 January 2012

Yutmila Galindo Rodríguez (born 15 March 1978) is a Cuban former footballer who played as a defender. She capped for the Cuba women's national team.

== International career ==
Galindo capped for Cuba at senior level during the 2010 CONCACAF Women's World Cup Qualifying qualification and the 2012 CONCACAF Women's Olympic Qualifying Tournament (and its qualification).
