= Vanessa Kara =

Dominican footballer (born 1996)

Personal information
- Full name: Vanessa Michelle Kara González
- Date of birth: 27 November 1996 (age 29)
- Place of birth: Burlington, New Jersey, U.S.
- Height: 1.63 m (5 ft 4 in)
- Position: Forward

Youth career
- PDA Force

College career
Years	Team	Apps	(Gls)
2015–2017	Drexel Dragons	53	(22)
2019	Florida Gators	20	(10)

Senior career*
Years	Team	Apps	(Gls)
2020	TiPS	9	(2)
2021	Racing Louisville	1	(0)

International career^{‡}
2021–	Dominican Republic	4	(3)
- * Club domestic league appearances and goals as of 03:50, 16 April 2021 (UTC) ‡ National team caps and goals as of 22 October 2021.

Vanessa Michelle Kara González (born 27 November 1996) is a professional footballer who plays as a forward. Born in the United States, she plays for the Dominican Republic women's national team.

== Early life ==
Born in Burlington, New Jersey to a Dominican mother, Kara began playing soccer at the Bridle Club in her hometown, playing alongside her brothers. She soon joined the PDA Fusion, part of the Players Development Academy. During her club and her high school career at Moorestown Friends School, Kara suffered two ACL tears in both knees. During her senior year of high school, Kara committed to playing for the Drexel Dragons of Drexel University.

During her first season with Drexel Dragons, she recorded a team record 11 goals in 18 matches, and was named the 2015 CAA Rookie of the Year. In her sophomore year, Kara scored 6 goals and contributed 5 assists as she earned All-CAA First Team honors. During her final season with the Dragons, she scored 5 goals. Prior to the 2017 playoffs, Kara tore her ACL again and had to red shirt during what would have been her senior year.

In 2019, Kara left Drexel University, and joined the Florida Gators of the University of Florida. One of her former coaches had recommended Kara to Gators head coach Becky Burleigh. During her only season with the Florida Gators, Kara scored a team leading 10 goals, tied for 5th in the Southeastern Conference.

== Club career ==
On 16 January 2020, Kara was eligible for selection in the NWSL College Draft but was not selected. The day after the draft, Kara received a call from North Carolina Courage head coach Paul Riley to join the team for preseason. Later that year, Kara joined Kansallinen Liiga club TiPS. She made her debut for the side on 22 August 2020 against Åland United, starting in a 3–0 defeat. Kara then scored her first goal on 5 September against PK-35, scoring the only goal in a 1–0 victory.

=== Racing Louisville ===
On 5 April 2021, after training with them during preseason, Kara returned to the United States and joined National Women's Soccer League club Racing Louisville. She made her professional debut for the club on 15 April 2021 in the NWSL Challenge Cup against the Washington Spirit, coming on as an 89th-minute substitute in a 1–0 defeat.

== International career ==
Kara made her senior debut for the Dominican Republic on 22 October 2021, starting in a 3–0 friendly home win over Bolivia. During the match, she scored a brace and assisted the remaining goal.

== Career statistics ==
As of match played 15 April 2021

Appearances and goals by club, season and competition
Club	Season	League			Cup		Continental		Total	
Club	Season	Division	Apps	Goals	Apps	Goals	Apps	Goals	Apps	Goals
TiPS	2020	Kansallinen Liiga	9	2	0	0	—	—	9	2
Racing Louisville	2021	National Women's Soccer League	1	0	2	0	—	—	3	0
Career total			10	2	2	0	0	0	12	2

== Honours ==
Individual

- 2015 CAA Rookie of the Year
