= Nadia Valentin =

Haitian footballer (born 1987)

Personal information
- Date of birth: 10 April 1987 (age 39)
- Place of birth: Haiti
- Position: Midfielder

Senior career*
Years	Team	Apps	(Gls)
- Valentina

International career^{‡}
2010–2012	Haiti	17	(4)
- * Club domestic league appearances and goals ‡ National team caps and goals as of 23 January 2012.

Nadia Valentin (born 10 April 1987) is a Haitian former footballer who played as a midfielder. She has been a member of the Haiti women's national team.

== Club career ==
Valentin has played for Valentina FC in Haiti.

== International career ==
Valentin capped for Haiti at senior level during the 2010 Central American and Caribbean Games and the 2012 CONCACAF Women's Olympic Qualifying Tournament (including its qualification).

=== International goals ===
Scores and results list Haiti's goal tally first

No.	Date	Venue	Opponent	Score	Result	Competition	Ref.
1	1 August 2010	Estadio Metropolitano de Mérida, Mérida, Venezuela	Trinidad and Tobago	1–0	1–0	2010 Central American and Caribbean Games	
2	29 June 2011	Trinidad Stadium, Oranjestad, Aruba	Suriname	1–0	4–0	2012 CONCACAF Women's Olympic Qualifying Tournament qualification	
3	29 June 2011	Trinidad Stadium, Oranjestad, Aruba	Suriname	3–0	4–0	2012 CONCACAF Women's Olympic Qualifying Tournament qualification	
4	23 January 2012	BC Place, Vancouver, Canada	Cuba	3–0	3–0	2012 CONCACAF Women's Olympic Qualifying Tournament	
