= Shunta Todd =

Bermudian cricketer (born 1988)

Personal information
- Born: July 31, 1988 (age 38)
- Role: all-rounder

International information
- National side: Bermuda
- Source: Cricinfo, 1 December 2017

Shunta Todd (born 31 July 1988) is a Bermudian woman cricketer. She played for Bermuda at the 2008 Women's Cricket World Cup Qualifier.
