= Saudy Rosales =

Costa Rican footballer (born 1985)

Personal information
- Full name: Saudy Rosales Beneditt
- Date of birth: 13 October 1985 (age 41)
- Position: Forward

Senior career*
Years	Team	Apps	(Gls)
- Carrillo

International career^{‡}
2011–2012	Costa Rica	6	(1)
- * Club domestic league appearances and goals ‡ National team caps and goals as of 27 January 2012

Saudy Rosales Beneditt (born 13 October 1985) is a Costa Rican former footballer who has played as a forward. She has been a member of the Costa Rica women's national team.

== International goals ==
Scores and results list Costa Rica's goal tally first

No.	Date	Venue	Opponent	Score	Result	Competition	Ref.
1	19 January 2012	BC Place, Vancouver, Canada	Cuba	1–0	2–0	2012 CONCACAF Women's Olympic Qualifying Tournament	
