= Elizabeth Martínez (footballer) =

Dominican Republic footballer

Personal information
- Full name: Johanna Elizabeth Santelis Martínez
- Date of birth: 3 October 1989 (age 37)
- Place of birth: Dominican Republic
- Position: Midfielder

Team information
- Current team: Bob Soccer FC

Senior career*
| Years | Team | Apps | (Gls) |
- La Romana
- Tiki Taka FC
- Bob Soccer FC

International career^{‡}
| 2004 | Dominican Republic U19 | | |
| 2005 | Dominican Republic U20 | 2+ | (2) |
| 2007– | Dominican Republic | 8+ | (6) |
- * Club domestic league appearances and goals ‡ National team caps and goals as of 24 January 2012

Johanna Elizabeth Santelis Martínez (born 3 October 1989), known as Elizabeth Martínez, is a Dominican footballer who plays as a midfielder for Bob Soccer FC and the Dominican Republic women's national team.

== Club career ==
Martínez has played for La Romana, Tiki Taka FC and Bob Soccer FC in the Dominican Republic.

== International career ==
Martínez represented the Dominican Republic at the 2004 CONCACAF U-19 Women's Qualifying Tournament and the 2006 CONCACAF Women's U-20 Championship qualification. At senior level, she capped during two CONCACAF Women's Olympic Qualifying Tournament qualifications (2008 and 2012), the 2010 CONCACAF Women's World Cup Qualifying qualification and the 2012 CONCACAF Women's Olympic Qualifying Tournament.
