= Safia Abdul Rahman =

Ghanaian footballer

Personal information
- Date of birth: 5 May 1986 (age 40)
- Position: Forward

Senior career*
Years	Team	Apps	(Gls)
- Ghatel Ladies

International career
- Ghana
- * Club domestic league appearances and goals

Safia Abdul Rahman (born 5 May 1986) is a Ghanaian footballer who played as a forward for the Ghana women's national team. In November 2016, she was named the captain of the Black Queens for the Women's Africa Cup of Nations in Cameroon. She competed at the 2007 FIFA Women's World Cup, in matches against Norway, Canada and Australia. She also competed four times in the Women's Africa Cup of Nations (WAFCON) in 2008, 2010, 2014 and in 2016. She is retired from official competition.

At the club level, she played for Ghatel Ladies in Ghana.
