= Julieth Arias =

Costa Rican footballer (born 1990)

Personal information
- Full name: Julieth de los Ángeles Arias Gutiérrez
- Date of birth: 6 December 1990 (age 35)
- Position: Goalkeeper

Senior career*
Years	Team	Apps	(Gls)
- ADF San José

International career^{‡}
2011–2013	Costa Rica	7	(0)
- * Club domestic league appearances and goals ‡ National team caps and goals as of 15 March 2013

Julieth de los Ángeles Arias Gutiérrez (born 6 December 1990) is a Costa Rican footballer who plays as a goalkeeper. She has been a member of the Costa Rica women's national team. Arias also works as a physical education teacher.
