= Anisa Guajardo =

American-born Mexican footballer (born 1991)

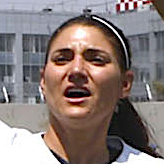
- Football player Anisa Guajardo on 14 March 2020.

Personal information
- Full name: Anisa Raquel Guajardo Braff
- Date of birth: 10 March 1991 (age 35)
- Place of birth: Fresno, California, United States
- Height: 1.67 m (5 ft 6 in)
- Position: Forward

Youth career
- 2001–2003: Stanford Club
- 2003–2006: California Odyssey
- 2006–2012: East Fresno United Fusion
- 2005–2009: Buchanan Bears

College career
Years	Team	Apps	(Gls)
2009–2012	Pepperdine Waves	61	(25)

Senior career*
Years	Team	Apps	(Gls)
2011–2012	Pali Blues	0	(0)
2013	Boston Breakers	0	(0)
2015	Heidelberg United	4	(3)
2015–2016	Melbourne City	7	(0)
2017	Valur	16	(5)
2018	Sundsvalls DFF	25	(15)
2020	UNAM	21	(3)
2021	Pachuca	7	(0)
2021	León	14	(4)

International career^{‡}
2008	Mexico U20		
2011–2015	Mexico	13	(4)

Managerial career
- 2019: Fresno State Bulldogs (assistant)
- * Club domestic league appearances and goals as of 1 February 2020 ‡ National team caps and goals as of 18 June 2015

Anisa Raquel Guajardo Braff (born 10 March 1991) is a former professional footballer who played as a forward. Born in the United States, she represented the Mexico national team.

== Early life ==
Guajardo was born in Fresno, California to parents Ellen Braff-Guajardo and Santiago Guajardo. She has one sister named Milena.

Guajardo attended Buchanan High School in Clovis, California. As a four-year varsity midfielder/forward, she scored 54 career goals and provided 20 assists. She was awarded an All-American honorable mention selection by ESPN RISE after her senior year. During her time at Buchanan, she helped lead the school to four consecutive CIF Central Section championships and three Tri-River Athletic Conference (TRAC) titles. In 2009, the team reached the finals of the CIF Southern California Regional Division I tournament, in addition to receiving a No. 6 national ranking and No. 2 ranking in California. In 2008, she was named a member of the ESPY Team of the Year.

She played for East Fresno United Fusion from 2006 to 2012 and helped the team reach the 2008 State Cup semi-finals.

She also competed for Stanford Club from 2001 to 2003 and California Odyssey from 2003 to 2006 serving as team captain on both teams.

=== Pepperdine University ===
Guajardo attended Pepperdine University where she majored in psychology with a minor in sports medicine. Ranks fourth in Pepperdine history with 27 career goals; ranks fifth in total points with 68; ranks fourth in career game-winning goals with nine.

== Club career ==
=== Pali Blues ===
Guajardo played for the Pali Blues from 2011 to 2012. In May 2011, she was named to the W-League Team of the Week.

=== Boston Breakers ===
In January 2013, Guajardo was included in a list of 55 players from the U.S., Canada, and Mexico national teams that were allocated to the eight teams in the new National Women's Soccer League. She was allocated to the Boston Breakers but, after not playing in 2013, the FMF dropped her allocation.

=== Houston Dash ===
In early 2014, Guajardo was a trialist for the Houston Dash, also of the NWSL. She was brought in as a substitute during two preseason games, but was ultimately not signed by the club.

=== Australia ===
In May 2015, Guajardo flew to Australia and joined Heidelberg United. She scored 3 goals in the 4 games she played for the club. In October 2015, Guajardo joined W-League club Melbourne City for their inaugural season in the 2015–16 W-League season. In November 2016, it was announced she was released by the club.

=== Valur ===
On 4 February 2017, Icelandic side Valur announced Guajardo as one of their signings for that year's season.

=== Sundsvalls DFF ===
In February 2018, Guajardo signed with Sundsvalls DFF in Sweden.

== International career ==
Guajardo competed with the U-17 Mexican Women's National Team at the CONCACAF U-17 Championship in Trinidad & Tobago in July 2008. In August 2008 she joined the U-20 Mexican Women's National Team. Her first senior Mexican Women's National Team call up was in November 2011 and she received her first cap on 20 November 2011 versus France. On 22 January 2012 during the CONCACAF Women's Olympic Qualifying Tournament she earned a hat trick against the Dominican Republic. Guajardo participated in the 2013 Algarve Cup.
