= Wendy Pineda =

Guatemalan footballer

Personal information
- Full name: Wendy Omara Pineda Valdez
- Date of birth: 9 July 1989 (age 37)
- Position: Forward

Senior career*
Years	Team	Apps	(Gls)
2010	Champions		

International career^{‡}
2010–2012	Guatemala	17	(8)
- * Club domestic league appearances and goals ‡ National team caps and goals as of 24 January 2012

Wendy Omara Pineda Valdez (born 9 July 1989) is a Guatemalan retired footballer who played as a forward. She has been a member of the Guatemala women's national team.

== International career ==
Pineda capped for Guatemala at senior level during the 2010 CONCACAF Women's World Cup Qualifying (and its qualification) and the 2012 CONCACAF Women's Olympic Qualifying Tournament (and its qualification).
