= Yendry Villalobos =

Costa Rican footballer (born 1984)

Personal information
- Full name: Yendry María Villalobos Varela
- Date of birth: 27 May 1984 (age 42)
- Position: Midfielder

Senior career*
Years	Team	Apps	(Gls)
- Arenal Coronado

International career^{‡}
2011–2012	Costa Rica	7	(0)
- * Club domestic league appearances and goals ‡ National team caps and goals as of 24 January 2012

Yendry María Villalobos Varela (born 27 May 1984) is a Costa Rican former footballer who has played as a midfielder. She has been a member of the Costa Rica women's national team.
