= Gloria Foriwa =

Ghanaian footballer

Personal information
- Full name: Gloria Adwoa Foriwa
- Date of birth: 11 May 1981 (age 45)
- Position: Forward

Senior career*
Years	Team	Apps	(Gls)
- Ghatel Ladies

International career^{‡}
	Ghana	6	(1)
- * Club domestic league appearances and goals ‡ National team caps and goals as of 10 September 2007 (before the 2007 FIFA Women's World Cup)

Gloria Adwoa Foriwa (born 11 May 1981) is a Ghanaian footballer who played as a forward for the Ghana women's national football team. She was part of the team at the 2003 FIFA Women's World Cup and 2007 FIFA Women's World Cup. On club level she played for Ghatel Ladies in Ghana.
