= Mariela Campos (footballer, born 1991) =

Costa Rican footballer (born 1991)

Personal information
- Full name: Mariela Campos Alfaro
- Date of birth: 4 January 1991 (age 35)
- Height: 1.68 m (5 ft 6 in)
- Position: Midfielder

International career^{‡}
Years	Team	Apps	(Gls)
2008–2018	Costa Rica	8	(0)
- ‡ National team caps and goals as of 15 July 2019

Mariela Campos Alfaro (born 4 January 1991) is a Costa Rican international footballer who plays as a midfielder for the Costa Rica women's national football team.

== Career ==
She appeared in 2018 CONCACAF Women's U-20 Championship, and in one match for Costa Rica at the 2018 CONCACAF Women's Championship.
