= 2012 CONCACAF Women's Olympic Qualifying Tournament =

Tournament details
- Host country: Canada
- Dates: 19–29 January
- Teams: 8 (from 1 confederation)
- Venue: 1 (in 1 host city)

Final positions
- Champions: United States (3rd title)
- Runners-up: Canada

Tournament statistics
- Matches played: 15
- Goals scored: 81 (5.4 per match)
- Attendance: 120,898 (8,060 per match)
- Top scorer: (Canada) Christine Sinclair (9 goals)

The 2012 CONCACAF Women's Olympic Qualifying Tournament was an association football competition used to determine the two participants who would compete at the 2012 Summer Olympics. It was held at BC Place in Vancouver, British Columbia, Canada, from January 19–29, 2012.

== Qualification ==
Thirteen teams, eight from the Caribbean and five from Central America, competed to join automatic qualifiers Canada, Mexico and the United States in the eight-team final tournament.

Caribbean qualification took place as two groups of four teams that competed from June 29 to July 9. Cuba and Haiti qualified from group A with seven points each, and were joined by the Dominican Republic from group B who won their group with nine points.

UNCAF's two slots were determined by a five-team group that competed from September 30 to October 8. Costa Rica won the group without dropping any points, and were joined by Guatemala who only lost to Costa Rica.

== Group stage ==
Draw for the group stage was held on October 24, with schedules announced two days later.

The United States' 14–0 victory over the Dominican Republic on January 20 set a tournament record for the largest margin of victory.

Times listed are Pacific Standard Time (PST) – UTC−8.

=== Group A ===
| Pos | Team | Pld | W | D | L | GF | GA | GD | Pts | Qualification |
|---|---|---|---|---|---|---|---|---|---|---|
| 1 | Canada (H) | 3 | 3 | 0 | 0 | 13 | 1 | +12 | 9 | Advance to knockout stage |
| 2 | Costa Rica | 3 | 2 | 0 | 1 | 5 | 5 | 0 | 6 | Advance to knockout stage |
| 3 | Haiti | 3 | 1 | 0 | 2 | 3 | 8 | −5 | 3 | |
| 4 | Cuba | 3 | 0 | 0 | 3 | 0 | 7 | −7 | 0 | |

Source: CONCACAF
(H) Hosts
January 19, 2012
17:00

| Costa Rica | 2–0 | Cuba |
|---|---|---|
| Rosales 11'; Acosta 55' | Report |

BC Place, Vancouver
Attendance: 7,627
Referee: Quetzali Alvarado (Mexico)
January 19, 2012
19:30

| Canada | 6–0 | Haiti |
|---|---|---|
| Julien 7'; Sinclair 25', 44', 56', 86' (pen.); Parker 90+2' | Report |

BC Place, Vancouver
Attendance: 7,627
Referee: Kari Seitz (United States)

January 21, 2012
17:00

| Haiti | 0–2 | Costa Rica |
|---|---|---|
| | Report | Acosta 49', 57' |

BC Place, Vancouver
Attendance: 1,500
Referee: Margaret Domka (United States)
January 21, 2012
19:30

| Canada | 2–0 | Cuba |
|---|---|---|
| Sinclair 17' (pen.); Tancredi 24' | Report |

BC Place, Vancouver
Attendance: 12,000
Referee: Gillian Martindale (Barbados)

January 23, 2012
17:00

| Cuba | 0–3 | Haiti |
|---|---|---|
| | Report | Boulos 72'; Pierre-Louis 76'; Valentin 83' |

BC Place, Vancouver
Attendance: 1,500
Referee: Alicia Villatoro (Guatemala)
January 23, 2012
19:30

| Canada | 5–1 | Costa Rica |
|---|---|---|
| Sinclair 6', 45'; Schmidt 10'; Kyle 19'; Ugalde 50' (o.g.) | Report | Barrantes 89' |

BC Place, Vancouver
Attendance: 8,105
Referee: Kari Seitz (United States)

=== Group B ===
| Pos | Team | Pld | W | D | L | GF | GA | GD | Pts | Qualification |
|---|---|---|---|---|---|---|---|---|---|---|
| 1 | United States | 3 | 3 | 0 | 0 | 31 | 0 | +31 | 9 | Advance to knockout stage |
| 2 | Mexico | 3 | 2 | 0 | 1 | 12 | 4 | +8 | 6 | Advance to knockout stage |
| 3 | Guatemala | 3 | 1 | 0 | 2 | 6 | 18 | −12 | 3 | |
| 4 | Dominican Republic | 3 | 0 | 0 | 3 | 0 | 27 | −27 | 0 | |

Source: CONCACAF
January 20, 2012
17:00

| Mexico | 5–0 | Guatemala |
|---|---|---|
| Díaz 12'; Domínguez 24', 44', 67' (pen.); Garza 38' | Report |

BC Place, Vancouver
Referee: Dianne Ferreira-James (Guyana)
January 20, 2012
19:30

| Dominican Republic | 0–14 | United States |
|---|---|---|
| | Report | Wambach 1', 19'; Lloyd 4'; Buehler 7'; O'Reilly 17', 32', 78'; Heath 30'; Rodriguez 46', 48', 58', 70', 75'; Cheney 64' |

BC Place, Vancouver
Attendance: 6,321
Referee: Cardella Samuels (Jamaica)

January 22, 2012
14:00

| Mexico | 7–0 | Dominican Republic |
|---|---|---|
| Saucedo 21'; Díaz 27'; Ruiz 38', 71'; Guajardo 49', 62', 75' | Report |

BC Place, Vancouver
Attendance: 1,500
Referee: Maria Flores (Costa Rica)
January 22, 2012
16:30

| United States | 13–0 | Guatemala |
|---|---|---|
| Wambach 12', 15'; Cheney 25'; Rodriguez 29'; Lloyd 33'; Lindsey 34'; Leroux 48', 50', 57', 70', 87'; Rapinoe 75'; Morgan 83' | Report |

BC Place, Vancouver
Attendance: 6,738
Referee: Irasema Aguilera (Cuba)

January 24, 2012
17:00

| Guatemala | 6–0 | Dominican Republic |
|---|---|---|
| Pineda 2', 5', 29'; Monterroso 9', 90+1'; Martínez 53' | Report |

BC Place, Vancouver
Attendance: 2,000
Referee: Cardella Samuels (Jamaica)
January 24, 2012
19:30

| United States | 4–0 | Mexico |
|---|---|---|
| Lloyd 8', 57', 86'; O'Reilly 9' | Report |

BC Place, Vancouver
Attendance: 7,599
Referee: Carol Ann Chenard (Canada)

== Knockout stage ==
=== Bracket ===
Semi-finals
January 27 – Vancouver
Canada | 3
Mexico | 1
January 27 – Vancouver
United States | 3
Costa Rica | 0

Final
January 29 – Vancouver
Canada | 0
United States | 4

=== Semi-finals ===
January 27, 2012
17:00

| United States | 3–0 | Costa Rica |
|---|---|---|
| Heath 16'; Lloyd 72'; Morgan 89' | Report |

BC Place, Vancouver
Attendance: 10,000
Referee: Irasema Aguilera (Cuba)
January 27, 2012
20:00

| Canada | 3–1 | Mexico |
|---|---|---|
| Sinclair 15', 76'; Tancredi 23' | Report | Pérez 67' |

BC Place, Vancouver
Attendance: 22,954
Referee: Dianne Ferreira-James (Guyana)

=== Final ===
The Canada versus USA Final set a record for CONCACAF Women's Olympic qualification with 25,427 in attendance, the second time the record was broken this tournament. Previously, the Canada versus Mexico semifinal set the record with 22,954 spectators.

January 29, 2012
17:00

| Canada | 0–4 | United States |
|---|---|---|
| | Report | Morgan 4', 56'; Wambach 24', 28' |

BC Place, Vancouver
Attendance: 25,427
Referee: Quetzalli Godinez (Mexico)

== Goalscorers ==
9 goals

- (Canada) Christine Sinclair

6 goals

- (United States) Carli Lloyd
- (United States) Amy Rodriguez
- (United States) Abby Wambach

5 goals

- (United States) Sydney Leroux

4 goals

- (United States) Heather O'Reilly
- (United States) Alex Morgan

3 goals

- (Costa Rica) Wendy Acosta
- (Guatemala) Wendy Pineda
- (Mexico) Maribel Dominguez
- (Mexico) Anisa Guajardo

2 goals

- (Canada) Melissa Tancredi
- (Guatemala) Maria Monterroso
- (Mexico) Marylin Diaz
- (Mexico) Jennifer Ruiz
- (United States) Lauren Cheney
- (United States) Tobin Heath

1 goal

- (Canada) Christina Julien
- (Canada) Kaylyn Kyle
- (Canada) Kelly Parker
- (Canada) Sophie Schmidt
- (Costa Rica) Fernanda Barrantes
- (Costa Rica) Saudy Rosales
- (Guatemala) Ana Lucía Martínez
- (Haiti) Kimberly Boulos
- (Haiti) Manoucheka Pierre-Louis
- (Haiti) Nadia Valentin
- (Mexico) Dinora Garza
- (Mexico) Verónica Pérez
- (Mexico) Luz del Rosario Saucedo
- (United States) Rachel Buehler
- (United States) Lori Lindsey
- (United States) Megan Rapinoe

Own goal

- (Costa Rica) Marianne Ugalde (playing against Canada)

== See also ==
- Football at the 2012 Summer Olympics – Women's tournament
- 2012 CONCACAF Men's Olympic Qualifying Tournament
