= 2025 UNCAF Women's Interclub Championship =

Women's football tournament

UNCAF Women's Interclub Championship 2025
Copa Interclubes Femenina de UNCAF 2025

Tournament details
- Host country: Panama
- City: Panama City
- Dates: 17–23 July 2025
- Teams: 8 (from 8 associations)
- Venue: 1 (in 1 host city)

Final positions
- Champions: (Costa Rica) LD Alajuelense (3rd title)
- Runners-up: (Nicaragua) Real Estelí
- Third place: (Honduras) CDF Under
- Fourth place: (El Salvador) Alianza

Tournament statistics
- Matches played: 16
- Goals scored: 52 (3.25 per match)
- Top scorer(s): (El Salvador) Paola Calderón (Puerto Rico) Ángela Díaz; Doriana Aguilar (Honduras) Laura Canales (3 goals each)

The 2025 UNCAF Women's Interclub Championship (Spanish: Copa Interclubes de la Uncaf Femenino 2025) is the 8th edition of the UNCAF Women's Interclub Championship, an international club women's association football competition organized by the Central American Football Union (UNCAF) for clubs affiliated with its member associations. The tournament will be played in Panama from 17 to 23 July 2025. The format remains unchanged from the last three editions, with eight teams competing across a group stage and knockout phase.

Defending champions Santa Fé, who won the 2024 title, will not be able to defend their trophy after failing to qualify, having not won the domestic competition in Panama.

== Teams ==
The tournament features clubs from each of the seven UNCAF member associations, along with an invited team from Puerto Rico, all of whom qualified based on sporting merit.

Association	Team	App.	Previous best performance
Belize	Sagitun Girlz FC	3rd	Eighth place (2023, 2024)
Costa Rica	LD Alajuelense	4th	Champions (2022, 2023)
El Salvador	Alianza FC	5th	Runners-up (2024)
Guatemala	CSD Municipal	1st	Debut
Honduras	CDF Under	2nd	Seventh place (2024)
Nicaragua	Real Estelí FC	2nd	Sixth place (2024)
Panama	Chorrillo FC	2nd	Group stage (2019)
Puerto Rico	Caribbean Stars	1st	Debut

== Group stage ==
In the group stage, the eight teams were divided into two groups of four. Each team played the others in its group in a round-robin format. Based on the final standings, teams advanced to the playoffs, with matchups determined by corresponding placements in the two groups.

=== Group A ===
Pos	Team	Pld	W	D	L	GF	GA	GD	Pts	Qualification
1	(Nicaragua) Real Estelí	3	3	0	0	8	0	+8	9	Final
2	(El Salvador) Alianza	3	1	1	1	6	6	0	4	Third place match
3	(Panama) Chorrillo (H)	3	1	1	1	5	6	−1	4	Fifth place match
4	(Belize) Sagitun Girlz	3	0	0	3	4	11	−7	0	Seventh place match

Source: UNCAF
(H) Hosts
July 17, 2025
09:15

Alianza (El Salvador)	0–2	(Nicaragua) Real Estelí
	Report	Arista 3'; Aguilar 47'

COS Sports Plaza, Panama City
Referee: Génesis De León (Guatemala)
July 17, 2025
15:15

Chorrillo (Panama)	3–2	(Belize) Sagitun Girlz
King 10'; K. Pérez 69', 71'	Report	Chacon 63'; Aranda 90+1'

COS Sports Plaza, Panama City

July 19, 2025
09:15

Sagitun Girlz (Belize)	2–4	(El Salvador) Alianza
Brown 5'; Ortiz 81' (pen.)	Report	Ulloa 6'; Calderón 20', 37'; Webb 48'

COS Sports Plaza, Panama City
Referee: Karim Molina (Panama)
July 19, 2025
14:00

Chorrillo (Panama)	0–2	(Nicaragua) Real Estelí
	Report	Aguilar 45'; Flores 77'

Yappy Park, Panama City
Referee: Ximena Márquez (Mexico)

July 21, 2025
09:15

Sagitun Girlz (Belize)	0–4	(Nicaragua) Real Estelí
		Sandí 1', 37'; Picado 7'; Talavera 47'

COS Sports Plaza, Panama City
Referee: Yari Aguilar (Guatemala)
July 21, 2025
15:15

Chorrillo (Panama)	2–2	(El Salvador) Alianza
Camarena 57'; Sáenz 74' (pen.)		Calderón 13'; Webb 27'

COS Sports Plaza, Panama City
Referee: Génesis De León (Guatemala)

=== Group B ===
Pos	Team	Pld	W	D	L	GF	GA	GD	Pts	Qualification
1	(Costa Rica) LD Alajuelense	3	3	0	0	7	1	+6	9	Final
2	(Honduras) CDF Under	3	1	1	1	5	4	+1	4	Third place match
3	(Guatemala) CSD Municipal	3	1	1	1	2	2	0	4	Fifth place match
4	(Puerto Rico) Caribbean Stars	3	0	0	3	2	9	−7	0	Seventh place match

Source: UNCAF
July 17, 2025
09:00

CSD Municipal (Guatemala)	1–0	(Puerto Rico) Caribbean Stars
Edwards 66'	Report

Yappy Park, Panama City
Referee: Mirian León (El Salvador)
July 17, 2025
15:00

LD Alajuelense (Costa Rica)	2–0	(Honduras) CDF Under
Mesén 40'; Varela 89'	Report

Yappy Park, Panama City
Referee: Yatzuri Gómez (Panama)

July 19, 2025
09:00

CDF Under (Honduras)	1–1	(Guatemala) CSD Municipal
Calix 72'		Fernández 88'

Yappy Park, Panama City
Referee: Paula Amaya (El Salvador)
July 19, 2025
17:00

Caribbean Stars (Puerto Rico)	1–4	(Costa Rica) LD Alajuelense
DiGenova 84'	Report	Rangel 11', 61'; Varela 21'; Villanueva 32'

COS Sports Plaza, Panama City
Referee: Belkis Flores (Honduras)

July 21, 2025
09:00

Caribbean Stars (Puerto Rico)	1–4	(Honduras) CDF Under
Díaz 47'		Arias 2'; Haylock 18'; Canales 49' (pen.); Torres 84'

Yappy Park, Panama City
Referee: Yatzuri Gómez (Panama)
July 21, 2025
15:00

LD Alajuelense (Costa Rica)	1–0	(Guatemala) CSD Municipal
Chinchilla 28'

Yappy Park, Panama City
Referee: Merlin Soto (Honduras)

== Playoff stage ==
=== Seventh place match ===
July 23, 2025
09:00

Caribbean Stars (Puerto Rico)	4–3	(Belize) Sagitun Girlz
Díaz 7', 33'; Cabrera 85'; DiGenova 89'		Velasquez 41' (pen.); Pérez 50'; Chacon 70'

Yappy Park, Panama City
Referee: Karim Molina (Panama)

=== Fifth place match ===
July 23, 2025
15:00

Chorrillo (Panama)	3–1	(Guatemala) CSD Municipal
Magallón 29'; King 73'; Camarena 78'		Fernández 81'

Yappy Park, Panama City
Referee: Paula Amaya (El Salvador)

=== Third place match ===
July 23, 2025
09:15

CDF Under (Honduras)	2–0	(El Salvador) Alianza
Canales 41', 42'

COS Sports Plaza, Panama City
Referee: Ximena Márquez (Mexico)

=== Final ===
July 23, 2025
15:15

Real Estelí (Nicaragua)	1–1	(Costa Rica) LD Alajuelense
Aguilar 50'		Villalobos 22' (pen.)
Penalties
Cruz (penalty scored); Silva (penalty scored); Arista (penalty missed); Picado (penalty missed)	2–4	(penalty scored) Oporta; (penalty scored) Valenciano; (penalty scored) Guillén; (penalty scored) Pinell

COS Sports Plaza, Panama City
Referee: Merlin Soto (Honduras)

Real Estelí	LD Alajuelense

GK	24	(United States) Mariah Scott
MF	2	(Nicaragua) Sheyla Flores (c)
DF	3	(Nicaragua) Oisis Sediles	(red card) 19'
DF	5	(Nicaragua) Lisbeth Moreno
MF	6	(United States) Yaritza Arista
FW	7	(Costa Rica) Cristel Sandí
MF	8	(Nicaragua) Aryeri Mejia
DF	12	(Nicaragua) Nathaly Silva
FW	14	(Nicaragua) Doriana Aguilar
FW	19	(Nicaragua) Nuria Márquez
DF	21	(United States) Valeria Rios
Substitutes:
GK	1	(Nicaragua) Jessica Madriz
MF	4	(Nicaragua) Alys Cruz
DF	13	(Nicaragua) Alma Gutierrez
FW	15	(Nicaragua) Perla Garache
DF	16	(Nicaragua) Maria Corrales
FW	17	(Nicaragua) Heydin Picado
MF	20	(Nicaragua) Tania Centeno
FW	22	(Nicaragua) Eyding Talavera
Head coach:
(Nicaragua) Jaime Ruiz

GK	1	(Costa Rica) Noelia Bermúdez
FW	2	(Costa Rica) Yoanka Villanueva
DF	3	(Costa Rica) Gabriela Guillén
MF	8	(Costa Rica) Mariela Campos
WF	11	(Panama) Kenia Rangel (c)
DF	16	(Costa Rica) Marilenis Oporta
MF	18	(Costa Rica) Emilie Valenciano
MF	20	(Costa Rica) Alexandra Pinell
MF	35	(Costa Rica) María Paula Arce
DF	55	(Costa Rica) Fabiola Villalobos
FW	99	(Costa Rica) Sofía Varela
Substitutes:
GK	22	(Costa Rica) Dayana Pérez
DF	5	(Costa Rica) Keilyn Gómez
MF	7	(Costa Rica) Viviana Chinchilla
	9	(Costa Rica) Anna
DF	12	(Costa Rica) Katherine Arroyo
FW	19	(Costa Rica) Angela Mesén
MF	25	(Costa Rica) Sianyf Agüero
FW	26	(Costa Rica) Wyzangel López
Head coach:
(Costa Rica) Wílmer López

== Goalscorers ==
There have been 52 goals scored in 16 matches, for an average of xxx goals per match. last update July 23, 2025

Rank	Player	Team	Goals
1	(El Salvador) Paola Calderón	(El Salvador) Alianza	3
1	(Puerto Rico) Ángela Díaz	(Puerto Rico) Caribbean Stars	3
1	Doriana Aguilar	Real Estelí	3
1	(Honduras) Laura Canales (footballer)	(Honduras) CDF Under	3
5	Kayra Pérez	Chorrillo	2
5	(El Salvador) Paola Calderón	(El Salvador) Alianza	2
5	Cristel Sandí	Real Estelí	2
5	(El Salvador) Ashley Webb	(El Salvador) Alianza	2
5	Kenia Rangel	LD Alajuelense	2
5	Sofía Varela	LD Alajuelense	2
5	(Puerto Rico) Marissa DiGenova	(Puerto Rico) Caribbean Stars	2
5	Shante Chacon	Sagitun Girlz	2
5	Sherline King	Chorrillo	2
5	Shayari Camarena	Chorrillo	2
5	(Guatemala) Yaretzy Fernández	(Guatemala) CSD Municipal	2
17	Sheyla Flores	Real Estelí	1
17	Eyding Talavera	Real Estelí	1
17	Heydin Picado	Real Estelí	1
17	Jolene Aranda	Sagitun Girlz	1
17	Yaritza Arista	Real Estelí	1
17	Kenya Pérez	Sagitun Girlz	1
17	Khalydia Velasquez	Sagitun Girlz	1
17	Acacia Edwards	CSD Municipal	1
17	Yasselis Magallón	Chorrillo	1
17	Gloria Sáenz	Chorrillo	1
17	Angela Mesén	LD Alajuelense	1
17	Yoanka Villanueva	LD Alajuelense	1
17	Fabiola Villalobos	LD Alajuelense	1
17	(Belize) Jayda Brown	(Belize) Sagitun Girlz	1
17	(Belize) Solemar Ortiz	(Belize) Sagitun Girlz	1
17	(El Salvador) Gladys Ulloa	(El Salvador) Alianza	1
17	(Honduras) Larissa Arias	(Honduras) CDF Under	1
17	(Honduras) Karla Calix	(Honduras) CDF Under	1
17	(Honduras) Kendra Haylock	(Honduras) CDF Under	1
17	(Honduras) Heidy Torres	(Honduras) CDF Under	1
17	(Guatemala) Viviana Chinchilla	(Guatemala) CSD Municipal	1
17	(Puerto Rico) Saraira Cabrera	(Puerto Rico) Caribbean Stars	1
