= 2024 UNCAF Women's Interclub Championship =

Women's football tournament

Copa Interclubes Femenina de UNCAF 2024

Tournament details
- Host country: Guatemala
- City: Guatemala City
- Dates: 19–25 July 2024
- Teams: 8 (from 8 associations)
- Venue: 1 (in 1 host city)

Final positions
- Champions: (Panama) Santa Fé (1st title)
- Runners-up: (El Salvador) Alianza
- Third place: (Costa Rica) Alajuelense
- Fourth place: (Guatemala) Unifut

Tournament statistics
- Matches played: 20
- Goals scored: 57 (2.85 per match)
- Top scorer: (Puerto Rico) Cristina Torres (5 goals)

The 2024 UNCAF Women's Interclub Championship (Spanish: 2024 Copa Interclubes Femenina de UNCAF) is the Seventh edition of the UNCAF Women's Club Championship, Central America's premier women's club football organized by UNCAF. The tournament will be played in Guatemala City, Guatemala between 19 and 25 July 2024. Alajualense from Costa Rica are the defending champions.

== Teams ==
All seven UNCAF associations participated in the tournament, with each association entering one team, except for the host Guatemala, which entered two teams.

Association	Team(s)	App.	Previous best
Belize	Sagitun Girlz	2nd	Eight place (2023)
Costa Rica	Alajuelense	3rd	Champions (2022, 2023)
El Salvador	Alianza Woman	4th	Third place (2018, 2019)
Guatemala	Unifut	6th	Champions (2018)
Guatemala	Xinabajul	1st	Debut
Honduras	Under	1st	Debut
Nicaragua	Real Estelí	1st	Debut
Panama	Santa Fé	1st	Debut

== Venues ==
All matches were played at the Estadio Cementos Progreso in Guatemala City, Guatemala.

== Group stage ==
The seven teams were divided into two groups of four teams. The group winners advance to the Final. While runner-ups play for third place. Third place finishers play for Fifth place. While bottom of the table plays for seventh place. All times were local,CST (UTC−6).

=== Group A ===
Pos	Team	Pld	W	D	L	GF	GA	GD	Pts	Qualification
1	(Panama) Santa Fé	3	2	1	0	4	2	+2	7	Final
2	(Guatemala) Unifut Antigua (H)	3	2	0	1	7	1	+6	6	Third place match
3	(Nicaragua) Real Estelí	3	1	0	2	4	3	+1	3	Fifth place match
4	(Honduras) Under	3	0	1	2	1	10	−9	1	Seventh place match

Source: UNCAF
(H) Hosts
19 July 2024
16:30

Real Estelí (Nicaragua)	1–2	(Panama) Santa Fé
Guevara 90' (o.g.)		Delgado 31'; Hernández 62'

Estadio Cementos Progreso, Guatemala City
19 July 2024
19:00

Unifut Antigua (Guatemala)	6–0	(Honduras) Under
Fuentes 8'; Fagundes 20', 58'; Herrera 29', 72'; Alvarez 90+2'	Report

Estadio Cementos Progreso, Guatemala City
Referee: Dannia Sevilla (Costa Rica)

21 July 2024
16:30

Santa Fé (Panama)	1–1	(Honduras) Under
Delgado 40'		Canales 45+2'

Estadio Cementos Progreso, Guatemala City
Referee: Daniela Romero (El Salvador)
21 July 2024
19:00

Unifut Antigua (Guatemala)	1–0	(Nicaragua) Real Estelí
Fagundes 54'	Report

Estadio Cementos Progreso, Guatemala City
Referee: Fernanda Marquez (Mexico)

23 July 2024
16:30

Under (Honduras)	0–3	(Nicaragua) Real Estelí
		Lopez 52', 72' (pen.); Aguilar 64'

Estadio Cementos Progreso, Guatemala City
Referee: Fernanda Marquez (Mexico)
23 July 2024
19:00

Unifut Antigua (Guatemala)	0–1	(Panama) Santa Fé
	Report	Hernández 27'

Estadio Cementos Progreso, Guatemala City
Referee: Ximena Marquez Ruiz (Mexico)

=== Group B ===
Pos	Team	Pld	W	D	L	GF	GA	GD	Pts	Qualification
1	(El Salvador) Alianza	3	3	0	0	11	4	+7	9	Final
2	(Costa Rica) Alajuelense	3	2	0	1	9	4	+5	6	Third place match
3	(Guatemala) Xinabajul (H)	3	1	0	2	6	7	−1	3	Fifth place match
4	(Belize) Sagitun Girlz	3	0	0	3	3	14	−11	0	Seventh place match

Source: UNCAF
(H) Hosts
19 July 2024
11:00

Alianza (El Salvador)	3–2	(Guatemala) Xinabajul
Torres 8'; Carpio 45+1' (pen.); Zuniga 83'	Report	Stosich 50'; Galindo 86'

Estadio Cementos Progreso, Guatemala City
Referee: Kartiza Guerra (Honduras)
19 July 2024
14:00

Alajuelense (Costa Rica)	6–0	(Belize) Sagitun Girlz
Varela 14', 28'; Arroyo 25'; Mesén 61'; Pinell 68' (pen.); López 78'

Estadio Cementos Progreso, Guatemala City
Referee: Yatzuri Gómez (Panama)

21 July 2024
11:00

Sagitun Girlz (Belize)	1–5	(El Salvador) Alianza
Narvaez 40'		Torres 10', 46', 55'; Alvarenga 76', 84'

Estadio Cementos Progreso, Guatemala City
Referee: Génesis De León (Guatemala)
21 July 2024
14:00

Xinabajul (Guatemala)	1–2	(Costa Rica) Alajuelense
Arias 66'	Report	Mesén 10'; Pinell 90+1' (pen.)

Estadio Cementos Progreso, Guatemala City
Referee: Belkis Flores (Honduras)

23 July 2024
11:00

Xinabajul (Guatemala)	3–2	(Belize) Sagitun Girlz
Rosales 58' (pen.), 76'; Arias 75' (pen.)	Report	Perez 32'; Velasquez 39'

Estadio Cementos Progreso, Guatemala City
Referee: Kartiza Guerra (Honduras)
23 July 2024
14:00

Alajuelense (Costa Rica)	1–3	(El Salvador) Alianza
Coto 45+2'		Zuniga 15'; Ortiz 28'; Torres 85'

Estadio Cementos Progreso, Guatemala City
Referee: Glenda Lopez (Guatemala)

== Knockout stage ==
=== Seventh place game ===
25 July 2024
11:00

Sagitun Girlz (Belize)	0–3	(Honduras) Under
		Martínez 10', 82'; Haylock 65'

Estadio Cementos Progreso, Guatemala City
Referee: Génesis De León (Guatemala)

=== Fifth place game ===
25 July 2024
14:00

Real Estelí (Nicaragua)	1–2	(Guatemala) Xinabajul
Silva 40'	Report	Esquivel 39'; Larios 75'

Estadio Cementos Progreso, Guatemala City
Referee: Ximena Marquez Ruiz (Mexico)

=== Third place match ===
25 July 2024
16:30

Unifut Antigua (Guatemala)	1–1	(Costa Rica) Alajuelense
Márquez 23'	Report	Rangel 90+2'
Penalties
Herrera (penalty missed); Barrios (penalty missed); Mayén (penalty missed); Fagundes (penalty scored)	1–3	(penalty missed) Rangel; (penalty missed) Coto; (penalty scored) Chinchilla; (penalty scored) Villanueva; (penalty scored) Oporta

Estadio Cementos Progreso, Guatemala City
Referee: Sandra Benitez (El Salvador)

=== Final ===
25 July 2024
19:00

Santa Fé (Panama)	4–0	(El Salvador) Alianza
González 22'; Delgado 35', 63'; Onodera 60'

Estadio Cementos Progreso, Guatemala City

== Statistics ==
=== Goalscorers ===
There have been 57 goals scored in 20 matches, for an average of 2.85 goals per match (as of 25 July 2024).

Rank	Player	Team	Goals
1	(Puerto Rico) Cristina Torres	(El Salvador) Alianza	5
2	(El Salvador) Vasthy Delgado	(Panama) Santa Fé	4
3	(Brazil) Larissa Fagundes	(Guatemala) Unifut Antigua	3
4	(Guatemala) Vivian Herrera	(Guatemala) Unifut Antigua	2
4	(Honduras) Yendy Martínez	(Honduras) Under	2
4	(Costa Rica) Sofía Varela	(Costa Rica) Alajuelense	2
4	(El Salvador) Valentina Alvarenga	(El Salvador) Alianza	2
4	(Costa Rica) Ángela Mesén	(Costa Rica) Alajuelense	2
4	(Costa Rica) Alexandra Pinell	(Costa Rica) Alajuelense	2
4	(El Salvador) Yoselyn Lopez	(Nicaragua) Real Estelí	2
4	(Panama) Arlen Hernández	(Panama) Santa Fé	2
4	(Guatemala) Yareni Rosales	(Guatemala) Xinabajul	2
4	(Guatemala) Larissa Arias	(Guatemala) Xinabajul	2
4	(El Salvador) Stephanie Zuniga	(El Salvador) Alianza	2
9	(Guatemala) Elisa Fuentes	(Guatemala) Unifut Antigua	1
9	(Panama) Schiandra González	(Panama) Santa Fé	1
9	(Panama) Alison Onodera	(Panama) Santa Fé	1
9	(Nicaragua) Mayqueling Márquez	(Guatemala) Unifut Antigua	1
9	(Guatemala) Paola Alvarez	(Guatemala) Unifut Antigua	1
9	(El Salvador) Génesis Carpio	(El Salvador) Alianza	1
9	(El Salvador) Priscila Ortiz	(El Salvador) Alianza	1
9	(Guatemala) Marisol Stosich	(Guatemala) Xinabajul	1
9	(Guatemala) Adelina Esquivel	(Guatemala) Xinabajul	1
9	(Guatemala) Vilma Larios	(Guatemala) Xinabajul	1
9	(Guatemala) Linda Galindo	(Guatemala) Xinabajul	1
9	(Costa Rica) Katerine Arroyo	(Costa Rica) Alajuelense	1
9	(Costa Rica) Wyzangel López	(Costa Rica) Alajuelense	1
9	(Panama) Kenia Rangel	(Costa Rica) Alajuelense	1
9	(Costa Rica) María Coto	(Costa Rica) Alajuelense	1
9	(Belize) Roshanny Narvaez	(Belize) Sagitun Girlz	1
9	(Belize) Khalydia Velasquez	(Belize) Sagitun Girlz	1
9	(Belize) Kenya Perez	(Belize) Sagitun Girlz	1
9	(Honduras) Laura Canales	(Honduras) Under	1
9	(Honduras) Kendra Haylock	(Honduras) Under	1
9	(Nicaragua) Doriana Aguilar	(Nicaragua) Real Estelí	1
9	(Nicaragua) Nathaly Silva	(Nicaragua) Real Estelí	1

=== Own goals ===
Rank	Player	Team	Goals
1	(Panama) Maria Guevara	(Panama) Santa Fé	1

== Final standings ==
Per statistical convention in football, matches decided in extra time are counted as wins and losses, while matches decided by a penalty shoot-out are counted as draws.

Pos.	Team	Pld	W	D	L	Pts	GF	GA	GD
1	(Panama) Santa Fé	4	4	0	0	12	8	2	+6
2	(El Salvador) Alianza	4	3	0	1	9	11	8	+3
3	(Costa Rica) Alajuelense	4	2	1	1	7	10	5	+5
4	(Guatemala) Unifut Antigua	4	2	1	1	7	8	2	+6
5	(Guatemala) Xinabajul	4	2	0	2	6	8	8	0
6	(Nicaragua) Real Estelí	4	1	0	3	3	5	5	0
7	(Honduras) Under	4	1	1	2	4	4	10	−6
8	(Belize) Sagitun Girlz	4	0	0	4	0	3	18	−15
