= Football at the 2017 Central American Games – Women's team squads =

These are the squad listings of the women's national teams at the 2017 Central American Games.

== Costa Rica ==
Head coach: Amelia Valverde

No.	Pos.	Player	Date of birth (age)	Club
1	GK	Dinnia Díaz	14 January 1988 (aged 29)	(Costa Rican Football Federation) U.D. Moravia
2	DF	Gabriela Guillén	1 March 1992 (aged 25)	(Costa Rican Football Federation) Deportivo Saprissa
3	DF	María Coto	2 March 1988 (aged 29)`	(Costa Rican Football Federation) U.D. Moravia
4	DF	Mariana Benavides	26 December 1994 (aged 22)	(Costa Rican Football Federation) U.D. Moravia
5	DF	María Paula Elizondo	30 November 1998 (aged 19)	(Costa Rican Football Federation) Deportivo Saprissa
6	DF	Carol Sánchez	16 April 1986 (aged 31)	(Costa Rican Football Federation) U.D. Moravia
7	FW	Melissa Herrera	10 October 1996 (aged 21)	(Colombian Football Federation) Independiente Santa Fe
8	DF	Daniela Cruz	8 March 1991 (aged 26)	(Costa Rican Football Federation) Deportivo Saprissa
9	FW	Sofía Varela	28 March 1998 (aged 19)	(Costa Rican Football Federation) Dimas
11	FW	Priscila Chinchilla	11 July 2001 (aged 16)	(Costa Rican Football Federation) U.D. Moravia
12	FW	Lixy Rodríguez	4 November 1990 (aged 27)	(Costa Rican Football Federation) Deportivo Saprissa
13	MF	María José Morales	22 February 1996 (aged 21)	(Costa Rican Football Federation) San José
15	MF	Cristín Granados	19 August 1989 (aged 28)	(Costa Rican Football Federation) U.D. Moravia
16	MF	Katherine Alvarado	11 April 1991 (aged 26)	(Costa Rican Football Federation) Deportivo Saprissa
17	FW	Diana Araya	9 October 1996 (aged 21)	(Costa Rican Football Federation) A.D. Cariari Pococí
18	GK	Fabiana Solano	22 October 2001 (aged 16)	(Costa Rican Football Federation) A.D. Desampa 2000
20	DF	Wendy Acosta	19 December 1989 (aged 27)	
21	MF	Gloriana Villalobos	20 August 1999 (aged 18)	(United States Soccer Federation) Florida State

== El Salvador ==
Head coach: José Ricardo Herrera

No.	Pos.	Player	Date of birth (age)	Club
1	GK	Laura Viera		
2	DF	Sonja López		(United States Soccer Federation) Smidt Tech Grey Wolves
3	DF	Jeimy Prudencio	3 January 1995 (aged 22)	(Salvadoran Football Federation) C.D. Luis Ángel Firpo
4	DF	Yaquelyn Jovel	8 June 2000 (aged 17)	(Salvadoran Football Federation) C.D. Luis Ángel Firpo
5	MF	Ingrid Ramos	13 March 1991 (aged 26)	(Salvadoran Football Federation) Legends
6	DF	Ashley Quintanilla		(United States Soccer Federation) East Bakersfield Blades
7	MF	Zulia Menjívar	10 June 1992 (aged 25)	(Salvadoran Football Federation) Legends
8	MF	Alejandra Herrera	9 October 1992 (aged 25)	(Argentine Football Association) River Plate
9	FW	Liliana Payés	21 April 1995 (aged 22)	(Salvadoran Football Federation) Legends
10	MF	Maggi Segovia	15 January 2001 (aged 16)	(Salvadoran Football Federation) Legends
11	FW	Brenda Cerén	24 September 1998 (aged 19)	(Salvadoran Football Federation) Allianza
12	FW	Joseline Rivas	14 January 1994 (aged 23)	(Salvadoran Football Federation) Legends
13	MF	Mara Rodríguez	6 July 2000 (aged 17)	
14	FW	Ingrid Osegueda	12 May 1993 (aged 24)	(United States Soccer Federation) Unknown
15	DF	Sandra Cortez	2 January 1997 (aged 20)	(Salvadoran Football Federation) Legends
16	MF	Sandra Tamacas	8 January 1993 (aged 24)	(Salvadoran Football Federation) Allianza
17	FW	Paola Calderón	19 March 2002 (aged 15)	(Salvadoran Football Federation) Legends
18	GK	Blanca Lemus	23 October 1999 (aged 18)	(Salvadoran Football Federation) Guazapa

== Nicaragua ==
Head coach: Elna Dixon

No.	Pos.	Player	Date of birth (age)	Club
1	GK	Bethania Aburto	5 February 1990 (aged 27)	(Nicaraguan Football Federation) UNAN Managua
2	DF	Martha Silva	11 October 1992 (aged 25)	(Nicaraguan Football Federation) Águilas de León
3	DF	Celeste Escobar	30 April 1993 (aged 24)	(Nicaraguan Football Federation) UNAN Managua
4	DF	Alys Cruz	24 February 1998 (aged 19)	(Nicaraguan Football Federation) UNAN Managua
5	DF	Kelly Ávalos	30 July 1996 (aged 21)	(Nicaraguan Football Federation) UNAN Managua
6	DF	Sheyla Flores	15 May 1998 (aged 19)	(Nicaraguan Football Federation) Águilas de León
7	MF	Julissa Acevedo	7 August 1991 (aged 26)	(Nicaraguan Football Federation) Diriangén
8	MF	Wendy Flores	24 March 1994 (aged 23)	(Nicaraguan Football Federation) UNAN Managua
9	FW	Yessenia Flores	7 July 1999 (aged 18)	(Nicaraguan Football Federation) Águilas de León
10	MF	Katherine Pereira	22 May 1999 (aged 18)	(Nicaraguan Football Federation) Las Leyendas
11	MF	Merly Hernández	16 September 1991 (aged 26)	(Nicaraguan Football Federation) UNAN Managua
12	GK	Ángela Gutiérrez	11 March 1990 (aged 27)	(Nicaraguan Football Federation) UNAN Managua
13	FW	Jansy Aguirre	18 February 1991 (aged 26)	(Nicaraguan Football Federation) Águilas de León
14	DF	Kesly Pérez	9 May 1994 (aged 23)	(Nicaraguan Football Federation) Las Leyendas
15	FW	Doriana Aguilar	2 January 1994 (aged 23)	(Nicaraguan Football Federation) Diriangén
16	DF	Olga López		(Nicaraguan Football Federation) Las Leyendas
17	MF	Josseling Berríos	3 December 1993 (aged 24)	(Nicaraguan Football Federation) UNAN Managua
18	DF	Elizabeth Arcia	31 March 1997 (aged 20)	(Nicaraguan Football Federation) Águilas de León

== Panama ==
Head coach: (Argentina) Víctor Suárez

No.	Pos.	Player	Date of birth (age)	Club
1	GK	Yenith Bailey		(Panamanian Football Federation) Sporting San Miguelito
2	DF	Yomira Pinzón		(Panamanian Football Federation) S.D. Atlético Nacional
3	DF	María Murillo		(Panamanian Football Federation) S.D. Atlético Nacional
4	DF	Gabriela Rodríguez		(United States Soccer Federation) Santa Ana Dons
5	MF	Laurie Batista		(Panamanian Football Federation) Chorrillo F.C.
6	DF	Hilary Jaén		(Panamanian Football Federation) Sporting San Miguelito
7	MF	Kenia Rangel		(Panamanian Football Federation) S.D. Atlético Nacional
8	MF	Karla Riley		(Panamanian Football Federation) Sporting San Miguelito
9	FW	Erika Hernández		(Panamanian Football Federation) Chorrillo F.C.
10	MF	Marta Cox	20 July 1997 (aged 20)	(Panamanian Football Federation) Chorrillo F.C.
11	FW	Natalia Mills	22 March 1993 (aged 24)	(Panamanian Football Federation) S.D. Atlético Nacional
12	GK	Karen Chavarría		(Panamanian Football Federation) S.D. Atlético Nacional
13	DF	Claudia Dutary		(Panamanian Football Federation) Academia de Fútbol Michi Soto (AFMS)
14	DF	Meiby Saavedra		(Panamanian Football Federation) S.D. Atlético Nacional
15	MF	María Guevara		(Panamanian Football Federation) Brujas F.C.
16	MF	Aldrith Quintero		(Panamanian Football Federation) San Cristóbal FC
17	DF	Lineth Cedeño		(Panamanian Football Federation) San Cristóbal FC
18	FW	Anuvis Angulo		(Panamanian Football Federation) Brujas F.C.
