= 2018 UNCAF Women's Interclub Championship =

Copa Interclubes Femenina de UNCAF 2018

Tournament details
- Host country: Panama
- City: Panama City
- Dates: 24–29 September 2018
- Teams: 7 (from 7 associations)
- Venue: 1 (in 1 host city)

Final positions
- Champions: (Guatemala) Unifut (1st title)
- Runners-up: (Costa Rica) Moravia
- Third place: (El Salvador) Alianza
- Fourth place: (Panama) Atlético Nacional

Tournament statistics
- Matches played: 13
- Goals scored: 47 (3.62 per match)
- Top scorer: (Guatemala) Yuvitza Mayén (8 goals each)

The 2018 UNCAF Women's Interclub Championship (Spanish: 2018 Copa Interclubes Femenina de UNCAF) was the third edition of the UNCAF Women's Club Championship, Central America's premier women's club football organized by UNCAF. The tournament was played in Panama City, Panama between 24 and 29 September 2018.

Moravia from Costa Rica are the two-time defending champions. All games were 70 minutes in duration.

== Teams ==
For the first time, all seven UNCAF associations entered the tournament, with each association entering one team.

Association	Team	Qualifying method	App.	Previous best
Belize	Jewel Fury	2018 Belizean champions	1st	—
(Costa Rica) Costa Rica	Moravia	2018 Costa Rican champions	3rd	Champions (2016, 2017)
(El Salvador) El Salvador	Alianza	2018 Salvadoran champions	1st	—
Guatemala	Unifut	2018 Guatemalan champions	2nd	Runners-up (2016)
Honduras	Olimpia	2018 Honduran champions	1st	—
Nicaragua	Águilas de León	2018 Nicaraguan champions	2nd	Runners-up (2017)
Panama (host)	Atlético Nacional	2018 Panamanian champions	1st	—

== Venues ==
All matches were played at the Estadio Maracaná in Panama City.

== Group stage ==
The seven teams were divided into two groups: one group of four teams and one group of three teams. The group winners and runners-up advance to the semi-finals.

All times were local, EST (UTC−5).

=== Group A ===
Pos	Team	Pld	W	D	L	GF	GA	GD	Pts	Qualification
1	(Guatemala) Unifut	3	2	1	0	15	2	+13	7	Knockout stage
2	(Panama) Atlético Nacional (H)	3	1	1	1	8	2	+6	4	Knockout stage
3	(Honduras) Olimpia	3	1	1	1	3	8	−5	4	
4	(Belize) Jewel Fury	3	0	1	2	3	17	−14	1	

Source: UNCAF
(H) Hosts
24 September 2018
16:30

Jewel Fury (Belize)	1–8	(Guatemala) Unifut
Jolon 68' (o.g.)		Mayén 13', 26', 43'; Monterroso 18', 70+2'; Rivera 44'; De Leon 50'; Herrera 70'

Estadio Maracaná, Panama City
24 September 2018
19:00

Atlético Nacional (Panama)	0–1	(Honduras) Olimpia
		Romero 23'

Estadio Maracaná, Panama City

25 September 2018
16:30

Unifut (Guatemala)	6–0	(Honduras) Olimpia
Monterroso 13', 20', 47', 64'; Mayén 42', 70+2'

Estadio Maracaná, Panama City
25 September 2018
19:00

Atlético Nacional (Panama)	7–0	(Belize) Jewel Fury
Pinzón 32', 70+4'; Ortiz 55'; Angulo 57'; Mills 61'; Rangel 70', 70+1'

Estadio Maracaná, Panama City

26 September 2018
16:30

Olimpia (Honduras)	2–2	(Belize) Jewel Fury
Romero 7'; Pineda 31'		Quiroz 37'; Gamboa 70+4'

Estadio Maracaná, Panama City
26 September 2018
19:00

Atlético Nacional (Panama)	1–1	(Guatemala) Unifut
Pinzón 55'		Mayén 4'

Estadio Maracaná, Panama City

=== Group B ===
Pos	Team	Pld	W	D	L	GF	GA	GD	Pts	Qualification
1	(Costa Rica) Moravia	2	1	1	0	4	1	+3	4	Knockout stage
2	(El Salvador) Alianza	2	1	1	0	4	2	+2	4	Knockout stage
3	(Nicaragua) Águilas de León	2	0	0	2	1	6	−5	0	

Source: UNCAF
24 September 2018
14:00

Águilas de León (Nicaragua)	1–3	(El Salvador) Alianza
Flores 57'		Tamacas 40'; Herrara 55'; Molina 70+2'

Estadio Maracaná, Panama City

25 September 2018
14:00

Alianza (El Salvador)	1–1	(Costa Rica) Moravia
Cerén 32'		Coto 32'

Estadio Maracaná, Panama City

26 September 2018
14:00

Moravia (Costa Rica)	3–0	(Nicaragua) Águilas de León
Elizondo 49'; Sáenz 54'; Coto 66'

Estadio Maracaná, Panama City

== Knockout stage ==
=== Bracket ===
Semi-finals
28 September
(Guatemala) Unifut	2
(El Salvador) Alianza	0
28 September
(Costa Rica) Moravia (p)	1 (14)
(Panama) Atlético Nacional	1 (13)

Final
29 September
(Guatemala) Unifut	1
(Costa Rica) Moravia	0
Third place match
29 September
(El Salvador) Alianza	3
(Panama) Atlético Nacional	1

=== Semi-finals ===
28 September 2018
16:00

Unifut (Guatemala)	2–0	(El Salvador) Alianza
Mayén 32'; Monterroso 62'

Estadio Maracaná, Panama City

28 September 2018
19:00

Moravia (Costa Rica)	1–1	(Panama) Atlético Nacional
Araya 47'		Angulo 63'
Penalties
	14–13

Estadio Maracaná, Panama City

=== Third place match ===
29 September 2018
14:00

Alianza (El Salvador)	3–1	(Panama) Atlético Nacional
Cerén 8', 46'; Herrera 53'		Mills 40'

Estadio Maracaná, Panama City

=== Final ===
29 September 2018
16:30

Unifut (Guatemala)	1–0	(Costa Rica) Moravia
Mayén 68'

Estadio Maracaná, Panama City
