= 2017 UNCAF Women's Interclub Championship =

Campeonato Interclubes Femenino de UNCAF 2017
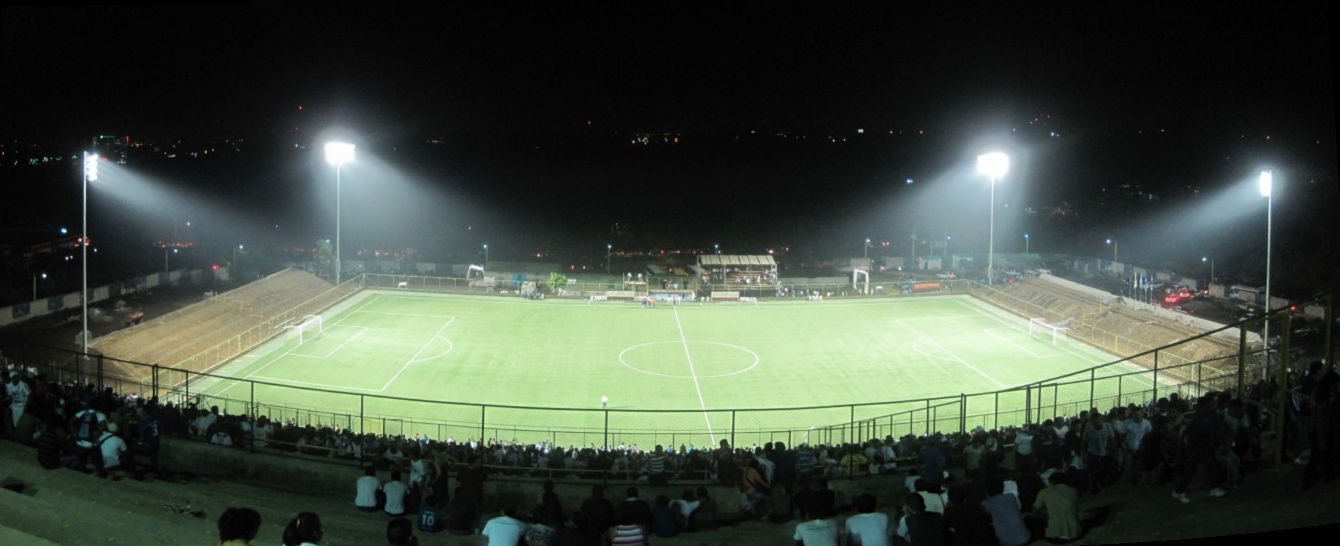
- The Nicaragua National Football Stadium hosted the tournament

Tournament details
- Host country: Nicaragua
- City: Managua
- Dates: 4–9 September 2017
- Teams: 6 (from 5 associations)
- Venue: 1 (in 1 host city)

Final positions
- Champions: (Costa Rica) Moravia (2nd title)
- Runners-up: (Nicaragua) UNAN Managua
- Third place: (Nicaragua) Águilas de León
- Fourth place: (Honduras) UPNFM

Tournament statistics
- Matches played: 10
- Goals scored: 45 (4.5 per match)
- Top scorer: (Nicaragua) Sheyla Flores (5 goals)
- Best goalkeeper: (Costa Rica) Dinnia Díaz

The 2017 UNCAF Women's Interclub Championship (Spanish: 2017 Campeonato Interclubes Femenino de UNCAF) was the second edition of the UNCAF Women's Club Championship, Central America's premier women's club football organized by UNCAF. The tournament was played in Managua, Nicaragua between 4 and 9 September 2017.

In the final, Moravia from Costa Rica defeated UNAN Managua from Nicaragua to win their second consecutive title. All games were 80 minutes in duration.

== Teams ==
A total of six teams from five of the seven UNCAF associations entered the tournament.

Association	Team	Qualifying method	App.	Previous best
Belize	Orchids (formerly Belize City)	2017 Belizean champions	1st	—
(Costa Rica) Costa Rica	Moravia	2017 Costa Rican champions	2nd	Champions (2016)
(El Salvador) El Salvador	Leyendas	2017 Salvadoran champions	1st	—
Honduras	UPNFM	2017 Honduran champions	1st	—
Nicaragua (hosts)	Águilas de León	2017 Nicaraguan champions	1st	—
Nicaragua (hosts)	UNAN Managua	2017 Nicaraguan runners-up	2nd	Group stage (2016)

Associations that did not enter a team
- Guatemala (suspended)
- Panama

== Venues ==
All matches were played at the Nicaragua National Football Stadium in Managua.

== Group stage ==
The six teams were divided into two groups of three. The group winners and runners-up advanced to the semi-finals.

All times were local, CST (UTC−6).

=== Group A ===
Pos	Team	Pld	W	D	L	GF	GA	GD	Pts	Qualification
1	(Nicaragua) Águilas de León (H)	2	2	0	0	13	0	+13	6	Knockout stage
2	(Honduras) UPNFM	2	1	0	1	4	5	−1	3	Knockout stage
3	(Belize) Orchids	2	0	0	2	1	13	−12	0	

Source: UNCAF
(H) Hosts
4 September 2017
19:00

Águilas de León (Nicaragua)	9–0	(Belize) Orchids
Aguirre 4', 55'; S. Flores 8', 9', 12'; Solís 26', 79' (pen.); Salazar 30'; D. López 34'

Nicaragua National Football Stadium, Managua
Referee: Cardella Samuels (Jamaica)

5 September 2017
19:00

Orchids (Belize)	1–4	(Honduras) UPNFM
Gentle 80+4'		Lagos 3'; Aguilar 14', 68'; Hernández 31'

Nicaragua National Football Stadium, Managua
Referee: Mirian León (El Salvador)

6 September 2017
19:00

Águilas de León (Nicaragua)	4–0	(Honduras) UPNFM
Aguirre 10'; Solís 37'; S. Flores 75', 77'

Nicaragua National Football Stadium, Managua
Referee: Marianela Araya (Costa Rica)

=== Group B ===
Pos	Team	Pld	W	D	L	GF	GA	GD	Pts	Qualification
1	(Nicaragua) UNAN Managua (H)	2	2	0	0	3	1	+2	6	Knockout stage
2	(Costa Rica) Moravia	2	1	0	1	11	1	+10	3	Knockout stage
3	(El Salvador) Leyendas	2	0	0	2	1	13	−12	0	

Source: UNCAF
(H) Hosts
4 September 2017
15:30

UNAN Managua (Nicaragua)	2–1	(El Salvador) Leyendas
W. Flores 17' (pen.); Cruz 20'		Payes 56'

Nicaragua National Football Stadium, Managua
Referee: Melissa Borjas (Honduras)

5 September 2017
15:30

Leyendas (El Salvador)	0–11	(Costa Rica) Moravia
		M. López 9'; Elizondo 12'; Villalobos 30', 40', 57'; Coto 54', 64', 65'; Granados 56'; Benavides 77' (pen.); Rojas 80+2'

Nicaragua National Football Stadium, Managua
Referee: Carol Oliva (Guatemala)

6 September 2017
15:30

Moravia (Costa Rica)	0–1	(Nicaragua) UNAN Managua
		Treminio 37'

Nicaragua National Football Stadium, Managua
Referee: Melissa Pérez (Panama)

== Knockout stage ==
=== Bracket ===
Semi-finals
8 September
(Nicaragua) UNAN Managua (p)	2 (4)
(Honduras) UPNFM	2 (3)
8 September
(Nicaragua) Águilas de León	0
(Costa Rica) Moravia	1

Final
9 September
(Nicaragua) UNAN Managua	0
(Costa Rica) Moravia	2
Third place match
9 September
(Honduras) UPNFM	2
(Nicaragua) Águilas de León	3

=== Semi-finals ===
8 September 2017
15:30

UNAN Managua (Nicaragua)	2–2	(Honduras) UPNFM
Páiz 4'; W. Flores 63' (pen.)		Banegas 45'; Ortega 80+3'
Penalties
Cruz (penalty scored); Gutiérrez (penalty scored); A. López (penalty scored); Treminio (penalty scored)	4–3	(penalty scored) Hernández; (penalty scored) Ortega; (penalty missed) Méndez; (penalty scored) Mejía; (penalty missed) Antúnez

Nicaragua National Football Stadium, Managua
Referee: Marianela Araya (Costa Rica)

8 September 2017
19:00

Águilas de León (Nicaragua)	0–1	(Costa Rica) Moravia
		Villalobos 80+3'

Nicaragua National Football Stadium, Managua
Referee: Mirian León (El Salvador)

=== Third place match ===
9 September 2017
15:30

UPNFM (Honduras)	2–3	(Nicaragua) Águilas de León
Hernández 53'; Ortega 64'		Solís 7'; Jiménez 29'; J. Flores 70'

Nicaragua National Football Stadium, Managua
Referee: Cardella Samuels (Jamaica)

=== Final ===
9 September 2017
19:00

UNAN Managua (Nicaragua)	0–2	(Costa Rica) Moravia
		Granados 52'; Rojas 67'

Nicaragua National Football Stadium, Managua
Attendance: 357
Referee: Melissa Borjas (Honduras)

== Top goalscorers ==
Rank	Player	Team	Goals
1	(Nicaragua) Sheyla Flores	(Nicaragua) Águilas de León	5
2	(Nicaragua) Ninoska Solís	(Nicaragua) Águilas de León	4
2	(Costa Rica) Karla Villalobos	(Costa Rica) Moravia	4
4	(Nicaragua) Jansy Aguirre	(Nicaragua) Águilas de León	3
4	(Costa Rica) Daniela Coto	(Costa Rica) Moravia	3
6	(Honduras) Dulce Aguilar	(Honduras) UPNFM	2
6	(Nicaragua) Wendy Flores	(Nicaragua) UNAN Managua	2
6	(Costa Rica) Cristín Granados	(Costa Rica) Moravia	2
6	(Honduras) Riccy Hernández	(Honduras) UPNFM	2
6	(Honduras) Krystal Ortega	(Honduras) UPNFM	2
6	(Costa Rica) Yerli Rojas	(Costa Rica) Moravia	2

== Awards ==
Award	Player	Team
Top Scorer	(Nicaragua) Sheyla Flores	(Nicaragua) Águilas de León
Best Goalkeeper	(Costa Rica) Dinnia Díaz	(Costa Rica) Moravia
