= 2016 UNCAF Women's Interclub Championship =

Campeonato Interclubes Femenino de UNCAF 2016
- 2016 UNCAF Women's Interclub Championship official poster

Tournament details
- Host country: Costa Rica
- City: San José
- Dates: 24–29 May 2016
- Teams: 6 (from 4 associations)
- Venue: 1 (in 1 host city)

Final positions
- Champions: (Costa Rica) Moravia (1st title)
- Runners-up: (Guatemala) Unifut

Tournament statistics
- Matches played: 9
- Goals scored: 32 (3.56 per match)
- Top scorer: (Costa Rica) Cristín Granados (4 goals)
- Best player: (Costa Rica) Cristín Granados
- Best goalkeeper: (Guatemala) Joselin Franco

The 2016 UNCAF Women's Interclub Championship (Spanish: 2016 Campeonato Interclubes Femenino de UNCAF) was the first edition of the UNCAF Women's Interclub Championship, Central America's women's club football championship organized by UNCAF. The tournament was played in San José, Costa Rica between 24 and 29 May 2016.

In the final, Moravia from Costa Rica defeated Unifut from Guatemala to win the inaugural title. All games were 80 minutes in duration.

== Teams ==
A total of six teams from four of the seven UNCAF associations entered the tournament.

Association	Team	Qualifying method
(Costa Rica) Costa Rica (hosts)	Saprissa	2015 Costa Rican champion
(Costa Rica) Costa Rica (hosts)	Moravia	2015 Costa Rican runner-up
Guatemala	Unifut	2015 Guatemalan Apertura champion
Guatemala	Pares	2015 Guatemalan Apertura runner-up
Honduras	Universidad de San Pedro Sula	2016 Honduran champion
Nicaragua	UNAN Managua	2015 Nicaraguan champion

Associations that did not enter a team
- Belize
- (El Salvador) El Salvador
- Panama

== Venues ==
All matches were played at the Estadio Ernesto Rohrmoser (artificial turf) in San José.

== Group stage ==
The six teams were divided into two groups of three. The group winners and runners-up advanced to the semi-finals.

All times were local, CST (UTC−6).

=== Group A ===
Pos	Team	Pld	W	D	L	GF	GA	GD	Pts	Qualification
1	(Costa Rica) Saprissa (H)	2	2	0	0	9	0	+9	6	Knockout stage
2	(Honduras) USPS	2	1	0	1	2	6	−4	3	Knockout stage
3	(Guatemala) Pares	2	0	0	2	1	6	−5	0	

Source: UNCAF
(H) Hosts
24 May 2016
20:00

Saprissa (Costa Rica)	4–0	(Guatemala) Pares
F. Villalobos 31', 71'; Alvarado 40'; Granados 53'	Report

Estadio Ernesto Rohrmoser, San José
Referee: Vilma Montes (El Salvador)

25 May 2016
20:00

Pares (Guatemala)	1–2	(Honduras) USPS
Oliva 69'	Report	Aguilar 9'; Amaya 63'

Estadio Ernesto Rohrmoser, San José
Referee: Kimberly Sánchez (Costa Rica)

26 May 2016
20:00

USPS (Honduras)	0–5	(Costa Rica) Saprissa
	Report	F. Villalobos 26'; Del Campo 67'; Granados 69', 77'; Elizondo 80'

Estadio Ernesto Rohrmoser, San José
Referee: Carol Oliva (Guatemala)

=== Group B ===
Pos	Team	Pld	W	D	L	GF	GA	GD	Pts	Qualification
1	(Guatemala) Unifut	2	2	0	0	5	2	+3	6	Knockout stage
2	(Costa Rica) Moravia (H)	2	1	0	1	6	5	+1	3	Knockout stage
3	(Nicaragua) UNAN Managua	2	0	0	2	1	5	−4	0	

Source: UNCAF
(H) Hosts
24 May 2016
17:45

Moravia (Costa Rica)	4–1	(Nicaragua) UNAN Managua
Morales 38'; Barrantes 55'; Molina 63', 70'	Report	A. López 18'

Estadio Ernesto Rohrmoser, San José
Referee: Melissa Pérez (Panama)

25 May 2016
17:45

UNAN Managua (Nicaragua)	0–1	(Guatemala) Unifut
	Report	Rivera 30'

Estadio Ernesto Rohrmoser, San José
Referee: Cibeles Miranda (El Salvador)

26 May 2016
17:45

Unifut (Guatemala)	4–2	(Costa Rica) Moravia
Gatica 3'; Herrera 55'; Rivera 65'; C. López 70'	Report	Barrantes 27'; Morales 59'

Estadio Ernesto Rohrmoser, San José
Referee: Melissa Pérez (Panama)

== Knockout stage ==
=== Bracket ===
Semi-finals
28 May
(Guatemala) Unifut	2
(Honduras) USPS	0
28 May
(Costa Rica) Saprissa	2
(Costa Rica) Moravia	3

Final
29 May
(Guatemala) Unifut	0
(Costa Rica) Moravia	1

=== Semi-finals ===
28 May 2016
14:00

Unifut (Guatemala)	2–0	(Honduras) USPS
Herrera 6'; C. López 40+2' (pen.)	Report

Estadio Ernesto Rohrmoser, San José
Referee: Kimberly Sánchez (Costa Rica)

28 May 2016
16:30

Saprissa (Costa Rica)	2–3	(Costa Rica) Moravia
Alvarado 7' (pen.); Granados 9'	Report	K. Villalobos 12', 68'; Rodríguez 26'

Estadio Ernesto Rohrmoser, San José
Referee: Vilma Montes (El Salvador)

=== Final ===
29 May 2016
15:00

Unifut (Guatemala)	0–1	(Costa Rica) Moravia
	Report	Coto 12'

Estadio Ernesto Rohrmoser, San José
Referee: Melissa Pérez (Panama)

== Top scorers ==
Rank	Player	Team	Goals
1	(Costa Rica) Cristín Granados	(Costa Rica) Saprissa	4
2	(Costa Rica) Fabiola Villalobos	(Costa Rica) Saprissa	3
3	(Costa Rica) Katherine Alvarado	(Costa Rica) Saprissa	2
3	(Costa Rica) María Barrantes	(Costa Rica) Moravia	2
3	(Guatemala) Vivian Herrera	(Guatemala) Unifut	2
3	(Guatemala) Cinthya López	(Guatemala) Unifut	2
3	(Costa Rica) Naomi Molina	(Costa Rica) Moravia	2
3	(Costa Rica) María Morales	(Costa Rica) Moravia	2
3	(Guatemala) Marilyn Rivera	(Guatemala) Unifut	2
3	(Costa Rica) Karla Villalobos	(Costa Rica) Moravia	2

== Awards ==
Award	Player	Team
Best Player	(Costa Rica) Cristín Granados	(Costa Rica) Saprissa
Top Scorer	(Costa Rica) Cristín Granados	(Costa Rica) Saprissa
Best Goalkeeper	(Guatemala) Joselin Franco	(Guatemala) Unifut
