= Primera División Femenina de El Salvador =

Highest division of league competition for Salvadoran women's football

- Founded: 2010
- Country: El Salvador
- Confederation: CONCACAF
- Number of clubs: 12
- Current champions: Alianza Women (2024 Clausura)
- Most championships: Alianza Women (10 Titles)
- Top scorer: Damaris Quélez (340 goals)
- Website: FESFUT

The Primera División Femenina de El Salvador is the main women's football competition for in El Salvador. It was established in 2010.

== History ==
There previously were some women's tournaments held in the late 1990s and early 2000s.

=== A New Salvadoran League ===
==== Preparation ====
In September 2019, as part of the guidelines done by CONCACAF for clubs to be able to participate in the primera division, the formation of a women's division was needed. The new division was created by the Salvadoran Primera division, which will be run instead of FESFUT. The new season will begin in September 2019.

== Format ==
La Liga Mayor Femenina follows the usual double round-robin format.

During the course of a given season (Apertura or Clausura), each club plays every other club twice, once at home and once away, for a total of 22 games.

Teams receive three points for a win, one point for a draw, and no points for a loss. Teams are ranked by total points, with the top eight clubs at the end of the season progressing through to the finals.

If points are equal between two or more clubs, goal difference usually determines their placement.

Although when it comes to qualifying for the finals, if the team in eighth and ninth spot are equal on points, then a Repechaje or Playoff is needed to determine which team gains entry into finals.

A system of relegation exists between the Primera División and the Segunda División.

In May each year, at the conclusion of both the apertura and clausura seasons, the team with the fewest points on aggregate over both seasons, is automatically relegated to the Segunda División.

== Clubs ==
A total of 12 teams contest the league in the current season

Team	Home city	Stadium
Alianza Woman	San Salvador	Complejo Deportivo de ANDA
Aguila Femenino	San Miguel	TBD
Dragon Femenino	San Miguel	TBD
FAS Femenino	Santa Ana	Estadio
Fuerte San Francisco Femenino	San Francisco Gotera	Estadio
Isidro Metapan Femenino	Santa Ana	TBD
Jocoro Femenino	Morazán	TBD
LA Firpo Femenino	Usulután	TBD
Municipal Limeno Femenil	Santa Rosa de Lima, La Unión	TBD
Once Deportivo Femenino	Ahuachapán	TBD
Platense Femenino	Zacatecoluca	Estadio
Santa Tecla Femenino	Santa Tecla	TBD

=== Former teams ===
Prior to league run by Primera division 2019

- Independiente
- El Vencedor
- ADFA Cabañas
- ADFA Ahuachapán
- C.D. Opico
- ADFA Santa Ana
- ADFA Morazán
- ADFA Sonsonate
- Sensuntepeque
- ADFA La Paz
- ADFA San Vicente
- AD Legend's
- Club Sport Guazapa
- Escuela de Fútbol Municipal de Soyapango
- Escuela Municipal de Santa Tecla
- Instituto Municipal de Deportes y Recreación (IMDER)
- Selección de San Miguel

Following the league being run Primera division 2019

- Municipal Limeno
- Sonsonate
- Chalatenango
- Atletico Marte
- Jocoro
- Santa Tecla

== Managers ==
The current managers in the LigaFemenina are:

Name	Club
(El Salvador) José de la Paz Portillo	Águila Woman
(El Salvador) Cristian Zañas	Alianza Woman
(El Salvador) Manuel Acevedo	Dragon Woman
(El Salvador) Walter Montoya	FAS Woman
	Firpo Woman
(El Salvador) Numan Asensio	Fuerte San Francisco Woman
(El Salvador) Lesly Ventura	Isidro Metapan Woman
(El Salvador) Alvaro Canizales	Jocoro Woman
	Limeno Woman
	Once Deportivo Woman
(El Salvador) Afrodicio Valladares	Platense Woman
(El Salvador) Rene David Lopez	Santa Tecla Woman

== List of finals ==
Year	Champion	Result	Runners-up	Top scorer
2010	Usulután	3–2	Sonsonate	
2016 Clausura	Opico FC	4–1	Legends	Brenda Ceren (20 goals)
2016 Apertura	Legends	3–0	Ahuachapán	Stefany Vanessa Hernández Guandique (20 goals)
2017 Clausura	Legends	3–1	Alianza	
2017 Apertura	Alianza Woman	4–2	AD Leyends	Paola Calderón (goals)
2018 Clausura	Alianza Woman	4–1	AD Leyends	Gabriella Pacheco and Maggie Segovia (23 goals)
2018 Apertura	Alianza Woman	3–1	IMDER	Sheyla Flores (26 goals)
2019 Clausura	FAS	7–1	Municipal Limeño	Alejandra Reyes (12 goals)
2019 Apertura	Alianza	4–2	FAS	Damaris Quélez (34 goals)
2020 Clausura	Season Cancelled due to the COVID-19 pandemic			
2020 Apertura	Alianza Woman	3–1	FAS	Paola Calderón (34 goals)
2021 Clausura	FAS	1–1 (3–2 (p))	Alianza Women	Francisca del Carmen González (24 goals)
2021 Apertura	Alianza Women	3–2 (4–3 (p))	FAS	Damaris Quélez (38 goals)
2022 Clausura	FAS	2–2 (5–3 (p))	Alianza Women	Damaris Quélez (14 goals)
2022 Apertura	Santa Tecla F.C.	3–2	Alianza Women	Damaris Quélez (24 goals)
2023 Clausura	Season was cancelled due to the San Salvador crowd crush.			Damaris Quélez (43 goals)
2023 Apertura	Alianza Women	3–0	Aguila	Damaris Quélez (21 goals)
2024 Clausura	Alianza Women	2–0	Isidro Metapan	Damaris Quélez (22 goals)
2024 Apertura	Alianza Woman	2–0	Limeno Women	Vanesssa Reyes (22 goals)
2025 Clausura	Alianza Woman	3–1	Limeno Women	Damaris Quélez (19 goals)
2025 Apertura	Alianza Woman	2–1	Limeno Women	Paola Calderón (42 goals)
2026 Clausura	Alianza Woman	1–0	Limeno Women	Damaris Quélez (43 goals)
2026 Apertura				

Paola Calderón

=== Championship records ===
Italics indicates the team was relegated or departed and play in Amateur division

Club	Winners	Runners-up	Winning seasons
Alianza Woman	12	4	
FAS	3	3	
Legends F.C.	2	5	
Santa Tecla B	1	0	
Usulután	1	0	
Opico FC	1	0	
Municipal Limeno Femenil	0	5	
Aguila Femenino	0	1	
Isidro Metapan Femenino	0	1	

=== All-Time goalscorers ===
Rank	Player	Goals	Years
1	Damaris Quélez	340	2019
2	Paola Calderón	224	2017
3	Vanessa Reyes	185	

== List of Foreign Players ==
- (Brazil) Amanda Conde (Alianza Women)
- (Brazil) Karoline Verardo (Alianza Women;Fuerte San Francisco)
- (Colombia) Eudis Garrido (Inter FA)
- (Colombia) Maria Rodallega (Limeno;Fuerte San Francisco)
- (Colombia) Aslyn Caravaly (Fuerte San Francisco;Inter FA)
- (Colombia) Sindy Constante (Limeno)
- (Colombia) Sara Angulo (Limeno)
- (Colombia) Kendy Morales (Limeno)
- (Colombia) Steffany Arroyo Atencia (Limeno)
- (Mexico) Lucía Yañez (FAS Femenil)
- (Mexico) Alejandra Agundez (Alianza Women)
- (Mexico) Neyda Martinez (Alianza Women)
- (United States) Anna Hurley (Alianza Women)
- (United States) Santana Pressley (Alianza Women)
- (United States) Tatiana Dabney (Alianza Women)
- (United States) Grace Paradis (Alianza Women)
- (United States) Zariah Nogales (FAS Femenil)
