= Alianza Women =

Women's association football club in San Salvador

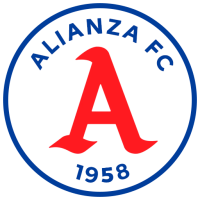
- Full name: Alianza Women Fútbol Club
- Nickname: Albitas
- Ground: Complejo Deportivo FESFUT(other home games)
- Head coach: Edwin Deras
- League: La Primera Femenina
- 2025 Clausura: Overall: 1st Playoffs: Champions
Home colours	Away colours	Third colours

Alianza Women, commonly referred to as Alianza, is a Salvadoran professional women's football club based in San Salvador, El Salvador, a part of the larger club Alianza. The club plays in the La Primera Femenina, the top tier of El Salvador women's football.

Alianza are statistically the most successful club in El Salvador women's football, holding the records for most titles won in each domestic competition they have played in. The club have won 10 league titles and finished third in UNCAF Club Championship.

== Honours ==
=== Domestic honours ===
- La Primera Femenina
  - Champions (12): 2017 Apertura, 2017 Clausura, 2018 Apertura, 2019 Apertura, 2020 Apertura, 2021 Apertura, 2023 Apertura, 2024 Clausura, 2024 Apertura, 2025 Clausura, Apertura 2025, 2026 Clausura

=== International honours ===
- UNCAF Club Championship
  - Runners up (1): 2024
  - Third Place (2): 2018, 2019

== Records ==
=== Record versus other Clubs ===
As of 2025-09-19

The Concacaf opponents below = Official tournament results: (Plus a sampling of other results)

Opponent	Last Meeting	G	W	D	L	F	A	PTS	+/-
(Canada) Whitecaps Girls Elite	2024–25 CONCACAF W Champions Cup	1	0	0	1	0	1	0	-1
(Canada) Vancouver Rise Academy	2025–26 CONCACAF W Champions Cup	1	0	0	1	0	8	0	-8
(United States) Gotham FC	2025–26 CONCACAF W Champions Cup	1	0	0	1	0	2	0	-2
(United States) Washington Spirit	2025–26 CONCACAF W Champions Cup	1	0	0	1	0	7	0	-7
(Mexico) Rayadas de Monterrey	2025–26 CONCACAF W Champions Cup	1	0	0	1	0	8	0	-8
(Nicaragua) Aguilas de Leon	UNCAF Women's Interclub Championship	1	1	0	0	3	1	3	+2
(Costa Rica) Moravia	UNCAF Women's Interclub Championship	1	0	1	0	1	1	1	0
(Panama) UNIFUT	UNCAF Women's Interclub Championship	3	1	1	1	3	4	4	-1
(Panama) Atletico Nacional	UNCAF Women's Interclub Championship	1	1	0	0	3	1	3	+2
(Panama) Universitario	UNCAF Women's Interclub Championship	1	1	0	0	5	2	3	+3
(Panama) Chorrillo FC	UNCAF Women's Interclub Championship	1	0	1	0	2	2	1	0
(Nicaragua) Real Estelí FC	UNCAF Women's Interclub Championship	1	0	0	1	0	2	0	-2
(Nicaragua) UNAN Managua	UNCAF Women's Interclub Championship	1	0	1	0	1	1	1	0
(Guatemala) Xinabajui	UNCAF Women's Interclub Championship	1	1	0	0	3	2	3	+1
(Belize) Sagitun Girlz	UNCAF Women's Interclub Championship	2	2	0	0	9	3	6	+6
(Costa Rica) Alajuelense	UNCAF Women's Interclub Championship	1	1	0	0	3	1	3	+2
(Panama) Santa Fe	UNCAF Women's Interclub Championship	1	0	0	1	0	4	0	-4
(Honduras) CDF	UNCAF Women's Interclub Championship	1	0	0	1	0	2	0	-2
Totals									

== Current squad ==
Note: Flags indicate national team as defined under FIFA eligibility rules; some limited exceptions apply. Players may hold more than one non-FIFA nationality.

No.	Pos.	Nation	Player
1	GK	SLV	Roxana Vega
4	DF	BRA	Amanda Conde
5		SLV	Jacqueline Benavides
6	DF	SLV	Rosmery Mendoza
7	MF	USA	Anna Hurley
8	MF	SLV	Joseline Lopez
9	FW	SLV	Paola Calderón
10	MF	BRA	Karoline Verardo
11	MF	USA	Grace Paradis
12		SLV	Alisson Carranza
14	MF	SLV	Paola Cerén
16		SLV	Ileana Molina
17	MF	SLV	Valerie Rivas
22	FW	SLV	Monica Menjivar
23	DF	SLV	Irma Hernandez
24	GK	SLV	Hazel Silva
26	FW	SLV	Yaneth Sotelo
29		SLV	Karen Peraza
30		SLV	Osiris Borja

No.	Pos.	Nation	Player
20		SLV	Keiry Garcia
22		SLV	Monica Rodriguez
27		SLV	Karoline Velasquez
31		SLV	Estheffaine Palma
32		SLV	Ana Martinez
33		SLV	Alexandra Ramos
34		SLV	Madeline Escobar
35		SLV	Jacqueline Amas
—	GK	SLV	Samantha Valadez
—	DF	USA	Emily Juarez
—	MF	SLV	Raquel Ramirez
—	MF	USA	Neyda Martinez
—	MF	SLV	Ashley Webb
—	FW	USA	Sierra Castles
5		SLV	Andrea Recinos
20		SLV	Keila Lino
21		SLV	Jenifer Flores
25		SLV	Valentina Jimenez
31		SLV	Gabriela Rodriguez
32		SLV	Jimena Benitez

=== Players with dual citizenship ===
- (El Salvador) (United States) Samantha Valdez
- (United States) (Mexico) Neyda Martinez
- (United States) (Mexico) Emily Juarez

=== In ===
Note: Flags indicate national team as defined under FIFA eligibility rules; some limited exceptions apply. Players may hold more than one non-FIFA nationality.

No.	Pos.	Nation	Player
—		SLV	Yohana Medrano (From Municipal Limeno Femenina)
—		SLV	Hesly Avalos (From Municipal Limeno Femenina)
—		SLV	TBD (From TBD)
—		SLV	TBD (From TBD)

No.	Pos.	Nation	Player
—		SLV	TBD (From TBD)
—		SLV	TBD (From TBD)
—		SLV	TBD (From TBD)

=== Out ===
Note: Flags indicate national team as defined under FIFA eligibility rules; some limited exceptions apply. Players may hold more than one non-FIFA nationality.

No.	Pos.	Nation	Player
—		SLV	Gladis Ulloa (To Retired)
—		SLV	Genesis Carpio (To Inter FA)
—		USA	Santana Pressley (To Iquique)
—		SLV	Linda Guillan (To TBD)
—		USA	Emily Juarez (ToTexas Lone Star SC)

No.	Pos.	Nation	Player
—		SLV	Priscila Ortiz (To Limeno)
—		SLV	Nicole Cabrera (To TBD)
—		MEX	Alejandra Agundez (To TBD)
—		USA	Tatiana Dabney (To TBD)

=== Coaching staff ===
Position	Staff
Manager	(El Salvador) Cristian Zanas
Assistant Manager	(El Salvador) Carlos Aparicio
Goalkeeper Coach	(El Salvador) Gabriel Hernandez
Team Physical Trainer	(El Salvador) Andrea Merino
Fitness Coach	(El Salvador) Andy Alas
Team Doctor	(El Salvador)
Knesliogiocal	(El Salvador)
Utility	(El Salvador) Carlos Moreira
Director of Sports	(El Salvador) tbd *

== Notable players ==
- (El Salvador) Paola Calderón
- (El Salvador) Karen Landaverde
- (Nicaragua) Sheyla Flores (First Foreign based player)
- (Puerto Rico) Laura Suárez
- (Puerto Rico) Cristina Torres
- (Mexico) Marcela Valera

== Managerial history ==
Name	Years	Notes
(El Salvador) Herbert Avilés	2016-2018	3 Liga Femenina (2017 Apertura, 2018 Clausura, 2018 Apertura)
(El Salvador) Debbie Gómez	2018-2019	1 Liga Femenina (2019 Apertura)
(El Salvador) Luis Sosa	2020–2022	2 Liga Femenina (2020 Apertura, 2021 Apertura)
(El Salvador) Edwin Deras	2023	1 Liga Femenina (2023 Apertura)
(El Salvador) Cristian Zañas	2024–August 2025	3 Liga Femenina (2024 Clausura), 2024 Apertura, 2025 Clausura 1 UNCAF Club Championship (Runners up 2024)
(El Salvador) Luis Sosa	August 2025–June 2026	2 Liga Femenina (2025 Apertura; 2026 Clausura)
(El Salvador) Edwin Deras	June 2026 - Present	
