= Virginia Lovo =

Nicaraguan footballer (1992–2023)

Personal information
- Full name: Virginia de los Ángeles Lovo Chávez
- Date of birth: 23 July 1992
- Date of death: 11 October 2023 (aged 31)
- Position: Forward

Senior career*
Years	Team	Apps	(Gls)
- Saúl Álvarez

International career
2009–2011	Nicaragua U20	4	(0)
2010–2014	Nicaragua	8	(1)
- * Club domestic league appearances and goals

Virginia de los Ángeles Lovo Chávez (23 July 1992 – 11 October 2023) was a Nicaraguan footballer who played as a forward for the Nicaragua national team. She later became a football broadcaster. She died in 2023 from cancer and was recognised in Nicaraguan journalism for her work.

== Club career ==
Lovo started playing football when she was young. Due to her talents, she was invited to play for the UAM Jaguars in the Nicaraguan women's football championship aged 15. Lovo retired from playing football in 2015 due to a knee injury. Lovo played for Saúl Álvarez in Nicaragua.

== International career ==
Lovo capped for Nicaragua at senior level during the 2010 CONCACAF Women's World Cup Qualifying qualification, two Central American and Caribbean Games editions (2010 and 2014) and the 2012 CONCACAF Women's Olympic Qualifying Tournament qualification.

== Outside football ==
Outside of football after her retirement, Lovo started in a career as a sports journalist. She also acted as a commentator for matches involving the Nicaragua men's national team and matches of the Liga Primera. As a result, she became one of only a few woman football commentators within Nicaragua. She mostly worked as a commentator for Canal 6. As a result of her talent, she was often used as the lead commentator for television broadcasts.

Following her death, the Nicaraguan Association of Sports Journalists honoured Lovo by creating the Virginia Lovo Award as a tribute to her as an annual award for women in the journalism field. Lovo was also posthumously awarded the Best Television Chronicler award in 2023.

== Death ==
Virginia Lovo died of cancer on 11 October 2023, at the age of 31.
