= Diriangén FC (women) =

Association football club in Diriamba, Nicaragua

Diriangén Femenino FC
- Full name: Diriangén Femenino Fútbol Club
- Founded: 1990
- Ground: Estadio Cacique Diriangén; Diriamba, Nicaragua
- Capacity: 7,500
- Chairman: Eleonora Rocha
- Manager: José Luis Aguirre
- League: Liga Segunda Femenina

Diriangén Femenino Fútbol Club is a Nicaraguan women's football club based in Diriamba.

== History ==
In 2021, Diriangén FC were relegated to the second-tier Liga Segunda Femenina.

== Honours ==
=== Domestic competitions ===
==== League titles ====
- Nicaraguan women's football championship
  - Winners (4): 2000, 2001, 2003, 2010
