= Irma Hernández =

Salvadoran footballer (born 2000)

Personal information
- Full name: Irma Dolores Hernández Molina
- Date of birth: 17 June 2000 (age 26)
- Position: Defender

Team information
- Current team: Alianza
- Number: 23

Senior career*
Years	Team	Apps	(Gls)
- Alianza

International career^{‡}
2019–	El Salvador	3	(0)
Medal record
Women's football
Representing El Salvador
Central American and Caribbean Games
Bronze medal – third place	2023 San Salvador
- * Club domestic league appearances and goals ‡ National team caps and goals as of 11 April 2021.

Irma Dolores Hernández Molina (born 17 June 2000) is a Salvadoran footballer who plays as a defender for Alianza FC and the El Salvador women's national team.

== Club career ==
Hernández has played for Alianza FC in El Salvador.

== International career ==
Hernández capped for El Salvador at senior level during the 2020 CONCACAF Women's Olympic Qualifying Championship qualification.

== See also ==
- List of El Salvador women's international footballers
