= Brenda Cerén =

Salvadoran footballer (born 1998)

Personal information
- Full name: Brenda Damaris Cerén Delgado
- Date of birth: 24 September 1998 (age 28)
- Place of birth: Quezaltepeque, El Salvador
- Height: 1.55 m (5 ft 1 in)
- Position: Forward

Team information
- Current team: Cruz Azul
- Number: 20

Youth career
- 2016: Ópico

Senior career*
| Years | Team | Apps | (Gls) |
| 2016 | Ópico | 9 | (20) |
| 2016 | Legends | | |
| 2017–2022 | Alianza | 49 | (72) |
| 2023–2026 | Atlas | 102 | (28) |
| 2026– | Cruz Azul | 0 | (0) |

International career^{‡}
- El Salvador U17
| 2015–2017 | El Salvador U20 | 4+ | (4) |
| 2018– | El Salvador | 42 | (26) |
Medal record
Women's football
Representing El Salvador
Central American and Caribbean Games
| Bronze medal – third place | 2023 San Salvador |
- * Club domestic league appearances and goals as of 6 February 2026 ‡ National team caps and goals as of 7 April 2026.

Brenda Damaris Cerén Delgado (born 24 September 1998) is a Salvadoran professional footballer who plays as a forward for Liga MX Femenil club Cruz Azul and the El Salvador women's national team.

== Early life ==
Cerén was born in Quezaltepeque.

== Club career ==
Cerén has played for CD Ópico and Legends FC in El Salvador. She joined Alianza FC in 2017 until 2022. She later joined Mexico's Atlas in 2023 until 2026. On 26 June 2026, she joined Mexican side Cruz Azul.

== International career ==
Cerén represented El Salvador at two CONCACAF Women's U-20 Championship qualification editions (2015 and 2018) and the 2017 Central American Games. She capped at senior level during the 2018 CONCACAF Women's Championship qualification and the 2020 CONCACAF Women's Olympic Qualifying Championship qualification.

== Personal life ==
Cerén's brothers, Darwin and Óscar, and sister Paola are footballers as well.

== International goals ==
Scores and results list El Salvador's goal tally first.

| No. | Date | Venue | Opponent | Score | Result | Competition |
|---|---|---|---|---|---|---|
| 1. | 6 December 2017 | Estadio Independencia, Estelí, Nicaragua | Nicaragua | 1–2 | 1–2 | 2017 Central American Games |
| 2. | 29 August 2018 | IMG Academy, Bradenton, United States | Panama | 2–2 | 2–6 | 2018 CONCACAF Women's Championship qualification |
| 3. | 6 October 2019 | Estadio Alejandro Morera Soto, Alajuela, Costa Rica | Nicaragua | 1–0 | 1–2 | 2020 CONCACAF Women's Olympic Qualifying Championship qualification |
| 4. | 16 February 2022 | Estadio Cuscatlán, San Salvador, El Salvador | Belize | 4–0 | 6–0 | 2022 CONCACAF W Championship qualification |
| 5. | 19 February 2022 | Estadio Panamericano, San Cristóbal, Dominican Republic | Aruba | 1–0 | 7–1 | 2022 CONCACAF W Championship qualification |
| 6. | 29 June 2023 | Estadio Las Delicias, Santa Tecla, El Salvador | Jamaica | 3–1 | 5–2 | 2023 Central American and Caribbean Games |
| 7. | 1 July 2023 | Estadio Las Delicias, Santa Tecla, El Salvador | Mexico | 1–2 | 2–3 | 2023 Central American and Caribbean Games |
| 8. | 3 July 2023 | Estadio Las Delicias, Santa Tecla, El Salvador | Puerto Rico | 2–2 | 2–2 | 2023 Central American and Caribbean Games |
| 9. | 5 July 2023 | Estadio Las Delicias, Santa Tecla, El Salvador | Venezuela | 1–2 | 1–2 | 2023 Central American and Caribbean Games |
| 10. | 20 September 2023 | Estadio Nacional de Fútbol, Managua, Nicaragua | Nicaragua | 1–0 | 3–0 | 2024 CONCACAF W Gold Cup qualification |
| 11. | 24 September 2023 | Estadio Las Delicias, Santa Tecla, El Salador | Martinique | 2–1 | 9–1 | 2024 CONCACAF W Gold Cup qualification |
| 12. | 24 September 2023 | Estadio Las Delicias, Santa Tecla, El Salador | Martinique | 8–1 | 9–1 | 2024 CONCACAF W Gold Cup qualification |
| 13. | 29 November 2023 | Stade Pierre-Aliker, Fort-de-France, Martinique | Martinique | 2–0 | 2–0 | 2024 CONCACAF W Gold Cup qualification |
| 14. | 3 December 2023 | Estadio Jorge "El Mágico" González, San Salvador, El Salvador | Nicaragua | 2–1 | 4–1 | 2024 CONCACAF W Gold Cup qualification |
| 15. | 17 February 2024 | Dignity Health Sports Park, Carson, United States | Guatemala | 1–0 | 3–1 | 2024 CONCACAF W Gold Cup qualification |
| 16. | 17 February 2024 | Dignity Health Sports Park, Carson, United States | Guatemala | 2–0 | 3–1 | 2024 CONCACAF W Gold Cup qualification |
| 17. | 17 February 2024 | Dignity Health Sports Park, Carson, United States | Guatemala | 3–0 | 3–1 | 2024 CONCACAF W Gold Cup qualification |
| 18. | 16 July 2024 | Estadio Las Delicias, Santa Tecla, El Salvador | Peru | 2–0 | 3–0 | Friendly |
| 19. | 19 February 2025 | Estadio Rodrigo Paz Delgado, Quito, Ecuador | Ecuador | 1–4 | 1–4 | Friendly |
| 20. | 22 February 2025 | Estadio Rodrigo Paz Delgado, Quito, Ecuador | Ecuador | 1–1 | 3–2 | Friendly |
| 21. | 23 October 2025 | Cementos Progreso Stadium, Guatemala City, Guatemala | Panama | 2–0 | 5–0 | 2025 Central American Games |
| 22. | 27 October 2025 | Cementos Progreso Stadium, Guatemala City, Guatemala | Nicaragua | 2–0 | 2–0 | 2025 Central American Games |
| 23. | 1 March 2026 | Estadio Las Delicias, Santa Tecla, El Salvador | Barbados | 5–0 | 13–0 | 2026 CONCACAF W Championship qualification |
| 24. | 1 March 2026 | Estadio Las Delicias, Santa Tecla, El Salvador | Barbados | 6–0 | 13–0 | 2026 CONCACAF W Championship qualification |
| 25. | 1 March 2026 | Estadio Las Delicias, Santa Tecla, El Salvador | Barbados | 10–0 | 13–0 | 2026 CONCACAF W Championship qualification |
| 26. | 17 April 2026 | Hasely Crawford Stadium, Port of Spain, Trinidad and Tobago | Trinidad and Tobago | 1–0 | 2–0 | 2026 CONCACAF W Championship qualification |
| 27. | 17 April 2026 | Hasely Crawford Stadium, Port of Spain, Trinidad and Tobago | Trinidad and Tobago | 2–0 | 2–0 | 2026 CONCACAF W Championship qualification |
| 28. | 9 June 2026 | Cementos Progreso Stadium, Guatemala City, Guatemala | Guatemala | 2–1 | 5–1 | Friendly |
| 29. | 9 June 2026 | Cementos Progreso Stadium, Guatemala City, Guatemala | Guatemala | 3–1 | 5–1 | Friendly |
| 30. | 13 October 2026 | Estadio Cuscatlán, San Salvador, El Salvador | Paraguay | 1–0 | 2–3 | Friendly |

== See also ==
- List of El Salvador women's international footballers
