= Cristel Sandí =

Costa Rican footballer (born 1998)

Personal information
- Full name: Cristel Sabrina Sandí García
- Date of birth: 23 January 1998 (age 28)
- Place of birth: Guachipelín de Escazú, Costa Rica
- Position: Defensive midfielder

Senior career*
Years	Team	Apps	(Gls)
	Dimas Escazú	19+	(8+)
- Saprissa
2022–2023.	Atlético San Luis	22	(1)

International career^{‡}
2018	Costa Rica U20	1	(0)
2021–	Costa Rica	2	(0)
- * Club domestic league appearances and goals as of 12 February 2021. ‡ National team caps and goals as of 23 February 2021.

Cristel Sabrina Sandí García (born 23 January 1998) is a Costa Rican footballer who plays as a defender for the Costa Rica women's national team.

== Club career ==
Sandí has played for Dimas Escazú in Costa Rica.

== International career ==
Sandí represented Costa Rica at the 2018 CONCACAF Women's U-20 Championship. She made her senior debut on 20 February 2021 in a 1–3 friendly away loss to Mexico.

== International goals ==
No.	Date	Venue	Opponent	Score	Result	Competition
1.	6 April 2024	Estadio Alejandro Morera Soto, Alajuela, Costa Rica	Peru	4–1	5–1	Friendly
2.	9 April 2024	FCRF Sports Complex, Alajuela, Costa Rica	Peru	2–0	2–1	Friendly
