= Alejandra Herrera (footballer) =

Salvadoran footballer (born 1992)

Personal information
- Full name: Alejandra Evangelina Herrera Reyes
- Date of birth: 9 October 1992 (age 34)
- Place of birth: San Salvador, El Salvador
- Position: Midfielder

Senior career*
Years	Team	Apps	(Gls)
2015–2018	River Plate		
2018–20??	Alianza		

International career^{‡}
2011	El Salvador U20	2	(0)
2010–2018	El Salvador	8	(3)
- * Club domestic league appearances and goals ‡ National team caps and goals as of 31 August 2018

Alejandra Evangelina Herrera Reyes (born 9 October 1992) is a Salvadoran footballer who plays as a midfielder. She has been a member of the El Salvador women's national team.

== International goals ==
Scores and results list El Salvador's goal tally first.

No.	Date	Venue	Opponent	Score	Result	Competition
1	2 October 2011	Estadio Cementos Progreso, Guatemala City, Guatemala	Costa Rica	2–0	2–6	2012 CONCACAF Women's Olympic Qualifying Tournament qualification
2	6 October 2011	Estadio Cementos Progreso, Guatemala City, Guatemala	Honduras	2–0	6–1	2012 CONCACAF Women's Olympic Qualifying Tournament qualification
3	8 October 2011	Estadio Cementos Progreso, Guatemala City, Guatemala	Guatemala	1–1	1–2	2012 CONCACAF Women's Olympic Qualifying Tournament qualification

== See also ==
- List of El Salvador women's international footballers
