= 2023 UNCAF Women's Interclub Championship =

Women's football tournament

Copa Interclubes Femenina de UNCAF 2023

Tournament details
- Host country: Panama
- City: Panama City
- Dates: 2–9 September 2023
- Teams: 8 (from 8 associations)
- Venue: 1 (in 1 host city)

Final positions
- Champions: (Costa Rica) Alajuelense (2nd title)
- Runners-up: (Panama) Tauro FC
- Third place: (Guatemala) Unifut
- Fourth place: (Honduras) Olimpia

Tournament statistics
- Matches played: 16
- Goals scored: 57 (3.56 per match)
- All statistics correct as of 9 September 2023.

The 2023 UNCAF Women's Interclub Championship (Spanish: 2023 Copa Interclubes Femenina de UNCAF) is the sixth edition of the UNCAF Women's Club Championship, Central America's premier women's club football organized by UNCAF. The tournament will be played in Panama City, Panama between 2 and 9 September 2023. Alajualense from Costa Rica are the defending champions.

== Teams ==
All seven UNCAF associations entered the tournament, with each association entering one team.

Association	Team	App.	Previous best
Belize	Sagitun Girlz	1st	-
(Costa Rica) Costa Rica	Alajualense	3rd	Champion (2022)
Panama (hosts)	Sporting San Miguelito	1st	—
Guatemala	Unifut	3rd	Champions (2018)
Honduras	Marathón	1st	—
Nicaragua	Atlético Somotillo	3rd	Runners-up (2017)
Puerto Rico	Puerto Rico Sol FC (women)	1st	—
Panama (hosts)	Tauro FC	2nd	—

== Venues ==
All matches were played at the Estadio Los Andes in Panama City, Panama.

== Group stage ==
The seven teams were divided into two groups: one group of four teams and one group of three teams. The group winners and runners-up advance to the semi-finals.

All times were local, CST (UTC−6).

=== Group A ===
Pos	Team	Pld	W	D	L	GF	GA	GD	Pts	Qualification
1	(Panama) Tauro FC (H)	3	3	0	0	8	3	+5	9	Knockout stage
2	(Guatemala) Unifut	3	1	1	1	4	2	+2	4	Knockout stage
3	Puerto Rico Sol	3	1	1	1	5	6	−1	4	
4	(Belize) Sagitun Girlz	3	0	0	3	2	10	−8	0	

Source: UNCAF
(H) Hosts
2 September 2023
16:00

Puerto Rico Sol	1-1	(Guatemala) Unifut
	Report

Estadio Los Andes in Panama City
2 September 2023
19:00

Tauro FC (Panama)	4-1	(Belize) Sagitun Girlz
Maria Murillo ⚽️; Sherline King ⚽️; Emily Cedeño ⚽️; Erika Arauz	Report

Estadio Los Andes in Panama City

4 September 2023
16:00

Sagitun Girlz (Belize)	0-3	(Guatemala) Unifut
	Report

Estadio Los Andes in Panama City
4 September 2023
19:00

Tauro FC (Panama)	4-1	Puerto Rico Sol
	Report

Estadio Los Andes in Panama City

6 September 2023
16:00

Sagitun Girlz (Belize)	1-3	Puerto Rico Sol
	Report

Estadio Los Andes in Panama City
6 September 2023
19:00

Tauro FC (Panama)	1-0	(Guatemala) Unifut
	Report

Estadio Los Andes in Panama City

=== Group B ===
Pos	Team	Pld	W	D	L	GF	GA	GD	Pts	Qualification
1	(Costa Rica) Alajuelense	3	3	0	0	8	0	+8	9	Knockout stage
2	(Honduras) Olimpia	3	1	1	1	3	6	−3	4	Knockout stage
3	(Panama) Sporting San Miguelito	3	1	0	2	4	4	0	3	
4	(Nicaragua) Atlético Somotillo	3	0	1	2	2	7	−5	1	

Source: UNCAF
3 September 2023
16:00

Atlético Somotillo (Nicaragua)	1-3	(Panama) Sporting San Miguelito
	Report

Estadio Los Andes in Panama City
3 September 2023
19:00

Alajualense (Costa Rica)	4-0	(Honduras) Olimpia
	Report

Estadio Los Andes in Panama City

5 September 2023
16:00

Atlético Somotillo (Nicaragua)	1-1	(Honduras) Olimpia
	Report

Estadio Los Andes in Panama City
5 September 2023
19:00

Sporting San Miguelito (Panama)	0-1	(Costa Rica) Alajualense
	Report

Estadio Los Andes in Panama City

7 September 2023
16:00

Sporting San Miguelito (Panama)	1-2	(Honduras) Olimpia
	Report

Estadio Los Andes in Panama City
7 September 2023
19:00

Atlético Somotillo (Nicaragua)	0-3	(Costa Rica) Alajualense
	Report

Estadio Los Andes in Panama City

== Knockout stage ==
=== Seventh place game ===
9 September 2023
9:00

Sagitun Girlz (Belize)	1-3	(Nicaragua) Atlético Somotillo
	Report

Estadio Los Andes in Panama City

=== Fifth place game ===
9 September 2023
12:00

Sporting San Miguelito (Panama)	2-4	Puerto Rico Sol
	Report

Estadio Los Andes in Panama City

=== Third place match ===
9 September 2023
15:30

Olimpia (Honduras)	1-5	(Guatemala) Unifut
	Report

Estadio Los Andes in Panama City

=== Final ===
9 September 2023
19:00

Alajualense (Costa Rica)	2-2	(Panama) Tauro FC
Karla Riley 41'; Emily Cedeno 53'	Wosoworld uncaf	Zaira Miranda 55'; Natalia Mills 58'
Penalties
	5-3

Estadio Los Andes in Panama City
Referee: (Nicaragua) Tatiana Guzmán
