= Ángela Díaz =

Puerto Rican footballer

Personal information
- Full name: Ángela Noelia Díaz Vázquez
- Date of birth: 28 November 1999 (age 26)
- Place of birth: San Juan, Puerto Rico
- Position: Forward

Team information
- Current team: Bayamón

Senior career*
Years	Team	Apps	(Gls)
- Bayamón

International career^{‡}
2015	Puerto Rico U17	2+	(4)
2015–2017	Puerto Rico U20	3+	(4)
2019–	Puerto Rico	2	(4)
- * Club domestic league appearances and goals ‡ National team caps and goals as of 7 October 2019

Ángela Noelia Díaz Vázquez (born 28 November 1999) is a Puerto Rican footballer who plays as a forward for Bayamón FC and the Puerto Rico women's national team.

== International goals ==
Scores and results list Puerto Rico's goal tally first.

No.	Date	Venue	Opponent	Score	Result	Competition
1	5 October 2019	Juan Ramón Loubriel Stadium, Bayamón, Puerto Rico	Suriname	1–0	6–1	2020 CONCACAF Women's Olympic Qualifying Championship qualification
2	5 October 2019	Juan Ramón Loubriel Stadium, Bayamón, Puerto Rico	Suriname	2–0	6–1	2020 CONCACAF Women's Olympic Qualifying Championship qualification
3	5 October 2019	Juan Ramón Loubriel Stadium, Bayamón, Puerto Rico	Suriname	6–1	6–1	2020 CONCACAF Women's Olympic Qualifying Championship qualification
4	7 October 2019	Juan Ramón Loubriel Stadium, Bayamón, Puerto Rico	Haiti	1–1	1–2	2020 CONCACAF Women's Olympic Qualifying Championship qualification
