= 2019 UNCAF Women's Interclub Championship =

Women's football tournament

Copa Interclubes Femenina de UNCAF 2019

Tournament details
- Host country: Nicaragua
- City: Managua
- Dates: 17–22 September 2019
- Teams: 7 (from 7 associations)
- Venue: 1 (in 1 host city)

Final positions
- Champions: (Costa Rica) Saprissa (1st title)
- Runners-up: (Nicaragua) UNAN Managua
- Third place: (El Salvador) Alianza
- Fourth place: (Guatemala) Unifut

Tournament statistics
- Matches played: 13
- Goals scored: 46 (3.54 per match)

The 2019 UNCAF Women's Interclub Championship (Spanish: 2019 Copa Interclubes Femenina de UNCAF) was the fourth edition of the UNCAF Women's Club Championship, Central America's premier women's club football organized by UNCAF. The tournament was played in Managua, Nicaragua between 17 and 22 September 2019.

Unifut from Guatemala are the defending champions. All games were 70 minutes in duration.

== Teams ==
All seven UNCAF associations entered the tournament, with each association entering one team.

Association	Team	App.	Previous best
Belize	Jewel Fury	2nd	Group stage (2018)
(Costa Rica) Costa Rica	Saprissa	2nd	Semi-finals (2015)
(El Salvador) El Salvador	Alianza	2nd	Third place (2018)
Guatemala	Unifut	3rd	Champions (2018)
Honduras	Marathón	1st	—
Nicaragua (hosts)	UNAN Managua	3rd	Runners-up (2017)
Panama	Universitario	1st	—

== Venues ==
All matches were played at the Estadio Nacional in Managua.

== Group stage ==
The seven teams were divided into two groups: one group of four teams and one group of three teams. The group winners and runners-up advance to the semi-finals.

All times were local, CST (UTC−6).

=== Group A ===
Pos	Team	Pld	W	D	L	GF	GA	GD	Pts	Qualification
1	(Costa Rica) Saprissa	3	3	0	0	13	2	+11	9	Knockout stage
2	(Nicaragua) UNAN Managua (H)	3	2	0	1	9	2	+7	6	Knockout stage
3	(Belize) Jewel Fury	3	1	0	2	4	16	−12	3	
4	(Honduras) Marathón	3	0	0	3	3	9	−6	0	

Source: UNCAF
(H) Hosts
17 September 2019
17:15

Marathón (Honduras)	1–4	(Costa Rica) Saprissa

Estadio Nacional, Managua
17 September 2019
19:00

UNAN Managua (Nicaragua)	7–0	(Belize) Jewel Fury

Estadio Nacional, Managua

18 September 2019
17:15

Saprissa (Costa Rica)	7–0	(Belize) Jewel Fury

Estadio Nacional, Managua
18 September 2019
19:00

UNAN Managua (Nicaragua)	1–0	(Honduras) Marathón

Estadio Nacional, Managua

19 September 2019
17:15

Jewel Fury (Belize)	4–2	(Honduras) Marathón

Estadio Nacional, Managua
19 September 2019
19:00

UNAN Managua (Nicaragua)	1–2	(Costa Rica) Saprissa

Estadio Nacional, Managua

=== Group B ===
Pos	Team	Pld	W	D	L	GF	GA	GD	Pts	Qualification
1	(El Salvador) Alianza	2	1	1	0	6	3	+3	4	Knockout stage
2	(Guatemala) Unifut	2	1	1	0	2	1	+1	4	Knockout stage
3	(Panama) Universitario	2	0	0	2	2	6	−4	0	

Source: UNCAF
17 September 2019
15:30

Unifut (Guatemala)	1–1	(El Salvador) Alianza

Estadio Nacional, Managua

18 September 2019
15:30

Alianza (El Salvador)	5–2	(Panama) Universitario

Estadio Nacional, Managua

19 September 2019
15:30

Universitario (Panama)	0–1	(Guatemala) Unifut

Estadio Nacional, Managua

== Knockout stage ==
=== Bracket ===
Semi-finals
21 September
(Costa Rica) Saprissa (p)	0 (4)
(Guatemala) Unifut	0 (2)
21 September
(El Salvador) Alianza	1 (2)
(Nicaragua) UNAN Managua (p)	1 (4)

Final
22 September
(Costa Rica) Saprissa	2
(Nicaragua) UNAN Managua	0
Third place match
22 September
(Guatemala) Unifut	1
(El Salvador) Alianza	2

=== Semi-finals ===
21 September 2019
16:30

Saprissa (Costa Rica)	0–0	(Guatemala) Unifut
Penalties
	4–2

Estadio Nacional, Managua

21 September 2019
19:00

Alianza (El Salvador)	1–1	(Nicaragua) UNAN Managua
Penalties
	2–4

Estadio Nacional, Managua

=== Third place match ===
22 September 2019
16:30

Unifut (Guatemala)	1–2	(El Salvador) Alianza

Estadio Nacional, Managua

=== Final ===
22 September 2019
19:00

Saprissa (Costa Rica)	2–0	(Nicaragua) UNAN Managua

Estadio Nacional, Managua
