= UNCAF Women's Interclub Championship =

- Organiser(s): UNCAF
- Founded: 2016
- Region: Central America
- Teams: 8
- Current champions: (Costa Rica) Alajuelense (3rd title)
- Most championships: (Costa Rica) Alajuelense (3 titles)
- Website: UNCAFut.com
- 2026 UNCAF Women's Interclub Championship

The UNCAF Women's Interclub Championship (Spanish: Campeonato Interclubes Femenino de UNCAF) is Central America's women's club football championship organized by UNCAF.

== Results ==
Season	Host	Winners	Score	Runners-up	Third place	Score	Fourth place	Number of teams
2016	Costa Rica	(Costa Rica) Moravia	1–0	(Guatemala) UNIFUT	(Costa Rica) Saprissa and (Honduras) USPS (not played)			6
2017	Nicaragua	(Costa Rica) Moravia	2–0	(Nicaragua) UNAN Managua	(Nicaragua) Águilas de León	3–2	(Honduras) UPNFM	6
2018	Panama	(Guatemala) UNIFUT	1–0	(Costa Rica) Moravia	(El Salvador) Alianza	3–1	(Panama) Atlético Nacional	7
2019	Nicaragua	(Costa Rica) Saprissa	2–0	(Nicaragua) UNAN Managua	(El Salvador) Alianza	2–1	(Guatemala) UNIFUT	7
2020	Cancelled							
2021	Cancelled							
2022	Costa Rica	(Costa Rica) Alajuelense	1–0	(Costa Rica) Saprissa	(El Salvador) FAS	0–0 (4–2 pen.)	(Panama) Tauro	8
2023	Panama	(Costa Rica) Alajuelense	2–2 (5–4 pen.)	(Panama) Tauro	(Guatemala) UNIFUT	5–1	(Honduras) Olimpia	8
2024	Guatemala	(Panama) Santa Fe	4-0	(El Salvador) Alianza	(Costa Rica) Alajuelense	1-1 (3-1 pen.)	(Guatemala) UNIFUT	8
2025	Panama	(Costa Rica) Alajuelense	1–1 (2–4 pen.)	(Nicaragua) Real Estelí	(Honduras) Under	2-0	(El Salvador) Alianza	8
2026	Nicaragua	(Guatemala) UNIFUT	3-0	(Costa Rica) Alajuelense	(El Salvador) Alianza	3-1	(Nicaragua) Real Estelí	8

== Performance by club ==
Club	Winners	Runners-up	Third	Fourth/SF	Winning years
(Costa Rica) Alajuelense	3	1	1	0	2022, 2023, 2025
(Costa Rica) Moravia	2	1	0	0	2016, 2017
(Guatemala) UNIFUT	2	1	1	2	2018, 2026
(Costa Rica) Saprissa	1	1	0	1	2019
(Panama) Santa Fe	1	0	0	0	2024
(El Salvador) Alianza	0	0	1	0	
(Nicaragua) Real Estelí	0	0	0	1	

== Performance by country ==
Country	Winners	Runners-up	Third	Fourth/SF	Winning years
Costa Rica	6	3	1	1	2016, 2017, 2019, 2022, 2023, 2025
Guatemala	2	1	1	2	2018, 2026
Panama	1	1	0	2	2024
Nicaragua	0	3	1	1	–
El Salvador	0	1	4	1	–
Honduras	0	0	1	3	–
Belize	0	0	0	0	–
Puerto Rico*	0	0	0	0	–

*Guest country
