= Nicaraguan women's football championship =

- Founded: 1996
- Country: Nicaragua
- Confederation: CONCACAF
- Number of clubs: 10
- Level on pyramid: 1
- Relegation to: Liga Segunda Feminina
- International cup: UNCAF Women's Interclub Championship
- Current champions: UNAN Managua (17th title)
- Most championships: UNAN Managua (17 titles)
- Top scorer: Sheyla Flores (281 goals)

The Campeonato Nacional de Fútbol Femenino (English: Women's Football National Championship) is the highest league of women's football in Nicaragua. Established in 1996, it is run by FENIFUT.

== Competition format ==
The current format which was adopted in 2002 features ten teams playing a double round-robin. After those the six best placed teams advance to the playoffs. Three matches are played over two legs. The three winners and the best loser advance to the semi-finals. Those and the final are the contested over two legs too.

== Clubs ==
The following ten clubs competed in the 2022 Clausura.

- Águilas de León
- El 26
- Juventus
- Leyendas
- Managua
- Real Estelí
- Somotillo
- UNAN Managua
- Walter Ferretti
- Zacarías

== Former clubs ==
- All Stars
- Caruna RL
- Diriangén
- Jalapa
- Deportivo Kol-8
- Masaya
- F.C. Ocotal
- Pinolero F.C.
- Rivas FC
- FC Santos DEI
- Saúl Álvarez
- Las Segovias
- UAM
- UCA

== Champions ==
The list of all finals:

| Tournament | Winner | Score | Runner up | Top scorer |
|---|---|---|---|---|
| 1996 | UCA | | | |
| 1997 | UCA | | | |
| 1998/99 | UCA | | UAM | |
| 1999 | UCA | | | |
| 2000 | Diriangén | | UCA | |
| 2001 | Diriangén | 2-1 | UAM | |
| 2002 | UAM | 1–0 | Estelí | |
| 2003 | Diriangén | 4–1, 6–0 | Jalapa | Claudia Mojica (64 goals) |
| 2004 | UNAN Managua | 0–1, 2–0 | Diriangén | |
| 2005 | UNAN Managua | 0–0, 0–0 aet (3–2 pen) | Estelí | Claudia Mojica (47 goals) |
| 2006 | UNAN Managua | 0–0, 1–0 aet | Las Segovias | |
| 2007 | UNAN Managua | 3–0, 4–3 | UAM | Modesta Rojas (46 goals) |
| 2008 | UNAN Managua | 0–0, 0–0 aet (4–3 pen) | UAM | Modesta Rojas (33 goals) |
| 2009 | UNAN Managua | 1–0, 2–1 | All Stars | |
| 2010 | Diriangén | 1–0, 1–2 (a) | UNAN Managua | |
| 2011 Apertura | UNAN Managua | 2–1 | Caruna RL | |
| 2012 Clausura | UNAN Managua | 1–2, 3–1 | Saúl Álvarez | Ninoska Solis (66 goals) |
| 2013 Apertura | UNAN Managua | 2–2, 3–2 | Saúl Álvarez | |
| 2014 Clausura | UNAN Managua | 0–0, 2–0 | Saúl Álvarez | |
| 2014 Apertura | Saul Alvarez | 1–0, 0–1 (4–1 pen) | UNAN Managua | Sheyla Flores (49 goals) |
| 2015 Clausura | UNAN Managua | 2–1, 3–1 | Diriangén | Sheyla Flores (76 goals) |
| 2015 Apertura | Águilas de León | 2–1, 2–2 | UNAN Managua | |
| 2016 Clausura | UNAN Managua | 4–0, 2–2 | Águilas de León | |
| 2016 Apertura | UNAN Managua | 1–0, 1–0 (3–2 pen) | Águilas de León | |
| 2017 Clausura | Águilas de León | 3–1, 2–0 (a) | UNAN Managua | |
| 2017 Apertura | Águilas de León | 1–0, 2–1 | UNAN Managua | Sheyla Flores (12 goals) |
| 2018 Clausura | UNAN Managua | 0–0 (4–2 pen) | Águilas de León | Sheyla Flores (18 goals) |
| 2018 Apertura | UNAN Managua | 2–0, 2–0 | Águilas de León | Andrea Urroz (21 goals) |
| 2019 Clausura | UNAN Managua | 4–0, 1–2 | Águilas de León | Sheyla Flores (22 goals) |
| 2019 Apertura | Águilas de León | 1–0, 0–0 | UNAN Managua | |
| 2020 Apertura | Real Estelí | 0–1, 2–2 | UNAN Managua | |
| 2021 Clausura | Real Estelí | 2–1, 3–2 (a) | UNAN Managua | Yessenia Flores (27 goals) |
| 2021 Apertura | Somotillo | 0–0, 0–0 (3–1 pen) | UNAN Managua | |
| 2022 Clausura | UNAN Managua | 2–1, 2–1 (3-1 pen) | Somotillo | |

- UAM is the team of the Universidad Americana
- UCA is the team of the Universidad Centroamericana.
- UNAN is the team of the Universidad Nacional Autónoma de Nicaragua

In July 2013 UNAN won the first Torneo Nacional de Copa del Futbol Femenino de Primera División.

=== All-time goalscorers ===
| Rank | Player | Goals |
|---|---|---|
| 1 | Sheyla Flores | 281 |
| 2 | Yessenia Flores | 200 |

== See also ==
- Women's association football around the world
