= Alexandra Pinell =

Costa Rican footballer (born 2002)

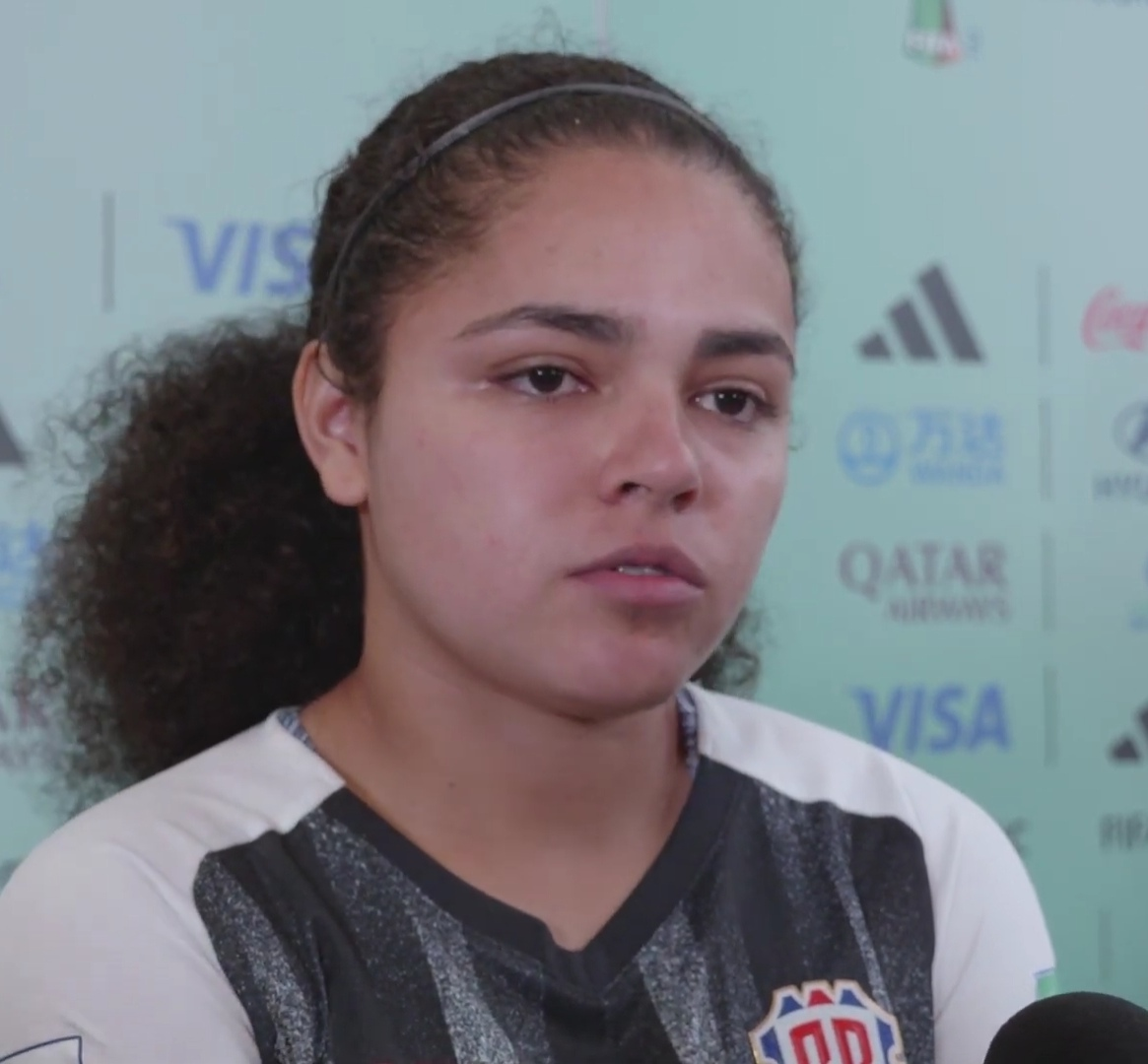
- Pinell with Costa Rica in 2022

Personal information
- Full name: Alexandra Pinell González
- Date of birth: 18 October 2002 (age 24)
- Place of birth: San Carlos, Costa Rica
- Height: 1.61 m (5 ft 3 in)
- Position: Central midfielder

Team information
- Current team: Alajuelense
- Number: 20

Senior career*
Years	Team	Apps	(Gls)
2021–	Alajuelense		

International career^{‡}
2022	Costa Rica U-20	3	(1)
2022–	Costa Rica	5	(0)
- * Club domestic league appearances and goals as of 28 May 2023 ‡ National team caps and goals as of 00:56, 4 February 2020 (UTC)

Alexandra Pinell González (born 18 October 2002) is a Costa Rican professional footballer who plays as a central midfielder for the Primera División club Alajuelense and the Costa Rica women's national team.

== Club career ==
Pinell debuted on 13 February 2021 with the Primera División club Alajuelense. Her club won the Costa Rican league title in the 2021 and 2022 Apertura and Clausura seasons.

Pinell participated in the 2022 UNCAF Women's Interclub Championship, where she debuted on 11 September 2022 against Jewel Fury in which she was lined up as a starter in a 11–0 victory, offering a goal at the 52nd minute. Alajuelense was on top of group A with 9 points, advancing to the final. On 17 September, they faced Deportivo Saprissa, where they won 1–0, earning them their first international title. On 18 December 2022, they won the Clausura 2022 final, becoming four-time champions, after beating Sporting F.C. with a score of 4–3.

== International career ==
As captain of the Costa Rican U20 squad, Pinell took part in the 2022 FIFA U-20 Women's World Cup and played in all group games, at the end of which her team was eliminated without a point. She scored the team's only goal at the tournament in her first game, a long-distance free kick that subsequently went viral internationally.

On 26 August 2022, Pinell was called up by the Costa Rican team for two friendly matches against Colombia. On 3 September 2022, she made her senior debut with the Costa Rican team against Colombia, entering at the 65th minute, the match ended with a 1–0 loss. In her second friendly match against Colombia, Pinell entered at the 72nd minute; her team also lost that match, 2–0.

On 6 July 2023, Pinell was called up to the 23-player squad to play the 2023 World Cup.

== International goals ==
No.	Date	Venue	Opponent	Score	Result	Competition
1.	25 September 2023	Estadio Alejandro Morera Soto, Alajuela, Costa Rica	Saint Kitts and Nevis	4–0	11–0	2024 CONCACAF W Gold Cup qualification
2.	4 December 2023	SKNFA Technical Center, Basseterre, Saint Kitts and Nevis	Saint Kitts and Nevis	15–0	19–0	2024 CONCACAF W Gold Cup qualification
3.	6 April 2024	Estadio Alejandro Morera Soto, Alajuela, Costa Rica	Peru	5–1	5–1	Friendly

== Honours ==
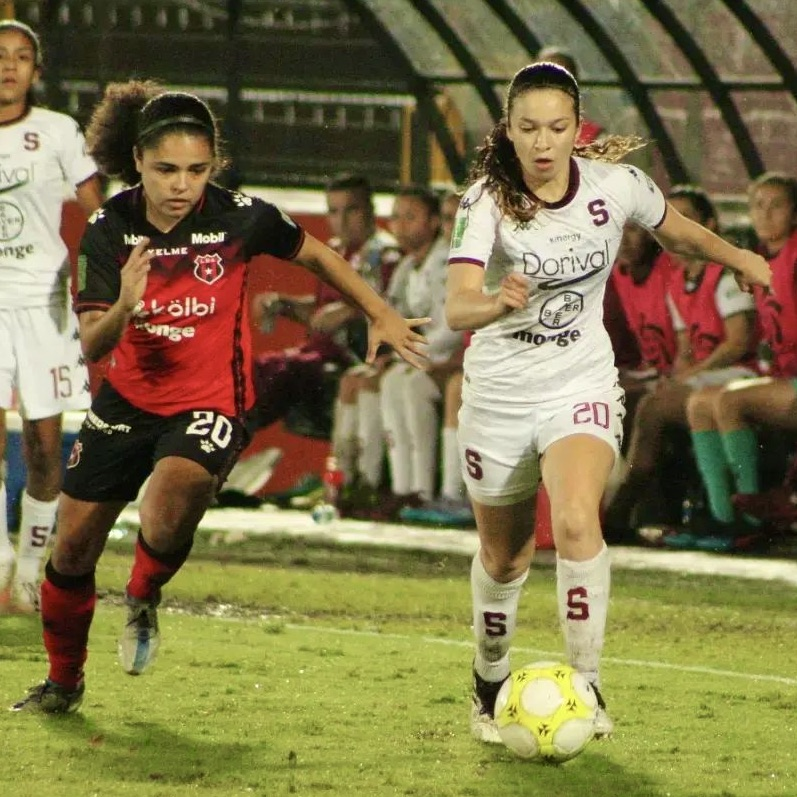
Pinell (left) in 2022

Alajuelense

- Primera División: Apertura 2021, Clausura 2021, Apertura 2022, Clausura 2022, Apertura 2023
- Costa Rican Super Cup: 2021
- UNCAF Women's Interclub Championship: 2022
