= Cinthya López =

Guatemalan footballer

Personal information
- Full name: Cinthya Gabriela López Soto
- Date of birth: 23 August 1993 (age 33)
- Place of birth: Guatemala
- Position: Midfielder

International career^{‡}
| Years | Team | Apps | (Gls) |
| 2010–2012 | Guatemala U20 | 6 | (1) |
| 2010–2013 | Guatemala | 18 | (0) |
- ‡ National team caps and goals as of 20 October 2014

Cinthya Gabriela López Soto (born 23 August 1993) is a Guatemalan footballer who plays as a midfielder. She has been a member of the Guatemala women's national team.
