= University of San Pedro Sula =

- Universidad de San Pedro Sula
- Other name: USAP
- Motto: Sapidus, Veritatis, Honore
- Type: Private
- Established: 1977
- President: Ricardo J. Jaar (Executive President)
- Rector: Senén E. Villanueva
- Location: San Pedro Sula, Honduras
- Campus: Urban
- Website: www.usap.edu

The University of San Pedro Sula (USAP) is a private university located in San Pedro Sula, Honduras. Established on November 15, 1977, as the result of an initiative of prominent entrepreneurs, professionals, and cultural leaders, led by Jorge E. Jaar, who envisioned the creation of the country's first private university during a business round table in San Pedro Sula. It was the first private university in Honduras, it began operations on December 1, 1977. It offers a range of undergraduate, technical, and graduate programs.

== History ==
USAP was founded by a group of entrepreneurs led by Jorge Emilio Jaar.

== Academics ==
USAP currently offers more than 30 academic programs across various disciplines.

=== Undergraduate Programs ===
- Architecture (STEM)
- Agricultural Business Engineering (STEM)
- Business Administration
- Financial and Banking Administration
- Strategic Human Talent Management
- Business Management and Entrepreneurship
- Commercial Engineering (STEM)
- Communication Sciences and Advertising
- Industrial Engineering (STEM)
- Operations and Logistics Engineering (STEM)
- Industrial and Process Management Engineering (STEM)
- Industrial and Systems Engineering (STEM)
- Electronic Technology Engineering (STEM)
- Law
- Graphic Design (STEM)
- Animation and Digital Design Engineering
- Marketing
- Marketing and Digital Design
- Marketing and Digital Media
- Tourism Administration
- Data Analytics and Business Intelligence Engineering (STEM)
- Computer Technology Engineering (STEM)
- Information and Communication Technologies Engineering (STEM)
- Application Development Engineering (STEM)
- Administrative Informatics (STEM)
- Information Technology Administration (STEM)
- E-Business (STEM)

=== Technical Degrees ===
- University Technician in Production Management
- University Technician in Graphic Design
- University Technician in Sales Management
- University Technician in Tourism
- University Technician in Big Data (STEM)

=== Master's Degrees ===
- Master in Industrial Administration (STEM)
- Master's in Civil Procedural Law
- Master in Business Management and Administration
- Professional Specialty in Data Science and Business Analytics (STEM)

== Innovation and Sustainability ==
Its main campus generates nearly 50% of its energy through solar panels and hosts a protected forest that helps offset more than 390 tons of CO_{2} annually. The institution also promotes electric vehicle use and sustainable mobility in its operations and academic offerings.

== Electromobility Leadership ==
In 2024, USAP launched the country’s first academic diploma in electromobility, in collaboration with iMotors and the electric vehicle brand Maxus.

== Media and Innovation Initiatives ==
USAP is home to CampusTV, the first high-definition television station in Honduras. Created in 2008, it supports educational and cultural content while serving as a learning platform for communications and journalism students.

== Social Impact and Recognition ==
USAP was awarded the *La Concordia* recognition in 2006 by the Deutsche Gesellschaft für Internationale Zusammenarbeit (GIZ/GTZ) for its outstanding work in corporate social responsibility.

USAP is also a founding member of the Fundación Hondureña de Responsabilidad Social Empresarial (FUNDAHRSE). It has received the "Sello Verde" distinction from the Municipality of San Pedro Sula for its sustainability leadership.

== University Leadership ==
- Executive President: Ricardo J. Jaar
- Rector: Senén E. Villanueva
