= Mayqueling Márquez =

Nicaraguan footballer

Personal information
- Full name: Nuria Mayqueling Márquez Medina
- Date of birth: 29 February 2000 (age 26)
- Place of birth: León, Nicaragua
- Position: Right midfielder

Team information
- Current team: Alianza

Youth career
- 2015: ADFA San Miguel
- 201?: Real Estelí

Senior career*
Years	Team	Apps	(Gls)
2017–2019	Real Estelí		
2019–2020	Águila		
2020–	Alianza		

International career^{‡}
2021–	Nicaragua	3	(1)
- * Club domestic league appearances and goals ‡ National team caps and goals as of 22 February 2022.

Nuria Mayqueling Márquez Medina (born 29 February 2000). known as Mayqueling Márquez, is a Nicaraguan footballer who plays as a right midfielder for Salvadoran club Alianza FC and the Nicaragua women's national team.

== Early life ==
Márquez was born in León. When she was 9, she lived for some months in San Miguel, El Salvador. During that time, she played her first football match, being part of a men's team. She returned to San Miguel at 15 and played for women's youth team ADFA. After that, she went back to Nicaragua, where she finished her youth career at Real Estelí FC, which would later promote her to the first team.

== Club career ==
Márquez has played for the first team of Nicaraguan club Real Estelí FC for two years. In 2019, she returned once more to El Salvador to play for CD Águila at that year Apertura tournament. In 2020, she moved to fellow Salvadoran club Alianza.

== International career ==
In January 2021, Márquez stated one of her football dreams was to represent El Salvador. However, she made her senior debut for Nicaragua three months later, on 8 April 2021, as a 42nd-minute substitution in a 2–0 friendly away win over precisely El Salvador.

=== International goals ===
Scores and results list Nicaragua's goal tally first

No.	Date	Venue	Opponent	Score	Result	Competition .
1.	22 February 2022	Estadio Nacional, Managua, Nicaragua	Turks and Caicos Islands	15–0	19–0	2022 CONCACAF W Championship qualification
2.	1 December 2025	Leonora National Track & Field Center, West Coast Demerara, Guyana	Guyana	2–1	3–1	2026 CONCACAF W Championship qualification
3.	2 March 2026	Estadio Nacional, Managua, Nicaragua	Jamaica	2–3	2–3	2026 CONCACAF W Championship qualification
4.	18 April 2026	Estadio Nacional, Managua, Nicaragua	Dominica	1–0	14–0	2026 CONCACAF W Championship qualification
5.	18 April 2026	Estadio Nacional, Managua, Nicaragua	Dominica	5–0	14–0	2026 CONCACAF W Championship qualification
