= List of Nicaragua women's international footballers =

This is a non-exhaustive list of Nicaragua women's international footballers – association football players who have appeared at least once for the senior Nicaragua women's national football team.

== Players ==
Key
**Bold**	Named to the national team in the past year

Name	Caps	Goals	National team years	Club(s)
**Bethania Aburto**	5	0	–	(Nicaragua) Saúl Álvarez
Julissa Acevedo	–	–	–	Unknown
**Doriana Aguilar**	5	3	–	(Nicaragua) Real Estelí
Jansy Aguirre	–	–	–	Unknown
**Elizabeth Arcia**	7	0	–	(Nicaragua) UNAN Managua
Kelly Ávalos	–	–	–	Unknown
**Josseling Berríos**	4	1	–	(Nicaragua) UNAN Managua
Francis Bravo	7	0	2010	Unknown
Gelsi Caballero	1	0	2019	Unknown
Ana Cate	10	2	2010–2014	Unattached
**Dayana Calero**	5	0	2021–	Unknown
**Alys Cruz**	7	0	–	(Nicaragua) UNAN Managua
Celeste Escobar	–	–	–	Unknown
Sheyla Flores	–	–	–	Unknown
Wendy Flores	–	–	–	Unknown
**Yessenia Flores**	4	1	–	(Nicaragua) Real Estelí
**Ángela Gutiérrez**	2	0	–	(Nicaragua) UNAN Managua
Merly Hernández	–	–	–	Unknown
**Reyna Hernández**	2	0	–	(Nicaragua) UNAN Managua
**Yorcelly Humphreys**	4	0	–	(Nicaragua) UNAN Managua
**Kathering Jarquín**	1	0	–	(Nicaragua) UNAN Managua
Jennifer Leiva	6	0	2010	Retired
Andrea López	–	–	–	Unknown
**Diana López**	1	0	–	(Nicaragua) UNAN Managua
Virginia Lovo	–	–	–	Unknown
Melissa Manzanares	11	0	2010–2013	Unknown
**Mayqueling Márquez**	2	0	2021–	(El Salvador) Alianza
Fabiola Martínez	–	–	–	Unknown
**Heysell Martínez**	2	0	–	(Nicaragua) Real Estelí
Kyra Montes	1	0	2019	Unattached
Meyling Morales	10	0	2010–2011	Unknown
Xaviera Morales	–	–	–	Unknown
**Lisbeth Moreno**	3	0	–	(Nicaragua) Real Estelí
Emely Obregón	2	0	2019	(United States) Colorado Mesa Mavericks
Natalie Orellana	1	0	2018	(Canada) Keyano Huskies
Cinthya Orozco	–	–	–	Unknown
**Diana Ortega**	3	0	–	(Nicaragua) UNAN Managua
Katherine Pereira	–	–	–	Unknown
Kesly Pérez	–	–	–	Unknown
Maryury Pérez	3	0	2010–2011	Unknown
Jonnie Sánchez	2	0	2018–2019	(United States) Southern Utah Thunderbirds
**Oisis Sediles**	1	0	–	(Nicaragua) Águilas de León
**Martha Silva**	7	4	–	(Nicaragua) Somotillo
Nathaly Silva	2	0	2019	(United States) Long Beach City Vikings
Ninoska Solís	–	–	–	Unknown
Shanelly Treminio	–	–	–	Unknown
**Katherine Vargas**	1	0	–	(Nicaragua) Águilas de León
Liz Vega	4	0	2018–2019	Unattached
Gema Zúñiga	–	–	–	Unknown

== See also ==
- Nicaragua women's national football team
