= Viviana Chinchilla =

Costa Rican footballer (born 1994)

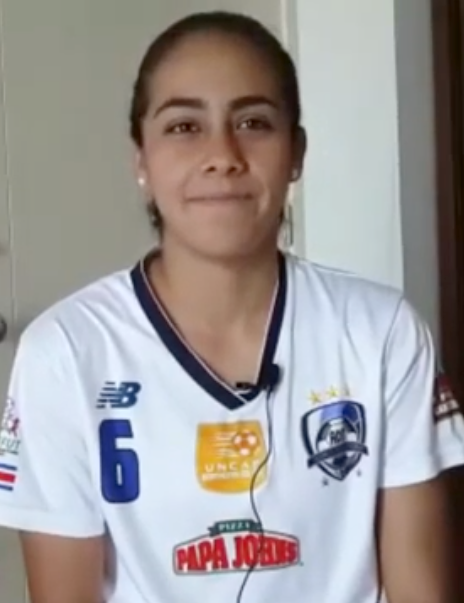
- In a 2018 interview

Personal information
- Full name: Viviana Chinchilla Ramón
- Date of birth: 21 December 1994 (age 31)
- Height: 1.64 m (5 ft 5 in)
- Position: Midfielder

Team information
- Current team: Liga Deportiva Alajuelense

Senior career*
Years	Team	Apps	(Gls)
- UCEM Alajuela
- Liga Deportiva Alajuelense

International career^{‡}
2014	Costa Rica U20	3	(0)
2014–	Costa Rica	1	(0)
- * Club domestic league appearances and goals ‡ National team caps and goals as of 15 July 2019

Viviana Chinchilla Ramón (born 21 December 1994) is a Costa Rican footballer who plays as a midfielder for Liga Deportiva Alajuelense and the Costa Rica women's national team.

== International career ==
Chinchilla represented Costa Rica at the 2014 FIFA U-20 Women's World Cup. At senior level, she played the 2014 Central American and Caribbean Games.
