= Anuvis Angulo =

Panamanian footballer (born 2001)

Personal information
- Full name: Anuvis Anays Angulo Castillo
- Date of birth: 3 May 2001 (age 25)
- Position: Forward

International career^{‡}
Years	Team	Apps	(Gls)
2018	Panama	2	(0)
- ‡ National team caps and goals as of 9 July 2019

Anuvis Anays Angulo Castillo (born 3 May 2001) is a Panamanian footballer who plays as a forward for the Panama women's national team.

== International career ==
Angulo appeared in one match for Panama at the 2018 CONCACAF Women's Championship.

== See also ==
- List of Panama women's international footballers
