= Yessenia Flores =

Nicaraguan footballer

Personal information
- Full name: Yessenia del Socorro Flores Rivas
- Date of birth: 7 July 1999 (age 27)
- Place of birth: Villa Fraternidad, Managua, Nicaragua
- Position: Midfielder

Youth career
- Falcons de Managua

Senior career*
Years	Team	Apps	(Gls)
2022–2023	Saprissa		

International career
2011	Nicaragua U17	2	(0)
2018	Nicaragua U20	3	(1)
2014–	Nicaragua	24	(30)
- * Club domestic league appearances and goals

Yessenia del Socorro Flores Rivas (born 7 July 1999) is a Nicaraguan footballer who plays as a midfielder for the Nicaragua women's national team.

== Early and personal life ==
Flores was born in the Villa Fraternidad neighborhood of Managua to Juan Flores and Yessenia Rivas. Her elder sister Sheyla is also a footballer.

== Club career ==
=== Saprissa ===
In April 2022, Flores signed with Costa Rican team Deportivo Saprissa. She left the club in August 2023.

== International career ==
During the 2022 CONCACAF W Championship qualification, Flores scored 6 goals in a 19–0 victory for Nicaragua against the Turks and Caicos Islands.

== International goals ==
Scores and results list Nicaragua's goal tally first

No.	Date	Venue	Opponent	Score	Result	Competition .
1.	6 December 2017	Estadio Independencia, Estelí, Nicaragua	El Salvador	2–1	2–1	2017 Central American Games
2.	8 December 2017	Estadio Independencia, Estelí, Nicaragua	Panama	3–0	3–1	2017 Central American Games
3.	22 July 2018	Estadio Moderno Julio Torres, Barranquilla, Colombia	Trinidad and Tobago	1–2	2–2	2018 Central American and Caribbean Games
4.	22 July 2018	Estadio Moderno Julio Torres, Barranquilla, Colombia	Trinidad and Tobago	2–2	2–2	2018 Central American and Caribbean Games
5.	17 February 2022	Hasely Crawford Stadium, Port of Spain, Trinidad and Tobago	Trinidad and Tobago	1–2	1–2	2022 CONCACAF W Championship qualification
6.	22 February 2022	Estadio Nacional de Fútbol, Managua, Nicaragua	Turks and Caicos Islands	3–0	19–0	2022 CONCACAF W Championship qualification
7.	22 February 2022	Estadio Nacional de Fútbol, Managua, Nicaragua	Turks and Caicos Islands	4–0	19–0	2022 CONCACAF W Championship qualification
8.	22 February 2022	Estadio Nacional de Fútbol, Managua, Nicaragua	Turks and Caicos Islands	7–0	19–0	2022 CONCACAF W Championship qualification
9.	22 February 2022	Estadio Nacional de Fútbol, Managua, Nicaragua	Turks and Caicos Islands	10–0	19–0	2022 CONCACAF W Championship qualification
10.	22 February 2022	Estadio Nacional de Fútbol, Managua, Nicaragua	Turks and Caicos Islands	13–0	19–0	2022 CONCACAF W Championship qualification
11.	22 February 2022	Estadio Nacional de Fútbol, Managua, Nicaragua	Turks and Caicos Islands	14–0	19–0	2022 CONCACAF W Championship qualification
12.	12 April 2022	Estadio Nacional de Fútbol, Managua, Nicaragua	Dominica	1–0	10–0	2022 CONCACAF W Championship qualification
13.	12 April 2022	Estadio Nacional de Fútbol, Managua, Nicaragua	Dominica	3–0	10–0	2022 CONCACAF W Championship qualification
14.	12 April 2022	Estadio Nacional de Fútbol, Managua, Nicaragua	Dominica	5–0	10–0	2022 CONCACAF W Championship qualification
15.	12 April 2022	Estadio Nacional de Fútbol, Managua, Nicaragua	Dominica	7–0	10–0	2022 CONCACAF W Championship qualification
16.	29 October 2023	Estadio Nacional de Fútbol, Managua, Nicaragua	Martinique	1–0	1–1	2024 CONCACAF W Gold Cup qualification
17.	3 December 2023	Estadio Jorge "El Mágico" González, San Salvador, El Salvador	El Salvador	1–0	1–4	2024 CONCACAF W Gold Cup qualification
18.	18 April 2026	Estadio Nacional, Managua, Nicaragua	Dominica	7–0	14–0	2026 CONCACAF W Championship qualification
19.	18 April 2026	Estadio Nacional, Managua, Nicaragua	Dominica	9–0	14–0	2026 CONCACAF W Championship qualification
20.	18 April 2026	Estadio Nacional, Managua, Nicaragua	Dominica	11–0	14–0	2026 CONCACAF W Championship qualification
21.	18 April 2026	Estadio Nacional, Managua, Nicaragua	Dominica	13–0	14–0	2026 CONCACAF W Championship qualification
