= Cristina Torres =

Puerto Rican footballer (born 2000)

Personal information
- Full name: Cristina María Torres Malinow
- Date of birth: October 3, 2000 (age 26)
- Place of birth: Puerto Rico
- Height: 1.69 m (5 ft 7 in)
- Positions: Attacking midfielder; winger

Team information
- Current team: UNAM
- Number: 10

Senior career*
Years	Team	Apps	(Gls)
2015–2017	Bayamón FC	13	(3)
2018–2022	Puerto Rico Sol	31	(19)
2020	→ EC Bastiais (loan)	1	(1)
2021	→ Detroit City (loan)	6	(3)
2023–2024	Mazatlán	41	(4)
2024–	UNAM	53	(3)

International career^{‡}
2015–2016	Puerto Rico U17	2	(0)
2017–2019	Puerto Rico U20	4	(3)
2019–	Puerto Rico	6	(4)
- * Club domestic league appearances and goals as of January 31, 2026 ‡ National team caps and goals as of May 4, 2020

Cristina María Torres Malinow (born October 3, 2000) is a Puerto Rican professional footballer who plays as an attacking midfielder for Liga MX Femenil club UNAM and the Puerto Rico women's national team.

== Club career ==
On 23 July 2016, Torres made her full debut for the Bayamon first team in the Liga PR against Metropolitan FC, scoring her first goal just 22 minutes into the match.

In June 2018, she joined Liga PR side Puerto Rico Sol. She made 31 starts for the club, scoring 19 goals.

In October 2020, Torres joined EC Bastia on three-month loan.

In May 2021, Torres joined Detroit City FC on three-month loan.

Torres signed with Liga MX Femenil club Mazatlán in December 2022.

== International career ==
Torres made her senior Puerto Rico debut in August 2018, in a 0–3 friendly loss to Argentina in Mayaguez. On September 3, 2018, Torres scored a goal as Puerto Rico tied Argentina 1-1. On June 14, 2019, Torres scored a goal in 2–1 loss to Bolivia.

== Honors ==
- 2018/19 Liga PR Champion
- 2019/20 Liga PR Champion
