= Sofía Varela =

Costa Rican footballer (born 1998)

Personal information
- Full name: Sofía Varela Espinoza
- Date of birth: 28 March 1998 (age 28)
- Place of birth: San Carlos, Costa Rica
- Height: 1.59 m (5 ft 3 in)
- Position: Forward

Youth career
- Fortuna de Desamparados

Senior career*
Years	Team	Apps	(Gls)
- Saprissa
2022–2023	Santos Laguna	25	(8)

International career^{‡}
2014	Costa Rica U17	3	(1)
2014–2018	Costa Rica U20	2	(0)
2019–	Costa Rica	1	(0)
Medal record
Women's football
Representing Costa Rica
Pan American Games
Bronze medal – third place	2019 Lima	Team
- * Club domestic league appearances and goals ‡ National team caps and goals as of 28 July 2019

Sofía Varela Espinoza (born 28 March 1998) is a Costa Rican footballer who plays as a forward for the Costa Rica women's national team.

== International goals ==
No.	Date	Venue	Opponent	Score	Result	Competition
1.	21 October 2025	Cementos Progreso Stadium, Guatemala City, Guatemala	Panama	1–0	2–1	2025 Central American Games
2.	29 October 2025	Cementos Progreso Stadium, Guatemala City, Guatemala	El Salvador	1–0	1–0	2025 Central American Games
