= Paola Calderón =

Salvadoran footballer (born 2002)

Personal information
- Full name: Lesly Paola Calderón Valle
- Date of birth: 19 March 2002 (age 24)
- Place of birth: Santa Rita, El Salvador
- Position: Forward

Team information
- Current team: Alianza Women

Senior career*
Years	Team	Apps	(Gls)
2017–2019	ADLegend's	9	(14)
2020–2021	FAS Femenina	30	(40)
2021-2022	Alianza Women	6	(24)
2023	Pérez Zeledon	9	(4)
2024–2025	Metapán Women	1	(1)
2025–	Alianza Women	23	(63)

International career^{‡}
- El Salvador U15
- El Salvador U17
2019–	El Salvador	2	(0)
Medal record
Women's football
Representing El Salvador
Central American and Caribbean Games
Bronze medal – third place	2023 San Salvador
- * Club domestic league appearances and goals ‡ National team caps and goals as of 8 October 2019.

Lesly Paola Calderón Valle (born 19 March 2002) is a Salvadoran footballer who plays as a forward for Alianza Women and El Salvador women's national team.

== Early life ==
Calderón was born in Santa Rita, Chalatenango.

== Club career ==
Calderón has played for AD Legend’s and FAS in El Salvador.

== International career ==
Calderón capped for El Salvador at senior level during the 2020 CONCACAF Women's Olympic Qualifying Championship qualification.

== See also ==
- List of El Salvador women's international footballers
