= Cristín Granados =

Costa Rican footballer (born 1989)

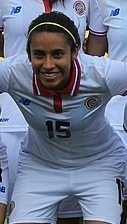
- Granados with Costa Rica in 2015

Personal information
- Full name: Cristín Yorleny Granados Gómez
- Date of birth: 19 August 1989 (age 37)
- Place of birth: San Rafael, Oreamuno, Costa Rica
- Height: 1.63 m (5 ft 4 in)
- Position: Midfielder

Team information
- Current team: Sporting San José

Youth career
- 2007–2010: FF Arenal Coronado

College career
Years	Team	Apps	(Gls)
2011–2012	VCU Rams		
2013	South Florida Bulls		

Senior career*
Years	Team	Apps	(Gls)
2014–2016	Saprissa		
2016–2018	AD Moravia		
2018	Junior		
2018	Tacón	6	(1)
2019–2022	AD Moravia		
2022–	Sporting San José		

International career^{‡}
2006–2023	Costa Rica	56	(10)
- * Club domestic league appearances and goals as of 2 December 2019 ‡ National team caps and goals as of 17:37, 18 June 2015 (UTC)

Cristín Yorleny Granados Gómez (born 19 August 1989) is a Costa Rican footballer who plays as a midfielder for Sporting San José and the Costa Rica women's national team.

== Honours ==
Costa Rica

Winner

- Central American Games: 2013

== See also ==
- List of women's footballers with 100 or more international caps
