= Sheyla Flores =

Nicaraguan footballer

Personal information
- Full name: Sheyla Guadalupe Flores Rivas
- Date of birth: 15 May 1998 (age 28)
- Place of birth: Villa Fraternidad, Managua, Nicaragua
- Position: Forward

Team information
- Current team: Real Esteli

Youth career
- 2006: Falcons de Managua

Senior career*
Years	Team	Apps	(Gls)
2011–2016	UNAN Managua	28	(162)
2016–2018	Águilas de León	30	(75)
2018–2019	Alianza	9	(26)
2019	UNAN Managua	14	(38)
2020	Saprissa		
2020–2022	Real Estelí	2	(3)
2022–2023	Saprissa	24	(4)
2024	Real Esteli	3	(3)

International career
2011	Nicaragua U17	2	(1)
2018	Nicaragua U20	3	(0)
2014–	Nicaragua	26	(11)
- * Club domestic league appearances and goals

Sheyla Guadalupe Flores Rivas (born 15 May 1998) is a Nicaraguan footballer who plays as a forward for Real Esteli and the Nicaragua women's national team.

== Club career ==
In 2015, the 17-year-old Flores set a Nicaraguan women's football record, scoring a total of 72 goals for UNAN Managua across the 2014 Apertura and 2015 Clausura, surpassing Ninoska Solís's previous record of 66 goals.

In 2016, Flores signed with FC Águilas de León.

In October 2018, Flores signed with Salvadoran team Alianza F.C., becoming the first foreign footballer to play in Liga Mayor de Fútbol Femenina. She ended the regular season with 20 goals from 7 games.

In 2019, Flores rejoined UNAN Managua.

In January 2020, Flores signed with Costa Rican team Deportivo Saprissa. In July the same year, she returned to Nicaragua to join Real Estelí.

In April 2022, she rejoined Saprissa, signing alongside her younger sister Yessenia. She left the club in August 2023.

== International career ==
In 2011, a 13-year-old Flores played twice for the Nicaragua women's national under-17 football team, scoring in a 2–1 home loss to Panama.

== International goals ==
Scores and results list Nicaragua's goal tally first

No.	Date	Venue	Opponent	Score	Result	Competition	Ref.
1	6 October 2019	Estadio Alejandro Morera Soto, Alajuela, Costa Rica	El Salvador	2–1	2–1	2020 CONCACAF Women's Olympic Qualifying Championship qualification	
2	22 February 2022	Estadio Nacional de Fútbol, Managua, Nicaragua	Turks and Caicos Islands	12–0	19–0	2022 CONCACAF W Championship qualification	
3	23 October 2025	Cementos Progreso Stadium, Guatemala City, Guatemala	Guatemala	1–0	3–1	2025 Central American Games	
4	27 November 2025	Sir Vivian Richards Stadium, St. John’s, Antigua and Barbuda	Antigua and Barbuda	2–0	4–0	2026 CONCACAF W Championship qualification	
5	1 December 2025	Leonora National Track & Field Center, West Coast Demerara, Guyana	Guyana	1–0	3–1	2026 CONCACAF W Championship qualification	
6	2 March 2026	Estadio Nacional, Managua, Nicaragua	Jamaica	1–0	3–2	2026 CONCACAF W Championship qualification	
7	18 April 2026	Estadio Nacional, Managua, Nicaragua	Dominica	4–0	14–0	2026 CONCACAF W Championship qualification	

== Personal life ==
Flores' sister Yessenia also plays for the Nicaragua women's national football team.
