= Vivian Herrera =

Guatemalan footballer (born 1996)

Personal information
- Full name: Vivian Andrea Herrera Mejía
- Date of birth: 6 May 1996 (age 30)
- Position: Midfielder

Team information
- Current team: Unifut Rosal

Senior career*
Years	Team	Apps	(Gls)
- Unifut Rosal

International career^{‡}
2012	Guatemala U17	3	(1)
2011	Guatemala U20	2	(0)
2019–	Guatemala	2	(0)
- * Club domestic league appearances and goals ‡ National team caps and goals as of 8 October 2019

Vivian “Vivi” Andrea Herrera Mejía (born 6 May 1996) is a Guatemalan footballer who plays as a midfielder for Unifut Rosal and the Guatemala women's national team.
