= Cementos Progreso Stadium =

Stadium in Guatemala City

Estadio Cementos Progreso
- El Cementos Progreso
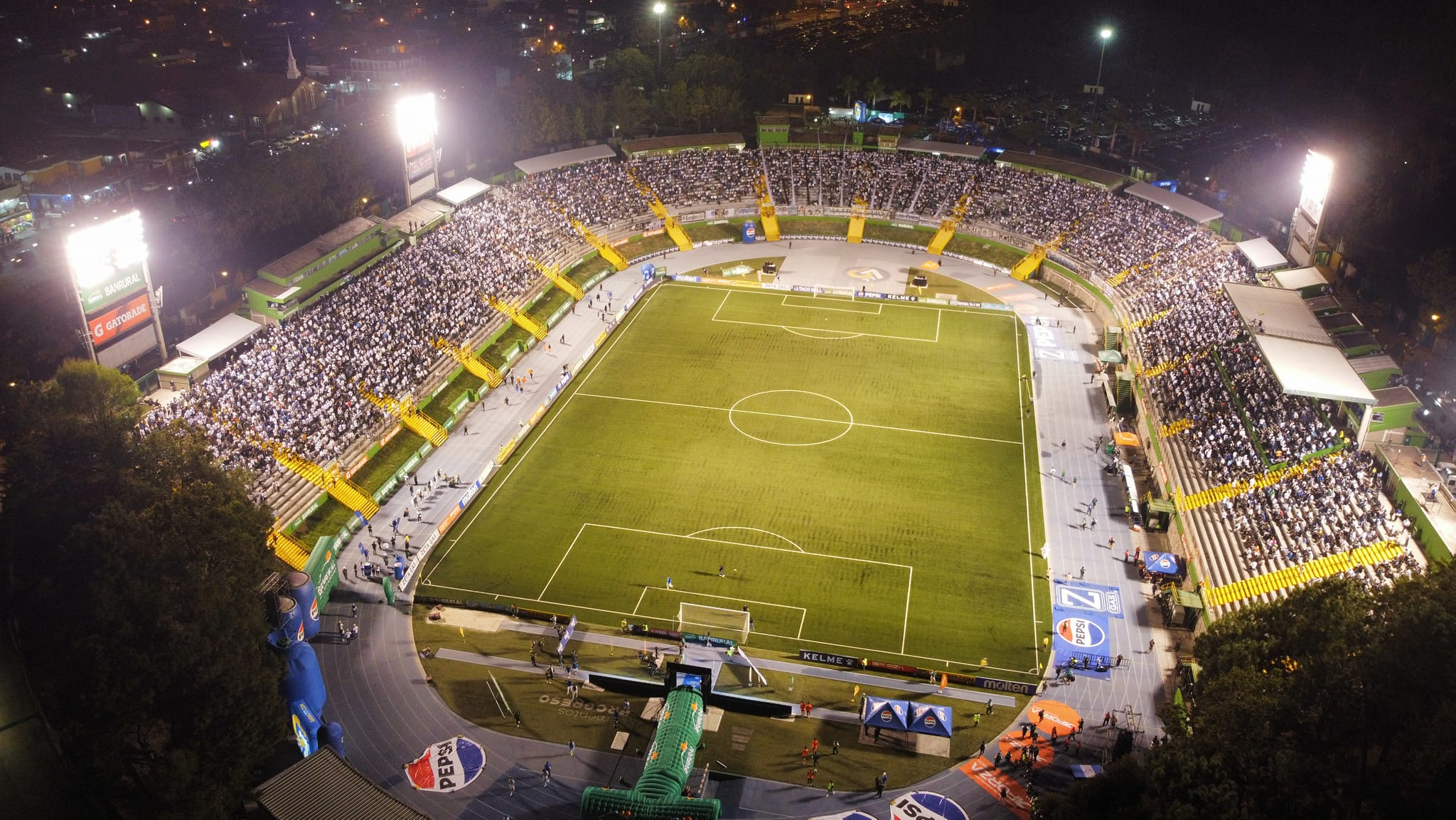
- The Estadio Cementos Progreso at night
- Interactive map of Estadio Cementos Progreso
- Former names: Estadio La Pedrera
- Location: Guatemala City, Guatemala
- Coordinates: 14°40′33.88″N 90°29′18.77″W
- Owner: Cementos Progreso
- Capacity: 17,000
- Surface: Artificial turf
- Field size: 104 m × 68 m (341 ft × 223 ft)

Construction
- Opened: 10 November 1991
- Cost: Q13 million

Tenants
- Cremas B (2011–2022); Comunicaciones FC (2024–present); Guatemala national football team (2025)

The Cementos Progreso Stadium (Spanish: Estadio Cementos Progreso) is a multi-use stadium in Guatemala City. It is also known popularly as Estadio La Pedrera in reference to its location in the neighborhood of the same name in the Zone 6 of the Guatemalan capital. It was built in 1991 and is named after Cementos Progreso, a local cement manufacturer.

Inaugurated on 10 November 1991, the stadium is used mostly for football (soccer) matches, it has hosted international home matches of the Guatemala national football team, and it is the home venue for Liga Nacional club Comunicaciones. It has a capacity of 17,000 seats, being the third-largest stadium in Guatemala after the Estadio Doroteo Guamuch Flores and Estadio Israel Barrios.

Originally of natural grass, its field was changed to artificial turf in 2010. It is surrounded by a tartan athletic track, the first ever installed in the country, which complies with IAAF regulations.

== See also ==
- Lists of stadiums
