= Nicaragua National Football Stadium =

Football stadium in Managua, Nicaragua

Coordinates: 12°06′33″N 86°16′23″W

Estadio Nacional de Fútbol de Nicaragua
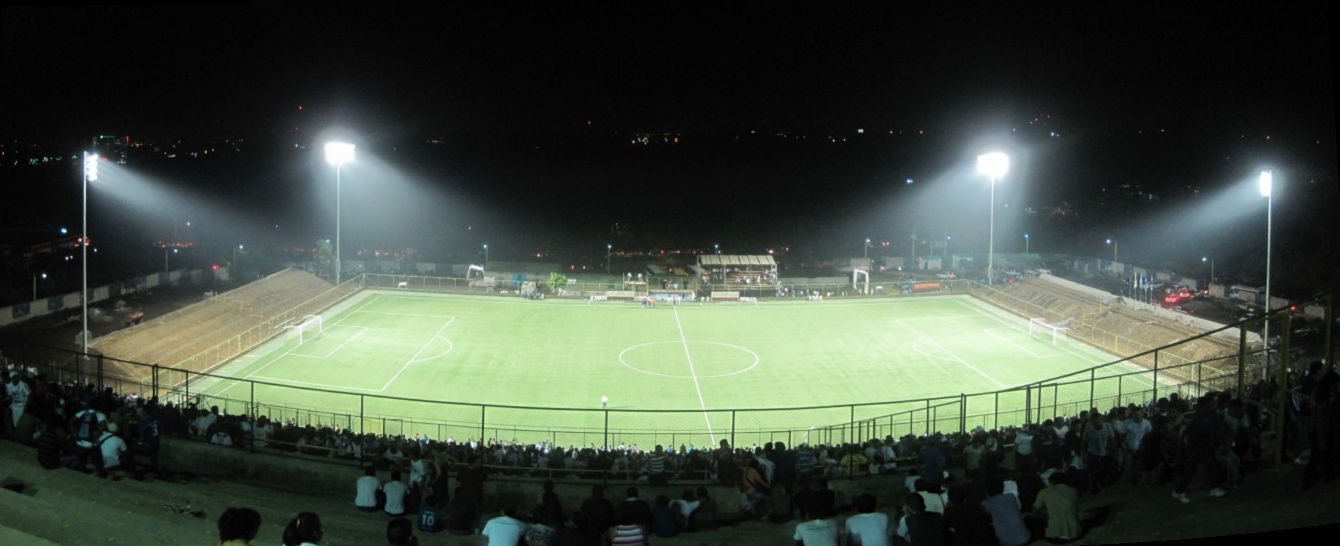
- Panoramic view of the stadium in 2011
- Interactive map of Estadio Nacional de Fútbol de Nicaragua
- Full name: Nicaragua National Football Stadium
- Location: Managua, Nicaragua
- Capacity: 20,000 (currently)
- Surface: Artificial Turf
- Record attendance: 20,000 Nicaragua vs Jamaica, September 8, 2015 ( 2018 FIFA World Cup Qualification)

Construction
- Opened: April 14, 2011

Tenants
- Nicaragua national football team (2011–present); UNAN Managua; Managua FC; Walter Ferretti

The Nicaragua National Football Stadium (Estadio Nacional de Fútbol) in Managua, Nicaragua, is home to the Nicaragua national football team. The official ribbon-cutting ceremony, attended by FIFA president Sepp Blatter, occurred on April 14, 2011. The first official game was a men's national team match featuring Nicaragua and Panama in a FIFA World Cup 2014 qualifying match, on September 6, 2011.

== Overview ==
Envisioned to be built as the most modern stadium in Central America, only the first stage of construction has been completed as of April 2011. This first stage included building of the playing surface, locker rooms for teams and officials, and a main grandstand. Second and future stages include end zone stands (under construction) as well as a media center and press box.

The national Football stadium is sometimes confused with the old National Stadium, Estadio Dennis Martinez in central Managua. That stadium was built in 1948, primarily as a baseball stadium. And it was in fact a stadium used by the national team before the construction of the current stadium. Football has a growing popularity among Nicaraguans and has forced its voice in securing a new stadium of its own.
