= 2016 CONCACAF Women's U-17 Championship squads =

The final 20 player roster listings were published on 2 March 2016.

== Canada ==
No.	Pos.	Player	Date of birth (age)	Club
1	GK	Lysianne Proulx		(Canadian Soccer Association) Varennes
18	GK	Marissa Zucchetto		(Canadian Soccer Association) Unionville Milliken SC
16	DF	Ashley Cathro		(Canadian Soccer Association) Vancouver Whitecaps REX
6	DF	Samantha Chang		(Canadian Soccer Association) Unionville Milliken SC
13	DF	Nadège L’Espérance		(Canadian Soccer Association) Lakeshore SC
5	DF	Kennedy Faulknor		(Canadian Soccer Association) Unionville Milliken SC
3	DF	Julia Grosso		(Canadian Soccer Association) Vancouver Whitecaps FC
2	DF	Emma Regan		(Canadian Soccer Association) Vancouver Whitecaps REX
4	MF	Nahida Baalbaki		(Canadian Soccer Association) Saint-Leonard
10	MF	Anyssa Ibrahim		(Canadian Soccer Association) Varennes
12	MF	Vital Kats		(Canadian Soccer Association) GS United
14	MF	Caitlin Shaw		(Canadian Soccer Association) Vancouver Whitecaps REX
8	MF	Sarah Stratigakis		(Canadian Soccer Association) Unionville Milliken SC
17	FW	Teni Akindoju		(Canadian Soccer Association) Halifax Dunbrack SC
7	FW	Shana Flynn		(Canadian Soccer Association) Unionville Milliken SC
11	FW	Camila Gomez		(Canadian Soccer Association) Vancouver Whitecaps REX
9	FW	Jordyn Huitema		(Canadian Soccer Association) Vancouver Whitecaps REX
15	FW	Lauren Raimondo		(Canadian Soccer Association) Unionville Milliken SC
20	FW	Jayde Riviere		(Canadian Soccer Association) Markham SC
19	FW	Aaliyah Scott		(Canadian Soccer Association) Toronto Skillz FC

== Costa Rica ==
No.	Pos.	Player	Date of birth (age)	Club
	GK	Yendry Rojas		(Costa Rican Football Federation) UCEM
	GK	Valeria Román		(Costa Rican Football Federation) Saprissa
	GK	Akira Rubi		(Costa Rican Football Federation) Moravia
	DF	Stephannie Blanco		(Costa Rican Football Federation) Arenal
	DF	Valeria Del Campo		(Costa Rican Football Federation) Saprissa
	DF	Fabiola Lobo		(Costa Rican Football Federation) Pococi
	DF	Ziuliani Rodríguez		(Costa Rican Football Federation) Moravia
	DF	Yedry Salas		(Costa Rican Football Federation) Puntarenas
	DF	María Fer Sanabria		(Costa Rican Football Federation) Guatuso
	MF	Carmen Marín		(Canadian Soccer Association) Futuro Soccer Academy.
	MF	Pamela Mora		(Costa Rican Football Federation) UCEM
	MF	Irela Rodríguez		(Costa Rican Football Federation) Saprissa
	MF	Sabrina Vásquez		(Costa Rican Football Federation) Moravia
	MF	Gloriana Villalobos		(Costa Rican Football Federation) Saprissa
	MF	Emma Víquez		(United States Soccer Federation) Dallas
	FW	Mereilyn Alvarado		(Costa Rican Football Federation) Moravia
	FW	Priscila Chinchilla		(Costa Rican Football Federation) Perez Zeledón
	FW	Hillary Corrales		(Costa Rican Football Federation) Dimas Escazú
	FW	María Paula Salas		(Costa Rican Football Federation) Saprissa
	FW	Viviana Villalobos		(Costa Rican Football Federation) Dimas Escazú

== Grenada ==
No.	Pos.	Player	Date of birth (age)	Club
	GK	Holly Charles		(Grenada Football Association) MDC
	GK	Judy McIntosh		(Grenada Football Association) SMSS
	DF	Abigail Adewunmi		(Grenada Football Association) SJCSG
	DF	Resheda Charles		(Grenada Football Association) SRMSS
	DF	Jasmine Joseph		(United States Soccer Federation) Phillipsburg High Sch
	DF	Smantha McSween		(Grenada Football Association) MDC
	DF	Erin Sylvester		(Grenada Football Association) SRMSS
	DF	Treasher Valcin		(Grenada Football Association) HHSS
	MF	Sheranda Charles		(Grenada Football Association) MDC
	MF	Maya Hadeed		(Grenada Football Association) WSS
	MF	Kristal Julien		(Grenada Football Association) SMSS
	MF	Malia Ramdhanny		(Grenada Football Association) WSS
	MF	Cardisha Rennie		(Grenada Football Association) SAASS
	MF	Coie Smith		(Grenada Football Association) AHS
	MF	Eeron McSween		(United States Soccer Federation) Science Skills High School Center, New York
	FW	Britney Charles		(Grenada Football Association) SJCSA
	FW	Amber Dominique		(Grenada Football Association) BSS
	FW	Melania Fullerton		(United States Soccer Federation) Beasley Elementary
	FW	Aaliyah Jackson		(Grenada Football Association) SJCSA
	FW	Shaniah Johnson		(Grenada Football Association) AHS

== Guatemala ==
No.	Pos.	Player	Date of birth (age)	Club
	GK	Mariana Rodríguez		(National Football Federation of Guatemala) Pares
	GK	Natalie Schaps		(National Football Federation of Guatemala) Pares
	DF	Mónica Alvarado		(National Football Federation of Guatemala) Amatitlan
	DF	Pamela Armas		(National Football Federation of Guatemala) Quiche
	DF	Sara Fetzer		(National Football Federation of Guatemala) Xelaju
	DF	Gerta García		(National Football Federation of Guatemala) Dep. Coban
	DF	Didra Martínez	25 November 1999 (aged 16)	(National Football Federation of Guatemala) Xelaju
	DF	Yuvitza Mayén	26 July 1999 (aged 16)	(National Football Federation of Guatemala) Unifut
	DF	Sofía Portabella		(National Football Federation of Guatemala) Pares
	DF	Darlin Samayoa		(National Football Federation of Guatemala) Dep. Santa Rosa
	MF	Briana Carrera		(National Football Federation of Guatemala) Dep. Guastatoya
	MF	Thelma Gamarro		(National Football Federation of Guatemala) Semillas
	MF	Adriana Ordóñez		(National Football Federation of Guatemala) Pares
	MF	María Recinos		(National Football Federation of Guatemala) Pares
	MF	Anika Schaps		(National Football Federation of Guatemala) Pares
	FW	Madelyn Cosajay		(National Football Federation of Guatemala) Fundacion C.A.
	FW	María Herrarte		(National Football Federation of Guatemala) Pares
	FW	Karla Moulds		(National Football Federation of Guatemala) Rio Dulce
	FW	Niurka Oliva		(National Football Federation of Guatemala) Pares
	FW	Gloria Roldán		(National Football Federation of Guatemala) Amatitlan

== Haiti ==
No.	Pos.	Player	Date of birth (age)	Club
	GK	Daphney Auguste		(Haitian Football Federation) AS Tigresses
	GK	Kerly Théus	7 January 1999 (aged 17)	(Haitian Football Federation) Aigle Brillant
	DF	Émeline Charles	27 October 1999 (aged 16)	(Haitian Football Federation) Aigle Brillant
	DF	Nandie Deshommes		(Haitian Football Federation) Aigle Brillant
	DF	Rosianne Jean		(Haitian Football Federation) AS Tigresses
	DF	Saraphina Joseph		(Haitian Football Federation) AS Tigresses
	DF	Martine Olivier		(Haitian Football Federation) Aigle Brillant
	DF	Yverline Sevilne		(Haitian Football Federation) Anacaona
	MF	Émilie Ducasse		(Haitian Football Federation) AS Tigresses
	MF	Melchie Dumonay	17 August 2003 (aged 12)	(Haitian Football Federation) Camp Nous
	MF	Taina Gervais		(Haitian Football Federation) AS Tigresses
	MF	Magdala Macean		(Haitian Football Federation) Anacaona
	MF	Wagnelda Millien		(Haitian Football Federation) Valentina
	MF	Naphtalie Northe		(Haitian Football Federation) Aigle Brillant
	MF	Dolores Jean Thomas		(Haitian Football Federation) AS Tigresses
	FW	Melissa Dacius	24 May 1999 (aged 16)	(Haitian Football Federation) AS Tigresses
	FW	Roseline Éloissaint	20 February 1999 (aged 17)	(Haitian Football Federation) AS Tigresses
	FW	Mikerline Saint-Félix	18 November 1999 (aged 16)	(Haitian Football Federation) Valentina
	FW	Nérilia Mondésir	17 January 1999 (aged 17)	(Haitian Football Federation) AS Tigresses
	FW	Lovelie Pierre		(Haitian Football Federation) Anacaona

== Jamaica ==
No.	Pos.	Player	Date of birth (age)	Club
	GK	Ella Dennis		(Canadian Soccer Association) F. C. Durham
	GK	Sydney Schneider	31 August 1999 (aged 16)	(United States Soccer Federation) Match Fit Academy
	DF	Peta-Gay Dixon		(Jamaica Football Federation) Trelawny Women's
	DF	Madiya Harriott	16 February 1999 (aged 17)	(United States Soccer Federation) Sunrise S.C.
	DF	Kendaya Chin-Jackson	2 January 1999 (aged 17)	(United States Soccer Federation) Lauderhill Lions
	DF	Erin Mikalsen	21 June 1999 (aged 16)	(United States Soccer Federation) Florida Kraze Krush
	DF	Shanhaine Nelson		(Jamaica Football Federation) Waterhouse F. C.
	DF	Lyana Steele		(United States Soccer Federation) Weston F. C.
	DF	Maya Swaby-Wallerson		(Canadian Soccer Association) Stony Creek Bat.
	DF	Rachel Walters		(Jamaica Football Federation) Waterhouse F. C.
	MF	Emily Caza		(Canadian Soccer Association) GS United
	MF	Ebony Clarke		(Canadian Soccer Association) Surrey United
	MF	Tarania Clarke	3 October 1999 (aged 16)	(Jamaica Football Federation) Waterhouse F. C.
	MF	Sherice Clarke	8 March 2000 (aged 15)	(Jamaica Football Federation) Wolmers
	MF	Alyssa Julien		(United States Soccer Federation) Woodbridge S.C.
	MF	Giselle Washington	3 April 2001 (aged 14)	(United States Soccer Federation) Concord Fire
	FW	Jody Brown	16 April 2002 (aged 13)	(Jamaica Football Federation) Ocho Rios High
	FW	Marlee Fray		(United States Soccer Federation) Sunrise Sting
	FW	Dominique Moxie	19 April 1999 (aged 16)	(United States Soccer Federation) GSA ECNL
	FW	Shayla Smart	30 May 2000 (aged 15)	(United States Soccer Federation) Florida Kraze Krush

== Mexico ==
No.	Pos.	Player	Date of birth (age)	Club
	GK	Miriam Aguirre		(Mexican Football Federation) Macrosoccer
	GK	Kelsey Brann		(United States Soccer Federation) Texas Rush
	DF	Alma Lopez		(Mexican Football Federation) Estudiantes F.C
	DF	Jimena Lopez		(United States Soccer Federation) Saint Stephen's
	DF	Alessandra Ramírez		(United States Soccer Federation) Beach fc
	DF	Reyna Reyes		(United States Soccer Federation) FC Dallas
	DF	Kimberly Rodríguez		(United States Soccer Federation) Texas Rush
	DF	Ashley Soto		(United States Soccer Federation) La Salle Blues UCNL
	DF	Akemi Yokoyama		(Mexican Football Federation) U.A.N.L
	MF	Veronica Avalos		(United States Soccer Federation) San Diego Surf
	MF	Dayana Cazares		(Mexican Football Federation) Scratch Do Oro
	MF	Alexia Delgado		(Mexican Football Federation) Colegio Subire
	MF	Luisa Delgado		(United States Soccer Federation) Real So Cal
	MF	Vanessa González		(Mexican Football Federation) Centro de Formacion Monterrey
	MF	Alexandra Martinez		(Mexican Football Federation) Selección Chiapas
	MF	Lizbeth Ovalle		(Mexican Football Federation) Selección Aguascalientes
	MF	Maricarmen Reyes		(United States Soccer Federation) West Coast FC
	FW	Daniela Espinosa		(Mexican Football Federation) Selección B.C.S
	FW	Montserrat Hernández		(Mexican Football Federation) Centro de Formacion GDL
	FW	Gabriela Juárez		(United States Soccer Federation) Slammers FC

== United States ==
No.	Pos.	Player	Date of birth (age)	Club
12	GK	Hillary Beall		(United States Soccer Federation) Southern California Blues
1	GK	Laurel Ivory		(United States Soccer Federation) Sunrise Sting
4	DF	Naomi Girma		(United States Soccer Federation) Central Valley Crossfire
9	DF	Kiara Pickett		(United States Soccer Federation) Eagles SC
11	DF	Isabel Rodriguez		(United States Soccer Federation) Michigan Hawks
16	DF	Karina Rodriguez		(United States Soccer Federation) Southern California Blues
6	DF	Emily Smith		(United States Soccer Federation) De Anza Force
15	DF	Kennedy Wesley		(United States Soccer Federation) Southern California Blues
19	DF	Kate Wiesner		(United States Soccer Federation) Slammers FC
5	DF	Sydney Zardi		(United States Soccer Federation) Penn Fusion
17	MF	Jordan Canniff		(United States Soccer Federation) Richmond United
18	MF	Jaelin Howell		(United States Soccer Federation) Real Colorado
8	MF	Brianna Pinto		(United States Soccer Federation) CASL
10	MF	Ashley Sanchez		(United States Soccer Federation) Southern California Blues
2	MF	Taryn Torres		(United States Soccer Federation) FC Dallas
13	FW	Rachel Jones		(United States Soccer Federation) Tophat
14	FW	Civana Kuhlmann		(United States Soccer Federation) Colorado Rush
3	FW	Sophia Smith		(United States Soccer Federation) Real Colorado
7	FW	Alexa Spaanstra		(United States Soccer Federation) Michigan Hawks
20	FW	Frankie Tagliaferri		(United States Soccer Federation) PDA
