= 2016 CONCACAF Women's U-17 Championship qualification =

The 2016 CONCACAF Women's U-17 Championship qualification was a women's under-17 football competition which decided the participating teams of the 2016 CONCACAF Women's U-17 Championship. Players born on or after 1 January 1999 were eligible to compete in the tournament.

A total of eight teams qualified to play in the final tournament, where the berths were allocated to the three regional zones as follows:

- Three teams from the North American Zone (NAFU), i.e., Canada, Mexico and the United States, who all qualified automatically
- Two teams from the Central American Zone (UNCAF)
- Three teams from the Caribbean Zone (CFU), including Grenada who qualified automatically as hosts

The top three teams of the final tournament qualified for the 2016 FIFA U-17 Women's World Cup in Jordan.

== Teams ==
A total of 27 CONCACAF member national teams entered the tournament. Among them, four teams qualified automatically for the final tournament, and 23 teams entered the regional qualifying competitions.

Zone	Teams entering	No. of teams
North American Zone (NAFU)	Canada (qualified automatically for final tournament); Mexico (qualified automatically for final tournament); United States (qualified automatically for final tournament)	3
Central American Zone (UNCAF)	Belize; Costa Rica; El Salvador; Guatemala; Honduras; Nicaragua; Panama	7
Caribbean Zone (CFU)	Grenada (qualified automatically for final tournament); Bahamas; Barbados; Bermuda; British Virgin Islands; Cayman Islands; Cuba; Curaçao; Dominica; Dominican Republic; Haiti; Jamaica; Puerto Rico; Saint Kitts and Nevis; Saint Lucia; Suriname; Trinidad and Tobago	17

Did not enter
North American Zone (NAFU)	None
Central American Zone (UNCAF)	None
Caribbean Zone (CFU)	Anguilla; Antigua and Barbuda; Aruba; Bonaire^{1}; French Guiana^{1}; Guadeloupe^{1}; Guyana; Martinique^{1}; Montserrat; Saint Martin^{1}; Sint Maarten^{1}; Saint Vincent and the Grenadines; Turks and Caicos Islands; U.S. Virgin Islands

Notes
^{1} Non-FIFA member, ineligible for World Cup.

== Central American zone ==
2016 CONCACAF Women's U-17 Championship qualification (Central American Zone)
Eliminatoria Sub-17 Femenina de UNCAF 2015

Tournament details
- Host countries: Guatemala (group A); Honduras (group B)
- Dates: 4–15 November 2015
- Teams: 7 (from 1 sub-confederation)

Tournament statistics
- Matches played: 6
- Goals scored: 44 (7.33 per match)
- Top scorer(s): (Costa Rica) Merilyn Alvarado (Costa Rica) Gloriana Villalobos (5 goals each)

In the Central American Zone, all seven UNCAF member national teams entered the qualifying competition. They were divided into one group of four teams and one group of three teams, as drawn on 28 February 2015 at the UNCAF Executive Committee meeting in Managua, Nicaragua. Group A was played between 4–8 November 2015 in Guatemala, while Group B was played between 11–15 November in Honduras (originally between 27–31 October 2015 before Panama withdrew). The two group winners qualified for the final tournament as the UNCAF representatives.

Times UTC−6.

=== Group A ===
Pos	Team	Pld	W	D	L	GF	GA	GD	Pts	Qualification
1	Guatemala (H)	2	2	0	0	5	0	+5	6	2016 CONCACAF Women's U-17 Championship
2	El Salvador	2	1	0	1	7	2	+5	3	
3	Nicaragua	2	0	0	2	1	11	−10	0	

Source: UNCAF
(H) Hosts
4 November 2015
11:00

Nicaragua	1–7	El Salvador
Flores 74'	Report	MacNally 2'; Cruz 18', 51', 84' (?); López 28'; Tobar 68'

Estadio Mateo Flores, Guatemala City

6 November 2015
11:00

Guatemala	4–0	Nicaragua
Oliva 27', 54'; Moulds 71', 90+1'	Report

Estadio Mateo Flores, Guatemala City
Referee: Karitza Guerra (Honduras)

8 November 2015
11:00

Guatemala	1–0	El Salvador
Mayén 90'	Report

Estadio Mateo Flores, Guatemala City
Referee: Marianela Araya (Costa Rica)

=== Group B ===
Pos	Team	Pld	W	D	L	GF	GA	GD	Pts	Qualification
1	Costa Rica	2	2	0	0	21	0	+21	6	2016 CONCACAF Women's U-17 Championship
2	Honduras (H)	2	1	0	1	9	6	+3	3	
3	Belize	2	0	0	2	1	24	−23	0	
4	Panama	0	0	0	0	0	0	0	0	Withdrew

Source: UNCAF
(H) Hosts
11 November 2015
16:00

Honduras	9–1	Belize
Romero 9', 75'; Ponce 12', 15'; Martínez 22'; Mejía 37', 57'; Bonilla 47', 51'	Report	Vernon 81'

Estadio Carlos Miranda, Comayagua
Referee: Cibeles Miranda (El Salvador)

13 November 2015
16:00

Costa Rica	15–0	Belize
M. Salas 1', 45+1'; Villalobos 3', 27', 36'; Del Campo 23' (pen.); Alvarado 35', 61', 72', 88'; Corrales 48', 82'; Y. Salas 57'; Marín 86'; Sanabria 88'	Report

Estadio Carlos Miranda, Comayagua

15 November 2015
18:00

Honduras	0–6	Costa Rica
	Report	M. Salas 16', 22'; Alvarado 46'; Villalobos 51', 70'; Del Campo 87'

Estadio Carlos Miranda, Comayagua
Referee: Tatiana Guzman (Nicaragua)

=== Goalscorers ===
5 goals

- (Costa Rica) Merilyn Alvarado
- (Costa Rica) Gloriana Villalobos

4 goals

- (Costa Rica) María Paula Salas
- (El Salvador) Ashley Cruz

2 goals

- (Costa Rica) Hillary Corrales
- (Costa Rica) Valeria del Campo
- (Guatemala) Karla Moulds
- (Guatemala) Niurka Oliva
- (Honduras) Lisbeth Bonilla
- (Honduras) Katherine Mejía
- (Honduras) Sandra Ponce
- (Honduras) Fátima Romero

1 goal

- (Belize) Shandy Vernon
- (Costa Rica) Carmen Marín
- (Costa Rica) Yedry Salas
- (Costa Rica) María Sanabria
- (El Salvador) Astrid López
- (El Salvador) Kali MacNally
- (El Salvador) Ashley Tobar
- (Guatemala) Yuvitza Mayén
- (Honduras) Kiara Martínez
- (Nicaragua) Yessenia Flores

== Caribbean zone ==
2016 CONCACAF Women's U-17 Championship qualification (Caribbean Zone)
2015 CFU Women's Under-17 Qualifier

Tournament details
- Host countries: Dominican Republic (group 1); Haiti (group 2); Saint Kitts and Nevis (group 3); Suriname (group 4); Puerto Rico (final round)
- Dates: 15 July – 22 November 2015
- Teams: 16 (from 1 sub-confederation)

Final positions
- Champions: Jamaica
- Runners-up: Haiti
- Third place: Trinidad and Tobago
- Fourth place: Cuba

Tournament statistics
- Matches played: 37
- Goals scored: 164 (4.43 per match)
- Top scorer: (Haiti) Nérilia Mondésir (14 goals)

In the Caribbean Zone, 16 CFU member national teams entered the qualifying competition (Dominica was not included in the original draw, but was later added). Among them, 15 teams entered the first round, where they were divided into three groups of four teams and one group of three teams. The groups were played between 15–19 July and 22–26 August 2015 and hosted by one of the teams in each group. The four group winners, the two best runners-up of the four-team groups, and the runner-up of the three-team group advanced to the final round to be joined by final round hosts Puerto Rico.

In the final round, played between 13–22 November 2015 in Puerto Rico, the eight teams were divided into two groups of four teams, where the top two teams of each group advanced to play a single-elimination tournament. The top two teams qualified for the final tournament as the CFU representatives besides hosts Grenada.

Times UTC−4; UTC−3 for Group 4.

=== First round ===
==== Group 1 ====
Matches played in Dominican Republic.

Pos	Team	Pld	W	D	L	GF	GA	GD	Pts	Qualification
1	Cuba	3	3	0	0	13	1	+12	9	Final round
2	Dominican Republic (H)	3	2	0	1	5	4	+1	6	Final round
3	Cayman Islands	3	1	0	2	4	9	−5	3	
4	Bahamas	3	0	0	3	1	9	−8	0	

Source: CFU
(H) Hosts
15 July 2015
14:00

Cayman Islands	0–6	Cuba
	Report	Sablon (?); Mengana (?); Pérez (?); Aguilar (?)

Estadio Panamericano, San Cristóbal
15 July 2015
16:30

Dominican Republic	2–0	Bahamas
Balbuena 44', 90+2'	Report

Estadio Panamericano, San Cristóbal

17 July 2015
14:00

Cuba	5–1	Bahamas
Pérez 10', 50'; Cabrera 35'; Espinosa 55'; Sablon 63'	Report	Simms 18'

Estadio Panamericano, San Cristóbal
17 July 2015
16:30

Dominican Republic	3–2	Cayman Islands
Taveras 37'; Balbuena 43'; López 47' (pen.)	Report	Green 89'; Suberan 90+2'

Estadio Panamericano, San Cristóbal

19 July 2015
14:00

Bahamas	0–2	Cayman Islands
	Report	Green (?); Suberan (?)

Estadio Panamericano, San Cristóbal
19 July 2015
16:30

Dominican Republic	0–2	Cuba
	Report	Sablon 10'; Ramos 60'

Estadio Panamericano, San Cristóbal

==== Group 2 ====
Matches played in Haiti.

Pos	Team	Pld	W	D	L	GF	GA	GD	Pts	Qualification
1	Haiti (H)	2	2	0	0	11	1	+10	6	Final round
2	Bermuda	2	1	0	1	6	5	+1	3	Final round
3	Curaçao	2	0	0	2	2	13	−11	0	

Source: CFU
(H) Hosts
15 July 2015
18:00

Curaçao	1–6	Bermuda
Hart 16'	Report	Lowe-Darrell 14'; Nesbeth 27', 47', 59'; Durham 45'; Lindo 55'

Stade Sylvio Cator, Port-au-Prince

17 July 2015
18:00

Haiti	7–1	Curaçao
Mondésir 33', 58', 67'; Dacius 56'; Dumornay 61'; Jean-Thomas 77', 80'	Report	Martina 4'

Stade Sylvio Cator, Port-au-Prince

19 July 2015
18:00

Haiti	4–0	Bermuda
Mondésir (?)	Report

Stade Sylvio Cator, Port-au-Prince

==== Group 3 ====
Matches played in Saint Kitts and Nevis. In the original draw, the group included only three teams, but Dominica was later added to this group.

Pos	Team	Pld	W	D	L	GF	GA	GD	Pts	Qualification
1	Trinidad and Tobago	3	3	0	0	16	0	+16	9	Final round
2	Saint Kitts and Nevis (H)	3	2	0	1	4	5	−1	6	
3	Dominica	3	1	0	2	2	6	−4	3	
4	British Virgin Islands	3	0	0	3	2	13	−11	0	

Source: CFU
(H) Hosts
22 August 2015
17:30

Trinidad and Tobago	4–0	Dominica
Jack 66'; Campbell 68'; Honore 72'; Ward 88'

Warner Park Sporting Complex, Basseterre
22 August 2015
20:00

Saint Kitts and Nevis	3–1	British Virgin Islands
Pemberton 19', 36'; Browne 46'		K. Lowery 85' (pen.)

Warner Park Sporting Complex, Basseterre

25 August 2015
09:30

British Virgin Islands	0–8	Trinidad and Tobago
		Jack 19', 67'; Honore 29', 47', 65'; Ward 44'; Theodore 88'; Henry 90+1'

Warner Park Sporting Complex, Basseterre
25 August 2015
15:30

Saint Kitts and Nevis	1–0	Dominica
Phillip 68'

Warner Park Sporting Complex, Basseterre

26 August 2015
17:30

British Virgin Islands	1–2	Dominica
E. Lowery (?)		? (?) ? (?)

Warner Park Sporting Complex, Basseterre
26 August 2015
20:00

Saint Kitts and Nevis	0–4	Trinidad and Tobago
		Honore 25', 90'; Henry 36'; Theodore 73'

Warner Park Sporting Complex, Basseterre

The second round of matches, originally scheduled for 24 August (17:30 and 20:00), were delayed to 25 August due to a tropical storm.

==== Group 4 ====
Matches played in Suriname.

Pos	Team	Pld	W	D	L	GF	GA	GD	Pts	Qualification
1	Jamaica	3	3	0	0	17	1	+16	9	Final round
2	Barbados	3	2	0	1	6	3	+3	6	Final round
3	Suriname (H)	3	1	0	2	6	3	+3	3	
4	Saint Lucia	3	0	0	3	0	22	−22	0	

Source: CFU
(H) Hosts
15 July 2015
15:30

Barbados	1–2	Jamaica
Clarke 14'	Report	Gordon 22', 31'

Dr. Ir. Franklin Essed Stadion, Paramaribo
15 July 2015
18:00

Suriname	5–0	Saint Lucia
Dompig (?); Renfrum (?); Tjoen A Choy (?)	Report

Dr. Ir. Franklin Essed Stadion, Paramaribo

17 July 2015
15:30

Jamaica	14–0	Saint Lucia
Brown 5', 3', 38', 54'; S. Clarke 8', 34'; T. Clarke 16', 27', 29'; Nelson 19', 21', 90+3'; Pitter 63'; Perrier 65'	Report

Dr. Ir. Franklin Essed Stadion, Paramaribo
17 July 2015
18:00

Suriname	1–2	Barbados
Righters (?)	Report	Jarvis (?); Carrington (?)

Dr. Ir. Franklin Essed Stadion, Paramaribo

19 July 2015
15:30

Saint Lucia	0–3	Barbados
	Report	Clarke (?); Jarvis (?); Carrington (?)

Dr. Ir. Franklin Essed Stadion, Paramaribo
19 July 2015
18:00

Suriname	0–1	Jamaica
	Report	Perrier 62'

Dr. Ir. Franklin Essed Stadion, Paramaribo

==== Ranking of second-placed teams ====
In addition to the runner-up of Group 2 (with three teams), the two best runners-up of Groups 1, 3 and 4 (with four teams) also advance to the final round.

Pos	Grp	Team	Pld	W	D	L	GF	GA	GD	Pts	Qualification
1	4	Barbados	3	2	0	1	6	3	+3	6	Final round
2	1	Dominican Republic	3	2	0	1	5	4	+1	6	Final round
3	3	Saint Kitts and Nevis	3	2	0	1	4	5	−1	6	

Source: CFU

=== Final round ===
Matches played in Puerto Rico.

==== Group A ====
Pos	Team	Pld	W	D	L	GF	GA	GD	Pts	Qualification
1	Jamaica	3	2	1	0	9	4	+5	7	Semi-finals
2	Cuba	3	2	0	1	4	3	+1	6	Semi-finals
3	Puerto Rico (H)	3	1	1	1	5	4	+1	4	
4	Bermuda	3	0	0	3	1	8	−7	0	

Source: CFU
(H) Hosts
13 November 2015
16:30

Cuba	1–0	Bermuda
Pérez 62'

Juan Ramón Loubriel Stadium, Bayamón
13 November 2015
19:30

Puerto Rico	2–2	Jamaica
Díaz 17' (pen.), 28'		T. Clarke 12'; Fray 69'

Juan Ramón Loubriel Stadium, Bayamón

15 November 2015
16:30

Jamaica	5–1	Bermuda
Fray 6', 14'; T. Clarke 44'; Brown 59'; Gordon 67'	Report	Christopher 50'

Juan Ramón Loubriel Stadium, Bayamón
15 November 2015
19:00

Puerto Rico	1–2	Cuba
Cotto 80'	Report	Pérez 35'; Sarria 50'

Juan Ramón Loubriel Stadium, Bayamón

17 November 2015
16:30

Cuba	1–2	Jamaica
Sablon 61'		Gordon 68', 71'

Juan Ramón Loubriel Stadium, Bayamón
17 November 2015
19:30

Puerto Rico	2–0	Bermuda
Díaz 30' (pen.), 67'

Juan Ramón Loubriel Stadium, Bayamón

==== Group B ====
Pos	Team	Pld	W	D	L	GF	GA	GD	Pts	Qualification
1	Haiti	3	3	0	0	20	0	+20	9	Semi-finals
2	Trinidad and Tobago	3	2	0	1	11	6	+5	6	Semi-finals
3	Dominican Republic	3	1	0	2	5	8	−3	3	
4	Barbados	3	0	0	3	2	24	−22	0	

Source: CFU
14 November 2015
16:30

Trinidad and Tobago	4–1	Dominican Republic
Ward 34', 45'; Theordore 43'; James 61'	Report	Cambiazo 2'

Juan Ramón Loubriel Stadium, Bayamón
14 November 2015
19:00

Haiti	13–0	Barbados
Mondésir 2', 40', 43', 68'; Nicolas 32'; Dacius 42', 45'; Pierre 55', 74'; Éloissaint 85', 88'; Saint-Félix 67', 90'	Report

Juan Ramón Loubriel Stadium, Bayamón

16 November 2015
16:30

Dominican Republic	0–3	Haiti
		Nicolas 17'; Éloissaint 20'; Millien 90+3'

Juan Ramón Loubriel Stadium, Bayamón
16 November 2015
19:00

Trinidad and Tobago	7–1	Barbados
John 4'; Ellis 18', 45'; Fortune 56', 58'; Honore 67', 70'		Carrington 60'

Juan Ramón Loubriel Stadium, Bayamón

18 November 2015
16:30

Barbados	1–4	Dominican Republic
Padmore 25'		Ureña 5' (pen.); López 6', 86'; Balbuena 43' (pen.)

Juan Ramón Loubriel Stadium, Bayamón
18 November 2015
19:00

Haiti	4–0	Trinidad and Tobago
Nicolas 9', 26'; Mondésir 39'; Pierre 50'

Juan Ramón Loubriel Stadium, Bayamón

==== Semi-finals ====
Winners qualified for 2016 CONCACAF Women's U-17 Championship.

20 November 2015
16:30

Jamaica	1–0	Trinidad and Tobago
Fray 83'	Report

Juan Ramón Loubriel Stadium, Bayamón
20 November 2015
19:30

Haiti	3–2 (a.e.t.)	Cuba
Nicolas 16'; Mondésir 99'; Pierre 104'	Report	Ferrer 23'; Corcho 109'

Juan Ramón Loubriel Stadium, Bayamón

==== Third place playoff ====
22 November 2015
16:30

Trinidad and Tobago	3–0	Cuba
Theodore 25', 76'; Paul 69'	Report

Juan Ramón Loubriel Stadium, Bayamón

==== Final ====
22 November 2015
19:30

Jamaica	2–1	Haiti
Smart 3'; Brown 67'	Report	Mondésir 71'

Juan Ramón Loubriel Stadium, Bayamón

=== Goalscorers ===
14 goals

- (Haiti) Nérilia Mondésir

7 goals

- (Trinidad and Tobago) Nia Honore

6 goals

- (Cuba) Lilian Pérez
- (Jamaica) Jody Brown

5 goals

- (Cuba) Yilianny Sablon
- (Haiti) Nelourde Nicolas
- (Jamaica) Tarania Clarke
- (Jamaica) Rena Gordon
- (Trinidad and Tobago) Laurelle Theodore
- (Trinidad and Tobago) Ranae Ward

4 goals

- (Dominican Republic) Dayarí Balbuena
- (Haiti) Lovelie Pierre
- (Jamaica) Marlee Fray
- (Puerto Rico) Ángela Díaz

3 goals

- (Barbados) Shaunte Carrington
- (Bermuda) Leilanni Nesbeth
- (Dominican Republic) María López
- (Haiti) Melissa Dacius
- (Haiti) Roseline Éloissaint
- (Jamaica) Shanhaine Nelson
- (Suriname) Chayenne Dompig
- (Trinidad and Tobago) Kaydeen Jack

2 goals

- (Barbados) Nashandi Clarke
- (Barbados) Felicia Jarvis
- (Cayman Islands) Chelsea Green
- (Cayman Islands) Sabrina Suberan
- (Haiti) Dolores Jean-Thomas
- (Haiti) Mikerline Saint-Félix
- (Jamaica) Sherice Clarke
- (Jamaica) Monique Perrier
- (Saint Kitts and Nevis) Zynzelle Pemberton
- (Trinidad and Tobago) Amaya Ellis
- (Trinidad and Tobago) Alexis Fortune
- (Trinidad and Tobago) Kelsey Henry

1 goal

- (The Bahamas) Hannan Simms
- (Barbados) Caitlin Padmore
- (Bermuda) Nia Christopher
- (Bermuda) Zakiyah Durham
- (Bermuda) Teyah Lindo
- (Bermuda) Symira Lowe-Darrell
- (British Virgin Islands) Emily Lowery
- (British Virgin Islands) Katie Lowery
- (Cuba) Nahomi Aguilar
- (Cuba) Braysi Cabrera
- (Cuba) Wendy Corcho
- (Cuba) Maidevis Espinosa
- (Cuba) Sairy Ferrer
- (Cuba) Maristiania Mengana
- (Cuba) Yenifer Ramos
- (Cuba) Yilien Sarria
- (Curaçao) Lindsay Hart
- (Curaçao) Sjulienne Martina
- (Dominican Republic) Carmen Cambiazo
- (Dominican Republic) Ana Taveras
- (Dominican Republic) Minely Ureña
- (Haiti) Melchie Dumornay
- (Haiti) Wagnelada Millien
- (Jamaica) Tateyana Pitter
- (Jamaica) Shayla Smart
- (Puerto Rico) Josephine Cotto
- (Saint Kitts and Nevis) Shaniqua Browne
- (Saint Kitts and Nevis) Zhane Phillip
- (Suriname) Brandy Renfrum
- (Suriname) Nancy Righters
- (Suriname) Shania Tjoen A Choy
- (Trinidad and Tobago) Raenah Campbell
- (Trinidad and Tobago) Asha James
- (Trinidad and Tobago) Natisha John
- (Trinidad and Tobago) Shenieka Paul

Note: Two goals scored by Dominica missing goalscorer information.

== Qualified teams ==
The following eight teams qualified for the final tournament.

Team	Qualified as	Qualified on	Previous appearances in tournament^{1}
Canada	Automatic qualifier	N/A	4 (2008, **2010**, 2012, 2013)
Mexico	Automatic qualifier	N/A	4 (2008, 2010, 2012, **2013**)
United States	Automatic qualifier	N/A	4 (**2008**, 2010, **2012**, 2013)
Grenada	Hosts	15 May 2015	0 (debut)
Guatemala	Central American Zone Group A winner	8 November 2015	2 (2012, 2013)
Costa Rica	Central American Zone Group B winner	15 November 2015	2 (2008, 2010)
Jamaica	Caribbean Zone 1st place	20 November 2015	4 (2008, 2010, 2012, 2013)
Haiti	Caribbean Zone 2nd place	20 November 2015	2 (2010, 2013)

^{1} Bold indicates champion for that year. Italic indicates host for that year.
