= 2014 CONCACAF Girls' U-15 Championship =

Tournament details
- Host country: Cayman Islands
- Dates: 6–17 August
- Teams: 16 (from CONCACAF confederations)

Final positions
- Champions: Canada
- Runners-up: Haiti
- Third place: Trinidad and Tobago
- Fourth place: Honduras

Tournament statistics
- Matches played: 28
- Goals scored: 111 (3.96 per match)
- Top scorer(s): (Cayman Islands) Chelsea Green (Haiti) Nérilia Mondésir (6 goals)
- Best player: (Canada) Sarah Stratigakis
- Best goalkeeper: (Canada) Lysianne Proulx
- Fair play award: Honduras

The 2014 CONCACAF Girls' U-15 Championship was an association football tournament that took place in the Cayman Islands during August 2014. Each match lasted 70 minutes.

== Participants ==
- Anguilla
- Bahamas
- Barbados
- Bermuda
- Belize
- British Virgin Islands
- Canada
- Cayman Islands
- Costa Rica
- Cuba
- Curaçao
- Haiti
- Honduras
- Jamaica
- Puerto Rico
- Trinidad and Tobago

== Venues ==
Ed Bush Sports Complex	Truman Bodden Sports Complex	Cayman Brac Sports Field	T.E. McField Sports Centre
West Bay	George Town	Cayman Brac	George Town
19.381074°N 81.398828°W	19.278452°N 81.382902°W	19.728590°N 79.811085°W	19.298689°N 81.376920°W

Location of venues

== Group stage ==
=== Tiebreakers ===
The following tiebreaking criteria were established by CONCACAF:

1. Greatest number of points obtained in all group matches
2. Goal difference in all group matches
3. Greatest number of goals scored in all group matches
4. Greatest number of points obtained in matches amongst teams still tied
5. Lots drawn by the Organizing Committee

=== Group A ===
Pos	Team	Pld	W	D	L	GF	GA	GD	Pts	Qualification
1	Cayman Islands (H)	3	3	0	0	15	1	+14	9	Knockout stage
2	Bahamas	3	1	1	1	4	4	0	4	Knockout stage
3	Curaçao	3	1	0	2	2	10	−8	3	
4	British Virgin Islands	3	0	1	2	1	7	−6	1	

Source: CONCACAF
Rules for classification: Tiebreakers
(H) Hosts
6 August 2014
17:30

Bahamas	3–0	Curaçao
Meaghan Smith 13'; Jaleah Taylor 61'; Marisa Vietti 69'	Report

Ed Bush Sports Complex
6 August 2014
19:30

Cayman Islands	5–0	British Virgin Islands
Chelsea Green 15', 25', 30'; Sabrina Suberan 23'; Deondra Kelly 75'	Report

Truman Bodden Sports Complex
Attendance: 1,100
8 August 2014
19:30

Cayman Islands	4–1	Bahamas
Chelsea Green 2'; Lauren Scott 5', 42'; Sabrina Suberan 17'	Report	Laurann Brown 70'

Truman Bodden Sports Complex
8 August 2014
19:30

British Virgin Islands	1–2	Curaçao
Katie Lowery 41'	Report	Lindsey Hart 46', 50'

Ed Bush Sports Complex
10 August 2014
17:30

Bahamas	0–0	British Virgin Islands
	Report

Ed Bush Sports Complex
10 August 2014
19:30

Cayman Islands	6–0	Curaçao
Halle Medina 3'; Jasmine Powery 20'; Chelsea Green 21', 23'; Jerusha Martina 30' (o.g.); Eugenie Steba 58' (o.g.)	Report

Truman Bodden Sports Complex

=== Group B ===
Pos	Team	Pld	W	D	L	GF	GA	GD	Pts	Qualification
1	Trinidad and Tobago	3	2	1	0	7	1	+6	7	Knockout stage
2	Honduras	3	2	0	1	4	2	+2	6	Knockout stage
3	Bermuda	3	1	1	1	8	3	+5	4	
4	Barbados	3	0	0	3	1	14	−13	0	

Source: CONCACAF
Rules for classification: Tiebreakers
6 August 2014
17:30

Honduras	1–0	Bermuda
Andrea López 21'	Report

Truman Bodden Sports Complex
6 August 2014
19:30

Trinidad and Tobago	4–0	Barbados
Paul 16'; Nia Honore 28'; Laurel Theodore 51', 54'	Report

Ed Bush Sports Complex
8 August 2014
17:30

Barbados	0–3	Honduras
	Report	Annelise Canahuati 25'; Sharon Moreira 60'; Lisbeth Cruz 68'

Truman Bodden Sports Complex
8 August 2014
17:30

Bermuda	1–1	Trinidad and Tobago
Nia Christopher 36'	Report	Raenah Campbell 11'

Ed Bush Sports Complex
10 August 2014
17:30

Honduras	0–2	Trinidad and Tobago
	Report	Alexis Fortune 14'; Amaya Ellis 43'

Truman Bodden Sports Complex
10 August 2014
19:30

Bermuda	7–1	Barbados
Leilanni Nesbeth 6', 17', 50'; Teyah Lindo 34', 35'; Tae-eja Bean 67'; Symira Darrell 69'	Report	Felicia Jarvis 21'

Ed Bush Sports Complex

=== Group C ===
Pos	Team	Pld	W	D	L	GF	GA	GD	Pts	Qualification
1	Jamaica	3	2	1	0	14	0	+14	7	Knockout stage
2	Costa Rica	3	2	1	0	12	0	+12	7	Knockout stage
3	Belize	3	0	1	2	1	13	−12	1	
4	Anguilla	3	0	1	2	1	15	−14	1	

Source: CONCACAF
Rules for classification: Tiebreakers
7 August 2014
17:30

Costa Rica	5–0	Anguilla
Merelyn Morera 8', 20', 32'; Carmen Rapaport 9', 50'	Report

T.E. McField Sports Centre
7 August 2014
19:30

Jamaica	5–0	Belize
Chavelle Henry 15'; Monique Perrier 29'; Shanhaine Nelson 40'; Sherice Clarke 45'; T. Clarke 47'	Report

T.E. McField Sports Centre
9 August 2014
17:30

Belize	0–7	Costa Rica
	Report	Irela Rodríguez 19', 37', 39'; Meredith Calderón 21'; Merelyn Alvarado 26', 67'; Fernanda Sanabria 77'

T.E. McField Sports Centre
9 August 2014
19:30

Anguilla	0–9	Jamaica
	Report	Chavelle Henry 11'; Brown 12', 17', 19', 30'; Gabrielle Gayle 27'; Shanhaine Nelson 42'; Jamila Ashley 61'; Sydoney Clarke 70'

T.E. McField Sports Centre
11 August 2014
17:30

Anguilla	1–1	Belize
Lanecia Romney 31'	Report	Valiente Lambert 7'

T.E. McField Sports Centre
11 August 2014
19:30

Jamaica	0–0	Costa Rica
	Report

T.E. McField Sports Centre
Attendance: 1,800

=== Group D ===
Pos	Team	Pld	W	D	L	GF	GA	GD	Pts	Qualification
1	Canada	3	2	1	0	12	1	+11	7	Knockout stage
2	Haiti	3	2	1	0	5	2	+3	7	Knockout stage
3	Puerto Rico	3	0	1	2	1	7	−6	1	
4	Cuba	3	0	1	2	2	10	−8	1	

Source: CONCACAF
Rules for classification: Tiebreakers
7 August 2014
17:30

Haiti	3–1	Cuba
Mondésir 34'; Lovelie Pierre 43'; Nicolas 44'	Report	Nandie Deshommes 28' (o.g.)

Cayman Brac Sports Field
7 August 2014
19:30

Canada	5–0	Puerto Rico
Nahida Baalbaki 13'; Lauren Raimondo 21'; Stratigakis 26', 35'; Mya Jones 57'	Report

Cayman Brac Sports Field
9 August 2014
17:30

Puerto Rico	0–1	Haiti
	Report	Nicolas 72'

Cayman Brac Sports Field
9 August 2014
19:30

Cuba	0–6	Canada
	Report	Anyssa Ibrahim 9'; Teni Akindoju 24'; Stratigakis 25'; Camila Gomez 38', 53'; Nahida Baalbaki 44'

Cayman Brac Sports Field
11 August 2014
17:30

Cuba	1–1	Puerto Rico
Nahomi Aguilar 57'	Report	Yomaries Santiago 6'

Cayman Brac Sports Field
11 August 2014
19:30

Canada	1–1	Haiti
Lauren Raimondo 14'	Report	Mondésir 15'

Cayman Brac Sports Field

== Knockout stage ==
In the knockout stages, if a match is level at the end of normal playing time, shall be played by penalty shoot-out to determine the winner.

Quarter-finals
13 August — George Town
Cayman Islands	2
Honduras	3
13 August — George Town
Jamaica	1
Haiti	2
13 August — George Town
Trinidad and Tobago	4
Bahamas	0
13 August — George Town
Canada	8
Costa Rica	1

Semi-finals
15 August — George Town
Honduras	0
Haiti	2
15 August — George Town
Trinidad and Tobago	0
Canada	1

Final
17 August — George Town
Haiti	1 (1)
Canada (p)	1 (4)
Third place
17 August — George Town
Trinidad and Tobago	5
Honduras	2

=== Quarter-finals ===
13 August 2014
17:30

Trinidad and Tobago	4–0	Bahamas
Alexis Fortune 17'; Adanyo Phillip 50', 51'; Raenah Campbell 52'	Report

Truman Bodden Sports Complex
13 August 2014
19:30

Cayman Islands	2–3	Honduras
Lauren Scott 17'; Tyra McField 64'	Report	Lisbeth Bonilla 29', 47'; Sharon Moreira 66'

Truman Bodden Sports Complex
13 August 2014
17:30

Canada	8–1	Costa Rica
Anyssa Ibrahim 3', 29', 56'; Stratigakis 11', 65'; Lauren Raimondo 57'; Shana Flynn 69'; Teni Akindoju 72'	Report	Meredith Bustos 8'

T.E. McField Sports Centre
13 August 2014
19:30

Jamaica	1–2	Haiti
Brown 29'	Report	Lovelie Pierre 50'; Mondésir 52'

T.E. McField Sports Centre

=== Semi-finals ===
15 August 2014
17:30

Trinidad and Tobago	0–1	Canada
	Report	Anyssa Ibrahim 16'

Truman Bodden Sports Complex
15 August 2014
19:30

Honduras	0–2	Haiti
	Report	Mondésir 4', 70'

Truman Bodden Sports Complex

=== Third place playoff ===
17 August 2014
17:30

Trinidad and Tobago	5–2	Honduras
Raenah Campbell 4', 48'; Laurelle Thoedore 16', 20', 33'	Report	Lisbeth Bonilla 70', 77'

Truman Bodden Sports Complex

=== Final ===
17 August 2014
19:30

Haiti	1–1	Canada
Mondésir 47'	Report	Lauren Raimondo 74'
Penalties
Mondésir (penalty missed); Dacius (penalty scored); Saraphina Joseph (penalty missed)	1–4	(penalty scored) Shana Flynn; (penalty scored) Samantha Chang; (penalty scored) Stratigakis; (penalty scored) Huitema

Truman Bodden Sports Complex

== Goalscorers ==
6 goals

- (Cayman Islands) Chelsea Green
- (Haiti) Nérilia Mondésir

5 goals

- (Canada) Anyssa Ibrahim
- (Canada) Sarah Stratigakis
- (Jamaica) Jody Brown
- (Costa Rica) Merelyn Ashley Alvarado

4 goals

- (Canada) Lauren Raimondo
- (Honduras) Lisbeth Bonilla

== Player awards ==
Best XI

The Best XI was:

- Goalkeeper: (Canada) Lysianne Proulx
- Defence: (Canada) Emma Regan, (Canada) Samantha Chang, (Trinidad and Tobago) Amaya Ellis, (Canada) Kennedy Faulknor
- Midfield: (Cayman Islands) Chelsea Green, (Canada) Sarah Stratigakis, (Canada) Nahida Baalbaki, (Trinidad and Tobago) Raenah Campbell
- Attack: (Canada) Anyssa Ibrahim, (Haiti) Nérilia Mondésir

Best XI

The Technical Study Group named its award winners following the final:

Player of the Tournament (Golden Ball)

- (Canada) Sarah Stratigakis

Golden Boot

- (Cayman Islands) Chelsea Green & (Haiti) Nérilia Mondésir

Golden Glove

- (Canada) Lysianne Proulx

Fair Play Award

- Honduras
