= 2016 CONCACAF Women's U-17 Championship =

Tournament details
- Host country: Grenada
- City: St. George's
- Dates: 3–13 March
- Teams: 8 (from 1 confederation)
- Venues: 2 (in 1 host city)

Final positions
- Champions: United States (3rd title)
- Runners-up: Mexico
- Third place: Canada
- Fourth place: Haiti

Tournament statistics
- Matches played: 16
- Goals scored: 79 (4.94 per match)
- Top scorer(s): (Haiti) Nérilia Mondésir (7 goals)
- Best player: (United States) Ashley Sanchez
- Best goalkeeper: (United States) Laurel Ivory
- Fair play award: Mexico

The 2016 CONCACAF Women's U-17 Championship was the 5th edition of the CONCACAF Women's U-17 Championship, the biennial international youth football championship organised by CONCACAF for the women's under-17 national teams of the North, Central American and Caribbean region. The tournament was hosted by Grenada and take place between 3–13 March 2016, as announced by CONCACAF on 15 May 2015. A total of eight teams will play in the tournament.

Same as previous editions, the tournament acted as the CONCACAF qualifiers for the FIFA U-17 Women's World Cup. The top three teams of the tournament qualified for the 2016 FIFA U-17 Women's World Cup in Jordan as the CONCACAF representatives.

The United States won their third title overall with a 2–1 final victory over Mexico. Both finalists and third-placed Canada qualified for the World Cup.

== Qualification ==
The eight berths were allocated to the three regional zones as follows:

- Three teams from the North American Zone (NAFU), i.e., Canada, Mexico and the United States, who all qualified automatically
- Two teams from the Central American Zone (UNCAF)
- Three teams from the Caribbean Zone (CFU), including Grenada who qualified automatically as hosts

Regional qualification tournaments were held to determine the four teams joining Canada, Mexico, the United States, and hosts Grenada at the final tournament.

=== Qualified teams ===
The following eight teams qualified for the final tournament.

Team	Qualification	Appearance	Previous best performances	Previous FIFA U-17 Women's World Cup appearances
North American Zone (NAFU)
Canada	Automatic	5th	Winner (2010)	4
Mexico	Automatic	5th	Winner (2013)	3
United States	Automatic	5th	Winner (2008, 2012)	2
Central American Zone (UNCAF) qualified through Central American qualifying competition
Guatemala	Group A winner	3rd	Group stage (2012, 2013)	0
Costa Rica	Group B winner	3rd	Runner-up (2008)	2
Caribbean Zone (CFU) qualified through Caribbean qualifying competition
Grenada	Hosts	1st	Debut	0
Jamaica	Final round winner	5th	Fourth place (2013)	0
Haiti	Final round runner-up	3rd	Group stage (2010, 2013)	0

== Venues ==
The tournament was hosted in St. George's. The Grenada Athletic Stadium hosted the matches for Group A, as well as the semifinals, third place match and the final, while the Grenada National Stadium hosted the matches for Group B.

== Draw ==
The draw for the tournament took place on 21 January 2016 at 11:00 AST (UTC−4) at the Radisson Grenada Beach Resort Hotel in St. George's.

The eight teams were drawn into two groups of four teams. Tournament host Grenada were seeded in Group A, while defending CONCACAF Women's U-17 Championship champion Mexico were seeded in Group B.

Pot 1	Pot 2	Pot 3
Grenada (Position A1); Haiti; Jamaica	Costa Rica; Guatemala	Canada; Mexico (Position B1); United States

== Squads ==
Players born on or after 1 January 1999 were eligible to compete in the tournament. Each team could register a maximum of 20 players (two of whom must be goalkeepers).

== Group stage ==
The top two teams of each group advanced to the semi-finals. The teams were ranked according to points (3 points for a win, 1 point for a draw, 0 points for a loss). If tied on points, tiebreakers would be applied in the following order:

1. Goal difference in all group matches;
2. Greatest number of goals scored in all group matches;
3. Greatest number of points obtained in the group matches between the teams concerned;
4. Goal difference resulting from the group matches between the teams concerned;
5. Greater number of goals scored in all group matches between the teams concerned;
6. Drawing of lots.

All times were local, AST (UTC−4).

=== Group A ===
Pos	Team	Pld	W	D	L	GF	GA	GD	Pts	Qualification
1	Haiti	3	3	0	0	18	3	+15	9	Knockout stage
2	Canada	3	2	0	1	11	2	+9	6	Knockout stage
3	Guatemala	3	1	0	2	9	6	+3	3	
4	Grenada (H)	3	0	0	3	0	27	−27	0	

Source: CONCACAF
(H) Hosts
3 March 2016
17:00

Guatemala	0–3	Canada
	Report	Riviere 6'; Stratigakis 34'; Kats 64'

Grenada Athletic Stadium, St. George's
Referee: Francia González (Mexico)
3 March 2016
19:30

Grenada	0–13	Haiti
	Report	Saint-Félix 4', 14'; Mondésir 8', 37', 40', 41'; Dumonay 13'; Olivier 27'; Dacius 33', 54'; Éloissaint 52'; Pierre 70', 83'

Grenada Athletic Stadium, St. George's
Referee: Lola Simmons (Anguilla)

5 March 2016
13:00

Haiti	3–2	Guatemala
Saint-Félix 6', 11'; Mondésir 88'	Report	Herrarte 53'; Mayén 73'

Grenada Athletic Stadium, St. George's
Referee: Yanely Chavez (Cuba)
5 March 2016
15:30

Canada	7–0	Grenada
Baalbaki 3'; Akindoju 11', 12', 26'; Huitema 71', 88'; Faulknor 85'	Report

Grenada Athletic Stadium, St. George's
Referee: Karen Abt (United States)

7 March 2016
17:00

Canada	1–2	Haiti
Stratigakis 78'	Report	Saint-Félix 81'; Dacius 84' (pen.)

Grenada Athletic Stadium, St. George's
Referee: Karitza Guerra (Honduras)
7 March 2016
19:30

Grenada	0–7	Guatemala
	Report	Ordóñez 13'; Oliva 34', 60'; Mayén 45+2'; Herrarte 49'; Charles 72' (o.g.); Martínez 87'

Grenada Athletic Stadium, St. George's
Referee: Crystal Sobers (Trinidad and Tobago)

=== Group B ===
Pos	Team	Pld	W	D	L	GF	GA	GD	Pts	Qualification
1	United States	3	3	0	0	11	1	+10	9	Knockout stage
2	Mexico	3	2	0	1	5	3	+2	6	Knockout stage
3	Costa Rica	3	1	0	2	5	8	−3	3	
4	Jamaica	3	0	0	3	3	12	−9	0	

Source: CONCACAF
4 March 2016
13:00

Mexico	4–2	Costa Rica
Hernández 2'; Cazares 18'; Espinosa 80', 87'	Report	G. Villalobos 23', 61'

Grenada National Stadium, St. George's
Referee: Joanne Monestime (Haiti)
4 March 2016
15:30

Jamaica	1–8	United States
Smart 32'	Report	Kuhlmann 15', 49'; Sanchez 34', 56'; Tagliaferri 72', 75', 81', 87'

Grenada National Stadium, St. George's
Referee: Tatiana Montes (Panama)

6 March 2016
13:00

Costa Rica	3–2	Jamaica
Del Campo 29' (pen.); Alvarado 76'; Salas 90+1'	Report	E. Clarke 22'; T. Clarke 34'

Grenada National Stadium, St. George's
Referee: Sandra Benítez (El Salvador)
6 March 2016
15:30

United States	1–0	Mexico
Sanchez 73'	Report

Grenada National Stadium, St. George's
Referee: Marie-Soleil Beaudoin (Canada)

8 March 2016
13:00

United States	2–0	Costa Rica
Spaanstra 7'; Sanchez 38' (pen.)	Report

Grenada National Stadium, St. George's
Referee: Tatiana Montes (Panama)
8 March 2016
15:30

Mexico	1–0	Jamaica
Ovalle 42'	Report

Grenada National Stadium, St. George's
Referee: Lola Simmons (Anguilla)

== Knockout stage ==
In the knockout stage, penalty shoot-out would be used to decide the winner if necessary (no extra time would be played).

=== Bracket ===
Semi-finals
11 March – St. George's
Haiti	0
Mexico	3
11 March – St. George's
United States	5
Canada	0

Final
13 March – St. George's
Mexico	1
United States	2
Third place
13 March – St. George's
Haiti	2
Canada	4

=== Semi-finals ===
Winners qualified for 2016 FIFA U-17 Women's World Cup.

11 March 2016
17:00

Haiti	0–3	Mexico
	Report	Cazares 5'; Reyes 13'; Hernández 75'

Grenada Athletic Stadium, St. George's
Referee: Crystal Sobers (Trinidad and Tobago)

11 March 2016
20:00

United States	5–0	Canada
Spaanstra 33'; Canniff 45+1'; Kuhlmann 54'; Smith 90+1'; Tagliaferri 90+3'	Report

Grenada Athletic Stadium, St. George's
Referee: Tatiana Montes (Panama)

=== Third place playoff ===
Winner qualified for 2016 FIFA U-17 Women's World Cup.

13 March 2016
15:00

Haiti	2–4	Canada
Mondésir 80', 89'	Report	Raimondo 55', 75'; Kats 60'; Flynn 73'

Grenada Athletic Stadium, St. George's
Referee: Karen Abt (United States)

=== Final ===
13 March 2016
18:00

Mexico	1–2	United States
Ovalle 70'	Report	Sanchez 43'; Kuhlmann 86'

Grenada Athletic Stadium, St. George's
Attendance: 1,500
Referee: Marie-Soleil Beaudoin (Canada)

== Winners ==
2016 CONCACAF Women's U-17 Championship

United States
Third title

== Qualified teams for FIFA U-17 Women's World Cup ==
The following three teams from CONCACAF qualified for the FIFA U-17 Women's World Cup.

Team	Qualified on	Previous appearances in tournament^{1}
United States	11 March 2016	2 (2008, 2012)
Mexico	11 March 2016	3 (2010, 2012, 2014)
Canada	13 March 2016	4 (2008, 2010, 2012, 2014)

^{1} Bold indicates champion for that year. Italic indicates host for that year.

== Goalscorers ==
7 goals

- (Haiti) Nérilia Mondésir

5 goals

- (Haiti) Mikerline Saint-Félix
- (United States) Frankie Tagliaferri
- (United States) Ashley Sanchez

4 goals

- (United States) Civana Kuhlmann

3 goals

- (Canada) Teni Akindoju
- (Haiti) Melissa Dacius

2 goals

- (Canada) Jordyn Huitema
- (Canada) Vital Kats
- (Canada) Lauren Raimondo
- (Canada) Sarah Stratigakis
- (Costa Rica) Gloriana Villalobos
- (Guatemala) María Herrarte
- (Guatemala) Yuvitza Mayén
- (Guatemala) Niurka Oliva
- (Haiti) Lovelie Pierre
- (Mexico) Dayana Cazares
- (Mexico) Daniela Espinosa
- (Mexico) Montserrat Hernández
- (Mexico) Lizbeth Ovalle
- (United States) Alexa Spaanstra

1 goal

- (Canada) Nahida Baalbaki
- (Canada) Kennedy Faulknor
- (Canada) Shana Flynn
- (Canada) Jayde Riviere
- (Costa Rica) Merilyn Alvarado
- (Costa Rica) Valeria del Campo
- (Costa Rica) María Paula Salas
- (Guatemala) Didra Martínez
- (Guatemala) Adriana Ordóñez
- (Haiti) Melchie Dumonay
- (Haiti) Roseline Éloissaint
- (Haiti) Martine Olivier
- (Jamaica) Ebony Clarke
- (Jamaica) Tarania Clarke
- (Jamaica) Shayla Smart
- (Mexico) Maricarmen Reyes
- (United States) Jordan Canniff
- (United States) Sophia Smith

Own goal

- (Grenada) Resheda Charles (playing against Guatemala)

== Awards ==
The following awards were given at the conclusion of the tournament.

Golden Ball	Golden Boot	Golden Glove
(United States) Ashley Sanchez	(Haiti) Nérilia Mondésir	(United States) Laurel Ivory
CONCACAF Fair Play Award
Mexico

Best XI

- Goalkeeper: (United States) Laurel Ivory
- Right Defender: (United States) Kennedy Wesley
- Central Defender: (United States) Naomi Girma
- Central Defender: (Mexico) Kimberly Rodríguez
- Left Defender: (Canada) Julia Grosso
- Right Midfielder: (Haiti) Nérilia Mondésir
- Central Midfielder: (United States) Brianna Pinto
- Central Midfielder: (United States) Jaelin Howell
- Left Midfielder: (Mexico) Lizbeth Ovalle
- Forward: (United States) Ashley Sanchez
- Forward: (United States) Civana Kuhlmann
