= Asha James =

Tobagonian javelin thrower, Beach soccer player & Footballer (born 1999)

Personal information
- Date of birth: 5 December 1999 (age 26)
- Place of birth: Canaan, Tobago, Trinidad and Tobago
- Height: 1.65 m (5 ft 5 in)
- Position: Midfielder

Team information
- Current team: AC Port of Spain (Trinidad)
- Number: 10

Youth career
- Signal Hill Secondary School

College career
Years	Team	Apps	(Gls)
2017	FIU Panthers	12	(0)
2020–2023	West Texas A&M Buffaloes	52	(29)

Senior career*
Years	Team	Apps	(Gls)
2023–	Valadares Gaia		

International career^{‡}
2013- present	Trinidad and Tobago U17	1+	(1)
2017	Trinidad and Tobago (beach soccer)		
2019–	Trinidad and Tobago	20	(4)
- * Club domestic league appearances and goals as of 20 May 2021 ‡ National team caps and goals as of 11:03, April 18, 2026 (UTC)

Asha James (born 5 December 1999) is a Tobagonian javelin thrower, beach soccer player and a footballer who plays as a midfielder for Valadares Gaia in Portugal and for the Trinidad and Tobago women's national team.

== Early life ==
James was raised in Canaan, Tobago.

== Professional career ==
James signed her first professional contract in 2023, joining Portuguese club Valadares Gaia.

== International career ==
James represented Trinidad and Tobago at the 2016 CONCACAF Women's U-17 Championship qualification. At senior level, she capped during the 2020 CONCACAF Women's Olympic Qualifying Championship qualification.
