= Lysianne Proulx =

Canadian soccer player (born 1999)

Personal information
- Date of birth: April 17, 1999 (age 27)
- Place of birth: Longueuil, Quebec, Canada
- Height: 1.73 m (5 ft 8 in)
- Position: Goalkeeper

Team information
- Current team: Ipswich Town

Youth career
- 2004–2009: CS Boucherville
- 2009–2013: CS Roussillon
- 2014–2015: FC St-Léonard
- 2016–2017: AS Varennes

College career
Years	Team	Apps	(Gls)
2017–2021	Syracuse Orange	52	(0)

Senior career*
Years	Team	Apps	(Gls)
2014	Laval Comets		
2022	FC Laval	4	(0)
2022–2023	Torreense	17	(0)
2023–2024	Melbourne City	14	(0)
2024	Bay FC	6	(0)
2024–2026	Juventus	4	(0)
2026–	Ipswich Town	2	(0)

International career^{‡}
2014	Canada U15	5	(0)
2016	Canada U17	6	(0)
2015–2018	Canada U20	4	(0)
2024–	Canada	3	(0)
- * Club domestic league appearances and goals as of 22:03, 7 May 2026 (UTC) ‡ National team caps and goals as of February 25, 2025

Lysianne Proulx (born April 17, 1999) is a Canadian soccer player who plays as a goalkeeper for Ipswich Town in the Women's Super League 2 and the Canada national team.

== Early life ==
Proulx began playing youth soccer in 2004, at age four with CS Boucherville, playing there until the U10 level. She began playing goalkeeper at age 7. From 2009 to 2013, she played with CS Roussillon, later joining FC St-Léonard in 2014. She also represented the Rive-Sud regional district team and the Québec provincial team. In 2014, she was named the ARS Young Player of Excellence. In 2016, she was named the FSQ Female Youth Player of Excellence.

== College career ==
In January 2017, she committed to attend Syracuse University in the fall, where she would play for the women's soccer team. She made her debut on August 31, 2017, against the Cornell Big Red. In her junior season in 2019, she became the team's starter, starting all 16 games and led the ACC in saves with 96. In 2020, she ranked third in the NCAA in saves per game with 9.12. On October 2, 2021, she made a career-high 15 saves against the Duke Blue Devils. Over her five seasons, she appeared in 52 games, earning eight shutouts.

== Club career ==
In 2014, Proulx spent some time with the Laval Comets in the USL W-League.

In 2022, she played with FC Laval in the Première ligue de soccer du Québec.

In July 2022, she signed with Portuguese club Torreense in the Campeonato Nacional de Futebol Feminino. In her first season, she played in 18 games, across all competitions.

In August 2023, she joined Australian club Melbourne City in the A-League Women. She made her club debut on October 14, keeping a clean sheet in a 1–0 victory over Wellington Phoenix FC.

In February 2024, Proulx joined National Women's Soccer League expansion side Bay FC for a record-breaking fee for an outgoing transfer from Melbourne City FC. She appeared in the starting lineup of Bay FC's first-ever game, against Angel City FC on March 18, 2024, and impressed with eight saves in a 1–0 win. She started six of Bay's first seven games, before a suffering an injury and returning as the backup goalkeeper after with Katelyn Rowland in the starting role.

In August 2024, Proulx moved on a transfer to Italian Serie A club Juventus FC for an undisclosed fee. She made her debut on October 5, keeping a clean sheet in a 2–0 victory over Sampdoria. She was part of the squad which won the league title during her first season with the club. On February 3, 2026, she agreed to a mutual termination of the remainder of her contract with the club.

On February 4, 2026, she moved to Ipswich Town in the Women's Super League 2 through the end of the 2026-27 season, with the club's technical director Sean Burt saying of Proulx “She’s an outstanding goalkeeper whose knowledge and composure will raise standards across the group. Her experience at the highest level will be invaluable, particularly in big moments, and she’ll play an important role both on and off the pitch."

== International career ==
In September 2013, she made her debut in the Canadian youth program, attending a Canada U17 identification camp, under coach Bev Priestman (who would later become the senior national team coach). She was then subsequently named to the Canada U17 roster for the 2014 FIFA U-17 Women's World Cup. Later that year she played with the Canada U15 at the 2014 CONCACAF Girls' U-15 Championship, where she was named to the tournament Best XI and won the Golden Glove as the tournament's best goalkeeper. The following year, she was called up to the Canada U20 for the 2015 CONCACAF Women's U-20 Championship. At the 2016 FIFA U-17 Women's World Cup, she was named the Player of the Match against Germany U17. She continued to represent the youth squads, being named to the teams for the 2016 CONCACAF Women's U-17 Championship, 2016 FIFA U-20 Women's World Cup, and 2018 CONCACAF Women's U-20 Championship.

In June 2022, she was called up by the Canada senior team for the first time for a training camp. She was then named to the matchday squad for the first time ahead of a friendly against South Korea, before being named to the final squad for the 2022 CONCACAF W Championship. In July 2023, she was named to the squad for the 2023 FIFA Women's World Cup. She was named as an alternate for the roster at the 2024 Olympics. On November 29, 2024, she made her senior debut, coming on as a substitute at half time, in a friendly against Iceland, after several years of call-ups as a backup goalkeeper. On February 25, 2025, she earned her first start for the senior team, in a 2025 Pinatar Cup match against Chinese Taipei.
