= Alessandra Ramírez =

Mexican footballer (born 2000)

Alessandra Ramirez
Personal information
- Full name: Alessandra Ramirez Muñoz
- Date of birth: 14 December 2000 (age 25)
- Place of birth: Los Angeles, California, United States
- Height: 1.70 m (5 ft 7 in)
- Position: Defender

College career
Years	Team	Apps	(Gls)
2019–2020	Cerritos Falcons	18	(9)
2021–2022	Rio Hondo Roadrunners	15	(0)

Senior career*
Years	Team	Apps	(Gls)
2023–2024	Guadalajara	3	(0)
2024–2025	Santos Laguna	21	(0)
2025–2026	León	7	(1)

International career^{‡}
2015–2016	Mexico U-17		
- * Club domestic league appearances and goals as of 9 February 2026 ‡ National team caps and goals as of 29 February 2024

Alessandra Ramirez Muñoz (born 13 April 2000) is a professional footballer who plays as a Centre-back for Liga MX Femenil side Santos Laguna. Born and raised in the United States, she represents Mexico internationally.

== Career ==
In 2023, she started her career in Guadalajara. In 2024, she was transferred to Santos Laguna.

== International career ==
Ramirez represented Mexico at the 2016 CONCACAF Women's U-17 Championship.
