= Kennedy Faulknor =

Canadian soccer player (born 1999)

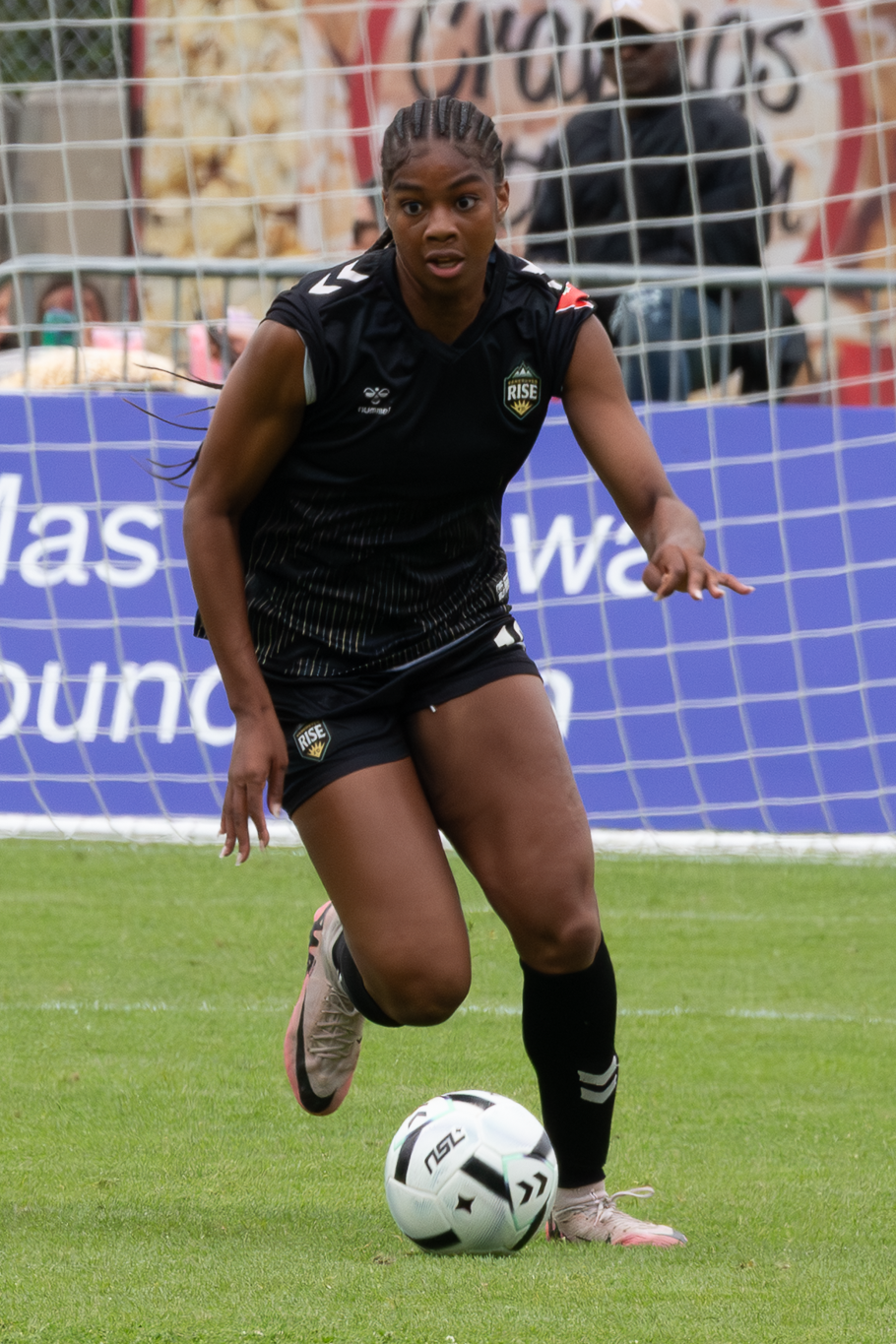
- Faulknor playing for Vancouver Rise FC in 2025

Personal information
- Full name: Kennedy Jade Faulknor
- Date of birth: June 30, 1999 (age 27)
- Place of birth: Scarborough, Ontario, Canada
- Height: 1.73 m (5 ft 8 in)
- Position: Centre-back

Team information
- Current team: Vancouver Rise FC
- Number: 16

Youth career
- 2007–2017: Unionville Milliken SC

College career
Years	Team	Apps	(Gls)
2017–2021	UCLA Bruins	67	(8)

Senior career*
Years	Team	Apps	(Gls)
2017	Unionville Milliken SC	2	(0)
2022–2023	Canberra United	14	(1)
2023	Minnesota Aurora	2	(1)
2025–	Vancouver Rise FC	14	(0)

International career^{‡}
2014	Canada U15	6	(0)
2016	Canada U17	3	(1)
2015	Canada	4	(0)
- * Club domestic league appearances and goals as of 17 October 2025 ‡ National team caps and goals as of October 16, 2017

Kennedy Jade Faulknor (born June 30, 1999) is a Canadian soccer player who plays as a centre-back for Vancouver Rise FC in the Northern Super League. In 2015, she represented the Canadian national team, where, at the age of 16, she was the youngest centre-back to ever play for Canada.

== Early life ==
Born in Scarborough, to a Jamaican father and a Canadian mother, she grew up in nearby Markham. Faulknor began playing youth soccer with the Unionville Milliken SC at age five, playing rep since age eight. With the UMSC 1999 Girls, she served as team captain, was leading scorer in 2009, 2011, 2012 and 2013, was team MVP in 2012 and 2013, and was named to the Provincial All-Star Team in 2013 and 2014 at U14 and U15 level, respectively.

== College career ==
In May 2015, she committed to attend UCLA to play for the UCLA Bruins on a full scholarship, beginning in 2017. She made her debut on September 3, 2017, playing against the Weber State Wildcats. She scored her first goal on September 13, 2018 against the Loyola Marymount Lions.

== Club career ==
In 2017, she played two games with Unionville Milliken SC in League1 Ontario.

In February 2022, she attended preseason with the Houston Dash of the National Women's Soccer League.

In October 2022, Faulknor joined Australian A-League Women club Canberra United.

In April 2023, Faulknor joined Minnesota Aurora in the USL W League.

In 2025, she joined Northern Super League club Vancouver Rise FC.

== International career ==
Faulknor was called up to the national team program for the first time at age 14 in June 2014 for a U15 national team camp. She was then named to the U15 squad for the 2014 CONCACAF Girls' U-15 Championship. Faulknor won gold with Canada at the tournament and was named to the Tournament Best XI.

In December 2015, at the age of 16, Faulknor was first called up to the Canadian senior squad, being selected for the 2015 International Women's Football Tournament of Natal. She made her debut starting in the first match of the group stage, in which Canada beat Mexico 3–0, becoming the youngest centre-back to ever appear for Canada.

In December 2015, Faulknor was named Canadian U-17 Women's Player of the Year.

In March 2016, Faulknor was selected for Canada's under-17 squad for the 2016 CONCACAF Women's U-17 Championship. She scored her first international goal against Grenada U20 on March 5. In the next match against Haiti, she suffered a concussion, sidelining her for the remainder of the tournament.
