= Jody Brown =

Jamaican footballer (born 2002)

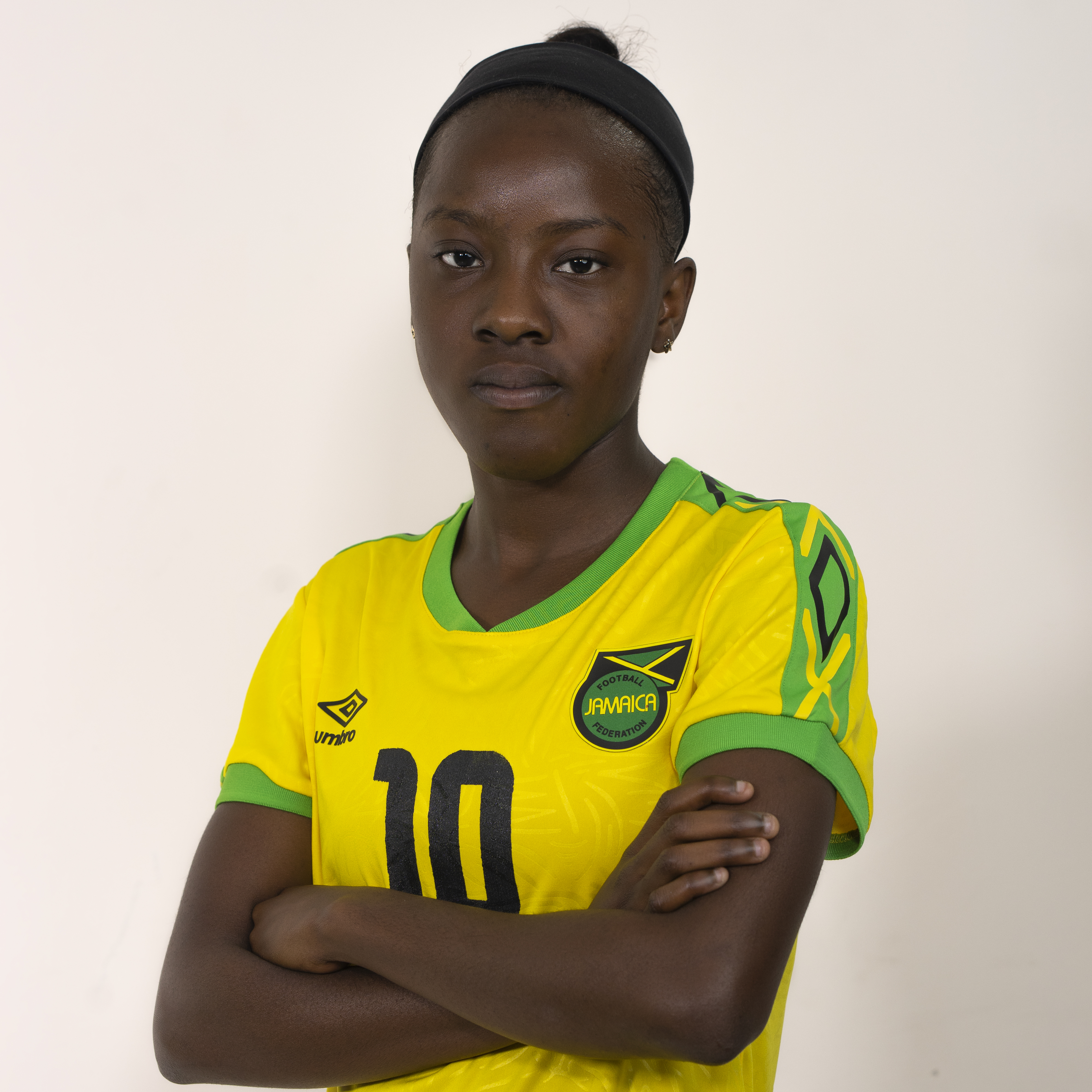

Personal information
- Full name: Jody Kimone Brown
- Date of birth: 16 April 2002 (age 24)
- Place of birth: Portmore, Jamaica
- Height: 1.63 m (5 ft 4 in)
- Position: Forward

Team information
- Current team: Marseille
- Number: 11

Youth career
- 2018–2020: Montverde Academy

College career
Years	Team	Apps	(Gls)
2020–2023	Florida State Seminoles	84	(24)

Senior career*
Years	Team	Apps	(Gls)
2024–2025	Benfica	14	(4)
2025–	Marseille	0	(0)

International career^{‡}
2014–2016	Jamaica U15	3+	(5)
2015–2017	Jamaica U17	5+	(8)
2017–2022	Jamaica U20	8	(11)
2018–	Jamaica	46	(20)
Medal record
Representing Jamaica
CONCACAF W Championship
Third place	2018 United States
Third place	2022 Mexico
- * Club domestic league appearances and goals as of 10 November 2024 ‡ National team caps and goals as of 29 November 2025

Jody Kimone Brown (born 16 April 2002) is a Jamaican footballer who plays as a forward for Première Ligue club Marseille and the Jamaica women's national team. She played college soccer with the Florida State Seminoles.

== Early life and education ==
Brown attended Montverde Academy in Montverde, Florida, a town near Orlando, where she helped lead the soccer team to back-to-back state championships in 2018–19. As a junior in 2019, she recorded 32 goals and 9 assists. The same year, she was named Girls Soccer Player of the Year by the Orlando Sentinel and Florida Dairy Farmers Miss Soccer.

After graduating from Montverde Academy, Brown moved to Florida State University in August 2020.

== International career ==
Brown has represented Jamaica on the senior national team as well as the under-15, under-17, and under-20 national teams. She competed at two CONCACAF Girls' Under-15 Championship editions in (2014 and 2016), the 2016 CONCACAF Women's U-17 Championship, the 2018 CONCACAF Women's U-20 Championship and the 2018 CONCACAF Women's U-17 Championship qualification. She made her senior debut in 2018 at the age of 16. The same year, she was the youngest player competing at the 2018 CONCACAF Women's Championship, the qualifying tournament for the 2019 FIFA Women's World Cup. Brown was the top scorer of the tournament with four goals.

At age 17, Brown was selected for Jamaica's 2019 Women's World Cup squad. She made her World Cup debut during the team's first group stage match against Brazil in Grenoble.

== Career statistics ==
=== International goals ===
Scores and results list Jamaica's goal tally first

No.	Date	Venue	Opponent	Score	Result	Competition
1	23 July 2018	Estadio Moderno Julio Torres, Barranquilla, Colombia	Colombia	2–1	2–1	2018 Central American and Caribbean Games
2	31 August 2018	National Stadium, Kingston, Jamaica	Trinidad and Tobago	4–1	4–1	2018 CONCACAF Women's Championship qualification
3	2 September 2018	National Stadium, Kingston, Jamaica	Cuba	4–0	6–1	2018 CONCACAF Women's Championship qualification
4	11 October 2018	H-E-B Park, Edinburg, United States	Cuba	2–0	9–0	2018 CONCACAF Women's Championship
5	11 October 2018	H-E-B Park, Edinburg, United States	Cuba	4–0	9–0	2018 CONCACAF Women's Championship
6	11 October 2018	H-E-B Park, Edinburg, United States	Cuba	7–0	9–0	2018 CONCACAF Women's Championship
7	17 October 2018	Toyota Stadium, Frisco, United States	Panama	1–0	2–2	2018 CONCACAF Women's Championship
8	3 March 2019	Catherine Hall Sports Complex, Montego Bay, Jamaica	Chile	3–2	3–2	Friendly
9	17 February 2022	National Stadium, Kingston, Jamaica	Bermuda	1–0	4–0	2022 CONCACAF W Championship qualification
10	20 February 2022	Kirani James Stadium, St. George's, Grenada	Grenada	2–0	6–1	2022 CONCACAF W Championship qualification
11	20 February 2022	Kirani James Stadium, St. George's, Grenada	Grenada	4–1	6–1	2022 CONCACAF W Championship qualification
12	9 April 2022	Truman Bodden Stadium, George Town, Cayman Islands	Cayman Islands	3–0	9–0	2022 CONCACAF W Championship qualification
13	12 April 2022	Sabina Park, Kingston, Jamaica	Dominican Republic	1–0	5–1	2022 CONCACAF W Championship qualification
14	19 February 2023	CommBank Stadium, Sydney, Australia	Czech Republic	1–1	2–3	2023 Cup of Nations
15	23 February 2025	Estadio Alberto Gallardo, Lima, Peru	Peru	1–0	2–0	Friendly
16	28 October 2025	Ato Boldon Stadium, Couva, Trinidad and Tobago	Trinidad and Tobago	1–0	4–1	Friendly
17	28 October 2025	Ato Boldon Stadium, Couva, Trinidad and Tobago	Trinidad and Tobago	4–1	4–1	Friendly
18	29 November 2025	Daren Sammy Cricket Ground, Gros Islet, Saint Lucia	Dominica	4–0	18–0	2026 CONCACAF W Championship qualification
19	29 November 2025	Daren Sammy Cricket Ground, Gros Islet, Saint Lucia	Dominica	8–0	18–0	2026 CONCACAF W Championship qualification
20	29 November 2025	Daren Sammy Cricket Ground, Gros Islet, Saint Lucia	Dominica	13–0	18–0	2026 CONCACAF W Championship qualification
21	9 October 2026	Estadio Victoria, Aguascalientes, Mexico	Mexico	1–0	4–3	Friendly

== Honours ==
Florida State Seminoles

- NCAA Division I Women's Soccer Tournament: 2021, 2023
- ACC Women's Soccer Tournament: 2020, 2021, 2022, 2023
- ACC Women's Regular Season Champions: 2020, 2022

Benfica

- Campeonato Nacional Feminino: 2024–25
- Taça da Liga: 2024–25

Jamaica

- CONCACAF Women's Championship third place: 2018, 2022

Individual

- CONCACAF Women's Championship Young Player of the Tournament: 2018
- CONCACAF Women's Best XI: 2018
