= Tarania Clarke =

Jamaican footballer (1999–2019)

Personal information
- Full name: Tarania Caresh Clarke
- Date of birth: 3 October 1999
- Date of death: 31 October 2019 (aged 20)
- Place of death: Kingston, Jamaica
- Position: Midfielder

Senior career*
Years	Team	Apps	(Gls)
-2019	Waterhouse		

International career
2014	Jamaica U15	1+	(1)
2015–2016	Jamaica U17	4+	(6)
2019	Jamaica	3	(2)
- * Club domestic league appearances and goals

Tarania Caresh Clarke (3 October 1999 – 31 October 2019) was a Jamaican footballer who played as a midfielder for Waterhouse F.C. and the Jamaica women's national team. She also represented Jamaica on the under-17 and under-20 national teams.

On 31 October 2019, Clarke was stabbed to death in the Jamaican capital of Kingston, after a dispute over a mobile phone. A woman was arrested for her murder.

== Early life and education ==
Clarke graduated from Excelsior High School where she captained the soccer team for three years. She planned to attend Daytona State College in Florida.

== International career ==
Clarke represented Jamaica at the 2014 CONCACAF Girls' U-15 Championship, the 2016 CONCACAF Women's U-17 Championship qualification and the 2016 CONCACAF Women's U-17 Championship. She made her senior debut for Jamaica on 30 September 2019.

=== International goals ===
Scores and results list Jamaica's goal tally first

No.	Date	Venue	Opponent	Score	Result	Competition
1	30 September 2019	National Stadium, Kingston, Jamaica	Cuba	10–1	12–1	2020 CONCACAF Women's Olympic Qualifying Championship qualification
2	6 October 2019	National Stadium, Kingston, Jamaica	Saint Lucia	11–0	11-0	2020 CONCACAF Women's Olympic Qualifying Championship qualification

== Death ==
On 31 October 2019, Clarke was stabbed to death in the Jamaican capital of Kingston, after a dispute over a mobile phone. A woman was arrested for her murder.
