= Laurel Ivory =

American soccer player (born 1999)

- Ivory with the Boston Legacy in 2026

Personal information
- Full name: Laurel Carolyn Ivory
- Date of birth: August 28, 1999 (age 27)
- Place of birth: Atlanta, Georgia, United States
- Height: 5 ft 9 in (1.75 m)
- Position: Goalkeeper

Team information
- Current team: Boston Legacy
- Number: 18

College career
Years	Team	Apps	(Gls)
2017–2021	Virginia Cavaliers	100	(0)

Senior career*
Years	Team	Apps	(Gls)
2022–2024	Seattle Reign	9	(0)
2025	Kansas City Current	2	(0)
2026–	Boston Legacy	5	(0)

International career
2016	United States U17		
2017–2018	United States U20		
2019	United States U23		
- * Club domestic league appearances and goals as of 02:14, November 8, 2026 (UTC)

Laurel Carolyn Ivory (born August 28, 1999) is an American professional soccer player who plays as a goalkeeper for Boston Legacy FC of the National Women's Soccer League (NWSL) She played college soccer for the Virginia Cavaliers and began her professional career with the Seattle Reign in 2022. She also played for the Kansas City Current. She represented the United States at the 2016 FIFA U-17 World Cup and the 2018 FIFA U-20 World Cup.

== College career ==
Ivory played for Virginia Cavaliers from 2017 to 2021. She was considered one of the top collegiate goalkeepers. She recorded four consecutive shutouts in the NCAA tournament in 2019.

== Club career ==
Ivory signed with the OL Reign (later Seattle Reign FC) in 2022. She made her NWSL debut in the 2023 NWSL Challenge Cup.

On December 9, 2024, the Kansas City Current announced that Ivory had signed a contract for the 2025 season with a mutual option for 2026. On December 2, 2025, it was announced that Ivory would be departing the club as a free agent.

On December 17, 2025, Ivory was announced to have signed a two-year contract with NWSL expansion club Boston Legacy FC.

== International career ==
Ivory is a former United States youth international, representing the nation at the 2016 FIFA U-17 World Cup and the 2018 FIFA U-20 World Cup.

== Personal life ==
Ivory began dating Austin Katstra after meeting at the University of Virginia in 2017. They announced their engagement in July 2024.

== Honors ==
OL Reign

- NWSL Shield: 2022
- The Women's Cup: 2022

Kansas City Current

- NWSL Shield: 2025

United States U-17

- CONCACAF Women's U-17 Championship: 2016

Individual

- Second-team All-ACC: 2021
- Third-team All-ACC: 2019
- CONCACAF Women's U-17 Championship Golden Glove: 2016
