= Jordyn Huitema =

Canadian soccer player (born 2001)

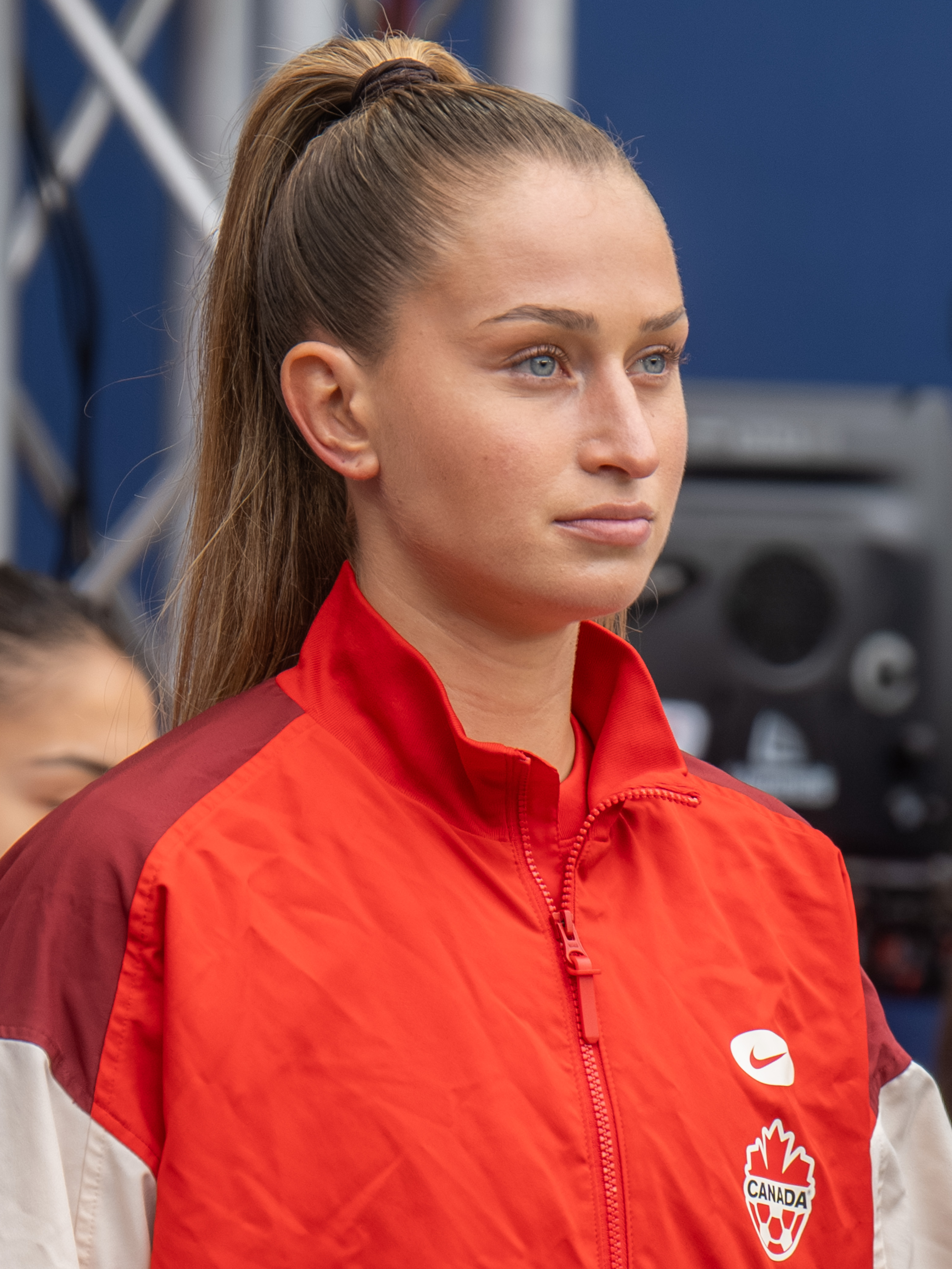
- Huitema with Canada in 2026

Personal information
- Full name: Jordyn Pamela Huitema
- Date of birth: May 8, 2001 (age 25)
- Place of birth: Chilliwack, British Columbia, Canada
- Height: 1.80 m (5 ft 11 in)
- Position: Forward

Team information
- Current team: Chicago Stars
- Number: 99

Youth career
- 2005–2011: Chilliwack FC
- 2012–2014: Surrey United
- 2015–2018: Vancouver Whitecaps

Senior career*
Years	Team	Apps	(Gls)
2018	TSS FC Rovers		
2019–2022	Paris Saint-Germain	45	(6)
2022–2025	Seattle Reign	70	(13)
2026–	Chicago Stars	12	(4)

International career^{‡}
2014–2016	Canada U15	11	(8)
2016–2018	Canada U17	18	(7)
2018	Canada U20	5	(5)
2017–	Canada	98	(24)
Medal record
Women's football
Representing Canada
Olympic Games
Gold medal – first place	2020 Tokyo	Team
CONCACAF W Championship
Runner-up	2018
Runner-up	2022
CONCACAF Women's U-17 Championship
Third place	2016
Third place	2018
CONCACAF Girls' Under-15 Championship
Winner	2014
Runner-up	2016
- * Club domestic league appearances and goals as of August 4, 2026 ‡ National team caps and goals as of June 9, 2026

Jordyn Pamela Huitema (/ˈhaɪtɪmə/ HY-tim-ə; born May 8, 2001) is a Canadian professional soccer player who plays as a forward for Chicago Stars FC of the National Women's Soccer League (NWSL) and the Canada national team.

Huitema made her senior national team debut at age 15 and scored her first international goal at 16, drawing headlines as a potential future star. She was a member of the Canada squad that won the nation's first gold in women's soccer at the 2020 Summer Olympics.

== Early life ==
Huitema was born in Chilliwack, British Columbia, 100 kilometres (60 mi) east of Vancouver. She began playing soccer at four years of age with Chilliwack FC. She attended middle school at Rosedale Middle School in Chilliwack. She attended Burnaby Central Secondary as part of the Whitecaps FC Girls Elite REX program. While in the program she befriended future Canadian national teammate Julia Grosso. Her brother, Brody, was a member of the Vancouver Whitecaps Residency program and played for Duke University. Her second brother, Trent, played ice hockey in the Saskatchewan Junior Hockey League for the Humboldt Broncos.

== Club career ==
=== Early career ===
Huitema played with TSS FC Rovers of the Women's Premier Soccer League for the 2018 season.

=== Paris Saint-Germain ===
Huitema first came to the notice of officials with Paris Saint-Germain when playing at the 2017 Algarve Cup with the Canadian national team. At the time, national teammate Ashley Lawrence played for PSG at the club level, and as a result the team's general manager was in attendance at the event for games where Huitema "just happened to get a lot of minutes and played well."

On July 23, 2018, it was announced that Huitema would play with PSG Féminines during the 2018 Women's International Champions Cup (WICC). She did not sign a professional contract with the team, allowing her to maintain college eligibility, as she was at the time also weighing offers to play for Stanford University or UCLA in the NCAA. She started for PSG during their pre-season friendly against Manchester City Women on July 24, at the University of Portland. Huitema was also in the starting lineup for PSG's semi-final match in the International Champions Cup, they lost 2–1 to the North Carolina Courage. On January 24, 2019, Huitema announced that she would forgo college and begin her professional career. On May 17, 2019, PSG confirmed Huitema had signed a four-year contract with the club.

On June 4, 2021, Huitema scored a header in the final minutes of a 3–0 victory over Dijon to seal the Division 1 Féminine title for Paris Saint-Germain, the first league title for the club. Overall she appeared in 16 games in her second season with the club, scoring three goals and two assists in sixteen games. Huitema became the top Canadian scorer in the UEFA Women's Champions League before she turned 20, a record subsequently surpassed by Cloé Lacasse.

Following her third season with PSG, Huitema contemplated making a move in order to obtain more starts and playing time than were available to her with PSG.

=== Seattle Reign ===
On June 18, 2022, Huitema transferred to American club Seattle Reign FC and signed a two-year contract. In the final of the 2022 edition of The Women's Cup, she scored her first goal for the team to give the Reign a 2–1 lead over Racing Louisville FC, ultimately proving to be the game-winning goal. She scored two goals in the remainder of the regular season, the second in the season-ending match with the Orlando Pride that saw the Reign clinch the NWSL Shield.

In September 2024, Huitema would sign a contract extension with Seattle through the end of the 2026 season, with a mutual option for 2027.

=== Chicago Stars ===
On March 12, 2026, Chicago Stars FC acquired Huitema in a trade with Seattle in exchange for $200,000 in allocation money and a $300,000 transfer fee. Huitema signed a three-year contract through the 2028 season. She scored her first goal for the Stars on March 22, 2026, netting Chicago's second goal in a 2–1 win over Kansas City Current. On 18 July 2026, she sustained an ACL injury during a 2–0 defeat against Angel City which would sideline her for several months, leading to her being put on the season-ending-injury list.

== International career ==
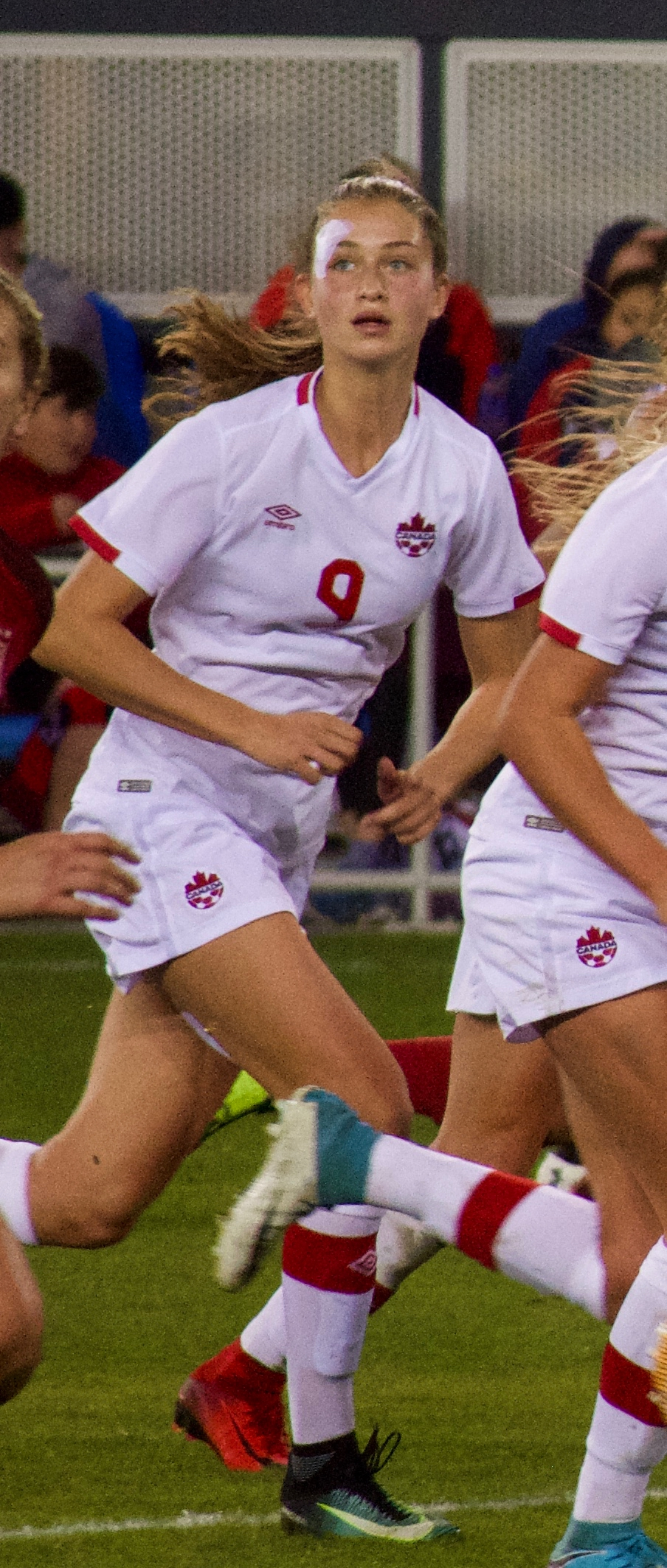
Huitema playing for Canada in 2017

=== Youth ===
Huitema made her first junior appearance for Canada with the national under-15 team on August 7, 2014, against Puerto Rico in a 5–0 victory at the CONCACAF Girls Under-15 Championship. The Canadians would go on to win the inaugural edition of the tournament in a penalty shoot-out, with Huitema scoring the winning shoot-out goal. She would go on to make 10 more appearances for the under-15 squad.

Huitema's debut for the under-17 team came on March 3, 2016, at the CONCACAF Women's Under-17 Championship in a 3–0 win against Guatemala. Huitema also played in the 2016 FIFA U-17 Women's World Cup. There, she scored her first goal in FIFA competition in a 3–2 win over Cameroon. She made 7 more appearances for the under-17 team. On July 6, 2017, Huitema made her first appearance for the under-20 team, scoring a goal in a 4–1 win over the United States. After scoring in a 3–1 loss to China in an under 17 match on July 12, 2017, Huitema became the first Canadian to score for the under 17, under 20 and senior national team in the same calendar year. In 2017, she was named the Canada U-17 Female Player of the Year for her performances with the U-17, U-20 and senior teams throughout the year.

On January 12, 2018, Huitema was named to Canada's squad for the 2018 CONCACAF Women's U-20 Championship in Trinidad and Tobago. In the first game of the tournament, Huitema scored twice in a 3–1 win over Costa Rica. In the second game, Huitema scored a hat-trick in a 4–1 win over hosts Trinidad & Tobago, which clinched Canada's progress into the semi-finals. She would play 66 minutes in a 4–0 victory over Haiti which resulted in Canada winning their group. In the semi-finals against Mexico, Huitema played the full game in a 1–1 draw. Canada would lose the match 4–3 on penalty kicks in which Huitema saw her attempt saved. Canada would require a win over Haiti in the third place match to qualify for the FIFA U-20 Women's World Cup in France later in the year. Canada would lose the match by a score of 1–0 and fail to qualify for the World Cup. Huitema was the tournament's top scorer with five goals and was named to the Best XI of the championship.

=== Senior ===
Huitema's senior national team debut came on March 8, 2017, in the final of the 2017 Algarve Cup versus Spain. The cap made her the third youngest player to appear in a match for the senior national team. Her first goal for the senior team came on June 11, 2017, in a friendly against Costa Rica at BMO Field in Toronto. The tally made her the second youngest goal scorer in the history of the national team. She would score a second goal less than a minute later. Huitema received a call-up to the national team for a two-game friendly series against the United States on November 9 and 12, 2017. She came into the first game as a substitute in the 90th minute for Janine Beckie at BC Place in Vancouver. In February 2018, Huitema was called into Canada's squad for the 2018 Algarve Cup by new coach Kenneth Heiner-Møller. Huitema would start the second match for Canada against Russia, drawing a first half penalty which was converted by captain Christine Sinclair, the lone goal in a 1–0 victory.

Huitema was selected to make her FIFA Women's World Cup debut after being named to the Canadian squad for the 2019 edition in France. She remarked that while this had been her goal since the fourth grade, "until honestly a few months ago, I never thought that it would be really there for me." Huitema made one on-field appearance during the tournament, starting in Canada's 2–1 loss to the Netherlands in the group stage and playing the full 90 minutes. The event ended in disappointment for the Canadians, who were eliminated in the Round of 16 by Sweden.

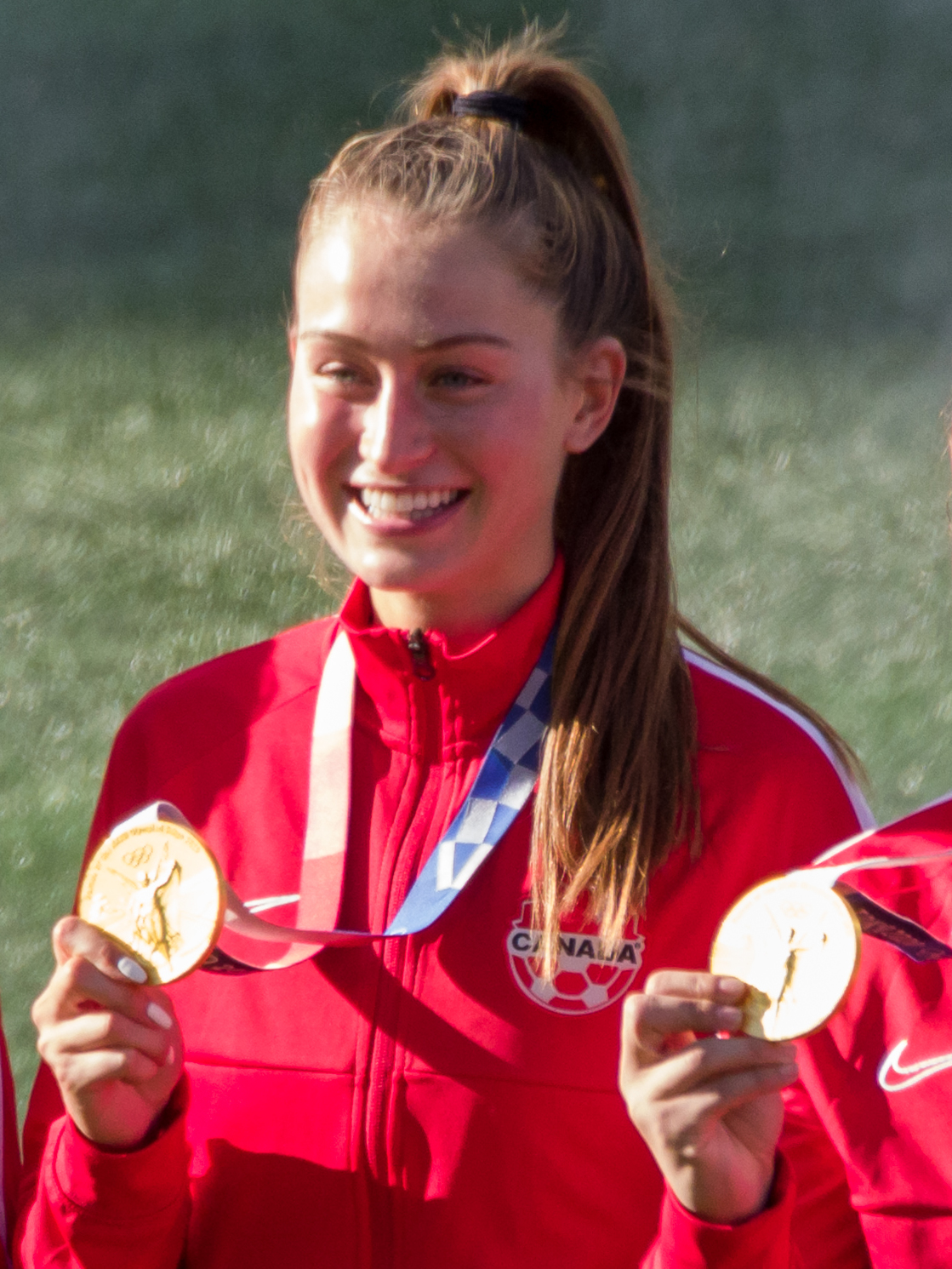
Huitema with her 2020 Olympic gold medal in 2021

The 2020 CONCACAF Women's Olympic Qualifying Championship proved to be a major showcase for Huitema, who lead the whole tournament in scoring with seven goals, including five goals in the group stage game against Jamaica and the lone goal in Canada's 1–0 semi-final victory over Costa Rica that resulted in Canada qualifying for the 2020 Summer Olympics in Tokyo. Shortly afterward, the onset of the COVID-19 pandemic delayed the Tokyo Olympics by a year. Huitema was named to the Canadian Olympic team. In the women's tournament Canada advanced to the Olympic final for the first time in its history, winning the gold medal. Huitema substituted Christine Sinclair at the 86 minute mark, playing 36 minutes in the championship game.

While Huitema's junior career and early debut with the national team had drawn widespread hopes that she would serve as a long-term replacement for Sinclair as Canada's elite striker, her lack of production against top opponents in the years immediately following the Tokyo Olympics began to generate discussion. A twelve-game goalless streak that spanned much of 2022 and 2023 ended on April 12, 2023 when she scored Canada's lone goal in a 2–1 loss to France. Named to her second World Cup team in advance of the 2023 edition in Australia and New Zealand, sports channel TSN noted "there is a lot of pressure on Huitema to take the next step forward." Canada would ultimately fail to advance past the group stage in Australia, scoring only two goals in three matches, which renewed discussions about the team's lack of offensive ability. Huitema recorded no goals or assists in the tournament, with assessments of her performance being mixed overall, disagreeing as to whether other attributes were sufficient given the lack of finishing ability shown.

Following the team's disappointment at the World Cup, coach Bev Priestman made a number of changes to the team's deployment for their next games, the CONCACAF Olympic qualification playoff against Jamaica, which included using Huitema as a substitute rather than a starter in both legs. She scored the game-winning goal of the second match.

Opening 2024 at the inaugural edition of the CONCACAF W Gold Cup, Huitema scored a goal in Canada's opening group stage game against El Salvador, and a second against Costa Rica in the third. She scored her third goal of the tournament in the semi-final against the United States, an equalizer that would ultimately send the game to extra time, and subsequently to penalties. Huitema missed on her attempt, with Canada ultimately losing 1–3 and exiting.

On July 1, 2024, Huitema was named to the Canadian Olympic team in the women's tournament. This will be her second Olympic Games.

== Personal life ==
Huitema was in a long-term relationship with Bayern Munich player and fellow Canadian Alphonso Davies from 2017 to 2022. On May 22, 2022, Davies confirmed on social media that the two had separated. On November 1, 2022, it was confirmed that Huitema was dating Seattle Mariners baseball player Julio Rodríguez.

On May 1, 2025, Huitema was present during a home invasion of Rodriguez's Mercer Island home, while he was with the team on the road trip. She barricaded herself in the bathroom and was apparently not discovered.

== Career statistics ==
=== Club ===
As of August 4, 2026

Club	Season	League			Cup		Continental		Other		Total	
Club	Season	Division	Apps	Goals	Apps	Goals	Apps	Goals	Apps	Goals	Apps	Goals
Paris Saint-Germain	2019–20	D1F	11	1	3	0	4	4	1 (Note: Includes the Trophée des Championnes)	0	19	5
Paris Saint-Germain	2020–21	D1F	16	3	1	0	6	2	—		23	5
Paris Saint-Germain	2021–22	D1F	18	2	4	0	7	6	—		29	8
Paris Saint-Germain	Total		45	6	8	0	17	12	1	0	71	18
Seattle Reign FC	2022	NWSL	10	2	—		—		1 (Note: Includes one game in the NWSL Playoffs)	0	11	2
Seattle Reign FC	2023	NWSL	20	5	4	2	0	0	2	0	26	7
Seattle Reign FC	2024	NWSL	18	3	0	0	0	0	0	0	18	3
Seattle Reign FC	2025	NWSL	22	3	0	0	0	0	1	0	23	3
Seattle Reign FC	Total		70	13	4	2	0	0	4	0	78	15
Chicago Stars	2026	NWSL	12	4	0	0	0	0	0	0	12	4
Career total			127	23	12	2	17	12	4	0	161	37

=== International ===
As of match played June 9, 2026

Appearances and goals by national team and year
National team	Year	Apps	Goals
Canada	2017	7	2
Canada	2018	8	4
Canada	2019	10	0
Canada	2020	8	7
Canada	2021	12	1
Canada	2022	15	1
Canada	2023	13	3
Canada	2024	13	3
Canada	2025	8	2
Canada	2026	4	1
Total		98	24

Scores and results list Canada's goal tally first, score column indicates score after each Huitema goal.

List of international goals scored by Jordyn Huitema
No.	Date	Venue	Opponent	Score	Result	Competition
1	June 11, 2017	BMO Field, Toronto, Canada	Costa Rica	5–0	6–0	Friendly
2	June 11, 2017	BMO Field, Toronto, Canada	Costa Rica	6–0	6–0	Friendly
3	October 8, 2018	H-E-B Park, Edinburg, United States	Cuba	2–0	12–0	2018 CONCACAF Women's Championship
4	October 8, 2018	H-E-B Park, Edinburg, United States	Cuba	5–0	12–0	2018 CONCACAF Women's Championship
5	October 8, 2018	H-E-B Park, Edinburg, United States	Cuba	6–0	12–0	2018 CONCACAF Women's Championship
6	October 8, 2018	H-E-B Park, Edinburg, United States	Cuba	11–0	12–0	2018 CONCACAF Women's Championship
7	January 29, 2020	H-E-B Park, Edinburg, United States	Saint Kitts and Nevis	10–0	11–0	2020 CONCACAF Women's Olympic Qualifying Championship
8	February 1, 2020	H-E-B Park, Edinburg, United States	Jamaica	1–0	9–0	2020 CONCACAF Women's Olympic Qualifying Championship
9	February 1, 2020	H-E-B Park, Edinburg, United States	Jamaica	5–0	9–0	2020 CONCACAF Women's Olympic Qualifying Championship
10	February 1, 2020	H-E-B Park, Edinburg, United States	Jamaica	6–0	9–0	2020 CONCACAF Women's Olympic Qualifying Championship
11	February 1, 2020	H-E-B Park, Edinburg, United States	Jamaica	8–0	9–0	2020 CONCACAF Women's Olympic Qualifying Championship
12	February 1, 2020	H-E-B Park, Edinburg, United States	Jamaica	9–0	9–0	2020 CONCACAF Women's Olympic Qualifying Championship
13	February 7, 2020	Dignity Health Sports Park, Carson, United States	Costa Rica	1–0	1–0	2020 CONCACAF Women's Olympic Qualifying Championship
14	November 27, 2021	Centro de Alto Rendimiento, Mexico City, Mexico	Mexico	2–1	2–1	Friendly
15	July 5, 2022	Estadio BBVA, Guadalupe, Nuevo León, Mexico	Trinidad and Tobago	6–0	6–0	2022 CONCACAF W Championship
16	April 11, 2023	Stade Marie-Marvingt, Le Mans, France	France	1–2	1–2	Friendly
17	September 26, 2023	BMO Field, Toronto, Canada	Jamaica	2–1	2–1	CONCACAF Olympic play-off
18	October 31, 2023	Wanderers Grounds, Halifax, Canada	Brazil	1–0	2–0	Friendly
19	February 22, 2024	Shell Energy Stadium, Houston, United States	El Salvador	2–0	6–0	2024 CONCACAF W Gold Cup
20	February 28, 2024	Shell Energy Stadium, Houston, United States	Costa Rica	1–0	3–0	2024 CONCACAF W Gold Cup
21	March 6, 2024	Snapdragon Stadium, San Diego, United States	United States	1–1	2–2	2024 CONCACAF W Gold Cup
22	February 25, 2025	Pinatar Arena, San Pedro del Pinatar, Spain	Chinese Taipei	3–0	7–0	2025 Pinatar Cup
23	February 25, 2025	Pinatar Arena, San Pedro del Pinatar, Spain	Chinese Taipei	6–0	7–0	2025 Pinatar Cup
24	June 9, 2026	Estadio Piedades de Santa Ana, Santa Ana, Costa Rica	Costa Rica	5–0	6–0	Friendly

== Honours ==
Paris Saint-Germain

- Division 1 Féminine: 2020–21
- Coupe de France féminine: 2021–22; runner-up: 2019–20

OL Reign

- NWSL Shield: 2022

Canada

- Summer Olympics: 2021
- Pinatar Cup: 2025
- CONCACAF W Championship Runner-up: 2018, 2022

Individual

- Canada U-20 Female Player of the Year: 2018
- Canada U-17 Female Player of the Year: 2017
- CONCACAF Women's Olympic Qualifying Best XI: 2020
- CONCACAF Women's Olympic Qualifying Golden Boot: 2020
- CONCACAF Women's U-20 Championship Best XI: 2018
- CONCACAF Women's U-20 Championship Golden Boot: 2018
- CONCACAF Girls' Under-15 Championship Best XI: 2016
- Vancouver Whitecaps FC Most Promising Player–Female: 2017
