= Anyssa Ibrahim =

Haitian footballer (born 1999)

Personal information
- Full name: Anyssa J. Ibrahim
- Date of birth: 8 February 1999 (age 27)
- Place of birth: Montreal, Quebec, Canada
- Height: 1.65 m (5 ft 5 in)
- Position: Midfielder

Team information
- Current team: Albergaria
- Number: 8

College career
Years	Team	Apps	(Gls)
2017	South Florida Bulls	15	(0)
2019	George Washington Revolutionaries	21	(2)
2021–2022	UQAM Citadins		

Senior career*
Years	Team	Apps	(Gls)
2018–2019	FC Sélect Rive-Sud	18	(0)
2020	CS Longueuil	4	(1)
2021–2022	FC Laval (Note: CS Monteuil changed its name to FC Laval in 2022)	15	(2)
2023–2024	Turbine Potsdam	6	(0)
2024–	Albergaria	17	(1)

International career^{‡}
2014	Canada U15	6	(5)
2013–2016	Canada U17	8	(0)
2015–2016	Canada U20	6	(0)
2024–	Haiti	1	(0)
- * Club domestic league appearances and goals as of March 15, 2025 ‡ National team caps and goals as of 17 February 2024

Anyssa Ibrahim (born 8 February 1999) is a professional footballer who plays as a midfielder for Campeonato Nacional Feminino club Albergaria. Born in Canada, she plays for the Haiti national team.

== Early life ==
Ibrahim began playing youth soccer at age four with AS St-Michel. She later played with CS Terrebonne and PEF Quebec. She later played with AS Varennes. She represented Team Quebec at the 2017 Canada Summer Games.

== College career ==
In 2017, Ibrahim began attending the University of South Florida where she played for the women's soccer team. She did not play in the 2018 season.

In 2019, she began attending George Washington University to play for the women's soccer team. She scored her first goal on September 19, 2019, against the UMBC Retrievers.

In 2020, she returned to Canada to attend the Université du Québec à Montréal and play for the women's soccer team, beginning in 2021 as the 2020 season was cancelled due to the COVID-19 pandemic. In 2021, she was named an RSEQ Second Team All Star. In September 2022, she was named the RSEQ Athlete of the Week. At the end of the 2022 season, she was named an RSEQ First Team All-Star and a U Sports Second Team All-Star.

== Club career ==
In 2018, Ibrahim began playing with FC Sélect Rive-Sud in the Première ligue de soccer du Québec, serving as team captain. In 2020, she played with CS Longueuil. In 2021, she began playing with CS Monteuil (later renamed FC Laval in 2022).

In October 2023, she signed with German club 1. FFC Turbine Potsdam in the second tier 2. Frauen-Bundesliga. She helped the club win the league that season.

In August 2024, she signed with Portuguese Campeonato Nacional Feminino club Albergaria.

== International career ==
Ibrahim was born in Canada to parents of Egyptian and Haitian descent.

She represented Canada at the U12 Danone Nations Cup. In September 2013, she debuted in the Canada Soccer program, attending a camp with the Canada U17 team. She then appeared at several tournaments with the Canada U15 team, U17, and Canada U20 teams: 2013 CONCACAF Women's U-17 Championship (winning silver), 2014 FIFA U-17 Women's World Cup, 2014 CONCACAF Girls' U-15 Championship (winning gold), 2015 CONCACAF Women's U-20 Championship (winning silver), 2016 FIFA U-17 Women's World Cup, and the 2016 FIFA U-20 Women's World Cup. At the 2014 CONCACAF U15 Championship, she was named to the tournament Best XI.

In November 2023, she switched her international allegiance to begin representing Haiti at international level. In February 2024, she received her first call-up to the Haiti national team for 2024 CONCACAF W Gold Cup qualification matches.
