= Nelourde Nicolas =

Haitian footballer (born 1999)

Personal information
- Date of birth: 26 July 1999 (age 27)
- Place of birth: Léogâne, Haiti
- Position: Midfielder

Team information
- Current team: Saint-Denis
- Number: 18

Senior career*
Years	Team	Apps	(Gls)
2020–	Saint-Denis	2	(0)

International career^{‡}
2018	Haiti U20	7	(1)
2018–	Haiti	1+	(1)
- * Club domestic league appearances and goals as of 26 January 2020 ‡ National team caps and goals as of 18 April 2018

Nelourde Nicolas (born 26 July 1999) is a Haitian footballer who plays as a midfielder for French club RC Saint-Denis and the Haiti women's national team.

== International goals ==
Scores and results list Haiti's goal tally first

No.	Date	Venue	Opponent	Score	Result	Competition
9	18 April 2018	Stade Sylvio Cator, Port-au-Prince, Haiti	U.S. Virgin Islands	6–0	7–0	2018 CFU Women's Challenge Series
