= Sarah Stratigakis =

Canadian soccer player (born 1999)

- Sarah Stratigakis

Personal information
- Full name: Sarah Anne Stratigakis
- Date of birth: March 7, 1999 (age 27)
- Place of birth: Toronto, Ontario, Canada
- Height: 1.60 m (5 ft 3 in)
- Position: Midfielder

Team information
- Current team: AFC Toronto

Youth career
- –2014: Woodbridge Strikers
- 2014–2016: Unionville Milliken SC

College career
Years	Team	Apps	(Gls)
2017–2021	Michigan Wolverines	70	(18)

Senior career*
Years	Team	Apps	(Gls)
2016–2017	Aurora FC	15	(13)
2018	Oakville Blue Devils FC	3	(5)
2019	Motor City FC	6	(0)
2019	Oakville Blue Devils FC	2	(4)
2022–2023	Vittsjö GIK	52	(8)
2024	Bristol City	6	(0)
2024–2025	Saint-Étienne	20	(1)
2025–	AFC Toronto	35	(7)

International career^{‡}
2014	Canada U15	6	(5)
2013–2016	Canada U17	16	(3)
2015–2018	Canada U20	13	(2)
2015	Canada U23	3	(0)
2015–	Canada	5	(1)
Medal record
Women's football
Representing Canada
CONCACAF Girls' Under-15 Championship
Winner	2014
- * Club domestic league appearances and goals as of October 28, 2026 ‡ National team caps and goals as of July 24, 2022

Sarah Anne Stratigakis (born March 7, 1999) is a Canadian soccer player who plays as a midfielder for AFC Toronto in the Northern Super League and the Canada national team.

== Early life ==
Stratigakis was eight years old when she started playing soccer. She played youth soccer with Woodbridge Strikers and Unionville Milliken SC.

== College career ==
In 2017, she began attending the University of Michigan, where she played for the women's soccer team. She made her debut on August 17, scoring 7 minutes and 16 seconds into her debut in a 2-0 victory over the Washington Huskies. In her freshman season, she was named to the Big Ten All-Freshman Team and the Big Ten Second Team All-Star. In 2018, she was once again named to the All-Big 10 Second Team. In 2019, she was named Big Ten Midfielder of the Year, an All-Big 0 First Team All-Star, and a Second Team All-American. In 2020, she was an Academic All-Big Ten Selections. In 2021, she was named to the All-Big Ten Second Team for the fourth time, which along with her First Team selection in 2019, set a school record for being named to the conference all-star teams five times. She was also named to the United Soccer Coaches All-North Region Second Team in 2021.

== Club career ==
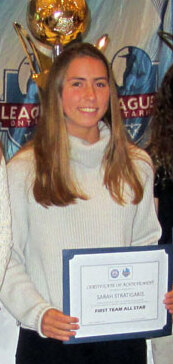
Stratigakis receiving L1O All-Star Award in 2016

In 2016 and 2017, Stratigakis began playing for Aurora FC in League1 Ontario. She made her debut on May 7, 2016 against Vaughan Azzurri. She scored her first goals on May 28, netting a brace against the Kingston Clippers in a 3-3 draw. On August 20, she scored a hat trick against the Sanjaxx Lions. That season, she was named to the mid-season L1O All-Star team that faced the Quebec all-stars, was named the league Young Player of the Year, and was named to the league First Team All-Star. The following season, she scored four goals in five appearances and was once again named to the mid-season all-star game.

In 2018, she joined Oakville Blue Devils FC in League1 Ontario, scoring five goals in only 3 appearances, including a hat trick on August 21 against Darby FC. In 2019, she played with Motor City FC in the Women's Premier Soccer League, before returning to the Blue Devils, where she scored four goals in only two appearances, netting a brace in each match.

In 2022, she joined Swedish club Vittsjö GIK in the first-tier Damallsvenskan.

In January 2024, Stratigakis would sign a contract with Women's Super League(WSL) club Bristol City until the end of the 2024-25 season. Upon Bristol City's relegation from the WSL at the conclusion of the 2023-24 season, it was announced that Stratigakis left the club.

In August 2024, she joined French club Saint-Étienne in the Première Ligue.

In June 2025, she returned to Canada to sign with AFC Toronto in the Northern Super League. On September 13, 2025, she scored her first goal, in a 7-0 victory over Vancouver Rise FC. Stratigakis was part of the AFC Toronto team which won the first-ever Supporters’ Shield in NSL history. She scored and provided an assist in the opening game of the 2026 season, a 3-2 win over the Vancouver Rise on April 24, 2026.

== International career ==
Stratigakis has represented Canada on the under-15, under-17, under-20 and senior national teams.

In August 2014, she was named the most valuable player (MVP) of the 2014 CONCACAF Girls' U-15 Championship where Canada won gold. In December 2015, she scored a brace against Honduras at the 2015 CONCACAF Women's U-20 Championship to lift Canada to the semifinals. She scored the team's only goal in Canada's 1–2 loss to Haiti. She was named the tournament's best midfielder at the 2014 FIFA U-17 Women's World Cup at the age of 15 after helping Canada reach the quarterfinals. At the 2016 FIFA U-17 Women's World Cup, she served as team captain.

In July 2015, Stratigakis made her debut for the senior national team at the Pan Am Games at the age of 16. She scored her first goal for the national team at the 2021 SheBelieves Cup, against Argentina.

== Career statistics ==
=== International ===
Scores and results list Canada's goal tally first, score column indicates score after each Stratigakis goal.

List of international goals scored by Sarah Stratigakis

No.	Date	Venue	Opponent	Score	Result	Competition
1.	24 February 2021	Exploria Stadium, Orlando, United States	Argentina	1–0	1–0	2021 SheBelieves Cup

== Honours ==
=== Individual ===
- CONCACAF Girls' Under-15 Championship Golden Ball: 2014
- CONCACAF Girls' Under-15 Championship Best XI: 2014
