= Shayla Smart =

Jamaican footballer (born 2000)

Personal information
- Full name: Shayla Brianna Smart
- Date of birth: 30 May 2000 (age 26)
- Place of birth: Bronx, New York, United States
- Height: 1.57 m (5 ft 2 in)
- Position: Forward

Team information
- Current team: Wake Forest Demon Deacons
- Number: 20

Youth career
- Montverde Academy

College career
Years	Team	Apps	(Gls)
2018–2021	Wake Forest Demon Deacons	2	(0)

Senior career*
Years	Team	Apps	(Gls)
2018	Florida Krush	1	(3)

International career^{‡}
2016	Jamaica U17	1+	(1)
2018	Jamaica U20	2	(0)
2019–	Jamaica	1	(0)
- * Club domestic league appearances and goals as of 17 June 2018 ‡ National team caps and goals as of 28 July 2019

Shayla Brianna Smart (born 30 May 2000) is an American-born Jamaican footballer who played as a forward for Wake Forest Demon Deacons and currently plays for the Jamaica women's national team.

== Early life and education ==
Smart was born to a Jamaican father and a Puerto Rican mother. She attended the Wake Forest University in Winston-Salem, North Carolina.

== International career ==
Smart has represented Jamaica on the senior national team as well as the under-17 and under-20 national teams. She competed at the 2016 CONCACAF Women's U-17 Championship and the 2018 CONCACAF Women's U-20 Championship. She made her senior debut on 28 July 2019 against Mexico in the Pan American Games.
