= Didra Martínez =

Guatemalan footballer

Personal information
- Full name: Didra Darleny Martínez Moreira
- Date of birth: 25 November 1999 (age 26)
- Place of birth: Escuintla, Guatemala
- Position: Defender

Team information
- Current team: Deportivo Xela

Senior career*
Years	Team	Apps	(Gls)
2014–	Deportivo Xela		

International career^{‡}
2019–	Guatemala	2	(0)
- * Club domestic league appearances and goals ‡ National team caps and goals as of 8 October 2019

Didra Darleny Martínez Moreira (born 25 November 1999) is a Guatemalan footballer who plays as a defender for Deportivo Xela and the Guatemala women's national team.

Born and raised in Escuintla, Guatemala, Martínez joined Deportivo Xela at the age of 14.
