= Frankie Tagliaferri =

American soccer player (born 1999)

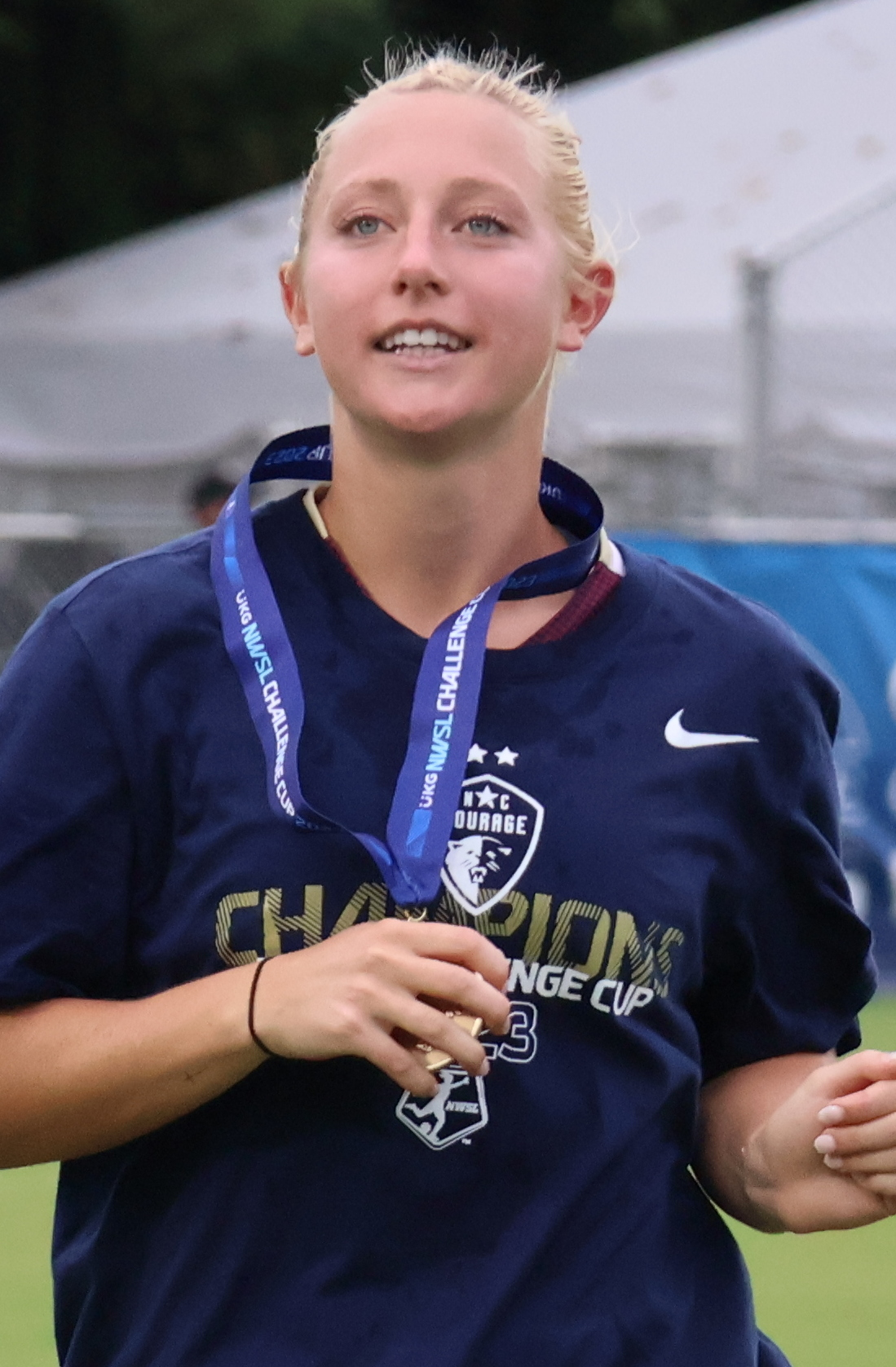
- Tagliaferri with the North Carolina Courage in 2023

Personal information
- Full name: Francesca Claire Tagliaferri
- Date of birth: January 18, 1999 (age 27)
- Place of birth: Red Bank, New Jersey, United States
- Height: 5 ft 6 in (1.68 m)
- Position: Midfielder

Youth career
- Colts Neck High School

College career
Years	Team	Apps	(Gls)
2017–2021	Penn State Nittany Lions	90	(27)
2021	Rutgers Scarlet Knights	25	(13)

Senior career*
Years	Team	Apps	(Gls)
2022–2023	North Carolina Courage	13	(0)
2024	Utah Royals	6	(0)

International career^{‡}
2013–2016	United States U17	24	(11)
- * Club domestic league appearances and goals as of 11 October 2024 ‡ National team caps and goals as of 29 Nov 2023

Francesca Claire Tagliaferri (born January 18, 1999) is an American former professional soccer player who played as a midfielder in the National Women's Soccer League (NWSL) for three seasons. She played college soccer for the Penn State Nittany Lions and the Rutgers Scarlet Knights, earning first-team All-American honors and setting the NCAA Division I record for career appearances. She played for the North Carolina Courage and the Utah Royals in the NWSL.

== College career ==
Tagliaferri played her first three years of NCAA Division I soccer at Penn State, scoring 22 goals overall and earning second-team All-America honors in her last season. In her overall final season of Division I soccer at Rutgers, she scored 13 goals and registered 9 assists, earning her All-America First Team honors and being named 2021 Big Ten Midfielder of the Year. By the end of her college career, she had played in an NCAA Division I record 115 games, breaking the pre-coronavirus pandemic record held by Kristi Eveland.

== Club career ==
=== North Carolina Courage ===
Tagliaferri was signed by the North Carolina Courage of the NWSL prior to the 2022 season. She made her first professional start on June 30 against OL Reign.

=== Utah Royals ===
On November 23, 2023, Utah Royals announced that Tagliaferri had been acquired by the club ahead of their return to the NWSL for the 2024 season.

On October 10, 2024, Utah Royals announced that they had parted ways with Tagliaferri.

== International career ==
Tagliaferri received call-ups to the United States under-17 Women's National Team for both the 2013 CONCACAF Women's U-17 Championship and the 2016 FIFA U-17 Women's World Cup, scoring twice during the latter tournament.
