= Valeria del Campo =

Costa Rican footballer (born 2000)

Personal information
- Full name: Valeria del Campo Gutiérrez
- Date of birth: 15 February 2000 (age 26)
- Place of birth: Alajuela, Costa Rica
- Height: 1.63 m (5 ft 4 in)
- Position: Centre-back

Team information
- Current team: Monterrey
- Number: 23

Senior career*
Years	Team	Apps	(Gls)
- Saprissa
2021–	Monterrey	91	(2)

International career^{‡}
2019–	Costa Rica	11	(0)
Medal record
Women's football
Representing Costa Rica
Pan American Games
Bronze medal – third place	2019 Lima	Team
- * Club domestic league appearances and goals ‡ National team caps and goals as of 23 July 2023

Valeria del Campo Gutiérrez (Note: In this Spanish name, the first or paternal surname is del Campo and the second or maternal family name is Gutiérrez.) (born 15 February 2000) is a Costa Rican footballer who plays as a centre back for Mexican Liga MX Femenil club C.F. Monterrey and the Costa Rica women's national team.

Del Campo helped C.F. Monterrey to win the 2021–22 Apertura title. With this she became the first Costa Rican player to be a member of a Liga MX Femenil championship team.

== International career ==
Del Campo made her senior debut for Costa Rica on 3 August 2019 against Argentina in the 2019 Pan American Games.
