= Yuvitza Mayén =

Guatemalan footballer

Personal information
- Full name: Kellin Yuvitza Mayén Hernández
- Date of birth: 26 July 1999 (age 27)
- Place of birth: Guatemala
- Position: Defender

Team information
- Current team: Unifut

Senior career*
Years	Team	Apps	(Gls)
- Guastatoya
- Unifut

International career^{‡}
2014–	Guatemala	3	(1)
- * Club domestic league appearances and goals ‡ National team caps and goals as of 8 October 2019

Kellin Yuvitza Mayén Hernández (born 26 July 1999), known as Yuvitza Mayén, is a Guatemalan footballer who plays as a defender for Unifut Rosal and the Guatemala women's national team.

Mayén hails from San Antonio El Teocinte, Santa Cruz Naranjo.
