= Nérilia Mondésir =

Haitian footballer (born 1999)

- Mondésir with the Seattle Reign in 2026

Personal information
- Date of birth: 17 January 1999 (age 27)
- Place of birth: Quartier-Morin, Haiti
- Height: 1.63 m (5 ft 4 in)
- Position: Forward

Team information
- Current team: Seattle Reign
- Number: 30

Senior career*
| Years | Team | Apps | (Gls) |
| 2017–2024 | Montpellier | 123 | (20) |
| 2024– | Seattle Reign | 58 | (5) |

International career^{‡}
| 2014 | Haiti U15 | 6 | (11) |
| 2013–2016 | Haiti U17 | 5 | (9) |
| 2015–2018 | Haiti U20 | 10 | (9) |
| 2015– | Haiti | 37 | (37) |
- * Club domestic league appearances and goals as of 16:37, 8 November 2026 (UTC) ‡ National team caps and goals as of 30 November 2025

Nérilia Mondésir (born 17 January 1999), nicknamed "Nérigol" and "Coco", is a Haitian professional footballer who plays as a forward for National Women's Soccer League club Seattle Reign and the Haiti national team. She previously had an eight-season stint in the Première Ligue with Montpellier.

== Club career ==
Mondésir started her career with AS Tigresses in her native Haiti. Playing for Division 1 Féminine side Montpellier HSC from 2017 to 2024, Mondésir made a total of 123 appearances and was the club's top goalscorer in 2022 with nine goals.

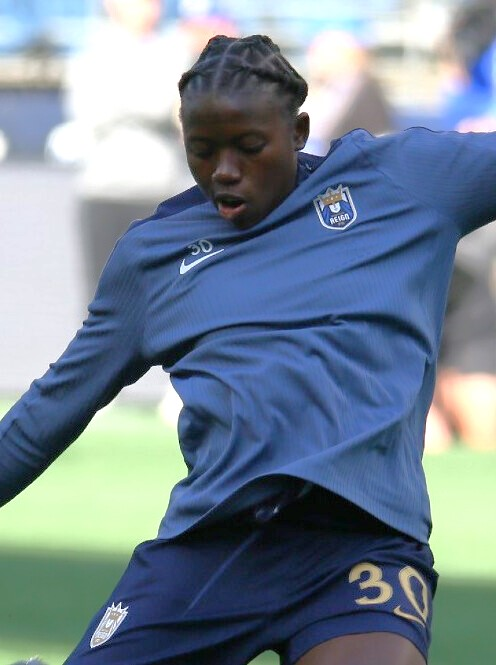
Mondésir with the Reign in 2025

On 29 July 2024, Mondésir signed for NWSL club Seattle Reign, becoming the first Haitian-born player in the league's history. She became the first Haitian-born player to score in the NWSL on 18 October 2024, as she scored the winning goal in the Reign's 2–1 win over Houston Dash, ending a 5-game losing streak. In February 2026, the Reign exercised the mutual option in Mondésir's contract to extend her time with the club through the 2027 season. She scored the only goal in Seattle's 1–0 win over Angel City FC on 21 February in the 2026 Coachella Valley Invitational at Empire Polo Club. She provided two assists in the Reign's 2–1 win against Orlando Pride on 15 March 2026, the club's opening game of the 2026 season.

== Honours ==
Individual

- CONCACAF Women's U-17 Championship Golden Boot: 2016
- CONCACAF Women's U-17 Championship Best XI: 2016

== International ==
As of match played 30 November 2025

Appearances and goals by national team and year
| National team | Year | Apps | Goals |
|---|---|---|---|
| Haiti | 2015 | 5 | 12 |
| Haiti | 2016 | 0 | 0 |
| Haiti | 2017 | 0 | 0 |
| Haiti | 2018 | 0 | 0 |
| Haiti | 2019 | 2 | 4 |
| Haiti | 2020 | 3 | 2 |
| Haiti | 2021 | 0 | 0 |
| Haiti | 2022 | 9 | 4 |
| Haiti | 2023 | 12 | 9 |
| Haiti | 2024 | 3 | 1 |
| Haiti | 2025 | 3 | 5 |
| Total | | 37 | 37 |

Scores and results list Haiti's goal tally first

| No. | Date | Venue | Opponent | Score | Result | Competition |
|---|---|---|---|---|---|---|
| 1 | 21 August 2015 | Juan Ramón Loubriel Stadium, Bayamón, Puerto Rico | Aruba | 5–0 | 14–0 | 2016 CONCACAF Women's Olympic Qualifying Championship qualification |
| 2 | 21 August 2015 | Juan Ramón Loubriel Stadium, Bayamón, Puerto Rico | Aruba | 7–0 | 14–0 | 2016 CONCACAF Women's Olympic Qualifying Championship qualification |
| 3 | 21 August 2015 | Juan Ramón Loubriel Stadium, Bayamón, Puerto Rico | Aruba | 8–0 | 14–0 | 2016 CONCACAF Women's Olympic Qualifying Championship qualification |
| 4 | 21 August 2015 | Juan Ramón Loubriel Stadium, Bayamón, Puerto Rico | Aruba | 9–0 | 14–0 | 2016 CONCACAF Women's Olympic Qualifying Championship qualification |
| 5 | 21 August 2015 | Juan Ramón Loubriel Stadium, Bayamón, Puerto Rico | Aruba | 10–0 | 14–0 | 2016 CONCACAF Women's Olympic Qualifying Championship qualification |
| 6 | 21 August 2015 | Juan Ramón Loubriel Stadium, Bayamón, Puerto Rico | Aruba | 14–0 | 14–0 | 2016 CONCACAF Women's Olympic Qualifying Championship qualification |
| 7 | 23 August 2015 | Juan Ramón Loubriel Stadium, Bayamón, Puerto Rico | Grenada | 4–0 | 13–0 | 2016 CONCACAF Women's Olympic Qualifying Championship qualification |
| 8 | 23 August 2015 | Juan Ramón Loubriel Stadium, Bayamón, Puerto Rico | Grenada | 5–0 | 13–0 | 2016 CONCACAF Women's Olympic Qualifying Championship qualification |
| 9 | 23 August 2015 | Juan Ramón Loubriel Stadium, Bayamón, Puerto Rico | Grenada | 6–0 | 13–0 | 2016 CONCACAF Women's Olympic Qualifying Championship qualification |
| 10 | 23 August 2015 | Juan Ramón Loubriel Stadium, Bayamón, Puerto Rico | Grenada | 7–0 | 13–0 | 2016 CONCACAF Women's Olympic Qualifying Championship qualification |
| 11 | 23 August 2015 | Juan Ramón Loubriel Stadium, Bayamón, Puerto Rico | Grenada | 11–0 | 13–0 | 2016 CONCACAF Women's Olympic Qualifying Championship qualification |
| 12 | 25 August 2015 | Juan Ramón Loubriel Stadium, Bayamón, Puerto Rico | Puerto Rico | 2–3 | 2–3 | 2016 CONCACAF Women's Olympic Qualifying Championship qualification |
| 13 | 3 October 2019 | Juan Ramón Loubriel Stadium, Bayamón, Puerto Rico | Suriname | 1–0 | 10–0 | 2020 CONCACAF Women's Olympic Qualifying Championship qualification |
| 14 | 3 October 2019 | Juan Ramón Loubriel Stadium, Bayamón, Puerto Rico | Suriname | 4–0 | 10–0 | 2020 CONCACAF Women's Olympic Qualifying Championship qualification |
| 15 | 3 October 2019 | Juan Ramón Loubriel Stadium, Bayamón, Puerto Rico | Suriname | 6–0 | 10–0 | 2020 CONCACAF Women's Olympic Qualifying Championship qualification |
| 16 | 3 October 2019 | Juan Ramón Loubriel Stadium, Bayamón, Puerto Rico | Suriname | 7–0 | 10–0 | 2020 CONCACAF Women's Olympic Qualifying Championship qualification |
| 17 | 3 February 2020 | BBVA Stadium, Houston, United States | Panama | 1–0 | 6–0 | 2020 CONCACAF Women's Olympic Qualifying Championship |
| 18 | 3 February 2020 | BBVA Stadium, Houston, United States | Panama | 6–0 | 6–0 | 2020 CONCACAF Women's Olympic Qualifying Championship |
| 19 | 9 April 2022 | A. O. Shirley Recreation Ground, Road Town, British Virgin Islands | British Virgin Islands | 12–0 | 21–0 | 2022 CONCACAF W Championship qualification |
| 20 | 12 April 2022 | Estadio Olímpico Félix Sánchez, Santo Domingo, Dominican Republic | Cuba | 1–0 | 6–0 | 2022 CONCACAF W Championship qualification |
| 21 | 28 June 2022 | Sports Complex Fedefutbol-Plycem, San Rafael, Costa Rica | Costa Rica | 2–0 | 4–2 | Friendly |
| 22 | 7 July 2022 | Estadio BBVA, Guadalupe, Mexico | Mexico | 2–0 | 3–0 | 2022 CONCACAF W Championship |
| 23 | 18 February 2023 | North Harbour Stadium, Auckland, New Zealand | Senegal | 2–0 | 4–0 | 2023 FIFA Women's World Cup qualification |
| 24 | 1 July 2023 | Stade d'Octodure, Martigny, Switzerland | Malta | 4–0 | 5–0 | Friendly |
| 25 | 8 July 2023 | Seoul World Cup Stadium, Seoul, South Korea | South Korea | 1–0 | 1–2 | Friendly |
| 26 | 21 September 2023 | Estadio Olímpico Félix Sánchez, Santo Domingo, Dominican Republic | Costa Rica | 1–0 | 1–0 | 2024 CONCACAF W Gold Cup qualification |
| 27 | 26 October 2023 | SKNFA Technical Center, Basseterre, St. Kitts and Nevis | Saint Kitts and Nevis | 2–0 | 11–0 | 2024 CONCACAF W Gold Cup qualification |
| 28 | 26 October 2023 | SKNFA Technical Center, Basseterre, St. Kitts and Nevis | Saint Kitts and Nevis | 7–0 | 11–0 | 2024 CONCACAF W Gold Cup qualification |
| 29 | 26 October 2023 | SKNFA Technical Center, Basseterre, St. Kitts and Nevis | Saint Kitts and Nevis | 10–0 | 11–0 | 2024 CONCACAF W Gold Cup qualification |
| 30 | 30 October 2023 | SKNFA Technical Center, Basseterre, St. Kitts and Nevis | Saint Kitts and Nevis | 12–0 | 13–0 | 2024 CONCACAF W Gold Cup qualification |
| 31 | 30 November 2023 | Estadio Alejandro Morera Soto, Alajuela, Costa Rica | Costa Rica | 1–1 | 1–1 | 2024 CONCACAF W Gold Cup qualification |
| 32 | 26 October 2024 | Emirhan Sports Complex, Antalya, Turkey | Chinese Taipei | 2–2 | 3–2 | 2024 Pink Ladies Cup |
| 33 | 25 February 2025 | Père Jégo Stadium, Casablanca, Morocco | Morocco | 1–0 | 1–1 | Friendly |
| 34 | 30 November 2025 | FFB Stadium, Belmopan, Belize | Belize | 1–0 | 9–0 | 2026 CONCACAF W Championship qualification |
| 35 | 30 November 2025 | FFB Stadium, Belmopan, Belize | Belize | 3–0 | 9–0 | 2026 CONCACAF W Championship qualification |
| 36 | 30 November 2025 | FFB Stadium, Belmopan, Belize | Belize | 4–0 | 9–0 | 2026 CONCACAF W Championship qualification |
| 37 | 30 November 2025 | FFB Stadium, Belmopan, Belize | Belize | 7–0 | 9–0 | 2026 CONCACAF W Championship qualification |
| 38 | 5 June 2026 | Nuevo Estadio El Maulí, Málaga, Spain | New Zealand | 1–1 | 2–1 | Friendly |
