= 2024 CONCACAF W Gold Cup squads =

List of squads from the 2024 CONCACAF W Gold Cup

Each team had to submit a final squad of 23 players for 2024 CONCACAF W Gold Cup, three of whom had to be goalkeepers. The rosters were confirmed by CONCACAF on 12 February 2024.

The age listed for each player is their age as of 20 February 2024, the first day of the tournament. The numbers of caps and goals listed for each player do not include any matches played after the start of the tournament. The club listed is the club for which the player last played a competitive match prior to the tournament. The nationality for each club reflects the national association (not the league) to which the club is affiliated. A flag is included for coaches who are of a different nationality to their team.

== Group A ==
=== Argentina ===
Head coach: Germán Portanova

The 22-player roster was announced on 9 February 2024. A week later, Lorena Benítez withdrew and was replaced by Marianela Szymanowski.

No.	Pos.	Player	Date of birth (age)	Caps	Goals	Club
1	GK	Vanina Correa	14 August 1983 (aged 40)	66	0	(Argentine Football Association) Rosario Central
2	DF	Adriana Sachs	25 December 1993 (aged 30)	41	0	(Argentine Football Association) Racing
3	DF	Eliana Stábile	26 November 1993 (aged 30)	61	6	(Argentine Football Association) Boca Juniors
4	DF	Julieta Cruz	4 June 1996 (aged 27)	19	1	(Argentine Football Association) Boca Juniors
5	MF	Vanina Preininger	26 September 1996 (aged 27)	5	0	(Argentine Football Association) Boca Juniors
6	DF	Aldana Cometti (vice-captain)	3 March 1996 (aged 27)	79	8	(Royal Spanish Football Federation) Madrid CFF
7	MF	Romina Núñez	1 January 1994 (aged 30)	36	1	(Royal Spanish Football Federation) Real Betis
8	MF	Daiana Falfán	14 October 2000 (aged 23)	38	0	(Royal Spanish Football Federation) Granada
9	FW	Estefanía Palomar	7 January 2003 (aged 21)	5	0	(Argentine Football Association) Boca Juniors
10	MF	Dalila Ippólito	24 March 2002 (aged 21)	22	0	(Italian Football Federation) Pomigliano
11	FW	Yamila Rodríguez	24 January 1998 (aged 26)	40	10	(Brazilian Football Confederation) Palmeiras
12	GK	Laurina Oliveros	10 September 1993 (aged 30)	15	0	(Argentine Football Association) Boca Juniors
13	DF	Sophia Braun	26 January 2000 (aged 24)	26	2	(United States Soccer Federation) Kansas City Current
14	MF	Miriam Mayorga (captain)	20 November 1989 (aged 34)	47	0	(Argentine Football Association) Boca Juniors
15	MF	Maricel Pereyra	11 May 2002 (aged 21)	12	0	(Argentine Football Association) San Lorenzo
16	FW	Marianela Szymanowski	31 July 1990 (aged 33)	6	0	(Italian Football Federation) Pomigliano
17	MF	Camila Gómez Ares	26 October 1994 (aged 29)	13	1	(Argentine Football Association) Boca Juniors
18	DF	Celeste Dos Santos	4 November 2003 (aged 20)	1	0	(Argentine Football Association) Boca Juniors
19	FW	Mariana Larroquette	24 October 1992 (aged 31)	79	22	(United States Soccer Federation) Orlando Pride
20	FW	Chiara Singarella	5 December 2003 (aged 20)	6	1	(United States Soccer Federation) South Alabama Jaguars
21	DF	Catalina Roggerone	3 April 2003 (aged 20)	2	0	(United States Soccer Federation) CSUB Roadrunners
22	FW	Nina Nicosia	2 February 2003 (aged 21)	0	0	(Mexican Football Federation) Pachuca

=== Dominican Republic ===
Head coach: (Colombia) Henry Parra

No.	Pos.	Player	Date of birth (age)	Caps	Goals	Club
1	GK	Odaliana Gómez	19 June 2004 (aged 19)	6	0	(United States Soccer Federation) FIU Panthers
2	DF	Alexa Pacheco	6 November 2002 (aged 21)	5	0	(United States Soccer Federation) Goldey–Beacom Lightning
3	DF	Stella Tapia	15 February 2005 (aged 19)	0	0	(United States Soccer Federation) Michigan Wolverines
4	DF	Giovanna Dionicio	20 September 2001 (aged 22)	10	1	Unattached
5	DF	Nadia Colón	8 September 2002 (aged 21)	10	0	(United States Soccer Federation) UT Rio Grande Valley Vaqueros
6	FW	Yomerci Brito	11 August 2001 (aged 22)	0	0	(Dominican Football Federation) 5 de Abril
7	MF	Winibian Peralta	19 August 1997 (aged 26)	20	2	(Costa Rican Football Federation) Puerto Viejo
8	FW	Dahien Cabrera	15 August 2000 (aged 23)	2	1	(United States Soccer Federation) Edward Waters Tigers
9	FW	Mía Asenjo	7 March 2003 (aged 20)	4	4	(United States Soccer Federation) UCF Knights
10	FW	Vanessa Kara	27 November 1996 (aged 27)	10	5	Unattached
11	FW	Alyssa Oviedo	18 August 2000 (aged 23)	11	7	Unattached
12	GK	Carolina Moreno	3 December 2001 (aged 22)	1	0	(Dominican Football Federation) Cibao
13	MF	Keisla Gil	12 July 2003 (aged 20)	4	0	(United States Soccer Federation) Central Methodist Eagles
14	MF	Lucía León (captain)	14 August 1997 (aged 26)	12	4	(The Football Association) Watford
15	MF	Kat González	12 July 2000 (aged 23)	6	4	(Danish Football Association) Thisted
16	DF	Renata Mercedes	22 October 2007 (aged 16)	2	0	(United States Soccer Federation) Taft Rhinos
17	FW	Jazmin Jackson	24 November 2004 (aged 19)	4	4	(United States Soccer Federation) VCU Rams
18	DF	Claudia Alcántara	28 November 1999 (aged 24)	3	0	(Dominican Football Federation) Fundación Eagles
19	DF	Gabriella Cuevas	15 August 1993 (aged 30)	14	2	Unattached
20	GK	Paloma Peña	20 February 2005 (aged 19)	1	0	(United States Soccer Federation) Florida Gators
21	MF	Jaylen Vallecillo	23 April 2006 (aged 17)	6	1	(United States Soccer Federation) East Meadow SC
22	DF	Brianne Reed	2 May 1994 (aged 29)	14	1	(Portuguese Football Federation) Damaiense
23	FW	Angelina Vargas	6 July 2005 (aged 18)	2	1	(United States Soccer Federation) Brown Bears

=== Mexico ===
Head coach: (Spain) Pedro López

The 23-player roster was announced on 10 February 2024. The following week, Scarlett Camberos withdrew from the squad due to injury and was replaced by Mayra Pelayo-Bernal. The following day, Cecilia Santiago withdrew due to injury and was replaced by Pamela Tajonar.

No.	Pos.	Player	Date of birth (age)	Caps	Goals	Club
1	GK	Pamela Tajonar	2 December 1984 (aged 39)	58	0	(Mexican Football Federation) Monterrey
2	DF	Nicolette Hernández	17 February 1999 (aged 25)	10	0	(Mexican Football Federation) América
3	DF	Karina Rodríguez	2 March 1999 (aged 24)	15	0	(Mexican Football Federation) América
4	DF	Rebeca Bernal (captain)	31 August 1997 (aged 26)	51	5	(Mexican Football Federation) Monterrey
5	DF	Karen Luna	12 February 1998 (aged 26)	0	0	(Mexican Football Federation) América
6	DF	Reyna Reyes	16 February 2001 (aged 23)	6	0	(United States Soccer Federation) Portland Thorns
7	MF	María Sánchez	20 February 1996 (aged 28)	52	14	(United States Soccer Federation) Houston Dash
8	MF	Alexia Delgado	9 December 1999 (aged 24)	36	2	(Mexican Football Federation) UANL
9	FW	Kiana Palacios	1 October 1996 (aged 27)	41	11	(Mexican Football Federation) América
10	MF	Stephany Mayor	23 September 1991 (aged 32)	109	27	(Mexican Football Federation) UANL
11	MF	Jacqueline Ovalle	19 October 1999 (aged 24)	45	14	(Mexican Football Federation) UANL
12	GK	Itzel González	14 August 1994 (aged 29)	20	0	(Mexican Football Federation) América
13	DF	Araceli Torres	23 December 2000 (aged 23)	7	0	(Mexican Football Federation) Guadalajara
14	DF	Greta Espinoza	5 June 1995 (aged 28)	46	5	(Mexican Football Federation) UANL
15	DF	Cristina Ferral	16 February 1993 (aged 31)	41	2	(Mexican Football Federation) UANL
16	MF	Karla Nieto	9 January 1995 (aged 29)	43	1	(Mexican Football Federation) Pachuca
17	MF	Natalia Mauleón	4 February 2002 (aged 22)	10	2	(Mexican Football Federation) América
18	MF	Jasmine Casarez	7 January 1997 (aged 27)	6	4	(Mexican Football Federation) Juárez
19	FW	Charlyn Corral	11 September 1991 (aged 32)	70	35	(Mexican Football Federation) Pachuca
20	MF	Mayra Pelayo-Bernal	29 January 1997 (aged 27)	4	0	(Mexican Football Federation) Tijuana
21	GK	Esthefanny Barreras	2 November 1996 (aged 27)	9	0	(Mexican Football Federation) Pachuca
22	FW	Diana Ordóñez	26 September 2001 (aged 22)	18	9	(United States Soccer Federation) Houston Dash
23	DF	Kimberly Rodríguez	26 March 1999 (aged 24)	17	1	(Mexican Football Federation) América

=== United States ===
The 23-player roster was announced on 7 February 2024. On 13 February, Alana Cook withdrew due to a knee injury and was replaced by Becky Sauerbrunn. On 20 February, Mia Fishel withdrew from the squad due to an anterior cruciate ligament injury and was replaced by Alex Morgan.

Head coach: Twila Kilgore (interim)

No.	Pos.	Player	Date of birth (age)	Caps	Goals	Club
1	GK	Alyssa Naeher	20 April 1988 (aged 35)	97	0	(United States Soccer Federation) Chicago Red Stars
2	DF	Abby Dahlkemper	13 May 1993 (aged 30)	80	0	(United States Soccer Federation) San Diego Wave
3	DF	Jenna Nighswonger	28 November 2000 (aged 23)	2	0	(United States Soccer Federation) Gotham FC
4	DF	Naomi Girma	14 June 2000 (aged 23)	26	0	(United States Soccer Federation) San Diego Wave
5	DF	Becky Sauerbrunn	6 June 1985 (aged 38)	217	0	(United States Soccer Federation) Portland Thorns
6	FW	Lynn Williams	21 May 1993 (aged 30)	59	17	(United States Soccer Federation) Gotham FC
7	FW	Alex Morgan	2 July 1989 (aged 34)	215	121	(United States Soccer Federation) San Diego Wave
8	FW	Jaedyn Shaw	20 November 2004 (aged 19)	4	2	(United States Soccer Federation) San Diego Wave
9	FW	Midge Purce	18 September 1995 (aged 28)	26	4	(United States Soccer Federation) Gotham FC
10	MF	Lindsey Horan	26 May 1994 (aged 29)	139	31	(French Football Federation) Lyon
11	FW	Sophia Smith	10 August 2000 (aged 23)	38	15	(United States Soccer Federation) Portland Thorns
12	DF	Tierna Davidson	19 September 1998 (aged 25)	51	1	(United States Soccer Federation) Gotham FC
13	MF	Olivia Moultrie	17 September 2005 (aged 18)	2	0	(United States Soccer Federation) Portland Thorns
14	MF	Emily Sonnett	25 November 1993 (aged 30)	83	2	(United States Soccer Federation) Gotham FC
15	MF	Korbin Albert	13 October 2003 (aged 20)	1	0	(French Football Federation) Paris Saint-Germain
16	MF	Rose Lavelle	14 May 1995 (aged 28)	92	24	(United States Soccer Federation) Gotham FC
17	MF	Sam Coffey	31 December 1998 (aged 25)	7	1	(United States Soccer Federation) Portland Thorns
18	GK	Casey Murphy	25 April 1996 (aged 27)	17	0	(United States Soccer Federation) North Carolina Courage
19	DF	Crystal Dunn	3 July 1992 (aged 31)	140	24	(United States Soccer Federation) Gotham FC
20	DF	Casey Krueger	23 August 1990 (aged 33)	42	0	(United States Soccer Federation) Washington Spirit
21	GK	Jane Campbell	17 February 1995 (aged 29)	7	0	(United States Soccer Federation) Houston Dash
22	FW	Trinity Rodman	20 May 2002 (aged 21)	28	7	(United States Soccer Federation) Washington Spirit
23	DF	Emily Fox	5 July 1998 (aged 25)	39	1	(The Football Association) Arsenal

== Group B ==
=== Brazil ===
The 23-player roster was announced on 1 February 2024. On 14 February 2024, Letícia Izidoro withdrew from the squad due to an anterior cruciate ligament injury and was replaced by Gabi Barbieri.

Head coach: Arthur Elias

No.	Pos.	Player	Date of birth (age)	Caps	Goals	Club
1	GK	Luciana	24 July 1987 (aged 36)	39	0	(Brazilian Football Confederation) Ferroviária
2	DF	Antônia	26 April 1994 (aged 29)	31	0	(Royal Spanish Football Federation) Levante
3	DF	Tarciane	27 May 2003 (aged 20)	2	0	(Brazilian Football Confederation) Corinthians
4	DF	Rafaelle	18 June 1991 (aged 32)	88	8	(United States Soccer Federation) Orlando Pride
5	DF	Thaís	1 May 1996 (aged 27)	5	0	(Royal Spanish Football Federation) Tenerife
6	DF	Yasmim	28 October 1996 (aged 27)	5	1	(Brazilian Football Confederation) Corinthians
7	FW	Debinha	20 October 1991 (aged 32)	139	60	(United States Soccer Federation) Kansas City Current
8	MF	Ary Borges	28 December 1999 (aged 24)	33	8	(United States Soccer Federation) Racing Louisville
9	FW	Gabi Nunes	10 March 1997 (aged 26)	24	4	(Royal Spanish Football Federation) Levante
10	FW	Bia Zaneratto	17 December 1993 (aged 30)	115	38	(United States Soccer Federation) Kansas City Current
11	FW	Adriana	17 November 1996 (aged 27)	48	12	(United States Soccer Federation) Orlando Pride
12	GK	Gabi Barbieri	7 March 2003 (aged 20)	0	0	(Brazilian Football Confederation) Flamengo
13	DF	Bia Menezes	25 June 1997 (aged 26)	0	0	(Brazilian Football Confederation) São Paulo
14	DF	Lauren	13 September 2002 (aged 21)	15	0	(United States Soccer Federation) Kansas City Current
15	MF	Julia Bianchi	7 October 1997 (aged 26)	12	2	(United States Soccer Federation) Chicago Red Stars
16	MF	Vitória Yaya	23 January 2002 (aged 22)	1	0	(Brazilian Football Confederation) Corinthians
17	MF	Aline Milene	8 April 1998 (aged 25)	10	1	(Brazilian Football Confederation) São Paulo
18	FW	Gabi Portilho	18 July 1995 (aged 28)	11	0	(Brazilian Football Confederation) Corinthians
19	FW	Geyse	27 March 1998 (aged 25)	48	7	(The Football Association) Manchester United
20	MF	Duda Sampaio	18 May 2001 (aged 22)	13	2	(Brazilian Football Confederation) Corinthians
21	MF	Duda Santos	24 March 1996 (aged 27)	8	2	(Brazilian Football Confederation) Ferroviária
22	GK	Amanda Coimbra	15 June 2002 (aged 21)	0	0	(Brazilian Football Confederation) Fluminense
23	FW	Aline Gomes	7 July 2005 (aged 18)	1	0	(Brazilian Football Confederation) Ferroviária

=== Colombia ===
The 23-player roster was announced on 9 February 2024.

Head coach: Ángelo Marsiglia (interim)

No.	Pos.	Player	Date of birth (age)	Caps	Goals	Club
1	GK	Natalia Giraldo	19 May 2003 (aged 20)			(Colombian Football Federation) América de Cali
2	DF	Manuela Vanegas	9 November 2000 (aged 23)			(Royal Spanish Football Federation) Real Sociedad
3	DF	Daniela Arias	31 August 1994 (aged 29)			(Brazilian Football Confederation) Corinthians
4	DF	Fabiana Yantén	16 May 1999 (aged 24)			(Colombian Football Federation) América de Cali
5	MF	Lorena Bedoya	6 October 1997 (aged 26)			(Brazilian Football Confederation) Real Brasília
6	MF	Daniela Montoya	22 August 1990 (aged 33)			(Colombian Football Federation) Atlético Nacional
7	MF	María Camila Reyes	11 May 2002 (aged 21)			(Colombian Football Federation) Santa Fe
8	MF	Marcela Restrepo	10 November 1995 (aged 28)			(Colombian Football Federation) Atlético Nacional
9	MF	Ivonne Chacón	12 October 1997 (aged 26)			(Royal Spanish Football Federation) Valencia
10	FW	Diana Celis	13 February 1993 (aged 31)			(Colombian Football Federation) Millonarios
11	FW	Catalina Usme	25 December 1989 (aged 34)			(Mexican Football Federation) Pachuca
12	GK	Sandra Sepúlveda	3 March 1988 (aged 35)			(Colombian Football Federation) Llaneros
13	MF	Ilana Izquierdo	14 June 2002 (aged 21)			(United States Soccer Federation) Mississippi State Bulldogs
14	DF	Ángela Barón	18 September 2003 (aged 20)			(Colombian Football Federation) Atlético Nacional
15	FW	Manuela Paví	23 December 2000 (aged 23)			(Colombian Football Federation) Deportivo Cali
16	MF	Lady Andrade	10 January 1992 (aged 32)			(Brazilian Football Confederation) Real Brasília
17	DF	Carolina Arias	2 September 1990 (aged 33)			(Colombian Football Federation) América de Cali
18	FW	Linda Caicedo	25 February 2005 (aged 18)			(Royal Spanish Football Federation) Real Madrid
19	DF	Jorelyn Carabalí	18 May 1997 (aged 26)			(The Football Association) Brighton & Hove Albion
20	DF	Mónica Ramos	14 October 1998 (aged 25)			(Brazilian Football Confederation) Grêmio
21	MF	Liana Salazar	16 September 1992 (aged 31)			(Colombian Football Federation) Millonarios
22	GK	Stefany Castaño	11 January 1994 (aged 30)			(Brazilian Football Confederation) Atlético Mineiro
23	FW	Elexa Bahr	26 May 1998 (aged 25)			(United States Soccer Federation) Racing Louisville

=== Panama ===
The 23-player roster was announced on 8 February 2024.

Head coach: (Mexico) Ignacio Quintana

No.	Pos.	Player	Date of birth (age)	Caps	Goals	Club
1	GK	Valeska Domínguez	13 June 1999 (aged 24)			(Panamanian Football Federation) Mario Méndez
2	DF	Hilary Jaén	29 August 2002 (aged 21)	15	0	(United States Soccer Federation) Jones County Bobcats
3	DF	Wendy Natis	19 August 2001 (aged 22)	8	0	(Brazilian Football Confederation) Bahia
4	DF	Katherine Castillo	23 March 1996 (aged 27)	16	1	(Panamanian Football Federation) Tauro
5	DF	Yomira Pinzón	23 August 1996 (aged 27)	19	3	(Panamanian Football Federation) Sporting San Miguelito
6	MF	Yamileth Palacio	22 August 2003 (aged 20)			(Panamanian Football Federation) Universitario
7	MF	Sherline King	3 March 2006 (aged 17)			(United States Soccer Federation) Santa Fe Saints
8	MF	Schiandra González	4 July 1995 (aged 28)	11	0	(Panamanian Football Federation) Tauro
9	FW	Katherine Parris	2 February 2003 (aged 21)			(United States Soccer Federation) Maryland Terrapins
10	MF	Marta Cox	20 July 1997 (aged 26)	19	9	(Mexican Football Federation) Tijuana
11	MF	Natalia Mills (captain)	22 March 1993 (aged 30)	12	0	(Costa Rican Football Federation) Alajuelense
12	GK	Yenith Bailey	29 March 2001 (aged 22)	13	0	(Panamanian Football Federation) Tauro
13	MF	Riley Tanner	15 October 1999 (aged 24)	9	3	(United States Soccer Federation) Washington Spirit
14	MF	Carmen Montenegro	5 December 2000 (aged 23)	3	0	(Panamanian Football Federation) Sporting San Miguelito
15	DF	Nicole Cargill	28 November 2004 (aged 19)			(United States Soccer Federation) Delaware Fightin' Blue Hens
16	DF	Rebeca Espinosa	5 July 1992 (aged 31)	9	0	(Panamanian Football Federation) Sporting San Miguelito
17	MF	Kenia Rangel	6 August 1995 (aged 28)			(Costa Rican Football Federation) Alajuelense
18	MF	Erika Hernández	17 March 1999 (aged 24)	1	0	(Panamanian Football Federation) Sporting San Miguelito
19	FW	Yarelis Palacio	22 August 2003 (aged 20)	0	0	(Panamanian Football Federation) Universitario
20	MF	Aldrith Quintero	1 January 2002 (aged 22)	7	1	(French Football Federation) Fleury
21	DF	Nicole De Obaldía	16 March 2000 (aged 23)	7	0	(Costa Rican Football Federation) Pérez Zeledón
22	GK	Farissa Córdoba	30 June 1989 (aged 34)	4	0	(Peruvian Football Federation) Sporting Cristal
23	DF	Carina Baltrip-Reyes	1 July 1998 (aged 25)	11	1	(Italian Football Federation) Lazio

=== Puerto Rico ===
Head coach: (United States) Nat González

No.	Pos.	Player	Date of birth (age)	Caps	Goals	Club
1	GK	JLo Varada	2 February 2003 (aged 21)	4	0	(United States Soccer Federation) Campbell Fighting Camels
2	DF	Verónica García	23 December 1999 (aged 24)	3	0	(Puerto Rican Football Federation) Interamerican University
3	MF	Jailene de Jesus	10 May 2003 (aged 20)	3	2	(United States Soccer Federation) St. John's Red Storm
4	DF	Bryana Pizarro	29 August 2002 (aged 21)	0	0	(United States Soccer Federation) Washington State Cougars
5	DF	Madison Cox	24 October 1995 (aged 28)	6	1	(Cyprus Football Association) Lefkothea
6	DF	Jazmine Méndez	22 July 2003 (aged 20)	3	0	(United States Soccer Federation) UC Riverside Highlanders
7	FW	Daphane Méndez	22 July 2003 (aged 20)	7	0	(United States Soccer Federation) UC Riverside Highlanders
8	MF	Skylynn Rodríguez	16 August 2002 (aged 21)	0	0	(Mexican Football Federation) Cruz Azul
9	FW	Gloria Douglas	4 May 1992 (aged 31)	0	0	
10	MF	Nickolette Driesse	8 November 1994 (aged 29)	6	1	(United States Soccer Federation) Paisley Athletic
11	FW	Cristina Torres	October 3, 2000 (aged 23)	7	2	(Mexican Football Federation) Mazatlán
12	GK	Sydney Martinez	12 September 1999 (aged 24)	2	0	(Norwegian Football Federation) Grand Bodø
13	DF	Isabel Martínez	20 July 2002 (aged 21)	0	0	(United States Soccer Federation) Nova Southeastern Sharks
14	MF	Jill Aguilera	5 January 1998 (aged 26)	5	2	(United States Soccer Federation) Chicago Red Stars
15	MF	Ashley McMahon	18 June 2006 (aged 17)	0	0	(United States Soccer Federation) World Class FC
16	DF	Amber DiOrio	21 October 1999 (aged 24)	0	0	(Mexican Football Federation) UNAM
17	FW	Juelle Love	18 August 1999 (aged 24)	3	0	(Mexican Football Federation) Santos Laguna
18	MF	Josephine Cotto	15 January 2000 (aged 24)	5	0	(United States Soccer Federation) F.A. Euro
19	MF	Danielle Marcano	20 August 1997 (aged 26)	0	0	(Turkish Football Federation) Fomget Gençlik ve Spor
20	DF	Imani Morlock	14 June 1997 (aged 26)	2	0	(Israel Football Association) Bnot Netanya
21	MF	Sarah Martinez	3 April 2007 (aged 16)	0	0	(United States Soccer Federation) NC Courage (ECNL)
22	FW	Kennedy Garcia	16 February 2005 (aged 19)	0	0	(United States Soccer Federation) Alabama Crimson Tide
23	GK	Ariana Anderson	13 January 2005 (aged 19)	0	0	(United States Soccer Federation) Georgia State Panthers

== Group C ==
=== Canada ===
The 23-player roster was named on 7 February 2024. The following week, Jayde Riviere withdrew from the squad due to injury and was replaced by Marie-Yasmine Alidou.

Head coach: (England) Bev Priestman

No.	Pos.	Player	Date of birth (age)	Caps	Goals	Club
1	GK	Kailen Sheridan	16 July 1995 (aged 28)	43	0	(United States Soccer Federation) San Diego Wave
2	DF	Sydney Collins	8 September 1999 (aged 24)	6	0	(United States Soccer Federation) North Carolina Courage
3	DF	Kadeisha Buchanan	5 November 1995 (aged 28)	140	4	(The Football Association) Chelsea
4	DF	Shelina Zadorsky	24 October 1992 (aged 31)	95	4	(The Football Association) West Ham United
5	MF	Quinn	11 August 1995 (aged 28)	96	6	(United States Soccer Federation) Seattle Reign
6	FW	Deanne Rose	3 March 1999 (aged 24)	77	11	(The Football Association) Leicester City
7	MF	Julia Grosso	29 August 2000 (aged 23)	57	3	(Italian Football Federation) Juventus
8	MF	Marie-Yasmine Alidou	28 April 1995 (aged 28)	1	0	(Portuguese Football Federation) Benfica
9	FW	Jordyn Huitema	8 May 2001 (aged 22)	73	18	(United States Soccer Federation) Seattle Reign
10	DF	Ashley Lawrence	11 June 1995 (aged 28)	126	8	(The Football Association) Chelsea
11	FW	Evelyne Viens	6 February 1997 (aged 27)	22	4	(Italian Football Federation) Roma
12	DF	Jade Rose	12 February 2003 (aged 21)	13	0	(United States Soccer Federation) Harvard Crimson
13	MF	Simi Awujo	23 September 2003 (aged 20)	9	1	(United States Soccer Federation) USC Trojans
14	DF	Vanessa Gilles	11 March 1996 (aged 27)	34	3	(French Football Federation) Lyon
15	FW	Nichelle Prince	19 February 1995 (aged 29)	96	16	(United States Soccer Federation) Kansas City Current
16	DF	Gabrielle Carle	12 October 1998 (aged 25)	38	1	(United States Soccer Federation) Washington Spirit
17	MF	Jessie Fleming	11 March 1998 (aged 25)	123	19	(United States Soccer Federation) Portland Thorns
18	GK	Sabrina D'Angelo	11 May 1993 (aged 30)	14	0	(The Football Association) Arsenal
19	FW	Adriana Leon	2 October 1992 (aged 31)	105	31	(The Football Association) Aston Villa
20	FW	Cloé Lacasse	7 July 1993 (aged 30)	28	3	(The Football Association) Arsenal
21	FW	Clarissa Larisey	2 July 1999 (aged 24)	6	1	(Swedish Football Association) BK Häcken
22	GK	Lysianne Proulx	17 April 1999 (aged 24)	0	0	(United States Soccer Federation) Bay FC
23	MF	Olivia Smith	5 August 2004 (aged 19)	4	0	(Portuguese Football Federation) Sporting CP

=== Costa Rica ===
The 23-player roster was named on 8 February 2024.

Head coach: (Spain) Benito Rubido

No.	Pos.	Player	Date of birth (age)	Caps	Goals	Club
1	GK	Noelia Bermúdez	20 September 1994 (aged 29)			(Costa Rican Football Federation) Alajuelense
2	DF	Gabriela Guillén	1 March 1992 (aged 31)			(Costa Rican Football Federation) Alajuelense
3	MF	Ashly González	31 December 2005 (aged 18)			(Costa Rican Football Federation) Sporting
4	DF	Mariana Benavides	26 December 1994 (aged 29)			Unattached
5	DF	Valeria del Campo	15 February 2000 (aged 24)			(Mexican Football Federation) Monterrey
6	MF	Emily Flores	19 November 2001 (aged 22)			(Costa Rican Football Federation) Sporting
7	FW	Melissa Herrera	10 October 1996 (aged 27)			(Mexican Football Federation) Tijuana
8	DF	Daniela Cruz	8 March 1991 (aged 32)			(Mexican Football Federation) Atlas
9	FW	María Paula Salas	12 July 2002 (aged 21)			(Mexican Football Federation) Atlas
10	MF	Gloriana Villalobos	20 August 1999 (aged 24)			(Costa Rican Football Federation) Deportivo Saprissa
11	MF	Raquel Rodríguez	28 October 1993 (aged 30)			(United States Soccer Federation) Angel City
12	DF	María Elizondo	30 November 1998 (aged 25)			(Costa Rican Football Federation) Deportivo Saprissa
13	MF	Emilie Valenciano	15 February 1997 (aged 27)			(Costa Rican Football Federation) Alajuelense
14	MF	Priscila Chinchilla	11 July 2001 (aged 22)			Unattached
15	DF	Stephannie Blanco	13 December 2000 (aged 23)			(Costa Rican Football Federation) Alajuelense
16	FW	Hillary Corrales	4 December 1999 (aged 24)			(Costa Rican Football Federation) Sporting
17	MF	Alexa Herrera	16 November 2004 (aged 19)			(Costa Rican Football Federation) Alajuelense
18	GK	Dinnia Díaz	14 January 1988 (aged 36)			(Costa Rican Football Federation) Dimas Escazú
19	MF	Alexandra Pinell	18 October 2002 (aged 21)			(Costa Rican Football Federation) Alajuelense
20	DF	Fabiola Villalobos	13 March 1998 (aged 25)			(Costa Rican Football Federation) Alajuelense
21	MF	Sheika Scott	22 October 2006 (aged 17)			(Costa Rican Football Federation) Alajuelense
22	MF	Mariela Campos	4 January 1991 (aged 33)			(Costa Rican Football Federation) Alajuelense
23	GK	Daniela Solera	21 July 1997 (aged 26)			(Mexican Football Federation) Atlas

=== El Salvador ===
Head coach: Eric Acuña

No.	Pos.	Player	Date of birth (age)	Caps	Goals	Club
1	GK	Idalia Serrano	22 September 1999 (aged 24)	10	0	(United States Soccer Federation) Utah Valley Wolverines
2	DF	Juana Plata	7 February 2000 (aged 24)	9	0	(Mexican Football Federation) Monterrey
3	DF	Priscila Ortiz (captain)	7 March 1996 (aged 27)	14	0	(Salvadoran Football Federation) Alianza
4	DF	Elaily Hernández	27 May 2000 (aged 23)	10	0	(United States Soccer Federation) Premier Women
5	DF	Andrea Amaya	16 February 2003 (aged 21)	11	0	(Salvadoran Football Federation) Alianza
6	MF	Alejandra Morales	23 August 1990 (aged 33)			(United States Soccer Federation) Premier Women
7	MF	Danielle Fuentes	23 August 2000 (aged 23)	7	0	(Mexican Football Federation) Necaxa
8	MF	Victoria Meza	22 January 2005 (aged 19)			(United States Soccer Federation) Texas State Bobcats
9	MF	Makenna Dominguez	19 June 2003 (aged 20)			(United States Soccer Federation) North Carolina Tar Heels
10	FW	Brenda Cerén	24 September 1998 (aged 25)	15	8	(Mexican Football Federation) Atlas
11	MF	Samantha Fisher	26 August 1999 (aged 24)	1	0	(United States Soccer Federation) Chicago Red Stars
12	MF	Amber Marinero	6 June 1998 (aged 25)	2	0	(United States Soccer Federation) Premier Women
13	DF	Linda Guillen	28 June 2004 (aged 19)			(Salvadoran Football Federation) Alianza
14	FW	Karen Reyes	12 February 1998 (aged 26)	9	3	(Mexican Football Federation) Necaxa
15	MF	Danya Gutiérrez	12 February 2000 (aged 24)	5	3	(United States Soccer Federation) Premier Women
16	DF	Vasthy Delgado	26 May 1994 (aged 29)	2	0	(United States Soccer Federation) Virginia Marauders FC
17	MF	Irma Hernández	17 June 2000 (aged 23)			(Salvadoran Football Federation) Alianza
18	GK	Samantha Valadez	22 December 2004 (aged 19)	0	0	(United States Soccer Federation) OLLU Saints
19	FW	Yoselyn López	16 March 2001 (aged 22)	1	0	(Nicaraguan Football Federation) Real Estelí
20	MF	Isabella Recinos	27 January 2003 (aged 21)	0	0	(United States Soccer Federation) UMass Minutewomen
21	GK	Ana Valenzuela	6 November 2001 (aged 22)			(Salvadoran Football Federation) Alianza
22	FW	Jackeline Velásquez	18 September 1995 (aged 28)	5	1	(Salvadoran Football Federation) Alianza
23	FW	Samaria Gómez	18 February 2002 (aged 22)	2	0	(Israel Football Association) Bnot Netanya

=== Paraguay ===
The 23-player roster was named on 7 February 2024.

Head coach: Antônio Carlos Bona

No.	Pos.	Player	Date of birth (age)	Caps	Goals	Club
1	GK	Cristina Recalde	29 March 1994 (aged 29)	9	0	(Royal Spanish Football Federation) Unión Viera
2	DF	Limpia Fretes	24 June 2000 (aged 23)	19	0	(Brazilian Football Confederation) Cruzeiro
3	DF	Camila Barbosa	18 February 2002 (aged 22)	0	0	(Paraguayan Football Association) Olimpia
4	DF	Daysy Bareiro	19 January 2001 (aged 23)	10	0	(Royal Spanish Football Federation) Unión Viera
5	DF	Verónica Riveros	23 April 1987 (aged 36)	12	0	Unattached
6	MF	Dulce Quintana	6 February 1989 (aged 35)			(Portuguese Football Federation) Racing Power
7	MF	Griselda Garay	11 December 1997 (aged 26)			(Paraguayan Football Association) Olimpia
8	MF	Rosa Miño	13 July 1999 (aged 24)			Unattached
9	FW	Lice Chamorro	22 December 1998 (aged 25)			(Royal Spanish Football Federation) Espanyol
10	FW	Jessica Martínez	14 June 1999 (aged 24)	16	7	(Royal Spanish Football Federation) Levante Las Planas
11	FW	Liz Peña	15 June 1995 (aged 28)	4	1	(Paraguayan Football Association) Olimpia
12	GK	Alicia Bobadilla	5 June 1994 (aged 29)			(Argentine Football Association) Racing Club
13	MF	Dahiana Bogarín	13 November 2000 (aged 23)	3	0	(Football Federation of Chile) Colo-Colo
14	DF	Tania Riso	26 January 1994 (aged 30)			(Portuguese Football Federation) Racing Power
15	MF	Fanny Godoy	21 January 1998 (aged 26)	20	0	(Royal Spanish Football Federation) Unión Viera
16	FW	Ramona Martínez	21 July 1996 (aged 27)	15	2	(Brazilian Football Confederation) Avaí
17	MF	Deisy Ojeda	3 March 2000 (aged 23)	4	0	(Mexican Football Federation) Querétaro
18	DF	Liz Barreto	4 November 2000 (aged 23)			(Paraguayan Football Association) Libertad/Limpeño
19	FW	Rebeca Fernández	1 December 1991 (aged 32)	8	2	(Football Federation of Chile) Universidad de Chile
20	DF	Paola Genes	14 June 1991 (aged 32)	3	0	(Paraguayan Football Association) Olimpia
21	DF	Fiorela Martínez	18 April 2002 (aged 21)	1	0	(Royal Spanish Football Federation) Extremadura
22	GK	Gloria Saleb	12 June 1991 (aged 32)	0	0	(Paraguayan Football Association) Olimpia
23	FW	Fátima Acosta	7 January 2005 (aged 19)			(Brazilian Football Confederation) São Paulo
