= 2022 CONCACAF W Championship Group B =

The 2022 CONCACAF W Championship Group B was one of the two groups in the group stage of the 2022 CONCACAF W Championship, held from 4–11 July 2022 in Mexico. The teams in this group were Canada, Costa Rica, Panama, and Trinidad and Tobago. The top two teams qualified for the knockout stage and the 2023 FIFA Women's World Cup, while the third-placed team qualified for the 2023 FIFA Women's World Cup repêchage.

== Teams ==
Draw position	Team	Pot	Federation	Method of qualification	Date of qualification	Finals appearance	Last appearance	Previous best performance	FIFA Rankings
B1	Canada	1	NAFU	FIFA Women's World Rankings	10 December 2020	10th	2018	Champions (1998, 2010)	6
B2	Costa Rica	2	UNCAF	Qualification Group B winner	12 April 2022	8th	2018	Runners-up (2014)	37
B3	Panama	3	UNCAF	Qualification Group D winner	12 April 2022	4th	2018	Fourth place (2018)	57
B4	Trinidad and Tobago	4	CFU	Qualification Group F winner	12 April 2022	11th	2018	Third place (1991)	76

== Standings ==
Pos	Team	Pld	W	D	L	GF	GA	GD	Pts	Qualification
1	Canada	3	3	0	0	9	0	+9	9	Qualification for Women's World Cup and advance to knockout stage
2	Costa Rica	3	2	0	1	7	2	+5	6	Qualification for Women's World Cup and advance to knockout stage
3	Panama	3	1	0	2	1	4	−3	3	Advance to inter-confederation play-offs
4	Trinidad and Tobago	3	0	0	3	0	11	−11	0	

Source: CONCACAF
Rules for classification: Tiebreakers

== Matches ==
All times are local, CDT (UTC−5).

=== Costa Rica vs Panama ===
5 July 2022
18:00

Costa Rica	3–0	Panama
R. Rodríguez 6'; Salas 24'; Alvarado 60' (pen.)	Report (FIFA); Report (CONCACAF)

Estadio BBVA, Guadalupe
Attendance: 4,327
Referee: Odette Hamilton (Jamaica)

Costa Rica

Team stats
Costa Rica	Statistic	Panama
10	Shots	7
5	Shots on target	3
57%	Possession	43%
359	Passes	285
70%	Pass accuracy	62%
11	Fouls	20
1	Yellow cards	2
0	Red cards	0
1	Offsides	2
4	Corners	0

Panama

Formation: 4–2–3–1
GK	23	Daniela Solera
RB	8	Daniela Cruz
CB	20	Fabiola Villalobos	(yellow card) 90+5'
CB	4	Mariana Benavides
LB	3	María Paula Coto
CM	16	Katherine Alvarado
DM	15	Cristín Granados
RW	7	Melissa Herrera	(substituted off) 61'
AM	11	Raquel Rodríguez	(substituted off) 78'
LW	14	Priscila Chinchilla	(substituted off) 67'
FW	19	María Paula Salas	(substituted off) 78'
Substitutions:
DF	2	Gabriela Guillén	(substituted in) 61'
MF	10	Shirley Cruz	(substituted in) 78'
DF	22	Emilie Valenciano	(substituted in) 67'
FW	17	Michelle Montero	(substituted in) 78'
Manager:
Amelia Valverde

Formation: 4–3–3
GK	12	Yenith Bailey
LB	3	Carina Baltrip
CB	16	Rebeca Espinosa
CB	14	Yerenis De León
RB	4	Katherine Castillo	(yellow card) 59'	(substituted off) 74'
CM	15	María Guevara	(substituted off) 46'
DM	8	Laurie Batista	(substituted off) 74'
CM	19	Lineth Cedeño	(yellow card) 79'
LW	7	Kenia Rangel	(substituted off) 50'
CF	10	Marta Cox	(substituted off) 86'
RW	18	Erika Hernández
Substitutions:
DF	2	Hilary Jaén	(substituted in) 50'
MF	6	Deysiré Salazar	(substituted in) 46'
MF	9	Karla Riley	(substituted in) 74'
FW	20	Schiandra González	(substituted in) 74'
FW	11	Shayari Camarena	(substituted in) 86'
Manager:
(Mexico) Ignacio Quintana

Player of the Match:
(Costa Rica) Raquel Rodríguez

=== Canada vs Trinidad and Tobago ===
5 July 2022
21:00

Canada	6−0	Trinidad and Tobago
Sinclair 27'; Grosso 67', 79'; Fleming 84'; Beckie 86'; Huitema 90+1'	Report (FIFA); Report (CONCACAF)

Estadio BBVA, Guadalupe
Attendance: 3,872
Referee: Katia García (Mexico)

Canada

Team stats
Canada	Statistic	Trinidad and Tobago
37	Shots	1
13	Shots on target	0
74%	Possession	26%
590	Passes	222
86%	Pass accuracy	54%
11	Fouls	9
0	Yellow cards	1
0	Red cards	0
3	Offsides	0
8	Corners	0

Trinidad and Tobago

Formation: 4–4–2
GK	1	Kailen Sheridan
LB	10	Ashley Lawrence	(substituted off) 59'
CB	14	Vanessa Gilles
CB	3	Kadeisha Buchanan
RB	8	Jayde Riviere	(substituted off) 73'
LM	12	Christine Sinclair	(substituted off) 60'
CM	6	Deanne Rose	(substituted off) 60'
CM	5	Quinn
RM	11	Desiree Scott	(substituted off) 59'
LS	16	Janine Beckie
RS	17	Jessie Fleming
Substitutions:
DF	2	Allysha Chapman	(substituted in) 59'
DF	23	Bianca St-Georges	(substituted in) 73'
MF	7	Julia Grosso	(substituted in) 59'
FW	9	Jordyn Huitema	(substituted in) 60'
FW	19	Adriana Leon	(substituted in) 60'
Manager:
(England) Bev Priestman

Formation: 4–5–1
GK	1	Kimika Forbes
RB	3	Cecily Stoute
CB	8	Victoria Swift
CB	4	Rhea Belgrave	(yellow card) 39'
LB	2	Chelsi Jadoo
RM	14	Karyn Forbes
CM	11	Raenah Campbell	(substituted off) 63'
DM	10	Asha James	(substituted off) 75'
CM	6	Kédie Johnson	(substituted off) 75'
LM	12	Chelcy Ralph	(substituted off) 63'
FW	9	Brianna Austin
Substitutions:
MF	18	Maria-Frances Serrant	(substituted in) 63'
MF	15	Tori Paul	(substituted in) 75'
FW	16	Cayla McFarlane	(substituted in) 75'
FW	17	Jolie St. Louis	(substituted in) 63'
Manager:
Kenwyne Jones

Player of the Match:
(Canada) Julia Grosso

=== Trinidad and Tobago vs Costa Rica ===
8 July 2022
18:00

Trinidad and Tobago	0–4	Costa Rica
	Report (FIFA); Report (CONCACAF)	Granados 18', 44'; Hutchinson 33' (o.g.); Alvarado 48'

Estadio Universitario, San Nicolás de los Garza
Attendance: 3,025
Referee: Francia González (Mexico)

Trinidad and Tobago

Team stats
Trinidad and Tobago	Statistic	Costa Rica
2	Shots	16
0	Shots on target	10
34%	Possession	66%
97	Passes	262
72%	Pass accuracy	95%
8	Fouls	7
2	Yellow cards	0
1	Red cards	0
0	Offsides	2
0	Corners	6

Costa Rica

Formation: 4–4–2
GK	1	Kimika Forbes
RB	3	Cecily Stoute
CB	8	Victoria Swift
CB	4	Rhea Belgrave	(substituted off) 81'
LB	2	Chelsi Jadoo
RM	18	Maria-Frances Serrant	(substituted off) 75'
CM	14	Karyn Forbes
CM	20	Lauryn Hutchinson	(substituted off) 51'
LM	6	Kédie Johnson	(yellow card) 14' (yellow-red card) 22'
LM	17	Jolie St. Louis	(substituted off) 52'
FW	9	Brianna Austin	(substituted off) 81'
Substitutions:
DF	7	Liana Hinds	(substituted in) 51'
DF	13	Amaya Ellis	(substituted in) 81'
MF	12	Chelcy Ralph	(substituted in) 81'
FW	11	Raenah Campbell	(substituted in) 52'
FW	16	Cayla McFarlane	(substituted in) 75'
Manager:
Kenwyne Jones

Formation: 4–5–1
GK	23	Daniela Solera
RB	3	María Paula Coto
CB	20	Fabiola Villalobos
CB	4	Mariana Benavides
LB	8	Daniela Cruz
RM	7	Melissa Herrera	(substituted off) 81'
CM	15	Cristín Granados
DM	16	Katherine Alvarado	(substituted off) 74'
CM	11	Raquel Rodríguez	(substituted off) 62'
LM	14	Priscila Chinchilla
FW	19	María Paula Salas
Substitutions:
DF	12	Lixy Rodríguez	(substituted in) 81'
MF	10	Shirley Cruz	(substituted in) 62'
MF	21	Viviana Chinchilla	(substituted in) 74'
Manager:
Amelia Valverde

Player of the Match:
(Costa Rica) Cristín Granados

=== Panama vs Canada ===
8 July 2022
21:00

Panama	0–1	Canada
	Report (FIFA); Report (CONCACAF)	Grosso 64'

Estadio Universitario, San Nicolás de los Garza
Attendance: 3,249
Referee: Tori Penso (United States)

Panama

Team stats
Panama	Statistic	Canada
4	Shots	13
2	Shots on target	6
31%	Possession	69%
132	Passes	394
74%	Pass accuracy	93%
11	Fouls	9
2	Yellow cards	1
0	Red cards	0
1	Offsides	6
0	Corners	10

Canada

Formation: 4–3–3
GK	12	Yenith Bailey
RB	4	Katherine Castillo	(yellow card) 31'
CB	5	Yomira Pinzón
CB	14	Yerenis De León
LB	13	Wendy Natis	(substituted off) 56'
CM	8	Laurie Batista	(substituted off) 56'
DM	6	Deysiré Salazar	(yellow card) 90+3'
CM	2	Hilary Jaén
RW	10	Marta Cox	(substituted off) 70'
CF	9	Karla Riley	(substituted off) 70'
LW	20	Schiandra González
Substitutions:
DF	16	Rebeca Espinosa	(substituted in) 56'
DF	23	Rosario Vargas	(substituted in) 70'
FW	18	Erika Hernández	(substituted in) 56'
FW	19	Lineth Cedeño	(substituted in) 70'
Manager:
(Mexico) Ignacio Quintana

Formation: 4–3–3
GK	18	Sabrina D'Angelo
RB	16	Janine Beckie
CB	3	Kadeisha Buchanan
CB	4	Shelina Zadorsky
LB	10	Ashley Lawrence
CM	15	Nichelle Prince	(substituted off) 46'
DM	11	Desiree Scott	(substituted off) 57'
CM	7	Julia Grosso	(substituted off) 73'
RW	17	Jessie Fleming
CF	12	Christine Sinclair
LW	19	Adriana Leon	(yellow card) 36'
Substitutions:
DF	8	Jayde Riviere	(substituted in) 46'
MF	5	Quinn	(substituted in) 57'
FW	6	Deanne Rose	(substituted in) 73'
Manager:
(England) Bev Priestman

Player of the Match:
(Canada) Julia Grosso

=== Canada vs Costa Rica ===
11 July 2022
18:00

Canada	2–0	Costa Rica
Fleming 5'; Schmidt 69'	Report (FIFA); Report (CONCACAF)

Estadio BBVA, Guadalupe
Attendance: 3,721
Referee: Odette Hamilton (Jamaica)

Canada

Team stats
Canada	Statistic	Costa Rica
11	Shots	1
3	Shots on target	1
67%	Possession	33%
527	Passes	197
86%	Pass accuracy	92%
13	Fouls	6
2	Yellow cards	1
0	Red cards	0
2	Offsides	0
7	Corners	0

Costa Rica

Formation: 4–4–2
GK	18	Sabrina D'Angelo
RB	8	Jayde Riviere	(substituted off) 60'
CB	3	Kadeisha Buchanan
CB	14	Vanessa Gilles
LB	10	Ashley Lawrence
RM	11	Desiree Scott
CM	15	Quinn	(substituted off) 61'
CM	12	Christine Sinclair	(substituted off) 46'
LM	15	Nichelle Prince	(substituted off) 46'
CF	17	Jessie Fleming
CF	16	Janine Beckie	(yellow card) 39' (substituted off) 76'
Substitutions:
DF	2	Allysha Chapman	(substituted in) 60'
MF	13	Sophie Schmidt	(substituted in) 60' (yellow card) 67'
FW	9	Jordyn Huitema	(substituted in) 46'
FW	19	Adriana Leon	(substituted in) 46'
FW	20	Cloé Lacasse	(substituted in) 76'
Manager:
(England) Bev Priestman

Formation: 5–4–1
GK	23	Daniela Solera
RB	3	María Paula Coto
CB	20	Fabiola Villalobos
CB	4	Mariana Benavides
CB	5	Valeria del Campo	(substituted off) 84'
LB	8	Daniela Cruz	(yellow card) 14'
RM	7	Melissa Herrera
CM	15	Cristín Granados
CM	16	Katherine Alvarado
LM	14	Priscila Chinchilla	(substituted off) 77'
CF	11	Raquel Rodríguez
Substitutions:
DF	2	Gabriela Guillén	(substituted in) 77'
DF	6	Carol Sánchez	(substituted in) 84'
Manager:
Amelia Valverde

Player of the Match:
(Canada) Jessie Fleming

=== Panama vs Trinidad and Tobago ===
11 July 2022
18:00

Panama	1–0	Trinidad and Tobago
Cox 43'	Report (FIFA); Report (CONCACAF)

Estadio Universitario, San Nicolás de los Garza
Attendance: 3,969
Referee: Astrid Gramajo (Guatemala)

Panama

Team stats
Panama	Statistic	Trinidad and Tobago
15	Shots	2
4	Shots on target	1
60%	Possession	40%
292	Passes	179
89%	Pass accuracy	80%
7	Fouls	10
0	Yellow cards	1
0	Red cards	0
2	Offsides	0
4	Corners	2

Trinidad and Tobago

Formation: 5–4–1
GK	12	Yenith Bailey
RB	3	Carina Baltrip	(substituted off) 74'
CB	5	Yomira Pinzón
CB	13	Wendy Natis
CB	14	Yerenis De León
LB	2	Hilary Jaén
CM	6	Deysiré Salazar
CM	8	Laurie Batista	(substituted off) 35'
CF	9	Karla Riley	(substituted off) 74'
FW	10	Marta Cox	(substituted off) 90+1'
FW	16	Schiandra González
Substitutions:
DF	23	Rosario Vargas	(substituted in) 74'
MF	17	Gabriela Villagrand	(substituted in) 74'
FW	19	Lineth Cedeño	(substituted in) 35'
FW	19	Nicole De Obaldía	(substituted in) 90+1'
Manager:
(Mexico) Ignacio Quintana

Formation: 4–2–3–1
GK	1	Kimika Forbes
LB	2	Chelsi Jadoo	(substituted off) 89'
RB	3	Cecily Stoute
CB	4	Rhea Belgrave
CB	8	Victoria Swift
LM	11	Raenah Campbell	(substituted off) 64'
RM	18	Maria-Frances Serrant	(substituted off) 78'
CM	7	Liana Hinds
CM	13	Amaya Ellis	(yellow card) 31' (substituted off) 64'
CM	14	Karyn Forbes
FW	9	Brianna Austin	(substituted off) 89'
Substitutions:
MF	10	Asha James	(substituted in) 64'
MF	23	Sarah De Gannes	(substituted in) 89'
FW	15	Tori Paul	(substituted in) 64'
FW	17	Jolie St. Louis	(substituted in) 78'
FW	16	Cayla McFarlane	(substituted in) 89'
Manager:
Kenwyne Jones

Player of the Match:
(Panama) Marta Cox

== Discipline ==
Fair play points were used as tiebreakers in the group if the overall and head-to-head records of teams were tied. These are calculated based on yellow and red cards received in all group matches as follows:

- first yellow card: minus 1 point;
- indirect red card (second yellow card): minus 3 points;
- direct red card: minus 4 points;
- yellow card and direct red card: minus 5 points;

Team	Match 1				Match 2				Match 3				Points
Team	Booked	(yellow card) (yellow-red card)	Sent off (straight red)	(yellow card) (red card)	Booked	(yellow card) (yellow-red card)	Sent off (straight red)	(yellow card) (red card)	Booked	(yellow card) (yellow-red card)	Sent off (straight red)	(yellow card) (red card)	Points
Canada					1				2				–3
Costa Rica	1								1				–2
Panama	2				2								–4
Trinidad and Tobago	1					1			1				–5
