= Mia Corbin =

American soccer player (born 1997)

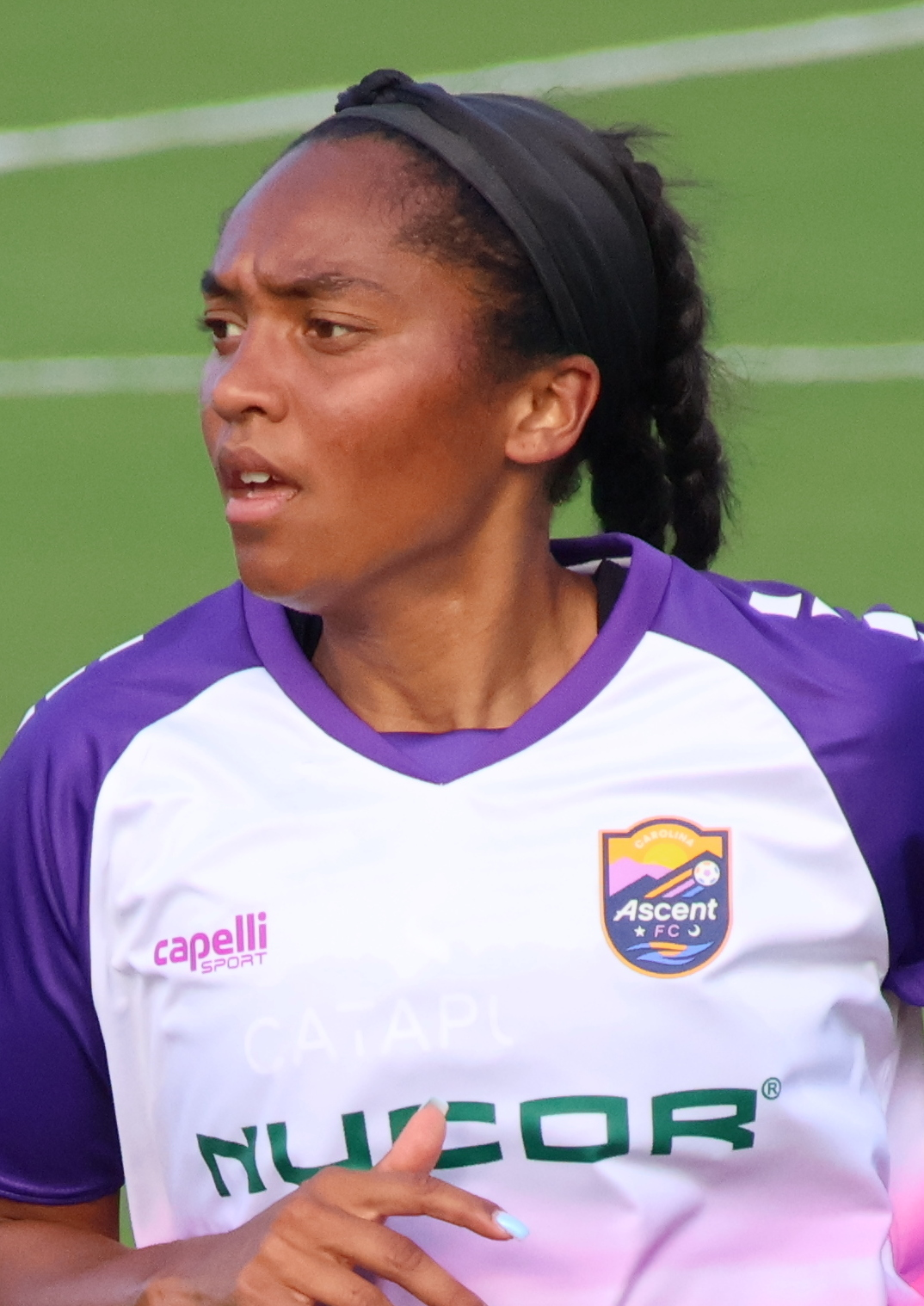
- Corbin with the Carolina Ascent in 2025

Personal information
- Full name: Mia Elizabeth Corbin
- Date of birth: May 25, 1997 (age 29)
- Place of birth: Maple Valley, Washington, U.S.
- Height: 5 ft 8 in (1.73 m)
- Positions: Forward; midfielder

Team information
- Current team: Carolina Ascent
- Number: 9

College career
Years	Team	Apps	(Gls)
2016–2019	California Golden Bears	80	(6)

Senior career*
Years	Team	Apps	(Gls)
2022	Alajuelense		(33)
2023	Parma	12	(3)
2023–2024	Brisbane Roar	22	(8)
2024–	Carolina Ascent	54	(16)
- * Club domestic league appearances and goals as of 17:25, June 4, 2026 (UTC)

Mia Elizabeth Corbin (born May 25, 1997) is an American professional soccer player who plays as a striker or midfielder for USL Super League club Carolina Ascent. She played college soccer for the California Golden Bears.

== Early life and college career ==
Corbin started playing soccer at the age of six. She attended Tahoma High School in Maple Valley, Washington, where she helped the softball team win the league. Corbin went on to attend the University of California, Berkeley, where she played for the Golden Bears women's soccer team as a midfielder and false nine.

== Club career ==
Corbin was a non-roster invitee for hometown club Seattle Reign in May 2021.

Corbin signed with Costa Rican side Alajuelense in February 2022. In less than a year, she became the club's all-time top scorer with 33 goals, surpassing María Paula Salas. She won the Costa Rican Women's Premier Division Golden Boot and led the leading club to both the Apertura and Clausura league titles.

After half a season with Serie A Femminile club Parma, where she had 3 goals in 12 games, Corbin moved to Australia and joined the Brisbane Roar in August 2023. She started all 22 games in the A-League Women and led the Roar with 8 goals, also adding 4 assists.

In May 2024, Corbin signed with USL Super League club Carolina Ascent, returning to the United States before the league's inaugural season. She led the Ascent with 12 goals (second in the league) in 28 games, helping the club to the inaugural Players' Shield. The following season, she scored the opening goal against Lexington SC in the 2026 USL Super League final, but the Ascent eventually lost 3–1 in extra time.

== Personal life ==
Corbin has three brothers.

== Honors ==
Alajuelense

- Costa Rican Women's Premier Division: Apertura 2022, Clausura 2022

Carolina Ascent

- USL Super League Players' Shield: 2024–25

Individual

- USL Super League All-League First Team: 2024–25
- Costa Rican Women's Premier Division Golden Boot: 2022
