= Gabriela Machuca =

Mexican footballer (born 1998)

Personal information
- Full name: Silvia Gabriela Machuca Rubio
- Date of birth: 23 March 1998 (age 28)
- Place of birth: Hidalgo del Parral, Chihuahua, Mexico
- Height: 1.64 m (5 ft 5 in)
- Position: Goalkeeper

Senior career*
Years	Team	Apps	(Gls)
2019–2020	Juárez	22	(0)
2020–2022	Pachuca	13	(0)
2022–2023	Cruz Azul	16	(0)
2023–2024	Sporting F.C.		
2024–2025	Puebla	16	(0)
- * Club domestic league appearances and goals as of 4 June 2023 ‡ National team caps and goals as of 12 March 2022

Silvia Gabriela Machuca Rubio (born 23 March 1998) is a Mexican professional footballer who played as a goalkeeper for Liga MX Femenil side Puebla.

== Career ==
In 2019, she started her career in Juárez. In 2020, she was transferred to Pachuca. In 2022, she joined to Cruz Azul. In 2023, she moved to Sporting F.C. Since 2024, she is part of Puebla .
