= Stephannie Blanco =

Costa Rican footballer (born 2000)

Personal information
- Full name: Stephannie Blanco Salazar
- Date of birth: 13 December 2000 (age 25)
- Place of birth: Talamanca, Costa Rica
- Height: 1.70 m (5 ft 7 in)
- Position: Defender

Team information
- Current team: Alajuelense

Senior career*
Years	Team	Apps	(Gls)
- Arenal Coronado
2020–2020	Alajuelense		
2020–2021	Deportivo La Coruña	32	(1)
2021–2023	Sporting de Huelva	6	(0)
2023–	Alajuelense		

International career^{‡}
2019–	Costa Rica	1	(1)
Medal record
Women's football
Representing Costa Rica
Pan American Games
Bronze medal – third place	2019 Lima	Team
- * Club domestic league appearances and goals as of 10 October 2021 ‡ National team caps and goals as of 28 July 2019

Stephannie Blanco Salazar (born 13 December 2000) is a Costa Rican professional footballer who plays as a defender for Costa Rican club Alajuelense and the Costa Rica women's national team.

== Club career ==
In January 2020 Stephannie joined Liga Deportiva Alajuelense.

== International goals ==
Scores and results list Costa Rica's goal tally first

No.	Date	Venue	Opponent	Score	Result	Competition
1	28 July 2019	Estadio Universidad San Marcos, Lima, Peru	Panama	2–1	3–1	2019 Pan American Games
2	3 March 2026	Bermuda National Stadium, Bermuda	Bermuda	3–0	8–0	2026 CONCACAF W Championship qualification

== Personal life ==
Blanco is a Bribri from Talamanca.
