= Emilie Valenciano =

Costa Rican footballer (born 1997)

Personal information
- Full name: Emilie Valenciano Rojas
- Date of birth: 15 February 1997 (age 29)
- Height: 1.65 m (5 ft 5 in)
- Position: Defender

Team information
- Current team: Alajuelense
- Number: 18

Senior career*
Years	Team	Apps	(Gls)
- Alajuelense
2019–????	Asheville City SC	0	(0)
????-2022	Sporting		
2022-2023	Ramat HaSharon		
2023-	Alajuelense	4	(0)

International career^{‡}
2015-	Costa Rica	11	(0)
- * Club domestic league appearances and goals ‡ National team caps and goals as of 23 July 2023

Emilie Valenciano Rojas (born 15 February 1997) is a Costa Rican footballer who plays as a defender for Alajuelense. She is a member of the Costa Rica women's national football team. She was part of the team at the 2015 FIFA Women's World Cup.

== International goals ==
No.	Date	Venue	Opponent	Score	Result	Competition
1.	31 October 2023	Estadio Sausalito, Viña del Mar, Chile	Paraguay	1–1	1–3	2023 Pan American Games
