= Sporting Football Club (women) =

Sporting F. C.
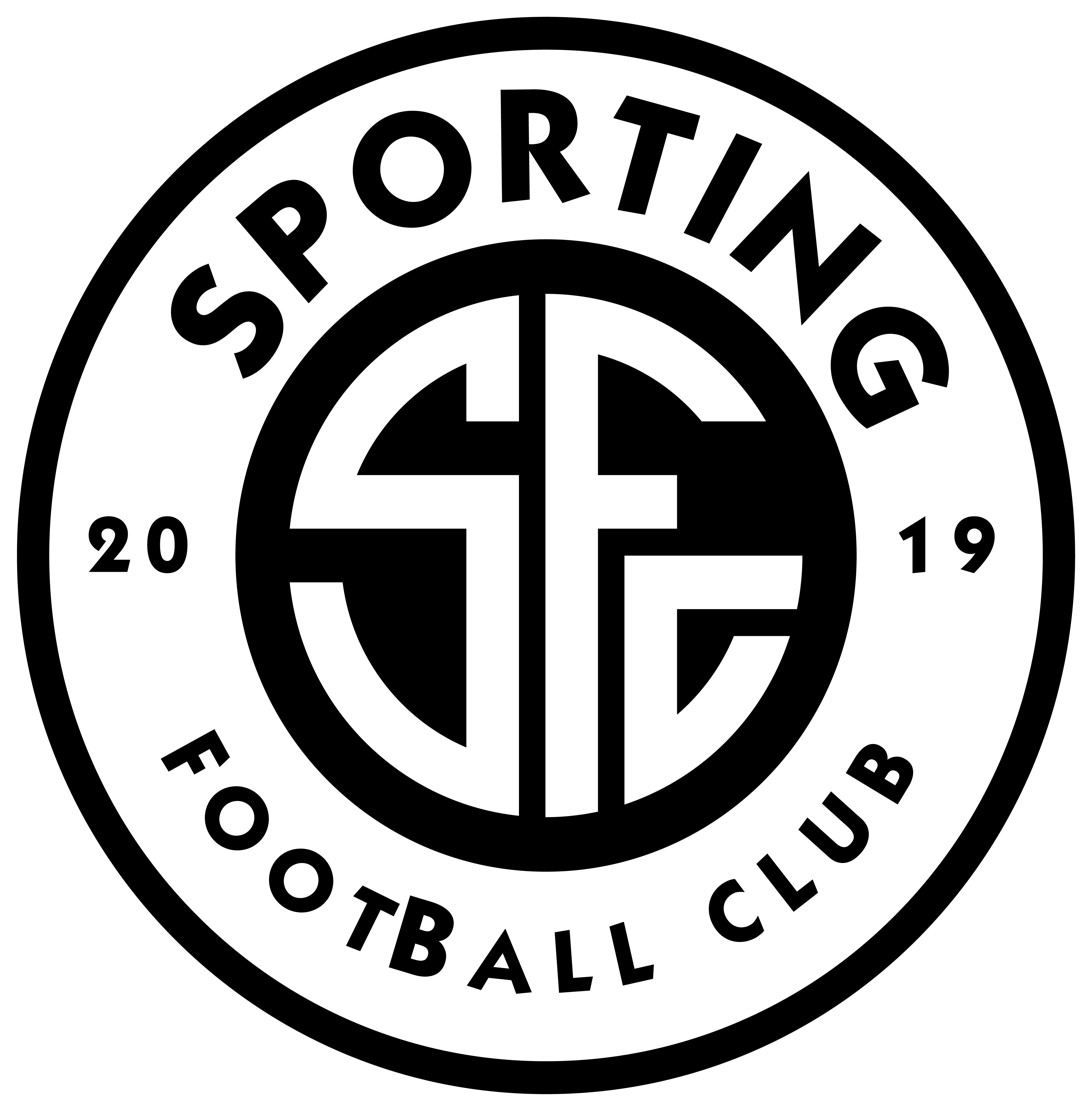
- Crest of Sporting Football Club
- Full name: Sporting Football Club
- Nickname: Albinegras
- Founded: 2020
- Ground: Stadium Ernesto Rohrmoser
- Capacity: 3,000
- President: (Costa Rica) José Maroto
- Manager: (Mexico) Ignacio Hierro
- Coach: (Costa Rica) José Rodríguez
- League: Costa Rican Women's Premier Division

The Sporting Football Club Women is a Women's football team that competes in the Costa Rican Women's Premier Division, the top division of women's football in Costa Rica.

== History ==
The Albinegras acquired the La U Universitarias franchise in 2020, obtaining their place in the Costa Rican top category. On March 1, 2020, they debuted in the First Division of Costa Rica, facing Suva Sports. The Albinegras managed to win in their debut match 5–3, with goals from Marilenis Oporta, María José Garro, Fernanda Chavarría, Karla Villalobos, and Indira González. In the club's first season, Sporting were in second place with 9 points in the 2020 Clausura Tournament. Due to the COVID-19 pandemic, the final tournament was cancelled, and declared void.

On July 9, 2022, they faced C. S. Herediano in the final of the Costa Rica Cup Tournament. The game ended with a 3–0 victory to the Albinegras, with goals scored by Katherine Arroyo, Daniela Mesén, and Yoselin Fonseca. Their second match, which took place on July 16 at the Ernesto Rohrmoser Stadium, ended with a 3–3 draw courtesy of a Katherine Arroyo hat-trick in the 19th, 28th and 87th minutes. Sporting FC won the fixture 6–3 on aggregate, obtaining their first title in historic fashion.

On January 15, 2023, the Costa Rica Super Cup was played against L. D. Alajuelense at the National Stadium. The first goal by was scored by Panamanian Karla Riley in the 68th minute, but the Alajuelense equalized through Alexandra Pinell in the 88th minute, making the match go into extra time. No further goals were scored, and a penalty shootout would decide the result of the match.

In the shootout, Daniela Solera saved two penalties, and due to successful penalties by Carol Sánchez, Celeste Jiménez, and Lourdes Viana, Sporting were crowned champions. The team was made up of: Daniela Solera, Diana Sáenz, Carol Sánchez, Celeste Jiménez, María Paula Porras, Fernanda Chavarría, Cristin Granados, Candela Andújar, Katherine Arroyo, Yerling Ovares, Karla Riley, Evanny Calvo, Steysi Arias, Jeimy Umaña, Emily Flores, Lourdes Viana, Raquel Chacón, Yesmi Rodríguez, Yoselin Fonseca, Tanisha Fonseca, Jimena González, and managed by Edgar Rodríguez.

== Stadium ==
The Ernesto Rohrmoser Stadium is located in Pavas, in the province of San José. It has a capacity of 3,000 spectators, with a synthetic grass field and is classified with two stars, according to FIFA.

== Managers ==
- (Costa Rica) Allan Campos (2020)
- (Costa Rica) Valiant Sunsing (2020)
- (Costa Rica) Randall Chacón (2020–2021)
- (Costa Rica) Edgar Rodríguez (2021–2023)
- (Costa Rica) José Rodríguez (2023-)

== Honors ==
=== National ===
- Costa Rican Women's Premier Division
- Runner-up (3): CL-2022, AP-2023, CL-2023
- Supercup Costa Rica
  - Winners (1): 2023
- Cup Tournament Costa Rica
  - Winners (1): 2022
