= María Coto =

Costa Rican footballer (born 1998)

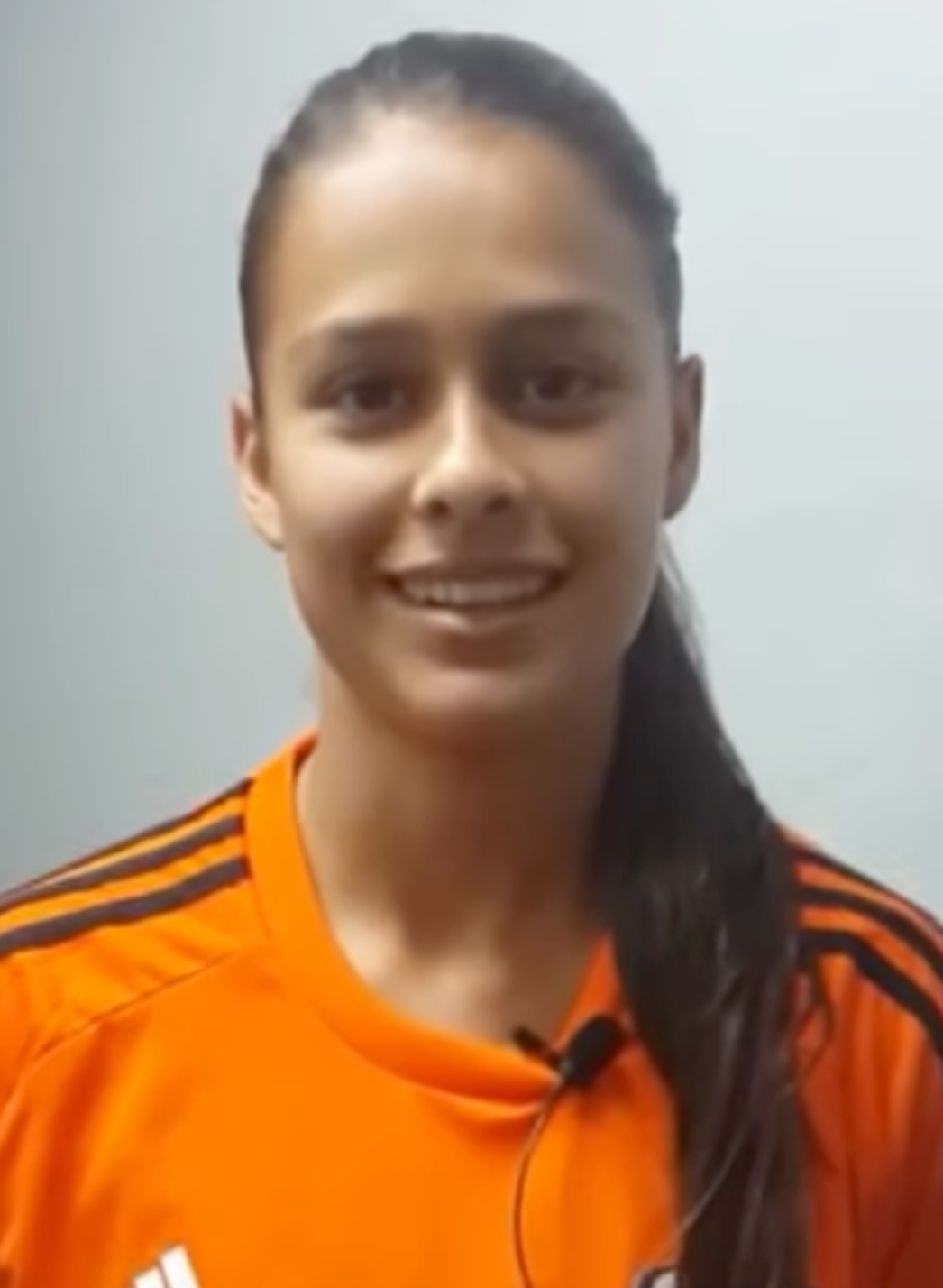
- In a 2018 interview

Personal information
- Full name: María Paula Coto González
- Date of birth: 2 March 1998 (age 28)
- Place of birth: Alajuela, Costa Rica
- Height: 1.66 m (5 ft 5 in)
- Position: Defender

Team information
- Current team: Alajuelense
- Number: 4

Senior career*
Years	Team	Apps	(Gls)
????-2021	Club Sport Herediano		
2022-	Alajuelense	2	(1)

International career^{‡}
2015-	Costa Rica	3	(0)
- * Club domestic league appearances and goals ‡ National team caps and goals as of 6 June 2015 (before the 2015 FIFA Women's World Cup)

María Paula Coto González (born 2 March 1998) is a Costa Rican footballer who plays as a defender for Alajuelense and the Costa Rica women's national team.

== Club career ==
Coto played for C.S. Herediano Femenino in Costa Rica.

== International career ==
Coto was part of the Costa Rican team at the 2015 FIFA Women's World Cup.

== International goals ==
No.	Date	Venue	Opponent	Score	Result	Competition
1.	25 June 2022	Estadio Alejandro Morera Soto, Alajuela, Costa Rica	Haiti	2–0	2–1	Friendly
