= Costa Rica women's national football team =

Women's national association football team representing Costa Rica

Costa Rica
- Nickname(s): Las Ticas; La Sele Femenina (The Women's Selection); La Tricolor (The Tricolor)
- Association: Federación Costarricense de Fútbol (FCRF)
- Confederation: CONCACAF (North America, Central America and the Caribbean)
- Sub-confederation: Central American Football Union (Central America)
- Head coach: Lindsay Camila
- Captain: Katherine Alvarado
- Most caps: Katherine Alvarado (144)
- Top scorer: Raquel Rodriguez (55)
- Home stadium: Estadio Nacional de Costa Rica
- FIFA code: CRC
First colours	Second colours

FIFA ranking
- Current: 41 ▲2 (20 October 2026)
- Highest: 29 (June–December 2016)
- Lowest: 50 (March 2007)

First international
- Canada 6–0 Costa Rica (Port-au-Prince, Haiti; 16 April 1991)

Biggest win
- Costa Rica 21–0 Cayman Islands (Alajuela, Costa Rica; 10 April 2026)

Biggest defeat
- Brazil 8–0 Costa Rica (Hershey, United States; 22 June 2000); United States 8–0 Costa Rica (Louisville, United States; 25 June 2000); United States 8–0 Costa Rica (Pittsburgh, United States; 16 August 2015)

World Cup
- Appearances: 2 (first in 2015)
- Best result: Group stage (2015, 2023)

CONCACAF W Championship
- Appearances: 8 (first in 1991)
- Best result: Runners-up (2014)
Medal record
Pan American Games
Bronze medal – third place	1999 Winnipeg	Team
Bronze medal – third place	2019 Lima	Team

The Costa Rica women's national football team (Spanish: Selección femenina de fútbol de Costa Rica) represents Costa Rica in women's international football. The national team is controlled by the governing body Costa Rican Football Federation. They are one of the top women's national football teams in the Central American region along with Guatemala and Panama.

Costa Rica is set to co-host the 2031 FIFA Women's World Cup along with Jamaica, Mexico and United States, earning them an automatic qualification as co-host.

Since the 2010s, Costa Rica has emerged in women's football, and akin to their men's counterparts, its women's side is also visibly recognised as a stern and competitive opponent despite relative recent entrance to the big stage. In Costa Rica's first World Cup in 2015, despite being rated the weakest team in the group, Costa Rica shocked the tournament with two points by drawing against strong Spain and South Korea sides, and was only eliminated by a late goal from Brazil.

== History ==
The Costa Rican team started to play international matches in 1990, when Central America had little faith in developing women's football. The success of men's team helped the FCF to believe on the women's team. Their first tournament was the 1991 CONCACAF Women's Championship when Costa Rica finished third and was out from the group stage.

Costa Rica started gaining success in the 1998 CONCACAF Women's Championship and 1999 Pan American Games when Costa Rica won bronze at both. Unfortunately this did not lead to more immediate success, as the national team was still struggling under the shadow of men's team.

At the 2014 CONCACAF Women's Championship, Costa Rica surprisingly won silver, after losing 0–6 to the USA in the final. Their second-place finish secured them a spot in the 2015 FIFA Women's World Cup. This marked the first time Costa Rica would play in a FIFA Women's World Cup.

Costa Rica was drawn into a group with Brazil, South Korea and Spain for the 2015 FIFA Women's World Cup. Costa Rica secured two shocking draws over Spain (1–1) and South Korea (2–2), but then lost 1–0 to Brazil and were eliminated in the group stage.

At the 2018 CONCACAF Women's Championship, Costa Rica was hoping to once again qualify for the FIFA Women's World Cup. They won their first group match 8–0 over Cuba. However they lost their second match 1–0 to Jamaica in which they controversially had a goal disallowed in the second half. Costa Rica would lose their final group match to Canada 3–1, elimating their chances of qualifying for the 2019 FIFA Women's World Cup.

Costa Rica placed much better in the 2022 CONCACAF W Championship, taking second place in their group after wins over Panama and Trinidad and Tobago. They were unable to replicate their 2014 success, finishing fourth overall, but the win allowed Costa Rica to return to the Women's World Cup in 2023. Unfortunately, they were drawn into a tough group with Spain, Japan and Zambia, and lost all three of their group stage matches to finish bottom of the group.

== Team image ==
=== Nicknames ===
The Costa Rica women's national football team has been known or nicknamed as "La Sele (The Selection)" or "La Tricolor (The Tricolor)".

=== Home stadium ===
Costa Rica plays their home matches on the Estadio Nacional de Costa Rica.

== Results and fixtures ==
The following is a list of match results in the last 12 months, as well as any future matches that have been scheduled.

Legend

Win Draw Loss Fixture

=== 2025 ===
21 October 2025 2025 Central American Games	Panama	1–2	Costa Rica	Guatemala City, Guatemala
10:00 UTC−5	Bermúdez 81' (o.g.)		Varela 45+3'; Salas 90'	Stadium: Cementos Progreso Stadium

25 October 2025 2025 Central American Games	Costa Rica	1–0	El Salvador	Guatemala City, Guatemala
10:00 UTC−5	Salas 90'	Report		Stadium: Cementos Progreso Stadium

27 October 2025 2025 Central American Games	Costa Rica	0–0 (5–4 p)	Guatemala	Guatemala City, Guatemala
10:00 UTC−5				Stadium: Cementos Progreso Stadium

29 October 2025 2025 Central American Games	El Salvador	0–1	Costa Rica	Guatemala City, Guatemala
10:00 UTC−5		Report	Varela 31'	Stadium: Cementos Progreso Stadium

29 November 2026 CONCACAF W Championship Q	Grenada	1–2	Costa Rica	St. George's, Grenada
19:30	Bedeau 32'	Report (FIFA); Report (CONCACAF)	Chinchilla 45+2', 61'	Stadium: Kirani James Athletic Stadium; Referee: Janeishka Caban (Puerto Rico)

2 December Friendly	Costa Rica	0–2	Mexico	Alajuela, Costa Rica
18:00 UTC−6		Report	Soto 68'; Ordóñez 90+3'	Stadium: Complejo Deportivo FEDEFUTBOL Plycem

=== 2026 ===
27 February Friendly	Costa Rica	2–5	Brazil	Alajuela, Costa Rica
19:00 UTC−6	Chinchilla 52', 67'	Report	Kerolin 11'; Jheniffer 14'; Maranhão 28', 90+2'; Adriana 81' (pen.)	Stadium: Estadio Alejandro Morera Soto

3 March 2026 CONCACAF W Championship qualification	Bermuda	0–8	Costa Rica	Devonshire Parish, Bermuda
19:00 UTC−4		Report (FIFA); Report (CONCACAF)	Villalobos 5'; Scott 8', 75' (pen.); Chinchilla 16', 87'; Masters 30' (o.g.); Alvarado 39'; Blanco 70'	Stadium: Bermuda National Stadium; Referee: Alex Billiter (United States)

10 April 2026 CONCACAF W Championship qualification	Costa Rica	21–0	Cayman Islands	Alajuela, Costa Rica
18:00 UTC−6	Del Campo 10', 90+2'; Chinchilla 11', 38', 40', 53', 60', 79', 90'; Benavides 13', 33'; R. Rodríguez 19', 24', 49'; Scott 22', 47'; Salas 46', 63', 75'; M. Herrera 51'; P. Rodríguez 82'	Report (FIFA); Report (CONCACAF)		Stadium: Estadio Alejandro Morera Soto; Referee: Merlin Soto (Honduras)

18 April 2026 CONCACAF W Championship qualification	Costa Rica	3–0	Guatemala	San José, Costa Rica
18ː00 UTC−6	Villalobos 13'; Scott 63'; Chinchilla 88'	Report (FIFA); Report (CONCACAF)		Stadium: Estadio Nacional

5 June Friendly	El Salvador	1–1	Costa Rica	San Salvador
20:00 UTC−6	Gilbertson 63'	Report	Velásquez 80'	Stadium: Estadio Jorge "El Mágico" González

9 June Friendly	Costa Rica	0–6	Canada	Santa Ana, Costa Rica
21:30 ET	Coto (red card) 53'	Report	Viens 7'; Sonis 41', 54' (pen.), 78' (pen.); Huitema 84'; Alidou 90+2'	Stadium: Estadio Piedades de Santa Ana

27 November 2026 CONCACAF W Championship QF	Jamaica	v	Costa Rica	Mansfield, United States
16:00 UTC−6				Stadium: Texas Health Mansfield Stadium

See Also

- Costa Rica Results and Fixtures – Soccerway.com
- Costa Rica Results and Fixtures – FIFA.com

== Coaching staff ==
=== Current coaching staff ===
Name	Nat	Position
Benito Rubido	(Spain)	Head coach
Edgar Rodríguez	(Costa Rica)	Assistant coach
Ana Patricia Aguilar	(Costa Rica)	Assistant coach
Eli Avila	(Costa Rica)	Goalkeeping coach
Bryan Mora	(Costa Rica)	Physical coach

=== Manager history ===
Name	Nat	Year
Jorge Álvarez	(Costa Rica)	1976
Guillermo Soto	(Costa Rica)	1991
Didier Castro	(Costa Rica)	1998 – 1999
Luis Diego Castro	(Costa Rica)	2000
Leroy Lewis	(Costa Rica)	2000
Didier Castro	(Costa Rica)	2001
Ricardo Rodríguez	(Costa Rica)	2002 – 2006
Allan Brown	(Costa Rica)	2006 (interim)
Juan Diego Quesada	(Costa Rica)	2008 – 2009
Randall Chacón	(Costa Rica)	2010
Karla Alemán	(Costa Rica)	2011 – 2012
José Luis Díaz	(Spain)	2013
Garabet Avedissian	(Uruguay)	2014
Amelia Valverde	(Costa Rica)	2015 – 2023
Ana Patricia Aguilar	(Costa Rica)	2023 (interim)
Edgar Rodríguez	(Costa Rica)	2023 (interim)
Benito Rubido	(Spain)	2023 – Present

== Players ==
Up-to-date caps, goals, and statistics are not publicly available; therefore, caps and goals listed may be incorrect.

=== Current squad ===
- The following players were named for the 2026 CONCACAF W Championship qualification matches in November 2025.
  Caps and goals accurate as of 2 December 2025 after match vs. Mexico.

No.	Pos.	Player	Date of birth (age)	Caps	Goals	Club
1	GK	Noelia Bermúdez	20 September 1994 (age 32)	30	0	(Costa Rican Football Federation) Alajuelense
18	GK	Génesis Pérez	4 May 2005 (age 21)	8	0	(United States Soccer Federation) UCF Knights
23	GK	Daniela Solera	21 July 1997 (age 29)	25	0	(Mexican Football Federation) Mazatlán
2	DF	Daniela Cruz	8 March 1991 (age 35)	90	2	(Mexican Football Federation) Atlas
3	DF	María Paula Coto	2 March 1998 (age 28)	25	2	(Costa Rican Football Federation) Alajuelense
4	DF	Fabiola Villalobos	13 March 1998 (age 28)	38	3	(Costa Rican Football Federation) Alajuelense
5	DF	Mariana Benavides	26 December 1994 (age 31)	72	2	(Colombian Football Federation) Millonarios
6	DF	Valeria del Campo	15 December 2000 (age 25)	14	0	(Mexican Football Federation) Monterrey
15	DF	Stephannie Blanco	13 December 2000 (age 25)	11	1	(Royal Spanish Football Federation) Real Oviedo
16	DF	Jimena González	31 December 2005 (age 20)	0	0	(Costa Rican Football Federation) Sporting
17	DF	Josselyn Briceño	29 April 2006 (age 20)	0	0	(Argentine Football Association) Talleres
19	DF	Marian Solano	19 May 2006 (age 20)	2	0	(Costa Rican Football Federation) Herediano
6	MF	Emily Flores	19 November 2001 (age 25)	3	0	(Mexican Football Federation) Querétaro
8	MF	Gloriana Villalobos	20 August 1999 (age 27)	76	10	(Costa Rican Football Federation) Saprissa
10	MF	Sheika Scott	22 October 2006 (age 20)	6	0	(French Football Federation) Paris FC
11	MF	Raquel Rodríguez	18 October 1993 (age 33)	108	58	(United States Soccer Federation) Kansas City Current
16	MF	Katherine Alvarado	11 April 1991 (age 35)	133	20	(Costa Rican Football Federation) Saprissa
7	FW	Melissa Herrera	10 October 1996 (age 30)	94	20	(French Football Federation) Marseille
9	FW	María Paula Salas	12 July 2002 (age 24)	37	8	(Turkish Football Federation) Fenerbahçe
12	FW	Carolina Venegas	28 September 1991 (age 35)	72	18	(Costa Rican Football Federation) Saprissa
13	FW	María Paula Arce	9 March 2004 (age 22)	0	0	(Costa Rican Football Federation) Alajuelense
14	FW	Hilary Corrales	4 December 1999 (age 26)	3	0	(Costa Rican Football Federation) Herediano
17	FW	Alexa Herrera	16 November 2004 (age 22)	3	1	(Mexican Football Federation) Querétaro
20	FW	Priscila Chinchilla	11 July 2001 (age 25)	48	20	(Royal Spanish Football Federation) Atlético Madrid
21	FW	Pamela Elizondo	27 May 2001 (age 25)	0	0	(Costa Rican Football Federation) Dimas Escazú
22	FW	Catalina Estrada	11 October 1998 (age 28)	3	0	(Mexican Football Federation) Cruz Azul
24	FW	Sianyf Agüero	27 January 2004 (age 22)	0	0	(Costa Rican Football Federation) Alajuelense

=== Recent call-ups ===
The following players have been called up to a Costa Rica squad in the past 12 months.

Pos.	Player	Date of birth (age)	Caps	Goals	Club	Latest call-up

Notes:

- PRE: Preliminary roster

=== Previous squads ===
FIFA Women's World Cup

- 2015 FIFA Women's World Cup squad
- 2023 FIFA Women's World Cup squad

CONCACAF W Championship

- 2010 CONCACAF Women's World Cup Qualifying squad
- 2014 CONCACAF Women's Championship squad
- 2018 CONCACAF Women's Championship squad
- 2022 CONCACAF W Championship squad

== Records ==
As of 21 February 2021
Players in bold are still active, at least at club level.

=== Most capped players ===
#	Player	Year(s)	Caps

=== Top goalscorers ===
#	Player	Year(s)	Goals	Caps

== Competitive record ==
=== FIFA Women's World Cup ===
FIFA Women's World Cup record
Year	Result	Pld	W	D*	L	GF	GA
(China) 1991	Did not qualify						
(Sweden) 1995	Did not enter						
(United States) 1999	Did not qualify						
(United States) 2003	Did not qualify						
(China) 2007	Did not qualify						
(Germany) 2011	Did not qualify						
(Canada) 2015	Group stage	3	0	2	1	3	4
(France) 2019	Did not qualify						
(Australia) (New Zealand) 2023	Group stage	3	0	0	3	1	8
(Brazil) 2027	To be determined						
(Costa Rica) (Jamaica) (Mexico) (United States) 2031	Qualified as co-host						
(United Kingdom) 2035	To be determined						
Total	Group stage	6	0	2	4	4	12

*Draws include knockout matches decided on penalty kicks.

FIFA Women's World Cup history
Year	Round	Date	Opponent	Result	Stadium
(Canada) 2015	Group stage	9 June	Spain	**D** 1–1	Olympic Stadium, Montreal
(Canada) 2015	Group stage	13 June	South Korea	**D** 2–2	Olympic Stadium, Montreal
(Canada) 2015	Group stage	17 June	Brazil	**L** 0–1	Moncton Stadium, Moncton
(Australia) (New Zealand) 2023	Group stage	21 July	Spain	**L** 0–3	Wellington Regional Stadium, Wellington
(Australia) (New Zealand) 2023	Group stage	26 July	Japan	**L** 0–2	Forsyth Barr Stadium, Dunedin
(Australia) (New Zealand) 2023	Group stage	31 July	Zambia	**L** 1–3	Waikato Stadium, Hamilton

=== Olympic Games ===
Summer Olympics record									Qualifying record					
Year	Round	Position	Pld	W	D*	L	GF	GA	Pld	W	D*	L	GF	GA
(United States) 1996	Did not enter								1995 FIFA WWC					
(Australia) 2000	Did not qualify								1999 FIFA WWC					
(Greece) 2004	Did not qualify								5	2	0	3	8	11
(China) 2008	Did not qualify								6	2	1	3	11	7
(United Kingdom) 2012	Did not qualify								8	6	0	2	25	12
(Brazil) 2016	Did not qualify								7	5	0	2	22	10
(Japan) 2020	Did not qualify								6	4	0	2	15	8
(France) 2024	Did not qualify								2022 CONCACAF W Championship					
Total	–	–	–	–	–	–	–	–	32	19	1	12	81	48

*Draws include knockout matches decided on penalty kicks.

=== CONCACAF W Championship ===
CONCACAF W Championship record								Qualification record					
Year	Result	Pld	W	D*	L	GF	GA	Pld	W	D*	L	GF	GA
(Haiti) 1991	Group stage	3	1	0	2	2	11	Invited					
(United States) 1993	Did not enter							Did not enter					
(Canada) 1994	Did not enter							Did not enter					
(Canada) 1998	**Third place**	**5**	**3**	**0**	**2**	**11**	**7**	3	2	0	1	23	3
(United States) 2000	Group Stage	3	0	1	2	2	18	3	2	1	0	24	5
(United States) (Canada) 2002	**Fourth place**	**5**	**2**	**0**	**3**	**8**	**14**	4	4	0	0	16	3
(United States) 2006	Did not qualify							2	0	0	2	1	4
(Mexico) 2010	**Fourth place**	**5**	**2**	**0**	**3**	**4**	**11**	2	2	0	0	4	0
(United States) 2014	**Runners-up**	**5**	**4**	**0**	**1**	**10**	**9**	3	3	0	0	10	0
(United States) 2018	Group stage	3	1	0	2	9	4	3	3	0	0	18	2
(Mexico) 2022	**Fourth place**	**5**	**2**	**0**	**3**	**7**	**6**	4	4	0	0	22	0
(United States) 2026	Qualified							4	4	0	0	34	1
Total	Runners-up	34	15	1	18	53	80	28	24	1	3	152	18

*Draws include knockout matches decided on penalty kicks.

=== CONCACAF W Gold Cup ===
CONCACAF W Gold Cup record								Qualification record							
Year	Result	GP	W	D*	L	GF	GA	Division	Group	GP	W	D*	L	GF	GA
(United States) 2024	Quarterfinals	4	1	0	3	2	5	A	C	4	3	0	1	32	2
(N/A) 2029	To be determined							To be determined							
Total	1/1	4	1	0	3	2	5	–	–	4	3	0	1	32	2

*Draws include knockout matches decided on penalty kicks.

=== Pan American Games ===
Pan American Games record
Year	Result	Pld	W	D*	L	GF	GA
(Canada) 1999	(bronze) **Bronze medal**	**6**	**1**	**1**	**4**	**4**	**17**
(Dominican Republic) 2003	Group stage	2	0	0	2	2	5
(Brazil) 2007	Did not enter						
(Mexico) 2011	Group stage	3	0	1	2	5	8
(Canada) 2015	Group stage	3	1	0	2	2	5
(Peru) 2019	(bronze) **Bronze medal**	**5**	**3**	**1**	**1**	**10**	**6**
(Chile) 2023	Sixth place	4	0	2	2	2	6
Total	(bronze) Bronze medal	23	5	5	13	25	47

*Draws include knockout matches decided on penalty kicks.

=== Central American and Caribbean Games ===
Central American and Caribbean Games record
Year	Result	Pld	W	D*	L	GF	GA
(Puerto Rico) 2010	Did not enter						
(Mexico) 2014	(bronze) **Bronze medal**	**5**	**4**	**0**	**1**	**14**	**5**
(Colombia) 2018	(silver) **Silver medal**	**5**	**4**	**0**	**1**	**8**	**5**
(El Salvador) 2023	Group Stage	**3**	**1**	**0**	**2**	**3**	**6**
Total	(silver) Silver medal	13	9	0	4	25	16

*Draws include knockout matches decided on penalty kicks.

=== Central American Games ===
Central American Games record
Year	Result	Pld	W	D*	L	GF	GA
(Guatemala) 2001	(gold) **Gold medal**	**4**	**4**	**0**	**0**	**18**	**3**
(Costa Rica) 2013	(gold) **Gold medal**	**5**	**5**	**0**	**0**	**27**	**1**
(Nicaragua) 2017	(gold) **Gold medal**	**5**	**4**	**1**	**0**	**19**	**2**
(El Salvador) 2022	Cancelled						
(Guatemala) 2025	(gold) **Gold medal**	**4**	**3**	**1**	**0**	**4**	**1**
Total	(gold) Gold medal	18	16	2	0	68	7

*Draws include knockout matches decided on penalty kicks.

== Honours ==
=== Major competitions ===
- **CONCACAF W Championship**

Runners-up (1): 2014
Third place (1): 1998

=== Others competitions ===
**Intercontinental**

- **Pan American Games**

Bronze medalists (2): 1999, 2019

**Regional**

- **Central American and Caribbean Games**

Silver Medalists (1): 2018
Bronze Medalists (1): 2014

- **Central American Games**

Gold Medalists (3): 2001, 2013, 2017

== FIFA World Ranking ==
A line chart depicting the history of the Costa Rica's year-end placements in the FIFA World Rankings.

Last update was on June 25, 2021 Source:

Best Ranking Worst Ranking Best Mover Worst Mover

Costa Rica's FIFA World Ranking History
Rank	Year	Best		Worst	
Rank	Year	Rank	Move	Rank	Move
36	2021	—	—	—	—
35	2020	35	▲1	36	▼1
37	2019	36	▲1	38	▼1
37	2018	32	▲1	37	▼3
33	2017	30	▲1	33	▼1
29	2016	29	▲4	30	Steady
34	2015	34	▲3	37	Steady
37	2014	37	▲3	40	Steady
40	2013	40	Steady	40	Steady
40	2012	40	▲1	40	Steady
41	2011	41	▲3	44	▼2
41	2010	41	▲6	47	▼4
46	2009	46	Steady	46	Steady
46	2008	45	▲3	48	▼1
48	2007	48	▲1	50	▼1
49	2006	46	▲2	49	▼1
46	2005	45	Steady	46	▼1
45	2004	45	▲1	45	Steady
46	2003	45	Steady	46	▼1

== See also ==
- Sport in Costa Rica
  - Football in Costa Rica
    - Women's football in Costa Rica
- Costa Rica women's national football team
  - Costa Rica women's national football team results
  - List of Costa Rica women's international footballers
- Costa Rica women's national under-20 football team
- Costa Rica women's national under-17 football team
- Costa Rica men's national football team
