= Daniela Solera =

Costa Rican footballer (born 1997)

Personal information
- Full name: Daniela Solera Vega
- Date of birth: 21 July 1997 (age 29)
- Place of birth: Alajuela, Costa Rica
- Height: 1.83 m (6 ft 0 in)
- Position: Goalkeeper

Team information
- Current team: Hapoel Katamon Jerusalem
- Number: 22

Senior career*
| Years | Team | Apps | (Gls) |
| 2016 | Alajuelense | | |
| 2017–2018 | Atlético Huila | | |
| 2019 | KuPS | | |
| 2020 | Santa Fe | | |
| 2021–2022 | Santa Teresa | | |
| 2022–2023 | Sporting San José | | |
| 2023–2025 | Atlas | 48 | (0) |
| 2025–2026 | Mazatlán | 21 | (0) |
| 2026– | Hapoel Katamon Jerusalem | | |

International career^{‡}
| 2018– | Costa Rica | 23 | (0) |
- * Club domestic league appearances and goals as of 29 July 2026 ‡ National team caps and goals as of 01:11, 24 July 2023 (UTC)

Daniela Solera Vega (born 21 July 1997) is a Costa Rican footballer who plays as a goalkeeper for Hapoel Katamon Jerusalem and the Costa Rica women's national team.

Having started her career while at school in her home province, Solera then had highly successful stints in the Colombian Women's Football League that each facilitated moves to Europe. With the national team she has competed in several tournaments, notably participating in the 2023 FIFA Women's World Cup.

== Early life ==
Daniela Solera Vega was born in San Antonio, Alajuela, on 21 July 1997. Her older brothers first interested her in football, when she played with them at home. She preferred playing with boys, but was forbidden from playing on the school team over fears that they would hurt her; when one of the players was ill, Solera asked to play in his place. Even though she had not trained with them, she did play at school breaks, so the match went well and she continued. A year later she was given a trial for local team Alajuelense; the club asked which position she wanted to trial in, and she chose goalkeeping.

== Club career ==
Solera began her career in Costa Rica, playing for Alajuelense in the Costa Rican Women's Premier Division from the age of 12 until she was 19. At this point, she considered quitting due to the lack of professionalism making football a non-viable career, and for having to travel extensively by bus and on foot to reach the training grounds. However, she received an offer to join Atlético Huila in Colombia, and she played there in 2017–2018. With Huila she became the first Costa Rican player of any gender to win a Copa Libertadores title, with the 2018 Copa Libertadores Femenina. They also came second in the Colombian Women's Football League.

Following her successful season at Huila, Solera received offers from Europe, and moved to play for KuPS Kuopio in Finland in 2019; surprised that she had been able to make this step so young, she took the experience as a form of training. She was then about to sign for a team in Belgium before Diego Perdomo, the former boss of Huila, asked her to return to Colombia to play in his new team, Independiente Santa Fe. Not attracted to the deal she was offered in Belgium, and preferring to be closer to Costa Rica, she accepted. In 2021 she was named the best goalkeeper in the Colombian league for the previous season.

Her success in Colombia was again followed by a move to Europe, where she played for Santa Teresa CD in the Spanish Segunda Federación in the 2021–22 season, saying she was proud to be able to play there.

She then returned to Costa Rica to play for Sporting F.C.'s women's team; her signing was considered a great coup for Sporting. They lost to Solera's former club Alajuelense, the dominant team in Costa Rica, in the 2022 Clausura final by a single goal on aggregate after handing Alajuelense their first loss in a championship game. A month later, in January 2023, Sporting beat Alajuelense in the final of the Supercopa: decided by penalty shoot-out, Solera was described as Sporting's heroine.

Solera spent the next 3 seasons in the Mexican Liga MX Femenil, 2 seasons with Atlas, and one with Mazatlán.

Solera then signed with Hapoel Katamon Jerusalem, champions of the Israeli Premier League.

== International career ==
Solera played for Costa Rica at the 2018 CONCACAF Women's Championship, and won the silver with them at the 2018 Central American and Caribbean Games. She was part of the team that came fourth at the 2022 CONCACAF W Championship to see them qualify for the 2023 FIFA Women's World Cup.

Having been vital in the qualification, Solera made her World Cup debut for Costa Rica at the 2023 tournament in Australia and New Zealand. They played their opening match on Solera's 26th birthday and though they lost 0–3 to Spain an ITV Sport commentator still noted that Solera would "have a showreel of saves" after the game, which included saving a Jennifer Hermoso penalty. Solera had the most touches of any Costa Rican player as the highly ranked Spain took 46 shots (12 on goal) in the match; all three goals were scored in a period of six minutes, with the first being a Costa Rican defender's own goal off a cross that Solera had batted away.
