= Natalia Mills =

Panamanian footballer (born 1993)

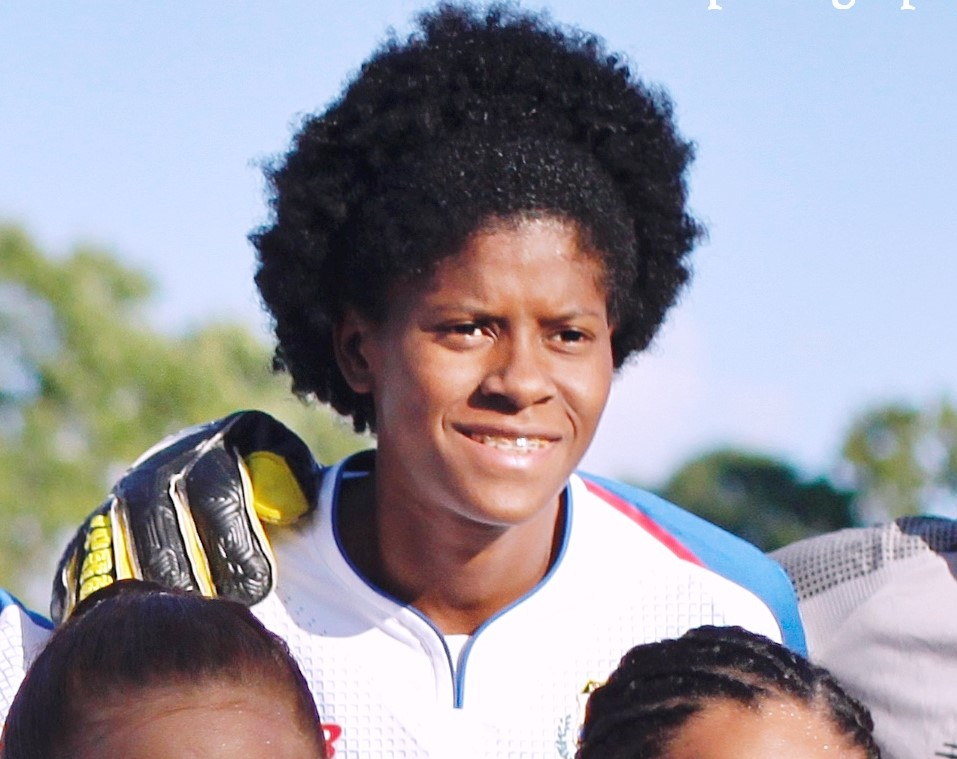
- Mills with Panama in 2018

Personal information
- Full name: Natalia Didelka Mills Urrunaga
- Date of birth: 22 March 1993 (age 33)
- Place of birth: Parque Lefevre, Panama City, Panama
- Height: 1.75 m (5 ft 9 in)
- Position: Forward

Team information
- Current team: Alajuelense
- Number: 6

Senior career*
Years	Team	Apps	(Gls)
2019–2020	Fundación Albacete	3	(0)
2020	Atlético Nacional		
2021	Córdoba		
2021–	Alajuelense		

International career^{‡}
2009–2010	Panama U17	5	(2)
2011–2012	Panama U20	6	(1)
2013–	Panama	26	(8)
- * Club domestic league appearances and goals as of 28 September 2019 ‡ National team caps and goals as of 26 June 2023

Natalia Didelka Mills Urrunaga (born 22 March 1993) is a Panamanian footballer who plays as a forward for Campeonato de Fútbol Femenino club Talleres and captains the Panama women's national team.

== International goals ==
No.	Date	Venue	Opponent	Score	Result	Competition
1.	24 February 2024	Snapdragon Stadium, San Diego, United States	Puerto Rico	1–0	1–2	2024 CONCACAF W Gold Cup

== See also ==
- List of Panama women's international footballers
