= Noelia Bermúdez =

Costa Rican footballer (born 1994)

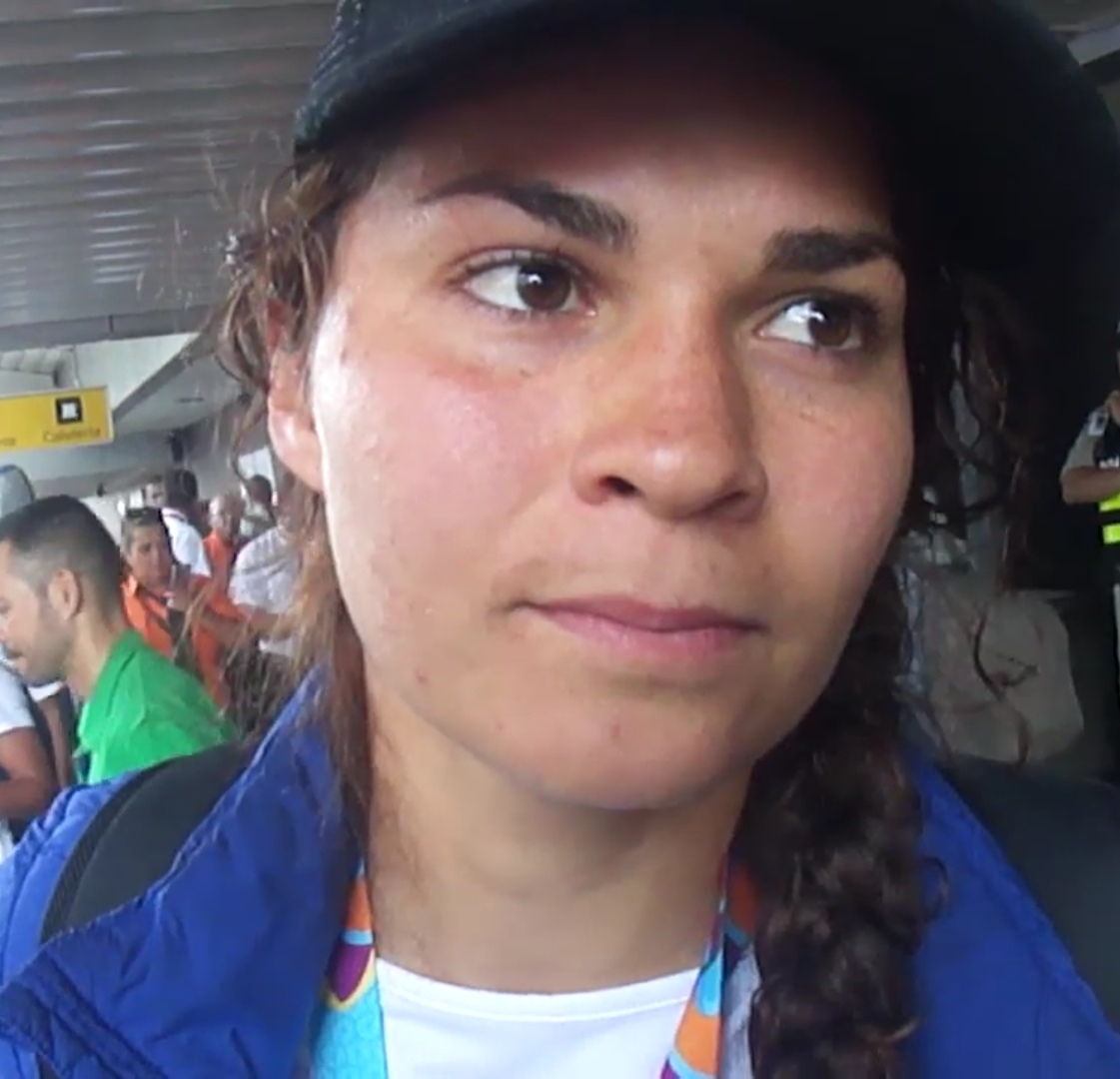
- Bermúdez in 2019

Personal information
- Full name: María Noelia Bermúdez Valverde
- Date of birth: 20 September 1994 (age 32)
- Place of birth: Quesada, Costa Rica
- Height: 1.74 m (5 ft 9 in)
- Position: Goalkeeper

Team information
- Current team: León (women)
- Number: 13

Senior career*
| Years | Team | Apps | (Gls) |
| –2015 | Deportivo Saprissa | | |
| 2016–2017 | Levante UD | 20 | (0) |
| 2017–2018 | Valencia | 2 | (0) |
| 2019–2019 | Deportivo Saprissa | | |
| 2019–2020 | Alajuelense | | |
| 2020–2021 | Deportivo La Coruña | 9 | (0) |
| 2021–2026 | Alajuelense | | |
| 2026– | León (women) | | |

International career^{‡}
| 2014 | Costa Rica U20 | 3 | (0) |
| 2014– | Costa Rica | 29 | (0) |
Medal record
Women's football
Representing Costa Rica
Pan American Games
| Bronze medal – third place | 2019 Lima | Team |
- * Club domestic league appearances and goals as of 23:29, 1 September 2016 (UTC) ‡ National team caps and goals as of 18 June 2015

María Noelia Bermúdez Valverde (born 20 September 1994), known as Noelia Bermúdez, is a Costa Rican footballer who plays as a goalkeeper for Alajuelense and the Costa Rica women's national team.

== Club career ==
Bermúdez signed for Spanish Primera División club Levante UD in January 2016. Six months and 15 league appearances later she was voted 2015–16 Goalkeeper of the Year in Spain. In 2017, Bermúdez joined Valencia CF.

== Personal life ==
Bermúdez is openly lesbian.
