= María Paula Salas =

Costa Rican footballer (born 2002)

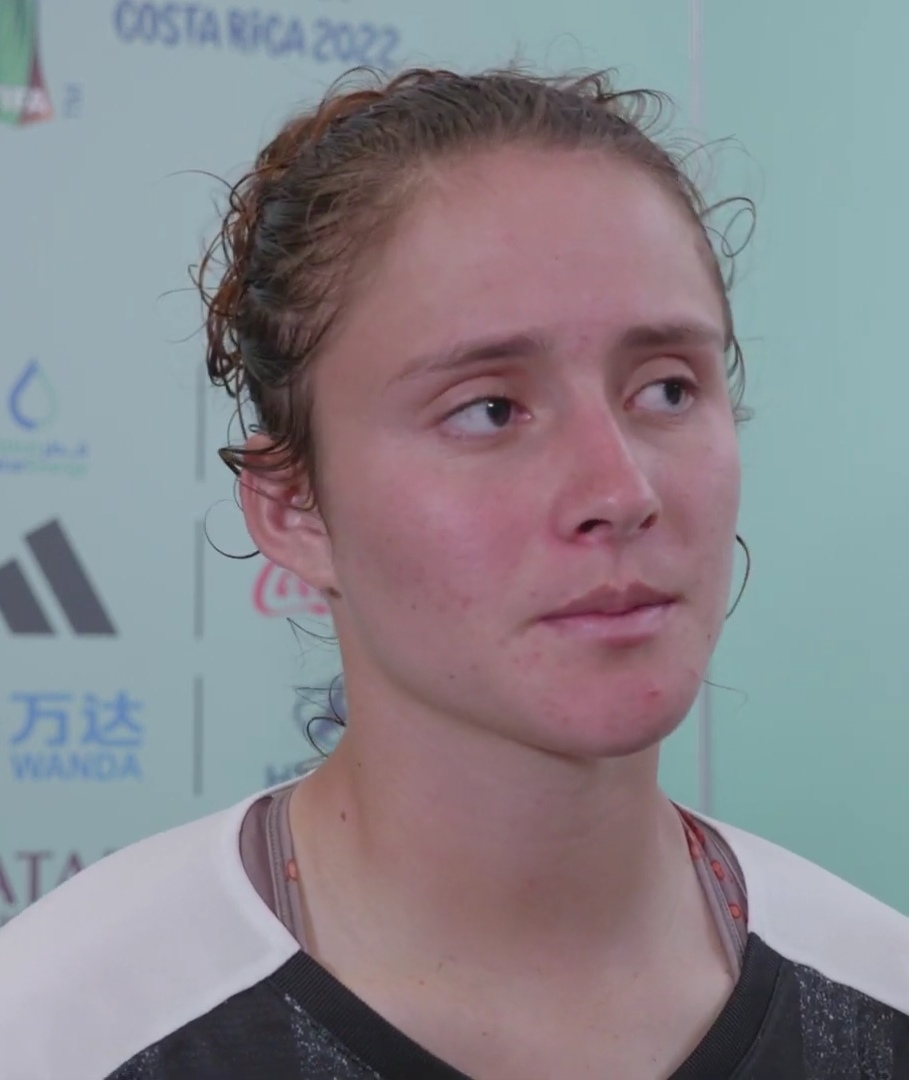
- Salas with Costa Rica U20 in 2022

Personal information
- Full name: María Paula Salas Zúñiga
- Date of birth: 12 July 2002 (age 24)
- Place of birth: San José, Costa Rica
- Height: 1.68 m (5 ft 6 in)
- Position: Forward

Senior career*
Years	Team	Apps	(Gls)
2017–2019	Saprissa FF		
2019–2022	Alajuelense FF		(28)
2022	ChievoVerona Women FM		
2022–2023	Monterrey	10	(0)
2023–2025	Atlas	50	(23)
2025–2026	Fenerbahçe	19	(15)

International career^{‡}
- Costa Rica U20
2018–	Costa Rica	9	(2)
Medal record
Women's football
Representing Costa Rica
Pan American Games
Bronze medal – third place	2019 Lima	Team
- * Club domestic league appearances and goals as of 11:59, 16 October 2025 (UTC) ‡ National team caps and goals as of 15 July 2019

María Paula Salas Zúñiga (born 12 July 2002) is a Costa Rican footballer who plays as a forward for the Costa Rica women's national team.

== Club career ==
Born in San Ramón, Salas began playing club football with Saprissa FF before transferring to Alajuelense FF in 2019. She led Alajuelense FF to the 2021 Clausura Costa Rican Women's Premier Division title by scoring a hat-trick in the club's 3–1 second leg victory (5–2 on aggregate) over Saprissa FF, capping the club's first ever undefeated championship. Salas was Alajuelense FF's all-time leading scorer with 28 goals, and had scored 70 league goals by age 19.

Salas joined ChievoVerona Women FM in January 2022, and made her Serie B Femminile debut as a second-half substitute against Palermo Women on 28 February 2022.

== International career ==
Salas appeared in two matches for Costa Rica at the 2018 CONCACAF Women's Championship.

== International goals ==
No.	Date	Venue	Opponent	Score	Result	Competition
1.	21 July 2018	Estadio Moderno Julio Torres, Barranquilla, Colombia	Jamaica	2–1	2–1	2018 Central American and Caribbean Games
2.	27 August 2018	IMG Academy, Bradenton, United States	El Salvador	11–0	11–0	2018 CONCACAF Women's Championship qualification
3.	6 August 2019	Estadio Universidad San Marcos, Lima, Peru	Colombia	3–3	3–4 (a.e.t.)	2019 Pan American Games
4.	25 June 2022	Estadio Alejandro Morera Soto, Alajuela, Costa Rica	Haiti	1–0	2–1	Friendly
5.	5 July 2022	Estadio BBVA, Guadalupe, Mexico	Panama	2–0	3–0	2022 CONCACAF W Championship
6.	4 December 2023	SKNFA Technical Center, Basseterre, St. Kitts and Nevis	Saint Kitts and Nevis	1–0	19–0	2024 CONCACAF W Gold Cup qualification
7.	4 December 2023	SKNFA Technical Center, Basseterre, St. Kitts and Nevis	Saint Kitts and Nevis	3–0	19–0	2024 CONCACAF W Gold Cup qualification
8.	4 December 2023	SKNFA Technical Center, Basseterre, St. Kitts and Nevis	Saint Kitts and Nevis	4–0	19–0	2024 CONCACAF W Gold Cup qualification
9.	4 December 2023	SKNFA Technical Center, Basseterre, St. Kitts and Nevis	Saint Kitts and Nevis	5–0	19–0	2024 CONCACAF W Gold Cup qualification
10.	4 December 2023	SKNFA Technical Center, Basseterre, St. Kitts and Nevis	Saint Kitts and Nevis	7–0	19–0	2024 CONCACAF W Gold Cup qualification
11.	4 December 2023	SKNFA Technical Center, Basseterre, St. Kitts and Nevis	Saint Kitts and Nevis	12–0	19–0	2024 CONCACAF W Gold Cup qualification
12.	4 December 2023	SKNFA Technical Center, Basseterre, St. Kitts and Nevis	Saint Kitts and Nevis	13–0	19–0	2024 CONCACAF W Gold Cup qualification
13.	6 April 2024	Estadio Alejandro Morera Soto, Alajuela, Costa Rica	Peru	2–0	5–1	Friendly
14.	6 April 2024	Estadio Alejandro Morera Soto, Alajuela, Costa Rica	Peru	3–0	5–1	Friendly
15.	27 November 2024	Estadio Andrés Quintana Roo, Cancún, Mexico	Panama	1–2	1–2	Friendly
16.	8 April 2025	Estadio Alejandro Morera Soto, Alajuela, Costa Rica	Ecuador	3–3	3–3	Friendly
17.	27 June 2025	BMO Field, Toronto, Canada	Canada	1–0	1–4	Friendly
18.	21 October 2025	Cementos Progreso Stadium, Guatemala City, Guatemala	Panama	2–1	2–1	2025 Central American Games
19.	25 October 2025	Cementos Progreso Stadium, Guatemala City, Guatemala	El Salvador	1–0	1–0	2025 Central American Games
20.	10 April 2026	Estadio Alejandro Morera Soto, Alajuela, Costa Rica	Cayman Islands	10–0	21–0	2026 CONCACAF W Championship qualification
21.	10 April 2026	Estadio Alejandro Morera Soto, Alajuela, Costa Rica	Cayman Islands	17–0	21–0	2026 CONCACAF W Championship qualification
22.	10 April 2026	Estadio Alejandro Morera Soto, Alajuela, Costa Rica	Cayman Islands	18–0	21–0	2026 CONCACAF W Championship qualification
