= Fabiola Villalobos =

Costa Rican footballer (born 1998)

Personal information
- Full name: Fabiola Villalobos Morales
- Date of birth: 13 March 1998 (age 28)
- Height: 1.65 m (5 ft 5 in)
- Position: Centre-back

Senior career*
Years	Team	Apps	(Gls)
- LD Alajuelense
2024	Tijuana	7	(1)
2025	Mazatlán	11	(1)

International career^{‡}
2018–	Costa Rica	12	(1)
- * Club domestic league appearances and goals ‡ National team caps and goals as of 15 July 2019

Fabiola Villalobos Morales (born 13 March 1998) is a Costa Rican international footballer who plays as a centre-back for LD Alajuelense and the Costa Rica women's national football team. She appeared in two matches for Costa Rica at the 2018 CONCACAF Women's Championship.
