= Priscila Chinchilla =

Costa Rican footballer (born 2001)

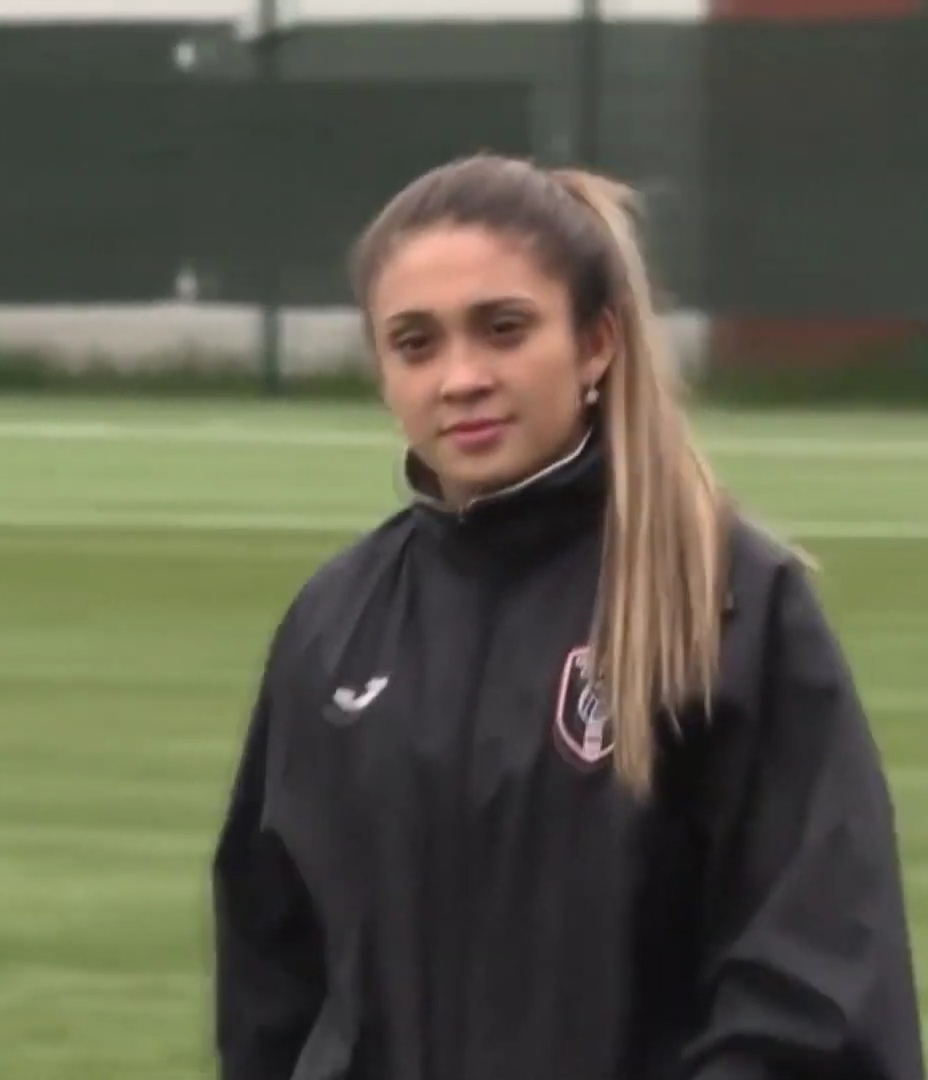
- Chinchilla with Glasgow City in 2022

Personal information
- Full name: Priscila Chinchilla Chinchilla
- Date of birth: 11 July 2001 (age 25)
- Place of birth: Pérez Zeledón, Costa Rica
- Height: 1.53 m (5 ft 0 in)
- Position: Attacking midfielder

Team information
- Current team: UNAM
- Number: 9

Senior career*
Years	Team	Apps	(Gls)
2019–2020	Alajuelense	?	(86)
2020–2023	Glasgow City	50	(42)
2023–2024	Pachuca	11	(4)
2024–2025	FC Zenit	24	(7)
2026	Atlético Madrid	0	(0)
2026–	UNAM	0	(0)

International career^{‡}
2018–	Costa Rica	43	(34)
Medal record
Women's football
Representing Costa Rica
Pan American Games
Bronze medal – third place	2019 Lima	Team
- * Club domestic league appearances and goals ‡ National team caps and goals as of 18 April 2026 (UTC)

Priscila Chinchilla (born 11 July 2001) is a Costa Rican professional footballer who plays for Liga Femenil side UNAM and the Costa Rica women's national team. She appeared in three matches for Costa Rica and scored two goals at the 2018 CONCACAF Women's U-17 Championship.

== Early life ==
Chinchilla was born in Pérez Zeledón Canton, Costa Rica, where she attended Escuela Los Ángeles until fifth grade.

== Career ==
After a stint with Arenal Coronado, Chinchilla played for AD Moravia in 2017 and CODEA Alajuela in 2018, then began her professional club career in 2019 with Liga Deportiva Alajuelense, where she scored 86 league goals.

On 21 December 2020, Chinchilla joined Scottish Women's Premier League champions Glasgow City on a two-year deal. She was named as the PFA Scotland Women's Players' Player of the Year for the 2021–22 season, the award's inaugural year.

== International goals ==
No.	Date	Venue	Opponent	Score	Result	Competition
1	11 October 2018	H-E-B Park, Edinburg, United States	Cuba	2–0	8–0	2018 CONCACAF Women's Championship
2	11 October 2018	H-E-B Park, Edinburg, United States	Cuba	6–0	8–0	2018 CONCACAF Women's Championship
3	28 July 2019	Estadio Universidad San Marcos, Lima, Peru	Panama	1–1	3–1	2019 Pan American Games
4	28 July 2019	Estadio Universidad San Marcos, Lima, Peru	Panama	3–1	3–1	2019 Pan American Games
5	1 September 2019	Pacaembu Stadium, São Paulo, Brazil	Argentina	1–0	3–1	Friendly
6	1 September 2019	Pacaembu Stadium, São Paulo, Brazil	Argentina	2–0	3–1	Friendly
7	4 October 2019	Estadio Alejandro Morera Soto, Alajuela, Costa Rica	Nicaragua	1–0	2–0	2020 CONCACAF Women's Olympic Qualifying Championship qualification
8	8 October 2019	Estadio Alejandro Morera Soto, Alajuela, Costa Rica	El Salvador	4–0	5–0	2020 CONCACAF Women's Olympic Qualifying Championship qualification
9	29 January 2020	BBVA Stadium, Houston, United States	Panama	4–1	6–1	2020 CONCACAF Women's Olympic Qualifying Championship
10	17 February 2022	Estadio Nacional, San José, Costa Rica	Saint Kitts and Nevis	2–0	7–0	2022 CONCACAF W Championship qualification
11	9 April 2022	Stadion Rignaal Jean Francisca, Willemstad, Curacao	Curaçao	3–0	4–0	2022 CONCACAF W Championship qualification
12	12 April 2022	Estadio Nacional, San José, Costa Rica	Guatemala	1–0	5–0	2022 CONCACAF W Championship qualification
13	12 April 2022	Estadio Nacional, San José, Costa Rica	Guatemala	4–0	5–0	2022 CONCACAF W Championship qualification
14	15 February 2023	Estadio León, León, Mexico	Colombia	1–0	1–1	2023 Women's Revelations Cup
15	25 September 2023	Estadio Alejandro Morera Soto, Alajuela, Costa Rica	Saint Kitts and Nevis	5–0	11–0	2024 CONCACAF W Gold Cup qualification
16	25 September 2023	Estadio Alejandro Morera Soto, Alajuela, Costa Rica	Saint Kitts and Nevis	6–0	11–0	2024 CONCACAF W Gold Cup qualification
17	25 September 2023	Estadio Alejandro Morera Soto, Alajuela, Costa Rica	Saint Kitts and Nevis	8–0	11–0	2024 CONCACAF W Gold Cup qualification
18	25 February 2024	Shell Energy Stadium, Houston, United States	El Salvador	1–0	2–0	2024 CONCACAF W Gold Cup
19	25 February 2024	Shell Energy Stadium, Houston, United States	El Salvador	2–0	2–0	2024 CONCACAF W Gold Cup
20	23 February 2025	Estadio Piedades de Santa Ana, Santa Ana, Costa Rica	New Zealand	1–0	1–1	Friendly
21	29 November 2025	Kirani James Athletic Stadium, St. George's, Grenada	Grenada	1–1	2–1	2026 CONCACAF W Championship qualification
22	29 November 2025	Kirani James Athletic Stadium, St. George's, Grenada	Grenada	2–1	2–1	2026 CONCACAF W Championship qualification
23	27 February 2026	Estadio Alejandro Morera Soto, Alajuela, Costa Rica	Brazil	1–3	2–5	Friendly
24	27 February 2026	Estadio Alejandro Morera Soto, Alajuela, Costa Rica	Brazil	2–3	2–5	Friendly
25	3 March 2026	Bermuda National Stadium, Bermuda	Bermuda	3–0	8–0	2026 CONCACAF W Championship qualification
26	3 March 2026	Bermuda National Stadium, Bermuda	Bermuda	8–0	8–0	2026 CONCACAF W Championship qualification
27	10 April 2026	Estadio Alejandro Morera Soto, Alajuela, Costa Rica	Cayman Islands	2–0	21–0	2026 CONCACAF W Championship qualification
28	10 April 2026	Estadio Alejandro Morera Soto, Alajuela, Costa Rica	Cayman Islands	8–0	21–0	2026 CONCACAF W Championship qualification
29	10 April 2026	Estadio Alejandro Morera Soto, Alajuela, Costa Rica	Cayman Islands	9–0	21–0	2026 CONCACAF W Championship qualification
30	10 April 2026	Estadio Alejandro Morera Soto, Alajuela, Costa Rica	Cayman Islands	14–0	21–0	2026 CONCACAF W Championship qualification
31	10 April 2026	Estadio Alejandro Morera Soto, Alajuela, Costa Rica	Cayman Islands	15–0	21–0	2026 CONCACAF W Championship qualification
32	10 April 2026	Estadio Alejandro Morera Soto, Alajuela, Costa Rica	Cayman Islands	18–0	21–0	2026 CONCACAF W Championship qualification
33	10 April 2026	Estadio Alejandro Morera Soto, Alajuela, Costa Rica	Cayman Islands	20–0	21–0	2026 CONCACAF W Championship qualification
34	18 April 2026	Estadio Nacional, San José, Costa Rica	Guatemala	3–0	3–0	2026 CONCACAF W Championship qualification
