= Costa Rican Women's Premier Division =

- Founded: 2001
- Country: Costa Rica
- Confederation: CONCACAF
- Level on pyramid: 1
- Relegation to: Segunda División Femenina
- Current champions: Alajuelense FF (2022)
- Most championships: Alajuelense FF (5)
- Website: uniffut.com
- Current: 2025–26 season

The Costa Rican Women's Premier Division (Spanish: Primera División Femenina de Costa Rica) is the main women's football competition in Costa Rica. It was established in 2001 and under the authority of the Women's Football Union (ADELIFE).

== Format ==
The league is played in the Apertura and Clausura format. The Apertura is played from spring to autumn, and the Clausura from autumn to spring. In each of those the top 4 finishers play a semi-final and final. After both season halves are finished, the Apertura and Clausura champion meet in a championship final to crown the champion. Should one team have won Apertura and Clausura, it is the champion without having to play a final.

== List of finals ==
The list of champions:

Costa Rica long tournaments
Year	Champion	Result	Apertura champion starting in autumn	Clausura champion starting in spring
2001	AD Desamparados			
2002	AD Desamparados			
2003	UCEM Alajuela			
2004	UCEM Alajuela	no final played	UCEM Alajuela	UCEM Alajuela
2005	CCD San José	3–2 H, 4–1 A	Cartago	CCD San José
2006	Mapache Carillo	2–0 H, 5–3 A	Mapache Carillo	Moravia
2007	CCD San José			
2008	Arenal (Coronado)			
2009	UCEM Alajuela	4–2	Arenal	UCEM Alajuela
2010	Arenal (Coronado)			
2011	Arenal Coronado	4–1 A, 3–0 H	Arenal Coronado	AD Cartago
2012	Saprissa FF			
2013	AD Moravia			
2014	Saprissa FF			
2015	Saprissa FF			
2016	AD Moravia			
2017	AD Moravia			
2018	Saprissa FF			
2019	Alajuelense/CODEA	1–1 A, 1–0 H	Saprissa FF	Alajuelense/CODEA

Costa Rica short tournaments
Year	Apertura champion starting in autumn	Finals	Clausura champion starting in spring	Finals
2020	Cancelled		Herediano	—
2021	Alajuelense	2–2 A, 1-1 H (5-4)	Alajuelense	2–1 A, 3–1 H
2022	Alajuelense	3–1 A, 1–0 H	Alajuelense	3–1 A, 1–2 H
2023	Alajuelense	1–4 A, 4–0 H		

== See also ==
- Sport in Costa Rica
  - Football in Costa Rica
    - Women's football in Costa Rica
- Costa Rica women's national football team
