= Alajuelense Fútbol Femenino =

Costa Rican women's association football club

Alajuelense Femenil
- Full name: Liga Deportiva Alajuelense Femenil
- Nicknames: Manudas, Rojinegras, Leonas
- Founded: 9 April 2019; 7 years ago
- Stadium: Estadio Alejandro Morera Soto
- Capacity: 17,895
- President: Joseph Joseph
- Sporting director: Mercedes Salas
- Manager: Wílmer López
- League: Costa Rican Women's Premier Division
- 2023 Clausura: 1st, Champions
- Website: lda.cr
Primary colours	Secondary colours	Tertiary colours

Liga Deportiva Alajuelense Femenil, also known as Alajuelense Fútbol Femenino (Alajuelense FF) and Alajuelense Femenil, is a women's football team that competes in the Costa Rican Women's Premier Division, the top division of women's football in Costa Rica. It is affiliated with men's side Liga Deportiva Alajuelense and was formed through an agreement with the Comite Cantonal de Deportes y Recreación de Alajuela (CODEA); the club first competed as Alajuelense CODEA in 2019.

As of 5 June 2023, it is the first and only club in the Costa Rican Women's Premier Division to win two undefeated championships, to win consecutive championships, or to win three or more championships.

As of 7 May 2023, IFFHS ranked the club 5th in CONCACAF and 36th in the world, the highest rankings for any club from Central America or Costa Rica. As of 2022, it was also the only club in Costa Rica to field a women's team at all levels of competition.

== History ==
Women's football in Alajuela was played as early as 15 September 1959, between clubs Independiente and ODECA at Estadio Alejandro Morera Soto. Independiente wore red shirts against ODECA, wearing blue, and won 2–0. A women's side affiliated with Alajuelense reportedly played in the 1996 Campeonato de ANAFA.

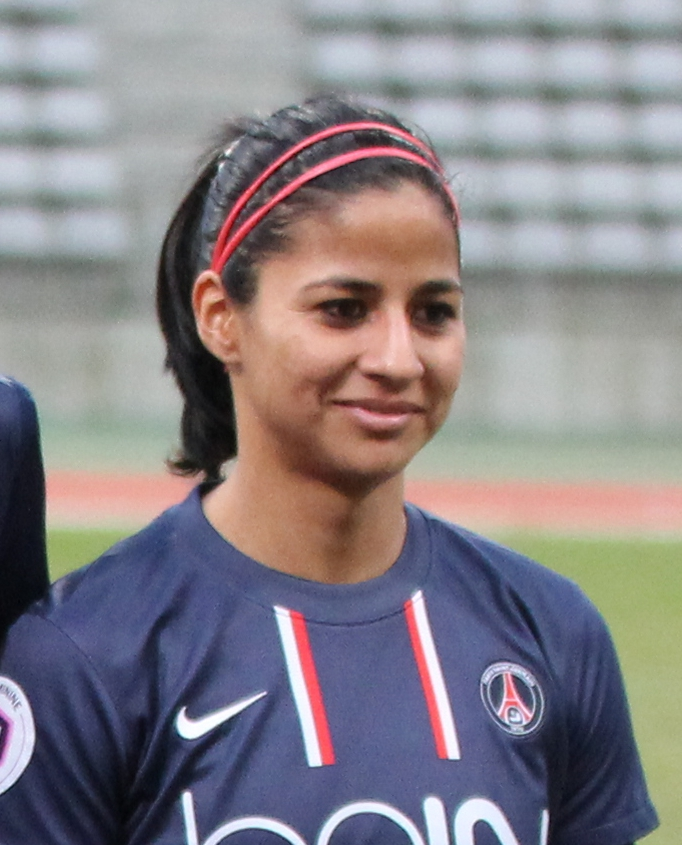
In 2019, Shirley Cruz became the first women's footballer to sign a professional contract with a Costa Rican team

=== Beginnings ===
CODEA had participated in Costa Rica's women's league in 2001, but had no relationship with Liga Deportiva Alajuelense and instead became UCEM Alajuela. In 2017, the club defeated AD Coronado to win promotion from the Segunda División, and after a year in the Premier Division signed an agreement with Liga Deportiva Alajuelense. In 2019, the team signed Costa Rican international player Shirley Cruz, who had previously played in Europe and the United States, to the first professional contract in Costa Rican women's football. Other players followed, including Fabiola Sánchez, Priscila Chinchilla, Lixy Rodríguez, Fernanda Barrantes, María Paula Salas, and Noelia Bermúdez.

On 9 December 2019 the team secured its first championship in the Primera División by winning the Torneo Clausura, qualifying it for the national final against Clásico del fútbol costarricense femenino rivals Saprissa FF. Alajuelense drew the first match of the national final 1–1 at the Estadio Ricardo Saprissa Aymá, then on 16 December 2019 won the second leg 1–0 on a goal by Priscila Chinchilla at Estadio Alejandro Morera Soto to secure the club's first national championship in its inaugural season. The second leg set a national women's club attendance record of 16,900.

=== Success and records ===
Alajuelense severed the club's affiliation with CODEA and organized its own lower divisions.

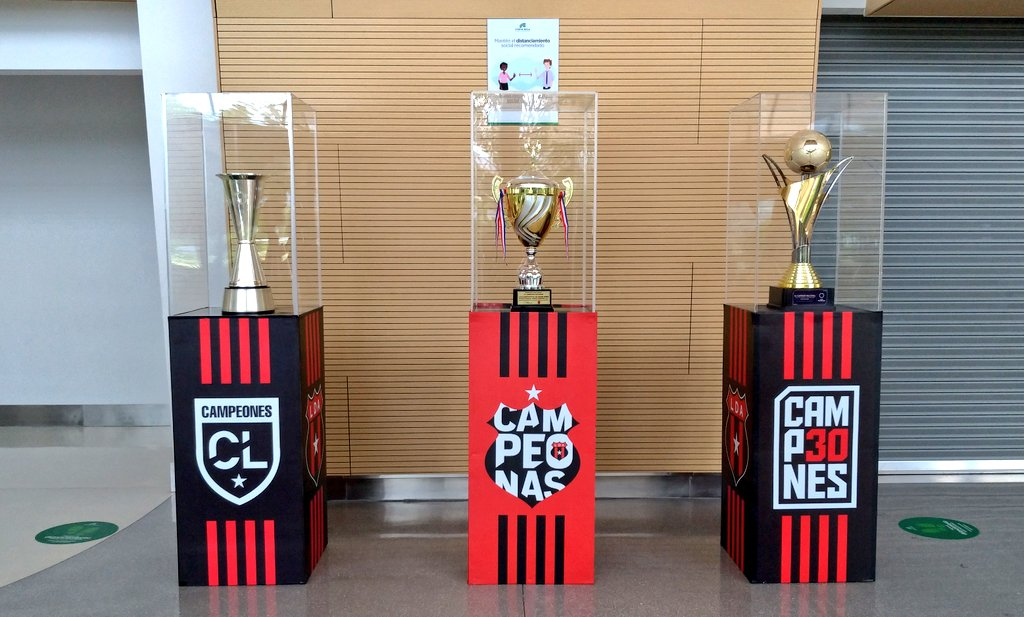
Alajuelense's 2021 Women's Torneo Apertura championship trophy, center

The newly rebranded Alajuelense team won its second championship in 2021 by winning the first phase and defeating Dimas in the two-legged semi-final, rallying from a 2–3 loss in the first leg to win 4–3 on aggregate. In the national final against Herediano, Alajuelense drew 2–2 on goals by Kenia Rangel and Marta Cox, drew in regulation of the second leg 1–1 on a goal by Sianyf Agüero, and failed to separate after extra time. In the penalty shoot-out to decide the championship, Alajuelense won 5–4. Cox won the championship's Golden Boot award as top goalscorer and also registered the most assists.

The team won its third championship in the 2021 Torneo Clausura in historic fashion, becoming the first club in Costa Rican women's soccer to complete an undefeated season, winning 16 of 18 matches and drawing twice. Alajuelense defeated Herediano again in the national championship semi-finals, then defeated Saprissa in the finals 5–2 on aggregate, with Paula Salas completing a hat-trick in the second leg. The club ended 2021 by winning the Super Copa 5–1 against Saprissa FF.

The team then won the 2022 Torneo Apertura, becoming the first to win consecutive tournaments with undefeated seasons and the first to win three championships. The two undefeated seasons and championships totalled 39 matches without a loss. Alajuelense defeated Sporting F.C. in the national championship semi-finals before defeating Saprissa once again in the finals, 4–1 on aggregate.

==== International success ====
In September 2022 Alajuelense won its first international title by defeating Saprissa 1–0 in the finals of the Torneo Interclubes Femenino Uncaf Fifa Forward 2022. Alajuelense became the first club to win the tournament with a perfect record, scoring 28 total goals. The trophy was Alajuelense's sixth, setting a record for most total cups won by a Costa Rican women's club.

==== Fourth championship ====
In December 2022 Alajuelense won its fourth championship by defeating Sporting F.C. Despite suffering its first loss in a national championship series, the team rallied to win 4–3 on aggregate.

==== Fifth championship ====
In June 2023 Alajuelense won its sixth championship by defeating Sporting F.C. again in the Torneo Apertura finals, but did so after falling behind three goals in the first leg by losing 1–4. In the second leg, expected to be captain Shirley Cruz's final match for the team before retirement, the team rallied to win 4–0 and defeat Sporting 5–4 on aggregate. Natalia Mills scored the championship-winning goal.

== Stadium ==
The team plays in Estadio Alejandro Morera Soto, the home stadium of Liga Deportiva Alajuelense. The team also plays at the High Performance Center stadium in Turrúcares. The team's previous home ground was the Monserrat Sports Center in the Río Segundo District of Alajuela.

== Records ==
=== Year-by-year ===
As of 3 June 2023.

Seasons of Liga Deportiva Alajuelense Femenil
Edition	Result	Apertura	Clausura	MP	W	D	L	GF	GA	Pts.	Per.	Copa / S. Copa	Top goalscorer	GS	Manager
2018 (Note: As CODEA)	4th	3rd	5th	28	14	6	8	70	48	48	57%	–	(Costa Rica) Priscila Chinchilla	24	(Costa Rica) Edgar Rodríguez Carranza
2019 (Note: As Alajulenese CODEA)	Champions	3rd	1st	36	25	3	8	110	45	78	72%	–	(Costa Rica) Priscila Chinchilla	33	(Costa Rica) Edgar Rodríguez Carranza

Tournaments of Liga Deportiva Alajuelense Femenil
Edition	Result	Pos.	MP	W	D	L	GF	GA	Pts.	Per.	Copa / S. Copa	Top goalscorer	GS	Manager
Apertura 2020	Abandoned	1st (Note: First phase)	3	3	0	0	8	0	9	100%	–	(Costa Rica) María Paula Salas	3	(Costa Rica) Edgar Rodríguez Carranza
2020	3rd	3rd	20	12	2	6	52	20	38	63%	–	(Costa Rica) Priscila Chinchilla	12	(Costa Rica) Edgar Rodríguez Carranza (Costa Rica) Wilmer López
Apertura 2021	Champions	1st	18	10	4	4	40	17	34	63%	–	(Panama) Marta Cox	9	(Costa Rica) Wilmer López
Clausura 2021	Champions	1st	18	16	2	0	58	13	50	93%	Champions (Note: Super Cup)	(Costa Rica) Fernanda Barrantes	10	(Costa Rica) Wilmer López
Apertura 2022	Champions	1st	18	14	4	0	57	10	46	85%	3rd (Note: Cup)	(United States) Mia Corbin	15	(Costa Rica) Wilmer López
Clausura 2022	Champions	3rd	18	12	1	5	42	29	37	68%	Runners-up	(United States) Mia Corbin	17	(Costa Rica) Wilmer López
Apertura 2023	Champions	1st	16	13	2	3	57	15	40	83%	–	(Panama) Kenia Rangel (Panama) Natalia Mills	8	(Costa Rica) Wilmer López

== Honors ==
Championships won by Alajuelense Femenil:

=== International ===
- UNCAF Women's Interclub Championship (3): 2022, 2023, 2025

=== National ===
- Costa Rican Women's Premier Division (7): 2019, 2021 Apertura, 2021 Clausura, 2022 Apertura, 2022 Clausura, 2023 Apertura, 2023 Clausura
- Short Championship (1): 2019 Clausura
- Super Copa Costa Rica (2): 2021, 2023

== Managers ==
Primera División managers:

- (Costa Rica) Edgar Rodríguez Carranza (2019–2020)
- (Costa Rica) Wilmer López (2020—)

== Players ==
=== Current squad ===
As of 19 July 2025.

Note: Flags indicate national team as defined under FIFA eligibility rules; some limited exceptions apply. Players may hold more than one non-FIFA nationality.

No.	Pos.	Nation	Player
1	GK	CRC	Noelia Bermúdez
2	FW	CRC	Yoanka Villanueva
3	DF	CRC	Gabriela Guillén
5	DF	CRC	Keilyn Gómez
7	MF	CRC	Viviana Chinchilla
8	MF	CRC	Mariela Campos
9		CRC	Anna
11	FW	PAN	Kenia Rangel
12	DF	CRC	Katherine Arroyo
16	DF	CRC	Marilenis Oporta

No.	Pos.	Nation	Player
18	MF	CRC	Emilie Valenciano (C)
19	FW	CRC	Angela Mesén
20	MF	CRC	Alexandra Pinell
21	DF	CRC	Valery Sandoval
22	GK	CRC	Dayana Pérez
25	MF	CRC	Sianyf Agüero
26	FW	CRC	Wyzangel López
35	MF	CRC	María Paula Arce
55	DF	CRC	Fabiola Villalobos
99	FW	CRC	Sofía Varela

== See also ==
- Liga Deportiva Alajuelense
- Costa Rican Women's Premier Division
