= 2023 FIFA Women's World Cup squads =

List of squads of the 2023 FIFA Women's World Cup

The 2023 FIFA Women's World Cup was an international women's association football tournament held in Australia and New Zealand from 20 July to 20 August 2023. The 32 national teams involved in the tournament were required to register a squad of 23 players, including three goalkeepers. Only players in these squads were eligible to take part in the tournament.

A provisional list of between 35 and 55 players per national team was submitted to FIFA, who did not publish it. From the preliminary squad, the final list of 23 players per national team needed to be submitted to FIFA by 9 July 2023. FIFA published the final lists with squad numbers on their website on 11 July. Teams were permitted to make late replacements in the event of serious injury, at any time up to 24 hours before their first match, where the replacement players did not need to be in the preliminary squad.

The age listed for each player is on 20 July 2023, the first day of the tournament. The numbers of caps and goals listed for each player do not include any matches played after the start of the tournament. The club listed is the club for which the player last played a competitive match prior to the tournament. A flag is included for coaches who are of a different nationality than their own national team.

== Group A ==
=== New Zealand ===
Head coach: (Czech Republic) Jitka Klimková

The final 23-player squad was announced on 30 June 2023. Additionally, Ava Collins, Meikayla Moore, and Kate Taylor were named as reserve players. The following week, Moore declined to join the squad as a reserve player and Grace Wisnewski was called up as a reserve player instead of her.

No.	Pos.	Player	Date of birth (age)	Caps	Goals	Club
1	GK	Erin Nayler	17 April 1992 (aged 31)	84	0	(Swedish Football Association) IFK Norrköping
2	MF	Ria Percival (vice-captain)	7 December 1989 (aged 33)	163	15	(The Football Association) Tottenham Hotspur
3	DF	Claudia Bunge	21 September 1999 (aged 23)	22	0	(Football Australia) Melbourne Victory
4	DF	CJ Bott	22 April 1995 (aged 28)	38	3	(The Football Association) Leicester City
5	DF	Michaela Foster	9 January 1999 (aged 24)	6	0	(New Zealand Football) Wellington Phoenix
6	MF	Malia Steinmetz	18 January 1999 (aged 24)	20	0	(Football Australia) Western Sydney Wanderers
7	DF	Ali Riley (captain)	30 October 1987 (aged 35)	154	2	(United States Soccer Federation) Angel City
8	MF	Daisy Cleverley	30 April 1997 (aged 26)	31	2	(Danish Football Association) HB Køge
9	FW	Gabi Rennie	7 July 2001 (aged 22)	26	2	(United States Soccer Federation) Arizona State Sun Devils
10	MF	Annalie Longo	1 July 1991 (aged 32)	129	15	(New Zealand Football) Christchurch United
11	MF	Olivia Chance	5 October 1993 (aged 29)	45	2	(Scottish Football Association) Celtic
12	MF	Betsy Hassett	4 August 1990 (aged 32)	145	13	(New Zealand Football) Wellington Phoenix
13	DF	Rebekah Stott	17 June 1993 (aged 30)	90	4	(The Football Association) Brighton & Hove Albion
14	DF	Katie Bowen	15 April 1994 (aged 29)	94	3	(Football Australia) Melbourne City
15	FW	Paige Satchell	13 April 1998 (aged 25)	43	2	(New Zealand Football) Wellington Phoenix
16	FW	Jacqui Hand	19 February 1999 (aged 24)	14	2	(Football Association of Finland) Åland United
17	FW	Hannah Wilkinson	28 May 1992 (aged 31)	115	28	(Football Australia) Melbourne City
18	FW	Grace Jale	10 April 1999 (aged 24)	17	2	(Football Australia) Canberra United
19	DF	Elizabeth Anton	12 December 1998 (aged 24)	19	0	(Football Australia) Perth Glory
20	FW	Indiah-Paige Riley	20 December 2001 (aged 21)	9	0	(Football Australia) Brisbane Roar
21	GK	Victoria Esson	6 March 1991 (aged 32)	16	0	(Scottish Football Association) Rangers
22	FW	Milly Clegg	1 November 2005 (aged 17)	4	0	(New Zealand Football) Wellington Phoenix
23	GK	Anna Leat	26 June 2001 (aged 22)	10	0	(The Football Association) Aston Villa

=== Norway ===
Head coach: Hege Riise

The final 23-player squad was announced on 19 June 2023. Additionally, Elisabeth Terland, Emma Stølen Godø, and Malin Brenn were named as reserve players.

No.	Pos.	Player	Date of birth (age)	Caps	Goals	Club
1	GK	Cecilie Fiskerstrand	20 March 1996 (aged 27)	44	0	(Norwegian Football Federation) Lillestrøm
2	DF	Anja Sønstevold	21 June 1992 (aged 31)	28	1	(Italian Football Federation) Inter Milan
3	DF	Sara Hørte	24 November 2000 (aged 22)	4	1	(Norwegian Football Federation) Rosenborg
4	DF	Tuva Hansen	4 August 1997 (aged 25)	27	1	(German Football Association) Bayern Munich
5	DF	Guro Bergsvand	3 March 1994 (aged 29)	22	4	(The Football Association) Brighton & Hove Albion
6	DF	Maren Mjelde (captain)	6 November 1989 (aged 33)	165	20	(The Football Association) Chelsea
7	MF	Ingrid Syrstad Engen	29 April 1998 (aged 25)	59	6	(Royal Spanish Football Federation) Barcelona
8	MF	Vilde Bøe Risa	13 July 1995 (aged 28)	60	2	(The Football Association) Manchester United
9	FW	Karina Sævik	24 March 1996 (aged 27)	38	6	(Norwegian Football Federation) Vålerenga
10	MF	Caroline Graham Hansen	18 February 1995 (aged 28)	98	44	(Royal Spanish Football Federation) Barcelona
11	MF	Guro Reiten	26 July 1994 (aged 28)	80	17	(The Football Association) Chelsea
12	GK	Guro Pettersen	22 August 1991 (aged 31)	7	0	(Norwegian Football Federation) Vålerenga
13	MF	Thea Bjelde	5 June 2000 (aged 23)	7	0	(Norwegian Football Federation) Vålerenga
14	FW	Ada Hegerberg	10 July 1995 (aged 28)	76	43	(French Football Federation) Lyon
15	MF	Amalie Eikeland	26 August 1995 (aged 27)	45	3	(The Football Association) Reading
16	DF	Mathilde Harviken	29 December 2001 (aged 21)	9	0	(Norwegian Football Federation) Rosenborg
17	FW	Julie Blakstad	27 August 2001 (aged 21)	29	3	(Swedish Football Association) BK Häcken
18	MF	Frida Maanum	16 July 1999 (aged 24)	65	11	(The Football Association) Arsenal
19	DF	Marit Bratberg Lund	7 November 1997 (aged 25)	5	0	(Norwegian Football Federation) Brann
20	MF	Emilie Haavi	16 June 1992 (aged 31)	97	16	(Italian Football Federation) Roma
21	FW	Anna Jøsendal	29 April 2001 (aged 22)	8	0	(Norwegian Football Federation) Rosenborg
22	FW	Sophie Román Haug	4 June 1999 (aged 24)	8	5	(Italian Football Federation) Roma
23	GK	Aurora Mikalsen	21 March 1996 (aged 27)	9	0	(Norwegian Football Federation) Brann

=== Philippines ===
Head coach: (Australia) Alen Stajcic

An initial 29-player preliminary squad was named on 10 June 2023. The final 23-player squad was announced on 9 July 2023. Inna Palacios, Isabella Pasion, and Maya Alcantara were listed as reserve players.

Notably, only two of the 23 squad members were born in the Philippines; 18 were born in the United States.

No.	Pos.	Player	Date of birth (age)	Caps	Goals	Club
1	GK	Olivia McDaniel	14 October 1997 (aged 25)	28	0	(United States Soccer Federation) So Cal Union
2	DF	Malea Cesar	9 December 2003 (aged 19)	30	1	(Football Australia) Blacktown City
3	DF	Jessika Cowart	30 October 1999 (aged 23)	18	2	(Swedish Football Association) IFK Kalmar
4	MF	Jaclyn Sawicki	14 November 1992 (aged 30)	20	0	(Football Australia) Western United
5	DF	Hali Long	21 January 1995 (aged 28)	73	18	(Philippine Football Federation) Kaya–Iloilo
6	MF	Tahnai Annis (captain)	20 June 1989 (aged 34)	37	14	(Football Association of Iceland) Þór/KA
7	FW	Sarina Bolden	30 June 1996 (aged 27)	36	21	(Football Australia) Western Sydney Wanderers
8	MF	Sara Eggesvik	29 April 1997 (aged 26)	21	3	(Norwegian Football Federation) KIL/Hemne
9	FW	Isabella Flanigan	22 February 2005 (aged 18)	27	3	(United States Soccer Federation) West Virginia Mountaineers
10	FW	Chandler McDaniel	4 February 1998 (aged 25)	13	5	(United States Soccer Federation) So Cal Union
11	MF	Anicka Castañeda	15 December 1999 (aged 23)	38	11	(Football Australia) Mt Druitt Town Rangers
12	MF	Ryley Bugay	23 January 1996 (aged 27)	21	0	Unattached
13	DF	Angela Beard	16 August 1997 (aged 25)	0	0	(Football Australia) Western United
14	FW	Meryll Serrano	20 July 1997 (aged 26)	8	4	(Norwegian Football Federation) Stabæk
15	FW	Carleigh Frilles	11 April 2002 (aged 21)	36	12	(Football Australia) Blacktown Spartans
16	DF	Sofia Harrison	16 February 1999 (aged 24)	34	3	Unattached
17	DF	Alicia Barker	22 May 1998 (aged 25)	10	0	(United States Soccer Federation) Pacific Northwest SC
18	GK	Kaiya Jota	5 February 2006 (aged 17)	1	0	(United States Soccer Federation) Los Angeles Breakers
19	DF	Dominique Randle	10 December 1994 (aged 28)	25	1	(Football Association of Iceland) Þór/KA
20	MF	Quinley Quezada	7 April 1997 (aged 26)	48	22	(Football Association of Serbia) Red Star Belgrade
21	FW	Katrina Guillou	19 December 1993 (aged 29)	24	10	(Swedish Football Association) Piteå
22	GK	Kiara Fontanilla	1 July 2000 (aged 23)	9	0	(Football Australia) Central Coast Mariners
23	DF	Reina Bonta	17 April 1999 (aged 24)	11	0	(Brazilian Football Confederation) Santos

=== Switzerland ===
Head coach: (Germany) Inka Grings

The final squad was named on 3 July 2023. The following day, Iman Beney ruptured her anterior cruciate ligament in training and was replaced by Amira Arfaoui.

No.	Pos.	Player	Date of birth (age)	Caps	Goals	Club
1	GK	Gaëlle Thalmann	18 January 1986 (aged 37)	104	0	(Royal Spanish Football Federation) Real Betis
2	DF	Julia Stierli	3 April 1997 (aged 26)	27	1	(Swiss Football Association) Zürich
3	DF	Lara Marti	21 September 1999 (aged 23)	11	0	(German Football Association) Bayer Leverkusen
4	DF	Laura Felber	17 August 2001 (aged 21)	1	0	(Swiss Football Association) Servette
5	DF	Noelle Maritz	23 December 1995 (aged 27)	102	2	(The Football Association) Arsenal
6	MF	Géraldine Reuteler	21 April 1999 (aged 24)	53	11	(German Football Association) Eintracht Frankfurt
7	FW	Amira Arfaoui	8 August 1999 (aged 23)	1	0	(German Football Association) Bayer Leverkusen
8	DF	Nadine Riesen	11 April 2000 (aged 23)	7	0	(Swiss Football Association) Zürich
9	FW	Ana-Maria Crnogorčević	3 October 1990 (aged 32)	145	70	(Royal Spanish Football Federation) Barcelona
10	FW	Ramona Bachmann	25 December 1990 (aged 32)	131	57	(French Football Federation) Paris Saint-Germain
11	MF	Coumba Sow	27 August 1994 (aged 28)	34	13	(Swiss Football Association) Servette
12	GK	Livia Peng	14 March 2002 (aged 21)	2	0	(Royal Spanish Football Federation) Levante
13	MF	Lia Wälti (captain)	19 April 1993 (aged 30)	108	5	(The Football Association) Arsenal
14	MF	Marion Rey	21 March 1999 (aged 24)	4	0	(Swiss Football Association) Zürich
15	DF	Luana Bühler	28 April 1996 (aged 27)	38	1	(German Football Association) 1899 Hoffenheim
16	MF	Sandrine Gaillard	19 December 1996 (aged 26)	31	2	(Swiss Football Association) Servette
17	MF	Seraina Piubel	2 June 2000 (aged 23)	5	1	(Swiss Football Association) Zürich
18	DF	Viola Calligaris	17 March 1996 (aged 27)	43	5	(Royal Spanish Football Federation) Levante
19	DF	Eseosa Aigbogun	23 May 1993 (aged 30)	81	3	(French Football Federation) Paris FC
20	FW	Fabienne Humm	20 December 1986 (aged 36)	78	25	(Swiss Football Association) Zürich
21	GK	Seraina Friedli	20 March 1993 (aged 30)	10	0	(Swiss Football Association) Zürich
22	FW	Meriame Terchoun	27 October 1995 (aged 27)	20	2	(French Football Federation) Dijon
23	FW	Alisha Lehmann	21 January 1999 (aged 24)	37	6	(The Football Association) Aston Villa

== Group B ==
=== Australia ===
Head coach: (Sweden) Tony Gustavsson

A 29-player preliminary squad was announced on 19 June 2023. The final 23-player squad was announced on 3 July 2023.

No.	Pos.	Player	Date of birth (age)	Caps	Goals	Club
1	GK	Lydia Williams	13 May 1988 (aged 35)	102	0	(The Football Association) Brighton & Hove Albion
2	DF	Courtney Nevin	12 February 2002 (aged 21)	23	0	(The Football Association) Leicester City
3	DF	Aivi Luik	18 March 1985 (aged 38)	43	1	(Swedish Football Association) BK Häcken
4	DF	Clare Polkinghorne	1 February 1989 (aged 34)	157	16	(Swedish Football Association) Vittsjö GIK
5	FW	Cortnee Vine	9 April 1998 (aged 25)	17	3	(Football Australia) Sydney FC
6	MF	Clare Wheeler	14 January 1998 (aged 25)	14	0	(The Football Association) Everton
7	DF	Steph Catley (vice-captain)	26 January 1994 (aged 29)	110	3	(The Football Association) Arsenal
8	MF	Alex Chidiac	15 January 1999 (aged 24)	27	2	(United States Soccer Federation) Racing Louisville
9	FW	Caitlin Foord	11 November 1994 (aged 28)	109	29	(The Football Association) Arsenal
10	MF	Emily van Egmond	12 July 1993 (aged 30)	128	30	(United States Soccer Federation) San Diego Wave
11	FW	Mary Fowler	14 February 2003 (aged 20)	37	10	(The Football Association) Manchester City
12	GK	Teagan Micah	20 October 1997 (aged 25)	14	0	(Swedish Football Association) Rosengård
13	MF	Tameka Yallop	16 June 1991 (aged 32)	113	12	(Norwegian Football Federation) Brann
14	DF	Alanna Kennedy	21 January 1995 (aged 28)	109	8	(The Football Association) Manchester City
15	DF	Clare Hunt	12 March 1999 (aged 24)	6	0	(Football Australia) Western Sydney Wanderers
16	FW	Hayley Raso	5 September 1994 (aged 28)	71	12	(The Football Association) Manchester City
17	FW	Kyah Simon	25 June 1991 (aged 32)	111	29	(The Football Association) Tottenham Hotspur
18	GK	Mackenzie Arnold	25 February 1994 (aged 29)	35	0	(The Football Association) West Ham United
19	MF	Katrina Gorry	13 August 1992 (aged 30)	94	17	(Swedish Football Association) Vittsjö GIK
20	FW	Sam Kerr (captain)	10 September 1993 (aged 29)	121	63	(The Football Association) Chelsea
21	DF	Ellie Carpenter	28 April 2000 (aged 23)	62	3	(French Football Federation) Lyon
22	DF	Charli Grant	20 September 2001 (aged 21)	18	1	(Swedish Football Association) Vittsjö GIK
23	MF	Kyra Cooney-Cross	15 February 2002 (aged 21)	28	0	(Swedish Football Association) Hammarby IF

=== Canada ===
Head coach: (England) Bev Priestman

A 25-player preliminary roster was announced on 8 June 2023. The final 23-player roster was announced on 9 July 2023.

No.	Pos.	Player	Date of birth (age)	Caps	Goals	Club
1	GK	Kailen Sheridan	16 July 1995 (aged 28)	35	0	(United States Soccer Federation) San Diego Wave
2	DF	Allysha Chapman	25 January 1989 (aged 34)	96	2	(United States Soccer Federation) Houston Dash
3	DF	Kadeisha Buchanan	5 November 1995 (aged 27)	131	4	(The Football Association) Chelsea
4	DF	Shelina Zadorsky	24 October 1992 (aged 30)	89	4	(The Football Association) Tottenham Hotspur
5	MF	Quinn	11 August 1995 (aged 27)	89	5	(United States Soccer Federation) OL Reign
6	FW	Deanne Rose	3 March 1999 (aged 24)	73	10	(The Football Association) Reading
7	MF	Julia Grosso	29 August 2000 (aged 22)	50	3	(Italian Football Federation) Juventus
8	DF	Jayde Riviere	22 January 2001 (aged 22)	37	1	(The Football Association) Manchester United
9	FW	Jordyn Huitema	8 May 2001 (aged 22)	64	16	(United States Soccer Federation) OL Reign
10	DF	Ashley Lawrence	11 June 1995 (aged 28)	117	8	(French Football Federation) Paris Saint-Germain
11	FW	Evelyne Viens	6 February 1997 (aged 26)	18	4	(Swedish Football Association) Kristianstads DFF
12	FW	Christine Sinclair (captain)	12 June 1983 (aged 40)	323	190	(United States Soccer Federation) Portland Thorns
13	MF	Sophie Schmidt	28 June 1988 (aged 35)	221	20	(United States Soccer Federation) Houston Dash
14	DF	Vanessa Gilles	11 March 1996 (aged 27)	25	3	(French Football Federation) Lyon
15	FW	Nichelle Prince	19 February 1995 (aged 28)	90	13	(United States Soccer Federation) Houston Dash
16	DF	Gabrielle Carle	12 October 1998 (aged 24)	36	1	(United States Soccer Federation) Washington Spirit
17	MF	Jessie Fleming	11 March 1998 (aged 25)	115	19	(The Football Association) Chelsea
18	GK	Sabrina D'Angelo	11 May 1993 (aged 30)	13	0	(The Football Association) Arsenal
19	FW	Adriana Leon	2 October 1992 (aged 30)	96	28	(The Football Association) Manchester United
20	FW	Cloé Lacasse	7 July 1993 (aged 30)	19	1	(Portuguese Football Federation) Benfica
21	MF	Simi Awujo	23 September 2003 (aged 19)	6	0	(United States Soccer Federation) USC Trojans
22	GK	Lysianne Proulx	17 April 1999 (aged 24)	0	0	(Portuguese Football Federation) Torreense
23	MF	Olivia Smith	5 August 2004 (aged 18)	2	0	(United States Soccer Federation) Penn State Nittany Lions

=== Nigeria ===
Head coach: (United States) Randy Waldrum

The final 23-player squad was announced on 16 June 2023.

No.	Pos.	Player	Date of birth (age)	Caps	Goals	Club
1	GK	Tochukwu Oluehi	2 May 1987 (aged 36)			(Turkish Football Federation) Hakkarigücü Spor
2	DF	Ashleigh Plumptre	8 May 1998 (aged 25)	11	0	unattached
3	DF	Osinachi Ohale	21 December 1991 (aged 31)	59	2	(Royal Spanish Football Federation) Alavés
4	DF	Glory Ogbonna	25 December 1998 (aged 24)	22	0	(Turkish Football Federation) Beşiktaş
5	DF	Onome Ebi (captain)	8 May 1983 (aged 40)	107	3	(Nigeria Football Federation) Abia Angels
6	FW	Ifeoma Onumonu	25 February 1994 (aged 29)	14	4	(United States Soccer Federation) NJ/NY Gotham FC
7	MF	Toni Payne	22 April 1995 (aged 28)	23	1	(Royal Spanish Football Federation) Sevilla
8	FW	Asisat Oshoala	9 October 1994 (aged 28)	41	30	(Royal Spanish Football Federation) Barcelona
9	FW	Desire Oparanozie	17 December 1993 (aged 29)	38	23	(Chinese Football Association) Wuhan Jianghan University
10	MF	Christy Ucheibe	25 December 2000 (aged 22)	10	1	(Portuguese Football Federation) Benfica
11	FW	Gift Monday	9 December 2001 (aged 21)	12	2	(Royal Spanish Football Federation) Granadilla Tenerife
12	FW	Uchenna Kanu	20 June 1997 (aged 26)	18	6	(United States Soccer Federation) Racing Louisville
13	MF	Deborah Abiodun	2 November 2003 (aged 19)	3	0	(Nigeria Football Federation) Rivers Angels
14	DF	Oluwatosin Demehin	13 March 2002 (aged 21)	8	0	(French Football Federation) Reims
15	MF	Rasheedat Ajibade	8 December 1999 (aged 23)	26	9	(Royal Spanish Football Federation) Atlético Madrid
16	GK	Chiamaka Nnadozie	8 December 2000 (aged 22)	19	0	(French Football Federation) Paris FC
17	FW	Francisca Ordega	19 October 1993 (aged 29)	34	7	(Russian Football Union) CSKA Moscow
18	MF	Halimatu Ayinde	16 May 1995 (aged 28)	12	0	(Swedish Football Association) Rosengård
19	MF	Jennifer Echegini	22 March 2001 (aged 22)	6	1	(United States Soccer Federation) Florida State Seminoles
20	DF	Rofiat Imuran	17 June 2004 (aged 19)	7	0	(French Football Federation) Reims
21	FW	Esther Okoronkwo	27 March 1997 (aged 26)	9	3	(French Football Federation) Saint-Étienne
22	DF	Michelle Alozie	28 April 1997 (aged 26)	21	1	(United States Soccer Federation) Houston Dash
23	GK	Yewande Balogun	28 September 1989 (aged 33)	1	0	(French Football Federation) Saint-Étienne

=== Republic of Ireland ===
Head coach: (Netherlands) Vera Pauw

A 31-player preliminary squad was announced on 9 June. The final 23-player squad was announced on 28 June 2023, with Sophie Whitehouse, Harriet Scott, and Jamie Finn being named as reserve players.

No.	Pos.	Player	Date of birth (age)	Caps	Goals	Club
1	GK	Courtney Brosnan	10 November 1995 (aged 27)	21	0	(The Football Association) Everton
2	DF	Claire O'Riordan	12 October 1994 (aged 28)	17	0	(Scottish Football Association) Celtic
3	DF	Chloe Mustaki	29 July 1995 (aged 27)	5	0	(The Football Association) Bristol City
4	DF	Louise Quinn	17 June 1990 (aged 33)	103	15	(The Football Association) Birmingham City
5	DF	Niamh Fahey	13 October 1987 (aged 35)	106	1	(The Football Association) Liverpool
6	MF	Megan Connolly	7 March 1997 (aged 26)	38	4	(The Football Association) Brighton & Hove Albion
7	DF	Diane Caldwell	11 September 1988 (aged 34)	95	3	(The Football Association) Reading
8	MF	Ruesha Littlejohn	3 July 1990 (aged 33)	71	6	(The Football Association) Aston Villa
9	FW	Amber Barrett	16 January 1996 (aged 27)	35	5	(German Football Association) Turbine Potsdam
10	MF	Denise O'Sullivan	4 February 1994 (aged 29)	101	19	(United States Soccer Federation) North Carolina Courage
11	MF	Katie McCabe (captain)	21 September 1995 (aged 27)	72	18	(The Football Association) Arsenal
12	MF	Lily Agg	17 December 1993 (aged 29)	7	2	(The Football Association) London City Lionesses
13	DF	Áine O'Gorman	13 May 1989 (aged 34)	117	13	(Football Association of Ireland) Shamrock Rovers
14	DF	Heather Payne	26 January 2000 (aged 23)	34	1	(United States Soccer Federation) Florida State Seminoles
15	MF	Lucy Quinn	29 September 1993 (aged 29)	13	2	(The Football Association) Birmingham City
16	GK	Grace Moloney	1 March 1993 (aged 30)	6	0	(The Football Association) Reading
17	MF	Sinead Farrelly	16 November 1989 (aged 33)	1	0	(United States Soccer Federation) NJ/NY Gotham FC
18	FW	Kyra Carusa	14 November 1995 (aged 27)	11	2	(The Football Association) London City Lionesses
19	FW	Abbie Larkin	27 April 2005 (aged 18)	6	1	(Football Association of Ireland) Shamrock Rovers
20	FW	Marissa Sheva	22 April 1997 (aged 26)	3	0	(United States Soccer Federation) Washington Spirit
21	MF	Ciara Grant	11 June 1993 (aged 30)	17	0	(Scottish Football Association) Hearts
22	DF	Isibeal Atkinson	17 July 2001 (aged 22)	4	0	(The Football Association) West Ham United
23	GK	Megan Walsh	12 November 1994 (aged 28)	1	0	(The Football Association) Brighton & Hove Albion

== Group C ==
=== Costa Rica ===
Head coach: Amelia Valverde

A 30-player preliminary squad was announced on 7 June 2023. The final 23-player squad was announced on 6 July 2023.

No.	Pos.	Player	Date of birth (age)	Caps	Goals	Club
1	GK	Génesis Pérez	4 May 2005 (aged 18)			(United States Soccer Federation) UCF Knights
2	DF	Gabriela Guillén	1 March 1992 (aged 31)			(Football Association of Iceland) Þór/KA
3	DF	María Coto	2 March 1998 (aged 25)			(Costa Rican Football Federation) Alajuelense
4	DF	Mariana Benavides	26 December 1994 (aged 28)			(Costa Rican Football Federation) Saprissa
5	DF	Valeria del Campo	15 February 2000 (aged 23)			(Mexican Football Federation) Monterrey
6	DF	Carol Sánchez	16 April 1986 (aged 37)			(Colombian Football Federation) Independiente Santa Fe
7	MF	Melissa Herrera	10 October 1996 (aged 26)			(French Football Federation) Bordeaux
8	MF	Mariela Campos	7 October 1998 (aged 24)			(Costa Rican Football Federation) Saprissa
9	FW	María Paula Salas	12 July 2002 (aged 21)			(Mexican Football Federation) Monterrey
10	MF	Gloriana Villalobos	20 August 1999 (aged 23)			(Costa Rican Football Federation) Saprissa
11	MF	Rocky Rodríguez (captain)	28 October 1993 (aged 29)			(United States Soccer Federation) Portland Thorns
12	DF	María Paula Elizondo	30 November 1998 (aged 24)			(Costa Rican Football Federation) Saprissa
13	MF	Emilie Valenciano	15 February 1997 (aged 26)			(United States Soccer Federation) Asheville City
14	MF	Priscila Chinchilla	11 July 2001 (aged 22)			(Scottish Football Association) Glasgow City
15	MF	Cristín Granados	19 August 1989 (aged 33)			(Costa Rican Football Federation) Sporting
16	MF	Katherine Alvarado	11 April 1991 (aged 32)			(Costa Rican Football Federation) Saprissa
17	FW	Sofía Varela	28 March 1998 (aged 25)			(Mexican Football Federation) Santos Laguna
18	GK	Priscilla Tapia	2 May 1991 (aged 32)			(Costa Rican Football Federation) Saprissa
19	MF	Alexandra Pinell	18 October 2002 (aged 20)			(Costa Rican Football Federation) Alajuelense
20	DF	Fabiola Villalobos	13 March 1998 (aged 25)			(Costa Rican Football Federation) Alajuelense
21	MF	Sheika Scott	22 October 2006 (aged 16)			(Costa Rican Football Federation) Alajuelense
22	FW	Catalina Estrada	11 October 1998 (aged 24)			(Costa Rican Football Federation) Saprissa
23	GK	Daniela Solera	21 July 1997 (aged 25)			(Costa Rican Football Federation) Sporting

=== Japan ===
Head coach: Futoshi Ikeda

The final 23-player squad was announced on 13 June 2023. The squad numbers were announced on 10 July 2023.

No.	Pos.	Player	Date of birth (age)	Caps	Goals	Club
1	GK	Ayaka Yamashita	29 September 1995 (aged 27)	55	0	(Japan Football Association) INAC Kobe Leonessa
2	DF	Risa Shimizu	15 June 1996 (aged 27)	59	1	(The Football Association) West Ham United
3	DF	Moeka Minami	7 December 1998 (aged 24)	31	1	(Italian Football Federation) Roma
4	DF	Saki Kumagai (captain)	17 October 1990 (aged 32)	133	3	(German Football Association) Bayern Munich
5	DF	Shiori Miyake	13 October 1995 (aged 27)	35	0	(Japan Football Association) INAC Kobe Leonessa
6	MF	Hina Sugita	31 January 1997 (aged 26)	35	2	(United States Soccer Federation) Portland Thorns
7	MF	Hinata Miyazawa	28 November 1999 (aged 23)	20	4	(Japan Football Association) MyNavi Sendai
8	MF	Hikaru Naomoto	3 March 1994 (aged 29)	31	2	(Japan Football Association) Urawa Reds
9	FW	Riko Ueki	30 July 1999 (aged 23)	17	8	(Japan Football Association) Tokyo Verdy Beleza
10	MF	Fūka Nagano	9 March 1999 (aged 24)	30	2	(The Football Association) Liverpool
11	FW	Mina Tanaka	28 April 1994 (aged 29)	62	23	(Japan Football Association) INAC Kobe Leonessa
12	DF	Hana Takahashi	19 February 2000 (aged 23)	13	1	(Japan Football Association) Urawa Reds
13	MF	Jun Endō	24 May 2000 (aged 23)	31	3	(United States Soccer Federation) Angel City
14	MF	Yui Hasegawa	29 January 1997 (aged 26)	63	14	(The Football Association) Manchester City
15	MF	Aoba Fujino	27 January 2004 (aged 19)	7	0	(Japan Football Association) Tokyo Verdy Beleza
16	MF	Honoka Hayashi	19 May 1998 (aged 25)	22	0	(The Football Association) West Ham United
17	DF	Kiko Seike	8 August 1996 (aged 26)	7	2	(Japan Football Association) Urawa Reds
18	GK	Momoko Tanaka	17 March 2000 (aged 23)	5	0	(Japan Football Association) Tokyo Verdy Beleza
19	DF	Miyabi Moriya	22 August 1996 (aged 26)	0	0	(Japan Football Association) INAC Kobe Leonessa
20	FW	Maika Hamano	9 May 2004 (aged 19)	4	0	(Swedish Football Association) Hammarby IF
21	GK	Chika Hirao	31 December 1996 (aged 26)	4	0	(Japan Football Association) Albirex Niigata
22	FW	Remina Chiba	30 April 1999 (aged 24)	4	2	(Japan Football Association) JEF United Chiba
23	DF	Rion Ishikawa	4 July 2003 (aged 20)	1	0	(Japan Football Association) Urawa Reds

=== Spain ===
Head coach: Jorge Vilda

A 30-player preliminary squad was announced on 12 June 2023. The final 23-player squad was announced on 30 June 2023. The squad numbers were unveiled on 2 July 2023.

No.	Pos.	Player	Date of birth (age)	Caps	Goals	Club
1	GK	Misa Rodríguez	22 July 1999 (aged 23)	12	0	(Royal Spanish Football Federation) Real Madrid
2	DF	Ona Batlle	10 June 1999 (aged 24)	28	0	(The Football Association) Manchester United
3	MF	Teresa Abelleira	9 January 2000 (aged 23)	14	1	(Royal Spanish Football Federation) Real Madrid
4	DF	Irene Paredes	4 July 1991 (aged 32)	90	11	(Royal Spanish Football Federation) Barcelona
5	DF	Ivana Andrés (captain)	13 July 1994 (aged 29)	46	0	(Royal Spanish Football Federation) Real Madrid
6	MF	Aitana Bonmatí	18 January 1998 (aged 25)	46	16	(Royal Spanish Football Federation) Barcelona
7	MF	Irene Guerrero	12 December 1996 (aged 26)	22	4	(Royal Spanish Football Federation) Atlético Madrid
8	FW	Mariona Caldentey	19 March 1996 (aged 27)	54	19	(Royal Spanish Football Federation) Barcelona
9	FW	Esther González	8 December 1992 (aged 30)	35	23	(Royal Spanish Football Federation) Real Madrid
10	MF	Jenni Hermoso	9 May 1990 (aged 33)	97	48	(Mexican Football Federation) Pachuca
11	MF	Alexia Putellas	4 February 1994 (aged 29)	100	27	(Royal Spanish Football Federation) Barcelona
12	DF	Oihane Hernández	4 May 2000 (aged 23)	7	0	(Royal Spanish Football Federation) Athletic Bilbao
13	GK	Enith Salón	24 September 2001 (aged 21)	2	0	(Royal Spanish Football Federation) Valencia
14	DF	Laia Codina	22 January 2000 (aged 23)	3	1	(Royal Spanish Football Federation) Barcelona
15	MF	Eva Navarro	27 January 2001 (aged 22)	8	2	(Royal Spanish Football Federation) Atlético Madrid
16	MF	María Pérez	24 December 2001 (aged 21)	2	0	(Royal Spanish Football Federation) Barcelona
17	FW	Alba Redondo	27 August 1996 (aged 26)	26	11	(Royal Spanish Football Federation) Levante
18	FW	Salma Paralluelo	13 November 2003 (aged 19)	6	5	(Royal Spanish Football Federation) Barcelona
19	DF	Olga Carmona	12 June 2000 (aged 23)	22	1	(Royal Spanish Football Federation) Real Madrid
20	DF	Rocío Gálvez	15 April 1997 (aged 26)	8	0	(Royal Spanish Football Federation) Real Madrid
21	MF	Claudia Zornoza	20 October 1990 (aged 32)	10	0	(Royal Spanish Football Federation) Real Madrid
22	MF	Athenea del Castillo	24 October 2000 (aged 22)	25	6	(Royal Spanish Football Federation) Real Madrid
23	GK	Cata Coll	23 April 2001 (aged 22)	0	0	(Royal Spanish Football Federation) Barcelona

=== Zambia ===
Head coach: Bruce Mwape

A 35-player preliminary squad was announced on 16 May. The final 23-player squad was announced on 3 July 2023. Additionally, Esther Siamfuko, Comfort Selemani, and Rhoda Chileshe were named as reserve players. On 12 July 2023, Hazel Nali withdrew from the squad due to a knee injury and the following day Leticia Lungu was called up as her replacement. On 21 July 2023, Grace Chanda withdrew from the squad due to illness and was replaced by Selemani.

No.	Pos.	Player	Date of birth (age)	Caps	Goals	Club
1	GK	Catherine Musonda	20 February 1998 (aged 25)			(Kazakhstan Football Federation) Tomiris-Turan
2	DF	Judith Soko	31 March 2004 (aged 19)			(Football Association of Zambia) YASA
3	DF	Lushomo Mweemba	10 April 2001 (aged 22)			(Football Association of Zambia) Green Buffaloes
4	MF	Susan Banda	6 July 1990 (aged 33)			(Football Association of Zambia) Red Arrows
5	DF	Mary Mulenga	11 April 1998 (aged 25)			(Football Association of Zambia) Red Arrows
6	MF	Mary Wilombe	22 September 1997 (aged 25)			(Football Association of Zambia) Red Arrows
7	FW	Ochumba Lubandji	1 July 2001 (aged 22)			(Football Association of Zambia) Red Arrows
8	DF	Margaret Belemu	24 February 1997 (aged 26)			(Chinese Football Association) Shanghai Shengli
9	MF	Hellen Mubanga	23 May 1995 (aged 28)			(Royal Spanish Football Federation) Zaragoza CFF
10	MF	Comfort Selemani	28 November 2004 (aged 18)			(Football Association of Zambia) Elite Ladies
11	FW	Barbra Banda (captain)	20 March 2000 (aged 23)			(Chinese Football Association) Shanghai Shengli
12	MF	Evarine Katongo	29 December 2002 (aged 20)			(Football Association of Zambia) ZISD Women
13	DF	Martha Tembo	8 March 1998 (aged 25)			(Kazakhstan Football Federation) BIIK Shymkent
14	MF	Ireen Lungu	6 October 1997 (aged 25)			(Kazakhstan Football Federation) BIIK Shymkent
15	DF	Agness Musase	11 July 1997 (aged 26)			(Football Association of Zambia) Green Buffaloes
16	GK	Leticia Lungu	7 August 2004 (aged 18)			(Football Association of Zambia) ZESCO Ndola Girls
17	FW	Racheal Kundananji	3 June 2000 (aged 23)			(Royal Spanish Football Federation) Madrid CFF
18	GK	Eunice Sakala	23 May 2002 (aged 21)			(Football Association of Zambia) Nkwazi Queens
19	FW	Siomala Mapepa	8 August 2002 (aged 20)			(Football Association of Zambia) Elite Ladies
20	MF	Hellen Chanda	19 June 1998 (aged 25)			(Kazakhstan Football Federation) BIIK Shymkent
21	MF	Avell Chitundu	30 July 1997 (aged 25)			(Football Association of Zambia) ZESCO Ndola Girls
22	DF	Esther Banda	21 November 2004 (aged 18)			(Football Association of Zambia) BUSA
23	DF	Vast Phiri	3 February 1996 (aged 27)			(Football Association of Zambia) ZESCO Ndola Girls

== Group D ==
=== China ===
Head coach: Shui Qingxia

The final 23-player squad was announced on 5 July 2023. Shui named Wang Shanshan as captain and Zhang Rui as vice-captain for the tournament.

No.	Pos.	Player	Date of birth (age)	Caps	Goals	Club
1	GK	Zhu Yu	23 July 1997 (aged 25)	10	0	(Chinese Football Association) Shanghai Shengli
2	DF	Li Mengwen	28 March 1995 (aged 28)	17	0	(French Football Federation) Paris Saint-Germain
3	DF	Dou Jiaxing	29 February 2000 (aged 23)	2	0	(Chinese Football Association) Jiangsu
4	DF	Wang Linlin	4 August 2000 (aged 22)	10	1	(Chinese Football Association) Shanghai Shengli
5	DF	Wu Haiyan	26 February 1993 (aged 30)	129	3	(Chinese Football Association) Wuhan Jianghan University
6	MF	Zhang Xin	23 May 1992 (aged 31)	31	3	(Chinese Football Association) Shanghai Shengli
7	FW	Wang Shuang	23 January 1995 (aged 28)	116	38	(United States Soccer Federation) Racing Louisville
8	MF	Yao Wei	1 September 1997 (aged 25)	31	3	(Chinese Football Association) Wuhan Jianghan University
9	MF	Shen Mengyu	19 August 2001 (aged 21)	0	0	(Scottish Football Association) Celtic
10	MF	Zhang Rui (vice-captain)	17 January 1989 (aged 34)	161	24	(Chinese Football Association) Wuhan Jianghan University
11	FW	Wang Shanshan (captain)	27 January 1990 (aged 33)	152	58	(Chinese Football Association) Wuhan Jianghan University
12	GK	Xu Huan	6 March 1999 (aged 24)	4	0	(Chinese Football Association) Jiangsu
13	MF	Yang Lina	13 April 1994 (aged 29)	29	2	(Royal Spanish Football Federation) Levante Las Planas
14	FW	Lou Jiahui	26 May 1991 (aged 32)	111	5	(Chinese Football Association) Wuhan Jianghan University
15	DF	Chen Qiaozhu	8 September 1999 (aged 23)	4	0	(Chinese Football Association) Meizhou Huijun
16	MF	Yao Lingwei	5 December 1995 (aged 27)	16	0	(Chinese Football Association) Wuhan Jianghan University
17	MF	Wu Chengshu	26 August 1996 (aged 26)	13	1	(Football Australia) Canberra United
18	FW	Tang Jiali	16 March 1995 (aged 28)	58	12	(Chinese Football Association) Shanghai Shengli
19	MF	Zhang Linyan	16 January 2001 (aged 22)	14	2	(Swiss Football Association) Grasshoppers
20	FW	Xiao Yuyi	10 January 1996 (aged 27)	42	7	(Chinese Football Association) Shanghai Shengli
21	MF	Gu Yasha	28 November 1990 (aged 32)	121	13	(Chinese Football Association) Wuhan Jianghan University
22	GK	Pan Hongyan	30 December 2004 (aged 18)	0	0	(Chinese Football Association) Beijing
23	DF	Gao Chen	11 August 1992 (aged 30)	29	0	(Chinese Football Association) Changchun Dazhong Zhuoyue

=== Denmark ===
Head coach: Lars Søndergaard

The final 23-player squad was announced on 30 June 2023. On 15 July, Sofie Junge Pedersen withdrew due to injury and was replaced by Sara Thrige. Sofie Bredgaard also joined as reserve player.

No.	Pos.	Player	Date of birth (age)	Caps	Goals	Club
1	GK	Lene Christensen	4 February 2000 (aged 23)	20	0	(Norwegian Football Federation) Rosenborg
2	MF	Josefine Hasbo	20 November 2001 (aged 21)	8	2	(United States Soccer Federation) Harvard Crimson
3	DF	Stine Ballisager	3 January 1994 (aged 29)	43	3	(Norwegian Football Federation) Vålerenga
4	DF	Rikke Sevecke	15 June 1996 (aged 27)	48	5	(The Football Association) Everton
5	DF	Simone Boye	3 March 1992 (aged 31)	83	5	(Swedish Football Association) Hammarby IF
6	MF	Karen Holmgaard	28 January 1999 (aged 24)	26	3	(The Football Association) Everton
7	MF	Sanne Troelsgaard	15 August 1988 (aged 34)	176	55	(The Football Association) Reading
8	MF	Emma Snerle	23 March 2001 (aged 22)	28	2	(The Football Association) West Ham United
9	FW	Amalie Vangsgaard	29 November 1996 (aged 26)	9	0	(French Football Federation) Paris Saint-Germain
10	FW	Pernille Harder (captain)	15 November 1992 (aged 30)	140	70	(The Football Association) Chelsea
11	DF	Katrine Veje	19 June 1991 (aged 32)	144	9	(The Football Association) Everton
12	MF	Kathrine Møller Kühl	5 July 2003 (aged 20)	26	1	(The Football Association) Arsenal
13	MF	Sara Thrige	15 May 1996 (aged 27)	26	2	(Italian Football Federation) AC Milan
14	MF	Nicoline Sørensen	15 August 1997 (aged 25)	49	8	(The Football Association) Everton
15	DF	Frederikke Thøgersen	24 July 1995 (aged 27)	62	1	(Italian Football Federation) Inter Milan
16	GK	Kathrine Larsen	5 May 1993 (aged 30)	8	0	(Danish Football Association) Brøndby
17	FW	Rikke Madsen	9 August 1997 (aged 25)	24	1	(United States Soccer Federation) North Carolina Courage
18	DF	Luna Gevitz	3 March 1994 (aged 29)	21	0	(French Football Federation) Montpellier
19	MF	Janni Thomsen	16 February 2000 (aged 23)	27	4	(Norwegian Football Federation) Vålerenga
20	FW	Signe Bruun	6 April 1998 (aged 25)	32	18	(French Football Federation) Lyon
21	FW	Mille Gejl	23 September 1999 (aged 23)	24	7	(United States Soccer Federation) North Carolina Courage
22	GK	Maja Bay Østergaard	28 March 1998 (aged 25)	2	0	(Danish Football Association) FC Thy-Thisted Q
23	DF	Sofie Svava	11 August 2000 (aged 22)	40	3	(Royal Spanish Football Federation) Real Madrid

=== England ===
Head coach: (Netherlands) Sarina Wiegman

The final 23-player squad was announced on 31 May 2023, with Emily Ramsey, Maya Le Tissier and Jess Park named as standby players. On 27 June 2023, Park withdrew due to a shoulder injury and Lucy Staniforth replaced her as a standby player. With captain Leah Williamson unavailable due to injury, Wiegman named Millie Bright as captain for the tournament. The squad numbers were confirmed on 3 July 2023.

No.	Pos.	Player	Date of birth (age)	Caps	Goals	Club
1	GK	Mary Earps	7 March 1993 (aged 30)	34	0	(The Football Association) Manchester United
2	DF	Lucy Bronze	28 October 1991 (aged 31)	105	12	(Royal Spanish Football Federation) Barcelona
3	DF	Niamh Charles	21 June 1999 (aged 24)	7	0	(The Football Association) Chelsea
4	MF	Keira Walsh	8 April 1997 (aged 26)	59	0	(Royal Spanish Football Federation) Barcelona
5	DF	Alex Greenwood	7 September 1993 (aged 29)	75	5	(The Football Association) Manchester City
6	DF	Millie Bright (captain)	21 August 1993 (aged 29)	66	5	(The Football Association) Chelsea
7	FW	Lauren James	29 September 2001 (aged 21)	11	1	(The Football Association) Chelsea
8	MF	Georgia Stanway	3 January 1999 (aged 24)	50	15	(German Football Association) Bayern Munich
9	FW	Rachel Daly	6 December 1991 (aged 31)	69	13	(The Football Association) Aston Villa
10	MF	Ella Toone	2 September 1999 (aged 23)	32	16	(The Football Association) Manchester United
11	FW	Lauren Hemp	7 August 2000 (aged 22)	38	10	(The Football Association) Manchester City
12	MF	Jordan Nobbs	8 December 1992 (aged 30)	71	8	(The Football Association) Aston Villa
13	GK	Hannah Hampton	16 November 2000 (aged 22)	2	0	(The Football Association) Aston Villa
14	DF	Lotte Wubben-Moy	11 January 1999 (aged 24)	10	0	(The Football Association) Arsenal
15	DF	Esme Morgan	18 October 2000 (aged 22)	5	0	(The Football Association) Manchester City
16	DF	Jess Carter	27 October 1997 (aged 25)	18	1	(The Football Association) Chelsea
17	MF	Laura Coombs	29 January 1991 (aged 32)	5	0	(The Football Association) Manchester City
18	FW	Chloe Kelly	15 January 1998 (aged 25)	26	6	(The Football Association) Manchester City
19	FW	Bethany England	3 June 1994 (aged 29)	21	11	(The Football Association) Tottenham Hotspur
20	MF	Katie Zelem	20 January 1996 (aged 27)	8	0	(The Football Association) Manchester United
21	GK	Ellie Roebuck	23 September 1999 (aged 23)	11	0	(The Football Association) Manchester City
22	FW	Katie Robinson	8 August 2002 (aged 20)	5	0	(The Football Association) Brighton & Hove Albion
23	FW	Alessia Russo	8 February 1999 (aged 24)	22	11	(The Football Association) Manchester United

=== Haiti ===
Head coach: (France) Nicolas Delépine

A 25-player preliminary roster was announced on 15 June 2023. The final squad was announced on 11 July 2023.

No.	Pos.	Player	Date of birth (age)	Caps	Goals	Club
1	GK	Kerly Théus	7 January 1999 (aged 24)	5	0	(United States Soccer Federation) Miami City
2	DF	Chelsea Surpris	20 December 1996 (aged 26)	13	2	(French Football Federation) Grenoble
3	MF	Jennyfer Limage	25 December 1997 (aged 25)	12	0	(French Football Federation) Grenoble
4	DF	Tabita Joseph	13 September 2003 (aged 19)	6	0	(French Football Federation) Brest
5	MF	Maudeline Moryl	24 January 2003 (aged 20)	10	2	(French Football Federation) Grenoble
6	MF	Melchie Dumornay	17 August 2003 (aged 19)	15	9	(French Football Federation) Reims
7	FW	Batcheba Louis	15 June 1997 (aged 26)	16	23	(French Football Federation) Fleury
8	MF	Danielle Etienne	16 January 2001 (aged 22)	9	1	(United States Soccer Federation) Fordham Rams
9	MF	Sherly Jeudy	13 October 1998 (aged 24)	17	4	(French Football Federation) Grenoble
10	FW	Nérilia Mondésir (captain)	17 January 1999 (aged 24)	16	18	(French Football Federation) Montpellier
11	FW	Roseline Éloissaint	20 February 1999 (aged 24)	11	5	(French Football Federation) Nantes
12	GK	Nahomie Ambroise	13 November 2003 (aged 19)	4	0	(United States Soccer Federation) Little Haiti FC
13	DF	Betina Petit-Frère	1 August 2003 (aged 19)	8	0	(French Football Federation) Brest
14	DF	Esthericove Joseph	5 February 2003 (aged 20)	1	0	(Haitian Football Federation) Exafoot
15	FW	Darlina Joseph	15 December 2003 (aged 19)	4	0	(French Football Federation) Grenoble
16	DF	Milan Pierre-Jérôme	23 April 2002 (aged 21)	9	2	(United States Soccer Federation) George Mason Patriots
17	FW	Shwendesky Joseph	18 November 1997 (aged 25)	1	0	(Russian Football Union) Zenit St. Petersburg
18	MF	Noa Ganthier	13 October 2002 (aged 20)	2	0	(United States Soccer Federation) Weston FC
19	MF	Dayana Pierre-Louis	24 September 2003 (aged 19)	2	0	(French Football Federation) Issy
20	DF	Kethna Louis	5 August 1996 (aged 26)	15	4	(French Football Federation) Reims
21	DF	Ruthny Mathurin	14 January 2001 (aged 22)	10	0	(United States Soccer Federation) Louisiana Ragin' Cajuns
22	FW	Roselord Borgella	1 April 1993 (aged 30)	25	20	(French Football Federation) Dijon
23	GK	Lara Larco	27 November 2002 (aged 20)	4	0	(United States Soccer Federation) Georgetown Hoyas

== Group E ==
=== Netherlands ===
Head coach: Andries Jonker

A 30-player preliminary squad was announced on 31 May 2023. The final 23-player squad was announced on 30 June 2023. Additionally, Shanice van de Sanden and Barbara Lorsheyd were named as reserve players.

No.	Pos.	Player	Date of birth (age)	Caps	Goals	Club
1	GK	Daphne van Domselaar	6 March 2000 (aged 23)	13	0	(Royal Dutch Football Association) Twente
2	DF	Lynn Wilms	3 October 2000 (aged 22)	34	1	(German Football Association) VfL Wolfsburg
3	DF	Stefanie van der Gragt	16 August 1992 (aged 30)	101	12	(Italian Football Federation) Inter Milan
4	DF	Aniek Nouwen	9 March 1999 (aged 24)	40	2	(Italian Football Federation) AC Milan
5	DF	Merel van Dongen	11 February 1993 (aged 30)	60	2	(Royal Spanish Football Federation) Atlético Madrid
6	MF	Jill Roord	22 April 1997 (aged 26)	86	21	(German Football Association) VfL Wolfsburg
7	FW	Lineth Beerensteyn	11 October 1996 (aged 26)	90	24	(Italian Football Federation) Juventus
8	MF	Sherida Spitse (captain)	29 May 1990 (aged 33)	215	43	(Royal Dutch Football Association) Ajax
9	FW	Katja Snoeijs	31 August 1996 (aged 26)	15	9	(The Football Association) Everton
10	MF	Daniëlle van de Donk	5 August 1991 (aged 31)	139	34	(French Football Federation) Lyon
11	FW	Lieke Martens	16 December 1992 (aged 30)	144	59	(French Football Federation) Paris Saint-Germain
12	MF	Jill Baijings	23 February 2001 (aged 22)	7	0	(German Football Association) Bayer Leverkusen
13	FW	Renate Jansen	7 December 1990 (aged 32)	55	4	(Royal Dutch Football Association) Twente
14	MF	Jackie Groenen	17 December 1994 (aged 28)	97	9	(French Football Federation) Paris Saint-Germain
15	DF	Caitlin Dijkstra	30 January 1999 (aged 24)	10	1	(Royal Dutch Football Association) Twente
16	GK	Lize Kop	17 March 1998 (aged 25)	7	0	(Royal Dutch Football Association) Ajax
17	MF	Victoria Pelova	3 June 1999 (aged 24)	39	3	(The Football Association) Arsenal
18	MF	Kerstin Casparij	19 August 2000 (aged 22)	22	0	(The Football Association) Manchester City
19	MF	Wieke Kaptein	29 August 2005 (aged 17)	1	0	(Royal Dutch Football Association) Twente
20	DF	Dominique Janssen	17 January 1995 (aged 28)	96	6	(German Football Association) VfL Wolfsburg
21	MF	Damaris Egurrola	26 August 1999 (aged 23)	15	3	(French Football Federation) Lyon
22	FW	Esmee Brugts	28 July 2003 (aged 19)	16	4	(Royal Dutch Football Association) PSV Eindhoven
23	GK	Jacintha Weimar	11 June 1998 (aged 25)	0	0	(Royal Dutch Football Association) Feyenoord

=== Portugal ===
Head coach: Francisco Neto

The final 23-player squad was announced on 30 May 2023.

No.	Pos.	Player	Date of birth (age)	Caps	Goals	Club
1	GK	Inês Pereira	26 May 1999 (aged 24)	33	0	(Swiss Football Association) Servette
2	DF	Catarina Amado	21 July 1999 (aged 23)	23	0	(Portuguese Football Federation) Benfica
3	DF	Lúcia Alves	22 October 1997 (aged 25)	9	0	(Portuguese Football Federation) Benfica
4	DF	Sílvia Rebelo	20 May 1989 (aged 34)	123	2	(Portuguese Football Federation) Benfica
5	DF	Joana Marchão	24 October 1996 (aged 26)	36	1	(Italian Football Federation) Parma
6	MF	Andreia Jacinto	8 June 2002 (aged 21)	23	0	(Royal Spanish Football Federation) Real Sociedad
7	MF	Ana Rute	29 January 1998 (aged 25)	3	0	(Portuguese Football Federation) Braga
8	MF	Andreia Norton	15 August 1996 (aged 26)	73	4	(Portuguese Football Federation) Benfica
9	FW	Ana Borges (vice-captain)	15 June 1990 (aged 33)	157	11	(Portuguese Football Federation) Sporting CP
10	FW	Jéssica Silva	11 December 1994 (aged 28)	100	13	(Portuguese Football Federation) Benfica
11	MF	Tatiana Pinto	28 March 1994 (aged 29)	100	5	(Royal Spanish Football Federation) Levante
12	GK	Patrícia Morais	17 June 1992 (aged 31)	82	0	(Portuguese Football Federation) Braga
13	MF	Fátima Pinto	16 January 1996 (aged 27)	79	3	(Royal Spanish Football Federation) Alavés
14	MF	Dolores Silva (captain)	7 August 1991 (aged 31)	148	17	(Portuguese Football Federation) Braga
15	DF	Carole Costa	3 May 1990 (aged 33)	153	18	(Portuguese Football Federation) Benfica
16	FW	Diana Silva	4 June 1995 (aged 28)	93	20	(Portuguese Football Federation) Sporting CP
17	DF	Ana Seiça	25 March 2001 (aged 22)	2	0	(Portuguese Football Federation) Benfica
18	FW	Carolina Mendes	27 November 1987 (aged 35)	113	23	(Portuguese Football Federation) Braga
19	DF	Diana Gomes	26 July 1998 (aged 24)	34	5	(Royal Spanish Football Federation) Sevilla
20	MF	Kika Nazareth	17 November 2002 (aged 20)	26	6	(Portuguese Football Federation) Benfica
21	FW	Ana Capeta	22 December 1997 (aged 25)	23	6	(Portuguese Football Federation) Sporting CP
22	GK	Rute Costa	1 June 1994 (aged 29)	8	0	(Portuguese Football Federation) Benfica
23	FW	Telma Encarnação	11 October 2001 (aged 21)	21	5	(Portuguese Football Federation) Marítimo

=== United States ===
Head coach: (North Macedonia) Vlatko Andonovski

The final 23-player squad was announced on 21 June 2023. With Becky Sauerbrunn unavailable due to injury, Andonovski named Lindsey Horan and Alex Morgan as co-captains; Horan will captain the team when both are on the pitch.

No.	Pos.	Player	Date of birth (age)	Caps	Goals	Club
1	GK	Alyssa Naeher	20 April 1988 (aged 35)	90	0	(United States Soccer Federation) Chicago Red Stars
2	MF	Ashley Sanchez	16 March 1999 (aged 24)	24	3	(United States Soccer Federation) Washington Spirit
3	DF	Sofia Huerta	14 December 1992 (aged 30)	29	0	(United States Soccer Federation) OL Reign
4	DF	Naomi Girma	14 June 2000 (aged 23)	15	0	(United States Soccer Federation) San Diego Wave
5	DF	Kelley O'Hara	4 August 1988 (aged 34)	157	3	(United States Soccer Federation) NJ/NY Gotham FC
6	FW	Lynn Williams	21 May 1993 (aged 30)	52	15	(United States Soccer Federation) NJ/NY Gotham FC
7	FW	Alyssa Thompson	7 November 2004 (aged 18)	3	0	(United States Soccer Federation) Angel City
8	MF	Julie Ertz	6 April 1992 (aged 31)	118	20	(United States Soccer Federation) Angel City
9	MF	Savannah DeMelo	26 March 1998 (aged 25)	0	0	(United States Soccer Federation) Racing Louisville
10	MF	Lindsey Horan (co-captain)	26 May 1994 (aged 29)	128	27	(French Football Federation) Lyon
11	FW	Sophia Smith	10 August 2000 (aged 22)	29	12	(United States Soccer Federation) Portland Thorns
12	DF	Alana Cook	11 April 1997 (aged 26)	24	1	(United States Soccer Federation) OL Reign
13	FW	Alex Morgan (co-captain)	2 July 1989 (aged 34)	206	121	(United States Soccer Federation) San Diego Wave
14	DF	Emily Sonnett	25 November 1993 (aged 29)	74	1	(United States Soccer Federation) OL Reign
15	FW	Megan Rapinoe	5 July 1985 (aged 38)	199	63	(United States Soccer Federation) OL Reign
16	MF	Rose Lavelle	14 May 1995 (aged 28)	88	24	(United States Soccer Federation) OL Reign
17	MF	Andi Sullivan	20 December 1995 (aged 27)	44	3	(United States Soccer Federation) Washington Spirit
18	GK	Casey Murphy	25 April 1996 (aged 27)	14	0	(United States Soccer Federation) North Carolina Courage
19	DF	Crystal Dunn	3 July 1992 (aged 31)	131	24	(United States Soccer Federation) Portland Thorns
20	FW	Trinity Rodman	20 May 2002 (aged 21)	17	2	(United States Soccer Federation) Washington Spirit
21	GK	Aubrey Kingsbury	20 November 1991 (aged 31)	1	0	(United States Soccer Federation) Washington Spirit
22	MF	Kristie Mewis	25 February 1991 (aged 32)	51	7	(United States Soccer Federation) NJ/NY Gotham FC
23	DF	Emily Fox	5 July 1998 (aged 25)	28	1	(United States Soccer Federation) North Carolina Courage

=== Vietnam ===
Head coach: Mai Đức Chung

A 28-player preliminary squad was announced on 4 June 2023. The final 23-player squad was announced on 2 July 2023.

No.	Pos.	Player	Date of birth (age)	Caps	Goals	Club
1	GK	Đào Thị Kiều Oanh	25 January 2003 (aged 20)	0	0	(Vietnam Football Federation) Hanoi
2	DF	Lương Thị Thu Thương	1 May 2000 (aged 23)	23	0	(Vietnam Football Federation) Than KSVN
3	DF	Chương Thị Kiều	19 August 1995 (aged 27)	89	5	(Vietnam Football Federation) Ho Chi Minh City
4	DF	Trần Thị Thu	15 January 1991 (aged 32)	32	2	(Vietnam Football Federation) Ho Chi Minh City
5	DF	Hoàng Thị Loan	6 February 1995 (aged 28)	41	2	(Vietnam Football Federation) Hanoi
6	DF	Trần Thị Thúy Nga	28 December 1991 (aged 31)	4	0	(Vietnam Football Federation) Thai Nguyen T&T
7	MF	Nguyễn Thị Tuyết Dung	13 December 1993 (aged 29)	119	51	(Vietnam Football Federation) Phong Phu Ha Nam
8	MF	Trần Thị Thùy Trang	8 August 1988 (aged 34)	60	7	(Vietnam Football Federation) Ho Chi Minh City
9	FW	Huỳnh Như (Captain)	28 November 1991 (aged 31)	103	67	(Portuguese Football Federation) Länk Vilaverdense
10	DF	Trần Thị Hải Linh	8 June 2001 (aged 22)	18	0	(Vietnam Football Federation) Hanoi
11	MF	Thái Thị Thảo	12 February 1995 (aged 28)	46	12	(Vietnam Football Federation) Hanoi
12	FW	Phạm Hải Yến	9 November 1994 (aged 28)	76	42	(Vietnam Football Federation) Hanoi
13	DF	Lê Thị Diễm My	6 March 1994 (aged 29)	14	0	(Vietnam Football Federation) Than KSVN
14	GK	Trần Thị Kim Thanh	18 September 1993 (aged 29)	48	0	(Vietnam Football Federation) Ho Chi Minh City
15	FW	Nguyễn Thị Thúy Hằng	4 March 2000 (aged 23)	16	5	(Vietnam Football Federation) Than KSVN
16	MF	Dương Thị Vân	20 September 1994 (aged 28)	42	2	(Vietnam Football Federation) Than KSVN
17	DF	Trần Thị Thu Thảo	15 January 1993 (aged 30)	44	3	(Vietnam Football Federation) Ho Chi Minh City
18	FW	Vũ Thị Hoa	6 November 2003 (aged 19)	6	0	(Vietnam Football Federation) Hanoi
19	MF	Nguyễn Thị Thanh Nhã	25 September 2001 (aged 21)	28	7	(Vietnam Football Federation) Hanoi
20	GK	Khổng Thị Hằng	10 October 1993 (aged 29)	29	0	(Vietnam Football Federation) Than KSVN
21	MF	Ngân Thị Vạn Sự	29 April 2001 (aged 22)	27	6	(Vietnam Football Federation) Hanoi
22	DF	Nguyễn Thị Mỹ Anh	27 November 1994 (aged 28)	25	0	(Vietnam Football Federation) Thai Nguyen T&T
23	MF	Nguyễn Thị Bích Thùy	1 May 1994 (aged 29)	64	13	(Vietnam Football Federation) Ho Chi Minh City

== Group F ==
=== Brazil ===
Head coach: (Sweden) Pia Sundhage

The final 23-player squad was announced on 27 June 2023, with Tainara, Angelina, and Aline Gomes being named as reserve players. The squad numbers were unveiled on 4 July 2023. On 18 July 2023, Nycole withdrew due to a sprained ankle and was replaced by Angelina.

No.	Pos.	Player	Date of birth (age)	Caps	Goals	Club
1	GK	Bárbara	4 July 1988 (aged 35)	69	0	(Brazilian Football Confederation) Flamengo
2	DF	Antônia	26 April 1994 (aged 29)	25	0	(Royal Spanish Football Federation) Levante
3	DF	Kathellen	26 April 1996 (aged 27)	21	1	(Royal Spanish Football Federation) Real Madrid
4	DF	Rafaelle Souza	18 June 1991 (aged 32)	82	8	(The Football Association) Arsenal
5	MF	Luana	2 May 1993 (aged 30)	32	1	(Brazilian Football Confederation) Corinthians
6	DF	Tamires	10 October 1987 (aged 35)	140	7	(Brazilian Football Confederation) Corinthians
7	FW	Andressa Alves	10 November 1992 (aged 30)	106	21	(Italian Football Federation) Roma
8	MF	Ana Vitória	6 March 2000 (aged 23)	14	1	(Portuguese Football Federation) Benfica
9	FW	Debinha	20 October 1991 (aged 31)	134	58	(United States Soccer Federation) Kansas City Current
10	FW	Marta (captain)	19 February 1986 (aged 37)	175	115	(United States Soccer Federation) Orlando Pride
11	MF	Adriana	17 November 1996 (aged 26)	43	12	(United States Soccer Federation) Orlando Pride
12	GK	Letícia Izidoro	13 August 1994 (aged 28)	16	0	(Brazilian Football Confederation) Corinthians
13	DF	Bruninha	16 June 2002 (aged 21)	8	0	(United States Soccer Federation) NJ/NY Gotham FC
14	DF	Lauren	13 September 2002 (aged 20)	10	0	(Royal Spanish Football Federation) Madrid CFF
15	MF	Duda Sampaio	18 May 2001 (aged 22)	8	1	(Brazilian Football Confederation) Corinthians
16	FW	Bia Zaneratto	17 December 1993 (aged 29)	110	37	(Brazilian Football Confederation) Palmeiras
17	MF	Ary Borges	28 December 1999 (aged 23)	28	5	(United States Soccer Federation) Racing Louisville
18	FW	Geyse	27 March 1998 (aged 25)	43	6	(Royal Spanish Football Federation) Barcelona
19	DF	Mônica	21 April 1987 (aged 36)	42	6	(Royal Spanish Football Federation) Madrid CFF
20	MF	Angelina	26 January 2000 (aged 23)	20	1	(United States Soccer Federation) OL Reign
21	MF	Kerolin	17 November 1999 (aged 23)	33	5	(United States Soccer Federation) North Carolina Courage
22	GK	Camila	2 January 2001 (aged 22)	0	0	(Brazilian Football Confederation) Santos
23	FW	Gabi Nunes	10 March 1997 (aged 26)	20	3	(Royal Spanish Football Federation) Madrid CFF

=== France ===
Head coach: Hervé Renard

A 26-player preliminary squad was announced on 6 June 2023. The final 23-player squad was announced on 4 July 2023, with Mylène Chavas and Aïssatou Tounkara named as reserve players. On 7 July 2023, Amandine Henry withdrew due to a calf injury and was replaced by Tounkara.

No.	Pos.	Player	Date of birth (age)	Caps	Goals	Club
1	GK	Solène Durand	20 November 1994 (aged 28)	2	0	(French Football Federation) Guingamp
2	DF	Maëlle Lakrar	27 May 2000 (aged 23)	2	0	(French Football Federation) Montpellier
3	DF	Wendie Renard (captain)	20 July 1990 (aged 33)	144	34	(French Football Federation) Lyon
4	MF	Laurina Fazer	13 October 2003 (aged 19)	2	0	(French Football Federation) Paris Saint-Germain
5	DF	Élisa De Almeida	11 January 1998 (aged 25)	18	3	(French Football Federation) Paris Saint-Germain
6	MF	Sandie Toletti	13 July 1995 (aged 28)	40	3	(Royal Spanish Football Federation) Real Madrid
7	DF	Sakina Karchaoui	26 January 1996 (aged 27)	56	0	(French Football Federation) Paris Saint-Germain
8	MF	Grace Geyoro	2 July 1997 (aged 26)	64	15	(French Football Federation) Paris Saint-Germain
9	FW	Eugénie Le Sommer	18 May 1989 (aged 34)	177	88	(French Football Federation) Lyon
10	MF	Amel Majri	25 January 1993 (aged 30)	67	11	(French Football Federation) Lyon
11	FW	Kadidiatou Diani	1 April 1995 (aged 28)	82	22	(French Football Federation) Paris Saint-Germain
12	FW	Clara Mateo	28 November 1997 (aged 25)	21	4	(French Football Federation) Paris FC
13	DF	Selma Bacha	9 November 2000 (aged 22)	15	1	(French Football Federation) Lyon
14	DF	Aïssatou Tounkara	16 March 1995 (aged 28)	39	3	(The Football Association) Manchester United
15	MF	Kenza Dali	31 July 1991 (aged 31)	54	11	(The Football Association) Aston Villa
16	GK	Pauline Peyraud-Magnin	17 March 1992 (aged 31)	39	0	(Italian Football Federation) Juventus
17	MF	Léa Le Garrec	9 July 1993 (aged 30)	5	1	(French Football Federation) Fleury
18	FW	Viviane Asseyi	20 November 1993 (aged 29)	61	14	(The Football Association) West Ham United
19	FW	Naomie Feller	6 November 2001 (aged 21)	3	1	(Royal Spanish Football Federation) Real Madrid
20	DF	Estelle Cascarino	5 February 1997 (aged 26)	9	1	(The Football Association) Manchester United
21	GK	Constance Picaud	5 July 1998 (aged 25)	2	0	(French Football Federation) Paris Saint-Germain
22	DF	Ève Périsset	24 December 1994 (aged 28)	47	4	(The Football Association) Chelsea
23	FW	Vicki Bècho	3 October 2003 (aged 19)	0	0	(French Football Federation) Lyon

=== Jamaica ===
Head coach: Lorne Donaldson

A 24-player preliminary squad was announced on 10 June 2023. The final 23-player squad was announced on 23 June 2023, with Sashana Campbell named as an alternate.

No.	Pos.	Player	Date of birth (age)	Caps	Goals	Club
1	GK	Sydney Schneider	31 August 1999 (aged 23)	21	0	(Football Association of the Czech Republic) Sparta Prague
2	MF	Solai Washington	1 October 2005 (aged 17)	0	0	(United States Soccer Federation) Concorde Fire
3	DF	Vyan Sampson	2 July 1996 (aged 27)	8	0	(Scottish Football Association) Hearts
4	DF	Chantelle Swaby	6 August 1998 (aged 24)	30	0	(French Football Federation) Fleury
5	DF	Konya Plummer	2 August 1997 (aged 25)	31	2	(United States Soccer Federation) Orlando Pride
6	MF	Havana Solaun	23 February 1993 (aged 30)	16	2	(United States Soccer Federation) Houston Dash
7	MF	Peyton McNamara	22 February 2002 (aged 21)	2	0	(United States Soccer Federation) Ohio State Buckeyes
8	MF	Drew Spence	23 October 1992 (aged 30)	7	1	(The Football Association) Tottenham Hotspur
9	FW	Kameron Simmonds	6 December 2003 (aged 19)	1	0	(United States Soccer Federation) Tennessee Volunteers
10	FW	Jody Brown	16 April 2002 (aged 21)	29	13	(United States Soccer Federation) Florida State Seminoles
11	FW	Khadija Shaw (captain)	31 January 1997 (aged 26)	38	56	(The Football Association) Manchester City
12	FW	Kiki Van Zanten	25 August 2001 (aged 21)	6	1	(United States Soccer Federation) Notre Dame Fighting Irish
13	GK	Becky Spencer	22 February 1991 (aged 32)	9	0	(The Football Association) Tottenham Hotspur
14	DF	Deneisha Blackwood	7 March 1997 (aged 26)	28	2	(French Football Federation) Issy
15	FW	Tiffany Cameron	16 October 1991 (aged 31)	13	6	(Hungarian Football Federation) Ferencváros
16	FW	Paige Bailey-Gayle	12 November 2001 (aged 21)	6	0	(The Football Association) Crystal Palace
17	DF	Allyson Swaby	3 October 1996 (aged 26)	28	1	(French Football Federation) Paris Saint-Germain
18	MF	Trudi Carter	18 November 1994 (aged 28)	21	9	(Royal Spanish Football Federation) Levante Las Planas
19	DF	Tiernny Wiltshire	8 May 1998 (aged 25)	11	0	(United States Soccer Federation) Houston Dash
20	MF	Atlanta Primus	21 April 1997 (aged 26)	7	0	(The Football Association) London City Lionesses
21	FW	Cheyna Matthews	10 November 1993 (aged 29)	12	0	(United States Soccer Federation) Chicago Red Stars
22	FW	Kayla McKenna	3 September 1996 (aged 26)	15	3	(Scottish Football Association) Rangers
23	GK	Liya Brooks	17 May 2005 (aged 18)	2	0	(United States Soccer Federation) Washington State Cougars

=== Panama ===
Head coach: (Mexico) Ignacio Quintana

The final 23-player squad was announced on 22 June 2023.

No.	Pos.	Player	Date of birth (age)	Caps	Goals	Club
1	GK	Sasha Fábrega	23 October 1990 (aged 32)	3	0	(Panamanian Football Federation) Independiente La Chorrera
2	DF	Hilary Jaén	29 August 2002 (aged 20)	15	0	(United States Soccer Federation) Jones County Bobcats
3	DF	Wendy Natis	19 August 2002 (aged 20)	8	0	(Colombian Football Federation) América de Cali
4	DF	Katherine Castillo	23 March 1996 (aged 27)	16	1	(Panamanian Football Federation) Tauro
5	DF	Yomira Pinzón	23 August 1996 (aged 26)	19	3	(Costa Rican Football Federation) Saprissa
6	MF	Deysiré Salazar	4 May 2004 (aged 19)	18	1	(Panamanian Football Federation) Tauro
7	MF	Emily Cedeño	22 November 2003 (aged 19)	4	0	(Panamanian Football Federation) Tauro
8	MF	Schiandra González	4 July 1995 (aged 28)	11	0	(Panamanian Football Federation) Tauro
9	FW	Karla Riley	18 September 1997 (aged 25)	10	4	(Costa Rican Football Federation) Sporting San José
10	MF	Marta Cox	20 July 1997 (aged 26)	19	9	(Mexican Football Federation) Pachuca
11	MF	Natalia Mills (captain)	22 March 1993 (aged 30)	12	0	(Costa Rican Football Federation) Alajuelense
12	GK	Yenith Bailey	29 March 2001 (aged 22)	13	0	(Panamanian Football Federation) Tauro
13	FW	Riley Tanner	15 October 1999 (aged 23)	2	1	(United States Soccer Federation) Washington Spirit
14	MF	Carmen Montenegro	5 December 2000 (aged 22)	3	0	(Panamanian Football Federation) Sporting San Miguelito
15	DF	Rosario Vargas	9 August 2002 (aged 20)	5	0	(Royal Spanish Football Federation) Rayo Vallecano
16	DF	Rebeca Espinosa	5 July 1992 (aged 31)	9	0	(Panamanian Football Federation) Sporting San Miguelito
17	MF	Laurie Batista	29 May 1996 (aged 27)	10	0	(Panamanian Football Federation) Tauro
18	MF	Erika Hernández	17 March 1999 (aged 24)	10	2	(Panamanian Football Federation) Plaza Amador
19	FW	Lineth Cedeño	5 December 2000 (aged 22)	14	8	(Panamanian Football Federation) Sporting San Miguelito
20	MF	Aldrith Quintero	1 January 2002 (aged 21)	7	1	(Royal Spanish Football Federation) Alhama
21	DF	Nicole De Obaldía	16 March 2000 (aged 23)	7	0	(Costa Rican Football Federation) Herediano
22	GK	Farissa Córdoba	30 June 1989 (aged 34)	4	0	(Ecuadorian Football Federation) Ñañas
23	DF	Carina Baltrip-Reyes	1 July 1998 (aged 25)	11	1	(Portuguese Football Federation) Marítimo

== Group G ==
=== Argentina ===
Head coach: Germán Portanova

A 25-player preliminary squad was announced on 1 July 2023. The final 23-player squad was announced on 8 July 2023.

No.	Pos.	Player	Date of birth (age)	Caps	Goals	Club
1	GK	Vanina Correa (captain)	14 August 1983 (aged 39)			(Argentine Football Association) Rosario Central
2	DF	Adriana Sachs	25 December 1993 (aged 29)			(Brazilian Football Confederation) Santos
3	DF	Eliana Stábile	26 November 1993 (aged 29)			(Brazilian Football Confederation) Santos
4	DF	Julieta Cruz	4 June 1996 (aged 27)			(Argentine Football Association) Boca Juniors
5	MF	Vanesa Santana	3 September 1990 (aged 32)			(Royal Spanish Football Federation) Sporting Huelva
6	DF	Aldana Cometti	3 March 1996 (aged 27)			(Royal Spanish Football Federation) Madrid CFF
7	MF	Romina Núñez	1 January 1994 (aged 29)			(Argentine Football Association) UAI Urquiza
8	MF	Daiana Falfán	14 October 2000 (aged 22)			(Argentine Football Association) UAI Urquiza
9	FW	Paulina Gramaglia	21 March 2003 (aged 20)			(Brazilian Football Confederation) Red Bull Bragantino
10	MF	Dalila Ippólito	24 March 2002 (aged 21)			(Italian Football Federation) Parma
11	FW	Yamila Rodríguez	24 January 1998 (aged 25)			(Brazilian Football Confederation) Palmeiras
12	GK	Lara Esponda	8 November 2005 (aged 17)			(Argentine Football Association) River Plate
13	DF	Sophia Braun	26 January 2000 (aged 23)			(Mexican Football Federation) León
14	DF	Miriam Mayorga	20 November 1989 (aged 33)			(Argentine Football Association) Boca Juniors
15	FW	Florencia Bonsegundo	14 July 1993 (aged 30)			(Royal Spanish Football Federation) Madrid CFF
16	MF	Lorena Benítez	3 December 1998 (aged 24)			(Brazilian Football Confederation) Palmeiras
17	MF	Camila Gómez Ares	26 October 1994 (aged 28)			(Football Federation of Chile) Universidad de Concepción
18	DF	Gabriela Chávez	9 April 1989 (aged 34)			(Argentine Football Association) Estudiantes (BA)
19	FW	Mariana Larroquette	24 October 1992 (aged 30)			(United States Soccer Federation) Orlando Pride
20	DF	Chiara Singarella	5 December 2003 (aged 19)			(United States Soccer Federation) South Alabama Jaguars
21	FW	Érica Lonigro	6 July 1994 (aged 29)			(Argentine Football Association) Rosario Central
22	FW	Estefanía Banini	21 June 1990 (aged 33)			(Royal Spanish Football Federation) Atlético Madrid
23	GK	Abigaíl Chaves	11 July 1997 (aged 26)			(Argentine Football Association) Huracán

=== Italy ===
Head coach: Milena Bertolini

A 32-player preliminary squad was announced on 23 June 2023. The final 23-player squad was announced on 2 July 2023. Additionally, Maria Luisa Filangeri and Beatrice Merlo were named as reserve players. The squad numbers were revealed on 6 July 2023.

No.	Pos.	Player	Date of birth (age)	Caps	Goals	Club
1	GK	Laura Giuliani	5 June 1993 (aged 30)	48	0	(Italian Football Federation) AC Milan
2	MF	Emma Severini	18 July 2003 (aged 20)	0	0	(Italian Football Federation) Fiorentina
3	DF	Benedetta Orsi	25 February 2000 (aged 23)	6	0	(Italian Football Federation) Sassuolo
4	DF	Lucia Di Guglielmo	26 June 1997 (aged 26)	12	0	(Italian Football Federation) Roma
5	DF	Elena Linari	15 April 1994 (aged 29)	87	4	(Italian Football Federation) Roma
6	MF	Manuela Giugliano	18 August 1997 (aged 25)	66	8	(Italian Football Federation) Roma
7	FW	Sofia Cantore	30 September 1999 (aged 23)	13	1	(Italian Football Federation) Juventus
8	FW	Barbara Bonansea	13 June 1991 (aged 32)	90	30	(Italian Football Federation) Juventus
9	FW	Valentina Giacinti	2 January 1994 (aged 29)	62	22	(Italian Football Federation) Roma
10	FW	Cristiana Girelli (captain)	23 April 1990 (aged 33)	103	53	(Italian Football Federation) Juventus
11	FW	Benedetta Glionna	26 July 1999 (aged 23)	15	0	(Italian Football Federation) Roma
12	GK	Rachele Baldi	2 October 1994 (aged 28)	1	0	(Italian Football Federation) Fiorentina
13	DF	Elisa Bartoli	7 May 1991 (aged 32)	85	3	(Italian Football Federation) Roma
14	FW	Chiara Beccari	27 September 2004 (aged 18)	1	0	(Italian Football Federation) Como
15	FW	Annamaria Serturini	13 May 1998 (aged 25)	20	1	(Italian Football Federation) Roma
16	MF	Giulia Dragoni	7 November 2006 (aged 16)	0	0	(Royal Spanish Football Federation) Barcelona
17	DF	Lisa Boattin	3 May 1997 (aged 26)	49	1	(Italian Football Federation) Juventus
18	MF	Arianna Caruso	6 November 1999 (aged 23)	31	10	(Italian Football Federation) Juventus
19	DF	Martina Lenzini	23 July 1998 (aged 24)	19	0	(Italian Football Federation) Juventus
20	MF	Giada Greggi	18 February 2000 (aged 23)	9	1	(Italian Football Federation) Roma
21	MF	Valentina Cernoia	22 June 1991 (aged 32)	75	14	(Italian Football Federation) Juventus
22	GK	Francesca Durante	12 February 1997 (aged 26)	6	0	(Italian Football Federation) Inter Milan
23	DF	Cecilia Salvai	2 December 1993 (aged 29)	44	2	(Italian Football Federation) Juventus

=== South Africa ===
Head coach: Desiree Ellis

A 36-player preliminary squad was announced on 5 June 2023. The final 23-player squad was announced on 23 June 2023. Additionally, Nthabiseng Majiya, Amogelang Motau, and Regirl Ngobeni were named as reserve players. On 8 July 2023, it was announced that Majiya withdrew due to injury and Sphumelele Shamase replaced her as a reserve player.

No.	Pos.	Player	Date of birth (age)	Caps	Goals	Club
1	GK	Kaylin Swart	30 September 1994 (aged 28)			(South African Football Association) JVW
2	DF	Lebogang Ramalepe	3 December 1991 (aged 31)			(South African Football Association) Mamelodi Sundowns
3	DF	Bongeka Gamede	22 May 1999 (aged 24)			(South African Football Association) UWC
4	DF	Noko Matlou	30 September 1985 (aged 37)			(Royal Spanish Football Federation) Eibar
5	DF	Fikile Magama	19 January 2002 (aged 21)			(South African Football Association) UWC
6	MF	Noxolo Cesane	11 October 2000 (aged 22)			(Mexican Football Federation) Tigres UANL
7	DF	Karabo Dhlamini	18 September 2001 (aged 21)			(South African Football Association) Mamelodi Sundowns
8	FW	Hildah Magaia	16 December 1994 (aged 28)			(Korea Football Association) Sejong Sportstoto
9	MF	Gabriela Salgado	20 February 1998 (aged 25)			(South African Football Association) JVW
10	FW	Linda Motlhalo	1 July 1998 (aged 25)			(Scottish Football Association) Glasgow City
11	FW	Thembi Kgatlana	2 May 1996 (aged 27)			(United States Soccer Federation) Racing Louisville
12	FW	Jermaine Seoposenwe	12 October 1993 (aged 29)			(Mexican Football Federation) Monterrey
13	DF	Bambanani Mbane	12 March 1990 (aged 33)			(South African Football Association) Mamelodi Sundowns
14	DF	Tiisetso Makhubela	24 April 1997 (aged 26)			(South African Football Association) Mamelodi Sundowns
15	MF	Refiloe Jane (captain)	4 August 1992 (aged 30)			(Italian Football Federation) Sassuolo
16	GK	Andile Dlamini	2 September 1992 (aged 30)			(South African Football Association) Mamelodi Sundowns
17	FW	Melinda Kgadiete	21 July 1992 (aged 30)			(South African Football Association) Mamelodi Sundowns
18	MF	Sibulele Holweni	28 April 2001 (aged 22)			(South African Football Association) UWC
19	MF	Kholosa Biyana	6 September 1994 (aged 28)			(South African Football Association) UWC
20	MF	Robyn Moodaly	16 June 1994 (aged 29)			(South African Football Association) JVW
21	GK	Kebotseng Moletsane	3 March 1995 (aged 28)			(South African Football Association) Royal AM
22	MF	Nomvula Kgoale	20 November 1995 (aged 27)			(South African Football Association) TS Galaxy Queens
23	FW	Wendy Shongwe	18 January 2003 (aged 20)			(South African Football Association) University of Pretoria

=== Sweden ===
Head coach: Peter Gerhardsson

The final 23-player squad was announced on 13 June 2023. The numbers were announced on 28 June 2023. On 18 July 2023, Hanna Lundkvist withdrew from the squad due to injury and was replaced by Stina Lennartsson.

No.	Pos.	Player	Date of birth (age)	Caps	Goals	Club
1	GK	Zećira Mušović	26 May 1996 (aged 27)	10	0	(The Football Association) Chelsea
2	DF	Jonna Andersson	2 January 1993 (aged 30)	80	3	(Swedish Football Association) Hammarby IF
3	DF	Linda Sembrant	15 May 1987 (aged 36)	136	17	(Italian Football Federation) Juventus
4	DF	Stina Lennartsson	4 April 1997 (aged 26)	1	0	(Swedish Football Association) Linköping FC
5	DF	Anna Sandberg	23 May 2003 (aged 20)	2	0	(Swedish Football Association) BK Häcken
6	DF	Magdalena Eriksson	8 September 1993 (aged 29)	95	10	(The Football Association) Chelsea
7	FW	Madelen Janogy	12 November 1995 (aged 27)	33	8	(Swedish Football Association) Hammarby IF
8	FW	Lina Hurtig	5 September 1995 (aged 27)	62	20	(The Football Association) Arsenal
9	MF	Kosovare Asllani	29 July 1989 (aged 33)	170	44	(Italian Football Federation) AC Milan
10	FW	Sofia Jakobsson	23 April 1990 (aged 33)	144	23	(United States Soccer Federation) San Diego Wave
11	FW	Stina Blackstenius	5 February 1996 (aged 27)	90	28	(The Football Association) Arsenal
12	GK	Jennifer Falk	26 April 1993 (aged 30)	16	0	(Swedish Football Association) BK Häcken
13	DF	Amanda Ilestedt	17 January 1993 (aged 30)	64	8	(French Football Federation) Paris Saint-Germain
14	DF	Nathalie Björn	4 May 1997 (aged 26)	50	6	(The Football Association) Everton
15	FW	Rebecka Blomqvist	24 July 1997 (aged 25)	22	4	(German Football Association) VfL Wolfsburg
16	MF	Filippa Angeldahl	14 July 1997 (aged 26)	40	11	(The Football Association) Manchester City
17	MF	Caroline Seger (captain)	19 March 1985 (aged 38)	235	32	(Swedish Football Association) Rosengård
18	FW	Fridolina Rolfö	24 November 1993 (aged 29)	77	25	(Royal Spanish Football Federation) Barcelona
19	MF	Johanna Rytting Kaneryd	12 February 1997 (aged 26)	25	2	(The Football Association) Chelsea
20	MF	Hanna Bennison	16 October 2002 (aged 20)	33	1	(The Football Association) Everton
21	GK	Tove Enblom	20 November 1994 (aged 28)	0	0	(Swedish Football Association) Örebro
22	MF	Olivia Schough	11 March 1991 (aged 32)	105	13	(Swedish Football Association) Rosengård
23	MF	Elin Rubensson	11 May 1993 (aged 30)	78	3	(Swedish Football Association) BK Häcken

== Group H ==
=== Colombia ===
Head coach: Nelson Abadía Stand-in coach: Ángelo Marsiglia

The final 23-player squad was announced on 4 July 2023.

No.	Pos.	Player	Date of birth (age)	Caps	Goals	Club
1	GK	Catalina Pérez	8 November 1994 (aged 28)	20	0	(Brazilian Football Confederation) Avaí
2	DF	Manuela Vanegas	9 November 2000 (aged 22)	34	8	(Royal Spanish Football Federation) Real Sociedad
3	DF	Daniela Arias	31 August 1994 (aged 28)	19	3	(Colombian Football Federation) América de Cali
4	MF	Diana Ospina	3 March 1989 (aged 34)	62	5	(Colombian Football Federation) América de Cali
5	MF	Lorena Bedoya	6 October 1997 (aged 25)	16	0	(Brazilian Football Confederation) Real Brasília
6	MF	Daniela Montoya (captain)	22 August 1990 (aged 32)	64	6	(Colombian Football Federation) Atlético Nacional
7	MF	María Camila Reyes	11 May 2002 (aged 21)	4	0	(Colombian Football Federation) Independiente Santa Fe
8	MF	Marcela Restrepo	10 November 1995 (aged 27)	11	2	(Royal Spanish Football Federation) Logroño
9	MF	Mayra Ramírez	23 March 1999 (aged 24)	23	3	(Royal Spanish Football Federation) Levante
10	MF	Leicy Santos	16 May 1996 (aged 27)	43	7	(Royal Spanish Football Federation) Atlético Madrid
11	FW	Catalina Usme	25 December 1989 (aged 33)	77	39	(Colombian Football Federation) América de Cali
12	GK	Sandra Sepúlveda	3 March 1988 (aged 35)	49	0	(Colombian Football Federation) Independiente Medellín
13	GK	Natalia Giraldo	19 May 2003 (aged 20)	3	0	(Colombian Football Federation) América de Cali
14	DF	Ángela Barón	18 September 2003 (aged 19)	0	0	(Colombian Football Federation) Atlético Nacional
15	DF	Ana María Guzmán	11 June 2005 (aged 18)	1	0	(Colombian Football Federation) Deportivo Pereira
16	MF	Lady Andrade	10 January 1992 (aged 31)	30	3	(Brazilian Football Confederation) Real Brasília
17	DF	Carolina Arias	2 September 1990 (aged 32)	71	1	(Colombian Football Federation) Junior
18	FW	Linda Caicedo	22 February 2005 (aged 18)	18	4	(Royal Spanish Football Federation) Real Madrid
19	DF	Jorelyn Carabalí	18 May 1997 (aged 26)	18	0	(Brazilian Football Confederation) Atlético Mineiro
20	DF	Mónica Ramos	14 October 1998 (aged 24)	12	0	(Brazilian Football Confederation) Grêmio
21	FW	Ivonne Chacón	12 October 1997 (aged 25)	6	0	(Royal Spanish Football Federation) Valencia
22	DF	Daniela Caracas	25 April 1997 (aged 26)	22	0	(Royal Spanish Football Federation) Espanyol
23	FW	Elexa Bahr	16 May 1998 (aged 25)	12	0	(Colombian Football Federation) América de Cali

=== Germany ===
Head coach: Martina Voss-Tecklenburg

A 28-player preliminary squad was announced on 31 May 2023. The final 23-player squad was announced on 8 July 2023.

No.	Pos.	Player	Date of birth (age)	Caps	Goals	Club
1	GK	Merle Frohms	28 January 1995 (aged 28)	40	0	(German Football Association) VfL Wolfsburg
2	MF	Chantal Hagel	20 July 1998 (aged 25)	10	0	(German Football Association) 1899 Hoffenheim
3	DF	Kathrin Hendrich	6 April 1992 (aged 31)	58	5	(German Football Association) VfL Wolfsburg
4	DF	Sophia Kleinherne	12 April 2000 (aged 23)	27	1	(German Football Association) Eintracht Frankfurt
5	DF	Marina Hegering	17 April 1990 (aged 33)	29	3	(German Football Association) VfL Wolfsburg
6	MF	Lena Oberdorf	19 December 2001 (aged 21)	38	3	(German Football Association) VfL Wolfsburg
7	FW	Lea Schüller	12 November 1997 (aged 25)	47	31	(German Football Association) Bayern Munich
8	MF	Sydney Lohmann	19 June 2000 (aged 23)	22	4	(German Football Association) Bayern Munich
9	FW	Svenja Huth	25 January 1991 (aged 32)	80	14	(German Football Association) VfL Wolfsburg
10	FW	Laura Freigang	1 February 1998 (aged 25)	20	12	(German Football Association) Eintracht Frankfurt
11	FW	Alexandra Popp (captain)	6 April 1991 (aged 32)	128	62	(German Football Association) VfL Wolfsburg
12	GK	Ann-Katrin Berger	9 October 1990 (aged 32)	6	0	(The Football Association) Chelsea
13	MF	Sara Däbritz	15 February 1995 (aged 28)	97	17	(French Football Federation) Lyon
14	MF	Lena Lattwein	2 May 2000 (aged 23)	29	1	(German Football Association) VfL Wolfsburg
15	DF	Sjoeke Nüsken	22 January 2001 (aged 22)	17	2	(German Football Association) Eintracht Frankfurt
16	FW	Nicole Anyomi	10 February 2000 (aged 23)	16	1	(German Football Association) Eintracht Frankfurt
17	DF	Felicitas Rauch	30 April 1996 (aged 27)	33	4	(German Football Association) VfL Wolfsburg
18	MF	Melanie Leupolz	14 April 1994 (aged 29)	78	13	(The Football Association) Chelsea
19	FW	Klara Bühl	7 December 2000 (aged 22)	35	14	(German Football Association) Bayern Munich
20	MF	Lina Magull	15 August 1994 (aged 28)	72	22	(German Football Association) Bayern Munich
21	GK	Stina Johannes	23 January 2000 (aged 23)	0	0	(German Football Association) Eintracht Frankfurt
22	MF	Jule Brand	16 October 2002 (aged 20)	32	7	(German Football Association) VfL Wolfsburg
23	DF	Sara Doorsoun	17 November 1991 (aged 31)	45	1	(German Football Association) Eintracht Frankfurt

=== Morocco ===
Head coach: (France) Reynald Pedros

A 28-player preliminary squad was announced on 19 June 2023. The final squad was announced on 11 July 2023.

No.	Pos.	Player	Date of birth (age)	Caps	Goals	Club
1	GK	Khadija Er-Rmichi	16 September 1989 (aged 33)			(Royal Moroccan Football Federation) AS FAR
2	DF	Zineb Redouani	12 June 2000 (aged 23)			(Royal Moroccan Football Federation) AS FAR
3	DF	Nouhaila Benzina	11 April 1998 (aged 25)			(Royal Moroccan Football Federation) AS FAR
4	MF	Sarah Kassi	9 September 2003 (aged 19)			(French Football Federation) Fleury
5	DF	Nesryne El Chad	13 March 2003 (aged 20)			(French Football Federation) Lille
6	MF	Élodie Nakkach	20 January 1995 (aged 28)			(Swiss Football Association) Servette
7	FW	Ghizlane Chebbak (captain)	19 February 1991 (aged 32)			(Royal Moroccan Football Federation) AS FAR
8	MF	Salma Amani	28 November 1989 (aged 33)			(French Football Federation) Metz
9	FW	Ibtissam Jraïdi	9 December 1992 (aged 30)			(Saudi Arabian Football Federation) Al Ahli
10	MF	Najat Badri	19 May 1988 (aged 35)			(Royal Moroccan Football Federation) AS FAR
11	MF	Fatima Tagnaout	20 January 1999 (aged 24)			(Royal Moroccan Football Federation) AS FAR
12	GK	Assia Zouhair	29 April 1991 (aged 32)			(Royal Moroccan Football Federation) CAK
13	DF	Sabah Seghir	27 September 2000 (aged 22)			(Italian Football Federation) Napoli
14	DF	Rkia Mazrouai	11 May 2002 (aged 21)			(Royal Belgian Football Association) Charleroi
15	FW	Fatima Zohra Gharbi	15 May 2001 (aged 22)			(Royal Spanish Football Federation) Europa
16	MF	Anissa Lahmari	17 February 1997 (aged 26)			(French Football Federation) Guingamp
17	DF	Hanane Aït El Haj	2 November 1994 (aged 28)			(Royal Moroccan Football Federation) AS FAR
18	FW	Kenza Chapelle	22 August 2002 (aged 20)			(French Football Federation) Nantes
19	FW	Sakina Ouzraoui Diki	29 August 2001 (aged 21)			(Royal Belgian Football Association) Club YLA
20	FW	Sofia Bouftini	25 January 2002 (aged 21)			(Royal Moroccan Football Federation) RS Berkane
21	DF	Yasmin Mrabet	8 August 1999 (aged 23)			(Royal Spanish Football Federation) Levante Las Planas
22	GK	Inès Arouaissa	30 June 2001 (aged 22)			(French Football Federation) Cannes
23	FW	Rosella Ayane	16 March 1996 (aged 27)			(The Football Association) Tottenham Hotspur

=== South Korea ===
Head coach: (England) Colin Bell

The final 23-player squad was announced on 5 July 2023.

No.	Pos.	Player	Date of birth (age)	Caps	Goals	Club
1	GK	Yoon Young-geul	28 October 1987 (aged 35)	27	0	(Swedish Football Association) BK Häcken
2	DF	Choo Hyo-joo	29 July 2000 (aged 22)	30	3	(Korea Football Association) Suwon FC
3	DF	Hong Hye-ji	25 August 1996 (aged 26)	38	1	(Korea Football Association) Incheon Hyundai Steel
4	DF	Shim Seo-yeon	15 April 1989 (aged 34)	76	0	(Korea Football Association) Suwon FC
5	MF	Kim Yun-ji	1 June 1989 (aged 34)	8	0	(Korea Football Association) Suwon FC
6	DF	Lim Seon-joo	27 November 1990 (aged 32)	103	6	(Korea Football Association) Incheon Hyundai Steel
7	FW	Son Hwa-yeon	15 March 1997 (aged 26)	48	8	(Korea Football Association) Incheon Hyundai Steel
8	MF	Cho So-hyun	24 June 1988 (aged 35)	144	25	(The Football Association) Tottenham Hotspur
9	MF	Lee Geum-min	7 April 1994 (aged 29)	80	26	(The Football Association) Brighton & Hove Albion
10	MF	Ji So-yun	21 February 1991 (aged 32)	144	66	(Korea Football Association) Suwon FC
11	FW	Choe Yu-ri	16 September 1994 (aged 28)	50	9	(Korea Football Association) Incheon Hyundai Steel
12	FW	Moon Mi-ra	28 February 1992 (aged 31)	29	16	(Korea Football Association) Suwon FC
13	FW	Park Eun-sun	25 December 1986 (aged 36)	42	20	(Korea Football Association) Seoul WFC
14	MF	Jeon Eun-ha	28 January 1993 (aged 30)	13	0	(Korea Football Association) Suwon FC
15	MF	Chun Ga-ram	19 October 2002 (aged 20)	4	0	(Korea Football Association) Hwacheon KSPO
16	DF	Jang Sel-gi	31 May 1994 (aged 29)	89	12	(Korea Football Association) Incheon Hyundai Steel
17	DF	Lee Young-ju	22 April 1992 (aged 31)	55	2	(Royal Spanish Football Federation) Madrid CFF
18	GK	Kim Jung-mi	16 October 1984 (aged 38)	135	0	(Korea Football Association) Incheon Hyundai Steel
19	FW	Casey Phair	29 June 2007 (aged 16)	0	0	(United States Soccer Federation) Players Development Academy
20	DF	Kim Hye-ri (captain)	25 June 1990 (aged 33)	111	1	(Korea Football Association) Incheon Hyundai Steel
21	GK	Ryu Ji-soo	3 September 1997 (aged 25)	0	0	(Korea Football Association) Seoul WFC
22	MF	Bae Ye-bin	7 December 2004 (aged 18)	2	0	(Korea Football Association) Uiduk University
23	FW	Kang Chae-rim	23 March 1998 (aged 25)	24	6	(Korea Football Association) Incheon Hyundai Steel

== Statistics ==
Note: Only the final squad list of each national team is taken into consideration.

=== Player representation by club ===
Players	Clubs
17	(Spain) Barcelona
16	(England) Chelsea
13	(England) Arsenal (France) Lyon (England) Manchester City (France) Paris Saint-Germain (Spain) Real Madrid
12	(Portugal) Benfica (Italy) Juventus (Italy) Roma (Germany) VfL Wolfsburg
9	(England) Everton (England) Manchester United (China) Wuhan Jianghan University

=== Player representation by league system ===
League systems with 14 or more players represented are listed.

Country	Players	Outside national squad
England	106	86
United States	86	64
Spain	73	52
France	62	47
Italy	40	18
Germany	35	15
Portugal	23	6
Sweden	23	15
Vietnam	22	0
China	20	3
South Korea	19	1
Brazil	18	11
Australia	17	15
Costa Rica	17	4
South Africa	16	0
Norway	15	6
Zambia	14	0
Japan	14	0

=== Coaches representation by country ===
Coaches in bold represented their own country.

No.	Country	Coaches
3	France	Nicolas Delépine (Haiti), Reynald Pedros (Morocco), **Hervé Renard**
3	Netherlands	**Andries Jonker**, Vera Pauw (Republic of Ireland), Sarina Wiegman (England)
3	Sweden	**Peter Gerhardsson**, Tony Gustavsson (Australia), Pia Sundhage (Brazil)
2	England	Colin Bell (South Korea), Bev Priestman (Canada)
2	Germany	Inka Grings (Switzerland), **Martina Voss-Tecklenburg**
1	Argentina	**Germán Portanova**
1	Australia	Alen Stajcic (Philippines)
1	China	**Shui Qingxia**
1	Colombia	**Nelson Abadía**
1	Costa Rica	**Amelia Valverde**
1	Czech Republic	Jitka Klimková (New Zealand)
1	Denmark	**Lars Søndergaard**
1	Italy	**Milena Bertolini**
1	Jamaica	**Lorne Donaldson**
1	Japan	**Futoshi Ikeda**
1	Mexico	Ignacio Quintana (Panama)
1	North Macedonia	Vlatko Andonovski (United States)
1	Norway	**Hege Riise**
1	Portugal	**Francisco Neto**
1	South Africa	**Desiree Ellis**
1	Spain	**Jorge Vilda**
1	United States	Randy Waldrum (Nigeria)
1	Vietnam	**Mai Đức Chung**
1	Zambia	**Bruce Mwape**

=== Average age of squads ===
Nation	Avg. Age	Oldest player	Youngest player
New Zealand	26.9	Ali Riley (35 years, 263 days)	Milly Clegg (17 years, 261 days)
Norway	26.4	Maren Mjelde (33 years, 256 days)	Mathilde Harviken (21 years, 203 days)
Philippines	24.9	Tahnai Annis (34 years, 30 days)	Kaiya Jota (17 years, 165 days)
Switzerland	27	Gaëlle Thalmann (37 years, 183 days)	Livia Peng (21 years, 128 days)
Australia	27.4	Aivi Luik (38 years, 124 days)	Mary Fowler (20 years, 156 days)
Canada	27	Christine Sinclair (40 years, 38 days)	Olivia Smith (18 years, 349 days)
Nigeria	26.4	Onome Ebi (40 years, 73 days)	Rofiat Imuran (19 years, 33 days)
Republic of Ireland	28.5	Niamh Fahey (35 years, 280 days)	Abbie Larkin (18 years, 84 days)
Costa Rica	25.6	Carol Sánchez (37 years, 95 days)	Sheika Scott (16 years, 271 days)
Japan	24.8	Saki Kumagai (32 years, 276 days)	Maika Hamano (19 years, 72 days)
Spain	25.3	Jennifer Hermoso (33 years, 72 days)	Salma Paralluelo (19 years, 249 days)
Zambia	23.8	Susan Banda (33 years, 14 days)	Esther Banda (18 years, 241 days)
China	26.9	Zhang Rui (34 years, 184 days)	Pan Hongyan (18 years, 202 days)
Denmark	26.1	Sanne Troelsgaard Nielsen (34 years, 339 days)	Kathrine Møller Kühl (20 years, 106 days)
England	25.8	Laura Coombs (32 years, 172 days)	Katie Robinson (20 years, 346 days)
Haiti	22.3	Roselord Borgella (30 years, 110 days)	Darlina Joseph (19 years, 217 days)
Netherlands	25.7	Sherida Spitse (33 years, 52 days)	Wieke Kaptein (17 years, 325 days)
Portugal	27	Carolina Mendes (35 years, 235 days)	Francisca Nazareth (20 years, 245 days)
United States	28.3	Megan Rapinoe (38 years, 15 days)	Alyssa Thompson (18 years, 255 days)
Vietnam	27	Trần Thị Thùy Trang (34 years, 346 days)	Vũ Thị Hoa (19 years, 256 days)
Brazil	27.5	Marta (37 years, 151 days)	Lauren (20 years, 310 days)
France	26.8	Eugénie Le Sommer (34 years, 63 days)	Laurina Fazer (19 years, 280 days)
Jamaica	24.9	Rebecca Spencer (32 years, 148 days)	Solai Washington (17 years, 292 days)
Panama	24.6	Farissa Córdoba (34 years, 20 days)	Deysiré Salazar (19 years, 77 days)
Argentina	27.2	Vanina Correa (39 years, 340 days)	Lara Esponda (17 years, 254 days)
Italy	25.9	Cristiana Girelli (33 years, 88 days)	Giulia Dragoni (16 years, 255 days)
South Africa	27	Noko Matlou (37 years, 293 days)	Wendy Shongwe (20 years, 183 days)
Sweden	28.5	Caroline Seger (38 years, 123 days)	Anna Sandberg (20 years, 58 days)
Colombia	25.1	Sandra Sepúlveda (35 years, 139 days)	Ana María Guzmán (18 years, 39 days)
Germany	26.3	Marina Hegering (33 years, 94 days)	Jule Brand (20 years, 277 days)
Morocco	25.6	Najat Badri (35 years, 62 days)	Sarah Kassi (19 years, 314 days)
South Korea	28.9	Kim Jung-mi (38 years, 277 days)	Casey Phair (16 years, 21 days)
