= 2023 Women's Revelations Cup squads =

The 2023 Women's Revelations Cup was the second edition of the Women's Revelations Cup, an international women's football tournament consisting of a series of friendly games held in León, Mexico from 15 to 21 February 2023. The four national teams involved in the tournament registered a squad of 23 players.

The age listed for each player is as 15 February 2023, the inauguration day of the tournament. The numbers of caps and goals listed for each player do not include any matches played after the start of tournament. A flag is included for coaches that are of a different nationality than their own national team.

== Squads ==
=== Colombia ===
Coach: Nelson Abadía

The squad was announced on 7 February 2023. On 13 February 2023, Leicy Santos withdrew from the squad due to a hamstring injury, and was replaced by María Camila Reyes.

No.	Pos.	Player	Date of birth (age)	Club
1	GK	Catalina Pérez	8 November 1994 (aged 28)	(Royal Spanish Football Federation) Real Betis
2	DF	Manuela Vanegas	9 November 2000 (aged 22)	(Royal Spanish Football Federation) Real Sociedad
3	DF	Daniela Arias	31 August 1994 (aged 28)	(Colombian Football Federation) América de Cali
4	MF	Diana Ospina	3 March 1989 (aged 33)	(Colombian Football Federation) América de Cali
5	MF	Lorena Bedoya	6 October 1997 (aged 25)	(Brazilian Football Confederation) Real Brasília
6	MF	Daniela Montoya	22 August 1990 (aged 32)	(Colombian Football Federation) Atlético Nacional
7	MF	María Camila Reyes	11 May 2002 (aged 20)	(Colombian Football Federation) Independiente Santa Fe
8	MF	Marcela Restrepo	10 November 1995 (aged 27)	(Royal Spanish Football Federation) Dux Logroño
9	MF	Mayra Ramírez	23 March 1999 (aged 23)	(Royal Spanish Football Federation) Levante
11	FW	Catalina Usme	25 December 1989 (aged 33)	(Colombian Football Federation) América de Cali
12	GK	Sandra Sepúlveda	3 March 1988 (aged 34)	(Colombian Football Federation) Independiente Medellín
15	DF	Ana María Guzmán	11 June 2005 (aged 17)	(Colombian Football Federation) Deportivo Pereira
16	MF	Lady Andrade	10 January 1992 (aged 31)	(Brazilian Football Confederation) Real Brasília
17	DF	Carolina Arias	2 September 1990 (aged 32)	(Colombian Football Federation) Atlético Junior
18	FW	Linda Caicedo	25 February 2005 (aged 17)	(Colombian Football Federation) Deportivo Cali
19	DF	Jorelyn Carabalí	18 May 1997 (aged 25)	(Brazilian Football Confederation) Atlético Mineiro
20	MF	Mónica Ramos	14 October 1998 (aged 24)	(Brazilian Football Confederation) Grêmio
21	FW	Yisela Cuesta	27 September 1991 (aged 31)	(Brazilian Football Confederation) Ferroviária
22	DF	Daniela Caracas	25 April 1997 (aged 25)	(Royal Spanish Football Federation) Espanyol
23	FW	Elexa Bahr	26 May 1998 (aged 24)	(Colombian Football Federation) América de Cali
24	FW	Ivonne Chacón	12 October 1997 (aged 25)	(Royal Spanish Football Federation) Valencia
25	GK	Katherine Tapia	7 December 1992 (aged 30)	(Brazilian Football Confederation) Palmeiras
27	FW	Ingrid Guerra	2 April 2003 (aged 19)	(Brazilian Football Confederation) Atlético Mineiro

=== Costa Rica ===
Coach: Amelia Valverde

The squad was announced on 9 February 2023. On 13 February 2023, María Paula Porras withdrew due to injury and was replaced by Yaniela Arias.

No.	Pos.	Player	Date of birth (age)	Club
1	GK	Noelia Bermúdez	20 September 1994 (aged 28)	(Costa Rican Football Federation) Alajuelense
2	DF	Gabriela Guillén	1 March 1992 (aged 30)	(Costa Rican Football Federation) Alajuelense
3	DF	María Coto	2 March 1998 (aged 24)	(Costa Rican Football Federation) Alajuelense
4	DF	Mariana Benavides	26 December 1994 (aged 28)	(Costa Rican Football Federation) Saprissa
5	MF	Yaniela Arias	25 April 1998 (aged 24)	(French Football Federation) Monaco
6	DF	Carol Sánchez	16 April 1986 (aged 36)	(Costa Rican Football Federation) Sporting San José
7	FW	Melissa Herrera	10 October 1996 (aged 26)	(French Football Federation) Bordeaux
8	DF	Daniela Cruz	8 March 1991 (aged 31)	(Mexican Football Federation) Atlas
9	FW	Carolina Venegas	28 September 1991 (aged 31)	(Mexican Football Federation) Atlas
10	MF	Shirley Cruz	28 August 1985 (aged 37)	(Costa Rican Football Federation) Alajuelense
11	MF	Raquel Rodríguez	28 October 1993 (aged 29)	(United States Soccer Federation) Portland Thorns
12	DF	Lixy Rodríguez	4 November 1990 (aged 32)	(Mexican Football Federation) León
13	MF	Emilie Valenciano	15 February 1997 (aged 26)	(Israel Football Association) Ramat HaSharon
14	MF	Priscila Chinchilla	11 July 2001 (aged 21)	(Scottish Football Association) Glasgow City
15	MF	Cristín Granados	19 August 1989 (aged 33)	(Costa Rican Football Federation) Sporting San José
16	MF	Katherine Alvarado	11 April 1991 (aged 31)	(Costa Rican Football Federation) Saprissa
17	FW	Yerling Ovares	17 January 2002 (aged 21)	(Costa Rican Football Federation) Sporting San José
18	GK	Priscilla Tapia	2 May 1991 (aged 31)	(Costa Rican Football Federation) Herediano
19	MF	Alexandra Pinell	18 October 2002 (aged 20)	(Costa Rican Football Federation) Alajuelense
20	DF	Fabiola Villalobos	13 March 1998 (aged 24)	(Costa Rican Football Federation) Alajuelense
21	MF	Gloriana Villalobos	20 August 1999 (aged 23)	(Costa Rican Football Federation) Saprissa
22	MF	Sheika Scott	22 October 2006 (aged 16)	(Costa Rican Football Federation) Alajuelense
23	GK	Daniela Solera	21 July 1997 (aged 25)	(Costa Rican Football Federation) Sporting San José
24	FW	Yoanka Villanueva	21 August 1996 (aged 26)	(Costa Rican Football Federation) Dimas Escazú

=== Mexico ===
Coach: (Spain) Pedro López

The squad was announced on 8 February 2023. On 14 February 2023, the day before the beginning of the tournament, Celeste Espino withdrew due to an injury and was replaced by Cecilia Santiago.

No.	Pos.	Player	Date of birth (age)	Club
1	GK	Emily Alvarado	9 June 1998 (aged 24)	(French Football Federation) Reims
2	DF	Kenti Robles	15 February 1991 (aged 32)	(Royal Spanish Football Federation) Real Madrid
3	DF	Cristina Ferral	16 February 1993 (aged 29)	(Mexican Football Federation) UANL
4	DF	Jocelyn Orejel	14 November 1996 (aged 26)	(Mexican Football Federation) América
5	DF	Karina Rodríguez	2 March 1999 (aged 23)	(Mexican Football Federation) América
6	MF	Alexia Delgado	9 December 1999 (aged 23)	(Mexican Football Federation) Cruz Azul
7	FW	Kiana Palacios	1 October 1996 (aged 26)	(Mexican Football Federation) América
8	MF	Carolina Jaramillo	19 March 1994 (aged 28)	(Mexican Football Federation) Guadalajara
9	FW	Charlyn Corral	11 September 1991 (aged 31)	(Mexican Football Federation) Pachuca
10	MF	Stephany Mayor	23 September 1991 (aged 31)	(Mexican Football Federation) UANL
11	FW	Jacqueline Ovalle	19 October 1999 (aged 23)	(Mexican Football Federation) UANL
12	GK	Itzel González	14 August 1994 (aged 28)	(Mexican Football Federation) América
13	FW	Daniela Espinosa	13 July 1999 (aged 23)	(Mexican Football Federation) Tijuana
14	DF	Greta Espinoza	5 June 1995 (aged 27)	(Mexican Football Federation) UANL
15	FW	Scarlett Camberos	20 November 2000 (aged 22)	(Mexican Football Federation) América
16	MF	Karla Nieto	9 January 1995 (aged 28)	(Mexican Football Federation) Pachuca
17	FW	Myra Delgadillo	9 December 1995 (aged 27)	(Mexican Football Federation) Juárez
18	MF	Aylín Avilez	18 May 2003 (aged 19)	(Mexican Football Federation) Monterrey
19	DF	Karol Bernal	2 February 2003 (aged 20)	(Mexican Football Federation) Monterrey
20	MF	Natalia Mauleón	4 February 2002 (aged 21)	(Mexican Football Federation) América
21	GK	Cecilia Santiago	19 October 1994 (aged 28)	(Mexican Football Federation) UANL
22	MF	Diana García	11 November 1999 (aged 23)	(Mexican Football Federation) Monterrey
23	DF	Nicolette Hernández	17 February 1999 (aged 23)	(Mexican Football Federation) América
24	DF	Anika Rodríguez	4 January 1997 (aged 26)	(Mexican Football Federation) UANL
25	FW	Adriana Iturbide	27 March 1993 (aged 29)	(Mexican Football Federation) Guadalajara
27	DF	Miah Zuazua	27 April 1999 (aged 23)	(Mexican Football Federation) Juárez

=== Nigeria ===
Coach: (United States) Randy Waldrum

The squad was announced on 26 January 2023.

No.	Pos.	Player	Date of birth (age)	Club
1	GK	Yewande Balogun	28 September 1989 (aged 33)	(French Football Federation) Saint-Étienne
2	DF	Ashleigh Plumptre	8 May 1998 (aged 24)	(The Football Association) Leicester City
3	DF	Osinachi Ohale	21 December 1991 (aged 31)	(Royal Spanish Football Federation) Deportivo Alavés
4	DF	Glory Ogbonna	25 December 1998 (aged 24)	(Turkish Football Federation) ALG Spor
5	DF	Onome Ebi	8 May 1983 (aged 39)	(Royal Spanish Football Federation) Levante Las Planas
6	FW	Uchenna Kanu	20 June 1997 (aged 25)	(Mexican Football Federation) UANL
7	MF	Toni Payne	22 April 1995 (aged 27)	(Royal Spanish Football Federation) Sevilla
8	FW	Asisat Oshoala	9 October 1994 (aged 28)	(Royal Spanish Football Federation) Barcelona
9	FW	Ifeoma Onumonu	25 February 1994 (aged 28)	(United States Soccer Federation) NJ/NY Gotham
10	MF	Christy Ucheibe	25 December 2000 (aged 22)	(Portuguese Football Federation) Benfica
11	MF	Regina Otu	5 August 1996 (aged 26)	(French Football Federation) Saint-Étienne
12	DF	Akudo Ogbonna	9 April 2000 (aged 22)	(Nigeria Football Federation) Rivers Angels
13	MF	Ngozi Okobi-Okeoghene	14 December 1993 (aged 29)	(Swedish Football Association) Eskilstuna United
14	DF	Oluwatosin Demehin	13 March 2002 (aged 20)	(French Football Federation) Reims
15	MF	Rasheedat Ajibade	8 December 1999 (aged 23)	(Royal Spanish Football Federation) Atlético Madrid
16	GK	Chiamaka Nnadozie	8 December 2000 (aged 22)	(French Football Federation) Paris FC
17	FW	Francisca Ordega	19 October 1993 (aged 29)	(Russian Football Union) CSKA Moscow
18	MF	Halimatu Ayinde	16 May 1995 (aged 27)	(Swedish Football Association) Rosengård
19	FW	Chinwendu Ihezuo	30 April 1997 (aged 25)	(Mexican Football Federation) Monterrey
20	DF	Michelle Alozie	28 April 1997 (aged 25)	(United States Soccer Federation) Houston Dash
21	FW	Esther Okoronkwo	27 March 1997 (aged 25)	(French Football Federation) Saint-Étienne
22	DF	Rofiat Imuran	17 June 2004 (aged 18)	(French Football Federation) Reims
23	MF	Jennifer Echegini	22 March 2001 (aged 21)	(United States Soccer Federation) Florida State Seminoles

== Player representation ==
=== By club ===
Clubs with 3 or more players represented are listed.

Players	Club
7	(Costa Rica) Alajuelense, (Mexico) América, (Mexico) UANL
4	(Colombia) América de Cali, (Costa Rica) Sporting San José, (Mexico) Monterrey
3	(Costa Rica) Saprissa, (France) Reims, (France) Saint-Étienne

=== By club nationality ===
Players	Clubs
29	Mexico
16	Costa Rica
12	Spain
10	Colombia
9	France
7	Brazil
4	United States
2	Sweden
1	England, Israel, Nigeria, Portugal, Russia, Scotland, Turkey

=== By club federation ===
Players	Federation
49	CONCACAF
29	UEFA
17	CONMEBOL
1	CAF

=== By representatives of domestic league ===
National squad	Players
Mexico	24
Costa Rica	16
Colombia	10
Nigeria	1
