= Yewande Balogun =

Nigerian footballer (born 1989)

Personal information
- Full name: Zainab Yewande Omoyiola Balogun
- Date of birth: 28 September 1989 (age 37)
- Place of birth: Washington, D.C., United States
- Height: 1.73 m (5 ft 8 in)
- Position: Goalkeeper

Team information
- Current team: Saint-Étienne
- Number: 1

College career
Years	Team	Apps	(Gls)
2007–2011	Maryland Terrapins		

Senior career*
Years	Team	Apps	(Gls)
2022–2025	Saint-Étienne	2	(0)

International career^{‡}
2023	Nigeria	1	(0)
- * Club domestic league appearances and goals as of 28 May 2023. ‡ National team caps and goals as of 11 April 2023.

Zainab Yewande Omoyila Balogun (born 28 September 1989) is a Nigerian former footballer who played as a goalkeeper for Première Ligue club Saint-Étienne. She was born in the United States but represented Nigeria at the international level.

== Playing career ==
As a goalkeeper for Nigeria's Super Falcons, the national women's football team, she was part of the club that competed in the 2023 FIFA Women's World Cup, held in Australia and New Zealand, where she made one appearance.

== Retirement ==
At 34 years old, Balogun decided to retire from professional football, stating that her body signaled it was time to close this chapter of her life.

== Participate in ==
2023 FIFA Women's World Cup squads

=== Nigeria ===
Head coach: (United States) Randy Waldrum

The final 23-player squad was announced on 16 June 2023.

No.	Pos.	Player	Date of birth (age)	Caps	Goals	Club
1	GK	Tochukwu Oluehi	2 May 1987 (aged 36)			(Turkish Football Federation) Hakkarigücü Spor
2	DF	Ashleigh Plumptre	8 May 1998 (aged 25)	11	0	unattached
3	DF	Osinachi Ohale	21 December 1991 (aged 31)	59	2	(Royal Spanish Football Federation) Alavés
4	DF	Glory Ogbonna	25 December 1998 (aged 24)	22	0	(Turkish Football Federation) Beşiktaş
5	DF	Onome Ebi (captain)	8 May 1983 (aged 40)	107	3	(Nigeria Football Federation) Abia Angels
6	FW	Ifeoma Onumonu	25 February 1994 (aged 29)	14	4	(United States Soccer Federation) NJ/NY Gotham FC
7	MF	Toni Payne	22 April 1995 (aged 28)	23	1	(Royal Spanish Football Federation) Sevilla
8	FW	Asisat Oshoala	9 October 1994 (aged 28)	41	30	(Royal Spanish Football Federation) Barcelona
9	FW	Desire Oparanozie	17 December 1993 (aged 29)	38	23	(Chinese Football Association) Wuhan Jianghan University
10	MF	Christy Ucheibe	25 December 2000 (aged 22)	10	1	(Portuguese Football Federation) Benfica
11	FW	Gift Monday	9 December 2001 (aged 21)	12	2	(Royal Spanish Football Federation) Granadilla Tenerife
12	FW	Uchenna Kanu	20 June 1997 (aged 26)	18	6	(United States Soccer Federation) Racing Louisville
13	MF	Deborah Abiodun	2 November 2003 (aged 19)	3	0	(Nigeria Football Federation) Rivers Angels
14	DF	Oluwatosin Demehin	13 March 2002 (aged 21)	8	0	(French Football Federation) Reims
15	MF	Rasheedat Ajibade	8 December 1999 (aged 23)	26	9	(Royal Spanish Football Federation) Atlético Madrid
16	GK	Chiamaka Nnadozie	8 December 2000 (aged 22)	19	0	(French Football Federation) Paris FC
17	FW	Francisca Ordega	19 October 1993 (aged 29)	34	7	(Russian Football Union) CSKA Moscow
18	MF	Halimatu Ayinde	16 May 1995 (aged 28)	12	0	(Swedish Football Association) Rosengård
19	MF	Jennifer Echegini	22 March 2001 (aged 22)	6	1	(United States Soccer Federation) Florida State Seminoles
20	DF	Rofiat Imuran	17 June 2004 (aged 19)	7	0	(French Football Federation) Reims
21	FW	Esther Okoronkwo	27 March 1997 (aged 26)	9	3	(French Football Federation) Saint-Étienne
22	DF	Michelle Alozie	28 April 1997 (aged 26)	21	1	(United States Soccer Federation) Houston Dash
23	GK	Yewande Balogun	28 September 1989 (aged 33)	1	0	(French Football Federation) Saint-Étienne

== Group B ==
Pos	Team	Pld	W	D	L	GF	GA	GD	Pts	Qualification
1	Australia (H)	3	2	0	1	7	3	+4	6	Advance to knockout stage
2	Nigeria	3	1	2	0	3	2	+1	5	Advance to knockout stage
3	Canada	3	1	1	1	2	5	−3	4	
4	Republic of Ireland	3	0	1	2	1	3	−2	1	

Source: FIFA
(H) Hosts
20 July 2023
20:00 UTC+10

Australia	1–0	Republic of Ireland
Catley 52' (pen.)	Report

Stadium Australia, Sydney
Attendance: 75,784
Referee: Edina Alves Batista (Brazil)
21 July 2023
12:30 UTC+10

Nigeria	0–0	Canada
	Report

Melbourne Rectangular Stadium, Melbourne
Attendance: 21,410
Referee: Lina Lehtovaara (Finland)

26 July 2023
20:00 UTC+8

Canada	2–1	Republic of Ireland
Connolly 45+5' (o.g.); Leon 53'	Report	McCabe 4'

Perth Rectangular Stadium, Perth
Attendance: 17,065
Referee: Laura Fortunato (Argentina)
27 July 2023
20:00 UTC+10

Australia	2–3	Nigeria
Van Egmond 45+1'; Kennedy 90+10'	Report	Kanu 45+6'; Ohale 65'; Oshoala 72'

Lang Park, Brisbane
Attendance: 49,156
Referee: Esther Staubli (Switzerland)

31 July 2023
20:00 UTC+10

Canada	0–4	Australia
	Report	Raso 9', 39'; Fowler 58'; Catley 90+4' (pen.)

Melbourne Rectangular Stadium, Melbourne
Attendance: 27,706
Referee: Stéphanie Frappart (France)
31 July 2023
20:00 UTC+10

Republic of Ireland	0–0	Nigeria
	Report

Lang Park, Brisbane
Attendance: 24,884
Referee: Katia García (Mexico)

== Bracket ==
Round of 16
5 August – Auckland
Switzerland	1
Spain	5
6 August – Sydney (SFS)
Netherlands	2
South Africa	0
5 August – Wellington
Japan	3
Norway	1
6 August – Melbourne
Sweden (p)	0 (5)
United States	0 (4)
7 August – Sydney (SA)
Australia	2
Denmark	0
8 August – Adelaide
France	4
Morocco	0
7 August – Brisbane
England (p)	0 (4)
Nigeria	0 (2)
8 August – Melbourne
Colombia	1
Jamaica	0

Quarter-finals
11 August – Wellington
Spain (a.e.t.)	2
Netherlands	1
11 August – Auckland
Japan	1
Sweden	2
12 August – Brisbane
Australia (p)	0 (7)
France	0 (6)
12 August – Sydney (SA)
England	2
Colombia	1

Semi-finals
15 August – Auckland
Spain	2
Sweden	1
16 August – Sydney (SA)
Australia	1
England	3

Final
20 August – Sydney (SA)
Spain	1
England	0
Third place play-off
19 August – Brisbane
Sweden	2
Australia	0

== Round of 16 ==
5 August 2023
17:00 UTC+12

Switzerland	1–5	Spain
Codina 11' (o.g.)	Report	Bonmatí 5', 36'; Redondo 17'; Codina 45'; Hermoso 70'

Eden Park, Auckland
Attendance: 43,217
Referee: Cheryl Foster (Wales)

5 August 2023
20:00 UTC+12

Japan	3–1	Norway
Syrstad Engen 15' (o.g.); Shimizu 50'; Miyazawa 81'	Report	Reiten 20'

Wellington Regional Stadium, Wellington
Attendance: 33,042
Referee: Edina Alves Batista (Brazil)

6 August 2023
12:00 UTC+10

Netherlands	2–0	South Africa
Roord 9'; Beerensteyn 68'	Report

Sydney Football Stadium, Sydney
Attendance: 40,233
Referee: Yoshimi Yamashita (Japan)

6 August 2023
19:00 UTC+10

Sweden	0–0 (a.e.t.)	United States
	Report
Penalties
Rolfö (penalty scored); Rubensson (penalty scored); Björn (penalty missed); Blomqvist (penalty missed); Bennison (penalty scored); Eriksson (penalty scored); Hurtig (penalty scored)	5–4	(penalty scored) Sullivan; (penalty scored) Horan; (penalty scored) Mewis; (penalty missed) Rapinoe; (penalty missed) Smith; (penalty scored) Naeher; (penalty missed) O'Hara

Melbourne Rectangular Stadium, Melbourne
Attendance: 27,706
Referee: Stéphanie Frappart (France)

7 August 2023
17:30 UTC+10

England	0–0 (a.e.t.)	Nigeria
	Report
Penalties
Stanway (penalty missed); England (penalty scored); Daly (penalty scored); Greenwood (penalty scored); Kelly (penalty scored)	4–2	(penalty missed) Oparanozie; (penalty missed) Alozie; (penalty scored) Ajibade; (penalty scored) Ucheibe

Lang Park, Brisbane
Attendance: 49,461
Referee: Melissa Borjas (Honduras)

7 August 2023
20:30 UTC+10

Australia	2–0	Denmark
Foord 29'; Raso 70'	Report

Stadium Australia, Sydney
Attendance: 75,784
Referee: Rebecca Welch (England)

8 August 2023
18:00 UTC+10

Colombia	1–0	Jamaica
Usme 51'	Report

Melbourne Rectangular Stadium, Melbourne
Attendance: 27,706
Referee: Kate Jacewicz (Australia)

8 August 2023
20:30 UTC+9:30

France	4–0	Morocco
Diani 15'; Dali 20'; Le Sommer 23', 70'	Report

Hindmarsh Stadium, Adelaide
Attendance: 13,557
Referee: Tori Penso (United States)
