= Yaniela Arias =

Costa Rican footballer (born 1998)

Personal information
- Full name: Yaniela Arias Álvarez
- Date of birth: 25 April 1998 (age 28)
- Position: Midfielder

Team information
- Current team: Dimas Escazú
- Number: 21

Senior career*
Years	Team	Apps	(Gls)
2020–	Dimas Escazú	32	(4)

International career^{‡}
2014	Costa Rica U17	2	(0)
2018	Costa Rica U20	2	(0)
2021–	Costa Rica	1	(0)
- * Club domestic league appearances and goals as of 21 May 2021. ‡ National team caps and goals as of 23 February 2021.

Yaniela Arias Álvarez (born 25 April 1998) is a Costa Rican footballer who plays as a midfielder for Dimas Escazú and the Costa Rica women's national team.

== Club career ==
Arias has played for Dimas Escazú in Costa Rica.

== International career ==
Arias represented Costa Rica at the 2014 FIFA U-17 Women's World Cup and the 2018 CONCACAF Women's U-20 Championship. She made her senior debut on 23 February 2021 as a 67th-minute substitution in a 0–0 friendly away draw against Mexico.
