= Leticia Lungu =

Zambian footballer (born 2004)

Personal information
- Date of birth: 7 August 2004 (age 22)
- Position: Goalkeeper

Team information
- Current team: ZESCO Ndola Girls

Senior career*
Years	Team	Apps	(Gls)
- ZESCO Ndola Girls

International career
- Zambia
- * Club domestic league appearances and goals

Leticia Lungu (born 7 August 2004) is a Zambian footballer who plays as a goalkeeper for ZESCO Ndola Girls and the Zambia women's national team.
