= Pan Hongyan =

Chinese association football player

Personal information
- Date of birth: 30 December 2004 (age 21)
- Height: 1.80 m (5 ft 11 in)
- Position: Goalkeeper

Team information
- Current team: Beijing

International career
Years	Team	Apps	(Gls)
2023–	China	0	(0)

Pan Hongyan (born 30 December 2004) is a Chinese professional association football player who plays as a goalkeeper for Beijing in the Chinese Women's Super League. Dou Jiaxing was selected for the Chinese national team squad for the 2023 FIFA Women's World Cup.
