= Glory Ogbonna =

Nigerian footballer

Personal information
- Full name: Glory Akumbu Ogbonna
- Date of birth: 25 December 1998 (age 27)
- Place of birth: Nigeria
- Height: 1.74 m (5 ft 9 in)
- Position: Defender

Team information
- Current team: F.C. Kiryat Gat
- Number: 44

Youth career
- –2019: Edo Queens

Senior career*
| Years | Team | Apps | (Gls) |
| 2019–2021 | Edo Queens | | |
| 2021 | Umeå IK | 11 | (0) |
| 2022 | Santa Teresa | 14 | (0) |
| 2022–2023 | ALG Spor | 7 | (1) |
| 2023-2025 | Beşiktaş JK | | |
| 2025- | F.C. Kiryat Gat | | |

International career^{‡}
| 2016–2018 | Nigeria U20 | 4 | (0) |
| 2018– | Nigeria | 19 | (0) |
- * Club domestic league appearances and goals as of 16 October 2022 ‡ National team caps and goals as of 16 August 2026

Glory Akumbu Ogbonna (born 25 December 1998) is a Nigerian footballer who plays as a defender for the Turkish club Beşiktaş JK and the Nigeria women's national team. She has formerly played with Edo Queens in the Nigeria Women Football League.

== Club career ==
On 16 July 2021, while in Austria with the rest of Super Falcons of Nigeria in camp for Aisha Buhari's invitational tournament, a Umeå-based professional association football club that plays in Elitettan, the second tier of women's football in Sweden club, Umeå IK announced the capturing of Glory as their new player until the end of the 2022 season.

After playing in Sweden, the left-back moved to Turkey and signed with the Gaziantep-based league champion club ALG Spor on 13 August 2022. On 18 August 2022, she debuted in the 2022–23 UEFA Women's Champions League.

On 3 February 2023, she was transferred to Beşiktaş JK arriving from league leaders ALG Spor for the remainder of that campaign. She went on to spend two seasons with the club before leaving in June 2025 upon the expiry of her contract.

On 4 September 2026, Ogbonna rejoined Beşiktaş.

== International career ==
At junior level, Ogbonna represented Nigeria at FIFA U-20 Women's World Cup in 2016 and 2018.

At the 2018 WAFU Women's Cup, Nigerian head coach, Thomas Dennerby stated that he was most impressed by the performance of Ogbonna after the competition. After her debut for the senior team at the tournament, she was invited for 2018 Africa Women Cup of Nations qualifiers, and subsequently making the squad to the main tournament.

On 16 June 2023, she was included in the 23-player Nigerian squad for the FIFA Women's World Cup 2023.
