= 2014 CONCACAF Women's Championship qualification =

The 2014 CONCACAF Women's Championship Qualification was a series of women's association football tournaments that determined the participants for the 2014 CONCACAF Women's Championship. Twenty-eight national teams entered the qualification for 6 spots, but three withdrew before playing any match. The qualification was organised by CONCACAF, the Central American Football Union (UNCAF), and the Caribbean Football Union (CFU). Because the 2014 CONCACAF Women's Championship also served as the CONCACAF qualifying tournament for the 2015 FIFA Women's World Cup, the Championship qualification also served as the first World Cup qualifying stage. Martinique and Guadeloupe were not eligible for World Cup qualification, as they were only members of CONCACAF and not FIFA.

== North America (NAFU) ==
As host, Canada automatically qualified for the 2015 Women's World Cup and did not participate in either the Championship or Championship qualification. The United States and Mexico received byes directly to the Championship.

== Central America (UNCAF) ==
2014 CONCACAF Women's Championship qualification (Central American zone)
Tournament details
- Host country: Guatemala
- Dates: 20–26 May 2014
- Teams: 7 (from 1 sub-confederation)

Tournament statistics
- Matches played: 10
- Goals scored: 52 (5.2 per match)
- Top scorer(s): (Panama) Amarelis De Mera (6 goals)

All seven member nations participated and were split into a group of 3 and a group of 4. Both group winners qualified for the CONCACAF Women's Championship. The group winners met to determine the sole qualifier to the 2015 Pan American Games women's football tournament. The tournament was hosted in Guatemala (UTC−6).

=== Group 1 ===
Pos	Team	Pld	W	D	L	GF	GA	GD	Pts	Qualification
1	Guatemala (H)	3	3	0	0	9	2	+7	9	CONCACAF Women's Championship; Play-off for Pan American Games
2	Panama	3	2	0	1	17	3	+14	6	
3	Honduras	3	1	0	2	11	7	+4	3	
4	Belize	3	0	0	3	1	26	−25	0	

Source: UNCAF
(H) Hosts
20 May 2014
10:30

Honduras	8–0	Belize
Alarcón 2', 34', 45', 58'; Rodríguez 13'; Amaya 25'; Umanzor 28'; Castellón 36'	Report

Estadio Mateo Flores, Guatemala City
Referee: Vilma Montes (El Salvador)
20 May 2014
13:00

Guatemala	1–0	Panama
M. Monterroso 24'	Report

Estadio Mateo Flores, Guatemala City
Referee: Marianela Araya (Costa Rica)

22 May 2014
10:30

Belize	1–13	Panama
Pollard 17'	Report	Johnson 6'; Gamboa 7' (o.g.); Mills 31'; Cox 38', 55', 71', 82'; Sotillo 59'; De Mera 69', 90', 90+2'; Dow 73'; Vernon 77' (o.g.)

Estadio Mateo Flores, Guatemala City
Referee: Tatiana Guzman (Nicaragua)
22 May 2014
13:00

Guatemala	3–2	Honduras
C. Monterroso 8'; M. Monterroso 45+1'; Barrera 77'	Report	Alarcón 61'; Hall 85'

Estadio Mateo Flores, Guatemala City
Referee: Cibeles Miranda (El Salvador)

24 May 2014
10:30

Panama	4–1	Honduras
Mills 18'; De Mera 22', 66', 72'	Report	Amaya 90+3' (pen.)

Estadio Mateo Flores, Guatemala City
Referee: Marianela Araya (Costa Rica)
24 May 2014
13:00

Guatemala	5–0	Belize
Barrera 10', 32'; Recinos 55'; Ramírez 72' (o.g.); Martínez 77'	Report

Estadio Mateo Flores, Guatemala City
Referee: Vilma Montes (El Salvador)

=== Group 2 ===
Pos	Team	Pld	W	D	L	GF	GA	GD	Pts	Qualification
1	Costa Rica	2	2	0	0	7	0	+7	6	CONCACAF Women's Championship; Play-off for Pan American Games
2	El Salvador	2	1	0	1	2	4	−2	3	
3	Nicaragua	2	0	0	2	0	5	−5	0	

Source: UNCAF
20 May 2014
15:30

Nicaragua	0–2	El Salvador
	Report	González 67'; Quélez 86'

Estadio Mateo Flores, Guatemala City
Referee: Lesbia Garcia (Guatemala)

22 May 2014
15:30

El Salvador	0–4	Costa Rica
	Report	Acosta 15'; R. Rodríguez 43'; Alvarado 50'; L. Rodríguez 51'

Estadio Mateo Flores, Guatemala City
Referee: Melissa Borjas (Honduras)

24 May 2014
15:30

Costa Rica	3–0	Nicaragua
R. Rodríguez 14'; Alvarado 19'; G. Villalobos 72'	Report

Estadio Mateo Flores, Guatemala City
Referee: Francia Gonzalez (Mexico)

=== Play-off for Pan American Games ===
26 May 2014
15:30

Guatemala	0–3	Costa Rica
	Report	Alvarado 13'; R. Rodríguez 35', 90+2'

Estadio Mateo Flores, Guatemala City
Referee: Melissa Borjas (Honduras)

=== Goalscorers ===
6 goals

- (Panama) Amarelis De Mera

5 goals

- (Honduras) Jenny Alarcón

4 goals

- (Costa Rica) Raquel Rodríguez
- (Panama) Marta Cox

3 goals

- (Costa Rica) Katherine Alvarado
- (Guatemala) Diana Barrera

2 goals

- (Guatemala) María Monterroso
- (Honduras) Waleska Diaz
- (Panama) Natalia Mills

1 goal

- (Belize) Kursha Pollard
- (Belize) Shandy Vernon
- (Costa Rica) Gloriana Villalobos
- (Costa Rica) Lixy Rodríguez
- (Costa Rica) Wendy Acosta
- (El Salvador) Damaris Quéles
- (El Salvador) Francisca González
- (Guatemala) Ana Martínez
- (Guatemala) Coralia Monterroso
- (Guatemala) Christian Recinos
- (Honduras) Ali Hall
- (Honduras) Fanny Rodríguez
- (Honduras) Marisela Castellón
- (Honduras) Wendy Umanzor
- (Panama) Candace Johnson
- (Panama) Cindy Sotillo
- (Panama) Emely Dow

1 own goal

- (Belize) Idania Ramírez (playing against Guatemala)
- (Belize) Naomi Gamboa (playing against Panama)

== Caribbean (CFU) ==
Final round of Caribbean Cup
Hosted in Trinidad and Tobago (UTC−4). Matches were played 19–26 August. 8 of the 21 teams in the 2014 CFU Women's Caribbean Cup made it to the final round, Trinidad and Tobago went on to win the finals while Haiti won the 3rd place match. The top two teams of each group qualified for the CONCACAF Women's Championship.

=== Group A ===
Pos	Team	Pld	W	D	L	GF	GA	GD	Pts	Qualification
1	Jamaica	3	3	0	0	15	2	+13	9	CONCACAF Women's Championship and Final
2	Haiti	3	2	0	1	9	3	+6	6	CONCACAF Women's Championship and Match for third place
3	Puerto Rico	3	1	0	2	6	9	−3	3	
4	Bermuda	3	0	0	3	3	19	−16	0	

Source: CFU
19 August 2014
17:00

Jamaica	4–1	Puerto Rico
Henry 6' (pen.); Duncan 34', 51'; Campbell-Green 47'	Report	Suárez 25'

Ato Boldon Stadium, Couva
19 August 2014
19:15

Haiti	5–1	Bermuda
Jean-Pierre 8', 40'; Zullo 38'; Dolce 86'; Charles 89'	Report	Todd 88'

Ato Boldon Stadium, Couva

21 August 2014
17:00

Bermuda	1–9	Jamaica
Todd 70'	Report	Henry 5', 90+2'; Dill 23' (o.g.); Wilson 28'; Duncan 32', 45', 47', 76'; Reid 79'

Ato Boldon Stadium, Couva
21 August 2014
19:15

Puerto Rico	0–4	Haiti
	Report	Gervil 9'; Marseille 45+2'; Brand 75'; Jean-Pierre 79'

Ato Boldon Stadium, Couva

23 August 2014
16:00

Bermuda	1–5	Puerto Rico
Garcia 16' (o.g.)	Report	Socarrás 13', 76'; Fantauzzi 15'; Benson 45'; Aquino 82' (pen.)

Ato Boldon Stadium, Couva
23 August 2014
18:15

Haiti	0–2	Jamaica
	Report	McGregor 8'; Henry 81'

Ato Boldon Stadium, Couva

=== Group B ===
Pos	Team	Pld	W	D	L	GF	GA	GD	Pts	Qualification
1	Trinidad and Tobago (H)	3	3	0	0	20	0	+20	9	CONCACAF Women's Championship and Final
2	Martinique	3	2	0	1	3	7	−4	6	CONCACAF Women's Championship and Match for third place
3	Saint Kitts and Nevis	3	1	0	2	2	12	−10	3	
4	Antigua and Barbuda	3	0	0	3	1	7	−6	0	

Source: CFU
(H) Hosts
20 August 2014
17:00

Antigua and Barbuda	0–2	Martinique
	Report	Carin 12', 64'

Hasely Crawford Stadium, Port of Spain
20 August 2014
19:15

Trinidad and Tobago	10–0	Saint Kitts and Nevis
Cordner 3', 7'; St. Louis 6', 10' (pen.), 22'; Johnson 12'; Shade 44'; François 55', 59'; Mascall 68'	Report

Hasely Crawford Stadium, Port of Spain

22 August 2014
17:00

Saint Kitts and Nevis	0–1	Martinique
	Report	Rouge 52'

Hasely Crawford Stadium, Port of Spain
Referee: Sabina Charles-Kirton (Saint Lucia)
22 August 2014
19:15

Trinidad and Tobago	3–0	Antigua and Barbuda
Shade 35', 53'; St. Louis 64'	Report

Hasely Crawford Stadium, Port of Spain

24 August 2014
16:00

Antigua and Barbuda	1–2	Saint Kitts and Nevis
Humphreys 5'	Report	Powell 70'; Browne 90'

Hasely Crawford Stadium, Port of Spain
24 August 2014
18:15

Trinidad and Tobago	7–0	Martinique
Cordner 1'; St. Louis 4', 9', 45'; Shade 48', 62'; Mascall 69'	Report

Hasely Crawford Stadium, Port of Spain

== Qualified teams ==
North American zone

- Mexico (automatic)
- United States (automatic; hosts)

Central American zone

- Guatemala
- Costa Rica

Caribbean zone

- Trinidad and Tobago
- Jamaica
- Haiti
- Martinique
