= 2014 CFU Women's Caribbean Cup =

- The official logo of the Women's Caribbean Cup

Tournament details
- Host countries: Antigua and Barbuda; Puerto Rico; Turks and Caicos Islands; Haiti; Dominican Republic (first round groups); Trinidad and Tobago (finals)
- Dates: 23 May – 22 June (first round); 19–26 August 2014 (finals)
- Teams: 21 (total); 8 (finals) (from 1 sub-confederation)

Final positions
- Champions: Trinidad and Tobago
- Runners-up: Jamaica
- Third place: Haiti
- Fourth place: Martinique

Tournament statistics
- Matches played: 35
- Goals scored: 161 (4.6 per match)
- Top scorer(s): (Jamaica) Shakira Duncan (total; 14 goals) (Trinidad and Tobago) Tasha St. Louis (finals; 7 goals)

2014 Women's Caribbean Cup. Twenty nations entered the First Round in 5 groups, but three withdrew before playing any match. The group winners and 2 best runners-up teams joined Trinidad and Tobago in the Second Round, split into 2 groups of 4. The Second Round group winners and runners-up qualified for the Championship. The Second Round group winners met for the Women's Caribbean Cup; the Second Round runners-up met for third place. Though announced as the inaugural edition, the Women's Caribbean Cup had been held once before in 2000. The tournament also served as a qualifier for the 2014 CONCACAF Women's Championship

== First round ==
=== Group 1 ===
Hosted in Antigua and Barbuda (UTC−4). Matches were played 23–27 May.

Pos	Team	Pld	W	D	L	GF	GA	GD	Pts	Qualification
1	Antigua and Barbuda (H)	3	3	0	0	3	0	+3	9	Final round
2	Saint Vincent and the Grenadines	3	1	1	1	2	1	+1	4	
3	U.S. Virgin Islands	3	1	1	1	1	1	0	4	
4	Aruba	3	0	0	3	0	4	−4	0	

Source: CFU
(H) Hosts
23 May 2014
17:00

Aruba	0–2	Saint Vincent and the Grenadines
	Report	Franklyn 10', 38'

Antigua Recreation Ground, St. John's
23 May 2014
19:00

Antigua and Barbuda	1–0	U.S. Virgin Islands
Hughes 49'	Report

Antigua Recreation Ground, St. John's

25 May 2014
17:00

Saint Vincent and the Grenadines	0–0	U.S. Virgin Islands
	Report

Antigua Recreation Ground, St. John's
25 May 2014
19:00

Antigua and Barbuda	1–0	Aruba
Green 21'	Report

Antigua Recreation Ground, St. John's

27 May 2014
17:00

U.S. Virgin Islands	1–0	Aruba
Adams 7'	Report

Antigua Recreation Ground, St. John's
27 May 2014
19:00

Antigua and Barbuda	1–0	Saint Vincent and the Grenadines
Buckley 38'	Report

Antigua Recreation Ground, St. John's

=== Group 2 ===
Hosted in Puerto Rico (UTC−4). Matches were played 23–27 May.

Pos	Team	Pld	W	D	L	GF	GA	GD	Pts	Qualification
1	Martinique	2	1	1	0	4	2	+2	4	Final round
2	Puerto Rico (H)	2	1	1	0	2	1	+1	4	Final round
3	Barbados	2	0	0	2	1	4	−3	0	
4	Dominica	0	0	0	0	0	0	0	0	Withdrew (Note: Dominica withdrew before the tournament due to some members not receiving visas.)

Source: CFU
(H) Hosts
Notes:
23 May 2014
19:00

Martinique	3–1	Barbados
? 3' ? 44' ? 47'	Report	? 7'

Juan Ramón Loubriel Stadium, Bayamón

25 May 2014
17:00

Puerto Rico	1–0	Barbados
Socarrás 69'	Report

Juan Ramón Loubriel Stadium, Bayamón

27 May 2014
19:00

Puerto Rico	1–1	Martinique
Guerra 9'	Report	Carin 36'

Juan Ramón Loubriel Stadium, Bayamón

=== Group 3 ===
Hosted in Turks and Caicos Islands (UTC−4). Matches were played 23–27 May. Bermuda was added to the group after the group stage draw.

Pos	Team	Pld	W	D	L	GF	GA	GD	Pts	Qualification
1	Bermuda	3	2	1	0	10	3	+7	7	Final round
2	Saint Kitts and Nevis	3	2	0	1	10	3	+7	6	Final round
3	Cayman Islands	3	1	1	1	5	7	−2	4	
4	Turks and Caicos Islands (H)	3	0	0	3	0	12	−12	0	

Source: CFU
(H) Hosts
23 May 2014
17:00

Cayman Islands	0–5	Saint Kitts and Nevis
	Report	Browne 12', 26', 90'; Powell 39'; Harris 81'

TCIFA National Academy, Providenciales
23 May 2014
19:30

Turks and Caicos Islands	0–5	Bermuda
	Report	Todd 14', 17'; Bell 27', 64'; Nolan 54'

TCIFA National Academy, Providenciales

25 May 2014
17:00

Bermuda	2–2	Cayman Islands
Todd 32'; Bell 55'	Report	Gall 74'; Ebanks 88'

TCIFA National Academy, Providenciales
25 May 2014
19:30

Turks and Caicos Islands	0–4	Saint Kitts and Nevis
	Report	Browne 5', 24'; Springer 48'; Francis 62'

TCIFA National Academy, Providenciales

27 May 2014
17:00

Saint Kitts and Nevis	1–3	Bermuda
Browne 31'	Report	Furbert 14'; Todd 17' (pen.); Richardson 70'

TCIFA National Academy, Providenciales
27 May 2014
19:30

Turks and Caicos Islands	0–3	Cayman Islands
	Report	Gall 45', 68'; Frederick 89'

TCIFA National Academy, Providenciales

=== Group 4 ===
Hosted in Haiti (UTC−4). Matches were played 30 May – 3 June.

Pos	Team	Pld	W	D	L	GF	GA	GD	Pts	Qualification
1	Haiti (H)	2	2	0	0	4	0	+4	6	Final round
2	Cuba	2	1	0	1	2	1	+1	3	
3	Suriname	2	0	0	2	0	5	−5	0	
4	Guadeloupe	0	0	0	0	0	0	0	0	Withdrew (Note: Guadeloupe withdrew before the tournament due to outbreak of chikungunya virus.)

Source: CFU
(H) Hosts
Notes:
30 May 2014
18:00

Cuba	2–0	Suriname
Peláez 62' (pen.); Calderón 83'	Report

Parc Bayas, Mirebalais

1 June 2014
18:00

Haiti	3–0	Suriname
Brand 34'; Dolce 75' (pen.); Louis 83'	Report

Parc Bayas, Mirebalais

3 June 2014
18:00

Haiti	1–0	Cuba
Baró 85' (o.g.)	Report

Parc Bayas, Mirebalais

=== Group 5 ===
Hosted in Dominican Republic (UTC−4). Matches were played 18–22 June.

Pos	Team	Pld	W	D	L	GF	GA	GD	Pts	Qualification
1	Jamaica	2	2	0	0	21	0	+21	6	Final round
2	Dominican Republic (H)	2	1	0	1	7	7	0	3	
3	Saint Lucia	2	0	0	2	0	21	−21	0	
4	Anguilla	0	0	0	0	0	0	0	0	Withdrew (Note: Anguilla withdrew before the tournament due to outbreak of chikungunya virus.)

Source: CFU
(H) Hosts
Notes:
18 June 2014
16:00

Dominican Republic	7–0	Saint Lucia
Ubri 24', 62'; Núñez 26', 54', 84', 90+2'; Peña 47'	Report

Estadio Panamericano, San Cristóbal

20 June 2014
16:00

Saint Lucia	0–14	Jamaica
	Report	Davis 2'; Campbell 28'; Duncan 37', 55', 56', 61'; Henry 45+2'; Marquis 45+6' (o.g.); Allen 67', 74', 86'; Reid 79'; Loughran 88'; Forrester 90'

Estadio Panamericano, San Cristóbal

22 June 2014
16:00

Dominican Republic	0–7	Jamaica
	Report	Duncan 3', 23', 64', 77'; Davis 31', 90+1'; Henry 42'

Estadio Panamericano, San Cristóbal

=== Ranking of second placed teams ===
The two runners-up with the best records against the 1st and 3rd placed teams in their respective groups also qualified for the final round.

Pos	Team	Pld	W	D	L	GF	GA	GD	Pts	Qualification
1	Puerto Rico	2	1	1	0	2	1	+1	4	Final round
2	Saint Kitts and Nevis	2	1	0	1	6	3	+3	3	Final round
3	Cuba	2	1	0	1	2	1	+1	3	
4	Dominican Republic	2	1	0	1	7	7	0	3	
5	Saint Vincent and the Grenadines	2	0	1	1	0	1	−1	1	

Source: CFU

== Final round ==
Hosted in Trinidad and Tobago (UTC−4). Matches were played 19–26 August. The top two teams of each group qualified for the CONCACAF Women's Championship.

=== Group A ===
Pos	Team	Pld	W	D	L	GF	GA	GD	Pts	Qualification
1	Jamaica	3	3	0	0	15	2	+13	9	CONCACAF Women's Championship and Final
2	Haiti	3	2	0	1	9	3	+6	6	CONCACAF Women's Championship and Match for third place
3	Puerto Rico	3	1	0	2	6	9	−3	3	
4	Bermuda	3	0	0	3	3	19	−16	0	

Source: CFU
19 August 2014
17:00

Jamaica	4–1	Puerto Rico
Henry 6' (pen.); Duncan 34', 51'; Campbell-Green 47'	Report	Suárez 25'

Ato Boldon Stadium, Couva
19 August 2014
19:15

Haiti	5–1	Bermuda
Jean-Pierre 8', 40'; Zullo 38'; Dolce 86'; Charles 89'	Report	Todd 88'

Ato Boldon Stadium, Couva

21 August 2014
17:00

Bermuda	1–9	Jamaica
Todd 70'	Report	Henry 5', 90+2'; Dill 23' (o.g.); Wilson 28'; Duncan 32', 45', 47', 76'; Reid 79'

Ato Boldon Stadium, Couva
21 August 2014
19:15

Puerto Rico	0–4	Haiti
	Report	Gervil 9'; Marseille 45+2'; Brand 75'; Jean-Pierre 79'

Ato Boldon Stadium, Couva

23 August 2014
16:00

Bermuda	1–5	Puerto Rico
Garcia 16' (o.g.)	Report	Socarrás 13', 76'; Fantauzzi 15'; Benson 45'; Aquino 82' (pen.)

Ato Boldon Stadium, Couva
23 August 2014
18:15

Haiti	0–2	Jamaica
	Report	McGregor 8'; Henry 81'

Ato Boldon Stadium, Couva

=== Group B ===
Pos	Team	Pld	W	D	L	GF	GA	GD	Pts	Qualification
1	Trinidad and Tobago (H)	3	3	0	0	20	0	+20	9	CONCACAF Women's Championship and Final
2	Martinique	3	2	0	1	3	7	−4	6	CONCACAF Women's Championship and Match for third place
3	Saint Kitts and Nevis	3	1	0	2	2	12	−10	3	
4	Antigua and Barbuda	3	0	0	3	1	7	−6	0	

Source: CFU
(H) Hosts
20 August 2014
17:00

Antigua and Barbuda	0–2	Martinique
	Report	Carin 12', 64'

Hasely Crawford Stadium, Port of Spain
20 August 2014
19:15

Trinidad and Tobago	10–0	Saint Kitts and Nevis
Cordner 3', 7'; St. Louis 6', 10' (pen.), 22'; Johnson 12'; Shade 44'; François 55', 59'; Mascall 68'	Report

Hasely Crawford Stadium, Port of Spain

22 August 2014
17:00

Saint Kitts and Nevis	0–1	Martinique
	Report	Rouge 52'

Hasely Crawford Stadium, Port of Spain
Referee: Sabina Charles-Kirton (Saint Lucia)
22 August 2014
19:15

Trinidad and Tobago	3–0	Antigua and Barbuda
Shade 35', 53'; St. Louis 64'	Report

Hasely Crawford Stadium, Port of Spain

24 August 2014
16:00

Antigua and Barbuda	1–2	Saint Kitts and Nevis
Humphreys 5'	Report	Powell 70'; Browne 90'

Hasely Crawford Stadium, Port of Spain
24 August 2014
18:15

Trinidad and Tobago	7–0	Martinique
Cordner 1'; St. Louis 4', 9', 45'; Shade 48', 62'; Mascall 69'	Report

Hasely Crawford Stadium, Port of Spain

=== Match for third place ===
26 August 2014
17:00

Haiti	5–1	Martinique
Bobo 15', 47', 72'; Wisline Dolce 45'; Pierre-Louis 70'	Report	Brena 64'

Hasely Crawford Stadium, Port of Spain

=== Final ===
26 August 2014
19:15

Jamaica	0–1	Trinidad and Tobago
	Report	Shade 8'

Hasely Crawford Stadium, Port of Spain

== Goalscorers ==
Includes both first round and final round.

14 goals

- (Jamaica) Shakira Duncan

7 goals

- (Trinidad and Tobago) Tasha St. Louis
- (Saint Kitts and Nevis) Phoenetia Browne

6 goals

- (Bermuda) Shauntae Todd
- (Jamaica) Donna-Kay Henry
- (Trinidad and Tobago) Mariah Shade

4 goals

- (Dominican Republic) Yaqueisi Núñez

3 goals

- (Bermuda) Cheyra Bell
- (Cayman Islands) Shenel Gall
- (Haiti) Kensie Bobo
- (Haiti) Wisline Dolce
- (Haiti) Marie Yves Dina Jean Pierre
- (Jamaica) Alexa Allen
- (Jamaica) Omolyn Davis
- (Martinique) Prisca Carin
- (Puerto Rico) Karina Socarrás
- (Trinidad and Tobago) Kennya Cordner

2 goals

- (Dominican Republic) Betzaida Ubrí
- (Haiti) Samantha Brand
- (Haiti) Manoucheka Pierre Louis
- (Saint Kitts and Nevis) Kerisha Powell
- (Trinidad and Tobago) Janine François
- (Trinidad and Tobago) Dernelle Mascall
- (Saint Vincent and the Grenadines) Kendice Franklyn

1 goal

- (Antigua and Barbuda) Amelia Green
- (Antigua and Barbuda) Kanika Buckley
- (Antigua and Barbuda) Kitanya Hughes
- (Antigua and Barbuda) Breanna Humphreys
- (Bermuda) Aaliyah Nolan
- (Bermuda) Akeyla Furbert
- (Bermuda) Dominique Richardson
- (Cayman Islands) Courtisha Ebanks
- (Cayman Islands) Shanelle Frederick
- (Cuba) Rachel Peláez
- (Cuba) Yoanna Calderón
- (Dominican Republic) Gabriela Peña
- (Haiti) Generve Charles
- (Haiti) Yvrase Gervil
- (Haiti) Kencia Marseille
- (Haiti) Dayanai Baro Mesa
- (Haiti) Lindsay Zullo
- (Jamaica) Sashana Campbell
- (Jamaica) Kenesha Reid
- (Jamaica) Amy Loughran
- (Jamaica) Sherona Forrester
- (Jamaica) Nicole Campbell-Green
- (Jamaica) Jodi-Ann McGregor
- (Jamaica) Venicia Reid
- (Jamaica) Alicia Wilson
- (Martinique) Kelly Brena
- (Martinique) Aurélie Rouge
- (Puerto Rico) María Aquino
- (Puerto Rico) Zahimara Fantauzzi
- (Puerto Rico) Jackie Guerra
- (Puerto Rico) Laura Suárez
- (Saint Kitts and Nevis) Chelsey Harris
- (Saint Kitts and Nevis) Caroline Springer
- (Saint Kitts and Nevis) Lavern Francis
- (Trinidad and Tobago) Maylee Atthin-Johnson
- (United States Virgin Islands) Jessica Adams

1 own goal

- (Bermuda) Keunna Dill (playing against Jamaica)
- (Saint Lucia) Ellaisa Marquis (playing against Jamaica)
- (Puerto Rico) Miosoty García (playing against Bermuda)

Unknown scorers

- Martinique : 3 additional goals
- Barbados : 1 additional goal

== See also ==
- CFU Women's Caribbean Cup
  - 2000 CFU Women's Caribbean Cup
