= Saint Lucia women's national football team results =

The Saint Lucia women's national football team is the representative women's association football team of Saint Lucia. Its governing body is the Saint Lucia Football Association (SLFA) and it competes as a member of the Confederation of North, Central America and Caribbean Association Football (CONCACAF).

The national team's first activity was in early 2000s, when they competed at the inaugural Caribbean Football Union Women's Championship. the Saint Lucian showed high and good performance in their Debut match against British Virgin Islands in which they won by a score of 8 to nil. their second match, on the other hand, gave them their biggest win by a score of 13 to nil. Saint Lucia is currently ranked 150th in the FIFA Women's World Rankings.

== Record per opponent ==
Key

Positive balance (more wins than losses)
Neutral balance (as many wins as losses)
Negative balance (more losses than wins)

The following table shows Saint Lucia's all-time official international record per opponent:

Opponent	Pld	W	D	L	GF	GA	GD	W%	Confederation
Antigua and Barbuda	3	2	1	0	4	3	+1	66.67	CONCACAF
Bahamas	1	1	0	0	7	1	+6	100.00	CONCACAF
Barbados	3	0	0	3	6	9	-3	00.00	CONCACAF
British Virgin Islands	2	2	0	0	21	0	+21	100.00	CONCACAF
Cuba	1	0	0	3	3	12	-9	00.00	CONCACAF
Curaçao	1	1	0	0	2	1	+1	100.00	CONCACAF
Dominica	3	1	1	1	3	7	-4	33.33	CONCACAF
Dominican Republic	2	0	1	1	2	9	-7	00.00	CONCACAF
Grenada	3	0	2	1	3	5	-2	00.00	CONCACAF
Guadeloupe	2	2	0	0	10	2	+8	100.00	CONCACAF
Guyana	1	0	0	1	0	8	-8	00.00	CONCACAF
Haiti	2	0	0	2	1	5	-4	00.00	CONCACAF
Jamaica	3	0	0	3	0	30	-30	00.00	CONCACAF
Saint Kitts and Nevis	2	2	0	0	4	2	+2	100.00	CONCACAF
Saint Vincent and the Grenadines	6	4	2	0	15	8	+7	66.67	CONCACAF
Suriname	1	0	1	0	1	1	0	00.00	CONCACAF
Trinidad and Tobago	3	0	0	3	2	20	-18	00.00	CONCACAF
U.S. Virgin Islands	2	2	0	0	11	1	+10	100.00	CONCACAF
Total	43	17	8	18	95	124	-29	48.84	—

== Results ==
=== 2000 ===
21 May 2000 2000 CFU Caribbean Cup Preliminary round	Saint Lucia	8–0	British Virgin Islands	Saint Lucia
--:-- UTC−4

28 May 2000 2000 CFU Caribbean Cup Preliminary round	British Virgin Islands	0–13	Saint Lucia	British Virgin Islands
--:-- UTC−4

14 November 2000 2000 CFU Caribbean Cup Final round	Saint Lucia	6–2	Saint Vincent and the Grenadines	Castries, Saint Lucia
--:-- UTC−4

16 November 2000 2000 CFU Caribbean Cup Final round	Saint Lucia	1–1	Suriname	Castries, Saint Lucia
--:-- UTC−4

16 November 2000 2000 CFU Caribbean Cup Final round	Saint Lucia	1–3	Haiti	Castries, Saint Lucia
--:-- UTC−4

=== 2002 ===
10 July 2002 2002 CONCACAF Women's Gold Cup qualification Group 2	Dominican Republic	2–2	Saint Lucia	Haiti
--:-- UTC−4

12 July 2002 2002 CONCACAF Women's Gold Cup qualification Group 2	Saint Lucia	0–2	Haiti	Haiti
--:-- UTC−4

14 July 2002 2002 CONCACAF Women's Gold Cup qualification Group 2	Saint Lucia	7–1	Bahamas	Haiti
--:-- UTC−4

=== 2006 ===
8 May 2006 2006 CONCACAF Women's Gold Cup qualification Caribbean Zone	Jamaica	5–0	Saint Lucia	Jamaica
--:-- UTC−5			V. Reid 4'; Davis 45'; Parker 64'; Duncan 70'; N. Reid 89'

10 May 2006 2006 CONCACAF Women's Gold Cup qualification Caribbean Zone	Saint Lucia	3–2	Saint Kitts and Nevis	Jamaica
--:-- UTC−5

12 May 2006 2006 CONCACAF Women's Gold Cup qualification Caribbean Zone	Antigua and Barbuda	1–2	Saint Lucia	Jamaica
--:-- UTC−5

=== 2010 ===
10 March 2010 2010 CONCACAF World Cup Qualifying qualification Caribbean Zone First round Group C	Antigua and Barbuda	1–2	Saint Lucia	St. John's, Antigua and Barbuda
16:15 UTC−4	London 2'	Report	Marquis 40'; Jean 44'	Stadium: Antigua Recreation Ground; Attendance: 200; Referee: Nicole Joseph (Guyana)

12 March 2010 2010 CONCACAF World Cup Qualifying qualification Caribbean Zone First round Group C	U.S. Virgin Islands	0–7	Saint Lucia	St. John's, Antigua and Barbuda
16:15 UTC−4		Report	Alphonse 8'; Jean 27', 33', 60'; Frederick 47', 61'; Celestin 85'	Stadium: Antigua Recreation Ground; Attendance: 50; Referee: Bryan Willett (Antigua and Barbuda)

10 May 2010 2010 CONCACAF World Cup Qualifying qualification Caribbean Zone Second round Group F	Trinidad and Tobago	6–1	Saint Lucia	Macoya, Trinidad and Tobago
19:00 UTC−4	Edwards 11', 23'; Cordner 19', 52'; Mollon 56'; Shade 87'	Report	Alphonse 60'	Stadium: Marvin Lee Stadium; Attendance: 150; Referee: Cardella Samuels (Jamaica)

12 May 2010 2010 CONCACAF World Cup Qualifying qualification Caribbean Zone Second round Group F	Saint Lucia	0–8	Guyana	Macoya, Trinidad and Tobago
17:00 UTC−4		Report	El-Masri 9'; A. Rodrigues 11', 54'; Heydorn 15', 58', 64'; Owen 47'; J. Rodrigues 63'	Stadium: Marvin Lee Stadium; Attendance: 200; Referee: Shane De Silva (Trinidad and Tobago)

14 May 2010 2010 CONCACAF World Cup Qualifying qualification Caribbean Zone Second round Group F	Barbados	4–3	Saint Lucia	Macoya, Trinidad and Tobago
16:00 UTC−4	Stevenson 19'; Brathwaite 35', 50', 55'	Report	Henry 71', 86'; Marquis 78'	Stadium: Marvin Lee Stadium; Attendance: 300; Referee: Shane De Silva (Trinidad and Tobago)

=== 2014 ===
18 June 2014 2014 CFU Caribbean Cup First round Group 5	Dominican Republic	7–0	Saint Lucia	San Cristóbal, Dominican Republic
16:00 UTC−4	Ubri 24', 62'; Núñez 26', 54', 84', 90+2'; Peña 47'	Report		Stadium: Estadio Panamericano

20 June 2014 2014 CFU Caribbean Cup First round Group 5	Saint Lucia	0–14	Jamaica	San Cristóbal, Dominican Republic
16:00 UTC−4		Report	Davis 2'; Campbell 28'; Duncan 37', 55', 56', 61'; Henry 45+2'; Marquis 45+6' (o.g.); Allen 67', 74', 86'; Reid 79'; Loughran 88'; Forrester 90'	Stadium: Estadio Panamericano

=== 2015 ===
11 April 2015 2015 Windward Islands Tournament	Dominica	5–0	Saint Lucia	Kingstown, St. Vincent and The Grenadines
--:-- UTC−4

9 April 2015 2015 Windward Islands Tournament	Saint Vincent and the Grenadines	2–2	Saint Lucia	Kingstown, St. Vincent and The Grenadines
--:-- UTC−4

7 April 2015 2015 Windward Islands Tournament	Grenada	2–2	Saint Lucia	Kingstown, St. Vincent and The Grenadines
--:-- UTC−4

13 November 2015 2016 CONCACAF Olympic Qualifying Championship qualification Group 2	Trinidad and Tobago	6–0	Saint Lucia	Couva, Trinidad and Tobago
18:00 UTC−4	Mollon 3', 66'; St. Louis 10', 33', 38', 58'			Stadium: Ato Boldon Stadium

15 November 2015 2016 CONCACAF Olympic Qualifying Championship qualification Group 2	Saint Lucia	1–8	Trinidad and Tobago	Couva, Trinidad and Tobago
18:00 UTC−4	Marquis 58' (pen.)	Report	Mollon 12', 32', 81', 83'; Hutchinson 23', 26'; Guerra 65'; Cummings 87'	Stadium: Ato Boldon Stadium

=== 2017 ===
22 November 2017 2017 Windward Islands Tournament	Barbados	2–1	Saint Lucia	Kingstown, St. Vincent and The Grenadines
17:20 UTC−4	Jarvis ?', ?'		Edward ?'

24 November 2017 2017 Windward Islands Tournament	Grenada	1–1	Saint Lucia	Kingstown, St. Vincent and The Grenadines
17:00 UTC−4	Charles ?'		Marquis ?'

26 November 2017 2017 Windward Islands Tournament	Saint Vincent and the Grenadines	3–3	Saint Lucia	Kingstown, St. Vincent and The Grenadines
18:00 UTC−4	Kandice 18', 58'; Carrington 53'		Marquis 30', 40'; Gerald 24'

=== 2018 ===
18 April 2018 2018 CFU Challenge Series Group A	Saint Vincent and the Grenadines	0–1	Saint Lucia	Basseterre, St. Kitts and Nevis
17:00 UTC−4		Report	Marquis 49'	Stadium: Warner Park Sporting Complex

20 April 2018 2018 CFU Challenge Series Group A	Saint Lucia	0–0	Dominica	Basseterre, St. Kitts and Nevis
17:00 UTC−4		Report		Stadium: Warner Park Sporting Complex

22 April 2018 2018 CFU Challenge Series Group A	Saint Kitts and Nevis	0–1	Saint Lucia	Basseterre, St. Kitts and Nevis
19:30 UTC−4		Report	Prospere 22'	Stadium: Warner Park Sporting Complex

23 May 2018 2018 CONCACAF Championship qualification Group D	Saint Lucia	2–1	Curaçao	St. John's, Antigua and Barbuda
16:00 UTC−4	Marquis 30'; Lionel 58'	Report	Statia 55'	Stadium: Antigua Recreation Ground

25 May 2018 2018 CONCACAF Championship qualification Group D	Saint Vincent and the Grenadines	1–2	Saint Lucia	St. John's, Antigua and Barbuda
16:00 UTC−4	Duncan 74'	Report	Willie 5'; Cox 88'	Stadium: Antigua Recreation Ground

27 May 2018 2018 CONCACAF Championship qualification Group D	Saint Lucia	0–1	Antigua and Barbuda	St. John's, Antigua and Barbuda
18:30 UTC−4		Report	Edwards 2'	Stadium: Antigua Recreation Ground

=== 2019 ===
2 July 2019 2019 Windward Islands Tournament	Saint Lucia	3–2	Dominica	Gros Islet, Saint Lucia
--:-- UTC−4	Lionel 18'; Lashley 39'; Marquis 59'	Report	Phillip 2'; Bertrand 49'	Stadium: Daren Sammy Cricket Ground

4 July 2019 2019 Windward Islands Tournament	Saint Lucia	1–0	Saint Vincent and the Grenadines	Gros Islet, Saint Lucia
--:-- UTC−4	Marquis 47'	Report		Stadium: Daren Sammy Cricket Ground

6 July 2019 2019 Windward Islands Tournament	Saint Lucia	0–2	Grenada	Gros Islet, Saint Lucia
--:-- UTC−4		Report	Noel 5'; Johnson 25'	Stadium: Daren Sammy Cricket Ground

30 September 2019 2020 CONCACAF Olympic Qualifying Championship qualification Group B	Barbados	3–2	Saint Lucia	Kingston, Jamaica
16:00 UTC−5	Briggs-Thompson 16'; Stevenson 17', 20'	Report	St. Louis 37'; Shepherd 70'	Stadium: National Stadium.

2 October 2019 2020 CONCACAF Olympic Qualifying Championship qualification Group B	Saint Lucia	4–1	U.S. Virgin Islands	Kingston, Jamaica
16:00 UTC−5	Shepherd 13', 18'; St. Louis 40'; Lashley 66'	Report	Montano 35'	Stadium: National Stadium.

6 October 2019 2020 CONCACAF Olympic Qualifying Championship qualification Group B	Saint Lucia	0–11	Jamaica	Kingston, Jamaica
18:30 UTC−5		Report	Shaw 4', 17', 35'; Matthews 6'; Blackwood 25', 69', 79'; Bond-Flasza 32'; Cameron 38'; Carter 56'; Clarke 90'	Stadium: National Stadium. Referee: Quetzalli Alvarado (Mexico)

8 October 2019 2020 CONCACAF Olympic Qualifying Championship qualification Group B	Cuba	6–1	Saint Lucia	Kingston, Jamaica
16:00 UTC−5	Chirino 13'; M. Pérez 42' (pen.), 48' (pen.); Calderón 50'; Rodríguez 69' (pen.), 73'	Report	St. Louis 61'	Stadium: National Stadium.

=== 2023 ===
22 September 2023 Concacaf W Gold Cup Qualification League C	Saint Lucia	1–2	Cuba	Gros Islet, Saint Lucia
	Joseph 15'	Report	Rodriguez 4'; Mengana 90+3'	Stadium: Daren Sammy Cricket Ground; Referee: Shandor Wilkinson (St. Kitts and Nevis)

26 September 2023 Concacaf W Gold Cup Qualification League C	Guadeloupe	1–5	Saint Lucia	Sainte-Anne, Guadeloupe
	Lepante 37'	Report	Louis 2', 45+2', 47', 80'; Marquis 87'	Stadium: Stade municipal de Sainte-Anne; Referee: Saphire Stockman (Costa Rica)

1 December 2023 Concacaf W Gold Cup Qualification League C	Saint Lucia	5–1	Guadeloupe	Gros Islet, Saint Lucia
	Louis 7', 21'; St. Louis 39', 57', 90+2'	Report	Garriba 89'	Stadium: Daren Sammy Cricket Ground; Referee: Cecile Hinds (Trinidad and Tobago)

5 December 2023 Concacaf W Gold Cup Qualification League C	Cuba	4–1	Saint Lucia	Santiago de Cuba, Cuba
	Núñez 9', 14'; Espinosa 38'; Aguilar 73' (pen.)	Report	John 63'	Stadium: Estadio Antonio Maceo; Referee: Deily Gómez (Costa Rica)

== See also ==
- Saint Lucia national football team results
