= Darton State College Division of Nursing =

Coordinates: 31°35′2″N 84°12′43″W

- Type: State college
- Active: 1963–2016
- Parent institution: Darton College
- Location: Albany, Georgia, United States
- Chair: Deanna Radford, MSN, RN, CNE
- Website: Darton State College Division of Nursing (WayBack Machine web archive)

Darton State College Division of Nursing was the nursing program at Darton State College in Albany, Georgia. The final Darton class was graduated in December 2016 and in January 2017, Darton State College and Albany State University officially merged, retaining the Albany State University name. The Darton State College campus became Albany State University West Campus and the location of Darton College of Health Professions, one of the four academic colleges and units at the university as of July 2019.

== Degrees ==
The Division of Nursing offered Associate of Science in Nursing (ASN) and Bachelor of Science in Nursing (BSN) degrees.

== Programs ==
There were satellite ASN programs in Cordele, Sandersville, Swainsboro and Thomasville in addition to evening and hybrid online tracks as well as professional healthcare bridge programs for paramedics and LPNs in Albany, and Sandersville as well as combat medics at Fort Benning.

== History ==
Darton College received a $2.48 million grant from the U.S. Department of Labor in 2005 to develop an online nursing program.

In 2010, 70 percent of the nurses in local hospitals and physician offices were Darton graduates; more than 30 percent of the nurses in the surrounding 38-county area were Darton graduates.

In 2012, 343 students earned Associate of Science in Nursing degrees from Darton, the most ever in one year. In 2013, “for the third consecutive year Darton’s Nursing Division graduated more registered nurses than any other college or university in the state of Georgia.”

The Darton Nursing Division graduated its first seventeen Bachelor of Science in Nursing students in July, 2013.

== Accreditation ==
The Associate and Baccalaureate Degree programs were approved by the Georgia Board of Nursing and accredited by the NLNAC's Accrediting Commission for Education in Nursing, Inc.

== Facilities ==
The 25,800 square-foot Nursing Building on the Darton State College campus in Albany was completed in 2010 at a cost of $5.1 million including furnishings. It included a 150-seat auditorium, lecture halls with 50 and 70 seats, 21 faculty offices, a simulation lab, a nursing lab, a conference room, and a student lounge.

== Organizations ==
The Darton Association of Nursing Students was the local chapter of the Georgia Association of Nursing Students which is in turn part of the National Student Nurses' Association.
