= Sashana Campbell =

Jamaican footballer (born 1991)

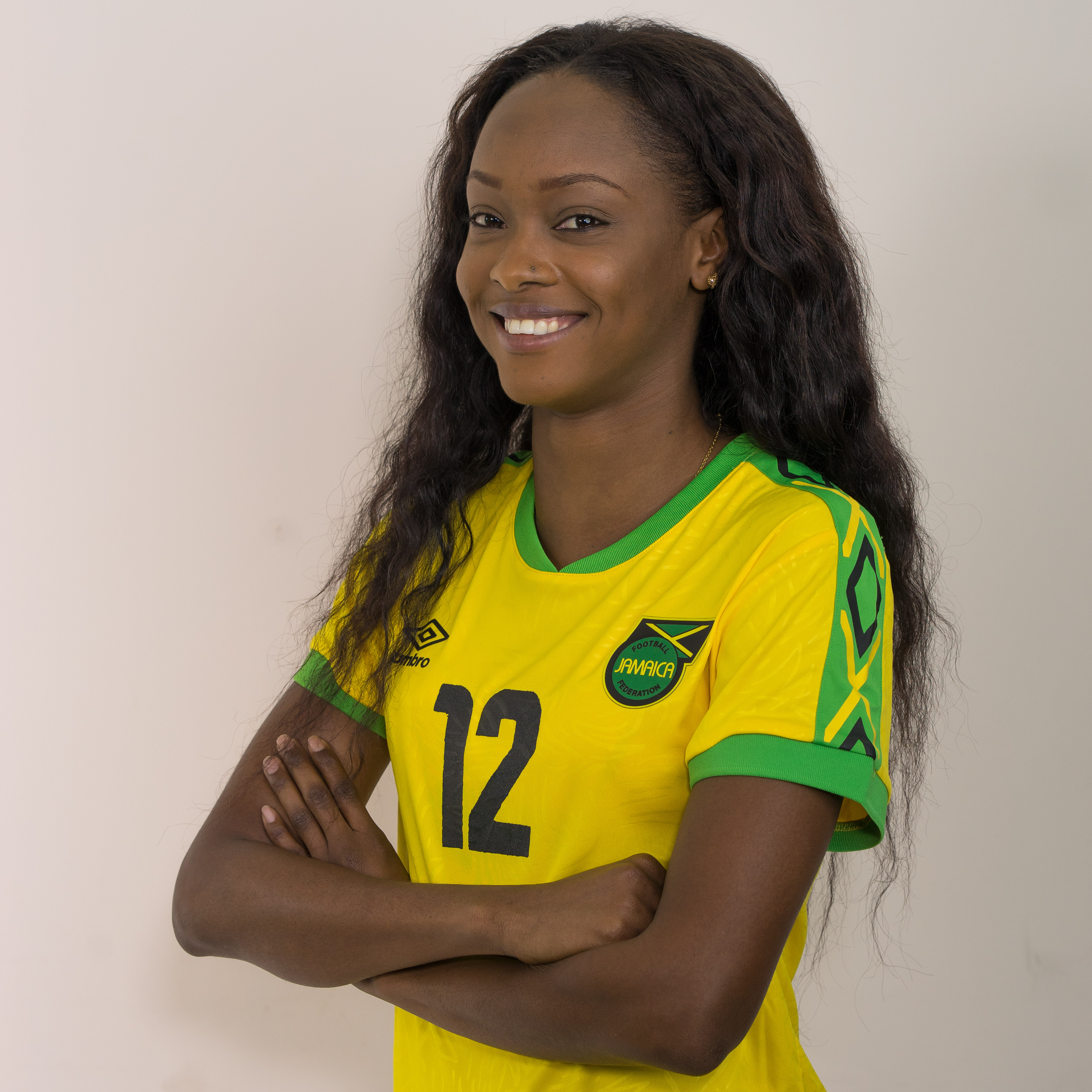

Personal information
- Full name: Sashana Carolyn Campbell
- Date of birth: 2 March 1991 (age 35)
- Place of birth: Spanish Town, Jamaica
- Height: 1.60 m (5 ft 3 in)
- Position: Defender

Team information
- Current team: Frazsiers Whip
- Number: 17

College career
Years	Team	Apps	(Gls)
2010–2011	Darton State Cavaliers		
2012–2013	West Florida Argonauts		

Senior career*
Years	Team	Apps	(Gls)
- Reno
- Christiana Strikers
- Los Perfectos
2015–2016	Grindavík	34	(17)
2016	Los Perfectos		
2017–2020	Maccabi Kishronot Hadera	40	(6)
2022–2024	Medyk Konin	28	(1)
2024–	Frazsiers Whip		

International career^{‡}
2009–2010	Jamaica U20	8	(3)
2014–	Jamaica	34	(3)
Medal record
Representing Jamaica
CONCACAF W Championship
Third place	2018 United States
- * Club domestic league appearances and goals as of November 27, 2024 ‡ National team caps and goals as of 8 June 2019

Sashana Carolyn Campbell (born 2 March 1991) is a Jamaican footballer who plays as a defender for Frazsiers Whip and the Jamaica women's national team.

== Career ==
Campbell attended Darton College and the University of West Florida before embarking on a professional career.

In April 2022, Campbell joined Polish club Medyk Konin. She is part of the Football is Freedom organization led by Cedella Marley.

== International goals ==
Scores and results list Jamaica's goal tally first.

No.	Date	Venue	Opponent	Score	Result	Competition
1	20 June 2014	Estadio Panamericano, San Cristóbal, Dominican Republic	Saint Lucia	2–0	14–0	2014 CFU Women's Caribbean Cup
2	11 October 2018	H-E-B Park, Edinburg, United States	Cuba	3–0	9–0	2018 CONCACAF Women's Championship
3	11 October 2018	H-E-B Park, Edinburg, United States	Cuba	8–0	9–0	2018 CONCACAF Women's Championship
