= Shakira Duncan =

Jamaican footballer (born 1989)

Personal information
- Full name: Shakira Duncan
- Date of birth: October 1, 1989 (age 37)
- Place of birth: Spanish Town, Jamaica
- Height: 1.65 m (5 ft 5 in)
- Position: Forward

Team information
- Current team: Maccabi Holon
- Number: 23

College career
Years	Team	Apps	(Gls)
2007	Oral Roberts Golden Eagles	20	(10)
2008	Darton State College		(36)
2009–2010	West Florida Argonauts		(64)

Senior career*
Years	Team	Apps	(Gls)
2013	KR	15	(17)
2015	KR	5	(4)
2016–2017	Maccabi Kishronot Hadera	23	(21)
2017–2018	Ramat HaSharon	10	(5)
2018–	Maccabi Holon	15	(7)

International career^{‡}
2006–2008	Jamaica U20		(7)
2006–	Jamaica	12+	(23)
- * Club domestic league appearances and goals as of March 7, 2019 ‡ National team caps and goals as of 22:09, 16 March 2015 (UTC)

Shakira Duncan (born October 1, 1989) is a Jamaican footballer who plays as a forward for Israeli club Maccabi Holon FC and the Jamaica women's national team.

== College career ==
Duncan attended the Oral Roberts University, the Darton State College, and the University of West Florida.

== International career ==
Duncan represented Jamaica at two CONCACAF Women's U-20 Championship editions (2006 and 2008).

Despite scoring in Jamaica's last home friendly game before the 2019 FIFA Women's World Cup, a 3–1 win over Panama, Duncan was left out of the 23-player squad for the final tournament.

=== International goals ===
Scores and results list Jamaica's goal tally first

No.	Date	Venue	Opponent	Score	Result	Competition
1	8 May 2006	Jamaica	Saint Lucia	4–0	5–0	2006 CONCACAF Women's Gold Cup qualification
2	10 May 2006	Jamaica	Antigua and Barbuda	7–0	10–0	2006 CONCACAF Women's Gold Cup qualification
3	10 May 2006	Jamaica	Antigua and Barbuda	10–0	10–0	2006 CONCACAF Women's Gold Cup qualification
4	12 May 2006	Jamaica	Saint Kitts and Nevis	9–0	11–0	2006 CONCACAF Women's Gold Cup qualification
5	12 May 2006	Jamaica	Saint Kitts and Nevis	11–0	11–0	2006 CONCACAF Women's Gold Cup qualification
6	6 September 2006	Larry Gomes Stadium, Arima, Trinidad and Tobago	Bermuda	7–0	7–0	2006 CONCACAF Women's Gold Cup qualification
7	10 September 2006	Larry Gomes Stadium, Arima, Trinidad and Tobago	Haiti	3–0	3–0	2006 CONCACAF Women's Gold Cup qualification
8	20 June 2014	Estadio Panamericano, San Cristóbal, Dominican Republic	Saint Lucia	3–0	14–0	2014 CFU Women's Caribbean Cup
9	20 June 2014	Estadio Panamericano, San Cristóbal, Dominican Republic	Saint Lucia	6–0	14–0	2014 CFU Women's Caribbean Cup
10	20 June 2014	Estadio Panamericano, San Cristóbal, Dominican Republic	Saint Lucia	7–0	14–0	2014 CFU Women's Caribbean Cup
11	20 June 2014	Estadio Panamericano, San Cristóbal, Dominican Republic	Saint Lucia	8–0	14–0	2014 CFU Women's Caribbean Cup
12	22 June 2014	Estadio Panamericano, San Cristóbal, Dominican Republic	Dominican Republic	1–0	7–0	2014 CFU Women's Caribbean Cup
13	22 June 2014	Estadio Panamericano, San Cristóbal, Dominican Republic	Dominican Republic	2–0	7–0	2014 CFU Women's Caribbean Cup
14	22 June 2014	Estadio Panamericano, San Cristóbal, Dominican Republic	Dominican Republic	5–0	7–0	2014 CFU Women's Caribbean Cup
15	22 June 2014	Estadio Panamericano, San Cristóbal, Dominican Republic	Dominican Republic	6–0	7–0	2014 CFU Women's Caribbean Cup
16	19 August 2014	Ato Boldon Stadium, Couva, Trinidad and Tobago	Puerto Rico	2–1	4–1	2014 CFU Women's Caribbean Cup
17	19 August 2014	Ato Boldon Stadium, Couva, Trinidad and Tobago	Puerto Rico	4–1	4–1	2014 CFU Women's Caribbean Cup
18	21 August 2014	Ato Boldon Stadium, Couva, Trinidad and Tobago	Bermuda	4–0	9–1	2014 CFU Women's Caribbean Cup
19	21 August 2014	Ato Boldon Stadium, Couva, Trinidad and Tobago	Bermuda	5–0	9–1	2014 CFU Women's Caribbean Cup
20	21 August 2014	Ato Boldon Stadium, Couva, Trinidad and Tobago	Bermuda	6–0	9–1	2014 CFU Women's Caribbean Cup
21	21 August 2014	Ato Boldon Stadium, Couva, Trinidad and Tobago	Bermuda	7–1	9–1	2014 CFU Women's Caribbean Cup
22	16 October 2014	Sporting Park, Kansas City, United States	Martinique	2–0	6–0	2014 CONCACAF Women's Championship
23	18 October 2014	Toyota Park, Bridgeview, United States	Costa Rica	1–1	1–2	2014 CONCACAF Women's Championship
24	19 May 2019	National Stadium, Kingston, Jamaica	Panama	3–1	3–1	Friendly
