= Jackie Guerra (footballer) =

American-born Puerto Rican footballer

Personal information
- Full name: Jacquelyn Michelle Guerra Arnaldi
- Date of birth: 25 September 1989 (age 37)
- Place of birth: Dallas, Texas, United States
- Height: 1.57 m (5 ft 2 in)
- Position: Midfielder

Youth career
- Plano Senior High School

College career
Years	Team	Apps	(Gls)
2008–2011	Illinois Fighting Illini	38	(1)

International career^{‡}
2010–2014	Puerto Rico	6+	(2)
- ‡ National team caps and goals as of 27 May 2014

Jacquelyn Michelle Guerra Arnaldi (born 25 September 1989) is an American-born former Puerto Rican footballer who played as a midfielder. She was a member of the Puerto Rico women's national team.

== Early and personal life ==
Guerra was raised in Plano, Texas. Her parents are from Puerto Rico. She now lives in Redondo Beach, California.

== International goals ==
Scores and results list Puerto Rico's goal tally first.

No.	Date	Venue	Opponent	Score	Result	Competition
1	13 May 2010	Manny Ramjohn Stadium, Marabella, Trinidad and Tobago	Antigua and Barbuda	8–0	8–0	2010 CONCACAF Women's World Cup Qualifying qualification
2	27 May 2014	Juan Ramón Loubriel Stadium, Bayamón, Puerto Rico	Martinique	1–0	1–1	2014 CFU Women's Caribbean Cup
