= Alicia Wilson =

Alicia Wilson may refer to:

- Alicia Wilson (footballer)
- Alicia Wilson (swimmer)
