= Shenel Gall =

Caymanian footballer (born 1991)

Shenel Call
Personal information
- Date of birth: 29 August 1991 (age 35)
- Place of birth: Cayman Islands
- Position: Forward

College career
Years	Team	Apps	(Gls)
2010	Darton State Cavaliers		

Senior career*
Years	Team	Apps	(Gls)
2012	FC Indiana		
2012–2013	FC Neunkirch		

International career
2006–	Cayman Islands		
- * Club domestic league appearances and goals

Shenel Gall (born 29 August 1991) is a Caymanian former footballer who played as a forward.

== Career ==
=== Club career ===
In 2010, Gall joined Darton State Cavaliers in the United States. In 2012, she signed for FC Indiana in the United States, becoming the first professional female footballer from the Cayman Islands. In 2012, she signed for Swiss second tier club FC Neunkirch, helping them earn promotion to the Swiss top flight for the first time.

=== International career ===
At the age of 14, Gall debuted for the Cayman Islands during an 8-0 win over the Turks and Caicos Islands, where she scored 3 goals.
