= Tasha St. Louis =

Trinidadian footballer (born 1983)

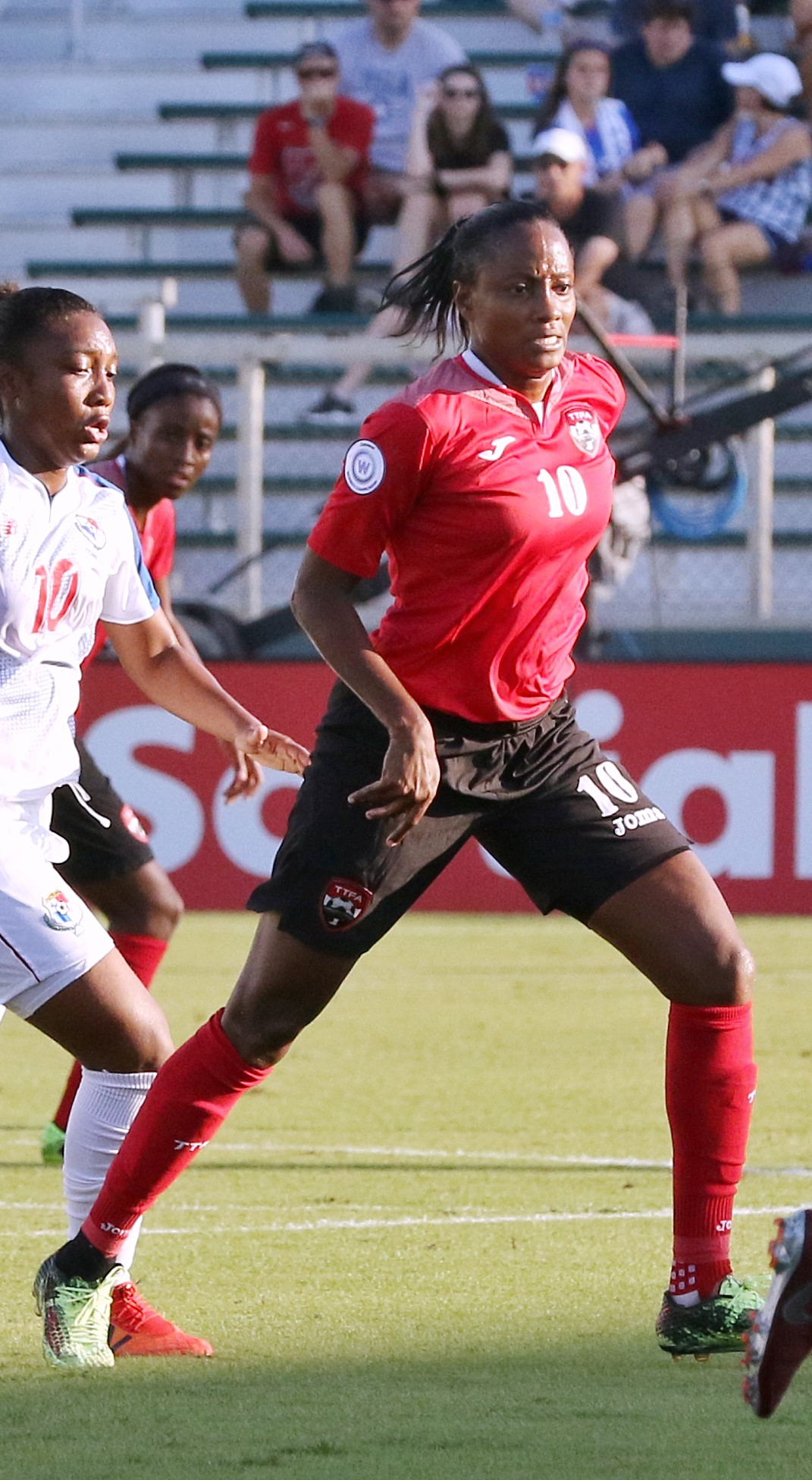

Personal information
- Full name: Tasha St. Louis
- Date of birth: 20 December 1983 (age 42)
- Place of birth: Carenage, Trinidad and Tobago
- Position: Midfielder

Team information
- Current team: St Ann's FC

Senior career*
Years	Team	Apps	(Gls)
2007	Ream Dimension		
2006–2008	New England Mutiny		
2009	Sunnanå SK	4	(0)

International career^{‡}
2001–2002	Trinidad and Tobago U-19	4+	(7)
2002–2018	Trinidad and Tobago	67+	(46)
- * Club domestic league appearances and goals as of 17 March 2015 ‡ National team caps and goals as of 11 October 2018

Tasha St. Louis (born 20 December 1983) is a Trinidadian footballer who plays as a midfielder. She has been a member of the Trinidad and Tobago women's national team, of which she is the top scorer of all time.

== International goals ==
Scores and results list Trinidad and Tobago' goal tally first.

No.	Date	Venue	Opponent	Score	Result	Competition
1	5 July 2002	Trinidad and Tobago	Dominica	?–?	13–0	2002 CONCACAF Women's Gold Cup qualification
2	27 October 2002	Pasadena, United States	Panama	2–4	2–4	2002 CONCACAF Women's Gold Cup
3	9 November 2003	André Kamperveen Stadion, Paramaribo, Suriname	Suriname	2–0	2–0	2004 CONCACAF Women's Pre-Olympic Tournament qualification
4	27 February 2004	Estadio Eladio Rosabal Cordero, Heredia, Costa Rica	Mexico	1–4	1–8	2004 CONCACAF Women's Pre-Olympic Tournament
5	19 May 2006	Larry Gomes Stadium, Arima, Trinidad and Tobago	Grenada	1–0	10–0	2006 CONCACAF Women's Gold Cup qualification
6	19 May 2006	Larry Gomes Stadium, Arima, Trinidad and Tobago	Grenada	2–0	10–0	2006 CONCACAF Women's Gold Cup qualification
7	19 May 2006	Larry Gomes Stadium, Arima, Trinidad and Tobago	Grenada	4–0	10–0	2006 CONCACAF Women's Gold Cup qualification
8	19 May 2006	Larry Gomes Stadium, Arima, Trinidad and Tobago	Grenada	6–0	10–0	2006 CONCACAF Women's Gold Cup qualification
9	21 May 2006	Larry Gomes Stadium, Arima, Trinidad and Tobago	Saint Vincent and the Grenadines	4–1	4–1	2006 CONCACAF Women's Gold Cup qualification
10	23 May 2006	Larry Gomes Stadium, Arima, Trinidad and Tobago	Dominica	1–0	6–0	2006 CONCACAF Women's Gold Cup qualification
11	6 September 2006	Larry Gomes Stadium, Arima, Trinidad and Tobago	Suriname	3–1	5–1	2006 CONCACAF Women's Gold Cup qualification
12	6 September 2006	Larry Gomes Stadium, Arima, Trinidad and Tobago	Suriname	5–1	5–1	2006 CONCACAF Women's Gold Cup qualification
13	10 September 2006	Larry Gomes Stadium, Arima, Trinidad and Tobago	Dominican Republic	1–0	7–0	2006 CONCACAF Women's Gold Cup qualification
14	10 September 2006	Larry Gomes Stadium, Arima, Trinidad and Tobago	Dominican Republic	4–0	7–0	2006 CONCACAF Women's Gold Cup qualification
15	10 September 2006	Larry Gomes Stadium, Arima, Trinidad and Tobago	Dominican Republic	5–0	7–0	2006 CONCACAF Women's Gold Cup qualification
16	2 October 2007	Dr. Ir. Franklin Essed Stadion, Paramaribo, Suriname	Saint Vincent and the Grenadines	1–0	9–0	2008 CONCACAF Women's Pre-Olympic Tournament qualification
17	2 October 2007	Dr. Ir. Franklin Essed Stadion, Paramaribo, Suriname	Saint Vincent and the Grenadines	4–0	9–0	2008 CONCACAF Women's Pre-Olympic Tournament qualification
18	4 October 2007	Dr. Ir. Franklin Essed Stadion, Paramaribo, Suriname	Grenada	2–0	6–0	2008 CONCACAF Women's Pre-Olympic Tournament qualification
19	4 October 2007	Dr. Ir. Franklin Essed Stadion, Paramaribo, Suriname	Grenada	3–0	6–0	2008 CONCACAF Women's Pre-Olympic Tournament qualification
20	4 October 2007	Dr. Ir. Franklin Essed Stadion, Paramaribo, Suriname	Grenada	5–0	6–0	2008 CONCACAF Women's Pre-Olympic Tournament qualification
21	7 October 2007	Dr. Ir. Franklin Essed Stadion, Paramaribo, Suriname	Suriname	2–0	4–1	2008 CONCACAF Women's Pre-Olympic Tournament qualification
22	7 October 2007	Dr. Ir. Franklin Essed Stadion, Paramaribo, Suriname	Suriname	4–0	4–1	2008 CONCACAF Women's Pre-Olympic Tournament qualification
23	23 November 2007	Juan Ramón Loubriel Stadium, Bayamón, Puerto Rico	Puerto Rico	2–1	2–1	2008 CONCACAF Women's Pre-Olympic Tournament qualification
24	24 July 2010	Estadio Metropolitano, Mérida, Venezuela	Nicaragua	2–0	4–0	2010 Central American and Caribbean Games
25	20 August 2014	Hasely Crawford Stadium, Port of Spain, Trinidad and Tobago	Saint Kitts and Nevis	2–0	10–0	2014 CFU Women's Caribbean Cup
26	20 August 2014	Hasely Crawford Stadium, Port of Spain, Trinidad and Tobago	Saint Kitts and Nevis	4–0	10–0	2014 CFU Women's Caribbean Cup
27	20 August 2014	Hasely Crawford Stadium, Port of Spain, Trinidad and Tobago	Saint Kitts and Nevis	6–0	10–0	2014 CFU Women's Caribbean Cup
28	22 August 2014	Hasely Crawford Stadium, Port of Spain, Trinidad and Tobago	Antigua and Barbuda	3–0	3–0	2014 CFU Women's Caribbean Cup
29	24 August 2014	Hasely Crawford Stadium, Port of Spain, Trinidad and Tobago	Martinique	2–0	7–0	2014 CFU Women's Caribbean Cup
30	24 August 2014	Hasely Crawford Stadium, Port of Spain, Trinidad and Tobago	Martinique	3–0	7–0	2014 CFU Women's Caribbean Cup
31	24 August 2014	Hasely Crawford Stadium, Port of Spain, Trinidad and Tobago	Martinique	4–0	7–0	2014 CFU Women's Caribbean Cup
32	13 November 2015	Ato Boldon Stadium, Couva, Trinidad and Tobago	Saint Lucia	2–0	6–0	2016 CONCACAF Women's Olympic Qualifying Championship qualification
33	13 November 2015	Ato Boldon Stadium, Couva, Trinidad and Tobago	Saint Lucia	3–0	6–0	2016 CONCACAF Women's Olympic Qualifying Championship qualification
34	13 November 2015	Ato Boldon Stadium, Couva, Trinidad and Tobago	Saint Lucia	4–0	6–0	2016 CONCACAF Women's Olympic Qualifying Championship qualification
35	13 November 2015	Ato Boldon Stadium, Couva, Trinidad and Tobago	Saint Lucia	5–0	6–0	2016 CONCACAF Women's Olympic Qualifying Championship qualification
36	18 November 2015	Ato Boldon Stadium, Couva, Trinidad and Tobago	Jamaica	2–1	2–1	2016 CONCACAF Women's Olympic Qualifying Championship qualification
37	11 February 2016	BBVA Compass Stadium, Houston, United States	Guatemala	2–1	2–1	2016 CONCACAF Women's Olympic Qualifying Championship
38	25 April 2018	Ato Boldon Stadium, Couva, Trinidad and Tobago	Suriname	2–0	7–0	2018 CFU Women's Challenge Series
39	19 May 2018	Ato Boldon Stadium, Couva, Trinidad and Tobago	U.S. Virgin Islands	4–0	10–0	2018 CONCACAF Women's Championship qualification
40	25 May 2018	Ato Boldon Stadium, Couva, Trinidad and Tobago	Saint Kitts and Nevis	1–1	1–1	2018 CONCACAF Women's Championship qualification
41	27 May 2018	Ato Boldon Stadium, Couva, Trinidad and Tobago	Grenada	4–0	13–0	2018 CONCACAF Women's Championship qualification
42	27 May 2018	Ato Boldon Stadium, Couva, Trinidad and Tobago	Grenada	13–0	13–0	2018 CONCACAF Women's Championship qualification
43	29 August 2018	National Stadium, Kingston, Jamaica	Antigua and Barbuda	3–0	5–0	2018 CONCACAF Women's Championship qualification
