= Gloriana Villalobos =

Costa Rican footballer (born 1999)

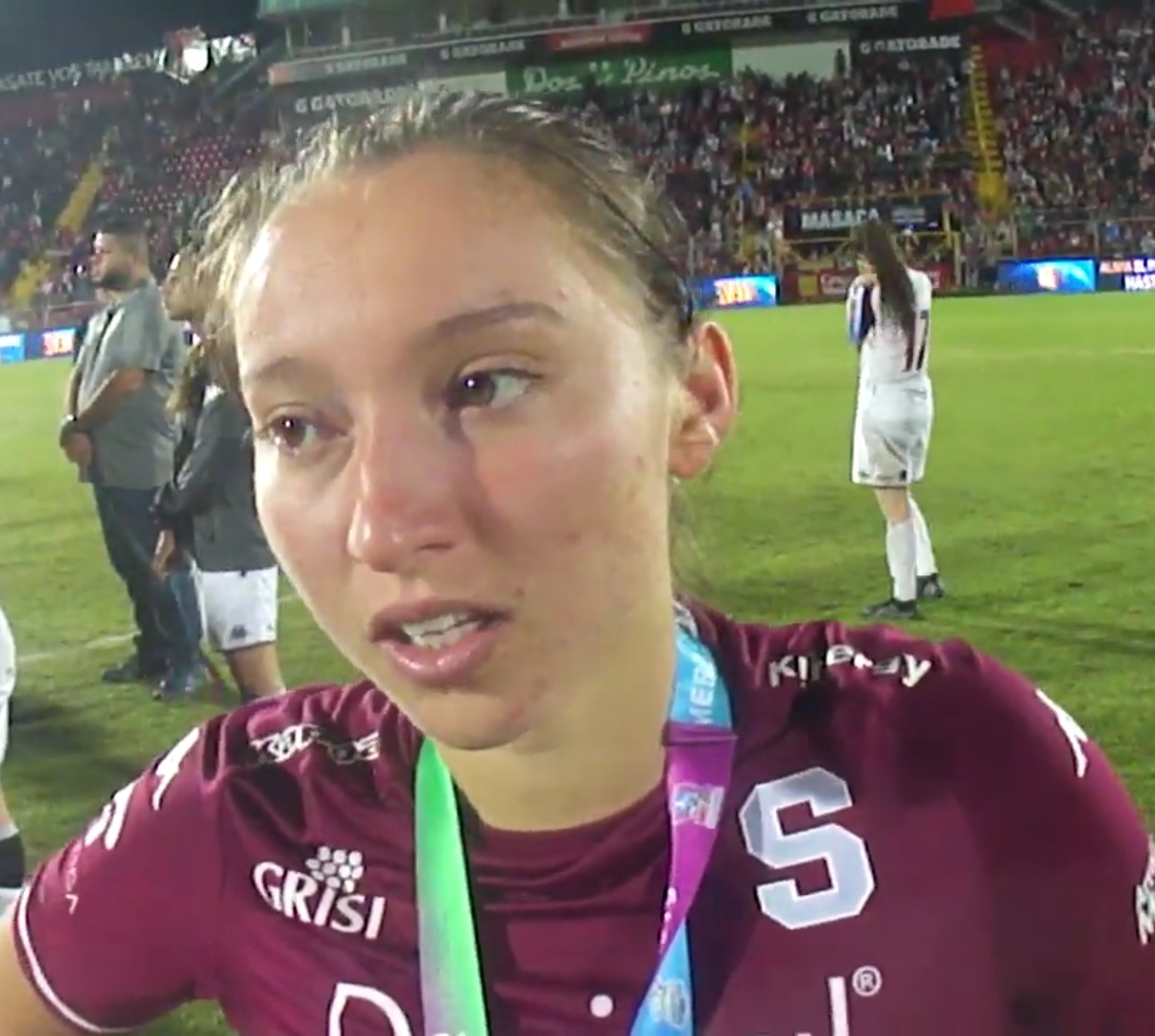
- Villalobos with Saprissa in 2019

Personal information
- Full name: Gloriana de Jesús Villalobos Vega
- Date of birth: 20 August 1999 (age 27)
- Place of birth: San José, Costa Rica
- Height: 1.63 m (5 ft 4 in)
- Position: Midfielder

Team information
- Current team: Saprissa

College career
Years	Team	Apps	(Gls)
2017–2018	Florida State Seminoles	42	(2)

Senior career*
Years	Team	Apps	(Gls)
2012–2016	Saprissa		
2019	Saprissa		
2020–2022	Herediano		
2022–	Saprissa		

International career^{‡}
2014–2016	Costa Rica U-17		
2014–2018	Costa Rica U-20	8	(0)
2014–2024	Costa Rica	66	(12)
Medal record
Women's football
Representing Costa Rica
Pan American Games
Bronze medal – third place	2019 Lima	Team
- * Club domestic league appearances and goals ‡ National team caps and goals as of 30 October 2017

Gloriana de Jesús Villalobos Vega (born 20 August 1999) is a Costa Rican footballer who plays as a midfielder for Saprissa and the Costa Rica women's national football team. In 2014, she made her senior international debut at the age of 14.

== College career ==
In 2017, Villalobos was named to the All-ACC Third Team, as well as being chosen to the 11-member All-Freshman Team. Villalobos played in all 21 matches for Florida State where she scored 1 goal and made 2 assists. Gloriana left FSU in September 2019 to play with Saprissa.

== Professional career ==
Villalobos debuted for local club Saprissa in 2012 at the age of 12.

Gloriana played with Saprissa on 2019 and lost the final match against Alajuela. After the season ended she signed with Club Sport Herediano and is playing with them since 2020.

== International play ==
In January 2014, Villaobos—yet to turn 15—led Costa Rica to qualification for the 2014 FIFA U-20 Women's World Cup, appearing in all five games at the 2014 CONCACAF Under-20 Women's Championship in the Cayman Islands.

She then shot to national prominence in March 2014, when Costa Rica hosted the 2014 FIFA U-17 Women's World Cup. She appeared in all three games as the country hosted its first FIFA event.

In May 2014, Villalobos received her first call to the senior national team in the Central American region of 2014 CONCACAF Women's Championship qualification, the first step toward the 2015 FIFA Women's World Cup. Villalobos scored in the final group game to help Costa Rica advance. In the playoff to determine which team advanced to the Pan American Games, Villalobos played again in a 3–0 Costa Rica win.

At the U-20 Women's World Cup in Canada in August 2014, Villalobos played all 270 minutes but Costa Rica was eliminated in the group stage again.

In 2017, Villalobos joined the Florida State Seminoles women's soccer team.

== International goals ==
No.	Date	Venue	Opponent	Score	Result	Competition
1.	24 May 2014	Estadio Mateo Flores, Guatemala City, Guatemala	Nicaragua	3–0	3–0	2014 CONCACAF Women's Championship qualification
2.	19 July 2018	Estadio Moderno Julio Torres, Barranquilla, Colombia	Colombia	1–0	1–0	2018 Central American and Caribbean Games
3.	23 July 2018	Estadio Moderno Julio Torres, Barranquilla, Colombia	Venezuela	2–1	2–1	2018 Central American and Caribbean Games
4.	27 August 2018	IMG Academy, Bradenton, United States	El Salvador	5–0	11–0	2018 CONCACAF Women's Championship qualification
5.	11 October 2018	H-E-B Park, Edinburg, United States	Canada	1–3	1–3	2018 CONCACAF Women's Championship
6.	17 February 2022	Estadio Nacional, San José, Costa Rica	Saint Kitts and Nevis	6–0	7–0	2022 CONCACAF W Championship qualification
7.	11 October 2022	Estadio Ricardo Saprissa Aymá, San José, Costa Rica	Philippines	2–1	2–1	Friendly
8.	25 September 2023	Estadio Alejandro Morera Soto, Alajuela, Costa Rica	Saint Kitts and Nevis	7–0	11–0	2024 CONCACAF W Gold Cup qualification
9.	30 November 2023	Estadio Alejandro Morera Soto, Alajuela, Costa Rica	Haiti	1–0	2–1	2024 CONCACAF W Gold Cup qualification
10.	4 December 2023	SKNFA Technical Center, Basseterre, St. Kitts & Nevis	Saint Kitts and Nevis	6–0	19–0	2024 CONCACAF W Gold Cup qualification
11.	3 March 2026	Dame Flora Duffy National Sports Centre, Devonshire Parish, Bermuda	Bermuda	1–0	8–0	2026 CONCACAF W Championship qualification
12.	18 April 2026	Estadio Nacional, San José, Costa Rica	Guatemala	1–0	3–0	2026 CONCACAF W Championship qualification

== Honours ==
Florida State Seminoles

- NCAA Division I Women's Soccer Championship: 2018
