= Phoenetia Browne =

St. Kitts and Nevis footballer (b. 1994)

Personal information
- Full name: Phoenetia Maiya Lureen Browne
- Date of birth: 22 April 1994 (age 32)
- Place of birth: The Bronx, New York, U.S.
- Height: 1.73 m (5 ft 8 in)
- Positions: Forward; midfielder

Team information
- Current team: Espanyol
- Number: 24

College career
Years	Team	Apps	(Gls)
2011–2014	Columbia Lions	29	(4)
2015	Texas Longhorns	9	(0)

Senior career*
Years	Team	Apps	(Gls)
2016	New Jersey Copa FC		
2017	Sindri	16	(10)
2017–2018	CSFA Ambilly	11	(6)
2018	Olimpia Cluj	3	(2)
2019	Åland United	26	(5)
2020	FH	8	(6)
2021–2022	SC Sand	36	(2)
2022–2024	Saint-Étienne	43	(13)
2024–2025	Valencia	29	(1)
2025–	Espanyol	31	(3)

International career
2009	Saint Kitts and Nevis U20	5	(0)
2010–	Saint Kitts and Nevis	15	(19)
- * Club domestic league appearances and goals

Phoenetia Maiya Lureen Browne (born 22 April 1994) is a professional footballer who plays as a forward for Liga F club Espanyol. Born in the United States, she represents Saint Kitts and Nevis at international level.

== Club career ==
During the summer of 2017, Browne played for Sindri in the 1. deild kvenna, netting ten goals in 16 matches.

In August 2020, Browne signed with Úrvalsdeild kvenna club Fimleikafélag Hafnarfjarðar.

== International goals ==
Saint Kitts and Nevis score listed first, score column indicates score after each Browne goal.

List of international goals scored by Phoenetia Browne
No.	Date	Venue	Opponent	Score	Result	Competition
1	23 May 2014	TCIFA National Academy, Providenciales, Turks and Caicos Islands	Cayman Islands	1–0	5–0	2014 CFU Women's Caribbean Cup
2	23 May 2014	TCIFA National Academy, Providenciales, Turks and Caicos Islands	Cayman Islands	2–0	5–0	2014 CFU Women's Caribbean Cup
3	23 May 2014	TCIFA National Academy, Providenciales, Turks and Caicos Islands	Cayman Islands	5–0	5–0	2014 CFU Women's Caribbean Cup
4	25 May 2014	TCIFA National Academy, Providenciales, Turks and Caicos Islands	Turks and Caicos Islands	1–0	4–0	2014 CFU Women's Caribbean Cup
5	25 May 2014	TCIFA National Academy, Providenciales, Turks and Caicos Islands	Turks and Caicos Islands	2–0	4–0	2014 CFU Women's Caribbean Cup
6	27 May 2014	TCIFA National Academy, Providenciales, Turks and Caicos Islands	Bermuda	1–2	1–3	2014 CFU Women's Caribbean Cup
7	24 August 2014	Hasely Crawford Stadium, Port of Spain, Trinidad and Tobago	Antigua and Barbuda	2–1	2–1	2014 CFU Women's Caribbean Cup
8	23 May 2018	Ato Boldon Stadium, Couva, Trinidad and Tobago	Grenada	2–0	10–0	2018 CONCACAF Women's Championship qualification
9	23 May 2018	Ato Boldon Stadium, Couva, Trinidad and Tobago	Grenada	5–0	10–0	2018 CONCACAF Women's Championship qualification
10	25 May 2018	Ato Boldon Stadium, Couva, Trinidad and Tobago	Trinidad and Tobago	1–0	1–1	2018 CONCACAF Women's Championship qualification
11	27 May 2018	Ato Boldon Stadium, Couva, Trinidad and Tobago	U.S. Virgin Islands	1–0	7–0	2018 CONCACAF Women's Championship qualification
12	27 May 2018	Ato Boldon Stadium, Couva, Trinidad and Tobago	U.S. Virgin Islands	2–0	7–0	2018 CONCACAF Women's Championship qualification
13	27 May 2018	Ato Boldon Stadium, Couva, Trinidad and Tobago	U.S. Virgin Islands	4–0	7–0	2018 CONCACAF Women's Championship qualification
14	4 October 2019	Ato Boldon Stadium, Couva, Trinidad and Tobago	Aruba	6–1	6–1	2020 CONCACAF Women's Olympic Qualifying Championship qualification
15	6 October 2019	Ato Boldon Stadium, Couva, Trinidad and Tobago	Trinidad and Tobago	2–0	4–1	2020 CONCACAF Women's Olympic Qualifying Championship qualification
16	6 October 2019	Ato Boldon Stadium, Couva, Trinidad and Tobago	Trinidad and Tobago	3–0	4–1	2020 CONCACAF Women's Olympic Qualifying Championship qualification
17	6 October 2019	Ato Boldon Stadium, Couva, Trinidad and Tobago	Trinidad and Tobago	4–1	4–1	2020 CONCACAF Women's Olympic Qualifying Championship qualification
18	8 October 2019	Ato Boldon Stadium, Couva, Trinidad and Tobago	Antigua and Barbuda	5–0	10–0	2020 CONCACAF Women's Olympic Qualifying Championship qualification
19	8 October 2019	Ato Boldon Stadium, Couva, Trinidad and Tobago	Antigua and Barbuda	6–0	10–0	2020 CONCACAF Women's Olympic Qualifying Championship qualification
