= Dernelle Mascall =

Trinidadian football midfielder (born 1988)

Personal information
- Full name: Dernelle L. Mascall
- Date of birth: 20 October 1988 (age 38)
- Place of birth: Trinidad and Tobago
- Height: 1.73 m (5 ft 8 in)
- Position: Midfielder

College career
Years	Team	Apps	(Gls)
2006	Mobile Rams	18	(9)
2007–2009	West Florida Argonauts	43+	(56)

Senior career*
Years	Team	Apps	(Gls)
2011–2013	Grindavík	22	(21)

International career^{‡}
2006–	Trinidad and Tobago	8	(1)
- * Club domestic league appearances and goals as of 17 March 2015 ‡ National team caps and goals as of 17 March 2015

Dernelle L. Mascall (born 20 October 1988) is a Trinidadian football midfielder who plays for Grindavík.

== International goals ==
Scores and results list Trinidad and Tobago' goal tally first.

No.	Date	Venue	Opponent	Score	Result	Competition
1	10 September 2006	Larry Gomes Stadium, Arima, Trinidad and Tobago	Dominican Republic	3–0	7–0	2006 CONCACAF Women's Gold Cup
2	2 November 2010	Estadio de Béisbol Beto Ávila, Cancún, Mexico	Guyana	4–1	4–1	2010 CONCACAF Women's World Cup Qualifying
3	20 August 2014	Hasely Crawford Stadium, Port of Spain, Trinidad and Tobago	Saint Kitts and Nevis	10–0	10–0	2014 CFU Women's Caribbean Cup
4	24 August 2014	Hasely Crawford Stadium, Port of Spain, Trinidad and Tobago	Martinique	7–0	7–0	2014 CFU Women's Caribbean Cup
5	18 November 2015	Ato Boldon Stadium, Couva, Trinidad and Tobago	Jamaica	1–1	2–1	2016 CONCACAF Women's Olympic Qualifying Championship qualification
