= Kelly Brena =

Martiniquais international footballer

Personal information
- Full name: Kelly Brena
- Place of birth: Martinique
- Position: Forward

International career^{‡}
Years	Team	Apps	(Gls)
2014	Martinique	2	(0)
- ‡ National team caps and goals as of 14:27, 18 March 2015 (UTC)

Kelly Brena is a Martiniquaise footballer who plays as a forward for the Martinique women's team.
