= Laura Suárez (footballer) =

Puerto Rican footballer

Personal information
- Full name: Laura Mitchell Suárez Ayala
- Date of birth: 9 December 1993 (age 32)
- Place of birth: Puerto Rico
- Position: Midfielder

Team information
- Current team: Alianza
- Number: 5

Senior career*
Years	Team	Apps	(Gls)
- Puerto Rico Sol
2021	Levante B	2	(0)
2021–	Alianza	0	(0)

International career^{‡}
2011–2012	Puerto Rico U20	5	(2)
2014–	Puerto Rico	3+	(2+)
- * Club domestic league appearances and goals as of 25 August 2021 ‡ National team caps and goals as of 7 October 2019

Laura Mitchell Suárez Ayala (born 28 July 1992) is a Puerto Rican footballer who plays as a midfielder for Salvadoran Liga Mayor de Fútbol Femenina club Alianza and the Puerto Rico women's national team.

== International goals ==
Scores and results list Puerto Rico's goal tally first.

No.	Date	Venue	Opponent	Score	Result	Competition
1	19 August 2014	Ato Boldon Stadium, Couva, Trinidad and Tobago	Jamaica	1–1	1–4	2014 CFU Women's Caribbean Cup
2	5 October 2019	Juan Ramón Loubriel Stadium, Bayamón, Puerto Rico	Suriname	4–0	6–1	2020 CONCACAF Women's Olympic Qualifying Championship qualification
2	21 February 2021	Estadio Olímpico Félix Sánchez, Santo Domingo, Dominican Republic	Dominican Republic	1–0	2–0	Friendly
