= Zahimara Fantauzzi =

Puerto Rican footballer

Personal information
- Full name: Zahimara Fantauzzi Rosado
- Date of birth: 9 December 1993 (age 32)
- Place of birth: Puerto Rico
- Height: 1.73 m (5 ft 8 in)
- Position: Forward

College career
Years	Team	Apps	(Gls)
2011–2012	LCCC Golden Eagles	35	(8)
2013–2014	Valdosta State Blazers	36	(5)

International career^{‡}
2014	Puerto Rico	1+	(1)
- ‡ National team caps and goals as of 23 August 2014

Zahimara Fantauzzi Rosado (born 9 December 1993) is a Puerto Rican footballer who plays as a forward. She has been a member of the Puerto Rico women's national team.

== Early and personal life ==
Fantauzzi was raised in Maunabo.

== International goals ==
Scores and results list Puerto Rico's goal tally first.

No.	Date	Venue	Opponent	Score	Result	Competition
1	23 August 2014	Ato Boldon Stadium, Couva, Trinidad and Tobago	Bermuda	2–0	5–1	2014 CFU Women's Caribbean Cup
