= Diana Barrera =

American-born Guatemalan footballer

Personal information
- Full name: Diana Barrera
- Date of birth: 20 January 1987 (age 39)
- Place of birth: Wheaton, Maryland, United States
- Height: 1.70 m (5 ft 7 in)
- Position: Forward

Team information
- Current team: ACF Torino USA

College career
Years	Team	Apps	(Gls)
2005–2008	Albany Great Danes		

Senior career*
Years	Team	Apps	(Gls)
- ACF Torino USA

International career^{‡}
2014–	Guatemala	3	(0)
- * Club domestic league appearances and goals ‡ National team caps and goals as of March 13, 2015

Diana Barrera (born 20 January 1987) is an American-born Guatemalan footballer. She plays for the Guatemala women's national football team and ACF Torino in the Women's Premier Soccer League (WPSL). She previously played for the University at Albany.

== See also ==
- List of Guatemala women's international footballers
