= Lindsay Zullo =

Haitian footballer (born 1991)

Personal information
- Full name: Lindsay Michelle Zullo
- Date of birth: 3 May 1991 (age 35)
- Place of birth: Hudson, Florida, United States
- Height: 5 ft 3 in (1.60 m)
- Position: Forward

Team information
- Current team: F.C. Indiana

Youth career
- 2007–2009: Hudson High School

College career
Years	Team	Apps	(Gls)
2009–2012	Flagler College	62	(17)

Senior career*
Years	Team	Apps	(Gls)
2013–	F.C. Indiana		

International career^{‡}
2014–	Haiti	6	(2)
- * Club domestic league appearances and goals ‡ National team caps and goals as of 13:22, 20 March 2015 (UTC)

Lindsay Michelle Zullo (born 3 May 1991) is an American-born Haitian footballer who plays as a forward. She has been a member of the Haiti women's national team.

== Early years ==
Zullo a native of Hudson, Florida, played varsity during her junior and senior years at Hudson High School leading her team to a pair of district championships. Named captain as a senior, she participated in the Senior All-Star Game. She became an honorable mention All-State selection, named Pasco County Player of the Year and earned first-team All-Conference honors.

Zullo played 47 games, totaling 54 goals (1.1 gpg) and 21 assists; all far above national averages.

== Club career ==
Zullo plays for F.C. Indiana, based out of New Paris, Indiana, of the Women's Professional Soccer League (WPSL) and was selected as a WPSL All-Star for the region in 2014.

== International career ==
In 2014, Zullo debuted for the Haiti women's national football team, leading the selection to a third-place finish in the Caribbean Cup scoring a goal against Trinidad and Tobago.

At the opening of the 2014 CONCACAF Women's Championship, Zullo scored a goal against Guatemala that won the game 1–0.

Zullo was recruited by Shek Borkowski, head coach of the Haitian selection and also at F.C. Indiana, who was actively recruiting Haitian-American players.
