= Christian Recinos =

American-born Guatemalan footballer

Personal information
- Full name: Christian Recinos
- Date of birth: 24 December 1994 (age 31)
- Place of birth: Arlington, Texas, United States
- Height: 5 ft 5 in (1.65 m)
- Position: Midfielder

College career
Years	Team	Apps	(Gls)
2013–2014	Tyler Apaches		
2015–2016	Grand Canyon Antelopes		

International career^{‡}
2013–	Guatemala	20	(2)
- ‡ National team caps and goals as of March 13, 2015

Christian "Kiki" Recinos (born 24 December 1994) is an American-born Guatemalan footballer who plays as a midfielder.
