= Manoucheka Pierre Louis =

Haitian footballer (born 1989)

Personal information
- Full name: Manoucheka Pierre Louis
- Date of birth: 24 June 1989 (age 37)
- Place of birth: Haiti
- Position: Midfielder

Senior career*
Years	Team	Apps	(Gls)
2011	Quebec City Amiral SC		

International career^{‡}
2010–	Haiti	16	(4)
- * Club domestic league appearances and goals ‡ National team caps and goals as of 13:04, 20 March 2015 (UTC)

Manoucheka Pierre Louis (born 24 June 1989) is a Haitian women's association football player who plays as a midfielder.
