= 2006 CONCACAF Women's Gold Cup =

Tournament details
- Host country: United States
- Dates: November 19–26
- Teams: 6 (from 1 confederation)

Final positions
- Champions: United States (6th title)
- Runners-up: Canada
- Third place: Mexico
- Fourth place: Jamaica

Tournament statistics
- Matches played: 6
- Goals scored: 17 (2.83 per match)
- Top scorer(s): (Mexico) Maribel Domínguez (Mexico) Mónica Ocampo (Canada) Christine Sinclair (United States) Abby Wambach (2 goals)
- Best player: (United States) Kristine Lilly
- Best goalkeeper: (Canada) Erin McLeod

The 2006 CONCACAF Women's Gold Cup was the seventh edition of the CONCACAF Women's Gold Cup, and also acted as a qualifier tournament for the 2007 FIFA Women's World Cup. The final tournament took place in the United States between November 19 and 27, 2006. The United States and Canada received byes into the semi-finals of the tournament after contesting the final of the 2002 Gold Cup, while four other spots were determined through regional qualification.

The United States won the competition with Canada, as the runner-up. Both teams automatically qualified for the 2007 Women's World Cup, while third place Mexico lost to AFC fourth-place finisher Japan in a play-off for a spot.

== Teams ==
Pre-qualified

- United States
- Canada

North and Central America Qualifying

- Mexico
- Panama

Caribbean Qualifying

- Jamaica
- Trinidad and Tobago

== Qualification ==
=== UNCAF/NAFU Qualifying ===
The group winners qualified for the Gold Cup finals.

Group A

Team	GP	W	D	L	GF	GA	Pts
Mexico	2	2	0	0	17	0	6
Nicaragua	2	1	0	1	2	10	3
El Salvador	2	0	0	2	1	10	0
Belize	0	0	0	0	0	0	0

May 10, 2006

Mexico	9–0	Nicaragua

Mexico

May 12, 2006

Nicaragua	2–1	El Salvador

Mexico

May 14, 2006

Mexico	8–0	El Salvador

Mexico

Group B

Team	GP	W	D	L	GF	GA	Pts
Panama	2	2	0	0	5	0	6
Guatemala	2	1	0	1	2	4	3
Costa Rica	2	0	0	2	1	4	0
Honduras	0	0	0	0	0	0	0

May 24, 2006

Guatemala	2–1	Costa Rica

Panama

May 26, 2006

Panama	2–0	Costa Rica

Panama

May 28, 2006

Panama	3–0	Guatemala
Machado 10'; De Mera 24'; Aguilar 76'	Report

Estadio Rommel Fernández, Panama City, Panama

=== CFU Qualifying ===
Also known as the Women's Caribbean Cup, there were two spots available for the 22 teams taking part.

==== Preliminary round ====
Team 1	Agg.	Team 2	1st leg	2nd leg
Barbados	0–1	**Antigua and Barbuda**	0–1	0–0
Cayman Islands	1–3	**Netherlands Antilles**	1–2	1–0
British Virgin Islands	1–8	(United States Virgin Islands) **U.S. Virgin Islands**	1–3	0–5
**Turks and Caicos Islands**	w.o.^{[1]}	(The Bahamas) Bahamas		
**Grenada**	w.o.^{[1]}	Guyana		
**Saint Kitts and Nevis**	w.o.^{[1]}	Montserrat		

- Bahamas, Guyana and Montserrat withdrew.
March 12, 2006

Barbados	0–1	Antigua and Barbuda

Barbados
March 18, 2006

Antigua and Barbuda	0–0	Barbados

Antigua and Barbuda

Antigua and Barbuda won 1–0 on aggregate.

March 18, 2006

Cayman Islands	1–2	Netherlands Antilles

Cayman Islands
March 25, 2006

Netherlands Antilles	1–0	Cayman Islands

Netherlands Antilles

Netherlands Antilles won 3–1 on aggregate.

April 1, 2006

British Virgin Islands	1–3	U.S. Virgin Islands

British Virgin Islands
April 9, 2006

U.S. Virgin Islands	5–0	British Virgin Islands

US Virgin Islands

US Virgin Islands won 8–1 on aggregate.

==== First round ====
The group winners, in bold, qualified for the final round. Haiti were unable to participate in group B, as they were denied entry to the hosting country Aruba, and thus a play-off between the winners of group B, Suriname, and Haiti was arranged. Haiti won the play-off, but Suriname qualified as best runners-up owing to goal difference, along with Bermuda.

Group A
**Country**	**Pts**	**Pld**	**W**	**D**	**L**	**GF**	**GA**	**GD**
**Dominican Republic**	**9**	**3**	**3**	**0**	**0**	**11**	**2**	**+11**
Bermuda	6	3	2	0	1	9	4	+5
U.S. Virgin Islands	3	3	1	0	2	4	7	−3
Turks and Caicos Islands	0	3	0	0	3	0	11	−11

Group C
**Country**	**Pts**	**Pld**	**W**	**D**	**L**	**GF**	**GA**	**GD**
**Jamaica**	**9**	**3**	**3**	**0**	**0**	**27**	**0**	**+27**
Saint Lucia	6	3	2	0	1	5	8	−3
Saint Kitts and Nevis	3	3	1	0	2	5	16	−11
Antigua and Barbuda	0	3	0	0	3	3	16	−13

Group B
**Country**	**Pts**	**Pld**	**W**	**D**	**L**	**GF**	**GA**	**GD**
Haiti were denied entry, but were allowed play-off with group winners Suriname
Suriname	6	2	2	0	0	10	1	+9
Netherlands Antilles	3	2	1	0	1	3	8	−5
Aruba	0	2	0	0	2	1	5	−4

Group D
**Country**	**Pts**	**Pld**	**W**	**D**	**L**	**GF**	**GA**	**GD**
**Trinidad and Tobago**	**9**	**3**	**3**	**0**	**0**	**20**	**1**	**+19**
Saint Vincent and the Grenadines	6	3	2	0	1	8	4	+4
Dominica	1	3	0	1	2	2	10	−8
Grenada	1	3	0	1	2	2	17	−15

Group A

May 4, 2006

Dominican Republic	3–1	U.S. Virgin Islands

Dominican Republic

May 4, 2006

Bermuda	4–0	Turks and Caicos Islands

Dominican Republic

May 6, 2006

Bermuda	4–1	U.S. Virgin Islands

Dominican Republic

May 6, 2006

Dominican Republic	5–0	Turks and Caicos Islands

Dominican Republic

May 8, 2006

U.S. Virgin Islands	2–0	Turks and Caicos Islands

Dominican Republic

May 8, 2006

Dominican Republic	3–1	Bermuda

Dominican Republic

Group B

May 3, 2006

Suriname	7–1	Netherlands Antilles

Aruba

May 5, 2006

Aruba	1–2	Netherlands Antilles

Aruba

May 7, 2006

Aruba	0–3	Suriname

Aruba

Playoff

May 29, 2006

Suriname	0–3	Haiti

Suriname

Group C

May 8, 2006

Saint Kitts and Nevis	3–2	Antigua and Barbuda

Jamaica

May 8, 2006

Jamaica	5–0	Saint Lucia
V. Reid 4'; Davis 45'; Parker 64'; Duncan 70'; N. Reid 89'

Jamaica

May 10, 2006

Saint Lucia	3–2	Saint Kitts and Nevis

Jamaica

May 10, 2006

Jamaica	10–0	Antigua and Barbuda
Mitchell 1', 21', 38'; V. Reid 5', 82', 90'; Parker 26'; Davis 60'; Duncan 71', 90+1'

Jamaica

May 12, 2006

Antigua and Barbuda	1–2	Saint Lucia

Jamaica

May 12, 2006

Jamaica	11–0	Saint Kitts and Nevis
N. Reid 5', 26', 32'; Parker 9'; Davis 21'; V. Reid 38', 69'; Bell 42'; Jackson 45' (pen.); Duncan 55', 89'

Jamaica

Group D

May 19, 2006

Saint Vincent and the Grenadines	2–0	Dominica
	Report

Larry Gomes Stadium, Arima, Trinidad and Tobago

May 19, 2006

Trinidad and Tobago	10–0	Grenada
St. Louis 20' (pen.), 23', 41', 57'; Mollon 37', 54', 59', 63'; Cooper 68'; Cordner 73'	Report

Larry Gomes Stadium, Arima, Trinidad and Tobago

May 21, 2006

Dominica	2–2	Grenada
	Report

Larry Gomes Stadium, Arima, Trinidad and Tobago

May 21, 2006

Trinidad and Tobago	4–1	Saint Vincent and the Grenadines
Douglas 67'; Cordner 69'; Burgin 87'; St. Louis 90'	Report	Robinson 89'

Larry Gomes Stadium, Arima, Trinidad and Tobago

May 23, 2006

Grenada	0–5	Saint Vincent and the Grenadines
	Report

Larry Gomes Stadium, Arima, Trinidad and Tobago

May 23, 2006

Trinidad and Tobago	6–0	Dominica
St. Louis 10' ? 47' (o.g.); Douglas 48', 54'; Burgin 75'; Mollon 89'	Report

Larry Gomes Stadium, Arima, Trinidad and Tobago

==== Final round ====
Trinidad & Tobago hosted the final round, consisting of two groups of three teams, between September 6 and 10. The winner of each group, in bold, have qualified for the Gold Cup finals.

Group A

Team	Pts	Pld	W	D	L	GF	GA	GD
**Trinidad and Tobago**	**6**	**2**	**2**	**0**	**0**	**12**	**1**	**+11**
Dominican Republic	3	2	1	0	1	2	7	−5
Suriname	0	2	0	0	2	1	7	−6

September 6, 2006
19:00

Trinidad and Tobago	5–1	Suriname
James 13'; Russell 36'; St. Louis 62', 77'; Douglas 66'	(Report)	Rigters 7'

Larry Gomes Stadium, Arima

September 8, 2006
17:00

Suriname	0–2	Dominican Republic
	(Report)	Jiménez 76'; Valerio 90'

Hasely Crawford Stadium, Port of Spain

September 10, 2006
18:00

Dominican Republic	0–7	Trinidad and Tobago
	(Report)	St. Louis 10', 53' (pen.), 57' (pen.); James 13'; Mascall 45'; Russell 68'; Cordner 71'

Larry Gomes Stadium, Arima

Group B

Team	Pts	Pld	W	D	L	GF	GA	GD
**Jamaica**	**6**	**2**	**2**	**0**	**0**	**10**	**0**	**+10**
Haiti	3	2	1	0	1	5	3	+2
Bermuda	0	2	0	0	2	0	12	−12

September 6, 2006
17:00

Jamaica	7–0	Bermuda
Davis 19', 76'; Reid 33', 61', 83', 88'; Duncan 89'	(Report)

Larry Gomes Stadium, Arima

September 8, 2006
19:00

Bermuda	0–5	Haiti
	(Report)	Joseph 16', 74'; Libertin 42', 65'; Dolce 76'

Hasely Crawford Stadium, Port of Spain

September 10, 2006
16:00

Haiti	0–3	Jamaica
	(Report)	Mitchell 38'; Reid 48'; Duncan 89'

Larry Gomes Stadium, Arima

== Final tournament ==
=== First round ===
November 19, 2006
17:00

Jamaica	2–0	Panama
Sullivan 4'; Reid 59'	(Report)

Tropical Park Stadium, Miami, Florida
Attendance: 800
November 19, 2006
19:30

Mexico	3–0	Trinidad and Tobago
P. Pérez 20'; González 45'; Domínguez 67'	(Report)

Tropical Park Stadium, Miami, Florida
Attendance: 3,135

=== Semifinals ===
Winners qualified for 2007 FIFA Women's World Cup.

November 22, 2006
16:30

Canada	4–0	Jamaica
Sinclair 40', 71'; Wilkinson 51'; Booth 88'	(Report)

The Home Depot Center, Carson, California
Attendance: 6,128
November 22, 2006
19:00

United States	2–0	Mexico
Wambach 10', 64'	(Report)

The Home Depot Center, Carson, California
Attendance: 6,128

=== Third place play-off ===
Winner advanced to AFC–CONCACAF play-off.

November 26, 2006
15:00

Jamaica	0–3	Mexico
	(Report)	Ocampo 19' (pen.), 37'; Domínguez 22'

The Home Depot Center, Carson, California
Attendance: 6,749

=== Final ===
November 26, 2006
17:30

Canada	1–2 (aet)	United States
Hermuss 44'	(Report)	Osborne 6'; Lilly 120' (pen.)

The Home Depot Center, Carson, California
Attendance: 6,749

== Awards ==
2006 Women's Gold Cup winners

United States
Sixth title
