= Saint Vincent and the Grenadines women's national football team =

Women's national association football team

Saint Vincent and the Grenadines
- Association: Saint Vincent and the Grenadines; Football Federation
- Confederation: CONCACAF
- FIFA code: VIN
First colours	Second colours

FIFA ranking
- Current: 160 ▼1 (16 June 2026)
- Highest: 92 (July 2003)
- Lowest: 164 (December 2025)

First international
- Saint Vincent and the Grenadines 5–0 Dominica (30 April 2000)

Biggest win
- Saint Vincent and the Grenadines 5–0 Dominica (30 April 2000); Grenada 0–5 Saint Vincent and the Grenadines (Arima, Trinidad and Tobago; 23 May 2006)

Biggest defeat
- Saint Vincent and the Grenadines 0–14 Mexico (Kingstown, Saint Vincent and the Grenadines; 29 November 2025)

The Saint Vincent and the Grenadines women's national football team is the national women's football team of Saint Vincent and the Grenadines and is overseen by the Saint Vincent and the Grenadines Football Federation.

== Results and fixtures ==
The following is a list of match results in the last 12 months, as well as any future matches that have been scheduled.

Legend

Win Draw Lose Fixture

=== 2025 ===
29 November 2026 CONCACAF W Championship Q	Saint Vincent and the Grenadines	0–14	Mexico	Kingstown, Saint Vincent and the Grenadines
19:00 UTC−4		Report	Corral 6', 22', 45', 61', 86', 90', 90+3'; Ovalle 14', 57', 65'; Camberos 25'; Soto 55'; Saldívar 73'; Sánchez 75'	Stadium: Arnos Vale Stadium; Referee: Merlin Soto (Honduras)

21 November Friendly	Saint Vincent and the Grenadines	3-0	Dominica

== Players ==
=== Current squad ===
- The following players were named to the squad to play the 2026 CONCACAF W Championship qualification game against Mexico on 29 November 2025

No.	Pos.	Player	Date of birth (age)	Caps	Goals	Club
1	GK	Altica Benn (captain)	29 November 1997 (age 28)			(Saint Vincent and the Grenadines Football Federation) System 3
	GK	Tishana James	9 July 2004 (age 22)			
	GK	Zilla Drayton				
	DF	Azumi Quow				
	DF	Rae-Dawn Nanton	2 December 2000 (age 25)			
	DF	Melanie Stowe	16 August 2005 (age 21)			
	DF	De'Andrea Barbour	4 April 2003 (age 23)			
	DF	Shanyah Peters	26 July 2000 (age 26)			(United States Soccer Federation) Union Bulldogs
	DF	Kelisha Bowens	7 June 2007 (age 19)			(Saint Vincent and the Grenadines Football Federation) Camdonia Chelsea
18	DF	Samayaa Connel	19 September 2006 (age 20)			(Saint Vincent and the Grenadines Football Federation) SV United
	DF	Kendra Findlay	22 September 2004 (age 22)			
	MF	Chelsea Cordice				
	MF	Cherish La Boarde	23 March 2008 (age 18)			
11	MF	Dionte Delpeche	4 December 2001 (age 24)			(United States Soccer Federation) Union Bulldogs
4	MF	Ashante Browne	31 January 2002 (age 24)			(Saint Vincent and the Grenadines Football Federation) Toni Store Jugglers
	MF	Denella Creese	7 January 2003 (age 23)			
10	MF	Neveah Richards	11 August 2007 (age 19)			
	MF	Sonja Mckie				
	FW	Areka Hooper	7 April 2005 (age 21)			(Saint Vincent and the Grenadines Football Federation) North Leeward Predators
14	FW	Asanteni Charles	16 December 1997 (age 28)	2	0	(The Football Association) Billericay Town
	FW	Kianna Logan				
	FW	Kitanna Richards	22 November 2001 (age 24)			
	FW	Meyia Wilson				

=== Recent call ups ===
Pos.	Player	Date of birth (age)	Caps	Goals	Club	Latest call-up

== Competitive record ==
=== FIFA Women's World Cup ===
FIFA Women's World Cup
Year	Result	GP	W	D*	L	GF	GA	GD
(China) 1991	Did not enter							
(Sweden) 1995	Did not enter							
(United States) 1999	Did not enter							
(United States) 2003	Did not enter							
(China) 2007	Did not qualify							
(Germany) 2011	Did not qualify							
(Canada) 2015	Did not qualify							
(France) 2019	Did not qualify							
(Australia) (New Zealand) 2023	Did not qualify							
(Brazil) 2027	Did not qualify							
(Costa Rica) (Jamaica) (Mexico) (United States) 2031	To be determined							
(United Kingdom) 2035	To be determined							
Total	0/10	–	–	–	–	–	–	–

*Draws include knockout matches decided on penalty kicks.

=== Olympic Games ===
Summer Olympics record									Qualifying record					
Year	Round	Position	Pld	W	D*	L	GF	GA	Pld	W	D*	L	GF	GA
(United States) 1996 to (Greece) 2004	Did not enter								Did not enter					
(China) 2008	Did not qualify								3	0	0	3	3	22
(United Kingdom) 2012	Did not enter								Did not enter					
(Brazil) 2016	Did not enter								Did not enter					
(Japan) 2020	Did not enter								Did not enter					
(France) 2024	Did not qualify								2022 CONCACAF W Championship					
(United States) 2028	Did not qualify								2026 CONCACAF W Championship					
Total	–	–	–	–	–	–	–	–	3	0	0	3	3	22

*Draws include knockout matches decided on penalty kicks.

=== CONCACAF W Championship record ===
CONCACAF W Championship record								Qualification record					
Year	Result	GP	W	D*	L	GF	GA	GP	W	D*	L	GF	GA
(Haiti) 1991	Did not enter							Did not enter					
(United States) 1993	Did not enter							Did not enter					
(Canada) 1994	Did not enter							Did not enter					
(Canada) 1998	Did not enter							Did not enter					
(United States) 2000	Did not enter							Did not enter					
(United States) (Canada) 2002	Did not enter							Did not enter					
(United States) 2006	Did not qualify							3	2	0	1	8	4
(Mexico) 2010	Did not qualify							2	0	0	2	0	2
(United States) 2014	Did not qualify							2014 Caribbean Cup					
(United States) 2018	Did not qualify							3	0	0	3	1	4
(Mexico) 2022	Did not qualify							4	1	0	3	6	17
(United States) 2026	Did not qualify							4	2	0	2	2	24
Total	0/12	–	–	–	–	–	–	16	5	0	11	17	51

*Draws include knockout matches decided on penalty kicks.

=== CONCACAF W Gold Cup ===
CONCACAF W Gold Cup record								Qualification record							
Year	Result	GP	W	D*	L	GF	GA	Division	Group	GP	W	D*	L	GF	GA
(United States) 2024	Did not qualify							B	C	6	1	0	5	4	26
(N/A) 2029	To be determined							To be determined							
Total	–	–	–	–	–	–	–	–	–	6	1	0	5	4	26

*Draws include knockout matches decided on penalty kicks.

=== CFU Women's Caribbean Cup ===
CFU Women's Caribbean Cup record
Year	Result	Pld	W	D*	L	GF	GA
(Haiti) 2000	Fourth Place	3	0	0	3	2	12
(Trinidad and Tobago) 2014	First Round	3	1	1	1	2	1
(Saint Kitts and Nevis) 2018	N/A	3	0	0	3	0	6
Total	–	9	1	1	7	4	19

*Draws include knockout matches decided on penalty kicks.

== Honours ==
=== Regional ===
- CFU Women's Caribbean Cup
  - Fourth Place (1): 2000
- Windward Islands Tournament
  - (gold) Champions(2): 2015, 2019
  - (silver) Runner-up(1): 2016
