= Prisca Carin =

Martiniquaise footballer

Personal information
- Full name: Prisca Carin
- Date of birth: 1 December 1989 (age 36)
- Place of birth: Martinique
- Position: Forward

Team information
- Current team: Club Franciscain

Senior career*
Years	Team	Apps	(Gls)
2014-2021	St. Joseph's	60	(157)
2021	Club Franciscain	44	(133)

International career
2014	Martinique	21	(7)
- * Club domestic league appearances and goals

Prisca Carin is a Martiniquaise footballer who plays as a forward for the Martinique women's team.

== Career statistics ==
=== Club ===
Club	Season	Division	League		Cup		Total	
Club	Season	Division	Apps	Goals	Apps	Goals	Apps	Goals
Saint Joseph	2014-15	R1 Féminin	16	39			16	39
Saint Joseph	2015-16	R1 Féminin	16	36			16	36
Saint Joseph	2016-17	R1 Féminin	16	58	1	1	17	59
Saint Joseph	2017-18	R1 Féminin	6	12	1	1	7	13
Saint Joseph	2019-20	R1 Féminin	4	5			4	5
Saint Joseph	2020-21	R1 Féminin	2	7	1	4	3	11
Saint Joseph	Total		60	157	3	6	63	163
San Franciscain	2022-23	R1 Féminin	18	52			18	52
San Franciscain	2023-24	R1 Féminin	10	30	4	9	14	39
San Franciscain	2024-25	R1 Féminin	16	51	4	8	20	59
San Franciscain	2025-26	R1 Féminin			7	19	7	19
San Franciscain	2026-27	R1 Féminin			2	6	2	6
San Franciscain	Total		44	133	17	42	61	175
Total career			104	290	20	48	124	338
