= Aurélie Rouge =

Martiniquaise footballer (born 1992)

Personal information
- Full name: Aurélie Celia Rouge
- Date of birth: 25 May 1992 (age 34)
- Place of birth: Schœlcher, Martinique
- Positions: Forward; defender

Senior career*
Years	Team	Apps	(Gls)
2009–2011	FF Yzeure Allier Auvergne	6	(0)
2016–2017	Aurillac Arpajon	0	(0)
2017–2020	ASJ Soyaux	44	(1)

International career^{‡}
2014–	Martinique	3	(0)
- * Club domestic league appearances and goals as of 05 August 2019 (UTC) ‡ National team caps and goals as of 14:25, 18 March 2015 (UTC)

Aurélie Celia Rouge (born 25 May 1992) is a Martiniquaise footballer who plays as a forward for the Martinique women's team. She previously played for FF Yzeure Allier Auvergne.

== Early life ==
Rouge began playing football at the age of six for a local club. At age 13, she joined Rivière Pilote.

== Playing career ==
=== International ===
Rouge competed with the Martinique women's football team at the 2014 CONCACAF Women's Championship.
