= Sherona Forrester =

Jamaican footballer (born 1991)

Personal information
- Full name: Sherona Forrester
- Date of birth: 4 November 1991 (age 35)
- Place of birth: Jamaica
- Position: Midfielder

International career^{‡}
Years	Team	Apps	(Gls)
2014–	Jamaica	3	(0)
- ‡ National team caps and goals as of 21:53, 16 March 2015 (UTC)

Sherona Forrester (born 4 November 1991) is a Jamaican international football midfielder. She has a BSc. in economics and a master's degree in Economics and Statistics from the University of the West Indies. In 2015, she was named the 2016 Rhodes Scholar of Jamaica.
