= Cayman Islands women's national football team =

Women's national association football team representing the Cayman Islands

Cayman Islands
- Association: Cayman Islands; Football Association
- Confederation: CONCACAF
- Head coach: Chandler González
- FIFA code: CAY
First colours	Second colours

FIFA ranking
- Current: 186 (16 June 2026)
- Highest: 108 (July 2003; March 2009)
- Lowest: 185 (December 2025)

First international
- Cayman Islands 0–4 Jamaica (7 May 2000)

Biggest win
- Cayman Islands 3–0 Turks and Caicos Islands (Providenciales, Turks and Caicos Islands; 27 May 2014)

Biggest defeat
- Costa Rica 21–0 Cayman Islands (Alajuela, Costa Rica; 10 April 2026)

The Cayman Islands women's national football team is the national women's football team of the Cayman Islands and is overseen by the Cayman Islands Football Association.

== Results and fixtures ==
The following is a list of match results in the last 12 months, as well as any future matches that have been scheduled.

Legend

Win Draw Lose Fixture

=== 2025 ===
27 November 2025 2026 CONCACAF W Championship Q	Cayman Islands	0–4	Bermuda	George Town
19:00 UTC−5		Report (FIFA); Report (CONCACAF)	Frazzoni 2'; Thompson 13'; Masters 40'; Christopher 68'	Stadium: Truman Bodden Sports Complex; Referee: Crystal Sobers (Trinidad and Tobago)

== Coaching staff ==
=== Managerial history ===
- (Mexico) Ruben Flores (2014–2021)
- (Cuba) Chandler González (2021–???)
- Micheal Jhoson (???-)

== Players ==
=== Current squad ===
- The following players were named to the squad to play the 2026 CONCACAF W Championship qualification games against Bermuda 27 November 2025, respectively.

No.	Pos.	Player	Date of birth (age)	Caps	Goals	Club
	GK	Naomi Wilson	29 January 2008 (age 18)			
	GK	Ericia Burke	8 March 2002 (age 24)			
	DF	Estella Ridley	8 October 2008 (age 18)			
	DF	Shardaye Powell	29 January 2009 (age 17)			
	DF	Samira Mellaneo	25 September 2006 (age 20)			(United States Soccer Federation) Barry Buccaneers
8	DF	Brittni Ebanks	20 December 1993 (age 32)			
	DF	Tessa Clark	23 January 2010 (age 16)			
	DF	Hayleigh Solomon	26 February 2009 (age 17)			
	MF	Harper Nelson	29 September 2008 (age 18)			
9	MF	Neesah Godet	2 February 1997 (age 29)			
10	MF	Tyanna Jan				
	MF	Cayden Coles	25 June 2008 (age 18)			
	MF	Chelsea Brown	5 October 1996 (age 30)			
	MF	Kaela Ebanks	7 September 1994 (age 32)			
	MF	Shanice Monteith	21 April 1993 (age 33)			
	FW	Olivia Ridley	23 November 2010 (age 15)			
	FW	Cosabella Windsor	1 April 2009 (age 17)			
	FW	Lea Dos Santos Smith	17 April 2008 (age 18)			
	FW	Tamoy Phillips	12 May 2001 (age 25)			
	FW	Reese Bateson	4 February 2010 (age 16)			
	FW	Jada Dixon-Lam	18 March 2010 (age 16)			
11	FW	Courtney Hicks	25 February 2002 (age 24)			
17	FW	Clara De Quintal	9 September 2009 (age 17)			

=== Recent call ups ===
Pos.	Player	Date of birth (age)	Caps	Goals	Club	Latest call-up

== Competitive record ==
=== FIFA Women's World Cup ===
FIFA Women's World Cup
Year	Result	GP	W	D*	L	GF	GA
(China) 1991	Did not enter						
(Sweden) 1995	Did not enter						
(United States) 1999	Did not enter						
(United States) 2003	Did not enter						
(China) 2007	Did not qualify						
(Germany) 2011	Did not enter						
(Canada) 2015	Did not qualify						
(France) 2019	Did not qualify						
(Australia) (New Zealand) 2023	Did not qualify						
(Brazil) 2027	Did not qualify						
(Costa Rica) (Jamaica) (Mexico) (United States) 2031	To be determined						
(United Kingdom) 2035	To be determined						
Total	0/10	-	-	-	-	-	-

*Draws include knockout matches decided on penalty kicks.

=== Olympic Games ===
Summer Olympics record									Qualifying record					
Year	Round	Position	Pld	W	D*	L	GF	GA	Pld	W	D*	L	GF	GA
(United States) 1996 to (Australia) 2000	Did not enter								Did not enter					
(Greece) 2004	Did not qualify								2	0	0	2	0	4
(China) 2008	Did not qualify								2	0	0	2	2	7
(United Kingdom) 2012	Did not enter								Did not enter					
(Brazil) 2016	Withdrew								Withdrew					
(Japan) 2020	Did not enter								Did not enter					
(France) 2024	Did not qualify								2022 CONCACAF W Championship					
(United States) 2028	Did not qualify								2026 CONCACAF W Championship					
Total	–	–	–	–	–	–	–	–	4	0	0	4	2	11

*Draws include knockout matches decided on penalty kicks.

=== CONCACAF W Championship ===
CONCACAF W Championship								Qualification record					
Year	Result	GP	W	D*	L	GF	GA	GP	W	D*	L	GF	GA
(Haiti) 1991	Did not enter							Did not enter					
(United States) 1993	Did not enter							Did not enter					
(Canada) 1994	Did not enter							Did not enter					
(Canada) 1998	Did not enter							Did not enter					
(United States) 2000	Did not enter							Did not enter					
(United States) (Canada) 2002	Did not enter							Did not enter					
(United States) 2006	Did not qualify							2	0	0	2	1	3
(Mexico) 2010	Did not enter							Did not enter					
(United States) 2014	Did not qualify							2014 Caribbean Cup					
(United States) 2018	Did not enter							Did not enter					
(Mexico) 2022	Did not qualify							4	1	0	3	2	19
(United States) 2026	Did not qualify							4	0	0	4	1	41
Total	0/12	-	-	-	-	-	-	10	1	0	6	4	63

*Draws include knockout matches decided on penalty kicks.

=== CONCACAF W Gold Cup ===
CONCACAF W Gold Cup record								Qualification record							
Year	Result	GP	W	D*	L	GF	GA	Division	Group	GP	W	D*	L	GF	GA
(United States) 2024	Did not qualify							C	D	4	0	1	3	4	13
(N/A) 2029	To be determined							To be determined							
Total	–	–	–	–	–	–	–	–	–	4	0	1	3	4	13

*Draws include knockout matches decided on penalty kicks.

=== CFU Women's Caribbean Cup ===
CFU Women's Caribbean Cup record
Year	Result	Pld	W	D*	L	GF	GA
(Haiti) 2000	Preliminary	2	0	0	2	0	12
(Trinidad and Tobago) 2014	First round	3	1	1	1	5	7
2018	Did not enter						
Total	–	5	1	1	3	5	19

*Draws include knockout matches decided on penalty kicks.
