= Donna-Kay Henry =

Jamaican footballer (born 1990)

Personal information
- Date of birth: November 10, 1990 (age 36)
- Place of birth: Kingston, Jamaica
- Height: 1.65 m (5 ft 5 in)
- Positions: Forward; winger

College career
Years	Team	Apps	(Gls)
2008–2011	Chattanooga Mocs	69	(31)

Senior career*
Years	Team	Apps	(Gls)
2012	Western New York Flash		
2014	FC Neunkirch	8	(5)
2015	UMF Selfoss	17	(9)
2016–2017	Stjarnan	26	(6)

International career^{‡}
2014–	Jamaica	9	(9)
- * Club domestic league appearances and goals ‡ National team caps and goals as of 16 March 2015

Donna-Kay Henry (born 10 November 1990) is an American-raised Jamaican footballer who plays as a midfielder. She was a member of the Jamaica women's national team.

== Early life ==
Henry was born in Kingston, Jamaica and moved to Queens, New York when she was nine years old.

== College career ==
Henry attended the University of Tennessee at Chattanooga on a full athletic scholarship.

== Club career ==
Henry scored in the Icelandic Women's Cup final in 2015 for UMF Selfoss.

== International goals ==
Scores and results list Jamaica's goal tally first

No.	Date	Venue	Opponent	Score	Result	Competition
1	16 October 2014	Sporting Park, Kansas City, United States	Martinique	3–0	6–0	2014 CONCACAF Women's Championship
2	16 October 2014	Sporting Park, Kansas City, United States	Martinique	6–0	6–0	2014 CONCACAF Women's Championship
3	21 October 2014	RFK Stadium, Washington, United States	Mexico	1–0	1–3	2014 CONCACAF Women's Championship
