= Kencia Marseille =

Haitian footballer (born 1980)

Personal information
- Full name: Kencia Marseille
- Date of birth: 8 November 1980 (age 45)
- Place of birth: Haiti
- Position: Defender

International career^{‡}
Years	Team	Apps	(Gls)
2002–	Haiti	19	(1)
- ‡ National team caps and goals as of 20 March 2015

Kencia Marseille (born 8 November 1980) is a Haitian women's association football player who plays as a defender.
