= Samantha Brand =

Haitian footballer (born 1988)

Personal information
- Full name: Samantha Marie-Ann Brand
- Date of birth: 16 June 1988 (age 38)
- Place of birth: San Bernardino County, California, United States
- Height: 5 ft 2 in (1.57 m)
- Position: Midfielder

College career
Years	Team	Apps	(Gls)
2006–2009	San Francisco Dons		

Senior career*
Years	Team	Apps	(Gls)
2010	UMF Afturelding	6	(0)
2011	IFK Gävle	9	(3)
2015	Tierps IF	22	(1)
2017–2018	Ljusdals IF	22	(11)

International career^{‡}
2010–	Haiti	14	(1)
- * Club domestic league appearances and goals as of 12:59, 20 March 2015 (UTC) ‡ National team caps and goals as of 12:59, 20 March 2015 (UTC)

Samantha Marie-Ann Brand (born 16 June 1988) is an American-born Haitian footballer who plays as a midfielder. She was a member of the Haiti women's national team.
