= Alexa Allen =

Jamaican football forward (born 1994)

Personal information
- Full name: Alexa Tiffany Allen
- Date of birth: April 22, 1994 (age 32)
- Place of birth: Buford, Georgia, United States
- Height: 5 ft 8 in (1.73 m)
- Position: Forward

College career
Years	Team	Apps	(Gls)
2012–2013	Auburn		
2014–2015	NC State		

International career^{‡}
2014–	Jamaica	7	(4)
- ‡ National team caps and goals as of March 16, 2015

Alexa Allen is a Jamaican international football forward.
