= Marie Yves Dina Jean Pierre =

Haitian footballer (born 1990)

Personal information
- Full name: Marie Yves Dina Jean Pierre
- Date of birth: 14 January 1990 (age 36)
- Place of birth: Haiti
- Position: Defender

International career^{‡}
Years	Team	Apps	(Gls)
2010–	Haiti	10	(0)
- ‡ National team caps and goals as of 13:18, 20 March 2015 (UTC)

Marie Yves Dina Jean Pierre (born 14 January 1990) is a Haitian women's association football player who plays as a defender.
