= Jodi-Ann McGregor =

Jamaican footballer

Personal information
- Full name: Jodi-Ann McGregor
- Place of birth: Jamaica
- Position: Midfielder

International career^{‡}
Years	Team	Apps	(Gls)
2014–	Jamaica	3	(0)
- ‡ National team caps and goals as of 21:56, 16 March 2015 (UTC)

Jodi-Ann McGregor is a Jamaican international football midfielder.
