= Nicole Campbell-Green =

Jamaican footballer

Personal information
- Full name: Nicole Campbell-Green
- Date of birth: 31 January 1991 (age 35)
- Place of birth: Jamaica
- Position: Midfielder

International career^{‡}
Years	Team	Apps	(Gls)
2014–	Jamaica	2	(0)
- ‡ National team caps and goals as of 21:54, 16 March 2015 (UTC)

Nicole Campbell-Green (born 31 January 1991) is a Jamaican international football midfielder.
