= Wisline Dolce =

Haitian footballer (born 1986)

Personal information
- Date of birth: 22 November 1986 (age 39)
- Place of birth: Haiti
- Position: Midfielder

Senior career*
Years	Team	Apps	(Gls)
- Tigresses

International career^{‡}
2006–2015	Haiti	22	(6)
- * Club domestic league appearances and goals ‡ National team caps and goals as of 20 March 2015

Wisline Dolce (born 22 November 1986) is a Haitian former footballer who played as a midfielder. She has been a member of the Haiti women's national team.

== Club career ==
Dolce has played for AS Tigresses in Haiti.
