= Alicia Wilson (footballer) =

Jamaican footballer (born 1979)

Personal information
- Full name: Alicia Maxine Wilson
- Date of birth: 19 December 1979 (age 46)
- Place of birth: Jamaica
- Height: 1.68 m (5 ft 6 in)
- Position: Defender

College career
Years	Team	Apps	(Gls)
2000–2003	William Carey Crusaders		

Senior career*
Years	Team	Apps	(Gls)
2004	Asheville Splash		
2005	New Jersey Wildcats		
2006–2007	KR	25	(2)
2008–2010	Dimas Escazú		
2010	KR	10	(0)
2011–2012	Dimas Escazú		

International career^{‡}
1999–2014	Jamaica	60	(6)

Managerial career
- 2013–2014: West Florida (assistant)
- 2015–2024: Navarro College
- 2025–: Alabama State
- * Club domestic league appearances and goals as of 21:48, 16 March 2015 (UTC) ‡ National team caps and goals as of 21:49, 16 March 2015 (UTC)

Alicia Maxine Wilson (born 19 December 1979) is a Jamaican former footballer who played as a defender. She is the head coach at Alabama State in Montgomery, Alabama.

== Early life ==
Wilson was raised in Montego Bay.

== Club career ==
Wilson has played in Costa Rica for Dimas Escazú.

== Honours ==
KR

Winner

- Selected twice in the best 11
- League Cup Women C:2007
- W-League Champion NJ Wildcats 2005
- W-League player of the week Twice in 2004
- All Region/All GCAC Conference First Team- Region 13 NAIA [2004, 2003, 2002, 2000]
- Player of the Year Region 13/ GCAC Conference NAIA 2001
- All American NAIA 2001, Honorable Mention- 2000, 2002, 2003!

== Personal life ==
Wilson met her Costa Rican husband, Óscar López, in North Carolina. The couple moved to Costa Rica, where daughter Kiana López, who represented Costa Rica at the 2025 FIFA U-17 Women's World Cup, was born.
