= Darton State College =

Public college in Albany, Georgia, US

Coordinates: 31°35′2″N 84°12′40″W

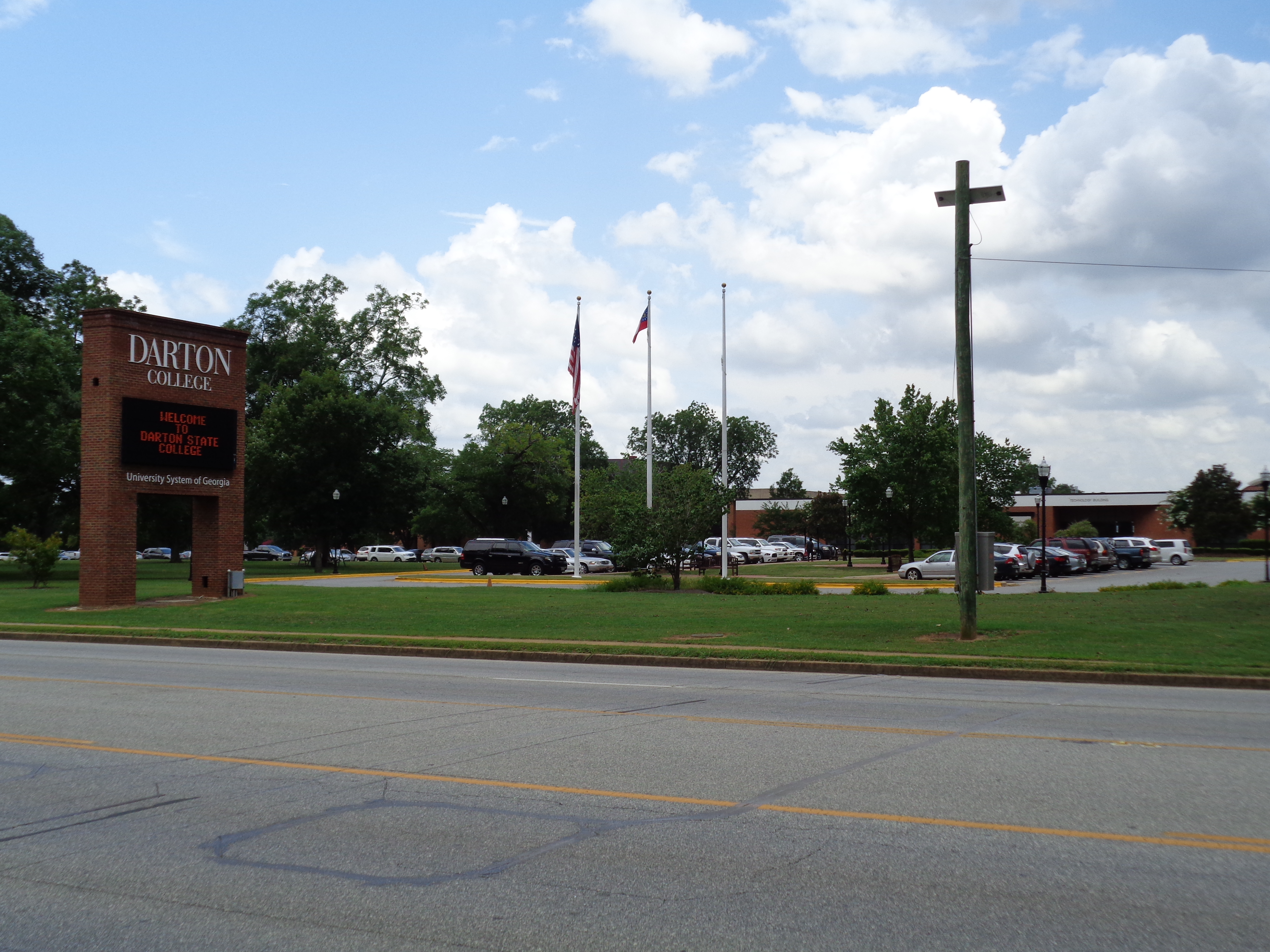
- Motto: A Better Beginning
- Type: Public college
- Active: 1963–2016
- Administrative staff: 235 (est.)
- Students: 5,419
- Location: Albany, Georgia, U.S.
- Campus: Urban, 186.1 acres (75.3 ha)
- Colors: Red and black
- Nickname: Cavaliers
- Website: web.archive.org/web/20161119043017/http://www.darton.edu (archived version)

Darton State College was a public college in Albany, Georgia. It was part of the University System of Georgia and had its highest enrollment, 6,097 students, in 2011. Prior to its merger with Albany State University in 2016, the college offered 84 two-year transfer and career associate degrees, 4 four-year baccalaureate degrees, and 49 certificate programs.

== History ==
The institution was founded as Albany Junior College in 1963 and offered its first classes in 1966.

In 1987, a committee of faculty, staff, students and community members chose the name Darton College as part of its reclassification as a state college. "Darton" is an Old English word probably meaning "town by the (River) Dearne," as evidenced in the British village of that name; it refers to Albany's location on the Flint River.

In November 2015, the Board of Regents of the University System of Georgia announced the consolidation of Albany State University and Darton State College, appointing Dr. Arthur Dunning as President of the university. The new combined institutions assumed the name and branding of Albany State University. The Darton campus became Albany State University West Campus and the location of the university's Darton College of Health Professions.

The merger of the two institutions greatly decreased the combined enrollment. Fall 2013 enrollments were 6,195 for Darton State College and 4,260 for Albany State University, while Fall 2017 enrollments for the new combined Albany State University were 6,615. This represents a 27% decrease over that period.

== Campus ==
The 186 acre campus on Albany's western edge included a 470-seat theater, library, fitness center, computer labs, and sports facilities such as tennis and racquetball courts, indoor swimming pool, indoor bowling alley and climbing wall, with surrounding nature trails, soccer fields, ball fields, and pecan trees.

== Student population ==
At one time, Darton College enrolled more than half of the area's high school graduates and approximately 45% of the students were from Dougherty County. (The population of the MSA was 162,800 in 2004.) Approximately 1% of students were from out-of-state and about 100 were from other countries.

About 57% of Darton's students were under age 24. Approximately 45% were non-Hispanic black, and 50% were non-Hispanic white — no other group constituted more than 3% (self-reported).

Full-time enrollment was approximately 47%.

In August, 2013, President Sireno stated that "Darton State College has seen a 90.5 percent enrollment increase over the past decade."

== Academics ==
Darton State College provided educational opportunities and services to Southwest Georgia with a variety of programs, including three bachelors of science and one bachelor of arts degree, four associate degrees, 10 career associate degrees and 15 certificates. Darton prepared students to enter the workforce or continue their education at another four-year institution. Darton State College was a public institution as part of the University System of Georgia and was accredited by the Southern Association of Colleges and Schools.

=== Distance learning ===
To increase access to a college education, grants enabled Darton to offer 39 fully online degrees, 10 partially online degrees, 13 fully online certificate programs, and over 96 individual distance learning courses over the Internet, through local Channel 19 telecasts, GVNS video-conferencing, and at sites off the main campus: Cordele, Thomasville, Colquitt, Rome, Barnesville, Columbus, Valdosta, Waycross, Sandersville, Swainsboro, and Atlanta, Georgia. Darton College had a strong presence in state distance learning initiatives, with its core curriculum courses in many programs available online.

=== Nursing Division ===
Darton's Nursing Division provided education for many of Southwest Georgia's nurses — including 70% of all Registered Nurses (RNs) in Albany hospitals and 30% of all RNs in 38 southwest Georgia counties. As of spring 2005, the college had awarded 2,259 nursing degrees. In 2009, there were 177 graduates from the nursing program and 25 faculty members.

The division had satellite programs in Cordele, Sandersville, Swainsboro and Thomasville. Darton College received a $2.48 million grant from the U.S. Department of Labor in 2005 to develop an online nursing program. In 2010, a new 25,800 square foot Nursing Building opened on the main campus in Albany.

The five-semester nursing program led to an Associate of Science in Nursing degree and eligibility to take registered nurse licensure exams. In May 2011, the Board of Regents of the University System of Georgia approved Darton's change to State College status so that a four-year program leading to a Bachelor of Science in Nursing could be developed. The program was intended for RNs with an associate degree in Nursing. Darton offered the program beginning in fall 2013.

The nursing program was accredited by the NLNAC.

== Instructional technology ==
Darton was a leader in educational technology use. It was named a “Most-Wired Campus” by Yahoo and a “Leader in Digital Technology” by the American Association of Community Colleges. In addition to its huge variety of online course offerings, Darton used technologies such as Wimba Classroom, streaming media, and motion capture technology.

== Extracurricular activities ==
Extracurricular activities included groups such as the Cultural Exchange Club, Book Talk and the Darton Association of Nursing Students, as well as intramural athletics, pecan picking, league tournament athletics, community service associations and honor societies.

== Sports ==
Students were able to participate in an array of Georgia Junior College Athletic Association/National Junior College Athletic Association intercollegiate athletics, including women's soccer, golf, women's softball and basketball, and men's baseball.

Darton received the 2005–06 Trophy Cup from the GJCAA for having the top two-year athletic program in the state. Four of the college's teams went to nationals in 2006. The Men's Golf Team won the NJCAA National Championship for the second year in a row in 2006. Darton College men's golf team won the national title in 2005, 2006, 2007 and came runners up in 2008. The women's soccer team were national runners-up in 2005 and were later ranked highly in the NJCAA.

Darton's men and women swimming programs placed third overall at the 2007 NJCAA National Championships with virtually every member on the competing roster securing All-American Honors. In addition, two of the swimmers won their events, making them national champions.

Darton College women's soccer team went all the way to the NJCAA National Championship game again in 2008 but lost 3–2. They finished ranked second in the nation with a 23-1-1 record.

Darton College Men's XC team final time winning the GCAA Cross Country Championship back on October 25, 2014, was a year to remember. Not only did the Men's XC team win the Championship but David Thornton won the (Eight Kilometer) meet and also broke the school record with a winning time of 25 minutes and 38 seconds. The previous record was 26:04.(2012)
