= Saint Lucia women's national football team =

Women's national association football team representing Saint Lucia

Saint Lucia
- Association: Saint Lucia Football Association
- Confederation: CONCACAF
- Head coach: (Saint Lucia) Emmanuel Bellas
- Top scorer: Ellaisa Marquis
- FIFA code: LCA
First colours	Second colours

FIFA ranking
- Current: 164 ▲1 (16 June 2026)
- Highest: 90 (July 2003)
- Lowest: 159 (December 2025)

First international
- British Virgin Islands 0–8 Saint Lucia (Tortola, British Virgin Islands; 21 May 2000)

Biggest win
- Saint Lucia 13–0 British Virgin Islands (Castries, Saint Lucia; 28 May 2000)

Biggest defeat
- Jamaica 14–0 Saint Lucia (San Cristóbal, Dominican Republic; 20 June 2014)

The Saint Lucia women's national football team is the national women's football team of Saint Lucia and is overseen by the Saint Lucia Football Association.

== Results and fixtures ==
The following is a list of match results in the last 12 months, as well as any future matches that have been scheduled.

Legend

Win Draw Lose Fixture

=== 2025 ===
1 December 2025 2026 CONCACAF W Championship Q	Puerto Rico	7–0	Saint Lucia	Bayamón
19:30 UTC−4	Aguilera 4', 39', 74', 78'; Marcano 12'; De Jesus 18'; C. Torres 64'	Report (FIFA); Report (CONCACAF)		Stadium: Estadio Juan Ramón Loubriel; Referee: Odette Hamilton (Jamaica)

27 November 2025 2026 CONCACAF W Championship Q	U.S. Virgin Islands	3–1	Saint Lucia	Kingshill
16:00 UTC−4	Vialva 10'; Frost 32'; Hood 49'	Report (FIFA); Report (CONCACAF)	St. Louis 44'	Stadium: Bethlehem Soccer Complex; Referee: Carly Shaw-MacLaren (Canada)

== Coaching staff ==
As September 2023 Trevor Anderson (Entraîneur-chef), Hiram Hunte (Entraineur-assistant), Mary Campbell (Chef d'équipe), Ces Podd (Directeur technique), Bernard Président (Entraîneur de gardien de but), Wade Clovis (Entraînement physique), Natasha Innocent (Docteur).

=== Manager history ===
- (Saint Lucia) Sean Kirton (20??–20??)
- (Saint Lucia) Emmanuel Bellas (2021–??)
- Trevor Flecky Anderson(???-present)

== Team ==
=== Current squad ===
- The following players were named to the squad for the 2026 CONCACAF W Championship qualification matches against the USVI on 27 November 2025 and Puerto Rico on 1 December 2025.

No.	Pos.	Player	Date of birth (age)	Club
1	GK	Renala Francis	21 July 2003 (age 23)	(Saint Lucia Football Association)
16	GK	Kenna Lionel	8 August 1998 (age 28)	(Saint Lucia Football Association) Vieux Fort South
	DF	Steffany Allain	23 November 1991 (age 34)	(Saint Lucia Football Association)
	DF	Jasmine Auguste Ryan	4 October 1993 (age 33)	(Saint Lucia Football Association)
	DF	Sabrina Avril		(Saint Lucia Football Association)
	DF	Shania Charles		(Saint Lucia Football Association)
6	DF	Racquel John (c)	4 April 1997 (age 29)	(United States Soccer Federation) CCC Tigers
	DF	Hayla Samuel		(Saint Lucia Football Association)
	DF	Jessica Wallace		(The Football Association) Shrewsbury Town
	DF	Melanie Richard		(Saint Lucia Football Association)
	DF	Yana St. Hilaire		(Saint Lucia Football Association)
8	MF	Ellaisa Marquis	1 February 1991 (age 35)	(Saint Lucia Football Association) Dennery
	MF	Tori Fanus		(Saint Lucia Football Association)
	MF	Ambrosier Mitchell		(Saint Lucia Football Association)
	MF	Harmanie Jones		(Saint Lucia Football Association)
	MF	Kyla Lionel		(Saint Lucia Football Association)
	FW	Shamalyn Albert		(Saint Lucia Football Association)
	FW	Arnicka Louis	28 January 2005 (age 21)	(United States Soccer Federation) Indian Hills Warriors
	FW	Britney Moncherry		(United States Soccer Federation) NTCC Eagles
	FW	Kayla Polius		(Saint Lucia Football Association)
	FW	Kirsheena Ince		(United States Soccer Federation) NTCC Eagles
	FW	Krysan St. Louis (vc)		(United States Soccer Federation) TAMIU Dustdevils

=== Recent call ups ===
Pos.	Player	Date of birth (age)	Caps	Goals	Club	Latest call-up

=== Recent call-ups ===
The following players have also been called up to the squad in last 12 months.

== Competitive record ==
=== FIFA Women's World Cup ===
FIFA Women's World Cup record
Year	Result	GP	W	D*	L	GF	GA	GD
(China) 1991	Did not enter							
(Sweden) 1995	Did not enter							
(United States) 1999	Did not enter							
(United States) 2003	Did not qualify							
(China) 2007	Did not qualify							
(Germany) 2011	Did not qualify							
(Canada) 2015	Did not qualify							
(France) 2019	Did not qualify							
(Australia) (New Zealand) 2023	Did not enter							
(Brazil) 2027	Did not qualify							
(Costa Rica) (Jamaica) (Mexico) (United States) 2031	To be determined							
(United Kingdom) 2035	To be determined							
Total	0/10	-	-	-	-	-	-	-

*Draws include knockout matches decided on penalty kicks.

=== Olympic Games ===
Summer Olympics record									Qualifying record					
Year	Round	Position	Pld	W	D*	L	GF	GA	Pld	W	D*	L	GF	GA
(United States) 1996	Did not enter													
(Australia) 2000	Did not enter													
(Greece) 2004	Did not enter													
(China) 2008	Did not enter													
(United Kingdom) 2012	Did not enter													
(Brazil) 2016	Did not qualify								2	0	0	2	1	14
(Japan) 2020	Did not qualify								4	1	0	3	7	12
(France) 2024	Did not enter								2022 CONCACAF W Championship					
(United States) 2028	Did not qualify								2026 CONCACAF W Championship					
Total	0/8	-	-	-	-	-	-	-	6	1	0	5	8	26

=== CONCACAF W Championship ===
CONCACAF W Championship record								Qualification record					
Year	Result	GP	W	D*	L	GF	GA	GP	W	D*	L	GF	GA
(Haiti) 1991	Did not enter												
(United States) 1993	Did not enter												
(Canada) 1994	Did not enter												
(Canada) 1998	Did not enter												
(United States) 2000	Did not enter												
(United States) (Canada) 2002	Did not qualify							3	1	1	1	1	9
(United States) 2006	Did not qualify							3	2	0	1	5	8
(Mexico) 2010	Did not qualify							5	2	0	3	13	19
(United States) 2014	Did not qualify							2014 Caribbean Cup					
(United States) 2018	Did not qualify							3	2	0	1	4	3
(Mexico) 2022	Did not enter							Did not enter					
(United States) 2026	Did not qualify							4	0	0	4	1	18
Total	0/12	-	-	-	-	-	-	18	7	1	10	24	57

*Draws include knockout matches decided on penalty kicks.

=== CONCACAF W Gold Cup ===
CONCACAF W Gold Cup record								Qualification record							
Year	Result	GP	W	D*	L	GF	GA	Division	Group	GP	W	D*	L	GF	GA
(United States) 2024	Did not qualify							C	B	4	2	0	2	12	8
(N/A) 2029	To be determined							To be determined							
Total	–	–	–	–	–	–	–	–	–	4	2	0	2	12	8

*Draws include knockout matches decided on penalty kicks.

=== CFU Women's Caribbean Cup ===
CFU Women's Caribbean Cup record
Year	Result	Pld	W	D*	L	GF	GA
(Haiti) 2000	Runners up	3	1	1	1	8	6
(Trinidad and Tobago) 2014	First round	2	0	0	2	0	21
(Saint Kitts and Nevis) 2018	N/A	3	2	1	0	2	0
Total	–	8	3	2	3	10	27

*Draws include knockout matches decided on penalty kicks.

== Honours ==
=== Regional ===
- CFU Women's Caribbean Cup

Runners-up (1): 2000

== See also ==
- Sport in Saint Lucia
  - Football in Saint Lucia
    - Women's football in Saint Lucia
- Saint Lucia men's national football team
