= Martinique women's national football team =

National association football team

Martinique
- Nickname: Les Matinino
- Association: Ligue de football de la Martinique
- Confederation: CONCACAF (North America)
- Head coach: Jean-Marc Civault
- Home stadium: Stade d'Honneur de Dillon
- FIFA code: MTQ
First colours	Second colours

First international
- Martinique 1–1 Trinidad and Tobago (Port-au-Prince, Haiti; 18 April 1991)

Biggest win
- Puerto Rico 0–9 Martinique (Canada; 1 September 1998)

Biggest defeat
- Canada 14–0 Martinique (Toronto, Canada; 30 August 1998)

CONCACAF Women's Championship
- Appearances: 3 (first in 1991)
- Best result: Group stage (1991, 1998, 2014)

The Martinique women's national football team (French: Équipe de la Martinique de football) represents the French internationally and region of Martinique in international football. The team is controlled by the Ligue de football de la Martinique (English: Martinique Football League), a local branch of French Football Federation (French: Fédération Française de Football).

As an overseas department of the French Republic, Martinique is not a member of FIFA and is therefore not eligible to enter the FIFA Women's World Cup or any competition organized first-hand by the organization. Martiniquais, being French citizens, are eligible to play for the France women's national football team. Martinique is, however, a member of CONCACAF and CFU and is eligible for all competitions organized by both organizations. According to the status of the FFF (article 34, paragraph 6): "[...]Under the control of related continental confederations, and with the agreement of the FFF, those leagues can organize international sport events at a regional level or set up teams in order to participate to them." A special rule of the CONCACAF Gold Cup only allows players to join the team if they have not played for France during the past five years. On the other side, any player joining Martinique is allowed to join the France national team after-wards without any time limit.

== Competitive record ==
=== CONCACAF W Championship record ===
CONCACAF W Championship record									Qualification record					
Year	Result	GP	W	D*	L	GF	GA	GD	GP	W	D*	L	GF	GA
(Haiti) 1991	Group Stage	3	0	1	2	2	21	−19	N/A					
(United States) 1993	Did not enter								Did not enter					
(Canada) 1994	Did not enter								Did not enter					
(Canada) 1998	Group Stage	3	1	0	2	9	16	−7	Bye					
(United States) 2000	Did not enter								Did not enter					
(United States) (Canada) 2002	Did not enter								Did not enter					
(United States) 2006	Did not enter								Did not enter					
(Mexico) 2010	Did not enter								Did not enter					
(United States) 2014	Group Stage	3	0	0	3	1	22	−21	2014 Caribbean Cup					
(United States) 2018	Did not qualify								3	1	0	2	3	5
(Mexico) 2022	Did not enter								Did not enter					
(United States) 2026	Did not enter								Did not enter					
Total	3/12	9	1	1	7	12	59	–47	3	1	0	2	3	5

*Draws include knockout matches decided on penalty kicks.

=== CONCACAF W Gold Cup ===
CONCACAF W Gold Cup record								Qualification record							
Year	Result	GP	W	D*	L	GF	GA	Division	Group	GP	W	D*	L	GF	GA
(United States) 2024	Did not qualify							B	B	6	2	1	3	7	15
(N/A) 2029	To be determined							To be determined							
Total	–	–	–	–	–	–	–	–	–	6	2	1	3	7	15

*Draws include knockout matches decided on penalty kicks.

=== CFU Women's Caribbean Cup ===
CFU Women's Caribbean Cup record
Year	Result	Pld	W	D*	L	GF	GA
(Haiti) 2000	Withdrew	2	1	0	1	5	3
(Trinidad and Tobago) 2014	Fourth Place	6	3	1	2	8	14
2018	Withdrew						
Total	–	8	4	1	3	13	17

*Draws include knockout matches decided on penalty kicks.

== Results and fixtures ==
The following is a list of match results in the last 12 months, as well as any future matches that have been scheduled.

Legend

Win Draw Lose Fixture

== Coaching staff ==
=== Current coaching staff ===
Role	Name	Ref.
Head coach	Jean-Marc Civault	

== Current squad ==
- The following players were called up for the match against El Salvador for the 2024 CONCACAF W Gold Cup qualification on 29 November 2023.

No.	Pos.	Player	Date of birth (age)	Caps	Club
1	GK	Emmeline Mainguy	12 June 1988 (age 38)		(France) SM Caen
23	GK	Mirella Rene-corail	13 March 1994 (age 32)		(Martinique) RC Rivière-Pilote
3	DF	Ambre Allebe Allet	26 October 2002 (age 23)		(France) US Quevilly
22	DF	Kevina Defrel			(Martinique) Club Franciscain
2	DF	Dorialina Dijon	9 February 1998 (age 28)		(France) US Azzurri Mulhouse
19	DF	Elodie Dinglor	2 August 1997 (age 29)		(France) US Saint-Malo
	DF	Sephora Certain			(France) SO Châtellerault
4	DF	Laurène Tresfield	18 September 1995 (age 31)		(Spain) Deportivo Alavés
	DF	Melissandre Heurlie	8 December 2007 (age 18)		(Martinique) Club Franciscain
7	MF	Eve Hieu	7 February 1990 (age 36)		(Martinique) RC Rivière-Pilote
	MF	Prisca Carin	1 December 1989 (age 36)		(Martinique) Club Franciscain
18	MF	Aurelie Rouge	25 May 1992 (age 34)		(Martinique) RC Rivière-Pilote
11	MF	Maeva Jacques	18 October 1992 (age 34)		(Martinique) Club Franciscain
21	MF	Maelys Bertholo	30 March 2005 (age 21)		(Luxembourg) FC Mamer 32
	MF	Rejeane Civault	10 October 2003 (age 23)		(Martinique) ASC Emulation
	MF	Naya Péria			(Martinique) Club Colonial
	MF	Naomie Bellance-Lapointe	14 June 2001 (age 25)		(France) Bourg-en-Bresse Péronnas
8	FW	Ludmila Gaydu	18 March 2003 (age 23)		(Martinique) ASC Emulation
16	FW	Jessica Jacques	18 October 1992 (age 34)		(Martinique) Club Franciscain
20	FW	Seina Clavos	9 August 2003 (age 23)		(Martinique) Club Franciscain
6	FW	Mylaine Tarrieu	3 January 1995 (age 31)		(France) Bordeaux
	FW	Czeslawa Mavroudis	21 January 1994 (age 32)		(Martinique) Club Franciscain

=== Recent call ups ===
Pos.	Player	Date of birth (age)	Caps	Goals	Club	Latest call-up
