= 2018 CONCACAF Women's Championship squads =

The 2018 CONCACAF Women's Championship was an international women's football tournament held in the United States from 4–17 October 2018. The eight national teams involved in the tournament were required to register a squad of 20 players, including two goalkeepers. Only players in these squads were eligible to take part in the tournament.

The provisional 35-player squad lists were announced on 10 September 2018. From the preliminary squad, the final list of 20 players per national team was submitted to CONCACAF 24 hours before each team's first match.

The final 20-player roster (2 must be goalkeepers) for each team was announced by CONCACAF on 26 September 2018. Following this, only injury-related replacements were permitted.

The position listed for each player is per the official squad list published by CONCACAF. The age listed for each player is on 4 October 2018, the first day of the tournament. The numbers of caps and goals listed for each player do not include any matches played after the start of tournament. The nationality for each club reflects the national association (not the league) to which the club is affiliated.

== Group A ==
=== Mexico ===
Coach: Roberto Medina

No.	Pos.	Player	Date of birth (age)	Caps	Goals	Club
1	GK	Cecilia Santiago	19 October 1994 (aged 23)	52	0	(Mexican Football Federation) América
2	DF	Kenti Robles	15 February 1991 (aged 27)	54	3	(Royal Spanish Football Federation) Atlético Madrid
3	DF	Christina Murillo	28 January 1993 (aged 25)	37	1	(United States Soccer Federation) Chicago Red Stars
4	DF	Bianca Sierra	25 June 1992 (aged 26)	39	0	(Football Association of Iceland) Þór/KA
5	DF	Mónica Flores	31 January 1996 (aged 22)	7	0	(Royal Spanish Football Federation) Valencia
6	MF	Nancy Antonio	2 April 1996 (aged 22)	8	1	(Mexican Football Federation) UANL
7	MF	Nayeli Rangel	28 February 1992 (aged 26)	79	7	(Mexican Football Federation) UANL
8	MF	Karla Nieto	9 January 1995 (aged 23)	13	0	(Mexican Football Federation) Pachuca
9	FW	Charlyn Corral	11 September 1991 (aged 27)	42	22	(Royal Spanish Football Federation) Levante
10	MF	Stephany Mayor	23 September 1991 (aged 27)	63	11	(Football Association of Iceland) Þór/KA
11	MF	Mónica Ocampo	4 January 1987 (aged 31)	85	17	(Mexican Football Federation) Pachuca
12	GK	Bianca Henninger	22 October 1990 (aged 27)	6	0	(United States Soccer Federation) Houston Dash
13	DF	Rebeca Bernal	31 August 1997 (aged 21)	6	0	(Mexican Football Federation) Monterrey
14	DF	Arianna Romero	29 July 1992 (aged 26)	34	1	(Football Association of Iceland) Valur
15	FW	Ariana Calderón	12 May 1990 (aged 28)	14	2	(Football Association of Iceland) Þór/KA
16	MF	Cristina Ferral	16 February 1993 (aged 25)	9	1	(Mexican Football Federation) UANL
17	MF	María Sánchez	20 February 1996 (aged 22)	11	2	(United States Soccer Federation) Santa Clara Broncos
18	FW	Kiana Palacios	1 October 1996 (aged 22)	4	1	(Royal Spanish Football Federation) Real Sociedad
19	FW	Katie Johnson	14 September 1994 (aged 24)	18	7	(United States Soccer Federation) Sky Blue FC
20	MF	Lizbeth Ovalle	19 October 1999 (aged 18)	1	0	(Mexican Football Federation) UANL

=== Panama ===
Coach: (Argentina) Víctor Suárez

No.	Pos.	Player	Date of birth (age)	Caps	Goals	Club
1	GK	Yenith Bailey	29 March 2001 (aged 17)			(Panamanian Football Federation) Sporting San Miguelito
2	DF	Hilary Jaén	29 August 2002 (aged 16)			(Panamanian Football Federation) Atlético Nacional
3	DF	María Murillo	15 December 1996 (aged 21)			(Panamanian Football Federation) Atlético Nacional
4	MF	Katherine Castillo	23 March 1996 (aged 22)			(Panamanian Football Federation) Atlético Nacional
5	DF	Yomira Pinzón	23 August 1996 (aged 22)			(Panamanian Football Federation) Atlético Nacional
6	MF	Aldrith Quintero	1 January 2002 (aged 16)			(Panamanian Football Federation) Tauro FC
7	MF	Kenia Rangel	6 August 1995 (aged 23)			(Panamanian Football Federation) Atlético Nacional
8	MF	Laurie Batista	29 May 1996 (aged 22)			(Panamanian Football Federation) CD Universitario
9	FW	Karla Riley	18 September 1997 (aged 21)			(Panamanian Football Federation) Sporting San Miguelito
10	MF	Marta Cox	20 July 1997 (aged 21)			(Panamanian Football Federation) CD Universitario
11	FW	Natalia Mills	22 March 1993 (aged 25)			(Panamanian Football Federation) Atlético Nacional
12	GK	Farissa Córdoba	30 June 1989 (aged 29)			(Panamanian Football Federation) CD Universitario
13	DF	Onelys Alvarado	20 August 1993 (aged 25)			(Panamanian Football Federation) San Francisco FC
14	DF	Maryorie Pérez	25 November 1997 (aged 20)			(Panamanian Football Federation) CD Universitario
15	DF	Rebeca Espinosa	5 July 1992 (aged 26)			Unattached
16	DF	Sheyla Díaz	9 August 2005 (aged 13)			(Panamanian Football Federation) Atlético Nacional
17	FW	Anuvis Angulo	3 May 2001 (aged 17)			(Panamanian Football Federation) Atlético Nacional
18	FW	Erika Hernández	17 March 1999 (aged 19)			(Panamanian Football Federation) CD Universitario
19	FW	Lineth Cedeño	5 December 2000 (aged 17)			(Panamanian Football Federation) Tauro FC
20	DF	María Montenegro	17 September 2000 (aged 18)			(Panamanian Football Federation) Atlético Nacional

=== Trinidad and Tobago ===
Coach: Shawn Cooper

No.	Pos.	Player	Date of birth (age)	Caps	Goals	Club
1	GK	Kimika Forbes	28 August 1990 (aged 28)			(Colombian Football Federation) Santa Fe
2	DF	Ayana Russell	16 March 1988 (aged 30)			(Trinidad and Tobago Football Association) QPCC Football
3	FW	Mariah Shade	9 December 1991 (aged 26)			(Trinidad and Tobago Football Association) Petrotrin
4	DF	Rhea Belgrave	19 July 1991 (aged 27)			(Trinidad and Tobago Football Association) Real Dimension WFC
5	DF	Arin King	8 February 1991 (aged 27)			Unattached
6	FW	Natasha St. Louis	1 November 1991 (aged 26)			(Trinidad and Tobago Football Association) St. Ann's Rangers
7	DF	Jonelle Cato	14 March 1995 (aged 23)			(Trinidad and Tobago Football Association) Trincity Nationals
8	DF	Patrice Superville	8 April 1987 (aged 31)			(Trinidad and Tobago Football Association) QPCC Football
9	DF	Liana Hinds	23 February 1995 (aged 23)			Unattached
10	FW	Tasha St. Louis	20 December 1985 (aged 32)			(Trinidad and Tobago Football Association) Real Dimension WFC
11	MF	Janine François	1 January 1989 (aged 29)			(Trinidad and Tobago Football Association) Real Dimension WFC
12	MF	Kayla Taylor	29 October 1994 (aged 23)			(Trinidad and Tobago Football Association) Petrotrin
13	DF	Jenelle Cunningham	29 April 1990 (aged 28)			(Trinidad and Tobago Football Association) Real Dimension WFC
14	MF	Karyn Forbes	27 August 1991 (aged 27)			(Trinidad and Tobago Football Association) Real Dimension WFC
15	MF	Shenelle Henry	13 March 1994 (aged 24)			Unattached
16	DF	Cecily Stoute	26 October 1999 (aged 18)			(United States Soccer Federation) Georgia Lady Bulldogs
17	DF	Lauryn Hutchinson	12 June 1991 (aged 27)			Unattached
18	MF	Naomie Guerra	1 June 1996 (aged 22)			(Trinidad and Tobago Football Association) St. Augustine FC
19	FW	Kennya Cordner	11 November 1988 (aged 29)			(Norwegian Football Federation) IL Sandviken
20	GK	Saundra Baron	20 July 1994 (aged 24)			Unattached

=== United States ===
Coach: Jill Ellis

No.	Pos.	Player	Date of birth (age)	Caps	Goals	Club
1	GK	Alyssa Naeher	20 April 1988 (aged 30)	33	0	(United States Soccer Federation) Chicago Red Stars
2	DF	Emily Sonnett	25 November 1993 (aged 24)	21	0	(United States Soccer Federation) Portland Thorns FC
3	MF	Sam Mewis	9 October 1992 (aged 25)	38	7	(United States Soccer Federation) North Carolina Courage
4	DF	Becky Sauerbrunn	6 June 1985 (aged 33)	143	0	(United States Soccer Federation) Utah Royals FC
5	DF	Kelley O'Hara	4 August 1988 (aged 30)	108	2	(United States Soccer Federation) Utah Royals FC
6	MF	Morgan Brian	26 February 1993 (aged 25)	79	6	(United States Soccer Federation) Chicago Red Stars
7	DF	Abby Dahlkemper	13 May 1993 (aged 25)	23	0	(United States Soccer Federation) North Carolina Courage
8	MF	Julie Ertz	6 April 1992 (aged 26)	66	16	(United States Soccer Federation) Chicago Red Stars
9	MF	Lindsey Horan	26 May 1994 (aged 24)	56	6	(United States Soccer Federation) Portland Thorns FC
10	FW	Carli Lloyd	16 July 1982 (aged 36)	259	102	(United States Soccer Federation) Sky Blue FC
11	FW	Mallory Pugh	29 April 1998 (aged 20)	37	12	(United States Soccer Federation) Washington Spirit
12	DF	Hailie Mace	24 March 1997 (aged 21)	2	0	(United States Soccer Federation) UCLA Bruins
13	FW	Alex Morgan	2 July 1989 (aged 29)	147	90	(United States Soccer Federation) Orlando Pride
14	DF	Casey Short	23 August 1990 (aged 28)	25	0	(United States Soccer Federation) Chicago Red Stars
15	FW	Megan Rapinoe	5 July 1985 (aged 33)	140	38	(United States Soccer Federation) Seattle Reign FC
16	MF	Rose Lavelle	14 May 1995 (aged 23)	13	3	(United States Soccer Federation) Washington Spirit
17	FW	Tobin Heath	29 May 1988 (aged 30)	138	21	(United States Soccer Federation) Portland Thorns FC
18	GK	Ashlyn Harris	19 October 1985 (aged 32)	17	0	(United States Soccer Federation) Orlando Pride
19	DF	Crystal Dunn	3 July 1992 (aged 26)	70	23	(United States Soccer Federation) North Carolina Courage
20	FW	Christen Press	29 December 1988 (aged 29)	104	45	(United States Soccer Federation) Utah Royals FC

== Group B ==
=== Canada ===
Coach: (Denmark) Kenneth Heiner-Møller

Erin McLeod initially was included in the squad but missed the 2018 CONCACAF Women's Championship due to a foot injury. McLeod was replaced by Kailen Sheridan

No.	Pos.	Player	Date of birth (age)	Caps	Goals	Club
1	GK	Stephanie Labbé	10 October 1986 (aged 31)	52	0	(Swedish Football Association) Linköping
2	DF	Allysha Chapman	25 January 1989 (aged 29)	53	1	(United States Soccer Federation) Houston Dash
3	DF	Kadeisha Buchanan	5 November 1995 (aged 22)	78	3	(French Football Federation) Lyon
4	DF	Shelina Zadorsky	24 August 1992 (aged 26)	40	1	(United States Soccer Federation) Orlando Pride
5	MF	Quinn (Note: Then known as Rebecca Quinn)	11 August 1995 (aged 23)	39	3	(United States Soccer Federation) Washington Spirit
6	FW	Deanne Rose	3 March 1999 (aged 19)	33	7	(United States Soccer Federation) Florida Gators
7	MF	Julia Grosso	29 August 2000 (aged 18)	6	0	(United States Soccer Federation) Texas Longhorns
8	MF	Diana Matheson	6 April 1984 (aged 34)	196	17	(United States Soccer Federation) Utah Royals FC
9	FW	Jordyn Huitema	8 May 2001 (aged 17)	12	2	(Canadian Soccer Association) Vancouver Whitecaps FC–Girls Elite REX
10	DF	Ashley Lawrence	11 June 1995 (aged 23)	63	5	(French Football Federation) Paris Saint-Germain
11	DF	Emma Regan	28 January 2000 (aged 18)	0	0	(United States Soccer Federation) Texas Longhorns
12	FW	Christine Sinclair	12 June 1983 (aged 35)	269	173	(United States Soccer Federation) Portland Thorns FC
13	MF	Sophie Schmidt	28 June 1988 (aged 30)	171	18	Unattached
14	MF	Gabrielle Carle	12 October 1998 (aged 19)	9	1	(United States Soccer Federation) Florida State Seminoles
15	FW	Nichelle Prince	19 February 1995 (aged 23)	39	7	(United States Soccer Federation) Houston Dash
16	FW	Janine Beckie	20 August 1994 (aged 24)	44	22	(The Football Association) Manchester City
17	MF	Jessie Fleming	11 March 1998 (aged 20)	53	6	(United States Soccer Federation) UCLA Bruins
18	GK	Kailen Sheridan	16 July 1995 (aged 23)	5	0	(United States Soccer Federation) Sky Blue FC
19	FW	Adriana Leon	2 October 1992 (aged 26)	50	8	(United States Soccer Federation) Seattle Reign FC
20	DF	Lindsay Agnew	31 March 1995 (aged 23)	8	0	(United States Soccer Federation) Houston Dash

=== Costa Rica ===
Coach: Amelia Valverde

No.	Pos.	Player	Date of birth (age)	Caps	Goals	Club
1	GK	Noelia Bermúdez^{[a]}	20 September 1994 (aged 24)			(Royal Spanish Football Federation) Valencia
2	DF	Gabriela Guillén	1 March 1992 (aged 26)			(Costa Rican Football Federation) Saprissa
3	MF	Priscila Chinchilla	11 July 2001 (aged 17)			(Costa Rican Football Federation) Codea
4	DF	Mariana Benavides	26 December 1994 (aged 23)			(Costa Rican Football Federation) Moravia
5	MF	Mariela Campos	4 January 1991 (aged 27)			(Costa Rican Football Federation) Saprissa
6	DF	Carol Sánchez	16 April 1986 (aged 32)			(Costa Rican Football Federation) Moravia
7	FW	Melissa Herrera	10 October 1996 (aged 21)			(French Football Federation) Stade de Reims
8	DF	Daniela Cruz	8 March 1991 (aged 27)			(Costa Rican Football Federation) Saprissa
9	MF	Gloriana Villalobos	20 August 1999 (aged 19)			(United States Soccer Federation) Florida State Seminoles
10	MF	Shirley Cruz	28 August 1985 (aged 33)			(Chinese Football Association) Jiangsu Suning
11	MF	Raquel Rodríguez	28 October 1993 (aged 24)			(United States Soccer Federation) Sky Blue FC
12	DF	Lixy Rodríguez	4 November 1990 (aged 27)			(Royal Spanish Football Federation) CD Tacón
13	FW	Fabiola Villalobos	13 March 1998 (aged 20)			(Costa Rican Football Federation) Saprissa
14	FW	María Barrantes	7 June 1989 (aged 29)			(Costa Rican Football Federation) Saprissa
15	MF	Cristin Granados	19 August 1989 (aged 29)			(Royal Spanish Football Federation) CD Tacón
16	MF	Katherine Alvarado	11 April 1991 (aged 27)			(Royal Spanish Football Federation) Espanyol
17	FW	María Paula Salas	12 July 2002 (aged 16)			(Costa Rican Football Federation) Saprissa
18	GK	Daniela Solera	21 July 1997 (aged 21)			(Colombian Football Federation) Atletico Huila
19	DF	Fabiola Sánchez	9 April 1993 (aged 25)			(Israel Football Association) F.C. Ramat HaSharon
20	DF	Wendy Acosta	19 December 1989 (aged 28)			(Costa Rican Football Federation) Moravia
23	GK	Yolian Salas^{[a]}	7 April 1997 (aged 21)			(Costa Rican Football Federation) Moravia

^{a} Yolian Salas replaced Noelia Bermúdez after Bermúdez was ruled out due to a radioulnar fracture of the left forearm.

=== Cuba ===
Coach: Reniel Bonora

No.	Pos.	Player	Date of birth (age)	Caps	Goals	Club
1	GK	Lucylena Martínez	28 May 1991 (aged 27)			(Football Association of Cuba) La Habana
2	MF	Lizandra González	21 July 1998 (aged 20)			(Football Association of Cuba) Villa Clara
4	MF	Jessica Pupo	12 September 1990 (aged 28)			(Football Association of Cuba) Camagüey
5	DF	Yarisleidy Mena	17 February 1994 (aged 24)			(Football Association of Cuba) Villa Clara
6	MF	Yaremis Fuentes	30 January 1991 (aged 27)			(Football Association of Cuba) La Habana
7	FW	Maristania Mengana	5 February 2000 (aged 18)			(Football Association of Cuba) Santiago de Cuba
8	MF	María Pérez	7 September 1992 (aged 26)			(Football Association of Cuba) Camagüey
9	MF	Yoanna Calderón	20 September 1994 (aged 24)			(Football Association of Cuba) Artemisa
10	MF	Rachel Peláez	5 May 1993 (aged 25)			(Football Association of Cuba) Camagüey
11	FW	Lilian Pérez	27 April 1999 (aged 19)			(Football Association of Cuba) Villa Clara
12	GK	Katherine Montesino	17 January 1992 (aged 26)			(Football Association of Cuba) La Habana
13	DF	Zailín Rodríguez	28 January 1998 (aged 20)			(Football Association of Cuba) Camagüey
14	DF	Wendy Corcho	17 February 1994 (aged 24)			(Football Association of Cuba) Camagüey
15	DF	Sucel Maceo	21 March 1987 (aged 31)			(Football Association of Cuba) Mayabeque
16	FW	Francis Riquelme*	30 May 1998 (aged 20)			(Football Association of Cuba) La Habana
17	FW	Dianelis Carbonell	27 July 1993 (aged 25)			(Football Association of Cuba) Villa Clara
18	MF	Yeranis Lee	24 March 1999 (aged 19)			(Football Association of Cuba) La Habana
19	MF	Yenifer Ramos*	4 March 1999 (aged 19)			(Football Association of Cuba) Artemisa
20	MF	Laura Moreno	18 September 1993 (aged 25)			(Football Association of Cuba) Villa Clara

- Defected

=== Jamaica ===
Coach: Hue Menzies

No.	Pos.	Player	Date of birth (age)	Caps	Goals	Club
1	GK	Sydney Schneider	31 August 1999 (aged 19)			(United States Soccer Federation) UNC Wilmington Seahawks
2	DF	Lauren Silver	22 March 1993 (aged 25)			Unattached
3	MF	Shanise Foster	3 September 1993 (aged 25)			(Jamaica Football Federation) Arnett Gardens FC
4	MF	Chantelle Swaby	6 August 1998 (aged 20)			(United States Soccer Federation) Rutgers Scarlet Knights
5	DF	Konya Plummer	2 August 1997 (aged 21)			(United States Soccer Federation) Florida Kraze Krush
6	DF	Christina Chang	13 June 1985 (aged 33)			(United States Soccer Federation) FC Surge
7	MF	Chinyelu Asher	20 May 1993 (aged 25)			(United States Soccer Federation) Washington Spirit Reserves
8	MF	Ashleigh Shim	11 November 1993 (aged 24)			Unattached
9	MF	Marlo Sweatman	1 December 1994 (aged 23)			Unattached
10	FW	Jody Brown	16 April 2002 (aged 16)			(United States Soccer Federation) Montverde Academy
11	FW	Khadija Shaw	31 January 1997 (aged 21)			(United States Soccer Federation) Tennessee Volunteers
12	DF	Sashana Campbell	2 March 1991 (aged 27)			(Israel Football Association) Maccabi Kishronot Hadera F.C.
13	GK	Nicole McClure	16 September 1989 (aged 29)			(Swedish Football Association) Sundsvalls DFF
14	DF	Deneisha Blackwood	7 March 1997 (aged 21)			(United States Soccer Federation) Florida Kraze Krush
15	DF	Jadyn Matthews	16 November 1999 (aged 18)			(United States Soccer Federation) Cornell Big Red
16	DF	Dominique Bond-Flasza	11 September 1996 (aged 22)			(Royal Dutch Football Association) PSV Eindhoven
17	DF	Allyson Swaby	3 October 1996 (aged 22)			(Football Association of Iceland) Höttur
18	FW	Trudi Carter	18 November 1994 (aged 23)			(Italian Football Federation) AS Roma
19	MF	Toriana Patterson	2 February 1994 (aged 24)			(United States Soccer Federation) Tti: Bluebonnets
20	MF	Giselle Washington	3 April 2001 (aged 17)			(United States Soccer Federation) Concorde Fire
