= Football at the 2018 Central American and Caribbean Games – Women's team squads =

The following is a list of squads for each nation competing in football at the 2018 Central American and Caribbean Games in Barranquilla.

== Group A ==
=== Colombia ===
Head coach: Nelson Abadía

No.	Pos.	Player	Date of birth (age)	Club
	GK	Vanessa Córdoba	9 May 1995 (aged 23)	(Colombian Football Federation) La Equidad
	GK	Sandra Sepúlveda	3 March 1988 (aged 30)	(Colombian Football Federation) Junior
	DF	Angela Clavijo	1 September 1993 (aged 24)	(Colombian Football Federation) América de Cali
	DF	Daniela Caracas	25 April 1997 (aged 21)	(Colombian Football Federation) Atlético Huila
	DF	Liana Salazar	16 September 1992 (aged 25)	(Colombian Football Federation) Santa Fe
	DF	Manuela Vanegas	9 November 2000 (aged 17)	(Colombian Football Federation) Envigado
	DF	Isabella Echeverri	16 June 1994 (aged 24)	(United States Soccer Federation) Toledo Rockets
	DF	Valentina Jaramillo	10 February 2001 (aged 17)	(Colombian Football Federation) Llaneras F.C.
	MF	Jessica Caro	20 July 1988 (aged 30)	(Colombian Football Federation) Cortuluá
	MF	Marcela Restrepo	10 November 1995 (aged 22)	(Colombian Football Federation) Cortuluá
	MF	Diana Ospina	3 March 1989 (aged 29)	(Colombian Football Federation) Envigado
	MF	Geraldyne Saavedra	16 February 1998 (aged 20)	(Colombian Football Federation) América de Cali
	MF	Estefanía González	4 January 2000 (aged 18)	(Colombian Football Federation) Atlético Nacional
	MF	Viviana Múnera	14 February 1997 (aged 21)	(Colombian Football Federation) Atlético Nacional
	MF	Aura Hoyos	16 April 1998 (aged 20)	(Colombian Football Federation) Atlético Nacional
	MF	Tatiana Castañeda		(Colombian Football Federation) Envigado
	FW	Catalina Usme	25 December 1989 (aged 28)	(Colombian Football Federation) América de Cali
	FW	Carmen Rodallega	15 July 1983 (aged 35)	(Colombian Football Federation) Atlético Huila
	FW	Angie Castañeda	4 February 1998 (aged 20)	(Colombian Football Federation) Santa Fe
	FW	Mayra Ramírez		(Colombian Football Federation) Real Pasión F.C.

=== Costa Rica ===
Head coach: Amelia Valverde.

No.	Pos.	Player	Date of birth (age)	Club
1	GK	Noelia Bermúdez	20 September 1994 (aged 23)	Free agent
2	DF	Gabriela Guillén	1 March 1992 (aged 26)	(Costa Rican Football Federation) Deportivo Saprissa
3	DF	María Paula Coto	2 March 1998 (aged 20)	(Costa Rican Football Federation) AD Moravia
4	DF	Mariana Benavides	26 December 1994 (aged 23)	(Costa Rican Football Federation) AD Moravia
5	FW	Hillary Corrales	4 December 1999 (aged 18)	(Costa Rican Football Federation) Deportivo Saprissa
6	DF	Carol Sánchez	16 April 1986 (aged 32)	(Costa Rican Football Federation) AD Moravia
7	MF	Melissa Herrera	10 October 1996 (aged 21)	Free agent
8	DF	Daniela Cruz	8 March 1991 (aged 27)	(Costa Rican Football Federation) Deportivo Saprissa
9	MF	María Paula Salas	12 July 2002 (aged 16)	(Costa Rican Football Federation) Deportivo Saprissa
10	MF	Gloriana Villalobos	20 August 1999 (aged 18)	(United States Soccer Federation) Florida State Seminoles
11	FW	María Paula Porras	16 July 1989 (aged 29)	(Costa Rican Football Federation) Deportivo Saprissa
12	DF	Lixy Rodríguez	4 November 1990 (aged 27)	(Costa Rican Football Federation) Codea
13	MF	Fabiola Villalobos	13 March 1998 (aged 20)	(Costa Rican Football Federation) Deportivo Saprissa
14	MF	María Fernanda Barrantes	25 January 1996 (aged 22)	(Costa Rican Football Federation) Deportivo Saprissa
15	MF	Cristin Granados	19 August 1989 (aged 28)	Free agent
16	MF	Katherine Alvarado	11 April 1991 (aged 27)	(Royal Spanish Football Federation) Espanyol
17	FW	Karla Villalobos	16 July 1989 (aged 29)	(Costa Rican Football Federation) UCR
18	GK	Daniela Solera	21 July 1997 (aged 21)	(Colombian Football Federation) Atlético Huila
19	DF	Fabiola Sánchez	9 April 1993 (aged 25)	(Israel Football Association) F.C. Ramat HaSharon
20	MF	Mariela Campos	4 January 1991 (aged 27)	(Costa Rican Football Federation) Deportivo Saprissa

=== Jamaica ===
Head coach: Hue Menzies

- Yazmeen Jamieson replaced Sydney Schneider.

No.	Pos.	Player	Date of birth (age)	Club
1	GK	Yazmeen Jamieson	17 March 1998 (aged 20)	(Canadian Soccer Association) Carleton Ravens
2	MF	Lauren Silver	22 March 1993 (aged 25)	Unattached
3	DF	Davia Smith	28 January 1991 (aged 27)	(Jamaica Football Federation) Barbican
4	FW	Kevena Reid	18 September 1998 (aged 19)	(Jamaica Football Federation) GC Foster Collegen
5	DF	Konya Plummer	2 August 1997 (aged 20)	(United States Soccer Federation) Florida Krush
6	FW	Oshay Nelson-Lawes	27 June 1996 (aged 22)	(Canadian Soccer Association) Oakville Bluedevils
7	DF	Erin Mikalsen	21 June 1999 (aged 19)	(United States Soccer Federation) Florida Krush
8	FW	Ashleigh Shim	11 November 1993 (aged 24)	Unattached
9	MF	Sherice Clarke	8 March 2000 (aged 18)	Unattached
10	FW	Jody Brown	16 April 2002 (aged 16)	(United States Soccer Federation) Montverde Academy
11	FW	Khadija Shaw	31 January 1997 (aged 21)	(United States Soccer Federation) Tennessee Lady Volunteers
12	MF	Sashana Campbell	2 March 1991 (aged 27)	Unattached
13	GK	Chris-Ann Chambers	24 October 1995 (aged 22)	Unattached
14	MF	Deneisha Blackwood	7 March 1997 (aged 21)	(United States Soccer Federation) Florida Krush
15	DF	Jadyn Matthews	16 November 1999 (aged 18)	(United States Soccer Federation) Orlando City SC
16	MF	Dominique Bond-Flasza	11 September 1996 (aged 21)	(United States Soccer Federation) Seattle Sounders FC
17	DF	Gabrielle Gayle	14 October 2000 (aged 17)	(United States Soccer Federation) Daytona State College
18	MF	Chinyelu Asher	20 May 1993 (aged 25)	(United States Soccer Federation) Washington Spirit Reserves
19	DF	Toriana Patterson	2 February 1994 (aged 24)	(United States Soccer Federation) TTI Bluebonnets
20	MF	Giselle Washington	3 April 2001 (aged 17)	(United States Soccer Federation) Concord Fire U–18/19

=== Venezuela ===
Head coach: José Catoya

No.	Pos.	Player	Date of birth (age)	Club
	GK	Lisbeth Castro	28 April 1988 (age 38)	(Brazilian Football Confederation) Grêmio Osasco Audax
	GK	Andrea Tovar	22 August 1990 (age 35)	(Colombian Football Federation) Alianza Petrolera
	DF	Nubiluz Rangel	13 August 1993 (age 32)	(Colombian Football Federation) Atlético Nacional
	DF	Petra Cabrera	19 May 1990 (age 35)	(Colombian Football Federation) La Equidad
	DF	Nairelis Gutiérrez	2 July 1995 (age 30)	(Colombian Football Federation) Unión Magdalena
	DF	Soleidys Rengel	3 December 1993 (age 32)	(Colombian Football Federation) Cortuluá
	DF	María Rodríguez	26 November 1994 (age 31)	(Colombian Football Federation) Atlético Bucaramanga
	DF	Rafanny Mendoza	5 November 1996 (age 29)	(Colombian Football Federation) La Equidad
	MF	Paola Villamizar	30 June 1994 (age 31)	(Brazilian Football Confederation) Grêmio Osasco Audax
	MF	Yenifer Giménez	3 May 1996 (age 30)	(French Football Federation) CSFA Ambilly (fr)
	MF	Maikerlin Astudillo	10 May 1992 (age 34)	(Venezuelan Football Federation) Estudiantes de Guárico (es)
	MF	Marialba Zambrano	17 June 1995 (age 30)	(Colombian Football Federation) Cortuluá
	MF	Karla Torres	4 June 1992 (age 33)	(Colombian Football Federation) Atlético Huila
	MF	Neily Carrasquel	26 July 1997 (age 28)	(Colombian Football Federation) Atlético Junior
	MF	Dayana Rodríguez	20 October 2001 (age 24)	(Venezuelan Football Federation) Estudiantes de Guárico (es)
	MF	Wilmary Argüelles	7 April 2001 (age 25)	(Venezuelan Football Federation) Caracas FC
	FW	Oriana Altuve	3 October 1992 (age 33)	(Colombian Football Federation) Santa Fe
	FW	Ysaura Viso	17 June 1993 (age 32)	(Colombian Football Federation) Unión Magdalena
	FW	Yerliane Moreno	13 October 2000 (age 25)	(Venezuelan Football Federation) Deportivo Táchira
	FW	Deyna Castellanos	18 April 1999 (age 27)	(United States Soccer Federation) Florida State Seminoles

== Group B ==
=== Mexico ===
Head coach: Roberto Medina

No.	Pos.	Player	Date of birth (age)	Club
1	GK	Cecilia Santiago	19 October 1994 (aged 23)	(Mexican Football Federation) América
2	DF	Kenti Robles	15 February 1991 (aged 27)	(Royal Spanish Football Federation) Atlético Madrid
3	DF	Christina Murillo	28 January 1993 (aged 25)	(United States Soccer Federation) Chicago Red Stars Reserves
4	DF	Rebeca Bernal	31 August 1997 (aged 20)	(Mexican Football Federation) Monterrey
5	DF	Greta Espinoza	5 June 1995 (aged 23)	(Mexican Football Federation) UANL
6	MF	Nancy Antonio	2 April 1996 (aged 22)	(Mexican Football Federation) UANL
7	MF	Nayeli Rangel	28 February 1992 (aged 26)	(Mexican Football Federation) UANL
8	MF	Karla Nieto	9 January 1995 (aged 23)	(Mexican Football Federation) Pachuca
9	FW	Charlyn Corral	11 September 1991 (aged 26)	(Royal Spanish Football Federation) Levante
10	MF	Yamile Franco	7 July 1992 (aged 26)	(Mexican Football Federation) Toluca
11	FW	Mónica Ocampo	4 January 1987 (aged 31)	(Mexican Football Federation) Pachuca
12	GK	Bianca Henninger	22 October 1990 (aged 27)	(United States Soccer Federation) Houston Dash
13	DF	Jocelyn Orejel	14 November 1996 (aged 21)	(French Football Federation) CSFA Ambilly (fr)
14	DF	Clarissa Robles	9 May 1994 (aged 24)	(United States Soccer Federation) LA Galaxy OC
15	FW	Esmeralda Verdugo	19 January 1994 (aged 24)	(Mexican Football Federation) América
16	MF	Cristina Ferral	16 February 1993 (aged 25)	(Mexican Football Federation) UANL
17	MF	María Sánchez	20 February 1996 (aged 22)	(United States Soccer Federation) Santa Clara Broncos
18	FW	Desirée Monsiváis	19 January 1988 (aged 30)	(Mexican Football Federation) Monterrey
19	FW	Katie Johnson	14 September 1994 (aged 23)	(United States Soccer Federation) Sky Blue FC
20	MF	Carolina Jaramillo	19 March 1994 (aged 24)	(Mexican Football Federation) UANL

=== Nicaragua ===
Head coach: Elna Dixon.

No.	Pos.	Player	Date of birth (age)	Club
1	GK	Bethania Aburto	5 February 1990 (aged 28)	(Nicaraguan Football Federation) Unknown
2	DF	Martha Silva	11 October 1992 (aged 25)	(Nicaraguan Football Federation) Unknown
3	MF	Celeste Escobar	30 April 1993 (aged 25)	(Nicaraguan Football Federation) Unknown
4	DF	Alys Cruz	24 February 1998 (aged 20)	(Nicaraguan Football Federation) Unknown
5	DF	Kelly Ávalos	30 July 1996 (aged 21)	(Nicaraguan Football Federation) Unknown
6	DF	Sheyla Flores (captain)	15 May 1998 (aged 20)	(Nicaraguan Football Federation) Unknown
7	FW	Julissa Acevedo	7 August 1991 (aged 26)	(Nicaraguan Football Federation) Unknown
8	MF	Cinthya Orozco	1 January 1994 (aged 24)	(Nicaraguan Football Federation) Unknown
9	FW	Shanelly Treminio	1 January 2000 (aged 18)	(Nicaraguan Football Federation) Unknown
10	FW	Katherine Pereira	22 May 1999 (aged 19)	(Nicaraguan Football Federation) Unknown
11	MF	Yessenia Flores	7 July 1999 (aged 19)	(Nicaraguan Football Federation) Unknown
12	GK	Beykel Méndez	22 October 1990 (aged 27)	(Nicaraguan Football Federation) Unknown
13	FW	Jansy Aguirre	18 February 1991 (aged 27)	(Nicaraguan Football Federation) Unknown
14	DF	Kesly Pérez	9 May 1994 (aged 24)	(Nicaraguan Football Federation) Unknown
15	FW	Ninoska Solís	26 February 1993 (aged 25)	(Nicaraguan Football Federation) Unknown
16	DF	Diana Ortega	27 December 1999 (aged 18)	(Nicaraguan Football Federation) Unknown
17	FW	Josseling Berríos	3 December 1993 (aged 24)	(Nicaraguan Football Federation) Unknown
18	DF	Elizabeth Arcia	31 March 1997 (aged 21)	(Nicaraguan Football Federation) Unknown
19	FW	Doriana Aguilar	2 January 1994 (aged 24)	(Nicaraguan Football Federation) Unknown
20	MF	Natalie Orellana	4 February 2001 (aged 17)	(United States Soccer Federation) Pinole Valley Spartans

=== Trinidad and Tobago ===
Head coach: Jamaal Shabazz

No.	Pos.	Player	Date of birth (age)	Club
1	GK	Kimika Forbes	26 August 1990 (aged 27)	
2	DF	Ayana Russell	16 March 1988 (aged 30)	
3	DF	Jenelle Cunningham	29 April 1990 (aged 28)	
4	DF	Rhea Belgrave	19 July 1991 (aged 27)	
5	DF	Arin King	8 February 1991 (aged 27)	
6	FW	Natasha St. Louis	1 November 1991 (aged 26)	
7	DF	Jonelle Cato	14 March 1995 (aged 23)	
8	DF	Patrice Superville	8 April 1987 (aged 31)	
9	FW	Mariah Shade	9 December 1991 (aged 26)	
10	MF	Tasha St. Louis	20 December 1983 (aged 34)	
11	MF	Janine Francois	1 January 1989 (aged 29)	
12	MF	Shanelle Arjoon	6 May 1997 (aged 21)	
13	DF	Natisha John	6 May 2000 (aged 18)	
14	MF	Karyn Forbes	27 August 1992 (aged 25)	
15	MF	Kédie Johnson	19 November 2000 (aged 17)	
16	DF	Liana Hinds	23 February 1995 (aged 23)	
17	MF	Afiyah Cornwall	12 December 2001 (aged 16)	
18	MF	Naomie Guerra	1 June 1996 (aged 22)	
19	FW	Aaliyah Prince	5 February 2001 (aged 17)	
20	GK	Saundra Baron	20 July 1993 (aged 24)	
