= 2018 CFU Women's Challenge Series =

Tournament details
- Host countries: Saint Kitts and Nevis (Group A); Jamaica (Group B); Haiti (Group C); Antigua and Barbuda (Group D); Trinidad and Tobago (Group E)
- Dates: 18–29 April 2018
- Teams: 20 (from 1 sub-confederation)

Tournament statistics
- Matches played: 20
- Goals scored: 88 (4.4 per match)
- Top scorer: (Haiti) Batcheba Louis (7 goals)

The 2018 CFU Women's Challenge Series was a football competition in the Caribbean region, held amongst the women's national teams whose football associations are affiliated with the Caribbean Football Union (CFU), a sub-confederation of CONCACAF.

The competition was announced by the CFU in March 2018. It is the third women's competition organized by the CFU, after the 2000 CFU Women's Caribbean Cup and the 2014 CFU Women's Caribbean Cup. It is played in April 2018 across five venues, and serves as preparation for the CONCACAF Championship and World Cup qualifiers starting in May. Unlike the two previous CFU Women's Caribbean Cup tournaments, there is no final round and thus no overall champion.

== Teams ==
A total of 20 teams (out of 31 CFU members) entered the competition.

- Antigua and Barbuda (H)
- Barbados
- Cuba
- Curaçao
- Dominica
- Dominican Republic
- Grenada
- Guadeloupe
- Guyana
- Haiti (H)
- Jamaica (H)
- Martinique
- Montserrat
- Saint Kitts and Nevis (H)
- Saint Lucia
- Saint Vincent and the Grenadines
- Suriname
- Trinidad and Tobago (H)
- Turks and Caicos Islands
- U.S. Virgin Islands

Notes

- (H): Group hosts

Did not enter

- Anguilla
- Aruba
- Bahamas
- Bermuda
- Bonaire
- British Virgin Islands
- Cayman Islands
- French Guiana
- Puerto Rico
- Saint Martin
- Sint Maarten

== Groups ==
The 20 teams are divided into five groups of four. In each group, teams play each other once at a centralised venue. Medals are awarded to each group winner and runner-up.

=== Group A ===
Host venue: Warner Park Sporting Complex, Basseterre, Saint Kitts and Nevis (all times UTC−4)

Pos	Team	Pld	W	D	L	GF	GA	GD	Pts
1	Saint Lucia	3	2	1	0	2	0	+2	7
2	Saint Kitts & Nevis (H)	3	2	0	1	3	1	+2	6
3	Dominica	3	1	1	1	3	1	+2	4
4	Saint Vincent & Grenadines	3	0	0	3	0	6	−6	0

Source: CFU
(H) Hosts
18 April 2018
17:00

Saint Vincent and the Grenadines	0–1	Saint Lucia
	Report	Marquis 49'

Warner Park Sporting Complex, Basseterre
18 April 2018
19:30

Saint Kitts and Nevis	1–0	Dominica
Lawrence 69'	Report

Warner Park Sporting Complex, Basseterre

20 April 2018
17:00

Saint Lucia	0–0	Dominica
	Report

Warner Park Sporting Complex, Basseterre
20 April 2018
19:30

Saint Kitts and Nevis	2–0	Saint Vincent and the Grenadines
Springer 7'; Wilkinson 17'	Report

Warner Park Sporting Complex, Basseterre

22 April 2018
17:00

Dominica	3–0	Saint Vincent and the Grenadines
Finn 51'; Morgan 61'; Samuel 70'	Report

Warner Park Sporting Complex, Basseterre
22 April 2018
19:30

Saint Kitts and Nevis	0–1	Saint Lucia
	Report	Prospere 22'

Warner Park Sporting Complex, Basseterre

=== Group B ===
Host venue: UWI-JFF Captain Horace Burrell Centre of Excellence and Waterhouse Stadium, Kingston, Jamaica (all times UTC−5)

Pos	Team	Pld	W	D	L	GF	GA	GD	Pts	
1	Cuba	2	2	0	0	8	0	+8	6	
2	Jamaica (H)	2	1	0	1	3	3	0	3	
3	Barbados	2	0	0	2	2	10	−8	0	
4	Turks and Caicos	0	0	0	0	0	0	0	0	Withdrew

Source: CFU
(H) Hosts
18 April 2018
15:30

Cuba	7–0	Barbados
Riquelme 29'; L. Pérez 39'; M. Pérez 42', 44', 63'; Peláez 45', 85'	Report

UWI-JFF Captain Horace Burrell Centre of Excellence, Kingston

20 April 2018
15:30

Jamaica	3–2	Barbados
Reid 34'; Bailey 35'; Palache 49'	Report	Jarvis 29'; Cyrus 50'

UWI-JFF Captain Horace Burrell Centre of Excellence, Kingston

22 April 2018
17:00

Jamaica	0–1	Cuba
	Report	M. Pérez 61'

Waterhouse Stadium, Kingston

=== Group C ===
Host venue: Stade Sylvio Cator, Port-au-Prince, Haiti (all times UTC−4)

Pos	Team	Pld	W	D	L	GF	GA	GD	Pts	
1	Haiti (H)	2	2	0	0	21	0	+21	6	
2	U.S. Virgin Islands	2	0	0	2	0	21	−21	0	
3	Dominican Republic	0	0	0	0	0	0	0	0	Withdrew
4	Martinique	0	0	0	0	0	0	0	0	Withdrew

Source: CFU
(H) Hosts

Note: Due to withdrawal of two teams, the remaining two teams play each other twice.

18 April 2018
18:00

Haiti	7–0	U.S. Virgin Islands
Michel 12', 13'; B. Louis 17', 39'; Jeudy 30'; Nicolas 57'; Éloissaint 78'	Report

Stade Sylvio Cator, Port-au-Prince

20 April 2018
18:00

Haiti	14–0	U.S. Virgin Islands
K. Louis 9'; Michel 12'; Lebrun 29'; Éloissaint 30'; B. Louis 42', 45+3', 71', 79', 87'; Dacius 43', 64', 65'; Jeudy 45', 90'	Report

Stade Sylvio Cator, Port-au-Prince

=== Group D ===
Host venue: Sir Vivian Richards Stadium, North Sound, Antigua and Barbuda (all times UTC−4)

Pos	Team	Pld	W	D	L	GF	GA	GD	Pts	
1	Antigua & Barbuda (H)	2	2	0	0	5	1	+4	6	
2	Curaçao	2	1	0	1	4	4	0	3	
3	Guadeloupe	2	0	0	2	2	6	−4	0	
4	Montserrat	0	0	0	0	0	0	0	0	Withdrew

Source: CFU
(H) Hosts
25 April 2018
18:00

Guadeloupe	2–3	Curaçao
Pierre-Justin 27'; Albina 38'	Report	Statia 9'; Emerenciana 59'; Scheepers 77'

Sir Vivian Richards Stadium, North Sound

27 April 2018
18:00

Antigua and Barbuda	2–1	Curaçao
Davis 15'; Jacobs 80'	Report	Tittle 56' (o.g.)

Sir Vivian Richards Stadium, North Sound

29 April 2018
16:30

Antigua and Barbuda	3–0	Guadeloupe
Jacobs 28' (pen.), 64'; Davis 49'	Report

Sir Vivian Richards Stadium, North Sound

=== Group E ===
Host venue: Ato Boldon Stadium, Couva, Trinidad and Tobago (all times UTC−4)

Pos	Team	Pld	W	D	L	GF	GA	GD	Pts
1	Trinidad & Tobago (H)	3	3	0	0	18	2	+16	9
2	Suriname	3	1	1	1	8	14	−6	4
3	Guyana	3	0	2	1	3	5	−2	2
4	Grenada	3	0	1	2	6	14	−8	1

Source: CFU
(H) Hosts
25 April 2018
16:00

Guyana	0–0	Grenada
	Report

Ato Boldon Stadium, Couva
25 April 2018
18:30

Trinidad and Tobago	7–0	Suriname
Arjoon 4', 45'; T. St. Louis 11'; Superville 30'; Forbes 36'; Shade 41'; Cato 52'	Report

Ato Boldon Stadium, Couva

27 April 2018
16:00

Suriname	2–2	Guyana
Hoogdorp 45'; Riley 65'	Report	Smith 21'; Persaud 56'

Ato Boldon Stadium, Couva
27 April 2018
18:30

Trinidad and Tobago	8–1	Grenada
Forbes 12', 90'; N. St. Louis 46', 69'; Hinds 63'; Prince 66', 79', 84'	Report	Julien 16'

Ato Boldon Stadium, Couva

29 April 2018
15:00

Grenada	5–6	Suriname
M. Charles 13'; S. Charles 20'; Frank 44', 55', 86'	Report	Rigters 17'; Riley 27', 47', 65', 67'; Weegman 36'

Ato Boldon Stadium, Couva
29 April 2018
17:30

Trinidad and Tobago	3–1	Guyana
Paul 12'; Forbes 75'; Cato 88'	Report	El-Masri 63' (pen.)

Ato Boldon Stadium, Couva

== Goalscorers ==
7 goals

- (Haiti) Batcheba Louis

5 goals

- (Suriname) Orthea Riley

4 goals

- (Cuba) María Pérez
- (Trinidad and Tobago) Karyn Forbes

3 goals

- (Antigua and Barbuda) Kai Jacobs
- (Grenada) Roneisha Frank
- (Haiti) Melissa Dacius
- (Haiti) Sherly Jeudy
- (Haiti) Phiseline Michel
- (Trinidad and Tobago) Aaliyah Prince

2 goals

- (Antigua and Barbuda) Portia Davis
- (Cuba) Rachel Peláez
- (Haiti) Roseline Éloissaint
- (Trinidad and Tobago) Shanelle Arjoon
- (Trinidad and Tobago) Jonelle Cato
- (Trinidad and Tobago) Natasha St. Louis

1 goal

- (Barbados) Rianna Cyrus
- (Barbados) Felicia Jarvis
- (Cuba) Lilian Pérez
- (Cuba) Francis Riquelme
- (Curaçao) Nuhely Emerenciana
- (Curaçao) Diante Scheepers
- (Curaçao) Samantha Statia
- (Dominica) Sari Finn
- (Dominica) Michlyn Morgan
- (Dominica) Kasika Samuel
- (Grenada) Merrisa Charles
- (Grenada) Sheranda Charles
- (Grenada) Kristal Julien
- (Guadeloupe) Tracy Albina
- (Guadeloupe) Mégane Pierre-Justin
- (Guyana) Mariam El-Masri
- (Guyana) Brittany Persaud
- (Guyana) Tiandi Smith
- (Haiti) Isnada Lebrun
- (Haiti) Kethna Louis
- (Haiti) Nelourde Nicolas
- (Jamaica) Shantel Bailey
- (Jamaica) Roshana Palache
- (Jamaica) Kevena Reid
- (Saint Kitts and Nevis) Brittney Lawrence
- (Saint Kitts and Nevis) Caroline Springer
- (Saint Kitts and Nevis) Leranja Wilkinson
- (Saint Lucia) Ellaisa Marquis
- (Saint Lucia) Sasha Prospere
- (Suriname) Saffira Hoogdorp
- (Suriname) Sabrina Rigters
- (Suriname) Ulstra Weegman
- (Trinidad and Tobago) Liana Hinds
- (Trinidad and Tobago) Shenieka Paul
- (Trinidad and Tobago) Mariah Shade
- (Trinidad and Tobago) Patrice Superville
- (Trinidad and Tobago) Tasha St. Louis

1 own goal

- (Antigua and Barbuda) Devikka Tittle (playing against Curaçao)
