= Aaliyah Prince =

Trinidadian footballer

Personal information
- Date of birth: 5 February 2001 (age 25)
- Place of birth: Morvant, Trinidad and Tobago
- Positions: Forward; midfielder

College career
Years	Team	Apps	(Gls)
2019	Northeast Texas Eagles	16	(13)

International career^{‡}
2016	Trinidad and Tobago U-15		
2018	Trinidad and Tobago U-18 (futsal)		
2018–	Trinidad and Tobago U-20		
2018–	Trinidad and Tobago	19	(8)
- ‡ National team caps and goals as of 11:04, April 18, 2026 (UTC)

Aaliyah Prince (born 5 February 2001) is a Trinidadian footballer who plays as a midfielder for American college Northeast Texas Eagles and the Trinidad and Tobago women's national team.

== International career ==
Prince represented Trinidad and Tobago at the 2016 CONCACAF Girls' U-15 Championship and two CONCACAF Women's U-20 Championship editions (2018 and 2020). At senior level, she played the 2018 CFU Women's Challenge Series, the 2018 CONCACAF Women's Championship qualification and the 2020 CONCACAF Women's Olympic Qualifying Championship qualification.

=== International goals ===
Scores and results list Trinidad and Tobago' goal tally first.

No.	Date	Venue	Opponent	Score	Result	Competition
1	27 April 2018	Ato Boldon Stadium, Couva, Trinidad and Tobago	Grenada	4–1	8–1	2018 CFU Women's Challenge Series
2	27 April 2018	Ato Boldon Stadium, Couva, Trinidad and Tobago	Grenada	6–1	8–1	2018 CFU Women's Challenge Series
3	27 April 2018	Ato Boldon Stadium, Couva, Trinidad and Tobago	Grenada	7–1	8–1	2018 CFU Women's Challenge Series
4	27 May 2018	Ato Boldon Stadium, Couva, Trinidad and Tobago	Grenada	5–0	13–0	2018 CONCACAF Women's Championship qualification
5	27 May 2018	Ato Boldon Stadium, Couva, Trinidad and Tobago	Grenada	11–0	13–0	2018 CONCACAF Women's Championship qualification
6	27 May 2018	Ato Boldon Stadium, Couva, Trinidad and Tobago	Grenada	12–0	13–0	2018 CONCACAF Women's Championship qualification
7	2 October 2019	Ato Boldon Stadium, Couva, Trinidad and Tobago	Antigua and Barbuda	4–0	5–0	2020 CONCACAF Women's Olympic Qualifying Championship qualification
8	1 December 2025	Kensington Oval, Bridgetown, Barbados	Barbados	4–0	5–0	2026 CONCACAF W Championship qualification
