= Jonelle =

Jonelle is a feminine given name. Notable people with the name include:

- Jonelle Allen (born 1944), American actress, singer and dancer
- Jonelle Cato (born 1995), Trinidad and Tobago soccer player
- Jonelle Filigno (born 1990), Canadian soccer player
- Jonelle Layfield, Miss Hawaii USA 2008
- Jonelle Matthews (1972–1984), American murder victim
- Jonelle Price (born 1980), New Zealand Olympic equestrian
