= Kennya Cordner =

Tobagonian footballer

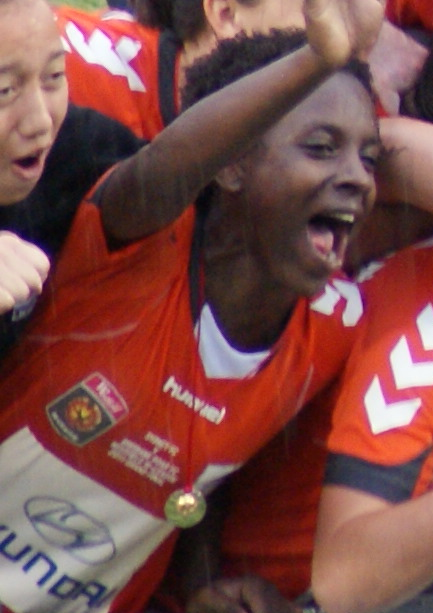
- With Brisbane Roar FC in 2011

Personal information
- Full name: Kennya Kinda Esther Cordner
- Date of birth: 11 November 1988 (age 38)
- Place of birth: Speyside, Trinidad and Tobago
- Height: 5 ft 3 in (1.60 m)
- Position: Forward

Team information
- Current team: Çekmeköy BilgiDoğa

College career
Years	Team	Apps	(Gls)
2006–2007	Young Harris Mountain Lions		

Senior career*
Years	Team	Apps	(Gls)
2007	Northampton Laurels FC		(6)
2009	Kvarnsvedens IK		(5)
2011	Brisbane Roar FC	5	(1)
2011	San Juan Jabloteh FC	2	(16)
2013	Seattle Reign Reserves	3	(4)
2013	Seattle Reign FC	3	(0)
2014	Seattle Sounders Women		
2017	FC Dallas Women		
2017	Sportivo Limpeño		
2018–2021	IL Sandviken	64	(32)
2021–2023	Fenerbahçe	41	(43)
- Henan Jianye
2024–	Beylerbeyi	6	(1)

International career^{‡}
2004	Trinidad and Tobago U-19	3+	(3)
2005–2008	Trinidad and Tobago U-20	11+	(31)
2006–	Trinidad and Tobago	57+	(48)
- * Club domestic league appearances and goals as of 22 December 2024 ‡ National team caps and goals as of 11:02, April 18, 2026 (UTC)

Kennya Kinda Esther Cordner (born 11 November 1988) is a Tobagonian professional women's football forward who plays in the Turkish Super League for Çekmeköy BilgiDoğa, and in the Trinidad and Tobago women's national team.

Previously Seattle Sounders Women in the W-League, the Brisbane Roar FC of Australia's W-League as well as the Northampton Laurels FC and Seattle Reign FC in the National Women's Soccer League (NWSL).

== Early life ==
Cordner grew up in Speyside, Tobago where she attended Signal Hill Secondary Comprehensive. It was at Signal Hill where she was introduced to football.

=== Young Harris College ===
Cordner attended Young Harris College, a private university located in the state of Georgia in the United States. In 2006, she scored 18 goals and provided nine assists in the 13 games that she played for the Mountain Lions. In 2007, she played in 17 matches, scoring 37 goals, serving 13 assists for a total of 87 points for the season – the highest in the program.

== Playing career ==
=== Club ===
==== Northampton Laurels FC ====
In 2006, Cordner signed with the Northampton Laurels FC in the WPSL, the highest division of women's professional soccer available in the United States at the time. At the time of her signing, the team was ranked third in the WPSL Eastern Conference – South Division. With Cordner's game-winning goal over top-seeded side Adirondack Lynx, she helped secure Northampton's place in the playoffs.

==== Kvarnsvedens IK ====
Cordner signed with Swedish side, Kvarnsvedens IK, for part of the 2009 season. She scored five goals for the squad.

==== Brisbane Roar ====
Cordner signed with the Brisbane Roar FC in late 2010 for the remaining two months of the 2010–2011 season. Of her signing she stated, "The quality of football here (in Australia) is much higher than that of my previous encounters, apart from national duty, and I am sure it will improve my game. This means a whole lot for my career because not only do I have the opportunity to become a better player, but set a standard be a role model for the younger players coming up." She made four appearances playing a total of 99 minutes and scored one goal helping the Roar ultimately win the 2010–2011 W-League Championship.

==== San Juan Jabloteh FC ====
Cordner played for San Juan Jabloteh FC of the Lucky Bakery Women's Super League in the summer of 2011. During a match against the Arima Giants, she scored seven goals launching the team to the top of the league standings. During another match against the Tunapuna Titans, she scored nine goals.

==== Seattle Reign FC Reserves ====
Cordner signed with Issaquah SC, the reserve team for the NWSL's Seattle Reign FC for the 2013 season. During her debut with the team, she scored two goals against Emerald City FC.

==== Seattle Reign FC ====
On 19 June 2013, it was announced that Cordner had signed with the Seattle Reign FC part way through the inaugural season of the National Women's Soccer League. Of the signing, Reign FC head coach Laura Harvey said, "At every level she has played Kennya has shown she knows how to find the net. We are clearly a club that is in need of a player who can consistently deliver goals, so we are excited to see the impact Kennya can have in the NWSL." Cordner made two appearances for the club and was waived in mid-July to make way another international player on the squad. NWSL rules allow only two international players on a team.

==== Sportivo Limpeño ====
In 2016, Cordner joined Paraguayan team Sportivo Limpeño, integrating into the squad with her compatriot with Kimika Forbes.

=== Fenerbahçe ===
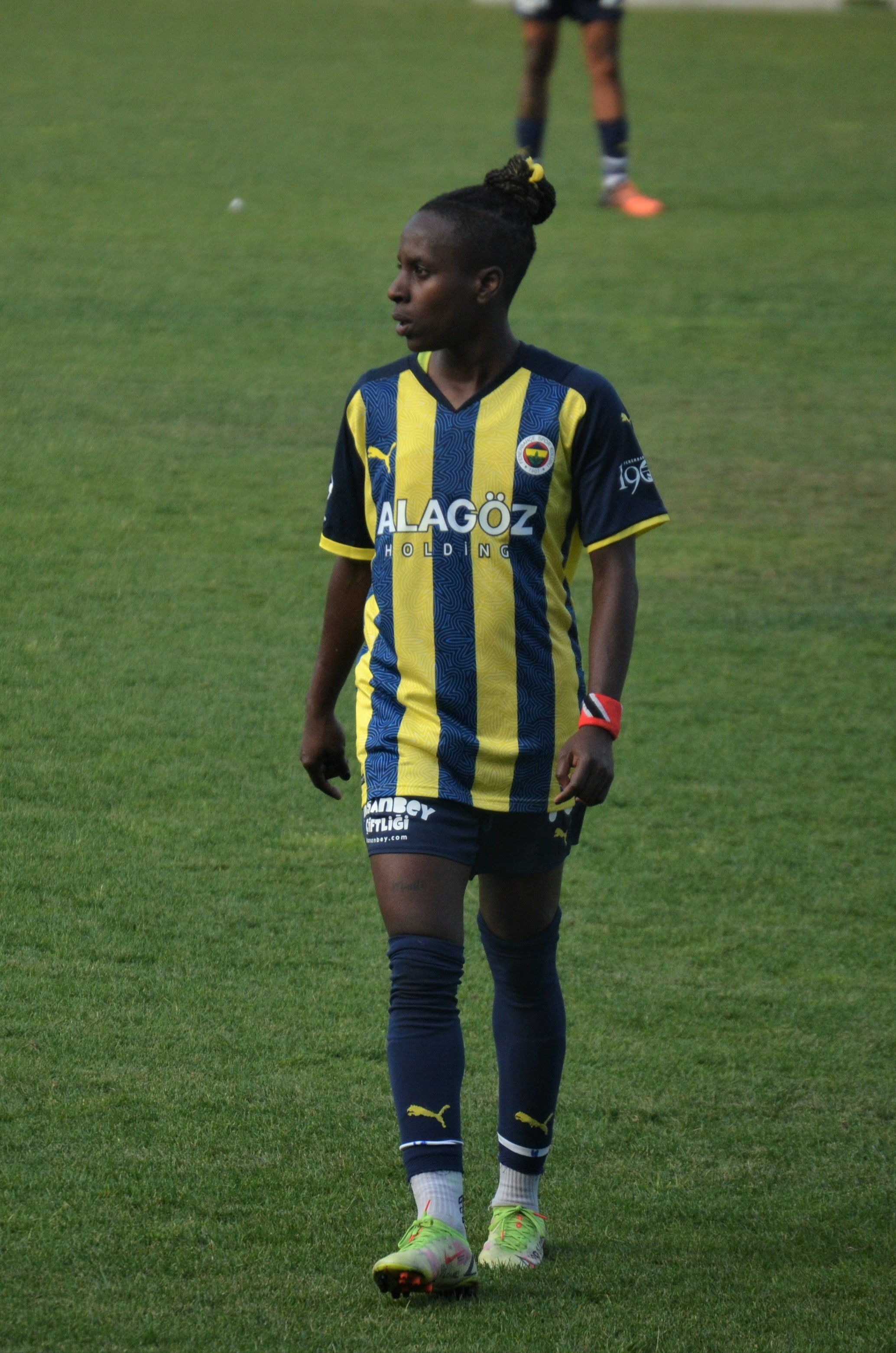
Kennya Cordner of Fenerbahçe in the 2021-22 Turkish Women's Football Super League.

Mid December 2021, Cordner moved to Turkey, and signed a deal with Fenerbahçe from Istanbul to playe in the 2021-22 Super League season. She netted 34 goals in 25 matches played, and became the top goalscorer of the season. She played also in the next season for Fenerbahçe. End July 2023, she left Turkey for China.

=== Henan Jianye ===
In September 2023, she transferred to the Chinese club Henan Jianye, which play in the Super League.

=== Beylerbeyi ===
In November 2024, she returned to Turkey, and joined the Istanbul-based club Beylerbeyi to play in the 2024-25 Super League season.

== International career ==
Cordner made her first appearance for the Trinidad and Tobago women's national football team at age 15. She is a leading scorer for the team. In July 2011, she scored nine goals during the Women's Olympic Football Qualifying match against Dominica leading the Trinidad and Tobagonian squad to a 15–1 win.

=== International goals ===
Scores and results list Trinidad and Tobago' goal tally first.

No.	Date	Venue	Opponent	Score	Result	Competition
1	19 May 2006	Larry Gomes Stadium, Arima, Trinidad and Tobago	Grenada	10–0	10–0	2006 CONCACAF Women's Gold Cup qualification
2	21 May 2006	Larry Gomes Stadium, Arima, Trinidad and Tobago	Saint Vincent and the Grenadines	2–0	4–1	2006 CONCACAF Women's Gold Cup qualification
3	10 September 2006	Larry Gomes Stadium, Arima, Trinidad and Tobago	Dominican Republic	7–0	7–0	2006 CONCACAF Women's Gold Cup qualification
4	23 November 2007	Juan Ramón Loubriel Stadium, Bayamón, Puerto Rico	Puerto Rico	1–0	2–1	2008 CONCACAF Women's Pre-Olympic Tournament qualification
5	4 April 2008	Estadio Olímpico Benito Juárez, Ciudad Juarez, Mexico	Costa Rica	1–0	2–2	2008 CONCACAF Women's Pre-Olympic Tournament
6	10 May 2010	Marvin Lee Stadium, Macoya, Trinidad and Tobago	Saint Lucia	2–0	6–1	2010 CONCACAF Women's World Cup Qualifying qualification
7	10 May 2010	Marvin Lee Stadium, Macoya, Trinidad and Tobago	Saint Lucia	4–0	6–1	2010 CONCACAF Women's World Cup Qualifying qualification
8	12 May 2010	Marvin Lee Stadium, Macoya, Trinidad and Tobago	Barbados	5–0	5–0	2010 CONCACAF Women's World Cup Qualifying qualification
9	14 May 2010	Marvin Lee Stadium, Macoya, Trinidad and Tobago	Guyana	1–0	3–0	2010 CONCACAF Women's World Cup Qualifying qualification
10	14 May 2010	Marvin Lee Stadium, Macoya, Trinidad and Tobago	Guyana	3–0	3–0	2010 CONCACAF Women's World Cup Qualifying qualification
11	24 July 2010	Estadio Metropolitano, Mérida, Venezuela	Nicaragua	4–0	4–0	2010 Central American and Caribbean Games
12	28 July 2010	Estadio Metropolitano, Mérida, Venezuela	Puerto Rico	1–0	3–2	2010 Central American and Caribbean Games
13	28 July 2010	Estadio Metropolitano, Mérida, Venezuela	Puerto Rico	2–0	3–2	2010 Central American and Caribbean Games
14	30 July 2010	Estadio Metropolitano, Mérida, Venezuela	Guatemala	1–1	3–2	2010 Central American and Caribbean Games
15	16 October 2010	Revolución Stadium, Guatemala City, Guatemala	Guatemala	1–1	3–2	Friendly
16	16 October 2010	Revolución Stadium, Guatemala City, Guatemala	Guatemala	2–1	3–2	Friendly
17	2 November 2010	Estadio de Béisbol Beto Ávila, Cancún, Mexico	Guyana	1–0	4–1	2010 CONCACAF Women's World Cup Qualifying
18	5 July 2011	Estadio Panamericano, San Cristóbal, Dominican Republic	Bermuda	1–0	5–1	2012 CONCACAF Women's Olympic Qualifying Tournament qualification
19	7 July 2011	Estadio Panamericano, San Cristóbal, Dominican Republic	Dominica	1–0	14–1	2012 CONCACAF Women's Olympic Qualifying Tournament qualification
20	7 July 2011	Estadio Panamericano, San Cristóbal, Dominican Republic	Dominica	4–0	14–1	2012 CONCACAF Women's Olympic Qualifying Tournament qualification
21	7 July 2011	Estadio Panamericano, San Cristóbal, Dominican Republic	Dominica	6–0	14–1	2012 CONCACAF Women's Olympic Qualifying Tournament qualification
22	7 July 2011	Estadio Panamericano, San Cristóbal, Dominican Republic	Dominica	7–0	14–1	2012 CONCACAF Women's Olympic Qualifying Tournament qualification
23	7 July 2011	Estadio Panamericano, San Cristóbal, Dominican Republic	Dominica	8–0	14–1	2012 CONCACAF Women's Olympic Qualifying Tournament qualification
24	7 July 2011	Estadio Panamericano, San Cristóbal, Dominican Republic	Dominica	9–1	14–1	2012 CONCACAF Women's Olympic Qualifying Tournament qualification
25	7 July 2011	Estadio Panamericano, San Cristóbal, Dominican Republic	Dominica	10–1	14–1	2012 CONCACAF Women's Olympic Qualifying Tournament qualification
26	7 July 2011	Estadio Panamericano, San Cristóbal, Dominican Republic	Dominica	11–1	14–1	2012 CONCACAF Women's Olympic Qualifying Tournament qualification
27	7 July 2011	Estadio Panamericano, San Cristóbal, Dominican Republic	Dominica	13–1	14–1	2012 CONCACAF Women's Olympic Qualifying Tournament qualification
28	3 December 2012	FIFA Goal Project Centre, San Jose, Costa Rica	Costa Rica	?–0	4–0	Friendly
29	3 December 2012	FIFA Goal Project Centre, San Jose, Costa Rica	Costa Rica	?–0	4–0	Friendly
30	3 December 2012	FIFA Goal Project Centre, San Jose, Costa Rica	Costa Rica	?–0	4–0	Friendly
31	6 July 2014	Ato Boldon Stadium, Couva, Trinidad and Tobago	Venezuela	1–0	5–0	Friendly
32	6 July 2014	Ato Boldon Stadium, Couva, Trinidad and Tobago	Venezuela	3–0	5–0	Friendly
33	6 July 2014	Ato Boldon Stadium, Couva, Trinidad and Tobago	Venezuela	5–0	5–0	Friendly
34	20 August 2014	Hasely Crawford Stadium, Port of Spain, Trinidad and Tobago	Saint Kitts and Nevis	1–0	10–0	2014 CFU Women's Caribbean Cup
35	20 August 2014	Hasely Crawford Stadium, Port of Spain, Trinidad and Tobago	Saint Kitts and Nevis	3–0	10–0	2014 CFU Women's Caribbean Cup
36	24 August 2014	Hasely Crawford Stadium, Port of Spain, Trinidad and Tobago	Martinique	1–0	7–0	2014 CFU Women's Caribbean Cup
37	17 October 2014	Toyota Park, Bridgeview, United States	Haiti	1–0	1–0	2014 CONCACAF Women's Championship
38	20 October 2014	RFK Stadium, Washington, United States	Guatemala	1–0	2–1	2014 CONCACAF Women's Championship
39	26 October 2014	PPL Park, Chester, United States	Mexico	1–1	2–4	2014 CONCACAF Women's Championship
40	14 July 2015	Hamilton Pan Am Soccer Stadium, Hamilton, Canada	Colombia	1–1	1–1	2015 Pan American Games
41	11 February 2016	BBVA Compass Stadium, Houston, United States	Guatemala	1–1	2–1	2016 CONCACAF Women's Olympic Qualifying Championship
42	16 February 2016	BBVA Compass Stadium, Houston, United States	Guyana	1–0	5–1	2016 CONCACAF Women's Olympic Qualifying Championship
43	16 February 2016	BBVA Compass Stadium, Houston, United States	Guyana	5–1	5–1	2016 CONCACAF Women's Olympic Qualifying Championship
44	29 August 2018	National Stadium, Kingston, Jamaica	Antigua and Barbuda	5–0	5–0	2018 CONCACAF Women's Championship qualification
45	2 September 2018	National Stadium, Kingston, Jamaica	Bermuda	2–0	3–0	2018 CONCACAF Women's Championship qualification
46	2 September 2018	National Stadium, Kingston, Jamaica	Bermuda	3–0	3–0	2018 CONCACAF Women's Championship qualification
47	25 October 2021	Ato Boldon Stadium, Couva, Trinidad and Tobago	Panama	1–0	1–1	Friendly
48	1 December 2025	Kensington Oval, Bridgetown, Barbados	Barbados	1–0	5–0	2026 CONCACAF W Championship qualification

== Honors and awards ==
- 2005 Trinidad and Tobago Female Footballer of the Year
- 2010 Trinidad and Tobago Female Footballer of the Year
- 2021 Trinidad and Tobago Female Footballer of the Year
