= Natasha St. Louis =

Trinidad and Tobago footballer

Personal information
- Date of birth: 1 November 1991 (age 34)
- Place of birth: Trinidad and Tobago
- Position: Forward

Senior career*
Years	Team	Apps	(Gls)
- St. Ann's Rangers

International career^{‡}
2009–2010	Trinidad and Tobago U20	8	(9)
2010–2018	Trinidad and Tobago	15	(2)
- * Club domestic league appearances and goals ‡ National team caps and goals as of 10 October 2018

Natasha St. Louis (born 1 November 1991) is a Trinidad and Tobago footballer who plays as a forward. She has been a member of the Trinidad and Tobago women's national team.

== International career ==
St. Louis represented Trinidad and Tobago at the 2010 CONCACAF Women's U-20 Championship. At senior level, she capped during two CONCACAF Women's Championship editions (2010 and 2018), two Central American and Caribbean Games editions (2014 and 2018) and the 2018 CFU Women's Challenge Series.

=== International goals ===
Scores and results list Trinidad and Tobago' goal tally first.

No.	Date	Venue	Opponent	Score	Result	Competition
1	27 April 2018	Ato Boldon Stadium, Couva, Trinidad and Tobago	Grenada	2–1	8–1	2018 CFU Women's Challenge Series
2	27 April 2018	Ato Boldon Stadium, Couva, Trinidad and Tobago	Grenada	5–1	8–1	2018 CFU Women's Challenge Series
