= Phiseline Michel =

Haitian footballer (born 1997)

Personal information
- Date of birth: 27 July 1997 (age 29)
- Place of birth: Borel, Artibonite, Haiti
- Position: Defensive midfielder

Team information
- Current team: CS Fabrose

Senior career*
Years	Team	Apps	(Gls)
- CS Fabrose

International career^{‡}
2018–	Haiti	2+	(3)
- * Club domestic league appearances and goals ‡ National team caps and goals as of 20 April 2018

Phiseline Michel (born 27 July 1997) is a Haitian footballer who plays as a defensive midfielder for Canadian club CS Fabrose and the Haiti women's national team.

== International goals ==
Scores and results list Haiti's goal tally first

No.	Date	Venue	Opponent	Score	Result	Competition
1	18 April 2018	Stade Sylvio Cator, Port-au-Prince, Haiti	U.S. Virgin Islands	1–0	7–0	2018 CFU Women's Challenge Series
2	18 April 2018	Stade Sylvio Cator, Port-au-Prince, Haiti	U.S. Virgin Islands	2–0	7–0	2018 CFU Women's Challenge Series
3	20 April 2018	Stade Sylvio Cator, Port-au-Prince, Haiti	U.S. Virgin Islands	2–0	14–0	2018 CFU Women's Challenge Series
