= Women's football in Montserrat =

Montserrat
- Association: Montserrat Football Association
- Confederation: CONCACAF (North America)
- Sub-confederation: CFU (Caribbean)
- FIFA code: MSR
First colours	Second colours

Montserrat women's national football team has not played a single FIFA recognised match, though they were scheduled to before withdrawing from the competition. Montserrat Football Association was created in 1994 and became a FIFA affiliate in 1996.

== History ==
In 1985, few countries in the world had a women's national football team, including Montserrat. Between 1985 and April 2012, the team did not play in a single FIFA recognised match. They were supposed to compete in the Caribbean qualifying for the 2002 CONCACAF Women's Gold Cup. On 30 June, they should have played against the United States Virgin Islands but they withdrew from the tournament. Likewise, they were supposed to compete in the qualifying for the 2006 CONCACAF Women's Gold Cup. They were supposed to have played St. Kitts and Nevis but withdrew from the tournament. In March 2012, the team was not ranked in the world by FIFA. The team was intended to appear in the 2018 CFU Women's Challenge Series, but again withdrew.

== Background and development ==
The national federation was created in 1994 and became a FIFA affiliate in 1996.
