= Karyn Forbes =

Tobagonian footballer

Personal information
- Date of birth: 27 August 1991 (age 35)
- Place of birth: Plymouth, Trinidad and Tobago
- Position: Midfielder

College career
Years	Team	Apps	(Gls)
2013	Northwood-Texas Knights		
2014–2016	West Texas A&M Buffaloes	42	(7)

Senior career*
Years	Team	Apps	(Gls)
2019-	Fjarðab/Höttur/Leiknir	12	(2)

International career^{‡}
2008	Trinidad and Tobago U17	2+	(3)
2005–2010	Trinidad and Tobago U20	10+	(4)
2010–	Trinidad and Tobago	72+	(20)
- * Club domestic league appearances and goals as of 7 September 2019 ‡ National team caps and goals as of 6 December 2023

Karyn Forbes (born 27 August 1991) is a Tobagonian footballer who plays as a midfielder for the Trinidad and Tobago women's national team.

== International goals ==
Scores and results list Trinidad and Tobago' goal tally first.

No.	Date	Venue	Opponent	Score	Result	Competition
1	7 October 2007	Dr. Ir. Franklin Essed Stadion, Paramaribo, Suriname	Suriname	3–0	4–1	2008 CONCACAF Women's Pre-Olympic Tournament qualification
2	28 July 2010	Estadio Metropolitano, Mérida, Venezuela	Puerto Rico	3–1	3–2	2010 Central American and Caribbean Games
3	30 July 2010	Estadio Metropolitano, Mérida, Venezuela	Guatemala	2–1	3–2	2010 Central American and Caribbean Games
4	5 July 2011	Estadio Panamericano, San Cristóbal, Dominican Republic	Bermuda	5–1	5–1	2012 CONCACAF Women's Olympic Qualifying Tournament qualification
5	7 July 2011	Estadio Panamericano, San Cristóbal, Dominican Republic	Dominica	2–0	14–1	2012 CONCACAF Women's Olympic Qualifying Tournament qualification
6	7 July 2011	Estadio Panamericano, San Cristóbal, Dominican Republic	Dominica	12–1	14–1	2012 CONCACAF Women's Olympic Qualifying Tournament qualification
7	7 July 2011	Estadio Panamericano, San Cristóbal, Dominican Republic	Dominica	14–1	14–1	2012 CONCACAF Women's Olympic Qualifying Tournament qualification
8	20 November 2015	Ato Boldon Stadium, Couva, Trinidad and Tobago	Puerto Rico	1–0	1–0	2016 CONCACAF Women's Olympic Qualifying Championship qualification
9	25 April 2018	Ato Boldon Stadium, Couva, Trinidad and Tobago	Suriname	4–0	7–0	2018 CFU Women's Challenge Series
10	27 April 2018	Ato Boldon Stadium, Couva, Trinidad and Tobago	Grenada	1–0	8–1	2018 CFU Women's Challenge Series
11	27 April 2018	Ato Boldon Stadium, Couva, Trinidad and Tobago	Grenada	8–1	8–1	2018 CFU Women's Challenge Series
12	29 April 2018	Ato Boldon Stadium, Couva, Trinidad and Tobago	Guyana	2–1	3–1	2018 CFU Women's Challenge Series
13	19 May 2018	Ato Boldon Stadium, Couva, Trinidad and Tobago	U.S. Virgin Islands	3–0	10–0	2018 CONCACAF Women's Championship qualification
14	21 May 2018	Ato Boldon Stadium, Couva, Trinidad and Tobago	Dominica	3–0	3–0	2018 CONCACAF Women's Championship qualification
15	22 July 2018	Estadio Moderno Julio Torres, Barranquilla, Colombia	Nicaragua	2–0	2–2	2018 Central American and Caribbean Games
16	2 October 2019	Ato Boldon Stadium, Couva, Trinidad and Tobago	Antigua and Barbuda	2–0	5–0	2020 CONCACAF Women's Olympic Qualifying Championship qualification
17	2 October 2019	Ato Boldon Stadium, Couva, Trinidad and Tobago	Antigua and Barbuda	3–0	5–0	2020 CONCACAF Women's Olympic Qualifying Championship qualification
