= Jonelle Cato =

Trinidad and Tobago footballer

Personal information
- Date of birth: 14 March 1995 (age 31)
- Position: Defender

International career^{‡}
Years	Team	Apps	(Gls)
2014–	Trinidad and Tobago	23	(5)
- ‡ National team caps and goals as of 28 October 2025

Jonelle Cato (born 14 March 1995) is a Trinidad and Tobago footballer who plays as a defender for the Trinidad and Tobago women's national team.

== International career ==
Cato played for Trinidad and Tobago at senior level in the 2018 CFU Women's Challenge Series and the 2018 CONCACAF Women's Championship (including its qualification).

=== International goals ===
Scores and results list Trinidad and Tobago' goal tally first.

No.	Date	Venue	Opponent	Score	Result	Competition
1	25 April 2018	Ato Boldon Stadium, Couva, Trinidad and Tobago	Suriname	7–0	7–0	2018 CFU Women's Challenge Series
2	29 April 2018	Ato Boldon Stadium, Couva, Trinidad and Tobago	Guyana	3–1	3–1	2018 CFU Women's Challenge Series
3	27 May 2018	Ato Boldon Stadium, Couva, Trinidad and Tobago	Grenada	6–0	13–0	2018 CONCACAF Women's Championship qualification
4	27 May 2018	Ato Boldon Stadium, Couva, Trinidad and Tobago	Grenada	8–0	13–0	2018 CONCACAF Women's Championship qualification
5	7 October 2018	Sahlen's Stadium, Cary, United States	Mexico	1–1	1–4	2018 CONCACAF Women's Championship
