= Mariah Shade =

Association footballer

Personal information
- Full name: Mariah Shade
- Date of birth: 9 December 1991 (age 34)
- Place of birth: Trinidad and Tobago
- Height: 1.70 m (5 ft 7 in)
- Positions: Forward; midfielder

Youth career
- Debe High School

College career
Years	Team	Apps	(Gls)
2010	Martin Methodist RedHawks		
2011–2013	American International Yellow Jackets	49	(12)

International career^{‡}
2008	Trinidad and Tobago U17	3+	(3)
2007–2010	Trinidad and Tobago U20	6+	(13)
2007–2018	Trinidad and Tobago	43+	(21)
- ‡ National team caps and goals as of 11 October 2018

Mariah Shade (born 9 December 1991) is a Trinidadian footballer who plays as a defender. She has been a member of the Trinidad and Tobago women's national team.

== International goals ==
Scores and results list Trinidad and Tobago' goal tally first.

No.	Date	Venue	Opponent	Score	Result	Competition
1	2 October 2007	Dr. Ir. Franklin Essed Stadion, Paramaribo, Suriname	Saint Vincent and the Grenadines	6–0	9–0	2008 CONCACAF Women's Pre-Olympic Tournament qualification
2	4 October 2007	Dr. Ir. Franklin Essed Stadion, Paramaribo, Suriname	Grenada	4–0	6–0	2008 CONCACAF Women's Pre-Olympic Tournament qualification
3	10 May 2010	Marvin Lee Stadium, Macoya, Trinidad and Tobago	Saint Lucia	6–1	6–1	2010 CONCACAF Women's World Cup Qualifying qualification
4	20 August 2014	Hasely Crawford Stadium, Port of Spain, Trinidad and Tobago	Saint Kitts and Nevis	7–0	10–0	2014 CFU Women's Caribbean Cup
5	22 August 2014	Hasely Crawford Stadium, Port of Spain, Trinidad and Tobago	Antigua and Barbuda	1–0	3–0	2014 CFU Women's Caribbean Cup
6	22 August 2014	Hasely Crawford Stadium, Port of Spain, Trinidad and Tobago	Antigua and Barbuda	2–0	3–0	2014 CFU Women's Caribbean Cup
7	24 August 2014	Hasely Crawford Stadium, Port of Spain, Trinidad and Tobago	Martinique	5–0	7–0	2014 CFU Women's Caribbean Cup
8	24 August 2014	Hasely Crawford Stadium, Port of Spain, Trinidad and Tobago	Martinique	6–0	7–0	2014 CFU Women's Caribbean Cup
9	26 August 2014	Hasely Crawford Stadium, Port of Spain, Trinidad and Tobago	Jamaica	1–0	1–0	2014 CFU Women's Caribbean Cup
10	26 October 2014	PPL Park, Chester, United States	Mexico	2–1	2–4	2014 CONCACAF Women's Championship
11	11 July 2015	Hamilton Pan Am Soccer Stadium, Hamilton, Canada	Argentina	1–1	2–2	2015 Pan American Games
12	18 July 2015	Hamilton Pan Am Soccer Stadium, Hamilton, Canada	Mexico	1–2	1–3	2015 Pan American Games
13	16 February 2016	BBVA Compass Stadium, Houston, United States	Guyana	2–0	5–1	2016 CONCACAF Women's Olympic Qualifying Championship
14	25 April 2018	Ato Boldon Stadium, Couva, Trinidad and Tobago	Suriname	5–0	7–0	2018 CFU Women's Challenge Series
15	19 May 2018	Ato Boldon Stadium, Couva, Trinidad and Tobago	U.S. Virgin Islands	2–0	10–0	2018 CONCACAF Women's Championship qualification
16	19 May 2018	Ato Boldon Stadium, Couva, Trinidad and Tobago	U.S. Virgin Islands	5–0	10–0	2018 CONCACAF Women's Championship qualification
17	19 May 2018	Ato Boldon Stadium, Couva, Trinidad and Tobago	U.S. Virgin Islands	9–0	10–0	2018 CONCACAF Women's Championship qualification
18	19 May 2018	Ato Boldon Stadium, Couva, Trinidad and Tobago	U.S. Virgin Islands	10–0	10–0	2018 CONCACAF Women's Championship qualification
19	27 May 2018	Ato Boldon Stadium, Couva, Trinidad and Tobago	Grenada	3–0	13–0	2018 CONCACAF Women's Championship qualification
20	27 May 2018	Ato Boldon Stadium, Couva, Trinidad and Tobago	Grenada	10–0	13–0	2018 CONCACAF Women's Championship qualification
