= Shanelle Arjoon =

Trinidadian footballer

Personal information
- Full name: Summer Shanelle Arjoon
- Date of birth: 6 May 1997 (age 29)
- Place of birth: Duncan Village, Trinidad and Tobago
- Height: 1.63 m (5 ft 4 in)
- Positions: Forward; midfielder; left back

Youth career
- –2014: Debe Secondary School

College career
Years	Team	Apps	(Gls)
2015	Indian Hills Warriors		
2017–2019	West Texas A&M Buffaloes	51	(8)

Senior career*
Years	Team	Apps	(Gls)
2016	New York Magic	5	(0)

International career^{‡}
- Trinidad and Tobago U15
- Trinidad and Tobago U17
- Trinidad and Tobago U20
2014–2019	Trinidad and Tobago	15	(3)
- * Club domestic league appearances and goals ‡ National team caps and goals as of 11:03, April 18, 2026 (UTC)

Summer Shanelle Arjoon (born 6 May 1997), known as Shanelle Arjoon, is a Trinidadian footballer who plays as a forward for the Trinidad and Tobago women's national team.

== International career ==
Arjoon played for Trinidad and Tobago at senior level in the 2018 CFU Women's Challenge Series, the 2018 CONCACAF Women's Championship qualification and the 2020 CONCACAF Women's Olympic Qualifying Championship qualification.

=== International goals ===
Scores and results list Trinidad and Tobago' goal tally first.

No.	Date	Venue	Opponent	Score	Result	Competition
1	25 April 2018	Ato Boldon Stadium, Couva, Trinidad and Tobago	Suriname	1–0	7–0	2018 CFU Women's Challenge Series
2	25 April 2018	Ato Boldon Stadium, Couva, Trinidad and Tobago	Suriname	6–0	7–0	2018 CFU Women's Challenge Series
