= Liana Hinds =

Trinidadian footballer

Personal information
- Full name: Liana Kayla-Marie Hinds
- Date of birth: 23 February 1995 (age 31)
- Place of birth: Hartford, Connecticut, U.S.
- Height: 1.68 m (5 ft 6 in)
- Positions: Defender; midfielder; forward

College career
Years	Team	Apps	(Gls)
2012–2015	UConn Huskies	77	(3)

Senior career*
Years	Team	Apps	(Gls)
2016–2017	New England Mutiny	8	(1)
2018	Connecticut Fusion	4	(0)
2019	Sundsvalls DFF	11	(0)
2021–2022	ÍBV	15	(0)
2022–2023	Hibernian	24	(2)

International career^{‡}
2010–2012	Trinidad and Tobago U17	3+	(3+)
2014	Trinidad and Tobago U20		
2014–	Trinidad and Tobago	40	(3)
- * Club domestic league appearances and goals as of 22 February 2025 ‡ National team caps and goals as of 11:02, April 18, 2026 (UTC)

Liana Kayla-Marie Hinds (born 23 February 1995) is an American-born Trinidadian footballer who plays as a defender for the Trinidad and Tobago women's national team. She last played professionally for Hibernian.

== College career ==
Hinds attended the University of Connecticut.

== International career ==
Hinds represented Trinidad and Tobago at the 2010 FIFA U-17 Women's World Cup, the 2012 CONCACAF Women's U-17 Championship and the 2014 CONCACAF Women's U-20 Championship. She made her senior debut in 2014.

=== International goals ===
Scores and results list Trinidad and Tobago's goal tally first

No.	Date	Venue	Opponent	Score	Result	Competition
1	27 April 2018	Ato Boldon Stadium, Couva, Trinidad and Tobago	Grenada	3–1	8–1	2018 CFU Women's Challenge Series
2	20 July 2018	Estadio Moderno Julio Torres, Barranquilla, Colombia	Mexico	1–3	1–5	2018 Central American and Caribbean Games
