= Ayana Russell =

Trinidad and Tobago footballer

Personal information
- Full name: Ayana Christiana Russell
- Date of birth: 16 March 1988 (age 38)
- Place of birth: Trinidad and Tobago
- Position: Defender

Senior career*
Years	Team	Apps	(Gls)
- Malic FC
- QPCC Football

International career^{‡}
2010–2018	Trinidad and Tobago	26	(0)
- * Club domestic league appearances and goals ‡ National team caps and goals as of 10 October 2018

Ayana Christiana Russell (born 16 March 1988) is a Trinidad and Tobago footballer who plays as a defender. She has been a member of the Trinidad and Tobago women's national team.

== International career ==
Russell capped for Trinidad and Tobago at senior level during three CONCACAF Women's Championship editions (2010, 2014 and 2018), two Central American and Caribbean Games editions (2010 and 2018), the 2015 Pan American Games and the 2018 CFU Women's Challenge Series.
