= Barbados women's national football team =

Women's national association football team representing Barbados

Barbados
- Association: Barbados Football Association
- Confederation: CONCACAF (North America)
- Sub-confederation: CFU (Caribbean)
- Head coach: Kerry Trotman
- Top scorer: Rianna Cyrus (10)
- Home stadium: Barbados National Stadium
- FIFA code: BRB
First colours	Second colours

FIFA ranking
- Current: 163 (16 June 2026)
- Highest: 115 (June 2018)
- Lowest: 161 (December 2023)

First international
- Barbados 0–1 Antigua and Barbuda (Bridgetown, Barbados; 12 March 2006)

Biggest win
- Barbados 10–0 Turks and Caicos Islands (1 September 2017)

Biggest defeat
- El Salvador 13–0 Barbados (San Salvador, El Salvador; 1 March 2026)

The Barbados women's national football team is the national women's football team of Barbados and is overseen by the Barbados Football Association. It has never qualified for a major international tournament.

== Team image ==
=== Home stadium ===
The Barbados women's national team play their home matches on the Barbados National Stadium.

== Results and fixtures ==
The following is a list of match results in the last 12 months, as well as any future matches that have been scheduled.

Legend

Win Draw Lose Fixture

=== 2025 ===
1 December 2025 2025/2026 CONCACAF Qualifiers	Barbados	0-5	Trinidad and Tobago	Bridgetown, Barbados
		Report	Cordner 12'; Johnson 77'; Borneo 82'; Prince 83'; Lorall 90+5'	Stadium: Kensington Oval; Referee: Alyssa Pennington (USA)

== Coaching staff ==
=== Current coaching staff ===
Role	Name	Ref.

- Eric Alleyne (????-2025)
- (Barbados) Kerry Trotman (2025-present)

== Players ==
=== Current squad ===
- The following players were named to the squad to play the 2026 CONCACAF W Championship qualification games against Trinidad and Tobago on 1 December 2025.

Caps and goals accurate up to and including 18 October 2021.

No.	Pos.	Player	Date of birth (age)	Caps	Goals	Club
	GK	Lisa Harding	15 April 2005 (age 21)			(The Football Association) Merstham F.C.
	GK	Chioma Maycock			0	(Barbados Football Association) Empire
	GK	Unesty Waithe		0	0	(United States Soccer Federation) East Orange Campus High School
2	DF	Brittany Branker-White	28 November 2003 (age 22)	1	0	(Barbados Football Association) Paradise FC
14	DF	Keinelle Johnson	22 October 2003 (age 22)	5	2	(Barbados Football Association) Paradise FC
4	DF	Adrienne Forde	4 January 1998 (age 28)	2	0	(Barbados Football Association) Paradise FC
	DF	Taryn Sutherland	2 March 2009 (age 17)	0	0	(Barbados Football Association) RF Prime
	DF	Laea Blakeley		0	0	(United States Soccer Federation) Highland F.C.
	DF	Kay’ghun Rouse	24 January 2005 (age 21)	0	0	(Barbados Football Association) Paradise FC
	DF	Zhane Newsam		0	0	(Barbados Football Association) Technique FC
	DF	Gabrielle Birmingham		0	0	(Barbados Football Association) Mavericks Sports Club
9	MF	Ashanee Thompson	19 November 1996 (age 29)	5	1	(Barbados Football Association) Paradise FC
	MF	Shanice Stevenson (captain)				(Barbados Football Association) Paradise FC
11	MF	Makela Alleyne	28 November 2000 (age 25)	2	0	(Barbados Football Association) Mavericks Sports Club
6	MF	Daphne Watson-James	5 June 2004 (age 22)	2	0	(The Football Association) University of Essex
	MF	Tekoa Hope-Downes	22 February 2007 (age 19)		0	(Barbados Football Association) Paradise FC
	MF	Solange Holford	8 September 2008 (age 18)			(Barbados Football Association) Paradise FC
	MF	Amber De Silva				(Barbados Football Association) Empire
	MF	Marissa King	2 July 2001 (age 25)			(Barbados Football Association) RF Prime
	FW	Shakira Waithe	18 September 1995 (age 31)			(The Football Association) Enfield Town L.F.C.
17	FW	Acacia Small	16 February 2002 (age 24)	2	0	(Barbados Football Association) Paradise FC
	FW	Ketarrah Lowe-Millar				(Barbados Football Association) Empire
10	FW	Rianna Cyrus	29 November 1999 (age 26)	5	1	(Barbados Football Association) Paradise FC

=== Recent call-ups ===
The following players have been called up to the squad in the past 12 months.

Pos.	Player	Date of birth (age)	Caps	Goals	Club	Latest call-up

== Records ==
*Active players in bold, statistics correct as of 18 October 2021.

=== Most capped players ===
#	Player	Year(s)	Caps

=== Top goalscorers ===
#	Player	Year(s)	Goals	Caps
**1**	Rianna Cyrus		10	+11
**2**	Tianna Hackette		6	?

== Competitive record ==
=== FIFA Women's World Cup ===
FIFA Women's World Cup record
Year	Result	Pld	W	D*	L	GF	GA
(China) 1991 to (United States) 2003	Did not exist						
(China) 2007	Did not qualify						
(Germany) 2011	Did not qualify						
(Canada) 2015	Did not qualify						
(France) 2019	Did not qualify						
(Australia) (New Zealand) 2023	Did not qualify						
(Brazil) 2027	Did not qualify						
(Costa Rica) (Jamaica) (Mexico) (United States) 2031	To be determined						
(United Kingdom) 2035	To be determined						
Total	-	-	-	-	-	-	-

*Draws include knockout matches decided on penalty kicks.

=== Olympic Games ===
Summer Olympics record									Qualifying record					
Year	Round	Position	Pld	W	D*	L	GF	GA	Pld	W	D*	L	GF	GA
(United States) 1996 to (Greece) 2004	Did not exist								Did not exist					
(China) 2008	Did not enter								Did not enter					
(United Kingdom) 2012	Did not enter								Did not enter					
(Brazil) 2016	Did not enter								Did not enter					
(Japan) 2020	Did not qualify								4	2	0	2	8	15
(France) 2024	Did not qualify								2022 CONCACAF W Championship					
(United States) 2028	Did not qualify								2026 CONCACAF W Championship					
Total	-	-	-	-	-	-	-	-	4	2	0	2	8	15

*Draws include knockout matches decided on penalty kicks.

=== CONCACAF W Championship ===
CONCACAF W Championship record								Qualification record					
Year	Result	GP	W	D*	L	GF	GA	GP	W	D*	L	GF	GA
(Haiti) 1991 to (United States) (Canada) 2002	Did not exist							Did not exist					
(United States) 2006	Did not qualify							2	0	1	1	0	1
(Mexico) 2010	Did not qualify							5	3	0	2	11	11
(United States) 2014	Did not qualify							2014 Caribbean Cup					
(United States) 2018	Did not qualify							3	1	1	1	4	4
(Mexico) 2022	Did not qualify							4	1	0	3	3	11
(United States) 2026	Did not qualify							3	0	0	3	0	22
Total	-	-	-	-	-	-	-	17	5	2	10	18	49

*Draws include knockout matches decided on penalty kicks.

=== CONCACAF W Gold Cup ===
CONCACAF W Gold Cup record								Qualification record							
Year	Result	GP	W	D*	L	GF	GA	Division	Group	GP	W	D*	L	GF	GA
(United States) 2024	Did not qualify							B	C	6	1	1	4	11	19
(N/A) 2029	To be determined							To be determined							
Total	–	–	–	–	–	–	–	–	–	4	4	0	0	16	2

*Draws include knockout matches decided on penalty kicks.

=== CFU Women's Caribbean Cup ===
CFU Women's Caribbean Cup record
Year	Result	Pld	W	D*	L	GF	GA
(Haiti) 2000	Did not exist						
(Trinidad and Tobago) 2014	First round	2	0	0	2	1	4
(Jamaica) 2018	N/A	2	0	0	2	2	10
Total	First round	4	0	0	4	3	14

*Draws include knockout matches decided on penalty kicks.

== See also ==
- Barbados men's national football team
- Barbados Football Association
- Sport in Barbados
