= Saundra Baron =

Trinidadian footballer

Personal information
- Full name: Saundra Jacqueline Nneka Baron
- Date of birth: 20 July 1994 (age 32)
- Place of birth: Rochester, New York, United States
- Height: 1.73 m (5 ft 8 in)
- Position: Goalkeeper

College career
Years	Team	Apps	(Gls)
2011	Coastal Carolina Chanticleers	16	(0)
2013–2015	East Carolina Pirates	50	(0)

Senior career*
Years	Team	Apps	(Gls)
2019	Maccabi Kishronot Hadera	14	(1)

International career^{‡}
2008–2010	Trinidad and Tobago U17		
2015–2018	Trinidad and Tobago	11	(0)
- * Club domestic league appearances and goals as of 30 April 2019 ‡ National team caps and goals as of 10 October 2018

Saundra Jacqueline Nneka Baron (born 20 July 1994) is an American-born Trinidadian footballer who plays as a goalkeeper. She has been a member of the Trinidad and Tobago women's national team.

== Early life ==
Baron served as captain of the Trinidad and Tobago under-17 national women's soccer team from 2008 to 2010. She started in goal during the 2010 FIFA Under-17 Women's World Cup. Baron was named first-team all-state, all-area her junior season.

== College career ==
In 2011, Baron started 16 of 17 gamed in goal at Coastal Carolina. She recorded 55 saves on 198 shots faced (.625), which also ranked ninth the single season annuals. She allowed 33 goals posting a 2.01 goals against average.

In spring 2013, Baron transferred from Coastal Carolina to Eastern Carolina University. Baron started in all 21 games that season with five shutouts and a 1.19 GAA. Baron made five or more saves in nine different matches that season.

== International career ==
Baron made her senior debut for Trinidad and Tobago on 10 December 2015 in a 0–6 friendly loss against the United States.
