= Patrice Superville =

Trinidad and Tobago footballer

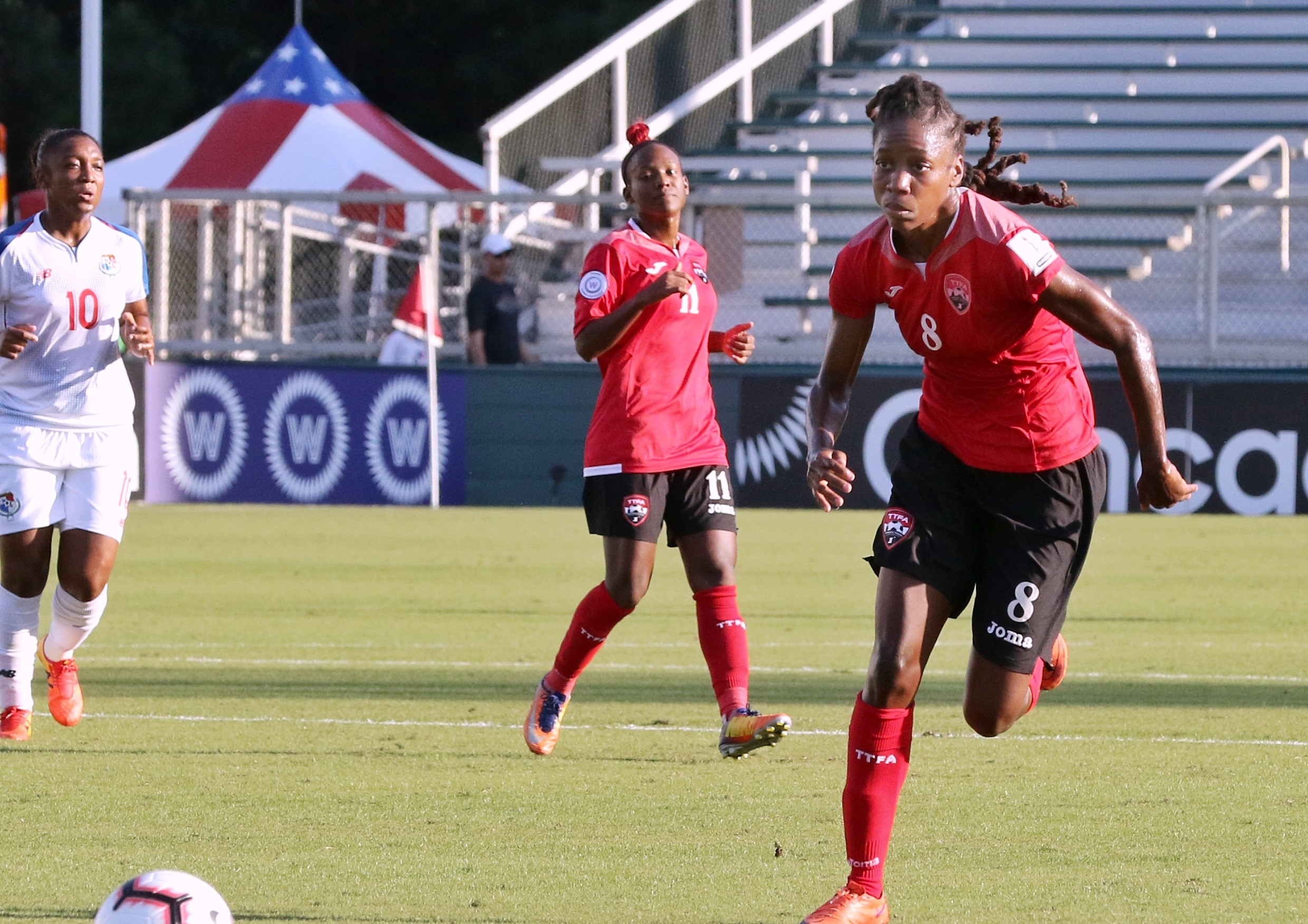

Personal information
- Date of birth: 8 April 1987 (age 39)
- Height: 1.73 m (5 ft 8 in)
- Position: Defender

College career
Years	Team	Apps	(Gls)
2006	Brewton–Parker Barons		

International career^{‡}
2010–2018	Trinidad and Tobago	43	(5)
- ‡ National team caps and goals as of 8 October 2019

Patrice Superville (born 8 April 1987) is a Trinidad and Tobago footballer who plays as a defender. She has been a member of the Trinidad and Tobago women's national team.

== International goals ==
Scores and results list Trinidad and Tobago' goal tally first.

No.	Date	Venue	Opponent	Score	Result	Competition
1	25 April 2018	Ato Boldon Stadium, Couva, Trinidad and Tobago	Suriname	3–0	7–0	2018 CFU Women's Challenge Series
2	19 May 2018	Ato Boldon Stadium, Couva, Trinidad and Tobago	U.S. Virgin Islands	1–0	10–0	2018 CONCACAF Women's Championship qualification
