= Rhea Belgrave =

Trinidad and Tobago footballer

Personal information
- Date of birth: 19 July 1991 (age 35)
- Height: 1.68 m (5 ft 6 in)
- Position: Defender

College career
Years	Team	Apps	(Gls)
2011	Concordia Clippers	15	(3)
2012–2014	West Texas A&M Buffaloes	46	(3)

International career^{‡}
2009	Trinidad and Tobago U20	3	(0)
2010–	Trinidad and Tobago	45	(3)
- ‡ National team caps and goals as of 12 July 2022

Rhea Belgrave (born 19 July 1991) is a Trinidadian footballer who plays as a defender for the Trinidad and Tobago women's national team.

== International goals ==
Scores and results list Trinidad and Tobago' goal tally first.

No.	Date	Venue	Opponent	Score	Result	Competition
1	2 November 2010	Estadio de Béisbol Beto Ávila, Cancún, Mexico	Guyana	2–0	4–1	2010 CONCACAF Women's World Cup Qualifying
2	21 May 2018	Ato Boldon Stadium, Couva, Trinidad and Tobago	Dominica	2–0	3–0	2018 CONCACAF Women's Championship qualification
