= Arin King =

Trinidad and Tobago footballer

Personal information
- Date of birth: 8 February 1991 (age 35)
- Place of birth: Scarborough, Ontario, Canada
- Height: 1.70 m (5 ft 7 in)
- Positions: Defender; striker

Youth career
- St. Mary Catholic Secondary School

College career
Years	Team	Apps	(Gls)
2009–2010	Toronto Varsity Blues		
2012	Centennial Colts		

Senior career*
Years	Team	Apps	(Gls)
2012	Neunkirch		

International career^{‡}
- Trinidad and Tobago U17
2010	Trinidad and Tobago U20	3	(0)
2010–2018	Trinidad and Tobago	48	(3)
- * Club domestic league appearances and goals ‡ National team caps and goals as of 10 October 2018

Arin King (born 8 February 1991) is a Canadian-born Trinidad and Tobago footballer who plays as a defender. She has been a member of the Trinidad and Tobago women's national team.

== International goals ==
Scores and results list Trinidad and Tobago' goal tally first.

No.	Date	Venue	Opponent	Score	Result	Competition
1	12 May 2010	Marvin Lee Stadium, Macoya, Trinidad and Tobago	Barbados	1–0	5–0	2010 CONCACAF Women's World Cup Qualifying qualification
2	12 May 2010	Marvin Lee Stadium, Macoya, Trinidad and Tobago	Barbados	2–0	5–0	2010 CONCACAF Women's World Cup Qualifying qualification
3	12 May 2010	Marvin Lee Stadium, Macoya, Trinidad and Tobago	Barbados	3–0	5–0	2010 CONCACAF Women's World Cup Qualifying qualification
