= Naomie Guerra =

Trinidadian footballer

Personal information
- Date of birth: 1 June 1996 (age 30)
- Place of birth: Arima, Trinidad and Tobago
- Height: 1.71 m (5 ft 7 in)
- Positions: Midfielder; defender

Team information
- Current team: Defence Force F.C. 2025

College career
Years	Team	Apps	(Gls)
2016–2017	William Carey Crusaders		
2018–2019	Wright State Raiders	26	(0)

International career^{‡}
- Trinidad and Tobago U15
2011–2012	Trinidad and Tobago U17	4	(1)
- Trinidad and Tobago U20
2015–	Trinidad and Tobago	24	(1)
- ‡ National team caps and goals as of 28 October 2025

Naomie Guerra (born 1 June 1996) is a Trinidadian footballer who plays as a midfielder for the Trinidad and Tobago women's national team.

== International goals ==
Scores and results list Trinidad and Tobago's goal tally first

No.	Date	Venue	Opponent	Score	Result	Competition
1	15 November 2015	Ato Boldon Stadium, Couva, Trinidad and Tobago	Saint Lucia	5–1	8–1	2016 CONCACAF Women's Olympic Qualifying Championship qualification
