= Trinidad and Tobago women's national football team =

Women's national football team representing Trinidad and Tobago

Trinidad and Tobago
- Nickname(s): (Women) Soca Warriors; Soca Princesses
- Association: Trinidad and Tobago Football Association
- Confederation: CONCACAF (North America, Central America and the Caribbean)
- Sub-confederation: CFU (Caribbean)
- Head coach: Damian Briggs
- Top scorer: Tasha St. Louis
- Home stadium: Hasely Crawford Stadium
- FIFA code: TRI
| First colours | Second colours |

FIFA ranking
- Current: 81 ▲1 (20 October 2026)
- Highest: 38 (June – October 2007)
- Lowest: 78 (December 2023)

First international
- Trinidad and Tobago 3–1 Mexico (Haiti; 20 April 1991)

Biggest win
- Trinidad and Tobago 13–0 Dominica (Trinidad and Tobago; 5 July 2002); Dominica 1–14 Trinidad and Tobago (San Cristóbal, Dominican Republic; 7 July 2011); Trinidad and Tobago 13–0 Grenada (Trinidad and Tobago; 27 May 2018); Turks and Caicos Islands 0–13 Trinidad and Tobago (Providenciales, Turks and Caicos Islands; 9 April 2022)

Biggest defeat
- United States 11–0 Trinidad and Tobago (Brazil; 23 June 2000); Brazil 11–0 Trinidad and Tobago (Brazil; 25 June 2000); Brazil 11–0 Trinidad and Tobago (Brazil; 9 December 2015)

CONCACAF Women's Championship
- Appearances: 9 (first in 1991)
- Best result: 3rd (1991)

The Trinidad and Tobago women's national football team is commonly known in their country as the Women Soca Warriors. They are one of the top women's national football teams in the Caribbean region along with Jamaica and Haiti.

Trinidad and Tobago women's national football team is currently coached by Damian Briggs and Densill Theobald. They replaced Angus Eve, under whom they had originally served as assistant coaches. Eve resigned on 19 October 2025, only 20 days after being appointed by the TTFA.

== Team image ==
=== Home stadium ===
The national team plays their home games generally in one of three stadium in the country. Games of significant importance are usually played at the Hasely Crawford Stadium. However, many World Cup qualification matches have been played at the Queen's Park Oval, a multipurpose, but primarily cricket, stadium. Low profile games, such as international friendlies against other islands in the Caribbean, are played at the Marvin Lee Stadium.

== Results and fixtures ==
The following is a list of match results in the last 12 months, as well as any future matches that have been scheduled.

Legend

Win Draw Lose Fixture

=== 2025 ===
| 28 October 2025 Friendly | Trinidad and Tobago | 1-4 | Jamaica | Couva, Trinidad and Tobago |
| | Gosine 13' | | Brown 11', 84'; Thomas 52'; Harris 84' | Stadium: Ato Boldon Stadium; Attendance: 535 |

| 1 December 2025 2025/2026 CONCACAF Qualifiers | Barbados | 0-5 | Trinidad and Tobago | Bridgetown, Barbados |
| | | Report | Cordner 12'; Johnson 77'; Borneo 82'; Prince 83'; Lorall 90+5' | Stadium: Kensington Oval; Referee: Alyssa Pennington (USA) |

| 4 March 2026 2025/2026 CONCACAF Qualifiers | Honduras | 2-2 | Trinidad and Tobago | Tegucigalpa, Honduras |
| | Reed 9', 21' | Report | Johnson 41' (pen.); Gosine 87' (pen.) | Stadium: Chelato Uclés National Stadium; Referee: Myriam Marcotte (CAN) |

== Coaching staff ==
=== Current coaching staff ===
As of 24 October 2025

| Position | Staff |
|---|---|
| Head coach | (Trinidad and Tobago) Damian Briggs |
| Assistant coach | (Trinidad and Tobago) Stefan Theophilus |
| Goalkeeper coach | Nigel Ling |
| Strength and conditioning Coach | Kwade Paul |
| Rehab Specialist | |
| Equipment Manager | Steve Fredericks |
| Team Manager | (Trinidad and Tobago) Maylee Attin-Johnson |
| Technical director | |

=== Managerial history ===
- (Trinidad and Tobago) Jamaal Shabazz (1998–2006)
- (Trinidad and Tobago) Marlon Charles (2006–2007)
- (Trinidad and Tobago) Jamaal Shabazz (2008–2010)
- (Trinidad and Tobago) Richard Hood (2011)
- (Trinidad and Tobago) Marlon Charles (2012–2014)
- (United States) Randy Waldrum (2014–2015)
- (Trinidad and Tobago) Ross Russell (2015)
- (Trinidad and Tobago) Anthony Creece (2015)
- (United States) Randy Waldrum (2015–2016)
- (Trinidad and Tobago) Richard Hood (2016)
- (Italy) Carolina Morace (2016–2017)
- (Trinidad and Tobago) Jamaal Shabazz (2017–2018)
- (Trinidad and Tobago) Anton Corneal (2018)
- (Trinidad and Tobago) Shawn Cooper (2018)
- (Trinidad and Tobago) Stephan De Four (2019)
- (Wales) James Thomas (2021)
- (Trinidad and Tobago) Kenwyne Jones (2021–2023)
- (Trinidad and Tobago) Richard Hood (2023–2024)
- (Trinidad and Tobago) Angus Eve (2025)
- (Trinidad and Tobago) Damian Briggs (2025–)

== Players ==
=== Current squad ===
The following players were called up for the 2026 CONCACAF W Championship qualification match against El Salvador on 17 April 2026.

Caps and goals correct as of 17 April 2026, after the match against El Salvador.

| No. | Pos. | Player | Date of birth (age) | Caps | Goals | Club |
|---|---|---|---|---|---|---|
| 1 | GK | Simone Eligon | 2 October 2000 (age 26) | 6 | 0 | (The Football Association) Chatham Town |
| 18 | GK | Malaika Dedier | 26 March 1999 (age 27) | 0 | 0 | (Trinidad and Tobago Football Association) UTT Patriots |
| 21 | GK | Akyla Walcott | 11 December 2002 (age 23) | 0 | 0 | (United States Soccer Federation) Wheeling Cardinals |
| 5 | DF | Cicely-Ann Spencer-Wickham | 30 July 2005 (age 21) | 1 | 0 | (United States Soccer Federation) Florida Atlantic Owls |
| 22 | DF | Kaitlyn Darwent | 19 September 2008 (age 18) | 4 | 0 | (Trinidad and Tobago Football Association) UTT Patriots |
| 15 | DF | Christa Waterman | | 5 | 0 | (United States Soccer Federation) Patuxent FA |
| 6 | DF | Victoria Swift | 29 January 1995 (age 31) | 28 | 0 | (Trinidad and Tobago Football Association) Club Sando |
| 3 | DF | Javanah Moreno | 27 June 1995 (age 31) | 1 | 0 | (Trinidad and Tobago Football Association) Club Sando |
| 12 | DF | Myla Schneider | 23 October 2003 (age 23) | 2 | 0 | (Portuguese Football Federation) SC Rio Tinto |
| 4 | DF | Emma Schneider | 14 June 2002 (age 24) | 2 | 0 | (Portuguese Football Federation) SC Rio Tinto |
| 2 | DF | Sakiah Williams | 6 December 2005 (age 20) | 0 | 0 | (United States Soccer Federation) Cal State San Bernardino Coyotes |
| 7 | MF | Liana Hinds | 23 February 1995 (age 31) | 40 | 3 | Unattached |
| 8 | MF | Elise Franco | 8 December 1998 (age 27) | 2 | 0 | (Football Australia) Brisbane City FC |
| 23 | MF | Asha James | 5 December 1999 (age 26) | 19 | 4 | (Trinidad and Tobago Football Association) AC Port of Spain |
| 14 | MF | Summer Arjoon | 6 May 1997 (age 29) | 15 | 3 | (Trinidad and Tobago Football Association) AC Port of Spain |
| 20 | MF | Sonia Lamarre | | 4 | 1 | (United States Soccer Federation) Seattle Redhawks |
| 11 | FW | Aaliyah Prince | 5 February 2001 (age 25) | 19 | 8 | (Trinidad and Tobago Football Association) Defence Force |
| 10 | FW | Alexcia Ali | 11 June 2000 (age 26) | 12 | 1 | (Trinidad and Tobago Football Association) Club Sando |
| 17 | FW | Ariana Borneo | 30 August 2007 (age 19) | 6 | 1 | (United States Soccer Federation) Ashland Eagles |
| 19 | FW | Kennya Cordner (captain) | 11 November 1988 (age 38) | 57+ | 48 | (Trinidad and Tobago Football Association) Club Sando |
| 9 | FW | Nikita Gosine | 9 December 2009 (age 16) | 4 | 2 | (Trinidad and Tobago Football Association) Point Fortin Pioneers |
| 13 | FW | Gabrielle Williams | 4 January 2002 (age 24) | 3 | 0 | (The Football Association) Sutton United |
| 16 | FW | Nia Hislop | 11 September 2003 (age 23) | 1 | 0 | (United States Soccer Federation) UMass Minutewomen |

=== Recent call-ups ===
The following players have been called up to a Trinidad and Tobago squad in the past 12 months.

| Pos. | Player | Date of birth (age) | Caps | Goals | Club | Latest call-up |
|---|---|---|---|---|---|---|
| GK | Keri Myers | 11 January 1994 (age 32) | 2 | 0 | (Trinidad and Tobago) Club Sando | v. Jamaica, 28 October 2025 |
| GK | Nicolette Craig | 12 October 1997 (age 29) | 3 | 0 | (Trinidad and Tobago) Defence Force | v. Jamaica, 28 October 2025 |
| GK | Tenesha Palmer | 12 May 1994 (age 32) | 12 | 0 | (Anguilla) Lil Soldiers FC | v. Barbados, 1 December 2025 |
| GK | Kimika Forbes | 28 August 1990 (age 36) | 59+ | 0 | (Trinidad and Tobago) Defence Force | v. Jamaica, 28 October 2025 ^{PRE} |
| DF | Kédie Johnson | 19 November 2000 (age 25) | 23 | 5 | (France) AS Saint-Étienne | v. Honduras, 4 March 2026 |
| DF | Chelcy Ralph | 15 December 1998 (age 27) | 15 | 2 | (Trinidad and Tobago) Club Sando | v. Jamaica, 28 October 2025 |
| DF | Jade Beekai | 3 February 2005 (age 21) | 0 | 0 | (Trinidad and Tobago) Defence Force | v. Jamaica, 28 October 2025 |
| DF | Shaunalee Govia | 2 November 1998 (age 28) | 7 | 1 | (Trinidad and Tobago) Defence Force | v. Barbados, 1 December 2025 |
| DF | Karyn Forbes | 27 August 1991 (age 35) | 72+ | 20 | (Trinidad and Tobago) Club Sando | v. Jamaica, 28 October 2025 |
| DF | Tamara Smart | | 1 | 0 | (Trinidad and Tobago) Defence Force | v. Jamaica, 28 October 2025 |
| DF | Rhea Belgrave | 19 July 1991 (age 35) | 45 | 3 | (Trinidad and Tobago) Club Sando | v. Jamaica, 28 October 2025 ^{PRE} |
| DF | Tsai-Anne Fernandez | 7 October 2000 (age 26) | 0 | 0 | (Trinidad and Tobago) Defence Force | v. Jamaica, 28 October 2025 ^{PRE} |
| DF | Kanika Rodriguez | 5 February 2008 (age 18) | 4 | 0 | (Trinidad and Tobago) UTT Patriots | v. Barbados, 1 December 2025 |
| MF | Natalia Gosine | | 0 | 0 | (Trinidad and Tobago) Point Fortin Pioneers | v. Honduras, 4 March 2026 |
| MF | Chrissy Mitchell | 17 January 2002 (age 24) | 7 | 0 | (Trinidad and Tobago) Point Fortin Pioneers | v. Honduras, 4 March 2026 |
| MF | Ty’Kaiya Dennis | 23 July 2008 (age 18) | 0 | 0 | (Trinidad and Tobago) Jewels SC Tobago | v. Honduras, 4 March 2026 |
| MF | Lorall Romain | 12 March 1998 (age 28) | 1 | 1 | (Panama) Santa Fé FC | v. Honduras, 4 March 2026 |
| MF | Shenieka Paul | 22 August 2002 (age 24) | 5 | 1 | (Trinidad and Tobago) Defence Force | v. Jamaica, 28 October 2025 |
| MF | Maria-Frances Serrant | 14 November 2002 (age 24) | 14 | 2 | (Saudi Arabia) Neom SC | v. Barbados, 1 December 2025 |
| MF | Tori Paul | 22 August 2002 (age 24) | 11 | 1 | (United States) Patuxent FA | v. Jamaica, 28 October 2025 |
| MF | Naomie Guerra | 1 June 1996 (age 30) | 24 | 1 | (Trinidad and Tobago) Club Sando | v. Jamaica, 28 October 2025 |
| MF | Sheneil Findley | 15 October 2006 (age 20) | 0 | 0 | (Trinidad and Tobago) UTT Patriots | v. Barbados, 1 December 2025 |
| MF | Shurella Mendez | 4 November 2003 (age 23) | 1 | 0 | (Trinidad and Tobago) Defence Force | v. Jamaica, 28 October 2025 |
| MF | Cherina Steele | 7 February 2008 (age 18) | 3 | 1 | (Trinidad and Tobago) UTT Patriots | v. Jamaica, 28 October 2025 ^{PRE} |
| MF | Orielle Martin | 1 October 2008 (age 18) | 6 | 0 | (Trinidad and Tobago) Club Sando | v. Barbados, 1 December 2025 ^{INJ} |
| MF | Mariah Williams | 24 November 2007 (age 18) | 0 | 0 | (Trinidad and Tobago) UTT Patriots | v. Jamaica, 28 October 2025 ^{PRE} |
| MF | Nathifa Hackshaw | 23 May 2001 (age 25) | 0 | 0 | (Trinidad and Tobago) Defence Force | v. Jamaica, 28 October 2025 ^{PRE} |
| MF | Renee Mike | | 0 | 0 | (Trinidad and Tobago) Defence Force | v. Jamaica, 28 October 2025 ^{PRE} |
| FW | Afiyah Cornwall | 10 April 2002 (age 24) | 4 | 1 | (Trinidad and Tobago) Club Sando | v. Jamaica, 28 October 2025 |
| FW | Tyeisha Griffith | | 1 | 0 | (Trinidad and Tobago) UTT Patriots | v. Jamaica, 28 October 2025 |
| FW | Rasheda Archer | 2 April 2008 (age 18) | 1 | 0 | (Trinidad and Tobago) Club Sando | v. Jamaica, 28 October 2025 ^{PRE} |
| FW | Dennecia Kayla Prince | 10 August 1998 (age 28) | 10 | 1 | (Trinidad and Tobago) Defence Force | v. Jamaica, 28 October 2025 ^{PRE} |
| FW | Sydney Pollard | | 0 | 0 | (Trinidad and Tobago) Pro Series FC | v. Jamaica, 28 October 2025 ^{PRE} |
| FW | J'Eleisha Alexander | 16 October 2007 (age 19) | 1 | 0 | (Trinidad and Tobago) Tobago Chicas | v. Jamaica, 28 October 2025 ^{PRE} |
^{DCL} Player refused to join the team after the call-up.^{INJ} Player withdrew from the squad due to an injury.^{PRE} Preliminary squad.^{RET} Player has retired from international football.^{SUS} Suspended from the national team.

=== Team captains ===
| Tenure | Incumbent | Reserve captains |
|---|---|---|
| 2006–2016 | Maylee Attin-Johnson | Tasha St. Louis (2006), Ayana Russell (2007, 2014, 2015), Kennya Cordner (2011), Arin King (2015) |
| 2017–2018 | Tasha St. Louis | Arin King (2018) |
| 2018–2023 | Karyn Forbes | |
| 2024 | Victoria Swift | |
| 2025– | Kennya Cordner | |

== Records ==
As of 18 April 2026

Players in bold are still active, at least at club level.

Most Caps
| # | Player | Caps | Goals | Career |
|---|---|---|---|---|
| 1 | Karyn Forbes | 72+ | 20 | 2010–2023 |
| 2 | Tasha St. Louis | 67+ | 46 | 2002–2018 |
| 3 | **Kimika Forbes** | 59+ | 0 | 2006– |
| 4 | **Kennya Cordner** | 57+ | 48 | 2006– |
| 5 | Janine François | 51+ | 7 | 2010–2019 |
| 6 | Maylee Attin-Johnson | 48+ | 17 | 2002–2021 |
| 6 | Arin King | 48+ | 3 | 2010–2018 |
| 8 | **Rhea Belgrave** | 45+ | 3 | 2010– |
| 9 | Mariah Shade | 43+ | 21 | 2007–2018 |
| 9 | Patrice Superville | 43+ | 5 | 2010–2018 |

Top Goalscorers
| # | Player | Goals | Caps | Career |
|---|---|---|---|---|
| 1 | **Kennya Cordner** | 48 | 56+ | 2006– |
| 2 | Tasha St. Louis | 46 | 67+ | 2002–2018 |
| 3 | Mariah Shade | 21 | 43+ | 2007–2018 |
| 4 | Karyn Forbes | 20 | 72+ | 2010–2023 |
| 5 | Maylee Attin-Johnson | 17 | 48+ | 2002–2021 |
| 6 | Ahkeela Mollon | 16 | 39+ | 2002–2016 |
| 7 | Natalie Des Vignes | 11 | 8+ | ?–2004 |
| 8 | **Aaliyah Prince** | 8 | 19 | 2018– |
| 9 | Janine François | 7 | 51+ | 2010–2019 |
| 9 | Alania Burgin | 7 | 8+ | ?–2007 |
| 9 | Kayla Taylor | 7 | 8+ | 2016–2018 |

== Competitive record ==
=== FIFA Women's World Cup ===
FIFA Women's World Cup record
| Year | Result | GP | W | D* | L | GF | GA | GD |
|---|---|---|---|---|---|---|---|---|
| (China) 1991 | Did not qualify | | | | | | | |
| (Sweden) 1995 | Did not qualify | | | | | | | |
| (United States) 1999 | Did not qualify | | | | | | | |
| (United States) 2003 | Did not qualify | | | | | | | |
| (China) 2007 | Did not qualify | | | | | | | |
| (Germany) 2011 | Did not qualify | | | | | | | |
| (Canada) 2015 | Did not qualify | | | | | | | |
| (France) 2019 | Did not qualify | | | | | | | |
| (Australia) (New Zealand) 2023 | Did not qualify | | | | | | | |
| (Brazil) 2027 | Did not qualify | | | | | | | |
| (Costa Rica) (Jamaica) (Mexico) (United States) 2031 | To be determined | | | | | | | |
| (United Kingdom) 2035 | To be determined | | | | | | | |
| Total | – | – | – | – | – | – | – | – |

*Draws include knockout matches decided on penalty kicks.

=== Olympic Games ===
| Summer Olympics record | | | | | | | | | Qualifying record | | | | | |
| Year | Round | Position | Pld | W | D* | L | GF | GA | Pld | W | D* | L | GF | GA |
|---|---|---|---|---|---|---|---|---|---|---|---|---|---|---|
| (United States) 1996 | Did not qualify | | | | | | | | 1995 FIFA WWC | | | | | |
| (Australia) 2000 | Did not qualify | | | | | | | | 1999 FIFA WWC | | | | | |
| (Greece) 2004 | Did not qualify | | | | | | | | 5 | 3 | 0 | 2 | 13 | 19 |
| (China) 2008 | Did not qualify | | | | | | | | 7 | 4 | 1 | 2 | 23 | 11 |
| (United Kingdom) 2012 | Did not qualify | | | | | | | | 3 | 2 | 0 | 1 | 19 | 3 |
| (Brazil) 2016 | Did not qualify | | | | | | | | 8 | 6 | 0 | 2 | 24 | 15 |
| (Japan) 2020 | Did not qualify | | | | | | | | 4 | 2 | 1 | 1 | 9 | 4 |
| (France) 2024 | Did not qualify | | | | | | | | 2022 CONCACAF W Championship | | | | | |
| (United States) 2028 | Did not qualify | | | | | | | | 2026 CONCACAF W Championship | | | | | |
| Total | – | – | – | – | – | – | – | – | 27 | 17 | 2 | 8 | 88 | 52 |

*Draws include knockout matches decided on penalty kicks.

=== CONCACAF W Championship ===
Trinidad and Tobago are the only nation to appear in every CONCACAF Women's Championship.

| CONCACAF W Championship record | | | | | | | | | Qualification record | | | | | | |
| Year | Result | GP | W | D* | L | GF | GA | GD | GP | W | D* | L | GF | GA | GD |
| (Haiti) 1991 | Third Place | 5 | 2 | 1 | 2 | 8 | 20 | −12 | – | | | | | | |
| (United States) 1993 | Fourth Place | 3 | 0 | 0 | 3 | 0 | 20 | −20 | – | | | | | | |
| (Canada) 1994 | Fourth Place | 4 | 1 | 1 | 2 | 6 | 20 | −14 | – | | | | | | |
| (Canada) 1998 | Group Stage | 3 | 1 | 1 | 1 | 5 | 6 | −1 | 2 | 2 | 0 | 0 | 15 | 1 | +14 |
| (United States) 2000 | Group Stage | 3 | 0 | 1 | 2 | 2 | 24 | −22 | – | | | | | | |
| (Canada) (United States) 2002 | Group Stage | 3 | 0 | 0 | 3 | 2 | 9 | −7 | 4 | 4 | 0 | 0 | 27 | 2 | +25 |
| (United States) 2006 | First round | 1 | 0 | 0 | 1 | 0 | 3 | −3 | 5 | 5 | 0 | 0 | 32 | 2 | +30 |
| (Mexico) 2010 | Group Stage | 3 | 1 | 0 | 2 | 4 | 4 | 0 | 3 | 3 | 0 | 0 | 14 | 1 | +13 |
| (United States) 2014 | Fourth Place | 5 | 2 | 1 | 2 | 6 | 7 | −1 | 2014 Caribbean Cup | | | | | | |
| (United States) 2018 | Group Stage | 3 | 0 | 0 | 3 | 1 | 14 | −13 | 8 | 6 | 1 | 1 | 39 | 7 | +32 |
| (Mexico) 2022 | Group Stage | 3 | 0 | 0 | 3 | 0 | 11 | −11 | 4 | 3 | 1 | 0 | 19 | 3 | +16 |
| (United States) 2026 | Did not qualify | | | | | | | | 3 | 1 | 1 | 1 | 7 | 4 | +3 |
| Total | Third Place | 36 | 7 | 5 | 24 | 34 | 138 | −104 | 30 | 25 | 3 | 2 | 158 | 20 | +138 |

*Draws include knockout matches decided on penalty kicks.

=== CONCACAF W Gold Cup ===
| CONCACAF W Gold Cup record | | | | | | | | Qualification record | | | | | | | |
| Year | Result | GP | W | D* | L | GF | GA | Division | Group | GP | W | D* | L | GF | GA |
|---|---|---|---|---|---|---|---|---|---|---|---|---|---|---|---|
| (United States) 2024 | Did not qualify | | | | | | | A | A | 4 | 0 | 1 | 3 | 1 | 9 |
| (N/A) 2029 | To be determined | | | | | | | To be determined | | | | | | | |
| Total | – | – | – | – | – | – | – | – | – | 4 | 0 | 1 | 3 | 1 | 9 |

*Draws include knockout matches decided on penalty kicks.

=== Pan American Games ===
Pan American Games record
| Year | Result | Pld | W | D* | L | GF | GA |
|---|---|---|---|---|---|---|---|
| (Canada) 1999 | Group Stage | 4 | 0 | 0 | 4 | 3 | 23 |
| (Dominican Republic) 2003 | Did not enter | | | | | | |
| (Brazil) 2007 | Did not enter | | | | | | |
| (Mexico) 2011 | Group Stage | 3 | 0 | 1 | 2 | 1 | 5 |
| (Canada) 2015 | Group Stage | 3 | 0 | 2 | 1 | 4 | 6 |
| (Peru) 2019 | Did not qualify | | | | | | |
| (Chile) 2023 | Did not qualify | | | | | | |
| (Peru) 2027 | To be determined | | | | | | |
| Total | Group Stage | 10 | 0 | 3 | 7 | 8 | 34 |

*Draws include knockout matches decided on penalty kicks.

=== Central American and Caribbean Games ===
Central American and Caribbean Games record
| Year | Result | Pld | W | D* | L | GF | GA |
|---|---|---|---|---|---|---|---|
| (Puerto Rico) 2010 | Silver Medal | 5 | 3 | 0 | 2 | 10 | 6 |
| (Mexico) 2014 | Group Stage | 3 | 0 | 1 | 2 | 1 | 14 |
| (Colombia) 2018 | Fourth Place | 5 | 1 | 1 | 3 | 6 | 10 |
| (El Salvador) 2023 | Did not qualify | | | | | | |
| (Dominican Republic) 2026 | To be determined | | | | | | |
| Total | Silver Medal | 13 | 4 | 2 | 7 | 17 | 30 |

*Draws include knockout matches decided on penalty kicks.

=== CFU Women's Caribbean Cup ===
CFU Women's Caribbean Cup record
| Year | Result | Pld | W | D* | L | GF | GA |
|---|---|---|---|---|---|---|---|
| (Haiti) 2000 | Did not enter | | | | | | |
| (Trinidad and Tobago) 2014 | Champions | 4 | 4 | 0 | 0 | 21 | 0 |
| (Saint Kitts and Nevis) (Jamaica) (Haiti) (Antigua and Barbuda) (Trinidad and Tobago) 2018 | Group winner | 3 | 3 | 0 | 0 | 18 | 2 |
| Total | Champions | 7 | 7 | 0 | 0 | 39 | 2 |

*Draws include knockout matches decided on penalty kicks.

=== Other tournaments ===
==== Torneio Internacional de Futebol Feminino ====
(Brazil) Torneio Internacional de Futebol Feminino record
| Year | Result | Position | Matches | Wins | Draws | Losses | GF | GA |
|---|---|---|---|---|---|---|---|---|
| (Brazil) 2015 | Fourth place | 4th | 4 | 0 | 0 | 4 | 1 | 20 |
| Total | 1/1 | 0 titles | 4 | 0 | 0 | 4 | 1 | 20 |

== Honours ==
=== Major competitions ===
- CONCACAF W Championship

Third place (1): 1991

=== Regional ===
- Central American and Caribbean Games

Silver Medalists (1): 2010

- CFU Women's Caribbean Cup

Champions (1): 2014

== See also ==
- Sport in Trinidad and Tobago
  - Football in Trinidad and Tobago
    - Women's football in Trinidad and Tobago
- Trinidad and Tobago women's national under-20 football team
- Trinidad and Tobago women's national under-17 football team
- Trinidad and Tobago men's national football team
