= Christina Murillo =

Mexican footballer (born 1993)

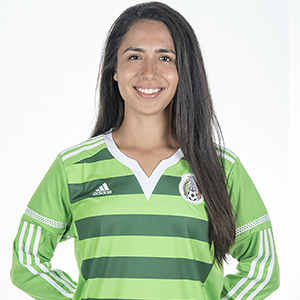
- Murillo with Mexico in 2015

Personal information
- Full name: Christina Murillo Ruiz
- Date of birth: 28 January 1993 (age 33)
- Place of birth: Ventura, California, United States
- Height: 1.72 m (5 ft 8 in)
- Position: Center back

Youth career
- Nordhoff

College career
Years	Team	Apps	(Gls)
2011–2015	Michigan Wolverines	82	(2)

Senior career*
Years	Team	Apps	(Gls)
2016–2017	Motor City FC	9	(0)
2017	Gintra Universitetas	6	(0)
2018	Chicago Red Stars	0	(0)

International career^{‡}
2010	Mexico U17		
2012	Mexico U20		
2011–2018	Mexico	46	(1)
- * Club domestic league appearances and goals ‡ National team caps and goals as of 19 April 2022

Christina Murillo Ruiz (born 28 January 1993) is a former footballer who played as a center back. Born in the United States, she represented the Mexico at senior level, earning 46 caps and appearing at the 2015 FIFA Women's World Cup. After retiring, Murillo joined Chicago Fire FC’s staff and later served as a draw assistant for the 2022 Concacaf W Championship draw.

== College career ==
Murillo was a four-year starter at the University of Michigan where she played as a midfielder and center back. She did not play in 2014, choosing instead to train full-time with the Mexican national team ahead of the 2015 FIFA Women's World Cup. As a senior she captained the Wolverines, made the All-Big Ten First Team, and tied the program record for most assists in a single game. She finished with 82 appearances and two goals for Michigan.

== Club career ==
Murillo signed for the WPSL team Motor City FC in April 2016. In August 2017, she joined Lithuanian club Gintra Universitetas and competed in the UEFA Women's Champions League, making six appearances and scoring zero goals in the 2017–18 campaign. She later signed with the Chicago Red Stars in the NWSL in 2018 before retiring from playing in 2019.

== International career ==
Murillo represented Mexico between 2011 and 2018, including two appearances at the 2015 FIFA Women's World Cup. At youth level she played at the 2010 FIFA U-17 Women's World Cup in Trinidad and Tobago and the 2012 FIFA U-20 Women's World Cup in Japan.

== Post-playing career ==
Murillo joined Chicago Fire FC in 2018 as a community ambassador and later became the Club’s Head of Pre-Formation Phase and Community Outreach. In April 2022 she served as a draw assistant for the Concacaf W Championship draw, a live television event dividing the eight participating teams into two groups. In October 2022, Murillo was also named a U.S. Department of State Sports Envoy for a girls’ soccer program in Montenegro.

== Personal life ==
Murillo's husband is Richard Sánchez, also a footballer who, like her, was born in the United States but has represented Mexico internationally. He has played for Hartford Athletic.
