= Toriana Patterson =

Jamaican footballer (born 1994)

Personal information
- Date of birth: 2 February 1994 (age 32)
- Place of birth: Bronx, New York, United States
- Height: 1.72 m (5 ft 8 in)
- Position: Midfielder

College career
Years	Team	Apps	(Gls)
2012–2013	Georgia Bulldogs	18	(0)
2014–2016	UConn Huskies	64	(1)

Senior career*
Years	Team	Apps	(Gls)
2016	Kansas City FC		(0)
2017	Gintra Universitetas	3	(0)
2018–2019	Pink Sport Bari	12	(0)

International career^{‡}
2011–2012	Jamaica U20	8	(0)
2018–2019	Jamaica	15	(0)
Medal record
Representing Jamaica
CONCACAF W Championship
Third place	2018 United States
- * Club domestic league appearances and goals ‡ National team caps and goals as of 8 October 2018

Toriana Patterson (born 2 February 1994) is an American-born Jamaican former footballer who played as a midfielder.

== Career ==
=== Club ===
In 2018, Patterson signed for Italian Serie A side Pink Bari.

=== International ===
Patterson has represented Jamaica since 2014.
