= Rachel Peláez =

Cuban footballer

Personal information
- Full name: Rachel Peláez Ellis
- Date of birth: 5 May 1993 (age 33)
- Place of birth: Cuba
- Position: Midfielder

International career^{‡}
Years	Team	Apps	(Gls)
2009–2012	Cuba U20	11	(11)
2010–	Cuba	11	(1)
- ‡ National team caps and goals as of 20:43, 18 March 2015 (UTC)

Rachel Peláez Ellis (born 5 May 1993) is a Cuban international footballer who plays as a midfielder.
