= Grenada women's national football team =

Women's national association football team representing Grenada

Grenada
- Nickname: Spice Girlz
- Association: Grenada Football Association
- Confederation: CONCACAF
- Head coach: Jake Rennie
- FIFA code: GRN
First colours	Second colours

FIFA ranking
- Current: 172 (16 June 2026)
- Highest: 89 (September 2006)
- Lowest: 172 (August 2025)

First international
- Trinidad and Tobago 10–0 Grenada (Arima, Trinidad and Tobago; 19 May 2006)

Biggest win
- Bahamas 1–6 Grenada (Nassau, Bahamas; 20 September 2023)

Biggest defeat
- Haiti 13–0 Grenada (Bayamón, Puerto Rico; 23 August 2015); Trinidad and Tobago 13–0 Grenada (Couva, Trinidad and Tobago; 27 May 2018)

The Grenada women's national football team is the national women's football team of Grenada and is overseen by the Grenada Football Association.

== Results and fixtures ==
The following is a list of match results in the last 12 months, as well as any future matches that have been scheduled.

Legend

Win Draw Lose Fixture

=== 2025 ===
29 November 2026 CONCACAF W Championship Q	Grenada	1-2	Costa Rica	St. George's, Grenada
19:30	Bedeau 32'	Report (FIFA); Report (CONCACAF)	Chinchilla 45+2', 61'	Stadium: Kirani James Athletic Stadium; Referee: Janeishka Caban (Puerto Rico)

== Players ==
=== Current squad ===
- The following players are named in the squad for the 2026 CONCACAF W Championship qualification matches against Costa Rica on 29 November 2025.

No.	Pos.	Player	Date of birth (age)	Caps	Goals	Club
	GK	Kinda Lambert	11 January 2001 (age 25)			(Grenada Football Association) Queens Park Rangers
	GK	Resheda Charles	10 April 2001 (age 25)			(Grenada Football Association) St. John's SC
	GK	Rashida Herry	11 October 1991 (age 34)			(Grenada Football Association) Paradise
	DF	Rachael Noel	24 November 2004 (age 21)			(United States Soccer Federation) Lincoln Blue Tigers
	DF	Carena Noel	25 September 1994 (age 32)			(Grenada Football Association) Paradise
	DF	Keldonna Jeffery	4 August 2002 (age 24)			(United States Soccer Federation) UMFK Bengals
	DF	Judy McIntosh	30 October 2000 (age 25)			(United States Soccer Federation) UNOH Racers
	DF	Malia Ramdhanny	27 December 2002 (age 23)			(United States Soccer Federation) Western Colorado Mountaineers
	DF	Naomi Bedeau (captain)	24 November 2000 (age 25)			(The Football Association) Oxford United W.F.C.
	DF	Erin Sylvester	11 December 2002 (age 23)			(United States Soccer Federation) Union Bulldogs
	MF	Karlette Daniel	17 July 2004 (age 22)			(Grenada Football Association) Paradise
	MF	Sheranda Charles	7 May 2002 (age 24)			(United States Soccer Federation) SMU Saints
	MF	Alicia Banfield	13 January 2010 (age 16)			(Canadian Soccer Association) Bill Crothers Secondary School
	MF	Melania Fullerton	11 March 2005 (age 21)			(United States Soccer Federation) Vanderbilt Commodores
	MF	Cara Bisasor	24 November 2010 (age 15)			(Canadian Soccer Association) St. Thomas More
	MF	Amelia Bubb	7 October 2006 (age 20)			(United States Soccer Federation) Co-Lin Wolves
	FW	Ronniellia Bubb	31 August 2003 (age 23)			(Grenada Football Association) Paradise
	FW	Nia Fleming-Thompson	15 February 2004 (age 22)			(Canadian Soccer Association) York Lions
	FW	Roneisha Frank	9 September 1997 (age 29)			(Grenada Football Association) Queens Park Rangers
	FW	Abigail Williams	19 June 2007 (age 19)			(Grenada Football Association) Queens Park Rangers
	FW	Johnella George				(Grenada Football Association) Paradise
	FW	Cassima Langaigne	26 July 2006 (age 20)			(Grenada Football Association) Eagles Super Strikers FC
	FW	Kimel Robertson	24 January 2004 (age 22)			(United States Soccer Federation) Union Bulldogs
	FW	Raquelle Mitchell				(United States Soccer Federation) Southern Miss Lady Eagles

=== Recent call ups ===
Pos.	Player	Date of birth (age)	Caps	Goals	Club	Latest call-up

== Competitive record ==
=== FIFA Women's World Cup ===
FIFA Women's World Cup record
Year	Result	Pld	W	D*	L	GF	GA
(China) 1991 to (United States) 2003	Did not enter						
(China) 2007	Did not qualify						
(Germany) 2011	Did not qualify						
(Canada) 2015	Did not enter						
(France) 2019	Did not qualify						
(Australia) (New Zealand) 2023	Did not qualify						
(Brazil) 2027	Did not qualify						
(Costa Rica) (Jamaica) (Mexico) (United States) 2031	To be determined						
(United Kingdom) 2035	To be determined						
Total	–	–	–	–	–	–	–

*Draws include knockout matches decided on penalty kicks.

=== Olympic Games ===
Summer Olympics record									Qualifying record					
Year	Round	Position	Pld	W	D*	L	GF	GA	Pld	W	D*	L	GF	GA
(United States) 1996 to (Greece) 2004	Did not enter								Did not enter					
(China) 2008	Did not qualify								3	1	0	2	4	14
(United Kingdom) 2012	Did not enter								Did not enter					
(Brazil) 2016	Did not qualify								3	1	0	2	2	25
(Japan) 2020	Withdrew								Withdrew					
(France) 2024	Did not qualify								2022 CONCACAF W Championship					
(United States) 2028	Did not qualify								2026 CONCACAF W Championship					
Total	–	–	–	–	–	–	–	–	10	2	0	8	7	62

*Draws include knockout matches decided on penalty kicks.

=== CONCACAF W Championship ===
CONCACAF W Championship record								Qualification record					
Year	Result	GP	W	D*	L	GF	GA	GP	W	D*	L	GF	GA
(Haiti) 1991 to (United States) (Canada) 2002	Did not enter							Did not enter					
(United States) 2006	Did not qualify							3	0	1	2	2	17
(Mexico) 2010	Did not qualify							2	0	0	2	0	6
(United States) 2014	Did not enter							2014 Caribbean Cup					
(United States) 2018	Did not qualify							4	0	1	3	1	27
(Mexico) 2022	Did not qualify							4	0	0	4	1	23
(United States) 2026	Did not qualify							4	1	0	3	7	14
Total	–	–	–	–	–	–	–	17	1	2	14	11	83

*Draws include knockout matches decided on penalty kicks.

=== CONCACAF W Gold Cup ===
CONCACAF W Gold Cup record								Qualification record							
Year	Result	GP	W	D*	L	GF	GA	Division	Group	GP	W	D*	L	GF	GA
(United States) 2024	Did not qualify							C	C	4	4	0	0	16	2
(N/A) 2029	To be determined							To be determined							
Total	–	–	–	–	–	–	–	–	–	4	4	0	0	16	2

*Draws include knockout matches decided on penalty kicks.

=== CFU Women's Caribbean Cup ===
CFU Women's Caribbean Cup record
Year	Result	Pld	W	D*	L	GF	GA
(Haiti) 2000	Did not enter						
(Trinidad and Tobago) 2014	Did not enter						
(Trinidad and Tobago) 2018	N/A	3	0	1	2	6	14
Total	–	3	0	1	2	6	14

*Draws include knockout matches decided on penalty kicks.
