= Ato Boldon Stadium =

Stadium in Trinidad and Tobago

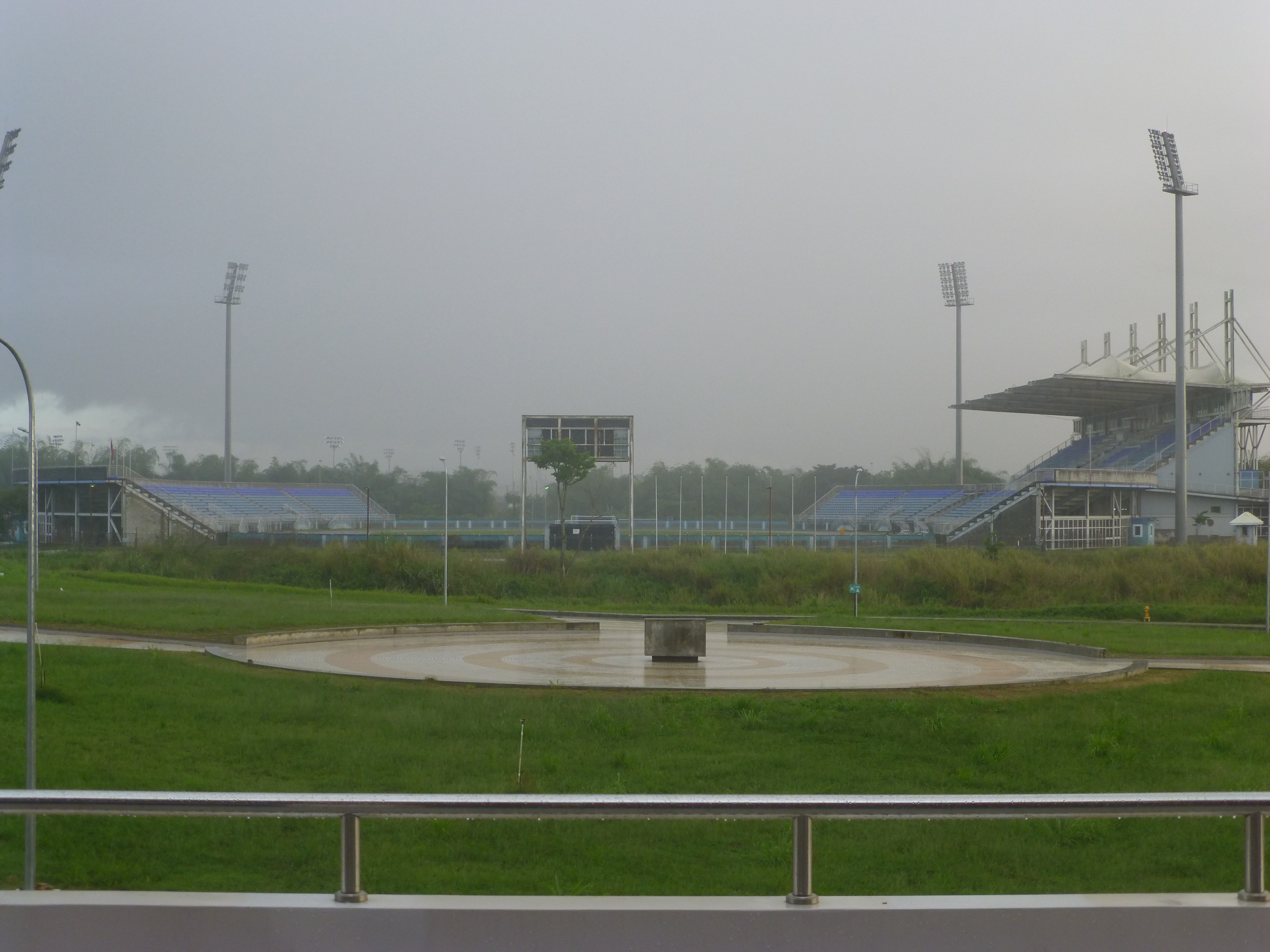
- Interactive map of Ato Boldon Stadium
- Location: Couva, Trinidad and Tobago
- Coordinates: 10.424717°N 61.417185°W
- Owner: Government of Trinidad and Tobago
- Operator: Ministry of Sports
- Capacity: 10,000
- Surface: Grass

Construction
- Opened: 2001
- Builder: Designworks Ltd.

Tenants
- Central F.C. Club Sando F.C. Trinidad and Tobago national football team

The Ato Boldon Stadium is an athletics and football stadium located in Balmain, Couva, Trinidad and Tobago. It is currently the home ground of Central and Club Sando.

== History ==
The stadium was constructed for the 2001 FIFA U-17 World Championship which was hosted by Trinidad and Tobago, and was named for eight-time Olympic and World Championship medal winner and 1997 200m World Champion, sprinter Ato Boldon. It hosted four of the six Group C matches.

It was also used for the 2010 FIFA U-17 Women's World Cup, in which it hosted one match from Group A, one from Group B, four of the Group C matches, one of the quarter-finals and both semi-finals.

The stadium played host to a World Cup qualifier on October 10, 2017, in which Trinidad and Tobago defeated the United States 2–1, which included an Omar Gonzalez own goal, which resulted in the United States failing to qualify for the 2018 FIFA World Cup, the first time the US didn't play in the final tournament since 1986, as Panama defeated Costa Rica 2–1, with Panama qualifying for their first ever World Cup, and also coupled with Honduras' win against Mexico 3–2, sending Honduras to the World Cup qualifying playoffs where they lost 3–1 against Australia.

Prior to the match, the United States complained of inadequate conditions after the track separating the pitch from the stands was flooded, forcing players to be carried across.
