= 2018 CONCACAF Women's Championship qualification =

The 2018 CONCACAF Women's Championship qualification is a women's football competition which decides the participating teams of the 2018 CONCACAF Women's Championship.

A total of eight teams played in the final tournament, which was held in the United States.

== Teams ==
A total of 30 (out of 41) CONCACAF member national teams entered, with three automatic qualifiers, and the remaining 27 teams entering regional qualification tournaments.

FIFA Women's World Rankings in March 2018 in parentheses (NR=Not ranked; N/A=Not applicable as they are not a FIFA member).

Zone	Berths	Automatic qualifiers	Teams entering qualification
North American Zone (NAFU)	3	**Canada** (4); **Mexico** (25); **United States** (1)	
Central American Zone (UNCAF)	2		**Costa Rica** (32); El Salvador (NR); Nicaragua (NR); **Panama** (NR)
Caribbean Zone (CFU)	3		Anguilla (NR); Antigua and Barbuda (NR); Aruba (NR); Barbados (NR); Bermuda (NR); **Cuba** (NR); Curaçao (NR); Dominica (NR); Dominican Republic (NR); Grenada (NR); Guadeloupe (N/A); Guyana (NR); Haiti (NR); **Jamaica** (NR); Martinique (N/A); Puerto Rico (NR); Saint Kitts and Nevis (NR); Saint Lucia (NR); Saint Vincent and the Grenadines (NR); Suriname (NR); **Trinidad and Tobago** (48); Turks and Caicos Islands (NR) (Note: Turks and Caicos Islands was initially the fifth team drawn into Group B in the first round of the Caribbean Zone, but shortly after was not included in the group.); U.S. Virgin Islands (NR)

Notes

- Teams in **bold** qualified for the final tournament.

Did not enter
North American Zone (NAFU)	None
Central American Zone (UNCAF)	Belize (NR); Guatemala (NR) (Note: Guatemala was suspended by FIFA in October 2016, and therefore was ineligible after missing the entry deadline of 30 March 2018.); Honduras (NR)
Caribbean Zone (CFU)	Bahamas (NR); Bonaire (N/A); British Virgin Islands (NR); Cayman Islands (NR); French Guiana (N/A); Montserrat (NR); Saint Martin (N/A); Sint Maarten (N/A)

== Format ==
In each group of all rounds, teams played each other once at a centralised venue.

- Central American Zone: The top two teams of the group qualify for the final tournament.
- Caribbean Zone: The winners of each first round group advance to the final round. The top three teams of the final round qualify for the final tournament.

=== Tiebreakers ===
Teams are ranked according to points (3 points for a win, 1 point for a draw, 0 points for a loss). The rankings of teams in each group are determined as follows (regulations Articles 12.4 and 12.7):

1. points obtained in all group matches;
2. goal difference in all group matches;
3. number of goals scored in all group matches;

If two or more teams are equal on the basis of the above three criteria, their rankings are determined as follows:

4. points obtained in the group matches between the teams concerned;
5. goal difference in the group matches between the teams concerned;
6. number of goals scored in the group matches between the teams concerned;
7. fair play points in all group matches:
  - first yellow card: minus 1 point;
  - indirect red card (second yellow card): minus 3 points;
  - direct red card: minus 4 points;
  - yellow card and direct red card: minus 5 points;
8. drawing of lots by CONCACAF.

== Schedule ==
The schedule of the qualifying rounds was as follows.

Zone	Round	Dates
Central American Zone	Group stage	27–31 August 2018
Caribbean Zone	First round	Group A: 5–13 May 2018; Group B: 9–13 May 2018; Group C: 19–27 May 2018; Group D: 23–27 May 2018; Group E: 23–27 May 2018
Caribbean Zone	Final round	25 August – 2 September 2018

== Central American Zone ==
2018 CONCACAF Women's Championship qualification (Central American Zone)
CONCACAF Clasificatoria Centroamericana Femenina 2018

Tournament details
- Host country: United States
- Cities: Bradenton, Florida
- Dates: 27–31 August
- Teams: 4 (from 1 confederation)
- Venues: 2 (in 1 host city)

Final positions
- Champions: Costa Rica
- Runners-up: Panama
- Third place: Nicaragua
- Fourth place: El Salvador

Tournament statistics
- Matches played: 6
- Goals scored: 36 (6 per match)
- Top scorer: (Costa Rica) Raquel Rodríguez (4 goals)

In the Central American Zone, four UNCAF member national teams entered the qualifying competition. The four teams were placed into one group, with the top two teams qualifying for the final tournament as the UNCAF representatives.

The qualifying competition was originally scheduled to take place in Nicaragua, but a new host was selected due to security concerns caused by civil unrest in Nicaragua. In July 2018, CONCACAF announced that all games would be played at the IMG Academy in Bradenton, Florida, United States.

All times local, UTC−4.

Pos	Team	Pld	W	D	L	GF	GA	GD	Pts	Qualification
1	Costa Rica	3	3	0	0	18	2	+16	9	2018 CONCACAF Women's Championship
2	Panama	3	2	0	1	11	5	+6	6	2018 CONCACAF Women's Championship
3	Nicaragua	3	0	1	2	3	10	−7	1	
4	El Salvador	3	0	1	2	4	19	−15	1	

Source: CONCACAF
Rules for classification: Tiebreakers
27 August 2018
10:00

Panama	4–0	Nicaragua
Riley 9', 68'; Pinzón 49'; Cedeño 90+4'	Report

IMG Academy Field 6, Bradenton
27 August 2018
10:00

Costa Rica	11–0	El Salvador
Herrera 5', 45+1', 55'; Alvarado 9'; Cruz 19', 21'; G. Villalobos 30'; Rodríguez 36'; Granados 64'; F. Villalobos 82'; Salas 84'	Report

IMG Academy Field 11, Bradenton

29 August 2018
10:00

Costa Rica	4–1	Nicaragua
Sánchez 3'; Rodríguez 61'; Barrantes 67'; Acosta 84'	Report	Aguilar 71'

IMG Academy Field 6, Bradenton
29 August 2018
10:00

El Salvador	2–6	Panama
Quélez 38'; Cerén 45+1' (pen.)	Report	Mills 41'; Riley 42'; Rangel 58', 69', 90+1'; Cedeño 80'

IMG Academy Field 11, Bradenton

31 August 2018
10:00

El Salvador	2–2	Nicaragua
J. Ramírez 18'; Tamacas 55'	Report	Silva 76', 79'

IMG Academy Field 6, Bradenton
31 August 2018
10:00

Costa Rica	3–1	Panama
Rodríguez 14', 25'; Granados 86'	Report	Hernández 74'

IMG Academy Field 11, Bradenton

== Caribbean Zone ==
2018 CONCACAF Women's Championship qualification (Caribbean Zone)
CONCACAF Caribbean Women's Qualifier 2018

Tournament details
- Host countries: Dominican Republic (Group A); Haiti (Group B); Trinidad and Tobago (Group C); Antigua and Barbuda (Group D); Guyana (Group E); Jamaica (Final round)
- Dates: First round: 5–27 May; Final round: 25 August – 2 September
- Teams: 23 (from 1 confederation)
- Venues: 6 (in 6 host cities)

Final positions
- Champions: Jamaica
- Runners-up: Trinidad and Tobago
- Third place: Cuba
- Fourth place: Bermuda

Tournament statistics
- Matches played: 48
- Goals scored: 225 (4.69 per match)
- Top scorer: (Jamaica) Khadija Shaw (16 goals)

In the Caribbean Zone, 23 CFU member national teams entered the qualifying competition, consisting of two stages. All teams entered the first round, and were drawn into three groups of five teams and two groups of four teams. The winners of each group advanced to the final round, where they were placed into one group, with the top three teams qualifying for the final tournament as the CFU representatives.

The draw of the qualifying competition was held on 27 March 2018, 12:00 UTC−4, at the CONCACAF headquarters in Miami Beach, Florida. Dominican Republic, Haiti, Trinidad and Tobago, Antigua and Barbuda, and Guyana were automatically seeded in Groups A–E respectively as hosts of each first round group, while the remaining 18 teams were seeded based on CONCACAF's own ranking.

Hosts	Dominican Republic (Position A1); Haiti (Position B1); Trinidad and Tobago (Position C1); Antigua and Barbuda (Position D1); Guyana (Position E1)
Pot 1	Jamaica; Puerto Rico; Saint Kitts and Nevis; Bermuda; Saint Lucia
Pot 2	Martinique; Suriname; Cuba; Saint Vincent and the Grenadines; U.S. Virgin Islands
Pot 3	Barbados; Turks and Caicos Islands; Aruba; Dominica; Curaçao
Pot 4	Grenada; Anguilla; Guadeloupe

=== First round ===
All times local, UTC−4.

==== Group A ====
Pos	Team	Pld	W	D	L	GF	GA	GD	Pts	Qualification
1	Cuba	4	3	1	0	22	3	+19	10	Final round
2	Puerto Rico	4	2	2	0	17	2	+15	8	
3	Dominican Republic (H)	4	2	1	1	7	5	+2	7	
4	Aruba	4	1	0	3	2	20	−18	3	
5	Anguilla	4	0	0	4	1	19	−18	0	

Source: CONCACAF
Rules for classification: Tiebreakers
(H) Hosts
5 May 2018
14:00

Puerto Rico	10–0	Anguilla
Socarrás 10'; Pagán 12', 38', 83'; Castain 20', 62', 65'; Suárez 23'; López 46'; Robinson 85'	Report (FDF)

Estadio Panamericano, San Cristóbal
5 May 2018
16:30

Dominican Republic	1–5	Cuba
Oviedo 15'	Report (FDF)	Peláez 10', 63'; L. Pérez 19'; M. Pérez 36'; Mengana 73'

Estadio Panamericano, San Cristóbal

7 May 2018
14:00

Cuba	11–0	Aruba
M. Pérez 4', 38', 58'; Sablón 20'; Mengana 29'; Carbonell 33', 88'; Maceo 61'; Arrebato 65'; Rodríguez 67'; Fuentes 90'	Report (FDF)

Estadio Panamericano, San Cristóbal
7 May 2018
16:30

Puerto Rico	0–0	Dominican Republic
	Report (FDF)

Estadio Panamericano, San Cristóbal

9 May 2018
14:00

Anguilla	1–2	Aruba
Johnson 71'	Report (FDF)	Saladin 44'; Florance 51'

Estadio Panamericano, San Cristóbal
9 May 2018
16:30

Cuba	2–2	Puerto Rico
Peláez 71'; L. Pérez 82'	Report (FDF)	Socarrás 15'; Blankenship 22'

Estadio Panamericano, San Cristóbal

11 May 2018
14:00

Aruba	0–5	Puerto Rico
	Report (FDF)	Castain 3', 90'; Tirado 25'; Maduro 38' (o.g.); Pagán 87'

Estadio Panamericano, San Cristóbal
11 May 2018
16:30

Dominican Republic	3–0	Anguilla
Oviedo 1', 60'; Romney 50' (o.g.)	Report (FDF)

Estadio Panamericano, San Cristóbal

13 May 2018
14:00

Anguilla	0–4	Cuba
	Report (FDF)	Peláez 18', 73'; M. Pérez 33'; Riquelme 54'

Estadio Panamericano, San Cristóbal
13 May 2018
16:30

Aruba	0–3	Dominican Republic
	Report (FDF)	Vargas 4' (pen.), 36' (pen.); Rivas 45'

Estadio Panamericano, San Cristóbal

==== Group B ====
Pos	Team	Pld	W	D	L	GF	GA	GD	Pts	Qualification
1	Jamaica	3	2	1	0	18	2	+16	7	Final round
2	Haiti (H)	3	2	1	0	15	2	+13	7	
3	Martinique	3	1	0	2	3	5	−2	3	
4	Guadeloupe	3	0	0	3	0	27	−27	0	
5	Turks and Caicos Islands	0	0	0	0	0	0	0	0	Withdrew

Source: CONCACAF
Rules for classification: Tiebreakers
(H) Hosts
9 May 2018
16:00

Jamaica	13–0	Guadeloupe
Shaw 4', 37', 42', 45', 62', 73'; Blackwood 23'; Plummer 32'; Bond-Flasza 43', 71'; Washington 61', 79'; Reid 83'	Report

Stade Sylvio Cator, Port-au-Prince
9 May 2018
18:30

Haiti	2–0	Martinique
Salomon-Ali 3'; Louis 15'	Report

Stade Sylvio Cator, Port-au-Prince

11 May 2018
16:00

Martinique	0–3	Jamaica
	Report	Asher 60'; Carter 70'; Shaw 75'

Stade Sylvio Cator, Port-au-Prince
11 May 2018
18:30

Guadeloupe	0–11	Haiti
	Report	Éloissaint 3', 12', 14'; Saint-Félix 31', 34', 45+2', 45+3', 51'; Louis 38'; Dacius 75'; Jeudy 90'

Stade Sylvio Cator, Port-au-Prince

13 May 2018
16:00

Guadeloupe	0–3	Martinique
	Report	Carin 5'; Guillou 53'; Paulin 58'

Stade Sylvio Cator, Port-au-Prince
13 May 2018
18:30

Jamaica	2–2	Haiti
Carter 44'; Shaw 66' (pen.)	Report	Dumonay 24'; Jeudy 43'

Stade Sylvio Cator, Port-au-Prince

==== Group C ====
Pos	Team	Pld	W	D	L	GF	GA	GD	Pts	Qualification
1	Trinidad and Tobago (H)	4	3	1	0	27	1	+26	10	Final round
2	Saint Kitts and Nevis	4	3	1	0	20	2	+18	10	
3	Dominica	4	1	1	2	5	6	−1	4	
4	U.S. Virgin Islands	4	1	0	3	3	20	−17	3	
5	Grenada	4	0	1	3	1	27	−26	1	

Source: CONCACAF
Rules for classification: Tiebreakers
(H) Hosts
19 May 2018
16:00

Dominica	1–2	Saint Kitts and Nevis
Phillip 10'	Report	Lawrence 8', 11'

Ato Boldon Stadium, Couva
19 May 2018
18:30

Trinidad and Tobago	10–0	U.S. Virgin Islands
Superville 15'; Shade 20', 40', 81', 90'; Forbes 37'; T. St. Louis 39'; Cunningham 45'; Johnson 60'; Wiater 73' (o.g.)	Report

Ato Boldon Stadium, Couva

21 May 2018
16:00

U.S. Virgin Islands	3–0	Grenada
Wright 74'; Canizio 89'; Aguilar 90+2'	Report

Ato Boldon Stadium, Couva
21 May 2018
18:30

Dominica	0–3	Trinidad and Tobago
	Report	Cunningham 5'; Belgrave 37'; Forbes 54'

Ato Boldon Stadium, Couva

23 May 2018
16:00

Saint Kitts and Nevis	10–0	Grenada
Uddenberg 6', 19', 71'; Browne 9', 52'; Lawrence 40', 73', 85'; Bailey-Williams 86'; L. Wilkinson 89'

Ato Boldon Stadium, Couva
23 May 2018
18:30

U.S. Virgin Islands	0–3	Dominica
		Francis 23'; Phillip 49', 88'

Ato Boldon Stadium, Couva

25 May 2018
16:00

Grenada	1–1	Dominica
George 64'	Report	Phillip 29'

Ato Boldon Stadium, Couva
25 May 2018
18:30

Trinidad and Tobago	1–1	Saint Kitts and Nevis
T. St. Louis 79'	Report	Browne 3' (pen.)

Ato Boldon Stadium, Couva

27 May 2018
16:00

Saint Kitts and Nevis	7–0	U.S. Virgin Islands
Browne 27', 38', 52'; Fernandez 46'; Francis 57'; Springer 70'; Uddenberg 83'	Report

Ato Boldon Stadium, Couva
27 May 2018
18:30

Grenada	0–13	Trinidad and Tobago
	Report	Johnson 10'; Cunningham 13'; Shade 33', 82'; T. St. Louis 42', 90+2'; Prince 43', 88', 90'; Cato 45', 54'; François 51', 80'

Ato Boldon Stadium, Couva

==== Group D ====
Pos	Team	Pld	W	D	L	GF	GA	GD	Pts	Qualification
1	Antigua and Barbuda (H)	3	3	0	0	5	0	+5	9	Final round
2	Saint Lucia	3	2	0	1	4	3	+1	6	
3	Curaçao	3	1	0	2	2	5	−3	3	
4	Saint Vincent and the Grenadines	3	0	0	3	1	4	−3	0	

Source: CONCACAF
Rules for classification: Tiebreakers
(H) Hosts
23 May 2018
16:00

Saint Lucia	2–1	Curaçao
Marquis 30'; Lionel 58'		Statia 55'

Antigua Recreation Ground, St. John's
23 May 2018
18:30

Antigua and Barbuda	1–0	Saint Vincent and the Grenadines
James 69'

Antigua Recreation Ground, St. John's

25 May 2018
16:00

Saint Vincent and the Grenadines	1–2	Saint Lucia
Duncan 74'	Report	Willie 5'; Cox 88'

Antigua Recreation Ground, St. John's
25 May 2018
18:30

Curaçao	0–3	Antigua and Barbuda
	Report	Jarvis 49'; Simon-Ponte 60'; Humphreys 79'

Antigua Recreation Ground, St. John's

27 May 2018
16:00

Curaçao	1–0	Saint Vincent and the Grenadines
Tokaay 52'	Report

Antigua Recreation Ground, St. John's
27 May 2018
18:30

Saint Lucia	0–1	Antigua and Barbuda
	Report	Edwards 2'

Antigua Recreation Ground, St. John's

==== Group E ====
Pos	Team	Pld	W	D	L	GF	GA	GD	Pts	Qualification
1	Bermuda	3	2	1	0	6	4	+2	7	Final round
2	Guyana (H)	3	1	2	0	8	3	+5	5	
3	Barbados	3	1	1	1	4	4	0	4	
4	Suriname	3	0	0	3	2	9	−7	0	

Source: CONCACAF
Rules for classification: Tiebreakers
(H) Hosts
23 May 2018
17:00

Barbados	2–1	Suriname
Padmore 2'; Jarvis 40'		Hoogdorp 20'

Synthetic Track and Field Facility, Leonora
23 May 2018
19:30

Guyana	2–2	Bermuda
Desa 7'; Hazlewood 58'		Lindo 5', 16'

Synthetic Track and Field Facility, Leonora

25 May 2018
17:00

Bermuda	3–2	Barbados
Furbert 17'; Lindo 68'; Darrell 74'	Report	Jarvis 32'; Padmore 89'

Synthetic Track and Field Facility, Leonora
25 May 2018
19:30

Suriname	1–6	Guyana
Rigters 38'	Report	Persaud 40', 67'; Desa 45'; Copland 58'; Cummings 65'; Smith 88'

Synthetic Track and Field Facility, Leonora

27 May 2018
17:00

Suriname	0–1	Bermuda
	Report	Furbert 41'

Synthetic Track and Field Facility, Leonora
27 May 2018
20:20 (Note: Match originally scheduled to commence at 19:30 but was delayed due to a power outage.)

Barbados	0–0	Guyana
	Report

Synthetic Track and Field Facility, Leonora

=== Final round ===
CONCACAF announced on 7 June 2018 that Jamaica would host the final round.

All times local, UTC−5.

Pos	Team	Pld	W	D	L	GF	GA	GD	Pts	Qualification
1	Jamaica (H)	4	4	0	0	23	2	+21	12	2018 CONCACAF Women's Championship
2	Trinidad and Tobago	4	3	0	1	12	6	+6	9	2018 CONCACAF Women's Championship
3	Cuba	4	2	0	2	12	9	+3	6	2018 CONCACAF Women's Championship
4	Bermuda	4	1	0	3	5	9	−4	3	
5	Antigua and Barbuda	4	0	0	4	0	26	−26	0	

Source: CONCACAF
Rules for classification: Tiebreakers
(H) Hosts
25 August 2018
15:00

Cuba	2–3	Trinidad and Tobago
Ramos 23'; Mengana 83'	Report	Taylor 20', 51', 55'

National Stadium, Kingston
25 August 2018
18:00

Jamaica	9–0	Antigua and Barbuda
Chang 2' (pen.); Carter 6'; Shaw 9', 48', 53'; Blackwood 27'; Shim 65'; Sweatman 68', 73'	Report

National Stadium, Kingston

27 August 2018
16:00

Antigua and Barbuda	0–7	Cuba
	Report	M. Pérez 8', 56'; L. Pérez 25', 64'; Peláez 67', 78'; Carbonell 90+1'

National Stadium, Kingston
27 August 2018
19:00

Bermuda	0–4	Jamaica
	Report	Carter 17'; Plummer 32'; Shaw 61'; Washington 90+1'

National Stadium, Kingston

29 August 2018
16:00

Trinidad and Tobago	5–0	Antigua and Barbuda
François 4'; Taylor 16', 39'; T. St. Louis 30' (pen.); Cordner 65'	Report

National Stadium, Kingston
29 August 2018
19:00

Cuba	2–0	Bermuda
L. Pérez 31'; M. Pérez 52'	Report

National Stadium, Kingston

31 August 2018
16:00

Antigua and Barbuda	0–5	Bermuda
	Report	Furbert 14'; Christopher 44'; Darrell 76', 81' (pen.); Lindo 87'

National Stadium, Kingston
31 August 2018
19:00

Trinidad and Tobago	1–4	Jamaica
Taylor 10'	Report	Washington 70'; Shaw 79', 89'; Brown 90+2'

National Stadium, Kingston

2 September 2018
15:00

Bermuda	0–3	Trinidad and Tobago
	Report	Taylor 12'; Cordner 57', 87'

National Stadium, Kingston
2 September 2018
18:00

Jamaica	6–1	Cuba
Asher 19', 70'; Shaw 20', 38'; Silver 32'; Brown 34' (pen.)	Report	M. Pérez 90+3'

National Stadium, Kingston

== Qualified teams ==
The following eight teams qualified for the final tournament.

Team	Qualified as	Qualified on	Previous appearances in CONCACAF Women's Championship^{1}
Canada	Automatic qualifiers	N/A	8 (1991, 1993, 1994, **1998**, 2000, 2002, 2006, **2010**)
Mexico	Automatic qualifiers	N/A	8 (1991, 1994, 1998, 2000, 2002, 2006, 2010, 2014)
United States	Automatic qualifiers & Hosts	N/A	8 (**1991**, **1993**, **1994**, **2000**, **2002**, **2006**, 2010, **2014**)
Costa Rica	Central American Zone top two	29 August 2018	6 (1991, 1998, 2000, 2002, 2010, 2014)
Panama	Central American Zone top two	29 August 2018	2 (2002, 2006)
Jamaica	Caribbean Zone top three	31 August 2018	5 (1991, 1994, 2002, 2006, 2014)
Trinidad and Tobago	Caribbean Zone top three	31 August 2018	9 (1991, 1993, 1994, 1998, 2000, 2002, 2006, 2010, 2014)
Cuba	Caribbean Zone top three	2 September 2018	0 (debut)

^{1} Bold indicates champions for that year. Italic indicates hosts for that year.

== Goalscorers ==
There were 261 goals scored in 54 matches, for an average of 4.83 goals per match.

16 goals

- (Jamaica) Khadija Shaw

9 goals

- (Cuba) María Pérez

7 goals

- (Cuba) Rachel Peláez
- (Trinidad and Tobago) Kayla Taylor

6 goals

- (Saint Kitts and Nevis) Phoenetia Browne
- (Trinidad and Tobago) Mariah Shade

5 goals

- (Cuba) Lilian Pérez
- (Haiti) Mikerline Saint-Félix
- (Puerto Rico) Micaela Castain
- (Saint Kitts and Nevis) Brittney Lawrence
- (Trinidad and Tobago) Tasha St. Louis

4 goals

- (Bermuda) Teyah Lindo
- (Costa Rica) Raquel Rodríguez
- (Dominica) Romelcia Phillip
- (Jamaica) Trudi Carter
- (Jamaica) Giselle Washington
- (Puerto Rico) Selimar Pagán
- (Saint Kitts and Nevis) Cloey Uddenberg

3 goals

- (Bermuda) Deshae Darrell
- (Bermuda) Akeyla Furbert
- (Costa Rica) Melissa Herrera
- (Cuba) Dianelis Carbonell
- (Cuba) Maristania Mengana
- (Dominican Republic) Alyssa Oviedo
- (Haiti) Roseline Éloissaint
- (Jamaica) Chinyelu Asher
- (Panama) Kenia Rangel
- (Panama) Karla Riley
- (Trinidad and Tobago) Kennya Cordner
- (Trinidad and Tobago) Jenelle Cunningham
- (Trinidad and Tobago) Janine François
- (Trinidad and Tobago) Aaliyah Prince

2 goals

- (Barbados) Felicia Jarvis
- (Barbados) Caitlin Padmore
- (Costa Rica) Shirley Cruz
- (Costa Rica) Cristín Granados
- (Dominican Republic) Denny Vargas
- (Guyana) Brianne Desa
- (Guyana) Brittany Persaud
- (Haiti) Sherly Jeudy
- (Haiti) Batcheba Louis
- (Jamaica) Deneisha Blackwood
- (Jamaica) Dominique Bond-Flasza
- (Jamaica) Jody Brown
- (Jamaica) Konya Plummer
- (Jamaica) Marlo Sweatman
- (Nicaragua) Martha Silva
- (Panama) Lineth Cedeño
- (Puerto Rico) Karina Socarrás
- (Trinidad and Tobago) Jonelle Cato
- (Trinidad and Tobago) Karyn Forbes
- (Trinidad and Tobago) Kédie Johnson

1 goal

- (Anguilla) Coleen Johnson
- (Antigua and Barbuda) Britney Edwards
- (Antigua and Barbuda) Breanna Humphreys
- (Antigua and Barbuda) Jahira James
- (Antigua and Barbuda) Marley Jarvis
- (Antigua and Barbuda) Damali Simon-Ponte
- (Aruba) Donnevier Florance
- (Aruba) Nicole Saladin
- (Bermuda) Nia Christopher
- (Costa Rica) Wendy Acosta
- (Costa Rica) Katherine Alvarado
- (Costa Rica) María Barrantes
- (Costa Rica) María Paula Salas
- (Costa Rica) Fabiola Sánchez
- (Costa Rica) Fabiola Villalobos
- (Costa Rica) Gloriana Villalobos
- (Cuba) Ollancy Arrebato
- (Cuba) Yaremis Fuentes
- (Cuba) Sucel Maceo
- (Cuba) Yenifer Ramos
- (Cuba) Francis Riquelme
- (Cuba) Zailín Rodríguez
- (Cuba) Yilianny Sablón
- (Curaçao) Samantha Statia
- (Curaçao) Riesmarly Tokaay
- (Dominica) Keanna Francis
- (Dominican Republic) Andrea Rivas
- (El Salvador) Brenda Cerén
- (El Salvador) Damaris Quelez
- (El Salvador) Jency Ramírez
- (El Salvador) Sandra Tamacas
- (Grenada) Monique George
- (Guyana) Calaigh Copland
- (Guyana) Sydney Cummings
- (Guyana) Cameo Hazlewood
- (Guyana) Tiandi Smith
- (Haiti) Melissa Dacius
- (Haiti) Melchie Dumonay
- (Haiti) Donya Salomon-Ali
- (Jamaica) Christina Chang
- (Jamaica) Kevena Reid
- (Jamaica) Ashleigh Shim
- (Jamaica) Lauren Silver
- (Martinique) Prisca Carin
- (Martinique) Johanne Guillou
- (Martinique) Nathaela Paulin
- (Nicaragua) Doriana Aguilar
- (Panama) Erika Hernández
- (Panama) Natalia Mills
- (Panama) Yomira Pinzón
- (Puerto Rico) Rachel Blankenship
- (Puerto Rico) Mariana López
- (Puerto Rico) Marcela Robinson
- (Puerto Rico) Laura Suárez
- (Puerto Rico) Adriana Tirado
- (Saint Kitts and Nevis) Iyanla Bailey-Williams
- (Saint Kitts and Nevis) Arielle Fernandez
- (Saint Kitts and Nevis) Lavern Francis
- (Saint Kitts and Nevis) Caroline Springer
- (Saint Kitts and Nevis) Leranja Wilkinson
- (Saint Lucia) Chresilda Cox
- (Saint Lucia) Lyla Lionel
- (Saint Lucia) Ellaisa Marquis
- (Saint Lucia) Sylvie Willie
- (Saint Vincent and the Grenadines) Darie-Ann Duncan
- (Suriname) Saffira Hoogdorp
- (Suriname) Sabrina Rigters
- (Trinidad and Tobago) Rhea Belgrave
- (Trinidad and Tobago) Patrice Superville
- (United States Virgin Islands) Tamika Aguilar
- (United States Virgin Islands) Bianca Canizio
- (United States Virgin Islands) Maya Wright

1 own goal

- (Anguilla) Shakeela Romney (against Dominican Republic)
- (Aruba) Joraine Maduro (against Puerto Rico)
- (United States Virgin Islands) Katelyn Wiater (against Trinidad and Tobago)
