= 2020 CONCACAF Women's Olympic Qualifying Championship qualification =

Tournament details
- Host countries: Costa Rica (Central America Group A); Panama (Central America Group B); Trinidad and Tobago (Caribbean Group A); Jamaica (Caribbean Group B); Puerto Rico (Caribbean Group C)
- Dates: Central America: 4–8 October 2019; Caribbean: 30 September – 8 October 2019
- Teams: 22 (from 1 confederation)

The qualifying competition for the 2020 CONCACAF Women's Olympic Qualifying Championship determined five of the eight teams of 2020 CONCACAF Women's Olympic Qualifying Championship final tournament.

== Teams ==
A total of 25 CONCACAF teams (out of 41) entered Olympic qualifying, with 22 involved in regional qualifiers for the final tournament. The entrants are divided into three zones:

- North American Zone (NAFU): All 3 teams, Canada, Mexico, and United States, qualified automatically for the final tournament.
- Central American Zone (UNCAF): 6 out of 7 teams entered, with two teams qualifying for the final tournament.
- Caribbean Zone (CFU): 16 out of 31 teams entered, with three teams qualifying for the final tournament.

Zone	Teams entering Olympic qualifying	Did not enter
North American Zone (NAFU)	**Canada** **(Q)**; **Mexico** **(Q)**; **United States** **(Q)**	
Central American Zone (UNCAF)	Costa Rica; El Salvador; Guatemala; Honduras; Nicaragua; Panama	Belize
Caribbean Zone (CFU)	Antigua and Barbuda; Aruba; Barbados; Cuba; Dominica **(W)**; Dominican Republic; Grenada **(W)**; Guyana **(W)**; Haiti; Jamaica; Puerto Rico; Saint Kitts and Nevis; Saint Lucia; Suriname; Trinidad and Tobago; U.S. Virgin Islands	Anguilla **(N)**; Bahamas; Bermuda; Bonaire **(N)**; British Virgin Islands; Cayman Islands; Curaçao **(N)**; French Guiana **(N)**; Guadeloupe **(N)**; Martinique **(N)**; Montserrat **(N)**; Saint Martin **(N)**; Sint Maarten **(N)**; Saint Vincent and the Grenadines; Turks and Caicos Islands **(N)**

Notes

- Teams in **bold** qualified for the final tournament.
- (N): Not a member of the International Olympic Committee, ineligible for Olympics
- (Q): Qualified automatically for final tournament
- (W): Withdrew after draw

== Draw ==
The draw for the Caribbean qualifying round took place on 29 July 2019, 11:00 EDT (UTC−4), at the CONCACAF Headquarters in Miami. The 16 teams which entered the Caribbean qualifying round were drawn into three groups, one of six teams and two of five teams. Based on the FIFA World Ranking (as of 29 March 2019), the 16 teams were distributed into five pots, as follows:

Pot 1	Pot 2	Pot 3	Pot 4	Pot 5
Jamaica (53); Trinidad and Tobago (60); Haiti (72)	Guyana (89); Cuba (93); Puerto Rico (105)	Dominican Republic (106); Suriname (119); Saint Lucia (129)	Saint Kitts and Nevis (130); Barbados (132); Dominica (139)	Grenada (141); U.S. Virgin Islands (143); Antigua and Barbuda (149); Aruba (154)

The draw for the Central American qualifying round took place on 30 July 2019, 11:00 EDT (UTC−4), at the CONCACAF Headquarters in Miami. The six teams which entered the Central American qualifying round were drawn into two groups of three teams. Based on the FIFA World Ranking (as of 29 March 2019), the six teams were distributed into three pots, with top seeds assigned to each group prior to the draw, as follows:

Top seeds	Pot 1	Pot 2
Costa Rica (36) (A1); Panama (56) (B1)	Guatemala (80); El Salvador (104)	Nicaragua (121); Honduras (no rank)

== Central America ==
Matches were played between 4–8 October 2019. Group winners qualified for 2020 CONCACAF Women's Olympic Qualifying Championship.

=== Group A ===
All matches will be held in Costa Rica. Times are local, UTC–6.

Pos	Team	Pld	W	D	L	GF	GA	GD	Pts	Qualification
1	Costa Rica (H)	2	2	0	0	7	0	+7	6	2020 CONCACAF Women's Olympic Qualifying Championship
2	Nicaragua	2	1	0	1	2	3	−1	3	
3	El Salvador	2	0	0	2	1	7	−6	0	

Source: CONCACAF
Rules for classification: Qualifying stage tiebreakers
(H) Hosts
4 October 2019
20:00

Costa Rica	2–0	Nicaragua
Chinchilla 61'; Salas 90+1'	Report

Estadio Alejandro Morera Soto, Alajuela

6 October 2019
16:00

El Salvador	1–2	Nicaragua
Cerén 13'	Report	Silva 45+2'; Flores 85'

Estadio Alejandro Morera Soto, Alajuela

8 October 2019
19:00

El Salvador	0–5	Costa Rica
	Report	Rodríguez 5', 18'; Salas 39'; Chinchilla 56'; Varela 85'

Estadio Alejandro Morera Soto, Alajuela

=== Group B ===
All matches were held in Panama. Times are local, UTC–5.

Pos	Team	Pld	W	D	L	GF	GA	GD	Pts	Qualification
1	Panama (H)	2	2	0	0	6	1	+5	6	2020 CONCACAF Women's Olympic Qualifying Championship
2	Guatemala	2	1	0	1	5	3	+2	3	
3	Honduras	2	0	0	2	0	7	−7	0	

Source: CONCACAF
Rules for classification: Qualifying stage tiebreakers
(H) Hosts
4 October 2019
20:00 UTC−5

Panama	3–0	Honduras
Pinzón 2'; Cox 14'; Riley 36'	Report

Estadio Rommel Fernández, Panama City

6 October 2019
18:00

Guatemala	4–0	Honduras
Aguilar 67'; Rivera 74'; Mayén 90'; Albeño 90+5'	Report

Estadio Rommel Fernández, Panama City

8 October 2019
20:00

Guatemala	1–3	Panama
Martínez 34' (pen.)	Report	Riley 9'; Cox 26' (pen.); Mills 55'

Estadio Rommel Fernández, Panama City

== Caribbean ==
The Group A and B matches were played between 30 September – 8 October, and the Group C matches were played between 3–7 October 2019. Group winners qualified for 2020 CONCACAF Women's Olympic Qualifying Championship.

=== Group A ===
All matches were held in Trinidad and Tobago. Times are local, UTC−4.

Pos	Team	Pld	W	D	L	GF	GA	GD	Pts	Qualification
1	Saint Kitts and Nevis	4	3	1	0	20	2	+18	10	2020 CONCACAF Women's Olympic Qualifying Championship
2	Dominican Republic	4	2	2	0	4	0	+4	8	
3	Trinidad and Tobago (H)	4	2	1	1	9	4	+5	7	
4	Antigua and Barbuda	4	1	0	3	2	18	−16	3	
5	Aruba	4	0	0	4	2	13	−11	0	
6	Guyana	0	0	0	0	0	0	0	0	Withdrew

Source: CONCACAF
Rules for classification: Qualifying stage tiebreakers
(H) Hosts
30 September 2019
14:30

Saint Kitts and Nevis	0–0	Dominican Republic
	Report

Ato Boldon Stadium, Couva
30 September 2019
17:00

Aruba	0–3	Trinidad and Tobago
	Report	Walcott 3'; Cornwall 74'; François 90+3'

Ato Boldon Stadium, Couva

2 October 2019
14:30

Dominican Republic	2–0	Aruba
Balbuena 8', 69'	Report

Ato Boldon Stadium, Couva
2 October 2019
17:00

Trinidad and Tobago	5–0	Antigua and Barbuda
Walcott 13', 89'; Forbes 45+4' (pen.), 70'; A. Prince 83'	Report

Ato Boldon Stadium, Couva

4 October 2019
14:30

Antigua and Barbuda	0–2	Dominican Republic
	Report	Balbuena 68' (pen.); J. Oviedo 74'

Ato Boldon Stadium, Couva
4 October 2019
17:00

Aruba	1–6	Saint Kitts and Nevis
Werleman 73'	Report	Lawrence 10', 17'; Bailey-Williams 26'; C. Uddenberg 30', 44'; Browne 56'

Ato Boldon Stadium, Couva

6 October 2019
14:30

Antigua and Barbuda	2–1	Aruba
Stewart 55'; Jacobs 57'	Report	Wester-Maduro 21'

Ato Boldon Stadium, Couva
6 October 2019
17:00

Trinidad and Tobago	1–4	Saint Kitts and Nevis
D. Prince 60'	Report	Stokes 7'; Browne 15' (pen.), 24', 84'

Ato Boldon Stadium, Couva

8 October 2019
14:30

Saint Kitts and Nevis	10–0	Antigua and Barbuda
J. Williams 5', 86'; C. Uddenberg 9', 22', 37'; Browne 39', 49'; Springer 59'; Lawrence 64', 72'	Report

Ato Boldon Stadium, Couva
8 October 2019
17:00

Trinidad and Tobago	0–0	Dominican Republic
	Report

Ato Boldon Stadium, Couva

=== Group B ===
All matches were held in Jamaica. Times are local, UTC−5.

Pos	Team	Pld	W	D	L	GF	GA	GD	Pts	Qualification
1	Jamaica (H)	4	4	0	0	37	1	+36	12	2020 CONCACAF Women's Olympic Qualifying Championship
2	Cuba	4	3	0	1	19	14	+5	9	
3	Barbados	4	2	0	2	8	15	−7	6	
4	Saint Lucia	4	1	0	3	7	21	−14	3	
5	U.S. Virgin Islands	4	0	0	4	1	21	−20	0	

Source: CONCACAF
Rules for classification: Qualifying stage tiebreakers
(H) Hosts
30 September 2019
16:00

Barbados	3–2	Saint Lucia
Briggs-Thompson 16'; Stevenson 17', 20'	Report	St. Louis 37'; Shepherd 70'

National Stadium, Kingston
30 September 2019
18:30

Jamaica	12–1	Cuba
Blackwood 6' (pen.); Carter 15'; Matthews 21', 32', 63', 70'; Cameron 39', 54'; Paterson 73'; Clarke 79'; Mena 81' (o.g.); Bond-Flasza 89'	Report	Calderón 56'

National Stadium, Kingston
Referee: Melissa Borjas (Honduras)

2 October 2019
16:00

Saint Lucia	4–1	U.S. Virgin Islands
Shepherd 13', 18'; St. Louis 40'; Lashley 66'	Report	Montano 35'

National Stadium, Kingston
2 October 2019
18:30

Cuba	6–1	Barbados
Briggs-Thompson 13' (o.g.); Calderón 18', 48', 69'; Mengana 19'; M. Pérez 74'	Report	Stevenson 71' (pen.)

National Stadium, Kingston

4 October 2019
16:00

U.S. Virgin Islands	0–6	Cuba
	Report	Calderón 8', 34'; L. Pérez 38', 51'; Rodríguez 45', 50'

National Stadium, Kingston
4 October 2019
18:30

Barbados	0–7	Jamaica
	Report	Matthews 1', 23'; Briggs-Thompson 6' (o.g.); Carter 32', 36'; Asher 70'; Shaw 90+1' (pen.)

National Stadium, Kingston
Referee: Cibeles Miranda (El Salvador)

6 October 2019
16:00

U.S. Virgin Islands	0–4	Barbados
	Report	Thompson 3'; Johnson 33', 73'; Als 41'

National Stadium, Kingston
6 October 2019
18:30

Saint Lucia	0–11	Jamaica
	Report	Shaw 4', 17', 35'; Matthews 6'; Blackwood 25', 69', 79'; Bond-Flasza 32'; Cameron 38'; Carter 56'; Clarke 90'

National Stadium, Kingston
Referee: Quetzalli Alvarado (Mexico)

8 October 2019
16:00

Cuba	6–1	Saint Lucia
Chirino 13'; M. Pérez 42' (pen.), 48' (pen.); Calderón 50'; Rodríguez 69' (pen.), 73'	Report	St. Louis 61'

National Stadium, Kingston
8 October 2019
18:30

Jamaica	7–0	U.S. Virgin Islands
Shaw 7', 15', 21', 29', 75'; Matthews 9'; Carter 32'	Report

National Stadium, Kingston

=== Group C ===
All matches were held in Puerto Rico. Times are local, UTC−4.

Pos	Team	Pld	W	D	L	GF	GA	GD	Pts	Qualification
1	Haiti	2	2	0	0	12	1	+11	6	2020 CONCACAF Women's Olympic Qualifying Championship
2	Puerto Rico (H)	2	1	0	1	7	3	+4	3	
3	Suriname	2	0	0	2	1	16	−15	0	
4	Dominica	0	0	0	0	0	0	0	0	Withdrew
5	Grenada	0	0	0	0	0	0	0	0	Withdrew

Source: CONCACAF
Rules for classification: Qualifying stage tiebreakers
(H) Hosts
3 October 2019
19:00

Haiti	10–0	Suriname
Mondésir 9', 30', 52', 65'; Louis 16', 26', 43'; Saint-Félix 70' (pen.), 72'; Lebrun 87'	Report

Juan Ramón Loubriel Stadium, Bayamón, Puerto Rico

5 October 2019
19:00

Suriname	1–6	Puerto Rico
Stekkinger 64'	Report	Díaz 15', 20', 86'; Socarrás 45', 73'; Suárez 62'

Juan Ramón Loubriel Stadium, Bayamón, Puerto Rico

7 October 2019
19:00

Puerto Rico	1–2	Haiti
Díaz 24'	Report	Saint-Félix 13'; Dumornay 84'

Juan Ramón Loubriel Stadium, Bayamón, Puerto Rico

== Qualified teams ==
The following eight teams qualified for the final tournament.

Team	Zone	Qualified on	Previous appearances in CONCACAF Women's Olympic Qualifying Tournament^{1}
Canada	North America	Automatic	4 (2004, 2008, 2012, 2016)
Mexico	North America	Automatic	4 (2004, 2008, 2012, 2016)
United States	North America	Automatic	4 (**2004**, **2008**, **2012**, **2016**)
Costa Rica	Central America (Group A)	8 October 2019	4 (2004, 2008, 2012, 2016)
Panama	Central America (Group B)	8 October 2019	1 (2004)
Saint Kitts and Nevis	Caribbean (Group A)	8 October 2019	0 (debut)
Jamaica	Caribbean (Group B)	8 October 2019	1 (2008)
Haiti	Caribbean (Group C)	7 October 2019	1 (2012)

^{1} Bold indicates champions for that year. Italic indicates hosts for that year.
