= Caroline Springer =

Saint Kitts and Nevis footballer (born 1990)

Personal information
- Full name: Caroline Tracy Springer
- Date of birth: March 22, 1990 (age 36)
- Place of birth: Saint Kitts and Nevis
- Position: Forward

Team information
- Current team: Village Superstars FC
- Number: 7

Senior career*
Years	Team	Apps	(Gls)
2017	Treasure Coast Dynamites		
2018–2019	Newtown United FC		
2019–	Village Superstars FC		

International career^{‡}
2008–2010	Saint Kitts and Nevis U20		
2014–	Saint Kitts and Nevis		(6)
- * Club domestic league appearances and goals as of 5 June 2023 ‡ National team caps and goals as of 5 June 2023

Caroline Tracy Springer (born 22 March 1990) is a Kittitian professional women's footballer who plays as a forward for the Saint Kitts and Nevis national team and the Village Superstars FC.

== Club career ==
In 2017, Springer played for the Miami-based Treasure Coast Dynamites of the American Women's Premier Soccer League.

Springer won the 2018–19 Elvis Star Browne Women's League with S-Krave Newtown United Women and won the league's golden boot.

On 17 December 2020, Springer, playing for Village Superstars FC, scored an equalizing brace against Cayon Rockets in the Elvis Star Browne Women's League semi-finals to complete a comeback draw, in which Village advanced on penalties.

== International career ==
As a youth international, Springer participated in qualifiers for the 2008 and 2010 CONCACAF Women's U-20 Championship tournaments, scoring a goal in each.

In 2019, Springer was called up to the Saint Kitts and Nevis national team roster for the 2020 CONCACAF Women's Olympic Qualifying Championship qualification tournament, where the team competed in Caribbean Union Group A. Springer scored a goal during the Sugar Girlz' 10–0 win over Barbuda, a match that secured the top position in the group and advancement to the tournament finals.

In 2022, Springer scored for Saint Kitts and Nevis during the 2022 CONCACAF W Championship qualification group stage match against the U.S. Virgin Islands.

== Career statistics ==
As of 5 June 2023

Date	Location	Opponent	Score	Result	Competition	Ref.
25 May 2014	Providenciales, Turks and Caicos Islands	Cayman Islands	3–0	4–0	2014 CFU Women's Caribbean Cup	
20 April 2018	Basseterre, Saint Kitts	Saint Vincent and the Grenadines	1–0	2–0	2018 CFU Women's Challenge Series	
27 May 2018	Couva, Trinidad and Tobago	U.S. Virgin Islands	6–0	7–0	2018 CONCACAF Women's Championship qualification	
8 October 2019	Couva, Trinidad and Tobago	Antigua and Barbuda	7–0	10–0	2020 CONCACAF Women's Olympic Qualifying Championship qualification	
3 February 2022	The Valley, Anguilla	Anguilla	2–0	3–0	International friendly	
13 April 2022	Basseterre, Saint Kitts	U.S. Virgin Islands	3–0	6–0	2022 CONCACAF W Championship qualification	

== Honors ==
S-Krave Newtown United

- Elvis Star Browne Women's League: 2018–19
- Elvis Star Browne Women's League Golden Boot: 2018–19
