= Brittney Lawrence =

St. Kitts and Nevis footballer (b. 1995)

Personal information
- Date of birth: 18 August 1995 (age 31)
- Place of birth: Scarborough, Ontario, Canada
- Height: 1.65 m (5 ft 5 in)
- Position: Forward

Youth career
- Markham Lightning

College career
Years	Team	Apps	(Gls)
2013–2014	Butler Grizzlies	23+	(28+)
2015–2016	Oral Roberts Golden Eagles	42	(13)

Senior career*
Years	Team	Apps	(Gls)
2018	Durham United FA	6	(0)
2019–?	Skoftebyns IF		
2021	FH	17	(4)
2022	Pickering FC	10	(2)

International career^{‡}
2013	Saint Kitts and Nevis U20		(5)
2018–	Saint Kitts and Nevis	12+	(10+)
- * Club domestic league appearances and goals as of 24 July 2022 ‡ National team caps and goals as of 29 January 2010

Brittney Lawrence (born 18 August 1995) is a footballer who plays as a forward. Born in Canada, she represents Saint Kitts and Nevis at international level.

== College career ==
Lawrence attended the Butler Community College and the Oral Roberts University, both in the United States.

== Club career ==
Lawrence played for League1 Ontario side Durham United FA in 2018. One year later, she joined Skoftebyns IF in the Swedish Division 1.

In April 2021, Lawrence signed with FH of the Icelandic 1 . deild kvenna. FOr the season she netted 4 goals in 17 league matches and one goal in 4 matches in the Icelandic Cup.

In 2022, she played with Pickering FC (who she previously played with when they were known as Durham United) in League1 Ontario.

== International career ==
Lawrence represented Saint Kitts and Nevis at the 2014 CONCACAF Women's U-20 Championship qualification. At senior level, she played the 2018 CONCACAF Women's Championship qualification.

=== International goals ===
Scores and results list Saint Kitts and Nevis's goal tally first

No.	Date	Venue	Opponent	Score	Result	Competition
1	18 April 2018	Warner Park Sporting Complex, Basseterre, Saint Kitts and Nevis	Dominica	1–0	1–0	2018 CFU Women's Challenge Series
2	19 May 2018	Ato Boldon Stadium, Couva, Trinidad and Tobago	Dominica	1–0	2–1	2018 CONCACAF Women's Championship qualification
3	19 May 2018	Ato Boldon Stadium, Couva, Trinidad and Tobago	Dominica	2–1	2–1	2018 CONCACAF Women's Championship qualification
4	23 May 2018	Ato Boldon Stadium, Couva, Trinidad and Tobago	Grenada	4–0	10–0	2018 CONCACAF Women's Championship qualification
5	23 May 2018	Ato Boldon Stadium, Couva, Trinidad and Tobago	Grenada	7–0	10–0	2018 CONCACAF Women's Championship qualification
6	23 May 2018	Ato Boldon Stadium, Couva, Trinidad and Tobago	Grenada	8–0	10–0	2018 CONCACAF Women's Championship qualification
7	4 October 2019	Ato Boldon Stadium, Couva, Trinidad and Tobago	Aruba	1–0	6–1	2020 CONCACAF Women's Olympic Qualifying Championship qualification
8	4 October 2019	Ato Boldon Stadium, Couva, Trinidad and Tobago	Aruba	2–0	6–1	2020 CONCACAF Women's Olympic Qualifying Championship qualification
9	8 October 2019	Ato Boldon Stadium, Couva, Trinidad and Tobago	Antigua and Barbuda	8–0	10–0	2020 CONCACAF Women's Olympic Qualifying Championship qualification
10	8 October 2019	Ato Boldon Stadium, Couva, Trinidad and Tobago	Antigua and Barbuda	9–0	10–0	2020 CONCACAF Women's Olympic Qualifying Championship qualification
