= Kayla Taylor =

Trinidad and Tobago footballer

Personal information
- Date of birth: 27 October 1994 (age 32)
- Height: 1.65 m (5 ft 5 in)
- Position: Midfielder

Senior career*
Years	Team	Apps	(Gls)
- Wiley College

International career^{‡}
2016–2018	Trinidad and Tobago	8	(7)
- * Club domestic league appearances and goals ‡ National team caps and goals as of 4 October 2018

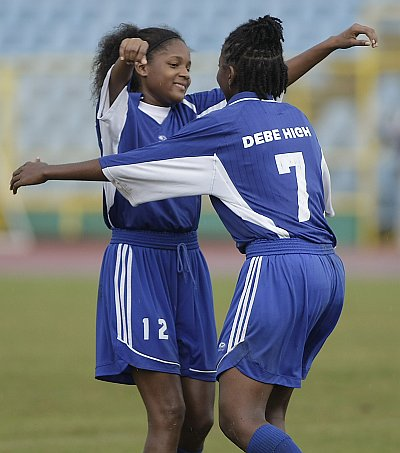
Kayla Tylor, number 12, hugging a teammate while wearing Debe Secondary School soccer uniforms

Kayla Taylor (born 27 October 1994) is a Trinidad and Tobago women's international footballer who plays as a midfielder. She was a member of the Trinidad and Tobago women's national football team. She was part of the team at the 2016 CONCACAF Women's Olympic Qualifying Tournament. At the collegiate level, she plays for Wiley College in the United States.

== International goals ==
Scores and results list Trinidad and Tobago's goal tally first

No.	Date	Venue	Opponent	Score	Result	Competition
1	25 August 2018	National Stadium, Kingston, Jamaica	Cuba	1–0	3–2	2018 CONCACAF Women's Championship qualification
2	25 August 2018	National Stadium, Kingston, Jamaica	Cuba	2–1	3–2	2018 CONCACAF Women's Championship qualification
3	25 August 2018	National Stadium, Kingston, Jamaica	Cuba	3–1	3–2	2018 CONCACAF Women's Championship qualification
4	29 August 2018	National Stadium, Kingston, Jamaica	Antigua and Barbuda	2–0	5–0	2018 CONCACAF Women's Championship qualification
5	29 August 2018	National Stadium, Kingston, Jamaica	Antigua and Barbuda	4–0	5–0	2018 CONCACAF Women's Championship qualification
6	31 August 2018	National Stadium, Kingston, Jamaica	Jamaica	1–0	1–4	2018 CONCACAF Women's Championship qualification
7	2 September 2018	National Stadium, Kingston, Jamaica	Bermuda	1–0	3–0	2018 CONCACAF Women's Championship qualification
