= Janine François =

Trinidad and Tobago footballer

Personal information
- Full name: Janine François
- Date of birth: 1 January 1989 (age 37)
- Place of birth: Trinidad and Tobago
- Height: 1.57 m (5 ft 2 in)
- Positions: Forward; midfielder

College career
Years	Team	Apps	(Gls)
2006–2009	South Carolina State Lady Bulldogs	18+	(9+)

International career^{‡}
2010–2019	Trinidad and Tobago	51	(7)
- ‡ National team caps and goals as of 10 October 2019

Janine François (born 1 January 1989) is a Trinidadian football midfielder.

== International goals ==
Scores and results list Trinidad and Tobago' goal tally first.

No.	Date	Venue	Opponent	Score	Result	Competition
1	5 July 2011	Estadio Panamericano, San Cristóbal, Dominican Republic	Bermuda	4–1	5–1	2012 CONCACAF Women's Olympic Qualifying Tournament qualification
2	20 August 2014	Hasely Crawford Stadium, Port of Spain, Trinidad and Tobago	Saint Kitts and Nevis	8–0	10–0	2014 CFU Women's Caribbean Cup
3	20 August 2014	Hasely Crawford Stadium, Port of Spain, Trinidad and Tobago	Saint Kitts and Nevis	9–0	10–0	2014 CFU Women's Caribbean Cup
4	27 May 2018	Ato Boldon Stadium, Couva, Trinidad and Tobago	Grenada	7–0	13–0	2018 CONCACAF Women's Championship qualification
5	27 May 2018	Ato Boldon Stadium, Couva, Trinidad and Tobago	Grenada	9–0	13–0	2018 CONCACAF Women's Championship qualification
6	29 August 2018	National Stadium, Kingston, Jamaica	Antigua and Barbuda	1–0	5–0	2018 CONCACAF Women's Championship qualification
7	30 September 2019	Ato Boldon Stadium, Couva, Trinidad and Tobago	Aruba	3–0	3–0	2020 CONCACAF Women's Olympic Qualifying Championship qualification
