= María Isabel Pérez (footballer) =

Cuban footballer

Personal information
- Full name: María Isabel Pérez Torres
- Date of birth: 7 September 1992 (age 34)
- Position: Midfielder

Senior career*
Years	Team	Apps	(Gls)
- Camagüey

International career
2009–2012	Cuba U-20	11	(3)
2010–	Cuba	11	(3)
- * Club domestic league appearances and goals

María Isabel Pérez Torres (born 7 September 1992) is a Cuban footballer who plays as a midfielder for the Cuba women's national team. In the Cuban football league, she plays for Camagüey, her province's squad.

== International goals ==
No.	Date	Venue	Opponent	Score	Result	Competition
1.	15 May 2010	Manny Ramjohn Stadium, Marabella, Trinidad and Tobago	Antigua and Barbuda	6–0	6–1	2010 CONCACAF Women's World Cup Qualifying qualification
2.	23 August 2015	Estadio Panamericano, San Cristóbal, Dominican Republic	Guyana	1–1	1–1	2016 CONCACAF Women's Olympic Qualifying Championship qualification
3.	5 May 2018	Estadio Panamericano, San Cristóbal, Dominican Republic	Dominican Republic	3–1	5–1	2018 CONCACAF Women's Championship qualification
4.	7 May 2018	Estadio Panamericano, San Cristóbal, Dominican Republic	Aruba	1–0	11–0	2018 CONCACAF Women's Championship qualification
5.	7 May 2018	Estadio Panamericano, San Cristóbal, Dominican Republic	Aruba	5–0	11–0	2018 CONCACAF Women's Championship qualification
6.	7 May 2018	Estadio Panamericano, San Cristóbal, Dominican Republic	Aruba	6–0	11–0	2018 CONCACAF Women's Championship qualification
7.	13 May 2018	Estadio Panamericano, San Cristóbal, Dominican Republic	Anguilla	2–0	4–0	2018 CONCACAF Women's Championship qualification
8.	27 August 2018	National Stadium, Kingston, Jamaica	Antigua and Barbuda	1–0	7–0	2018 CONCACAF Women's Championship qualification
9.	27 August 2018	National Stadium, Kingston, Jamaica	Antigua and Barbuda	3–0	7–0	2018 CONCACAF Women's Championship qualification
10.	29 August 2018	National Stadium, Kingston, Jamaica	Bermuda	2–0	2–0	2018 CONCACAF Women's Championship qualification
11.	2 September 2018	National Stadium, Kingston, Jamaica	Jamaica	1–6	1–6	2018 CONCACAF Women's Championship qualification
12.	2 October 2019	National Stadium, Kingston, Jamaica	Barbados	6–1	6–1	2020 CONCACAF Women's Olympic Qualifying Championship qualification
13.	19 February 2022	Estadio General Francisco Morazán, San Pedro Sula, Honduras	British Virgin Islands	9–0	14–0	2022 CONCACAF W Championship qualification
