= Bianca Canizio =

U.S. Virgin Islands soccer player (born 1994)

Personal information
- Date of birth: February 14, 1994 (age 32)
- Height: 5 ft 3 in (1.60 m)
- Positions: Forward; midfielder

Youth career
- Murphy Bulldogs

College career
Years	Team	Apps	(Gls)
2012–2016	Warren Wilson Owls	52	(44)

International career^{‡}
2018–	United States Virgin Islands	7	(1)
- ‡ National team caps and goals as of April 6, 2022

Bianca Canizio (born February 14, 1994) is a U.S. Virgin Islands soccer player who has played as a forward and served as team captain for the United States Virgin Islands women's national team.

== Early life and education ==
Growing up in Coral Springs, Florida, Canizio played American football until the sixth grade, inspired by her older brother. During her second season, she played for the Coral Springs Chargers' 105-pound tackle football team as a starting right guard.

She later attended Murphy High School in Murphy, North Carolina, where she played on the school's co-ed soccer team after the girls' team was cut. Named the Murphy Bulldogs' most valuable player in 2011, she also named to the All-Smoky Mountain Conference team. She graduated in 2012.

== College career ==
Canizio attended Warren Wilson College in Swannanoa, North Carolina, where she played as a forward and midfielder for the Owls. As a freshman midfielder in 2013, she scored for Warren Wilson against the United States Virgin Islands "select" soccer team in the 80th minute, equalizing for a final score of 2–2.

In 2015, Canizio was recognized as a college All-American for a third time by the United States Collegiate Athletic Association, after scoring 10 goals and logging 2 assists during the season. At the time, she had a career total of 44 goals and 14 assists.

== Club career ==
After graduating from college, Canizio signed with the Asheville City Soccer Women's team in western North Carolina for their inaugural season in 2018.

== International career ==
Canizio capped for the United States Virgin Islands national team at senior level during two CONCACAF W Championship qualifications (2018 and 2022) and the 2020 CONCACAF Women's Olympic Qualifying Championship qualification. She has served as team captain and played as a forward.
