= Ashleigh Shim =

Jamaican footballer (born 1993)

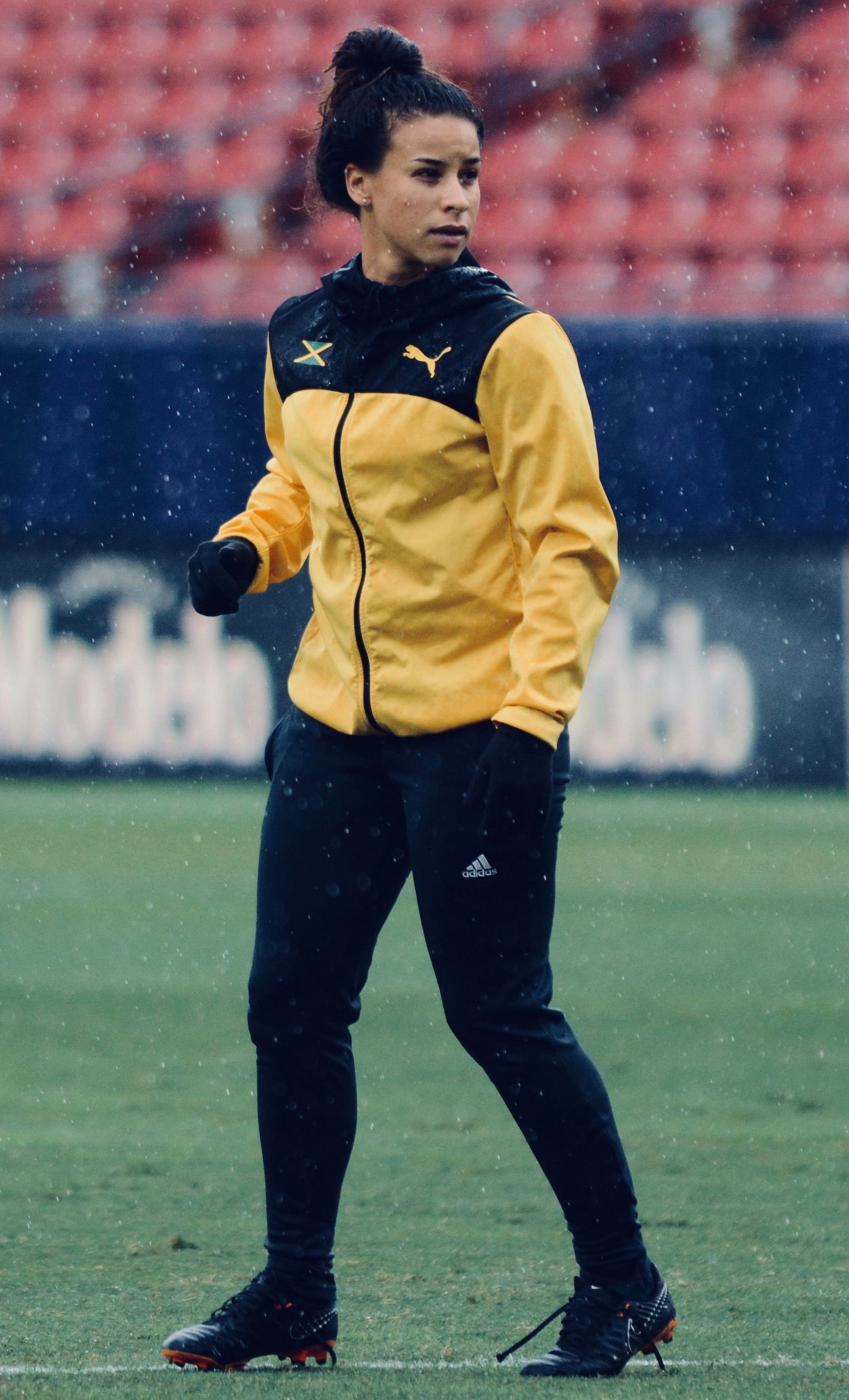

Personal information
- Full name: Ashleigh Jerise Shim
- Date of birth: 11 November 1993 (age 33)
- Place of birth: Kingston, Jamaica
- Height: 1.63 m (5 ft 4 in)
- Position: Forward

College career
Years	Team	Apps	(Gls)
2011–2014	FIU Panthers	81	(17)

Senior career*
Years	Team	Apps	(Gls)
2016	VfL Sindelfingen	11	(6)
2016	FC Djursholm		(3)

International career^{‡}
2009	Cayman Islands U-17	5	(5)
2015–2019	Jamaica	13	(1)
Medal record
Representing Jamaica
CONCACAF W Championship
Third place	2018 United States
- * Club domestic league appearances and goals ‡ National team caps and goals as of 04:00, 12 June 2019

Ashleigh Jerise Shim (born 11 November 1993) is a Jamaican footballer who plays as a forward for the Jamaica national team. She also holds British citizenship of the Cayman Islands.

== College career ==
Shim played as a forward with FIU Panthers during 2011–2014. During her time there, she scored 17 goals and made 13 assists.

== Club career ==
In 2016, Shim played for VfL Sindelfingen and FC Djursholm.

== International career ==
Shim, who is of Caymanian descent through her grandmother, represented Cayman Islands at the 2009 Caribbean Football Union Women's Under-17 Tournament.

Shim switched allegiance to Jamaica in 2015 and competed at the 2016 CONCACAF Women's Olympic Qualifying Championship qualification and the 2018 CONCACAF Women's Championship qualification. Shim made her debut with the Jamaica national team on 25 August 2015, versus the Dominican Republic.

Shim was selected for Jamaica's 2019 FIFA Women's World Cup squad. She never made her World Cup debut. Shim retired in September 2019 with an announcement made via her Instagram story.

== Career statistics ==
Scores and results list Jamaica's goal tally first

No.	Date	Venue	Opponent	Score	Result	Competition
1	25 August 2018	National Stadium, Kingston, Jamaica	Antigua and Barbuda	7–0	9–0	2018 CONCACAF Women's Championship qualification
