= Rachel Blankenship =

American soccer player (born 1995)

Personal information
- Full name: Rachel Thun Ríos
- Date of birth: September 2, 1995 (age 31)
- Place of birth: Oklahoma City, Oklahoma, United States
- Height: 5 ft 6 in (1.68 m)
- Position: Midfielder

College career
| Years | Team | Apps | (Gls) |
| 2014–2017 | Tulsa Golden Hurricane | 75 | (31) |

Senior career*
| Years | Team | Apps | (Gls) |
| 2018–2019 | Fortuna Tulsa | 11 | (4) |

International career
| 2017–2021 | Puerto Rico | 10 | (1) |

Managerial career
- 2021–2022: Tulsa Golden Hurricane (assistant)
- * Club domestic league appearances and goals

Rachel Hannah Blankenship or Rachel Thun Ríos (née Thun; born September 2, 1995), is an American soccer player who played as a midfielder for Fortuna Tulsa in the Women's Premier Soccer League and for the Puerto Rico national team.

== Career ==
Blankenship played college soccer at the University of Tulsa from 2014 to 2017. For the 2014 season, she was named as the American Athletic Conference Rookie of the Year. In 2016, she was named the American Athletic Conference Midfielder of the Year. She was selected to the American Athletic Conference First Team All-Conference in 2014, 2015, 2016, and 2017. She is the first player in TU history to be tabbed to the American Athletic Conference First Team all four years.

Blankenship was Tulsa's Offensive Player of the Year in 2014, 2015, 2016, and 2017. She was also the recipient of The National Academic Momentum Award in 2016, and was awarded The University of Tulsa Ultimate Team Award in 2017 and 2018. Rachel was named to the American Athletic Conference All-Academic Team in 2015, 2016, and 2017 and was a nominee for the Senior CLASS Award in 2017.

She joined Fortuna Tulsa in 2018.

== International career ==
Blankenship's maternal grandparents, the Ríos family, are from Puerto Rico. Having been born in Oklahoma City, she was therefore eligible to play for the United States or Puerto Rico. She chose the latter in 2017.

She played for Puerto Rico at 2018 CONCACAF Women's Championship qualification.

Blankenship traveled to Uruguay in June 2021 to play in friendly matches against the Uruguay National Team. She was accompanied by her husband and 6 month old daughter and is the first mother to play for the Puerto Rican National Team.

== Personal life ==
She married Malachi Blankenship in June 2017 and has two children, River (born November 12, 2020) and Barek (born September 25, 2022). Blankenship currently holds the position as Assistant Coach for The University of Tulsa Women's Soccer Team in Tulsa, Oklahoma where she and her husband are active members of their church and the Tulsa community.
