= Jazmín Elizondo =

Costa Rican footballer (born 1994)

Personal information
- Full name: Jazmín María Elizondo Villalobos
- Date of birth: 16 December 1994 (age 31)
- Place of birth: Costa Rica
- Position: Forward

Team information
- Current team: Herediano

Senior career*
Years	Team	Apps	(Gls)
- Herediano

International career^{‡}
2010	Costa Rica U17	5	(0)
2014	Costa Rica U20	2	(0)
2020–	Costa Rica	1	(1)
- * Club domestic league appearances and goals as of 01:46, 29 January 2020 (UTC) ‡ National team caps and goals as of 01:46, 29 January 2020 (UTC)

Jazmín María Elizondo Villalobos (born 16 December 1994) is a Costa Rican footballer who plays as a forward for Herediano and the Costa Rica women's national team.

== Career ==
Elizondo made her international debut for Costa Rica on 28 January 2020 in the 2020 CONCACAF Women's Olympic Qualifying Championship against Panama. She came on as a substitute in the 74th minute for Melissa Herrera and scored the final goal of the match, which finished as a 6–1 win.

== International goals ==
No.	Date	Venue	Opponent	Score	Result	Competition	Ref.
1	January 29, 2020	BBVA Stadium, Houston, Texas, United States	Panama	6–1	6–1	2020 CONCACAF Women's Olympic Qualifying Championship	
