= Lauren Silver =

Jamaican footballer (born 1993)

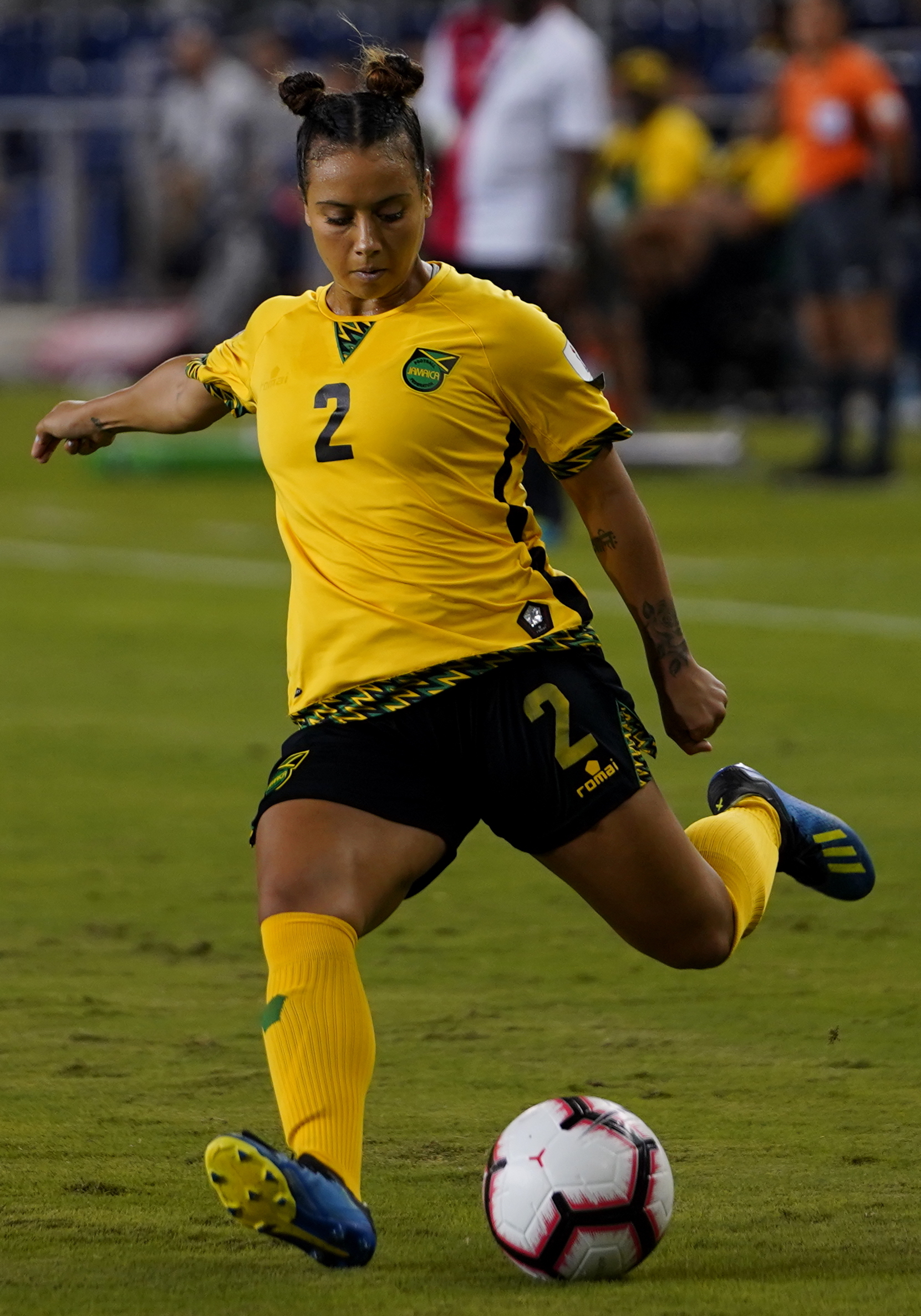

Personal information
- Full name: Lauren Amanda Silver
- Date of birth: 22 March 1993 (age 33)
- Place of birth: Miami, Florida, United States
- Height: 1.57 m (5 ft 2 in)
- Positions: Defender; midfielder

College career
Years	Team	Apps	(Gls)
2011–2014	Florida Gators	82	(3)

Senior career*
Years	Team	Apps	(Gls)
2015	Houston Dash	0	(0)
2015	Bollstanäs SK	5	(0)
2016–2017	Metz	4	(0)
2017	Glasgow City	5	(1)
2019	Trondheims-Ørn	1	(0)
2020	Houston Dash	0	(0)

International career^{‡}
2014–	Jamaica	24	(1)
Medal record
Representing Jamaica
CONCACAF W Championship
Third place	2018 United States
- * Club domestic league appearances and goals as of 26, February 2020 (UTC) ‡ National team caps and goals as of 04:10, 12 June 2019 (UTC)

Lauren Amanda Silver (born 22 March 1993) is an American-born Jamaican professional footballer who last played as a defender for Houston Dash of the National Women's Soccer League (NWSL) and the Jamaica women's national football team.

== Early life ==
Silver was born in Miami, Florida, on 22 March 1993. Her parents were both marathon runners, while her sister also played soccer and encouraged her to take up the sport. She attended American Heritage School in Delray Beach, Florida, where she won state soccer championships in 2010 and 2011. She joined the US Youth Soccer Olympic Development Program in 2008.

== College career ==
Between 2011 and 2014, Silver attended the University of Florida and played on the Florida Gators women's soccer team.

== Club career ==
Silver joined the Houston Dash of the National Women's Soccer League (NWSL) as a trialist during their 2015 pre-season. She went on to sign with Bollstanäs SK in Sweden's second division Elitettan, where she was a starting player in eight matches and scored one goal during the 2015 season. She scored a goal for the team during the 2015 Swedish Women's Cup.

Silver joined NWSL team, FC Kansas City, on their 2016 pre-season roster. She played for French Division 1 Féminine club, FC Metz, making four appearances, before joining Glasgow City of the Scottish Women's Premier League in March 2017. She left the club two months later, having reportedly failed to adapt to the conditions in Scotland. She signed a one-year professional contract with Norwegian Toppserien club SK Trondheims-Ørn in February 2019. She rejoined Houston Dash on a short-term contract in September 2020.

== International career ==
Although born in the United States, Silver qualified to represent Jamaica through her maternal grandfather. She made her international debut in the 2014 CONCACAF Women's Championship. In 2019, she was named to the squad to represent Jamaica at their first FIFA Women's World Cup in France. She made her tournament debut during the team's 5–0 loss against Italy in the group stage.

=== International goals ===
Scores and results list Jamaica's goal tally first

No.	Date	Venue	Opponent	Score	Result	Competition
1	September 2, 2018	National Stadium, Kingston, Jamaica	Cuba	3–0	6–1	2018 CONCACAF Women's Championship qualification
