= Krysan St. Louis =

Saint Lucian footballer

Personal information
- Date of birth: 4 April 2003 (age 23)
- Position: Forward

Team information
- Current team: Texas A&M International Dustdevils
- Number: 26

College career
Years	Team	Apps	(Gls)
2020–	Texas A&M International Dustdevils	74	(20)

International career^{‡}
2020	Saint Lucia U20	1	(0)
2019	Saint Lucia	4	(3)
- ‡ National team caps and goals as of 29 February 2020.

Krysan St. Louis (born 4 April 2003) is a Saint Lucian footballer who plays as a forward for American college team Texas A&M International Dustdevils. She has been a member of the Saint Lucia women's national team.

== Early life and education ==
St. Louis was raised in Vieux Fort. She has attended the Vieux Fort Comprehensive Secondary School.

== College career ==
St. Louis has attended the Texas A&M International University in the United States.

== Club career ==
St. Louis joined Chattanooga FC of the Women's Premier Soccer League in 2023.

== International career ==
St. Louis represented Saint Lucia at the 2020 CONCACAF Women's U-20 Championship. She capped at senior level during the 2020 CONCACAF Women's Olympic Qualifying Championship qualification.

=== International goals ===
Scores and results list Saint Lucia goal tally first

No.	Date	Venue	Opponent	Score	Result	Competition	Ref.
1	8 October 2019	National Stadium, Kingston, Jamaica	Cuba	1–4	1–6	2020 CONCACAF Women's Olympic Qualifying Championship qualification	
