= Reilly Paterson =

US-raised Jamaican footballer (born 2000)

Personal information
- Date of birth: 22 August 2000 (age 26)
- Place of birth: Temecula, California
- Height: 1.57 m (5 ft 2 in)
- Position: Midfielder

Team information
- Current team: Evansville Purple Aces
- Number: 8

Youth career
- 2014–2017: Great Oak High School

College career
Years	Team	Apps	(Gls)
2018–2019	Notre Dame de Namur Argonauts	23	(1)
2020–2022	Evansville Purple Aces	12	(0)

International career^{‡}
2019–	Jamaica	1	(1)
- ‡ National team caps and goals as of 30 September 2019

Reilly Paterson (born 22 August 2000) is a US-raised Jamaican footballer who plays as a midfielder for the Evansville Purple Aces and the Jamaica women's national team.

== Early life ==
Paterson was raised in Temecula, California.

== International career ==
Paterson made her senior debut for Jamaica on 30 September 2019.

=== International goals ===
Scores and results list Jamaica's goal tally first

No.	Date	Venue	Opponent	Score	Result	Competition
1	30 September 2019	National Stadium, Kingston, Jamaica	Cuba	9–1	12–1	2020 CONCACAF Women's Olympic Qualifying Championship qualification
