= Marcela Robinson =

Puerto Rican footballer (born 1997)

Personal information
- Full name: Marcela Robinson García
- Date of birth: 7 January 1997 (age 29)
- Place of birth: United States
- Height: 1.75 m (5 ft 9 in)
- Positions: Central defender; midfielder

College career
Years	Team	Apps	(Gls)
2015–2019	La Salle Explorers	43	(4)

International career^{‡}
2018–	Puerto Rico	4	(1)
- ‡ National team caps and goals as of 11 May 2018

Marcela Robinson García (born 7 January 1997) is a Puerto Rican international footballer who plays as a central defender for the Puerto Rico women's national team.

== International career ==
Robinson was eligible to play for the United States or Puerto Rico, as she was born in the States to a Puerto Rican mother.

Robinson debuted for Puerto Rico on 5 May 2018 against Anguilla.

=== International goals ===
Scores and results list Puerto Rico's goal tally first

No.	Date	Venue	Opponent	Score	Result	Competition
1	5 May 2018	Estadio Panamericano, Dominican Republic, Dominican Republic	Anguilla	10–0	10–0	2018 CONCACAF Women's Championship qualification
