= Debe Secondary School =

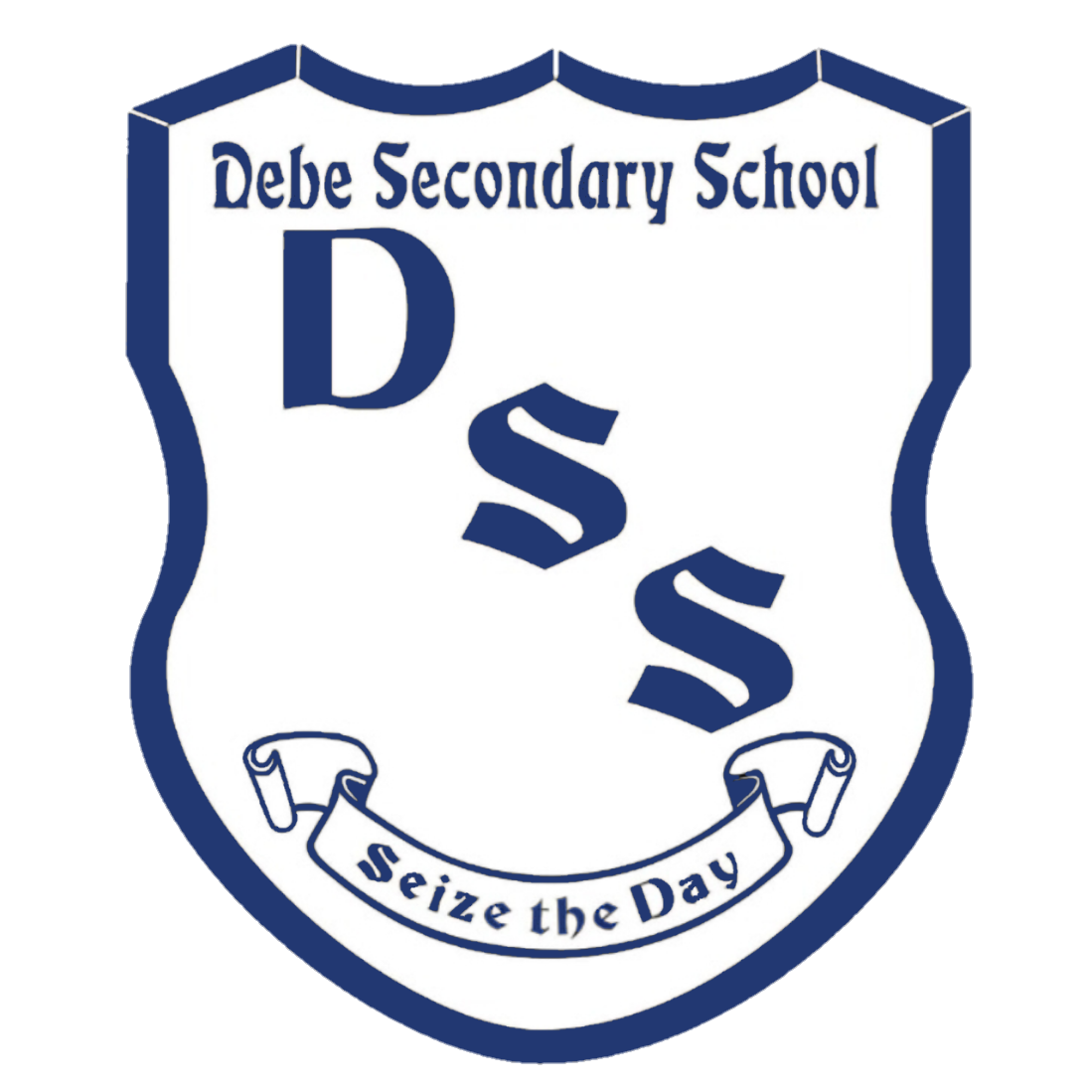

- Debe Secondary School courtyard in 2008.

Location
- M2 Ring Road; Monkey Town, Debe; Victoria, Trinidad and Tobago; 10°13′3″N 61°27′3″W PDD 4137

Information
- Former name: Debe High
- Type: Public co-educational
- Motto: Carpe Diem (Seize the Day)
- Established: 2000
- School district: Victoria Educational District
- School number: (868) 647-2405
- Principal: Trinidad Buller
- Forms: 1 to 6
- Age: 10 to 18
- Enrollment: ~568
- Hours in school day: 6
- Campus: Urban
- Houses: Scarlet Ibis; Blue Jays; Hummingbird; Keskidee
- Colors: White; Navy blue
- Song: "Seizing the Day"

Debe Secondary School is a co-educational public high school situated in Debe, South Trinidad. It was among the first ten schools established in 2000 under the Secondary Education Modernization Programme (SEMP), a project initiated by the Ministry of Education of the Government of the Republic of Trinidad and Tobago with the aim to modernize and reform the secondary education system, including improving access to educational opportunities for all children in Trinidad and Tobago. Initially a 5-year secondary school, its academic success within its first five years led to the introduction of CAPE sixth form classes, thereby extending its offerings from forms 1 to 6.

== Present day ==
Debe Secondary School is considered one of the top schools in South Trinidad. It is in high demand for transfers and placements and is regarded as a first-choice school by many. The school is led by national award-winning principal Romeo Gunness, who, due to his contribution to education and using "his hands-on experiences to instill the values of hard work, empathy, and sacrifice in his students," was awarded the Hummingbird Silver Medal of the Order of the Trinity. Under his leadership, a cohort of students in 2018 achieved a 100 percent pass rate in the Caribbean Advanced Proficiency Examination (CAPE), and the school recorded an overall 85 percent pass rate at the Caribbean Secondary Education Certificate (CSEC) level.

The school is all-inclusive in its approach to students with special needs, involving them in activities such as annual sporting events with the aim of “introduc[ing] them to the wider community, and the outside world.” These events are also intended to “help to build their social skills” and strengthen “the bond between staff and students because they are out of the classroom in an informal setting,” contributing to “the full development of the child.” Despite past infrastructural challenges, the school has continued to excel academically and in student development.

=== Facilities ===
The school comprises eight blocks:

- Main Student Building – A two-storey structure.
  - The lower floor accommodates Forms 1 and 2 classrooms, as well as the Physical Education room.
  - The upper floor houses Forms 3 and 4 classrooms, along with the Business Lab.
- Administrative Block – Contains the Staff Room, Principal's Office, Vice Principal's Office, Safety Office, and Guidance Office.
- Form 6 Block – Dedicated to sixth form students. The 5S classroom is also located in this block.
- Student Centre – Includes the Library, Reading Room, Computer (I.T.) Lab, and AV Room.
- Toilet Block – Contains student washroom facilities and also accommodates the school's cleaning staff.
- Lab Block – Houses the Biology, Chemistry, and Physics laboratories, as well as the 3H classroom.
- Form 5 Prefab – A standalone unit that accommodates classes 5D and 5H.
- Subject Block – Hosts the Art, Music, and Dance rooms, as well as the Technology Education Lab.

There is also a cafeteria, the main assembly/auditorium hall, and a field that provides ample space for outdoor activities, including basketball and football courts, as well as cricket batting nets.

=== Campus ===
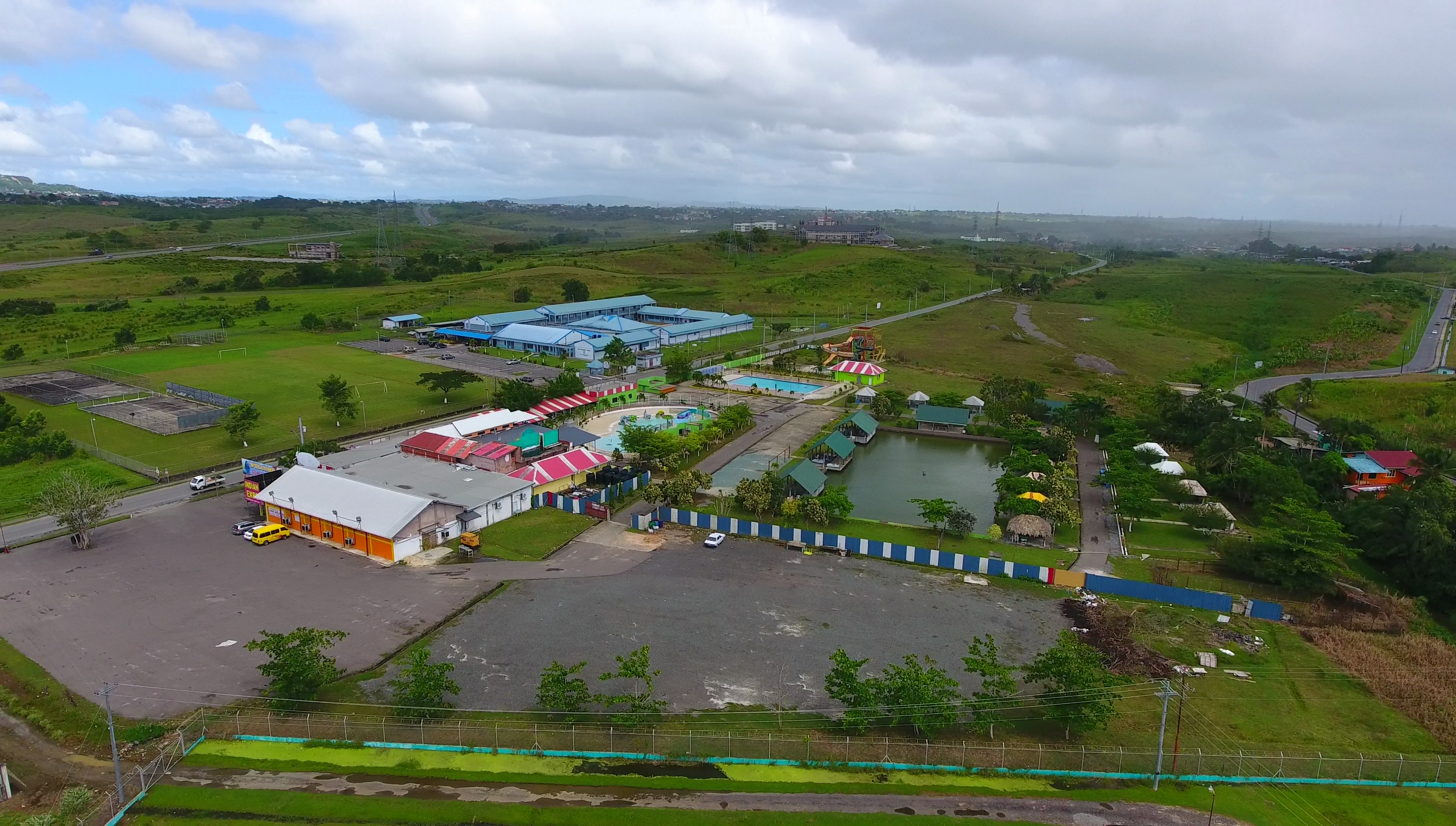
Fun Splash Water Park and Debe Secondary School.

The school is surrounded by a former sugar cane field opposite the Fun Splash water park. It is a quiet school of a population of about 568 students and approximately 40 teachers. Though situated outside the urban area, Debe Secondary School has been highly noted for its discipline and high standards of education. The UWI is being built near the school.

== Admission policy ==
Admission to Debe Secondary School is determined by performance on the Secondary Entrance Assessment (SEA) with the passing percentage ranging from 85% to 55%. The SEA is a 3-hour-10-minute examination described by the Division of Educational Research and Evaluation (DERE) and the Division of Curriculum Development of the Trinidad & Tobago Ministry of Education as "a mechanism that facilitates placement of students in secondary schools in Trinidad and Tobago." The SEA comprises three papers that all candidates must attempt: Creative Writing, Mathematics, and Language Arts. The assessment covers the national curriculum for primary-level education for standards three to five, the final three years of elementary instruction.

Debe Secondary School tends to be an institution of third choice of the five prospective institutions each examinee is required to list in preferential order of interest prior to the exam. The five preferences are drawn from the totality of secondary institutions nationwide.

Students can also be transferred into the school after an entrance exam.

== Curriculum ==
Students at Debe Secondary School pursue a course of instruction leading to external examination under the authority of the Caribbean Examinations Council (CXC). The CXC was established in 1972 by agreement of regional governments seeking an effective and functional model through which to provide and assess a secondary education curriculum reflective of, and sensitive to Caribbean priorities and reality. As a body, the council has an operative relationship with the University of the West Indies and the governments of fifteen (15) participating territories aside from that of the Republic of Trinidad & Tobago. The school's students sit the Caribbean Secondary Education Certificate (CSEC) examination after either five or four years of study.

The CSEC examinations are the accepted and internationally recognised equivalent of the GCE or General Certificate of Education Ordinary Level examinations they replaced. For decades, examinees took GCEs set by the University of Cambridge Local Examinations Syndicate, now known as University of Cambridge International Examinations. However, a preceding generation of students took a version of Cambridge examination known as the Cambridge School Certificate, a precursor of contemporary GCE O'levels.

Gradually, the range of subjects offered by the Caribbean Examinations Council expanded until CSEC exams came to replace the traditional Cambridge GCE exams completely.

In everyday parlance, CSEC examinations are commonly referred to as CXCs because from 1979 to 1998 they constituted the only form of examination offered by the Caribbean Examinations Council. However, the Council later developed the Caribbean Advanced Proficiency Examinations (CAPE) examinations to replace the British Advanced level or A-level exams - as they are known throughout the British Commonwealth. The council's rationale for the change was predicated on the same basis as that supporting the curricular adjustments leading to the introduction of the CSEC. CAPE examinations are taken by students who have completed their standard secondary education (the CSEC) and who seek to continue their studies, beyond the minimum age for completion of compulsory education. Students who wish to sit for the CAPE usually possess CSEC or an equivalent certification.

== Subjects ==
Forms 1–3 - English A, English B, Social Studies, General Science, Mathematics, Spanish, Computer Studies, Technology Education, Physical Education, Music, Theatre Arts, History, Art & Craft, R.I and Library.

Forms 4–5 - All students are required to choose 5 elective subjects out of 8 for the Caribbean Examinations Council (CXC) exams. Maths, English, and Literature are compulsory. These subjects might include P.O.A, P.O.B, Physics, Biology, Chemistry, History, Geography, Additional Maths, Office Procedures and Agricultural Science.

Forms 5–6 - M.O.B., Environmental Science, History, Accounting, Sociology, Caribbean Studies, Literatures in English, Computer, Computer Studies, Biology, Chemistry, Physics and Mathematics.

== House system ==
The school population is divided among four houses, upon entrance into Form 1 and remain in their assigned house though their tenure at the school. The four houses are:

- Scarlet Ibis
- Blue Jays
- Hummingbird
- Keskidee

The house system is mostly irrelevant to daily school life, however, they do come into play during annual sporting events.

== Sports ==
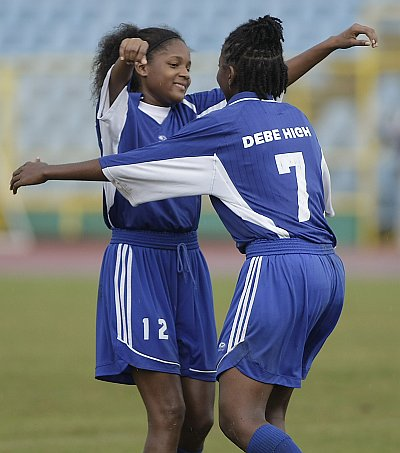
Kayla Tylor, number 12, hugging a teammate.

The school is renowned for nurturing talented female footballers in Trinidad and Tobago and appears poised to continue their dominance in the Secondary Schools Football League for years to come. The school has consistently claimed the National League, Intercol, and South Zone championships. Notably, they have also developed numerous national players, including goalkeeper Linfah Jones, Kayla Taylor, and Patrice Vincent, who represented Trinidad and Tobago at the 2010 FIFA Under-17 Women's World Cup.

In 2012, Debe Secondary School won the BGTT/First Citizens Girls Intercol South Zone title by defeating Vessigny Secondary 3–2 in the championship match at Manny Ramjohn Stadium, with Kayla Taylor scoring a hat-trick with goals in the 25th, 60th, and 75th minutes. This victory served as revenge for their loss to Vessigny in 2011 and was their second title of the season, having also won the zonal League trophy the previous week. The team had also previously won the South Zone title in 2008, 2009, and 2010.

In the same year, Debe Secondary School completed a remarkable season with 13 consecutive victories, securing multiple prestigious titles including the South Zone league title, the Big Four championship, and the Trinidad InterCol title. Kayla Taylor played a pivotal role throughout the season despite battling a shoulder injury. She notably scored crucial goals in the finals, including a brace against St Augustine in the Trinidad InterCol final and pivotal goals in other matches. Following their local triumphs, Debe High School aimed to continue their winning streak by competing in the National InterCol final against Tobago champions Bishop's High, demonstrating their ambition for further success at the national level.
