= Donya Salomon-Ali =

Haitian footballer (born 1993)

Personal information
- Date of birth: 22 February 1993 (age 33)
- Place of birth: LaSalle, Quebec, Canada
- Height: 1.78 m (5 ft 10 in)
- Position: Defender

College career
Years	Team	Apps	(Gls)
2012–2013	Moncton Aigles Bleus	?	(15)
2014–2015	Louisiana Tech Lady Techsters	38	(6)

Senior career*
Years	Team	Apps	(Gls)
2017–2019	AO Trikala 2011		

International career^{‡}
2018–	Haiti	2+	(1)
- * Club domestic league appearances and goals ‡ National team caps and goals as of 17 January 2022

Donya Salomon-Ali (born 22 February 1993) is a Canadian-born Haitian footballer who plays as a defender for the Haiti women's national team.

== Early life ==
Salomon-Ali was born to an Iraqi mother and a Haitian father.

== Club career ==
In August 2017, Salomon-Ali joined Greek club AO Trikala 2011.

== International goals ==
Scores and results list Haiti's goal tally first

No.	Date	Venue	Opponent	Score	Result	Competition
1	9 May 2018	Stade Sylvio Cator, Port-au-Prince, Haiti	Martinique	1–0	2–0	2018 CONCACAF Women's Championship qualification
