= Romelcia Phillip =

Dominica footballer

Personal information
- Date of birth: 29 August 1998 (age 28)
- Place of birth: Roseau, Dominica
- Height: 1.63 m (5 ft 4 in)
- Position: Forward

College career
Years	Team	Apps	(Gls)
2017–2019	LSU–Alexandria Generals		

International career^{‡}
2011	Dominica U17	1	(1)
2018–	Dominica	4	(1)
- ‡ National team caps and goals as of 12 April 2022.

Romelcia Phillip (born 29 August 1998) is a Dominican footballer who plays as a forward for the Dominica women's national team.

== International career ==
Phillip represented Dominica during the 2012 CONCACAF Women's U-17 Championship qualification. She capped at senior level during two CONCACAF W Championship qualifications (2018 and 2022).
