= Cameo Hazlewood =

Guyanese footballer

Personal information
- Place of birth: Peoria, Illinois
- Height: 1.68 m (5 ft 6 in)
- Position: Forward

Youth career
- Dunlap Eagles

College career
Years	Team	Apps	(Gls)
2015–2016	Penn Quakers	24	(2)

International career^{‡}
2018	Guyana	2+	(1)
- ‡ National team caps and goals as of 25 May 2018.

Cameo Hazlewood is an American-raised Guyanese footballer who plays as a forward for the Guyana women's national team.

== Early life ==
Hazlewood was raised in Peoria, Illinois, and attended Dunlap High School in Dunlap, Illinois, where she set school records in the 100 m and 200 m.

== College career ==
Hazlewood played college soccer at the University of Pennsylvania in Philadelphia.

== International career ==
Hazlewood capped for Guyana at senior level during the 2018 CONCACAF Women's Championship qualification.

=== International goals ===
Scores and results list Guyana's goal tally first

No.	Date	Venue	Opponent	Score	Result	Competition	Ref.
1	23 May 2018	Synthetic Track and Field Facility, Leonora, Guyana	Bermuda	2–2	2–2	2018 CONCACAF Women's Championship qualification	

== See also ==
- List of Guyana women's international footballers
