= Trudi Carter =

Jamaican footballer (born 1994)

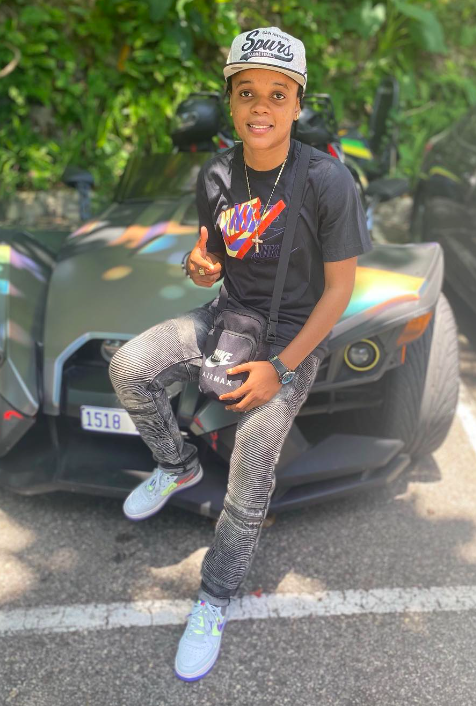
- Carter in 2021

Personal information
- Full name: Trudi Sudan Carter
- Date of birth: 18 November 1994 (age 31)
- Place of birth: Kingston, Jamaica
- Height: 1.57 m (5 ft 2 in)
- Position: Attacking midfielder

Team information
- Current team: Tijuana
- Number: 18

College career
Years	Team	Apps	(Gls)
2013–2014	Navarro College	22+	(54)
2015–2016	South Florida Bulls	40	(7)

Senior career*
Years	Team	Apps	(Gls)
2018	Roma	2	(0)
2021–2022	Gintra	16	(17)
2022–2023	Levante Las Planas	4	(0)
2023–2024	Atlético San Luis	26	(7)
2024–2025	Espanyol	4	(0)
2025–2026	León	14	(3)
2026–	Tijuana	0	(0)

International career^{‡}
2009–2010	Jamaica U17	6	(8)
2009–2012	Jamaica U20	15	(4)
2018–	Jamaica	23	(15)
Medal record
Representing Jamaica
CONCACAF W Championship
Third place	2018 United States
Third place	2022 Mexico
- * Club domestic league appearances and goals as of 9 February 2026 ‡ National team caps and goals as of 5 July 2022

Trudi Sudan Carter (born 18 November 1994) is a Jamaican professional footballer who plays as a forward for Liga MX Femenil club Tijuana and the Jamaica women's national team.

== College career ==
Carter attended and played football at the University of South Florida.

== Club career ==
In 2018, Carter signed with AS Roma women's team

== International career ==
Carter plays for the Jamaica women's senior national team.

=== International goals ===
Scores and results list Jamaica's goal tally first

No.	Date	Venue	Opponent	Score	Result	Competition	Ref.
1	11 May 2018	Stade Sylvio Cator, Port-au-Prince, Haiti	Martinique	2–0	3–0	2018 CONCACAF Women's Championship qualification	
2	13 May 2018	Stade Sylvio Cator, Port-au-Prince, Haiti	Haiti	1–2	2–2	2018 CONCACAF Women's Championship qualification	
3	25 August 2018	National Stadium, Kingston, Jamaica	Antigua and Barbuda	2–0	9–0	2018 CONCACAF Women's Championship qualification	
4	27 August 2018	National Stadium, Kingston, Jamaica	Bermuda	1–0	4–0	2018 CONCACAF Women's Championship qualification	
10	4 February 2020	H-E-B Park, Edinburg, United States	Saint Kitts and Nevis	5–0	7–0	2020 CONCACAF Women's Olympic Qualifying Championship	
11	17 February 2022	National Stadium, Kingston, Jamaica	Bermuda	2–0	4–0	2022 CONCACAF W Championship qualification	
12	9 April 2022	Truman Bodden Stadium, George Town, Cayman Islands	Cayman Islands	1–0	9–0	2022 CONCACAF W Championship qualification	
13	9 April 2022	Truman Bodden Stadium, George Town, Cayman Islands	Cayman Islands	4–0	9–0	2022 CONCACAF W Championship qualification	
14	9 April 2022	Truman Bodden Stadium, George Town, Cayman Islands	Cayman Islands	5–0	9–0	2022 CONCACAF W Championship qualification	
15	12 April 2022	Sabina Park Stadium, Kingston, Jamaica	Dominican Republic	2–1	5–1	2022 CONCACAF W Championship qualification	
16	11 July 2022	Estadio BBVA, Guadalupe, Mexico	Haiti	1–0	4–0	2022 CONCACAF W Championship	
