= Ellaisa Marquis =

Saint Lucian footballer

Personal information
- Date of birth: 1 February 1991 (age 35)
- Height: 1.65 m (5 ft 5 in)
- Position: Midfielder

College career
Years	Team	Apps	(Gls)
2012	Trinidad State Trojans		
2013	MidAmerica Nazarene Pioneers		

Senior career*
Years	Team	Apps	(Gls)
2011	Nemesis FC		
2015	Dennery FC		
2024-	Avenir FC		

International career^{‡}
2009	Saint Lucia U20	4	(1)
2010–	Saint Lucia	7	(3)
- * Club domestic league appearances and goals ‡ National team caps and goals as of 20:38, 18 March 2015 (UTC)

Ellaisa Marquis (born 1 February 1991) is a Saint Lucian footballer who plays as a midfielder for the Saint Lucia women's national team, and has led the team as captain for many years. In 2019, Saint Lucia Star called her Saint Lucia's "marquis player" in women's football. Marquis was awarded the Senior Female Footballer of the Year for 2015 by the St Lucia Football Association (SLFA).

Her most recent international competitions have included the 2020 CONCACAF Women's Olympic Qualifying Championship qualification, and the 2019 Windward Island Senior Women's Tournament, during which she scored the winning goals against St Vincent and the Grenadines, and against Dominica. Since returning from the United States, where she played for the MidAmerica Nazarene Pioneers, Marquis has served as captain of the Dennery senior women's football team, and was named Most Valuable Player in the 2018 SLFA club championship tournament, when Dennery successfully defended the title. She was shortlisted for the National Sports Awards "Sportswoman of the Year" in 2019.

== Early life ==
Marquis was raised in Dennery. She attended the Leon Hess Comprehensive Secondary School. In addition to football, she played basketball and volleyball, and was shortlisted for Saint Lucia sportswoman of the year in 2011. After she received nominations from both the St Lucia Football Association and the St Lucia Basketball Association, the Saint Lucia Star called Marquis "a very unique and special athlete". At the time, she was a member of Nemesis FC of Castries, winners of the National Female Championship.

== College career ==
In 2012, Marquis received a scholarship offer to attend Trinidad State Junior College in Colorado, United States. While playing in the United States in 2013, Marquis was scouted for the Keyano College Huskies women's soccer team in Fort McMurray, Alberta, Canada, along with Saint Lucia teammate Zanique Celestin.

However, that fall, Marquis played for the MidAmerica Nazarene University women's soccer team in Olathe, Kansas, as a junior forward. By the end of November 2013, the MidAmerica Nazarene Pioneers were having their best season in the history of the women's soccer program (13–3–3), with Marquis contributing 7 goals and 8 assists. Marquis was named to the Heart of America Athletic Conference 2013 All-Conference Women's Soccer First Team as a midfielder.

== Club career ==
After her return from the United States, Marquis was the captain of the Dennery senior women's football team, which won the Saint Lucia Football Association championship tournament in 2017 and 2018. At the 2018 SLFA senior women's tournament, Marquis, who played on defense, received awards for Most Valuable Player, as well as Most Goals. Singling out Marquis's performance at the tournament, Ces Podd, assistant general secretary and technical director of the SLFA, told The VOICE, "I am concerned that someone of her ability is not playing professional football in one of the women's teams in the USA or Europe, that is something we have to make sure doesn't happen with our gifted players. We need to try to get them out there. Over the last year I have seen her, she has had an exceptional year."

== International career ==
Saint Lucia placed second in the 2019 Windward Islands Senior Women's Tournament, which was won by St Vincent and the Grenadines (SVG). Captain Marquis had scored the only goal of the first match against SVG on a penalty kick, and also scored the winning goal in the second match against Dominica, which St Lucia won 3–2. During the press conference following the game against Dominica, Marquis said, "I just wanted to keep the team motivated and continue fighting." Although expectations were high that Saint Lucia would win the trophy for the first time in history, Saint Lucia lost against Grenadines and placed second based on goal differential.

In contrast, Saint Lucia had had a last-place finish at the first WIFA women's tournament in 2015, when Marquis – playing as a defensive midfielder – nevertheless managed to share the award for Most Goals with Dominica's Aaliya Titre. Following the 2017 Windward Island Senior Women's Tournament, Marquis was awarded Best Midfielder and was recognized by the SLFA for her "unparalleled" technical level, as well as "her amazing poise and football intelligence".
