= 2020 CONCACAF Women's Olympic Qualifying Championship =

Fifth edition of the CONCACAF Women's Olympic Qualifying Tournament

Tournament details
- Host country: United States
- Dates: 28 January – 9 February
- Teams: 8 (from 1 confederation)
- Venues: 3 (in 3 host cities)

Final positions
- Champions: United States (5th title)
- Runners-up: Canada

Tournament statistics
- Matches played: 15
- Goals scored: 77 (5.13 per match)
- Top scorer: (Canada) Jordyn Huitema (7 goals)
- Best player: (United States) Christen Press
- Best goalkeeper: (Canada) Stephanie Labbé
- Fair play award: United States

The 2020 CONCACAF Women's Olympic Qualifying Championship was the fifth edition of the CONCACAF Women's Olympic Qualifying Tournament, the quadrennial international football tournament organized by CONCACAF to determine which women's national teams from the North, Central American and Caribbean region qualify for the Olympic football tournament. CONCACAF announced on 5 November 2019 that the United States would host the tournament between 28 January to 9 February 2020.

The top two teams qualified for the 2020 Summer Olympics women's football tournament in Japan as the CONCACAF representatives. The United States were the defending champions.

== Qualification ==
The eight berths were allocated to the three regional zones as follows:

- Three teams from the North American Zone (NAFU), i.e., Canada, Mexico and the United States, who all qualified automatically as the only teams in the region.
- Two teams from the Central American Zone (UNCAF)
- Three teams from the Caribbean Zone (CFU)

Regional qualification tournaments were held in Central America and Caribbean to determine the five teams joining Canada, Mexico and the United States at the final tournament.

=== Qualified teams ===
The following eight teams qualified for the final tournament.

Team	Qualification zone	Appearance	Previous best performance	Previous women's Olympic appearances
Canada	North America (automatic)	5th	Runner-up (2008, 2012, 2016)	3
Mexico	North America (automatic)	5th	Runner-up (2004)	1
United States (title holders)	North America (automatic)	5th	Winner (2004, 2008, 2012, 2016)	6
Costa Rica	Central America Group A	5th	Semi-finals (2012)	0
Panama	Central America Group B	2nd	Group stage (2004)	0
Saint Kitts and Nevis	Caribbean Group A	1st	N/A	0
Jamaica	Caribbean Group B	2nd	Group stage (2008)	0
Haiti	Caribbean Group C	2nd	Group stage (2012)	0

== Venues ==
The three venues were announced during the draw ceremony on 7 November 2019.

- Group A: BBVA Stadium, Houston, Texas
- Group B: H-E-B Park, Edinburg, Texas
- Semi-finals and final: Dignity Health Sports Park, Carson, California

Houston, Texas	Edinburg, Texas	Carson, California
BBVA Stadium	H-E-B Park	Dignity Health Sports Park
Capacity: 22,039	Capacity: 9,735	Capacity: 30,510
Location of the host cities of the 2020 CONCACAF Women's Olympic Qualifying Championship.

== Draw ==
The draw for the tournament took place on 7 November 2019, 14:30 EST (UTC−5), at the Mediapro Studio in Miami, Florida, United States.

The eight teams were drawn into two groups of four teams. The teams were seeded into four pots for the draw. Pot 1 contained the United States, seeded in Group A as the host nation. The remaining teams were allocated to the pots based on the FIFA Women's World Rankings of 27 September 2019 (shown in parentheses below).

Pot 1	Pot 2	Pot 3	Pot 4
United States (1) (position A1); Canada (7) (position B1)	Mexico (27); Costa Rica (38)	Jamaica (51); Panama (56)	Haiti (73); Saint Kitts and Nevis (134)

== Group stage ==
The top two teams from each group advance to the semi-finals.

All times are local, CST (UTC−6).

=== Tiebreakers ===
The ranking of teams in the group stage was determined as follows:

1. Points obtained in all group matches (three points for a win, one for a draw, none for a defeat);
2. Goal difference in all group matches;
3. Number of goals scored in all group matches;
4. Drawing of lots.

=== Group A ===
Pos	Team	Pld	W	D	L	GF	GA	GD	Pts	Qualification
1	United States (H)	3	3	0	0	18	0	+18	9	Advance to knockout stage
2	Costa Rica	3	2	0	1	8	7	+1	6	Advance to knockout stage
3	Haiti	3	1	0	2	6	6	0	3	
4	Panama	3	0	0	3	1	20	−19	0	

Source: CONCACAF
(H) Hosts
28 January 2020
17:00

Costa Rica	6–1	Panama
Herrera 9', 72'; R. Rodríguez 16' (pen.); S. Cruz 67'; Chinchilla 70'; Elizondo 83'	Report	Castillo 45'

BBVA Stadium, Houston, Texas
Referee: Lucila Venegas (Mexico)
28 January 2020
19:30

United States	4–0	Haiti
Press 2'; Williams 67'; Horan 73'; Lloyd 90+3'	Report

BBVA Stadium, Houston, Texas
Attendance: 4,363
Referee: Odette Hamilton (Jamaica)

31 January 2020
17:00

Haiti	0–2	Costa Rica
	Report	R. Rodríguez 57', 66'

BBVA Stadium, Houston, Texas
Referee: Francia González (Mexico)
31 January 2020
19:30

Panama	0–8	United States
	Report	Horan 3', 18', 81'; Williams 16'; Lavelle 21'; Press 70'; McDonald 72'; Heath 79'

BBVA Stadium, Houston, Texas
Attendance: 14,121
Referee: Myriam Marcotte (Canada)

3 February 2020
17:00

Panama	0–6	Haiti
	Report	Mondésir 5' (pen.), 84'; Saint-Félix 12', 29'; Dumornay 47'; B. Louis 59'

BBVA Stadium, Houston, Texas
Referee: Myriam Marcotte (Canada)
3 February 2020
19:30

United States	6–0	Costa Rica
Press 4', 36'; Horan 10'; Mewis 63', 83'; McDonald 77'	Report

BBVA Stadium, Houston, Texas
Attendance: 7,082
Referee: Francia González (Mexico)

=== Group B ===
Pos	Team	Pld	W	D	L	GF	GA	GD	Pts	Qualification
1	Canada	3	3	0	0	22	0	+22	9	Advance to knockout stage
2	Mexico	3	2	0	1	7	2	+5	6	Advance to knockout stage
3	Jamaica	3	1	0	2	7	10	−3	3	
4	Saint Kitts and Nevis	3	0	0	3	0	24	−24	0	

Source: CONCACAF
29 January 2020
16:30

Canada	11–0	Saint Kitts and Nevis
Sinclair 7' (pen.), 23'; Leon 12', 26', 43', 80'; Lawrence 18', 57'; Riviere 40'; Fleming 54'; Huitema 74'	Report

H-E-B Park, Edinburg, Texas
Attendance: 820
Referee: Crystal Sobers (Trinidad and Tobago)
29 January 2020
19:00

Mexico	1–0	Jamaica
Cuéllar 36'	Report

H-E-B Park, Edinburg, Texas
Referee: Katja Koroleva (United States)

1 February 2020
14:30

Saint Kitts and Nevis	0–6	Mexico
	Report	Palacios 3'; López 4'; Mayor 9' (pen.); Cuéllar 22', 52'; Mercado 76'

H-E-B Park, Edinburg, Texas
Referee: Tatiana Guzmán (Nicaragua)
1 February 2020
16:30

Jamaica	0–9	Canada
	Report	Huitema 10', 55', 62', 81', 90+3'; Rose 16'; Beckie 44', 51', 66'

H-E-B Park, Edinburg, Texas
Attendance: 2,010
Referee: Melissa Borjas (Honduras)

4 February 2020
17:30

Canada	2–0	Mexico
Sinclair 26'; Zadorsky 45+2'	Report

H-E-B Park, Edinburg, Texas
Referee: Katja Koroleva (United States)
4 February 2020
19:30

Jamaica	7–0	Saint Kitts and Nevis
Shaw 38', 57'; Cameron 40'; Solaun 51'; Carter 68' (pen.); McCoy 70', 85'	Report

H-E-B Park, Edinburg, Texas
Referee: Crystal Sobers (Trinidad and Tobago)

== Knockout stage ==
All times are local, PST (UTC−8).

=== Bracket ===
Semi-finals
7 February – Carson, CA
Canada	1
Costa Rica	0
7 February – Carson, CA
United States	4
Mexico	0

Final
9 February – Carson, CA
Canada	0
United States	3

=== Semi-finals ===
The semi-final winners qualified for the 2020 Summer Olympics.

7 February 2020
16:00

Canada	1–0	Costa Rica
Huitema 72'	Report

Dignity Health Sports Park, Carson, California
Referee: Lucila Venegas (Mexico)

7 February 2020
19:00

United States	4–0	Mexico
Lavelle 5'; Mewis 14', 67'; Press 74'	Report

Dignity Health Sports Park, Carson, California
Attendance: 11,292
Referee: Melissa Borjas (Honduras)

=== Final ===
9 February 2020
15:00

Canada	0–3	United States
	Report	Williams 61'; Horan 71'; Rapinoe 87'

Dignity Health Sports Park, Carson, California
Attendance: 17,489
Referee: Tatiana Guzmán (Nicaragua)

== Goalscorers ==
There were 77 goals scored in 15 matches, for an average of 5.13 goals per match.

7 goals

- (Canada) Jordyn Huitema

6 goals

- (United States) Lindsey Horan

5 goals

- (United States) Christen Press

4 goals

- (Canada) Adriana Leon
- (United States) Sam Mewis

3 goals

- (Canada) Janine Beckie
- (Canada) Christine Sinclair
- (Costa Rica) Raquel Rodríguez
- (Mexico) Renae Cuéllar
- (United States) Lynn Williams

2 goals

- (Canada) Ashley Lawrence
- (Costa Rica) Melissa Herrera
- (Haiti) Nérilia Mondésir
- (Haiti) Mikerline Saint-Félix
- (Jamaica) Kayla McCoy
- (Jamaica) Khadija Shaw
- (United States) Rose Lavelle
- (United States) Jessica McDonald

1 goal

- (Canada) Jessie Fleming
- (Canada) Jayde Riviere
- (Canada) Deanne Rose
- (Canada) Shelina Zadorsky
- (Costa Rica) Priscila Chinchilla
- (Costa Rica) Shirley Cruz
- (Costa Rica) Jazmín Elizondo
- (Haiti) Melchie Dumornay
- (Haiti) Batcheba Louis
- (Jamaica) Tiffany Cameron
- (Jamaica) Trudi Carter
- (Jamaica) Havana Solaun
- (Mexico) Jimena López
- (Mexico) Stephany Mayor
- (Mexico) Liliana Mercado
- (Mexico) Kiana Palacios
- (Panama) Katherine Castillo
- (United States) Tobin Heath
- (United States) Carli Lloyd
- (United States) Megan Rapinoe

== Awards ==
The following awards were given at the conclusion of the tournament.

Award	Winner
Golden Ball	(United States) Christen Press
Golden Boot	(Canada) Jordyn Huitema
Golden Glove	(Canada) Stephanie Labbé
Fair Play Award	United States

CONCACAF also released a "Best XI" of the tournament.

Goalkeeper	Defenders	Midfielders	Forwards
(Canada) Stephanie Labbé	(Canada) Kadeisha Buchanan (Canada) Ashley Lawrence (Costa Rica) Stephannie Blanco (United States) Crystal Dunn	(Costa Rica) Raquel Rodríguez (Haiti) Nérilia Mondésir (United States) Lindsey Horan	(Canada) Jordyn Huitema (Mexico) Renae Cuéllar (United States) Christen Press

== Qualified teams for Summer Olympics ==
The following two teams from CONCACAF qualified for the 2020 Summer Olympic women's football tournament.

Team	Qualified on	Previous appearances in Summer Olympics^{1}
Canada	7 February 2020	3 (2008, 2012, 2016)
United States	7 February 2020	6 (**1996**, 2000, **2004**, **2008**, **2012**, 2016)

^{1} Bold indicates champions for that year. Italic indicates hosts for that year.

== Controversy ==
- In the 19th minute of the group stage match between the United States and Haiti, Haiti's Roseline Éloissaint scored a header from a corner kick. However, the assistant referee signalled that Éloissaint was at an offside position, and Éloissaint's goal was subsequently disallowed. According to the Laws of the Game, there was no offside offense since Éloissaint received the ball directly from a corner kick.
