= Micaela Castain =

Puerto Rican footballer

Personal information
- Full name: Micaela Castain Serrano
- Date of birth: 11 February 1992 (age 34)
- Place of birth: Chicago, Illinois, United States
- Height: 1.65 m (5 ft 5 in)
- Position: Forward

College career
Years	Team	Apps	(Gls)
2010–2013	Washington State Cougars	74	(33)

International career^{‡}
2018–	Puerto Rico	4	(5)

Managerial career
- 2016–2017: Montana Lady Griz (asst.)
- ‡ National team caps and goals as of 11 May 2018

Micaela Castain Serrano (born 11 February 1992) is a Puerto Rican international footballer who plays for the Puerto Rico national team.

== Career ==
Castain was eligible to play for the United States or Puerto Rico, as she was born in Chicago to a Puerto Rican mother (her father is from California).

In July 2011, Castain was called up by the United States U-20 team for a training camp. Almost six years later, she committed her future to Puerto Rico.

Castain made a non-official debut for Puerto Rico on 22 April 2017, when she started against American college Notre Dame Fighting Irish. Officially, she debuted on 5 May 2018 against Anguilla. She was the top goalscorer for the Boricuas at the 2018 CONCACAF Women's Championship qualification, scoring five times.

In 2016, Castain joined the coaching staff at the University of Montana.

=== International goals ===
Scores and results list Puerto Rico's goal tally first

No.	Date	Venue	Opponent	Score	Result	Competition
1	5 May 2018	Estadio Panamericano, Dominican Republic, Dominican Republic	Anguilla	3–0	10–0	2018 CONCACAF Women's Championship qualification
2	5 May 2018	Estadio Panamericano, Dominican Republic, Dominican Republic	Anguilla	7–0	10–0	2018 CONCACAF Women's Championship qualification
3	5 May 2018	Estadio Panamericano, Dominican Republic, Dominican Republic	Anguilla	8–0	10–0	2018 CONCACAF Women's Championship qualification
4	11 May 2018	Estadio Panamericano, Dominican Republic, Dominican Republic	Aruba	1–0	5–0	2018 CONCACAF Women's Championship qualification
5	11 May 2018	Estadio Panamericano, Dominican Republic, Dominican Republic	Aruba	5–0	5–0	2018 CONCACAF Women's Championship qualification

== Personal life ==
Castain has a twin sister called Morgan, who played college soccer for Fresno State University. She retired because of injuries suffered and her professional commitments.
