= Akeyla Furbert =

Bermudian footballer

Personal information
- Date of birth: 4 September 1994 (age 32)
- Place of birth: Shorewarwick, Bermuda
- Height: 5 ft 5 in (1.65 m)
- Position: Midfielder

Youth career
- 2012–2015: USC Aiken

International career
Years	Team	Apps	(Gls)
2011–	Bermuda		

Akeyla Furbert (born 4 September 1994) is a Bermudian footballer who played as a midfielder for USC Aiken and the Bermuda national team.

Furbert was part of the squad as hosts Bermuda won the 2013 Island Games. In May 2014 she scored in Bermuda's 3–1 win over Saint Kitts and Nevis, which secured her team's place in the final stages of the 2014 CFU Women's Caribbean Cup.

== Basketball ==
While a pupil at Bermuda High School for Girls, Furbert excelled at basketball. She trained with Women's National Basketball Association (WNBA) team Phoenix Mercury in May 2011. After switching to Montverde Academy in Florida, Furbert continued to play basketball alongside football.

== See also ==
- List of Bermuda women's international footballers
