= Dominique Bond-Flasza =

Jamaican footballer (born 1996)

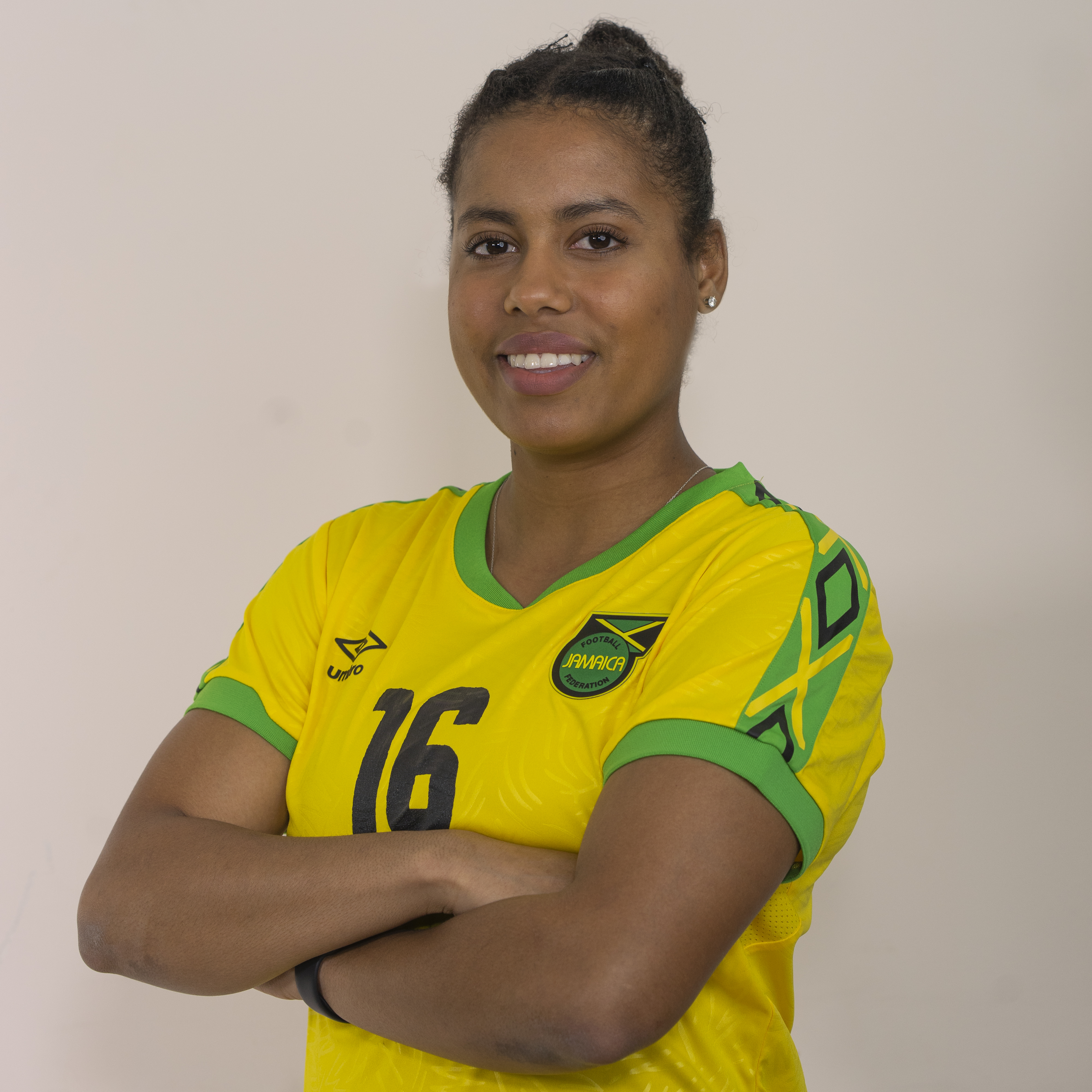
- Bond-Flasza in 2019

Personal information
- Full name: Dominique Evangeline Bond-Flasza
- Date of birth: 11 September 1996 (age 30)
- Place of birth: New York City, New York, U.S.
- Height: 1.65 m (5 ft 5 in)
- Position: Right back

Team information
- Current team: Fram Reykjavik
- Number: 5

College career
Years	Team	Apps	(Gls)
2014–2017	Washington Huskies	82	(2)

Senior career*
Years	Team	Apps	(Gls)
2017–2018	Seattle Sounders		
2018–2020	PSV	27	(1)
2020	Medyk Konin	10	(1)
2021	Tindastóll	18	(0)
2022	Åland United		
2023-2024	UMF Grindavík	17	(0)
2024	Nice	1	(0)
2024–2025	Fram Reykjavik	26	(1)

International career^{‡}
2018–2022	Jamaica	17	(2)
Medal record
Representing Jamaica
CONCACAF W Championship
Third place	2018 United States
- * Club domestic league appearances and goals as of 09:01, 3 June 2026 (UTC) ‡ National team caps and goals as of 04:15, 12 June 2019

Dominique Evangeline Bond-Flasza (born 11 September 1996) is a footballer who plays as a right-back. Born in the United States, she has represented the Jamaica national team.

== Early life ==
Bond-Flasza was born to a Polish father and a Jamaican mother in New York City. She grew up in Canada (where she spent 14 years), before moving to southern California as a teenager. Bond-Flasza played high school soccer at Aliso Niguel High School in Aliso Viejo, California, where she won a state title her sophomore year. She scored 10 goals. She also played club soccer for SoCal Blues.

Bond-Flasza then played college soccer for the University of Washington Huskies. She played at least 19 games in each of her four seasons in Seattle, and her 80 games played tied for third all-time in program history. She scored two goals. During college, Bond-Flasza also played for three years of club football with Seattle Sounders Women in the Women's Premier Soccer League.

== Club career ==
In 2018, Bond-Flasza played for PSV in Eindhoven, the Netherlands. She scored her only goal in the Eredivisie in a 3–1 away victory over PEC Zwolle on 2 November 2018. She started 21 of the team's 22 matches in the 2018–2019 season, but appeared in only six of PSV's 12 matches the following season.

In August 2020, Bond-Flasza signed with KKPK Medyk Konin in Poland.

In March 2021, Bond-Flasza signed with newly promoted Tindastóll of the Icelandic top-level Úrvalsdeild kvenna.

== International career ==
Bond-Flasza plays for Jamaica internationally. She scored the winning penalty against Panama to clinch third place in the 2018 CONCACAF Women’s Championship and send the Reggaegirlz to the 2019 FIFA Women's World Cup. She played in one World Cup match, a 3–0 loss to Brazil.

== Career statistics ==
=== International ===
Scores and results list Jamaica's goal tally first, score column indicates score after each Bond-Flasza goal.

List of international goals scored by Dominique Bond-Flasza
No.	Date	Venue	Opponent	Score	Result	Competition
1	9 May 2018	Stade Sylvio Cator, Port-au-Prince, Haiti	Guadeloupe	6–0	13–0	2018 CONCACAF Women's Championship qualification
2	9 May 2018	Stade Sylvio Cator, Port-au-Prince, Haiti	Guadeloupe	10–0	13–0	2018 CONCACAF Women's Championship qualification
