= Lilian Pérez =

Cuban footballer

Personal information
- Full name: Lilian Pérez Sandoval
- Date of birth: 27 April 1999 (age 27)
- Position: Forward

Team information
- Current team: Pococí
- Number: 18

Senior career*
Years	Team	Apps	(Gls)
2021–	Pococí	7	(0)

International career^{‡}
2018–	Cuba	7	(3)
- * Club domestic league appearances and goals as of 15 May 2021. ‡ National team caps and goals as of 11 October 2018

Lilian Pérez Sandoval (born 27 April 1999) is a Cuban footballer who plays as a forward for the Cuba women's national team.

== Club career ==
Pérez has played for Pococí in Costa Rica.

== International career ==
Pérez capped for Cuba at senior level during the 2018 CONCACAF Women's Championship (and its qualification).
