= Mikerline Saint-Félix =

Haitian footballer (born 1999)

Personal information
- Date of birth: 18 November 1999 (age 26)
- Place of birth: Delmas, Haiti
- Height: 1.64 m (5 ft 5 in)
- Position: Forward

Team information
- Current team: Montauban
- Number: 24

Senior career*
Years	Team	Apps	(Gls)
2019–	Montauban	7	(4)

International career^{‡}
2018	Haiti U20	5	(0)
2019–	Haiti	5+	(5)
- * Club domestic league appearances and goals as of 27 October 2019 ‡ National team caps and goals as of 3 February 2020

Mikerline Saint-Félix (born 18 November 1999) is a Haitian footballer who plays as a forward for French D2 Féminine club Montauban FC and the Haiti women's national team.

== International career ==
Saint-Félix represented Haiti at the 2018 FIFA U-20 Women's World Cup.

=== International goals ===
Scores and results list Haiti's goal tally first.

No.	Date	Venue	Opponent	Score	Result	Competition
1	3 October 2019	Juan Ramón Loubriel Stadium, Bayamón, Puerto Rico	Suriname	8–0	10–0	2020 CONCACAF Women's Olympic Qualifying Championship qualification
2	3 October 2019	Juan Ramón Loubriel Stadium, Bayamón, Puerto Rico	Suriname	9–0	10–0	2020 CONCACAF Women's Olympic Qualifying Championship qualification
3	7 October 2019	Juan Ramón Loubriel Stadium, Bayamón, Puerto Rico	Puerto Rico	1–0	2–1	2020 CONCACAF Women's Olympic Qualifying Championship qualification
4	3 February 2020	BBVA Stadium, Houston, United States	Panama	2–0	6–0	2020 CONCACAF Women's Olympic Qualifying Championship
5	3 February 2020	BBVA Stadium, Houston, United States	Panama	3–0	6–0	2020 CONCACAF Women's Olympic Qualifying Championship
