= Martha Silva =

Nicaraguan footballer

Personal information
- Full name: Martha Lissette Silva Zapata
- Date of birth: 11 October 1992 (age 34)
- Place of birth: Managua, Nicaragua
- Position: Defender

International career^{‡}
Years	Team	Apps	(Gls)
2009–2011	Nicaragua U20	4	(0)
2010–	Nicaragua	17	(3)
- ‡ National team caps and goals as of 8 April 2021

Martha Lissette Silva Zapata (born 11 October 1992) is a Nicaraguan footballer who plays as a defender for the Nicaragua women's national team.

== Early life ==
Silva was born in Managua.

== International goals ==
Scores and results list Nicaragua's goal tally first

No.	Date	Venue	Opponent	Score	Result	Competition	Ref.
1	31 August 2018	IMG Academy Field 6, Bradenton, Florida, United States	El Salvador	1–2	2–2	2018 CONCACAF Women's Championship qualification	
2	31 August 2018	IMG Academy Field 6, Bradenton, Florida, United States	El Salvador	2–2	2–2	2018 CONCACAF Women's Championship qualification	
3	8 April 2021	Estadio Óscar Quiteño, Santa Ana, El Salvador	El Salvador	2–0	2–0	Friendly	
