= Antigua and Barbuda women's national football team =

Women's national association football team representing Antigua and Barbuda

Antigua and Barbuda
- Nickname: Benna Girls
- Association: Antigua and Barbuda Football Association
- Confederation: CONCACAF
- Sub-confederation: Caribbean Football Union (CFU)
- Head coach: Karen Warner
- Top scorer: Gabrielle Desuza (11)
- Home stadium: Sir Vivian Richards Stadium
- FIFA code: ATG
First colours	Second colours

FIFA ranking
- Current: 182 (16 June 2026)
- Highest: 115 (May 2010)
- Lowest: 181 (December 2025)

First international
- Antigua and Barbuda 1–0 Anguilla (Saint John, Antigua and Barbuda; 28 August 2004)

Biggest win
- Saint Kitts and Nevis 0–5 Antigua and Barbuda (The Valley, Anguilla; 16 December 2024)

Biggest defeat
- Antigua and Barbuda 0–12 Jamaica (Saint John, Antigua and Barbuda; 5 October 2007)

The Antigua and Barbuda women's national football team, nicknamed The Benna Girls, is the national women's football team of Antigua and Barbuda and is overseen by the Antigua and Barbuda Football Association, a member of the CONCACAF and the Caribbean Football Union.

== History ==
=== First Internationals (2004) ===
On 28 August 2004, after 34 years the Antigua and Barbuda Football Association became affiliated with the FIFA, Antigua and Barbuda women's football team had its first official match with Anguilla in Saint John. The game finished in favour of Antigua and Barbuda, with a 1–0 victory. The next day, they faced again and this time, the winning team was Anguilla.

=== Women's Caribbean Cup (2006) ===
The 2006 CONCACAF Women's Gold Cup qualification round was the first official competition in which Antigua and Barbuda participated in, also one of the qualifying stages was the second edition of the CFU Women's Caribbean Cup, who took place in Trinidad and Tobago. In the way, they faced Barbados in the first stage; the aggregate score between them was 1–0, product of an away victory and a goalless draw. The Benna Girls automatically advanced to the next stage.

Group C
Team	Pts	Pld	W	D	L	GF	GA	GD
Jamaica	9	3	3	0	0	27	0	+27
Saint Lucia	6	3	2	0	1	5	8	−3
Saint Kitts and Nevis	3	3	1	0	2	5	16	−11
Antigua and Barbuda	0	3	0	0	3	3	16	−13

In the First Round, the team was drawn in a Group (C) with Jamaica, St. Lucia and St. Kitts and Nevis. However, the results were negative, as they lost the three games they played. Antigua and Barbuda played all of its matches in Kingston, Jamaica. The three goalscorers for Antigua and Barbuda were Whitney Jacobs, Odeal Simon and Shennell Henry, with one goal each. The Benna Girls failed to qualify for the final tournament.

=== Unfavorable results at international competitions (2007–2010) ===
==== 2008 Summer Olympics ====
During the 2008 Summer Olympics qualifiers, Antigua and Barbuda was sharing the group with Jamaica, Bermuda and Dominica. The only victory they had was in the first game, to Dominica by 3–0, and the first of two in 2007–2010. The Benna Girls achieved their worst defeat on the second match with Jamaica, a 12–0. The closing encounter with Bermuda had a 4–0 result, again from the rivals.

Team	Pld	W	D	L	GF	GA	GD	Pts
Jamaica	3	3	0	0	24	0	+24	9
Bermuda	3	2	0	1	12	4	+8	6
Antigua and Barbuda	3	1	0	2	3	16	−13	3
Dominica	3	0	0	3	0	19	−19	0

==== 2010 Gold Cup qualifiers ====
Antigua and Barbuda opened the qualifying round for the 2010 CONCACAF Women's Gold Cup, who took place in Mexico, down by 2–1 against St. Lucia. The second game marked the second win during 2007–2010. The game was with the US Virgin Islands and counted with the goals of Lewis, Simon and Thomas. Both games were in home venue at Antigua Recreation Ground, St. John's, the country's capital city. Thanks to their only victory, they advanced to the Second Round.

Team	Pld	W	D	L	GF	GA	GD	Pts
Saint Lucia	2	2	0	0	9	1	+8	6
Antigua and Barbuda	2	1	0	1	4	3	+1	3
U.S. Virgin Islands	2	0	0	2	1	10	−9	0

The team was drawn in Group G during the Second Round. Antigua and Barbuda was beaten by the three teams who played with them, with a margin of more than three goals. The Benna Girls scored first goal of two in this round in a 4–1 loss with Haiti. The encounters with both Puerto Rico and Cuba finished in heavy defeats, with 8–0 and 6–1 respectively. All the games were played in Marabella, Trinidad and Tobago.

Team	Pld	W	D	L	GF	GA	GD	Pts
Haiti	3	3	0	0	9	1	+8	9
Cuba	3	2	0	1	10	7	+3	6
Puerto Rico	3	1	0	2	11	6	+5	3
Antigua and Barbuda	3	0	0	3	2	18	−16	0

=== Women's Caribbean Cup (2014) ===
Antigua and Barbuda was registered on the qualification tournament of the 2014 CFU Women's Caribbean Cup, who also served as the qualifying tournament for both the 2014 CONCACAF Women's Championship and the 2015 FIFA Women's World Cup. Antigua & Barbuda and the other members of the group played the games on Antigua Recreation Ground in St. John's, the country's capital city. The Benna Girls won the three games, all of them with 1–0 versus U.S. Virgin Islands, St. Vincent and the Grenadines and Aruba. Antigua and Barbuda qualified for the final tournament in Trinidad and Tobago.

Pos	Team	Pld	W	D	L	GF	GA	GD	Pts	Qualification
1	Antigua and Barbuda (H)	3	3	0	0	3	0	+3	9	Final round
2	Saint Vincent and the Grenadines	3	1	1	1	2	1	+1	4	
3	U.S. Virgin Islands	3	1	1	1	1	1	0	4	
4	Aruba	3	0	0	3	0	4	−4	0	

Source: CFU
(H) Hosts

For the final tournament, the team was in Group B with the hosts Trinidad and Tobago, Martinique and St. Kitts and Nevis. It had a bad debut with Martinique in Hasely Crawford Stadium, Port of Spain, due to a 2–0 loss. The second game with the host country also finished on a defeat of a margin of three goals to zero. The team had their farewell with a 2–1 lost game against St. Kitts and Nevis. They finished the tournament with zero points and a −6 goal difference. The only goalscorer for the Benna Girls was Breanna Humphreys.

Pos	Team	Pld	W	D	L	GF	GA	GD	Pts	Qualification
1	Trinidad and Tobago (H)	3	3	0	0	20	0	+20	9	CONCACAF Women's Championship and Final
2	Martinique	3	2	0	1	3	7	−4	6	CONCACAF Women's Championship and Match for third place
3	Saint Kitts and Nevis	3	1	0	2	2	12	−10	3	
4	Antigua and Barbuda	3	0	0	3	1	7	−6	0	

Source: CFU
(H) Hosts

== Team image ==
=== Kits and crest ===
The current kit of the Antigua and Barbuda national football team is made by Joma Sport. The team has three different colored uniforms. The yellow uniform is the primary one, normally used for home matches. The black ones are the usually for away matches. The team also has red as an alternate.

==== Kit suppliers ====
Kit manufacturer	Period
(Germany) Adidas	2006–2011
(China) Peak	2012–2018
(Spain) Joma	2019–current

== Results and fixtures ==
The following is a list of match results in the last 12 months, as well as any future matches that have been scheduled.

Legend

Win Draw Lose Fixture

=== 2025 ===
27 November 2025 2026 CONCACAF W Championship Q	Antigua and Barbuda	0–4	Nicaragua	St. John’s
16:00 UTC−4		Report (FIFA); Report (CONCACAF)	Silva 10'; Flores 19'; Aguilar 31'; Lee 85'	Stadium: Sir Vivian Richards Stadium; Referee: Francia González (Mexico)

== Head-to-head record ==
As of 10 May 2021

Against	Played	Won	Drawn	Lost	GF	GA	GD
Anguilla	2	1	0	1	1	1	0
Aruba	1	1	0	0	1	0	+1
Barbados	1	1	0	0	1	0	+1
Bermuda	1	0	0	1	0	4	−4
Cuba	1	0	0	1	1	6	−5
Dominica	2	1	1	0	3	0	+3
Haiti	1	0	0	1	1	4	−3
Jamaica	2	0	0	2	0	22	−22
Martinique	1	0	0	1	0	2	−2
Puerto Rico	1	0	0	1	0	8	−8
Saint Lucia	2	0	0	2	2	4	−2
Saint Kitts and Nevis	2	0	0	2	3	5	−2
Saint Vincent and the Grenadines	3	3	0	0	6	1	+5
Trinidad and Tobago	1	0	0	1	0	3	−3
U.S. Virgin Islands	2	2	0	0	4	1	+3
Total	23	9	1	13	23	61	−38

== Coaching staff ==
=== Current coaching staff ===
As of September 2023

- Coaching and Management Staff
- Esther Anthony – Team Manager
- Astel Joseph – Head Coach
- Karen Warner – Assistant Coach
- Nikisha Samuel – Goalkeeper Coach
- Lakeisha Samuel – Equipment Manager
- Jessica Hall – Physiotherapist
- Mclean Lawrence – Trainer

=== Manager history ===
- (Antigua and Barbuda) Vincent Samuel (August 2018 – July 2019)
- (United States) Lisa Cole (August 2019 – November 2021)
- (United States) Prince Borde (January 2022 – April 2022)
- (Antigua and Barbuda) Karen Warner

== Players ==
Up-to-date caps, goals, and statistics are not publicly available; therefore, caps and goals listed may be incorrect.

=== Current squad ===
- The following players were named to the squad to play the 2024 CONCACAF W Gold Cup qualification games against Guyana and Suriname on 29 November and 3 December 2023, respectively.

No.	Pos.	Player	Date of birth (age)	Caps	Goals	Club
1	GK	Anik Jarvis (captain)				
20	GK	Jewel Harve				
6	DF	Zolique Samuel				
6	DF	Tassianne Benjamin				(United States Soccer Federation) BSC Bobcats
6	DF	Ozora Roberts				(United States Soccer Federation) UMFK Bengals
6	DF	K´Neice Browne				
17	DF	Karmiellie Hughes				
14	DF	Abisha Henry				
5	MF	Shakea Ogarro				
8	MF	Virginia Simon				(United States Soccer Federation) BSC Bobcats
9	MF	Ajahana Martin				
13	MF	Rrisha Simon				
9	MF	Azaliyah Peterson				
9	MF	Daniella De Souza				
15	FW	Zoya Simon				(United States Soccer Federation) BSC Bobcats
15	FW	Donesha Samuel				
10	FW	Kai Jacobs		3	1	Tigeress

=== Recent call-ups ===
Pos.	Player	Date of birth (age)	Caps	Goals	Club	Latest call-up

== Competitive record ==
=== FIFA Women's World Cup ===
FIFA Women's World Cup record
Year	Result	GP	W	D*	L	GF	GA	GD
(China) 1991	Did not exist							
(Sweden) 1995	Did not exist							
(United States) 1999	Did not exist							
(United States) 2003	Did not exist							
(China) 2007	Did not qualify							
(Germany) 2011	Did not qualify							
(Canada) 2015	Did not qualify							
(France) 2019	Did not qualify							
(Australia) (New Zealand) 2023	Did not qualify							
(Brazil) 2027	Did not qualify							
(Costa Rica) (Jamaica) (Mexico) (United States) 2031	To be determined							
(United Kingdom) 2035	To be determined							
Total	–	–	–	–	–	–	–	–

*Draws include knockout matches decided on penalty kicks.

=== Olympic Games ===
Summer Olympics record										Qualifying record						
Year	Round	Position	Pld	W	D*	L	GF	GA		Pld	W	D*	L	GF	GA	GD
(United States) 1996	Did not exist									Did not exist						
(Australia) 2000	Did not exist									Did not exist						
(Greece) 2004	Did not exist									Did not exist						
(China) 2008	Did not qualify									3	1	0	2	3	16	−13
(United Kingdom) 2012	Did not enter									Did not enter						
(Brazil) 2016	Did not enter									Did not enter						
(Japan) 2020	Did not qualify									4	1	0	3	2	18	−16
(France) 2024	Did not qualify									2022 CONCACAF W Championship						
(United States) 2028	Did not qualify									2026 CONCACAF W Championship						
Total	–	–	–	–	–	–	–	–	7	2	0	5	5	34	−29	

*Draws include knockout matches decided on penalty kicks.

=== CONCACAF Women's Championship ===
CONCACAF W Championship record									Qualification record						
Year	Result	GP	W	D*	L	GF	GA	GD	GP	W	D*	L	GF	GA	GD
(Haiti) 1991	Did not exist								Did not exist						
(United States) 1993	Did not exist								Did not exist						
(Canada) 1994	Did not exist								Did not exist						
(Canada) 1998	Did not exist								Did not exist						
(United States) 2000	Did not exist								Did not exist						
(Canada) (United States) 2002	Did not exist								Did not exist						
(United States) 2006	Did not qualify								5	1	1	3	4	16	−12
(Mexico) 2010	Did not qualify								5	1	0	4	6	21	−15
(United States) 2014	Did not qualify								2014 Caribbean Cup						
(United States) 2018	Did not qualify								7	3	0	4	5	26	−21
(Mexico) 2022	Did not qualify								4	1	0	3	2	17	−15
(United States) 2026	Did not qualify								4	0	1	3	1	13	−12
Total	–	–	–	–	–	–	–	–	21	5	2	11	16	76	−60

*Draws include knockout matches decided on penalty kicks.

=== CONCACAF W Gold Cup ===
CONCACAF W Gold Cup record								Qualification record							
Year	Result	GP	W	D*	L	GF	GA	Division	Group	GP	W	D*	L	GF	GA
(United States) 2024	Did not qualify							B	A	6	1	1	4	3	8
(N/A) 2029	To be determined							To be determined							
Total	–	–	–	–	–	–	–	–	–	6	1	1	4	3	8

*Draws include knockout matches decided on penalty kicks.

=== CFU Women's Caribbean Cup ===
CFU Women's Caribbean Cup record
Year	Result	Pld	W	D*	L	GF	GA
(Haiti) 2000	Did not exist						
(Trinidad and Tobago) 2014	Final Round	6	3	0	3	4	7
(Trinidad and Tobago) 2018	N/A	2	2	0	0	5	1
Total	Final Round	8	5	0	3	9	8

*Draws include knockout matches decided on penalty kicks.

== See also ==
- Sport in Antigua and Barbuda
  - Football in Antigua and Barbuda
    - Women's football in Antigua and Barbuda
- Antigua and Barbuda men's national football team
