= 2020 CONCACAF Women's Olympic Qualifying Championship squads =

Association football tournament

The 2020 CONCACAF Women's Olympic Qualifying Championship was an international football tournament that was hold in the United States from 28 January to 9 February 2020. The eight national teams involved in the tournament were required to register a squad of 20 players, including three goalkeepers. Only players in these squads were eligible to take part in the tournament.

A provisional list of players was published CONCACAF on 10 January 2020, with a maximum of 50 players per national team. From the preliminary squad, the final list of 20 players per national team was submitted to CONCACAF by 21 January, one week prior to the opening match of the tournament. Teams are permitted to make late replacements in the event of serious injury, at any time up to 24 hours before their first match, where the replacement players are required to be from the preliminary squad.

The age listed for each player is on 28 January 2020, the first day of the tournament. The numbers of caps and goals listed for each player do not include any matches played after the start of the tournament. The club listed is the club for which the player last played a competitive match prior to the tournament. A flag is included for coaches who are of a different nationality than their own national team.

== Group A ==
=== Costa Rica ===
Head coach: Amelia Valverde

The final squad was announced on 17 January 2020.

No.	Pos.	Player	Date of birth (age)	Caps	Goals	Club
1	GK	Noelia Bermúdez	20 September 1994 (aged 25)	22	0	(Costa Rican Football Federation) Alajuelense CODEA
2	DF	Gabriela Guillén	1 March 1992 (aged 27)	48	1	(Football Association of Iceland) Þór/KA
3	DF	María Coto	2 March 1998 (aged 21)	3	0	(Costa Rican Football Federation) AD Moravia
4	DF	Mariana Benavides	26 December 1994 (aged 25)	29	4	(Costa Rican Football Federation) AD Coronado
5	DF	Fabiola Sánchez	9 April 1993 (aged 26)	20	3	(Costa Rican Football Federation) Alajuelense CODEA
6	DF	Carol Sánchez	16 April 1986 (aged 33)	53	5	(Costa Rican Football Federation) AD Moravia
7	FW	Melissa Herrera	10 October 1996 (aged 23)	42	18	(French Football Federation) Stade de Reims
8	DF	Daniela Cruz	8 March 1991 (aged 28)	45	7	(Royal Spanish Football Federation) Espanyol
9	MF	Gloriana Villalobos	20 August 1999 (aged 20)	50	6	(Costa Rican Football Federation) Herediano
10	MF	Shirley Cruz (captain)	28 August 1985 (aged 34)	86	28	(Costa Rican Football Federation) Alajuelense CODEA
11	MF	Raquel Rodríguez	28 October 1993 (aged 26)	70	40	(United States Soccer Federation) Portland Thorns
12	DF	Lixy Rodríguez	4 November 1990 (aged 29)	71	2	(Costa Rican Football Federation) Alajuelense CODEA
13	GK	Dinnia Díaz	14 January 1988 (aged 32)	24	0	(Costa Rican Football Federation) Saprissa
14	FW	Priscila Chinchilla	11 July 2001 (aged 18)	14	8	(Costa Rican Football Federation) Alajuelense CODEA
15	DF	Stephannie Blanco	13 December 2000 (aged 19)	8	1	(Costa Rican Football Federation) Alajuelense CODEA
16	MF	Katherine Alvarado	11 April 1991 (aged 28)	72	20	(Royal Spanish Football Federation) Espanyol
17	FW	María Paula Salas	12 July 2002 (aged 17)	18	5	(Costa Rican Football Federation) Alajuelense CODEA
18	GK	Priscilla Tapia	2 May 1991 (aged 28)	5	0	(Costa Rican Football Federation) AD Moravia
19	FW	Jazmín Elizondo	16 December 1994 (aged 25)	0	0	(Costa Rican Football Federation) Herediano
20	MF	Raquel Chacón	17 November 1994 (aged 25)	0	0	(Costa Rican Football Federation) Alajuelense CODEA

=== Haiti ===
Head coach: (France) Laurent Mortel

The final squad was announced on 18 January 2020. Tabita Joseph and Angeline Gustave withdrew injured and were replaced respectively by Maudeline Moryl and Gaëlle Dumas on 27 January 2020.

No.	Pos.	Player	Date of birth (age)	Caps	Goals	Club
1	GK	Jonie Gabriel	30 November 1997 (aged 22)			(Canadian Soccer Association) CS Fabrose
2	DF	Soveline Beaubrun	7 December 1997 (aged 22)			(Haitian Football Federation) AS Tigresses
3	DF	Chelsea Surpris	20 December 1996 (aged 23)			Unattached
4	DF	Ruthny Mathurin	14 January 2001 (aged 19)			(Haitian Football Federation) AS Tigresses
5	DF	Maudeline Moryl	24 January 2003 (aged 17)			(Haitian Football Federation) ASF Croix-des-Bouquets
6	MF	Melchie Dumonay	17 August 2003 (aged 16)			(Haitian Football Federation) AS Tigresses
7	FW	Batcheba Louis	15 June 1997 (aged 22)			(French Football Federation) FF Issy
8	MF	Danielle Étienne	16 January 2001 (aged 19)			(United States Soccer Federation) Fordham Rams
9	MF	Sherly Jeudy	13 October 1998 (aged 21)			(Haitian Football Federation) Anacaona SC
10	FW	Nérilia Mondésir (captain)	17 January 1999 (aged 21)			(French Football Federation) Montpellier
11	FW	Roseline Éloissaint	20 February 1999 (aged 20)			(Haitian Football Federation) AS Tigresses
12	GK	Kerly Théus	7 January 1999 (aged 21)			(Haitian Football Federation) Aigle Brillant AC
13	DF	Émeline Charles	27 October 1999 (aged 20)			(Canadian Soccer Association) Blainville
14	MF	Phiseline Michel	27 July 1997 (aged 22)			(Canadian Soccer Association) CS Fabrose
15	DF	Johane Laforte	24 February 1996 (aged 23)			(Haitian Football Federation) Anacaona SC
16	FW	Abaïna Louis	29 November 2001 (aged 18)			(Haitian Football Federation) AS Tigresses
17	FW	Mikerline Saint-Félix	18 November 1999 (aged 20)			(French Football Federation) Montauban FC
18	GK	Madelina Fleuriot	28 October 2003 (aged 16)			(Haitian Football Federation) Exafoot
19	MF	Gaëlle Dumas	21 February 2003 (aged 16)			(Haitian Football Federation) ASF Croix-des-Bouquets
20	DF	Kethna Louis	5 August 1996 (aged 23)			(French Football Federation) Le Havre

=== Panama ===
Head coach: Kenneth Winslow Zseremeta

The final squad was announced on 18 January 2020.

No.	Pos.	Player	Date of birth (age)	Caps	Goals	Club
1	GK	Yenith Bailey	29 March 2001 (aged 18)			(Paraguayan Football Association) Libertad/Limpeño
2	DF	Rebeca Espinosa	5 July 1992 (aged 27)			Unattached
3	DF	Yomira Pinzón (captain)	23 August 1996 (aged 23)			(Royal Spanish Football Federation) CD Pozoalbense
4	DF	Hilary Jaén	29 August 2002 (aged 17)			(Panamanian Football Federation) Tauro
5	MF	Yerenis De León	23 February 1995 (aged 24)			(Panamanian Football Federation) Universitario
6	DF	María Murillo	15 December 1996 (aged 23)			(Panamanian Football Federation) Atlético Nacional
7	MF	María Guevara	4 October 2000 (aged 19)			(Panamanian Football Federation) Universitario
8	MF	Katherine Castillo	23 March 1996 (aged 23)			(Panamanian Football Federation) Universitario
9	FW	Amarelis De Mera	28 March 1985 (aged 34)			(Panamanian Football Federation) Tauro
10	MF	Aldrith Quintero	1 January 2002 (aged 18)			(Panamanian Football Federation) Tauro
11	MF	Marta Cox	20 July 1997 (aged 22)			(Panamanian Football Federation) Universitario
12	GK	Sasha Fábrega	23 October 1990 (aged 29)			(Panamanian Football Federation) Tauro
13	FW	Susy Cassinova	5 February 1996 (aged 23)			(Panamanian Football Federation) Plaza Amador
14	DF	Maryorie Pérez	25 November 1997 (aged 22)			(Panamanian Football Federation) Tauro
15	DF	Ana Rodríguez	23 April 2002 (aged 17)			(Panamanian Football Federation) CAI
16	FW	Gloria Sáenz	7 February 2002 (aged 17)			(Panamanian Football Federation) Atlético Nacional
17	FW	Gabriela Villagrand	12 January 1999 (aged 21)			(United States Soccer Federation) Angelo State Rams
18	FW	Keisilyn Gutiérrez	19 March 1997 (aged 22)			(Panamanian Football Federation) Universitario
19	DF	Arlen Hernández	1 December 1995 (aged 24)			(Panamanian Football Federation) Tauro
20	GK	Nadia Ducreux	26 January 1992 (aged 28)			(National Football Federation of Guatemala) CSD Concepción

=== United States ===
Head coach: (North Macedonia) Vlatko Andonovski

The final squad was announced on 17 January 2020.

No.	Pos.	Player	Date of birth (age)	Caps	Goals	Club
1	GK	Alyssa Naeher	20 April 1988 (aged 31)	57	0	(United States Soccer Federation) Chicago Red Stars
2	DF	Emily Sonnett	25 November 1993 (aged 26)	40	0	(United States Soccer Federation) Orlando Pride
3	MF	Sam Mewis	9 October 1992 (aged 27)	60	14	(United States Soccer Federation) North Carolina Courage
4	DF	Becky Sauerbrunn	6 June 1985 (aged 34)	171	0	(United States Soccer Federation) Utah Royals
5	DF	Kelley O'Hara	4 August 1988 (aged 31)	125	2	(United States Soccer Federation) Utah Royals
6	MF	Andi Sullivan	20 December 1995 (aged 24)	15	0	(United States Soccer Federation) Washington Spirit
7	DF	Abby Dahlkemper	13 May 1993 (aged 26)	53	0	(United States Soccer Federation) North Carolina Courage
8	MF	Julie Ertz	6 April 1992 (aged 27)	95	19	(United States Soccer Federation) Chicago Red Stars
9	MF	Lindsey Horan	26 May 1994 (aged 25)	78	12	(United States Soccer Federation) Portland Thorns
10	FW	Carli Lloyd (co-captain)	16 July 1982 (aged 37)	288	121	(United States Soccer Federation) Sky Blue FC
11	DF	Ali Krieger	28 July 1984 (aged 35)	104	1	(United States Soccer Federation) Orlando Pride
12	GK	Adrianna Franch	12 November 1990 (aged 29)	3	0	(United States Soccer Federation) Portland Thorns
13	FW	Lynn Williams	21 May 1993 (aged 26)	21	6	(Football Australia) Western Sydney Wanderers
14	FW	Jessica McDonald	28 February 1988 (aged 31)	14	2	(United States Soccer Federation) North Carolina Courage
15	FW	Megan Rapinoe (co-captain)	5 July 1985 (aged 34)	160	50	(United States Soccer Federation) Reign FC
16	MF	Rose Lavelle	14 May 1995 (aged 24)	38	10	(United States Soccer Federation) Washington Spirit
17	FW	Tobin Heath	29 May 1988 (aged 31)	162	32	(United States Soccer Federation) Portland Thorns
18	GK	Ashlyn Harris	19 October 1985 (aged 34)	24	0	(United States Soccer Federation) Orlando Pride
19	DF	Crystal Dunn	3 July 1992 (aged 27)	96	24	(United States Soccer Federation) North Carolina Courage
20	FW	Christen Press	29 December 1988 (aged 31)	130	51	(United States Soccer Federation) Utah Royals

== Group B ==
=== Canada ===
Head coach: (Denmark) Kenneth Heiner-Møller

The final squad was announced on 21 January 2020.

No.	Pos.	Player	Date of birth (age)	Caps	Goals	Club
1	GK	Stephanie Labbé	10 October 1986 (aged 33)	67	0	(United States Soccer Federation) North Carolina Courage
2	DF	Allysha Chapman	25 January 1989 (aged 31)	69	1	(United States Soccer Federation) Houston Dash
3	DF	Kadeisha Buchanan	5 November 1995 (aged 24)	95	4	(French Football Federation) Lyon
4	DF	Shelina Zadorsky	24 October 1992 (aged 27)	59	1	(United States Soccer Federation) Orlando Pride
5	DF	Quinn (Note: Then known as Rebecca Quinn)	11 August 1995 (aged 24)	54	5	(United States Soccer Federation) Reign FC
6	FW	Deanne Rose	3 March 1999 (aged 20)	43	8	(United States Soccer Federation) Florida Gators
7	MF	Julia Grosso	29 August 2000 (aged 19)	16	0	(United States Soccer Federation) Texas Longhorns
8	DF	Jayde Riviere	22 January 2001 (aged 19)	9	0	(United States Soccer Federation) Michigan Wolverines
9	FW	Jordyn Huitema	8 May 2001 (aged 18)	25	6	(French Football Federation) Paris Saint-Germain
10	DF	Ashley Lawrence	11 June 1995 (aged 24)	83	5	(French Football Federation) Paris Saint-Germain
11	MF	Desiree Scott	31 July 1987 (aged 32)	148	0	(United States Soccer Federation) Utah Royals FC
12	FW	Christine Sinclair (captain)	12 June 1983 (aged 36)	289	183	(United States Soccer Federation) Portland Thorns FC
13	MF	Sophie Schmidt	28 June 1988 (aged 31)	191	19	(United States Soccer Federation) Houston Dash
14	MF	Gabrielle Carle	12 October 1998 (aged 21)	14	1	(United States Soccer Federation) Florida State Seminoles
15	FW	Nichelle Prince	19 February 1995 (aged 24)	55	11	(United States Soccer Federation) Houston Dash
16	FW	Janine Beckie	20 August 1994 (aged 25)	63	27	(The Football Association) Manchester City
17	MF	Jessie Fleming	11 March 1998 (aged 21)	70	9	(United States Soccer Federation) UCLA Bruins
18	GK	Kailen Sheridan	16 July 1995 (aged 24)	7	0	(United States Soccer Federation) Sky Blue FC
19	FW	Adriana Leon	2 October 1992 (aged 27)	63	15	(The Football Association) West Ham United
20	GK	Sabrina D'Angelo	11 May 1993 (aged 26)	7	0	(Swedish Football Association) Vittsjö GIK

=== Jamaica ===
Head coach: (Canada) Hubert Busby Jr.

The final squad was announced on 16 January 2020. However, midfielder Chyanne Dennis was later replaced by Sydney Schneider due to the requirement of three goalkeepers in the squad.

No.	Pos.	Player	Date of birth (age)	Caps	Goals	Club
1	GK	Sydney Schneider	31 August 1999 (aged 20)	15	0	(United States Soccer Federation) UNC Wilmington Seahawks
2	DF	Chantelle Swaby	6 August 1998 (aged 21)	16	0	(United States Soccer Federation) Rutgers Scarlet Knights
3	GK	Alyssa Whitehead	12 September 1989 (aged 30)	0	0	Unattached
4	DF	Madiya Harriott	16 February 1999 (aged 20)	3	0	(United States Soccer Federation) Vanderbilt Commodores
5	DF	Konya Plummer (captain)	2 August 1997 (aged 22)	19	1	(United States Soccer Federation) UCF Knights
6	MF	Havana Solaun	23 February 1993 (aged 26)	6	1	(Norwegian Football Federation) Klepp
7	MF	Chinyelu Asher	20 May 1993 (aged 26)	24	6	(Norwegian Football Federation) Stabæk
8	FW	Gabrielle Farrell	4 December 1997 (aged 22)	0	0	(United States Soccer Federation) Liberty Lady Flames
9	FW	Kayla McCoy	3 September 1996 (aged 23)	3	0	(United States Soccer Federation) Houston Dash
10	MF	Olufolasade Adamolekun	21 February 2001 (aged 18)	7	0	(United States Soccer Federation) USC Trojans
11	FW	Khadija Shaw	31 January 1997 (aged 22)	27	40	(French Football Federation) Bordeaux
12	DF	Sashana Campbell	2 March 1991 (aged 28)	32	3	(Israel Football Association) Maccabi Kishronot Hadera
13	GK	Chris-Ann Chambers	24 October 1995 (aged 24)	4	0	(Jamaica Football Federation) UWI
14	DF	Deneisha Blackwood	7 March 1997 (aged 22)	23	7	(Football Association of the Czech Republic) Slavia Praha
15	FW	Tiffany Cameron	16 October 1991 (aged 28)	8	3	(Norwegian Football Federation) Stabæk
16	DF	Dominique Bond-Flasza	11 September 1996 (aged 23)	21	4	(Royal Dutch Football Association) PSV Eindhoven
17	DF	Allyson Swaby	3 October 1996 (aged 23)	17	0	(Italian Football Federation) Roma
18	FW	Trudi Carter	18 November 1994 (aged 25)	17	9	Unattached
19	FW	Tiernny Wiltshire	8 May 1998 (aged 21)	3	0	(United States Soccer Federation) Rutgers Scarlet Knights
20	FW	Cheyna Matthews	10 November 1993 (aged 26)	8	8	(United States Soccer Federation) Washington Spirit

=== Mexico ===
Head coach: Christopher Cuéllar

The final squad was announced on 15 January 2020.

No.	Pos.	Player	Date of birth (age)	Caps	Goals	Club
1	GK	Cecilia Santiago	19 October 1994 (aged 25)	62	0	(Royal Dutch Football Association) PSV Eindhoven
2	DF	Kenti Robles	15 February 1991 (aged 28)	68	3	(Royal Spanish Football Federation) Atlético Madrid
3	DF	Janelly Farías	12 February 1990 (aged 29)	7	0	(Mexican Football Federation) Guadalajara
4	DF	Jocelyn Orejel	14 November 1996 (aged 23)	9	0	(Mexican Football Federation) Tijuana
5	DF	Jimena López	30 January 1999 (aged 20)	14	0	(United States Soccer Federation) Texas A&M Aggies
6	MF	Rebeca Bernal	31 August 1997 (aged 22)	20	0	(Mexican Football Federation) Monterrey
7	FW	Daniela Espinosa	13 July 1999 (aged 20)	9	0	(Mexican Football Federation) América
8	FW	Kiana Palacios	1 October 1996 (aged 23)	14	2	(Royal Spanish Football Federation) Real Sociedad
9	FW	Renae Cuéllar	24 June 1990 (aged 29)	33	7	(Mexican Football Federation) Tijuana
10	MF	Stephany Mayor (captain)	23 September 1991 (aged 28)	75	13	(Mexican Football Federation) UANL
11	MF	Lizbeth Ovalle	19 October 1999 (aged 20)	15	4	(Mexican Football Federation) UANL
12	GK	Emily Alvarado	9 June 1998 (aged 21)	3	0	(United States Soccer Federation) TCU Horned Frogs
13	DF	Bianca Sierra	25 June 1992 (aged 27)	52	0	(Mexican Football Federation) UANL
14	FW	Adriana Iturbide	27 March 1993 (aged 26)	4	1	(Mexican Football Federation) Atlas
15	DF	Mariana Cadena	13 February 1995 (aged 24)	2	0	(Mexican Football Federation) Monterrey
16	MF	Karla Nieto	9 January 1995 (aged 25)	23	0	(Mexican Football Federation) Pachuca
17	MF	Diana Evangelista	5 November 1994 (aged 25)	2	0	(Mexican Football Federation) Monterrey
18	MF	Liliana Mercado	22 October 1988 (aged 31)	18	0	(Mexican Football Federation) UANL
19	MF	María Sánchez	20 February 1996 (aged 23)	21	3	(Mexican Football Federation) Guadalajara
20	GK	Itzel González	14 August 1994 (aged 25)	1	0	(Mexican Football Federation) Tijuana

=== Saint Kitts and Nevis ===
Head coach: (United States) Deborah Jené Baclawski

The final squad was announced on 21 January 2020.

No.	Pos.	Player	Date of birth (age)	Caps	Goals	Club
1	GK	Kyra Dickinson (co-captain)	3 January 1993 (aged 27)			(Canadian Soccer Association) Master's FA
2	GK	Craivecia Sutton	1 September 2001 (aged 18)			(St. Kitts and Nevis Football Association) Flow 4G Cayon
3	DF	Kaleah Smith	28 June 2001 (aged 18)			(Canadian Soccer Association) York Lions
4	MF	Allison Williams	15 March 1998 (aged 21)			Unattached
5	MF	Cloey Uddenberg	13 November 2002 (aged 17)			(Canadian Soccer Association) Aurora FC
6	DF	Tyra Wilkinson	17 August 1998 (aged 21)			(St. Kitts and Nevis Football Association) Newtown United
7	DF	Carley Uddenberg	6 July 2000 (aged 19)			(Canadian Soccer Association) Seneca Sting
8	DF	Calvonis Prentice	10 April 1997 (aged 22)			Unattached
9	FW	Ellie Stokes	21 November 2003 (aged 16)			(United States Soccer Federation) Baltimore Armour
10	FW	Dakota Mills	3 June 1997 (aged 22)			Unattached
11	FW	Phoenetia Browne (co-captain)	22 April 1994 (aged 25)			(Football Association of Finland) Åland United
12	DF	Tarvia Phillip	12 November 1995 (aged 24)			(St. Kitts and Nevis Football Association) Conaree
13	FW	Brittney Lawrence (co-captain)	18 August 1995 (aged 24)			(Swedish Football Association) Skoftebyns IF
14	FW	Iyanla Bailey-Williams	10 August 2002 (aged 17)			(Puerto Rican Football Federation) Bayamón
15	MF	Lauren Williams	27 September 1994 (aged 25)			Unattached
16	FW	Kaylee Bennett	23 March 2004 (aged 15)			(United States Soccer Federation) Bethesda Soccer Club
17	MF	Christi-Anne Mills	27 July 2002 (aged 17)			(St. Kitts and Nevis Football Association) Newtown United
18	GK	Quinn Josiah	4 May 2000 (aged 19)			(United States Soccer Federation) Prairie View A&M Lady Panthers
19	DF	Arielle Fernandez	31 October 1995 (aged 24)			(United States Soccer Federation) Spartans Wolves FC
20	MF	Kayla Uddenberg	24 October 2005 (aged 14)			(Canadian Soccer Association) Aurora FC
