= Football at the 2019 Pan American Games – Women's team squads =

The women's football tournament at the 2019 Pan American Games was held in Lima from 28 July to 9 August 2019. The eight teams involved in the tournament were required to register a squad of 18 players, including two goalkeepers.

For the football competition in these Games, the women competed in an eight-team tournament. The teams were grouped into two pools of four teams each for a round-robin preliminary round. The top two teams in each group advanced to a single elimination bracket. The women's competition was an open-age competition with no age restrictions.

== Group A ==
=== Mexico ===
Head Coach: Christopher Cuellar

The following players were called up for the 2019 Pan American Games. Andrea Sánchez was replaced by Kimberly Rodríguez.

No.	Pos.	Player	Date of birth (age)	Caps	Goals	Club
1	GK	Cecilia Santiago	19 October 1994 (aged 24)	59	0	(Royal Dutch Football Association) PSV Eindhoven
12	GK	Emily Alvarado	9 June 1998 (aged 21)	1	0	(United States Soccer Federation) TCU Horned Frogs
2	DF	Kenti Robles	15 February 1991 (aged 28)	65	3	(Royal Spanish Football Federation) Atlético Madrid
3	DF	Bianca Sierra	25 June 1992 (aged 27)	47	0	(Football Association of Iceland) Þór/KA
4	DF	Rebeca Bernal	31 August 1997 (aged 21)	14	0	(Mexican Football Federation) Monterrey
5	DF	Jimena López	30 January 1999 (aged 20)	8	0	(United States Soccer Federation) Texas A&M Aggies
13	DF	Arianna Romero	29 July 1992 (aged 26)	42	1	(United States Soccer Federation) Houston Dash
15	DF	Kimberly Rodríguez	26 March 1999 (aged 20)	3	0	(United States Soccer Federation) Oklahoma State Cowgirls
6	MF	Liliana Mercado	22 October 1988 (aged 30)	13	0	(Mexican Football Federation) UANL
8	MF	Joana Robles	26 July 1994 (aged 25)	8	0	(Mexican Football Federation) Atlas
10	MF	Stephany Mayor	23 September 1991 (aged 27)	71	11	(Football Association of Iceland) Þór/KA
11	MF	Lizbeth Ovalle	19 October 1999 (aged 19)	10	2	(Mexican Football Federation) UANL
16	MF	Nancy Antonio	2 April 1996 (aged 23)	12	1	(Mexican Football Federation) UANL
17	MF	María Sánchez	20 February 1996 (aged 23)	15	3	(United States Soccer Federation) Chicago Red Stars
7	FW	Daniela Espinosa	13 July 1999 (aged 20)	6	0	(Mexican Football Federation) América
9	FW	Charlyn Corral	11 September 1991 (aged 27)	50	28	(Royal Spanish Football Federation) Atlético Madrid
14	FW	Katty Martínez	14 March 1998 (aged 21)	6	0	(Mexican Football Federation) UANL
18	FW	Kiana Palacios	1 October 1996 (aged 22)	11	1	(Royal Spanish Football Federation) Real Sociedad

=== Jamaica ===
Head coach: Hue Menzies

The following 18 players were named to the roster for the 2019 Pan American Games. Konya Plummer was injured and replaced by Trudi Carter. Carter was then replaced by Lauren Silver due to injury.

No.	Pos.	Player	Date of birth (age)	Caps	Goals	Club
1	GK	Sydney Schneider	31 August 1999 (aged 19)	11	0	(United States Soccer Federation) UNC Wilmington Seahawks
13	GK	Yazmeen Jamieson	17 March 1998 (aged 21)	3	0	(New Zealand Football) Papakura City FC
14	DF	Den-Den Blackwood	7 March 1997 (aged 22)	15	3	Unattached
17	DF	Toriana Patterson	2 February 1994 (aged 25)	10	0	(Italian Football Federation) Pink Sport Time
15	DF	Jadyn Matthews	16 November 1999 (aged 19)	7	0	(United States Soccer Federation) Cornell Big Red
3	DF	Chanel Hudson-Marks	14 September 1997 (aged 21)	4	0	Unattached
8	DF	Chyanne Dennis	9 April 1999 (aged 20)	3	0	(United States Soccer Federation) South Florida Bulls
2	DF	Jayda Hylton-Pelaia	30 May 1998 (aged 21)			(United States Soccer Federation) East Carolina Pirates
5	DF	Rachelle Smith	18 September 1996 (aged 22)			Unattached
16	DF	Madiya Harriott	16 February 1999 (aged 20)	0	0	(United States Soccer Federation) Vanderbilt Commodores
18	MF	Lauren Silver	22 March 1993 (aged 26)			(Norwegian Football Federation) SK Trondheims-Ørn
12	MF	Sashana Campbell	2 March 1991 (aged 28)	24	3	(Israel Football Association) Maccabi Kishronot Hadera
4	MF	Chantelle Swaby	6 August 1998 (aged 20)	11	0	(United States Soccer Federation) Rutgers Scarlet Knights
7	MF	Tarania Clarke	3 October 1999 (aged 19)			(Jamaica Football Federation) Waterhouse
10	FW	Jody Brown	16 April 2002 (aged 17)	14	8	(United States Soccer Federation) Montverde Academy
9	FW	Olufolasade Adamolekun	21 February 2001 (aged 18)	3	0	(United States Soccer Federation) USC Trojans
6	FW	Mireya Grey	7 September 1998 (aged 20)	3	0	(United States Soccer Federation) Washington Huskies
11	FW	Shayla Smart	30 May 2000 (aged 19)			(United States Soccer Federation) Wake Forest Demon Deacons

=== Paraguay ===
Head coach: Daniel Almada

The following players were called up for the 2019 Pan American Games.

No.	Pos.	Player	Date of birth (age)	Caps	Club
12	GK	Isabel Ortiz	28 December 2001 (aged 17)		(Paraguay) Sol de América
1	GK	Cristina Recalde	29 September 1994 (aged 24)		(Paraguay) Sol de América
14	DF	Lorena Alonso	1 April 1998 (aged 21)		(Paraguay) Sol de América
4	DF	Daysy Bareiro	19 January 2001 (aged 18)		(Paraguay) Sol de América
5	DF	Laurie Cristaldo	4 May 1997 (aged 22)		(Paraguay) Libertad/Limpeño
13	DF	Limpia Fretes	24 June 2000 (aged 19)		(Paraguay) Cerro Porteño
3	DF	Tania Riso	26 January 1994 (aged 25)		(Paraguay) Deportivo Capiatá
2	DF	María Martínez	24 May 1999 (aged 20)		(Paraguay) Deportivo Capiatá
6	MF	Damia Cortaza	29 September 1993 (aged 25)		(Paraguay) Libertad/Limpeño
8	MF	Fanny Godoy	21 January 1998 (aged 21)		(Paraguay) Sol de América
15	MF	Ivana Mendoza	19 May 1995 (aged 24)		(Paraguay) Sol de América
17	MF	Rosa Miño	13 July 1999 (aged 20)		(Brazil) Foz Cataratas
16	MF	Dulce Quintana	6 February 1989 (aged 30)		(Spain) Espanyol
7	FW	Lice Chamorro	22 December 1998 (aged 20)		(Paraguay) Racing Santander
10	FW	Jessica Martínez	14 June 1999 (aged 20)		(Spain) Tacón
18	FW	Mirta Pico	8 February 1994 (aged 25)		(Paraguay) Sol de América
9	FW	Fabiola Sandoval	27 May 1999 (aged 20)		(Paraguay) Libertad/Limpeño
11	FW	Gloria Villamayor	10 April 1992 (aged 27)		(Spain) Real Oviedo

=== Colombia ===
Head coach: Nelson Abadia

The following players were called up for the 2019 Pan American Games. Sandra Sepúlveda and Yisela Cuesta were ruled out due to injury and were replaced by Stefany Castaño and Michell Lugo.

No.	Pos.	Player	Date of birth (age)	Club
1	GK	Catalina Pérez	8 November 1994 (aged 24)	(Colombian Football Federation) Cortuluá
12	GK	Stefany Castaño	11 January 1994 (aged 25)	(Colombian Football Federation) Santa Fe
13	GK	Michell Lugo	16 April 2001 (aged 18)	(Colombian Football Federation) Millonarios F.C.
17	DF	Carolina Arias	2 September 1990 (aged 28)	(Colombian Football Federation) Atlético Huila
14	DF	Daniela Arias	31 August 1994 (aged 24)	(Colombian Football Federation) Atlético Bucaramanga
15	DF	Daniela Caracas	25 April 1997 (aged 22)	(Colombian Football Federation) Atlético Huila
5	DF	Isabella Echeverri	16 June 1994 (aged 25)	(Royal Spanish Football Federation) Sevilla
3	DF	Natalia Gaitán	3 April 1991 (aged 28)	(Royal Spanish Football Federation) Valencia
2	DF	Manuela Vanegas	9 November 2000 (aged 18)	(Colombian Football Federation) Formas Íntimas
8	MF	Jéssica Caro	20 July 1988 (aged 31)	(Colombian Football Federation) Cortuluá
6	MF	Daniela Montoya	22 August 1990 (aged 28)	(Colombian Football Federation) Junior
4	MF	Diana Ospina	3 March 1989 (aged 30)	(Colombian Football Federation) Formas Íntimas
7	MF	Marcela Restrepo	10 November 1995 (aged 23)	(Colombian Football Federation) Atlético Huila
10	MF	Leicy Santos	16 May 1996 (aged 23)	(Royal Spanish Football Federation) Atlético Madrid
16	FW	Lady Andrade	10 January 1992 (aged 27)	(Italian Football Federation) Milan
18	FW	Mayra Ramírez	23 March 1999 (aged 20)	(Colombian Football Federation) Formas Íntimas
11	FW	Catalina Usme	25 December 1989 (aged 29)	(Colombian Football Federation) América de Cali
9	FW	Oriánica Velásquez	1 August 1989 (aged 29)	(Colombian Football Federation) Formas Íntimas

== Group B ==
=== Panama ===
Head coach: Victor Daniel Suarez

The following players were called up for the 2019 Pan American Games.

No.	Pos.	Player	Date of birth (age)	Caps	Goals	Club
1	GK	Yenith Bailey	29 March 2001 (aged 18)			(Panamanian Football Federation) Tauro
12	GK	Sasha Fábrega	23 October 1990 (aged 28)			(Panamanian Football Federation) Aliadas FC
4	DF	Katherine Castillo	23 March 1996 (aged 23)			(Panamanian Football Federation) Universitario
13	DF	Rebeca Espinosa	5 July 1992 (aged 27)			(Panamanian Football Federation) Universitario
2	DF	Hilary Jaén	29 August 2002 (aged 16)			(Panamanian Football Federation) Tauro
3	DF	María Murillo	15 December 1996 (aged 22)			(Panamanian Football Federation) Atlético Nacional
5	DF	Yomira Pinzón	23 August 1996 (aged 22)			(Royal Spanish Football Federation) Pozoalbense
8	MF	Laurie Batista	29 May 1996 (aged 23)			(Panamanian Football Federation) Universitario
10	MF	Marta Cox	20 July 1997 (aged 22)			(Colombian Football Federation) Cortuluá
15	MF	María Guevara	4 October 2000 (aged 18)			(Panamanian Football Federation) Universitario
11	MF	Natalia Mills	22 March 1993 (aged 26)			(Royal Spanish Football Federation) Fundación Albacete
6	MF	Aldrith Quintero	1 January 2002 (aged 17)			(Panamanian Football Federation) Tauro
7	MF	Gloria Sáenz	2 July 2002 (aged 17)			(Panamanian Football Federation) Atlético Nacional
14	MF	Deysire Salazar	4 May 2004 (aged 15)			(Panamanian Football Federation) Tauro
16	FW	Lineth Cedeño	5 December 2000 (aged 18)			(Royal Spanish Football Federation) Joventut Almassora
18	FW	Ángela Evans	21 July 1993 (aged 26)			(Football Association of Ireland) Kilkenny United
17	FW	Erika Hernández	17 March 1999 (aged 20)			(Panamanian Football Federation) Universitario
9	FW	Karla Riley	18 September 1997 (aged 21)			(Royal Spanish Football Federation) Pozoalbense

=== Costa Rica ===
The following players were called up for the 2019 Pan American Games.

Head coach: Amelia Valverde

No.	Pos.	Player	Date of birth (age)	Caps	Goals	Club
1	GK	Noelia Bermúdez	20 September 1994 (aged 24)	12	0	(Costa Rican Football Federation) Saprissa
18	GK	Priscilla Tapia	2 May 1991 (aged 28)	2	0	(Costa Rican Football Federation) AD Moravia
12	DF	Lixy Rodríguez	4 November 1990 (aged 28)	63	2	(Royal Spanish Football Federation) Tacón
6	DF	Carol Sánchez	16 April 1986 (aged 33)	45	2	(Costa Rican Football Federation) AD Moravia
8	DF	Daniela Cruz	8 March 1991 (aged 28)	38	6	(Royal Spanish Football Federation) Espanyol
5	DF	Fabiola Sánchez	9 April 1993 (aged 26)	16	3	(Costa Rican Football Federation) Codea
2	DF	Gabriela Guillén	1 March 1992 (aged 27)	11	0	(Costa Rican Football Federation) Saprissa
3	DF	María Paula Elizondo	30 November 1998 (aged 20)	4	0	(Costa Rican Football Federation) Saprissa
15	DF	Stephannie Blanco	13 December 2000 (aged 18)	0	0	(Costa Rican Football Federation) Arenal Coronado
7	MF	Valeria del Campo	15 February 2000 (aged 19)	0	0	(Costa Rican Football Federation) Saprissa
10	MF	Shirley Cruz (c)	28 August 1985 (aged 33)	73	24	(Chinese Football Association) Jiangsu Suning
16	MF	Katherine Alvarado	11 April 1991 (aged 28)	66	20	(Royal Spanish Football Federation) Espanyol
11	MF	Raquel Rodríguez	28 October 1993 (aged 25)	49	31	(United States Soccer Federation) Sky Blue FC
9	MF	Gloriana Villalobos	20 August 1999 (aged 19)	24	2	(United States Soccer Federation) Florida State Seminoles
4	MF	Mariana Benavides	26 December 1994 (aged 24)	22	4	(Costa Rican Football Federation) Arenal Coronado
14	MF	Priscila Chinchilla	11 July 2001 (aged 18)	6	2	(Costa Rican Football Federation) Codea
17	FW	María Paula Salas	12 July 2002 (aged 17)	9	2	(Costa Rican Football Federation) Saprissa
13	FW	Sofía Varela	28 March 1998 (aged 21)	0	0	(Costa Rican Football Federation) Saprissa

=== Argentina ===
Head coach: Carlos Borrello

The following players were called up for the 2019 Pan American Games.

No.	Pos.	Player	Date of birth (age)	Club
1	GK	Vanina Correa	14 August 1983 (aged 35)	(Argentine Football Association) Rosario Central
12	GK	Solana Pereyra	5 April 1999 (aged 20)	(Argentine Football Association) UAI Urquiza
2	DF	Agustina Barroso	20 May 1993 (aged 26)	(Royal Spanish Football Federation) Madrid CFF
6	DF	Aldana Cometti	3 March 1996 (aged 23)	(Royal Spanish Football Federation) Sevilla
13	DF	Virginia Gómez	26 February 1991 (aged 28)	(Argentine Football Association) Rosario Central
4	DF	Adriana Sachs	25 December 1993 (aged 25)	(Argentine Football Association) UAI Urquiza
3	DF	Eliana Stábile	26 November 1993 (aged 25)	(Argentine Football Association) Boca Juniors
18	DF	Gabriela Chávez	9 April 1989 (aged 30)	(Argentine Football Association) River Plate
16	MF	Natalie Juncos	28 December 1990 (aged 28)	(Argentine Football Association) UAI Urquiza
17	MF	Mariela Coronel	20 June 1981 (aged 38)	(Royal Spanish Football Federation) Granada
10	MF	Dalila Ippólito	24 March 2002 (aged 17)	(Argentine Football Association) River Plate
14	MF	Miriam Mayorga	20 November 1989 (aged 29)	(Argentine Football Association) UAI Urquiza
5	MF	Vanesa Santana	3 September 1990 (aged 28)	(Royal Spanish Football Federation) Logroño
8	FW	Micaela Cabrera	18 July 1997 (aged 22)	(Argentine Football Association) Boca Juniors
11	FW	Mariana Larroquette	24 October 1992 (aged 26)	(Argentine Football Association) UAI Urquiza
9	FW	Milagros Menéndez	23 March 1997 (aged 22)	(Argentine Football Association) UAI Urquiza
7	FW	Yael Oviedo	22 May 1992 (aged 27)	(Royal Spanish Football Federation) Rayo Vallecano
15	FW	Yamila Rodríguez	24 January 1998 (aged 21)	(Argentine Football Association) Boca Juniors

=== Peru ===
Head coach: Dorival Bueno

The 18-women squad was announced on 25 June 2019.

No.	Pos.	Player	Date of birth (age)	Caps	Club
1	GK	Karla López	16 September 1998 (aged 20)		(Peru) Universitario
12	GK	Maryory Sánchez	7 April 1997 (aged 22)		(Peru) Sporting Cristal
4	DF	Katarina Comesaña	19 June 1992 (aged 27)		(United States) MVLA Wolves
6	DF	Amparo Chuquival	21 February 1992 (aged 27)		(Peru) JC Sport Girls
13	DF	Esthefany Espino	16 August 1999 (aged 19)		(Peru) Universitario
14	DF	Kiara Ortega	13 June 1992 (aged 27)		(Peru) Sporting Cristal
3	DF	Even Pizango	15 April 1993 (aged 26)		(Peru) Universitario
2	DF	Stephannie Vásquez	24 June 1994 (aged 25)		(Peru) Universitario
15	MF	Sandra Arévalo	14 April 1998 (aged 21)		(Peru) Sporting Cristal
17	MF	Emily Flores	10 September 1990 (aged 28)		(Peru) U. César Vallejo
8	MF	Scarleth Flores	12 August 1996 (aged 22)		(Peru) Universitario
11	MF	María José López	22 May 1985 (aged 34)		(Peru) Sporting Cristal
16	MF	Nahomi Martínez	5 April 1997 (aged 22)		(Peru) Sporting Cristal
5	MF	Cindy Novoa	10 August 1995 (aged 23)		(Peru) Universitario
7	FW	Gladys Dorador	4 January 1989 (aged 30)		(Peru) Sporting Cristal
18	FW	Pierina Núñez	13 March 2000 (aged 19)		(Spain) Logroño
10	FW	Steffani Otiniano	7 August 1992 (aged 26)		(Peru) Universitario
9	FW	Miryam Tristán (captain)	19 April 1985 (aged 34)		(Peru) Deportivo Municipal
