= Uddenberg =

Uddenberg is a surname. Notable people with the surname include:

- Carley Uddenberg (born 2000), Kittian footballer
- Cloey Uddenberg (born 2002), Kittian footballer
- Kayla Uddenberg (born 2005), Kittian footballer
