= Erika Hernandez =

Erika Hernandez may refer to:

- Erika Hernández (born 1999), Panamanian footballer
- Erika Hernandez (Star Trek), a fictional character on the science fiction television series Star Trek: Enterprise
