= Dayton Wetherby =

US-born Panamanian footballer (born 1994)

Personal information
- Full name: Dayton Brenna Wetherby McArthur
- Date of birth: 5 September 1994 (age 32)
- Place of birth: United States
- Height: 1.70 m (5 ft 7 in)
- Position: Goalkeeper

Youth career
- Wiregrass Ranch High School

College career
Years	Team	Apps	(Gls)
2013–2016	Navy Midshipmen	66	(0)

International career
2012	Panama U20	4	(0)
2013	Panama	4	(0)

Dayton Brenna Wetherby McArthur (born 5 September 1994) is a US-born Panamanian footballer who plays as a goalkeeper. She has been a member of the Panama women's national team.

== Early life ==
Wetherby was born to an American father from California, Jeffrey Wetherby, and a Panamanian mother, Dawn McArthur. She was raised in Wesley Chapel, Florida.

== Career ==
Wetherby started playing football at aged 9 as a goalkeeper. She studied the Spain national football team goalkeeper, Iker Casillas for inspiration. She attended university at the United States Naval Academy and played for the Navy Midshipmen women's soccer team. During her debut 2013 season, she only conceded ten goals. In 2014, she was confirmed as Navy Midshipmen's starting goalkeeper and had the third bestsave ratio in the Patriot League and was named in the Third Team All-Patriot League. In 2015, Wetherby had an 80% save ration and made the Third Team All-Patriot League for the second time. In her final year in 2016, she was appointed as Navy captain. In 2017, she graduated and was no longer able to play for Navy Midshipmen.

== International career ==
Wetherby capped for Panama at senior level during the 2013 Central American Games. In 2012, she attended trials for the Panama women's national under-20 football team. She went to the trials despite not being able to speak Spanish. Competing against seven other goalkeepers for two spots, she earned her place on the team. In 2013, she was called up to the senior Panama women's national football team. As a part of the team, Panama made it to the semi-finals before being defeated by the Costa Rica women's national football team.

== See also ==
- List of Panama women's international footballers
