= Gabriela Villagrand =

Panamanian footballer (born 1999)

Personal information
- Full name: Gabriela Elizabeth Villagrand Leonards
- Date of birth: 1 December 1999 (age 26)
- Place of birth: Houston, Texas, U.S.
- Height: 1.75 m (5 ft 9 in)
- Position: Forward

Youth career
- Challenge Soccer Club
- HCYA Hurricanes

College career
Years	Team	Apps	(Gls)
2018–2021	Angelo State Rams	51	(14)

Senior career*
Years	Team	Apps	(Gls)
2019	Houston Aces	2	(0)
2022	Deportivo Saprissa		

International career^{‡}
2020–	Panama	5	(2)
- * Club domestic league appearances and goals as of 21 November 2021 ‡ National team caps and goals as of 01:15, 29 January 2020 (UTC)

Gabriela Elizabeth Villagrand Leonards (born 1 December 1999) is a footballer who plays as a midfielder. Born and raised in the United States to a Panamanian father and an American mother, she caps for the Panama women's national team. She is nicknamed Gabby.

== Career ==
Villagrand was homeschooled, and played for Challenge Soccer Club and HCYA Hurricanes in her youth, helping the latter to win the state championship in 2015 and 2016. In college, she joined the Angelo State Rams in 2018. She has also played for the Houston Aces of United Women's Soccer in 2019.

In 2020, she was called up to the Panama women's national team for the 2020 CONCACAF Women's Olympic Qualifying Championship. She made her international debut on 28 January 2020 against Costa Rica, coming on as a 55th minute substitute for Amarelis De Mera in the match, which finished as a 1–6 loss.

Villagrand signed with Costa Rican club Deportivo Saprissa in September 2022.

== Personal life ==
Villagrand is from Spring, Texas, and is of Panamanian descent. She is majoring in kinesiology at Angelo State University.

== See also ==
- List of Panama women's international footballers
