= Mayra Jordán =

Panamanian footballer (born 1994)

Personal information
- Full name: Mayra Alejandra Jordán
- Date of birth: 2 July 1994 (age 32)
- Position: Midfielder

Senior career*
Years	Team	Apps	(Gls)
- Veraguas

International career^{‡}
2009–2010	Panama U-17	4	(0)
2012	Panama U-20	5	(1)
2013	Panama	1	(0)
- * Club domestic league appearances and goals ‡ National team caps and goals as of 2013

Mayra Alejandra “China” Jordán (born 2 July 1994) is a Panamanian footballer who plays as a midfielder. She has been a member of the Panama women's national team.

== International career ==
Jordán capped for Panama at senior level during the 2013 Central American Games.

== See also ==
- List of Panama women's international footballers
