= Christina Chang (footballer) =

Jamaican footballer (born 1985)

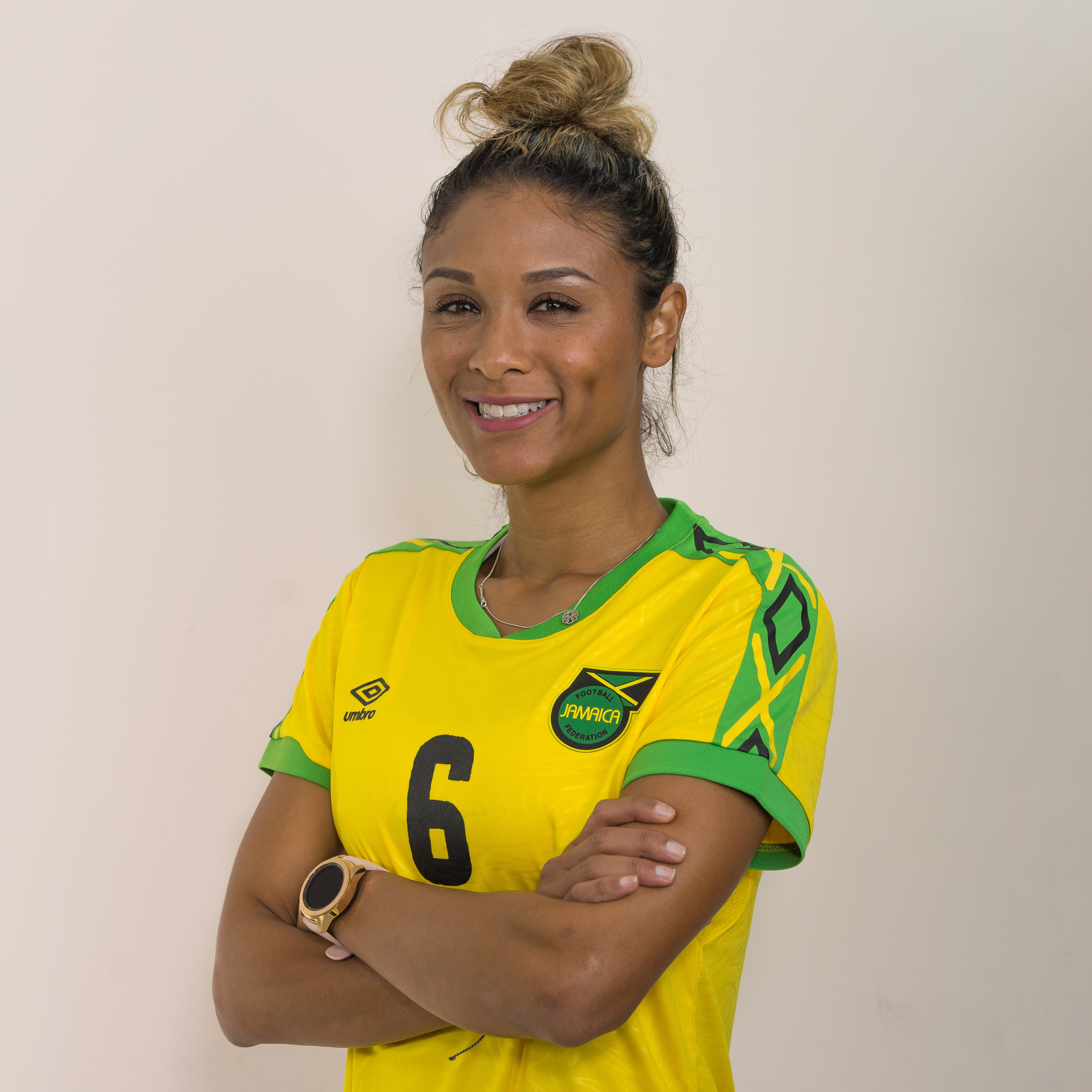

Personal information
- Full name: Christina Chang de Oliveira
- Birth name: Christina Diane Chang
- Date of birth: 13 June 1985 (age 41)
- Place of birth: Miami, Florida, U.S.
- Height: 1.67 m (5 ft 6 in)
- Positions: Defender; forward

College career
Years	Team	Apps	(Gls)
2003–2006	Florida Atlantic Owls	81	(17)

Senior career*
Years	Team	Apps	(Gls)
- Florida Sol
- California Storm
- North Bay Wave
- Palm Beach United
2018	FC Surge	1	(0)

International career
2008–	Jamaica	7+	(2+)
Medal record
Representing Jamaica
CONCACAF W Championship
Third place	2018 United States
- * Club domestic league appearances and goals

Christina Chang de Oliveira (formerly Dzegede, born Christina Diane Chang; 13 June 1985), known as Christina Chang, is an American-born Jamaican footballer who plays as a defender for the Jamaica women's national team.

== College career ==
Chang attended Florida Atlantic University.

== Club career ==
Chang played for several Women's Premier Soccer League teams, with FC Surge being the most recent.

== International career ==
Chang represented Jamaica at the 2008 Summer Olympics qualifiers and more recently at the 2018 CONCACAF Women's Championship.

=== International goals ===
Scores and results list Jamaica's goal tally first

No.	Date	Venue	Opponent	Score	Result	Competition
1	25 August 2018	National Stadium, Kingston, Jamaica	Antigua and Barbuda	1–0	9–0	2018 CONCACAF Women's Championship qualification
2	11 October 2018	H-E-B Park, Edinburg, United States	Cuba	6–0	9–0	2018 CONCACAF Women's Championship

== Personal life ==
Chang is of both Afro-Jamaican and Chinese Jamaican descent. Her parents hail from Harbour View, Jamaica. She was married to fellow FAU alumn Samuel Dzegede. She has since been remarried but to Ícaro de Oliveira. Her husband is of Brazilian heritage.
