= List of Panama women's international footballers =

This is a list of Panama women's international footballers who have played for the Panama women's national football team.

== Players ==
Key
**Bold**	Named to the national team in the past year

Name	Caps	Goals	National team years	Club(s)
Onelys Alvarado	–	–	–	–
Anuvis Angulo	–	–	–	–
Arianys Argüelles	–	–	–	–
**Yenith Bailey**	–	–	2017–	(Costa Rica) Dimas Escazú
**Laurie Batista**	–	–	2017–	(Panama) Tauro
**Susy Cassinova**	–	–	–	(Panama) Plaza Amador
**Katherine Castillo**	–	–	2018–	(Panama) Tauro
Nedelka Catuy	–	–	–	–
**Lineth Cedeño**	–	–	2017–	(Italy) Hellas Verona
Kendra Chavarría	–	–	–	–
**Farissa Córdoba**	–	–	–	(Panama) Plaza Amador
**Marta Cox**	–	–	2014–	(Mexico) Pachuca
Mayra de la Rosa	–	–	–	–
**Yerenis De León**	–	–	2013–	(Panama) Tauro
**Amarelis De Mera**	–	–	–	(Israel) Hapoel Marmorek
Astrid Díaz	–	–	–	–
Kathiuska Domínguez	–	–	–	–
Emely Dow	–	–	–	–
**Rebeca Espinosa**	–	–	2018–	(Panama) Plaza Amador
Ángela Evans	–	–	–	–
Phanilka Evans	–	–	–	–
**Sasha Fábrega**	–	–	2020–	(Panama) Veraguas
Irene Frazer	–	–	–	–
Ana Guardia	–	–	–	–
**María Guevara**	–	–	2017–	(Panama) Atlético Nacional
Keisilyn Gutiérrez	–	–	–	–
Kaela Harmon	–	–	–	–
**Erika Hernández**	–	–	2017–	(Panama) Plaza Amador
**Hilary Jaén**	–	–	2017–	(Panama) Tauro
Candace Johnson	–	–	–	–
Mayra Jordán	–	–	–	–
**Natalia Mills**	–	–	–	(Costa Rica) Alajuelense
María Montenegro	–	–	–	–
Josselyn Montilla	–	–	–	–
**María Murillo**	–	–	–	(Costa Rica) Desamparados
Yadira Pacheco	–	–	–	–
Maryorie Pérez	–	–	–	–
Yoraidil Pérez	–	–	–	–
**Yomira Pinzón**	–	–	2017–	(Costa Rica) Saprissa
**Aldrith Quintero**	–	–	–	(Spain) Real Unión Tenerife
**Kenia Rangel**	–	–	2013–	(Costa Rica) Alajuelense
**Carina Reyes**	2	1	2021–	Unattached
**Karla Riley**	–	–	2017–	(Spain) Santa Teresa
Ruth Romero	–	–	–	–
Ana Rodríguez	–	–	–	–
Gloria Sáenz	–	–	–	–
Génesis Samuels	–	–	–	–
Cindy Sotillo	–	–	–	–
**Gabriela Villagrand**	–	–	2020–	(United States) Angelo State Rams
Dayton Wetherby	–	–	–	–

== See also ==
- Panama women's national football team
