= Josselyn Montilla =

Panamanian footballer (born 1985)

Personal information
- Place of birth: 21 March 1985 (age 41)
- Position: Forward

International career^{‡}
Years	Team	Apps	(Gls)
2013–2014	Panama	5+	(0+)
- ‡ National team caps and goals as of 22 May 2014

Josselyn Montilla (born 21 March 1985) is a Panamanian footballer who plays as a forward. She has been a member of the Panama women's national team.

== International career ==
Montilla capped for Panama at senior level during the 2014 CONCACAF Women's Championship qualification.

== See also ==
- List of Panama women's international footballers
