= Ana Rodríguez (footballer) =

Panamanian footballer (born 2002)

Personal information
- Full name: Ana Rodríguez
- Date of birth: 23 April 2002 (age 24)
- Place of birth: Panama
- Position: Defender

Team information
- Current team: CAI

Senior career*
| Years | Team | Apps | (Gls) |
- CAI

International career^{‡}
| | Panama | 1+ | |
- * Club domestic league appearances and goals as of 03:22, 1 February 2020 (UTC) ‡ National team caps and goals as of 03:22, 1 February 2020 (UTC)

Ana Rodríguez (born 23 April 2002) is a Panamanian footballer who plays as a defender for CAI and the Panama women's national team.

== Career ==
Rodríguez has appeared for the Panama women's national team, including in the 2020 CONCACAF Women's Olympic Qualifying Championship on 31 January 2020 against the United States, coming on as a substitute in the 63rd minute for María Guevara.

== See also ==
- List of Panama women's international footballers
