= Susy Cassinova =

Panamanian footballer (born 1996)

Personal information
- Full name: Susy Lineth Cassinova Herrera
- Date of birth: 5 February 1996 (age 30)
- Place of birth: Panama City, Panama
- Position: Forward

Team information
- Current team: SUVA Sports

Senior career*
Years	Team	Apps	(Gls)
- Plaza Amador
- SUVA Sports

International career^{‡}
	Panama	1+	
- * Club domestic league appearances and goals as of 00:25, 4 February 2020 (UTC) ‡ National team caps and goals as of 00:25, 4 February 2020 (UTC)

Susy Lineth Cassinova Herrera (born 5 February 1996) is a Panamanian footballer who plays as a forward for Costa Rican club SUVA Sports and the Panama women's national team.

== International career ==
Cassinova has appeared for the Panama women's national team, including in the 2020 CONCACAF Women's Olympic Qualifying Championship on 3 February 2020. She came on as a substitute in the 50th minute for Amarelis De Mera in the match against Haiti.

== See also ==
- List of Panama women's international footballers
