= Ana Guardia =

Panamanian footballer (born 1990)

Personal information
- Date of birth: 12 November 1990 (age 35)
- Position: Defender

Senior career*
Years	Team	Apps	(Gls)
- Atlético Nacional

International career^{‡}
2013	Panama	4	(0)
- * Club domestic league appearances and goals ‡ National team caps and goals as of 1? March 2013.

Ana Guardia (born 12 November 1990) is a Panamanian footballer who plays as a defender. She has been a member of the Panama women's national team.

== Club career ==
Guardia has played for SD Atlético Nacional in Panama.

== International career ==
Guardia capped for Panama at senior level during the 2013 Central American Games.

== See also ==
- List of Panama women's international footballers
