= Ángela Evans =

Panamanian footballer (born 1993)

Personal information
- Full name: Ángela Indira Evans
- Date of birth: 21 July 1993 (age 33)
- Position: Forward

Team information
- Current team: Kilkenny United

Senior career*
| Years | Team | Apps | (Gls) |
| 2019– | Kilkenny United | | |

International career
| 2009–2010 | Panama U17 | 4 | (2) |
| 2011–2012 | Panama U20 | 6 | (4) |
| 2013– | Panama | 4 | (2) |
Medal record
Representing Panama
Women's Flag football
World Games
| Bronze medal – third place | 2022 Birmingham | Team competition |
IFAF World Championship
| Gold medal – first place | 2016 United States | Team competition |
| Silver medal – second place | 2018 Panama | Team competition |
- * Club domestic league appearances and goals

Ángela Indira Evans (born 21 July 1993) is a Panamanian footballer who plays as a forward for Irish Women's National League club Kilkenny United WFC and the Panama women's national team.

Considered one of the best athletes in Panama, she is the only athlete who has represented Panama on three different national teams. Evans is a native of San Miguelito District and her father, Angelo Evans, was a goalkeeper for the Panama national football team. She has also represented the Panama women's national volleyball team She was also the best blocker in Central America and led the national flag football team to a gold medal at the 2016 IFAF Flag Football World Championship, where she earned MVP honors, followed by a silver in 2018. Evans later won a bronze medal with the team at the 2022 World Games.

== See also ==
- List of Panama women's international footballers
