= Lauren Williams (footballer) =

Kittitian footballer (born 1994)

Personal information
- Full name: Lauren L. Williams
- Date of birth: 27 September 1994 (age 32)
- Place of birth: New Orleans, Louisiana, U.S.
- Position: Midfielder

International career^{‡}
Years	Team	Apps	(Gls)
2018–	Saint Kitts and Nevis	3	(0)
- ‡ National team caps and goals as of 8 October 2019

Lauren L. Williams (born 27 September 1994) is an American-born Saint Kitts and Nevis footballer who plays as a midfielder for the Saint Kitts and Nevis women's national team.

== International career ==
Williams played for Saint Kitts and Nevis at senior level in the 2018 CONCACAF Women's Championship qualification and the 2020 CONCACAF Women's Olympic Qualifying Championship qualification.

== Personal life ==
Williams' younger sister Allison is also a member of the Saint Kitts and Nevis women's national football team. Lauren is currently engaged to her fiancé, Walter Zachery Nall.
