= Kayla Uddenberg =

St. Kitts and Nevis footballer (born 2005)

Personal information
- Full name: Kayla Francis Uddenberg
- Date of birth: 24 October 2005 (age 21)
- Place of birth: Toronto, Ontario, Canada
- Position: Midfielder

Youth career
- Aurora FC

College career
| Years | Team | Apps | (Gls) |
| 2023– | Seneca Sting | 8 | (2) |

Senior career*
| Years | Team | Apps | (Gls) |
| 2022 | Vaughan Azzurri | 1 | (0) |
| 2023–2024 | Simcoe County Rovers | 9 | (0) |
| 2024 | → Simcoe County Rovers B | 12 | (1) |
| 2025 | Woodbridge Strikers B | 10 | (0) |

International career^{‡}
| 2018 | Saint Kitts and Nevis U15 | | |
| 2019 | Saint Kitts and Nevis U20 | 1 | (0) |
| 2019– | Saint Kitts and Nevis | 10 | (0) |
- * Club domestic league appearances and goals as of July 29, 2025 ‡ National team caps and goals as of 12 April 2022

Kayla Uddenberg (born 24 October 2005) is a footballer who plays as a midfielder. Born in Canada, she represents Saint Kitts and Nevis at international level. She is the youngest player to ever represent Saint Kitts and Nevis internationally at the age of 13 years and 341 days.

== Early life ==
Born in Canada, Uddenberg played youth soccer with Aurora FC and for the Our Lady Queen of the World Catholic Academy (formerly Jean Vanier CSS) high school soccer team.

== College career ==
In 2023, she began attending Seneca College, where she played for the women's soccer team. At the end of her first season, she was named an OCAA East Division Second Team All-Star.

== Club career ==
In 2022, she played for Vaughan Azzurri in League1 Ontario, making her debut on May 29 against Tecumseh SC.

In 2023, she played with the Simcoe County Rovers.

== International career ==
Born in Canada, Uddenberg and her sisters are eligible to represent Saint Kitts and Nevis internationally, where their paternal grandparents were born.

Uddenberg began her international career with the Saint Kitts and Nevis U15 team in 2018.

On 30 September 2019, she made her debut for the Saint Kitts and Nevis senior team at the 2020 CONCACAF Women's Olympic Qualifying Championship qualification tournament against the Dominican Republic at the age of 13 years and 341 days, becoming the youngest player to ever represent St. Kitts and Nevis and the 11th youngest women's international debut. She played significant minutes at the qualification tournament, helping the country qualify for the main Olympics qualification tournament, where she was the youngest player in the entire tournament.

== Personal life ==
Uddenberg's sisters, Cloey and Carley, are also members of the Saint Kitts and Nevis women's national football team.
