= Carley Uddenberg =

Canadian footballer (born 2000)

Personal information
- Full name: Carley Taimi Uddenberg
- Date of birth: 6 July 2000 (age 26)
- Place of birth: Richmond Hill, Ontario, Canada
- Height: 1.70 m (5 ft 7 in)
- Position: Defender

Team information
- Current team: Simcoe County Rovers

Youth career
- Richmond Hill SC

College career
| Years | Team | Apps | (Gls) |
| 2018–2023 | Seneca Sting | 47 | (15) |

Senior career*
| Years | Team | Apps | (Gls) |
| 2023– | Simcoe County Rovers | 6 | (0) |
| 2024– | → Simcoe County Rovers B | 12 | (0) |

International career^{‡}
- Saint Kitts and Nevis U20
| | Saint Kitts and Nevis | 1+ | |
- * Club domestic league appearances and goals as of 29 July 2024 ‡ National team caps and goals as of 22:53, 1 February 2020 (UTC)

Carley Uddenberg (born 6 July 2000) is a footballer who plays as a defender for the Simcoe County Rovers in League1 Ontario. Born in Canada, she represents Saint Kitts and Nevis at international level.

== Early life ==
Uddenberg is a native of Richmond Hill, Ontario in Canada. She played youth soccer with Richmond Hill SC, and for the Jean Vanier CSS high school soccer team.

== College career ==
For college, she began attending Seneca College, playing for the women's soccer team in 2018. She serves as co-captain for the team. She scored her first goals on September 16, 2018, scoring twice in a 9-0 victory over Fleming College. In 2023, she was named to the OCAA Championship All-Star Team.

== Club career ==
In 2023, she began playing with the Simcoe County Rovers in League1 Ontario.

== International career ==
Uddenberg was a member of the Saint Kitts and Nevis under-20 national team in 2018. She has also appeared for the Saint Kitts and Nevis senior national team, including in the 2020 CONCACAF Women's Olympic Qualifying Championship on 1 February 2020 against Mexico. She came on as a substitute in the 82nd minute for Brittney Lawrence, with the match finishing as a 6–0 loss.

== Personal life ==
Uddenberg is a native of Richmond Hill, Ontario, with her paternal grandparents hailing from Saint Kitts and Nevis. She is the older sister of Cloey Uddenberg and Kayla Uddenberg, who are also members of the Saint Kitts and Nevis women's national football team. She is majoring in early childhood education at Seneca College.

She is also a youth soccer coach with Aurora FC.
