= Raquel Chacón =

Costa Rican footballer (born 1994)

Personal information
- Full name: Raquel Valeria Chacón González
- Date of birth: 17 November 1994 (age 31)
- Place of birth: Costa Rica
- Position: Midfielder

Team information
- Current team: Alajuelense CODEA

Senior career*
Years	Team	Apps	(Gls)
- Alajuelense CODEA

International career^{‡}
2020–	Costa Rica	1	(0)
- * Club domestic league appearances and goals as of 02:12, 29 January 2020 (UTC) ‡ National team caps and goals as of 02:12, 29 January 2020 (UTC)

Raquel Valeria Chacón González (born 17 November 1994) is a Costa Rican footballer who plays as a midfielder for Alajuelense CODEA and the Costa Rica women's national team.

== Career ==
Chacón joined the Costa Rica women's national team squad for the first time for the 2020 CONCACAF Women's Olympic Qualifying Championship. She previously had rejected call-ups due to obligations to work at her grandfather's supermarket. Chacón made her international debut on 28 January 2020, coming on as a substitute in the 78th minute for Raquel Rodríguez in the 6–1 win against Panama.
