= María José López (Peruvian footballer) =

Peruvian footballer (born 1985)

Personal information
- Full name: María José López Bellatín
- Date of birth: 22 May 1985 (age 41)
- Place of birth: Lima, Peru
- Height: 1.61 m (5 ft 3 in)
- Position: Attacking midfielder

Team information
- Current team: UNAN Managua

Senior career*
Years	Team	Apps	(Gls)
- Sporting Cristal
2020–2021	Realidade Jovem		
2021	Botafogo	1	(0)
2021	Deportivo Cuenca		
2022–2023	Sporting Cristal		
2023–	UNAN Managua		

International career^{‡}
2019–	Peru	4	(0)
- * Club domestic league appearances and goals as of 5 June 2021 ‡ National team caps and goals as of 6 August 2019

María José “Maca” López Bellatín (born 22 May 1985) is a Peruvian professional footballer who plays as an attacking midfielder for Nicaraguan club UNAN Managua and the Peru women's national team.

== International career ==
López played for Peru at senior level in the 2019 Pan American Games.
