= Gabrielle Farrell =

Jamaican footballer (born 1997)

Personal information
- Full name: Gabrielle Johna Farrell
- Date of birth: 4 December 1997 (age 28)
- Place of birth: Langhorne, Pennsylvania, U.S.
- Height: 1.63 m (5 ft 4 in)
- Position: Forward

Youth career
- FC Bucks Freedom
- –2015: Neshaminy Redskins

College career
Years	Team	Apps	(Gls)
2016–2019	Liberty Lady Flames	77	(24)

Senior career*
Years	Team	Apps	(Gls)
2020–2021	Spartak Subotica		

International career^{‡}
2020–	Jamaica	1	(0)
- * Club domestic league appearances and goals as of 04:23, 5 February 2020 (UTC) ‡ National team caps and goals as of 04:23, 5 February 2020 (UTC)

Gabrielle Johna Farrell (born 4 December 1997) is an American-born Jamaican footballer who plays as a forward for Serbian SuperLiga club ŽFK Spartak Subotica and the Jamaica women's national team.

== Amateur career ==
Farrell began playing soccer at age four with Hulmeville Soccer Club. She later played for the FC Bucks Freedom club team and helped them win the 2013 Elite Club National League U-15 Northern Conference championship. Farrell attended Neshaminy High School, helping the Redskins soccer team win the state championship in 2013 and earning all-state honors in 2015. She also lettered in basketball and track and field.

Farrell played college soccer for the Liberty Lady Flames from 2016 to 2019. As a freshman in 2016, she was named to the Big South All-Tournament and All-Freshman teams and was named the Big South Rookie of the Year. Farrell was named to the Big South first team in 2016 and second team in 2017, as well as the Atlantic Sun second team in 2018 and first team in 2019. In total, she made 77 appearances for the team, scoring 24 goals and recording 14 assists.

== Professional career ==
In October 2020, Farrell signed with ŽFK Spartak Subotica of the Serbian Women's Super League.

== International career ==
In 2020, Farrell was called up to the Jamaica women's national football team for the first time ahead of the 2020 CONCACAF Women's Olympic Qualifying Championship. She made her international debut on 4 February 2020, coming on as a substitute in the 71st minute for Tiffany Cameron against Saint Kitts and Nevis, with the match finishing as a 7–0 win.

== Personal life ==
Both of Farrell's parents, Paul and Juliet, were born in Jamaica. She graduated from Liberty University with a degree in business marketing in May 2019.
