= Keisilyn Gutiérrez =

Panamanian footballer (born 1997)

Personal information
- Full name: Keisilyn Yorleny Gutiérrez Arenales
- Date of birth: 19 March 1997 (age 29)
- Place of birth: Panama
- Position: Forward

Team information
- Current team: Universitario

Senior career*
Years	Team	Apps	(Gls)
- Universitario

International career^{‡}
	Panama	1+	
- * Club domestic league appearances and goals as of 01:36, 29 January 2020 (UTC) ‡ National team caps and goals as of 01:36, 29 January 2020 (UTC)

Keisilyn Yorleny Gutiérrez Arenales (born 19 March 1997) is a Panamanian footballer who plays as a forward for Universitario and the Panama women's national team.

== Career ==
Gutiérrez has been capped to the Panama women's national team, including an appearance on 28 January 2020 in the 2020 CONCACAF Women's Olympic Qualifying Championship against Costa Rica, which finished as a 1–6 loss.

== Personal life ==
Gutiérrez works as a teacher at the Juan Demóstenes Arosemena Bilingual Education Center in Valle Hermoso, where she teaches pre-kindergarten through 9th grade. She also gives classes at "El Domo" at the University of Panama, and is pursuing a degree in sports education.

== See also ==
- List of Panama women's international footballers
