= Johane Laforte =

Haitian footballer (born 1996)

Personal information
- Full name: Johane Laforte
- Date of birth: 24 February 1996 (age 30)
- Place of birth: Grand-Goâve, Haiti
- Position: Defender

Team information
- Current team: Saint-Denis
- Number: 26

Senior career*
| Years | Team | Apps | (Gls) |
| –2019 | Anacaona SC | | |
| 2020– | Saint-Denis | 2 | (0) |

International career^{‡}
| | Haiti | 1+ | |
- * Club domestic league appearances and goals as of 29 February 2020 ‡ National team caps and goals as of 23:14, 3 February 2020 (UTC)

Johane Laforte (born 24 February 1996) is a Haitian footballer who plays as a defender for French club RC Saint-Denis and the Haiti women's national team.

== International career ==
Laforte has appeared for the Haiti women's national team, including in the 2020 CONCACAF Women's Olympic Qualifying Championship on 3 February 2020 against Panama.
