= Allison Williams (footballer) =

Kittitian footballer (born 1998)

Personal information
- Date of birth: 15 March 1998 (age 28)
- Positions: Right back; midfielder

International career^{‡}
Years	Team	Apps	(Gls)
2018–	Saint Kitts and Nevis	2	(0)
- ‡ National team caps and goals as of 29 January 2020

Allison Williams (born 15 March 1998) is an American-raised Saint Kitts and Nevis footballer who plays as a right back for the Saint Kitts and Nevis women's national team.

== International career ==
Williams played for Saint Kitts and Nevis at senior level in the 2018 CONCACAF Women's Championship qualification. She was a half time substitution in the 0–11 loss to Canada at the 2020 CONCACAF Women's Olympic Qualifying Championship, one of the two biggest defeats in Saint Kitts and Nevis women's national team history.

== Personal life ==
Williams' older sister Lauren is also a member of the Saint Kitts and Nevis women's national football team.
