= 2020 CONCACAF Women's U-17 Championship qualification =

2020 CONCACAF Women's U-17 Championship qualifying stage
Tournament details
- Host countries: Honduras (Group A); Cayman Islands (Group B); Barbados (Group C); Curaçao (Group D)
- Dates: 21–25 August 2019
- Teams: 16 (from 1 confederation)

The 2020 CONCACAF Women's U-17 Championship qualifying stage took place between 21 and 25 August 2019. The teams competed for four of the 20 berths in the 2020 CONCACAF Women's U-17 Championship final tournament.

Players born on or after 1 January 2003 were eligible to compete.

== Teams ==
The qualifying format has changed since the 2018 edition, and the teams are no longer divided into regional zones.

The 41 CONCACAF teams were ranked based on the CONCACAF Women's Under-17 Ranking as of 2018. A total of 32 teams entered the tournament. The highest-ranked 16 entrants were exempt from qualifying and advanced directly to the group stage of the final tournament, while the lowest-ranked 16 entrants had to participate in the qualifying stage, where the four group winners advanced to the round of 16 of the knockout stage of the final tournament.

Exempt from qualifying (16 teams)
Rank	Team	Points
1	Mexico	5,545
2	Canada	5,439
3	United States	5,258
4	Haiti	2,817
5	Costa Rica	2,542
6	Jamaica	2,187
7	Trinidad and Tobago	1,766
8	Guatemala	1,590
9	Puerto Rico	1,160
10	Bermuda	1,043
11	El Salvador	1,006
12	Panama	961
13	Dominican Republic	633
14	Cuba	562
15	Grenada	555
16	Nicaragua	483

Participating in qualifying stage (16 teams)
Rank	Team	Points
17	Bahamas	404
18	Honduras	383
19	Barbados	323
20	Antigua and Barbuda	322
21	Saint Kitts and Nevis	313
22	Saint Lucia	216
23	Curaçao	196
24	Dominica	171
25	Cayman Islands	155
26	U.S. Virgin Islands	146
27	Anguilla	139
28	Guyana	129
29	Belize	95
32	Saint Vincent and the Grenadines	41
34	Bonaire (Note: Non-FIFA members and thus ineligible to play in World Cup.)	0
37	Martinique	0

Did not enter tournament (9 teams)
Rank	Team	Points
30	Suriname	87
31	Aruba	67
33	British Virgin Islands	35
35	French Guiana	0
36	Guadeloupe	0
38	Montserrat	0
39	Sint Maarten	0
40	Saint Martin	0
41	Turks and Caicos Islands	0

== Draw ==
The draw for the group stage took place on 9 May 2019, 11:00 EDT (UTC−4), at the CONCACAF Headquarters in Miami. The 16 teams which entered the qualifying stage were drawn into four groups of four teams. Based on the CONCACAF Women's Under-17 Ranking, the 16 teams were distributed into four pots, as follows:

Pot 1	Pot 2	Pot 3	Pot 4
Bahamas; Honduras; Barbados; Antigua and Barbuda	Saint Kitts and Nevis; Saint Lucia; Curaçao; Dominica	Cayman Islands; U.S. Virgin Islands; Anguilla; Guyana	Belize; Saint Vincent and the Grenadines; Bonaire; Martinique

== Qualifying stage ==
The winners of each group qualify for the final tournament, where they enter the round of 16 of the knockout stage.

Tiebreakers

The ranking of teams in each group is determined as follows (Regulations Article 12.4):

1. Points obtained in all group matches (three points for a win, one for a draw, zero for a loss);
2. Goal difference in all group matches;
3. Number of goals scored in all group matches;
4. Points obtained in the matches played between the teams in question;
5. Goal difference in the matches played between the teams in question;
6. Number of goals scored in the matches played between the teams in question;
7. Fair play points in all group matches (only one deduction could be applied to a player in a single match):
  - Yellow card: −1 points;
  - Indirect red card (second yellow card): −3 points;
  - Direct red card: −4 points;
  - Yellow card and direct red card: −5 points;
8. Drawing of lots.

=== Group A ===
Matches are played at the Estadio Olímpico Metropolitano, San Pedro Sula in Honduras. All times are local, CST (UTC−6).

Pos	Team	Pld	W	D	L	GF	GA	GD	Pts	Qualification
1	Honduras (H)	3	3	0	0	17	0	+17	9	2020 CONCACAF Women's U-17 Championship
2	Saint Lucia	3	2	0	1	18	4	+14	6	
3	Anguilla	3	1	0	2	10	4	+6	3	
4	Bonaire	3	0	0	3	0	37	−37	0	

Source: CONCACAF
Rules for classification: Qualifying stage tiebreakers
(H) Hosts
21 August 2019
16:00

Saint Lucia	2–1	Anguilla
	Report

Estadio Olímpico Metropolitano, San Pedro Sula
21 August 2019
18:30

Honduras	12–0	Bonaire
	Report

Estadio Olímpico Metropolitano, San Pedro Sula

23 August 2019
16:00

Bonaire	0–9	Anguilla
	Report

Estadio Olímpico Metropolitano, San Pedro Sula
23 August 2019
18:30

Honduras	3–0	Saint Lucia
	Report

Estadio Olímpico Metropolitano, San Pedro Sula

25 August 2019
18:00

Saint Lucia	16–0	Bonaire
	Report

Estadio Olímpico Metropolitano, San Pedro Sula
25 August 2019
20:30

Anguilla	0–2	Honduras
	Report

Estadio Olímpico Metropolitano, San Pedro Sula

=== Group B ===
Matches are played at the Truman Bodden Sports Complex, George Town in Cayman Islands. All times are local, EST (UTC−5).

Pos	Team	Pld	W	D	L	GF	GA	GD	Pts	Qualification
1	Cayman Islands (H)	3	2	1	0	16	3	+13	7	2020 CONCACAF Women's U-17 Championship
2	Martinique	3	2	1	0	10	3	+7	7	
3	Antigua and Barbuda	3	0	1	2	3	11	−8	1	
4	Dominica	3	0	1	2	1	13	−12	1	

Source: CONCACAF
Rules for classification: Qualifying stage tiebreakers
(H) Hosts
21 August 2019
17:00

Antigua and Barbuda	2–4	Martinique
	Report

Truman Bodden Sports Complex, George Town
21 August 2019
19:30

Dominica	1–8	Cayman Islands
	Report

Truman Bodden Sports Complex, George Town

23 August 2019
17:00

Antigua and Barbuda	0–0	Dominica
	Report

Truman Bodden Sports Complex, George Town
23 August 2019
19:30

Martinique	1–1	Cayman Islands
Gaydu 10'	Report	Villalobos 67'

Truman Bodden Sports Complex, George Town

25 August 2019
17:00

Dominica	0–5	Martinique
	Report

Truman Bodden Sports Complex, George Town
25 August 2019
19:30

Cayman Islands	7–1	Antigua and Barbuda
	Report

Truman Bodden Sports Complex, George Town

=== Group C ===
Matches are played at the Wildey Turf, Wildey in Barbados. All times are local, AST (UTC−4).

Pos	Team	Pld	W	D	L	GF	GA	GD	Pts	Qualification
1	Belize	3	2	1	0	10	4	+6	7	2020 CONCACAF Women's U-17 Championship
2	Barbados (H)	3	2	1	0	3	1	+2	7	
3	Saint Kitts and Nevis	3	1	0	2	13	5	+8	3	
4	U.S. Virgin Islands	3	0	0	3	0	16	−16	0	

Source: CONCACAF
Rules for classification: Qualifying stage tiebreakers
(H) Hosts
21 August 2019
16:30

Saint Kitts and Nevis	10–0	U.S. Virgin Islands
	Report

Wildey Turf, Wildey
21 August 2019
19:00

Barbados	1–1	Belize
	Report

Wildey Turf, Wildey

23 August 2019
16:30

Belize	5–0	U.S. Virgin Islands
	Report

Wildey Turf, Wildey
23 August 2019
19:00

Barbados	1–0	Saint Kitts and Nevis
	Report

Wildey Turf, Wildey

25 August 2019
16:30

Saint Kitts and Nevis	3–4	Belize
	Report

Wildey Turf, Wildey
25 August 2019
19:00

U.S. Virgin Islands	0–1	Barbados
	Report

Wildey Turf, Wildey

=== Group D ===
Matches are played at the Ergilio Hato Stadium, Willemstad in Curaçao. All times are local, AST (UTC−4).

Pos	Team	Pld	W	D	L	GF	GA	GD	Pts	Qualification
1	Guyana	3	3	0	0	11	4	+7	9	2020 CONCACAF Women's U-17 Championship
2	Bahamas	3	2	0	1	8	4	+4	6	
3	Curaçao (H)	3	0	1	2	3	7	−4	1	
4	Saint Vincent and the Grenadines	3	0	1	2	5	12	−7	1	

Source: CONCACAF
Rules for classification: Qualifying stage tiebreakers
(H) Hosts
21 August 2019
18:00

Bahamas	4–1	Saint Vincent and the Grenadines
	Report

Ergilio Hato Stadium, Willemstad
21 August 2019
20:30

Curaçao	1–2	Guyana
	Report

Ergilio Hato Stadium, Willemstad

23 August 2019
18:00

Saint Vincent and the Grenadines	2–6	Guyana
	Report

Ergilio Hato Stadium, Willemstad
23 August 2019
20:30

Bahamas	3–0	Curaçao
Williams 9'; Davies 50'; Simms 53'	Report

Ergilio Hato Stadium, Willemstad

25 August 2019
17:00

Guyana	3–1	Bahamas
	Report

Ergilio Hato Stadium, Willemstad
25 August 2019
19:30

Curaçao	2–2	Saint Vincent and the Grenadines
	Report

Ergilio Hato Stadium, Willemstad
