= 2018 CONCACAF Women's Championship =

Tournament details
- Host country: United States
- Dates: October 4–17
- Teams: 8 (from 1 confederation)
- Venues: 3 (in 3 host cities)

Final positions
- Champions: United States (8th title)
- Runners-up: Canada
- Third place: Jamaica
- Fourth place: Panama

Tournament statistics
- Matches played: 16
- Goals scored: 83 (5.19 per match)
- Top scorer: (United States) Alex Morgan (7 goals)
- Best player: (United States) Julie Ertz
- Best young player: (Jamaica) Jody Brown
- Best goalkeeper: (Panama) Yenith Bailey
- Fair play award: United States

The 2018 CONCACAF Women's Championship was the 10th edition of the CONCACAF Women's Championship (also known as the CONCACAF Women's Gold Cup or the CONCACAF Women's World Cup Qualifying Tournament), the quadrennial international soccer championship organized by CONCACAF for the women's national teams of the North, Central American and Caribbean region. Eight teams played in the tournament, which took place from October 4 to 17, 2018 in the United States.

The tournament served as the CONCACAF qualifiers to the 2019 FIFA Women's World Cup in France. The top three teams qualified for the World Cup, while the fourth-placed team advanced to a play-off against the third-placed team from the South American confederation, CONMEBOL. It also determined the CONCACAF teams playing at the 2019 Pan American Games women's football tournament in Lima, Peru.

The United States were the defending champions of the competition. They successfully defended their title as hosts, winning the final 2–0 against Canada for their 8th CONCACAF Women's Championship title.

This was the last CONCACAF tournament branded as the "Women's Championship". In August 2019, CONCACAF announced a rebranding of the competition as the CONCACAF W Championship.

== Qualification ==
Regional qualification tournaments were held to determine the teams playing in the final tournament.

=== Qualified teams ===
The following eight teams qualified for the final tournament. Canada, Mexico, and the United States, as members of the North American Football Union (NAFU), qualified automatically. Two teams from the Central American Football Union (UNCAF) and three teams from the Caribbean Football Union (CFU) qualified from their regional qualifying competitions.

Team	Qualification	Appearance	Previous best performance	Previous FIFA Women's World Cup appearances	FIFA ranking at start of event
North American Zone (NAFU)
Canada	Automatic	9th	Champions (1998, 2010)	6	5
Mexico	Automatic	9th	Runners-up (1998, 2010)	3	24
United States (title holders & hosts)	Automatic	9th	Champions (1991, 1993, 1994, 2000, 2002, 2006, 2014)	7	1
Costa Rica	Central American winners	7th	Runners-up (2014)	1	34
Panama	Central American runners-up	3rd	Group stage (2002, 2006)	0	66
Jamaica	Caribbean winners	6th	Fourth place (2006)	0	64
Trinidad and Tobago	Caribbean runners-up	10th	Third place (1991)	0	52
Cuba	Caribbean third place	1st	Debut	0	88

== Venues ==
The venues were announced by CONCACAF on April 8, 2018. Sahlen's Stadium in Cary, North Carolina and H-E-B Park in Edinburg, Texas hosted the group stage matches, while Toyota Stadium in Frisco, Texas hosted the four matches in the knockout stage.

Cary, North Carolina	Edinburg, Texas	Frisco, Texas	2018 CONCACAF Women's Championship is located in the United States
Sahlen's Stadium	H-E-B Park	Toyota Stadium	2018 CONCACAF Women's Championship is located in the United States
Capacity: 10,000	Capacity: 9,735	Capacity: 20,500	2018 CONCACAF Women's Championship is located in the United States

== Draw ==
The draw for the final tournament was held on September 4, 2018, 10:00 EDT (UTC−4), at the Univision Studios in Miami, Florida, United States. The eight teams were drawn into two groups of four teams. They were seeded into four pots. Pot 1 contained the United States, seeded in Group A, and Canada, seeded in Group B. The remaining six teams were allocated to Pots 2–4 based on the CONCACAF Women's Rankings. The two teams from UNCAF could not be drawn into the same group.

Pot 1	Pot 2	Pot 3	Pot 4
United States (Position A1); Canada (Position B1)	Mexico; Costa Rica	Trinidad and Tobago; Jamaica	Panama; Cuba

== Squads ==
The provisional 35-player roster (4 must be goalkeepers) for each team was announced by CONCACAF on September 10, 2018. The final 20-player roster (2 must be goalkeepers) for each team was announced by CONCACAF on September 26, 2018. After the final 20-player roster was submitted, only injury-related changes would be submitted until 24 hours before each team's first match.

== Group stage ==
The top two teams of each group advance to the semi-finals.

Tiebreakers

Teams are ranked according to points (3 points for a win, 1 point for a draw, 0 points for a loss). The rankings of teams in each group are determined as follows (regulations Article 12.12):

1. points obtained in all group matches;
2. goal difference in all group matches;
3. number of goals scored in all group matches;

If two or more teams are equal on the basis of the above three criteria, their rankings are determined as follows:

4. points obtained in the group matches between the teams concerned;
5. goal difference in the group matches between the teams concerned;
6. number of goals scored in the group matches between the teams concerned;
7. fair play points in all group matches:
  - first yellow card: minus 1 point;
  - indirect red card (second yellow card): minus 3 points;
  - direct red card: minus 4 points;
  - yellow card and direct red card: minus 5 points;
8. drawing of lots by CONCACAF.

=== Group A ===
All times are local, EDT (UTC−4).

Pos	Team	Pld	W	D	L	GF	GA	GD	Pts	Qualification
1	United States (H)	3	3	0	0	18	0	+18	9	Knockout stage
2	Panama	3	2	0	1	5	5	0	6	Knockout stage
3	Mexico	3	1	0	2	4	9	−5	3	
4	Trinidad and Tobago	3	0	0	3	1	14	−13	0	

Source: CONCACAF
Rules for classification: Group stage tiebreakers
(H) Hosts
October 4, 2018
17:00

Trinidad and Tobago	0–3	Panama
	Report	Cox 12'; Rangel 68'; Hernández 89'

Sahlen's Stadium, Cary, North Carolina
Referee: Odette Hamilton (Jamaica)
October 4, 2018
19:30

United States	6–0	Mexico
Rapinoe 3', 71'; Ertz 47'; Morgan 57', 80'; Heath 61'	Report

Sahlen's Stadium, Cary, North Carolina
Attendance: 5,404
Referee: Carol Anne Chénard (Canada)

October 7, 2018
17:00

Panama	0–5	United States
	Report	Mewis 6'; Lloyd 23', 29', 48'; Press 32'

Sahlen's Stadium, Cary, North Carolina
Attendance: 7,532
Referee: Tatiana Guzmán (Nicaragua)
October 7, 2018
19:30

Mexico	4–1	Trinidad and Tobago
Corral 33', 62'; Johnson 55'; Sánchez 71'	Report	Cato 50' (pen.)

Sahlen's Stadium, Cary, North Carolina
Referee: Mirian León (El Salvador)

October 10, 2018
17:00

Panama	2–0	Mexico
Riley 47'; Cedeño 85'	Report

Sahlen's Stadium, Cary, North Carolina
Referee: Marie-Soleil Beaudoin (Canada)
October 10, 2018
19:30

Trinidad and Tobago	0–7	United States
	Report	Morgan 9', 50'; Lavelle 41', 43'; Dunn 45'; Horan 49'; Heath 58'

Sahlen's Stadium, Cary, North Carolina
Attendance: 3,996
Referee: Odette Hamilton (Jamaica)

=== Group B ===
All times are local, CDT (UTC−5).

Pos	Team	Pld	W	D	L	GF	GA	GD	Pts	Qualification
1	Canada	3	3	0	0	17	1	+16	9	Knockout stage
2	Jamaica	3	2	0	1	10	2	+8	6	Knockout stage
3	Costa Rica	3	1	0	2	9	4	+5	3	
4	Cuba	3	0	0	3	0	29	−29	0	

Source: CONCACAF
Rules for classification: Group stage tiebreakers
October 5, 2018
17:00

Costa Rica	8–0	Cuba
Herrera 4'; Chinchilla 5', 45+1'; F. Sánchez 19'; S. Cruz 33', 38'; Barrantes 82' (pen.), 90+2'	Report

H-E-B Park, Edinburg, Texas
Referee: Ekaterina Koroleva (United States)
October 5, 2018
19:30

Canada	2–0	Jamaica
Prince 33', 80'	Report

H-E-B Park, Edinburg, Texas
Referee: Francia González (Mexico)

October 8, 2018
17:00

Jamaica	1–0	Costa Rica
Shaw 46'	Report

H-E-B Park, Edinburg, Texas
Referee: Melissa Borjas (Honduras)
October 8, 2018
19:30

Cuba	0–12	Canada
	Report	Leon 11', 23', 55', 59'; Huitema 13', 37', 52', 71'; Rose 25'; Quinn 56'; Sinclair 63'; Matheson 72'

H-E-B Park, Edinburg, Texas
Referee: Crystal Sobers (Trinidad and Tobago)

October 11, 2018
18:30

Cuba	0–9	Jamaica
	Report	Shaw 2'; Brown 26', 38', 72'; Campbell 30', 75'; Blackwood 50' (pen.); Chang 64'; Sweatman 82'

H-E-B Park, Edinburg, Texas
Referee: Crystal Sobers (Trinidad and Tobago)
October 11, 2018
21:00

Costa Rica	1–3	Canada
G. Villalobos 73'	Report	Beckie 25'; Prince 40'; Sinclair 57'

H-E-B Park, Edinburg, Texas
Referee: Lucila Venegas (Mexico)

== Knockout stage ==
In the semi-finals, if the match was level at the end of 90 minutes, no extra time would be played and the match would be decided by a penalty shoot-out. In the third place match and final, if the match was level at the end of 90 minutes, extra time would be played, and if still tied after extra time, the match would be decided by a penalty shoot-out (Regulations Article 12.14).

=== Bracket ===
All times are local, CDT (UTC−5).

Semi-finals
October 14 – Frisco, TX
Panama	0
Canada	7
October 14 – Frisco, TX
United States	6
Jamaica	0

Final
October 17 – Frisco, TX
Canada	0
United States	2
Third place play-off
October 17 – Frisco, TX
Panama	2 (2)
Jamaica (p)	2 (4)

=== Semi-finals ===
October 14, 2018
16:00

Panama	0–7	Canada
	Report	Sinclair 44', 49'; Fleming 47'; Beckie 58'; Quinn 63'; Leon 76', 78'

Toyota Stadium, Frisco, Texas
Referee: Odette Hamilton (Jamaica)

October 14, 2018
19:00

United States	6–0	Jamaica
Heath 2', 29'; Rapinoe 15'; Ertz 21'; Morgan 33', 84' (pen.)	Report

Toyota Stadium, Frisco, Texas
Attendance: 7,555
Referee: Francia González (Mexico)

Canada and United States qualified for 2019 FIFA Women's World Cup. Panama and Jamaica entered into the third place play-off.

=== Third place play-off ===
October 17, 2018
16:00

Panama	2–2 (a.e.t.)	Jamaica
Mills 74'; Cedeño 115'	Report	Shaw 14'; Brown 95'
Penalties
Pinzón (penalty scored); Hernández (penalty scored); Cedeño (penalty missed); Rangel (penalty missed)	2–4	(penalty scored) Blackwood; (penalty scored) Shim; (penalty scored) Chang; (penalty scored) Bond-Flasza

Toyota Stadium, Frisco, Texas
Referee: Carol Anne Chénard (Canada)

Jamaica qualified for 2019 FIFA Women's World Cup. Panama entered CONCACAF–CONMEBOL play-off vs. Argentina.

=== Final ===
October 17, 2018
19:00

Canada	0–2	United States
	Report	Lavelle 2'; Morgan 89'

Toyota Stadium, Frisco, Texas
Attendance: 6,986
Referee: Lucila Venegas (Mexico)

2018 CONCACAF Women's Championship winners

United States
8th title

== Awards ==
=== Individual awards ===
The following awards were given at the conclusion of the tournament.

Award	Player
Golden Ball	(United States) Julie Ertz
Golden Boot	(United States) Alex Morgan (7 goals)
Golden Glove	(Panama) Yenith Bailey
Young Player	(Jamaica) Jody Brown
Fair Play	United States

Best XI
Goalkeepers	Defenders	Midfielders	Forwards
(Panama) Yenith Bailey	(United States) Kelley O'Hara; (Canada) Quinn (Note: Then known as Rebecca Quinn); (United States) Abby Dahlkemper; (United States) Crystal Dunn	(Canada) Jessie Fleming; (United States) Julie Ertz; (United States) Lindsey Horan	(United States) Tobin Heath; (United States) Alex Morgan; (United States) Megan Rapinoe

== Goalscorers ==
There were 83 goals scored in 16 matches, for an average of 5.19 goals per match.

7 goals

- (United States) Alex Morgan

6 goals

- (Canada) Adriana Leon

4 goals

- (Canada) Jordyn Huitema
- (Canada) Christine Sinclair
- (Jamaica) Jody Brown
- (United States) Tobin Heath

3 goals

- (Canada) Nichelle Prince
- (Jamaica) Khadija Shaw
- (United States) Rose Lavelle
- (United States) Carli Lloyd
- (United States) Megan Rapinoe

2 goals

- (Canada) Janine Beckie
- (Canada) Quinn
- (Costa Rica) María Barrantes
- (Costa Rica) Priscila Chinchilla
- (Costa Rica) Shirley Cruz
- (Jamaica) Sashana Campbell
- (Mexico) Charlyn Corral
- (Panama) Lineth Cedeño
- (United States) Julie Ertz

1 goal

- (Canada) Jessie Fleming
- (Canada) Diana Matheson
- (Canada) Deanne Rose
- (Costa Rica) Melissa Herrera
- (Costa Rica) Fabiola Sánchez
- (Costa Rica) Gloriana Villalobos
- (Jamaica) Deneisha Blackwood
- (Jamaica) Christina Chang
- (Jamaica) Marlo Sweatman
- (Mexico) Katie Johnson
- (Mexico) María Sánchez
- (Panama) Marta Cox
- (Panama) Erika Hernández
- (Panama) Natalia Mills
- (Panama) Kenia Rangel
- (Panama) Karla Riley
- (Trinidad and Tobago) Jonelle Cato
- (United States) Crystal Dunn
- (United States) Lindsey Horan
- (United States) Sam Mewis
- (United States) Christen Press

== Qualification for international tournaments ==
=== Qualified teams for FIFA Women's World Cup ===
The following three teams from CONCACAF qualified for the 2019 FIFA Women's World Cup. Panama failed to qualify losing out the play-off to 2018 Copa América Femenina third-placed team, Argentina.

Team	Qualified on	Previous appearances in FIFA Women's World Cup^{1}
Canada	14 October 2018	6 (1995, 1999, 2003, 2007, 2011, 2015)
United States	14 October 2018	7 (**1991**, 1995, **1999**, 2003, 2007, 2011, **2015**)
Jamaica	17 October 2018	0 (debut)

^{1} Bold indicates champions for that year. Italic indicates hosts for that year.

=== Qualified teams for Pan American Games ===
The tournament was used to determine the four teams from CONCACAF which would qualify for the 2019 Pan American Games women's football tournament. The top team from each of the three zones, i.e., Caribbean (CFU), Central American (UNCAF), and North American (NAFU), would qualify, with the fourth team to be determined by CONCACAF at a later date. However, both United States and Canada declined to participate to focus on the 2019 FIFA Women's World Cup, so Mexico qualified for the North American berth.

Team	Zone	Qualified on	Previous appearances in Pan American Games^{2}
Jamaica	CFU	11 October 2018	1 (2007)
Panama	UNCAF	11 October 2018	1 (2007)
Mexico	NAFU	2019 (confirmed by CONCACAF)	5 (1999, 2003, 2007, 2011, 2015)
Costa Rica	UNCAF	2019 (confirmed by CONCACAF)	4 (1999, 2003, 2011, 2015)

^{2} Bold indicates champions for that year. Italic indicates hosts for that year.

== Controversy ==
In the 89th minute of the final match, Alex Morgan was offside when she scored the second goal for the USA, but the referee did not invalidate the goal. Video assistant referee was not used in this tournament.
