= Cloey Uddenberg =

St. Kitts & Nevis footballer (born 2002)

Personal information
- Full name: Cloey Elaine Uddenberg
- Date of birth: 13 November 2002 (age 23)
- Place of birth: Richmond Hill, Ontario, Canada
- Height: 1.63 m (5 ft 4 in)
- Positions: Defender; midfielder

Team information
- Current team: AFC Toronto
- Number: 22

Youth career
- Oak Ridges SC
- Aurora Stingers

College career
Years	Team	Apps	(Gls)
2021–2022	Guelph Gryphons	20	(2)
2023	South Alabama Jaguars	18	(0)
2024	Purdue Boilermakers	18	(1)

Senior career*
Years	Team	Apps	(Gls)
2017–2019	Aurora FC	24	(2)
2021	Guelph Union	5	(1)
2022–2024	Simcoe County Rovers	59	(14)
2025–	AFC Toronto	30	(3)

International career^{‡}
2019	Saint Kitts and Nevis U17	1	(0)
2017–	Saint Kitts and Nevis U20	7+	(0+)
2018–	Saint Kitts and Nevis	12+	(9)
- * Club domestic league appearances and goals as of October 28, 2026 ‡ National team caps and goals as of 21 August 2019

Cloey Elaine Uddenberg (born 13 November 2002) is a footballer who plays as a midfielder for AFC Toronto in the Northern Super League. Born in Canada, she represents Saint Kitts and Nevis at international level.

== University career ==
In 2020, she began attending the University of Guelph, playing for the women's soccer team. In her rookie season in 2021 (the 2020 season was cancelled due to the COVID-19 pandemic), she was OUA and U Sports Rookie of the Year, OUA West Player of the Year, and was named to the Second Team All-Canadian and U Sports All-Rookie team. She became the first Guelph player to ever win the national Rookie of the Year Award. In 2022, she was named an OUA West First Team All-Star.

In 2023, she transferred to the University of South Alabama, where she joined the women's soccer team.

In 2024, she transferred to Purdue University to play for the women's soccer team. On August 25, 2024, she scored her first NCAA Division I goal in a victory over the UIC Flames. She played in all 18 games for Purdue in her sole season with the team.

== Club career ==
Uddenberg played for League1 Ontario side Aurora FC from 2017 to 2019.

In 2021, she played for Guelph Union. She scored one goal on August 24, against Unionville Milliken SC.

In 2022, she joined Simcoe County Rovers FC. She was named a league First Team All-Star in 2022. In 2023, she was named the league's Midfielder of the Year and a league First Team All-Star. In 2024, she became the club's all-time appearance leader.

In November 2024, she signed a professional contract with AFC Toronto in the Northern Super League for the 2025 season. She scored her first NSL goal on July 10, 2025, against Ottawa Rapid FC.

== International career ==
Eligible for Canada and St. Kitts and Nevis, Uddenberg was encouraged to try out for the St. Kitts and Nevis team by her father.

Uddenberg represented St Kitts and Nevis at the 2020 CONCACAF Women's U-17 Championship qualifying stage and two CONCACAF Women's U-20 Championship qualifiers (2018 and 2019).

She also represents the Saint Kitts and Nevis senior team. She scored a hat trick against Grenada on May 23, 2018 at the 2018 CONCACAF Women's Championship qualification. She scored another hat trick on October 8, 2019 against Antigua and Barbuda at the 2020 CONCACAF Women's Olympic Qualifying Championship qualification.

=== International goals ===
Scores and results list Saint Kitts and Nevis's goal tally first

No.	Date	Venue	Opponent	Score	Result	Competition
1	23 May 2018	Ato Boldon Stadium, Couva, Trinidad and Tobago	Grenada	1–0	10–0	2018 CONCACAF Women's Championship qualification
2	23 May 2018	Ato Boldon Stadium, Couva, Trinidad and Tobago	Grenada	3–0	10–0	2018 CONCACAF Women's Championship qualification
3	23 May 2018	Ato Boldon Stadium, Couva, Trinidad and Tobago	Grenada	6–0	10–0	2018 CONCACAF Women's Championship qualification
4	27 May 2018	Ato Boldon Stadium, Couva, Trinidad and Tobago	U.S. Virgin Islands	7–0	7–0	2018 CONCACAF Women's Championship qualification
5	4 October 2019	Ato Boldon Stadium, Couva, Trinidad and Tobago	Aruba	4–0	6–1	2020 CONCACAF Women's Olympic Qualifying Championship qualification
6	4 October 2019	Ato Boldon Stadium, Couva, Trinidad and Tobago	Aruba	5–0	6–1	2020 CONCACAF Women's Olympic Qualifying Championship qualification
7	8 October 2019	Ato Boldon Stadium, Couva, Trinidad and Tobago	Antigua and Barbuda	2–0	10–0	2020 CONCACAF Women's Olympic Qualifying Championship qualification
8	8 October 2019	Ato Boldon Stadium, Couva, Trinidad and Tobago	Antigua and Barbuda	3–0	10–0	2020 CONCACAF Women's Olympic Qualifying Championship qualification
9	8 October 2019	Ato Boldon Stadium, Couva, Trinidad and Tobago	Antigua and Barbuda	4–0	10–0	2020 CONCACAF Women's Olympic Qualifying Championship qualification

== Personal life ==
Uddenberg's paternal grandparents hail from Saint Kitts and Nevis. Her sisters, Kayla and Carley, are also members of the Saint Kitts and Nevis women's national football team.

Uddenberg attended what is now called Our Lady Queen of the World Catholic Academy in Richmond Hill, Ontario
