= María Murillo (footballer) =

Panamanian footballer (born 1996)

Personal information
- Date of birth: 15 December 1996 (age 29)
- Place of birth: Panama City, Panama
- Height: 1.73 m (5 ft 8 in)
- Position: Defender

Senior career*
Years	Team	Apps	(Gls)
2017	Arenal Coronado		

International career^{‡}
2018	Panama	8	(0)
- * Club domestic league appearances and goals ‡ National team caps and goals as of 9 July 2019

María Murillo (born 15 December 1996) is a Panamanian international footballer who plays as a defender for the Panama women's national football team. She appeared in four matches for Panama at the 2018 CONCACAF Women's Championship.

== See also ==
- List of Panama women's international footballers
