= Erika Hernández =

Panamanian footballer (born 1999)

Personal information
- Full name: Erika Janeth Hernández Díaz
- Date of birth: 17 March 1999 (age 27)
- Place of birth: Panama City, Panama
- Height: 1.60 m (5 ft 3 in)
- Position: Forward

Team information
- Current team: Plaza Amador

Senior career*
Years	Team	Apps	(Gls)
2021	UAI Urquiza		
2022–	Plaza Amador		

International career^{‡}
2017–	Panama	10	(2)
- * Club domestic league appearances and goals ‡ National team caps and goals as of 9 July 2019

Erika Janeth Hernández Díaz (born 17 March 1999) is a Panamanian footballer who plays as a forward for CD Plaza Amador and the Panama women's national team. She is nicknamed Siri.

== International career ==
Hernández appeared in five matches for Panama and scored one goal at the 2018 CONCACAF Women's Championship.

== International goals ==
No.	Date	Venue	Opponent	Score	Result	Competition
1.	10 November 2022	Estadio Municipal de Chapín, Jerez de la Frontera, Spain	Venezuela	2–0	3–1	Friendly
2.	26 June 2023	Victoria Stadium, Gibraltar	Gibraltar	4–0	7–0	Friendly

== See also ==
- List of Panama women's international footballers
