= Madiya Harriott =

Jamaican footballer (born 1999)

Personal information
- Full name: Madiya Beth Harriott
- Date of birth: 16 February 1999 (age 27)
- Place of birth: United States
- Position: Defender

Team information
- Current team: Vanderbilt Commodores
- Number: 3

College career
| Years | Team | Apps | (Gls) |
| 2017–2020 | Vanderbilt Commodores | 65 | (2) |

International career^{‡}
| 2018 | Jamaica U20 | 2 | (0) |
| 2019– | Jamaica | 3 | (0) |
- ‡ National team caps and goals as of 30 June 2021

Madiya Beth Harriott (born 16 February 1999) is a US-born Jamaican footballer who plays as a defender for college team Vanderbilt Commodores and the Jamaica women's national team.

== Early life ==
Harriott was born to a Jamaican father. She was raised in Davie, Florida.

== College career ==
Harriott attends Vanderbilt University in Nashville, Tennessee.

== International career ==
Harriott has represented Jamaica on the senior national team as well as the under-20 national team. She competed at the 2018 CONCACAF Women's U-20 Championship. She made her senior debut on 28 July 2019 against Mexico in the Pan American Games.
