= Our Lady Queen of the World Catholic Academy =

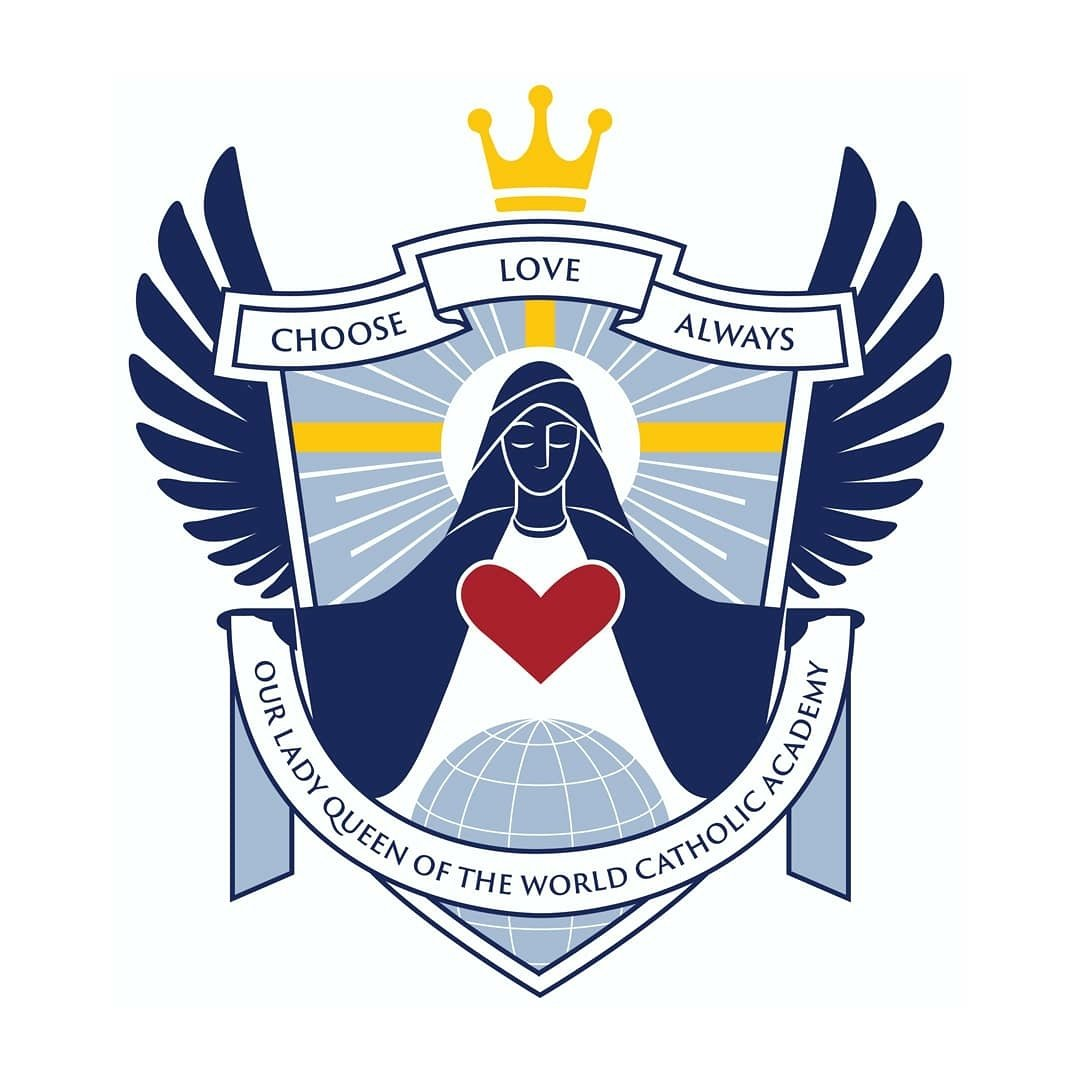

Location
- 10475 Bayview Avenue; York Region; Richmond Hill, Ontario, L4C 3P2; Canada; 43.8867°N 79.4168°W

Information
- Former name: Jean Vanier Catholic High School
- School type: High School
- Motto: Choose Love Always
- Religious affiliation: Catholic
- Patron saint: Virgin Mary
- Established: 2009
- Status: Open
- School board: York Catholic District School Board
- Superintendent: Joel Chiutsi
- Area trustee: Maria Iafrate, Dominic Mazzotta
- Principal: John Heinrich
- Grades: 9-12
- Enrollment: 1089 (October 2023)
- Language: English
- Hours in school day: 8:20-2:18
- Colours: Navy, Jaguar Blue & White
- Mascot: Crusher
- Team name: OLQW Jaguars
- Website: olqwh.ycdsb.ca

Our Lady Queen of the World Catholic Academy is a Catholic school high located in Richmond Hill, Ontario, Canada. It operates under the administration of the York Catholic District School Board (YCDSB), which oversees Catholic education in the region. The school was officially established and opened in 2009 to meet the needs of the growing Catholic population in Richmond Hill. Named in honor of the Virgin Mary under the title "Queen of the World," the academy reflects a strong commitment to faith-based learning, academic excellence, and community service.

Our Lady Queen of the World Catholic Academy offers the AP (Advanced Placement) and pre-AP program for students. Students in the regular program have the opportunity to participate in differentiated courses in English, Mathematics, Science, Social Sciences, Music, Arts, Drama, Computer Studies, and Physical Education.

The school celebrated its 15th anniversary in 2024.

== Name ==
The school renamed to "Our Lady Queen of the World Catholic Academy", which refers to Mary, mother of Jesus and is also the name of the church beside the school. The school was previously known as Jean Vanier Catholic High School, but a proposal to rename it was presented to the YCDSB trustees in February 2020 and the resolution to do so passed at a board meeting on 20 May 2020. This was done as a result of allegations that the school's namesake Jean Vanier had engaged in "manipulative and emotionally abusive" sexual relationships with six women between 1970 and 2005.

== Notable Alumni ==
- Cloey Uddenberg professional footballer

== See also ==
- Education in Ontario
- List of secondary schools in Ontario
- Virgin Mary
- Christianity in Canada
