= Priscilla Tapia =

Costa Rican footballer (born 1991)

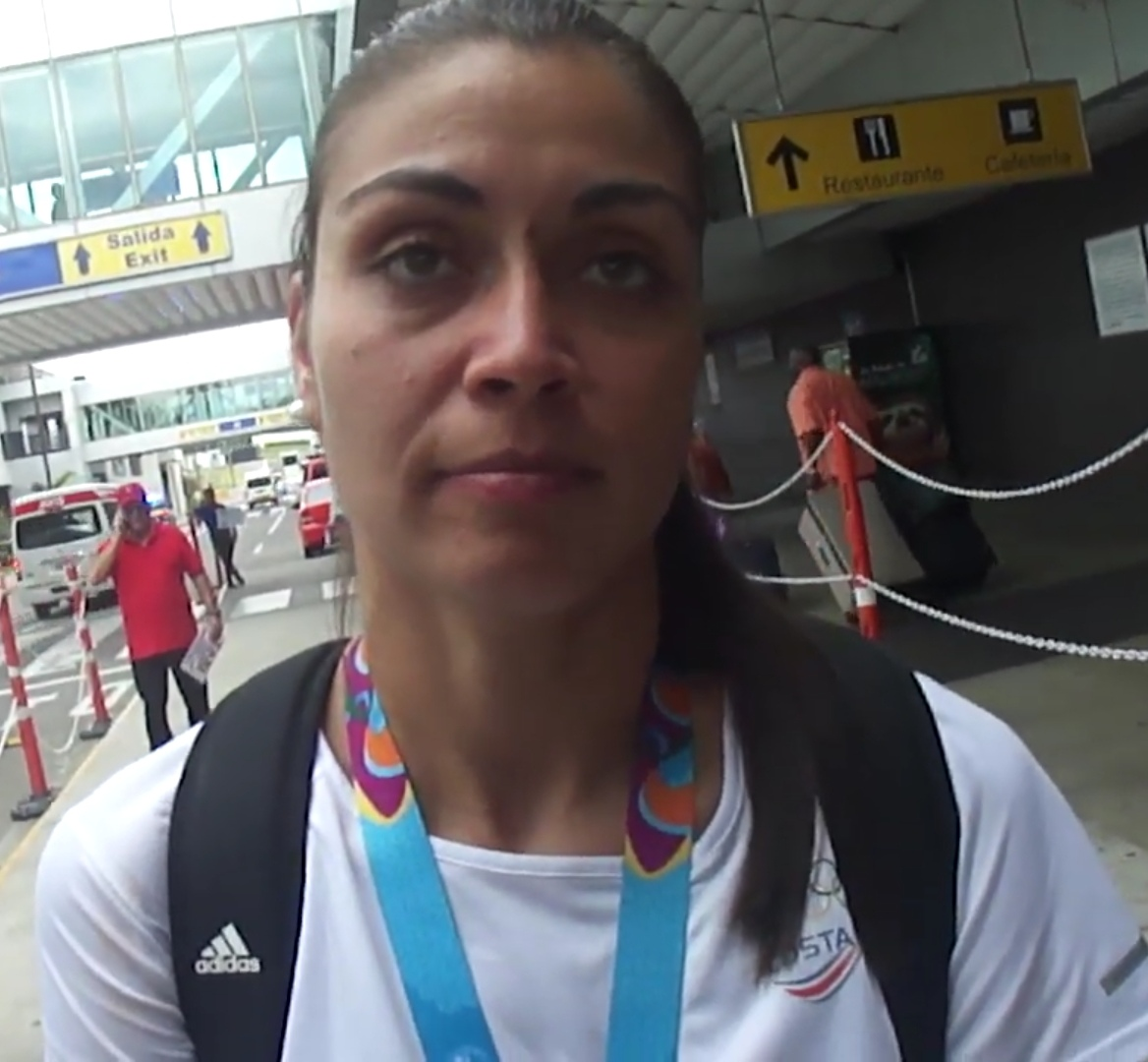
- Tapia in 2019

Personal information
- Full name: Priscilla Natalia Tapia Castillo
- Date of birth: 2 May 1991 (age 35)
- Place of birth: Puntarenas, Costa Rica
- Height: 1.73 m (5 ft 8 in)
- Position: Goalkeeper

Team information
- Current team: Saprissa

Senior career*
Years	Team	Apps	(Gls)
2008–2012	UCEM Alajuela		
2012–2015	Dimas Escazú		
2015–2019	AD Moravia		
2020–2021	Herediano		
2021	Deportivo Cali		
2022–2023	Herediano		
2023–	Saprissa		

International career^{‡}
2009–2010	Costa Rica U20	12	(0)
2010–	Costa Rica	2	(0)
Medal record
Women's football
Representing Costa Rica
Pan American Games
Bronze medal – third place	2019 Lima	Team
- * Club domestic league appearances and goals ‡ National team caps and goals as of 1 November 2010

Priscilla Natalia Tapia Castillo (born 2 May 1991) is a Costa Rican footballer who plays as a goalkeeper for Deportivo Saprissa the Costa Rica women's national team.
