= Sasha Fábrega =

Panamanian footballer (born 1990)

Personal information
- Full name: Sasha Jeaneth Fábrega Bósquez
- Date of birth: 23 October 1990 (age 36)
- Place of birth: Santiago, Panama
- Height: 1.70 m (5 ft 7 in)
- Position: Goalkeeper

Team information
- Current team: Independiente La Chorrera

Senior career*
Years	Team	Apps	(Gls)
- Tauro
- Independiente La Chorrera

International career^{‡}
2020–	Panama	1+	(0)
- * Club domestic league appearances and goals as of 02:20, 1 February 2020 (UTC) ‡ National team caps and goals as of 02:20, 1 February 2020 (UTC)

Sasha Jeaneth Fábrega Bósquez (born 23 October 1990) is a Panamanian footballer who plays as a goalkeeper for CA Independiente de La Chorrera and the Panama women's national team.

== Career ==
Fábrega has appeared for the Panama women's national team, including in the 2020 CONCACAF Women's Olympic Qualifying Championship on 31 January 2020 against the United States, coming on as a substitute in the 33rd minute for the injured Yenith Bailey.

== See also ==
- List of Panama women's international footballers
