= Amarelis De Mera =

Panamanian footballer and manager (born 1985)

Personal information
- Full name: Amarelis Yorlene De Mera Lasso
- Date of birth: 28 March 1985 (age 41)
- Place of birth: Panama
- Position: Forward

Team information
- Current team: Hapoel Marmorek Rehovot
- Number: 28

Senior career*
Years	Team	Apps	(Gls)
- Universidad Tecnológica de Panamá
- ULACIT
- Lady's Sport
2005–2006	L'Estartit		
- ULACIT
- Chorrillo FC
- Cosmos de la Chorrera
- Santa Clarita Blue Heat
- Atlético Nacional (Panama)
2017–2018	San Francisco	?	(9)
2019–2021	Tauro FC	?	(37)
2021–	Hapoel Marmorek Rehovot	2	(0)

International career^{‡}
2002–	Panama	8	(5)
- * Club domestic league appearances and goals as of 4 November 2021 ‡ National team caps and goals as of 13:33, 13 March 2015 (UTC)

Amarelis Yorlene De Mera Lasso (born 28 March 1985) is a Panamanian footballer and coach who plays as a forward for Israeli club Hapoel Marmorek Rehovot and the Panama women's national team. She played for the American team, Santa Clarita Blue Heat, in the USL W-League.

== See also ==
- List of Panama women's international footballers
