= María Guevara =

Panamanian footballer (born 2000)

Personal information
- Full name: María Virginia Guevara Sánchez
- Date of birth: 4 October 2000 (age 26)
- Place of birth: Panama
- Position: Midfielder

Team information
- Current team: Hapoel Marmorek Rehovot
- Number: 27

Senior career*
Years	Team	Apps	(Gls)
- Universitario
2021–	Hapoel Marmorek Rehovot	2	(0)

International career^{‡}
	Panama	2+	
- * Club domestic league appearances and goals as of 4 November 2021 ‡ National team caps and goals as of 00:22, 29 January 2020 (UTC)

María Virginia Guevara Sánchez (born 4 October 2000) is a Panamanian footballer who plays as a midfielder for Israeli club Hapoel Marmorek Rehovot and the Panama women's national team.

== Career ==
Guevara has appeared for the Panama women's national team, including in the 2020 CONCACAF Women's Olympic Qualifying Championship qualification against Guatemala. She also appeared at the 2020 CONCACAF Women's Olympic Qualifying Championship against Costa Rica.

== See also ==
- List of Panama women's international footballers
