= 2024 CONCACAF W Gold Cup qualification =

Tournament details
- Dates: League stage: September 20 – December 5, 2023; Play-offs: February 17, 2024
- Teams: 34 (from 1 confederation)

Tournament statistics
- Matches played: 86
- Goals scored: 353 (4.1 per match)
- Top scorer(s): (El Salvador) Brenda Cerén (Haiti) Melchie Dumornay (8 goals each)

The 2024 CONCACAF W Gold Cup qualification competition, also known as the Road to CONCACAF W Gold Cup, was a women's football tournament that was contested by 34 of the senior women's national teams of the member associations of CONCACAF. The competition decided six of the twelve participating teams of the 2024 CONCACAF W Gold Cup, the inaugural edition of the W Gold Cup.

The league stage of the qualifying was played from September 20 to December 5, 2023, with the three League A group winners qualifying for the final tournament. Three additional teams qualified via the play-off round, contested on February 17, 2024, by the League A group runners-up and the League B group winners. These six teams joined the two CONCACAF teams qualified for the Olympics and four guests at the W Gold Cup, to be contested from February 20 to March 10, 2024.

== Format ==
On December 10, 2020, the CONCACAF Council approved the structure and calendar of the competition. The qualification competition, known as the "Road to Concacaf W Gold Cup", began with the group stage, featuring 34 women's national teams of CONCACAF split into three leagues (A, B and C). Each league featured three groups, containing three teams each in League A, and four teams each in Leagues B and C. The teams in each group played against each other home-and-away in a double round-robin format. The top three teams in League A qualified directly for the W Gold Cup. The three group runners-up of League A and the three League B group winners participated in a play-off on February 17, 2024, to compete for the final three spots at the W Gold Cup. The play-offs were originally planned to take place in March 2024, but were moved to February to accommodate the W Gold Cup final tournament also being moved (from June to February and March 2024). The two CONCACAF women's national teams that qualify for the Summer Olympics in 2024 (the United States and Canada) received a bye directly to the W Gold Cup, skipping qualification.

=== Tiebreakers ===
Teams were ranked according to points (3 points for a win, 1 point for a draw, 0 points for a loss). The rankings of teams in each group were determined as follows (regulations Articles 12.3):

1. points obtained in all group matches;
2. goal difference in all group matches;
3. number of goals scored in all group matches;

If two or more teams were equal on the basis of the above three criteria, their rankings were determined as follows:

4. points obtained in the group matches between the teams concerned;
5. goal difference in the group matches between the teams concerned;
6. number of goals scored in the group matches between the teams concerned;
7. lowest fair play points in all group matches:
  - first yellow card: minus 1 point;
  - indirect red card (second yellow card): minus 3 points;
  - direct red card: minus 4 points;
  - yellow card and direct red card: minus 5 points;
8. drawing of lots by CONCACAF.

== Seeding ==
Of the 41 CONCACAF member associations, 34 entered into the qualification competition, while the two CONCACAF teams that qualified for the Summer Olympics (the United States and Canada) advanced directly to the final competition.

On April 27, 2023, CONCACAF announced 33 countries had entered into the qualifying competition (including Jamaica, the loser of the CONCACAF Olympic play-off). The teams were split into leagues and pots based on the CONCACAF Women's Ranking of March 2023, with League A containing nine teams and Leagues B and C containing twelve teams. On May 11, the CONCACAF Council approved the late entries of Bonaire, Cuba and Saint Lucia into the competition. To preserve the integrity of the leagues, these teams were placed in League C regardless of their ranking, though the pots were updated based on the ranking of the new teams. At the same time, the British Virgin Islands and Sint Maarten (originally in League C, pot 3) were confirmed to have withdrawn from the competition, bringing the total number of qualifying entrants to 34, and the number of teams in League C to thirteen. To accommodate the newly added teams, League C was expanded from three groups of four teams to one group of four teams (Group A) and three groups of three teams (Groups B, C and D).

The draw for the group stage took place on May 17, 2023, 19:00 EDT, in Miami, Florida, United States. Teams were split into three pots of three teams in League A, four pots of three teams in League B, and three pots of four teams and one pot of one team in League C. The pots were drawn from sequentially, with drawn teams assigned to groups in ascending order.

Qualified to final tournament
Team	Pts	Rank
United States	7,699	1
Canada (Note: The result of the CONCACAF Olympic play-off was not known at the time of the draw.)	5,231	2

League A
Pot	Team	Pts	Rank
1	Costa Rica	3,831	3
1	Jamaica	3,496	4
1	Mexico	3,085	5
2	Panama	2,381	6
2	Haiti	2,235	7
2	Trinidad and Tobago	2,231	8
3	Guatemala	1,121	9
3	Puerto Rico	958	11
3	Saint Kitts and Nevis	943	12

League B
Pot	Team	Pts	Rank
1	El Salvador	846	13
1	Guyana	844	14
1	Dominican Republic	823	15
2	Bermuda	820	16
2	Nicaragua	777	17
2	Antigua and Barbuda	722	18
3	Honduras	556	19
3	Suriname	499	20
3	Saint Vincent and the Grenadines	427	21
4	Martinique	409	22
4	Barbados	405	23
4	Dominica	365	24

League C
Pot	Team	Pts	Rank
1	Cuba (Note: Late entry accepted, placed into League C regardless of ranking)	1,080	10
1	U.S. Virgin Islands	332	25
1	Belize	324	26
1	Curaçao	318	27
2	Cayman Islands	305	28
2	Saint Lucia	301	29
2	Aruba	274	30
2	Grenada	165	31
3	Anguilla	133	32
3	Turks and Caicos Islands	122	33
3	Guadeloupe	23	35
3	Bahamas	0	36
4	Bonaire	0	37

Did not enter
Team	Pts	Rank
British Virgin Islands (Note: Initially entered (placed in League C, pot 3), but withdrew before the draw)	62	34
French Guiana	0	38
Montserrat	0	39
Sint Maarten	0	40
Saint Martin	0	41

== Schedule ==
The fixtures for the 2024 CONCACAF W Gold Cup qualification competition were announced by CONCACAF on July 5, 2023.

Stage	Round	FIFA match window
League stage	Matchday 1	September 20–26, 2023
League stage	Matchday 2	September 20–26, 2023
League stage	Matchday 3	October 25–31, 2023
League stage	Matchday 4	October 25–31, 2023
League stage	Matchday 5	November 29 – December 5, 2023
League stage	Matchday 6	November 29 – December 5, 2023
Play-offs	Play-off	February 17, 2024

== League A ==
=== Group A ===
Pos	Team	Pld	W	D	L	GF	GA	GD	Pts	Qualification	(Mexico)	(Puerto Rico)	(Trinidad and Tobago)
1	Mexico	4	4	0	0	12	1	+11	12	Qualification for 2024 CONCACAF W Gold Cup	—	2–1	6–0
2	Puerto Rico	4	1	1	2	3	6	−3	4	Advance to play-offs	0–3	—	0–0
3	Trinidad and Tobago	4	0	1	3	1	9	−8	1		0–1	1–2	—

Source: CONCACAF
September 22, 2023
22:00 (20:00 UTC−6)

Mexico	2–1	Puerto Rico
Sánchez 45+1'; Camberos 59'	Report	Ki. Rodríguez 11' (o.g.)

Estadio Azteca, Mexico City
Attendance: 13,882
Referee: Tatiana Guzmán (Nicaragua)

September 26, 2023
22:00 (22:00 UTC−6)

Mexico	6–0	Trinidad and Tobago
Sánchez 3'; Espinoza 10'; Cervantes 19', 42'; Delgado 25'; Corral 39'	Report

Estadio Hidalgo, Pachuca
Referee: Natalie Simon (United States)

October 27, 2023

Trinidad and Tobago	1–2	Puerto Rico
Alí 49'	Report	Rodríguez 30'; Aguilera 54'

Hasely Crawford Stadium, Port of Spain
Referee: Sandra Benítez (El Salvador)

October 31, 2023

Puerto Rico	0–0	Trinidad and Tobago
	Report

Juan Ramón Loubriel Stadium, Bayamón
Referee: Merlin Vanessa Soto (Honduras)

December 1, 2023
20:00

Puerto Rico	0–3	Mexico
	Report	Mauleón 47'; Palacios 63', 90+2'

Juan Ramón Loubriel Stadium, Bayamón
Referee: Carly Shaw-MacLaren (Canada)

December 5, 2023
19:00

Trinidad and Tobago	0–1	Mexico
	Report	Ferral 40'

Hasely Crawford Stadium, Port of Spain
Referee: Melissa Borjas (Honduras)

=== Group B ===
Pos	Team	Pld	W	D	L	GF	GA	GD	Pts	Qualification	(Panama)	(Guatemala)	(Jamaica)
1	Panama	4	2	1	1	8	5	+3	7	Qualification for 2024 CONCACAF W Gold Cup	—	2–3	2–1
2	Guatemala	4	1	2	1	6	8	−2	5	Advance to play-offs	0–3	—	1–1
3	Jamaica	4	0	3	1	5	6	−1	3		1–1	2–2	—

Source: CONCACAF
September 20, 2023
20:00 (18:00 UTC−6)

Guatemala	0–3	Panama
	Report	Tanner 35'; Cox 74'; Montenegro 82'

Estadio Pensativo, Antigua
Referee: Carly Shaw-MacLaren (Canada)

September 24, 2023
19:00 (18:00 UTC−5)

Panama	2–3	Guatemala
Castillo 38'; Tanner 40'	Report	Monterroso 17'; Martínez 67', 90'

Estadio Universitario, Penonomé
Referee: Francia González (Mexico)

October 25, 2023

Panama	2–1	Jamaica
Keene 44' (o.g.); Cedeño 84'	Report	Walker 21'

Estadio Rommel Fernández, Panama City
Referee: Mirian León (El Salvador)

October 29, 2023

Jamaica	2–2	Guatemala
Johnson 32'; Vidaurre 52'	Report	Ramírez 28'; Solórzano 56'

Independence Park, Kingston
Referee: Diana Pérez (Mexico)

November 29, 2023
20:00 (19:00 UTC-5)

Jamaica	1–1	Panama
Buckley 45'	Report	Cox 30' (pen.)

Independence Park, Kingston
Referee: Melissa Borjas (Honduras)

December 3, 2023
20:00 (18:00 UTC-6)

Guatemala	1–1	Jamaica
Martínez 10' (pen.)	Report	Richards 66'

Estadio Doroteo Guamuch Flores, Guatemala City
Referee: Katia García (Mexico)

=== Group C ===
Pos	Team	Pld	W	D	L	GF	GA	GD	Pts	Qualification	(Costa Rica)	(Haiti)	(Saint Kitts and Nevis)
1	Costa Rica	4	3	0	1	32	2	+30	9	Qualification for 2024 CONCACAF W Gold Cup	—	2–1	11–0
2	Haiti	4	3	0	1	26	2	+24	9	Advance to play-offs	1–0	—	13–0
3	Saint Kitts and Nevis	4	0	0	4	0	54	−54	0		0–19	0–11	—

Source: CONCACAF
September 21, 2023
20:00

Haiti	1–0	Costa Rica
Mondésir 70'	Report

Estadio Olímpico Félix Sánchez, Santo Domingo (Dominican Republic)
Referee: Myriam Marcotte (Canada)

September 25, 2023
21:00 (19:00 UTC−6)

Costa Rica	11–0	Saint Kitts and Nevis
Elizondo 4'; M. Herrera 9', 73', 80'; Rodríguez 22', 58' (pen.); Pinell 24'; Chinchilla 25', 40', 67'; G. Villalobos 43'	Report

Estadio Alejandro Morera Soto, Alajuela
Referee: Astrid Gramajo (Guatemala)

October 26, 2023

Saint Kitts and Nevis	0–11	Haiti
	Report	Dumornay 13', 29', 32', 45+5', 55'; Mondésir 20' (pen.), 44', 89'; K. Louis 26'; Borgella 36'; Joseph 90+2'

SKNFA Technical Center, Basseterre
Referee: Tori Penso (United States)

October 30, 2023

Haiti	13–0	Saint Kitts and Nevis
K. Louis 4', 17'; B. Louis 8', 20', 26', 63', 90+6'; Dumornay 13', 54', 62'; Vanuxeem 85'; Étienne 90'; Mondésir 90+2'	Report

SKNFA Technical Center, Basseterre (Saint Kitts and Nevis)
Referee: Francia González (Mexico)

November 30, 2023
21:00 (19:00 UTC-6)

Costa Rica	2–1	Haiti
G. Villalobos 13'; A. Herrera 90+8'	Report	Mondésir 55'

Estadio Alejandro Morera Soto, Alajuela
Referee: Odette Hamilton (Jamaica)

December 4, 2023
19:00

Saint Kitts and Nevis	0–19	Costa Rica
	Report	Salas 2', 5' (pen.), 9', 10', 23', 45+5', 49'; A. Herrera 3', 43'; G. Villalobos 19'; F. Villalobos 25'; Scott 44'; Rodríguez 45+3'; M. Herrera 59'; Pinell 64'; Del Campo 68'; Fonseca 88', 90+1'; Valenciano 90'

SKNFA Technical Center, Basseterre
Referee: Natalie Simon (United States)

== League B ==
=== Group A ===
Pos	Team	Pld	W	D	L	GF	GA	GD	Pts	Qualification	(Guyana)	(Suriname)	(Antigua and Barbuda)	(Dominica)
1	Guyana	6	5	0	1	20	2	+18	15	Advance to play-offs	—	1–0	3–0	5–0
2	Suriname	6	4	0	2	17	2	+15	12		0–1	—	1–0	11–0
3	Antigua and Barbuda	6	1	1	4	3	8	−5	4		2–1	0–1	—	1–2
4	Dominica	6	1	1	4	2	30	−28	4		0–9	0–4	0–0	—

Source: CONCACAF
September 20, 2023
15:00
15:00 (UTC−4)

Dominica	0–4	Suriname
	Report	Stekkinger 7'; Lantveld 50'; Patra 56'; Riley 73'

Windsor Park, Roseau
Referee: Merlin Vanessa Soto (Honduras)
September 20, 2023
16:00
16:00 (UTC−4)

Antigua and Barbuda	2–1	Guyana
De Suza 13', 51'	Report	Desa 62' (pen.)

ABFA Technical Center, Piggotts
Referee: Annays Rosario (Puerto Rico)

September 24, 2023
16:00
16:00 (UTC−4)

Guyana	5–0	Dominica
Trim 5', 25'; Desa 8' (pen.); Charles 30', 64'	Report

Wildey Turf Stadium, Bridgetown (Barbados)
Referee: Neressa Goldson (Jamaica)
September 24, 2023
19:00
19:00 (UTC−3)

Suriname	1–0	Antigua and Barbuda
Lantveld 16' (pen.)	Report

Dr. Ir. Franklin Essed Stadion, Paramaribo
Referee: Sandra Benítez (El Salvador)

October 25, 2023

Suriname	0–1	Guyana
	Report	Alfred 41'

Dr. Ir. Franklin Essed Stadion, Paramaribo
Referee: Neressa Goldson (Jamaica)
October 25, 2023

Dominica	0–0	Antigua and Barbuda
	Report

Daren Sammy Cricket Ground, Gros Islet (Saint Lucia)
Referee: Shandor Wilkinson (Saint Kitts and Nevis)

October 29, 2023

Antigua and Barbuda	1–2	Dominica
Drew 4'	Report	Humphreys 19' (pen.), 82'

ABFA Technical Center, Piggotts
Referee: Janeishka Caban (Puerto Rico)
October 29, 2023

Guyana	1–0	Suriname
Charles 24'	Report

Dr. Ir. Franklin Essed Stadion, Paramaribo (Suriname)
Referee: Crystal Sobers (Trinidad and Tobago)

November 29, 2023
16:00

Antigua and Barbuda	0–1	Suriname
	Report	Patra 45+3'

ABFA Technical Center, Piggotts
Referee: Janeishka Caban (Puerto Rico)
November 29, 2023
18:00 (19:00 UTC−3)

Dominica	0–9	Guyana
	Report	Charles 4', 74', 79'; Alfred 19'; Desa 28' (pen.); Kouzas 34'; Vincent 38', 88'; Tribune 61'

Dr. Ir. Franklin Essed Stadion, Paramaribo (Suriname)
Referee: Kedeen Foster (Cayman Islands)

December 3, 2023
17:00 (18:00 UTC-3)

Guyana	3–0	Antigua and Barbuda
Vincent 39'; Charles 63'; Liverpool 85'	Report

Dr. Ir. Franklin Essed Stadion, Paramaribo (Suriname)
Referee: Neressa Goldson (Jamaica)
December 3, 2023
20:00 (21:00 UTC-3)

Suriname	11–0	Dominica
Patra 2', 46', 90+5'; George 9' (o.g.); Bhagerath 14'; Chong 16', 52'; Stekkinger 19' (pen.); Loe-A-Foe 33'; Vaissaire 45+4'; Lancaster 82' (o.g.)	Report

Dr. Ir. Franklin Essed Stadion, Paramaribo
Referee: Shandor Wilkinson (Saint Kitts and Nevis)

=== Group B ===
Pos	Team	Pld	W	D	L	GF	GA	GD	Pts	Qualification	(El Salvador)	(Martinique)	(Nicaragua)	(Honduras)
1	El Salvador	6	6	0	0	24	2	+22	18	Advance to play-offs	—	9–1	4–1	5–0
2	Martinique	6	2	1	3	7	15	−8	7		0–2	—	1–0	0–2
3	Nicaragua	6	1	2	3	5	11	−6	5		0–3	1–1	—	2–1
4	Honduras	6	1	1	4	5	13	−8	4		0–1	1–4	1–1	—

Source: CONCACAF
September 20, 2023
18:30
18:30 (UTC−4)

Martinique	0–2	Honduras
	Report	Puerto 7', 52'

Stade Pierre-Aliker, Fort-de-France
Referee: Amairany García (Mexico)
September 20, 2023
21:00
21:00 (UTC−6)

Nicaragua	0–3	El Salvador
	Report	Cerén 21' (pen.); Gutiérrez 32'; Gómez 66'

Estadio Nacional de Fútbol, Managua
Referee: Crystal Sobers (Trinidad and Tobago)

September 24, 2023
18:00
18:00 (UTC−6)

El Salvador	9–1	Martinique
Gómez 3', 21'; Cerén 16', 70'; Gutiérrez 26', 43'; Amaya 34'; Fuentes 45+1'; Sánchez 77'	Report	Carin 13'

Estadio Las Delicias, Santa Tecla
Referee: Kimberly Sánchez (Costa Rica)
September 25, 2023
20:00
20:00 (UTC−6)

Honduras	1–1	Nicaragua
B. Murillo 71'	Report	López 40'

Estadio Nacional Chelato Uclés, Tegucigalpa
Referee: Diana Pérez (Mexico)

October 25, 2023

Martinique	1–0	Nicaragua
Gaydu 43'	Report

Stade Pierre-Aliker, Fort-de-France
Referee: Natalie Simon (United States)
October 26, 2023

Honduras	0–1	El Salvador
	Report	Fuentes 57'

Estadio Nacional Chelato Uclés, Tegucigalpa
Referee: Astrid Gramajo (Guatemala)

October 29, 2023

El Salvador	5–0	Honduras
Gutiérrez 12'; Fuentes 25', 57'; Gómez 61'; López 88'	Report

Estadio Jorge "El Mágico" González, San Salvador
Referee: Alyssa Nichols (United States)
October 29, 2023

Nicaragua	1–1	Martinique
Flores 33'	Report	Salomon 44'

Estadio Nacional de Fútbol, Managua
Referee: Mayary Cartagena (Guatemala)

November 29, 2023
20:00 (18:00 UTC-6)

Nicaragua	2–1	Honduras
Aguilar 12', 51'	Report	Puerto 16'

Estadio Independencia, Estelí
Referee: Alex Billeter (United States)
November 29, 2023
20:00

Martinique	0–2	El Salvador
	Report	Sánchez 64'; Cerén 79' (pen.)

Stade Pierre-Aliker, Fort-de-France
Referee: Crystal Sobers (Trinidad and Tobago)

December 3, 2023
15:00 (13:00 UTC-6)

Honduras	1–4	Martinique
Puerto 17'	Report	Bellance-Lapointe 21'; Tarrieu 63', 85', 90+4'

Estadio Nacional Chelato Uclés, Tegucigalpa
Referee: Danielle Chesky (United States)
December 3, 2023
17:00 (15:00 UTC-6)

El Salvador	4–1	Nicaragua
Sánchez 25'; Cerén 35' (pen.); Altamirano 86' (o.g.); Velásquez 90+2'	Report	Flores 4'

Estadio Jorge "El Mágico" González, San Salvador
Referee: Karen Hernández (Mexico)

=== Group C ===
Pos	Team	Pld	W	D	L	GF	GA	GD	Pts	Qualification	(Dominican Republic)	(Bermuda)	(Barbados)	(Saint Vincent and the Grenadines)
1	Dominican Republic	6	5	0	1	24	3	+21	15	Advance to play-offs	—	2–0	3–0	4–0
2	Bermuda	6	4	1	1	14	5	+9	13		2–0	—	4–2	3–0 (Note: Saint Vincent and the Grenadines were unable to travel to Bermuda prior to their scheduled match on December 1. The matter was resolved by CONCACAF by awarding Bermuda with a 3–0 win.)
3	Barbados	6	1	1	4	11	19	−8	4		1–7	1–1	—	5–0
4	Saint Vincent and the Grenadines	6	1	0	5	4	26	−22	3		0–8	0–4	4–2	—

Source: CONCACAF
Notes:
September 22, 2023
17:00
17:00 (UTC−3)

Bermuda	2–0	Dominican Republic
Masters 10', 45+1'	Report

National Sports Centre, Devonshire Parish
Referee: Karen Hernández (Mexico)
September 22, 2023
19:00
19:00 (UTC−4)

Barbados	5–0	Saint Vincent and the Grenadines
Stevenson 11'; Cyrus 19', 22', 45+2'; Burnett-Griffith 74'	Report

Wildey Turf Stadium, Bridgetown
Referee: Alyssa Nichols (United States)

September 26, 2023
15:00
15:00 (UTC−4)

Saint Vincent and the Grenadines	0–4	Bermuda
	Report	Ratteray-Smith 14', 39'; Frazzoni 78'; Brangman 86' (pen.)

Arnos Vale Stadium, Kingstown
Referee: Priscila Pérez (Mexico)
September 26, 2023
19:00
19:00 (UTC−4)

Dominican Republic	3–0	Barbados
Torreira 39'; Reed 53'; Kara 55'	Report

Estadio Olímpico Félix Sánchez, Santo Domingo
Referee: Odette Hamilton (Jamaica)

October 27, 2023
15:00
15:00 (UTC−4)

Saint Vincent and the Grenadines	0–8	Dominican Republic
	Report	Kara 1'; Jackson 9', 40', 58'; González 17', 33'; Peralta 23' (pen.); Cabrera 87'

Arnos Vale Stadium, Kingstown
Referee: Kedeen Foster (Cayman Islands)
October 27, 2023
19:00
19:00 (UTC−4)

Barbados	1–1	Bermuda
Forde 47'	Report	Nolan 24'

Wildey Turf Stadium, Bridgetown
Referee: Saphire Stockman (Costa Rica)

October 31, 2023

Bermuda	4–2	Barbados
Masters 5'; Davis 10'; Nolan 12', 74'	Report	Thompson 34', 45+5'

Bermuda National Stadium, Hamilton
Referee: Katia Itzel García (Mexico)
October 31, 2023

Dominican Republic	4–0	Saint Vincent and the Grenadines
Jackson 2'; Marte 18'; Vallecillo 40'; Cuevas 60'	Report

Estadio Olímpico Félix Sánchez, Santo Domingo
Referee: Suleimy Linares Sáez (Cuba)

December 1, 2023
19:00

Barbados	1–7	Dominican Republic
Small 32'	Report	Asenjo 21', 33'; Marte 48', 87'; Oviedo 68'; González 77'; Peralta 81'

Wildey Turf Stadium, Bridgetown
Referee: Karitza Guerra (Honduras)
December 1, 2023
19:30 (20:30 UTC-3)

Bermuda	3–0 Awarded	Saint Vincent and the Grenadines
	Report

National Sports Centre, Devonshire Parish

December 5, 2023
16:00

Saint Vincent and the Grenadines	4–2	Barbados
Hooper 12'; Connell 82'; Thompson 84' (o.g.); Charles 89' (pen.)	Report	Stevenson 74'; Bowens 90+3' (o.g.)

Hasely Crawford Stadium, Port of Spain (Trinidad and Tobago)
Referee: Glenda López (Guatemala)
December 5, 2023
18:00

Dominican Republic	2–0	Bermuda
Oviedo 17'; Asenjo 87'	Report

Estadio Olímpico Félix Sánchez, Santo Domingo
Referee: Marie-Soleil Beaudoin (Canada)

== League C ==
=== Group A ===
Pos	Team	Pld	W	D	L	GF	GA	GD	Pts	(Belize)	(Aruba)	(Bonaire)	(Turks and Caicos Islands)
1	Belize	6	6	0	0	20	1	+19	18	—	2–0	3–0	3–0
2	Aruba	6	3	0	3	19	6	+13	9	0–1	—	5–0	8–0
3	Bonaire	6	2	1	3	6	14	−8	7	1–5	3–1	—	0–0
4	Turks and Caicos Islands	6	0	1	5	0	24	−24	1	0–6	0–5	0–2	—

Source: CONCACAF
September 21, 2023
16:00

Belize	2–0	Aruba
Bowden 65'; Eiley 90+1'	Report

FFB Stadium, Belmopan
Referee: Mayary Cartagena (Guatemala)
September 21, 2023
20:00

Bonaire	0–0	Turks and Caicos Islands
	Report

Stadion Antonio Trenidat, Rincon
Referee: Alex Billeter (United States)

September 25, 2023
16:00

Turks and Caicos Islands	0–5	Aruba
	Report	Lammers 1'; Gumbs 10', 86'; Henao 21'; Susanna 75'

TCIFA National Stadium, Providenciales
Referee: Janeishka Caban (Puerto Rico)
September 25, 2023
19:30

Belize	3–0	Bonaire
Bowden 34'; Velasquez 48', 64'	Report

FFB Stadium, Belmopan
Referee: Mirian Leon (El Salvador)

October 26, 2023
16:00

Turks and Caicos Islands	0–6	Belize
	Report	Bowden 11', 67'; Velasquez 36'; Lambey 49'; Eiley 54'; Rodríguez 77'

TCIFA National Stadium, Providenciales
Referee: Danielle Chesky (United States)
October 26, 2023

Bonaire	3–1	Aruba
Wijnschenk 36' (pen.), 42' (pen.); Rier 90+3'	Report	Susanna 11' (pen.)

Stadion Antonio Trenidat, Rincon
Referee: Isabelle Duclos (Canada)

October 30, 2023

Aruba	5–0	Bonaire
Gumbs 30'; Doornkamp 45'; Susanna 63', 90+4'; Lammers 86'	Report

Compleho Deportivo Guillermo Prospero Trinidad, Oranjestad
Referee: Myriam Marcotte (Canada)
October 30, 2023

Belize	3–0	Turks and Caicos Islands
Jones 44', 52'; Velasquez 48'	Report

FFB Stadium, Belmopan
Referee: Karitza Guerra (Honduras)

November 30, 2023
15:00

Aruba	8–0	Turks and Caicos Islands
Susanna 4', 45+3' (pen.), 71'; Lammers 27', 49', 52', 68'; Lampe 70'	Report

Compleho Deportivo Guillermo Prospero Trinidad, Oranjestad
Referee: Anya Voigt (United States)
November 30, 2023
20:00

Bonaire	1–5	Belize
Visers 28'	Report	Velasquez 18'; Eiley 41', 49'; Tillett 81', 90+3'

Stadion Antonio Trenidat, Rincon
Referee: Priscila Pérez (Mexico)

December 4, 2023
15:00

Aruba	0–1	Belize
	Report	Bowden 85'

Compleho Deportivo Guillermo Prospero Trinidad, Oranjestad
Referee: Alyssa Nichols (United States)
December 4, 2023
17:00

Turks and Caicos Islands	0–2	Bonaire
	Report	Visers 19'; van Loe 35'

TCIFA National Stadium, Providenciales
Referee: Mirian León (El Salvador)

=== Group B ===
Pos	Team	Pld	W	D	L	GF	GA	GD	Pts	(Cuba)	(Saint Lucia)	(Guadeloupe)
1	Cuba	4	4	0	0	11	2	+9	12	—	4–1	3–0
2	Saint Lucia	4	2	0	2	12	8	+4	6	1–2	—	5–1
3	Guadeloupe	4	0	0	4	2	15	−13	0	0–2	1–5	—

Source: CONCACAF
September 22, 2023
18:00

Saint Lucia	1–2	Cuba
Joseph 15'	Report	Rodríguez 4'; Mengana 90+3'

Daren Sammy Cricket Ground, Gros Islet
Referee: Shandor Wilkinson (Saint Kitts and Nevis)

September 26, 2023
15:00

Guadeloupe	1–5	Saint Lucia
Lepante 37'	Report	Louis 2', 45+2', 47', 80'; Marquis 87'

Stade municipal de Sainte-Anne, Sainte-Anne
Referee: Saphire Stockman (Costa Rica)

October 27, 2023

Guadeloupe	0–2	Cuba
	Report	Gustarimac 35' (o.g.); Pupo Álvarez 44'

Stade municipal de Sainte-Anne, Sainte-Anne
Referee: Alex Billeter (United States)

October 31, 2023

Cuba	3–0	Guadeloupe
Aldana 9', 45+2'; Núñez 37'	Report

Estadio Antonio Maceo, Santiago de Cuba
Referee: Glenda López (Guatemala)

December 1, 2023
16:00

Saint Lucia	5–1	Guadeloupe
Louis 7', 21'; St. Louis 39', 57', 90+2'	Report	Garriba 89'

Daren Sammy Cricket Ground, Gros Islet
Referee: Cecile Hinds (Trinidad and Tobago)

December 5, 2023
16:00

Cuba	4–1	Saint Lucia
Núñez 9', 14'; Espinosa 38'; Aguilar 73' (pen.)	Report	John 63'

Estadio Antonio Maceo, Santiago de Cuba
Referee: Deily Gómez (Costa Rica)

=== Group C ===
Pos	Team	Pld	W	D	L	GF	GA	GD	Pts	(Grenada)	(United States Virgin Islands)	(The Bahamas)
1	Grenada	4	4	0	0	16	2	+14	12	—	4–0	4–1
2	U.S. Virgin Islands	4	1	1	2	2	7	−5	4	0–2	—	0–0
3	Bahamas	4	0	1	3	3	12	−9	1	1–6	1–2	—

Source: CONCACAF
September 20, 2023
19:00

Bahamas	1–6	Grenada
D. McClure 44'	Report	Thompson 12', 74'; Frank 36'; Ramdhanny 79'; R. Bubb 83'; Williams 90+2'

Thomas Robinson Stadium, Nassau
Referee: Marianela Araya (Costa Rica)

September 24, 2023
16:00

Grenada	4–1	Bahamas
Thompson 11', 55', 72'; Fullerton 47'	Report	Edey 42'

Kirani James Athletic Stadium, St. George's
Referee: Kedeen Foster (Cayman Islands)

October 25, 2023

Grenada	4–0	U.S. Virgin Islands
Sylvester 5'; Thompson 15'; Ramdhanny 17'; Williams 82'	Report

Kirani James Athletic Stadium, St. George's
Referee: Cecile Hinds (Trinidad and Tobago)

October 29, 2023

U.S. Virgin Islands	0–0	Bahamas
	Report

Bethlehem Soccer Stadium, Charlotte Amalie
Referee: Carly Shaw-MacLaren (Canada)

November 29, 2023
16:00

Bahamas	1–2	U.S. Virgin Islands
Thompson 31'	Report	Taylor 16'; Canizio 34'

Roscow A. L. Davies Soccer Field, Nassau
Referee: Smeedly Saint-Jean (Haiti)

December 3, 2023
19:00

U.S. Virgin Islands	0–2	Grenada
	Report	Fullerton 65' (pen.); Frank 79'

Bethlehem Soccer Stadium, Charlotte Amalie
Referee: Dilia Bradley (Guatemala)

=== Group D ===
Pos	Team	Pld	W	D	L	GF	GA	GD	Pts	(Curaçao)	(Anguilla)	(Cayman Islands)
1	Curaçao	4	4	0	0	18	4	+14	12	—	5–2	6–1
2	Anguilla	4	1	1	2	8	13	−5	4	1–5	—	3–1
3	Cayman Islands	4	0	1	3	4	13	−9	1	0–2	2–2	—

Source: CONCACAF
September 21, 2023
16:00

Anguilla	3–1	Cayman Islands
Ca. Johnson 12', 45+2', 70'	Report	Stewart 89'

Raymond E. Guishard Stadium, The Valley
Referee: Belkis Flores (Honduras)

September 25, 2023
15:30

Cayman Islands	2–2	Anguilla
Windsor 33'; Kehoe 74'	Report	Minette 45+3'; Kei. Vanterpool 70'

Truman Bodden Stadium, George Town
Referee: Deily Gómez (Costa Rica)

October 26, 2023

Cayman Islands	0–2	Curaçao
	Report	J. Rosa 49'; S. Rosa 53'

Truman Bodden Stadium, George Town
Referee: Amairany García (Mexico)

October 30, 2023

Curaçao	5–2	Anguilla
K. Martina 5'; Hansen 12' (pen.), 62'; S. Rosa 18'; Richardson 60' (pen.)	Report	Conner 32'; Gumbs 89'

Stadion Rignaal 'Jean' Francisca, Willemstad
Referee: Tatiana Guzmán (Nicaragua)

November 30, 2023
16:00

Anguilla	1–5	Curaçao
Ca. Johnson 87'	Report	K. Martina 19', 39', 54', 83'; Hansen 45+5'

Raymond E. Guishard Stadium, The Valley
Referee: Astrid Gramajo (Guatemala)

December 4, 2023
20:00

Curaçao	6–1	Cayman Islands
J. Rosa 5'; K. Martina 19', 81'; Hansen 66'; S. Rosa 86'; Pulido 90'	Report	Brown 26'

Stadion Rignaal 'Jean' Francisca, Willemstad
Referee: Diana Pérez (Mexico)

== Play-offs ==
The three group runners-up of League A and the three group winners of League B advanced to the play-offs (also known as the prelims). The six teams were divided into three pairings based on the December 2023 CONCACAF Women's Ranking. The single-leg matches took place at Dignity Health Sports Park in Carson, California, United States on February 17, 2024, immediately prior to the 2024 CONCACAF W Gold Cup. The three winners qualified for the final tournament's group stage.

=== Teams ===
Qualified teams
Team	Qualification	CONCACAF Ranking
Haiti	Qualification League A Group C runners-up	7
El Salvador	Qualification League B Group B winners	9
Guyana	Qualification League B Group A winners	11
Dominican Republic	Qualification League B Group C winners	12
Guatemala	Qualification League A Group B runners-up	15
Puerto Rico	Qualification League A Group A runners-up	17

=== Summary ===
Team 1	Score	Team 2
Haiti	0–1	Puerto Rico
El Salvador	3–1	Guatemala
Guyana	0–1	Dominican Republic

=== Matches ===
February 17, 2024
13:00

Guyana	0–1	Dominican Republic
	Report	González 55'

Dignity Health Sports Park Track & Field Stadium, Carson
Referee: Crystal Sobers (Trinidad and Tobago)

February 17, 2024
16:00

Haiti	0–1	Puerto Rico
	Report	Aguilera 41' (pen.)

Dignity Health Sports Park Track & Field Stadium, Carson
Referee: Priscila Pérez (Mexico)

February 17, 2024
19:00

El Salvador	3–1	Guatemala
Cerén 19', 45+1', 69' (pen.)	Report	Martínez 77'

Dignity Health Sports Park Track & Field Stadium, Carson
Referee: Tatiana Guzmán (Nicaragua)

== Qualified teams ==
The following twelve teams qualified for the final tournament.

Team	Qualified as	Qualified on
United States	2022 CONCACAF W Championship winner	July 18, 2022
Canada	CONCACAF Olympic play-off winner	September 26, 2023
Mexico	Qualification League A Group A winner	December 1, 2023
Panama	Qualification League A Group B winner	December 3, 2023
Costa Rica	Qualification League A Group C winner	December 4, 2023
Puerto Rico	Qualification play-off winner	February 17, 2024
El Salvador	Qualification play-off winner	February 17, 2024
Dominican Republic	Qualification play-off winner	February 17, 2024
Brazil	2022 Copa América Femenina winners	January 27, 2023 (Note: While the semi-finalists of the 2022 Copa América Femenina were confirmed on July 18 (Brazil), July 20 (Colombia and Paraguay) and July 21, 2022 (Argentina), their invitation to participate in the W Gold Cup was not confirmed until January 27, 2023.)
Colombia	2022 Copa América Femenina runners-up	January 27, 2023
Argentina	2022 Copa América Femenina third place	January 27, 2023
Paraguay	2022 Copa América Femenina fourth place	January 27, 2023

== Goalscorers ==
There were 353 goals scored in 86 matches, for an average of 4.1 goals per match.

8 goals

- (Haiti) Melchie Dumornay
- (El Salvador) Brenda Cerén

7 goals

- (Aruba) Vanessa Susanna
- (Costa Rica) María Paula Salas
- (Curaçao) Kadisha Martina
- (Guyana) Otesha Charles

6 goals

- (Aruba) Bonny Lammers
- (Grenada) Nia Thompson
- (Haiti) Nérilia Mondésir
- (Saint Lucia) Arnicka Louis

5 goals

- (Belize) Mikhaila Bowden
- (Belize) Khalydia Velasquez
- (Haiti) Batcheba Louis
- (Suriname) Katoucha Patra

4 goals

- (Anguilla) Carlia Johnson
- (Belize) Sabrina Eiley
- (Costa Rica) Melissa Herrera
- (Curaçao) Taïsha Hansen
- (Dominican Republic) Kat González
- (Dominican Republic) Jazmin Jackson
- (El Salvador) Danielle Fuentes
- (El Salvador) Samaria Gómez
- (El Salvador) Danya Gutiérrez
- (Guatemala) Ana Lucía Martínez
- (Honduras) Lesbia Puerto

3 goals

- (Aruba) Aisse Gumbs
- (Barbados) Rianna Cyrus
- (Bermuda) Jaden Masters
- (Bermuda) Aaliyah Nolan
- (Costa Rica) Priscila Chinchilla
- (Costa Rica) Alexa Herrera
- (Costa Rica) Raquel Rodríguez
- (Costa Rica) Gloriana Villalobos
- (Cuba) Eunises Núñez
- (Curaçao) Sadéyah Rosa
- (Dominican Republic) Mía Asenjo
- (Dominican Republic) Lucía Marte León
- (El Salvador) Victoria Sánchez
- (Guyana) Brianne Desa
- (Guyana) Annalisa Vincent
- (Haiti) Kethna Louis
- (Martinique) Mylaine Tarrieu
- (Saint Lucia) Krysan St. Louis

2 goals

- (Antigua and Barbuda) Gabrielle De Suza
- (Barbados) Shanice Stevenson
- (Barbados) Ashanee Thompson
- (Belize) Kaite Jones
- (Belize) Carlene Tillett
- (Bermuda) Jya Ratteray-Smith
- (Bonaire) Vurgy-Ann Visers
- (Bonaire) Bibi Wijnschenk
- (Costa Rica) Tanisha Fonseca
- (Costa Rica) Alexandra Pinell
- (Cuba) Cecil Aldana
- (Curaçao) Jeleaugh Rosa
- (Dominica) Starr Humphreys
- (Dominican Republic) Vanessa Kara
- (Dominican Republic) Alyssa Oviedo
- (Dominican Republic) Winibian Peralta
- (Grenada) Roneisha Frank
- (Grenada) Melania Fullerton
- (Grenada) Malia Ramdhanny
- (Grenada) Abigail Williams
- (Guyana) Shanice Alfred
- (Guyana) Jalade Trim
- (Mexico) Alicia Cervantes
- (Mexico) Kiana Palacios
- (Mexico) María Sánchez
- (Nicaragua) Doriana Aguilar
- (Nicaragua) Yessenia Flores
- (Panama) Marta Cox
- (Panama) Riley Tanner
- (Puerto Rico) Jill Aguilera
- (Suriname) Cady Chin See Chong
- (Suriname) Andaya Lantveld
- (Suriname) Shamaira Stekkinger

1 goal

- (Anguilla) Adriana Connor
- (Anguilla) Camile Gumbs
- (Anguilla) Maiesha Minette
- (Anguilla) Keiana Vanterpool
- (Antigua and Barbuda) Nicelle Drew
- (Aruba) Tarianna Doornkamp
- (Aruba) Jennifer Henao
- (Aruba) Stacey Lampe
- (The Bahamas) Janeka Edey
- (The Bahamas) Demitra McClure
- (The Bahamas) Kenyonique Thompson
- (Barbados) Cheyanna Burnett-Griffith
- (Barbados) Adrienne Forde
- (Barbados) Acacia Small
- (Belize) Shamika Lambey
- (Belize) Ashley Rodríguez
- (Bermuda) Khyla Brangman
- (Bermuda) Victoria Davis
- (Bermuda) Eva Frazzoni
- (Bonaire) Nyjhean-Anne Rier
- (Bonaire) Celine van Loe
- (Cayman Islands) Chelsea Brown
- (Cayman Islands) Molly Kehoe
- (Cayman Islands) Stoyanna Stewart
- (Cayman Islands) Shayana Windsor
- (Costa Rica) Valeria del Campo
- (Costa Rica) María Paula Elizondo
- (Costa Rica) Sheika Scott
- (Costa Rica) Emilie Valenciano
- (Costa Rica) Fabiola Villalobos
- (Cuba) Nahomi Aguilar
- (Cuba) Elisabet Espinosa
- (Cuba) Maristania Mengana
- (Cuba) Jessica Pupo Álvarez
- (Cuba) Katheryn Rodríguez
- (Curaçao) Emily Pulido
- (Curaçao) Lauryn Richardson
- (Dominican Republic) Dahien Cabrera
- (Dominican Republic) Gabriella Cuevas
- (Dominican Republic) Brianne Reed
- (Dominican Republic) María Torreira
- (Dominican Republic) Jaylen Vallecillo
- (El Salvador) Andrea Amaya
- (El Salvador) Yoselyn López
- (El Salvador) Jackeline Velásquez
- (Grenada) Ronniellia Bubb
- (Grenada) Erin Sylvester
- (Guadeloupe) Sydjalhia Garriba
- (Guadeloupe) Jalna Lepante
- (Guatemala) María Monterroso
- (Guatemala) Leslie Ramírez
- (Guatemala) Aisha Solórzano
- (Guyana) Stefanie Kouzas
- (Guyana) Neema Liverpool
- (Guyana) Anya Tribune
- (Haiti) Roselord Borgella
- (Haiti) Danielle Étienne
- (Haiti) Darlina Joseph
- (Haiti) Joséphine Vanuxeem
- (Honduras) Bárbara Murillo
- (Jamaica) Shaneil Buckley
- (Jamaica) Melissa Johnson
- (Jamaica) Davia Richards
- (Jamaica) Zoe Vidaurre
- (Jamaica) Ricshya Walker
- (Martinique) Naomie Bellance-Lapointe
- (Martinique) Prisca Carin
- (Martinique) Ludmila Gaydu
- (Martinique) Maeva Salomon
- (Mexico) Scarlett Camberos
- (Mexico) Charlyn Corral
- (Mexico) Alexia Delgado
- (Mexico) Greta Espinoza
- (Mexico) Cristina Ferral
- (Mexico) Natalia Mauleón
- (Nicaragua) Diana López
- (Panama) Katherine Castillo
- (Panama) Lineth Cedeño
- (Panama) Carmen Montenegro
- (Puerto Rico) Skylynn Rodríguez
- (Saint Lucia) Racquel John
- (Saint Lucia) Freegeanne Joseph
- (Saint Lucia) Ellaisa Marquis
- (Saint Vincent and the Grenadines) Asanteni Charles
- (Saint Vincent and the Grenadines) Samayaa Connell
- (Saint Vincent and the Grenadines) Areka Hooper
- (Suriname) Anne Bhagerath
- (Suriname) Samanie Loe-A-Foe
- (Suriname) Orthea Riley
- (Suriname) Griffith Vaissaire
- (Trinidad and Tobago) Alexcia Alí
- (United States Virgin Islands) Bianca Canizio
- (United States Virgin Islands) Mackiesh Taylor

1 own goal

- (Barbados) Ashanee Thompson (against Saint Vincent and the Grenadines)
- (Dominica) Alianne George (against Suriname)
- (Dominica) Selena Lancaster (against Suriname)
- (Guadeloupe) Sarane Gustarimac (against Cuba)
- (Jamaica) Alika Keene (against Panama)
- (Mexico) Kimberly Rodríguez (against Puerto Rico)
- (Nicaragua) Vanessa Altamirano (against El Salvador)
- (Saint Vincent and the Grenadines) Kelisha Bowens (against Barbados)
