= List of women's national association football teams =

This is a complete list of national teams in women's association football, arranged alphabetically within their confederations.

== Members of FIFA affiliated-confederations ==
Map of the World with the six confederations: Asian Football Confederation (AFC) Confederation of African Football (CAF) Confederation of North, Central America and Caribbean Association Football (CONCACAF) South American Football Confederation (CONMEBOL) Oceania Football Confederation (OFC) Union of European Football Associations (UEFA)

This section lists the current:

- 211 women's national football teams affiliated to FIFA, through their national football associations.
- 11 women's national football teams who have membership in one of FIFA's affiliated continental confederations, but are not members of FIFA.

FIFA members are eligible to enter the FIFA Women's World Cup and matches between them are recognized as official international matches. Based on their match results over the previous four-year period, the FIFA Women's World Rankings, published monthly by FIFA, compare the relative strengths of the national teams.

Some national teams that are members of a confederation but not FIFA members compete in confederation-level and subregional tournaments. These teams, however, are not allowed to participate in the World Cup.

The six confederations are:

- Asia – Asian Football Confederation (AFC) (Note: Additionally, 22 nations in Africa and Asia belong to the Union of Arab Football Associations (UAFA) in addition to their respective regional confederations.)
- Africa – Confederation of African Football (CAF)
- North and Central America and the Caribbean – Confederation of North, Central America and Caribbean Association Football (CONCACAF)
- South America – South American Football Confederation (CONMEBOL)
- Oceania – Oceania Football Confederation (OFC)
- Europe – Union of European Football Associations (UEFA)

FIFA runs the Women's World Cup as a tournament for national teams to find the world champion. Each confederation also runs its own championship to find the best team from among its members:

- AFC – AFC Women's Asian Cup
- CAF – Women's Africa Cup of Nations
- CONCACAF – CONCACAF W Championship
- CONMEBOL – Copa América Femenina
- OFC – OFC Women's Nations Cup
- UEFA – UEFA European Women's Championship

=== AFC (Asia) ===
Due to the geographical size of Asia, the AFC is subdivided into five sub-federations:

- West Asian Football Federation (WAFF) – represents countries at the western extremity of the continent, except Israel.
- East Asian Football Federation (EAFF) – represents nations in East Asia, plus Guam and the Northern Mariana Islands.
- Central Asian Football Association (CAFA) – represents countries in Central Asia, comprising Afghanistan, Iran, Russia and most of Soviet Central Asia, except Kazakhstan.
- South Asian Football Federation (SAFF) – represents countries in South Asia.
- ASEAN Football Federation (AFF) – represents countries in Southeast Asia, plus Australia.

- Australia^{1}
- Bahrain^{2}
- Bangladesh
- Bhutan
- Cambodia
- China PR^{3}
- Chinese Taipei^{4}
- Guam
- Hong Kong
- India
- Indonesia
- Iraq^{2}
- IR Iran^{5}
- Japan
- Jordan^{2}
- Korea DPR^{6}
- Korea Republic^{7}
- Kuwait^{2}
- Kyrgyz Republic^{8}
- Laos
- Lebanon^{2}
- Macau
- Malaysia
- Maldives
- Mongolia
- Myanmar
- Nepal
- Northern Mariana Islands^{9,10}
- Pakistan
- Palestine^{2,11}
- Philippines
- Qatar^{2}
- Saudi Arabia^{2}
- Singapore
- Sri Lanka
- Syria^{2}
- Tajikistan
- Thailand
- Timor-Leste
- Turkmenistan
- United Arab Emirates^{2}
- Uzbekistan
- Vietnam

- Brunei Darussalam, Oman and Yemen have no national women's teams.
- Afghanistan, also an AFC and FIFA member, had a national team until 2021; former Afghan women's team members based in Australia are currently applying to FIFA for recognition.

1. National governing body was formerly a member of OFC (1966–2006)
2. National governing body is a member of UAFA
3. Official name used by FIFA and AFC for People's Republic of China
4. Official name used by FIFA and AFC for Republic of China (Taiwan); national governing body was a member of OFC from 1975 to 1989
5. Official name used by FIFA and AFC for Islamic Republic of Iran
6. Official name used by FIFA for Democratic People's Republic of Korea; official name used by AFC is DPR Korea
7. Official name used by FIFA and AFC for Republic of Korea
8. Official name used by FIFA and AFC for Kyrgyzstan
9. National governing body is a full member of AFC but not a FIFA member
10. National governing body was formerly a member of OFC (2005–2009)
11. Official name used by FIFA and AFC for national team representing the Palestinian Territories

=== CAF (Africa) ===
Due to the geographical size of Africa, CAF is divided into five regional federations:

- Council for East and Central Africa Football Associations (CECAFA) – represents nations generally regarded as forming the regions of East Africa and some nations of Central Africa.
- Council of Southern Africa Football Associations (COSAFA) – represents nations generally regarded as forming Southern Africa, as well as island states off the coast of Southern Africa.
- West African Football Union/Union du Football de l'Ouest Afrique (WAFU/UFOA) – represents nations in West Africa.
- Union of North African Federations (UNAF) – represents nations regarded as forming North Africa.
- Union des Fédérations du Football de l'Afrique Centrale (UNIFFAC) – represents some of the nations that form Central Africa.

- Algeria^{1}
- Angola
- Benin
- Botswana
- Burkina Faso
- Burundi
- Cameroon
- Cape Verde
- Central African Republic
- Chad
- Comoros^{1}
- Congo
- Congo DR^{2}
- Côte d'Ivoire
- Djibouti^{1}
- Egypt^{1}
- Equatorial Guinea
- Eritrea
- Eswatini
- Ethiopia
- Gabon
- Gambia
- Ghana
- Guinea-Bissau
- Guinea
- Kenya
- Lesotho
- Liberia
- Libya^{1}
- Madagascar
- Malawi
- Mali
- Mauritania^{1}
- Mauritius
- Morocco^{1}
- Mozambique
- Namibia
- Nigeria
- Niger
- Réunion^{3}
- Rwanda
- São Tomé and Príncipe
- Senegal
- Seychelles
- Sierra Leone
- Somalia^{1}
- South Africa
- South Sudan
- Sudan^{1}
- Tanzania
- Togo
- Tunisia^{1}
- Uganda
- Zambia
- Zanzibar^{3,4,5}
- Zimbabwe

1. National governing body is a member of UAFA
2. Official name used by FIFA for Democratic Republic of the Congo; official name used by CAF is DR Congo
3. National governing body is an associate member of CAF but not a FIFA member
4. National governing body was a full member of CAF briefly during 2017
5. National governing body is a member of ConIFA. Was previously a member of the N.F.-Board.

=== CONCACAF (North, Central America, and the Caribbean) ===
The CONCACAF federation is divided into three regional federations that have responsibility for part of the region's geographical area:

- Caribbean Football Union (CFU) – represents all 27 nations in the Caribbean, plus Bermuda and three nations in South America. (Note: Guyana and Suriname are independent countries, and French Guiana is an overseas department and region of France)
- North American Football Union (NAFU) – represents the three countries in North America (not including Central America).
- Union Centroamericana de Fútbol (UNCAF) – represents the seven countries in Central America.

- Anguilla
- Antigua and Barbuda
- Aruba
- Bahamas
- Barbados
- Belize
- Bermuda
- Bonaire^{1}
- British Virgin Islands
- Canada
- Cayman Islands
- Costa Rica
- Cuba
- Curaçao
- Dominica
- Dominican Republic
- El Salvador
- Grenada
- Guadeloupe^{1}
- Guatemala
- Guyana
- Haiti
- Honduras
- Jamaica
- Martinique^{1}
- Mexico
- Nicaragua
- Panama
- Puerto Rico
- Saint Kitts and Nevis
- Saint Lucia
- Saint Vincent and the Grenadines
- Sint Maarten^{1}
- Suriname
- Trinidad and Tobago
- Turks and Caicos Islands
- United States
- United States Virgin Islands

- Montserrat has no national women's team.
- French Guiana^{1} and Saint Martin^{1}, both CONCACAF members but not FIFA members, have no national women's team.

1. National governing body is a full member of CONCACAF but not a FIFA member

=== CONMEBOL (South America) ===
- Argentina
- Bolivia
- Brazil
- Chile
- Colombia
- Ecuador
- Paraguay
- Peru
- Uruguay
- Venezuela

=== OFC (Oceania) ===
- American Samoa
- Aotearoa New Zealand^{1,2}
- Cook Islands
- Fiji
- Kiribati^{3,4}
- New Caledonia
- Papua New Guinea
- Samoa
- Solomon Islands
- Tahiti
- Tonga
- Vanuatu

- Tuvalu^{3,4}, an OFC associate member, has no national women's team.

1. Official name used by FIFA for New Zealand; official name used by OFC is New Zealand
2. National governing body was formerly a member of AFC (1964–1966)
3. National governing body is an associate member of the OFC but not a FIFA member
4. National governing body was a member of ConIFA

=== UEFA (Europe) ===
- Albania
- Andorra
- Armenia
- Austria
- Azerbaijan
- Belarus
- Belgium
- Bosnia and Herzegovina
- Bulgaria
- Croatia
- Cyprus
- Czech Republic
- Denmark
- England
- Estonia
- Faroe Islands
- Finland
- France
- Georgia
- Germany
- Gibraltar
- Greece
- Hungary
- Iceland
- Israel^{1}
- Italy
- Kazakhstan^{2}
- Kosovo
- Latvia
- Liechtenstein
- Lithuania
- Luxembourg
- Malta
- Moldova
- Montenegro
- Netherlands
- Northern Ireland
- North Macedonia
- Norway
- Poland
- Portugal
- Republic of Ireland
- Romania
- Russia^{3}
- San Marino
- Scotland
- Serbia
- Slovakia
- Slovenia
- Spain
- Sweden
- Switzerland
- Türkiye
- Ukraine
- Wales

1. National governing body was formerly a member of AFC (1954–1974); joined UEFA in 1994
2. National governing body was formerly a member of AFC (1993–2002)
3. Team currently suspended from participation in FIFA and UEFA competitions in response to Russia's 2022 invasion of Ukraine

== See also ==
- Category:National and official selection-teams not affiliated to FIFA
- International competitions in women's association football
- List of men's national association football teams
- Geography of women's association football
- List of women's association football clubs
- List of association football competitions
- Women's association football
