= Batcheba Louis =

Haitian footballer (born 1997)

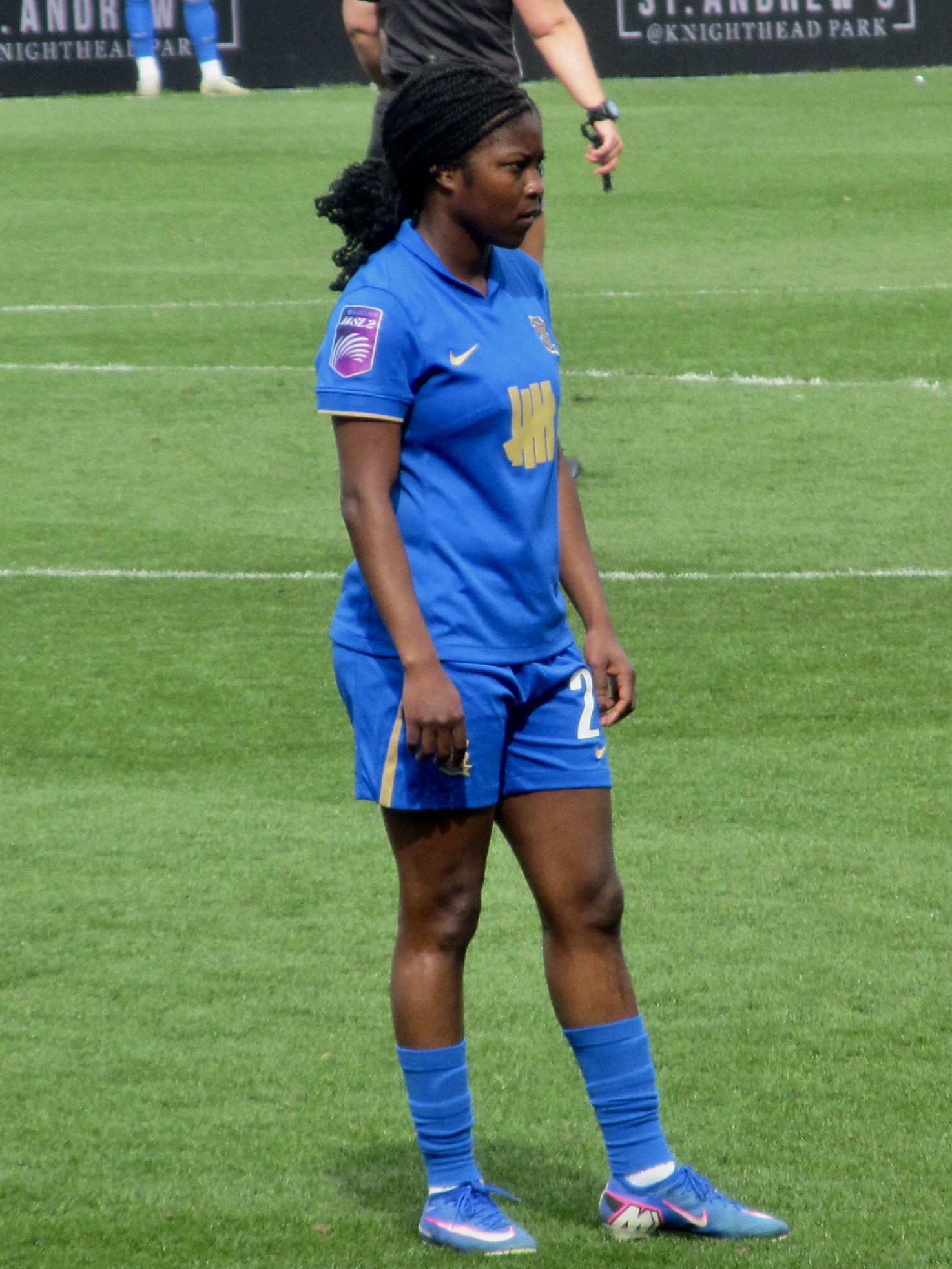
- Batcheba Louis during the 2025–26 season

Personal information
- Date of birth: 15 June 1997 (age 29)
- Place of birth: Quartier-Morin, Haiti
- Height: 1.65 m (5 ft 5 in)
- Position: Forward

Team information
- Current team: Birmingham City
- Number: 29

Senior career*
Years	Team	Apps	(Gls)
2018–2022	Issy	72	(30)
2022–2025	Fleury	65	(21)
2025–2026	Birmingham City	19	(4)
2026–	Fleury	0	(0)

International career^{‡}
2014–	Haiti	16	(26)
- * Club domestic league appearances and goals as of 18:31, 2 May 2026 (UTC) ‡ National team caps and goals as of 30 July 2023

Batcheba Louis (born 15 June 1997) is a Haitian professional footballer who plays as a forward for Fleury and the Haiti national team.

== Career ==
On 26 August 2025, Louis was announced at Birmingham City.

On 2 September 2026, Louis was announced at FC Fleury 91.

== International career ==
On 29 June 2022, Louis was called up to the Haiti squad for the 2022 CONCACAF W Championship.

On 11 July 2023, Louis was called up to the Haiti squad for the 2023 FIFA Women's World Cup.

== International goals ==
List of international goals scored by Batcheba Louis
No.	Date	Venue	Opponent	Score	Result	Competition
1	21 August 2015	Juan Ramón Loubriel Stadium, Bayamón, Puerto Rico	Aruba	1–0	14–0	2016 CONCACAF Women's Olympic Qualifying Championship qualification
2	21 August 2015	Juan Ramón Loubriel Stadium, Bayamón, Puerto Rico	Aruba	4–0	14–0	2016 CONCACAF Women's Olympic Qualifying Championship qualification
3	21 August 2015	Juan Ramón Loubriel Stadium, Bayamón, Puerto Rico	Aruba	11–0	14–0	2016 CONCACAF Women's Olympic Qualifying Championship qualification
4	21 August 2015	Juan Ramón Loubriel Stadium, Bayamón, Puerto Rico	Aruba	12–0	14–0	2016 CONCACAF Women's Olympic Qualifying Championship qualification
5	21 August 2015	Juan Ramón Loubriel Stadium, Bayamón, Puerto Rico	Aruba	13–0	14–0	2016 CONCACAF Women's Olympic Qualifying Championship qualification
6	23 August 2015	Juan Ramón Loubriel Stadium, Bayamón, Puerto Rico	Grenada	1–0	13–0	2016 CONCACAF Women's Olympic Qualifying Championship qualification
7	23 August 2015	Juan Ramón Loubriel Stadium, Bayamón, Puerto Rico	Grenada	9–0	13–0	2016 CONCACAF Women's Olympic Qualifying Championship qualification
8	23 August 2015	Juan Ramón Loubriel Stadium, Bayamón, Puerto Rico	Grenada	13–0	13–0	2016 CONCACAF Women's Olympic Qualifying Championship qualification
9	18 April 2018	Stade Sylvio Cator, Port-au-Prince, Haiti	U.S. Virgin Islands	3–0	7–0	2018 CFU Women's Challenge Series
10	18 April 2018	Stade Sylvio Cator, Port-au-Prince, Haiti	U.S. Virgin Islands	5–0	7–0	2018 CFU Women's Challenge Series
11	20 April 2018	Stade Sylvio Cator, Port-au-Prince, Haiti	U.S. Virgin Islands	5–0	14–0	2018 CFU Women's Challenge Series
12	20 April 2018	Stade Sylvio Cator, Port-au-Prince, Haiti	U.S. Virgin Islands	8–0	14–0	2018 CFU Women's Challenge Series
13	20 April 2018	Stade Sylvio Cator, Port-au-Prince, Haiti	U.S. Virgin Islands	11–0	14–0	2018 CFU Women's Challenge Series
14	20 April 2018	Stade Sylvio Cator, Port-au-Prince, Haiti	U.S. Virgin Islands	12–0	14–0	2018 CFU Women's Challenge Series
15	20 April 2018	Stade Sylvio Cator, Port-au-Prince, Haiti	U.S. Virgin Islands	13–0	14–0	2018 CFU Women's Challenge Series
16	9 May 2018	Stade Sylvio Cator, Port-au-Prince, Haiti	Martinique	2–0	2–0	2018 CONCACAF Women's Championship qualification
17	11 May 2018	Stade Sylvio Cator, Port-au-Prince, Haiti	Guadeloupe	6–0	11–0	2018 CONCACAF Women's Championship qualification
18	3 October 2019	Juan Ramón Loubriel Stadium, Bayamón, Puerto Rico	Suriname	2–0	10–0	2020 CONCACAF Women's Olympic Qualifying Championship qualification
19	3 October 2019	Juan Ramón Loubriel Stadium, Bayamón, Puerto Rico	Suriname	3–0	10–0	2020 CONCACAF Women's Olympic Qualifying Championship qualification
20	3 October 2019	Juan Ramón Loubriel Stadium, Bayamón, Puerto Rico	Suriname	5–0	10–0	2020 CONCACAF Women's Olympic Qualifying Championship qualification
21	3 February 2020	BBVA Stadium, Houston, United States	Panama	5–0	6–0	2020 CONCACAF Women's Olympic Qualifying Championship
22	30 October 2023	SKNFA Technical Center, Basseterre, Saint Kitts and Nevis	Saint Kitts and Nevis	2–0	13–0	2024 CONCACAF W Gold Cup qualification
23	30 October 2023	SKNFA Technical Center, Basseterre, Saint Kitts and Nevis	Saint Kitts and Nevis	5–0	13–0	2024 CONCACAF W Gold Cup qualification
24	30 October 2023	SKNFA Technical Center, Basseterre, Saint Kitts and Nevis	Saint Kitts and Nevis	6–0	13–0	2024 CONCACAF W Gold Cup qualification
25	30 October 2023	SKNFA Technical Center, Basseterre, Saint Kitts and Nevis	Saint Kitts and Nevis	9–0	13–0	2024 CONCACAF W Gold Cup qualification
26	30 October 2023	SKNFA Technical Center, Basseterre, Saint Kitts and Nevis	Saint Kitts and Nevis	13–0	13–0	2024 CONCACAF W Gold Cup qualification
27	23 October 2024	Emirhan Sports Complex, Antalya, Turkey	Jordan	3–1	4–2	Friendly
28	26 October 2024	Emirhan Sports Complex, Antalya, Turkey	Chinese Taipei	3–2	3–2	Friendly
29	29 October 2024	Emirhan Sports Complex, Antalya, Turkey	Russia	1–1	1–2	Friendly
30	31 May 2025	Princess Auto Stadium, Winnipeg, Canada	Canada	1–3	1–4	Friendly
31	30 November 2025	FFB Stadium, Belmopan, Belize	Belize	2–0	9–0	2026 CONCACAF W Championship qualification
32	30 November 2025	FFB Stadium, Belmopan, Belize	Belize	6–0	9–0	2026 CONCACAF W Championship qualification
33	9 October 2026	Stade Bauer, Saint-Ouen-sur-Seine, France	Japan	1–3	1–5	Friendly

== Honours ==
Birmingham City

- Women's Super League 2: 2025–26
