= Bonaire women's national football team =

Women's national association football team representing Bonaire

Bonaire
- Association: Federashon Futbòl Boneriano
- Confederation: CONCACAF (North America)
- Sub-confederation: CFU (Caribbean)
- Top scorer: Vurgy-Ann Visers; Bibi Wijnschenk (2 goals each)
- Home stadium: Stadion Antonio Trenidat
- FIFA code: BES; BOE (CONCACAF Code)

First international
- Bonaire 0–0 Turks and Caicos Islands (Rincon, Bonaire; 21 September 2023)

Biggest win
- Bonaire 3–1 Aruba (Rincon, Bonaire; 26 October 2023); Turks and Caicos Islands 0–2 Bonaire (Providenciales, Turks and Caicos Islands; 4 December 2023)

Biggest defeat
- Aruba 5–0 Bonaire (Oranjestad, Aruba; 30 October 2023)

The Bonaire women's national football team (Dutch: Bonairiaans vrouwenvoetbalelftal; Papiamento: selekshon feminino di futbòl Boneiru) is the national women's football team of Bonaire and is overseen by the Bonaire Football Federation.

== History ==
Bonaire's women's national team played 6 unofficial matches against club sides in the 2015 and 2017 Dutch Caribbean Women's Soccer Cups where they defeated Sint Maarten side Oualichi in both editions. Their first official, international match came on 21 September 2023 in a 2024 CONCACAF W Gold Cup qualification match against the Turks and Caicos Islands. Bonaire, along with Cuba and Saint Lucia, were announced as late entrants in May 2023 and were placed into League C to preserve the integrity of the originally-announced leagues.

== Results and fixtures ==
The following is a list of match results in the last 12 months, as well as any future matches that have been scheduled.

Legend

Win Draw Lose Fixture

== Coaching staff ==
=== Current staff ===
Position	Staff
Head coach	(Bonaire) Terence Da Costa
Assistant coach	
Assistant coach	
Goalkeeper coach	
Performance analyst	

== Players ==
=== Current squad ===
- The following players were named to the squad to play the 2024 CONCACAF W Gold Cup qualification games against Belize and Turks and Caicos Islands on 30 November and 4 December 2023, respectively.

Pos.	Player	Date of birth (age)	Caps	Goals	Club	Latest call-up
	GK	Rose-Shantely Engelhart				
	GK	Yvonne Trenidad				
	DF	Celine van Loe				
	DF	Frena Weibel				
	DF	Swenthley Mercera				
	DF	Roqienne Domacassé				
	DF	Michenou Marselia				
	DF	Carlin Ten Hoeve				
	DF	Jaydi Susana				
	MF	Sarah Rutters				
	MF	Hilda Looijs				
	MF	Samanta Molina				
	MF	Nathaniela Emerenciana				
	MF	Vurgy-Ann Visers				
	MF	Xaquenne Saragoza				
	MF	Nyjhean-Anne Rier				
	FW	Bibi Wijnschenk				
	FW	Lygaira Pieters				
	FW	Jeanelle Thode				
	FW	Genisha Piar-Cornelia				

=== Recent call-ups ===
The following players have also been called up to the Bonaire squad within the last 12 months.

Pos.	Player	Date of birth (age)	Caps	Goals	Club	Latest call-up

== Competitive record ==
=== CONCACAF W Gold Cup ===
CONCACAF W Gold Cup record								Qualification record							
Year	Result	GP	W	D*	L	GF	GA	Division	Group	GP	W	D*	L	GF	GA
(United States) 2024	Did not qualify							C	A	6	2	1	3	6	14
(N/A) 2029	To be determined							To be determined							
Total	–	–	–	–	–	–	–	–	–	6	2	1	3	6	14

*Draws include knockout matches decided on penalty kicks.
