= Emily Maver =

Guadeloupean footballer (born 1993)

Personal information
- Full name: Emily Yvette Maver
- Place of birth: Guadeloupe
- Position: Midfielder

Senior career*
Years	Team	Apps	(Gls)
- CS Grevenmacher

International career
- Guadeloupe
- * Club domestic league appearances and goals

Emily Yvette Maver (born January 13, 1993) is a Guadeloupean footballer who plays as a winger or striker for the Guadeloupe women's national football team.

== Early life ==
A native of Petit-Bourg, Guadeloupe, Maver started playing football at the age of five. She studied in the United States and Canada.

== Career ==
Maver mainly operates as a winger or striker and is known for her speed. She is the first and as of 2023 the only Guadeloupean female professional footballer.
