= Cecil Aldana =

Cuban footballer (born 2003)

Personal information
- Full name: Cecil De La Caridad Aldana Tamayo
- Date of birth: 17 September 2003 (age 23)
- Place of birth: Cuba
- Height: 1.70 m (5 ft 7 in)
- Position: Forward

Team information
- Current team: Universidad de Chile

Senior career*
Years	Team	Apps	(Gls)
2022	Granma	8	(14)
2023–2025	LDU Quito	60	(58)
2025	Dragonas IDV	–	(–)
2026	Universidad de Chile	3	(0)

International career
2024	Cuba	7	(3)
- * Club domestic league appearances and goals as of 8 July 2026

Cecil De La Caridad Aldana Tamayo (born 17 September 2003) is a Cuban footballer who plays as a forward.

== Life and career ==
Aldana was born on 17 September 2003 in Cuba. She started playing football at the age of seven. She played football in the streets with her cousins and friends as a child. She attended the School of Initiation of Sports in Schools in Cuba. She is a native of Bayamo, Cuba. She started her career with Cuban side Granma. She was the top scorer of the 2022 Cuban women's league with fourteen goals. In 2023, she signed for Ecuadorian side Liga de Quito.

On 20 March 2026, Aldana signed with Universidad de Chile from Ecuadorian club Dragonas IDV. She left them on 7 July of the same year.

== International career ==
Aldana is a Cuba international. She has played for the Cuba women's national under-17 football team, Cuba women's national under-20 football team, and Cuba women's national football team. She was described as "played for the Cuban national team since she was very young, highlighting her talent in categories higher than those corresponding to her age".

== International goals ==
No.	Date	Venue	Opponent	Score	Result	Competition
1.	31 October 2023	Estadio Antonio Maceo, Santiago de Cuba, Cuba	Guadeloupe	1–0	3–0	2024 CONCACAF W Gold Cup qualification
2.	31 October 2023	Estadio Antonio Maceo, Santiago de Cuba, Cuba	Guadeloupe	3–0	3–0	2024 CONCACAF W Gold Cup qualification
3.	2 December 2025	Estadio Antonio Maceo, Santiago de Cuba, Cuba	Saint Kitts and Nevis	1–1	2–2	2026 CONCACAF W Championship qualification
4.	2 December 2025	Estadio Antonio Maceo, Santiago de Cuba, Cuba	Saint Kitts and Nevis	2–1	2–2	2026 CONCACAF W Championship qualification

== Style of play ==
Aldana mainly operates as a forward. She has been described as a "forward with great technical skill... no trouble getting down to three-quarters of the pitch to ask for the ball and then reach the opponent's goal... strong and her opponents have a hard time stopping her. A good finish is one of her attributes".
