= María Paula Elizondo =

Costa Rican footballer (born 1998)

Personal information
- Full name: María Paula Elizondo Herrera
- Date of birth: 30 November 1998 (age 27)
- Place of birth: Turrialba, Costa Rica
- Height: 1.56 m (5 ft 1 in)
- Position: Defender

Team information
- Current team: Saprissa

Youth career
- Municipal Turrialba

Senior career*
Years	Team	Apps	(Gls)
- Saprissa

International career^{‡}
2014	Costa Rica U17	3	(0)
2018	Costa Rica U20	3	(0)
2016–	Costa Rica	4	(0)
Medal record
Women's football
Representing Costa Rica
Pan American Games
Bronze medal – third place	2019 Lima	Team
- * Club domestic league appearances and goals ‡ National team caps and goals as of 28 July 2019

María Paula Elizondo Herrera (born 30 November 1998) is a Costa Rican footballer who plays as a defender for Deportivo Saprissa and the Costa Rica women's national team.

== International goals ==
No.	Date	Venue	Opponent	Score	Result	Competition
1.	25 September 2023	Estadio Alejandro Morera Soto, Alajuela, Costa Rica	Saint Kitts and Nevis	1–0	11–0	2024 CONCACAF W Gold Cup qualification
