= Cheyanna Burnett-Griffith =

Barbadian footballer

Cheyanna Burnett-Griffith is a Barbadian footballer who plays as a striker for MK Dons Women.

== Early life and education ==
Burnett-Griffith grew up playing competitive badminton as well as football. She attended Southwest Virginia Community College on a football scholarship.

== Club career ==
Burnett-Griffith played for Barbadian side Mavericks, including in tournaments in Canada and the United States.

== International career ==
In 2022, Burnett-Griffith scored her first goal for the Barbados women's national football team during a 3–1 win over the Aruba women's national football team.

== Style of play ==
Burnett-Griffith mainly operates as a striker and has been described as having "an eye for goal and she likes to shoot as well".

== Personal life ==
Burnett-Griffith has regarded her grandmother as her inspiration.
