= Aruba women's national football team =

Women's national association football team representing Aruba

Aruba
- Association: Arubaanse Voetbal Bond
- Confederation: CONCACAF
- Sub-confederation: CFU (Caribbean)
- Head coach: Arjan van der Laan
- Top scorer: Vanessa Susanna (6)
- Home stadium: Trinidad Stadium
- FIFA code: ARU
First colours	Second colours

FIFA ranking
- Current: 183 (16 June 2026)
- Highest: 123 (June 2014)
- Lowest: 186 (December 2024 – December 2025)

First international
- Aruba 1–2 Netherlands Antilles (Oranjestad, Aruba; 5 May 2006)

Biggest win
- Aruba 8–0 Turks and Caicos Islands (Oranjestad, Aruba; 30 November 2023)

Biggest defeat
- Aruba 0–14 Haiti (Puerto Rico, 21 August 2015)

The Aruba women's national football team (Papiamento: selekshon feminino di futbòl Aruba, Dutch: Arubaans vrouwenvoetbalelftal) represents Aruba in international football competitions. Its governing body is the Arubaanse Voetbal Bond.

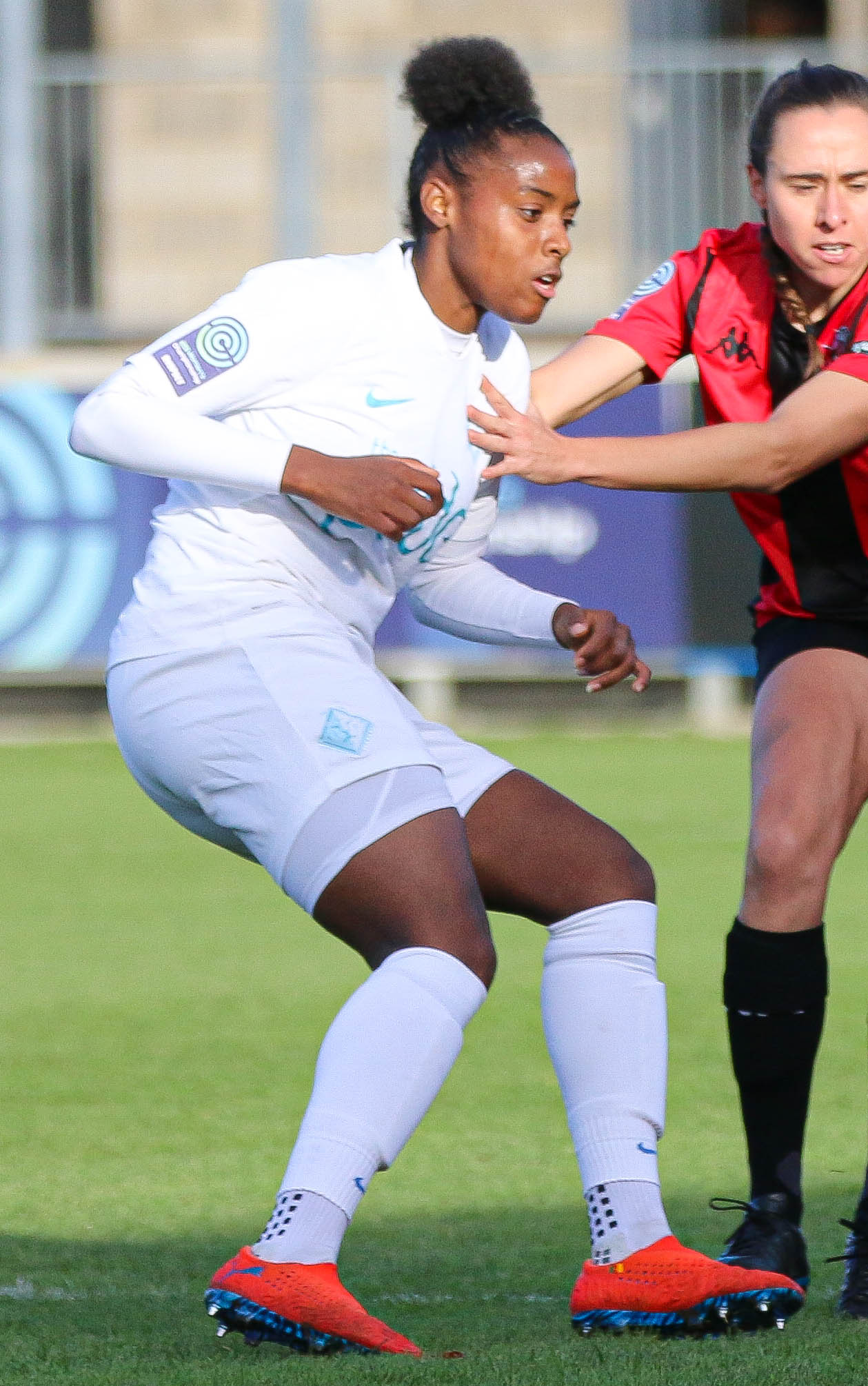
Vanessa Susanna, here on the left playing for the London City Lionesses, played numerous games for Aruba

== Results and fixtures ==
The following is a list of match results in the last 12 months, as well as any future matches that have been scheduled.

Legend

Win Draw Loss Fixture

=== 2025 ===
28 November 2025 2026 CONCACAF W Championship Q	Aruba	2–1	Saint Kitts and Nevis	Oranjestad
20:00 UTC−4	Doornkamp 43'; Hazel 62'	Report (FIFA); Report (CONCACAF)	Browne 36'	Stadium: Trinidad Stadium; Referee: Deily Gómez (Costa Rica)

== Coaching staff ==
=== Managerial history ===
- (Aruba) Mildred Wever (2011)
- (Aruba) Reinhard Breinburg (2019–2020)
- (Aruba) Glenford Sambo (2022–2023)
- (Aruba) Veron Albertsz (2023–2024)
- (Netherlands) Arjan van der Laan (2024–present)

== Players ==
=== Current squad ===
The following 23 players were called for the 2026 CONCACAF W Championship qualification match against Cuba on 7 March 2026.

No.	Pos.	Player	Date of birth (age)	Club
1	GK	Hadassah Kock	10 March 2005 (age 21)	(Royal Dutch Football Association) Sparta Rotterdam
18	GK	Richdienne Croes	6 November 2008 (age 18)	(Royal Dutch Football Association) Forum Sport
21	GK	Dylana Veenstra	7 May 2010 (age 16)	(Aruba Football Federation) SV Britannia
2	DF	Joya Tromp	21 November 2008 (age 17)	
4	DF	Michaela Netto	28 February 2007 (age 19)	(Royal Dutch Football Association) FC Utrecht
5	DF	Dyviënne Henriquez	29 January 2005 (age 21)	
13	DF	Joyce Chen	7 April 2004 (age 22)	(Aruba Football Federation) SV Racing Club
14	DF	Genesis Hazel	15 May 2007 (age 19)	(Royal Dutch Football Association) Excelsior Rotterdam
15	DF	Sofia Mora	19 July 2008 (age 18)	(Aruba Football Federation) SV Bubali
17	DF	Jayla Croes	29 November 2006 (age 19)	(Royal Dutch Football Association) FC Skillz
3	MF	Niamh Tromp	1 July 2009 (age 17)	(Royal Dutch Football Association) NEC Nijmegen
6	MF	Soraya Verhoeve (Captain)	28 December 1997 (age 28)	(Royal Dutch Football Association) FC Utrecht
7	MF	Tarianna Doornkamp	11 August 2003 (age 23)	(Royal Dutch Football Association) FC Rijnvogels
8	MF	Adannayah Breinburg	1 January 2009 (age 17)	(Royal Dutch Football Association) Excelsior Rotterdam
10	MF	Aisse Gumbs	6 August 1997 (age 29)	(Hellenic Football Federation) Panathinaikos
11	MF	Jennifer Henao	3 July 2001 (age 25)	(Aruba Football Federation) SV Britannia
12	MF	Delilah Croes	17 April 2005 (age 21)	(Royal Dutch Football Association) FC Skillz
20	MF	Kim Schoppema	19 November 2008 (age 17)	(Aruba Football Federation) SV Britannia
23	MF	Izaline Angela	20 November 1998 (age 27)	(Royal Dutch Football Association) FC Rijnvogels
9	FW	Zyana Rogers	26 December 2010 (age 15)	(Aruba Football Federation) SV Britannia
19	FW	Bonny Lammers	19 December 2003 (age 22)	(Royal Dutch Football Association) De Graafschap
22	FW	Jill Dreischor	9 March 2008 (age 18)	(Royal Dutch Football Association) VV Nieuwenhoorn
24	FW	Vanessa Susanna	29 July 1997 (age 29)	(Royal Dutch Football Association) ADO Den Haag

=== Recent call-ups ===
The following players have been called up to Curaçao squad in the past 12 months.

Pos.	Player	Date of birth (age)	Caps	Goals	Club	Latest call-up
GK	Betealie Stamper	6 June 2007 (age 19)	-	-		v. St. Kitts and Nevis, 28 November 2025
MF	Deniciënne Maduro	25 July 2011 (age 15)	-	-	(Aruba) SV Estrella	v. St. Kitts and Nevis, 28 November 2025

== Competitive record ==
=== FIFA Women's World Cup ===
FIFA Women's World Cup record
Year	Result	Pld	W	D*	L	GF	GA
(China) 1991 to (United States) 2003	Did not exist						
(China) 2007	Did not qualify						
(Germany) 2011	Did not enter						
(Canada) 2015	Did not enter						
(France) 2019	Did not qualify						
(Australia) (New Zealand) 2023	Did not qualify						
(Brazil) 2027	Did not qualify						
(Costa Rica) (Jamaica) (Mexico) (United States) 2031	To be determined						
(United Kingdom) 2035	To be determined						
Total	–	–	–	–	–	–	–

*Draws include knockout matches decided on penalty kicks.

=== Olympic Games ===
Summer Olympics record									Qualifying record					
Year	Round	Position	Pld	W	D*	L	GF	GA	Pld	W	D*	L	GF	GA
(United States) 1996 to (Greece) 2004	Did not exist								Did not exist					
(China) 2008	Did not enter								Did not enter					
(United Kingdom) 2012	Did not qualify								3	0	0	3	0	17
(Brazil) 2016	Did not qualify								3	0	0	3	0	25
(Japan) 2020	Did not qualify								4	0	0	4	2	13
(France) 2024	Did not qualify								2022 CONCACAF W Championship					
(United States) 2028	Did not qualify								2026 CONCACAF W Championship					
Total	–	–	–	–	–	–	–	–	10	0	0	10	2	55

*Draws include knockout matches decided on penalty kicks.

=== CONCACAF W Championship ===
CONCACAF W Championship record								Qualification record					
Year	Result	Pld	W	D*	L	GF	GA	Pld	W	D*	L	GF	GA
(Haiti) 1991 to (United States) (Canada) 2002	Did not exist							Did not exist					
(United States) 2006	Did not qualify							2	0	0	2	1	5
(Mexico) 2010	Did not enter							Did not enter					
(United States) 2014	Did not enter							Did not enter					
(United States) 2018	Did not qualify							4	1	0	3	2	20
(Mexico) 2022	Did not qualify							4	0	1	3	3	20
(United States) 2026	Did not qualify							4	2	0	2	9	6
Total	–	–	–	–	–	–	–	10	3	0	7	12	31

*Draws include knockout matches decided on penalty kicks.

=== CONCACAF W Gold Cup ===
CONCACAF W Gold Cup record								Qualification record							
Year	Result	GP	W	D*	L	GF	GA	Division	Group	GP	W	D*	L	GF	GA
(United States) 2024	Did not qualify							C	A	6	3	0	3	19	6
(N/A) 2029	To be determined							To be determined							
Total	–	–	–	–	–	–	–	–	–	6	3	0	3	19	6

*Draws include knockout matches decided on penalty kicks.

=== CFU Women's Caribbean Cup ===
CFU Women's Caribbean Cup record
Year	Result	Pld	W	D*	L	GF	GA
(Haiti) 2000	Did not enter						
(Trinidad and Tobago) 2014	First round	3	0	0	3	0	4
2018	Did not enter						
Total	–	3	0	0	3	0	4

*Draws include knockout matches decided on penalty kicks.

== All-time record ==
As of 18 September 2021

Against	Played	Won	Drawn	Lost	GF	GA	GD
Antigua and Barbuda	1	0	0	1	0	1	−1
Cuba	1	0	0	1	0	6	−6
Haiti	1	0	0	1	0	8	−8
Netherlands Antilles	1	0	0	1	1	2	−1
Saint Vincent and the Grenadines	1	0	0	1	0	2	−2
Suriname	2	0	0	2	0	6	−6
U.S. Virgin Islands	1	0	0	1	0	1	−1
Total	8	0	0	8	1	26	−25

== See also ==
- Sport in Aruba
  - Football in Aruba
    - Women's football in Aruba
- Aruba men's national football team
