= Maëva Salomon =

French footballer (born 1997)

Personal information
- Full name: Maëva Stacy Salomon
- Date of birth: 29 June 1997 (age 29)
- Place of birth: Villepinte, France
- Height: 1.70 m (5 ft 7 in)
- Positions: Midfielder; forward

Team information
- Current team: Servette FC Chênois
- Number: 9

Youth career
- 2012–2014: Paris Saint-Germain

Senior career*
Years	Team	Apps	(Gls)
2014–2015	Paris Saint-Germain	1	(0)
2015–2016	Saint-Maur	7	(3)
2016–2017	Bordeaux	13	(0)
2017–2018	Brest	20	(5)
2018–2020	Marseille	32	(15)
2020–2021	Metz	5	(2)
2021–2023	US Orléans	34	(17)
2023–2024	Marseille	21	(9)
2024–2025	Le Mans	18	(7)
2025–	Servette FC Chênois	0	(0)

International career^{‡}
2013	France U16	3	(0)
2015	France U19	6	(2)
2023–	Martinique	2	(1)
- * Club domestic league appearances and goals as of 11 May 2025 ‡ National team caps and goals as of 11 May 2025

Maëva Stacy Salomon (born 29 June 1997) is a professional footballer who plays as a Midfielder or as a forward for Women's Super League club Servette FC Chênois. Born in metropolitan France, she plays for the Martinique national team.

== Club career ==
On 20 July 2017, Maëva joined Stade brestois 29 in the Division 2 Féminine.

She announced her departure from the Les Phocéennes on 12 June 2020. a month later She joined FC Metz.

On 26 June 2023, Salomon rejoined Marseille on a one-season contract.

In June 2024, She joined fellow Seconde Ligue club Le Mans. Since then, the forward has been a standout player, scoring four goals in six matches and playing a vital role in the team's attacking play, which has led her to be voted October Player of the Month. She followed it up with another title in November, making it two in a row.

== International career ==
Born in mainland France, Salomon is of Martiniquais descent. She represented France at the youth level, playing for the under-16 and under-19 teams. In October 2023, she was included in Martinique's squad for the 2024 CONCACAF W Gold Cup qualification. Making her debut as a starter on 25 October, she scored her first goal for the Caribbean island just four days later, finding the net in the 44th minute to equalize the score against Nicaragua.

== Career statistics ==
=== Club ===
As of match played 11 May 2025

Appearances and goals by club, season and competition
Club	Season	League			National cup		Total	
Club	Season	Division	Apps	Goals	Apps	Goals	Apps	Goals
PSG	2014–15	Division 1 Féminine	1	0	—		1	0
PSG	Total		1	0	—		1	0
Saint-Maur	2015–16	Division 1 Féminine	4	1	3	2	7	3
Saint-Maur	Total		4	1	3	2	7	3
Bordeaux	2016–17	Division 1 Féminine	13	0	—		13	0
Bordeaux	Total		13	0	—		13	0
Brest	2017–18	Division 2 Féminine	17	3	3	2	20	5
Brest	Total		17	3	3	2	20	5
Marseille	2018–19	Division 2 Féminine	20	12	—		20	12
Marseille	2019–20	Division 1 Féminine	11	3	1	0	12	3
Marseille	2023–24	Division 2 Féminine	18	4	3	5	21	9
Marseille	Total		49	19	4	5	53	24
Metz	2020–21	Division 2 Féminine	5	2	—		5	2
Metz	Total		5	2	—		5	2
Orléans	2021–22	Division 2 Féminine	12	5	1	0	13	5
Orléans	2022–23	Division 2 Féminine	20	11	1	1	21	12
Orléans	Total		32	16	2	1	34	17
Le Mans	2024–25	Seconde Ligue	17	7	—		17	7
Le Mans	Total		17	7	—		17	7
Career total			138	48	12	10	150	58

=== International ===
As of match played 29 October 2024

Appearances and goals by national team and year
National team	Year	Apps	Goals
Martinique	2023	2	1
Total		2	1

Scores and results list Martinique's goal tally first, score column indicates score after each Salomon goal.

List of international goals scored by Maëva Salomon
No.	Date	Venue	Opponent	Score	Result	Competition
1	29 October 2023	Estadio Nacional de Fútbol, Managua, Nicaragua	Nicaragua	1–1	1–1	2024 CONCACAF W Gold Cup qualification
