= Mikhaila Bowden =

Belizean footballer (born 1993)

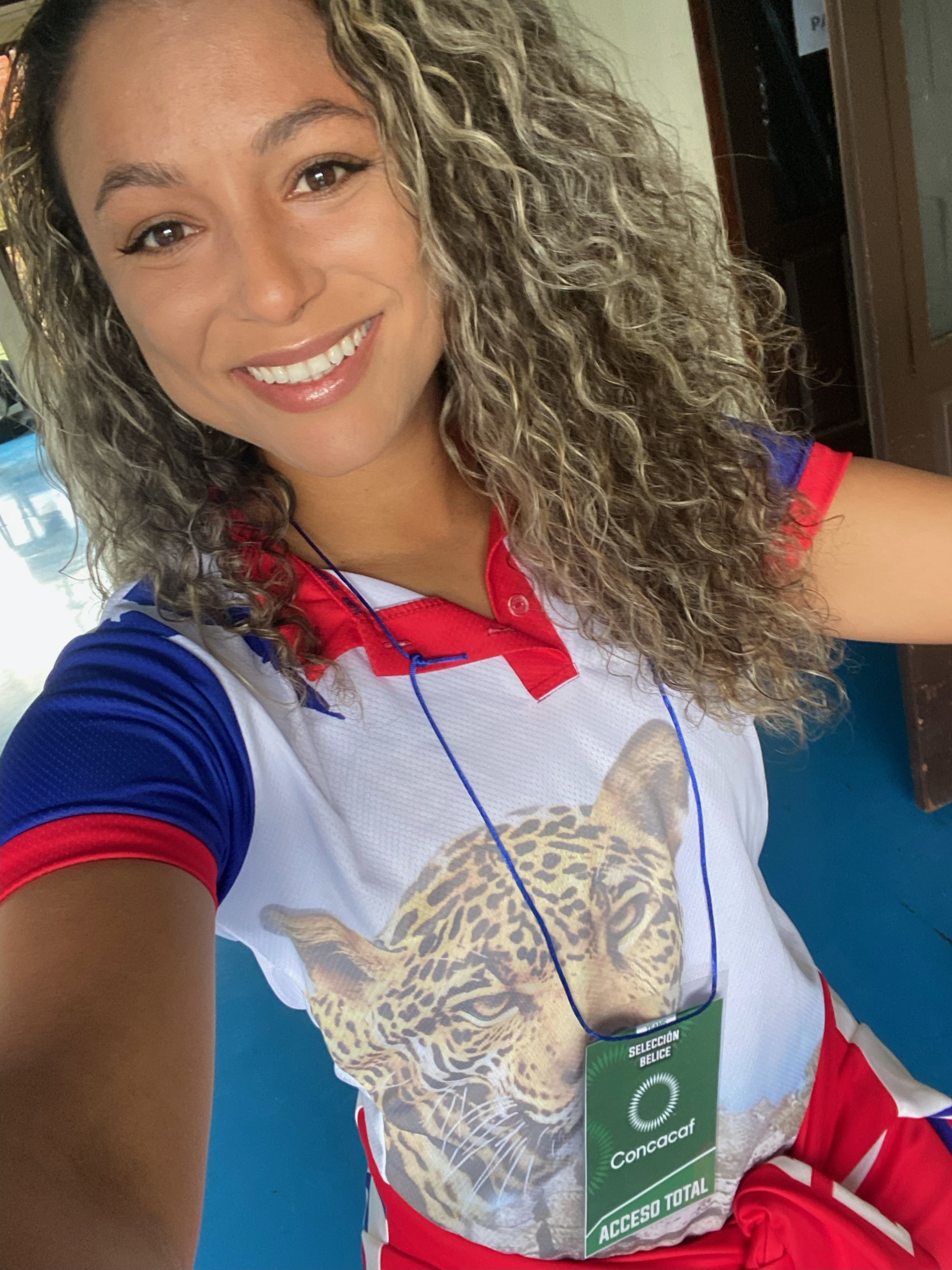
- Bowden in 2022

Personal information
- Full name: Mikhaila Bowden Gonzalez
- Date of birth: 22 August 1993 (age 33)
- Place of birth: United States
- Height: 1.68 m (5 ft 6 in)
- Position: Defender

Youth career
- 2007–2010: So Cal Blues
- 2007–2010: Ocean View Seahawks

College career
| Years | Team | Apps | (Gls) |
| 2011–2014 | Boise State Broncos | 83 | (0) |

Senior career*
| Years | Team | Apps | (Gls) |
| 2017-2019 | Southern United FC | | |

International career^{‡}
| 2022– | Belize | 7 | (5) |
- * Club domestic league appearances and goals ‡ National team caps and goals as of 26 October 2023

Mikhaila Bowden Gonzalez (born 22 August 1993) is a footballer who plays as a defender. Born in the United States, she is a Belize international.

== Early life ==
Bowden started playing football at the age of four. When Bowden was eighteen years old, her younger half-sister committed suicide.

== Education ==
Bowden attended Boise State University in the United States, where she was regarded as one of the soccer team's most important players.

== Club career ==
In 2017, Bowden signed for Australian side Southern United FC, where she was described as "established herself as one of the best centre backs in the competition".

== International career ==
Bowen has played for the Belize women's national football team, where she has been regarded as one of the team's most important players.

== Style of play ==
Bowden mainly operates as a defender and is known for her free-kick taking ability.

== Personal life ==
Bowden was born to a Belizean father. She has regarded United States international Brandi Chastain as her football idol.
