= Shanice Alfred =

Guyanese footballer (born 2001)

Personal information
- Date of birth: 29 August 2001 (age 25)
- Place of birth: Soufrière, Saint Lucia
- Height: 1.75 m (5 ft 9 in)
- Position: Forward

Youth career
- Airdrie & District SA
- Calgary Blizzard SC

College career
Years	Team	Apps	(Gls)
2019	MacEwan Griffins	1	(0)
2021–2023	Seneca Sting	25	(48)

Senior career*
Years	Team	Apps	(Gls)
2024	Pickering FC	2	(0)
2024	→ Pickering FC B	2	(0)

International career^{‡}
2020	Guyana U20		
2022–	Guyana	6+	(3+)
- * Club domestic league appearances and goals as of 30 May 2024 ‡ National team caps and goals as of 3 December 2023

Shanice Alfred (born 29 August 2001) is a footballer who plays as a forward. Born in Saint Lucia, she plays for the Guyana women's national team.

== Early life ==
Alfred was born in St. Lucia, before later moving to Canada at age four. She began playing youth soccer at age seven with Airdrie & District SA. She later played youth soccer with Calgary Blizzard SC.

== College career ==
In 2019, she began attending MacEwan University, where she played for the women's soccer team.

In 2020, she moved to Ontario and began attending Seneca College. She made her debut on September 18, 2021, netting a hat trick in a 9–0 victory over the Sault Cougars and was named the school Athlete of the Week. In 2021, she was named the OCAA Women's Soccer Central Division Player of the Year, and was named to the OCAA Women's Soccer Central Division All-Star Team and a CCAA Women's Soccer All-Canadians. On September 13, 2022, she scored four goals in the season opener, in a 10–1 victory over the Loyalist Lancers. She was twice named the Athlete of the Week in 2022, and helped the team advance to the CCAA semi-finals. In 2022, she was named an OCAA Women's Soccer East Division First Team All-Star. On October 14, 2023, Alfred tied an Ontario Colleges Athletic Association record, scoring nine goals in a single match, in a 10–0 victory over the Loyalist Lancers. In 2023, she helped Seneca win their first ever CCAA national title, also setting a team record with 25 goals in a single season. She was named the OCAA Women's Soccer Player of the Year, the OCAA Top Scorer, and was named an OCAA East Division League First-Team All-Star and CCAA All-Canadian.

== Club career ==
In 2024, she joined Pickering FC in League1 Ontario.

== International career ==
Alfred was eligible to represent St. Lucia (where she was born and where her mother is from), Guyana (where her father is from), and Canada (where she was raised).

In March and April 2017, she attended training camps with the Canada U17 team.

In 2020, she began playing with the Guyana U20 team at the 2020 CONCACAF Women's U-20 Championship. She later played with the Guyana senior team.

== See also ==
- List of Guyana women's international footballers
