= Vanessa Susanna =

Aruban footballer (born 1997)

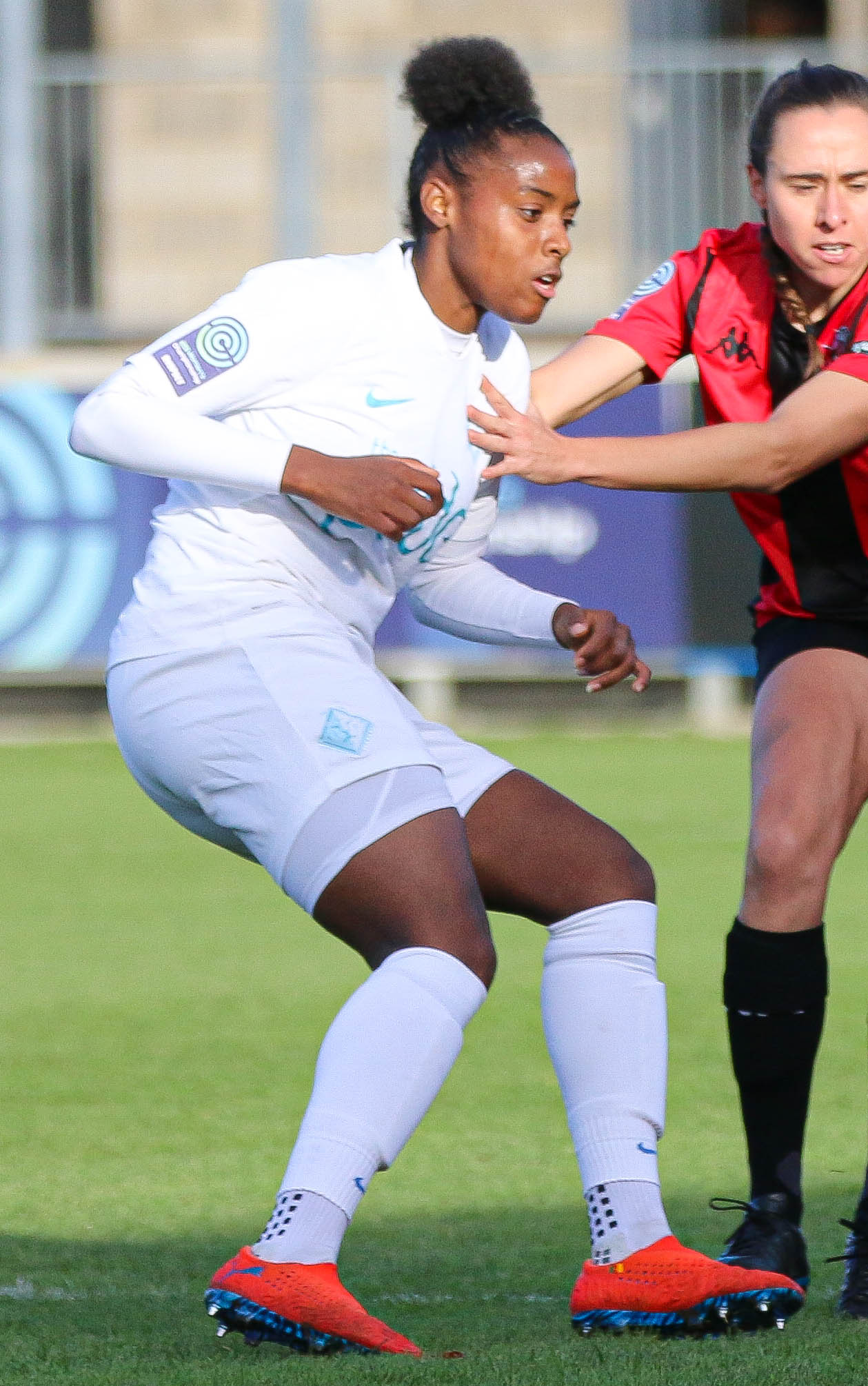
- Susanna with London City Lionesses in 2019

Personal information
- Full name: Vanessa Haydee Lisanne Susanna
- Date of birth: 29 July 1997 (age 29)
- Place of birth: Tilburg, Netherlands
- Height: 1.70 m (5 ft 7 in)
- Position: Forward

Team information
- Current team: ADO Den Haag
- Number: 17

Youth career
- 2003–2007: VV ZIGO
- 2007–2009: Willem II
- 2009–2011: NOAD
- 2011–2013: SC 't Zand
- 2013–2015: SV Saestum

Senior career*
Years	Team	Apps	(Gls)
2015–2018	PSV	46	(14)
2018–2019	Anderlecht	7	(0)
2019–2020	London City Lionesses	11	(3)
2020–2021	Hellas Verona	14	(1)
2021–2022	Gent	19	(5)
2022–	ADO Den Haag	31	(1)

International career^{‡}
2011	Netherlands U15	5	(1)
2022–	Aruba	8	(6)
- * Club domestic league appearances and goals as of 16:44, 25 June 2024 ‡ National team caps and goals as of 29 November 2023

Vanessa Haydee Lisanne Susanna (born 29 July 1997) is a footballer who plays as a forward for Eredivisie club ADO Den Haag. Born and raised in the Netherlands to Aruban parents, she capped for the Netherlands and Aruba at under-15 and senior levels, respectively.

== Early life ==
Susanna is a native of Tilburg, the Netherlands.

== Career ==
=== Youth career ===
As a youth player, she joined the youth academy of Dutch side Saestum where she became their all-time top scorer.

=== Senior club career ===
Susanna started her career with PSV in the Netherlands. She scored on her league debut against Twente on 30 October 2015, scoring in the 87th minute. Susanna scored a hattrick against Excelsior Rotterdam on 1 September 2017.

In 2018, she signed for the Belgian club Anderlecht, helping them win the league.

In 2019, Susanna signed for London City Lionesses in England, where she made 17 appearances and scored 3 goals in all competitions. She made her league debut against Charlton Athletic on 15 September 2019. Susanna scored her first league goal against Crystal Palace on 17 November 2019, scoring in the 69th minute.

In 2020, she signed for Italian team Verona. She made her league debut against Pink Sport Bari on 10 October 2020. Susanna scored her first league goal against AC Milan on 23 May 2021, scoring in the 67th minute.

During Gent's 2021/22 season, she scored 5 goals.

After that, Susanna signed for ADO in the Netherlands. She made her league debut against Telstar on 18 September 2022. Susanna scored her first league goal against Heerenveen on 3 March 2023, scoring in the 5th minute. On 12 June 2023, she extended her contract.

=== International career ===
She previously played for the Dutch youth national team alongside the likes of Netherlands internationals Vivianne Miedema and Jill Roord.

Susanna scored a hattrick against Turks and Caicos Islands on 30 November 2023.

== Style of play ==
Susanna can operate as an attacking midfielder, winger, or striker, and is known for her ability to take on opponents and hold up the ball, physicality, and speed.

== Personal life ==
She has a tattoo on her legs which has the words "self made" inscribed on it.

== Career statistics ==
=== International ===
As of 29 November 2023

National team	Years	Apps	Goals
Aruba	2022	4	2
Aruba	2023	4	4
Total		8	6
