= United States Virgin Islands women's national soccer team =

Women's national association football team

U.S. Virgin Islands
- Nickname: Dashing Eagles
- Association: USVI Soccer Federation
- Confederation: CONCACAF
- FIFA code: VIR
First colors	Second colors

FIFA ranking
- Current: 185 (June 16, 2026)
- Highest: 126 (June 2018)
- Lowest: 184 (March 2024; December 2024 – August 2025)

First international
- British Virgin Islands 1–3 U.S. Virgin Islands (British Virgin Islands; 1 April 2006)

Biggest win
- U.S. Virgin Islands 8–0 British Virgin Islands (Christiansted, US Virgin Islands; 24 October 2025)

Biggest defeat
- U.S. Virgin Islands 0–14 Cuba (Santo Domingo Este, Dominican Republic; 5 October 2007); Haiti 14–0 U.S. Virgin Islands (Port-au-Prince, Haiti; 20 April 2018)

The United States Virgin Islands women's national soccer team represents the United States Virgin Islands in women's international soccer, and is overseen by the U.S. Virgin Islands Soccer Federation.

== Recent schedule and results ==
The following is a list of match results in the last 12 months, as well as any future matches that have been scheduled.

Legend

Win Draw Lose Fixture

=== 2025 ===
October 24, 2025 Friendly	U.S. Virgin Islands	8–0	British Virgin Islands	Christiansted, U.S. Virgin Islands
16:00 ET	Johanna James 3'; Kelaine Smith 14' (o.g.); Brianna Brudy 18', 25', 44'; Maia Foley 20'; Josie Couch 54'; Mackiesh Taylor-Jones 90' (pen.)			Stadium: Bethlehem Soccer Complex; Attendance: 95; Referee: Taylor MacDonald

27 November 2025 2026 CONCACAF W Championship Q	U.S. Virgin Islands	3–1	Saint Lucia	Kingshill
16:00 UTC−4	Vialva 10'; Frost 32'; Hood 49'	Report (FIFA); Report (CONCACAF)	St. Louis 44'	Stadium: Bethlehem Soccer Complex; Referee: Carly Shaw-MacLaren (Canada)

== Players ==
=== Current squad ===
- The following players are named in the squad for the 2026 CONCACAF W Championship qualification matches against Saint Lucia on 27 November 2025 .

No.	Pos.	Player	Date of birth (age)	Caps	Goals	Club
	GK	Jenna Rehm	January 26, 2002 (age 24)			(United States Soccer Federation) Trevecca Trojans
	GK	Levania Lawrence	October 25, 1998 (age 28)			
	DF	Naya Vialva	September 2, 2001 (age 25)			(Portuguese Football Federation) Vitória S.C.
	DF	Neah Williams	May 21, 2010 (age 16)			(United States Soccer Federation) Albion Hurricanes ECNL
17	DF	Jordan Crawford	October 4, 1999 (age 27)	4	0	
	DF	Jade Browne	November 4, 2008 (age 18)			(U.S. Virgin Islands Soccer Federation) CAPA
	DF	Zaniya Gonzague	July 22, 2007 (age 19)			(United States Soccer Federation) JSU Tigers
	DF	Asanah Gordon	February 1, 2007 (age 19)			(United States Soccer Federation) St. Thomas Celts
	DF	Kelsey Hill				
	DF	Taylor Crawford	April 5, 2002 (age 24)			
	MF	Maia Foley	January 20, 1998 (age 28)			
10	MF	Kathryn Turner	July 11, 1993 (age 33)			
7	MF	Josie Couch	October 26, 1993 (age 33)			
	MF	Ashleigh Speakman	May 18, 2009 (age 17)			
12	MF	Lita Frost	June 27, 2006 (age 20)	1		(United States Soccer Federation) GSW Hurricanes
	MF	Reagan Hood	October 19, 2009 (age 17)			
	FW	Johanna James	October 22, 2007 (age 19)			
	FW	Chloe Westbrook	May 12, 2005 (age 21)			
4	FW	Ariel Stolz	November 10, 1995 (age 30)	5	0	
	FW	Olivia Crikelair	May 12, 2010 (age 16)			(U.S. Virgin Islands Soccer Federation) St. Croix Kestrels
	FW	Camille Chambers	June 8, 2008 (age 18)			(United States Soccer Federation) Cedar Crest Falcons
	FW	Brianna Brudy	March 19, 2004 (age 22)			
	FW	Mackiesh Taylor	October 24, 1990 (age 36)			

=== Recent call-ups ===
The following players have been called up within the past 12 months.

Pos.	Player	Date of birth (age)	Caps	Goals	Club	Latest call-up

=== Notable players ===
- (United States Virgin Islands) Ariel Stolz - played for ŽNK Olimpija Ljubljana (Slovenia)

== Competitive record ==
=== World Cup ===
Women's World Cup Finals
Year	Result	GP	W	D*	L	GF	GA	GD
(China) 1991	Did not enter							
(Sweden) 1995	Did not enter							
(United States) 1999	Did not enter							
(United States) 2003	Did not qualify							
(China) 2007	Did not qualify							
(Germany) 2011	Did not qualify							
(Canada) 2015	Did not qualify							
(France) 2019	Did not qualify							
(Australia) (New Zealand) 2023	Did not qualify							
(Brazil) 2027	Did not qualify							
(Costa Rica) (Jamaica) (Mexico) (United States) 2031	To be determined							
(United Kingdom) 2035	To be determined							
Total	0/10	—	—	—	—	—	—	—

*Draws include knockout matches decided on penalty kicks.

=== Olympic Games ===
Summer Olympics record									Qualifying record					
Year	Round	Position	Pld	W	D*	L	GF	GA	Pld	W	D*	L	GF	GA
(United States) 1996 to (Australia) 2000	Did not enter								Did not enter					
(Greece) 2004	Withdrew								Withdrew					
(China) 2008	Did not qualify								3	1	0	2	5	18
(United Kingdom) 2012	Did not enter								Did not enter					
(Brazil) 2016	Did not enter								Did not enter					
(Japan) 2020	Did not qualify								4	0	0	4	1	21
(France) 2024	Did not qualify								2022 CONCACAF W Championship					
(United States) 2028	Did not qualify								2026 CONCACAF W Championship					
Total	–	–	–	–	–	–	–	–	7	1	0	6	6	39

*Draws include knockout matches decided on penalty kicks.

=== CONCACAF W Championship ===
CONCACAF W Championship record								Qualification record					
Year	Result	GP	W	D*	L	GF	GA	GP	W	D*	L	GF	GA
(Haiti) 1991	Did not enter												
(United States) 1993	Did not enter												
(Canada) 1994	Did not enter												
(Canada) 1998	Did not enter												
(United States) 2000	Did not enter												
(United States) (Canada) 2002	Did not qualify							2	0	0	2	1	8
(United States) 2006	Did not qualify							3	1	0	2	4	7
(Mexico) 2010	Did not qualify							2	0	0	2	1	10
(United States) 2014	Did not qualify							2014 Caribbean Cup					
(United States) 2018	Did not qualify							4	1	0	3	3	20
(Mexico) 2022	Did not qualify							4	0	0	4	0	22
(United States) 2026	Did not qualify							4	1	0	3	3	19
Total	0/12	—	—	—	—	—	—	19	3	0	14	12	86

*Draws include knockout matches decided on penalty kicks.

=== CONCACAF W Gold Cup ===
CONCACAF W Gold Cup record								Qualification record							
Year	Result	GP	W	D*	L	GF	GA	Division	Group	GP	W	D*	L	GF	GA
(United States) 2024	Did not qualify							C	C	4	1	1	2	2	7
(N/A) 2029	To be determined							To be determined							
Total	–	–	–	–	–	–	–	–	–	4	1	1	2	2	7

*Draws include knockout matches decided on penalty kicks.

=== CFU Women's Caribbean Cup ===
CFU Women's Caribbean Cup record
Year	Result	Pld	W	D*	L	GF	GA
(Haiti) 2000	Did not enter						
(Trinidad and Tobago) 2014	First round	3	1	1	1	1	1
(Haiti) 2018	N/A	2	0	0	2	0	21
Total	–	5	1	1	3	1	22

*Draws include knockout matches decided on penalty kicks.
