= Winibian Peralta =

Dominican Republic footballer (born 1997)

Personal information
- Full name: Winibian Judit Peralta Pérez
- Date of birth: 19 March 1997 (age 29)
- Place of birth: Dominican Republic
- Height: 1.56 m (5 ft 1 in)
- Position: Forward

Team information
- Current team: Club Necaxa
- Number: 9

Senior career*
Years	Team	Apps	(Gls)
- Bob Soccer School Fútbol Club
2019	Metropolitan FA	1	(1)
2022	Queensboro FC	11	(3)
2022–2023	AD Municipal Pérez Zeledón	16	(7)
2023–2024	Puerto Viejo Fútbol Club	29	(19)
2025	Club 5 de Abril	4	(4)
2025–	Club Necaxa	29	(1)

International career
2013	Dominican Republic U17	6	(12)
2014	Dominican Republic U20	2	(4)
2015–	Dominican Republic	24	(2)
- * Club domestic league appearances and goals

Winibian Judit Peralta Pérez (born 19 March 1997) is a Dominican Republic professional footballer who plays as a forward for Club Necaxa.

== Early life ==
Peralta was born on 19 March 1997 in the Dominican Republic. A native of Neiba, Dominican Republic, she studied civil engineering.

== Club career ==
Peralta started her career with Dominican Republic side Bob Soccer School Fútbol Club. Following her stint there, she signed for Puerto Rican side Metropolitan FA. Subsequently, she signed for American side Queensboro FC in 2022, where she made eleven league appearances and scored three goals.

The same year, she signed for Costa Rican side AD Municipal Pérez Zeledón, before signing for Costa Rican side Puerto Viejo Fútbol Club one year later, where she was the top scorer of the 2024 Costa Rican Women's Premier Division with eighteen goals. In 2025, she signed for Dominican Republic side Club 5 de Abril. Ahead of the 2025–26 season, she signed for Mexican side Club Necaxa.

== International career ==
Perlata is a Dominican Republic international. During February 2024, she played for the Dominican Republic women's national football team at the 2024 CONCACAF W Gold Cup.
