= CFU Women's Caribbean Cup =

Football tournament for the Caribbean Region

- Founded: 2000
- Region: Caribbean
- Teams: 8
- Current champions: Trinidad and Tobago
- Website: http://www.cfufootball.org
- 2018 CFU Women's Challenge Series

The Caribbean Football Union Women's Caribbean Cup is an international tournament for the women's national teams of the Caribbean Region.

== History ==
It first took place in 2000 and was later re-introduced in 2014. The 2014 edition was used as the Caribbean zone qualification competition for the 2014 CONCACAF Women's Championship.

In 2018, the CFU Women's Challenge Series was launched by the Caribbean Football Union, where 20 teams were divided into five groups. There is no overall champion, and medals are awarded to each group winner and runner-up.

== Results ==
Year	Host	Winner	Runner-up	Number of teams
2000	St. Lucia	Haiti	Saint Lucia	4 (13)
2014	Trinidad & Tobago	Trinidad & Tobago	Jamaica	8 (21)
2018	Group hosts: Saint Kitts & Nevis; Jamaica; Haiti; Antigua & Barbuda; Trinidad & Tobago	Group winners: Saint Lucia; Cuba; Haiti; Antigua & Barbuda; Trinidad & Tobago	Group runners-up: Saint Kitts & Nevis; Jamaica; U.S. Virgin Islands; Curaçao; Suriname	20
