= Saint Kitts and Nevis women's national football team =

Women's national association football team representing Saint Kitts and Nevis

Saint Kitts and Nevis
- Association: St. Kitts and Nevis; Football Association
- Confederation: CONCACAF
- Head coach: Earl Jones
- FIFA code: SKN
First colours	Second colours

FIFA ranking
- Current: 150 (16 June 2026)
- Highest: 110 (June 2014)
- Lowest: 140 (March – June 2025; December 2025)

First international
- Saint Kitts and Nevis 3–2 Antigua and Barbuda (Kingston, Jamaica; 8 May 2006)

Biggest win
- Saint Kitts and Nevis 10–0 Grenada (Trinidad and Tobago; May 23, 2018)

Biggest defeat
- Saint Kitts and Nevis 0–19 Costa Rica (Basseterre, Saint Kitts and Nevis; 4 December 2023)

The Saint Kitts and Nevis women's national football team is the national women's football team of Saint Kitts and Nevis and is overseen by the St. Kitts and Nevis Football Association.

== Results and fixtures ==
The following is a list of match results in the last 12 months, as well as any future matches that have been scheduled.

Legend

Win Draw Lose Fixture

=== 2025 ===
22 November 2025 Friendly match	Saint Kitts and Nevis	3–2	Anguilla	Basseterre, Saint Kitts and Nevis
15:00	TBA		Johnson (??); Johnson (??)	Stadium: National Bank Group Technical Center

23 November 2025 Friendly match	Saint Kitts and Nevis	1-1	Anguilla	Basseterre, Saint Kitts and Nevis
04:11				Stadium: National Bank Group Technical Center

28 November 2025 2026 CONCACAF W Championship Q	Aruba	2–1	Saint Kitts and Nevis	Oranjestad
20:00 UTC−4	Doornkamp 43'; Hazel 62'	Report (FIFA); Report (CONCACAF)	Browne 36'	Stadium: Trinidad Stadium; Referee: Deily Gómez (Costa Rica)

2 December 2025 2026 CONCACAF W Championship Q	Cuba	2–2	Saint Kitts and Nevis	Santiago de Cuba
15:00 UTC−5	Aldana 53', 71' (pen.)	Report (FIFA); Report (CONCACAF)	Browne 15'; Wanton 75' (o.g.)	Stadium: Estadio Antonio Maceo; Referee: Glenda López (Guatemala)

== Coaching staff ==
=== Managerial history ===
- (Saint Kitts and Nevis) Earl Jones (2020–2021)
- (United States) Jené Baclawski (2021–202?)
- Samuel Phipps(202?-202?)
- (Saint Kitts and Nevis) Earl Jones (202?–present)

== Players ==
=== Current squad ===
- The following players were named to the squad to play the 2026 CONCACAF W Championship qualification games against Aruba on 28 November 2025.

Caps and goals are updated as of 4 February 2020 after the match against Jamaica.

No.	Pos.	Player	Date of birth (age)	Caps	Goals	Club
1	GK	Kyra Dickinson	3 January 1993 (age 33)	8	0	(Canadian Soccer Association) Master's FA
	GK	Craivecia Sutton	1 September 2001 (age 25)	0	0	(St. Kitts and Nevis Football Association) Cayon FC
	GK	Jahkazia Smithen	29 September 2011 (age 15)	0	0	(St. Kitts and Nevis Football Association) St. Paul's United FC
	DF	Alexis Gordon	15 November 2006 (age 19)			(United States Soccer Federation) Albany Great Danes
	DF	Sharema Blake	1 July 2007 (age 19)			(St. Kitts and Nevis Football Association) Newtown United
	DF	Myesha Rawlins	13 October 2009 (age 17)			(St. Kitts and Nevis Football Association) Cayon FC
	DF	Kionna Mills	20 December 2006 (age 19)			(St. Kitts and Nevis Football Association) Newtown United
	DF	Jordane Bradshaw	20 January 2011 (age 15)			
	DF	Shenica Francis	4 March 2005 (age 21)			(St. Kitts and Nevis Football Association) St. Paul's United FC
	MF	Christi-Anne Mills	27 July 2002 (age 24)			(Football Association of Indonesia) Persija Jakarta
	MF	Cloey Uddenberg	13 November 2002 (age 23)			(Canadian Soccer Association) AFC Toronto
	MF	Tarvia Phillip	10 April 1997 (age 29)			(St. Kitts and Nevis Football Association) Conaree FC
	MF	Kaylee Bennett	23 March 2004 (age 22)			
	MF	Takia Carty	26 September 2009 (age 17)			
	MF	Jasonna Williams	28 March 2003 (age 23)			(St. Kitts and Nevis Football Association) Cayon FC
	MF	Zonia Marshall	6 May 2003 (age 23)			(United States Soccer Federation) Butler Grizzlies
11	MF	Phoenetia Browne (captain)	22 April 1994 (age 32)	15	19	(Royal Spanish Football Federation) RCD Espanyol
	FW	Jorda James	15 March 2008 (age 18)			(United States Soccer Federation) UMBC Retrievers
	FW	Ellie Stokes	21 November 2003 (age 22)			(United States Soccer Federation) Colgate Raiders
	FW	Omeara Delaney	22 May 2009 (age 17)			

=== Recent call ups ===
Pos.	Player	Date of birth (age)	Caps	Goals	Club	Latest call-up

== Competitive record ==
=== FIFA Women's World Cup ===
FIFA Women's World Cup record
Year	Result	GP	W	D*	L	GF	GA	GD
(China) 1991	Did not enter							
(Sweden) 1995	Did not enter							
(United States) 1999	Did not enter							
(United States) 2003	Did not enter							
(China) 2007	Did not qualify							
(Germany) 2011	Did not qualify							
(Canada) 2015	Did not qualify							
(France) 2019	Did not qualify							
(Australia) (New Zealand) 2023	Did not qualify							
(Brazil) 2027	Did not qualify							
(Costa Rica) (Jamaica) (Mexico) (United States) 2031	To be determined							
(United Kingdom) 2035	To be determined							
Total	0/10	-	-	-	-	-	-	-

*Draws include knockout matches decided on penalty kicks.

=== Olympic Games ===
Summer Olympics record									Qualifying record					
Year	Round	Position	Pld	W	D*	L	GF	GA	Pld	W	D*	L	GF	GA
(United States) 1996 to (United Kingdom) 2012	Did not enter								Did not enter					
(Brazil) 2016	Did not qualify								2	0	0	2	0	14
(Japan) 2020	Did not qualify								7	3	0	4	20	26
(France) 2024	Did not qualify								2022 CONCACAF W Championship					
(United States) 2028	Did not qualify								2026 CONCACAF W Championship					
Total	–	–	–	–	–	–	–	–	9	3	0	6	20	40

*Draws include knockout matches decided on penalty kicks.

=== CONCACAF W Championship ===
CONCACAF W Championship record								Qualification record					
Year	Result	GP	W	D*	L	GF	GA	GP	W	D*	L	GF	GA
(Haiti) 1991	Did not enter							Did not enter					
(United States) 1993	Did not enter							Did not enter					
(Canada) 1994	Did not enter							Did not enter					
(Canada) 1998	Did not enter							Did not enter					
(United States) 2000	Did not enter							Did not enter					
(Canada) (United States) 2002	Did not enter							Did not enter					
(United States) 2006	Did not qualify							3	1	0	2	5	16
(Mexico) 2010	Did not qualify							2	1	0	1	2	7
(United States) 2014	Did not qualify							2014 Caribbean Cup					
(United States) 2018	Did not qualify							4	3	1	0	20	2
(Mexico) 2022	Did not qualify							4	3	0	1	13	9
(United States) 2026	Did not qualify							4	0	1	3	4	9
Total	0/12	-	-	-	-	-	-	17	8	2	7	44	41

*Draws include knockout matches decided on penalty kicks.

=== CONCACAF W Gold Cup ===
CONCACAF W Gold Cup record								Qualification record							
Year	Result	GP	W	D*	L	GF	GA	Division	Group	GP	W	D*	L	GF	GA
(United States) 2024	Did not qualify							A	C	4	0	0	4	0	54
(N/A) 2029	To be determined							To be determined							
Total	–	–	–	–	–	–	–	–	–	4	0	0	4	0	54

*Draws include knockout matches decided on penalty kicks.

=== CFU Women's Caribbean Cup ===
CFU Women's Caribbean Cup record
Year	Result	Pld	W	D*	L	GF	GA
(Haiti) 2000	Did not enter						
(Trinidad and Tobago) 2014	Final round	6	3	0	3	12	15
(Saint Kitts and Nevis) 2018	N/A	3	2	1	0	3	1
Total	–	9	5	1	3	15	16

*Draws include knockout matches decided on penalty kicks.
