= Belize women's national football team =

Women's national football team representing Belize

Belize
- Association: Football Federation of Belize
- Confederation: CONCACAF (North America)
- Sub-confederation: UNCAF
- Head coach: Melanie Matute
- Top scorer: Mikhaila Bowden (6)
- Home stadium: FFB Stadium
- FIFA code: BLZ
First colours	Second colours

FIFA ranking
- Current: 168 (16 June 2026)
- Highest: 107 (July 2003)
- Lowest: 173 (December 2025)

First international
- Guatemala 12–0 Belize (Guatemala City, Guatemala; 25 November 2001)

Biggest win
- Turks and Caicos Islands 0–9 Belize (Providenciales, Turks and Caicos Islands; 26 August 2019)

Biggest defeat
- Guatemala 18–0 Belize (Guatemala City, Guatemala; 19 November 2003)

The Belize women's national football team (Spanish: Selección femenina de fútbol de Belice) is overseen by the Football Federation of Belize. It is affiliated to the Central American Football Union of CONCACAF.

== History ==
=== Overview ===
The Belizean team debut on 25 November 2001 in the 2001 Central American Games with Guatemala, which resulted in a crushing 12–0 defeat, two days later played against El Salvador, against which they also lost, 6–0.

Like its male counterpart, is the worst team in Central America according to FIFA ranking, which places the team in the 120th position. All their games have been against Central American teams, but never played with one of them, Honduras.

At the age of 11, Belize international Khalydia Velasquez became the youngest player to score in an official FIFA sanctioned international tournament.

The team had never won or tied and game until the 2022 CONCACAF W Championships where the team tied their first game on April 6, 2022, and won their first game on April 12, 2022.

== Coaching staff ==
=== Managerial history ===
- Wayne Casimiro(20??–2024)
- Melanie Matute(2024–present)

== Results and fixtures ==
The following is a list of match results in the last 12 months, as well as any future matches that have been scheduled.

Legend

Win Draw Lose Fixture

=== 2025 ===
30 November 2026 CONCACAF W Championship Q	Belize	0-9	Haiti	Belmopan, Belize
19:00 UTC−6		Report (FIFA); Report (CONCACAF)	Mondésir 12', 18', 32', 63'; Louis 13', 50'; Éloissaint 43'; Dumornay 78' (pen.), 87'	Stadium: FFB Stadium; Referee: Karen Hernández Andrade (Mexico)

== Players ==
=== Current squad ===
- The following is the final squad named for the 2026 CONCACAF W Championship qualification match against Haiti on 30 November 2025.

No.	Pos.	Player	Date of birth (age)	Caps	Goals	Club
1	GK	Jasmin Armstrong			0	(Football Federation of Belize) Sagitun Girlz FC
12	GK	Denisia Pineda			0	(Football Federation of Belize) Napoles FC
22	GK	Alisha Alvarez			0	(Football Federation of Belize) Cayo Dreamers FC
3	DF	Shadette Lino				(Football Federation of Belize) Jewel Fury FC
4	DF	Mikhaila Bowden				(United States Soccer Federation) SoCal FC
5	DF	Shante Chacon				(United States Soccer Federation) OLLU Saints
7	DF	Stephanie Barrientos				(Football Federation of Belize) Napoles FC
14	DF	Iamara Baptist				(Football Federation of Belize) Sagitun Girlz FC
16	DF	Valiene Lambert				(Football Federation of Belize) Jewel Fury FC
17	DF	Jasha Bernardez				(Football Federation of Belize) Napoles FC
19	DF	Gimayma Martinez				(Football Federation of Belize) Sagitun Girlz FC
23	DF	Jinnelle Pott				(Football Federation of Belize) Napoles FC
6	MF	Abbi Calvio				(United States Soccer Federation) Borton College NC
8	MF	Sabrina Eiley (c)				(Football Federation of Belize) Sagitun Girlz FC
9	MF	Roshanny Narvaez				(Football Federation of Belize) Napoles FC
11	MF	Ceneia Apolonio				(Football Federation of Belize) Jewel Fury FC
13	MF	Alisha Terry				(Football Federation of Belize) Corozal Elite FC
18	MF	Carlene Tillett				(Football Federation of Belize) Napoles FC
20	MF	Loraine Cal				(Football Federation of Belize) Napoles FC
21	MF	Tanya Teul				(Football Federation of Belize) Napoles FC
2	FW	Jayda Brown				(Football Federation of Belize) Napoles FC
10	FW	Khalydia Velasquez				(Football Federation of Belize) Napoles FC
15	FW	Shamika Lambey				(Football Federation of Belize) Jewel Fury FC

=== Recent call ups ===
Pos.	Player	Date of birth (age)	Caps	Goals	Club	Latest call-up

=== Notable players ===
- (Belize) Mikhaila Bowden - played for Southern United (Australia)

== Competitive record ==
=== FIFA Women's World Cup ===
FIFA Women's World Cup record									Qualification record					
Year	Result	Position	Pld	W	D*	L	GF	GA	Pld	W	D*	L	GF	GA
(China) 1991	Did not enter								Did not enter					
(Sweden) 1995	Did not enter								Did not enter					
(United States) 1999	Did not enter								Did not enter					
(United States) 2003	Did not enter								Did not enter					
(China) 2007	Did not enter								Did not enter					
(Germany) 2011	Did not qualify								2	0	0	2	1	14
(Canada) 2015	Did not qualify								3	0	0	3	1	26
(France) 2019	Did not enter								Did not enter					
(Australia) (New Zealand) 2023	Did not qualify								4	1	1	2	4	15
(Brazil) 2027	Did not qualify								4	2	0	2	5	15
(Costa Rica) (Jamaica) (Mexico) (United States) 2031	To be determined								To be determined					
(United Kingdom) 2035	To be determined								To be determined					
Total	–	0/12	–	–	–	–	–	–	13	3	1	9	11	70

*Draws include knockout matches decided on penalty kicks.

=== Olympic Games ===
Summer Olympics record									Qualifying record					
Year	Round	Position	Pld	W	D*	L	GF	GA	Pld	W	D*	L	GF	GA
(United States) 1996	Did not enter								1995 FIFA WWC					
(Australia) 2000	Did not enter								1999 FIFA WWC					
(Greece) 2004	Did not qualify								2	0	0	2	2	33
(China) 2008	Did not enter								Did not enter					
(United Kingdom) 2012	Did not enter								Did not enter					
(Brazil) 2016	Did not enter								Did not enter					
(Japan) 2020	Did not enter								Did not enter					
(France) 2024	Did not qualify								2022 CONCACAF W Championship					
(United States) 2028	Did not qualify								2026 CONCACAF W Championship					
Total	–	–	–	–	–	–	–	–	2	0	0	2	2	33

*Draws include knockout matches decided on penalty kicks.

=== CONCACAF W Championship ===
CONCACAF W Championship record								Qualification record					
Year	Result	Pld	W	D*	L	GF	GA	Pld	W	D*	L	GF	GA
(Haiti) 1991	Did not enter							Did not enter					
(United States) 1993	Did not enter							Did not enter					
(Canada) 1994	Did not enter							Did not enter					
(Canada) 1998	Did not enter							Did not enter					
(United States) 2000	Did not enter							Did not enter					
(United States) (Canada) 2002	Did not enter							Did not enter					
(United States) 2006	Did not enter							Did not enter					
(Mexico) 2010	Did not qualify							2	0	0	2	1	14
(United States) 2014	Did not qualify							3	0	0	3	1	26
(United States) 2018	Did not enter							Did not enter					
(Mexico) 2022	Did not qualify							4	1	1	2	4	15
(United States) 2026	Did not qualify							4	2	0	2	5	15
Total	–	–	–	–	–	–	–	13	3	1	9	11	70

*Draws include knockout matches decided on penalty kicks.

=== Pan American Games ===
Pan American Games record
Year	Result	Pld	W	D*	L	GF	GA
(Canada) 1999	Did not enter						
(Dominican Republic) 2003	Did not enter						
(Brazil) 2007	Did not enter						
(Mexico) 2011	Did not qualify						
(Canada) 2015	Did not qualify						
(Peru) 2019	Did not enter						
(Chile) 2023	Did not qualify						
(Peru) 2027	Did not qualify						
Total	–	–	–	–	–	–	–

*Draws include knockout matches decided on penalty kicks.

=== Central American and Caribbean Games ===
Central American and Caribbean Games record
Year	Result	Pld	W	D*	L	GF	GA
(Puerto Rico) 2010	Did not enter						
(Mexico) 2014	Did not enter						
(Colombia) 2018	Did not enter						
(El Salvador) 2023	Did not enter						
Total	–	–	–	–	–	–	–

*Draws include knockout matches decided on penalty kicks.

=== Central American Games ===
Central American Games record
Year	Result	Pld	W	D*	L	GF	GA
(Guatemala) 2001	Group stage	2	0	0	2	0	18
(Honduras) 2005	Tournament Cancelled						
(Panama) 2009	Tournament Cancelled						
(Costa Rica) 2013	Group stage	3	0	0	3	1	25
(Nicaragua) 2017	Did not enter						
(El Salvador) 2022	Cancelled						
(Guatemala) 2025	Did not enter						
Total	Group stage	5	0	0	5	1	43

*Draws include knockout matches decided on penalty kicks.
