= Cuba women's national football team =

Women's national football team representing Cuba

Cuba
- Nickname: Las Leonas del Caribe (The Lionesses of the Caribbean)
- Association: Asociación de Fútbol de Cuba
- Confederation: CONCACAF
- Head coach: Elizabeth Cuff
- FIFA code: CUB
First colours	Second colours

FIFA ranking
- Current: 96 ▲1 (20 October 2026)
- Highest: 81 (December 2020)
- Lowest: 102 (November 2010)

First international
- Cuba 21–0 British Virgin Islands (Havana, Cuba; 3 October 2007)

Biggest win
- Cuba 21–0 British Virgin Islands (Havana, Cuba; 3 October 2007)

Biggest defeat
- Canada 12–0 Cuba (Edinburg, Texas, United States; 8 October 2018)

The Cuba women's national football team (Spanish: selección femenina de fútbol de Cuba) is the national women's football team of Cuba and is overseen by the Asociación de Fútbol de Cuba. In 2018, Cuba qualified for its first ever CONCACAF Women's Championship after finishing third in Caribbean Zone Qualifying.

== Coaching staff ==
- Updated on 22 March 2024 .

=== Current coaching staff ===
Position	Name	Ref.
Head coach	(Cuba) Elizabeth Cuff	
Assistant coach	Luis M Elejalde	
Goalkeeping coach	Odelin Molina	
Fitness coach	Joel Cabrera	

=== Manager history ===
- (Cuba) Edelsio Griego (????-????)
- (Cuba) Elizabeth Cuff (????-present)

== Results and fixtures ==
The following is a list of match results in the last 12 months, as well as any future matches that have been scheduled.

Legend

Win Draw Lose Fixture

=== 2025 ===
2 December 2025 2026 CONCACAF W Championship Q	Cuba	2–2	Saint Kitts and Nevis	Santiago de Cuba
15:00 UTC−5	Aldana 53', 71' (pen.)	Report (FIFA); Report (CONCACAF)	Browne 15'; Wanton 75' (o.g.)	Stadium: Estadio Antonio Maceo; Referee: Glenda López (Guatemala)

- Peru Results and Fixtures – Soccerway.com

== Players ==
Up-to-date caps, goals, and statistics are not publicly available; therefore, caps and goals listed may be incorrect.

=== Current squad ===
- The following players were named to the squad for the 2026 CONCACAF W Championship qualification match against Saint Kitts and Nevis on 2 December 2025.

No.	Pos.	Player	Date of birth (age)	Caps	Goals	Club
	GK	Alianne Matamoro Reyes	19 January 2000 (age 26)	4	0	(National Football Federation of Guatemala) Municipal
	GK	Lucylena Martínez	28 May 1991 (age 35)	13	0	(Football Association of Cuba) La Habana
	GK	Elika Acea				(Football Association of Cuba)
	DF	Katheryn Rodríguez	10 September 2002 (age 24)	5	4	(Nicaraguan Football Federation) UNAN Managua
	DF	Sheyla Wanton	28 November 2002 (age 23)	0	0	(Nicaraguan Football Federation) UNAN Managua
	DF	Yeranys Lee	24 March 1999 (age 27)	7	0	(Football Association of Cuba)
	DF	Laura Moreno	18 September 1993 (age 33)	8	1	(Football Association of Cuba) Villa Clara
	DF	Yaniuvis Suárez	31 March 2001 (age 25)	0	0	(Football Association of Cuba) Santiago de Cuba
	MF	Eliannes Valdés	19 July 2001 (age 25)	3	2	(Football Association of Cuba) Santiago de Cuba
	MF	María Álvarez	28 March 2000 (age 26)	3	0	(Football Association of Cuba) Santiago de Cuba
	MF	Eunises Núñez	24 January 2000 (age 26)	3	1	(Football Association of Cuba) La Habana
	MF	Nahomi Aguilar	24 June 1999 (age 27)	0	0	(Football Association of Cuba) La Habana
	MF	Gianna Borrego	7 October 2000 (age 26)			(Football Association of Cuba)
	MF	Sabrina Bahamonde				(Football Association of Cuba)
	MF	Lucy Amanda Brooks				(Football Association of Cuba)
	FW	Maristania Mengana	5 February 2000 (age 26)	7	1	(Football Association of Cuba) Santiago de Cuba
	FW	Cecil Aldana	17 September 2003 (age 23)	0	0	(Ecuadorian Football Federation) LDU Quito
	FW	Indira Hechevarría	19 December 2003 (age 22)			(Football Association of Cuba) Santiago de Cuba
	FW	Daimelys Regla Ribalta	4 November 2004 (age 22)			(Football Association of Cuba)
	FW	Delennis Acosta				(Football Association of Cuba)
	FW	Kennys Castellanos				(Football Association of Cuba)
	FW	Ana Josefa Fernández				(Football Association of Cuba)

=== Recent call ups ===
The following players have been called up in the past 12 months.

Pos.	Player	Date of birth (age)	Caps	Goals	Club	Latest call-up

== Competitive record ==
=== FIFA Women's World Cup ===
FIFA Women's World Cup record
Year	Result	Pld	W	D*	L	GF	GA
(China) 1991	Did not enter						
(Sweden) 1995	Did not enter						
(United States) 1999	Did not enter						
(United States) 2003	Did not enter						
(China) 2007	Did not enter						
(Germany) 2011	Did not qualify						
(Canada) 2015	Did not qualify						
(France) 2019	Did not qualify						
(Australia) (New Zealand) 2023	Did not qualify						
(Brazil) 2027	Did not qualify						
(Costa Rica) (Jamaica) (Mexico) (United States) 2031	To be determined						
(United Kingdom) 2035	To be determined						
Total	-	-	-	-	-	-	-

*Draws include knockout matches decided on penalty kicks.

=== Olympic Games ===
Summer Olympics record									Qualifying record					
Year	Round	Position	Pld	W	D*	L	GF	GA	Pld	W	D*	L	GF	GA
(United States) 1996	Did not enter								1995 FIFA WWC					
(Australia) 2000	Did not enter								1999 FIFA WWC					
(Greece) 2004	Did not enter								Did not enter					
(China) 2008	Did not qualify								5	3	0	2	37	4
(United Kingdom) 2012	Did not qualify								6	2	1	3	10	8
(Brazil) 2016	Did not qualify								2	1	1	0	7	1
(Japan) 2020	Did not qualify								4	3	0	1	19	14
(France) 2024	Did not qualify								4	2	1	1	17	6
(United States) 2028	Did not qualify								4	2	1	1	6	5
Total	-	-	-	-	-	-	-	-	25	13	4	8	96	38

*Draws include knockout matches decided on penalty kicks.

=== CONCACAF W Championship ===
CONCACAF W Championship record								Qualification record					
Year	Result	Pld	W	D*	L	GF	GA	Pld	W	D*	L	GF	GA
(Haiti) 1991	Did not enter							Did not enter					
(United States) 1993	Did not enter							Did not enter					
(Canada) 1994	Did not enter							Did not enter					
(Canada) 1998	Did not enter							Did not enter					
(United States) 2000	Did not enter							Did not enter					
(United States) (Canada) 2002	Did not enter							Did not enter					
(United States) 2006	Did not enter							Did not enter					
(Mexico) 2010	Did not qualify							5	3	0	2	12	10
(United States) 2014	Did not qualify							2014 Caribbean Cup					
(United States) 2018	Group stage	3	0	0	3	0	29	8	5	1	2	34	12
(Mexico) 2022	Did not qualify							4	2	1	1	17	6
(United States) 2026	Did not qualify							4	2	1	1	6	5
Total	Group stage	3	0	0	3	0	29	21	12	3	6	69	23

*Draws include knockout matches decided on penalty kicks.

=== CONCACAF W Gold Cup ===
CONCACAF W Gold Cup record								Qualification record							
Year	Result	GP	W	D*	L	GF	GA	Division	Group	GP	W	D*	L	GF	GA
(United States) 2024	Did not qualify							C	B	4	4	0	0	11	2
(N/A) 2029	To be determined							To be determined							
Total	–	–	–	–	–	–	–	–	–	4	4	0	0	11	2

*Draws include knockout matches decided on penalty kicks.

=== Pan American Games ===
Pan American Games record
Year	Result	Pld	W	D*	L	GF	GA
(Canada) 1999	Did not enter						
(Dominican Republic) 2003	Did not enter						
(Brazil) 2007	Did not enter						
(Mexico) 2011	Did not qualify						
(Canada) 2015	Did not qualify						
(Peru) 2019	Did not qualify						
(Chile) 2023	Did not qualify						
(Peru) 2027	Did not qualify						
Total	-	-	-	-	-	-	-

*Draws include knockout matches decided on penalty kicks.

=== Central American and Caribbean Games ===
Central American and Caribbean Games record
Year	Result	Pld	W	D*	L	GF	GA
(Puerto Rico) 2010	Did not enter						
(Mexico) 2014	Did not enter						
(Colombia) 2018	Did not enter						
(El Salvador) 2023	Did not enter						
Total	-	-	-	-	-	-	-

*Draws include knockout matches decided on penalty kicks.

=== CFU Women's Caribbean Cup ===
CFU Women's Caribbean Cup record
Year	Result	Pld	W	D*	L	GF	GA
(Haiti) 2000	Did not enter						
(Trinidad and Tobago) 2014	First round	2	1	0	1	2	1
(Jamaica) 2018	N/A	2	2	0	0	8	0
Total	First round	4	3	0	1	10	1

*Draws include knockout matches decided on penalty kicks.
