= Guadeloupe women's national football team =

National association football team

Guadeloupe
- Nickname(s): Les Gwada Girls (the Gwada Girls)
- Association: Ligue Guadeloupéenne de Football
- Confederation: CONCACAF (North America)
- Head coach: Jocelyn Angloma
- FIFA code: GLP
| First colours | Second colours | Third colours |

First international
- Guadeloupe 3–0 Martinique (Guadeloupe; 2000)

Biggest win
- Guadeloupe 4–0 Dominica (Saint-François, Guadeloupe; 2 July 2002)

Biggest defeat
- Guadeloupe 0–13 Jamaica (Port-au-Prince, Haiti; 9 May 2018)

Guadeloupe women's national football team (French: équipe de Guadeloupe féminine de football) is the regional team of Guadeloupe. They have only played in very few matches.

== History ==
The team did not play in any notable matches in 2008. Guadeloupe women's national football team participated in the 2000 Caribbean Women's Championships. In the first game at home on 30 April, they beat Martinique 3–0. On the return leg in Martinique on 21 May, they lost 1–5.

== Background ==
Ligue Guadeloupéenne de Football is the sport's governing association in the country but they are associated with Fédération Française de Football. In 2008, 28.7% of the sport participants in the country were women.

== Results and fixtures ==
- The following is a list of matches in the last 12 months, as well as any future matches that have been scheduled.

Win Draw Loss

== Coaching staff ==
=== Current personnel ===
As of 21 September 2023.

| Position | Name |
|---|---|
| Head coach | (France) Jocelyn Angloma |
| Assistant coaches | |
| Goalkeeping coach | |
| Fitness coach | |

== Players ==
=== Current squad ===
The following 24 players are named in the squad for the 2024 CONCACAF W Gold Cup qualification matches against Saint Lucia on 1 December 2023.

Caps and goals are correct as of 23 June 2021, after the match against Martinique.

| No. | Pos. | Player | Date of birth (age) | Caps | Goals | Club |
|---|---|---|---|---|---|---|
| | GK | Maina Morval | | 0 | 0 | (Ligue guadeloupéenne de football) Sporting Club |
| | GK | Célia Saint-auret | | 0 | 0 | (Ligue guadeloupéenne de football) Siroco |
| | DF | Cléhame Assard De Kemadec | | 0 | 0 | (Ligue guadeloupéenne de football) AS Dynamo |
| | DF | Léila Claire | | | | (Ligue guadeloupéenne de football) AS Dynamo |
| | DF | Cynly Dyvrande | | 0 | 0 | (Ligue guadeloupéenne de football) AS Dynamo |
| | DF | Sarane Gustraimac | | | | (Ligue guadeloupéenne de football) AS Dynamo |
| | DF | Cindy Tauliaut | | | | (Ligue guadeloupéenne de football) Siroco |
| | DF | Stacy Verdine | | | | (Ligue guadeloupéenne de football) Sporting Club |
| | DF | Mayra Bedminster | | | | (Ligue guadeloupéenne de football) Arsenal Club Petit-Bourg |
| | MF | Mallory Heynegen | | 0 | 0 | (Ligue guadeloupéenne de football) CSC |
| | MF | Chloé Miath | | | | Sporting Club |
| | MF | Keycha Monchador | | 0 | 0 | (Ligue guadeloupéenne de football) Sporting Club |
| | MF | Tahina Theophile | | 0 | 0 | (Ligue guadeloupéenne de football) Sporting Club |
| | MF | Kenza Valerie | | 0 | 0 | (Ligue guadeloupéenne de football) Siroco |
| | FW | Camilia Antonio | | | | AS Anonymous |
| | FW | Kiana Bordelais | | | | Sporting Club |
| | FW | Sydjalhia Garriba | | 0 | 0 | (Ligue guadeloupéenne de football) AS Dynamo |
| | FW | Précilia Lacemon | | | | AS Anonymous |
| | FW | Djimila Quilin | | | | Sporting Club |

=== Recent call-ups ===
The following players have also been called up to the squad in last 12 months.

| Pos. | Player | Date of birth (age) | Caps | Goals | Club | Latest call-up |

== Competitive record ==
=== CONCACAF W Championship ===
| CONCACAF W Championship record | | | | | | | | | Qualification record | | | | | |
| Year | Result | Position | Pld | W | D* | L | GF | GA | Pld | W | D* | L | GF | GA |
| (Haiti) 1991 | Did not enter | | | | | | | | Did not enter | | | | | |
| (United States) 1993 | Did not enter | | | | | | | | Did not enter | | | | | |
| (Canada) 1994 | Did not enter | | | | | | | | Did not enter | | | | | |
| (Canada) 1998 | Did not enter | | | | | | | | Did not enter | | | | | |
| (United States) 2000 | Did not enter | | | | | | | | Did not enter | | | | | |
| (Canada) (United States) 2002 | Did not enter | | | | | | | | Did not enter | | | | | |
| (United States) 2006 | Did not enter | | | | | | | | Did not enter | | | | | |
| (Mexico) 2010 | Did not enter | | | | | | | | Did not enter | | | | | |
| (United States) 2014 | Did not enter | | | | | | | | Did not enter | | | | | |
| (United States) 2018 | Did not qualify | | | | | | | | 3 | 0 | 0 | 3 | 0 | 27 |
| (Mexico) 2022 | Did not enter | | | | | | | | Did not enter | | | | | |
| (United States) 2026 | Did not enter | | | | | | | | Did not enter | | | | | |
| Total | 0/1 | 0 Titles | – | – | – | – | – | – | 3 | 0 | 0 | 3 | 0 | 27 |

*Draws include knockout matches decided by penalty kicks.

=== CONCACAF W Gold Cup qualifying ===
| CONCACAF W Gold Cup record | | | | | | | | Qualification record | | | | | | | |
| Year | Result | GP | W | D* | L | GF | GA | Division | Group | GP | W | D* | L | GF | GA |
|---|---|---|---|---|---|---|---|---|---|---|---|---|---|---|---|
| (United States) 2024 | Did not qualify | | | | | | | C | B | 4 | 0 | 0 | 4 | 2 | 15 |
| (N/A) 2029 | To be determined | | | | | | | To be determined | | | | | | | |
| Total | – | – | – | – | – | – | – | – | – | 4 | 0 | 0 | 4 | 2 | 15 |

*Draws include knockout matches decided on penalty kicks.

=== CFU Women's Caribbean Cup ===
CFU Women's Caribbean Cup record
| Year | Result | Pld | W | D* | L | GF | GA |
|---|---|---|---|---|---|---|---|
| (Haiti) 2000 | Preliminary | 2 | 1 | 0 | 1 | 3 | 5 |
| (Trinidad and Tobago) 2014 | Withdrew | | | | | | |
| (Trinidad and Tobago) 2018 | Third place | 2 | 0 | 0 | 2 | 2 | 6 |
| Total | Third place | 4 | 1 | 0 | 3 | 5 | 11 |

*Draws include knockout matches decided on penalty kicks.
