= CONCACAF Women's Olympic Qualifying Tournament =

Women's qualification - Summer Olympics

- Organizer(s): CONCACAF
- Founded: 2004
- Region: North America, Central America and the Caribbean
- Qualifier for: Summer Olympics
- Current champion: United States (5th title)
- Most championships: United States (5 titles)
- 2028 Olympic Qualifying

The CONCACAF Women's Olympic Qualifying Tournament was an international football (soccer) event in the North America, Central America and the Caribbean region, and was the qualification tournament for the Olympic Games.

Women's football tournaments in Olympics have been held since 1996, but the qualifying tournaments were held for the 2004 to 2020 Olympics, with the two finalists qualify for the Olympic tournament.

For the 2024 Summer Olympics, the winner of the 2022 CONCACAF W Championship will qualify for the 2024 tournament, while the second and third-placed teams will advance to a CONCACAF Olympic play-off, where the winner of the play-off will qualify for the Olympics.

== Results ==
Flags indicate the hosts for the final rounds of the respective tournaments.
(Q) indicates qualification to Olympics.

FIFA Women's World Cup as Olympic Qualifying
Olympics	World Cup	World Cup participants from CONCACAF		
(United States) 1996	(Sweden) 1995	United States (Q) (third place)	Canada (group stage)	N/A
(Australia) 2000	(United States) 1999	United States (Q) (winners)	Canada (group stage)	Mexico (group stage)

CONCACAF Women's Olympic Qualifying Tournament
Olympics	Qualifying	Final			Third place match		
Olympics	Qualifying	Winner	Score	Runner-up	3rd place	Score	4th place
(Greece) 2004	(Costa Rica) 2004	United States (Q)	3–2	Mexico (Q)	Canada	4–0	Costa Rica
(China) 2008	(Mexico) 2008	United States (Q)	1–1 (a.e.t.) (6–5 pen.)	Canada (Q)	Mexico	1–0	Costa Rica
(United Kingdom) 2012	(Canada) 2012	United States (Q)	4–0	Canada (Q)	Mexico and Costa Rica (no third place match)		
(Brazil) 2016	(United States) 2016	United States (Q)	2–0	Canada (Q)	Trinidad and Tobago and Costa Rica (no third place match)		
(Japan) 2020	(United States) 2020	United States (Q)	3–0	Canada (Q)	Costa Rica and Mexico (no third place match)		

CONCACAF W Championship as Olympic Qualifying
Olympics	CONCACAF W Championship	CONCACAF W Championship Final			CONCACAF Olympic play-off (runner-up vs third place)		
Olympics	CONCACAF W Championship	Champion	Score	Runner-up	Runner-up	Score	Third place
(France) 2024	(Mexico) 2022	United States (Q)	1–0	Canada	Canada	4-1	Jamaica
