= 2003 FIFA Women's World Cup qualification (CONCACAF–AFC play-off) =

- Event: 2003 FIFA Women's World Cup qualification
Mexico	Japan
(Mexico)	(Japan)
2	4
- on aggregate

First leg
Mexico	Japan
2	2
- Date: 5 July 2003
- Venue: Estadio Azteca, Mexico City
- Referee: Martha Toro Pardo (Colombia)
- Attendance: 75,000

Second leg
Japan	Mexico
2	0
- Date: 12 July 2003
- Venue: National Stadium, Tokyo
- Referee: Katriina Elovirta (Finland)
- Attendance: 12,743

The CONCACAF–AFC play-off of the 2003 FIFA Women's World Cup qualification competition was a two-legged home-and-away tie that decided one spot in the final tournament in the United States. The play-off was contested by the third-placed team from CONCACAF, Mexico, and the fourth-placed team from the AFC, Japan.

== Qualified teams ==
Confederation	Placement	Team
CONCACAF	2002 CONCACAF Women's Gold Cup 3rd place	Mexico
AFC	2003 AFC Women's Championship 4th place	Japan

== Summary ==
The draw for the order of legs was held at the FIFA headquarters in Zurich, Switzerland on 4 March 2003. The matches were originally scheduled to take place on 10 and 17 May 2003. However, due to the postponement of the 2003 FIFA Women's World Cup, the matches instead took place on 5 and 12 July 2003.

Team 1	Agg.	Team 2	1st leg	2nd leg
Mexico	2–4	Japan	2–2	0–2

== Matches ==
5 July 2003
12:00 UTC−5

Mexico	2–2	Japan
Mora 60'; Sandoval 76'	Report	Kobayashi 51'; Miyamoto 74'

Estadio Azteca, Mexico City
Attendance: 75,000
Referee: Martha Toro Pardo (Colombia)
12 July 2003
15:00 UTC+9

Japan	2–0	Mexico
Sawa 56'; Maruyama 83'	Report

National Stadium, Tokyo
Attendance: 12,743
Referee: Katriina Elovirta (Finland)

Japan won 4–2 on aggregate and qualified for the 2003 FIFA Women's World Cup.

== Goalscorers ==
There were 6 goals scored in 2 matches, for an average of 3 goals per match.

1 goal

- (Japan) Yayoi Kobayashi
- (Japan) Karina Maruyama
- (Japan) Tomomi Miyamoto
- (Japan) Homare Sawa
- (Mexico) Iris Mora
- (Mexico) Marlene Sandoval
