= Homare Sawa =

Japanese footballer (born 1978)

Homare Sawa 澤 穂希
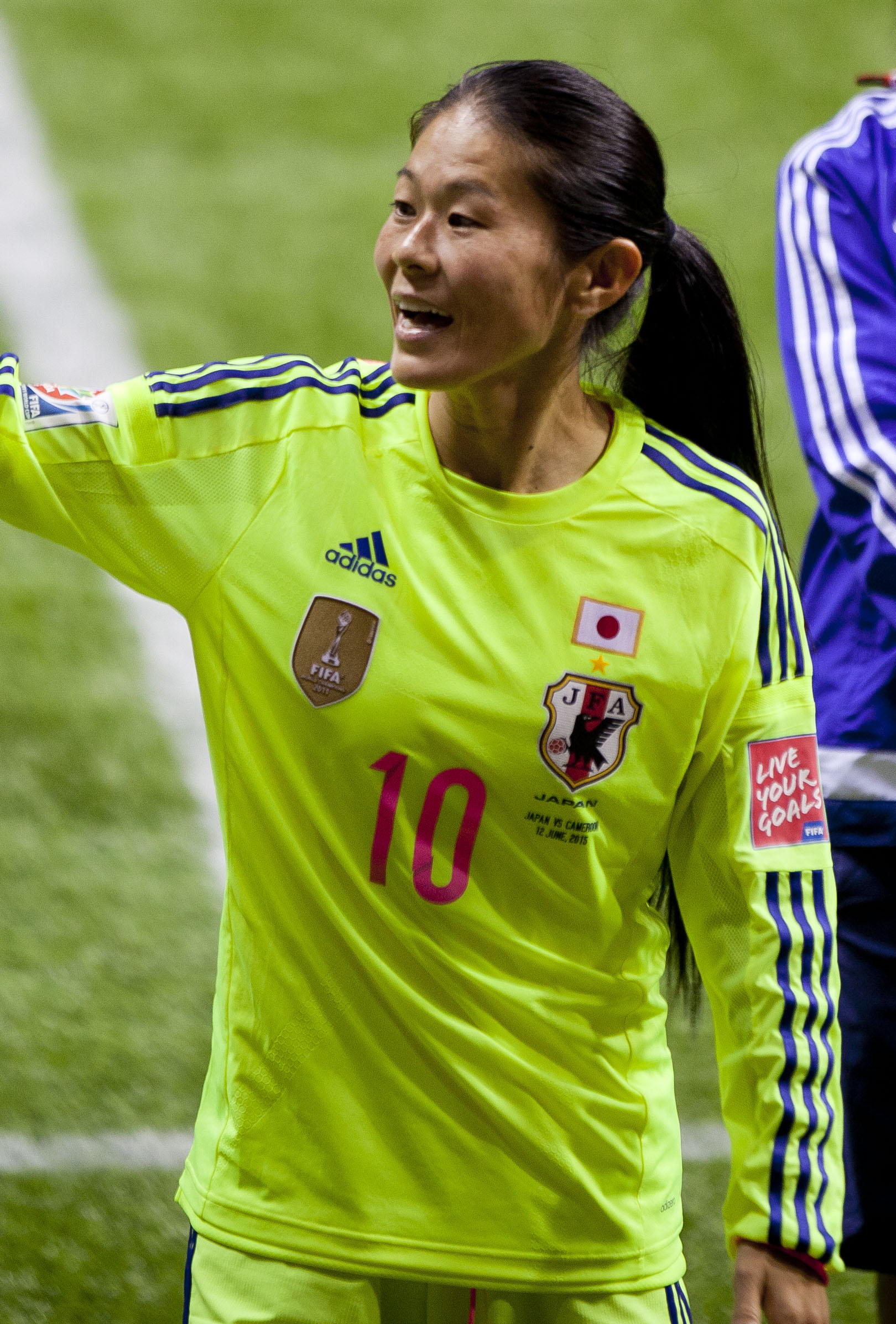
- Sawa at the 2015 World Cup

Personal information
- Full name: Homare Sawa
- Date of birth: 6 September 1978 (age 48)
- Place of birth: Fuchū, Tokyo, Japan
- Height: 1.65 m (5 ft 5 in)
- Position: Midfielder

Senior career*
Years	Team	Apps	(Gls)
1991–1999	NTV Beleza	136	(79)
1999–2000	Denver Diamonds		
2001–2003	Atlanta Beat	55	(13)
2004–2008	Nippon TV Beleza	85	(47)
2009–2010	Washington Freedom	41	(6)
2009	→ Nippon TV Beleza (loan)	4	(2)
2010	Nippon TV Beleza	0	(0)
2011–2015	INAC Kobe Leonessa	94	(12)
Total		415	(159)

International career
1993–2015	Japan	205	(83)
Medal record
Women's football
Representing Japan
Olympic Games
Silver medal – second place	2012 London	Team
FIFA Women's World Cup
Winner	2011 Germany
Runner-up	2015 Canada
AFC Women's Asian Cup
Winner	2014 Vietnam
Runner-up	1995 Malaysia
Runner-up	2001 Chinese Taipei
Bronze medal – third place	1993 Malaysia
Bronze medal – third place	1997 China
Bronze medal – third place	2008 Vietnam
Bronze medal – third place	2010 China
Asian Games
Gold medal – first place	2010 Guangzhou	Team
Silver medal – second place	1994 Hiroshima	Team
Silver medal – second place	2006 Doha	Team
Bronze medal – third place	1998 Bangkok	Team
Bronze medal – third place	2002 Busan	Team
- * Club domestic league appearances and goals

Homare Sawa (澤 穂希, Sawa Homare; born 6 September 1978) is a Japanese former professional footballer who played as a forward and midfielder. Her club career spanned 24 seasons, mostly with Nippon TV Beleza and INAC Kobe Leonessa. With Sawa as captain, the Japan national team won the 2011 FIFA Women's World Cup, with Sawa receiving both the Golden Ball and Golden Boot. Regarded as one of Japan's greatest ever female footballers, Sawa was named the 2011 FIFA Women's World Player of the Year, becoming the first Asian person of any gender to receive a major year-end individual football award. She also led Japan to the silver medal at the 2012 Summer Olympics.

Sawa made her club debut in 1991 at the age of 12, and went on to win five titles with Nippon TV Beleza between 1991 and 1999 before leaving for the United States to play in the Women's United Soccer Association (WUSA). She played for two WUSA clubs, the Atlanta Beat and the Denver Diamonds, before returning to the Japanese league in 2004. Within four years, Sawa won another nine titles with NTV Beleza. In 2008, Japan reached their first Olympic medal match at the Summer Olympics, with Sawa finishing as Japan's top scorer of the tournament. In 2015, Sawa led Japan to their second-ever Women's World Cup final.

Sawa retired after winning the 2015 Empress's Cup with INAC Kobe Leonessa. She finished her career with 11 league titles and 8 domestic cup titles in the Japanese League, and was also named to the league's Best XI for 11 seasons. Sawa remains the leader in both appearances and goals for the Japan national team, with 205 and 83 respectively.

== Early life ==
Sawa was born in Fuchū, Tokyo on 6 September 1978. She began playing football at the age of six. While watching her older brother train, she was invited by his coach to join the boys' team.

== Club career ==
=== Nippon TV Beleza ===
In 1991, Sawa was promoted to Yomiuri Beleza (later Nippon TV Beleza) from her youth team by manager Kazuhiko Takemoto. She made her debut in L.League, Japan's highest domestic league, at the age of 12. She played as a forward and appeared in 136 league matches, scoring 79 goals. She was named to the Best Eleven five times between 1993 and 1998. In 1999, NTV Beleza cancelled Sawa's contract, and she left to play football in the United States.

=== Atlanta Beat ===
With the launch of the Women's United Soccer Association (WUSA) in 2001, Sawa found herself playing in the highest-level professional women's league in the United States, for the Atlanta Beat. With Asian compatriot Sun Wen in the team, she scored the first goal in the club's history, and was a centerpiece of the Beat's three seasons in the league, helping them into the playoffs each year. Despite her diminutive stature at 5 ft 5 in (165 cm) tall and 121 pounds (55 kg), she held her own with the mostly larger and more physical players, and was regularly among the team and league leaders in fouls taken.

=== Nippon TV Beleza ===
Following the WUSA's demise in 2003, Sawa returned to Japan, where she played with powerhouse Nippon TV Beleza. In 2004, she was named Women's Player of the Year for the Asian Football Confederation. She played the club until 2008. The club won L.League championship for four years in a row (2005–2008). She also was selected L.League MVP awards in 2006 and 2008.

=== Washington Freedom ===
On 24 September 2008, Sawa was selected by the Washington Freedom in the first round of the 2008 WPS International Draft. She was a fixture in the Freedom midfield through the league's first two seasons in 2009 and 2010.

=== Nippon TV Beleza and INAC Kobe Leonessa ===
Sawa returned to Japan temporarily at the end of the 2009 Women's Professional Soccer season, and joined Nippon TV Beleza on loan. At the end of 2010 Women's Professional Soccer season, she returned to Nippon TV Beleza.

In January 2011, Sawa moved to INAC Kobe Leonessa due to financial strain at Nippon TV Beleza, with international players; Shinobu Ohno, Yukari Kinga, and Chiaki Minamiyama. The club won the L.League championship three years in a row (2011–2013). On 16 December 2015, she announced her intent to retire at the end of the 2015 season. At the 2015 Empress's Cup, Sawa's final tournament as a player, INAC Kobe Leonessa reached the final. In the final against Albirex Niigata on 27 December, she scored the lone goal of the match in the 78th minute to secure the championship for her side.

== International career ==
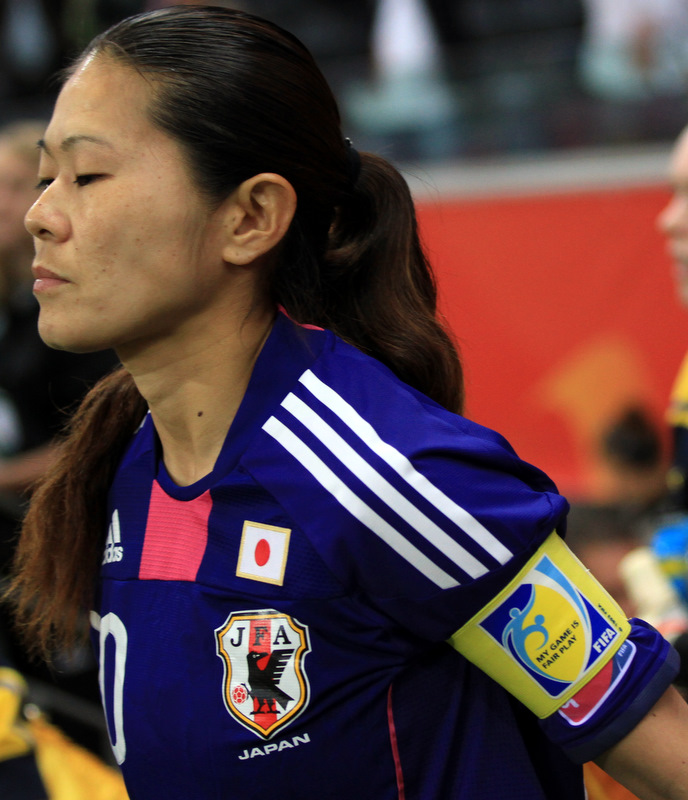
Sawa captaining Japan in the 2011 World Cup

On 6 December 1993, at age 15, Sawa made her Japanese international debut, scoring four goals in her first ever match, a win against the Philippines. Sawa debuted in her first Women's World Cup tournament in 1995, making her first start at 16 years old against Germany.

On 12 July 2003, Sawa scored the tie-winning goal against Mexico in 2003 Women's World Cup qualification play-offs to secure Japan's participation in the 2003 FIFA Women's World Cup.

Sawa played in all of Japan's matches at the 2004 Olympics, leading them to the knockout round of a major international tournament for the first time in Japan's history.

Sawa scored a hat trick in a 2011 World Cup group stage match against Mexico, becoming the then-oldest player in World Cup history to score a hat trick. Sawa led the Japanese national team as captain to a world championship victory at the 2011 World Cup . After a 2–2 tie in front of a sellout crowd in Frankfurt, Germany (with one goal by Sawa in the 117th minute), Japan won the penalty shootout 3–1, defeating the United States to win their first ever World Cup. Sawa was awarded the Golden Boot for being the tournament's leading scorer with five goals and the Golden Ball for being the tournament's MVP.

On 9 January 2012, Sawa was awarded the FIFA Women's World Player of the Year in Zurich, Switzerland. She broke Marta's streak of 5 consecutive FIFA Women's World Player of the Year awards, and also became the first Asian person regardless of gender to receive a major individual year-end award. In February of that year, Aya Miyama took over the captaincy of Japan from Sawa.

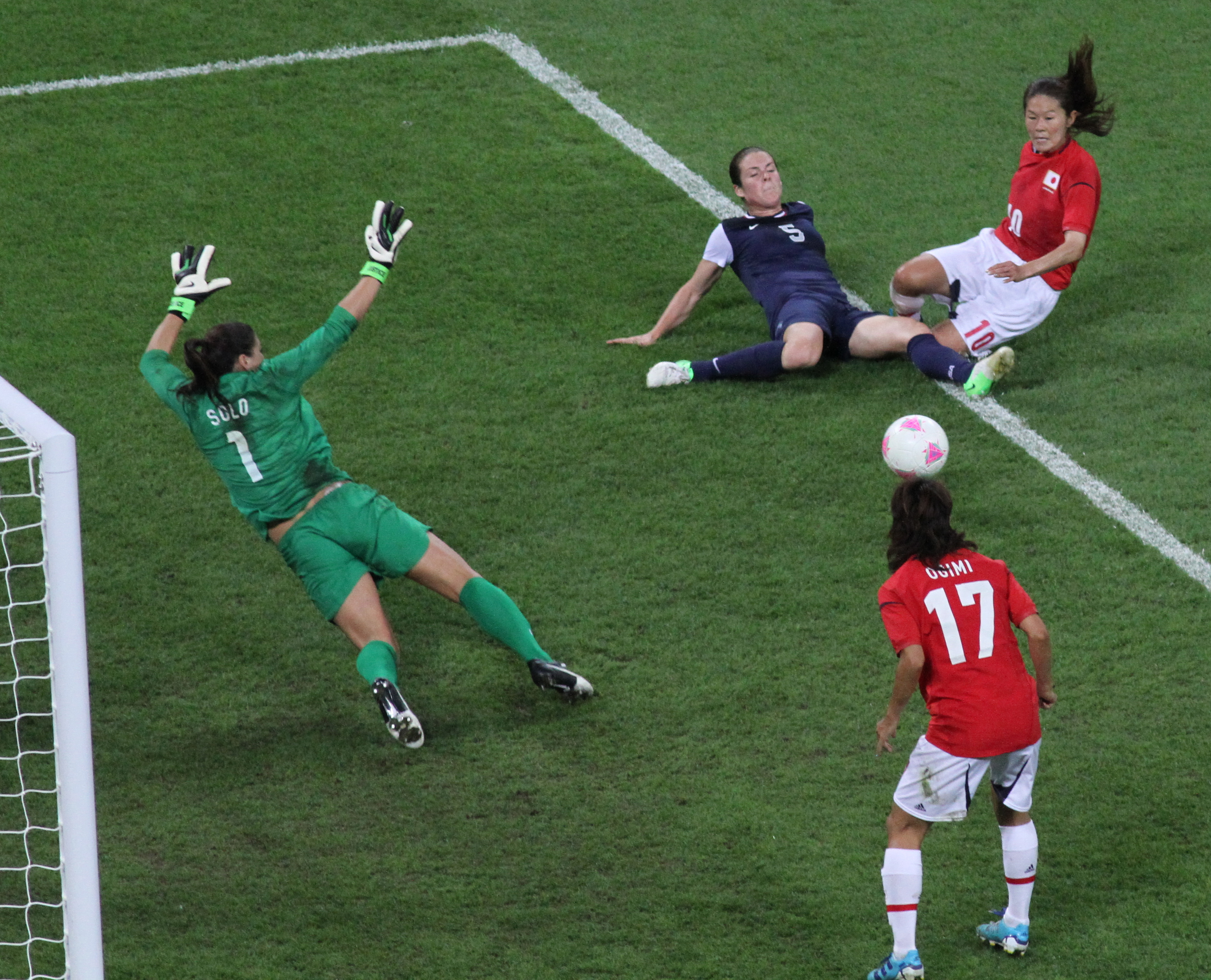
Yuki Ogimi (17) scores for Japan against the United States off a pass from Homare Sawa (10) as Kelley O'Hara (5) defends and Hope Solo (1) attempts to save.

At the 2012 London Olympics, Japan met the United States in the gold medal match where they were defeated 2–1. She announced her immediate retirement from international football in August 2012. In October 2012, she was shortlisted for the 2012 FIFA Women's World Player of the Year, where she finished 4th place in the voting.

Sawa returned to international competition in 2014 at the 2014 AFC Women's Asian Cup, which served as qualifiers to the 2015 FIFA Women's World Cup. Sawa scored Japan's opening goal in the semifinal against China, helping Japan win 2–1 to send them to the final. Japan went on to win the final 1–0 against Australia, claiming their first ever Asian Cup title.

Sawa was absent for many months after Japan's Asian Cup win, coinciding with multiple injuries. In November 2014, Sawa was a member of the first round of inductees into the Asian Football Hall of Fame. In March 2015, Norio Sasaki left Sawa out of Japan's squad for the 2015 Algarve Cup despite her being injury-free. Her exclusion from the Algarve Cup squad presented speculation that she would not be named to Japan's World Cup roster, as the Algarve Cup was typically used as warm-up matches for major international competitions.

To some surprise, Sawa was called into Japan's 2015 FIFA Women's World Cup squad after not featuring for Japan for the second half of 2014 or the early months of 2015. She did not regain her captaincy, however, which was still held by Aya Miyama. She returned to the national team from injury after a one-year absence, marking the occasion by scoring Japan's match-winning goal in a friendly against New Zealand. On 8 June, she started Japan's first match of the 2015 Women's World Cup, achieving her 200th cap with 57 minutes against Switzerland. Sawa and Brazil's Formiga became the first footballers to appear for a record sixth World Cup. (Note: This record was held until Formiga participated in her seventh World Cup in 2019.) Sawa had an off-the-bench role for the remainder of the tournament, starting just twice in seven games. Japan went on to advance to the final against the United States, where Sawa was subbed into the match in the 33rd minute after Japan had already conceded four goals. Japan went on to lose 5–2 to the U.S. in the final in what would end up being Sawa's last ever match with the Nadeshiko.

On 16 December 2015, Sawa announced her retirement from football after the completion of the 2015 Nadeshiko League season. Sawa's retirement was met with tributes from people across Japanese football, including coach Norio Sasaki, teammates Yuki Nagasato, Eriko Arakawa, and Azusa Iwashimizu, and male footballing compatriot Shunsuke Nakamura.

== Career statistics ==
=== Club ===
As of 11 November 2012

Appearances and goals by club, season and competition
Club	Season	League		National cup		League cup		Other		Total	
Club	Season	Apps	Goals	Apps	Goals	Apps	Goals	Apps	Goals	Apps	Goals
Yomiuri Beleza	1991	13	5			—		—			
Yomiuri Beleza	1992	20	3			—		—			
Yomiuri Beleza	1993	17	5			—		—			
Yomiuri Beleza	1994	17	11			—		—			
Yomiuri Beleza	1995	18	16			—		—			
Yomiuri Beleza	1996	17	14			—		—			
Yomiuri Beleza	1997	18	14			—		—			
Yomiuri Beleza	1998	16	11			—		—			
Yomiuri Beleza	1999	0	0			—		—			
Yomiuri Beleza	Total	136	79			0	0	0	0		
Denver Diamonds	1999							—			
Denver Diamonds	2000							—			
Denver Diamonds	Total										
Atlanta Beat	2001	19	3	—		—		—		19	3
Atlanta Beat	2002	21	7	—		—		—		21	7
Atlanta Beat	2003	15	3	—		—		—		15	3
Atlanta Beat	Total	55	13	0	0	0	0	0	0	55	13
Nippon TV Beleza	2004	6	5			—		—			
Nippon TV Beleza	2005	21	16	5	3	—		—		26	19
Nippon TV Beleza	2006	17	13	3	2	—		—		20	15
Nippon TV Beleza	2007	20	6	4	5	2	0	—		26	11
Nippon TV Beleza	2008	21	7	4	1	—		—		25	8
Nippon TV Beleza	Total	85	47			2	0	0	0		
Washington Freedom	2009	20	3	—		—		1 (Note: Appearance in play-offs)	0	20	3
Washington Freedom	2010	21	3	—		—		—		21	3
Washington Freedom	Total	41	6	0	0	0	0	1	0	41	6
Nippon TV Beleza (loan)	2009	4	2	4	1	—		—		8	3
Nippon TV Beleza	2010	—		1	0	—		—		1	0
INAC Kobe Leonessa	2011	16	4	4	0	—		—		20	4
INAC Kobe Leonessa	2012	17	2	3	0	4	0	—		24	2
INAC Kobe Leonessa	2013					6	0	—			
INAC Kobe Leonessa	Total	33	6	7	0	10	0	0	0	50	6
Career total											

=== International ===
Appearances and goals by national team and year
National team	Year	Apps	Goals
Japan	1993	4	4
Japan	1994	6	1
Japan	1995	8	0
Japan	1996	10	3
Japan	1997	7	13
Japan	1998	10	4
Japan	1999	8	0
Japan	2000	1	1
Japan	2001	8	6
Japan	2002	8	5
Japan	2003	12	10
Japan	2004	8	2
Japan	2005	9	3
Japan	2006	17	7
Japan	2007	14	6
Japan	2008	15	7
Japan	2009	1	0
Japan	2010	15	3
Japan	2011	14	5
Japan	2012	10	1
Japan	2013	2	0
Japan	2014	8	1
Japan	2015	8	1
Total		205	83

Scores and results list Japan's goal tally first, score column indicates score after each Sawa goal.

List of international goals scored by Homare Sawa
No.	Date	Venue	Opponent	Score	Result	Competition
1	6 December 1993	Sarawak State Stadium, Kuching, Malaysia	Philippines	Unknown	15–0	1993 AFC Women's Championship
2	6 December 1993	Sarawak State Stadium, Kuching, Malaysia	Philippines	Unknown	15–0	1993 AFC Women's Championship
3	6 December 1993	Sarawak State Stadium, Kuching, Malaysia	Philippines	Unknown	15–0	1993 AFC Women's Championship
4	6 December 1993	Sarawak State Stadium, Kuching, Malaysia	Philippines	Unknown	15–0	1993 AFC Women's Championship
5	20 August 1994	Slovakia	Slovakia	Unknown	2–2	Slovakia international Women's Cup
6	10 July 1996	Fort Lauderdale, United States	Australia	Unknown	2–2	Friendly
7	10 July 1996	Fort Lauderdale, United States	Australia	Unknown	2–2	Friendly
8	15 July 1996	Fort Lauderdale, United States	Sweden	Unknown	1–3	Friendly
9	5 December 1997	Guangzhou, China	Guam	Unknown	21–0	1997 AFC Women's Championship
10	5 December 1997	Guangzhou, China	Guam	Unknown	21–0	1997 AFC Women's Championship
11	5 December 1997	Guangzhou, China	Guam	Unknown	21–0	1997 AFC Women's Championship
12	5 December 1997	Guangzhou, China	Guam	Unknown	21–0	1997 AFC Women's Championship
13	5 December 1997	Guangzhou, China	Guam	Unknown	21–0	1997 AFC Women's Championship
14	5 December 1997	Guangzhou, China	Guam	Unknown	21–0	1997 AFC Women's Championship
15	5 December 1997	Guangzhou, China	Guam	Unknown	21–0	1997 AFC Women's Championship
16	7 December 1997	Guangzhou, China	India	1–0	1–0	1997 AFC Women's Championship
17	9 December 1997	Guangzhou, China	Hong Kong	Unknown	9–0	1997 AFC Women's Championship
18	9 December 1997	Guangzhou, China	Hong Kong	Unknown	9–0	1997 AFC Women's Championship
19	9 December 1997	Guangzhou, China	Hong Kong	Unknown	9–0	1997 AFC Women's Championship
20	14 December 1997	Guangzhou, China	Chinese Taipei	1–0	2–0	1997 AFC Women's Championship
21	14 December 1997	Guangzhou, China	Chinese Taipei	2–0	2–0	1997 AFC Women's Championship
22	8 December 1998	Bangkok, Thailand	Thailand	Unknown	6–0	Football at the 1998 Asian Games
23	12 December 1998	Bangkok, Thailand	Vietnam	Unknown	8–0	Football at the 1998 Asian Games
24	12 December 1998	Bangkok, Thailand	Vietnam	Unknown	8–0	Football at the 1998 Asian Games
25	12 December 1998	Bangkok, Thailand	Vietnam	Unknown	8–0	Football at the 1998 Asian Games
26	17 December 2000	Phoenix, United States	United States	1–1	1–1	Friendly
27	4 December 2001	Taipei, Taiwan	Singapore	Unknown	14–0	2001 AFC Women's Championship
28	4 December 2001	Taipei, Taiwan	Singapore	Unknown	14–0	2001 AFC Women's Championship
29	4 December 2001	Taipei, Taiwan	Singapore	Unknown	14–0	2001 AFC Women's Championship
30	4 December 2001	Taipei, Taiwan	Singapore	Unknown	14–0	2001 AFC Women's Championship
31	8 December 2001	Taipei, Taiwan	Guam	Unknown	11–0	2001 AFC Women's Championship
32	8 December 2001	Taipei, Taiwan	Guam	Unknown	11–0	2001 AFC Women's Championship
33	9 April 2002	Poitiers, France	Canada	2–1	3–2	Friendly
34	9 April 2002	Poitiers, France	Canada	3–1	3–2	Friendly
35	4 October 2002	Changwon, South Korea	Vietnam	3–0	3–0	Football at the 2002 Asian Games
36	7 October 2002	Masan, South Korea	South Korea	1–0	1–0	Football at the 2002 Asian Games
37	9 October 2002	Changwon, South Korea	China	2–0	2–2	Football at the 2002 Asian Games
38	9 June 2003	Rajamangala Stadium, Bangkok, Thailand	Philippines	7–0	15–0	2003 AFC Women's Championship
39	11 June 2003	Rajamangala Stadium, Bangkok, Thailand	Guam	Unknown	7–0	2003 AFC Women's Championship
40	11 June 2003	Rajamangala Stadium, Bangkok, Thailand	Guam	Unknown	7–0	2003 AFC Women's Championship
41	13 June 2003	Rajamangala Stadium, Bangkok, Thailand	Myanmar	Unknown	7–0	2003 AFC Women's Championship
42	15 June 2003	Rajamangala Stadium, Bangkok, Thailand	Chinese Taipei	Unknown	5–0	2003 AFC Women's Championship
43	15 June 2003	Rajamangala Stadium, Bangkok, Thailand	Chinese Taipei	Unknown	5–0	2003 AFC Women's Championship
44	12 July 2003	National Stadium, Tokyo, Japan	Mexico	1–0	2–0	2003 FIFA Women's World Cup qualification Play-offs
45	20 September 2003	Columbus Crew Stadium, Columbus, United States	Argentina	1–0	6–0	2003 FIFA Women's World Cup
46	20 September 2003	Columbus Crew Stadium, Columbus, United States	Argentina	2–0	6–0	2003 FIFA Women's World Cup
47	27 September 2003	Gillette Stadium, Boston, United States	Canada	1–0	1–3	2003 FIFA Women's World Cup
48	18 April 2004	National Stadium, Tokyo, Japan	Vietnam	Unknown	7–0	Football at the 2004 Summer Olympics qualification
49	18 December 2004	Nishigaoka Stadium, Tokyo, Japan	Chinese Taipei	6–0	11–0	Kirin Challenge Cup
50	21 May 2005	Nishigaoka Stadium, Tokyo, Japan	New Zealand	1–0	6–0	Kirin Challenge Cup
51	21 May 2005	Nishigaoka Stadium, Tokyo, Japan	New Zealand	3–0	6–0	Kirin Challenge Cup
52	28 May 2005	Russia	Russia	Unknown	2–0	Friendly
53	10 March 2006	Italy	Scotland	Unknown	4–0	Friendly
54	19 July 2006	Hindmarsh Stadium, Adelaide, Australia	Vietnam	1–0	5–0	2006 AFC Women's Asian Cup
55	19 July 2006	Hindmarsh Stadium, Adelaide, Australia	Vietnam	2–0	5–0	2006 AFC Women's Asian Cup
56	19 July 2006	Hindmarsh Stadium, Adelaide, Australia	Chinese Taipei	4–1	11–1	2006 AFC Women's Asian Cup
57	19 July 2006	Hindmarsh Stadium, Adelaide, Australia	Chinese Taipei	9–1	11–1	2006 AFC Women's Asian Cup
58	30 November 2006	Grand Hamad Stadium, Doha, Qatar	Jordan	10–0	13–0	Football at the 2006 Asian Games
59	30 November 2006	Grand Hamad Stadium, Doha, Qatar	Jordan	13–0	13–0	Football at the 2006 Asian Games
60	10 March 2007	National Stadium, Tokyo, Japan	Mexico	1–0	2–0	2007 FIFA Women's World Cup qualification Play-off
61	7 April 2007	Tokyo, Japan	Vietnam	1–0	2–0	Football at the 2008 Summer Olympics qualification
62	15 April 2007	Thailand	Thailand	1–0	4–0	Football at the 2008 Summer Olympics qualification
63	3 June 2007	Tokyo, Japan	South Korea	6–0	6–1	Football at the 2008 Summer Olympics qualification
64	4 August 2007	Vietnam	Vietnam	7–0	8–0	Football at the 2008 Summer Olympics qualification
65	12 August 2007	Tokyo, Japan	Thailand	1–0	5–0	Football at the 2008 Summer Olympics qualification
66	18 February 2008	Chongqing, China	North Korea	3–2	3–2	2008 EAFF Women's Football Championship
67	5 July 2008	Thống Nhất Stadium, Ho Chi Minh City, Vietnam	China	1–0	1–3	2008 AFC Women's Asian Cup
68	8 July 2008	Thống Nhất Stadium, Ho Chi Minh City, Vietnam	Australia	3–0	3–0	2008 AFC Women's Asian Cup
69	24 July 2008	Kobe, Japan	Australia	Unknown	3–0	Friendly
70	6 August 2008	Qinhuangdao Olympic Sports Center Stadium, Qinhuangdao, China	New Zealand	2–2	2–2	2008 Summer Olympics
71	12 August 2008	Shanghai Stadium, Shanghai, China	Norway	4–1	5–1	2008 Summer Olympics
72	15 August 2008	Qinhuangdao Olympic Sports Center Stadium, Qinhuangdao, China	China	1–0	2–0	2008 Summer Olympics
73	20 May 2010	Chengdu Sports Centre, Chengdu, China	Myanmar	2–0	8–0	2010 AFC Women's Asian Cup
74	20 May 2010	Chengdu Sports Centre, Chengdu, China	Myanmar	7–0	8–0	2010 AFC Women's Asian Cup
75	30 May 2010	Chengdu Sports Centre, Chengdu, China	China	2–0	2–0	2010 AFC Women's Asian Cup
76	1 July 2011	BayArena, Leverkusen, Germany	Mexico	1–0	4–0	2011 FIFA Women's World Cup
77	1 July 2011	BayArena, Leverkusen, Germany	Mexico	3–0	4–0	2011 FIFA Women's World Cup
78	1 July 2011	BayArena, Leverkusen, Germany	Mexico	4–0	4–0	2011 FIFA Women's World Cup
79	13 July 2011	Commerzbank-Arena, Frankfurt, Germany	Sweden	2–1	3–1	2011 FIFA Women's World Cup
80	17 July 2011	Commerzbank-Arena, Frankfurt, Germany	United States	2–2	2–2 (3–1 p.s.o)	2011 FIFA Women's World Cup
81	11 July 2012	National Stadium, Tokyo, Japan	Australia	3–0	3–0	Friendly (Kirin Challenge Cup 2012)
82	22 May 2014	Thống Nhất Stadium, Ho Chi Minh City, Vietnam	China	1–0	2–1	2014 AFC Women's Asian Cup
83	24 May 2015	Kagawa Marugame Stadium, Kagawa, Japan	New Zealand	1–0	1–0	Friendly (MS&AD Nadeshiko Cup 2015)

=== Matches and goals scored at World Cup and Olympic tournaments ===
Sawa has competed in six FIFA Women's World Cups (Sweden 1995, USA 1999, USA 2003, China 2007, Germany 2011, and Canada 2015); she and Brazil's Formiga, who competed at the same Women's World Cups, are the only players of either sex to appear in six World Cup final tournaments. Sawa has also represented Japan in four Olympics: Atlanta 1996, Athens 2004, Beijing 2008 and London 2012. In all, she played 41 matches and scored 11 goals at those ten global tournaments. Sawa was a member of the Japanese teams that won the 2011 Women's World Cup, and were runners-up at the 2012 Summer Olympics and 2015 Women's World Cup.

Key (expand for notes on "world cup and olympic goals")
Location	Geographic location of the venue where the competition occurred
Lineup	Start – played entire match on minute (off player) – substituted on at the minute indicated, and player was substituted off at the same time off minute (on player) – substituted off at the minute indicated, and player was substituted on at the same time (c) – captain
Min	The minute in the match the goal was scored. For list that include caps, blank indicates played in the match but did not score a goal.
Assist/pass	The ball was passed by the player, which assisted in scoring the goal. This column depends on the availability and source of this information.
penalty or pk	Goal scored on penalty-kick which was awarded due to foul by opponent. (Goals scored in penalty-shoot-out, at the end of a tied match after extra-time, are not included.)
Score	The match score after the goal was scored.
Result	The final score. W – match was won L – match was lost to opponent D – match was drawn (W) – penalty-shoot-out was won after a drawn match (L) – penalty-shoot-out was lost after a drawn match
aet	The score at the end of extra-time; the match was tied at the end of 90' regulation
pso	Penalty-shoot-out score shown in parentheses; the match was tied at the end of extra-time
	Pink background color – Olympic women's football tournament
	Blue background color – FIFA women's world cup final tournament

Goal	Match	Date	Location	Opponent	Lineup	Min	Score	Result	Competition
Sweden 1995 FIFA Women's World Cup
	1	1995-06-05	Karlstad	Germany	Start			0–1 L	Group stage
	2	1995-06-07	Karlstad	Brazil	Start			2–1 W	Group stage
	3	1995-06-09	Västerås	Sweden	off 76' (on Etsuko Handa)			0–2 L	Group stage
(United States) Atlanta 1996 Women's Olympic Football Tournament
	4	1996-07-21	Birmingham, AL	Germany	Start			2–3 L	Group stage
	5	1996-07-23	Birmingham, AL	Brazil	Start			0–2 L	Group stage
	6	1996-07-25	Washington, D.C.	Norway	Start			0–4 L	Group stage
(United States) USA 1999 FIFA Women's World Cup
	7	1999-06-19	San Jose, CA	Canada	Start			1–1 D	Group stage
	8	1999-06-23	Portland, OR	Russia	Start			0–5 L	Group stage
	9	1999-06-26	Chicago	Norway	Start			0–4 L	Group stage
(United States) USA 2003 FIFA Women's World Cup
1	10	2003-09-20 (Note: "FIFA Women's World Cup: USA 2003: MATCH Report: Japan – Argentina". FIFA.)	Columbus, OH	Argentina	off 80' (on Maruyama)	13	1–0	6–0 W	Group stage
2	10	2003-09-20	Columbus, OH	Argentina	off 80' (on Maruyama)	39	2–0	6–0 W	Group stage
	11	2003-09-24 (Note: "FIFA Women's World Cup: USA 2003: MATCH Report: Germany – Japan". FIFA.)	Columbus, OH	Germany	Start			0–3 L	Group stage
3	12	2003-09-27	Foxboro, MA	Canada	Start	20	1–0	1–3 L	Group stage
(Greece) Athens 2004 Women's Olympic Football Tournament
	13	2004-08-11	Volos	Sweden	Start			1–0 W	Group stage
	14	2004-08-14	Piraeus	Nigeria	Start			0–1 L	Group stage
	15	2004-08-20	Thessaloniki	United States	Start			1–2 L	Quarter-final
China 2007 FIFA Women's World Cup
	16	2007-09-11	Shanghai	England	Start			2–2 D	Group stage
	17	2007-09-14	Shanghai	Argentina	Start			1–0 W	Group stage
	18	2007-09-17	Hangzhou	Germany	Start			0–2 L	Group stage
(China) Beijing 2008 Women's Olympic Football Tournament
4	19	2008-08-06	Qinhuangdao	New Zealand	Start; (c)	86	2–2	2–2 D	Group stage
	20	2008-08-09	Qinhuangdao	United States	Start			0–1 L	Group stage
5	21	2008-08-12	Shanghai	Norway	Start	70	4–1	5–1 W	Group stage
6	22	2008-08-15	Qinhuangdao	China	Start	15	1–0	2–0 W	Quarter-final
	23	2008-08-18	Beijing	United States	Start			2–4 L	Semifinal
	24	2008-08-21	Beijing	Germany	Start			0–2 L	Bronze medal match
Germany 2011 FIFA Women's World Cup
	25	2011-06-27	Bochum	New Zealand	Start; (c)			2–1 W	Group stage
7	26	2011-07-01	Leverkusen	Mexico	off 83' (on Utsugi); (c)	13	1–0	4–0 W	Group stage
8	26	2011-07-01	Leverkusen	Mexico	off 83' (on Utsugi); (c)	39	3–0	4–0 W	Group stage
9	26	2011-07-01	Leverkusen	Mexico	off 83' (on Utsugi); (c)	80	4–0	4–0 W	Group stage
	27	2011-07-05	Augsburg	England	Start; (c)			0–2 L	Group stage
	28	2011-07-09	Wolfsburg	Germany	Start; (c)			1–0 aet W	Quarter-final
10	29	2011-07-13	Frankfurt	Sweden	Start; (c)	60	2–1	3–1 W	Semifinal
11	30	2011-07-17	Frankfurt	United States	Start; (c)	117	2–2	2–2 (pso 3–1) (W)	Final
(United Kingdom) London 2012 Women's Olympic Football Tournament
	31	2012-07-25	Coventry	Canada	Start			2–1 W	Group stage
	32	2012-07-28	Coventry	Sweden	off 59' (on Tanaka)			0–0 D	Group stage
	33	2012-08-03	Cardiff	Brazil	Start			2–0 W	Quarter-final
	34	2012-08-06	London	France	Start			2–1 W	Semifinal
	35	2012-08-09	London	United States	Start			1–2 L	Gold medal match
Canada 2015 FIFA Women's World Cup
	36	2015-06-08	Vancouver	Switzerland	off 57' (on Kawamura)			1–0 W	Group stage
	37	2015-06-12	Vancouver	Cameroon	on 64' (off Sakaguchi)			2–1 W	Group stage
	38	2015-06-16	Winnipeg	Ecuador	Start			2–1 W	Group stage
	39	2015-06-16	Vancouver	Netherlands	on 80' (off Kawasumi)			1–0 W	Round of 16
	40	2015-06-27	Edmonton	Australia	on 90' (off Sakaguchi)			2–1 W	Quarter-final
	41	2015-07-05	Vancouver	United States	on 33' (off Iwashimizu)			2–5 L	Final

== Honors ==
Yomiuri/Nippon TV Beleza

- Nadeshiko.League (8): 1991, 1992, 1993, 2005, 2006, 2007, 2008, 2010
- Empress's Cup All-Japan Women's Football Tournament (7): 1993, 1997, 2004, 2005, 2007, 2008, 2009
- Nadeshiko League Cup: 2007

INAC Kobe Leonessa

- Nadeshiko.League: 2011, 2012, 2013
- Empress's Cup All-Japan Women's Football Tournament: 2011
- International Women's Club Championship: 2013
- Nadeshiko League Cup: 2013

Japan

- East Asian Football Championship: 2008, 2010
- Asian Games Gold Medal: 2010
- FIFA Women's World Cup: 2011
- Olympic Silver Medal: 2012
- AFC Women's Asian Cup: 2014

Individual

- Nadeshiko League Best Eleven (11): 1993, 1995, 1996, 1997, 1998, 2005, 2006, 2007, 2008, 2011, 2012
- AFC Women's Player of the Year: 2004, 2008
- Nadeshiko League MVP: 2006, 2008
- EAFF Women's Football Championship Best Player: 2008, 2010
- FIFA Women's World Cup Golden Ball: 2011
- FIFA Women's World Cup Golden Shoe: 2011
- FIFA Women's World Cup All-Star Team: 2011
- FIFA World Player of the Year: 2011
- Asian Football Hall of Fame: 2014
- IFFHS AFC Best Woman Player of the Decade 2011–2020
- |IFFHS AFC Woman Team of the Decade 2011–2020

== Personal life ==
Sawa attended Teikyo University in 1999 until her club team, Nippon TV Beleza, ended her club contract, forcing her to drop out to go play club football in the United States.

On 11 August 2015, Sawa announced her marriage without naming her husband. The next day, when asked, she said that her husband was former Vegalta Sendai player Hiroaki Tsujikami. On 10 January 2017, it was announced that she had given birth to a baby girl.

In 2013, Sawa was made an ambassador for Japan's bid for the 2020 Olympics, which was later chosen to be hosted in Tokyo. In 2021, she pulled out of the 2020 Summer Olympics torch relay due to a chronic inner-ear condition.

Sawa also works as a TV host and commentator in TV Tokyo as well as being an ambassador of the Japan Football Association. In September 2026, she was elected to the 22nd Japan Football Hall of Fame.

== See also ==
- List of FIFA Women's World Cup winning players
- List of women's footballers with 100 or more caps
- List of players who have appeared in multiple FIFA Women's World Cups
