= 2002 CONCACAF Women's Gold Cup =

Coupe d'Or féminine CONCACAF 2002

Tournament details
- Host countries: Canada; United States
- Dates: 27 October – 9 November
- Teams: 8 (from 1 confederation)

Final positions
- Champions: United States (5th title)
- Runners-up: Canada
- Third place: Mexico
- Fourth place: Costa Rica

Tournament statistics
- Matches played: 16
- Goals scored: 80 (5 per match)
- Top scorer(s): (Canada) Charmaine Hooper (Canada) Christine Sinclair (United States) Tiffeny Milbrett (7 goals)
- Best player: (United States) Tiffeny Milbrett
- Best goalkeeper: (Mexico) Jennifer Molina

The 2002 CONCACAF Women's Gold Cup was the sixth staging of the CONCACAF Women's Gold Cup. It was held in Seattle, Washington, United States and Vancouver, British Columbia, Canada. The winning team, the United States, and runners-up, Canada, qualified for the 2003 FIFA Women's World Cup. The U.S. were later awarded hosting rights to the 2003 tournament, replacing China due to the SARS outbreak. The third-placed Mexico played against Japan in two play-off matches for qualification.

== UNCAF Qualifying ==
Nicaragua and Belize withdrew. The first-placed Costa Rica and the second-placed Panama qualified for the Women's Gold Cup.

Team	Pts	Pld	W	D	L	GF	GA
Costa Rica	12	4	4	0	0	16	3
Panama	6	4	2	0	2	8	12
Guatemala	6	4	2	0	2	8	8
El Salvador	3	4	1	0	3	3	11
Honduras	3	4	1	0	3	9	10
Nicaragua	0	0	0	0	0	0	0
Belize	0	0	0	0	0	0	0

July 29, 2002

Panama	2–1	Guatemala

Estadio Cuscatlán, El Salvador

July 29, 2002

Costa Rica	5–2	Honduras

Estadio Cuscatlán, El Salvador

August 1, 2002

Panama	3–1	El Salvador

Estadio Cuscatlán, El Salvador

August 1, 2002

Guatemala	2–1	Honduras

Estadio Cuscatlán, El Salvador

August 3, 2002

Costa Rica	4–0	Guatemala

Estadio Cuscatlán, El Salvador

August 3, 2002

El Salvador	1–0	Honduras

Estadio Cuscatlán, El Salvador

August 4, 2002

Costa Rica	4–1	Panama

Estadio Cuscatlán, El Salvador

August 4, 2002

Guatemala	5–1	El Salvador

Estadio Cuscatlán, El Salvador

August 6, 2002

Costa Rica	3–0	El Salvador

Estadio Cuscatlán, El Salvador

August 6, 2002

Panama	2–6	Honduras

Estadio Cuscatlán, El Salvador

== CFU Qualifying ==
=== First round ===
==== First leg ====
July 5, 2002

Dominica	0–13	Trinidad and Tobago
	Report	Burgin ?', ?', ?'; Des Vignes ?', ?', ?'; Attin-Johnson ?', ?', ?'; St. Louis ?'; Mollon ?'; McGee ?'; Charles ?'

Trinidad and Tobago

July 13, 2002

Jamaica	8–0	Puerto Rico

Jamaica

==== Second leg ====
July 6, 2002

Trinidad and Tobago	9–0	Dominica
Burgin ?'; Dasent ?'; Des Vignes ?', ?'; McGee ?'; Attin-Johnson ?'; James ?', ?'	Report

Trinidad and Tobago

July 21, 2002

Puerto Rico	0–3	Jamaica

Puerto Rico

==== Group 2 ====
Team	Pts	Pld	W	D	L	GF	GA
Haiti	9	3	3	0	0	13	0
Saint Lucia	4	3	1	1	1	9	5
Dominican Republic	4	3	1	1	1	5	4
Bahamas	0	3	0	0	3	1	19

July 10, 2002

Bahamas	0–9	Haiti

Haiti

July 10, 2002

Dominican Republic	2–2	Saint Lucia

Haiti

July 12, 2002

Saint Lucia	0–2	Haiti

Haiti

July 12, 2002

Dominican Republic	3–0	Bahamas

Haiti

July 14, 2002

Saint Lucia	7–1	Bahamas

Haiti

July 14, 2002

Haiti	2–0	Dominican Republic

Haiti

=== Group 3 ===
Guyana and Montserrat withdrew, causing Suriname and U.S. Virgin Islands to win by walkover.

August 8, 2002

Suriname	6–1	U.S. Virgin Islands

Suriname

August 10, 2002

U.S. Virgin Islands	0–2	Suriname

Suriname

=== Final round ===
==== Semifinals ====
August 4, 2002

Jamaica	2–0	Haiti

Jamaica

August 18, 2002

Haiti	0–0	Jamaica

Haiti

August 13, 2002

Suriname	1–3	Trinidad and Tobago
? ?'	Report	Attin-Johnson ?', ?'; Burgin ?'

Suriname

August 15, 2002

Trinidad and Tobago	2–1	Suriname
Charles ?'; Attin-Johnson ?'	Report	? ?'

Suriname

==== Third Place Playoff ====
September 8, 2002

Haiti	3–0	Suriname
Bien-Aime 28'; Nord 42'; J.Pierre 80'

Haiti

September 10, 2002

Suriname	1–2	Haiti
Vliet 4'		Hilaire 45'; Teleus 48'

Haiti

== Final tournament ==
=== First round ===
==== Group A ====
Team	Pts	Pld	W	D	L	GF	GA
United States	9	3	3	0	0	15	0
Mexico	6	3	2	0	1	7	4
Panama	3	3	1	0	2	5	16
Trinidad and Tobago	0	3	0	0	3	2	9

October 27, 2002

Trinidad and Tobago	2–4	Panama
Attin-Johnson 42'; St. Louis 66'		Bedoya 30'; De Mera 35', 61', 64'

Pasadena, United States

October 27, 2002

United States	3–0	Mexico
Wagner 5'; Parlow 42'; MacMillan 90+3'

Pasadena, United States

October 29, 2002

United States	3–0	Trinidad and Tobago
Parlow 19'; Chastain 54'; Milbrett 63'

Fullerton, United States

October 29, 2002

Mexico	5–1	Panama
Gómez 4', 22' (pen.); Sandoval 37'; Leyva 65'; Domínguez 78'		Valderrama 26'

Fullerton, United States

November 2, 2002

Mexico	2–0	Trinidad and Tobago
Gerardo 3', 60'

Seattle, United States

November 2, 2002

United States	9–0	Panama
Milbrett 3', 5', 9', 23', 34'; MacMillan 11', 14'; Roberts 40'; Wambach 86'

Seattle, United States

==== Group B ====
Team	Pts	Pld	W	D	L	GF	GA
Canada	9	3	3	0	0	23	1
Costa Rica	6	3	2	0	1	7	3
Haiti	3	3	1	0	2	3	17
Jamaica	0	3	0	0	3	1	13

October 30, 2002

Jamaica	0–2	Costa Rica
		Chavez 43', 69'

Victoria, Canada

October 30, 2002

Canada	11–1	Haiti
Hooper 6', 26', 32'; Burtini 11', 84'; Sinclair 16', 43', 71', 86'; Chapman 30'; Fenelon 79' (o.g.)		Marseille 14'

Victoria, Canada

November 1, 2002

Haiti	0–5	Costa Rica
		Cruz 53', 68'; Chavez 62', 87'; Briceño 90'

Victoria, Canada

November 1, 2002

Canada	9–0	Jamaica
Sinclair 13', 78'; Hooper 20'; Walsh 42'; Lang 45', 63', 84', 90'; Hermus 55'

Victoria, Canada

November 3, 2002

Jamaica	1–2	Haiti
Sinclair 59'		Gilles 13', 56'

Victoria, Canada

November 3, 2002

Canada	3–0	Costa Rica
Hooper 28', 42'; Sinclair 47'

Victoria, Canada

=== Knockout stage ===
==== Bracket ====
Semi-finals
November 6
Canada	2
Mexico	0
November 6
United States	7
Costa Rica	0

Final
November 9
Canada	1
United States	2
Third place
November 9
Mexico	4
Costa Rica	1

==== Semi-finals ====
Winners qualified for 2003 FIFA Women's World Cup.

November 6, 2002

Canada	2–0	Mexico
Valderrama 10' (o.g.); Gómez 70' (o.g.)	Report

Safeco Field, Seattle, United States

November 6, 2002

United States	7–0	Costa Rica
Parlow 30', 49', 52'; Hucles 65'; Lopez 79' (o.g.); MacMillan 87'; Lilly 90'	Report

Safeco Field, Seattle, United States
Attendance: 10,079

==== Third place playoff ====
Winner advanced to CONCACAF–AFC play-off.

November 9, 2002

Mexico	4–1	Costa Rica
González 13'; Mora 37'; Domínguez 66' (82)		Cruz 26'

Rose Bowl, Pasadena, United States

==== Final ====
November 9, 2002

United States	2–1 (a.e.t./g.g.)	Canada
Milbrett 27'; Hamm 94'	Report	Hooper 45+1'

Rose Bowl, Pasadena, California, United States

2002 Women's Gold Cup winners

United States
Fifth title

== Awards ==
- Most Valuable Player (as Selected by Media): (United States) Tiffeny Milbrett (USA)
- Golden Boot: (Canada) Christine Sinclair; (United States) Tiffeny Milbrett; (Canada) Charmaine Hooper (7 Goals)
- Top Goalkeeper (as Selected by Women's Gold Cup Technical Study Group): (Mexico) Jennifer Molina
- Fair Play Trophy: Costa Rica

=== Best XI ===
Goalkeeper

- (Mexico) Jennifer Molina (MEX)

Defenders

- (Canada) Candace Chapman (CAN)
- (United States) Joy Fawcett (USA)
- (United States) Brandi Chastain (USA)
- (Mexico) Monica Gonzalez (MEX)

Midfielders

- (Costa Rica) Shirley Cruz (CRC)
- (United States) Aly Wagner (USA)
- (Canada) Christine Sinclair (CAN)

Forwards

- (United States) Shannon MacMillan (USA)
- (United States) Tiffeny Milbrett (USA)
- (Canada) Charmaine Hooper (USA)

Substitutes

- GK: (Trinidad and Tobago) Lisa Jo Ramkissoon (TRI)
- DF: (Costa Rica) Gabriela Trujillo (CRC)
- MD: (Trinidad and Tobago) Tasha St. Louis (TRI)
- AT: (Haiti) Marie-Denise Gilles (HAI)
- AT: (Mexico) Maribel Domínguez (MEX)
- AT: (Canada) Kara Lang (CAN)
- A:T (United States) Cindy Parlow (USA)
