= Itzel Velasco =

Mexican footballer (born 2004)

Personal information
- Full name: Itzel Alejandra Velasco Loza
- Date of birth: 23 September 2004 (age 22)
- Place of birth: Jalisco, Mexico
- Height: 1.72 m (5 ft 8 in)
- Position: Goalkeeper

Team information
- Current team: América
- Number: 12

Youth career
- Atlas

Senior career*
Years	Team	Apps	(Gls)
2021–2022	Atlas	8	(0)
2022–	América	45	(0)

International career^{‡}
2023	Mexico U-20	4	(0)
2025–	Mexico	2	(0)
- * Club domestic league appearances and goals as of 8 July 2026 ‡ National team caps and goals as of 24 May 2026

Itzel Alejandra Velasco Loza (born 23 September 2004) is a Mexican professional footballer who plays as goalkeeper for Liga MX Femenil side Club América and the Mexico women's national football team.

== Club career ==
=== Club Atlas (2021–2022) ===
Velasco is a product of Atlas’ youth academy. She was promoted to the first-team as a reserved goalkeeper ahead of the Clasura 2021 tournament. She made her professional debut with Atlas on 29 October 2021, during the Apertura 2021 tournament, in a match against Mazatlán in which she initiated the game.

During the Clausura 2022, Velasco became Atlas starting goalkeeper near the end of the tournament after Atlas captain and first-choice goalkeeper, Ana Gabriela Paz, got injured.

=== Club América (2022–present) ===
After not renewing her contract with Atlas, Velasco signed with Club América on 26 December 2022. She made her debut with América on 16 January 2023, in a 7–0 victory for América over Puebla.

Velasco obtained her first Liga MX Femenil title on 5 June 2023, when América defeated Pachuca in the final of the Clausura 2023 tournament.

Although used mostly as a reserved goalkeeper, Velasco became the first-choice goalkeeper for América during the Clausura 2024 tournament, helping her team reached the final of the tournament. On 29 July 2024, Velasco suffered an ACL injury during a league match against Toluca, leaving her out of play for most of the 2024–25 season.

== International career ==
Velasco has been part of the Mexico women's national football team youth program since the U-15 level.

Since 2023, she has been part of the Mexico women's national under-20 football team, participating with the team at the 2023 CONCACAF Women's U-20 Championship. During this competition, Velasco helped Mexico win the tournament and a spot in the 2024 FIFA U-20 Women's World Cup by starting in 4 out of 5 games, including the final against the U.S., in which she saved a penalty. Due to her performance throughout the tournament, CONCACAF awarded Velasco the best goalkeeper award.

Velasco received her first call-up to the senior Mexico women's national team from manager Pedro López on 28 March 2024, for friendly matches against Colombia and Australia, but she did not played in any of these games. She finally made her senior debut on 26 October 2025, in a friendly match against New Zealand.

== Career statistics ==
=== Club ===
As of match played 8 July 2026

Appearances and goals by club, season and competition
Club	Season	League			Cup (Note: Includes Campeón de Campeonas)		Continental (Note: Includes CONCACAF W Champions Cup)		Total	
Club	Season	Division	Apps	Goals	Apps	Goals			Apps	Goals
Atlas	2020–21	Liga MX Femenil	0	0	—		—		0	0
Atlas	2021–22	Liga MX Femenil	7	0	—		—		7	0
Atlas	2022–23	Liga MX Femenil	1	0	—		—		1	0
Atlas	Total		8	0	—		—		8	0
Club América	2022–23	Liga MX Femenil	8	3	—		—		8	0
Club América	2023–24	Liga MX Femenil	31	0	1	0	—		32	0
Club América	2024–25	Liga MX Femenil	2	0	—		1	0	3	0
Club América	2025–26	Liga MX Femenil	4	0	—		4	0	8	0
Club América	Total		45	0	1	0	5	0	51	0
Career total			53	0	1	0	5	0	59	0

== Honours ==
=== Club ===
América

- Liga MX Femenil: Clausura 2023, Clausura 2026
- CONCACAF W Champions Cup: 2025–26

=== International ===
Mexico U-20

- CONCACAF Women's U-20 Championship: 2023
- Sud Ladies Cup runner-up: 2024

=== Individual ===
- CONCACAF Women's U-20 Championship Best goalkeeper: 2023
- CONCACAF W Champions Cup Best goalkeeper: 2025–26
- Sud Ladies Cup Best goalkeeper: 2024
