= 2003 FIFA Women's World Cup qualification =

2003 FIFA Women's World Cup Qualification
Tournament details
- Dates: 25 August 2001 – 12 July 2003
- Teams: 99 (from 6 confederations)

The 2003 FIFA Women's World Cup qualification process decided the 15 teams which played at the 2003 FIFA Women's World Cup, with the host China initially qualified automatically as the host nation. The qualification process for the 2003 FIFA Women's World Cup saw 99 teams from the six FIFA confederations compete for the 16 places in the tournament's finals. The places were divided as follows:

- Africa – represented by the CAF: 2 berths
- Asia – AFC: 3.5
- Europe – UEFA: 5
- North, Central America & the Caribbean – CONCACAF: 2.5
- Oceania – OFC: 1
- South America – CONMEBOL: 2

== Qualified teams ==
Team	Qualified as	Qualification date	Appearance in finals	Last appearance	Consecutive streak	Previous best performance
China	Hosts; Runners-up (2003 AFC Women's Championship)	26 October 2000	4th	1999	4	Runners-up (1999)
Germany	UEFA qualification Group 4 winners	18 April 2002	4th	1999	4	Runners-up (1995)
Norway	UEFA qualification Group 1 winners	9 May 2002	4th	1999	4	Champions (1995)
Russia	UEFA qualification Group 3 winners	8 June 2002	2nd	1999	2	Quarter-finals (1999)
Sweden	UEFA qualification Group 2 winners	26 June 2002	4th	1999	4	Third place (1991)
Canada	2002 CONCACAF Women's Gold Cup runners-up	6 November 2002	3rd	1999	3	Group stage (1995)
United States	2002 CONCACAF Women's Gold Cup champions	6 November 2002	4th	1999	4	Champions (1991, 1999)
France	UEFA qualification Play-Off winners	16 November 2002	1st	–	1	Debut
Ghana	2002 African Women's Championship runners-up	17 December 2002	2nd	1999	2	Group stage (1999)
Nigeria	2002 African Women's Championship champions	18 December 2002	4th	1999	4	Quarter-finals (1999)
Australia	2003 OFC Women's Championship champions	13 April 2003	3rd	1999	3	Group stage (1995, 1999)
Brazil	2003 South American Women's Football Championship champions	27 April 2003	4th	1999	4	Third place (1999)
Argentina	2003 South American Women's Football Championship runners-up	27 April 2003	1st	–	1	Debut
North Korea	2003 AFC Women's Championship champions	19 June 2003	2nd	1999	2	Group stage (1999)
South Korea	2003 AFC Women's Championship 3rd place	21 June 2003	1st	–	1	Debut
Japan	CONCACAF–AFC play-off winners	12 July 2003	4th	1999	4	Quarter-finals (1995)

== Confederation qualification ==
=== AFC ===
Like the previous edition, the AFC Women's Championship served as the tournament qualification for AFC members. Fourteens competed in the competition which included the World Cup hosts in China. After the group stage which eliminated ten teams from qualifying, the semi-finals saw the first team in North Korea as they defeated Japan 3–0. After China won the second semi, the third-place play-off would see South Korea qualify with a 1–0 victory over Japan which meant Japan had to qualify via play-off against the third place team from CONCACAF (Mexico).

==== Final tournament ====
Group A

Team	Pld	W	D	L	GF	GA	GD	Pts
North Korea	4	3	1	0	45	2	+43	10
South Korea	4	3	1	0	20	2	+18	10
Thailand	4	2	0	2	6	21	−15	6
Hong Kong	4	1	0	3	2	24	−22	3
Singapore	4	0	0	4	0	24	−24	0

Group B

Team	Pld	W	D	L	GF	GA	GD	Pts
Japan	4	4	0	0	34	0	+34	12
Myanmar	4	2	1	1	11	8	+3	7
Chinese Taipei	4	2	1	1	7	7	0	7
Philippines	4	1	0	3	2	26	−24	3
Guam	4	0	0	4	2	15	−13	0

Group C

Team	Pld	W	D	L	GF	GA	GD	Pts
China	3	3	0	0	29	0	+29	9
Vietnam	3	2	0	1	6	9	−3	6
India	3	1	0	2	7	14	−7	3
Uzbekistan	3	0	0	3	2	21	−19	0

Knockout stage (top two teams qualify for World Cup)

Semifinals
19 June - Bangkok
North Korea	3
Japan	0
19 June - Bangkok
China	3
South Korea	1

Final
21 June - Bangkok
North Korea	2
China	1
Third place
21 June - Bangkok
Japan	0
South Korea	1

=== CAF ===
Like the previous edition, the Africa Women's Championship served as the tournament qualification for CAF members.

- Qualifying stage: Qualifying for the 2002 edition took place between 10 August to 13 October 2002. 21 teams entered the qualification with seven teams getting the bye into the second-round. Qualification ties were played on a home-and-away two-legged basis. The seven winners of the second round qualified for the final tournament to join the hosts Nigeria who qualified automatically.
- Final tournament: Eight teams played in the 2002 African Women's Championship, which was held from 7 to 20 December 2002 in Nigeria. They were drawn into two groups of four teams. The top two teams of each group advanced to the knockout stage, where the winners of the semi-finals and the third place play-off qualified for the World Cup.

==== Qualifying stage ====
The seven winners of the second qualifying round advanced to the final tournament: Angola, Cameroon, Ethiopia, Ghana, Mali, South Africa, and Zimbabwe.

==== Final tournament ====
Group A

Team	Pld	W	D	L	GF	GA	GD	Pts	Qualification
Ghana	3	3	0	0	6	0	+6	9	Knockout stage
Nigeria	3	2	0	1	8	2	+6	6	Knockout stage
Mali	3	0	1	2	3	9	−6	1	
Ethiopia	3	0	1	2	2	8	−6	1	

Group B

Pos	Team	Pld	W	D	L	GF	GA	GD	Pts	Qualification
1	South Africa	3	2	1	0	6	3	+3	7	Knockout stage
2	Cameroon	3	1	1	1	2	2	0	4	Knockout stage
3	Angola	3	0	2	1	2	3	−1	2	
4	Zimbabwe	3	0	2	1	2	4	−2	2	

Knockout stage (top two teams qualify for World Cup)

Semifinals
17 December - Warri
Ghana	3
Cameroon	2
18 December - Warri
South Africa	0
Nigeria	5

Final
20 December - Warri
Ghana	0
Nigeria	2
Third place
20 December - Warri
Cameroon	3
South Africa	0

=== Europe (UEFA) ===
Qualified: Sweden – Russia – Germany – Norway – France

The 16 teams belonging to Class A of European women's football were drawn into four groups, from which the group winners qualify for the World Cup. The four runners-up were played in playoff-matches for the 5th berth.

=== North, Central America & the Caribbean (CONCACAF) ===
Qualified: United States – Canada

The 2002 CONCACAF Women's Gold Cup second-placed Canada qualified for the 2003 FIFA Women's World Cup. The winner USA qualified as host. The third-placed Mexico played against Japan in two play-off matches for qualification.

=== Oceania (OFC) ===
Qualified: Australia

The 2003 OFC Women's Championship determined the OFC's one qualifier for the 2003 FIFA Women's World Cup – the winner Australia.

=== South America (CONMEBOL) ===
Qualified: Brazil – Argentina

The fourth edition of the Sudamericano Femenino (Women's South American Championship) in 2003 determined the CONMEBOL's qualifiers Brazil and Argentina.

== CONCACAF–AFC play-off ==
The draw for the order of legs was held at the FIFA headquarters in Zurich, Switzerland on 4 March 2003. The matches were originally scheduled to take place on 10 and 17 May 2003. However, due to the postponement of the 2003 FIFA Women's World Cup, the matches instead took place on 5 and 12 July 2003.

Team 1	Agg.	Team 2	1st leg	2nd leg
Mexico	2–4	Japan	2–2	0–2
