= Kimberly Rodríguez =

Mexican footballer (born 1999)

Kimberly Rodriguez
Personal information
- Full name: Kimberly Vanessa Rodríguez Cubero
- Date of birth: 26 March 1999 (age 27)
- Place of birth: Montgomery, Texas, U.S.
- Height: 1.68 m (5 ft 6 in)
- Position: Centre-back

Team information
- Current team: América
- Number: 15

College career
Years	Team	Apps	(Gls)
2017–2021	Oklahoma State Cowgirls	90	(10)

Senior career*
Years	Team	Apps	(Gls)
2022–	América	153	(13)

International career^{‡}
2014	Mexico U-15	4	(0)
2014–2016	Mexico U-17	13	(0)
2018	Mexico U-20	6	(0)
2019–	Mexico	32	(2)
Medal record
Women's football
Representing Mexico
Pan American Games
Gold medal – first place	2023 Santiago	Team
- * Club domestic league appearances and goals as of 24 May 2026 ‡ National team caps and goals as of 24 May 2026

Kimberly Vanessa Rodríguez Cubero (born 26 March 1999), known as Kimberly Rodríguez, is a professional footballer who plays as a centre-back for Liga MX Femenil side Club América. Born in the United States, she represents Mexico at the international level.

== College career ==
Rodríguez spent five years (2017–2021) playing college football for the Oklahoma State Cowgirls. During her time with the Cowgirls, Rodríguez became an important part of the team, making 90 appearances, scoring 10 goals and 25 assists.

== Club career ==
=== Club América (2022–present) ===
After wrapping-up college in the fall of 2021, Rodríguez signed her first professional contract with Liga MX Femenil side Club América on 1 January 2022. She made her league debut with América on 15 January 2022, on a match against Pumas as part of matchday two of the Clausura 2022 tournament.

Since her debut with América, Rodríguez has become a key player for the club and has played an important role in recent America's successes, such as the Liga MX Femenil championship that the club obtained during the Clausura 2023 tournament.

== International career ==
Rodríguez has been part of the Mexico women's national football team program since the U-15 level. She represented Mexico at the youth level in the 2014 Summer Youth Olympics, two FIFA U-17 Women's World Cup editions (2014 and 2016), the 2016 CONCACAF Women's U-17 Championship, the 2018 CONCACAF Women's U-20 Championship, and the 2018 FIFA U-20 Women's World Cup. She made her senior debut with Mexico on 27 February 2019, in a friendly match against Italy.

=== 2023 Pan American Games ===
Rodríguez was selected by Mexico's manager Pedro López to represent Mexico at the 2023 Pan American Games held in Santiago, Chile. During this competition, Rodriguez started on four of the five games that Mexico played, helping the team go undefeated to obtain the gold medal for the first time in history at the Pan American Games.

=== 2024 W Gold Cup ===
Rodríguez was part of the Mexico national team that participated at the 2024 CONCACAF W Gold Cup. She played a minor role during this competition, appearing only in one of the five games that Mexico played during the competition.

== Career statistics ==
=== Club ===
As of match played 13 July 2025

Appearances and goals by club, season, and competition
Club	Season	League			Cup (Note: Includes Campeón de Campeones)		League Cup (Note: Includes Summer Cup)		Continental (Note: Includes CONCACAF W Champions Cup)		Total	
Club	Season	Division	Apps	Goals	Apps	Goals	Apps	Goals	Apps	Goals	Apps	Goals
Club América	2021–22	Liga MX Femenil	16	0	—		—		—		16	0
Club América	2022–23	Liga MX Femenil	32	0	—		—		—		32	0
Club América	2023–24	Liga MX Femenil	36	4	2	0	—		—		38	4
Club América	2024–25	Liga MX Femenil	27	3	—		3	0	4	0	34	3
Club América	Total		111	7	2	0	3	0	4	0	120	7
Career total			111	7	2	0	3	0	4	0	120	7

=== International goals ===
Scores and results list Mexico's goal tally first

No.	Date	Venue	Opponent	Score	Result	Competition
1.	6 August 2019	Estadio Universidad San Marcos, Lima, Peru	Panama	2–0	5–1	2019 Pan American Games
2.	10 April 2026	Estadio Carlos Vega Villalba, Zacatecas, Mexico	U.S. Virgin Islands	5–0	9–0	2026 CONCACAF W Championship qualification

== Honours ==
Mexico

- Centroamericanos Games 2023, gold medal
- Pan American Games 2023, gold medal

Club América

- Liga MX Femenil: Clausura 2023, Clausura 2026
- Liga MX Femenil: Campeón de Campeonas 2026
- CONCACAF W Copa de Campeonas 2025–26
