= 2015 Empress's Cup final =

2015 Empress's Cup Final
INAC Kobe Leonessa	Albirex Niigata
1	0
- Date: December 27, 2015
- Venue: Kawasaki Todoroki Stadium, Kanagawa

2015 Empress's Cup Final was the 37th final of the Empress's Cup competition. The final was played at Kawasaki Todoroki Stadium in Kanagawa on December 27, 2015. INAC Kobe Leonessa won the championship.

== Overview ==
INAC Kobe Leonessa won their 5th title, by defeating Albirex Niigata – with Homare Sawa goal.

== Match details ==
December 27, 2015

INAC Kobe Leonessa	1-0	Albirex Niigata
Homare Sawa 78'	Report

Kawasaki Todoroki Stadium

== See also ==
- 2015 Empress's Cup
