= Christopher Cuéllar =

American soccer coach (born 1980)

Personal information
- Full name: Christopher Cuéllar
- Date of birth: 15 June 1980 (age 46)
- Place of birth: Coronado, California, United States
- Height: 1.75 m (5 ft 9 in)

Team information
- Current team: Los Angeles FC (academy coach)

Managerial career
- Years: Team
- 2011–2012: Mexico U17 (women)
- 2013–2014: Mexico U20 (women)
- 2015–2016: Mexico U17 (women)
- 2017–2018: Mexico U20 (women)
- 2019–2021: Mexico (women)
- 2023–: Los Angeles FC (academy coach)

Christopher Cuéllar (born 15 June 1980) is an American-born Mexican manager who is a current academy coach of Los Angeles FC.

== Coaching career ==
From 2011 to 2018, Cuéllar coached both Mexico women's national under-17 football team and Mexico U-20 participating in the 2012 FIFA U-17 Women's World Cup, the 2014 FIFA U-20 Women's World Cup, the 2016 FIFA U-17 Women's World Cup and the 2018 FIFA U-20 Women's World Cup. In 2019, he was named the coach for Mexico women's national football team. In 2023, he joined the academy staff of Los Angeles FC.

== Personal life ==
His father Leonardo Cuéllar, also coached the Mexico women's national football team.
