= Jennifer Molina =

Mexican footballer (born 1981)

Personal information
- Full name: Jennifer Marie Molina Shea
- Date of birth: 27 June 1981 (age 45)
- Place of birth: Mexico City, Mexico
- Height: 1.75 m (5 ft 9 in)
- Position: Goalkeeper

Youth career
- Colgate Raiders

International career
Years	Team	Apps	(Gls)
- Mexico

Jennifer Marie Molina Shea (born June 27, 1981) is a Mexican former football goalkeeper who played for the Mexico women's national football team. She competed at the 2004 Summer Olympics in Athens, Greece, where the team finished in eighth place. Molina was affiliated with the Colgate University.
