= Elizabeth Gómez =

Mexican footballer (born 1981)

Lisa Gomez
Personal information
- Full name: Elizabeth Patricia Gómez Randall
- Date of birth: 21 September 1981 (age 45)
- Place of birth: Galliano, Louisiana, United States
- Position: Defender

College career
Years	Team	Apps	(Gls)
1999–2002	Miami Hurricanes		

International career
2002–2007	Mexico		

Elizabeth Patricia 'Lisa' Gómez Randall (born 21 September 1981) is an American-born Mexican former footballer who played as a defender for the Mexico women's national football team at the 2004 Summer Olympics. At the collegiate level, she played for the University of Miami in the United States.

== See also ==
- Mexico at the 2004 Summer Olympics
