= Iris Mora =

Mexican footballer (born 1981)

Personal information
- Full name: Iris Adriana Mora Vallejo
- Date of birth: 22 September 1981 (age 45)
- Place of birth: Cancún, Mexico
- Position: Forward

College career
Years	Team	Apps	(Gls)
2002–2005	UCLA		

International career^{‡}
1999–2006	Mexico	13	(2)
- ‡ National team caps and goals as of 26 November 2006

Iris Adriana Mora Vallejo (born 22 September 1981) is a Mexican former footballer who played as a forward. She has been a member of the Mexico women's national team.

== College career ==
Mora attended the University of California, Los Angeles in the United States.

== International career ==
Mora played for Mexico at senior level in the 1999 FIFA Women's World Cup, two CONCACAF Women's Championship editions (2002 and 2006) and the 2004 Summer Olympics.

== See also ==
- Mexico at the 2004 Summer Olympics
