= Pedro López (football manager) =

Spanish football manager (born 1979)

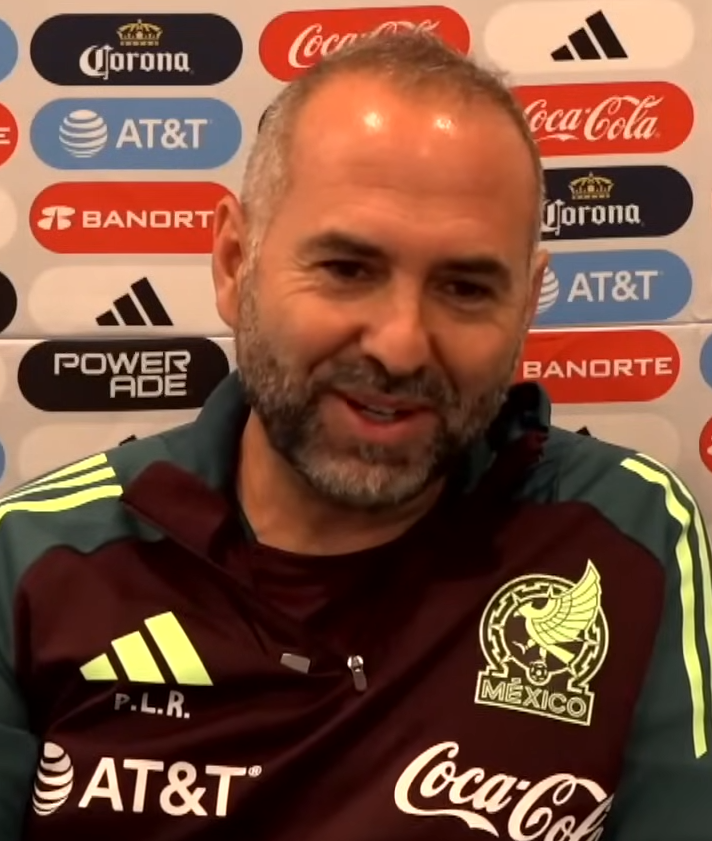
- López in 2024

Personal information
- Full name: Pedro López Ramos
- Date of birth: 6 May 1979 (age 47)
- Place of birth: Aguilar de Campoo, Spain

Team information
- Current team: Mexico (women) (manager)

Managerial career
- Years: Team
- 2001–2003: Aguilar Juvenil
- 2006–2008: Canillas Juvenil
- 2007–2008: Real Madrid Juvenil (assistant)
- 2008–2011: Spain U15 (women) (assistant)
- 2008–2011: Spain U16 (women) (assistant)
- 2008–2011: Spain U17 (women) (assistant)
- 2011–2014: Spain U16 (women)
- 2014–2018: Spain U17 (women) (assistant)
- 2014–2018: Spain U19 (women) (assistant)
- 2014–2016: Spain U20 (women) (assistant)
- 2016–2022: Spain U20 (women)
- 2019–2022: Spain U19 (women)
- 2022–: Mexico (women)

Pedro López Ramos (born 6 May 1979) is a Spanish football manager who currently manages the Mexico women's national football team.

== Career ==
In 2011, López became the manager for the Spain U-16 women's national team.

In 2014, it was announced that López would become the head coach for Spain U19.

In 2021, López was appointed as manager of the Spain U17, Spain U19, Spain U20.

In 2022, López was named manager of the Mexico women's national football team.

== Honours ==
Spain U19

- UEFA Women's Under-19 Euro: 2022

Spain U20

- FIFA U-20 Women's World Cup: 2022; runners-up: 2018

Mexico

- Central American and Caribbean Games: 2023
- Pan American Games: 2023
