= Mexico women's national football team =

Women's association football team

Mexico
- Nickname(s): El Tri Femenil; El Tri; Adelitas
- Association: Federación Mexicana de Fútbol
- Confederation: CONCACAF (North America)
- Sub-confederation: NAFU (North America)
- Head coach: Pedro López
- Captain: Rebeca Bernal
- Most caps: Maribel Domínguez (116)
- Top scorer: Maribel Domínguez (86)
- FIFA code: MEX
First colours	Second colours

FIFA ranking
- Current: 28 (20 October 2026)
- Highest: 21 (December 2011)
- Lowest: 36 (August 2022; August 2023)

First international
- Mexico 9–0 Austria (Jesolo, Italy; 6 July 1970)

Biggest win
- Mexico 16–0 El Salvador (Mexico; 14 May 2000)

Biggest defeat
- United States 12–0 Mexico (Port-au-Prince, Haiti; 18 April 1991)

World Cup
- Appearances: 4 (first in 1999)
- Best result: Group stage (1999, 2011, 2015)

Olympic Games
- Appearances: 1 (first in 2004)
- Best result: Quarter-finals (2004)

CONCACAF W Championship
- Appearances: 7 (first in 1991)
- Best result: Runners-up (1998, 2010)

CONCACAF W Gold Cup
- Appearances: 1 (first in 2024)
- Best result: Semi-finals (2024)
Medal record
CONCACAF W Championship
Silver medal – second place	1998 Canada	Team
Silver medal – second place	2010 Mexico	Team
Bronze medal – third place	1994 Canada	Team
Bronze medal – third place	2002 Canada / United States	Team
Bronze medal – third place	2006 United States	Team
Bronze medal – third place	2014 United States	Team
Pan American Games
Gold medal – first place	2023 Santiago	Team
Silver medal – second place	1999 Winnipeg	Team
Bronze medal – third place	2003 Santo Domingo	Team
Bronze medal – third place	2011 Guadalajara	Team
Bronze medal – third place	2015 Toronto	Team
Central American and Caribbean Games
Gold medal – first place	2014 Veracruz	Team
Gold medal – first place	2018 Barranquilla	Team
Gold medal – first place	2023 San Salvador	Team
Gold medal – first place	2026 Santo Domingo	Team

The Mexico women's national football team (Spanish: selección nacional de México femenil) represents Mexico in international women's football. The team is governed by the Mexican Football Federation and competes within CONCACAF, the Confederation of North, Central American and Caribbean Association Football. It has won three gold medals in the Central American and Caribbean Games and a gold medal in the Pan American Games, as well as a silver and bronze in the Women's World Cup prior to FIFA's recognition of the women's game. In addition to its senior team, Mexico also has U-23, U-20, U-17, U-16, U-15, and U-13 teams. The U-17 team reached the final of the 2018 FIFA U-17 Women's World Cup and came in third in the 2025 FIFA U-17 Women's World Cup.

The senior team was originally established in 1963, but its first FIFA-recognized game was in 1991. Mexico's senior team has participated in three Women's World Cups and one edition of the Summer Olympic Games. Mexico is set to co-host the 2031 FIFA Women's World Cup along with the Costa Rica, Jamaica and United States, earning them an automatic qualification as co-hosts.

Pedro López is the current national team's manager, after taking the role in late 2022.

== History ==
=== Unofficial era ===
Although not officially recognized by FIFA until 1991, Mexico's team was actually established in 1963, when many countries still had bans on women's football. In the 1950s, both Costa Rica and Argentina witnessed increased interest in the women's game and held tours in various countries. In 1963, Las Ticas, the Costa Rica women's national football team, spent six months in Mexico conducting a tour to increase exposure of the game. Observing the success of Las Ticas, Mexico formed its first team to play in opposition to Costa Rica.

Led by Alicia Vargas, Mexico placed third in the 1970 Women's World Cup, a tournament FIFA has yet to acknowledge. Mexico fell 2–1 in the semifinal to hosts Italy before defeating England 3–2 in the third place match. The following year, Mexico hosted the 1971 Women's World Cup, which has also yet to be officially recognized. The squad reached the final but fell 3–0 to Denmark. An estimated 110,000 people attended the final at Estadio Azteca, which is the largest crowd ever to witness a women's soccer game; FIFA has not recognized this attendance record either.

To participate in each world cup, teams had to qualify. Mexico faced Peru, Argentina, and South Africa en route to the 1971 edition.

=== Modern era ===
In the 1980s, when a series of mundialitos took place, Mexico participated in the 1986 edition. Mexico was placed in Group A along with Italy and Japan, but the team did not advance beyond the first stage.

Mexico's first official appearance in the Women's World Cup was in 1999, when the United States hosted the tournament. The team also qualified in 2011 and 2015, hosted by Germany and Canada, respectively. Likewise, the team qualified for the Summer Olympic Games in 2004. In all four instances, El Tri Femenil failed to advance beyond the group stage; in fact, the team has yet to win a single game in either major tournament.

The first official coach for the Mexico women's national football team was Leonardo Cuéllar. One of his first objectives was to qualify for the 1999 Women's World Cup. The team accomplished this by placing second to Canada in the 1998 CONCACAF Women's Championship. However, much controversy arose regarding the nationalities of the recruited players. Preference was given to US-born players of Mexican heritage, largely because Mexico did not have an official league at the time. Andrea Rodebaugh, the team's then-captain, argued that the team's main goal was to qualify; she also wanted to strengthen the team and celebrate its official recognition. Despite the controversy, the team went on to participate in the 1999 Women's World Cup with a mix of US-born and Mexican-born players.

In recent years, an increase in young talent developing in Mexico brought an increase of expectations from Mexican football fans and media alike. Following their worst ever World Cup finish in 2015, fans began calling for Cuellar's resignation or firing. In 2016, the women's national football team failed to qualify for the Olympics, and lost to Costa Rica, which was the turning point in the team's history since many thought the defeat resulted in Mexico becoming the fourth-best team in CONCACAF. With these results and Leonardo Cuellar's controversial decision to not bring Charlyn Corral and Kenti Robles, who had terrific seasons at their clubs in Spain's Primera División, onto the squad led to his resignation from his position in April 2016. Roberto Medina became the head coach in 2017.

In 2018 Mexico won the Central American and Caribbean Games by defeating Costa Rica 3–1 in the final.

At the 2018 CONCACAF Women's Championship Mexico entered as the third highest ranked team behind the United States and Canada. At the tournament Mexico finished third in their group with a record of one win and two losses, which included a surprising 2–0 loss to Panama. As a result of not advancing to the knockout round, Mexico was unable to qualify for the 2019 FIFA Women's World Cup in France. Medina was replaced by U-20 coach Christopher Cuellar, Leo Cuellar's son. His tenure was short-lived, having placed fifth in the 2019 Pan American Games (despite absences from the United States and Canada) and after failing to qualify for the 2020 Olympics. He was replaced in January 2021 by Mónica Vergara, who led the U-17 squad to the 2018 FIFA U-17 Women's World Cup final.

=== Notable matches ===
Mexico's first recorded international game was against Austria during the 1970 Women's World Cup, when squad beat the European side 9–0 in the group stage. However, to participate in this inaugural tournament, teams had to qualify, so La Tri played against other teams prior to this match.

Before the modern era, Mexico defeated England 2–1 in the third place match of the 1970 Women's World Cup, the first edition of the tournament. In front of a record-breaking crowd, the team also reached the final of the 1971 Women's World Cup, but fell 3–0 to Denmark.

Among the most notable victories is when the team finished second in the 2010 CONCACAF Women's Gold Cup. Hosts of the cup, Mexico defeated the United States in the semifinal for the first time before falling to Canada in the final. Mexico would go 14 years before defeating the United States again after defeating the hosts 2–0 in the first-ever 2024 CONCACAF W Gold Cup. It was the second time Mexico beat the senior team in 43 attempts, and it was the first time Mexico did so in the United States. The United States hadn't lost against a CONCACAF rival at home since a defeat by Canada in 2000.

== Team image ==
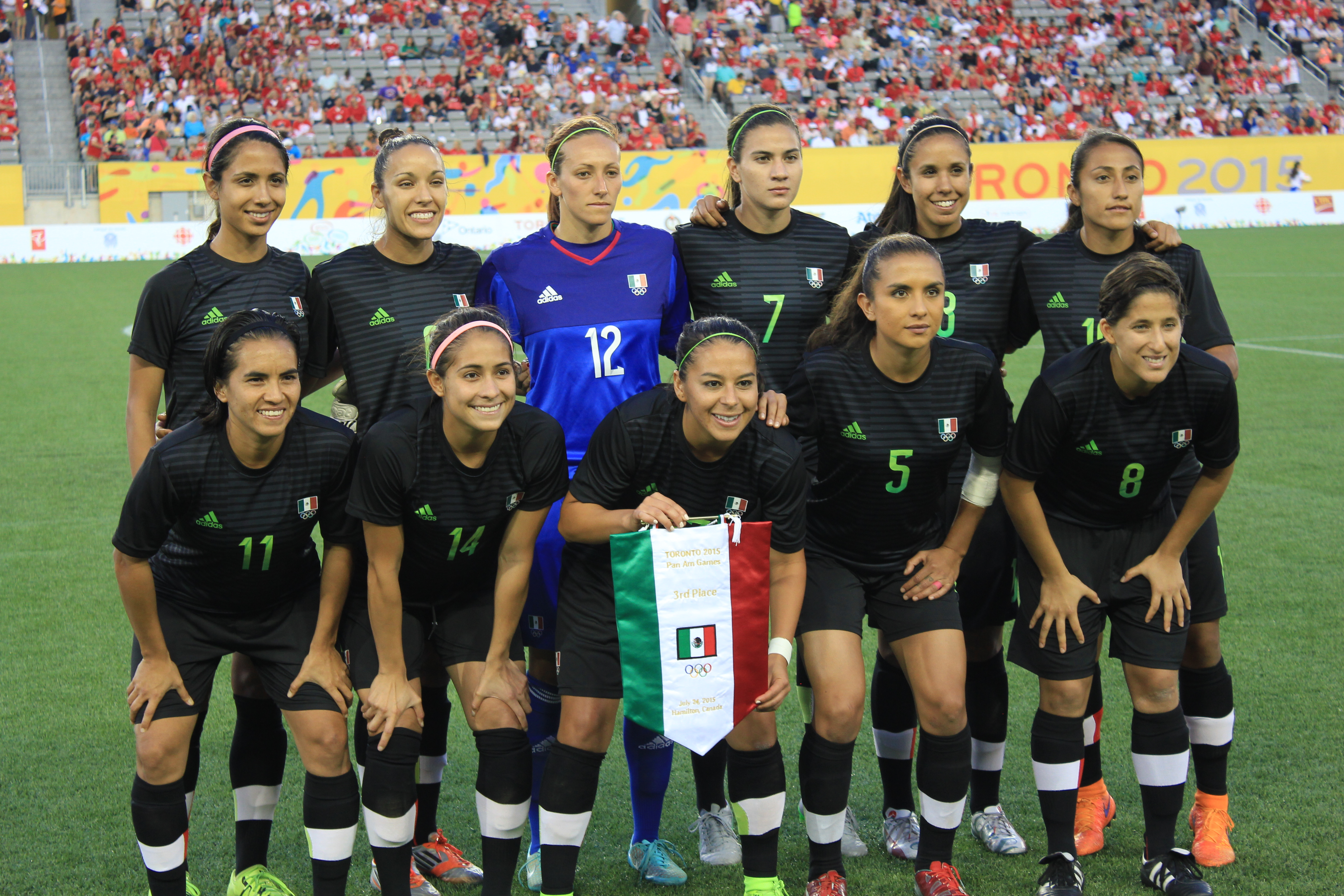
The women's national football team of Mexico in 2015

=== Nicknames ===
The Mexico women's national football team has been known or nicknamed as the "El Tri Femenil" or "La Tri."

=== Home stadium ===
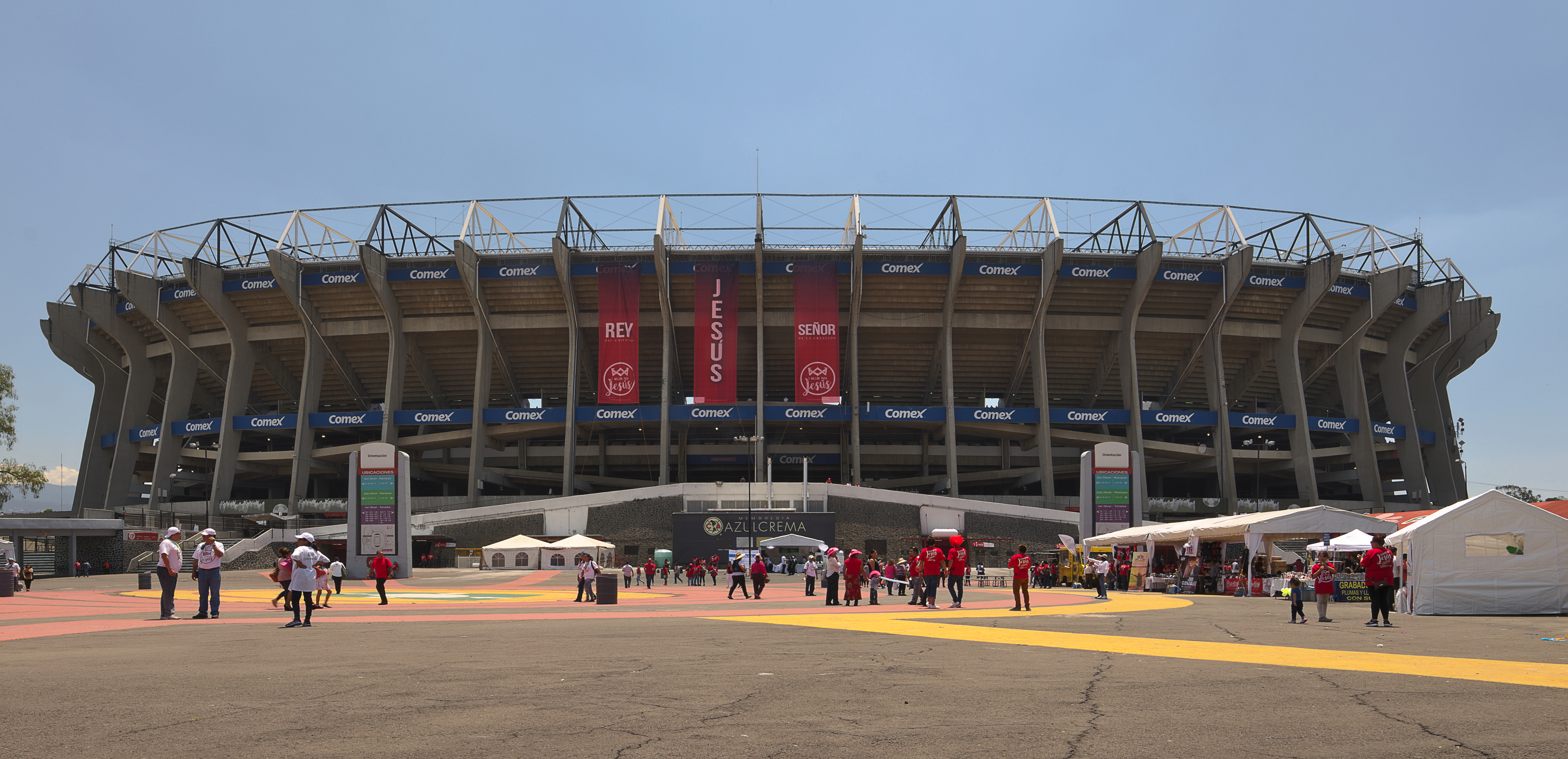
Azteca Stadium is the home of the Mexico women's national team.

The Estadio Azteca, also known in Spanish as "El Coloso de Santa Úrsula", was built in 1966. It is the official home stadium of the Mexico women's national team, as well as the Mexican club team Club América (women). It has a capacity of 87,000 seats (after renovation works) making it the largest football-specific stadium in the Americas and the third largest stadium in the world for that sport.

=== Domestic recognition ===
In various occasions, fans have shown up in large numbers to support La Tri. When Mexico played against Denmark in the 1971 Women's World Cup final, over 100,000 showed up at Estadio Azteca. Likewise, when Mexico played Argentina in a playoff game to qualify for the 1999 Women's World Cup, over 700,000 fans were in attendance.

Until recently, attention around the women's team was dwarf edition and was the subject for a series that featured the women's teams and women's teams competing at a tournament of their choosing at a time of the season and a tournament of its kind that included the by the men's squad. Few matches were televised or advertised, limiting knowledge around the team's achievements and struggles. Former ESPN commentator Nelly Simón frequently advocated for more attention to this team. Likewise, after winning the gold medal at the 2018 Central American and Caribbean Games, Kenti Robles called on news outlets and fans to pay more attention to them. However, with increased attention in the women's game after the establishment of the women's league in 2017, more games have been televised. Since then, millions watched Mexico play in the U-17 world cup final against Spain in 2018.

=== Player preparation ===
Many national team players currently play in the Liga MX Femenil, Mexico's first-division women's league. Some players also play in the United States via the NWSL or the NCAA, while others elect to play in Spain's Primera Divisíon. A few have played in the top women's leagues in Australia, China, England, France, Japan, Italy, Israel, the Netherlands, Portugal, and Sweden.

== Overall official record ==
Competition	Stage	Result	Opponent	Position	Scorers
(Haiti) 1991 CONCACAF Tournament	Group stage	0–12	United States		
		1–3	Trinidad and Tobago		
		8–1	Martinique	3 / 4	
(Canada) 1994 CONCACAF Tournament	Group stage	0–9	United States		
		0–6	Canada		
		3–1	Jamaica		
		3–3	Trinidad and Tobago	3 / 5	
(Canada) 1998 CONCACAF Tournament	Group stage	3–2	Costa Rica		
		7–1	Haiti		
		2–2	Trinidad and Tobago	1 / 4	
	Semi-finals	8–0	Guatemala		
	Final	0–1	Canada		
(United States) 1999 World Cup	Group stage	1–7	Brazil		Domínguez
		0–6	Germany		
		0–2	Italy	4 / 4	
(Canada) 1999 Pan American Games	Group stage	1–1	United States		
		2–3	Canada		
		5–1	Costa Rica		
		5–1	Trinidad and Tobago	3 / 5	
	Semi-finals	2–2 (PSO: 5–3)	Canada		
	Final	0–1	United States		
(United States) 2000 Gold Cup	Group stage	3–4	Canada		Domínguez 2, Mora
		7–0	Guatemala		Mora 4, Domínguez 3
		0–3	China	3 / 4	
(United States) 2002 Gold Cup	Group stage	0–3	United States		
		5–1	Panama		Gómez 2, Domínguez, Leyva, Sandoval
		2–0	Trinidad and Tobago	2 / 4	Gerardo 2
	Semi-finals	0–2	Canada		
	Third place match	4–1	Costa Rica		Domínguez 2, González, Mora
(Dominican Republic) 2003 Pan American Games	Group stage	1–0	Costa Rica		Worbis
		3–1	Argentina		Mora, Rosales, Worbis
	Semi-finals	2–3	Canada		Leyva, Mora
	Third place match	4–1	Argentina		Leyva, Mora, Moreno, Rosales
(Greece) 2004 Summer Olympics	Group stage	1–1	China		Domínguez
		0–2	Germany	2 / 3	
	Quarter-finals	0–5	Brazil		
(United States) 2006 Gold Cup	Group stage	3–0	Trinidad and Tobago		Domínguez, González, P. Pérez
	Semi-finals	0–2	United States		
	Third place match	3–0	Jamaica		Ocampo 2, Domínguez
(Japan) (Mexico) 2007 World Cup qualification	AFC-CONCACAF play-off	0–2 2–1	Japan		Domínguez, Leyva
(Brazil) 2007 Pan American Games	Group stage	5–0	Paraguay		Corral 2, Ocampo 2, Valdez
		0–1	Argentina		
		2–0	Panama		Worbis 2
		3–2	United States U20		López 2, Worbis
	Semi-finals	0–2	Brazil		
	Third place match	1–2	Canada		Worbis
(Mexico) 2008 Summer Olympics qualification	Group stage	8–1	Jamaica		López 4, Morales 2, Ocampo, Worbis
		1–3	United States	2 / 3	Worbis
	Semi-finals	0–1	Canada		
(Mexico) 2010 Gold Cup	Group stage	7–2	Guyana		Domínguez 4, Garza, Worbis
		2–0	Trinidad and Tobago		Domínguez, López
		0–3	Canada	2 / 4	
	Semi-finals	2–1	United States		Domínguez, V. Pérez
	Final	0–1	Canada		
(Germany) 2011 World Cup	Group stage	1–1	England		Ocampo
		0–4	Japan		
		2–2	New Zealand	3 / 4	Domínguez, Mayor
(Mexico) 2011 Pan American Games	Group stage	0–0	Chile		
		1–1	Trinidad and Tobago		Domínguez
		1–0	Colombia	2 / 4	V. Pérez
	Semi-finals	0–1	Brazil		
	Third place match	1–0	Colombia		Ruiz
(Mexico) 2012 Summer Olympics qualification	Group stage	5–0	Guatemala		Domínguez 3, Diaz, Garza
		7–0	Dominican Republic		Guajardo 3, Diaz, Ruiz, Saucedo
		0–4	United States	2 / 4	
	Semi-finals	1–3	Canada		V. Pérez
(United States) 2014 CONCACAF Women's Championship	Group stage	0–1	Costa Rica		
		10–0	Martinique		Samarzich, Duarte 2, Mayor, Guillou (o.g.), Garciamendez, Garza, Ocampo 2, Noyola
		3–1	Jamaica	2 / 4	Mayor, Corral 2
	Semi-finals	0–3	United States		
	Third place match	4–2	Trinidad and Tobago		Mayor, Ocampo, Corral 2
(Mexico) 2014 Central American and Caribbean Games	Group stage	1–1	Colombia		Corral
		6–0	Trinidad and Tobago		Corral 4, Domínguez, Jaramillo
		1–0	Haiti	1 / 4	Mayor
	Semi-finals	0–1	Costa Rica		Pérez
	Gold medal match	0–2	Colombia		Corral, Domínguez
(Canada) 2015 World Cup	Group stage	1–1	Colombia		V. Pérez
		1–2	England		Ibarra
		0–5	France	4 / 4	
(Canada) 2015 Pan American Games	Group stage	0–1	Colombia		
		3–1	Argentina		Noyola, Rangel, Ruiz
		3–1	Trinidad and Tobago	2 / 4	Mayor 2, Ocampo
	Semi-finals	2–4	Brazil		Romero, Rangel
	Third place match	2–0	Canada		Ocampo, Mayor
(United States) 2016 Summer Olympics qualification	Group stage	6–0	Puerto Rico		Domínguez 3, Garciamendez, Rangel, Johnson
		0–1	United States		
		1–2	Costa Rica	3 / 4	Domínguez
(Colombia) 2018 Central American and Caribbean Games	Group stage	5–1	Trinidad and Tobago		Ocampo 2, Corral, Johnson, Robles
		3–0	Haiti		
		0–4	Nicaragua	1 / 4	Sánchez, Johnson, Corral, Monsiváis
	Semi-finals	3–1	Venezuela		Ocampo, Sánchez, Franco
	Gold medal match	1–3	Costa Rica		Corral, Robles, Johnson
(United States) 2018 CONCACAF Women's Championship	Group stage	0–6	United States		
		4–1	Trinidad and Tobago		Corral 2, Johnson, Sánchez
		0–2	Panama	3 / 4	
(Peru) 2019 Pan American Games	Group stage	2–0	Jamaica		Palacios, Corral
		1–2	Paraguay		Mayor
		2–2	Colombia	3 / 4	Caracas (o.g.), Corral
	Fifth place match	5–1	Panama		Ovalle 2, Rodriguez, Mayor, Martínez
(United States) 2020 Summer Olympics qualification	Group stage	1–0	Jamaica		Cuéllar
		6–0	Saint Kitts and Nevis		Palacios, López, Mayor, Cuéllar 2, Mercado
		0–2	Canada	2 / 4	
	Semi-finals	0–4	United States		
(Mexico) 2022 CONCACAF W Championship qualification	Group stage	9–0	Suriname		Mayor, Martínez 2, García, Bernal, Jaramillo, Reyes, Cervantes
		0–8	Antigua and Barbuda		Mayor 2, Bernal, Cervantes, Martínez, Reyes, Jaramillo, Delgadillo
		0–11	(Jamaica) Anguilla		Cervantes 3, Reyes, Mayor, Montero, Ordóñez 2, López, Martínez
		6–0	Puerto Rico	1 / 5	Ovalle 2, Martínez, Delgadillo, Ordóñez, Sánchez
(Mexico) 2022 CONCACAF W Championship	Group stage	0–1	Jamaica		
		3–0	Haiti		
		1–0	United States	4 / 4	
(El Salvador) 2023 Central American and Caribbean Games	Group stage	4–0	Puerto Rico		Casarez 2, Espinoza, Palacios
		2–3	El Salvador		Casarez 2, Burkenroad
		3–7	Jamaica	1 / 4	Espinoza, Corral, Palacios 2, Mayor 2, Burkenroad
	Semi-finals	3–1	Centro Caribe Sports		Burkenroad, Palacios, Ovalle, Espinoza, Zuazua, Corral
	Gold medal match	1–2	Venezuela		Mayor, Mauleón
(Chile) 2023 Pan American Games	Group stage	7–0	Jamaica		Sánchez 2, Nieto, Palacios, Ordóñez, Cervantes, Corral
		1–3	Chile		Bernal, Sánchez, Ordóñez
		4–1	Paraguay	1 / 4	Camberos, Ordóñez, Sánchez, Ovalle
	Semi-finals	2–0	Argentina		Ovalle 2
	Gold medal match	1–0	Chile		Bernal
(United States) 2026 CONCACAF W Championship qualification	Group stage	0–14	Saint Vincent and the Grenadines		Corral 7, Ovalle 3, Camberos, Soto, Saldívar, Sánchez
		0–7	Saint Lucia		Bernal, Corral 2, Marquis (o.g.), Delgado, Hernández, Ordóñez
		9–0	(United States Virgin Islands) U.S. Virgin Islands		Sánchez 4, Corral 2, Rodríguez, Camberos, Palacios
		6–0	Puerto Rico	1 / 5	Delgado, González (o.g.), Camberos, Palacios, Corral

== Results and fixtures ==
The following is a list of match results in the last 12 months, as well as any future matches that have been scheduled.

Legend

Win Draw Loss Fixture

=== 2025 ===
29 November 2026 CONCACAF W Championship Q	Saint Vincent and the Grenadines	0–14	Mexico	Kingstown, Saint Vincent and the Grenadines
19:00 UTC−4		Report	Corral 6', 22', 45', 61', 86', 90', 90+3'; Ovalle 14', 57', 65'; Camberos 25'; Soto 55'; Saldívar 73'; Sánchez 75'	Stadium: Arnos Vale Stadium; Referee: Merlin Soto (Honduras)

2 December Friendly	Costa Rica	0–2	Mexico	Alajuela, Costa Rica
18:00 UTC−6		Report	Soto 68'; Ordóñez 90+3'	Stadium: Complejo Deportivo FEDEFUTBOL Plycem

=== 2026 ===
2 March 2026 CONCACAF W Championship Q	Saint Lucia	0–7	Mexico	Gros Islet, Saint Lucia
15:00 UTC−4		Report	Bernal 18'; Corral 26', 64'; Marquis 52' (o.g.); Delgado 70'; Hernández 87'; Ordóñez 90+5'	Stadium: Daren Sammy Cricket Ground; Referee: Cecile Hinds (Trinidad and Tobago)

7 March Friendly	Mexico	1–0	Brazil	Mexico City, Mexico
17:00 UTC−6	Espinoza 76'	Report		Stadium: Estadio Ciudad de los Deportes; Attendance: 24,876; Referee: Carly Shaw-MacLaren (Canada)

10 April 2026 CONCACAF W Championship Q	Mexico	9–0	U.S. Virgin Islands	Zacatecas, Mexico
19ː00 UTC−6	Sánchez 5', 19', 32', 45+5'; Corral 9', 25' (pen.); Rodríguez 29'; Camberos 39'; Palacios 82'	Report		Stadium: Estadio Carlos Vega Villalba; Attendance: 18,735; Referee: Deily Gómez (Costa Rica)

18 April 2026 CONCACAF W Championship Q	Mexico	6–0	Puerto Rico	Toluca, Mexico
18:00 UTC−6	Delgado 11'; González 32' (o.g.); Camberos 39'; Palacios 59'; Corral 63', 86'	Report		Stadium: Estadio Nemesio Diez; Attendance: 18,726; Referee: Natalie Simon (United States)

6 June Friendly	Australia	0–1	Mexico	Newcastle, Australia
19:15 UTC+10		Report	Ordóñez 90+2'	Stadium: McDonald Jones Stadium; Attendance: 23,167; Referee: Lorraine Watson (Scotland)

9 June Friendly	Australia	3–1	Mexico	Sydney, Australia
19:00 UTC+10	Kennedy 22'; Barreras 36' (o.g.); Foord 70'	Report	Ordóñez 26'	Stadium: CommBank Stadium; Attendance: 18,441; Referee: Stacey Pearson (England)

9 October Friendly	Mexico	3–4	Jamaica	Aguascalientes, Mexico
19:00 UTC−6	Ovalle 29'; Bernal 45'; Corral 90+5'	Report	Brown 15'; Shaw 20'; Blackwood 36' (pen.); Washington 90'	Stadium: Estadio Victoria; Referee: Sandra Benítez (El Salvador)

13 October Friendly	Mexico	3–1	Jamaica	Querétaro, Mexico
19:00 UTC−6	Spencer 6' (o.g.); Reyes 32'; Ovalle 58'	Report	Van Zanten 60'	Stadium: Estadio Corregidora; Referee: Janeishka Cabán (Puerto Rico)

28 November 2026 CONCACAF W Championship QF	Mexico	v	Haiti	Mansfield, United States
15:30 UTC−6		Report		Stadium: Texas Health Mansfield Stadium

See Also

- Historical results (1923–present) – FMF.mx
- Fixtures and Results – Soccerway.com

== Coaching staff ==
=== Current coaching staff ===
As of 15 September 2022

Position	Name
Head coach	(Spain) Pedro López
Assistant coach	(Spain) Gabriel García
Goalkeeping coach	(Mexico) Lauro Muñóz
Fitness coaches	(Spain) Fran de Alba
Fitness coaches	(Mexico) Javier Esquer
Video analyst	(Mexico) Guillermo Fontes
Physiotherapists	(Mexico) Beatriz Olmedo
Physiotherapists	(Mexico) Alexia Meouchi
Physiotherapists	(Mexico) Jessyca García
Doctor	(Mexico) Alejandra González

=== Manager history ===
- Winning percentages calculated according to FIFA's points scale, which provides 3 points for a victory, 1 point for a draw, and 0 points for a loss.

As of 13 October 2026, after the match against Jamaica.

#	Name	Period	Matches	Wins	Draws	Losses	Effectiveness %	Notes
1	Gil Monterd	1991–1998	12	5	2	5	47.2%	
2	Leonardo Cuéllar	1998–2016	144	58	16	70	43.9%	
3	Roberto Medina	2016–2018	25	11	0	14	44%	
4	Christopher Cuéllar	2019–2020	20	6	5	9	38.3%	
5	Mónica Vergara	2021–2022	20	10	3	7	55%	
6	Pedro López	2022–present	54	37	9	8	76.85%	

1. Gil Monterd (1991–1998):
As La Tri's first official coach between 1991 and 1998, Monterd took an inexperienced and under-resourced squad to the 1991 CONCACAF Women's Championship in Port-au-Prince, Haiti. Sending only one qualifier from the confederation to the 1991 FIFA Women's World Cup, this tournament fielded eight teams divided into two groups. Matches were also only 80 minutes long. In Group A, Mexico lost to eventual winner United States 12–0, its worst ever appearance. With a loss against Trinidad and Tobago and a win against Martinique, Mexico finished third in the group, failing to advance to the semifinals. Likewise, during the 1994 CONCACAF Women's Championship, which determined the two qualifiers for the 1995 FIFA Women's World Cup, Mexico finished in third place, failing to reach the international tournament yet again.

2. Leonardo Cuéllar (1998–2016):
Once a highly touted player for the Mexico men's national football team, Cuéllar took over El Tri Femenil after a brief stint as the women's soccer coach at CSULA. Head coach until 2016—a period of 18 years—Cuéllar had a questionable record. As head coach, Mexico only qualified for the world cup on three occasions and the Olympics once; his teams never won a single game in any major tournament, nor did they finish first in the CONCACAF Women's Gold Cup. Common criticism of his leadership was his nepotism and overreliance on US-born players. Cuéllar was never at risk of losing his job despite dubious results, and he even hired close allies, including his son Christopher Cuéllar. He also regularly held tryouts in the United States without doing the same in Mexico.

Initially charged with taking the squad to the 1998 CONCACAF Women's Championship, which would award 1.5 qualification slots to the 1999 Women's World Cup, he was successful in qualifying for the team's first ever appearance at the official tournament. Finishing first in its group and winning against Guatemala in the semifinal, Mexico eventually fell 1–0 to Canada in the final. Mexico went on to qualify for the cup after defeating Argentina in the CONCACAF-CONMEBOL playoff match. Cuéllar was very lucky to qualify. The tournament expanded from 12 teams to 16 teams and the United States was the host, so their squad automatically qualified; had these two changes not been made, Mexico would have likely been out.

Cuéllar went on to schedule friendlies and participate in organized tournaments, but with few victories. The team qualified for 2011 and 2015, but his coaching style remained consistent. Frustration grew among his players after his call-ups involved much controversy. As players like Charlyn Corral and Kenti Robles demanded change, Cuéllar began to omit them from future squads. Likewise, he discriminated against Stephany Mayor and Bianca Sierra for being in a relationship, leading to their infrequent call-ups as well. His reign eventually ended when Mexico failed to qualify for the 2016 Summer Olympics.

3. Roberto Medina (2016–2018):
Promoted from U-20 squad to the senior team without any official announcement from the FMF, Medina served as head coach from 2016 to 2018. With few victories—including a 3–0 win against Venezuela early in his tenure, his technique was essentially a continuation of Cuéllar's style. Though he was praised after Mexico won the gold during the 2018 Central American and Caribbean Games, he was relieved of his position after failing to advance out of the group stage during the 2018 CONCACAF Women's Championship. With losses to Panama and the United States, Mexico did not qualify for the 2019 FIFA Women's World Cup despite having the Liga MX Femenil and the most talented generation it had seen up until this point. Historically weaker teams, such as Jamaica and Panama, advanced further than the squad, signifying that other teams had surpassed Mexico. After his ouster, he became head coach of Tigres. Medina had been the U-20 coach one other time, but elected to coach a men's team just before a world cup.

4. Christopher Cuéllar (2019–2020):
With no official announcement, Cuéllar Jr. replaced Medina after the team failed to qualify for 2019. Cuéllar, the son of Leonardo Cuéllar, was promoted after serving as the U-20 women's squad coach. Like his predecessors, Cuéllar Jr. has had limited results. During the 2019 Pan American Games, La Tri finished in fifth place after failing to advance beyond the group stage despite the absence of both the United States and Canada. Throughout his first 21 games as DT, the team has had 6 victories, 5 draws, and 10 losses. Their best win has been against the Czech Republic, then ranked 28th in the world (with whom they've also tied), whereas their worst loss was against Paraguay, ranked 48th. Despite upcoming dates like the 2018 FIFA U-20 Women's World Cup, Cuéllar Jr. was seen working with men's teams. #FueraCuellar has trended on Twitter multiple times. On January 18, 2021, the FMF announced that Cuéllar was relieved of his duties as head coach, nearly a year after the team's last match.

5. Mónica Vergara (2021–2022):
On January 19, 2021, the FMF formally announced Vergara as the full team's head coach. Prior to rising to the highest level, Vergara was an assistant coach and eventually head coach for each of the U-15, U-17, and U-20 squads. She led the U-15 team to the bronze medal at the 2014 Youth Olympic Games in Nanjing, China. She also led the U-17 team to a second-place finish at the 2018 FIFA U-17 Women's World Cup, the best result of any Mexican women's team at a world cup. Vergara also led the U-20 squad to a second-place finish of the 2020 CONCACAF Women's U-20 Championship to qualify for the 2020 FIFA U-20 Women's World Cup, but the event was postponed by a year before eventually being canceled due to the COVID-19 pandemic. Vergara's hiring has coincided with increased engagement from the Federation. The women's national team now has its own social media accounts, and the team has scheduled more friendlies during FIFA dates. In addition, she has recruited more players from the Liga MX Femenil. All of these were great signs for this growing team, which qualified for the 2022 CONCACAF W Championship. However, during the competition Mexico performed poorly, and were eliminated from the group stage without a goal or a win and didn't qualify for the 2023 FIFA Women's World Cup. On August 15, 2022, the FMF announced that Vergara was relieved of her duties as head coach, a month after the CONCACAF W Championship.

6. Pedro López (2022–present):
López was named as head coach on September 15, 2022 by Andrea Rodebaugh, the federation's national director of women's teams. Prior to his tenure with Mexico, he served as head coach for Spain U-20, which won the 2022 FIFA U-20 Women's World Cup and came in second during the 2018 FIFA U-20 Women's World Cup. His U-19 Spanish Squad won the 2022 UEFA Women's Under-19 Championship. He was an assistant for the squad that won the 2018 FIFA U-17 Women's World Cup as well as for the winners of the UEFA Women's Under-17 Championship in 2010, 2011, 2015, and 2018. For the U-19 team, he served as assistant during their victories in the 2017 and 2018 editions of the UEFA Women's Under-19 Championship. In his debut with Mexico, the squad earned a draw against Chile. His first victory with the team came against Nigeria. López led Mexico to its first-ever gold medal in the 2023 Panamerican Games after leading them to their third gold medal in the 2023 Central American and Caribbean Games. López also guided the team in its second-ever victory over the United States during the 2024 CONCACAF Women's Gold Cup. López's team went undefeated for the first 23 games before falling to Brazil in the semifinals of that same tournament.

== Players ==
=== Current squad ===
The following 23 players were named to the squad for the 2026 CONCACAF W Championship.

Caps, goals, and player numbers accurate as of 9 June 2026 after second match vs. Jamaica.

No.	Pos.	Player	Date of birth (age)	Caps	Goals	Club
1	GK	Itzel Velasco	23 September 2004 (aged 22)	2	0	(Mexican Football Federation) América
12	GK	Blanca Félix	25 March 1996 (aged 30)	3	0	(Mexican Football Federation) Guadalajara
21	GK	Esthefanny Barreras	2 November 1996 (aged 30)	34	0	(Mexican Football Federation) Pachuca
2	DF	Kenti Robles	15 February 1991 (aged 35)	115	3	(Mexican Football Federation) Pachuca
4	DF	Rebeca Bernal	31 August 1997 (aged 29)	82	10	(The Football Association) Manchester United
6	DF	Reyna Reyes	16 February 2001 (aged 25)	29	0	(United States Soccer Federation) Portland Thorns
13	DF	Ana Mendoza	7 August 2005 (aged 21)	3	0	(Mexican Football Federation) UNAM
17	DF	Alexandra Godínez	16 May 2003 (aged 23)	1	0	(Mexican Football Federation) Monterrey
23	DF	Kimberly Rodríguez	26 March 1999 (aged 27)	36	2	(Mexican Football Federation) América
3	MF	Aaliyah Farmer	27 October 2003 (aged 23)	5	1	(United States Soccer Federation) Chicago Stars
7	MF	Alice Soto	26 March 2006 (aged 20)	21	8	(Mexican Football Federation) Monterrey
8	MF	Alexia Delgado	9 December 1999 (aged 26)	62	5	(Mexican Football Federation) Tigres UANL
11	MF	Lizbeth Ovalle	19 October 1999 (aged 27)	72	27	(United States Soccer Federation) Orlando Pride
14	MF	Maricarmen Reyes	23 April 2000 (aged 26)	15	8	(Mexican Football Federation) Tigres UANL
16	MF	Karla Nieto	9 January 1995 (aged 31)	71	1	(Mexican Football Federation) Pachuca
18	MF	Nancy Antonio	2 April 1996 (aged 30)	27	1	(Mexican Football Federation) América
19	MF	Montserrat Saldívar	20 September 2006 (aged 20)	15	3	(Mexican Football Federation) América
5	FW	Scarlett Camberos	20 November 2000 (aged 26)	32	7	(Mexican Football Federation) América
9	FW	Charlyn Corral	11 September 1991 (aged 35)	87	47	(Mexican Football Federation) Pachuca
10	FW	Kiana Palacios	1 October 1996 (aged 30)	60	15	(United States Soccer Federation) Utah Royals
15	FW	Jasmine Casarez	7 January 1997 (aged 29)	26	6	(Mexican Football Federation) Guadalajara
20	FW	Nicolette Hernández	17 February 1999 (aged 27)	34	1	(United States Soccer Federation) Boston Legacy
22	FW	Diana Ordóñez	26 September 2001 (aged 25)	40	16	(Mexican Football Federation) Tigres UANL

=== Recent call-ups ===
The following players were called up to a squad within the last 12 months.

Pos.	Player	Date of birth (age)	Caps	Goals	Club	Latest call-up
GK	Itzel Velasco	23 September 2004 (age 22)	2	0	(Mexico) América	June 2026 friendlies vs Australia
GK	Cecilia Santiago	19 October 1994 (age 32)	66	0	(Mexico) Tigres UANL	April 2026 CONCACAF W Championship qualification matches vs. U.S. Virgin Islands and Puerto Rico
DF	Ivonne Gutiérrez	14 December 2002 (age 23)	6	0	(Mexico) Cruz Azul	June 2026 friendlies vs Australia
DF	Karol Bernal	2 February 2003 (age 23)	12	0	(Mexico) América	June 2026 friendlies vs Australia
DF	Greta Espinoza	5 June 1995 (age 31)	64	5	(Mexico) Tigres UANL	June 2026 friendlies vs Australia
MF	Fátima Servín	17 May 2005 (age 21)	11	1	(Mexico) Monterrey	June 2026 friendlies vs Australia
MF	Stephany Mayor	23 September 1991 (age 35)	115	24	(Mexico) Tigres UANL	April 2026 CONCACAF W Championship qualification matches vs. U.S. Virgin Islands and Puerto Rico
MF	Nicole Pérez	30 August 2001 (age 25)	19	4	(Mexico) Monterrey	April 2026 CONCACAF W Championship qualification matches vs. U.S. Virgin Islands and Puerto Rico
FW	María Sánchez	20 February 1996 (age 30)	72	15	(Mexico) Tigres UANL	June 2026 friendlies vs Australia
FW	Nina Nicosia	23 February 2003 (age 23)	0	0	(Mexico) Pachuca	June 2026 friendlies vs Australia
FW	Myra Delgadillo	9 December 1995 (age 30)	27	3	(Mexico) Tigres UANL	April 2026 CONCACAF W Championship qualification matches vs. U.S. Virgin Islands and Puerto Rico
Notes: ^{INJ} = Not part of the current squad due to injury; ^{PRE} = Preliminary squad/standby; ^{SUS} = Serving suspension; ^{WD} = The player withdrew from the current squad due to non-injury issue

=== Notable players ===
- Charlyn Corral: First Mexican women's player to win the Pichichi Trophy.
- Maribel Dominguez: Mexico's top international goal scorer of all time, among both men's and women's squads, earning her the nickname "Marigol."
- Mónica Ocampo: Scored a goal England at the 2011 World Cup, which was selected by fans as the greatest Women's World Cup goal ever.
- Kenti Robles: Winner of the 2019 Trofeo EFE.
- Andrea Rodebaugh: Sporting director for Mexico's women's teams.
- Cecilia Santiago: Youngest goalkeeper ever to appear in a Men's or Women's World Cup.
- Alicia Vargas: In 1999, she was named third best woman player of the century by CONCACAF.

== Records ==
*Players in bold are still active, at least at club level.

As of 7 July 2023

=== Most capped players ===
Most caps
Rank	Player	Caps	Goals	Career
1	Maribel Domínguez	116	82	1998–2016
2	Lupita Worbis	115	20	2003–2013
3	**Stephany Mayor**	109	27	2006–
4	Luz Saucedo	106	2	2003–2016
5	Evelyn López	102	14	2004–2011
6	**Kenti Robles**	98	3	2010–
7	Marlene Sandoval	85	5	2002–2016
8	**Verónica Pérez**	84	9	2010–2016
9	Mónica González	83	10	1998–2011
10	**Nayeli Rangel**	81	7	2012–2019

=== Top goalscorers ===
Most goals
Rank	Player	Goals	Caps	Career	Ratio
1	Maribel Domínguez	82	116	1998–2016	0.71
2	**Charlyn Corral**	35	70	2008–	0.5
3	**Stephany Mayor**	27	109	2006–	0.25
4	Lupita Worbis	20	115	2003–2013	0.17
5	**Jacqueline Ovalle**	14	45	2018–	0.31
6	**María Sánchez**	14	52	2015–	0.27
7	**Mónica Ocampo**	14	77	2010–20	0.18
8	Evelyn López	14	102	2004–2011	0.14
9	**Kiana Palacios**	11	41	2017 –	0.27
10	**Renae Cuéllar**	10	39	2008–2019	0.27

== Competitive record ==
Source: miseleccion.mx

=== FIFA Women's World Cup ===
FIFA Women's World Cup record										Qualification record					
Year	Result	Position	Pld	W	D*	L	GF	GA	Squad	Pld	W	D	L	GF	GA
(China) 1991	Did not qualify									3	1	0	2	9	16
(Sweden) 1995	Did not qualify									4	1	1	2	6	19
(United States) 1999	Group stage	16th	3	0	0	3	1	15	Squad	7	5	1	1	26	9
(United States) 2003	Did not qualify									7	3	1	3	13	11
(China) 2007	Did not qualify									7	5	0	2	8	5
(Germany) 2011	Group stage	11th	3	0	2	1	3	7	Squad	5	3	0	2	11	7
(Canada) 2015	Group stage	22nd	3	0	1	2	2	8	Squad	5	3	0	2	17	7
(France) 2019	Did not qualify									3	1	0	2	4	9
(Australia) (New Zealand) 2023	Did not qualify									3	0	0	3	0	5
(Brazil) 2027	To be determined									To be determined					
(Costa Rica) (Jamaica) (Mexico) (United States) 2031	Qualified as co-host									Qualified as co-host					
(United Kingdom) 2035	To be determined									To be determined					
Total	Group stage	3/9	9	0	3	6	6	30	—	44	22	3	19	94	88

FIFA Women's World Cup history
First match	Brazil 7–1 Mexico (19 June 1999; East Rutherford, United States)
Biggest win	—
Biggest defeat	Brazil 7–1 Mexico (19 June 1999; East Rutherford, United States)
Best result	—
Worst result	Group stage (1999, 2011, 2015)

*Draws include knockout matches decided on penalty kicks.

=== Olympic Games ===
Summer Olympics record										Qualifying record					
Year	Result	Position	Pld	W	D*	L	GF	GA	Squad	Pld	W	D	L	GF	GA
(United States) 1996	Did not qualify									1995 FIFA WWC					
(Australia) 2000	Did not qualify									1999 FIFA WWC					
(Greece) 2004	Quarter-finals	8th	3	0	1	2	1	8	Squad	5	3	0	2	17	6
(China) 2008	Did not qualify									4	1	0	3	9	6
(United Kingdom) 2012	Did not qualify									4	2	0	2	13	7
(Brazil) 2016	Did not qualify									3	1	0	2	7	3
(Japan) 2020	Did not qualify									4	2	0	2	7	6
(France) 2024	Did not qualify									3	0	0	3	0	5
(United States) 2028	To be determined									To be determined					
Total	Quarter-finals	1/8	3	0	1	2	1	8	—	23	9	0	14	53	33

*Draws include knockout matches decided on penalty kicks.

=== CONCACAF W Championship ===
CONCACAF W Championship record										Qualification record					
Year	Result	Position	Pld	W	D*	L	GF	GA	Squad	Pld	W	D	L	GF	GA
(Haiti) 1991	Group stage	5th	3	1	0	2	9	16	Squad	Qualified automatically					
(United States) 1993	Did not enter									Did not enter					
(Canada) 1994	Third place	3rd	4	1	1	2	6	19	Squad	Qualified automatically					
(Canada) 1998	Runners-up	2nd	5	3	1	1	20	6	Squad	Qualified automatically					
(United States) 2000	Group stage	5th	3	1	0	2	10	7	Squad	Qualified automatically					
(Canada) (United States) 2002	Third place	3rd	5	3	0	2	11	7	Squad	Qualified automatically					
(United States) 2006	Third place	3rd	3	2	0	1	6	2	Squad	2	2	0	0	17	0
(Mexico) 2010	Runners-up	2nd	5	3	0	2	11	7	Squad	Qualified as host					
(United States) 2014	Third place	3rd	5	3	0	2	17	7	Squad	Qualified automatically					
(United States) 2018	Group stage	6th	3	1	0	2	4	9	Squad	Qualified automatically					
(Mexico) 2022	Group stage	7th	3	0	0	3	0	5	Squad	4	4	0	0	34	0
(United States) 2026	Qualified									4	4	0	0	36	0
Total	Runners-up	11/12	39	18	2	19	94	85	—	10	10	0	0	87	0

CONCACAF W Championship history
First match	United States 12–0 Mexico (18 April 1991; Port-au-Prince, Haiti)
Biggest win	Martinique 0–10 Mexico (18 October 2014; Bridgeview, United States)
Biggest defeat	United States 12–0 Mexico (18 April 1991; Port-au-Prince, Haiti)
Best result	Runners-up (1998, 2010)
Worst result	Group stage (1991, 2000, 2018, 2022)

*Draws include knockout matches decided on penalty kicks.

=== CONCACAF W Gold Cup ===
CONCACAF W Gold Cup record										Qualification record							
Year	Result	Position	Pld	W	D*	L	GF	GA	Squad	Division	Group	Pld	W	D	L	GF	GA
(United States) 2024	Semi-finals	4th	5	3	1	1	13	5	Squad	A	A	4	4	0	0	12	1
(N/A) 2029	To be determined									To be determined							
Total	Semi-finals	1/1	5	3	1	1	13	5	—	—	—	4	4	0	0	12	1

CONCACAF W Gold Cup history
First match	Mexico 0–0 Argentina (20 February 2024; Carson, United States)
Biggest win	Dominican Republic 0–8 Mexico (24 February 2024; Carson, United States)
Biggest defeat	Brazil 3–0 Mexico (6 March 2024; San Diego, United States)
Best result	Semi-finals (2024)
Worst result	—

*Draws include knockout matches decided on penalty kicks.

=== Pan American Games ===
Pan American Games record
Year	Result	Position	Pld	W	D*	L	GF	GA	Squad
(Canada) 1999	Silver medal	2nd	6	3	1	2	15	9	Squad
(Dominican Republic) 2003	Bronze medal	3rd	4	3	0	1	10	5	Squad
(Brazil) 2007	Fourth place	4th	5	3	0	2	6	1	Squad
(Mexico) 2011	Bronze medal	3rd	5	2	2	1	3	2	Squad
(Canada) 2015	Bronze medal	3rd	5	3	0	2	10	7	Squad
(Peru) 2019	Fifth place	5th	4	2	1	1	10	5	Squad
(Chile) 2023	Gold medal	1st	5	5	0	0	17	2	Squad
(Peru) 2027	To be determined								
Total	1 Gold medal	7/7	34	21	4	9	81	31	—

*Draws include knockout matches decided on penalty kicks.

=== Central American and Caribbean Games ===
Central American and Caribbean Games record
Year	Result	Position	Pld	W	D*	L	GF	GA
(Puerto Rico) 2010	Withdrew							
(Mexico) 2014	Gold medal	1st	5	4	1	0	11	1
(Colombia) 2018	Gold medal	1st	5	5	0	0	18	3
(El Salvador) 2023	Gold medal	1st	5	5	0	0	22	6
(Dominican Republic) 2026	Gold medal	1st	5	3	2	0	13	2
Total	4 Gold medals	4/5	20	17	3	0	64	12

*Draws include knockout matches decided on penalty kicks.

=== Algarve Cup ===
Algarve Cup record
Year	Result	Matches	Wins	Draws	Losses	GF	GA	GD
2005 Algarve Cup	9th place	4	2	1	1	5	7	−2
2006 Algarve Cup	8th place	3	1	1	1	9	4	+5
2013 Algarve Cup	8th place	4	2	0	2	4	4	0

=== Other Tournaments ===
Tournaments record
Year	Result	Matches	Wins	Draws	Losses	GF	GA	GD
2015 Cyprus Women's Cup	3rd place	4	3	1	0	6	2	+4
2017 Yongchuan International Tournament	4th place	3	0	0	3	2	7	−5
2018 Turkish Women's Cup	Runners-up	4	3	0	1	12	3	+9
2020 Cyprus Women's Cup	3rd place	3	0	3	0	3	3	0
2023 Women's Revelations Cup	Champions	3	1	2	0	3	2	+1
2025 Pinatar Cup	Runners-up	3	2	0	1	6	2	+4

== Honours ==
=== Major competitions ===
- CONCACAF W Championship

Runners-up (2): 1998, 2010
Third place (4): 1994, 2002, 2006, 2014

=== Other competitions ===
Intercontinental

- Pan American Games

Gold medalists (1): 2023
Silver medalists (1): 1999
Bronze medalists (3): 2003, 2011, 2015

Regional

- Central American and Caribbean Games

Gold medalists (3): 2014, 2018, 2023

== FIFA World Rankings ==
A line chart depicting the history of the Mexico's year-end placements in the FIFA Women's World Ranking. View source data.

Last update was on 11 December 2025: Source:

Best Ranking Worst Ranking Best Mover Worst Mover

Mexico's FIFA World Ranking History
Rank	Year	Best		Worst	
Rank	Year	Rank	Move	Rank	Move
	2026	27	▲2	28	▼1
29	2025	29	▲2	29	Steady
31	2024	31	▲4	35	Steady
35	2023	34	▲1	36	▼1
35	2022	26	▲1	36	▼10
27	2021	27	▲1	28	Steady
28	2020	27	▲1	28	▼1
26	2019	26	▲1	27	▼1
27	2018	24	▲1	27	▼3
26	2017	26	Steady	26	Steady
26	2016	26	Steady	27	▼1
26	2015	25	Steady	26	▼1
25	2014	25	Steady	25	Steady
25	2013	24	Steady	25	▼1
24	2012	22	Steady	24	▼2
21	2011	21	▲1	22	Steady
22	2010	22	Steady	22	Steady
22	2009	22	▲1	23	▼1
22	2008	22	Steady	22	Steady
22	2007	22	Steady	22	Steady
22	2006	22	▲3	26	Steady
26	2005	25	Steady	26	▼1
25	2004	25	▲5	26	▼1
30	2003	30	▲2	31	Steady

== See also ==
- Sport in Mexico
  - Football in Mexico
    - Women's football in Mexico
- Mexican Football Federation (FMF)

National teams
Women's

- Mexico women's national football team
  - Mexico women's national football team results
  - List of Mexico women's international footballers
  - List of Mexico women's national football team managers
- Mexico women's national under-20 football team
- Mexico women's national under-17 football team

Men's

- Mexico national football team

League system

- Mexican football league system
- Liga MX Femenil
- Liga Mexicana de Fútbol Femenil
