= 2022 CONCACAF Women's U-20 Championship squads =

List of the squads for the 2022 CONCACAF Women's U-20 Championship

This is a list of the squads for the 2022 CONCACAF Women's U-20 Championship in the Dominican Republic between February 25 and March 12, 2022. The 20 national teams involved in the tournament were required to register a squad of 20 players each, two of whom must be goalkeepers; only players in these squads were eligible to take part in the tournament. Players born on or after 1 January 2002 are eligible to compete.

Players marked (c) were named as captain for their national squad.

== Group E ==
=== Dominican Republic ===
Coach: (Spain) José Benito Rubido

No.	Pos.	Player	Date of birth (age)	Club
1	GK	Odaliana Gómez	16 June 2004 (aged 17)	(United States Soccer Federation) Matchfit FC
12	GK	Paloma Peña	20 February 2005 (aged 17)	(United States Soccer Federation) FC Prime
2	DF	Isabella Ventura	14 November 2006 (aged 15)	(United States Soccer Federation) FC Prime
3	DF	Nadia Colón	8 September 2002 (aged 19)	(United States Soccer Federation) University of Texas Rio Grande Valley
4	DF	Gabriella Marte	27 January 2003 (aged 19)	(United States Soccer Federation) Penn Fusion Soccer Academy
5	DF	Karla Muñiz	14 January 2002 (aged 20)	(United States Soccer Federation) Santa Fe FC
14	DF	Paola Then	15 April 2004 (aged 17)	(United States Soccer Federation) Santa Fe FC
17	DF	Alexa Pacheco	6 November 2002 (aged 19)	(United States Soccer Federation) Goldey–Beacom College
6	MF	Keisla Gil	12 July 2003 (aged 18)	(Dominican Football Federation) 5 de Abril
13	MF	Janine Díaz	6 July 2004 (aged 17)	(Dominican Football Federation) Cibao FC
15	MF	Jazmín Herrera	14 July 2005 (aged 16)	(United States Soccer Federation) FC Prime
16	MF	María Torreira	2 March 2006 (aged 15)	(United States Soccer Federation) Santa Fe FC
18	MF	Emely Pichardo	10 April 2004 (aged 17)	(United States Soccer Federation) Barton College
19	MF	Stephanie Espinal	9 January 2004 (aged 18)	(Dominican Football Federation) Cibao FC
7	FW	Angelina Vargas	6 July 2005 (aged 16)	(United States Soccer Federation) Players Development Academy
8	FW	Jazlyn Oviedo (c)	25 March 2002 (aged 19)	(United States Soccer Federation) Monmouth University
9	FW	Ariana Díaz	6 April 2005 (aged 16)	(United States Soccer Federation) East Meadow Soccer Club
10	FW	Jendy Matos	16 January 2003 (aged 19)	(Dominican Football Federation) Bob Soccer School FC
11	FW	Liliane Clase	29 July 2003 (aged 18)	(United States Soccer Federation) Angelina College
20	FW	Camila Morel	21 November 2002 (aged 19)	(Dominican Football Federation) Bob Soccer School FC

=== Nicaragua ===
Coach: (Nicaragua) Elna Dixon

No.	Pos.	Player	Date of birth (age)	Club
1	GK	Raquel García	29 December 2005 (aged 16)	(Nicaraguan Football Federation) Atlético Somotillo
12	GK	Mónica Mercado	31 March 2003 (aged 18)	(Nicaraguan Football Federation) Diriangén FC
2	DF	María Arvizu	8 January 2003 (aged 19)	(Nicaraguan Football Federation) UNAN Managua
6	DF	Vanessa Altamirano	3 July 2006 (aged 15)	(Nicaraguan Football Federation) Managua FC
8	DF	Aryeri Mejía	4 May 2004 (aged 17)	(Nicaraguan Football Federation) Masaya FC
13	DF	Ariana Munguia	12 May 2006 (aged 15)	(Nicaraguan Football Federation) Zacarias Guerra
15	DF	Ruth Zeledon	20 September 2003 (aged 18)	(Nicaraguan Football Federation) UNAN Managua
4	MF	Adriana Munguia	12 May 2006 (aged 15)	(Nicaraguan Football Federation) Masaya FC
5	MF	Edy Pérez	5 December 2002 (aged 19)	(Nicaraguan Football Federation) CD El 26
20	MF	Xiomara Errington	3 March 2004 (aged 17)	(Nicaraguan Football Federation) Masaya FC
3	FW	Onix Merlo	10 March 2002 (aged 19)	(Nicaraguan Football Federation) UNAN Managua
7	FW	Inés Navarrete	3 January 2004 (aged 18)	(Nicaraguan Football Federation) Juventus FC
9	FW	Niurka Molina	11 June 2003 (aged 18)	(Nicaraguan Football Federation) Atlético Somotillo
10	FW	Dayana Calero (c)	1 May 2002 (aged 19)	(Nicaraguan Football Federation) UNAN Managua
11	FW	Paola Maradiaga	29 December 2002 (aged 19)	(Nicaraguan Football Federation) Atlético Somotillo
14	FW	Leydin Mejía	10 June 2002 (aged 19)	(Nicaraguan Football Federation) UNAN Managua
16	FW	Massiel Hernández	12 February 2002 (aged 20)	(Nicaraguan Football Federation) Managua FC
17	FW	Meyling Acuña	2 November 2003 (aged 18)	(Nicaraguan Football Federation) Managua FC
18	FW	Rosa Mena	23 March 2003 (aged 18)	(Nicaraguan Football Federation) Las Leyendas
19	FW	Yuliana Alemán	23 February 2004 (aged 18)	(United States Soccer Federation) Real Miami CF

=== Puerto Rico ===
Coach: (Puerto Rico) Nat González

No.	Pos.	Player	Date of birth (age)	Club
1	GK	JLo Varada Vázquez (c)	2 February 2003 (aged 19)	(United States Soccer Federation) University of Florida
12	GK	Ariana Anderson	13 January 2005 (aged 17)	(United States Soccer Federation) Solar FC
2	DF	Iliana Pardo	24 July 2005 (aged 16)	(United States Soccer Federation) NC Courage Academy
5	DF	Estefanía González	12 May 2006 (aged 15)	(United States Soccer Federation) Montverde Academy
6	DF	Michelle Berndt	27 October 2003 (aged 18)	(United States Soccer Federation) Florida United
9	DF	María Sanabria Buono	13 November 2002 (aged 19)	(United States Soccer Federation) Nova Southeastern University
10	DF	Bryana Pizarro	29 August 2002 (aged 19)	(United States Soccer Federation) University of Oregon
18	DF	Natasha Soto	18 May 2003 (aged 18)	(United States Soccer Federation) Angelo State University
19	DF	Emma González	7 May 2004 (aged 17)	(United States Soccer Federation) Orange County SC
3	MF	Karish Rivera de Jesús	23 January 2003 (aged 19)	(Canadian Soccer Association) Caribbean Stars
7	MF	Ana Díaz	26 August 2002 (aged 19)	(United States Soccer Federation) Georgia Southwestern State University
15	MF	Laniaya del Valle	26 April 2004 (aged 17)	(United States Soccer Federation) FC Prime
17	MF	Marilia Nieves-Melchor	10 February 2006 (aged 16)	(United States Soccer Federation) Charlotte Soccer Academy
20	MF	Ivy Garner	7 May 2003 (aged 18)	(United States Soccer Federation) Liberty University
4	FW	Leyla Molina	16 April 2004 (aged 17)	(United States Soccer Federation) Sunrise Prime FC
8	FW	Indigo Sims	22 December 2005 (aged 16)	(United States Soccer Federation) D'Feeters Kicks Soccer Club
11	FW	Brooke Hart	7 January 2002 (aged 20)	(United States Soccer Federation) Georgia Southwestern State University
13	FW	Jessica Torres	4 November 2004 (aged 17)	(Puerto Rican Football Federation) Puerto Rico Sol FC
14	FW	Lilyana Hernandez	23 March 2005 (aged 16)	(United States Soccer Federation) AFC Lightning
16	FW	Alondra Nieves	24 March 2003 (aged 18)	(United States Soccer Federation) Georgia Southwestern State University

=== United States ===
Coach: (England) Tracey Kevins

No.	Pos.	Player	Date of birth (age)	Club
1	GK	Mia Justus	3 September 2002 (aged 19)	(United States Soccer Federation) Florida State
12	GK	Neeku Purcell	7 October 2003 (aged 18)	(United States Soccer Federation) OL Reign Academy
2	DF	Laney Rouse	31 August 2002 (aged 19)	(United States Soccer Federation) University of Virginia
3	DF	Ayo Oke	5 April 2003 (aged 18)	(United States Soccer Federation) University of California
4	DF	Emily Mason	23 October 2002 (aged 19)	(United States Soccer Federation) Rutgers University
5	DF	Lilly Reale	12 August 2003 (aged 18)	(United States Soccer Federation) University of California, Los Angeles
13	DF	Samar Guidry	18 January 2002 (aged 20)	(United States Soccer Federation) University of Virginia
14	DF	Lauren Flynn	22 May 2002 (aged 19)	(United States Soccer Federation) Florida State
15	DF	Aidan McConnell	1 February 2003 (aged 19)	(United States Soccer Federation) University of Wisconsin
16	DF	Avery Patterson	14 June 2002 (aged 19)	(United States Soccer Federation) University of North Carolina
6	MF	Emily Colton	23 June 2003 (aged 18)	(United States Soccer Federation) University of North Carolina
8	MF	Olivia Moultrie	17 September 2005 (aged 16)	(United States Soccer Federation) Portland Thorns FC
10	MF	Alexis Missimo	30 January 2003 (aged 19)	(United States Soccer Federation) University of Texas
17	MF	Sally Menti	10 March 2002 (aged 19)	(United States Soccer Federation) Santa Clara University
20	MF	Talia DellaPeruta	19 April 2002 (aged 19)	(United States Soccer Federation) University of North Carolina
7	FW	Simone Jackson	28 January 2003 (aged 19)	(United States Soccer Federation) University of South Carolina
9	FW	Michelle Cooper (c)	4 December 2002 (aged 19)	(United States Soccer Federation) Duke University
11	FW	Alyssa Thompson	7 November 2004 (aged 17)	(United States Soccer Federation) Total Futbol Academy
18	FW	Trinity Byars	29 January 2003 (aged 19)	(United States Soccer Federation) University of Texas
19	FW	Andrea Kitahata	1 January 2003 (aged 19)	(United States Soccer Federation) Stanford University

== Group F ==
=== Guyana ===
Coach: Paul DeAbreu

No.	Pos.	Player	Date of birth (age)	Club
1	GK	Arden La-Rose	28 August 2003 (aged 18)	(Canadian Soccer Association) North Toronto Nitros
18	GK	Aneesa O'Brien	27 April 2002 (aged 19)	(Canadian Soccer Association) FC Durham
2	DF	Jessica Myers	4 September 2002 (aged 19)	(Canadian Soccer Association) FC Durham
3	DF	Hasha Holder	12 November 2003 (aged 18)	(Guyana Football Federation) Fruta Conquerors FC
4	DF	Savannah Mordesir-Singh	6 January 2003 (aged 19)	(Canadian Soccer Association) Burlington Bayhawks
10	DF	Kiana Khedoo	16 December 2002 (aged 19)	(Canadian Soccer Association) Pickering FC
12	DF	Allianna Holder	7 November 2004 (aged 17)	(Guyana Football Federation) Fruta Conquerors FC
14	DF	Rory Scott	26 February 2003 (aged 18)	(Canadian Soccer Association) North Mississauga SC
17	DF	Gabriella Salvadore	11 May 2002 (aged 19)	(Canadian Soccer Association) ProStars FC
7	MF	Samantha Banfield	17 February 2004 (aged 18)	(Canadian Soccer Association) Woodbridge Strikers B
8	MF	Jenea Knight	25 May 2003 (aged 18)	(Canadian Soccer Association) Ottawa South United
13	MF	Jessica Jagdeo	10 July 2002 (aged 19)	(Canadian Soccer Association) Durham College
15	MF	Dylana Makarowski	26 May 2002 (aged 19)	(Canadian Soccer Association) York University
19	MF	Latesha Sutherland	31 May 2003 (aged 18)	(Guyana Football Federation) Fruta Conquerors FC
20	MF	Valentina Khan	28 July 2002 (aged 19)	(Canadian Soccer Association) Unionville Milliken SC
5	FW	Shamya Daniels	8 August 2004 (aged 17)	(Guyana Football Federation) Fruta Conquerors FC
6	FW	Audrey Narine	24 May 2002 (aged 19)	(Canadian Soccer Association) North Mississauga SC
9	FW	Shanic Thornhill	26 November 2003 (aged 18)	(Guyana Football Federation) Fruta Conquerors FC
11	FW	Alleia Alleyne	28 June 2003 (aged 18)	(Trinidad and Tobago Football Association) Police FC
16	FW	Inari Moore	31 January 2003 (aged 19)	(Canadian Soccer Association) Dalhousie University

=== Honduras ===
Coach: (Mexico) Juan Carlos Tenorio

No.	Pos.	Player	Date of birth (age)	Club
1	GK	Ashley Fonseca	3 October 2005 (aged 16)	Unattached
12	GK	Dina Gaitan	23 February 2002 (aged 20)	(National Autonomous Federation of Football of Honduras) Olancho F.C.
2	DF	Cesia Navarro	17 April 2004 (aged 17)	(National Autonomous Federation of Football of Honduras) C.D. Olimpia
3	DF	Yeymi Lanza	23 January 2003 (aged 19)	(National Autonomous Federation of Football of Honduras) C.D. Real Juventud
4	DF	Génesis Ortiz	11 June 2002 (aged 19)	(National Autonomous Federation of Football of Honduras) C.D. Real Juventud
5	DF	Nicolle García	16 July 2002 (aged 19)	(National Autonomous Federation of Football of Honduras) F.C. Motagua
14	DF	Daniela Zuñiga	10 August 2006 (aged 15)	(National Autonomous Federation of Football of Honduras) Platense F.C. Jr.
16	DF	Emelly Chicas	10 November 2004 (aged 17)	(National Autonomous Federation of Football of Honduras) Eurosport
19	DF	Anyeli Rodriguez	2 March 2006 (aged 15)	(National Autonomous Federation of Football of Honduras) F.C. Motagua
6	MF	Gabriela Varela	1 October 2004 (aged 17)	(United States Soccer Federation) Warren High School
7	MF	Karla Calix	27 November 2005 (aged 16)	(National Autonomous Federation of Football of Honduras) Puma
8	MF	Angie Gómez	28 May 2003 (aged 18)	(National Autonomous Federation of Football of Honduras) Lobos UPNFM
10	MF	Alessandra Canahuati	16 February 2006 (aged 16)	(National Autonomous Federation of Football of Honduras) C.D. Marathón
13	MF	Sofía Morales	4 July 2003 (aged 18)	(United States Soccer Federation) Clarke University
17	MF	Karol García (c)	27 January 2004 (aged 18)	(National Autonomous Federation of Football of Honduras) Lobos UPNFM
9	FW	Allison Pastrana	19 April 2004 (aged 17)	(National Autonomous Federation of Football of Honduras) Puma
11	FW	Elizabeth Álvarez	8 October 2004 (aged 17)	(National Autonomous Federation of Football of Honduras) F.C. Motagua
15	FW	Larissa Arias	7 October 2005 (aged 16)	(National Autonomous Federation of Football of Honduras) Universidad Femenino
20	FW	Amy Flores	16 May 2004 (aged 17)	(National Autonomous Federation of Football of Honduras) Club Deportivo Tigres

=== Mexico ===
Coach: (Mexico) Maribel Domínguez

No.	Pos.	Player	Date of birth (age)	Club
1	GK	Celeste Espino	8 September 2003 (aged 18)	(Mexican Football Federation) Guadalajara
12	GK	Paola Manrique	28 April 2002 (aged 19)	(Mexican Football Federation) Pachuca
2	DF	Daniela Monroy	21 September 2002 (aged 19)	(Mexican Football Federation) Cruz Azul
3	DF	Carol Cázares	16 May 2003 (aged 18)	(Mexican Football Federation) UANL
4	DF	Jana Gutiérrez	25 October 2003 (aged 18)	(Mexican Football Federation) UANL
5	DF	Alexxandra Ramírez	23 May 2002 (aged 19)	(Mexican Football Federation) Santos Laguna
13	DF	Samantha López	16 April 2003 (aged 18)	(United States Soccer Federation) California Baptist Lancers
14	DF	Emili Bautista	9 April 2003 (aged 18)	(Mexican Football Federation) Juárez
15	DF	Kinberly Guzmán	19 September 2002 (aged 19)	(Mexican Football Federation) Guadalajara
6	MF	Daniela Delgado	27 September 2002 (aged 19)	(Mexican Football Federation) Santos Laguna
8	MF	Silvana Flores	18 April 2002 (aged 19)	(The Football Association) Tottenham Hotspur
10	MF	Anette Vázquez (c)	11 March 2002 (aged 19)	(Mexican Football Federation) Guadalajara
11	MF	Natalia Mauleón	4 February 2002 (aged 20)	(Mexican Football Federation) América
16	MF	Paola Chavero	16 May 2002 (aged 19)	(Mexican Football Federation) UNAM
17	MF	Maritza Maldonado	26 May 2002 (aged 19)	(Mexican Football Federation) Querétaro
18	MF	Isabella Gutiérrez	9 March 2004 (aged 17)	(Mexican Football Federation) Guadalajara
20	MF	Ammanda Marroquín	3 April 2003 (aged 18)	(United States Soccer Federation) Washington State Cougars
7	FW	Aylín Avilez	18 May 2003 (aged 18)	(Mexican Football Federation) Monterrey
9	FW	Alexia Villanueva	22 February 2003 (aged 19)	(Mexican Football Federation) Santos Laguna
19	FW	Tatiana Flores	15 September 2005 (aged 16)	(The Football Association) Chelsea

=== Panama ===
Coach: (Panama) Raiza Gutiérrez

No.	Pos.	Player	Date of birth (age)	Club
1	GK	Alejandra Garay	6 June 2004 (aged 17)	(Panamanian Football Federation) C.D. Plaza Amador
12	GK	Isabella Morey	17 December 2003 (aged 18)	(United States Soccer Federation) Concord Fire
3	DF	Ana Rodríguez	23 April 2002 (aged 19)	(Panamanian Football Federation) S.D. Atlético Nacional
4	DF	Hilary Jaén	29 August 2002 (aged 19)	(Panamanian Football Federation) Tauro F.C.
5	DF	Wendy Natis	19 August 2002 (aged 19)	Unattached
2	MF	Rosario Vargas	9 August 2002 (aged 19)	(Royal Spanish Football Federation) Valencia CF
6	MF	Aldrith Quintero (c)	1 January 2002 (aged 20)	(Royal Spanish Football Federation) Real Unión de Tenerife
7	MF	Gloria Sáenz	2 July 2002 (aged 19)	(Panamanian Football Federation) S.D. Atlético Nacional
8	MF	Desyré Salazar	4 May 2004 (aged 17)	(Panamanian Football Federation) Tauro F.C.
10	MF	Yasli Atencio	25 September 2002 (aged 19)	(Panamanian Football Federation) Tauro F.C.
11	MF	Emily Cedeño	22 November 2003 (aged 18)	(Panamanian Football Federation) C.D. Plaza Amador
13	MF	Elka Mojica	16 May 2003 (aged 18)	(Panamanian Football Federation) Atlético Chiriquí
17	MF	Erika Arauz	20 July 2003 (aged 18)	(Panamanian Football Federation) Tauro F.C.
19	MF	Mickeylis Gutiérrez	3 September 2002 (aged 19)	(Panamanian Football Federation) Tauro F.C.
20	MF	Diana Pon	15 August 2004 (aged 17)	(United States Soccer Federation) Prime FC
9	FW	Ana Quintero	14 August 2004 (aged 17)	(Panamanian Football Federation) C.D. Plaza Amador
14	FW	Yamileth Palacio	22 August 2003 (aged 18)	(Panamanian Football Federation) C.D. Plaza Amador
15	FW	Aaliyah Gil	18 July 2004 (aged 17)	(Panamanian Football Federation) Tauro F.C.
16	FW	Elibeth Vásquez	22 January 2002 (aged 20)	(Panamanian Football Federation) S.D. Atlético Nacional
18	FW	Shayari Camarena	13 October 2003 (aged 18)	(Panamanian Football Federation) Tauro F.C.

== Group G ==
=== Canada ===
Coach: (Canada) Cindy Tye

No.	Pos.	Player	Date of birth (age)	Club
1	GK	Anna Karpenko	10 April 2002 (aged 19)	(United States Soccer Federation) Harvard University
20	GK	Sierra Giorgio	9 October 2003 (aged 18)	(United States Soccer Federation) Syracuse University
2	DF	Zoe Burns	5 January 2002 (aged 20)	(United States Soccer Federation) University of Southern California
3	DF	Mia Pante	25 March 2003 (aged 18)	(United States Soccer Federation) Texas A&M University
4	DF	Jade Rose	12 February 2003 (aged 19)	(United States Soccer Federation) Harvard University
5	DF	Annika Leslie	22 April 2003 (aged 18)	(United States Soccer Federation) West Virginia University
12	DF	Vivianne Bessette	23 June 2002 (aged 19)	(United States Soccer Federation) University of South Florida
14	DF	Brooklyn Courtnall	28 December 2002 (aged 19)	(United States Soccer Federation) University of Southern California
15	DF	Lou Tsé	7 December 2002 (aged 19)	(United States Soccer Federation) Southern Methodist University
6	MF	Vanessa Frelih	23 May 2004 (aged 17)	(Canadian Soccer Association) Ontario REX
7	MF	Florianne Jourde	5 November 2004 (aged 17)	(Canadian Soccer Association) Quebec REX
8	MF	Sonia Walk	12 August 2002 (aged 19)	(United States Soccer Federation) Boston College
10	MF	Nikayla Small	24 March 2003 (aged 18)	(United States Soccer Federation) Wake Forest University
13	MF	Simi Awujo	23 September 2003 (aged 18)	(United States Soccer Federation) University of Southern California
16	MF	Keera Melenhorst	2 May 2003 (aged 18)	(United States Soccer Federation) University of Oklahoma
9	FW	Miya Grant-Claviji	17 June 2003 (aged 18)	(United States Soccer Federation) Brown University
11	FW	Kaila Novak	24 March 2002 (aged 19)	(United States Soccer Federation) University of California, Los Angeles
17	FW	Holly Ward	25 October 2003 (aged 18)	(United States Soccer Federation) University of Texas
18	FW	Olivia Smith	5 August 2004 (aged 17)	(United States Soccer Federation) Florida State University
19	FW	Serita Thurton	16 January 2002 (aged 20)	(United States Soccer Federation) University of South Florida

=== El Salvador ===
Coach: (El Salvador) Eric Acuña

No.	Pos.	Player	Date of birth (age)	Club
1	GK	Andrea Dada	14 September 2004 (aged 17)	(Salvadoran Football Federation) Escuela Americana
18	GK	Alexandra Jiménez	4 May 2004 (aged 17)	(Salvadoran Football Federation) Santa Tecla F.C.
2	DF	Andrea Amaya	16 February 2003 (aged 19)	
3	DF	Linda Guillen	28 June 2004 (aged 17)	(Salvadoran Football Federation) Alianza Women
4	DF	Mónica Mancia	28 February 2003 (aged 18)	(Salvadoran Football Federation) Imder
5	DF	Andrea Recinos	30 September 2005 (aged 16)	(Salvadoran Football Federation) College Cup
15	DF	Evelyn Gamero	22 June 2003 (aged 18)	(Salvadoran Football Federation) C.D. Chalatenango
16	DF	Emely Reyes	23 July 2004 (aged 17)	(United States Soccer Federation) Challenge Soccer Club
17	DF	Gloria Escobar	30 September 2003 (aged 18)	(Salvadoran Football Federation) Once Deportivo FC
19	DF	Daniela Durán	30 September 2003 (aged 18)	Unattached
6	MF	Isabella Recinos	27 January 2003 (aged 19)	Unattached
7	MF	Carolina Ayala	6 April 2005 (aged 16)	(Salvadoran Football Federation) C.D. Luis Ángel Firpo
8	MF	Victoria Sánchez (c)	22 January 2005 (aged 17)	(Salvadoran Football Federation) Instituto Emiliani
9	MF	Lesly Calderón	19 March 2002 (aged 19)	(Salvadoran Football Federation) C.D. FAS
13	MF	Beatríz Quezada	22 November 2002 (aged 19)	(Salvadoran Football Federation) College Cup
14	MF	Amy Ángel	23 December 2006 (aged 15)	(United States Soccer Federation) Northern Virginia Royals FC
10	FW	Mía Arevalo	9 June 2005 (aged 16)	(United States Soccer Federation) Virginia Development Academy
11	FW	Josseline Uribe	19 March 2003 (aged 18)	(Salvadoran Football Federation) Gardenias de Coatepeque CF
12	FW	Andrea Maestre	23 October 2004 (aged 17)	(Salvadoran Football Federation) Escuela Americana
20	FW	Mallely Gómez	23 October 2002 (aged 19)	(Salvadoran Football Federation) C.D. Chalatenango

=== Saint Kitts and Nevis ===
Coach: (Saint Kitts and Nevis) Earl Jones

No.	Pos.	Player	Date of birth (age)	Club
1	GK	Solleessh Rawlins	14 October 2003 (aged 18)	(St. Kitts and Nevis Football Association) Sandy Point High School
18	GK	Tatyanna Daley	20 April 2006 (aged 15)	Unattached
13	DF	Jewvonna Morson	21 December 2004 (aged 17)	(St. Kitts and Nevis Football Association) Sandy Point High School
2	MF	Shenica Francis	4 March 2005 (aged 16)	(St. Kitts and Nevis Football Association) St. Pauls FC
3	MF	Glenecia Battice	22 May 2003 (aged 18)	(St. Kitts and Nevis Football Association) Newtown United FC
4	MF	Hadassah St. Juste	26 June 2002 (aged 19)	(The Football Association) Heath Ballerz FC
5	MF	Cloey Uddenberg (c)	13 November 2002 (aged 19)	(Canadian Soccer Association) Guelph Union
6	MF	Kayla Uddenberg	24 October 2005 (aged 16)	(Canadian Soccer Association) Aurora FC
8	MF	Kayzg Boyles	23 November 2006 (aged 15)	(St. Kitts and Nevis Football Association) Newtown United FC
11	MF	Eve Richards	17 April 2003 (aged 18)	(The Football Association) Heath Ballerz FC
15	MF	Sequia Williams	22 August 2004 (aged 17)	
17	MF	Christi-Anne Mills	27 July 2002 (aged 19)	(St. Kitts and Nevis Football Association) Newtown United FC
19	MF	Zonia Marshall	6 May 2003 (aged 18)	(St. Kitts and Nevis Football Association) Newtown United FC
20	MF	Trishanue Warner	4 February 2004 (aged 18)	(St. Kitts and Nevis Football Association) Sandy Point High School
7	FW	Jaysonna Williams	28 March 2003 (aged 18)	(St. Kitts and Nevis Football Association) Nagico Canyon FC
9	FW	Ellie Stokes	21 November 2003 (aged 18)	(United States Soccer Federation) St. Mary's Power
10	FW	Jahzara Claxton	12 March 2006 (aged 15)	(St. Kitts and Nevis Football Association) Newtown United FC
14	FW	Iyanla Bailey-Williams	10 August 2002 (aged 19)	(Puerto Rican Football Federation) Bayamon FC

=== Trinidad and Tobago ===
Coach: (Trinidad and Tobago) Jason Spence

No.	Pos.	Player	Date of birth (age)	Club
1	GK	Akyla Walcott	11 December 2002 (aged 19)	(Trinidad and Tobago Football Association) Pleasantville Secondary
16	GK	Chelsea Ramnauth	21 June 2002 (aged 19)	(Trinidad and Tobago Football Association) Fyzabad Secondary
18	GK	Aaliyah Alexander	17 January 2002 (aged 20)	(Trinidad and Tobago Football Association) Signal Hill Secondary
2	DF	Ashante Wilson-Campbell	2 January 2003 (aged 19)	(Trinidad and Tobago Football Association) Jewels FC
4	DF	Latifha Pascall	2 July 2003 (aged 18)	(Trinidad and Tobago Football Association) Pleasantville Secondary
5	DF	Derisha Bristol	2 February 2003 (aged 19)	(Trinidad and Tobago Football Association) Signal Hill Secondary
13	DF	Aaliyah Trim	27 March 2004 (aged 17)	Unattached
3	MF	Moenesa Mejias	4 December 2003 (aged 18)	(Trinidad and Tobago Football Association) Trincity Nationals
6	MF	Chrissy Mitchell	17 January 2002 (aged 20)	(Trinidad and Tobago Football Association) Mayaro Secondary
7	MF	Sarah De Gannes	22 September 2002 (aged 19)	(United States Soccer Federation) Brewton-Parker College
8	MF	Marley Walker	19 October 2005 (aged 16)	(United States Soccer Federation) Charleston Soccer Club
10	MF	Maria-Frances Serrant (c)	14 November 2002 (aged 19)	(United States Soccer Federation) Corban University
11	MF	Charlize Hood	10 May 2003 (aged 18)	(Trinidad and Tobago Football Association) Police FC
14	MF	Lillian Selvon	12 April 2003 (aged 18)	(Trinidad and Tobago Football Association) Trincity Nationals
15	MF	Temia St. Clair	24 August 2002 (aged 19)	(Trinidad and Tobago Football Association) UTT FC
17	MF	Jhelysse Anthony	2 June 2005 (aged 16)	(The Football Association) International Soccer Academy
9	FW	Tori Paul	22 August 2002 (aged 19)	(United States Soccer Federation) Charlotte Independence
12	FW	Celina Loraine	18 May 2002 (aged 19)	(Trinidad and Tobago Football Association) Signal Hill Secondary
19	FW	Shurella Mendez	5 November 2003 (aged 18)	(Trinidad and Tobago Football Association) Curtis Orr Football Academy
20	FW	Darrianne Henry	25 April 2003 (aged 18)	(Trinidad and Tobago Football Association) Jeweld FC

== Group H ==
=== Cuba ===
Coach: (Cuba) Midel Logal Domínguez

No.	Pos.	Player	Date of birth (age)	Club
1	GK	Erika Acea (c)	4 June 2003 (aged 18)	(Football Association of Cuba) FC Cienfuegos
13	GK	Shaila Hernández	16 July 2005 (aged 16)	(Football Association of Cuba) FC Artemisa
20	GK	Yunarys Ramirez	20 July 2003 (aged 18)	(Football Association of Cuba) FC Villa Clara
2	DF	Yarelmis Días	25 December 2005 (aged 16)	(Football Association of Cuba) FC Villa Clara
3	DF	Yerly Palma	14 March 2002 (aged 19)	(Football Association of Cuba) FC Camagüey
4	DF	Lianet Franco	14 January 2005 (aged 17)	(Football Association of Cuba) FC Santiago de Cuba
5	DF	Liz Marian	23 April 2005 (aged 16)	(Football Association of Cuba) FC Granma
12	DF	Sheyla Vega	5 January 2005 (aged 17)	(Football Association of Cuba) FC Granma
15	DF	Dayamis Chinea	15 September 2002 (aged 19)	(Football Association of Cuba) FC Villa Clara
16	DF	Yelenis Sarria	6 August 2003 (aged 18)	(Football Association of Cuba) FC Habana
6	MF	Elizabeth Zara	26 May 2002 (aged 19)	(Football Association of Cuba) FC Holguín
8	MF	Yesela Castillo	27 December 2005 (aged 16)	(Football Association of Cuba) FC Camagüey
14	MF	Daniela Villavicencio	4 April 2004 (aged 17)	(Football Association of Cuba) FC Granma
17	MF	Ninel Ortega	3 May 2006 (aged 15)	(Football Association of Cuba) FC Habana
7	FW	Dalia Ledesma	5 July 2006 (aged 15)	(Football Association of Cuba) FC Artemisa
9	FW	Katheryn Rodríguez	10 September 2002 (aged 19)	(Football Association of Cuba) FC Villa Clara
10	FW	María Karla	26 December 2004 (aged 17)	(Football Association of Cuba) FC Santiago de Cuba
11	FW	Sabrina Bahamonde	30 December 2004 (aged 17)	(Football Association of Cuba) Pinar del Río FC
18	FW	Ainachy Montalvo	17 October 2005 (aged 16)	(Football Association of Cuba) FC Camagüey
19	FW	Indira Hechavarria	19 December 2003 (aged 18)	(Football Association of Cuba) FC Santiago de Cuba

=== Guatemala ===
Coach: (Guatemala) Edy Espinoza

No.	Pos.	Player	Date of birth (age)	Club
1	GK	Fabiola Montenegro	30 June 2003 (aged 18)	(National Football Federation of Guatemala) Unifut-Rosal
12	GK	Jecca Stuhlhofer	9 February 2006 (aged 16)	(National Football Federation of Guatemala) Unifut-Rosal
2	DF	Jemery Myvett	2 March 2004 (aged 17)	(National Football Federation of Guatemala) Unifut-Rosal
3	DF	Naylea Priego	9 May 2003 (aged 18)	(National Football Federation of Guatemala) Unifut-Rosal
4	DF	Jezmin Castellanos	7 November 2002 (aged 19)	(National Football Federation of Guatemala) Unifut-Rosal
13	DF	Daniela Mazariegos	31 January 2002 (aged 20)	(National Football Federation of Guatemala) Club Xelaju M.C
16	DF	Sofía Morales	26 April 2005 (aged 16)	(National Football Federation of Guatemala) Unifut-Rosal
20	DF	Ariadna Olayo	26 March 2004 (aged 17)	(National Football Federation of Guatemala) Ciudad Vieja FC
6	MF	María Contreras	18 December 2002 (aged 19)	(United States Soccer Federation) Nova Southeastern Sharks
7	MF	Lesly Ventura	22 May 2003 (aged 18)	(National Football Federation of Guatemala) Cobaneras FC
8	MF	Elisa Texaj (c)	5 February 2003 (aged 19)	(National Football Federation of Guatemala) Unifut-Rosal
10	MF	Dina Polanco	23 January 2006 (aged 16)	(National Football Federation of Guatemala) Unifut-Rosal
11	MF	María Tarrago	15 May 2002 (aged 19)	(National Football Federation of Guatemala) Unifut-Rosal
14	MF	Aylin Juárez	18 June 2002 (aged 19)	(National Football Federation of Guatemala) Cobaneras FC
17	MF	Sandra Ovando	20 July 2003 (aged 18)	(National Football Federation of Guatemala) Club Xelaju M.C
19	MF	Keila Tiriquiz	2 May 2004 (aged 17)	(National Football Federation of Guatemala) Unifut-Rosal
5	FW	Daniela Xiquin	12 December 2003 (aged 18)	(National Football Federation of Guatemala) Unifut-Rosal
9	FW	Celsa Cruz	12 September 2003 (aged 18)	(National Football Federation of Guatemala) Csd Izabal
15	FW	Briana Valenzuela		
18	FW	Keyla Romero	9 January 2004 (aged 18)	(National Football Federation of Guatemala) Unifut-Rosal

=== Haiti ===
Coach: (Haiti) Fiorda Charles

No.	Pos.	Player	Date of birth (age)	Club
1	GK	Madelina Fleuriot	28 October 2003 (aged 18)	(Haitian Football Federation) Exafoot
12	GK	Nahomie Ambroise	13 November 2003 (aged 18)	(Haitian Football Federation) Anacaona SC
2	DF	Esthericove Joseph (c)	5 February 2003 (aged 19)	(Haitian Football Federation) Exafoot
3	DF	Fabiola St-Fleur	19 January 2005 (aged 17)	(Haitian Football Federation) AS Trigresses
4	DF	Jenny Flore Desmarrates	14 December 2003 (aged 18)	(Haitian Football Federation) Exafoot
5	DF	Méghane Saint-Cyr	26 February 2003 (aged 18)	(Canadian Soccer Association) Les Aigles d'Ahuntsic
6	DF	Christelle Calixte		
15	DF	Rose-Bertude Rosinvil	18 April 2005 (aged 16)	(Haitian Football Federation) AS Trigresses
18	DF	Rose Pierreline France	3 October 2003 (aged 18)	(Haitian Football Federation) ASF Croix-des-Bouquets
8	MF	Alcide Whithmila Pierre	13 December 2003 (aged 18)	(Haitian Football Federation) AS Trigresses
10	MF	Dayana Pierre	24 September 2003 (aged 18)	(Haitian Football Federation) ASF Croix-des-Bouquets
13	MF	Maudeline Moryl	24 January 2003 (aged 19)	(Haitian Football Federation) ASF Croix-des-Bouquets
14	MF	Gaëlle Dumas	21 February 2003 (aged 19)	(Haitian Football Federation) ASF Croix-des-Bouquets
17	MF	Ginette Aristil		
19	MF	Mirlene Dorce	13 February 2003 (aged 19)	(Haitian Football Federation) ASF Croix-des-Bouquets
7	FW	Rose-Alya Marcellus	22 March 2003 (aged 18)	(Haitian Football Federation) ASF Croix-des-Bouquets
9	FW	Florsie Joseph	15 December 2003 (aged 18)	(Haitian Football Federation) Don Bosco FC
11	FW	Valentina Ornis	22 August 2003 (aged 18)	(Haitian Football Federation) ASF Croix-des-Bouquets
16	FW	Mariline Guerrier	14 July 2003 (aged 18)	(Haitian Football Federation) Exafoot

=== Jamaica ===
Coach: (Jamaica) Xavier Gilbert

No.	Pos.	Player	Date of birth (age)	Club
1	GK	Liya Brooks	17 May 2005 (aged 16)	(United States Soccer Federation) Hawaii Surf Soccer Club
3	GK	Serena Mensah	14 March 2002 (aged 19)	(United States Soccer Federation) Fordham Rams
13	GK	Javanae Jones	6 October 2002 (aged 19)	(Jamaica Football Federation) Reinas Academy
2	DF	Mia Mitchel	14 March 2005 (aged 16)	(United States Soccer Federation) Charlotte Soccer Academy
4	DF	Able Nevillegail	15 February 2002 (aged 20)	(United States Soccer Federation) Navarro College
5	DF	Anabel Moore	20 March 2003 (aged 18)	(Jamaica Football Federation) Yale University
6	DF	Malia Atkins (c)	3 February 2002 (aged 20)	(United States Soccer Federation) South Dakota Coyotes
11	DF	Davia Richards	10 February 2004 (aged 18)	(Jamaica Football Federation) Waterhouse FC
20	DF	Adrene Smith	26 November 2006 (aged 15)	(Jamaica Football Federation) UWI F.C.
7	MF	Shaneil Buckley	20 May 2005 (aged 16)	(Jamaica Football Federation) Waterhouse FC
9	MF	Kameron Simmonds	6 December 2003 (aged 18)	(Jamaica Football Federation) Richmond FC
10	MF	Peyton McNamara	22 February 2002 (aged 20)	(United States Soccer Federation) Ohio State Buckeyes
12	MF	Chantelle Parker	1 January 2002 (aged 20)	(United States Soccer Federation) Pittsburgh Panthers
14	MF	Shania Harris	19 July 2002 (aged 19)	(United States Soccer Federation) Daytona State College
15	MF	Alexia Wright		
17	MF	Zoe Vidaurre	16 March 2003 (aged 18)	(United States Soccer Federation) Bethesda ECNL
19	MF	Alexia Spencer	28 January 2002 (aged 20)	(United States Soccer Federation) Saint Leo Lions
8	FW	Christina Salmon	13 August 2002 (aged 19)	(United States Soccer Federation) Hill College
16	FW	Daihla Whyte	7 September 2003 (aged 18)	Unattached
18	FW	Theanna Burnett	18 September 2003 (aged 18)	(United States Soccer Federation) Gwinnett Soccer Academy
