= Giovanna Dionicio =

Dominican footballer

Personal information
- Full name: Giovanna Laurel Dionicio Geraldino
- Date of birth: September 20, 2001 (age 25)
- Place of birth: West Hartford, Connecticut, United States
- Height: 5 ft 6 in (1.68 m)
- Position: Defender

Team information
- Current team: Sligo Rovers

Youth career
- FSA FC

College career
Years	Team	Apps	(Gls)
2019–2022	Yale Bulldogs	24	(0)
2023	Connecticut Huskies	16	(0)

Senior career*
Years	Team	Apps	(Gls)
2024	Vermont Green		
2025	River Light		
2026	Sporting CT		
2026–	Sligo Rovers	9	(1)

International career^{‡}
2020	Dominican Republic U20	5	(0)
2021–	Dominican Republic	17	(1)
- * Club domestic league appearances and goals as of 3 October 2026 ‡ National team caps and goals as of 3 October 2026

Giovanna Laurel Dionicio Geraldino (born September 20, 2001) is a footballer who plays for League of Ireland Women's Premier Division club Sligo Rovers. Born in the United States, she plays for the Dominican Republic national team.

== Early life ==
Dionicio played youth soccer with FSA FC. She attended Hall High School, where she was named all-state as a senior and was a three-time all-conference selection.

== College career ==
In 2019, Dionicio began attending Yale University, where she played for the women's soccer team.

In 2023, she transferred to the University of Connecticut as a graduate student, where she played for the women's soccer team. She made her debut on August 20 against the Boston University Terriers.

== Club career ==
In 2021, she played with Connecticut Fusion II in the UWS League Two. In 2024, she played with Sporting CT in United Women's Soccer.

In June 2024, she was named to the original roster for the women's team of Vermont Green FC for the club's first-ever women's game, an exhibition against Canadian Ligue1 Quebec side FC Laval.

In 2025, she joined USL W League club River Light FC.

In August 2026 she joined Irish club Sligo Rovers who play in the top level of women's football in Ireland.

== International career ==
In 2020, she played with the Dominican Republic U20.

In 2021, she was called up to the Dominican Republic senior team for the first time. On 19 February 2022, she scored her first international goal in a 4–0 victory over the Cayman Islands in a 2022 CONCACAF W Championship qualification match.

List of International Goals by Giovanna Dionicio
No.	Date	Opponent	Score	Result	Competition
1.	19 February 2022	Cayman Islands	4–0	4–0	2022 CONCACAF W Championship qualification
