= 2020 in American soccer =

Soccer in the United States
- Season: 2020

Men's soccer
- Supporters' Shield: Philadelphia Union
- USL Championship: Tampa Bay Rowdies (Eastern Conference); Phoenix Rising FC (Western Conference)
- USL League One: Greenville Triumph SC
- NISA: Spring: Canceled; Fall: Detroit City FC
- NPSL: Canceled
- USL League Two: Canceled
- US Open Cup: Canceled
- MLS is Back Tournament: Portland Timbers
- MLS Cup: Columbus Crew SC

Women's soccer
- NWSL: Canceled
- NWSL Fall series: Portland Thorns FC
- WPSL: Canceled
- NWSL Challenge Cup: Houston Dash

The 2020 season was the 108th season of competitive soccer in the United States. Many of the competitions were significantly altered, postponed, or cancelled in the wake of the ongoing COVID-19 pandemic.

== National teams ==
=== Men's ===
==== Senior ====
As of December 9, 2020.

Wins	Losses	Draws
3	0	1

===== Friendlies =====
January 15	United States	Canceled	Kosovo	Doha, Qatar
				Stadium: Aspire Academy
Note: The match was canceled after United States cancelled training camp in Aspire Academy due to the 2019–20 Persian Gulf crisis.

February 1	United States	1–0	Costa Rica	Carson, California
15:55 ET	Llanez 50' (pen.)	Report		Stadium: Dignity Health Sports Park; Attendance: 9,172; Referee: Oshane Nation (Jamaica)

March 26	Netherlands	Cancelled	United States	Eindhoven, Netherlands
15:45 ET		Report		Stadium: Philips Stadion
Note: Cancelled due to the COVID-19 pandemic.

March 30	Wales	Cancelled	United States	Cardiff, Wales
14:30 ET		Report		Stadium: Cardiff City Stadium
Note: Cancelled due to the COVID-19 pandemic.

November 12	Wales	0–0	United States	Swansea, Wales
14:45 ET		Report		Stadium: Liberty Stadium; Attendance: 0 Referee: Nick Walsh (Scotland)

November 16	United States	6–2	Panama	Wiener Neustadt, Austria
14:45 ET	Reyna 18'; Gioacchini 22', 26'; Soto 83', 90+1'; Lletget 87'	Report	Fajardo 8', 79'	Stadium: Wiener Neustadt Arena; Attendance: 0 Referee: Harald Lechner (Austria)

December 9	United States	6–0	El Salvador	Fort Lauderdale, Florida
19:30 ET	Arriola 17'; Mueller 20', 25'; Lletget 23'; Akinola 27'; Aaronson 50'	Report		Stadium: Inter Miami CF Stadium; Attendance: 2,500; Referee: Jose Raul Torres Rivera (Puerto Rico)

===== Goalscorers =====
Goals are current as of December 9, 2020, after the match against El Salvador.

Player	Goals
Nicholas Gioacchini	2
Sebastian Soto	2
Sebastian Lletget	2
Chris Mueller	2
Giovanni Reyna	1
Ulysses Llanez	1
Paul Arriola	1
Ayo Akinola	1
Brenden Aaronson	1

==== U–23 ====
===== CONCACAF Men's Olympic Qualifying Championship =====
The tournament was moved to March 2021.

==== U–20 ====
===== CONCACAF U-20 Championship =====
The tournament was originally scheduled to be held in Honduras between 20 June and 5 July 2020. However, on 13 May 2020, CONCACAF announced the decision to postpone the tournament due to the COVID-19 pandemic, with the new dates of the tournament to be confirmed later.

====== Group E ======
Pos	Team	Pld	W	D	L	GF	GA	GD	Pts	Qualification
1	United States	0	0	0	0	0	0	0	0	Knockout stage
2	Costa Rica	0	0	0	0	0	0	0	0	Knockout stage
3	Jamaica	0	0	0	0	0	0	0	0	Knockout stage
4	Saint Kitts and Nevis	0	0	0	0	0	0	0	0	

First match(es) will be played: TBD. Source: CONCACAF
Rules for classification: Group stage tiebreakers

TBD	United States	v	Saint Kitts and Nevis	San Pedro Sula, Honduras
				Stadium: Estadio General Francisco Morazán

TBD	United States	v	Jamaica	San Pedro Sula, Honduras
				Stadium: Estadio General Francisco Morazán

TBD	Costa Rica	v	United States	San Pedro Sula, Honduras
				Stadium: Estadio General Francisco Morazán

=== Women's ===
==== Senior ====
As of March 11, 2020.

Wins	Losses	Draws
9	0	0

===== Friendlies =====
April 10	United States	Cancelled	Australia	Sandy, Utah
21:30 ET		Report		Stadium: Rio Tinto Stadium

April 14	United States	Cancelled	Brazil	San Jose, California
22:00 ET		Report		Stadium: Earthquakes Stadium

November 27	Netherlands	0–2	United States	Breda, Netherlands
12:35 ET		Report	Lavelle 41'; K. Mewis 70'	Stadium: Rat Verlegh Stadion; Attendance: 0 Referee: Julia Demetrescu (Romania)

===== CONCACAF Women's Olympic Qualifying Championship =====
The draw for the tournament was on 7 November 2019, 14:30 EST (UTC−5), at the Mediapro Studio in Miami, Florida, United States.

====== Group A ======
Pos	Team	Pld	W	D	L	GF	GA	GD	Pts	Qualification
1	United States (H)	3	3	0	0	18	0	+18	9	Advance to knockout stage
2	Costa Rica	3	2	0	1	8	7	+1	6	Advance to knockout stage
3	Haiti	3	1	0	2	6	6	0	3	
4	Panama	3	0	0	3	1	20	−19	0	

Source: CONCACAF
(H) Hosts
28 January 2020
17:00

Costa Rica	6–1	Panama
Herrera 9', 72'; R. Rodríguez 16' (pen.); S. Cruz 67'; Chinchilla 70'; Elizondo 83'	Report	Castillo 45'

BBVA Stadium, Houston, Texas
Referee: Lucila Venegas (Mexico)
28 January 2020
19:30

United States	4–0	Haiti
Press 2'; Williams 67'; Horan 73'; Lloyd 90+3'	Report

BBVA Stadium, Houston, Texas
Attendance: 4,363
Referee: Odette Hamilton (Jamaica)

31 January 2020
17:00

Haiti	0–2	Costa Rica
	Report	R. Rodríguez 57', 66'

BBVA Stadium, Houston, Texas
Referee: Francia González (Mexico)
31 January 2020
19:30

Panama	0–8	United States
	Report	Horan 3', 18', 81'; Williams 16'; Lavelle 21'; Press 70'; McDonald 72'; Heath 79'

BBVA Stadium, Houston, Texas
Attendance: 14,121
Referee: Myriam Marcotte (Canada)

3 February 2020
17:00

Panama	0–6	Haiti
	Report	Mondésir 5' (pen.), 84'; Saint-Félix 12', 29'; Dumornay 47'; B. Louis 59'

BBVA Stadium, Houston, Texas
Referee: Myriam Marcotte (Canada)
3 February 2020
19:30

United States	6–0	Costa Rica
Press 4', 36'; Horan 10'; Mewis 63', 83'; McDonald 77'	Report

BBVA Stadium, Houston, Texas
Attendance: 7,082
Referee: Francia González (Mexico)

=== Group B ===
Pos	Team	Pld	W	D	L	GF	GA	GD	Pts	Qualification
1	Canada	3	3	0	0	22	0	+22	9	Advance to knockout stage
2	Mexico	3	2	0	1	7	2	+5	6	Advance to knockout stage
3	Jamaica	3	1	0	2	7	10	−3	3	
4	Saint Kitts and Nevis	3	0	0	3	0	24	−24	0	

Source: CONCACAF
29 January 2020
16:30

Canada	11–0	Saint Kitts and Nevis
Sinclair 7' (pen.), 23'; Leon 12', 26', 43', 80'; Lawrence 18', 57'; Riviere 40'; Fleming 54'; Huitema 74'	Report

H-E-B Park, Edinburg, Texas
Attendance: 820
Referee: Crystal Sobers (Trinidad and Tobago)
29 January 2020
19:00

Mexico	1–0	Jamaica
Cuéllar 36'	Report

H-E-B Park, Edinburg, Texas
Referee: Katja Koroleva (United States)

1 February 2020
14:30

Saint Kitts and Nevis	0–6	Mexico
	Report	Palacios 3'; López 4'; Mayor 9' (pen.); Cuéllar 22', 52'; Mercado 76'

H-E-B Park, Edinburg, Texas
Referee: Tatiana Guzmán (Nicaragua)
1 February 2020
16:30

Jamaica	0–9	Canada
	Report	Huitema 10', 55', 62', 81', 90+3'; Rose 16'; Beckie 44', 51', 66'

H-E-B Park, Edinburg, Texas
Attendance: 2,010
Referee: Melissa Borjas (Honduras)

4 February 2020
17:30

Canada	2–0	Mexico
Sinclair 26'; Zadorsky 45+2'	Report

H-E-B Park, Edinburg, Texas
Referee: Katja Koroleva (United States)
4 February 2020
19:30

Jamaica	7–0	Saint Kitts and Nevis
Shaw 38', 57'; Cameron 40'; Solaun 51'; Carter 68' (pen.); McCoy 70', 85'	Report

H-E-B Park, Edinburg, Texas
Referee: Crystal Sobers (Trinidad and Tobago)

== Knockout stage ==
All times are local, PST (UTC−8).

=== Bracket ===
Semi-finals
7 February – Carson, CA
Canada	1
Costa Rica	0
7 February – Carson, CA
United States	4
Mexico	0

Final
9 February – Carson, CA
Canada	0
United States	3

=== Semi-finals ===
The semi-final winners qualified for the 2020 Summer Olympics.

7 February 2020
16:00

Canada	1–0	Costa Rica
Huitema 72'	Report

Dignity Health Sports Park, Carson, California
Referee: Lucila Venegas (Mexico)

7 February 2020
19:00

United States	4–0	Mexico
Lavelle 5'; Mewis 14', 67'; Press 74'	Report

Dignity Health Sports Park, Carson, California
Attendance: 11,292
Referee: Melissa Borjas (Honduras)

=== Final ===
9 February 2020
15:00

Canada	0–3	United States
	Report	Williams 61'; Horan 71'; Rapinoe 87'

Dignity Health Sports Park, Carson, California
Attendance: 17,489
Referee: Tatiana Guzmán (Nicaragua)

== Goalscorers ==
There were 77 goals scored in 15 matches, for an average of 5.13 goals per match.

7 goals

- (Canada) Jordyn Huitema

6 goals

- (United States) Lindsey Horan

5 goals

- (United States) Christen Press

4 goals

- (Canada) Adriana Leon
- (United States) Sam Mewis

3 goals

- (Canada) Janine Beckie
- (Canada) Christine Sinclair
- (Costa Rica) Raquel Rodríguez
- (Mexico) Renae Cuéllar
- (United States) Lynn Williams

2 goals

- (Canada) Ashley Lawrence
- (Costa Rica) Melissa Herrera
- (Haiti) Nérilia Mondésir
- (Haiti) Mikerline Saint-Félix
- (Jamaica) Kayla McCoy
- (Jamaica) Khadija Shaw
- (United States) Rose Lavelle
- (United States) Jessica McDonald

1 goal

- (Canada) Jessie Fleming
- (Canada) Jayde Riviere
- (Canada) Deanne Rose
- (Canada) Shelina Zadorsky
- (Costa Rica) Priscila Chinchilla
- (Costa Rica) Shirley Cruz
- (Costa Rica) Jazmín Elizondo
- (Haiti) Melchie Dumornay
- (Haiti) Batcheba Louis
- (Jamaica) Tiffany Cameron
- (Jamaica) Trudi Carter
- (Jamaica) Havana Solaun
- (Mexico) Jimena López
- (Mexico) Stephany Mayor
- (Mexico) Liliana Mercado
- (Mexico) Kiana Palacios
- (Panama) Katherine Castillo
- (United States) Tobin Heath
- (United States) Carli Lloyd
- (United States) Megan Rapinoe

== Awards ==
The following awards were given at the conclusion of the tournament.

Award	Winner
Golden Ball	(United States) Christen Press
Golden Boot	(Canada) Jordyn Huitema
Golden Glove	(Canada) Stephanie Labbé
Fair Play Award	United States

CONCACAF also released a "Best XI" of the tournament.

Goalkeeper	Defenders	Midfielders	Forwards
(Canada) Stephanie Labbé	(Canada) Kadeisha Buchanan (Canada) Ashley Lawrence (Costa Rica) Stephannie Blanco (United States) Crystal Dunn	(Costa Rica) Raquel Rodríguez (Haiti) Nérilia Mondésir (United States) Lindsey Horan	(Canada) Jordyn Huitema (Mexico) Renae Cuéllar (United States) Christen Press

== Qualified teams for Summer Olympics ==
The following two teams from CONCACAF qualified for the 2020 Summer Olympic women's football tournament.

Team	Qualified on	Previous appearances in Summer Olympics^{1}
Canada	7 February 2020	3 (2008, 2012, 2016)
United States	7 February 2020	6 (**1996**, 2000, **2004**, **2008**, **2012**, 2016)

^{1} Bold indicates champions for that year. Italic indicates hosts for that year.

== Controversy ==
- In the 19th minute of the group stage match between the United States and Haiti, Haiti's Roseline Éloissaint scored a header from a corner kick. However, the assistant referee signalled that Éloissaint was at an offside position, and Éloissaint's goal was subsequently disallowed. According to the Laws of the Game, there was no offside offense since Éloissaint received the ball directly from a corner kick.

January 28	**United States**	**4–0**	**Haiti**	Houston, Texas
20:30 ET	Press 2'; Williams 67'; Horan 73'; Lloyd 90+3'	Report		Stadium: BBVA Stadium; Attendance: 4,363; Referee: Odette Hamilton (Jamaica)

January 31	**Panama**	**0–8**	**United States**	Houston, Texas
20:30 ET		Report	Horan 3', 18', 81'; Williams 16'; Lavelle 21'; Press 70'; McDonald 72'; Heath 79'	Stadium: BBVA Stadium; Attendance: 14,121; Referee: Myriam Marcotte (Canada)

February 3	**United States**	**6–0**	**Costa Rica**	Houston, Texas
20:30 ET	Press 4', 36'; Horan 10'; Mewis 63', 82'; McDonald 77'	Report		Stadium: BBVA Stadium; Attendance: 7,082; Referee: Francia González (Mexico)

====== Knockout stage ======
February 7 Semi-final	**United States**	**4–0**	**Mexico**	Carson, California
22:00 ET	Lavelle 5'; Mewis 14', 67'; Press 74'	Report		Stadium: Dignity Health Sports Park; Attendance: 11,292; Referee: Melissa Borjas (Honduras)

February 9 Final	**Canada**	**0–3**	**United States**	Carson, California
18:00 ET		Report	Williams 60'; Horan 71'; Rapinoe 87'	Stadium: Dignity Health Sports Park; Attendance: 17,489; Referee: Tatiana Guzmán (Nicaragua)

===== SheBelieves Cup =====
Pos	Team	Pld	W	D	L	GF	GA	GD	Pts
**1st place, gold medalist(s)**	United States (H, C)	**3**	**3**	**0**	**0**	**6**	**1**	**+5**	**9**
2nd place, silver medalist(s)	Spain	3	2	0	1	4	2	+2	**6**
3rd place, bronze medalist(s)	England	3	1	0	2	1	3	−2	**3**
4	Japan	3	0	0	3	2	7	−5	**0**

Source: US Soccer
Rules for classification: 1) points; 2) goal difference; 3) goals scored; 4) head-to-head result; 5) fair play ranking
(C) Champions; (H) Hosts

March 5	**United States**	**2–0**	**England**	Orlando, Florida
19:00 ET	Press 53'; Lloyd 56'	Report		Stadium: Exploria Stadium; Attendance: 16,531; Referee: Odette Hamilton (Jamaica)

March 8	**United States**	**1–0**	**Spain**	Harrison, New Jersey
17:00 ET	Ertz 87'	Report		Stadium: Red Bull Arena; Attendance: 26,500; Referee: Katia García (Mexico)

March 11	**United States**	**3–1**	**Japan**	Frisco, Texas
20:00 ET	Rapinoe 7'; Press 26'; Horan 83'	Report	Iwabuchi 58'	Stadium: Toyota Stadium; Attendance: 19,096; Referee: Melissa Borjas (Honduras)

===== Goalscorers =====
Goals are current as of November 27, 2020, after the match against the Netherlands.

Player	Goals
Lindsey Horan	7
Christen Press	7
Sam Mewis	4
Lynn Williams	3
Rose Lavelle	3
Jessica McDonald	2
Carli Lloyd	2
Megan Rapinoe	2
Tobin Heath	1
Julie Ertz	1
Kristie Mewis	1

==== U–20 ====
===== CONCACAF Women's U-20 Championship =====
====== Group C ======
Pos	Team	Pld	W	D	L	GF	GA	GD	Pts	Qualification
1	United States	3	3	0	0	24	0	+24	**9**	Knockout stage
2	Dominican Republic (H)	3	1	1	1	7	4	+3	**4**	Knockout stage
3	Cuba	3	1	1	1	6	10	−4	**4**	Knockout stage
4	Honduras	3	0	0	3	1	24	−23	**0**	

Source: CONCACAF
Rules for classification: Group stage tiebreakers
(H) Hosts

February 22	**United States**	**9–0**	**Cuba**	Santo Domingo, Dominican Republic
15:00 ET	Fishel 9', 13', 42', 45+1'; Pinto 16', 90'; Spaanstra 37'; Duong 67'; Meza 68'	Report		Stadium: Estadio Olímpico Félix Sánchez; Referee: Sandra Benítez (El Salvador)

February 24	**Dominican Republic**	**0–4**	**United States**	Santo Domingo, Dominican Republic
15:00 ET		Report	Fishel 3', 12'; Jarrett 8'; Pinto 65'	Stadium: Estadio Olímpico Félix Sánchez; Referee: Katia García (Mexico)

February 26	**United States**	**11–0**	**Honduras**	Santo Domingo, Dominican Republic
18:00 ET	Rodman 14', 34', 37', 72'; Holmes 17'; Duong 18'; Reyes 21' (o.g.); Yates 30', 52', 70'; Chicas 73' (o.g.)	Report		Stadium: Estadio Olímpico Félix Sánchez; Referee: Odette Hamilton (Jamaica)

====== Knockout stage ======
February 29 Round of 16	**United States**	**6–0**	**Saint Lucia**	Santo Domingo, Dominican Republic
16:00 ET	Fishel 8', 76'; Francis 14' (o.g.); Enge 24'; Pinto 35', 90'	Report		Stadium: Estadio Olímpico Félix Sánchez; Referee: Falone Dieurisma (Haiti)

March 4 QF	**United States**	**4–0**	**Canada**	Santo Domingo, Dominican Republic
15:00 ET	Fishel 35', 67'; Pinto 41'; Wesley 54'	Report		Stadium: Estadio Olímpico Félix Sánchez; Referee: Melissa Borjas (Honduras)

March 6 SF	**United States**	**6–0**	**Dominican Republic**	Santo Domingo, Dominican Republic
15:00 ET	Pinto 2', 4', 21'; Rodman 16', 62'; Fishel 57'	Report		Stadium: Estadio Olímpico Félix Sánchez; Referee: Tatiana Guzmán (Nicaragua)

March 8 F	**United States**	**4–1**	**Mexico**	Santo Domingo, Dominican Republic
14:00 ET	Rodman 12', 88'; Fishel 49', 57'		Flores 5'	Stadium: Estadio Olímpico Félix Sánchez; Referee: Sandra Benítez (El Salvador)

== Club competitions ==
=== Men's ===
==== League competitions ====
===== Major League Soccer =====
====== MLS is Back Tournament ======
Group A

Group A results
Pos	Team	Pld	W	D	L	GF	GA	GD	Pts	Qualification
1	Orlando City SC (H)	3	2	1	0	6	3	+3	**7**	Advanced to knockout stage
2	Philadelphia Union	3	2	1	0	4	2	+2	**7**	Advanced to knockout stage
3	New York City FC	3	1	0	2	2	4	−2	**3**	Advanced to knockout stage
4	Inter Miami CF	3	0	0	3	2	5	−3	**0**	

Source: MLS
(H) Hosts

Group B

Group B results
Pos	Team	Pld	W	D	L	GF	GA	GD	Pts	Qualification
1	San Jose Earthquakes	3	2	1	0	6	3	+3	**7**	Advanced to knockout stage
2	Seattle Sounders FC	3	1	1	1	4	2	+2	**4**	Advanced to knockout stage
3	Vancouver Whitecaps FC	3	1	0	2	5	7	−2	**3**	Advanced to knockout stage
4	Chicago Fire	3	1	0	2	2	5	−3	**3**	

Source: MLS

Group C

Group C results
Pos	Team	Pld	W	D	L	GF	GA	GD	Pts	Qualification
1	Toronto FC	3	1	2	0	6	5	+1	**5**	Advanced to knockout stage
2	New England Revolution	3	1	2	0	2	1	+1	**5**	Advanced to knockout stage
3	Montreal Impact	3	1	0	2	4	5	−1	**3**	Advanced to knockout stage
4	D.C. United	3	0	2	1	3	4	−1	**2**	

Source: MLS

Group D

Group D results
Pos	Team	Pld	W	D	L	GF	GA	GD	Pts	Qualification
1	Sporting Kansas City	3	2	0	1	6	4	+2	**6**	Advanced to knockout stage
2	Minnesota United FC	3	1	2	0	4	3	+1	**5**	Advanced to knockout stage
3	Real Salt Lake	3	1	1	1	2	2	0	**4**	Advanced to knockout stage
4	Colorado Rapids	3	0	1	2	4	7	−3	**1**	

Source: MLS

Group E

Group E results
Pos	Team	Pld	W	D	L	GF	GA	GD	Pts	Qualification
1	Columbus Crew SC	3	3	0	0	7	0	+7	**9**	Advanced to knockout stage
2	FC Cincinnati	3	2	0	1	3	4	−1	**6**	Advanced to knockout stage
3	New York Red Bulls	3	1	0	2	1	4	−3	**3**	
4	Atlanta United	3	0	0	3	0	3	−3	**0**	

Source: MLS

Group F

Group F results
Pos	Team	Pld	W	D	L	GF	GA	GD	Pts	Qualification
1	Portland Timbers	3	2	1	0	6	4	+2	**7**	Advanced to knockout stage
2	Los Angeles FC	3	1	2	0	11	7	+4	**5**	Advanced to knockout stage
3	Houston Dynamo	3	0	2	1	5	6	−1	**2**	
4	LA Galaxy	3	0	1	2	4	9	−5	**1**	

Source: MLS

Ranking of third-placed teams

3rd place ranking
Pos	Grp	Team	Pld	W	D	L	GF	GA	GD	Pts	Qualification
1	D	Real Salt Lake	3	1	1	1	2	2	0	4	Advanced to knockout stage
2	C	Montreal Impact	3	1	0	2	4	5	−1	3	Advanced to knockout stage
3	B	Vancouver Whitecaps FC	3	1	0	2	5	7	−2	3	Advanced to knockout stage
4	A	New York City FC	3	1	0	2	2	4	−2	3	Advanced to knockout stage
5	E	New York Red Bulls	3	1	0	2	1	4	−3	3	
6	F	Houston Dynamo	3	0	2	1	5	6	−1	2	

Source: MLS
Rules for classification: 1) Points; 2) Goal differential; 3) Goals scored; 4) Fewest disciplinary points

Knockout stage

Round of 16
July 25
**Philadelphia Union**	**1**
New England Revolution	0
July 26
**Sporting Kansas City**	**0 (3)**
Vancouver Whitecaps FC	0 (1)
July 26
Toronto FC	1
**New York City FC**	**3**
July 28
**Portland Timbers**	**1 (4)**
FC Cincinnati	1 (2)
July 25
**Orlando City SC**	**1**
Montreal Impact	0
July 27
Seattle Sounders FC	1
**Los Angeles FC**	**4**
July 27
**San Jose Earthquakes**	**5**
Real Salt Lake	2
July 28
Columbus Crew SC	1 (3)
**Minnesota United FC**	**1 (5)**

Quarter-finals
July 30
**Philadelphia Union**	**3**
Sporting Kansas City	1
August 1
New York City FC	1
**Portland Timbers**	**3**
July 31
**Orlando City SC**	**1 (5)**
Los Angeles FC	1 (4)
August 1
San Jose Earthquakes	1
**Minnesota United FC**	**4**

Semi-finals
August 5
Philadelphia Union	1
**Portland Timbers**	**2**
August 6
**Orlando City SC**	**3**
Minnesota United FC	1

Final
August 11
**Portland Timbers**	**2**
Orlando City SC	1

Final

August 11, 2020
8:30 p.m. EDT

Portland Timbers	2–1	Orlando City SC
Mabiala 27'; Župarić 66'	Report	Pereyra 39'

ESPN Wide World of Sports Complex, Bay Lake, Florida
Attendance: 0 (behind closed doors)
Referee: Ismail Elfath

====== Conference tables ======
Eastern Conference

Pos	Team	Pld	W	L	T	GF	GA	GD	Pts	PPG	Qualification
1	Philadelphia Union	23	14	4	5	44	20	+24	47	2.04	Qualification for the playoffs first round and CONCACAF Champions League (Note: As Supporters' Shield winners)
2	Toronto FC (Note: Canadian clubs could not qualify for the 2021 CONCACAF Champions League through the MLS regular season or playoffs.)	23	13	5	5	33	26	+7	44	1.91	Qualification for the playoffs first round and CONCACAF Champions League (Note: As 2020 Canadian Championship finalists (awarded by Canada Soccer))
3	Columbus Crew SC (C)	23	12	6	5	36	21	+15	41	1.78	Qualification for the playoffs first round and CONCACAF Champions League (Note: As MLS Cup 2020 champions)
4	Orlando City SC	23	11	4	8	40	25	+15	41	1.78	Qualification for the playoffs first round and Leagues Cup
5	New York City FC	23	12	8	3	37	25	+12	39	1.70	Qualification for the playoffs first round and Leagues Cup
6	New York Red Bulls	23	9	9	5	29	31	−2	32	1.39	Qualification for the playoffs first round
7	Nashville SC (Note: On June 10, 2020, Major League Soccer announced that Nashville SC would switch from the Western Conference to the Eastern Conference for the remainder of the 2020 season.)	23	8	7	8	24	22	+2	32	1.39	Qualification for the playoffs play-in round
8	New England Revolution	23	8	7	8	26	25	+1	32	1.39	Qualification for the playoffs play-in round
9	Montreal Impact	23	8	13	2	33	43	−10	26	1.13	Qualification for the playoffs play-in round
10	Inter Miami CF	23	7	13	3	25	35	−10	24	1.04	Qualification for the playoffs play-in round
11	Chicago Fire FC	23	5	10	8	33	39	−6	23	1.00	
12	Atlanta United FC	23	6	13	4	23	30	−7	22	0.96	Qualification for the 2021 CONCACAF Champions League (Note: As 2019 U.S. Open Cup champions)
13	D.C. United	23	5	12	6	25	41	−16	21	0.91	
14	FC Cincinnati	23	4	15	4	12	36	−24	16	0.70	

Source: MLS
Rules for classification: 1) points per game; 2) total wins per match played; 3) total goal differential per match played; 4) total goals scored per match played; 5) fewest disciplinary points per match played; 6) away goal differential per away match played; 7) away goals scored per away match played; 8) home goal differential per home match played; 9) home goals scored per home match played; 10) coin toss or drawing of lots.
(C) Champions
Notes:

Western Conference

Pos	Team	Pld	W	L	T	GF	GA	GD	Pts	PPG	Qualification
1	Sporting Kansas City	21	12	6	3	38	25	+13	39	1.86	Qualification for the playoffs first round and Leagues Cup
2	Seattle Sounders FC	22	11	5	6	44	23	+21	39	1.77	Qualification for the playoffs first round and Leagues Cup
3	Portland Timbers	23	11	6	6	46	35	+11	39	1.70	Qualification for the playoffs first round and 2021 CONCACAF Champions League (Note: As MLS is Back Tournament winners)
4	Minnesota United FC	21	9	5	7	36	26	+10	34	1.62	Qualification for the playoffs first round
5	Colorado Rapids	18	8	6	4	32	28	+4	28	1.56	Qualification for the playoffs first round
6	FC Dallas	22	9	6	7	28	24	+4	34	1.55	Qualification for the playoffs first round
7	Los Angeles FC	22	9	8	5	47	39	+8	32	1.45	Qualification for the playoffs first round
8	San Jose Earthquakes	23	8	9	6	35	51	−16	30	1.30	Qualification for the playoffs first round
9	Vancouver Whitecaps FC (Note: Canadian clubs could not qualify for the 2021 CONCACAF Champions League through the MLS regular season or playoffs.)	23	9	14	0	27	44	−17	27	1.17	
10	LA Galaxy	22	6	12	4	27	46	−19	22	1.00	
11	Real Salt Lake	22	5	10	7	25	35	−10	22	1.00	
12	Houston Dynamo	23	4	10	9	30	40	−10	21	0.91	

Source: MLS
Rules for classification: 1) points per game; 2) total wins per match played; 3) total goal differential per match played; 4) total goals scored per match played; 5) fewest disciplinary points per match played; 6) away goal differential per away match played; 7) away goals scored per away match played; 8) home goal differential per home match played; 9) home goals scored per home match played; 10) coin toss or drawing of lots.

====== Overall 2020 table ======
Note: the table below has no impact on playoff qualification and is used solely for determining host of the MLS Cup, certain CCL spots, the Supporters' Shield trophy, seeding in the 2021 Canadian Championship, and 2021 MLS draft. The conference tables are the sole determinant for teams qualifying for the playoffs.

2020 MLS overall standings
Pos	Team	Pld	W	L	T	GF	GA	GD	Pts	PPG	Qualification
1	Philadelphia Union (S)	23	14	4	5	44	20	+24	47	2.04	2021 CONCACAF Champions League (Note: As Supporters' Shield winners (USA2))
2	Toronto FC (V)	23	13	5	5	33	26	+7	44	1.91	2021 CONCACAF Champions League (Note: As 2020 Canadian Championship finalists (awarded by Canada Soccer) (CAN1))
3	Sporting Kansas City	21	12	6	3	38	25	+13	39	1.86	2021 Leagues Cup (Note: As 1st, Western Conference (MLS1))
4	Columbus Crew SC (C)	23	12	6	5	36	21	+15	41	1.78	2021 CONCACAF Champions League (Note: As MLS Cup 2020 champions (USA1))
5	Orlando City SC	23	11	4	8	40	25	+15	41	1.78	2021 Leagues Cup (Note: As 4th, Eastern Conference (MLS2))
6	Seattle Sounders FC	22	11	5	6	44	23	+21	39	1.77	2021 Leagues Cup (Note: As 2nd, Western Conference (MLS3))
7	New York City FC	23	12	8	3	37	25	+12	39	1.70	2021 Leagues Cup (Note: As 5th, Eastern Conference (MLS4))
8	Portland Timbers (M)	23	11	6	6	46	35	+11	39	1.70	2021 CONCACAF Champions League (Note: As MLS is Back Tournament winners (USA3))
9	Minnesota United FC	21	9	5	7	36	26	+10	34	1.62	
10	Colorado Rapids	18	8	6	4	32	28	+4	28	1.56	
11	FC Dallas	22	9	6	7	28	24	+4	34	1.55	
12	Los Angeles FC	22	9	8	5	47	39	+8	32	1.45	
13	New York Red Bulls	23	9	9	5	29	31	−2	32	1.39	
14	Nashville SC	23	8	7	8	24	22	+2	32	1.39	
15	New England Revolution	23	8	7	8	26	25	+1	32	1.39	
16	San Jose Earthquakes	23	8	9	6	35	51	−16	30	1.30	
17	Vancouver Whitecaps FC	23	9	14	0	27	44	−17	27	1.17	
18	Montreal Impact	23	8	13	2	33	43	−10	26	1.13	
19	Inter Miami CF	23	7	13	3	25	35	−10	24	1.04	
20	LA Galaxy	22	6	12	4	27	46	−19	22	1.00	
21	Real Salt Lake	22	5	10	7	25	35	−10	22	1.00	
22	Chicago Fire FC	23	5	10	8	33	39	−6	23	1.00	
23	Atlanta United FC (U)	23	6	13	4	23	30	−7	22	0.96	2021 CONCACAF Champions League (Note: As 2019 U.S. Open Cup champions (USA4))
24	D.C. United	23	5	12	6	25	41	−16	21	0.91	
25	Houston Dynamo	23	4	10	9	30	40	−10	21	0.91	
26	FC Cincinnati	23	4	15	4	12	36	−24	16	0.70	

Source: MLS
Rules for classification: 1) points per game; 2) total wins per match played; 3) total goal differential per match played; 4) total goals scored per match played; 5) fewest disciplinary points per match played; 6) away goal differential per away match played; 7) away goals scored per away match played; 8) home goal differential per home match played; 9) home goals scored per home match played; 10) coin toss or drawing of lots.
(C) Champions; (M) MLS is Back Tournament champions; (S) Supporters' Shield winners; (U) U.S. Open Cup winners; (V) Canadian Championship finalists

====== MLS Playoffs ======
First round November 21–22, 24	Conference semifinals November 29, December 1–3
E1	Philadelphia Union	0
E8	**New England Revolution**	**2**
E8	**New England Revolution**	**3**
E4	Orlando City SC	1
E4	**Orlando City SC (p)**	**1 (6)**
E5	New York City FC	1 (5)
**Eastern Conference**
E3	**Columbus Crew SC**	**3**
E6	New York Red Bulls	2
E3	**Columbus Crew SC (a.e.t.)**	**2**
E7	Nashville SC	0
E2	Toronto FC	0
E7	**Nashville SC (a.e.t.)**	**1**
W1	**Sporting Kansas City (p)**	**3 (3)**
W8	San Jose Earthquakes	3 (0)
W1	Sporting Kansas City	0
W4	**Minnesota United FC**	**3**
W4	**Minnesota United FC**	**3**
W5	Colorado Rapids	0
**Western Conference**
W3	Portland Timbers	1 (7)
W6	**FC Dallas (p)**	**1 (8)**
W6	FC Dallas	0
W2	**Seattle Sounders FC**	**1**
W2	**Seattle Sounders FC**	**3**
W7	Los Angeles FC	1

Conference finals December 6–7
E8	New England Revolution	0
E3	**Columbus Crew SC**	**1**
W4	Minnesota United FC	2
W2	**Seattle Sounders FC**	**3**

MLS Cup; December 12
E3	**Columbus Crew SC**	**3**
W2	Seattle Sounders FC	0

Note: The higher-seeded team hosted matches in the first three rounds. The team with the better regular season record hosted the final.
Source: 2020 MLS Cup Playoffs Bracket

====== MLS Cup ======
December 12, 2020
8:30 PM EST

Columbus Crew SC	3–0	Seattle Sounders FC
Zelarayán 25', 82'; Etienne 31'	Report

Mapfre Stadium, Columbus, Ohio
Attendance: 1,500
Referee: Jair Marrufo

===== USL Championship =====
Renamed from United Soccer League (USL) after the 2018 season

====== Conference tables ======
Eastern Conference

Pos	Team	Pld	W	L	T	GF	GA	GD	Pts	PPG	Qualification
1	Louisville City FC	16	11	3	2	28	12	+16	35	2.19	Conference Quarterfinals
2	Hartford Athletic	16	11	3	2	31	24	+7	35	2.19	Conference Quarterfinals
3	Pittsburgh Riverhounds SC	16	11	4	1	39	10	+29	34	2.13	Conference Quarterfinals
4	Tampa Bay Rowdies	16	10	3	3	25	11	+14	33	2.06	Conference Quarterfinals
5	Charleston Battery	15	9	3	3	26	15	+11	30	2.00	Conference Quarterfinals
6	Charlotte Independence	16	8	4	4	24	22	+2	28	1.75	Conference Quarterfinals
7	Birmingham Legion FC	16	7	5	4	29	19	+10	25	1.56	Conference Quarterfinals
8	Saint Louis FC	16	7	5	4	22	21	+1	25	1.56	Conference Quarterfinals
9	Indy Eleven	16	7	7	2	21	19	+2	23	1.44	
10	North Carolina FC	15	6	8	1	17	21	−4	19	1.27	
11	Memphis 901 FC	15	4	7	4	24	31	−7	16	1.07	
12	Sporting Kansas City II	16	5	10	1	21	30	−9	16	1.00	
13	Miami FC	16	4	8	4	20	34	−14	16	1.00	
14	New York Red Bulls II	16	5	11	0	30	37	−7	15	0.94	
15	Atlanta United 2	16	3	10	3	23	33	−10	12	0.75	
16	Philadelphia Union II	16	2	11	3	20	45	−25	9	0.56	
17	Loudoun United FC	13	1	9	3	10	28	−18	6	0.46	

Source: USL Championship
Rules for classification: 1) points per game; 2) points; 3) total wins; 4) total goal differential; 5) total goals scored; 6) disciplinary points; 7) coin toss or drawing of lots.

Western Conference

Pos	Team	Pld	W	L	T	GF	GA	GD	Pts	PPG	Qualification
1	Reno 1868 FC	16	11	2	3	43	21	+22	36	2.25	Conference Quarterfinals
2	Phoenix Rising FC	16	11	3	2	46	17	+29	35	2.19	Conference Quarterfinals
3	San Antonio FC	16	10	3	3	30	14	+16	33	2.06	Conference Quarterfinals
4	El Paso Locomotive FC	16	9	2	5	24	14	+10	32	2.00	Conference Quarterfinals
5	Sacramento Republic	16	8	2	6	27	17	+10	30	1.88	Conference Quarterfinals
6	New Mexico United	15	8	4	3	23	17	+6	27	1.80	Conference Quarterfinals
7	FC Tulsa	15	6	2	7	21	16	+5	25	1.67	Conference Quarterfinals
8	LA Galaxy II	16	8	6	2	29	32	−3	26	1.63	Conference Quarterfinals
9	Orange County SC	16	7	6	3	18	18	0	24	1.50	
10	San Diego Loyal SC	16	6	5	5	17	18	−1	23	1.44	
11	Austin Bold FC	16	5	4	7	30	26	+4	22	1.38	
12	Tacoma Defiance	16	4	10	2	25	32	−7	14	0.88	
13	Colorado Springs Switchbacks	16	2	7	7	19	28	−9	13	0.81	
14	Real Monarchs	16	3	11	2	14	25	−11	11	0.69	
15	Las Vegas Lights FC	16	2	9	5	24	34	−10	11	0.69	
16	Rio Grande Valley Toros	14	2	9	3	17	28	−11	9	0.64	
17	OKC Energy FC	16	1	8	7	12	29	−17	10	0.63	
18	Portland Timbers 2	16	3	13	0	20	50	−30	9	0.56	

Source: USL Championship
Rules for classification: 1) points per game; 2) points; 3) total wins; 4) total goal differential; 5) total goals scored; 6) disciplinary points; 7) coin toss or drawing of lots.

===== USL League One =====
Pos	Team	Pld	W	L	D	GF	GA	GD	Pts	PPG	Qualification
1	Greenville Triumph SC	16	11	3	2	24	11	+13	35	2.19	Final, 2021 U.S. Open Cup
2	Union Omaha	16	8	3	5	20	15	+5	29	1.81	Final
3	North Texas SC (Note: Professional teams that are owned by teams playing in a higher division are ineligible for the U.S. Open Cup.)	16	7	3	6	27	19	+8	27	1.69	
4	Richmond Kickers	16	8	6	2	22	22	0	26	1.63	
5	Chattanooga Red Wolves SC	15	6	5	4	21	17	+4	22	1.47	
6	FC Tucson	16	6	6	4	21	19	+2	22	1.38	
7	Forward Madison FC	16	5	5	6	20	14	+6	21	1.31	
8	Tormenta FC	16	5	7	4	19	22	−3	19	1.19	
9	New England Revolution II	16	5	8	3	19	26	−7	18	1.13	
10	Fort Lauderdale CF	16	4	9	3	19	28	−9	15	0.94	
11	Orlando City B	15	1	11	3	10	29	−19	6	0.40	

Source: 2020 USL League One standings
Rules for classification: 1) points; 2) total wins; 3) total goal differential; 4) total goals scored; 5) points earned against top four Conference finishers; 6) disciplinary points; 7) coin toss or drawing of lots

===== National Independent Soccer Association =====
====== Conference tables ======
Eastern Conference

Pos	Team	Pld	W	D	L	GF	GA	GD	Pts
1	Chattanooga FC	4	3	0	1	8	3	+5	**9**
2	Michigan Stars FC	4	2	2	0	6	2	+4	**8**
3	New York Cosmos	4	1	2	1	5	4	+1	**5**
4	Detroit City FC	4	1	2	1	3	2	+1	**5**
5	New Amsterdam FC	4	0	0	4	1	12	−11	**0**

Source: NISAofficial.com

Western Conference

Pos	Team	Pld	W	D	L	GF	GA	GD	Pts
1	Oakland Roots SC	2	1	1	0	3	1	+2	**4**
2	California United Strikers FC	2	0	2	0	1	1	0	**2**
3	Los Angeles Force	2	0	1	1	0	2	−2	**1**

Source: NISAofficial.com

====== Fall Championship ======
Group A

Pos	Team	Pld	W	D	L	GF	GA	GD	Pts	Qualification
1	Oakland Roots SC	3	2	0	1	5	2	+3	**6**	Advance to semifinals
2	Detroit City FC	3	2	0	1	6	5	+1	**6**	Advance to semifinals
3	Michigan Stars FC	3	1	1	1	4	3	+1	**4**	
4	New Amsterdam FC	3	0	1	2	4	9	−5	**1**	

Source: NISAofficial.com
Rules for classification: 1) Points, 2) Goal differential, 3) Goals scored, 4) Head-to-head record, 5) Coin toss

Group B

Pos	Team	Pld	W	D	L	GF	GA	GD	Pts	Qualification
1	Los Angeles Force	3	2	0	1	5	5	0	**6**	Advance to semifinals
2	Chattanooga FC	3	1	2	0	3	1	+2	**5**	Advance to semifinals
3	California United Strikers FC	3	1	1	1	5	4	+1	**4**	
4	New York Cosmos	3	0	1	2	1	4	−3	**1**	

Updated to match(es) played on September 28, 2020. Source: NISAofficial.com
Rules for classification: 1) Points, 2) Goal differential, 3) Goals scored, 4) Head-to-head record, 5) Coin toss

Knock-Out Round

Semifinals; September 30, 2020
**A1**	**Oakland Roots SC**	**3**
B2	Chattanooga FC	2
B1	Los Angeles Force	0
**A2**	**Detroit City FC**	**1**

Finals; October 2, 2020
A1	Oakland Roots SC	1
**A2**	**Detroit City FC**	**2**

Bold = winner
* = after extra time, ( ) = penalty shootout score
Source: nisaofficial.com

====== Final ======
October 2, 2020	**Oakland Roots SC**	**1–2**	**Detroit City FC**	Keyworth Stadium; Hamtramck, Michigan
6:00pm (EDT)	Rodriguez 26'; Harish (yellow card) 54'; Navarro (yellow card) 77'; Wier (yellow card) 80'; Irwin (yellow card) 90'	NISA Report; FotMob Report; Broadcast	Saydee (yellow card) 16'; Lawson 65'; Peterson 85'	Attendance: 0 Referee: Nicole Green
Note: Game was played behind closed doors due to the COVID-19 pandemic.

==== Cup competitions ====
===== US Open Cup =====
Due to the ongoing uncertainty surrounding the coronavirus pandemic across the world, U.S. Soccer's Open Cup Committee temporarily suspended the 2020 Lamar Hunt U.S. Open Cup, U.S. Soccer's National Championship.

On August 17 the Cup was canceled.

==== International competitions ====
===== CONCACAF competitions =====
====== 2020 CONCACAF Champions League ======
Club	Competition	Final round
Los Angeles FC	2020 CONCACAF Champions League	Runners up
New York City FC	2020 CONCACAF Champions League	Quarter-finals
Atlanta United FC	2020 CONCACAF Champions League	Quarter-finals
Seattle Sounders FC	2020 CONCACAF Champions League	Round of 16

teams in bold are still active in the competition

Round of 16

Team 1	Agg.	Team 2	1st leg	2nd leg
Motagua (Honduras)	1–4	(United States) **Atlanta United FC**	1–1	0–3
León (Mexico)	2–3	(United States) **Los Angeles FC**	2–0	0–3
San Carlos (Costa Rica)	3–6	(United States) **New York City FC**	3–5	0–1
**Olimpia** (Honduras)	4–4 (4–2 p)	(United States) Seattle Sounders FC	2–2	2–2

Quarter-finals

Team 1	Agg.	Team 2	1st leg	2nd leg
**América** (Mexico)	3–1	(United States) Atlanta United FC	3–0	0–1
**Los Angeles FC** (United States)	2–1	(Mexico) Cruz Azul		
New York City FC (United States)	0–5	(Mexico) **UANL**	0–1	0–4

Semi-finals

Team 1	Score	Team 2
**Los Angeles FC** (United States)	3–1	(Mexico) América

Final

22 December 2020
22:00

Tigres UANL (Mexico)	2–1	(United States) Los Angeles FC
Ayala 72'; Gignac 84'	Report	Rossi 61'

Exploria Stadium, Orlando
Attendance: 0 (Note: The match was played behind closed doors due to the COVID-19 pandemic in North America.)
Referee: Mario Escobar (Guatemala)

===== Leagues Cup =====
Major League Soccer announced the cancellation of the tournament on May 19, 2020, due to the ongoing COVID-19 pandemic.

Club	Competition	Final round
Philadelphia Union	2020 Leagues Cup	
D.C. United	2020 Leagues Cup	
New York Red Bulls	2020 Leagues Cup	
Real Salt Lake	2020 Leagues Cup	
Minnesota United FC	2020 Leagues Cup	
LA Galaxy	2020 Leagues Cup	
Portland Timbers	2020 Leagues Cup	

teams in bold are still active in the competition.

===== Campeones Cup =====
Major League Soccer announced the cancellation of the tournament on May 19, 2020, due to the ongoing COVID-19 pandemic.

August 12, 2020

Seattle Sounders FC (United States)	Canceled	(Mexico) 2020 Campeón de Campeones winner

CenturyLink Field, Seattle, Washington

==== Coaching changes ====
Team	Outgoing coach	Manner of departure	Date of vacancy	Position in table	Incoming coach	Date of appointment
Orlando City SC	(Republic of Ireland) James O'Connor	Sacked	October 7, 2019	Pre-season	(Colombia) Óscar Pareja	December 4, 2019
Houston Dynamo	(United States) Davy Arnaud	End of interim period	October 24, 2019	Pre-season	(United States) Tab Ramos	October 25, 2019
Montreal Impact	(Colombia) Wílmer Cabrera	Contract expired	October 24, 2019	Pre-season	(France) Thierry Henry	November 14, 2019
New York City FC	(Spain) Domènec Torrent	Mutual consent	November 8, 2019	Pre-season	(Norway) Ronny Deila	January 6, 2020
Chicago Fire FC	(Serbia) Veljko Paunović	Sacked	November 13, 2019	Pre-season	(Switzerland) Raphaël Wicky	December 27, 2019
FC Cincinnati	(Netherlands) Ron Jans	Resigned	February 18, 2020	Pre-season	(France) Yoann Damet (interim)	February 18, 2020
FC Cincinnati	(France) Yoann Damet	End of interim period	May 21, 2020	11th in East, 23rd overall	(Netherlands) Jaap Stam	May 21, 2020
Atlanta United FC	(Netherlands) Frank de Boer	Sacked	July 24, 2020	7th in East, 14th overall	(Scotland) Stephen Glass (interim)	July 27, 2020
New York Red Bulls	(United States) Chris Armas	Sacked	September 4, 2020	7th in East, 12th overall	(South Africa) Bradley Carnell (interim)	September 5, 2020
New York Red Bulls	(South Africa) Bradley Carnell	End of interim period	October 6, 2020	7th in East, 12th overall	(Austria) Gerhard Struber	October 6, 2020
D.C. United	(United States) Ben Olsen	Sacked	October 8, 2020	14th in East, 26th overall	(United States) Chad Ashton (interim)	October 8, 2020

=== Women's ===
==== League competitions ====
===== National Women's Soccer League =====
====== NWSL Challenge Cup ======
Pos	Team	Pld	W	D	L	GF	GA	GD	Pts
1	North Carolina Courage	4	4	0	0	7	1	+6	12
2	Washington Spirit	4	2	1	1	4	4	0	7
3	OL Reign	4	1	2	1	1	2	−1	5
4	Houston Dash	4	1	1	2	5	6	−1	4
5	Utah Royals FC (H)	4	1	1	2	4	5	−1	4
6	Chicago Red Stars	4	1	1	2	2	3	−1	4 (Note: Chicago Red Stars won the tiebreaker against Sky Blue FC on fewer yellow cards (1 to 4).)
7	Sky Blue FC	4	1	1	2	2	3	−1	4
8	Portland Thorns FC	4	0	3	1	2	3	−1	3

Source: NWSL
Rules for classification: Tiebreakers
(H) Host

====== Knockout round ======
Quarter-finals
July 17 – Zions Bank Stadium
Q1 North Carolina Courage	0
**Q8 Portland Thorns FC**	**1**
July 17 – Zions Bank Stadium
**Q4 Houston Dash (p)**	**0 (3)**
Q5 Utah Royals FC	0 (2)
July 18 – Zions Bank Stadium
Q3 OL Reign	0 (3)
**Q6 Chicago Red Stars (p)**	**0 (4)**
July 18 – Zions Bank Stadium
Q2 Washington Spirit	0 (3)
**Q7 Sky Blue FC (p)**	**0 (4)**

Semi-finals
July 22 – Rio Tinto Stadium
Portland Thorns FC	0
**Houston Dash**	**1**
July 22 – Rio Tinto Stadium
**Chicago Red Stars**	**3**
Sky Blue FC	2

Championship
July 26 – Rio Tinto Stadium
**Houston Dash**	**2**
Chicago Red Stars	0

====== Final ======
July 26, 2020
12:30 ET

Houston Dash	2–0	Chicago Red Stars
Schmidt 5' (pen.); Groom 90+1'	Report

Rio Tinto Stadium, Sandy, Utah
Attendance: 0 (Behind closed doors)
Referee: Katja Koroleva

====== National Women's Soccer League season ======
Season canceled.

====== NWSL Fall Series ======
The NWSL announced the full schedule of the Fall Series on September 3, 2020. One day later, the NWSL announced that the winners of the Fall Series would receive the Verizon Community Shield and a grant of $25,000 to present to their chosen community partner; $15,000 and $10,000 would be presented to community partners of the second- and third-place teams, respectively.

Pos	Team	Pld	W	D	L	GF	GA	GD	Pts	Qualification
1	Portland Thorns FC (C)	4	3	1	0	10	3	+7	10	Community Shield
2	Houston Dash	4	3	0	1	12	7	+5	9	Runners-up
3	Washington Spirit	4	2	1	1	5	4	+1	7	Third place
4	Sky Blue FC	4	2	0	2	6	7	−1	6	
5	North Carolina Courage	4	1	2	1	8	10	−2	5	
6	Chicago Red Stars	4	1	1	2	7	7	0	4	
7	OL Reign	4	1	1	2	6	8	−2	4	
8	Orlando Pride	4	0	2	2	5	8	−3	2	
9	Utah Royals FC	4	0	2	2	3	8	−5	2	

Source: NWSL
Rules for classification: Tiebreakers
(C) Champions

==== Coaching changes ====
Team	Outgoing manager	Manner of departure	Date of vacancy	Incoming manager	Date of appointment	Ref.
Reign FC	(North Macedonia) Vlatko Andonovski	Resignation	October 28, 2019	(France) Farid Benstiti	January 17, 2020	
Sky Blue FC	(England) Freya Coombe	End of interim period	December 17, 2019	(England) Freya Coombe	December 17, 2019	
Utah Royals FC	(England) Laura Harvey	Mutual separation	January 6, 2020	(England) Scott Parkinson (interim)	January 6, 2020	
Utah Royals FC	(England) Scott Parkinson (interim)	End of interim period	February 7, 2020	(England) Craig Harrington	February 7, 2020	

== Honors ==
=== Professional ===
Men
Competition		Winner
U.S. Open Cup		canceled
MLS Supporters' Shield		Philadelphia Union
MLS Cup		Columbus Crew SC
MLS is Back Tournament		Portland Timbers
USL Championship	Regular season	not awarded
USL Championship	Playoffs	Tampa Bay Rowdies (Eastern Conference); Phoenix Rising FC (Western Conference)
USL League One	Regular season	Greenville Triumph SC
USL League One	Playoffs	Greenville Triumph SC
NISA	Spring 2020	suspended
NISA	Fall 2020	Detroit City FC

Women
Competition	Winner
NWSL Challenge Cup	Houston Dash
National Women's Soccer League	regular season canceled
NWSL Fall series	Portland Thorns FC
Women's Premier Soccer League	canceled
United Women's Soccer	canceled

=== Amateur ===
Men
Competition	Team
USL League Two	canceled
National Premier Soccer League	canceled
National Amateur Cup	canceled
NCAA Division I Soccer Championship	Marshall
NCAA Division II Soccer Championship	canceled
NCAA Division III Soccer Championship	canceled
NAIA Soccer Championship	Missouri Valley

Women
Competition	Team
NCAA Division I Soccer Championship	Santa Clara
NCAA Division II Soccer Championship	canceled
NCAA Division III Soccer Championship	canceled
NAIA Soccer Championship	Keiser Seahawks
