= College Cup Most Outstanding Player =

The College Cup Most Outstanding Player may refer to:

- NCAA Division I Men's Soccer Tournament Most Outstanding Player
- NCAA Division I Women's Soccer Tournament Most Outstanding Player

== See also ==
- College Cup
