= Escuela Americana =

Escuela Americana (Spanish; used to mean "American school") may refer to:

- Escuela Americana El Salvador (San Salvador)
- American School of Tegucigalpa
