= Brianne Reed =

Dominican footballer (born 1994)

Personal information
- Full name: Brianne Taylor Reed Pérez
- Date of birth: 2 May 1994 (age 32)
- Place of birth: Tinton Falls, New Jersey, U.S.
- Height: 1.68 m (5 ft 6 in)
- Position: Centre back

Team information
- Current team: Whitecaps FC Elite

College career
Years	Team	Apps	(Gls)
2012–2015	Rutgers Scarlet Knights	87	(3)

Senior career*
Years	Team	Apps	(Gls)
2016–2017	FC Kansas City	7	(0)
2017	Kvarnsvedens IK	11	(0)
2018	Eskilstuna United	0	(0)
2018	Västerås BK30	11	(1)
2019–2023	Nordsjælland	72	(0)
2023	South Melbourne FC	21	(3)
2024	Damaiense	8	(0)
2024	Whitecaps FC Elite	1	(0)

International career^{‡}
2021–	Dominican Republic	18	(1)
- * Club domestic league appearances and goals as of 20 July 2024 ‡ National team caps and goals as of 414 April 2026

Brianne Taylor Reed Pérez (born 2 May 1994) is a professional footballer who plays as a centre back. Born in the United States, she plays for the Dominican Republic women's national team.

== Early life ==
Born and raised in Tinton Falls, New Jersey to an African-American father and a Dominican mother, Reed attended Red Bank Catholic High School. A three-year starter on the varsity soccer team, she helped lead the team to two consecutive Shore Conference titles in 2009 and 2010 and well as three consecutive league championship appearances. In 2010, the team won the Co-State Championship. Reed also was on the varsity track team and was 2012 Monmouth County Triple and Long Jump Champion.

Reed played for club teams Ocean SA Eagles, Wall SC Wombats and PDA Charge. In 2010 she won the New Jersey Olympic Development Program (ODP) state championship and was a member of the finalist team at the 2011 ODP National Championship. She was named to the First Team All-Shore Conference by the Asbury Park Press for two consecutive years in 2010 and 2011. In 2011, she was named to the First Team All-State by The Star-Ledger and received the John Cobb Senior Excellence Award. In 2012, she was the recipient of the Monmouth County Director of Athletics Sportsmanship Award and Jersey Sporting News Player of the Year.

== College career ==
Reed attended Rutgers University from 2012 to 2016 where she played for the Rutgers Scarlet Knights. During her freshman season, she made 19 appearances. The following year, she started in all 22 matches and scored her first collegiate goal against the University of Connecticut on 24 October 2013. In 2014, she started all 20 matches playing in the centerback position. She was named to the 2014 All-Big Ten First Team and received the Rutgers Junior Female Athlete of the Year Award. The same year, she was named Third Team National Soccer Coaches Association of America (NSCAA) All-American. During her senior season, Reed started all 26 matches. In November 2015, her flip throw-in led to the team's first goal against the Ohio State Buckeyes during the semifinal of the Big Ten Women's Soccer Tournament. Playing in the centerback position, she anchored a defense that recorded a new school record of 770:16 minutes of shutout spanning the team's first nine matches. Reed was a candidate for the Hermann Trophy and ranked the No. 24 player in the country by TopDrawerSoccer.com. She was the recipient of the 2015 Senior CLASS Award and was named to the NSCAA First Team All-Great Lakes Region as well as the All-Big Ten Conference First Team.

== Club career ==
Reed was drafted by FC Kansas City as the 18th pick in the 2016 NWSL College Draft. She signed with Kansas City ahead of the 2016 season.

Reed was transferred to Kvarnsveden IK from FC Kansas City on 21 July 2017.

On 20 December 2017 she signed with Eskilstuna United but never played a single game for the club.

In August 2018 she signed for Elitettan side Västerås BK 30 where she played for the rest of the 2018 season.

In January 2019 she signed for Danish Elitedivisionen club FC Nordsjælland. She stayed at the club for four seasons winning the Danish Women's Cup during the 2020 season.

On 22 January 2023 she signed with Australian side South Melbourne FC

In 2024, she played with Portuguese club Damaiense in the Campeonato Nacional Feminino.

In July 2024, she joined the Whitecaps FC Girls Elite in League1 British Columbia, making her debut on July 20 against Rivers FC.

In January 2025, she announced her retirement from playing at club level, but would continue to play at international level for the Dominican Republic.

== International career ==
On 30 June 2021, Reed was called up by the Dominican Republic.
