= Yale Bulldogs women's soccer =

American college soccer team

- Founded: 1977; 49 years ago
- University: Yale University
- Head coach: Sarah Martinez (5th season)
- Conference: Ivy
- Location: New Haven, Connecticut, US
- Stadium: Reese Stadium (capacity: 3,000)
- Nickname: Bulldogs
- Colors: Yale blue and white
Home	Away

NCAA tournament Round of 16
- 2005

NCAA tournament Round of 32
- 2002, 2005

NCAA tournament appearances
- 2002, 2004, 2005

Conference regular season championships
- 1992, 2005

The Yale Bulldogs women's soccer program represents Yale University in all NCAA Division I women's College soccer competitions. Founded in 1977, the Bulldogs compete in the Ivy League.

The Bulldogs are coached by Sarah Martinez, who was hired as the program's head coach on December 3, 2019. Yale plays their home matches at Reese Stadium, on the campus of Yale University.

== History ==
Yale's first varsity season started in 1977, led by Roberto Taylor. Their first win came on October 5 with a 5–1 victory over Vassar. The first home goal was scored by Cynthia Hayden in a 2–2 overtime tie with Tufts on October 8.

In 1979, Elizabeth Traver set a school record with 18 goals while earning All-Ivy recognition. Traver ended her career with 39 goals and 99 points, both of which remain career records.

During the 1980 season, the Bulldogs achieved a 17–0 victory over Rhode Island College, setting an Ivy League record for the most goals in a game.

In the 1991 season, Laura Valade became Yale's first Ivy League Player of the Year.

In 1992, Yale earned its first Ivy League Championship, tying Brown with a 6–1 record. The Bulldogs finished 13–5 under captain Amy Predmore, and Jen Teti was named Ivy League Player of the Year.

The 2002 squad finished 12-5-2 and earned its first NCAA Tournament appearance. They won their first game on penalty kicks against Villanova before falling to Nebraska 1-0 in the second round.

The 2004 squad finished 13–5 and made their second NCAA Tournament appearance but lost in the first round to Villanova, 2-1.

In 2005, Yale reclaimed the Ivy League title with a 5-1-1 record and advanced to the NCAA Tournament. They won their first-round game 3–0 against Central Connecticut and upset No. 3 Duke 2-1 in the second round, with Crysi Howser scoring a goal with one second remaining. In the Sweet 16, they fell to the defending national champions, Notre Dame, 5-2.

== Rudy Meredith College Admissions Bribery Scandal ==
Former coach Rudy Meredith was indicted as part of the 2019 college admissions bribery scandal, for allegedly accepting bribes totaling hundreds of thousands of dollars to facilitate the admission of students to Yale as soccer players recruited to the Yale women's soccer team, despite their never having played competitive soccer. He pled guilty. Because he is cooperating with prosecutors, he may avoid the maximum penalties of 20 years in prison and $250,000 fines each of the charges carry, but he will have to forfeit the $850,000 in bribes he took in the scheme.

== Rivalries ==
Harvard and Yale have met 47 times and Yale has a record of 9-36-2. Yale's last win was in 2017.

== Players ==
=== Current roster ===
As of November 2026

Note: Flags indicate national team as defined under FIFA eligibility rules; some limited exceptions apply. Players may hold more than one non-FIFA nationality.

No.	Pos.	Nation	Player
00	GK	USA	Kyla Holmes
1	GK	USA	Anna Shamgochian
2	MF	USA	Peyton O'Shaughnessy
3	MF	USA	Hope McMillin
4	DF	USA	Tana Sands
5	DF	USA	Andie Miller
6	DF	USA	Eloise Stone
7	DF	USA	Alex Chang
8	FW	USA	Selma Larbi
9	MF	USA	Yurika Ishibe
10	MF	CAN	Cindy Yang
11	MF	USA	Nia Freeman
12	FW	USA	JoJo DeNegri

No.	Pos.	Nation	Player
13	GK	USA	Isabel Willems
14	MF	USA	Phebe Ryan
15	FW	ISL	Anita Thorvaldsdottir
16	MF	USA	Aubrey Scoble
17	MF	NOR	Karoline Hernes
19	FW	USA	Abigail Solomon
20	FW	USA	Addison Bray
21	DF	USA	Alicia So
22	FW	USA	Kyleigh Carr
23	GK	USA	Mikayla Morse
26	FW	USA	Reagan Exley
29	MF	USA	Avery Johnson
32	DF	USA	Amelia Warren

== Coaches ==
=== Coaching history ===
Yale University has had seven coaches in their program's existence.

As of March 4th, 2025

#	Years	Coach	W	L	T
1	1977	Roberto Taylor	5	5	2
2	1978–1980	Chico Chacurian	17	16	7
3	1981–1984	Margaret Dunlop	20	34	2
4	1985–1994	Felice Duffey	60	89	3
5	1995–2018	Rudy Meredith	224	157	35
6	2019	Brendan Faherty	11	4	1
7	2020–Present	Sarah Martinez	23	32	9

== Honors ==
=== Conference championships ===
Title No.	Season	Organizer	Class	Coach
1	1992	Ivy League	Regular season	Felice Duffy
2	2005	Ivy League	Regular season	Rudy Meredith

=== All Americans ===
Year	Player	Team
1992	Jen Teti	2nd Team
1993	Jen Teti	2nd Team
2005	Christina Huang	2nd Team
2005	Aerial Chavarin	2nd Team

=== Ivy League Player of the Year ===
Year	Player
1991	Laura Valade
1992	Jen Teti
1993	Jen Teti
2009	Becky Brown

=== Ivy League Awards ===
Year	Player	Award
1996	Lorelei Wall	Rookie of the Year
2005	Crysti Howser	Rookie of the Year
2009	Kristen Forster	Rookie of the Year
2011	Melissa Gavin	Rookie of the Year
2014	Elise Wilcox	Defensive Player of the Year
2016	Aerial Chavarin	Rookie of the Year
2017	Michelle Alozie	Offensive Player of the Year
2019	Aerial Chavarin	Defensive Player of the Year

== Seasons ==
=== NCAA Tournament history ===
Yale has appeared in three NCAA Tournaments. Their most recent appearance came in 2005.

Year	Record	Region	Round	Opponent	Results
2002		1	First round	Villanova	0-0 (Yale wins PK)
2002		1	Second round	Nebraska	0–1
2004		1	First round	Villanova	0–1
2005		1	First round	Central Connecticut	3-0
2005		1	Second round	Duke	2-1
2005		1	Quarterfinals	Notre Dame	2–5

== Professional Players ==
Years	Player	Position
1997–2000	Ciara McCormack	DF
2001–2005	Eleni Benson	DF
2011–2014	Meredith Speck	MF
2014–2017	Carlin Hudson	DF
2015–2018	Michelle Alozie	FW
2016–2019	Aerial Chavarin	MF
2017–2021	Reina Bonta	DF
2019–2022	Giovanna Dionicio	DF
