= Dominican Republic women's national football team =

Women's national football team representing the Dominican Republic

Dominican Republic
- Nickname: Las Quisqueyanas (The Quisqueyanas)
- Association: Dominican Football Federation
- Confederation: CONCACAF (North, Central America and Caribbean)
- Head coach: Henry Parra
- Captain: Vanessa Kara
- Top scorer: Betzaida Ubri (15)
- FIFA code: DOM
First colours	Second colours

FIFA ranking
- Current: 93 ▲1 (16 June 2026)
- Highest: 81 (March 2009)
- Lowest: 113 (December 2021)

First international
- Dominican Republic 2–2 Saint Lucia (Port-au-Prince, Haiti; 10 July 2002)

Biggest win
- Dominican Republic 17–0 British Virgin Islands (Santo Domingo Este, Dominican Republic; 5 October 2007)

Biggest defeat
- United States 14–0 Dominican Republic (Vancouver, Canada; 20 January 2012)

CONCACAF W Championship / CONCACAF W Gold Cup
- Appearances: 1 (first in 2024)
- Best result: Group stage (2024)

The Dominican Republic women's national football team (Spanish: Selección femenina de fútbol de República Dominicana) represents the Dominican Republic in international women's football. The team is governed by the Dominican Football Federation (Spanish: Federación Dominicana de Fútbol) and competes in CONCACAF (the Confederation of North, Central American, and Caribbean Association Football) women's competitions.

== History ==
=== The beginning ===
The Dominican team played its first international match in 2002 against Saint Lucia, as a part of the Caribbean Football Union qualifying tournament for the 2002 CONCACAF Women's Gold Cup; the result was a 2–2 draw. On matchday two the team faced the Bahamian Team, achieving their first-ever win with a score of three to nil. They lost their last group game to Haiti, conceding two goals to end third after Saint Lucia surpassed them due to a superior goal difference. A year later, the team entered the CONCACAF Women's Pre-Olympic Tournament qualification for the first time, with the Dominican Republic hosting Haiti for two matches in the Estadio Panamericano. It suffered a 2–10 aggregate defeat against the inaugural CFU women's Caribbean Cup Champions Haiti. After the first match's seven-nil loss, the Dominicans fought well in their second-leg game, losing 2–3 in a match where they led 2–1 at halftime.

=== Improvement ===
the 2006 CONCACAF Women's Gold Cup Qualifying marked an improvement as the Dominican Republic topped the first round Group A undefeated, advancing to the second round they been drawn together with the Host Trinidad and Tobago and Suriname. Los Quisqueyanos kicked their second round with a two-nil win against Suriname. losing to the Tobagonian team to end second after Trinidad and Tobago, which qualified for the final tournament. the 2008 CONCACAF Women's Olympic Qualifying Tournament qualification saw a better performance from the team. as they won their first game four to nil against the U.S. Virgin Islands, their second match was a historical moment for the women's football in the Dominican Republic, as the National team trashed the British Virgin Islands by a scoreline never before seen in the entire CONCACAF region for international football. The margin of 17 clear goals, while keeping a clean sheet, is unrivaled in football in the history of the game across the CONCACAF region in all international competitions. with their final and decisive match against Cuba. the team dominated the first half scoring the first goal however Cuba Managed to score the equalizer and a last-minute goal to eliminate the Dominicans. 2011 marked history for the Dominican team as they qualified for their first CONCACAF tournament (2012 CONCACAF Women's Olympic Qualifying Tournament) after finishing top of the group B undefeated beating Dominica, Bermuda and Trinidad and Tobago. qualifying for the first continental tournament, Dominican Republic was drawn with the world's most successful team the United States. Mexico and Cuba. the team opened its tournament with a 0–14 loss against the United States which is the biggest defeat the team has received in its history. losing the two other matches the Dominican Republic finished last. in the last years, the Dominican team maintains a good performance, the team entered several tournaments including the 2014 Central American and Caribbean Games, CONCACAF Women's Olympic Qualifying Championships qualification, and CONCACAF W championship qualification finishing second.

== Results and fixtures ==
The following is a list of match results in the last 12 months, as well as any future matches that have been scheduled.

Legend

Win Draw Loss Fixture

=== 2025 ===
2 December 2025 CONCACAF W Championship qualification	Dominican Republic	2–2	Suriname	Moca, Dominican Republic
	Asenjo 16', 85'	Report (FIFA); Report (CONCACAF)	Hoekstra 3'; Dompig 5'	Stadium: Estadio Complejo Deportivo Moca 86; Referee: Lizzet García (Mexico)

== Coaching staff ==
=== Current coaching staff ===
As of 25 December 2025

Role	Name
Head coach	Betzaida Ubri

=== Manager history ===
- (Dominican Republic) Diego Gutierrez
- (Spain) Jose Rubio (2021-2022)
- (Colombia) Henry Parra (????-)

Name	Period	Matches	Wins	Draws	Losses	Winning %	Notes	Ref.
(Spain) Jose Rubio	2021–2022	0	0	0	0	0%		

(If statistics are unavailable, display former coaches in bulleted list form)

== Players ==
=== Current squad ===
The following 23 players were named to the roster for the 2026 CONCACAF W Championship qualification in December 2025.
Caps and goals accurate up to 5 December 2023 vs. Bermuda

No.	Pos.	Player	Date of birth (age)	Caps	Goals	Club
	GK	Odaliana Gómez	19 June 2004 (age 22)	6	0	(United States Soccer Federation) FIU Panthers
	GK	Paloma Peña	20 February 2005 (age 21)	1	0	(United States Soccer Federation) Florida Gators
	GK	Jaylene Rondón				(United States Soccer Federation) New York Soccer Club
	DF	Natalie Bruno				(United States Soccer Federation) Team Boca
	DF	Gabriella Cuevas	15 August 1993 (age 33)	14	2	(United States Soccer Federation) AP2T
	DF	Nadia Colón	8 September 2002 (age 24)	10	0	(United States Soccer Federation) Florida FC
	DF	Brianne Reed	2 May 1994 (age 32)	14	1	(United States Soccer Federation) AP2T
	DF	Giovanna Dionicio	20 September 2001 (age 25)	10	1	(United States Soccer Federation) Sporting CT
	DF	Gabriella Marte	27 January 2003 (age 23)	6	0	(United States Soccer Federation) Hofstra Pride
	DF	Livia De León				(Canadian Soccer Association) Royal Select Beauport
	MF	Jaylen Vallecillo	23 April 2006 (age 20)	6	1	(United States Soccer Federation) St. John's University
	MF	Winibian Peralta	19 August 1997 (age 29)	20	2	(Mexican Football Federation) Necaxa
	MF	Jazlyn Oviedo	25 March 2002 (age 24)	11	1	(United States Soccer Federation) Vermont Catamounts
	MF	Kathrynn González	12 July 2000 (age 26)	6	4	(United States Soccer Federation) Fort Lauderdale United FC
	MF	Stella Tapia	15 February 2005 (age 21)	0	0	(United States Soccer Federation) Michigan Wolverines
	MF	Mia Castaneda				(United States Soccer Federation) Manhattan Soccer Club
	MF	Yomerci Brito	11 August 2001 (age 25)	0	0	(Dominican Football Federation) CDR 5 de Abril
	FW	Alyssa Oviedo	18 August 2000 (age 26)	11	7	(Mexican Football Federation) Puebla
	FW	Mía Asenjo	7 March 2003 (age 23)	4	4	(Royal Spanish Football Federation) DUX Logroño
	FW	Liliane Clase	29 July 2003 (age 23)	6	0	(United States Soccer Federation) Texas Southern Tigers
	FW	Jazmin Jackson	24 November 2004 (age 21)	4	4	(United States Soccer Federation) VCU Rams
	FW	Josefien Slump				(Royal Dutch Football Association) FC Groningen Vrouwen
	FW	Kiomy Luperón	9 September 2003 (age 23)	0	0	(Portuguese Football Federation) Clube de Albegaria

=== Recent call-ups ===
The following players have also been called up to the Dominican Republic squad within the last 12 months.

Pos.	Player	Date of birth (age)	Caps	Goals	Club	Latest call-up
^{PRE}: Pre-called up.

== Records ==
As of 30 November 2022

*Players in bold are still active, at least at club level.

=== Most capped players ===
#	Player	Year(s)	Caps	Goals

=== Top goalscorers ===
#	Player	Year(s)	Goals	Caps
1	Betzaida Ubri	2010–?	19	25
2	**Alyssa Oviedo**	2018–present	10	12
3	Yaqueisi Núñez	2011–?	8	
4	Elizabeth Martínez	2007–?	+6	?
5	**Vanessa Kara**	2021–present	+5	8
5	Ana Frías	2007–2012	+5	14
7	Manuela Lareo	2021–2022	4	6
8	**Dayari Balbuena**	2019–present	+3	4
8	Oliva Santana	2007–?	+3	?
8	Raynelsa Peralta	2007–?	+3	?
8	Yajaira Astacio	2007–?	+3	?
8	Yocelyn Rodríguez	2007–?	+3	?

== Competitive record ==
=== FIFA Women's World Cup ===
FIFA Women's World Cup record
Year	Result	Pld	W	D*	L	GF	GA
(China) 1991	Did not enter						
(Sweden) 1995	Did not enter						
(United States) 1999	Did not enter						
(United States) 2003	Did not qualify						
(China) 2007	Did not qualify						
(Germany) 2011	Did not qualify						
(Canada) 2015	Did not qualify						
(France) 2019	Did not qualify						
(Australia) (New Zealand) 2023	Did not qualify						
(Brazil) 2027	Did not qualify						
(Costa Rica) (Jamaica) (Mexico) (United States) 2031	To be determined						
(United Kingdom) 2035	To be determined						
Total	–	–	–	–	–	–	–

*Draws include knockout matches decided on penalty kicks.

=== Olympic Games ===
Summer Olympics record									Qualifying record					
Year	Round	Position	Pld	W	D*	L	GF	GA	Pld	W	D*	L	GF	GA
(United States) 1996	Did not enter								1995 FIFA WWC					
(Australia) 2000	Did not enter								1999 FIFA WWC					
(Greece) 2004	Did not qualify								2	0	0	2	2	10
(China) 2008	Did not qualify								3	2	0	1	22	2
(United Kingdom) 2012	Did not qualify								6	3	0	3	5	27
(Brazil) 2016	Did not qualify								2	1	0	1	11	6
(Japan) 2020	Did not qualify								4	2	2	0	4	0
(France) 2024	Did not qualify								2022 CONCACAF W Championship					
(United States) 2028	Did not qualify								2026 CONCACAF W Championship					
Total	–	–	–	–	–	–	–	–	17	8	2	7	44	45

*Draws include knockout matches decided on penalty kicks.

=== CONCACAF W Championship ===
CONCACAF W Championship record								Qualification record					
Year	Result	Pld	W	D*	L	GF	GA	Pld	W	D*	L	GF	GA
(Haiti) 1991	Did not enter							Did not enter					
(United States) 1993	Did not enter							Did not enter					
(Canada) 1994	Did not enter							Did not enter					
(Canada) 1998	Did not enter							Did not enter					
(United States) 2000	Did not enter							Did not enter					
(United States) (Canada) 2002	Did not qualify							3	1	1	1	5	4
(United States) 2006	Did not qualify							5	4	0	1	13	9
(Mexico) 2010	Did not qualify							2	1	0	1	4	3
(United States) 2014	Did not qualify							2014 Caribbean Cup					
(United States) 2018	Did not qualify							4	2	1	1	7	5
(Mexico) 2022	Did not qualify							4	3	0	1	15	5
(United States) 2026	Did not qualify							4	2	2	0	17	4
Total	–	–	–	–	–	–	–	22	13	4	5	61	30

*Draws include knockout matches decided on penalty kicks.

=== CONCACAF W Gold Cup ===
CONCACAF W Gold Cup record								Qualification record							
Year	Result	GP	W	D*	L	GF	GA	Division	Group	GP	W	D*	L	GF	GA
(United States) 2024	Group stage	3	0	0	3	0	16	B	C	7	6	0	1	25	3
(N/A) 2029	To be determined							To be determined							
Total	1/1	3	0	0	3	0	16	–	–	7	6	0	1	25	3

*Draws include knockout matches decided on penalty kicks.

=== Pan American Games ===
Pan American Games record
Year	Result	Pld	W	D*	L	GF	GA
(Canada) 1999	Did not enter						
(Dominican Republic) 2003	Did not enter						
(Brazil) 2007	Did not enter						
(Mexico) 2011	Did not qualify						
(Canada) 2015	Did not qualify						
(Peru) 2019	Did not qualify						
(Chile) 2023	Did not qualify						
Total	–	–	–	–	–	–	–

*Draws include knockout matches decided on penalty kicks.

=== Central American and Caribbean Games ===
Central American and Caribbean Games record
Year	Result	Pld	W	D*	L	GF	GA
(Puerto Rico) 2010	Did not enter						
(Mexico) 2014	Group stage	3	0	0	3	3	13
(Colombia) 2018	Did not enter						
(El Salvador) 2023	Did not enter						
(Dominican Republic) 2026	Qualified						
Total	Group stage	3	0	0	3	3	13

*Draws include knockout matches decided on penalty kicks.

=== CFU Women's Caribbean Cup ===
CFU Women's Caribbean Cup record
Year	Result	Pld	W	D*	L	GF	GA
(Haiti) 2000	Did not enter						
(Trinidad and Tobago) 2014	First round	2	1	0	1	7	7
2018	Withdrew						
Total	First round	2	1	0	1	7	7

*Draws include knockout matches decided on penalty kicks.

== See also ==
- Sport in the Dominican Republic
  - Football in the Dominican Republic
    - Women's football in the Dominican Republic
- Dominican Republic women's national under-23 football team
- Dominican Republic women's national under-20 football team
- Dominican Republic women's national under-17 football team
- Dominican Republic men's national football team
