= JLo Varada =

Puerto Rican footballer (born 2003)

Personal information
- Full name: JLo Ann Varada Vázquez
- Date of birth: February 2, 2003 (age 23)
- Place of birth: San Juan, Puerto Rico
- Height: 1.75 m (5 ft 9 in)
- Position: Goalkeeper

Team information
- Current team: Campbell Fighting Camels
- Number: 35

Youth career
- 2018–2021: IMG Academy

College career
Years	Team	Apps	(Gls)
2021	Florida Gators	0	(0)
2023–	Campbell Fighting Camels	24	(0)

International career^{‡}
2018–	Puerto Rico	5	(0)
- ‡ National team caps and goals as of July 3, 2021

JLo Ann Varada Vázquez (born February 2, 2003) is a Puerto Rican footballer who plays as a goalkeeper for the Puerto Rico women's national team.

== Early life ==
Born in San Juan, Varada attended Escuela Rafael Hernández Marín and later Academia María Reina. In 2018, she was invited to join the IMG Academy's soccer program and moved to Bradenton, Florida.

== International career ==
In May 2018, Varada made her senior debut for the Puerto Rican women's national football team in a 5–0 2018 CONCACAF Women's Championship qualifier victory against Aruba. Later the same year, she played in two friendlies against Argentina on August 30 and September 2.

In 2021, Varada appeared in friendlies against the Dominican Republic and Uruguay.
