= Gabriella Marte =

Dominican footballer

Personal information
- Full name: Gabriella Christine Marte Morrison
- Date of birth: 27 January 2003 (age 23)
- Place of birth: Wilson, North Carolina, United States
- Height: 1.70 m (5 ft 7 in)
- Positions: Left back; midfielder

Team information
- Current team: Hofstra Pride
- Number: 4

Youth career
- 2016–2021: Caravel HS
- 2018: Delaware FC
- 2019–2021: Penn Fusion SA

College career
Years	Team	Apps	(Gls)
2021–	Hofstra Pride	21	(1)

International career^{‡}
2017–2022	Dominican Republic U20	5	(0)
2019–	Dominican Republic	10	(0)
- ‡ National team caps and goals as of 14 April 2026

Gabriella Christine Marte Morrison (born 27 January 2003), also known as Gabby Marte, is an American-born Dominican footballer who plays as a left back for Hofstra Pride and the Dominican Republic women's national team.

== International career ==
Marte has appeared for the Dominican Republic at the 2020 CONCACAF Women's Olympic Qualifying Championship qualification.

== Personal life ==
Marte was born in the United States to a Dominican father and an American mother.
