= Nadia Colón =

Dominican footballer (born 2002)

Personal information
- Full name: Nadia Neve Colón Reyes
- Date of birth: 8 September 2002 (age 24)
- Place of birth: Cooper City, Florida, United States
- Height: 5 ft 2 in (1.57 m)
- Position: Left back

Youth career
- Sunrise Prime FC

College career
Years	Team	Apps	(Gls)
2020–2023	UTRGV Vaqueros	69	(0)

Senior career*
Years	Team	Apps	(Gls)
2025	Calgary Foothills WFC	6	(0)

International career^{‡}
2020–2022	Dominican Republic U20	8	(0)
2021–	Dominican Republic	15	(0)
- * Club domestic league appearances and goals as of 11 July 2025 ‡ National team caps and goals as of 26 February 2024

Nadia Neve Colón Reyes (born 8 September 2002) is a footballer who plays as a left back. Born in the United States, she represents the Dominican Republic at international level.

== Early life ==
Colón played youth soccer with Sunrise Prime FC. She attended Archbishop Edward A. McCarthy High School in Florida, winning the Florida 5A State Championship in 2020.

== College career ==
In 2020, Colón began attending the University of Texas Rio Grande Valley, where she played for the women's soccer team. She made her collegiate debut on February 10, 2021 against the Texas A&M–Corpus Christi Islanders and recorded her first assist on February 25, 2021 in a victory over the Chicago State Cougars.

== Club career ==
In 2025, Colón joined the Calgary Foothills WFC in League1 Alberta.

== International career ==
Born in the United States, Colón is also eligible to represent the Dominican Republic, where her grandmother was born.

Colón began her international career with the Dominican Republic U20 at the 2020 CONCACAF Women's U-20 Championship, helping the team reach the semi-finals, then also re-joining the squad two years later at the 2022 CONCACAF Women's U-20 Championship.

She made her senior debut for the senior team on 7 July 2021 against Nicaragua. In February 2022, she was called up for the 2022 CONCACAF W Championship qualification tournament.
