= Liliane Clase =

Dominican footballer

Personal information
- Full name: Liliane Lisbeth Clase Báez
- Date of birth: 29 July 2003 (age 23)
- Position: Right winger

Team information
- Current team: Texas Southern Tigers

College career
Years	Team	Apps	(Gls)
2021–2022	Angelina College	33	(22)
2023–	Texas Southern Tigers	19	(5)

Senior career*
Years	Team	Apps	(Gls)
- Delfines del Este

International career^{‡}
2020–	Dominican Republic U20	3	(2)
2019–	Dominican Republic	2	(0)
- * Club domestic league appearances and goals ‡ National team caps and goals as of 26 February 2020

Liliane Lisbeth Clase Báez (born 29 July 2003) is a Dominican footballer who plays as a right winger for Texas Southern Tigers and the Dominican Republic women's national team.

== International career ==
Clase has appeared for the Dominican Republic at the 2020 CONCACAF Women's Olympic Qualifying Championship qualification.
