= Jazlyn Oviedo =

Dominican footballer (born 2002)

Personal information
- Full name: Jazlyn Alexa Oviedo Reyes
- Date of birth: March 25, 2002 (age 24)
- Place of birth: Clifton, New Jersey, United States
- Height: 1.68 m (5 ft 6 in)
- Position: Midfielder

Team information
- Current team: Vermont Catamounts
- Number: 18

Youth career
- –2019: DePaul Catholic High School

College career
Years	Team	Apps	(Gls)
2020–2021	Monmouth Hawks	20	(0)
2022–	Vermont Catamounts	19	(0)

International career^{‡}
- Dominican Republic U20
2019–	Dominican Republic	11	(1)
- ‡ National team caps and goals as of 13 April 2026

Jazlyn Alexa Oviedo Reyes (born March 25, 2002) is a footballer who plays as a midfielder for college team Vermont Catamounts. Born and raised in the United States to a Peruvian father and a Dominican mother, she is a member of the Dominican Republic women's national team.

== International career ==
Oviedo has appeared for the Dominican Republic at the 2020 CONCACAF Women's Olympic Qualifying Championship qualification.

=== International goals ===
Scores and results list Dominican Republic's goal tally first.

No.	Date	Venue	Opponent	Score	Result	Competition
1	4 October 2019	Ato Boldon Stadium, Couva, Trinidad and Tobago	Antigua and Barbuda	2–0	2–0	2020 CONCACAF Women's Olympic Qualifying Championship qualification

== Personal life ==
Oviedo was born in the United States to a Peruvian father and a Dominican mother. Raised in Clifton, New Jersey, Oviedo played prep soccer for DePaul Catholic High School. Her sister Alyssa Oviedo is also a member of the Dominican Republic women's national football team.
