= Escuela Americana El Salvador =

International school in San Salvador, El Salvador

Coordinates: 13.6964°N 89.2403°W

Escuela Americana El Salvador (EA; "American School El Salvador") is an American international school in San Salvador, serving grades PreK-12. it consists of three divisions: Pre-Kindergarten through 5th grade in the lower school, 6th through 8th grade in the middle school, and 9th through 12th grade in the upper school. Established in 1946, it is governed by the Asociación Escuela Americana.

The 16 manzana (about 35-hectare (86-acre)) campus is located in Colonia San Benito, La Mascota.

== Student body ==
As of 2015, the school has a total of 1,610 students, including 793 in the lower school, 364 in the middle school, and 453 in the upper school. The makeup of the student body is 76% Salvadoran, 15% Americans and Canadians, and 9% students from 27 other countries as of the 2012-2013 school year.

== Staff ==
As of 2015 there are 142 full-time teaching staff, along with four part-time teaching staff. Of the teachers, 76% are Salvadorans, 29% are Americans and Canadians, and 3% originate from other countries.
