= College Cup =

College Cup may refer to the semifinals and final of either of the following events:

- NCAA Division I men's soccer tournament
- NCAA Division I women's soccer tournament
