= Dominican Republic women's national under-20 football team =

Association women's youth football team from Puerto Rico

Dominican Republic Women's U-20
- Association: Federación Dominicana de Fútbol
- Confederation: CONCACAF
- Head coach: (Spain) José Benito Rubido
- Captain: Jazlyn Oviedo
- FIFA code: DOM
First colours	Second colours

First international
- Dominican Republic 0–8 Antigua and Barbuda (Antigua, Antigua and Barbuda; 17 January 2002)

Biggest win
- Dominican Republic 6–0 Saint Kitts and Nevis (San Cristóbal, Dominican Republic; 28 July 2015)

Biggest defeat
- Dominican Republic 0–12 Suriname (Antigua, Antigua and Barbuda; 19 January, 2002)

CONCACAF Women's U-20 Championship
- Appearances: 4 (first in 2002)
- Best result: Semi-finals (2020)

FIFA U-20 Women's World Cup
- Appearances: 0

The Dominican Republic women's national under-20 football team is the association football women's team that represents the Dominican Republic at the under-20 level. The team competes in the CONCACAF Women's U-20 Championship and FIFA U-20 Women's World Cup.

== Current players ==
The following squad were selected for recently ended 2022 CONCACAF Women's U-20 Championship

No.	Pos.	Player	Date of birth (age)	Club
1	GK	Odaliana Gómez	16 June 2004 (aged 17)	(United States Soccer Federation) Matchfit FC
12	GK	Paloma Peña	20 February 2005 (aged 17)	(United States Soccer Federation) FC Prime
2	DF	Isabella Ventura	14 November 2006 (aged 15)	(United States Soccer Federation) FC Prime
3	DF	Nadia Colón	8 September 2002 (aged 19)	(United States Soccer Federation) University of Texas Rio Grande Valley
4	DF	Gabriella Marte	27 January 2003 (aged 19)	(United States Soccer Federation) Penn Fusion Soccer Academy
5	DF	Karla Muñiz	14 January 2002 (aged 20)	(United States Soccer Federation) Santa Fe FC
14	DF	Paola Then	15 April 2004 (aged 17)	(United States Soccer Federation) Santa Fe FC
17	DF	Alexa Pacheco	6 November 2002 (aged 19)	(United States Soccer Federation) Goldey–Beacom College
6	MF	Keisla Gil	12 July 2003 (aged 18)	(Dominican Football Federation) 5 de Abril
13	MF	Janine Díaz	6 July 2004 (aged 17)	(Dominican Football Federation) Cibao FC
15	MF	Jazmín Herrera	14 July 2005 (aged 16)	(United States Soccer Federation) FC Prime
16	MF	María Torreira	2 March 2006 (aged 15)	(United States Soccer Federation) Santa Fe FC
18	MF	Emely Pichardo	10 April 2004 (aged 17)	(United States Soccer Federation) Barton College
19	MF	Stephanie Espinal	9 January 2004 (aged 18)	(Dominican Football Federation) Cibao FC
7	FW	Angelina Vargas	6 July 2005 (aged 16)	(United States Soccer Federation) Players Development Academy
8	FW	Jazlyn Oviedo (c)	25 March 2002 (aged 19)	(United States Soccer Federation) Monmouth University
9	FW	Ariana Díaz	6 April 2005 (aged 16)	(United States Soccer Federation) East Meadow Soccer Club
10	FW	Jendy Matos	16 January 2003 (aged 19)	(Dominican Football Federation) Bob Soccer School FC
11	FW	Liliane Clase	29 July 2003 (aged 18)	(United States Soccer Federation) Angelina College
20	FW	Camila Morel	21 November 2002 (aged 19)	(Dominican Football Federation) Bob Soccer School FC

== Fixtures and results ==
Legend

Win Draw Loss Fixtures

== Competitive records ==
=== FIFA U-20 Women's World Cup ===
FIFA U-20 Women's World Cup record
Year	Round	Position	MP	W	D*	L	GF	GA
(Canada) 2002 to (Colombia) 2024	Did not qualify							
(Poland) 2026	To be determined							
Total	–	0/12	0	0	0	0	0	0

=== CONCACAF Women's U-20 Championship ===
CONCACAF Women's U-20 Championship record
Year	Result	Matches	Wins	Draws	Losses	GF	GA
(Trinidad and Tobago) 2002	Did not qualify						
(Canada) 2004	Group stage	3	0	0	3	1	27
(Mexico) 2006 to (Trinidad and Tobago) 2018	Did not qualify						
(Dominican Republic) 2020	Semi-finals	6	3	1	2	13	6
(Dominican Republic) 2022	Round of 16	4	1	0	3	6	16
(Dominican Republic) 2023	Group stage	3	1	0	2	3	8
Total	4/12	16	6	1	9	25	49
