= Kedie Johnson =

Trinidad and Tobago footballer (born 2000)

Kédie Johnson
Personal information
- Date of birth: 19 November 2000 (age 25)
- Place of birth: Port of Spain, Trinidad and Tobago
- Height: 1.73 m (5 ft 8 in)
- Positions: Defender; midfielder

Team information
- Current team: Saint-Étienne
- Number: 20

College career
Years	Team	Apps	(Gls)
2018–2021	FIU Panthers		
2022	Louisiana–Monroe Warhawks		

Senior career*
Years	Team	Apps	(Gls)
2023–2025	Lille	25	(0)
2025–	Saint-Étienne	11	(0)

International career^{‡}
2018–	Trinidad and Tobago	23	(5)
- * Club domestic league appearances and goals as of 11:11, April 18, 2026 (UTC) ‡ National team caps and goals as of 4 March 2026

Kédie Johnson (born 19 November 2000) is a Trinidad and Tobago professional footballer who plays as a defender or midfielder for Saint-Étienne.

== Early life ==
Johnson was born in Port of Spain, Trinidad and Tobago. She has three brothers and three sisters. Growing up, she attended Florida International University in the United States. Following her stint there, she attended the University of Louisiana at Monroe in the United States.

== Club career ==
In 2023, Johnson signed for French side Lille, where she suffered relegation from the top flight to the second tier. Ahead of the 2025–26 season, she returned to the French top flight after signing for Saint-Étienne.

== International career ==
Johnson was only 11 when she made her debut for the Trinidad and Tobago Under-15 national team. In March 2018, Johnson made her senior debut with Trinidad and Tobago against Panama at 17 years old. She scored her first international goal against the U.S. Virgin Islands two months later. During the summer of 2022, she was part of the national team's squad competing in the 2022 CONCACAF W Championship.

=== International goals ===
Scores and results list Trinidad and Tobago goal tally first.

No.	Date	Venue	Opponent	Score	Result	Competition
1	19 May 2018	Ato Boldon Stadium, Couva, Trinidad and Tobago	U.S. Virgin Islands	7–0	10–0	2018 CONCACAF Women's Championship qualification
2	27 May 2018	Ato Boldon Stadium, Couva, Trinidad and Tobago	Grenada	1–0	13–0	2018 CONCACAF Women's Championship qualification
3	31 May 2024	Stadion Rignaal 'Jean' Francisca, Willemstad, Curaçao	Curaçao	3–1	3–1	Caribbean Queen’s Friendly Tournament 2024
4	1 December 2025	Kensington Oval, Bridgetown, Barbados	Barbados	2–0	5–0	2026 CONCACAF W Championship qualification
5	4 March 2026	Chelato Uclés National Stadium, Tegucigalpa, Honduras	Honduras	2–1	2–2	2026 CONCACAF W Championship qualification

== Style of play ==
Johnson plays as a defender or midfielder. Trinidad and Tobago newspaper Trinidad and Tobago Guardian wrote in 2025 that "she plays a tidy defender on the left side of the defence but fancies going up in attack".
