= 2026 CONCACAF W Championship qualification =

North American association football competition

2026 CONCACAF W Championship Qualifiers
Tournament details
- Dates: 27 November 2025 – 18 April 2026
- Teams: 29 (from 1 confederation)

Tournament statistics
- Matches played: 56
- Goals scored: 314 (5.61 per match)
- Top scorer(s): (Mexico) Charlyn Corral (13 goals)

The 2026 CONCACAF W Championship qualification, officially called 2025/26 Concacaf W Qualifiers, was a women's football competition that determined the six teams joining the two teams which would automatically qualify for the 2026 CONCACAF W Championship final tournament in November 2026.

== Teams ==
A total of 39 CONCACAF member associations were eligible to enter the qualifying competition, with Canada and the United States having qualified automatically for the final tournament as the top two teams from CONCACAF in FIFA Women's World Ranking of 7 August 2025. After the withdrawal of Turks and Caicos Islands prior to the draw, a total of 29 teams entered the preliminary phase.

Automatic qualifiers

- **Canada**
- **United States**

Teams entering qualification (Note: Teams in bold qualified for the final tournament.)

- Anguilla (Note: Not a member of the IOC, therefore ineligible for the Olympics)
- Antigua and Barbuda
- Aruba
- Barbados
- Belize
- Bermuda
- Cayman Islands
- **Costa Rica**
- Cuba
- Curaçao
- Dominica
- Dominican Republic
- **El Salvador**
- Grenada
- Guatemala
- Guyana
- **Haiti**
- Honduras
- **Jamaica**
- **Mexico**
- Nicaragua
- **Panama**
- Puerto Rico
- Saint Kitts and Nevis
- Saint Lucia
- Saint Vincent and the Grenadines
- Suriname
- Trinidad and Tobago
- U.S. Virgin Islands

Did not enter

- Bahamas
- Bonaire (Note: Not a member of FIFA, therefore ineligible for the 2027 FIFA Women's World Cup)
- British Virgin Islands
- French Guiana
- Guadeloupe
- Martinique
- Montserrat
- Saint Martin
- Sint Maarten
- Turks and Caicos Islands

== Format ==
The two highest-ranked teams from CONCACAF in the FIFA Women's World Ranking of August 2025 (the United States and Canada) received a bye to the final tournament. 29 teams entering qualification were drawn into six groups to play a single-leg round-robin tournament during the international windows of November–December 2025, and February–March and April 2026. The winners of each group qualified for the final tournament in November 2026.

=== Tiebreakers ===
Teams were ranked based on the following criteria:

1. Standings points (three points for a win, one point for a draw, and no points for a loss)
2. Goal differential in all group matches
3. Goals scored in all group matches
  If two or more teams were still tied, then the following criteria were applied:
4. Standings points obtained in matches among the tied teams
5. Goal differential in matches among the tied teams (only applied if more than two teams were tied)
6. Goals scored in matches among the tied teams (only applied if more than two teams were tied)
7. Goals scored away from home in matches between the tied teams (only applied if two teams were tied)
8. Lowest disciplinary score in all group matches:
  - One point for a yellow card
  - Three points for an indirect red card (second yellow card in the match)
  - Four points for a direct red card
  - Five points for a yellow card and a direct red card
9. Drawing of lots by CONCACAF

== Draw ==
The draw took place on 20 August 2025, 19:00 EDT, in Miami, United States. The teams taking part in qualifying were seeded based on the FIFA Women's World Ranking of August 2025 (listed before each team). (Note: CONCACAF announced the pot allocation on 7 August 2025 based on the CONCACAF women's ranking published on 11 March 2025. On 14 August, the teams were re-allocated according to the FIFA Women's World Ranking published on 7 August 2025.) The top six teams in the ranking were pre-seeded and automatically allocated to position 1 in order from groups A to F. The remaining teams were placed into Pots 1 to 4 based on ranking, with each pot containing six teams. Turks and Caicos Islands were originally allocated to Pot 4, but withdrew prior to the draw thus leaving Pot 4 with only five teams.

Pre-seeded	Pot 1	Pot 2	Pot 3	Pot 4
29. Mexico (29) (A1); 40. Jamaica (B1); 43. Costa Rica (C1); 49. Haiti (D1); 57. Panama (E1); 75. Trinidad and Tobago (F1)	77. Puerto Rico; 84. Guatemala; 87. El Salvador; 90. Guyana; 94. Cuba; 99. Dominican Republic	112. Nicaragua; 127. Honduras; 135. Suriname; 137. Saint Kitts and Nevis; 143. Bermuda; 156. Saint Lucia	159. Barbados; 162. Saint Vincent and the Grenadines; 167. Dominica; 171. Belize; 172. Grenada; 179. Curaçao	180. Antigua and Barbuda; 181. Cayman Islands; 184. U.S. Virgin Islands; 186. Aruba; 191. Anguilla

=== Draw result ===
The draw resulted in the following groups:

Group A
Pos	Team
A1	Mexico
A2	Puerto Rico
A3	Saint Lucia
A4	Saint Vincent and the Grenadines
A5	U.S. Virgin Islands

Group D
Pos	Team
D1	Haiti
D2	Dominican Republic
D3	Suriname
D4	Belize
D5	Anguilla

Group B
Pos	Team
B1	Jamaica
B2	Guyana
B3	Nicaragua
B4	Dominica
B5	Antigua and Barbuda

Group E
Pos	Team
E1	Panama
E2	Cuba
E3	Saint Kitts and Nevis
E4	Curaçao
E5	Aruba

Group C
Pos	Team
C1	Costa Rica
C2	Guatemala
C3	Bermuda
C4	Grenada
C5	Cayman Islands

Group F
Pos	Team
F1	Trinidad and Tobago
F2	El Salvador
F3	Honduras
F4	Barbados

== Groups ==
=== Group A ===
Pos	Team	Pld	W	D	L	GF	GA	GD	Pts	Qualification	(Mexico)	(Puerto Rico)	(Saint Vincent and the Grenadines)	(United States Virgin Islands)	(Saint Lucia)
1	Mexico	4	4	0	0	36	0	+36	12	2026 CONCACAF W Championship	—	6–0	—	9–0	—
2	Puerto Rico	4	3	0	1	26	6	+20	9		—	—	10–0	—	7–0
3	Saint Vincent and the Grenadines	4	2	0	2	2	24	−22	6		0–14	—	—	1–0	—
4	U.S. Virgin Islands	4	1	0	3	3	20	−17	3		—	0–9	—	—	3–1
5	Saint Lucia	4	0	0	4	1	18	−17	0		0–7	—	0–1	—	—

Source: CONCACAF
Rules for classification: Tiebreakers
27 November 2025
16:00 UTC−4

U.S. Virgin Islands	3–1	Saint Lucia
Vialva 10'; Frost 32'; Hood 49'	Report (FIFA); Report (CONCACAF)	St. Louis 44'

Bethlehem Soccer Complex, Kingshill
Referee: Carly Shaw-MacLaren (Canada)

29 November 2025
19:00 UTC−4

Saint Vincent and the Grenadines	0–14	Mexico
	Report (FIFA); Report (CONCACAF)	Corral 6', 22', 45', 61', 86', 90', 90+3'; Ovalle 14', 57', 65'; Camberos 25'; Soto 55'; Saldívar 73'; Sánchez 75'

Arnos Vale Stadium, Kingstown
Referee: Merlin Soto (Honduras)

1 December 2025
19:30 UTC−4

Puerto Rico	7–0	Saint Lucia
Aguilera 4', 39', 74', 78'; Marcano 12'; De Jesus 18'; C. Torres 64'	Report (FIFA); Report (CONCACAF)

Estadio Juan Ramón Loubriel, Bayamón
Referee: Odette Hamilton (Jamaica)

27 February 2026
20:00 UTC−4

Puerto Rico	10–0	Saint Vincent and the Grenadines
Marcano 11', 42'; Aguilera 21', 74' (pen.), 77'; Love 23', 34'; Em. González 27'; Gillespie 45'; Nieves-Melchor 50'	Report (FIFA); Report (CONCACAF)

Estadio Juan Ramón Loubriel, Bayamón
Referee: Saphire Stockman (Costa Rica)

2 March 2026
15:00 UTC−4

Saint Lucia	0–7	Mexico
	Report (FIFA); Report (CONCACAF)	Bernal 18'; Corral 26', 64'; Marquis 52' (o.g.); Delgado 70'; Hernández 87'; Ordóñez 90+5'

Daren Sammy Cricket Ground, Gros Islet
Referee: Cecile Hinds (Trinidad and Tobago)

5 March 2026
15:30 UTC−4

U.S. Virgin Islands	0–9	Puerto Rico
	Report (FIFA); Report (CONCACAF)	Aguilera 35', 82'; Marcano 38' (pen.), 45+5'; Tapia 41'; Es. González 45', 90+1'; C. Torres 55'; García 90+3'

Bethlehem Soccer Stadium, St. Croix
Referee: Minely Ureña (Dominican Republic)

10 April 2026
19ː00 UTC−6

Mexico	9–0	U.S. Virgin Islands
Sánchez 5', 19', 32', 45+5'; Corral 9', 25' (pen.); Rodríguez 29'; Camberos 39'; Palacios 82'	Report (FIFA); Report (CONCACAF)

Estadio Carlos Vega Villalba, Zacatecas
Referee: Deily Gómez (Costa Rica)

14 April 2026
17ː00 UTC−4

Saint Vincent and the Grenadines	1–0	U.S. Virgin Islands
Laborde 90+1'	Report (FIFA); Report (CONCACAF)

Arnos Vale Stadium, Kingstown
Referee: Glenda López (Guatemala)

18 April 2026
15ː00 UTC−4

Saint Lucia	0–1	Saint Vincent and the Grenadines
	Report (FIFA); Report (CONCACAF)	Iton 14'

Daren Sammy Cricket Ground, Gros Islet
Referee: Shandor Wilkinson (Saint Kitts and Nevis)

18 April 2026
18ː00 UTC−6

Mexico	6–0	Puerto Rico
Delgado 11'; Es. González 32' (o.g.); Camberos 39'; Palacios 59'; Corral 63', 86'	Report (FIFA); Report (CONCACAF)

Estadio Nemesio Díez, Toluca
Referee: Natalie Simon (United States)

=== Group B ===
Pos	Team	Pld	W	D	L	GF	GA	GD	Pts	Qualification	(Jamaica)	(Nicaragua)	(Guyana)	(Antigua and Barbuda)	(Dominica)
1	Jamaica	4	4	0	0	27	2	+25	12	2026 CONCACAF W Championship	—	—	2–0	4–0	—
2	Nicaragua	4	3	0	1	23	4	+19	9		2–3	—	—	—	14–0
3	Guyana	4	2	0	2	8	5	+3	6		—	1–3	—	—	3–0
4	Antigua and Barbuda	4	0	1	3	1	13	−12	1		—	0–4	0–4	—	—
5	Dominica	4	0	1	3	1	36	−35	1		0–18	—	—	1–1	—

Source: CONCACAF
Rules for classification: Tiebreakers
27 November 2025
16:00 UTC−4

Antigua and Barbuda	0–4	Nicaragua
	Report (FIFA); Report (CONCACAF)	Silva 10'; Flores 19'; Aguilar 31'; Lee 85'

Sir Vivian Richards Stadium, St. John’s
Referee: Francia González (Mexico)

29 November 2025
15:00 UTC−4

Dominica	0–18	Jamaica
	Report (FIFA); Report (CONCACAF)	Plummer 2'; Shaw 4', 39', 43'; van Zanten 7', 21'; Brown 9', 35', 82'; Primus 11'; Paul 26' (o.g.); Blackwood 51', 89'; Buckley 80', 90+2'; Thomas 86', 88'; Hayles 90+1'

Daren Sammy Cricket Ground, Gros Islet (Saint Lucia)
Referee: Astrid Azucena Gramajo Ramirez (Guatemala)

1 December 2025
20:00 UTC−4

Guyana	1–3	Nicaragua
Vincent 18'	Report (FIFA); Report (CONCACAF)	Flores 3'; Márquez 35'; Aguilar 49'

Leonora National Track & Field Center, West Coast Demerara
Referee: Diana Pérez (Mexico)

27 February 2026
20:00 UTC−4

Guyana	3–0	Dominica
Charles 8'; Ritchie 75'; Johnson 77'	Report (FIFA); Report (CONCACAF)

Leonora National Track & Field Center, West Coast Demerara
Referee: Miriam Leon Serpas (El Salvador)

2 March 2026
18:00 UTC−6

Nicaragua	2–3	Jamaica
S. Flores 27' (pen.); Márquez 82'	Report (FIFA); Report (CONCACAF)	Shaw 37', 58'; Hayles 68'

Estadio Nacional, Managua
Referee: Sandra Benítez (El Salvador)

5 March 2026
17:00 UTC−4

Antigua and Barbuda	0–4	Guyana
	Report (FIFA); Report (CONCACAF)	Hughes 15' (o.g.); Desa 55'; Vincent 67' (pen.), 77'

Sir Vivian Richards Stadium, St. John’s
Referee: Janeishka Caban (Puerto Rico)

10 April 2026
19ː00 UTC−5

Jamaica	4–0	Antigua and Barbuda
Shaw 45+1' (pen.), 49', 55'; Blackwood 90+1' (pen.)	Report (FIFA); Report (CONCACAF)

National Stadium, Kingston
Attendance: Francia González (Mexico)

14 April 2026
15ː00 UTC−4

Dominica	1–1	Antigua and Barbuda
Esprit 63'	Report (FIFA); Report (CONCACAF)	Jacobs 87' (pen.)

Daren Sammy Cricket Ground, Gros Islet (Saint Lucia)
Referee: Cecile Hinds (Trinidad and Tobago Football Association)

18 April 2026
19ː00 UTC−5

Jamaica	2–0	Guyana
Shaw 8'; Hayles 88'	Report (FIFA); Report (CONCACAF)

National Stadium, Kingston
Referee: Vimarest Diaz (Dominican Republic)

18 April 2026
18ː00 UTC−6

Nicaragua	14–0	Dominica
Márquez 2', 37'; I. Navarrete 24', 43'; Lee 27'; S. Flores 28'; Y. Flores 55' (pen.), 74', 90', 90+11'; Humphreys 64' (o.g.); Mejía 79'; Picado 90+2'; Centeno 90+13' (pen.)	Report (FIFA); Report (CONCACAF)

Estadio Nacional, Managua
Referee: Kedeen Foster (Cayman Islands)

=== Group C ===
Pos	Team	Pld	W	D	L	GF	GA	GD	Pts	Qualification	(Costa Rica)	(Guatemala)	(Bermuda)	(Grenada)	(Cayman Islands)
1	Costa Rica	4	4	0	0	34	1	+33	12	2026 CONCACAF W Championship	—	3–0	—	—	21–0
2	Guatemala	4	3	0	1	23	4	+19	9		—	—	4–1	6–0	—
3	Bermuda	4	2	0	2	10	15	−5	6		0–8	—	—	5–3	—
4	Grenada	4	1	0	3	7	14	−7	3		1–2	—	—	—	3–1
5	Cayman Islands	4	0	0	4	1	41	−40	0		—	0–13	0–4	—	—

Source: CONCACAF
Rules for classification: Tiebreakers
27 November 2025
19:00 UTC−5

Cayman Islands	0–4	Bermuda
	Report (FIFA); Report (CONCACAF)	Frazzoni 2'; Thompson 13'; Masters 40'; Christopher 68'

Truman Bodden Sports Complex, George Town
Referee: Crystal Sobers (Trinidad and Tobago)

29 November 2025
19:30 UTC−4

Grenada	1–2	Costa Rica
Bedeau 32'	Report (FIFA); Report (CONCACAF)	Chinchilla 45+2', 61'

Kirani James Athletic Stadium, St. George’s
Referee: Janeishka Caban (Puerto Rico)

1 December 2025
19:00 UTC−6

Guatemala	4–1	Bermuda
Monterroso 5', 61'; Polanco 15'; Martínez 77' (pen.)	Report (FIFA); Report (CONCACAF)	Frazzoni 78'

Estadio Cementos Progreso, Guatemala City
Referee: Minely Ureña (Dominican Republic)

28 February 2026
19:00 UTC−6

Guatemala	6–0	Grenada
S. López 7'; Polanco 24'; Álvarez 30'; Martínez 45+2'; Estrada 47'; Solórzano 50'	Report (FIFA); Report (CONCACAF)

Estadio Manuel Felipe Carrera, Guatemala City
Referee: Belkis Flores (Honduras)

3 March 2026
19:00 UTC−4

Bermuda	0–8	Costa Rica
	Report (FIFA); Report (CONCACAF)	Villalobos 5'; Scott 8', 75' (pen.); Chinchilla 16', 87'; Masters 30' (o.g.); Alvarado 39'; Blanco 70'

Dame Flora Duffy National Sports Centre, Devonshire Parish
Referee: Alex Billiter (United States)

6 March 2026
19:00 UTC−5

Cayman Islands	0–13	Guatemala
	Report (FIFA); Report (CONCACAF)	Solórzano 1', 10', 19', 61'; Álvarez 4', 7', 76'; Martínez 5', 21', 37'; Mondi 69', 72', 90+2'

Truman Bodden Sports Complex, George Town
Referee: Erika Monserrat González Nevarez (Mexico)

10 April 2026
18ː00 UTC−6

Costa Rica	21–0	Cayman Islands
Del Campo 10', 90+2'; Chinchilla 11', 38', 40', 53', 60', 79', 90'; Benavides 13', 33'; R. Rodríguez 19', 24', 49'; Scott 22', 47'; Salas 46', 63', 75'; M. Herrera 51'; P. Rodríguez 82'	Report (FIFA); Report (CONCACAF)

Estadio Alejandro Morera Soto, Alajuela
Referee: Merlin Soto (Honduras)

14 April 2026
17ː00 UTC−4

Grenada	3–1	Cayman Islands
Mitchell 45+5'; Fleming-Thompson 62'; Hypolite 88'	Report (FIFA); Report (CONCACAF)	Kehoe 4'

Kirani James Athletic Stadium, St. George’s
Referee: Nathalya Williams (Trinidad and Tobago)

18 April 2026
19ː00 UTC−4

Bermuda	5–3	Grenada
Dill 38', 45+3', 56', 90'; Thompson 82'	Report (FIFA); Report (CONCACAF)	Fullerton 4'; Charles 17'; Fleming-Thompson 25'

Dame Flora Duffy National Sports Centre, Devonshire Parish
Referee: Priscila Perez (Mexico)

18 April 2026
18ː00 UTC−6

Costa Rica	3–0	Guatemala
Villalobos 13'; Scott 63'; Chinchilla 88'	Report (FIFA); Report (CONCACAF)

Estadio Nacional, San José
Referee: Katja Koroleva (United States)

=== Group D ===
Pos	Team	Pld	W	D	L	GF	GA	GD	Pts	Qualification	(Haiti)	(Dominican Republic)	(Belize)	(Suriname)	(Anguilla)
1	Haiti	4	3	1	0	17	1	+16	10	2026 CONCACAF W Championship	—	1–1	—	—	5–0
2	Dominican Republic	4	2	2	0	17	4	+13	8		—	—	6–1	2–2	—
3	Belize	4	2	0	2	5	15	−10	6		0–9	—	—	—	2–0
4	Suriname	4	1	1	2	5	7	−2	4		0–2	—	0–2	—	—
5	Anguilla	4	0	0	4	1	18	−17	0		—	0–8	—	1–3	—

Source: CONCACAF
Rules for classification: Tiebreakers
28 November 2025
15:30 UTC−4

Anguilla	1–3	Suriname
Ca. Johnson 90+1'	Report (FIFA); Report (CONCACAF)	Pereira 7'; van Netten 45', 75'

Raymond E. Guishard Technical Centre, The Valley
Referee: Marianela Araya (Costa Rica)

30 November 2025
19:00 UTC−6

Belize	0–9	Haiti
	Report (FIFA); Report (CONCACAF)	Mondésir 12', 18', 32', 63'; Louis 13', 50'; Éloissaint 43'; Dumornay 78' (pen.), 87'

FFB Stadium, Belmopan
Referee: Karen Hernández Andrade (Mexico)

2 December 2025
19:00 UTC−4

Dominican Republic	2–2	Suriname
Asenjo 16', 85'	Report (FIFA); Report (CONCACAF)	Hoekstra 3'; Dompig 5'

Estadio Complejo Deportivo Moca 85, Moca
Referee: Lizzet García (Mexico)

28 February 2026
19:00 UTC−4

Dominican Republic	6–1	Belize
Reed 16'; Asenjo 18', 48'; Cuevas 23'; A. Oviedo 59'; Peralta 84'	Report (FIFA); Report (CONCACAF)	Velasquez 45+2'

Estadio Cibao, Santiago
Referee: Isabel Barillas (El Salvador)

3 March 2026
19:00 UTC−3

Suriname	0–2	Haiti
	Report (FIFA); Report (CONCACAF)	Éloissaint 68'; Dumornay 89' (pen.)

Dr. Ir. Franklin Essed Stadion, Paramaribo
Referee: Kenisha Prescott (Guyana)

6 March 2026
15:00 UTC−4

Anguilla	0–8	Dominican Republic
	Report (FIFA); Report (CONCACAF)	Jackson 5'; A. Oviedo 22', 37', 38'; Asenjo 42'; Colón 48'; Cuevas 61'; González 90+1'

Raymond E. Guishard Technical Centre, The Valley
Referee: Kedeen Foster (Cayman Islands)

9 April 2026
20ː00 UTC−4

Haiti	5–0	Anguilla
Joseph 15', 60'; Domond 21'; Jeudy 33'; Constant 79'	Report (FIFA); Report (CONCACAF)

Stade Roger Zami, Le Gosier (Guadeloupe)
Referee: Crystal Sobers (Trinidad and Tobago)

13 April 2026
19ː00 UTC−6

Belize	2–0	Anguilla
Bowden 28'; Eiley 33'	Report (FIFA); Report (CONCACAF)

FFB Stadium, Belmopan
Referee: Paula Amaya Murillo (El Salvador)

17 April 2026
18ː00 UTC−3

Suriname	0–2	Belize
	Report (FIFA); Report (CONCACAF)	Bowden 70' (pen.); Terry 76'

Dr. Ir. Franklin Essed Stadion, Paramaribo
Referee: Karim Ariadne Molina Morán (Panama)

17 April 2026
20ː00 UTC−4

Haiti	1–1	Dominican Republic
Jeudy 67'	Report (FIFA); Report (CONCACAF)	Tapia 73'

Stade Roger Zami, Le Gosier (Guadeloupe)
Referee: Lizzet García (Mexico)

=== Group E ===
Pos	Team	Pld	W	D	L	GF	GA	GD	Pts	Qualification	(Panama)	(Cuba)	(Aruba)	(Curaçao)	(Saint Kitts and Nevis)
1	Panama	4	4	0	0	15	2	+13	12	2026 CONCACAF W Championship	—	3–0	3–1	—	—
2	Cuba	4	2	1	1	6	5	+1	7		—	—	—	3–0	2–2
3	Aruba	4	2	0	2	9	6	+3	6		—	0–1	—	—	2–1
4	Curaçao	4	1	0	3	4	16	−12	3		1–6	—	1–6	—	—
5	Saint Kitts and Nevis	4	0	1	3	4	9	−5	1		0–3	—	—	1–2	—

Source: CONCACAF
Rules for classification: Tiebreakers
28 November 2025
20:00 UTC−4

Aruba	2–1	Saint Kitts and Nevis
Doornkamp 43'; Hazel 62'	Report (FIFA); Report (CONCACAF)	Browne 36'

Trinidad Stadium, Oranjestad
Referee: Deily Gómez (Costa Rica)

30 November 2025
20:00 UTC−4

Curaçao	1–6	Panama
Martina 71'	Report (FIFA); Report (CONCACAF)	Riley 4'; Parris 50'; E. Arauz 66', 73'; Jaén 79'; Tanner 90+2'

Stadion Rignaal 'Jean' Francisca, Willemstad
Referee: Marie-Soleil Beaudoin (Canada)

2 December 2025
15:00 UTC−5

Cuba	2–2	Saint Kitts and Nevis
Aldana 53', 71' (pen.)	Report (FIFA); Report (CONCACAF)	Browne 15'; Wanton 75' (o.g.)

Estadio Antonio Maceo, Santiago de Cuba
Referee: Glenda López (Guatemala)

1 March 2026
15:00 UTC−5

Cuba	3–0	Curaçao
K. Rodríguez 42' (pen.), 59' (pen.), 90' (pen.)	Report (FIFA); Report (CONCACAF)

Estadio Antonio Maceo, Santiago de Cuba
Referee: Marjorie Ponce Lopez (Nicaragua)

4 March 2026
19:00 UTC−4

Saint Kitts and Nevis	0–3	Panama
	Report (FIFA); Report (CONCACAF)	Espinosa 53'; Tanner 56'; Castillo 90+3'

SKNFA Technical Center, St. Peter's
Referee: Génesis de León (Guatemala)

7 March 2026
20:00 UTC−4

Aruba	0–1	Cuba
	Report (FIFA); Report (CONCACAF)	Aguilar 62'

Trinidad Stadium, Oranjestad
Referee: Ximena Márquez Ruíz (Mexico)

9 April 2026
19ː00 UTC−5

Panama	3–1	Aruba
Tanner 16'; Hernández 29'; Riley 73'	Report (FIFA); Report (CONCACAF)	Susanna 5'

Estadio Universidad Latina, Penonomé
Referee: Sandra Benítez (El Salvador)

13 April 2026
20ː00 UTC−4

Curaçao	1–6	Aruba
Burnet 52'	Report (FIFA); Report (CONCACAF)	Doornkamp 7', 54' (pen.); Verhoeve 43'; Gumbs 67'; Breinburg 80'; Henao 90+4'

Stadion Rignaal 'Jean' Francisca, Willemstad
Referee: Danielle Chesky (United States)

17 April 2026
19ː00 UTC−4

Saint Kitts and Nevis	1–2	Curaçao
Blake 1'	Report (FIFA); Report (CONCACAF)	Martina 58'; Burnet 90+1'

SKNFA Technical Center, St. Peter's
Referee: Alex Billeter (United States)

17 April 2026
19ː00 UTC−5

Panama	3–0	Cuba
Arauz 2', 57'; Wanton 22' (o.g.)	Report (FIFA); Report (CONCACAF)

Estadio Universidad Latina, Penonomé
Referee: Alyssa Pennington (United States)

=== Group F ===
Pos	Team	Pld	W	D	L	GF	GA	GD	Pts	Qualification	(El Salvador)	(Trinidad and Tobago)	(Honduras)	(Barbados)
1	El Salvador	3	3	0	0	18	0	+18	9	2026 CONCACAF W Championship	—	—	3–0	13–0
2	Trinidad and Tobago	3	1	1	1	7	4	+3	4		0–2	—	—	—
3	Honduras	3	1	1	1	6	5	+1	4		—	2–2	—	4–0
4	Barbados	3	0	0	3	0	22	−22	0		—	0–5	—	—

Source: CONCACAF
Rules for classification: Tiebreakers
1 December 2025
18:00 UTC−4

Barbados	0–5	Trinidad and Tobago
	Report (FIFA); Report (CONCACAF)	Cordner 12'; Johnson 77'; Borneo 82'; A. Prince 83'; Romain 90+5'

BFA Technical Centre, Bridgetown
Referee: Alyssa Pennington (United States)

2 December 2025
19:30 UTC−6

El Salvador	3–0	Honduras
D. Fuentes 3'; López 48'; Meza 90+6'	Report (FIFA); Report (CONCACAF)

Estadio Jorge "El Mágico" González, San Salvador
Referee: Natalie Simon (United States)

1 March 2026
17:30 UTC−6

El Salvador	13–0	Barbados
D. Fuentes 8', 34', 87'; Gutiérrez 17', 60'; Meza 31'; Cerén 35', 38', 72'; Gómez 53'; Dybala 64'; Velásquez 79', 90+4'	Report (FIFA); Report (CONCACAF)

Estadio Las Delicias, San Salvador
Attendance: 4,811
Referee: Vimarest Diaz (Dominican Republic)

4 March 2026
19:00 UTC−6

Honduras	2–2	Trinidad and Tobago
Reed 9', 21'	Report (FIFA); Report (CONCACAF)	Johnson 41' (pen.); Gosine 87' (pen.)

Estadio Nacional Chelato Uclés, Tegucigalpa
Referee: Myriam Marcotte (Canada)

17 April 2026
18ː00 UTC−4

Trinidad and Tobago	0–2	El Salvador
	Report (FIFA); Report (CONCACAF)	Cerén 37', 51'

Hasely Crawford Stadium, Port of Spain
Referee: Marianela Araya (Costa Rica)

17 April 2026
19ː00 UTC−6

Honduras	4–0	Barbados
Reed 2'; Merriam 60'; Murillo 70' (pen.); Sánchez 85'	Report (FIFA); Report (CONCACAF)

Estadio Nacional Chelato Uclés, Tegucigalpa
Referee: Astrid Gramajo (Guatemala)

== Goalscorers ==
There were 314 goals scored in 56 matches, for an average of 5.61 goals per match.

13 goals

- (Mexico women's national football team) Charlyn Corral

12 goals

- (Costa Rica women's national football team) Priscila Chinchilla

9 goals

- (Jamaica women's national football team) Khadija Shaw
- (Puerto Rico women's national football team) Jill Aguilera

5 goals

- (Costa Rica women's national football team) Sheika Scott
- (Dominican Republic women's national football team) Mía Asenjo
- (El Salvador women's national football team) Brenda Cerén
- (Guatemala women's national football team) Ana Lucía Martínez
- (Guatemala women's national football team) Aisha Solórzano
- (Mexico women's national football team) María Sánchez
- (Puerto Rico women's national football team) Danielle Marcano

4 goals

- (Bermuda women's national football team) Keunna Dill
- (Dominican Republic women's national football team) Alyssa Oviedo
- (El Salvador women's national football team) Danielle Fuentes
- (Guatemala women's national football team) Andrea Álvarez
- (Haiti women's national football team) Nérilia Mondésir
- (Nicaragua women's national football team) Sheyla Flores
- (Nicaragua women's national football team) Mayqueling Márquez
- (Panama women's national football team) Ericka Araúz

3 goals

- (Aruba women's national football team) Tarianna Doornkamp
- (Costa Rica women's national football team) María Paula Salas
- (Costa Rica women's national football team) Rocky Rodríguez
- (Cuba women's national football team) Katheryn Rodríguez
- (Guatemala women's national football team) Hannah Mondi
- (Guyana women's national football team) Annalisa Vincent
- (Haiti women's national football team) Melchie Dumornay
- (Honduras women's national football team) Allyson Reed
- (Jamaica women's national football team) Deneisha Blackwood
- (Jamaica women's national football team) Jody Brown
- (Jamaica women's national football team) Shania Hayles
- (Mexico women's national football team) Scarlett Camberos
- (Mexico women's national football team) Lizbeth Ovalle
- (Panama women's national football team) Riley Tanner

2 goals

- (Belize women's national football team) Mikhaila Bowden
- (Bermuda women's national football team) Eva Frazzoni
- (Bermuda women's national football team) Kenni Thompson
- (Costa Rica women's national football team) Mariana Benavides
- (Costa Rica women's national football team) Valeria del Campo
- (Cuba women's national football team) Cecil Aldana
- (Curaçao women's national football team) Amazia Burnet
- (Curaçao women's national football team) Shi-jona Martina
- (Dominican Republic women's national football team) Gabriella Cuevas
- (El Salvador women's national football team) Dany Gutiérrez
- (El Salvador women's national football team) Victoria Meza
- (El Salvador women's national football team) Jackeline Velásquez
- (Grenada women's national football team) Nia Fleming-Thompson
- (Guatemala women's national football team) María Monterroso
- (Guatemala women's national football team) Dina Polanco
- (Haiti women's national football team) Roseline Éloissaint
- (Haiti women's national football team) Sherly Jeudy
- (Haiti women's national football team) Darlina Joseph
- (Haiti women's national football team) Batcheba Louis
- (Jamaica women's national football team) Shaneil Buckley
- (Jamaica women's national football team) Natasha Thomas
- (Jamaica women's national football team) Kiki van Zanten
- (Mexico women's national football team) Alexia Delgado
- (Mexico women's national football team) Kiana Palacios
- (Nicaragua women's national football team) Doriana Aguilar
- (Nicaragua women's national football team) Hannah Lee
- (Nicaragua women's national football team) Inés Navarrete
- (Panama women's national football team) Karla Riley
- (Puerto Rico women's national football team) Estefanía González
- (Puerto Rico women's national football team) Juelle Love
- (Puerto Rico women's national football team) Cristina Torres
- (Saint Kitts and Nevis women's national football team) Phoenetia Browne
- (Suriname women's national football team) Rachel van Netten
- (Trinidad and Tobago women's national football team) Kedie Johnson

1 goal

- (Anguilla women's national football team) Carlia Johnson
- (Antigua and Barbuda women's national football team) Kai Jacobs
- (Aruba women's national football team) Adannayah Breinburg
- (Aruba women's national football team) Aisse Gumbs
- (Aruba women's national football team) Genesis Hazel
- (Aruba women's national football team) Jennifer Henao
- (Aruba women's national football team) Vanessa Susanna
- (Aruba women's national football team) Soraya Verhoeve
- (Belize women's national football team) Sabrina Eiley
- (Belize women's national football team) Alisha Terry
- (Belize women's national football team) Khaly Velasquez
- (Bermuda women's national football team) Nia Christopher
- (Bermuda women's national football team) Jaden Masters
- (Cayman Islands women's national football team) Molly Kehoe
- (Costa Rica women's national football team) Katherine Alvarado
- (Costa Rica women's national football team) Stephannie Blanco
- (Costa Rica women's national football team) Melissa Herrera
- (Costa Rica women's national football team) Priscilla Rodríguez
- (Costa Rica women's national football team) Fabiola Villalobos
- (Costa Rica women's national football team) Gloriana Villalobos
- (Cuba women's national football team) Nahomi Aguilar
- (Dominica women's national football team) Trinity Esprit
- (Dominican Republic women's national football team) Nadia Colón
- (Dominican Republic women's national football team) Kathrynn González
- (Dominican Republic women's national football team) Jazmín Jackson
- (Dominican Republic women's national football team) Winibian Peralta
- (Dominican Republic women's national football team) Brianne Reed
- (Dominican Republic women's national football team) Stella Tapia
- (El Salvador women's national football team) Jasmine Dybala
- (El Salvador women's national football team) Samaria Gómez
- (El Salvador women's national football team) Abigaíl López
- (Grenada women's national football team) Naomi Bedeau
- (Grenada women's national football team) Sheranda Charles
- (Grenada women's national football team) Mellania Fullerton
- (Grenada women's national football team) Alexis Hypolite
- (Grenada women's national football team) Raquelle Mitchell
- (Guatemala women's national football team) Elizabeth Estrada
- (Guatemala women's national football team) Samantha López
- (Guyana women's national football team) Otesha Charles
- (Guyana women's national football team) Brianne Desa
- (Guyana women's national football team) Sandra Johnson
- (Guyana women's national football team) Adelina Ritchie
- (Haiti women's national football team) Claire Constant
- (Haiti women's national football team) Chelsea Domond
- (Honduras women's national football team) Alexandra Merriam
- (Honduras women's national football team) Bárbara Murillo
- (Honduras women's national football team) Jazlyn Sánchez
- (Jamaica women's national football team) Konya Plummer
- (Jamaica women's national football team) Atlanta Primus
- (Mexico women's national football team) Rebeca Bernal
- (Mexico women's national football team) Nicolette Hernández
- (Mexico women's national football team) Diana Ordóñez
- (Mexico women's national football team) Kimberly Rodríguez
- (Mexico women's national football team) Montserrat Saldívar
- (Mexico women's national football team) Alice Soto
- (Nicaragua women's national football team) Tania Centeno
- (Nicaragua women's national football team) Yessenia Flores
- (Nicaragua women's national football team) Aryeri Mejía
- (Nicaragua women's national football team) Heydin Picado
- (Nicaragua women's national football team) Nathaly Silva
- (Panama women's national football team) Katherine Castillo
- (Panama women's national football team) Rebeca Espinosa
- (Panama women's national football team) Arlen Hernández
- (Panama women's national football team) Hilary Jaén
- (Panama women's national football team) Katherin Parris
- (Puerto Rico women's national football team) Jailene De Jesus
- (Puerto Rico women's national football team) Véronica García
- (Puerto Rico women's national football team) Gemma Gillespie
- (Puerto Rico women's national football team) Emma González
- (Puerto Rico women's national football team) Marilia Nieves-Melchor
- (Puerto Rico women's national football team) Maria Tapia
- (Saint Kitts and Nevis women's national football team) Sherema Blake
- (Saint Lucia women's national football team) Krysan St. Louis
- (Saint Vincent and the Grenadines women's national football team) Karesha Iton
- (Saint Vincent and the Grenadines women's national football team) Cherish Laborde
- (Suriname women's national football team) Chanté Dompig
- (Suriname women's national football team) Isabelle Hoekstra
- (Suriname women's national football team) Estelle Pereira
- (Trinidad and Tobago women's national football team) Ariana Borneo
- (Trinidad and Tobago women's national football team) Kennya Cordner
- (Trinidad and Tobago women's national football team) Nikita Gosine
- (Trinidad and Tobago women's national football team) Aaliyah Prince
- (Trinidad and Tobago women's national football team) Lorall Romain
- (United States Virgin Islands women's national soccer team) Lita Frost
- (United States Virgin Islands women's national soccer team) Reagan Hood
- (United States Virgin Islands women's national soccer team) Naya Vialva

1 own goal

- (Antigua and Barbuda women's national football team) Karmiellie Hughes (against Guyana)
- (Bermuda women's national football team) Jaden Masters (against Costa Rica)
- (Dominica women's national football team) Starr Humphreys (against Nicaragua)
- (Dominica women's national football team) Rosalinda Paul (against Jamaica)
- (Puerto Rico women's national football team) Estefanía González (against Puerto Rico)
- (Saint Lucia women's national football team) Ellaisa Marquis (against Mexico)

2 own goals

- (Cuba women's national football team) Sheyla Wanton (against Panama & Saint Kitts and Nevis)

== Awards ==
CONCACAF announced the following squad as the best eleven of qualifying after the conclusion of the campaign.

Best XI

Goalkeeper	Defenders	Midfielders	Forwards
(Guyana) Arden La-Rose	(Puerto Rico) Jill Aguilera (Panama) Katherine Castillo (Costa Rica) Mariana Benavides (Nicaragua) Sheyla Flores	(Haiti) Melchie Dumornay (Mexico) Alice Soto (El Salvador) Brenda Cerén	(Costa Rica) Priscila Chinchilla (Jamaica) Khadija Shaw (Mexico) Charlyn Corral

== Qualified teams ==
The following teams qualified for the final tournament, joining automatic qualifiers Canada and the United States.

Team	Qualified as	Qualified on	Previous appearances in CONCACAF W Championship (Note: Bold indicates champions for that year. Italic indicates hosts for that year.)
United States	Automatic qualifiers	7 August 2025	10 (**1991**, **1993**, **1994**, **2000**, **2002**, **2006**, 2010, **2014**, **2018**, **2022**)
Canada	Automatic qualifiers	7 August 2025	10 (1991, 1993, 1994, **1998**, 2000, 2002, 2006, **2010**, 2018, 2022)
El Salvador	Qualification Group F winner	17 April 2026	Debut
Haiti	Qualification Group D winner	17 April 2026	6 (1991, 1998, 2002, 2010, 2014, 2022)
Panama	Qualification Group E winner	17 April 2026	4 (2002, 2006, 2018, 2022)
Costa Rica	Qualification Group C winner	18 April 2026	8 (1991, 1998, 2000, 2002, 2010, 2014, 2018, 2022)
Jamaica	Qualification Group B winner	18 April 2026	7 (1991, 1994, 2002, 2006, 2014, 2018, 2022)
Mexico	Qualification Group A winner	18 April 2026	10 (1991, 1994, 1998, 2000, 2002, 2006, 2010, 2014, 2018, 2022)
