= Curaçao women's national football team =

Women's national association football team representing Curaçao

Curaçao
- Association: Curaçao Football Federation
- Confederation: CONCACAF
- Head coach: Johan van Heertum
- Captain: Kadisha Martina
- Most caps: Ignarda Pieternella (12)
- Top scorer: Kadisha Martina (8)
- Home stadium: Stadion Rignaal 'Jean' Francisca; Stadion Ergilio Hato
- FIFA code: CUW
First colours	Second colours

FIFA ranking
- Current: 180 ▲1 (16 June 2026)
- Highest: 128 (May 2006)
- Lowest: 180 (December 2025)

First international
- Cayman Islands 1–2 Netherlands Antilles (George Town, Cayman Islands; 18 March 2006) as modern Curaçao; Guadeloupe 2–3 Curaçao (North Sound, Antigua and Barbuda; 25 April 2018)

Biggest win
- Curaçao 6–1 Cayman Islands (Willemstad, Curaçao; 4 December 2023)

Biggest defeat
- Suriname 7–1 Netherlands Antilles (Oranjestad, Aruba; 3 May 2006) as modern Curaçao; Curaçao 0–6 Guatemala (Willemstad, Curaçao; 19 February 2022)

The Curaçao women's national football team (Papiamento: selekshon feminino di futbòl Kòrsou, Dutch: Curaçaos vrouwenvoetbalelftal) is overseen by the Curaçao Football Federation. Formally representing Netherlands Antilles, the team changed jurisdiction in 2010 when Curaçao gained autonomy from the Netherlands.

== Results and fixtures ==
The following is a list of match results in the last 12 months, as well as any future matches that have been scheduled.

Legend

Win Draw Lose Fixture

=== 2025 ===
24 October 2025 Friendly	Suriname	4-0	Curaçao	Delft, Netherlands
				Stadium: Sportpark DHC

30 November 2026 CONCACAF W Championship Q	Curaçao	1-6	Panama	Stadion Rignaal 'Jean' Francisca, Willemstad
20:00 UTC−4	Martina 71'	Report (FIFA); Report (CONCACAF)	Riley 4'; Parris 50'; E. Arauz 66', 73'; Jaén 79'; Tanner 90+2'	Referee: Marie-Soleil Beaudoin (Canada)

== Coaching staff ==
=== Current coaching staff ===
Role	Name	Ref.
Head coach	Dean Gorré	

=== Managerial history ===
- (Curaçao) Marizol Boomberg (20??-2021)
- Ana Vargas (2021-???)
- (Suriname) Dean Gorré (????-2025)
- (Netherlands) Johan van Heertum (2025–present)

== Players ==
=== Current squad ===
- The following 22 players were called up for the 2026 CONCACAF W Championship qualification match against Panama on 30 November 2025.

Caps and goals as of 4 December 2023, after the match against Cayman Islands.

No.	Pos.	Player	Date of birth (age)	Caps	Goals	Club
	GK	Thiheyna Susana	25 July 2000 (age 26)	2	0	(Curaçao Football Federation) Undeba
	GK	Kingnaichely Provence	1 September 2009 (age 17)		0	(Curaçao Football Federation) Jong Holland
	DF	Rozan Snoek	5 October 2002 (age 24)	0	0	(Royal Dutch Football Association) RKSV HBC
	DF	Naychelene Nisia	10 January 2007 (age 19)	4	0	(Royal Dutch Football Association) Excelsior
	DF	Ignarda Pieternella	17 March 1993 (age 33)	12	0	(Curaçao Football Federation) Victory Boys
	DF	Diangely's Strijdhaftig		2	0	(Royal Dutch Football Association) FC Skillz
	DF	Charnainelys Andrea	11 August 2005 (age 21)	3	0	(Curaçao Football Federation) Excellence
	DF	Ruwenna Cristina	24 May 2008 (age 18)	0	0	(Curaçao Football Federation) UNDEBA
	DF	Ludmarie Flaneur	18 April 2005 (age 21)		0	(Royal Dutch Football Association) BVV Barendrecht
	MF	Jeleaugh Rosa	18 July 2004 (age 22)	6	2	(Hellenic Football Federation) Acharnaikos Women Football Club
	MF	Lindsey Hart	27 November 2003 (age 22)	0	0	(Royal Dutch Football Association) Excelsior Maassluis
	MF	Riesmarly Tokaay	11 February 2003 (age 23)	11	1	(Curaçao Football Federation) Victory Boys
	MF	Kyara Bernadina	16 March 2007 (age 19)	3	0	(Royal Dutch Football Association) FC Skillz
	MF	Akisha Lohman	20 August 2003 (age 23)	0	0	(Royal Dutch Football Association) Be Quick '28
	MF	Shermilyene Leito			0	(German Football Association) MSV Duisburg
	FW	Raëngelly Keller	16 November 2005 (age 20)	0	0	(Royal Dutch Football Association) Be Quick '28
	FW	Kadisha Martina (captain)	28 August 2000 (age 26)	11	8	(United States Soccer Federation) Cumberland Phoenix
	FW	Taïsha Hansen	5 November 2002 (age 23)	8	5	(Royal Dutch Football Association) Be Quick '28
	FW	Gervionna Martina	31 January 2006 (age 20)	4	0	(Curaçao Football Federation) Victory Boys
	FW	Chelsea Kenton	2 September 1999 (age 27)			(Royal Dutch Football Association) WV-HEDW
	FW	Shi-jona Martina	14 November 2004 (age 21)			(Royal Dutch Football Association) Excelsior
	FW	Destiny Koko	23 October 2009 (age 16)			(Royal Dutch Football Association) De Graafschap

=== Recent call-ups ===
The following players have been called up to Curaçao squad in the past 12 months.

Pos.	Player	Date of birth (age)	Caps	Goals	Club	Latest call-up

== Records ==
*Active players in bold, statistics correct as of 2020.

=== Most capped players ===
#	Player	Year(s)	Caps

=== Top goalscorers ===
#	Player	Year(s)	Goals	Caps

== Competitive record ==
=== FIFA Women's World Cup ===
FIFA Women's World Cup record
Year	Result	Pld	W	D*	L	GF	GA
as Netherlands Antilles
(China) 1991 to (United States) 2003	Did not exist						
(China) 2007	Did not qualify						
(Germany) 2011	Did not enter						
as Curaçao
(Canada) 2015	Did not enter						
(France) 2019	Did not qualify						
(Australia) (New Zealand) 2023	Did not qualify						
(Brazil) 2027	Did not qualify						
(Costa Rica) (Jamaica) (Mexico) (United States) 2031	To be determined						
(United Kingdom) 2035	To be determined						
Total	-	-	-	-	-	-	-

*Draws include knockout matches decided on penalty kicks.

=== CONCACAF W Championship ===
CONCACAF W Championship record								Qualification record					
Year	Result	Pld	W	D*	L	GF	GA	Pld	W	D*	L	GF	GA
as Netherlands Antilles								as Netherlands Antilles					
(Haiti) 1991 to (United States) (Canada) 2002	Did not exist							Did not exist					
(United States) 2006	Did not qualify							4	2	0	2	6	9
(Mexico) 2010	Did not enter							Did not enter					
as Curaçao								as Curaçao					
(United States) 2014	Did not enter							Did not enter					
(United States) 2018	Did not qualify							3	1	0	2	2	5
(Mexico) 2022	Did not qualify							4	1	0	3	2	15
(United States) 2026	Did not qualify							4	1	0	3	4	16
Total	-	-	-	-	-	-	-	12	5	0	10	14	45

*Draws include knockout matches decided on penalty kicks.

=== CONCACAF W Gold Cup ===
CONCACAF W Gold Cup record								Qualification record							
Year	Result	GP	W	D*	L	GF	GA	Division	Group	GP	W	D*	L	GF	GA
(United States) 2024	Did not qualify							C	D	4	4	0	0	18	4
(N/A) 2029	To be determined							To be determined							
Total	–	–	–	–	–	–	–	–	–	4	4	0	0	18	4

*Draws include knockout matches decided on penalty kicks.

=== CFU Women's Caribbean Cup ===
CFU Women's Caribbean Cup record
Year	Result	Pld	W	D*	L	GF	GA
as Netherlands Antilles
(Haiti) 2000	Did not enter						
as Curaçao
(Trinidad and Tobago) 2014	Did not enter						
(Trinidad and Tobago) 2018	N/A	2	1	0	1	4	4
Total	–	2	1	0	1	4	4

*Draws include knockout matches decided on penalty kicks.

== See also ==
- Curaçao national football team
- Curaçao national football team results
- List of Curaçao international footballers
- Curaçao national under-23 football team
- Curaçao national under-20 football team
- Curaçao national under-17 football team
- Curaçao national futsal team
- Curaçao national beach soccer team
- Curaçao women's national football team
- Curaçao women's national football team results
- List of Curaçao women's international footballers
- Curaçao women's national under-20 football team
- Curaçao women's national under-17 football team
