= Naomi Piqué =

Surinamese footballer (born 2000)

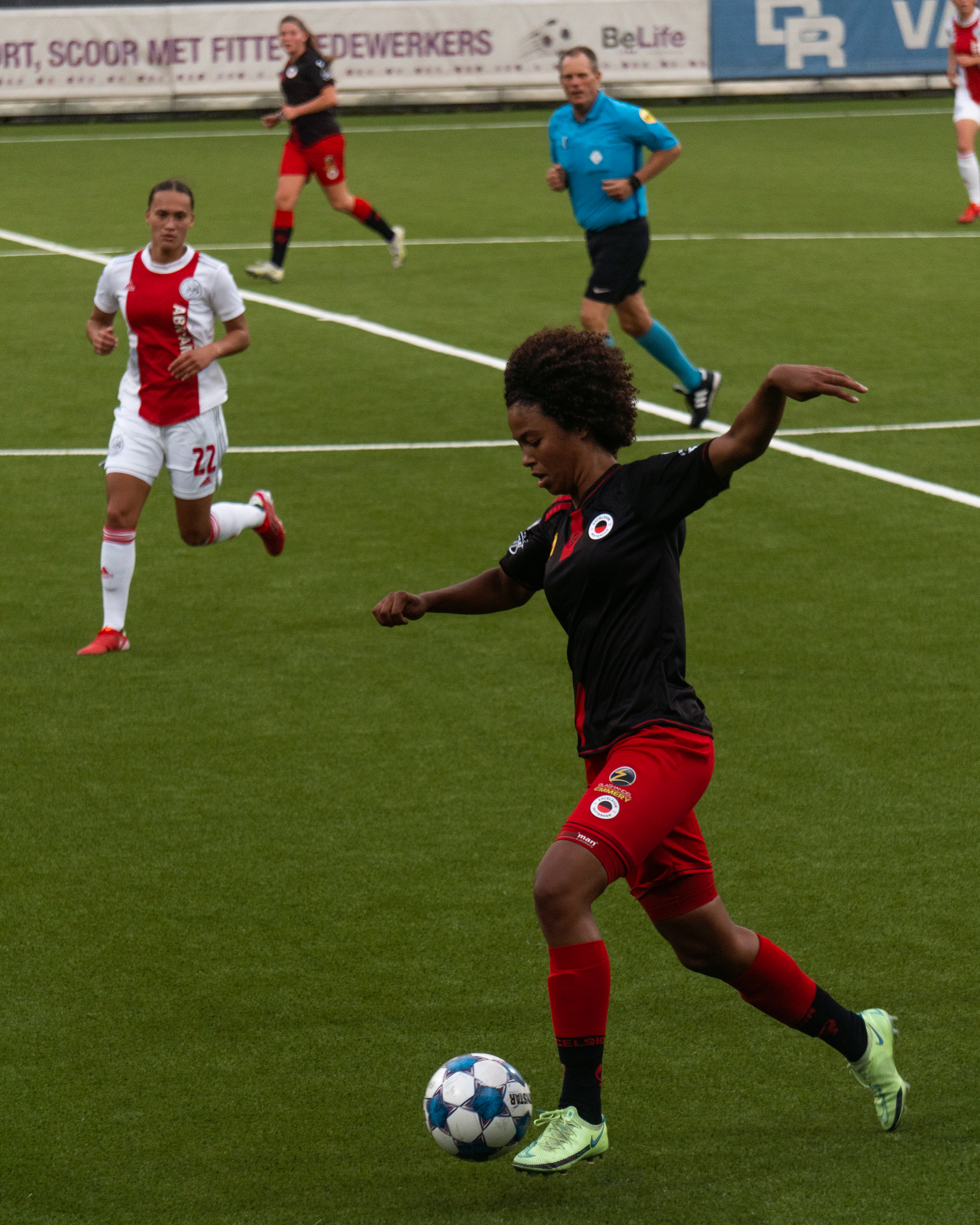
- Naomi Piqué in 2021

Personal information
- Date of birth: 12 June 2000 (age 26)
- Place of birth: Netherlands
- Position: Defender

Team information
- Current team: FC Utrecht
- Number: 12

Senior career*
Years	Team	Apps	(Gls)
2019	ADO Den Haag	2	(0)
2020–2023	Excelsior	64	(4)
2023	PSV	3	(0)
2024–	FC Utrecht	5	(0)

International career
	Suriname	8	(0)
- * Club domestic league appearances and goals

Naomi Piqué (born 12 June 2000) is a footballer who plays as a defender for FC Utrecht. Born in the Netherlands, she is a Suriname international.

== Early life ==
Pique started her career with Dutch side ADO Den Haag. She was regarded as unable to establish herself while playing for the club.

== Club career ==
In 2020, she signed for Dutch side Excelsior. In 2023, she signed for Dutch side PSV.

== International career ==
She is a Suriname international. She played for the Suriname women's national football team for 2023 FIFA Women's World Cup qualification.

== Style of play ==
She mainly operates as a defender. She specifically operates as a central defender.

== Personal life ==
She was born in 2000 in the Netherlands. She studied business administration.
