= Gabriella Cuevas =

Dominican footballer (born 1993)

Personal information
- Full name: Gabriella Elizabeth Cuevas Reyes
- Birth name: Gabriella Elizabeth Cuevas
- Date of birth: 15 August 1993 (age 33)
- Place of birth: Wayne, New Jersey, U.S.
- Height: 1.65 m (5 ft 5 in)
- Position: Centre-back

Team information
- Current team: Alajuelense

Youth career
- 2008–2016: Immaculate Heart Academy Blue Eagles

College career
| Years | Team | Apps | (Gls) |
| 2011–2015 | UConn Huskies | 38 | (0) |
| 2016–2017 | Monmouth Hawks | 36 | (4) |

Senior career*
| Years | Team | Apps | (Gls) |
| 2018 | Sky Blue FC | 0 | (0) |
| 2018–2019 | Kiryat Gat | 23 | (1) |
| 2019–2020 | Ramat HaSharon | 12 | (0) |
| 2021–2022 | KuPS | 42 | (3) |
| 2023 | UKS SMS Łódź | 8 | (0) |
| 2024 | Gotham FC | 0 | (0) |
| 2024– | Alajuelense | | |

International career^{‡}
| 2021– | Dominican Republic | 10 | (1) |
- * Club domestic league appearances and goals as of 28 May 2023 ‡ National team caps and goals as of 14 April 2026

Gabriella Elizabeth Cuevas Reyes (born 15 August 1993) is a footballer who plays as a centre-back for Costa Rican Women's Premier Division club Alajuelense. Born in the United States, she plays for the Dominican Republic women's national team.

== Early life ==
Cuevas was raised in Wayne, New Jersey to a Colombian father and a Dominican mother.

== High school and college career ==
Cuevas has attended the Immaculate Heart Academy in Washington Township, Bergen County, New Jersey; the University of Connecticut in Storrs, Connecticut and the Monmouth University in West Long Branch, New Jersey.

== Club career ==
Cuevas has played for FC Kiryat Gat and FC Ramat HaSharon in Israel and for KuPS in Finland.

== International career ==
Cuevas made her senior debut for the Dominican Republic on 22 October 2021, starting in a 3–0 friendly home win over Bolivia.

== Career statistics ==
=== International goals ===
Scores and results list Dominican Republic goal tally first

| No. | Date | Venue | Opponent | Score | Result | Competition | Ref. |
|---|---|---|---|---|---|---|---|
| 1 | 25 October 2021 | Félix Sánchez Olympic Stadium, Santo Domingo, Dominican Republic | Bolivia | 1–0 | 1–1 | Friendly | |
| 2 | 6 March 2026 | Raymond E. Guishard Technical Centre, The Valley, Anguilla | Anguilla | 7–0 | 8–0 | 2026 CONCACAF W Championship qualification | |

== Honours ==
UKS SMS Łódź

- Polish Cup: 2022–23
