= Selena Babb =

Footballer (born 1995)

Personal information
- Full name: Selena Delia Babb
- Date of birth: 26 August 1995 (age 31)
- Place of birth: Rotterdam, Netherlands
- Height: 1.76 m (5 ft 9 in)
- Position: Goalkeeper

Team information
- Current team: Como
- Number: 32

Senior career*
Years	Team	Apps	(Gls)
2013–2014	FC Utrecht	0	(0)
2017–2018	Excelsior	1	(0)
2018–2019	Olimpia Cluj		
2019	Apollon Ladies		
2019–2020	Sporting de Huelva	1	(0)
2020–2022	Sampdoria	4	(0)
2021	→ AC Milan (loan)	2	(0)
2022	→ AC Milan (loan)	0	(0)
2022–2026	AC Milan	5	(0)
2026–	Como	0	(0)
- * Club domestic league appearances and goals as of 1 August 2026

Selena Delia Babb (born 26 August 1995) is a professional footballer who plays as a goalkeeper who plays for Serie A Women club Como. Born in the Netherlands, she plays for the Suriname national team.

== Career ==
Selena made her league debut for Excelsior against ADO Den Haag on 25 May 2018.

Selena Babb transferred to Sporting de Huelva from the Cypriot side Apollon Ladies F.C. in 2019. She made her league debut against Real Sociedad on 7 December 2019.

A year later in 2020, Babb transferred to the Serie A side Sampdoria. In July 2020, she joined AC Milan on a one-year loan, making her league debut against Sassuolo on 15 May 2021.

In 2022, Babb rejoined Milan on another one-year loan. She was named on the bench for the rest of the season.

She joined Milan permanently and made her league debut against Fiorentina on 7 May 2023. On 19 August 2023, it was announced that she had extended her contract.

On 20 August 2026, Babb joined Serie A Women side FC Como Women on a one-year contract.
