= Danielle Fuentes =

Salvadoran footballer (born 2000)

Personal information
- Full name: Danielle Marie Fuentes Portillo
- Date of birth: 23 August 2000 (age 26)
- Place of birth: Rockville, Maryland, U.S.
- Height: 1.67 m (5 ft 6 in)
- Position: Midfielder

Team information
- Current team: Tijuana
- Number: 11

College career
Years	Team	Apps	(Gls)
2018–2019	UMBC Retrievers	32	(5)
2020–2022	South Alabama Jaguars	50	(10)

Senior career*
Years	Team	Apps	(Gls)
2023–2024	Necaxa	31	(7)
2024–2025	Cruz Azul	23	(3)
2025–	Tijuana	23	(1)

International career
2023–	El Salvador	9	(1)
- * Club domestic league appearances and goals as of 9 February 2026

Danielle Marie Fuentes Portillo (born 23 August 2000) is a footballer who plays as a midfielder for Liga MX Femenil club Tijuana. Born in the United States, she plays for El Salvador women's national team.

== Early life and education ==
Nicknamed "Dani", Fuentes attended the University of South Alabama, where she recorded ten assists for the Jaguars.

== International career ==
Fuentes played for the El Salvador women's national football team at the 2023 Central American and Caribbean Games, helping the team achieve third place.

== Personal life ==
Fuentes has a brother.

== International goals ==
Scores and results list El Salvador's goal tally first.

No.	Date	Venue	Opponent	Score	Result	Competition
1.	28 February 2024	Shell Energy Stadium, Houston, United States	Paraguay	1–1	2–3	2024 CONCACAF W Gold Cup
2.	13 July 2024	Estadio Las Delicias, Santa Tecla, El Salvador	Peru	3–1	3–1	Friendly
3.	25 February 2025	Estadio Rodrigo Paz Delgado, Quito, Ecuador	Ecuador	3–1	3–1	Friendly
4.	2 December 2025	Estadio Jorge "El Mágico" González, San Salvador, El Salvador	Honduras	1–0	3–0	2026 CONCACAF W Championship qualification
5.	1 March 2026	Estadio Las Delicias, Santa Tecla, El Salvador	Barbados	1–0	13–0	2026 CONCACAF W Championship qualification
6.	1 March 2026	Estadio Las Delicias, Santa Tecla, El Salvador	Barbados	4–0	13–0	2026 CONCACAF W Championship qualification
7.	1 March 2026	Estadio Las Delicias, Santa Tecla, El Salvador	Barbados	12–0	13–0	2026 CONCACAF W Championship qualification
