= Aisha Solórzano =

Guatemalan footballer (born 1998)

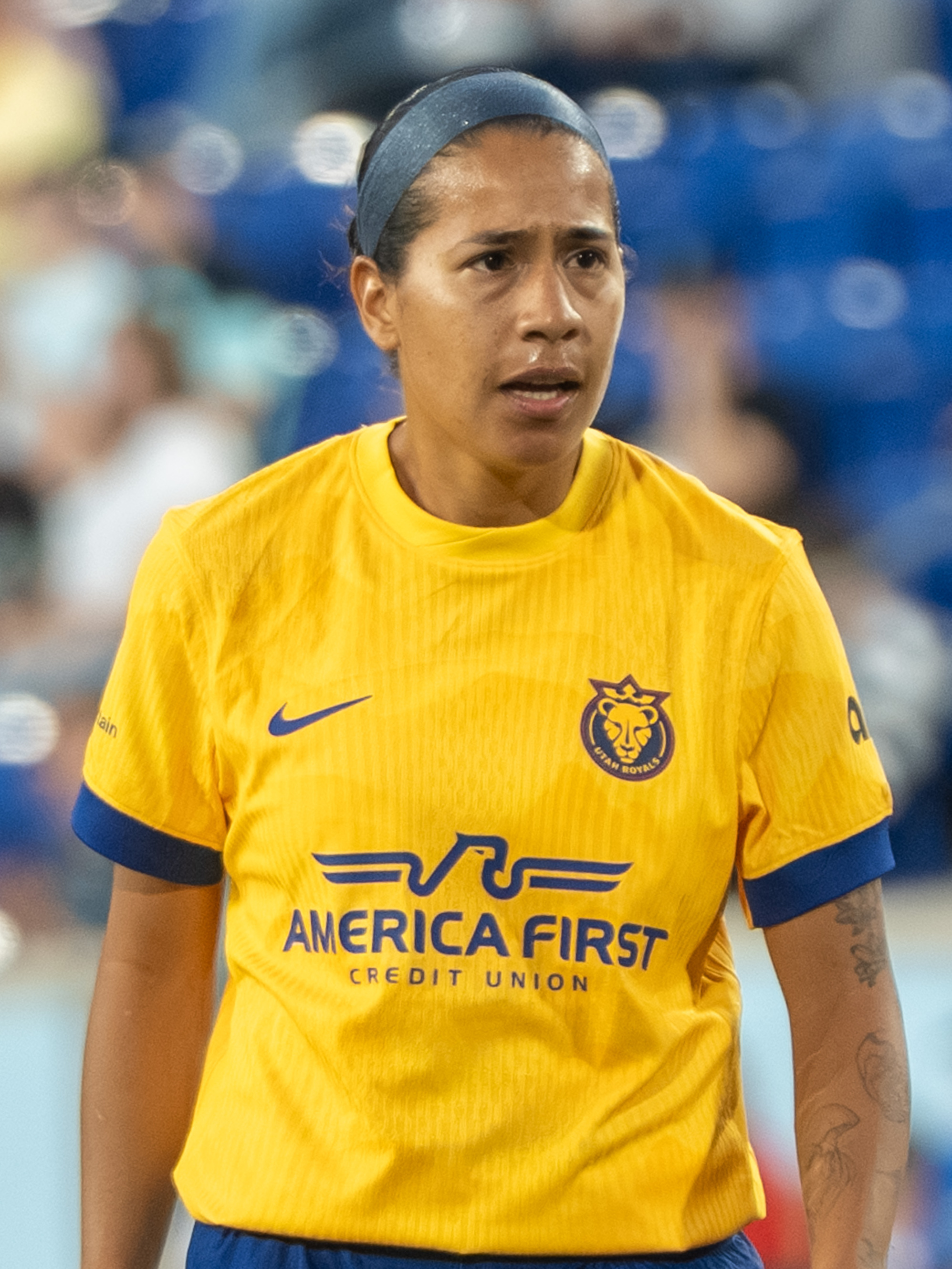
- Solórzano with the Utah Royals in 2025

Personal information
- Full name: Aisha Keshy Solórzano García
- Date of birth: 13 April 1998 (age 28)
- Place of birth: Guatemala City, Guatemala
- Height: 1.62 m (5 ft 4 in)
- Position: Forward

Team information
- Current team: Juárez
- Number: 13

College career
Years	Team	Apps	(Gls)
2017–2021	Southeastern Fire	78	(40)

Senior career*
Years	Team	Apps	(Gls)
2022–2023	Unifut Rosal	16	(22)
2023–2024	Puebla	29	(14)
2024–2025	Tijuana	16	(16)
2025	Utah Royals	20	(1)
2026–	Juárez	0	(0)

International career^{‡}
- Guatemala U17
2014–	Guatemala	12	(5)
- * Club domestic league appearances and goals ‡ National team caps and goals as of 6 March 2026

Aisha Keshy Solórzano García (born 13 April 1998) is a Guatemalan professional footballer who plays as a forward for Liga MX club Juárez and the Guatemala national team.

== Club career ==
On 28 July 2024, Solórzano scored three goals (a hat-trick) for Liga MX club Tijuana against the Seattle Reign in the inaugural Summer Cup between teams from Mexico and the United States. Tijuana won the match by a score of 3–2.

The Utah Royals announced that they had signed Solórzano to a three-year contract on a transfer from Tijuana on 13 January 2025. In September 2025, while playing for the Royals, Solórzano became the first Guatemalan player to score in the NWSL. On 15 December 2025, Solórzano and the Royals agreed on a mutual contract termination. She had made 20 appearances (15 starts) in her lone season in the NWSL.

The same day of her departure from Utah, Solórzano was announced at Mexican club FC Juárez.

== International goals ==
No.	Date	Venue	Opponent	Score	Result	Competition
1.	29 October 2023	Independence Park, Kingston, Jamaica	Jamaica	2–2	2–2	2024 CONCACAF W Gold Cup qualification
2.	6 March 2026	Truman Bodden Sports Complex, George Town, Cayman Islands	Cayman Islands	2–0	13–0	2026 CONCACAF W Championship qualification
3.	6 March 2026	Truman Bodden Sports Complex, George Town, Cayman Islands	Cayman Islands	5–0	13–0	2026 CONCACAF W Championship qualification
4.	6 March 2026	Truman Bodden Sports Complex, George Town, Cayman Islands	Cayman Islands	6–0	13–0	2026 CONCACAF W Championship qualification
5.	6 March 2026	Truman Bodden Sports Complex, George Town, Cayman Islands	Cayman Islands	9–0	13–0	2026 CONCACAF W Championship qualification
6.	9 June 2026	Cementos Progreso Stadium, Guatemala City, Guatemala	El Salvador	1–1	1–5	Friendly
