= Bárbara Murillo =

Honduran footballer (born 1994)

Personal information
- Full name: Bárbara Eloísa Murillo Huete
- Date of birth: 24 December 1994 (age 31)
- Place of birth: Francisco Morazán, Honduras
- Height: 1.70 m (5 ft 7 in)
- Position: Defender

Senior career*
Years	Team	Apps	(Gls)
- Universitario
- Cortuluá
- Miami United FC
- FC Lustenau / Dornbirn
2024	Puebla	7	(0)

International career
- Honduras
- * Club domestic league appearances and goals

Bárbara Eloísa Murillo Huete (born 24 December 1994) is a Honduran footballer who plays as a defender for Liga MX Femenil club Puebla and the Honduras women's national team.

== Career ==
Murillo started her career in Peru. After that, she played in Colombia. After that, she played in the United States. After that, she trained in Mexico. After that, she played in Austria.

== Career statistics ==
Scores and results list Honduras's goal tally first.

No.	Date	Venue	Opponent	Score	Result	Competition
1.	17 April 2026	Estadio Nacional Chelato Uclés, Tegucigalpa, Honduras	Barbados	2–0	4–0	2026 CONCACAF W Championship qualification
