= Eva Frazzoni =

Bermudian footballer (born 1998)

Personal information
- Full name: Eva Michelle Dismont Frazzoni
- Date of birth: 10 February 1997 (age 29)
- Place of birth: Bermuda
- Position: Midfielder

Team information
- Current team: AFC Sudbury

Youth career
- PHC Zebras
- 2011–?: Somerset Trojans

College career
| Years | Team | Apps | (Gls) |
- University of Essex
| 2016–2020 | College of Saint Rose | 81 | (8) |

Senior career*
| Years | Team | Apps | (Gls) |
| 2020 | Gamla Upsala SK | 7 | (2) |
| 2022 | Somerset Trojans Big Ballers | | |
| 2022–2023 | Hashtag United | 30 | (5) |
| 2023– | AFC Sudbury | 21 | (2) |

International career
| 2013 | Bermuda U20 | | |
| 2017? | Bermuda U18 | | |
| 2013– | Bermuda | 11 | (2) |
- * Club domestic league appearances and goals

Eva Frazzoni (born 10 February 1998) is a Bermudian footballer who plays as a midfielder for AFC Sudbury.

== Early life and youth career ==
Frazzoni began football at a young age before focusing on tennis and then refocusing on football.

Frazzoni is a product of Bermudan sides PHC Zebras and Somerset Trojans.

== College career ==
Frazzoni studied for a master's degree at the English University of Essex, and played for their women's team, receiving interest from English clubs. She also played soccer for the College of Saint Rose in the United States.

== Club career ==
In 2022, Frazzoni worked as an intern for the Association of Bermuda Insurers and Reinsurers.

After that, she signed for English side Hashtag United for the 2022–23 season. She joined AFC Sudbury in 2023.

== International career ==
She has represented Bermuda internationally at under-20 level.

Frazzoni has represented Bermuda internationally. She has captained the Bermuda women's national football team.

== International goals ==
| No. | Date | Venue | Opponent | Score | Result | Competition |
|---|---|---|---|---|---|---|
| 1. | 26 September 2023 | Arnos Vale Stadium, Kingstown, Saint Vincent and the Grenadines | Saint Vincent and the Grenadines | 3–0 | 4–0 | 2024 CONCACAF W Gold Cup qualification |
| 2. | 27 November 2025 | Truman Bodden Sports Complex, George Town, Cayman Islands | Cayman Islands | 1–0 | 4–0 | 2026 CONCACAF W Championship qualification |
| 3. | 1 December 2025 | Estadio Cementos Progreso, Guatemala City, Guatemala | Guatemala | 1–4 | 1–4 | 2026 CONCACAF W Championship qualification |

== Style of play ==
Frazzoni mainly operates as a midfielder but can and has played other positions, including wing-back.
