= Netherlands Antilles women's national football team =

Netherlands Antilles
- Association: Nederlands Antilliaanse; Voetbal Unie
- Confederation: CONCACAF (North America)
- FIFA code: ANT
First colours	Second colours

FIFA ranking
- Highest: 128 (May 2006)
- Lowest: 144 (December 2007)

First international
- Cayman Islands 1–2 Netherlands Antilles (Georgetown, Cayman Islands; 18 March 2006)

Last international
- Aruba 0–2 Netherlands Antilles (Netherlands Antilles; 1 July 2007)

Biggest win
- Aruba 0–2 Netherlands Antilles (Netherlands Antilles; 1 July 2007)

Biggest defeat
- Suriname 7–1 Netherlands Antilles (Oranjestad, Aruba; 3 May 2006)

Netherlands Antilles women's national football team was the women's national team of the former Netherlands Antilles. They played in their first FIFA recognised match in 2006. They were not ranked by FIFA As of March 2012. The country had two youth national teams, Netherlands Antilles women's national under-17 football team and Netherlands Antilles women's national under-19 football team, who have competed in international matches. Development of the sport in the country faced challenges as football was the sixth most popular sport in the country.

== History ==
The Netherlands Antilles played their first FIFA recognised match in 2006. The national team played 2 games in 2005 that were not recognised by FIFA. The Netherlands Antilles competed in the Women's Caribbean Cup 2006. In a preliminary round match against the Cayman Islands women's national football team in Georgetown, Cayman Islands on 18 March, the Netherlands Antilles won 2–1. On the return leg at home, on 25 March, they won 1–0. They were put into Group B for group play. Haiti women's national football team was supposed to be in their group but did not play in the Aruba based game because of visa issues. In their first game against Suriname on 3 May in Curacao, before a crowd of 200, they lost 1–7 with Thielman scoring the team's only goal in the 48th minute. In their second match on 5 May against Aruba women's national football team in Oranjestad, they won 2–1 before a crowd of 500. Soliana scored in the 50th minute and Demey scored in the 70th minute for the Netherlands Antilles. In 2007, Netherlands Antilles women's national football team competed in the Torneo Internacional di Futbòl di Dama. It was a friendly tournament organized by the Nederlands Antilliaanse Voetbal Unie to fund raise for breast cancer. In the semifinals on 30 June, they lost 0–1 to Suriname. In the third place match against Aruba, Netherlands Antilles won 2–0. As of March 2012, the team was not ranked in the world by FIFA.

== Under 17 ==
Netherlands Antilles women's national under-17 football team played 2 games in 2006, and had two training sessions a week that year. The team competed in the CONCACAF Under 17 Women's Qualifying Tournament 2010 in the Caribbean Qualifying part in Group B. On 12 October 2009, they lost 0–4 to the Dominican Republic. On 14 October, they lost 0–4 to Aruba. On 16 October, they lost 0–16 to Jamaica. They finished last in their group, with three losses, scoring zero goals and allowing twenty-four goals.

== Under 19/20 ==
Netherlands Antilles women's national under-19 football team competed at the CONCACAF Under 19 Women's Qualifying Tournament 2005/06 in Group B. They played the first round in Suriname. On 20 September, they played Anguilla whom they lost to 2–5. On 22 September, they tied Dominica 0–0. On 24 September, they lost to hosts Suriname 0–6. They finished last in their group with one tie and two losses, scoring only two goals while conceding eleven.

== Background and development ==
Nederlands Antilliaanse Voetbal Unie was founded in 1921 and became affiliated with FIFA in 1932. Women's representation was not required on the board of the federation, which did not have any full-time employees devoted exclusively to women's football.

The most popular sports in the country were softball and volleyball, with football ranking sixth. In 2006, there were 80 registered footballers: 60 senior players and 20 youth players. This was an increase from 2000; numbers of registered players went unrecorded from 2001 to 2004. In 2006, there were 40 football teams in the country, one of which was mixed gendered and two women only.

== Competitive record ==
=== FIFA Women's World Cup ===
FIFA Women's World Cup record
Year	Result	Pld	W	D*	L	GF	GA
(China) 1991 to (United States) 2003	Did not exist						
(China) 2007	Did not qualify						
(Germany) 2011	Did not enter						
Total	–	–	–	–	–	–	–

*Draws include knockout matches decided on penalty kicks.

=== Olympic Games ===
Summer Olympics record									Qualifying record					
Year	Round	Position	Pld	W	D*	L	GF	GA	Pld	W	D*	L	GF	GA
(United States) 1996 to (Greece) 2004	Did not exist								Did not exist					
(China) 2008	Did not enter								Did not enter					
(United Kingdom) 2012	Did not enter								Did not enter					
Total	–	–	–	–	–	–	–	–	–	–	–	–	–	–

*Draws include knockout matches decided on penalty kicks.

=== CONCACAF Women's Championship ===
CONCACAF Women's Championship record								Qualification record					
Year	Result	Pld	W	D*	L	GF	GA	Pld	W	D*	L	GF	GA
(Haiti) 1991 to (United States) (Canada) 2002	Did not exist							Did not exist					
(United States) 2006	Did not qualify							4	2	0	2	6	9
(Mexico) 2010	Did not enter							Did not enter					
Total	–	–	–	–	–	–	–	4	2	0	2	6	9

*Draws include knockout matches decided on penalty kicks.
