= Chanté Dompig =

Surinamese footballer (born 2001)

Personal information
- Full name: Chanté-Mary Delorean Dompig
- Date of birth: 12 February 2001 (age 25)
- Place of birth: Amsterdam, Netherlands
- Height: 1.73 m (5 ft 8 in)
- Position: Forward

Team information
- Current team: Napoli
- Number: 11

Youth career
- SC Buitenveldert

Senior career*
Years	Team	Apps	(Gls)
2017–2020	VV Alkmaar	21	(4)
2020–2022	Empoli	39	(10)
2022–2026	AC Milan	56	(14)
2026–	Napoli		

International career^{‡}
2022–2024	Netherlands U23	13	(2)
2025–	Suriname	1	(1)
- * Club domestic league appearances and goals as of 12 October 2025 ‡ National team caps and goals as of 2 December 2025

Chanté-Mary Delorean Dompig (born 12 February 2001) is a professional footballer who plays as a forward for Serie A club Napoli. Born in the Netherlands, she plays for the Suriname national team. Dompig previously played for AC Milan, Empoli, and then-Eredivisie club VV Alkmaar.

== Club career ==
Dompig played youth football in the Netherlands at local club BuitenVeldert and Telstar. She made her senior debut at 16 years of age in the Eredivisie at VV Alkmaar. In 2020, she transferred to Empoli in Italy's Serie A. She was named the Best Young Player in Serie A for the 2021/2022 season.

She joined AC Milan in January 2023.

On 6 August 2026, Dompig signed a contract with Napoli.

== International career ==
Born in the Netherlands, Dompig is of Surinamese descent. She was called up to the Suriname national team in November 2025. Dompig made her debut on 2 December 2025.

=== International goals ===
No.	Date	Venue	Opponent	Score	Result	Competition
1.	2 December 2025	Estadio Moca 85, Moca, Dominican Republic	Dominican Republic	2–0	2–2	2026 CONCACAF W Championship qualification

== Honours ==
Individual

- Serie A Best Young Player: 2021–22
