= Suriname women's national football team =

Women's national association football team representing Suriname

Suriname
- Nickname: Natio Uma (Women's National)
- Association: Surinaamse Voetbal Bond
- Confederation: CONCACAF
- Head coach: Mark de Vries
- FIFA code: SUR
First colours	Second colours

FIFA ranking
- Current: 140 ▼1 (16 June 2026)
- Highest: 81 (July 2003)
- Lowest: 137 (March 2025)

First international
- Haiti 3–1 Suriname (Castries, Saint Lucia; 14 November 2000)

Biggest win
- Suriname 11–0 Dominica (Paramaribo, Suriname; 3 December 2023)

Biggest defeat
- Haiti 10–0 Suriname (Bayamón, Puerto Rico; 3 October 2019)

The Suriname women's national football team (Dutch: Surinaams vrouwenvoetbalelftal) is the national women's football team of Suriname and is overseen by the Surinaamse Voetbal Bond.

== Player's strike ==
Hours before their final qualifying game versus Antigua & Barbuda, during the 2022 CONCACAF W Championship Qualifying, the entire team released a statement announcing their collective resignation. The team stated that barbaric circumstances and inequal treatment proved to be the final straw. Players demanded that the entire SVB board would step down, or else, all call-ups to the national team will be rejected. As of April 13, 2022, the Surinamese FA haven't released a statement following this decision.

== Results and fixtures ==
The following is a list of match results in the last 12 months, as well as any future matches that have been scheduled.

Legend

Win Draw Lose Fixture

=== 2025 ===
24 October 2025 Friendly	Suriname	4–0	Curaçao	Delft, Netherlands
				Stadium: Sportpark DHC

28 November 2025 CONCACAF W Championship qualification	Anguilla	1–3	Suriname	The Valley, Anguilla
	Ca. Johnson 90+1'	Report (FIFA); Report (CONCACAF)	Pereira 7'; van Netten 45', 75'	Stadium: Raymond E. Guishard Technical Centre; Referee: Marianela Araya (Costa Rica)

2 December 2025 CONCACAF W Championship qualification	Dominican Republic	2–2	Suriname	Moca, Dominican Republic
	Asenjo 16', 85'	Report (FIFA); Report (CONCACAF)	Hoekstra 3'; Dompig 5'	Stadium: Estadio Complejo Deportivo Moca 86; Referee: Lizzet García (Mexico)

== Players ==
=== Current squad ===
- The following players are called-up for the 2026 CONCACAF W Championship qualification matches against Haiti on 3 March 2026.

No.	Pos.	Player	Date of birth (age)	Caps	Goals	Club
	GK	Selena Babb	26 August 1995 (age 31)	0	0	(Italian Football Federation) AC Milan
	GK	Jaira Ijdo	25 July 2007 (age 19)	0	0	(Royal Dutch Football Association) Sparta Rotterdam
	GK	Latifah Moedjijo	22 August 2004 (age 22)	0	0	(Surinamese Football Association) SV Transvaal
	DF	Luna Doekhie		0	0	(Royal Dutch Football Association) CVV de Jodan Boys
	DF	Hadassa Brandon (Captain)	30 January 1999 (age 27)	6	0	(Surinamese Football Association) SV Robinhood
	DF	Dailindy Duyvesteijn	29 April 2006 (age 20)	0	0	(Football Association of the Czech Republic) Baník Ostrava
	DF	Ayani Emanuelson	5 January 2006 (age 20)	0	0	(Royal Dutch Football Association) Amsterdamsche FC
	DF	Naomi Piqué	12 June 2000 (age 26)	8	0	(Royal Dutch Football Association) De Graafschap
	DF	Kay-lee de Sanders	6 January 1998 (age 28)	0	0	(Italian Football Federation) AC Milan
	DF	Zoë van Wijngaarden	25 May 1998 (age 28)	0	0	(Royal Dutch Football Association) RKVV DSS
	DF	Jenske Steenwijk	8 November 2004 (age 21)	0	0	(German Football Association) Borussia Dortmund
	DF	Cady Chin See Chong	6 March 2003 (age 23)	3	0	(Surinamese Football Association) SV Transvaal
	MF	Rachel van Netten	31 March 2001 (age 25)	0	0	(Royal Dutch Football Association) RKVV DSS
	MF	Quinty Sabajo	1 August 1999 (age 27)	1	0	(Scottish Football Association) Rangers
	MF	Nicci Berrevoets	7 August 2005 (age 21)	0	0	(Royal Dutch Football Association) Hera United
	MF	Sifra Dulder	18 May 2004 (age 22)	0	0	(French Football Federation) Valenciennes FC
	MF	Lakeesha Eijken	7 July 2001 (age 25)	0	0	(Royal Dutch Football Association) Hera United
	FW	Chanté Dompig	12 February 2001 (age 25)	1	1	(Italian Football Federation) AC Milan
	FW	Jada Conijnenberg	26 August 2003 (age 23)	0	0	(Royal Belgian Football Association) OH Leuven
	FW	Isabelle Hoekstra	31 July 2003 (age 23)	0	0	(Royal Spanish Football Federation) FC Badalona
	FW	Katoucha Patra	1 October 1999 (age 27)	0	0	(Royal Dutch Football Association) Wartburgia
	FW	Estelle Pereira	24 September 2005 (age 21)	0	0	(Royal Dutch Football Association) Sparta Rotterdam
	FW	Everiette Doekoe	15 May 2006 (age 20)	3	0	(Surinamese Football Association) PVV

=== Recent call-ups ===
The following players have also been called up to the Suriname squad within the last twelve months.

Pos.	Player	Date of birth (age)	Caps	Goals	Club	Latest call-up
GK	Mayra Tjin-A-Koeng	6 June 1999 (age 27)	2	0	(Netherlands) Be Quick '28	
DF	Rowena Ondaan	26 June 1995 (age 31)	10	1	(Netherlands) XerxesDZB	
DF	Anne Bhagerath	5 August 1999 (age 27)	0	0	(Austria) SPG Lustenau/Dornbirn	
DF	Chanil Bonjaski				(Suriname) PVV	
DF	Nathalia Menezes				(Suriname)	
DF	Oglaya Grootfaam					
DF	Nagaya Tese					
DF	Charlize Sijderstroom					
DF	Taira Liefden		0	0	(Netherlands) Sparta Rotterdam	
DF	Ashleigh Weerden	7 June 1999 (age 27)	0	0	(England) Crystal Palace	
MF	Anjali Soechit		0	0	(Netherlands) Forum Sport	
MF	Griffith Vaissaire	29 October 1998 (age 27)	2	0	(Netherlands) Klaaswaal	
MF	Jennifer Beharie	24 January 2001 (age 25)	0	0	(Netherlands) Ter Leede	
MF	Andaya Landveld	1 October 1995 (age 31)	12	1	(Suriname) Happy Evita Girls	
MF	Stephanie Hanenberg				(Suriname) Broki	
MF	Janique Van Zichem				(Suriname)	
MF	Pamela Ansoe	17 November 1994 (age 31)	8	0	(Suriname) Transvaal	
MF	Shanika Kertoidjojo	25 January 2009 (age 17)			(Suriname) Transvaal	
FW	Imara Schutte	19 July 2007 (age 19)	0	0	(Spain) Madrid CFF	
FW	Kimara Alberg		0	0	(Netherlands) Sparta Rotterdam	
FW	Ravalcheny van Ommeren		0	0	(Netherlands) XerxesDZB	
FW	Saveira Gallant	25 May 2005 (age 21)			(Suriname) Adonai	
FW	Shamaira Stekkinger	25 June 1998 (age 28)	8	1	(Suriname) Transvaal	
FW	Shante Van Bercheycke				(Suriname) Adonai	

== Competitive record ==
=== FIFA Women's World Cup ===
FIFA Women's World Cup record
Year	Result	Pld	W	D*	L	GF	GA
(China) 1991	Did not enter						
(Sweden) 1995	Did not enter						
(United States) 1999	Did not enter						
(United States) 2003	Did not qualify						
(China) 2007	Did not qualify						
(Germany) 2011	Did not qualify						
(Canada) 2015	Did not qualify						
(France) 2019	Did not qualify						
(Australia) (New Zealand) 2023	Did not qualify						
(Brazil) 2027	Did not qualify						
(Costa Rica) (Jamaica) (Mexico) (United States) 2031	To be determined						
(United Kingdom) 2035	To be determined						
Total	–	–	–	–	–	–	–

*Draws include knockout matches decided on penalty kicks.

=== Olympic Games ===
Summer Olympics record									Qualifying record					
Year	Round	Position	Pld	W	D*	L	GF	GA	Pld	W	D*	L	GF	GA
(United States) 1996	Did not enter								1995 FIFA WWC					
(Australia) 2000	Did not enter								1999 FIFA WWC					
(Greece) 2004	Did not qualify								2	0	0	2	2	6
(China) 2008	Did not qualify								3	2	0	1	17	6
(United Kingdom) 2012	Did not qualify								3	1	0	2	3	7
(Brazil) 2016	Withdrew								Withdrew					
(Japan) 2020	Did not qualify								2	0	0	2	1	16
(France) 2024	Did not qualify								2022 CONCACAF W Championship					
(United States) 2028	Did not qualify								2026 CONCACAF W Championship					
Total	–	–	–	–	–	–	–	–	10	3	0	7	23	35

*Draws include knockout matches decided on penalty kicks.

=== CONCACAF W Championship ===
CONCACAF W Championship record								Qualification record					
Year	Result	Pld	W	D*	L	GF	GA	Pld	W	D*	L	GF	GA
(Haiti) 1991	Did not enter							Did not enter					
(United States) 1993	Did not enter							Did not enter					
(Canada) 1994	Did not enter							Did not enter					
(Canada) 1998	Did not enter							Did not enter					
(United States) 2000	Did not enter							Did not enter					
(United States) (Canada) 2002	Did not qualify							6	2	0	4	11	11
(United States) 2006	Did not qualify							5	2	0	3	11	11
(Mexico) 2010	Did not qualify							2	1	0	1	1	2
(United States) 2014	Did not qualify							2	0	0	2	0	5
(United States) 2018	Did not qualify							3	0	0	3	2	9
(Mexico) 2022	Did not qualify							4	2	0	2	10	12
(United States) 2026	Did not qualify							4	1	1	2	5	7
Total	–	–	–	–	–	–	–	26	8	1	16	40	57

*Draws include knockout matches decided on penalty kicks.

=== CONCACAF W Gold Cup ===
CONCACAF W Gold Cup record								Qualification record							
Year	Result	GP	W	D*	L	GF	GA	Division	Group	GP	W	D*	L	GF	GA
(United States) 2024	Did not qualify							B	A	6	4	0	2	17	2
(N/A) 2029	To be determined							To be determined							
Total	–	–	–	–	–	–	–	–	–	6	4	0	2	17	2

*Draws include knockout matches decided on penalty kicks.

=== Pan American Games ===
Pan American Games record
Year	Result	Pld	W	D*	L	GF	GA
(Canada) 1999	Did not enter						
(Dominican Republic) 2003	Did not enter						
(Brazil) 2007	Did not enter						
(Mexico) 2011	Did not qualify						
(Canada) 2015	Did not qualify						
(Peru) 2019	Did not qualify						
(Chile) 2023	Did not qualify						
Total	–	–	–	–	–	–	–

*Draws include knockout matches decided on penalty kicks.

=== Central American and Caribbean Games ===
Central American and Caribbean Games record
Year	Result	Pld	W	D*	L	GF	GA
(Puerto Rico) 2010	Did not enter						
(Mexico) 2014	Did not enter						
(Colombia) 2018	Did not enter						
(El Salvador) 2023	Did not enter						
Total	–	–	–	–	–	–	–

*Draws include knockout matches decided on penalty kicks.

=== CFU Women's Caribbean Cup ===
CFU Women's Caribbean Cup record
Year	Result	Pld	W	D*	L	GF	GA
(Haiti) 2000	Third place	3	1	1	1	5	4
(Trinidad and Tobago) 2014	First round	2	0	0	2	0	5
(Trinidad and Tobago) 2018	N/A	3	1	1	1	8	14
Total	–	8	2	2	4	13	23

*Draws include knockout matches decided on penalty kicks.

== Honours ==
=== Regional ===
- CFU Women's Caribbean Cup

Third place (1): 2000
