= Samantha López =

Guatemalan footballer (born 2003)

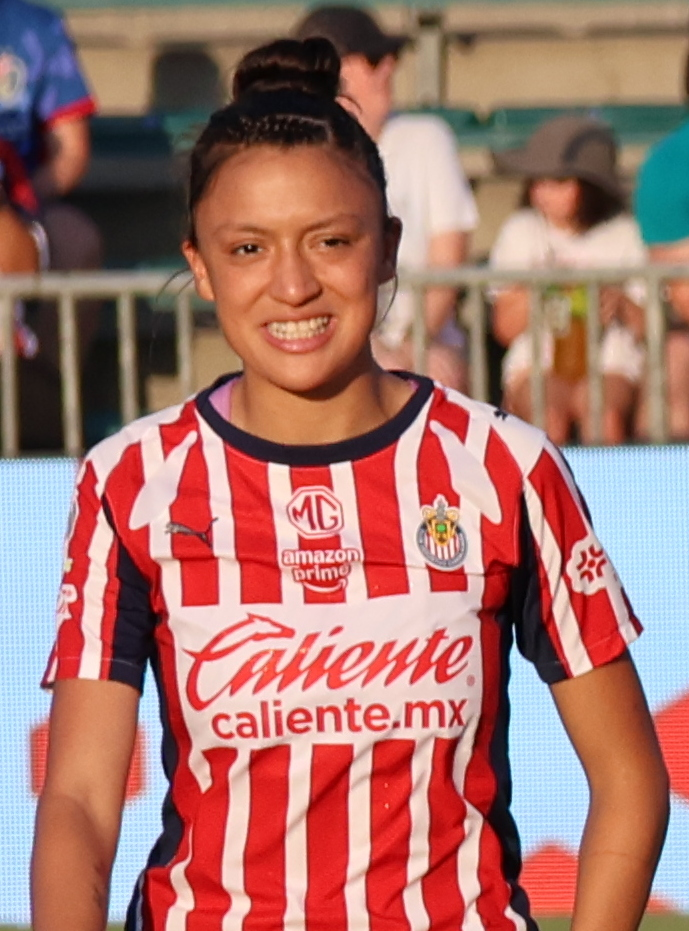
- López with Guadalajara in 2025

Personal information
- Full name: Samantha López Archila
- Date of birth: 16 April 2003 (age 23)
- Place of birth: California, United States
- Height: 1.73 m (5 ft 8 in)
- Position: Centre-back

Team information
- Current team: Guadalajara
- Number: 21

College career
Years	Team	Apps	(Gls)
2021	California Baptist Lancers	11	(0)

Senior career*
Years	Team	Apps	(Gls)
2022–2023	UNAM	16	(2)
2023–2025	Mazatlán	46	(3)
2025–	Guadalajara	5	(1)

International career^{‡}
2021–2022	Mexico U-20		
2024–	Guatemala	3	(0)
- * Club domestic league appearances and goals as of 31 January 2026 ‡ National team caps and goals as of 29 February 2024

Samantha López Archila (born 16 April 2003) is a professional footballer who plays as a centre-back for Liga MX Femenil club Guadalajara. Born and raised in the United States and a former Mexico youth international, she represents Guatemala internationally.

== Career ==
In 2022, she started her career in UNAM. In 2023, she was transferred to Mazatlán.

== International career ==
López was part of the squad of Mexico U-20 women's national football team that finished as Runners-up at the 2022 CONCACAF Women's U-20 Championship. She was also part of the team that participated in the 2022 FIFA U-20 Women's World Cup in Costa Rica.

López made her senior debut for Guatemala on 9 April 2024 in a 3–0 friendly loss against Colombia.
