= Curaçao national football team results (2020–present) =

This article provides details of international football games played by the Curaçao national football team from 2020 to present.

== Results ==
Key
Win
Draw
Defeat

=== 2020 ===
30 March 2020 Friendly	Thailand	Cancelled	Curaçao	Bangkok, Thailand
		Report		Stadium: Rajamangala National Stadium

=== 2021 ===
25 March 2021 2022 World Cup qualification	Curaçao	5–0	Saint Vincent and the Grenadines	Willemstad, Curaçao
18:00 UTC−4	J. Bacuna 1', 35'; Van den Hurk 17'; Antonia 45'; Hooi 87'	Report		Stadium: Stadion dr. Antoine Maduro; Attendance: 0 Referee: Ricangel de Leça (Aruba)

28 March 2021 2022 World Cup qualification	Cuba	1–2	Curaçao	Guatemala City, Guatemala
15:00 UTC−6	Hernández 27'	Report	L. Bacuna 11'; Benschop 44'	Stadium: Estadio Doroteo Guamuch Flores; Attendance: 0 Referee: Germán Stanley Martínez Miranda (El Salvador)

5 June 2021 2022 World Cup qualification	British Virgin Islands	0–8	Curaçao	Guatemala City, Guatemala
15:00 UTC−6		Report	Kuwas 7'; Maria 9', 27'; L. Bacuna 11'; Benschop 18' (pen.), 22'; Gorré 57', 90+1'	Stadium: Estadio Manuel Felipe Carrera; Attendance: 0 Referee: William Anderson (Puerto Rico)

8 June 2021 2022 World Cup qualification	Curaçao	0–0	Guatemala	Willemstad, Curaçao
20:00 UTC−4		Report		Stadium: Ergilio Hato Stadium; Attendance: 3,000; Referee: Armando Villarreal (United States)

12 June 2021 2022 World Cup qualification	Panama	2–1	Curaçao	Panama City, Panama
18:15 UTC−5	Quintero 55'; Waterman 77'	Report	Janga 87'	Stadium: Estadio Nacional Rod Carew; Attendance: 7,000; Referee: Jaime Herrera Bonilla (El Salvador)

15 June 2021 2022 World Cup qualification	Curaçao	0–0	Panama	Willemstad, Curaçao
19:00 UTC−4		Report		Stadium: Ergilio Hato Stadium; Attendance: 2,760; Referee: Marco Ortíz (Mexico)

10 July 2021 2021 Gold Cup	El Salvador	Cancelled	Curaçao	Frisco, United States
16:00 UTC−5				Stadium: Toyota Stadium
Note: On 9 July 2021, Curaçao was removed as a participant due to a significant number of positive results across their staff and players of COVID-19 and replaced by Guatemala.

14 July 2021 2021 Gold Cup	Curaçao	Cancelled	Mexico	Dallas, United States
20:30 UTC−5				Stadium: Cotton Bowl
Note: On 9 July 2021, Curaçao was removed as a participant due to a significant number of positive results across their staff and players of COVID-19 and replaced by Guatemala.

18 July 2021 2021 Gold Cup	Curaçao	Cancelled	Trinidad and Tobago	Frisco, United States
21:00 UTC−5				Stadium: Toyota Stadium
Note: On 9 July 2021, Curaçao was removed as a participant due to a significant number of positive results across their staff and players of COVID-19 and replaced by Guatemala.

6 October 2021 Friendly	Bahrain	4–0	Curaçao	Riffa, Bahrain
19:00 UTC+3				Stadium: Bahrain National Stadium; Referee: Murad Al Zawahreh (Jordan)

9 October 2021 Friendly	Curaçao	1–2	New Zealand	Riffa, Bahrain
19:00 UTC+3				Stadium: Bahrain National Stadium; Referee: Mohammed Bunafoor (Bahrain)

=== 2022 ===
20 May 2022 Friendly	Curaçao	1–5	Ajax	Willemstad, Curaçao
20:00 UTC−4	Bacuna 27'		Ihattaren 29'; Rasmussen 32', 45', 67', 83'	Stadium: Ergilio Hato Stadium

3 June 2022 Nations League	Curaçao	0–1	Honduras	Willemstad, Curaçao
20:00 UTC−4		Report	Pinto 23'	Stadium: Ergilio Hato Stadium; Referee: Daneon Parchment (Jamaica)

6 June 2022 Nations League	Honduras	1–2	Curaçao	San Pedro Sula, Honduras
20:00 UTC−4	Quioto 90+4'	Report	L. Bacuna 34'; Van den Hurk 82'	Stadium: Estadio Olímpico Metropolitano; Referee: Juan Gabriel Calderón (Costa Rica)

9 June 2022 Nations League	Canada	4–0	Curaçao	Vancouver, Canada
19:30 UTC−7	Davies 27' (pen.), 71'; Vitória 42'; Cavallini 85'	Report		Stadium: BC Place; Attendance: 17,216; Referee: Nima Saghafi (United States)

24 September 2022 Friendly	Indonesia	3–2	Curaçao	Bandung, Indonesia
20:00 UTC+7	Klok 18'; Fachruddin 22'; Drajad 56'	Report	Janga 8'; J. Bacuna 25'	Stadium: Gelora Bandung Lautan Api Stadium; Attendance: 7,095; Referee: Abdul Hakim Mohd Haidi (Brunei)

27 September 2022 Friendly	Curaçao	1–2	Indonesia	Cibinong, Indonesia
20:00 UTC+7	Antonisse 47'	Report	Drajad 3'; Dendy 87'	Stadium: Pakansari Stadium; Attendance: 21,819; Referee: Xaypaseuth Pongsanit (Laos)

24 November 2022 2022 ABCS Tournament	Curaçao	2–2 (5–3 p)	Aruba	Willemstad, Curaçao
21:00 UTC−4				Stadium: Stadion Rignaal Jean Francisca

26 November 2022 2022 ABCS Tournament	Suriname	2–2 (5–6 p)	Curaçao	Willemstad, Curaçao
21:00 UTC−4	Wijks 18'; Rigters 72'		Rosa 67'; Martina 96' (pen.)	Stadium: Stadion Rignaal Jean Francisca

=== 2023 ===
25 March 2023 Nations League	Curaçao	0–2	Canada	Willemstad, Curaçao
21:00 UTC−4		Report	David 23'; Larin 43'	Stadium: Ergilio Hato Stadium; Referee: Juan Gabriel Calderón (Costa Rica)

28 March 2023 Friendly	Argentina	7–0	Curaçao	Santiago del Estero, Argentina
20:30 UTC−3	Messi 20', 33', 37'; González 23'; Fernández 35'; Di María 78' (pen.); Montiel 87'	Report		Stadium: Estadio Único Madre de Ciudades; Attendance: 42,000; Referee: Gustavo Tejera (Uruguay)

16 June 2023 Gold Cup qualification	Curaçao	1–1 (2–3 p)	Saint Kitts and Nevis	Fort Lauderdale, United States
21:00 UTC−4	Locadia 22'		Terrell 83'	Stadium: DRV PNK Stadium
	Penalties
	Felida (penalty missed); J. Bacuna (penalty scored); Janga (penalty scored); Anita (penalty missed); L. Bacuna (penalty missed)		(penalty missed) Sawyers; (penalty scored) Lewis; (penalty scored) Bertie; (penalty scored) Terrell

=== 2024 ===
21 March Hybrid match	Hull City (England)	0–1	Curaçao	Antalya, Turkey
			Janga 35'	Stadium: Antalya Stadium

24 March Hybrid match	Alanyaspor (Turkey)	2–2	Curaçao	Alanya, Turkey
	Silva 40'; Sisto 76'		Margaritha 30'; Bacuna 53'	Stadium: Alanya Oba Stadium

5 June 2026 FIFA World Cup qualification	Curaçao	4–1	Barbados	Willemstad, Curaçao
19:30 UTC−4	Janga 25', 62', 86' (pen.); Kastaneer 90+2'	Report (FIFA); Report (CONCACAF)	Reid-Stephen 90+2' (pen.)	Stadium: Ergilio Hato Stadium; Attendance: 4,254; Referee: Iván Barton (El Salvador)

8 June 2026 FIFA World Cup qualification	Aruba	0–2	Curaçao	Oranjestad, Aruba
21:00 UTC−4		Report	Bacuna 58'; Severina 90+6'	Stadium: Complejo Deportivo Guillermo Prospero Trinidad; Referee: César Arturo Ramos (Mexico)

6 September 2024–25 Nations League	Saint Lucia	2–1	Curaçao	St. George's, Grenada
17:00 UTC−6	Arkell Jude-Boyd 24'; Caniggia Elva 55'	Report	Joshua Brenet 63'	Stadium: Kirani James Athletic Stadium; Referee: Ken Pennyfeather (Antigua and Barbuda)

9 September 2024–25 Nations League	Curaçao	4–0	Saint Martin	St. George's, Grenada
17:00 UTC−6	Juninho Bacuna 10'; Gervane Kastaneer 13'; Leandro Bacuna 48'; Joshua Zimmerman 65'	Report		Stadium: Kirani James Athletic Stadium; Referee: Jose Corporan (Dominican Republic)

11 October 2024–25 Nations League	Grenada	0–0	Curaçao	Gros Islet, Saint Lucia
17:00 UTC−6				Stadium: Daren Sammy Cricket Ground; Referee: Jon Freemon (United States)

14 October 2024–25 Nations League	Curaçao	1–0	Grenada	Gros Islet, Saint Lucia
16:00 UTC−6	Juninho Bacuna 30'			Stadium: Daren Sammy Cricket Ground; Referee: Christopher Mason (Jamaica)

15 November 2024–25 Nations League	Saint Martin	0–5	Curaçao	Willemstad, Curacao
16:30 UTC−6			Margaritha 24', 34', 54', 80'; Juninho Bacuna 78' (pen.)	Stadium: Ergilio Hato Stadium; Referee: Félix Mojica (Nicaragua)

18 November 2024–25 Nations League	Curaçao	4–1	Saint Lucia	Willemstad, Curacao
18:00 UTC−6	Kastaneer 27', 30'; Bacuna 73', 79'		Charles 28'	Stadium: Ergilio Hato Stadium; Referee: Fernando Hernández Gómez (Mexico)

=== 2025 ===
19 March Friendly	Curaçao	0–2	Kazakhstan	Antalya, Turkey
12:30 AST			Maksim Samorodov 15'; Askhat Tagybergen 36'

22 March Friendly	Antalyaspor (Turkey)	Cancelled	Curaçao	Antalya, Turkey

6 June 2026 FIFA World Cup qualification	Curaçao	4–0	Saint Lucia	Willemstad, Curaçao
19:30 AST	Gervane Kastaneer 37', 52', 57'; Juninho Bacuna 74'	Report		Stadium: Ergilio Hato Stadium; Referee: José Raúl Torres Rivera (Puerto Rico)

10 June 2026 FIFA World Cup qualification	Haiti	1–5	Curaçao	Oranjestad, Aruba
	Louicius Don Deedson 61'		Gervane Kastaneer 12'; Kenji Gorré 15'; Jearl Margaritha 69'; Kevin Felida 89'; Jeremy Antonisse 90+3'	Stadium: Trinidad Stadium; Referee: Steven Madrigal (Costa Rica)

17 June 2025 CONCACAF Gold Cup	Curaçao	0–0	El Salvador	San Jose, United States
17:15 UTC-7		Report		Stadium: PayPal Park; Referee: Katia Itzel García (Mexico)

21 June 2025 CONCACAF Gold Cup	Curaçao	1–1	Canada	Houston, United States
18:00 UTC-5	Jeremy Antonisse 90+4'		Nathan Saliba 9'	Stadium: Shell Energy Stadium

24 June 2025 CONCACAF Gold Cup	Honduras	2–1	Curaçao	San Jose, United States
19:00 UTC-7	Jorge Álvarez 32'; Luis Palma 90+1'		Edrick Menjívar 42'	Stadium: PayPal Park

5 September 2026 FIFA World Cup qualification	Trinidad and Tobago	0–0	Curaçao	Port of Spain, Trinidad and Tobago
20:00 AST				Stadium: Hasely Crawford Stadium; Referee: Katia Itzel García (Mexico)

9 September 2026 FIFA World Cup qualification	Curaçao	3–2	Bermuda	Willemstad, Curaçao
20:00 AST	Tahith Chong 14', 26'; Tyrese Noslin 75'		Kane Crichlow 35'; Djair Parfitt-Williams 42'	Stadium: Ergilio Hato Stadium; Referee: Adonis Carrasco (Dominican Republic)

10 October 2026 FIFA World Cup qualification	Curaçao	2–0	Jamaica	Willemstad, Curaçao
19:00 AST	Livano Comenencia 14'; Kenji Gorre 68'			Stadium: Ergilio Hato Stadium

14 October 2026 FIFA World Cup qualification	Curaçao	1–1	Trinidad and Tobago	Willemstad, Curaçao
19:00 AST	Gorre 19'	Report	Spicer 58'	Stadium: Ergilio Hato Stadium; Attendance: 10,000; Referee: César Arturo Ramos (Mexico)

13 November 2026 FIFA World Cup qualification	Bermuda	0–7	Curaçao	Hamilton, Bermuda
20:00 AST		Report	Leandro Bacuna 6' (pen.); Juninho Bacuna 32'; Jordi Paulina 48' (pen.), 63'; Sontje Hansen 59'; Arjany Martha 82'; Roshon van Eijma 90+3'	Stadium: Bermuda National Stadium; Attendance: 1,181; Referee: Tori Penso (United States)

18 November 2026 FIFA World Cup qualification	Jamaica	0–0	Curaçao	Kingston, Jamaica
20:00 AST		Report		Stadium: Independence Park; Referee: Iván Barton (El Salvador)

=== 2026 ===
27 March 2026 FIFA Series	China	2–0	Curaçao	Sydney, Australia
17:00 UTC+11	Wei Shihao 45+2'; Zhang Yuning 59'	Report		Stadium: Stadium Australia; Attendance: 7,578; Referee: Alex King

31 March 2026 FIFA Series	Australia	5–1	Curaçao	Melbourne, Australia
20:10 AEDT	Mabil 23'; Circati 67'; Bos 71'; Irankunda 80', 84'	Report	Martha 50'	Stadium: AAMI Park; Referee: Andrew Madley (England)

30 May Friendly	Scotland	4–1	Curaçao	Glasgow, Scotland
13:00 BST	Curtis 45'; Shankland 59', 64'; Christie 81' (pen.)	Report	Chong 17'	Stadium: Hampden Park; Attendance: 44,433; Referee: Goga Kikacheishvili (Georgia)

6 June Friendly	Curaçao	4–0	Aruba	Willemstad, Curaçao
19:30 AST	Brenet 53'; Antonisse 68'; Comenencia 83'; Bacuna 90'	Report		Stadium: Ergilio Hato Stadium; Referee: José Corporán (Dominican Republic)

14 June 2026 FIFA World Cup Group E	Germany	7–1	Curaçao	Houston, Texas, United States
12:00 CDT	Nmecha 6'; Schlotterbeck 38'; Havertz 45+5' (pen.), 88'; Musiala 47'; Brown 68'; Undav 78'	Report	Comenencia 21'	Stadium: NRG Stadium; Attendance: 68,021; Referee: Jalal Jayed (Morocco)

20 June 2026 FIFA World Cup Group E	Ecuador	0–0	Curaçao	Kansas City, Missouri, United States
19:00 CDT		Report		Stadium: Arrowhead Stadium; Attendance: 68,598; Referee: Ma Ning (China)

25 June 2026 FIFA World Cup Group E	Curaçao	0–2	Ivory Coast	Philadelphia, Pennsylvania, United States
16:00 EDT		Report	Pépé 7' Pépé 64'	Stadium: Lincoln Financial Field; Attendance: 68,324; Referee: Glenn Nyberg (Sweden)

24 September 2026-27 CONCACAF Nations League A Group Stage	Costa Rica	3–4	Curaçao	San José, Costa Rica
21:00 CST	O. Sinclair 2' C. Mora 23', 46'	Report	K. Gorré 62', 78' T. Chong 66' J. Paulina 82'	Stadium: Estadio Ricardo Saprissa Aymá

27 September 2026-27 CONCACAF Nations League A Group Stage	Curaçao	6–1	Nicaragua	Willemstad, Curaçao
	L. Comenencia 6' K. Gorré 11', 39' L. Bacuna 19' J. Bacuna, 27' J. Locadia 88'	Report	J. Moreno 62'	Stadium: Stadion Ergilio Hato

1 October 2026-27 CONCACAF Nations League A Group Stage	Curaçao	v	Trinidad and Tobago	Curaçao
				Stadium: TBA

4 October 2026-27 CONCACAF Nations League A Group Stage	Trinidad and Tobago	v	Curaçao	Trinidad and Tobago
				Stadium: TBA

== Head to head records ==
Head to head records
Opponent	P	W	D	L	GF	GA	W%	D%	L%
Ajax	1	0	0	1	1	5	0	0	100
Alanyaspor	1	0	1	0	2	2	0	100	0
Argentina	1	0	0	1	0	7	0	0	100
Aruba	4	3	1	0	12	2	75	25	0
Australia	1	0	0	1	1	5	0	0	100
Barbados	1	1	0	0	4	1	100	0	0
British Virgin Islands	1	1	0	0	8	0	100	0	0
Bahrain	1	0	0	1	0	4	0	0	100
Bermuda	2	2	0	0	10	2	100	0	0
Canada	3	0	1	2	1	7	0	33	67
China	1	0	0	1	0	2	0	0	100
Costa Rica	1	1	0	0	4	3	100	0	0
Cuba	1	1	0	0	2	1	100	0	0
Ecuador	1	0	1	0	0	0	0	100	0
El Salvador	1	0	1	0	0	0	0	100	0
Germany	1	0	0	1	1	7	0	0	100
Grenada	2	1	1	0	1	0	50	50	0
Guatemala	1	0	1	0	0	0	0	100	0
Haiti	1	1	0	0	5	1	100	0	0
Honduras	3	1	0	2	4	3	33	0	67
Hull City	1	1	0	0	1	0	100	0	0
Indonesia	2	0	0	2	3	5	0	0	100
Jamaica	2	1	1	0	2	0	50	50	0
Kazakhstan	1	0	0	1	0	2	0	0	100
New Zealand	1	0	0	1	1	2	0	0	100
Nicaragua	1	1	0	0	6	1	100	0	0
Panama	2	0	1	1	1	2	0	50	50
Saint Kitts and Nevis	1	0	1	0	1	1	0	100	0
Saint Lucia	3	2	0	1	9	3	67	0	33
Saint Martin	2	2	0	0	9	0	100	0	0
Saint Vincent and the Grenadines	1	1	0	0	5	0	100	0	0
Scotland	1	0	0	1	1	4	0	0	100
Suriname	1	0	1	0	2	2	0	100	0
Trinidad and Tobago	5	1	4	0	4	3	20	80	0
Total	51	19	15	17	90	72	37%	29%	33%
